= G1 Climax =

New Japan Pro-Wrestling event series

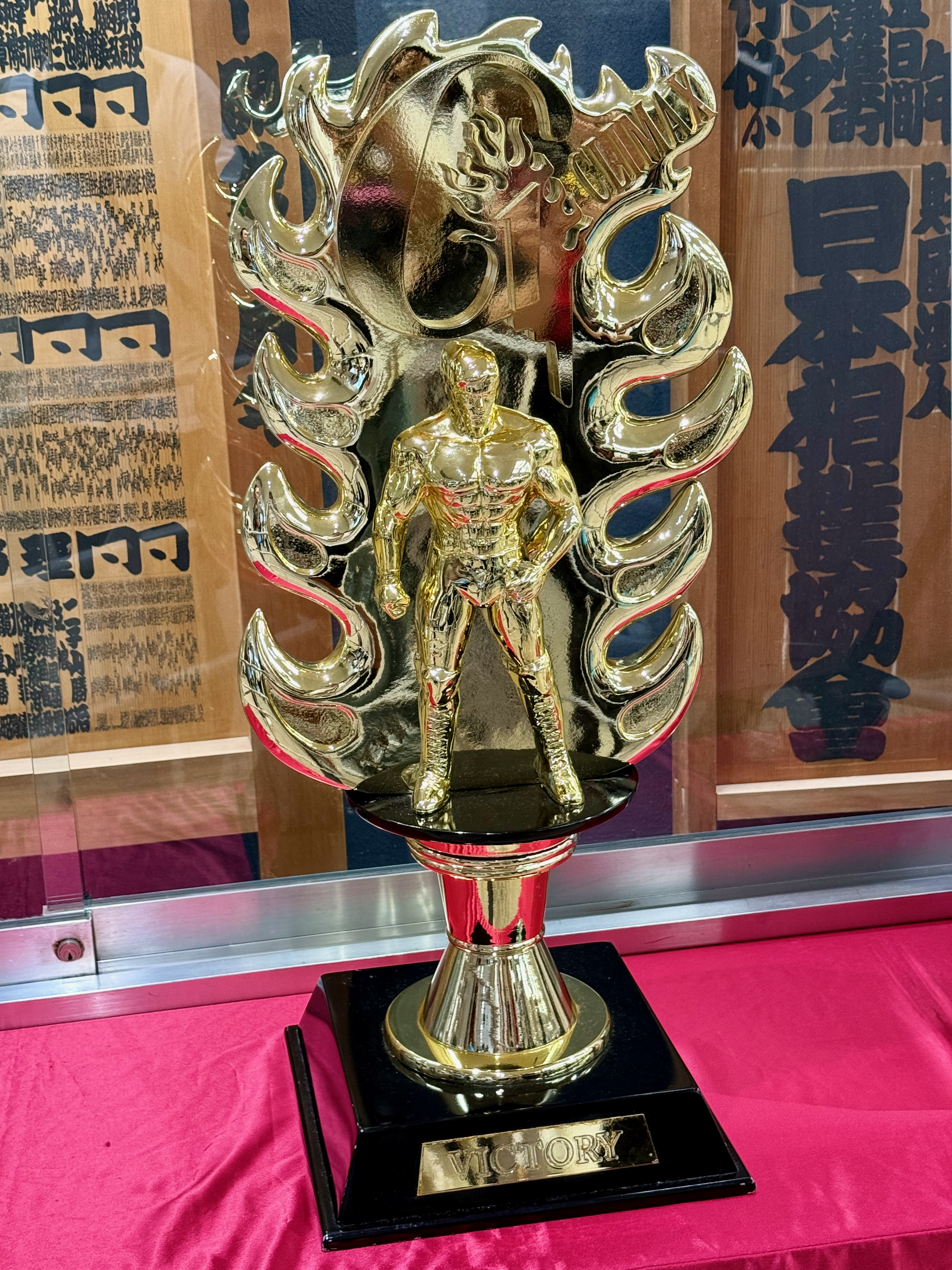
G1 Climax trophy

The G1 (Grade One) Climax (G1（グレードワン）クライマックス, Gurēdo Wan Kuraimakkusu) is a professional wrestling tournament held each August by the New Japan Pro-Wrestling (NJPW) promotion. Though it has sometimes been held as a single-elimination tournament, it is usually – and currently – held as a round-robin, with the most victorious wrestlers in each pool wrestling in a short tournament to decide that year's winner. Traditionally, since 2012, the winner of the tournament earns the right to challenge for the IWGP Heavyweight Championship at the following January's Wrestle Kingdom show, but since 2024, the winner has chosen to receive his IWGP Heavyweight Championship match at King of Pro-Wrestling.

In its current format, the tournament lasts four weeks. The winner of each pool is determined by a points system; two points for a victory, one point for a draw, and zero points for a loss or no contest. Under the current format, double decisions (such as double count-outs or double disqualifications) are treated as draws.

== Tournament history ==
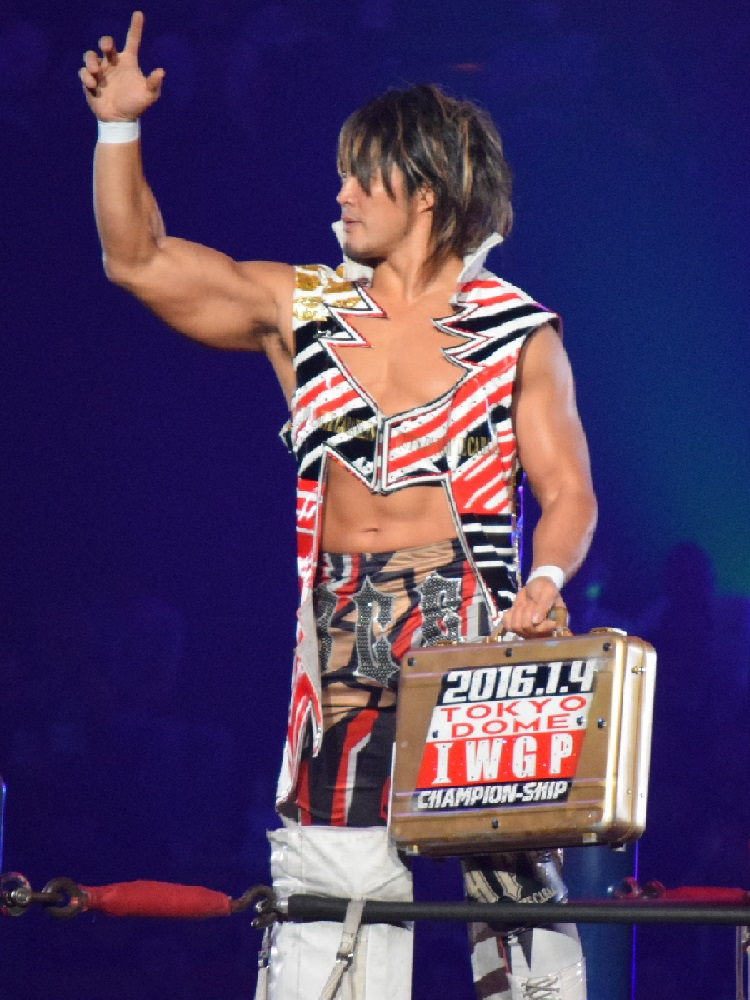
Hiroshi Tanahashi holding his prize for winning the 2015 G1 Climax, a contract for an IWGP Heavyweight Championship match at Wrestle Kingdom 10 in Tokyo Dome

NJPW had an annual tournament since 1974 under various names: the World League (ワールドリーグ戦, Wārudorīgu-sen) (1974–1977, based on the World (Big) League tournament from the old Japanese Wrestling Association held between 1959 and 1972); the MSG League (MSGシリーズ, MSG shirīzu) (1978–1982); the IWGP League (IWGPリーグ戦, IWGP rīgu-sen) (1983–1988), "IWGP" is the acronym of NJPW's governing body, the International Wrestling Grand Prix (インターナショナル・レスリング・グラン・プリ, intānashonaru resuringu guran puri). Most of these tournaments were dominated by NJPW's founding top star Antonio Inoki.

Although the 1983 winner, Hulk Hogan, was awarded a championship belt, this is not the beginning of the IWGP Heavyweight Championship, but its early version that was defended annually against the winner of the IWGP League of the year. The current IWGP Heavyweight Championship arrived only in 1987, replacing the old version.

In 1989, there was a World Cup Tournament (ワールドカップ争奪リーグ戦, Wārudokappu sōdatsu rīgu-sen), which included wrestlers from the then-Soviet Union. No tournament was held in 1990.

With Inoki's dominance over NJPW gone, the promotion established the G1 Climax tournament in 1991 as a platform to showcase the company's top heavyweights and have them compete in round-robin matches where the winners of the two divisions would then square off in the tournament final. NJPW president Seiji Sakaguchi named the tournament after horse racing's top grade of group races (known as graded stakes races in North America), Grade One ("G1"), such as the Japan Cup and the four races in North America that form the Grand Slam of Thoroughbred Racing. Though considered a continuation of the previous tournaments, officially NJPW does not recognize the earlier tournaments as part of the G1 Climax lineage. The first G1 was held from August 7 to August 11, 1991, at Tokyo's Ryōgoku Kokugikan. The winner of the tournament, assuming they are not already the champion, has traditionally earned a shot at the IWGP Heavyweight Championship. Since 2012, the winner has earned the "Tokyo Dome IWGP Heavyweight Championship challenge rights certificate", a contract for a title shot at NJPW's largest event, Wrestle Kingdom in Tokyo Dome, held annually on January 4. Much like WWE's Money in the Bank contract, the certificate is kept in a briefcase that the wrestler then has to defend until the end of the year. Since its inception, the contract has only changed hands one time, on November 7, 2020, at Power Struggle when Jay White defeated Kota Ibushi. In 2021, the now retired IWGP Heavyweight Championship belt was given to G1 winner Kazuchika Okada instead of a briefcase. In 2015, the tournament format was changed with NJPW reducing the number of G1 Climax matches per show, giving the participating wrestlers more time to rest between matches. This increased the tournament's length to four weeks. In 2016, Kenny Omega became the first non-Japanese wrestler to win the tournament.

The G1 Climax tournament has often been used as a platform for NJPW to push their rising stars. Wins by young up-and-comers over Japanese legends would usually take their respective careers to new heights. The first tournament was specifically created to make stars out of Keiji Muto, Masahiro Chono and Shinya Hashimoto, three NJPW wrestlers who had just returned to the promotion from their overseas learning excursions. Past winners include Muto, Chono, Hashimoto, Yuji Nagata, Hiroshi Tanahashi, and others who have gone on to become wrestling superstars.

Unlike the New Japan Cup, the G1 Climax features the then-reigning IWGP Heavyweight Champion as one of the participants, except in 1992, 2001, 2004 and 2008, when then-champions Riki Choshu (in 1992), Kazuyuki Fujita (in 2001 and 2004), and Keiji Muto (in 2008), respectively, did not compete in the tournament. Often being labeled as a favorite to win the tournament, the IWGP Heavyweight Champion has reached the final five times, the first one being in 1995 when Keiji Muto won the tournament. Muto would repeat this feat again in 1999, but would lose the final to Manabu Nakanishi. Other then-reigning champions to reach the final include Kensuke Sasaki in 2000, Kazuyuki Fujita in 2005 and Yuji Nagata in 2007. Muto and Sasaki are the only two wrestlers to have won the G1 Climax while holding the IWGP Heavyweight Championship. As of 2026, every G1 Climax winner has held either the IWGP Heavyweight Championship or IWGP World Heavyweight Championship, with Konosuke Takeshita being the last to accomplish this by defeating Zack Sabre Jr. for the IWGP World Heavyweight Championship at King of Pro-Wrestling on October 13, 2025. Overall, Antonio Inoki holds the record for most tournament wins with ten, while Masahiro Chono with his five wins holds the record for most tournament wins under its G1 Climax name. Hiroyoshi Tenzan has taken part in the G1 Climax tournament a record 21 times.

The opening night of the 2019 G1 Climax took place in Dallas, Texas, marking the first time the opening night took place outside Japan.

The finals for the 2020 G1 Climax took place in October due to the Summer Olympics originally intended to be held in Tokyo when the tournament is usually held, making this the first time the tournament took place in the Autumn.

The longest match in tournament history is Kota Ibushi vs. Sanada in the 2020 finals at 35 minutes and 12 seconds. The longest match with a decisive winner in the block stages of the tournament is Sanada vs. Kazuchika Okada in the 2019 tournament at 29 minutes and 47 seconds, 13 seconds shy of the 30-minute time limit. Conversely, the shortest match is Hirooki Goto vs. Toru Yano in the 2020 tournament at just 18 seconds.

== List of winners ==
Tournament	Year	Winner	Total won	Refs.
World League	1974	Antonio Inoki	1	
World League	1975	Antonio Inoki	2	
World League	1976	Seiji Sakaguchi	1	
World League	1977	Seiji Sakaguchi	2	
MSG League	1978	Antonio Inoki	3	
MSG League	1979	Antonio Inoki	4	
MSG League	1980	Antonio Inoki	5	
MSG League	1981	Antonio Inoki	6	
MSG League	1982	André the Giant	1	
IWGP League	1983	Hulk Hogan	1	
IWGP League	1984	Antonio Inoki	7	
IWGP League	1985	André the Giant	2	
IWGP League	1986	Antonio Inoki	8	
IWGP League	1987	Antonio Inoki	9	
IWGP League	1988	Antonio Inoki	10	
World Cup Tournament	1989	Riki Choshu	1	
-	1990	-	-	
G1 Climax	1991	Masahiro Chono	1	
G1 Climax	1992	Masahiro Chono	2	
G1 Climax	1993	Tatsumi Fujinami	1	
G1 Climax	1994	Masahiro Chono	3	
G1 Climax	1995	Keiji Muto	1	
G1 Climax	1996	Riki Choshu	2	
G1 Climax	1997	Kensuke Sasaki	1	
G1 Climax	1998	Shinya Hashimoto	1	
G1 Climax	1999	Manabu Nakanishi	1	
G1 Climax	2000	Kensuke Sasaki	2	
G1 Climax	2001	Yuji Nagata	1	
G1 Climax	2002	Masahiro Chono	4	
G1 Climax	2003	Hiroyoshi Tenzan	1	
G1 Climax	2004	Hiroyoshi Tenzan	2	
G1 Climax	2005	Masahiro Chono	5	
G1 Climax	2006	Hiroyoshi Tenzan	3	
G1 Climax	2007	Hiroshi Tanahashi	1	
G1 Climax	2008	Hirooki Goto	1	
G1 Climax	2009	Togi Makabe	1	
G1 Climax	2010	Satoshi Kojima	1	
G1 Climax	2011	Shinsuke Nakamura	1	
G1 Climax	2012	Kazuchika Okada	1	
G1 Climax	2013	Tetsuya Naito	1	
G1 Climax	2014	Kazuchika Okada	2	
G1 Climax	2015	Hiroshi Tanahashi	2	
G1 Climax	2016	Kenny Omega	1	
G1 Climax	2017	Tetsuya Naito	2	
G1 Climax	2018	Hiroshi Tanahashi	3	
G1 Climax	2019	Kota Ibushi	1	
G1 Climax	2020	Kota Ibushi	2	
G1 Climax	2021	Kazuchika Okada	3	
G1 Climax	2022	Kazuchika Okada	4	
G1 Climax	2023	Tetsuya Naito	3	
G1 Climax	2024	Zack Sabre Jr.	1	
G1 Climax	2025	Konosuke Takeshita	1	
G1 Climax	2026	Ryohei Oiwa	1	

== IWGP Heavyweight Championship challenge rights certificate ==
The tradition of G1 Climax winners getting an IWGP Heavyweight Championship title shot has been in place since the beginning of the tournament, with exceptions in 1992 (when Masahiro Chono was awarded the NWA World Heavyweight Championship as prize for winning the tournament), 1993 and 2001 (when Yuji Nagata challenged for the GHC Heavyweight title due to the IWGP being vacant at the time) as well as 1995 and 2000, when the champion won the tournament. This tradition can be traced back to the days of the IWGP League, with the championship itself being awarded the title per stipulation from 1983 to 1986 and the 1987 tournament being used to crown the first proper, full-time IWGP Heavyweight champion. 1988 would be the first time a title shot was awarded to the winner.

After winning the 2012 G1 Climax, Kazuchika Okada made a shocking statement to challenge Hiroshi Tanahashi at Wrestle Kingdom 7. This would start a tradition that lasted every year until 2024, when Zack Sabre Jr choose to face Tetsuya Naito at King or Pro-Wrestling, and would be repeated in 2025 with Konosuke Takeshita challenging Sabre Jr at the same event.

Year	Certificate history
1991	Holder: Masahiro Chono Lost to Tatsumi Fujinami for the IWGP Heavyweight Championship on November 5, 1991 at Tokyo 3Days Battle
1992	Holder: Masahiro Chono Won the vacant NWA World Heavyweight Championship with winning the tournament on August 12, 1992
1993	Holder: Tatsumi Fujinami Choose not to pursue
1994	Holder: Masahiro Chono Lost to Shinya Hashimoto for the IWGP Heavyweight Championship on September 27, 1994 at G1 Climax Special
1995	Holder: Keiji Muto Was the IWGP Heavyweight Champion when winning the tournament on August 15, 1995 Defended against Junji Hirata in G1 Climax Special tour on September 25, 1995 at G1 Climax Special And defended against Nobuhiko Takada in New Japan Pro Wrestling vs UWF International on October 9, 1995
1996	Holder: Riki Choshu Lost to Shinya Hashimoto for the IWGP Heavyweight Championship on January 4, 1997 at Wrestling World
1997	Holder: Kensuke Sasaki Defeated Shinya Hashimoto for the IWGP Heavyweight Championship on August 31, 1997 at Final Power Hall In Yokohama
1998	Holder: Shinya Hashimoto Lost to Scott Norton for the IWGP Heavyweight Championship on October 30, 1998 at nWo Typhoon
1999	Holder: Manabu Nakanishi Lost to Keiji Muto for the IWGP Heavyweight Championship on October 11, 1999 at Final Dome
2000	Holder: Kensuke Sasaki Was the IWGP Heavyweight Champion when winning the tournament on August 13, 2000 Lost to Toshiaki Kawada in a non-title match on October 9, 2000 at Do Judge!! decided to vacate the title in humiliation
2001	Holder: Yuji Nagata Lost to Jun Akiyama for the GHC Heavyweight Championship on January 4, 2002 at Wrestling World Making Nagata the only person to not challenge for the IWGP Heavyweight Championship as the winner Originally was supposed to face Kazuyuki Fujita for the IWGP Heavyweight Championship, but Fujita vacated the title due to injury
2002	Holder: Masahiro Chono Fought Yuji Nagata for the IWGP Heavyweight Championship to a time limit draw on October 26, 2002 at Toukon Series
2003	Holder: Hiroyoshi Tenzan Defeated Yoshihiro Takayama for the IWGP Heavyweight Championship on November 3, 2003 at Yokohama Dead Out
2004	Holder: Hiroyoshi Tenzan Defeated Kensuke Sasaki for the IWGP Heavyweight Championship on December 12, 2004 at Final Battle
2005	Holder: Masahiro Chono Lost to Brock Lesnar for the IWGP Heavyweight Championship alongside Kazuyuki Fujita in a Three Way Match on October 8, 2005 at Toukon Souzou New Chapter
2006	Holder: Hiroyoshi Tenzan Lost to Hiroshi Tanahashi for the IWGP Heavyweight Championship on October 9, 2006 at Explosion
2007	Holder: Hiroshi Tanahashi Defeated Yuji Nagata for the IWGP Heavyweight Championship on October 8, 2007 at Explosion
2008	Holder: Hirooki Goto Lost to Keiji Muto for the IWGP Heavyweight Championship on August 31, 2008 at AJPW Pro-Wrestling Love in Ryogoku Vol. 5 Making Goto the only person to challenge for the title outside of the NJPW ring
2009	Holder: Togi Makabe Lost to Shinsuke Nakamura for the vacated IWGP Heavyweight Championship on September 27, 2009 at Circuit New Japan Generation After previous champion Hiroshi Tanahashi had to vacate the title due to an injury at the eye socket he received during the G1 Climax tournament match against Nakamura
2010	Holder: Satoshi Kojima Defeated Togi Makabe for the IWGP Heavyweight Championship on October 11, 2010 at Destruction
2011	Holder: Shinsuke Nakamura Lost to Hiroshi Tanahashi for the IWGP Heavyweight Championship on September 19, 2011 at G1 Climax Special
2012	Holder: Kazuchika Okada Successfully defended the certificate against Karl Anderson on October 8, 2012 at King of Pro-Wrestling Successfully defended the certificate against Hirooki Goto on November 11, 2012 at Power Struggle Lost to Hiroshi Tanahashi for the IWGP Heavyweight Championship on January 4, 2013 at Wrestle Kingdom 7 in Tokyo Dome
2013	Holder: Tetsuya Naito Successfully defended the certificate against Masato Tanaka on September 29, 2013 at Destruction Successfully defended the certificate against Yujiro Takahashi on October 14, 2013 at King of Pro-Wrestling Successfully defended the certificate against Masato Tanaka on November 9, 2013, at Power Struggle Lost to Kazuchika Okada for the IWGP Heavyweight Championship on January 4, 2014 at Wrestle Kingdom 8 in Tokyo Dome
2014	Holder: Kazuchika Okada Successfully defended the certificate against Karl Anderson on September 23, 2014 at Destruction in Okayama Successfully defended the certificate against Tetsuya Naito on October 13, 2014 at King of Pro-Wrestling Lost to Hiroshi Tanahashi for the IWGP Heavyweight Championship on January 4, 2015 at Wrestle Kingdom 9 in Tokyo Dome
2015	Holder: Hiroshi Tanahashi Successfully defended the certificate against Bad Luck Fale on September 27, 2015 at Destruction in Kobe Successfully defended the certificate against Tetsuya Naito on October 12, 2015 at King of Pro-Wrestling Lost to Kazuchika Okada for the IWGP Heavyweight Championship on January 4, 2016 at Wrestle Kingdom 10 in Tokyo Dome
2016	Holder: Kenny Omega Successfully defended the certificate against Yoshi-Hashi on September 22, 2016 at Destruction in Hiroshima Successfully defended the certificate against Hirooki Goto on October 10, 2016 at King of Pro-Wrestling Lost to Kazuchika Okada for the IWGP Heavyweight Championship on January 4, 2017 at Wrestle Kingdom 11 in Tokyo Dome
2017	Holder: Tetsuya Naito Successfully defended the certificate against Tomohiro Ishii on October 9, 2017 at King of Pro-Wrestling Lost to Kazuchika Okada for the IWGP Heavyweight Championship on January 4, 2018 at Wrestle Kingdom 12 in Tokyo Dome
2018	Holder: Hiroshi Tanahashi Successfully defended the certificate against Kazuchika Okada on September 23, 2018 at Destruction in Kobe Successfully defended the certificate against Jay White on October 8, 2018 at King of Pro-Wrestling Defeated Kenny Omega for the IWGP Heavyweight Championship on January 4, 2019 at Wrestle Kingdom 13 in Tokyo Dome
2019	Holder: Kota Ibushi Successfully defended the certificate against Kenta on September 16, 2019 at Destruction in Kagoshima Successfully defended the certificate against Evil on October 14, 2019 at King of Pro-Wrestling Lost to Kazuchika Okada for the IWGP Heavyweight Championship on January 4, 2020 at Wrestle Kingdom 14 in Tokyo Dome
2020	Holder: Kota Ibushi Lost the certificate against Jay White on November 7, 2020 at Power Struggle
2020	Holder: Jay White Lost to Kota Ibushi for the IWGP Heavyweight Championship and IWGP Intercontinental Championship on January 5, 2021 at Wrestle Kingdom 15 in Tokyo Dome
2021	Holder: Kazuchika Okada Successfully defended the certificate against Tama Tonga on November 6, 2021 at Power Struggle Defeated Shingo Takagi for the IWGP World Heavyweight Championship on January 4, 2022 at Wrestle Kingdom 16
2022	Holder: Kazuchika Okada Defeated Jay White for the IWGP World Heavyweight Championship on January 4, 2023 at Wrestle Kingdom 17
2023	Holder: Tetsuya Naito Successfully defended the certificate against Jeff Cobb on September 24, 2023 at Destruction in Kobe Defeated Sanada for the IWGP World Heavyweight Championship on January 4, 2024 at Wrestle Kingdom 18
2024	Holder: Zack Sabre Jr. Defeated Tetsuya Naito for the IWGP World Heavyweight Championship on October 14, 2024 at King of Pro-Wrestling
2025	Holder: Konosuke Takeshita Defeated Zack Sabre Jr. for the IWGP World Heavyweight Championship on October 13, 2025 at King of Pro-Wrestling
2026	Holder: Ryohei Oiwa Lost to Yota Tsuji for the IWGP World Heavyweight Championship on October 12, 2026 at King of Pro-Wrestling

== World League ==
=== 1974 ===
The 1974 World League ran from April 5 to May 8, 1974. The tournament began with 16 wrestlers, eight Japanese and eight Internationals, placed into groups accordingly. All first round matches featured the Japanese against the Internationals. The top four finishers from both groups advanced to a second round of round-robin competition.

Round one
Japanese		International	
Seiji Sakaguchi	7.5	Killer Karl Krupp	7
Antonio Inoki	7	Invader I	6
Masa Saito	5.5	Stan Stasiak	5
Kantaro Hoshino	4	Geto Mongol	3.5
Kotetsu Yamamoto	3.5	Khosrow Vaziri	3
Haruka Eigen	2	Bolo Mongol	3
Osamu Kido	2	Walter Johnson	1
Katsuhisa Shibata	1	Argentina Zuma	0

Round two
Antonio Inoki	5.5
Seiji Sakaguchi	5.5
Killer Karl Krupp	5.5
Masa Saito	5
Stan Stasiak	2.5
Invader I	2
Kantaro Hoshino	1.5
Geto Mongol	0

Tie-breaker
Antonio Inoki (J)	2-0
Seiji Sakaguchi (J)	1-1
Killer Karl Krupp (I)	0-2

	Inoki (J)	Krupp (I)	Sakaguchi (J)
Inoki (J)	—N/a	Inoki (7:17)	Inoki (16:52)
Krupp (I)	Inoki (7:17)	—N/a	Sakaguchi (12:46)
Sakaguchi (J)	Inoki (16:52)	Sakaguchi (12:46)	—N/a

=== 1975 ===
The 1975 World League ran from April 4 to May 16, 1975. The tournament featured 16 wrestlers, but the Locals versus Internationals format was abolished. The top five finishers advanced to a knockout round, with the top finisher receiving a bye to the final.

Final standings
Killer Karl Krupp	13.5
Antonio Inoki	12.5
Seiji Sakaguchi	12.5
Kintarō Ōki	12.5
Strong Kobayashi	12.5
Super Destroyer	10.5
Masa Saito	9
Kotetsu Yamamoto	8
Kantaro Hoshino	7
Man Mountain Mike	7
Haruka Eigen	5
Katsuhisa Shibata	3
John Gagne	2
Sangre Fría	2
Father Singh	2
Osamu Kido	1

Quarterfinals
2	Antonio Inoki	Sub
5	Strong Kobayashi	20:02
3	Seiji Sakaguchi	DDQ
4	Kintarō Ōki	2:23

Semifinals
2	Antonio Inoki	Defaulted
Won by default	DDQ

Final
1	Killer Karl Krupp	Sub
2	Antonio Inoki	16:42

=== 1976 ===
The 1976 World League ran from April 2 to May 11, 1976. The tournament featured 14 wrestlers. The top finisher advanced to the final match of the tournament, to face the winner of a three-wrestler round-robin semifinal round.

First round
Pedro Morales	13
Killer Karl Krupp	10
Víctor Rivera	10
Seiji Sakaguchi	10
Strong Kobayashi	9
Masa Saito	9
Kantaro Hoshino	7
Osamu Kido	6
Towering Inferno	5
Butcher Vachon	4
Haruka Eigen	3
Ken Mantell	3
Raul Mata	2
Kotetsu Yamamoto	0

Semifinals
Seiji Sakaguchi	2-0
Killer Karl Krupp	1-1
Víctor Rivera	0-2

	Krupp	Rivera	Sakaguchi
Krupp	—N/a	Krupp (12:06)	Sakaguchi (6:12)
Víctor Rivera	Krupp (12:06)	—N/a	Sakaguchi (8:57)
Seiji Sakaguchi	Sakaguchi (6:12)	Sakaguchi (8:57)	—N/a

Final
1	Pedro Morales	CO
2	Seiji Sakaguchi	25:38

=== 1977 ===
The 1977 World League ran from April 21 to May 30, 1977. The tournament featured 11 wrestlers.

Final standings
The Masked Superstar	10
Seiji Sakaguchi	8
Mitsuo Yoshida	7.5
Nikolai Volkoff	7.5
Kantaro Hoshino	5
Johnny Powers	4
Manuel Soto	4
Haruka Eigen	3
Osamu Kido	3
Tony Charles	2
Enrique Vera	1

Final
1	The Masked Superstar	Sub
2	Seiji Sakaguchi	20:05

== MSG Series ==
=== 1978 ===
The 1978 MSG Series ran from April 21 to May 30, 1978. The tournament featured nine wrestlers in a round robin format, with a different scoring system than today's tournaments. A win by pinfall or submission was worth five points, a win by dq or countout was worth four points, a time limit, double dq, or double countout draw was worth two points, and a loss or forfeit was worth 0 points. André the Giant received an extra five points, although the reason why is unclear.

Final standings
André the Giant	37
Antonio Inoki	29
Seiji Sakaguchi	28
Tatsumi Fujinami	25
Bugsy McGraw	15
Nikolai Volkoff	14
Umanosuke Ueda	10
Riki Choshu	9
Chief Jay Strongbow	0

Final
1	André the Giant	CO
2	Antonio Inoki	16:41

=== 1979 ===
The 1979 MSG Series ran from April 27 to June 7, 1979. The tournament featured 10 wrestlers.

Final standings
Antonio Inoki	41
Stan Hansen	37
André the Giant	36
Seiji Sakaguchi	31
Tatsumi Fujinami	22
Riki Choshu	18
Canek	16
Masa Saito	10
Larry Zbyszko	5
Tony Garea	0

Final
1	Antonio Inoki	Pin
2	Stan Hansen	9:03

=== 1980 ===
The 1980 MSG Series ran from April 25 to June 5, 1980. The tournament featured 10 wrestlers.

Final standings
Antonio Inoki	35
Stan Hansen	32
André the Giant	32
Seiji Sakaguchi	32
Dusty Rhodes	29
Tatsumi Fujinami	20
Strong Kobayashi	12
Riki Choshu	11
Chavo Guerrero	7
Ryuma Go	0

Final
1	Antonio Inoki	DQ
2	Stan Hansen	7:49

=== 1981 ===
The 1981 MSG Series ran from May 8 to June 4, 1981. The tournament featured 11 wrestlers.

Final standings
Stan Hansen	39
Antonio Inoki	38
Tiger Jeet Singh	38
Hulk Hogan	36
Seiji Sakaguchi	33
Tatsumi Fujinami	29
Riki Choshu	16
Bobby Duncum	14
Sgt. Slaughter	12
Chris Adams	5
Mike Masters	0

Final
1	Stan Hansen	CO
2	Antonio Inoki	7:45

=== 1982 ===
The 1982 MSG Series ran from March 4 to April 1, 1982. The tournament featured 14 wrestlers.

Final standings
André the Giant	57
Antonio Inoki †	53
Killer Khan	50
Dick Murdoch	42
The Masked Superstar	36
Tatsumi Fujinami	35
Rusher Kimura	33
Seiji Sakaguchi	33
Tony Atlas	31
Tiger Toguchi	17
Yoshiaki Yatsu	13
Don Muraco	9
The Iron Sheik	5
Riki Choshu	4

† Antonio Inoki was injured and unable to compete in the final. Killer Khan, as the next highest finisher, took his place.

Final
1	André the Giant	Pin
3	Killer Khan	16:42

== IWGP League ==
=== 1983 ===
The 1983 International Wrestling Grand Prix Championship League ran from May 6 to June 2, 1983. The tournament featured 10 wrestlers. The winner was awarded a championship belt (the original IWGP Heavyweight Championship) defended annually against the winner of the IWGP League of the year.

Final standings
Hulk Hogan	37
Antonio Inoki	36
André the Giant	35
Big John Studd	25
Killer Khan	24
Rusher Kimura	21
Akira Maeda	14
Canek	5
Otto Wanz	5
Enrique Vera	4

	André	Canek	Hogan	Inoki	Khan	Kimura	Maeda	Studd	Vera	Wanz
André	—N/a	André	DCO	André	DCO	André	André	André	André	André
Canek	André	—N/a	Hogan	Inoki	Khan	Kimura	Maeda	Studd	Canek	Wanz
Hogan	DCO	Hogan	—N/a	DCO	Hogan	Hogan	Hogan	Hogan	Hogan	Hogan
Inoki	André	Inoki	DCO	—N/a	Inoki	Inoki	Inoki	Inoki	Inoki	Inoki
Khan	DCO	Khan	Hogan	Inoki	—N/a	Khan	DCO	Studd	Khan	Khan
Kimura	André	Kimura	Hogan	Inoki	Khan	—N/a	Kimura	DCO	Kimura	Kimura
Maeda	André	Maeda	Hogan	Inoki	DCO	Kimura	—N/a	Studd	Maeda	Maeda
Studd	André	Studd	Hogan	Inoki	Studd	DCO	Studd	—N/a	Studd	Studd
Vera	André	Canek	Hogan	Inoki	Khan	Kimura	Maeda	Studd	—N/a	Vera
Wanz	André	Wanz	Hogan	Inoki	Khan	Kimura	Maeda	Studd	Vera	—N/a

Final
1	Hulk Hogan	KO
2	Antonio Inoki	21:27

=== 1984 ===
The 1984 International Wrestling Grand Prix Champion League ran from May 11 to June 14, 1984. The tournament featured 12 wrestlers, and was the first time that the tournament featured no sort of final round. As the winner, Antonio Inoki challenged Hulk Hogan on the final day of the tournament to win the original IWGP Heavyweight Championship.

Final standings
Antonio Inoki	53
André the Giant	49
Tatsumi Fujinami	34
Riki Choshu	32
Dick Murdoch	30
Masa Saito	26
Adrian Adonis	25
The Masked Superstar	18
Ken Patera	17
John Quinn	10
Otto Wanz	6
Big John Studd	2

=== 1985 ===
The IWGP Champion Series ran from May 10 to June 15, 1985. The tournament featured 13 wrestlers, and was single-elimination. This was the first time the tournament did not feature a points system. Andre the Giant won the final on June 7, and lost his ensuing title match against Antonio Inoki on June 11. Inoki also defended & retained against former champion Hulk Hogan 2 days afterwards on June 13.

First round
5	Ron Miller
12	Strong Machine
4	André the Giant
13	Canek
6	Tatsumi Fujinami
11	Mike Sharpe
3	Adrian Adonis
14	King Kong Bundy
7	The Masked Superstar
10	Seiji Sakaguchi
2	Kengo Kimura
15	Dick Murdoch

Quarterfinals
Strong Machine
André the Giant
Tatsumi Fujinami
Adrian Adonis
Seiji Sakaguchi
Dick Murdoch

Semifinals
Seiji Sakaguchi
André the Giant
Tatsumi Fujinami
Dick Murdoch

Final
Tatsumi Fujinami
André the Giant

=== 1986 ===
The 1986 International Wrestling Grand Prix ran from May 16 to June 19, 1986. The tournament featured the return of the points system, with 14 wrestlers in two blocks of seven each. The top two from each block advanced to a knockout stage. The winner won the vacated IWGP Heavyweight Championship (original version).

Final standings
Block A		Block B	
Antonio Inoki	25	Akira Maeda	27
André the Giant	17	Dick Murdoch	21
Seiji Sakaguchi	15	Tatsumi Fujinami	17
Kengo Kimura	15	Jimmy Snuka	16
The Masked Superstar	14	Umanosuke Ueda	13
Yoshiaki Fujiwara	11	The Wild Samoan	9
Klaus Wallace	0	The Cuban Assassin	0

Semifinals
A1	Antonio Inoki	Sub
A2	André the Giant	9:30
B1	Akira Maeda	CO
B2	Dick Murdoch	16:22

Final
A1	Antonio Inoki	Pin
B2	Dick Murdoch	30:07

=== 1987 ===
The 1987 International Wrestling Grand Prix ran from May 11 to June 12, 1987. The tournament featured 14 wrestlers in two blocks of seven each. The top finishers from each block advanced to the final, with the winner becoming the first IWGP Heavyweight Champion. Tatsumi Fujinami missed the tournament due to an injury he suffered on the IWGP Champion Series tour, but acted as a commentator for the final match.

Final standings
Block A		Block B	
Antonio Inoki	29	Masa Saito	28
Yoshiaki Fujiwara	19	Kengo Kimura	21
Konga the Barbarian	18	Hacksaw Higgins	16
Scott Hall	13	George Takano	13
Seiji Sakaguchi	11	Akira Maeda	10
Killer Tim Brooks	4	Umanosuke Ueda	4
Tatsumi Fujinami	0	Alexis Smirnoff	4

Final
A1	Antonio Inoki	Pin
B1	Masa Saito	14:53

=== 1988 ===
The 1988 International Wrestling Grand Prix ran from July 15 to July 29, 1988. The tournament featured five wrestlers in a single block, with the winner becoming the number one contender to IWGP Heavyweight Champion Tatsumi Fujinami for August 8. Antonio Inoki achieved his final League victory, and went to a 60-minute time limit draw with Fujinami on August 8.

Final standings
Antonio Inoki	6
Riki Choshu	6
Big Van Vader	4
Masa Saito	4
Kengo Kimura	0

== World Cup Tournament ==
=== 1989 ===
The 1989 World Cup Tournament was held from November 24 to December 7, 1989. The tournament featured 20 wrestlers in four blocks of five each. Winner Riki Choshu did not receive a title shot until 8 months later on August 19, where he nonetheless defeated Big Van Vader for the championship.

Final standings
Block A		Block B		Block C		Block D	
Riki Choshu	8	Masahiro Chono	8	Salman Hashimikov	8	Steve Williams	8
Victor Zangiev	6	Shinya Hashimoto	6	Brad Rheingans	6	Osamu Kido	6
Kengo Kimura	4	Manny Fernandez	4	Hiroshi Hase	0	Shiro Koshinaka	2
Wayne Bloom	2	Timur Zalasov	2	George Takano	4	Super Strong Machine	2
Buzz Sawyer	0	Andrei Sulsaev	0	Tatsutoshi Goto	2	Vladimir Berkovich	2

Quarterfinals
Shinya Hashimoto
Salman Hashimikov
Steve Williams
Victor Zangiev
Riki Choshu
Osamu Kido
Masahiro Chono
Brad Rheingans

Semifinals
Shinya Hashimoto
Steve Williams
Riki Choshu
Masahiro Chono

Final
Shinya Hashimoto
Riki Choshu

==== 1990 ====
1990 was the only year where a large-scale heavyweight tournament did not take place in NJPW, for unclear reasons. (Note: Antonio Inoki had entered a state of semi-retirement the previous year due to his political aspirations, and could no longer be depended upon as a reliable star-attraction (and tournament winner). Thus, some hypothesize that the lack of a League this year was a conscious decision to briefly disassociate the concept from NJPW and allow for a truly competitive youth-focused rebrand in 1991 (i.e. the G1 Climax). The Kyushu Cup's focus on young top prospects reinforces this supposition.) However, June 12, 1990 did host the one-night 4-man Kyushu Cup, which so-happened to feature the four men who would become the most decorated main event talents of the ensuing decade.

Semifinals
Shinya Hashimoto
Kensuke Sasaki
Keiji Mutoh
Masahiro Chono

Final
Shinya Hashimoto
Keiji Mutoh

== G1 Climax ==
=== 1991 ===
The inaugural G1 Climax was a round-robin tournament consisting of two four-man blocks, and running from August 7 to August 11, 1991. Masahiro Chono won his first of 5 G1 Climax tournaments. Chono had been champion Tatsumi Fujinami's last challenger before the G1, and failed once again to capture the title on November 5.

Final standings
Block A		Block B	
Keiji Muto	4	Masahiro Chono	5
Tatsumi Fujinami	3	Shinya Hashimoto	5
Scott Norton	3	Crusher Bam Bam Bigelow	2
Big Van Vader	2	Riki Choshu	0

Block A	Fujinami	Muto	Norton	Vader
Fujinami	—N/a	Muto (13:56)	Draw (7:56)	Fujinami (12:13)
Muto	Muto (13:56)	—N/a	Norton (9:56)	Muto (13:54)
Norton	Draw (7:56)	Norton (9:56)	—N/a	Vader (10:49)
Vader	Fujinami (12:13)	Muto (13:54)	Vader (10:49)	—N/a
Block B	Bigelow	Chono	Choshu	Hashimoto
Bigelow	—N/a	Chono (12:38)	Bigelow (10:10)	Hashimoto (9:59)
Chono	Chono (12:38)	—N/a	Chono (14:17)	Draw (30:00)
Choshu	Bigelow (10:10)	Chono (14:17)	—N/a	Hashimoto (7:50)
Hashimoto	Hashimoto (9:59)	Draw (30:00)	Hashimoto (7:50)	—N/a

Block B Decision			Final
			A1	Keiji Muto	Pin
B1	Masahiro Chono	Sub	B1	Masahiro Chono	29:31
B2	Shinya Hashimoto	15:50

=== 1992 ===
The 1992 G1 Climax was a 16-man single-elimination tournament, and was also for the vacant NWA World Heavyweight Championship. It ran from August 6 to August 12, 1992. Terry Taylor advanced to the quarterfinals, due to a shoulder injury suffered by his scheduled opponent Hiroshi Hase on August 3.

Round 1 August 6, 7
Arn Anderson	8:58
Steve Austin	Pin
Keiji Muto	Pin
Barry Windham	10:17
Masahiro Chono	Sub
Tony Halme	12:20
Scott Norton	Pin
Crusher Bam Bam Bigelow	8:16
Kensuke Sasaki	Pin
Jim Neidhart	8:20
Hiroshi Hase
Terry Taylor	Forfeit
Shinya Hashimoto	Pin
The Barbarian	11:29
Super Strong Machine	11:54
Rick Rude	Pin

Quarterfinals; August 10
Steve Austin	13:52
Keiji Muto	Pin
Masahiro Chono	Sub
Scott Norton	10:48
Kensuke Sasaki	Pin
Terry Taylor	9:35
Shinya Hashimoto	13:52
Rick Rude	Pin

Semifinals; August 11
Keiji Muto	26:07
Masahiro Chono	Sub
Kensuke Sasaki	19:24
Rick Rude	Pin

Final; August 12
Masahiro Chono	Pin
Rick Rude	29:44

=== 1993 ===
The 1993 G1 Climax was once again a 16-man single-elimination tournament, held from August 3 to August 7, 1993. NJPW invited several non-NJPW wrestlers to participate in the 1993 tournament, including Hiromichi Fuyuki, Ashura Hara, Takashi Ishikawa and The Great Kabuki from WAR, and Yoshiaki Fujiwara from Pro Wrestling Fujiwara Gumi.

Round 1 August 3, 4
Hiroshi Hase	Pin
Shinya Hashimoto	20:42
Michiyoshi Ohara	Pin
Kengo Kimura	26:44
Takayuki Iizuka	Pin
Hiromichi Fuyuki	12:10
Ashura Hara	Sub
Masahiro Chono	12:28
Tatsumi Fujinami	Pin
Yoshiaki Fujiwara	14:32
Osamu Kido	Pin
Takashi Ishikawa	11:33
Shiro Koshinaka	Pin
Super Strong Machine	17:33
Keiji Muto	Pin
The Great Kabuki	16:17

Quarterfinals; August 5
Hiroshi Hase	Pin
Kengo Kimura	15:55
Hiromichi Fuyuki	Sub
Masahiro Chono	19:04
Tatsumi Fujinami	Sub
Osamu Kido	11:58
Super Strong Machine	Pin
Keiji Muto	17:22

Semifinals; August 6
Hiroshi Hase	Sub
Masahiro Chono	26:46
Tatsumi Fujinami	Sub
Keiji Muto	24:26

Final; August 7
Hiroshi Hase	Sub
Tatsumi Fujinami	21:49

=== 1994 ===
The 1994 G1 Climax returned to the round-robin format, this time with two blocks of six. It was held from August 3 to August 7, 1994. Guest natives included Yoshiaki Fujiwara from Pro Wrestling Fujiwara Gumi and Yoshiaki Yatsu from Social Progress Wrestling Federation (SPWF).

Final standings
Block A		Block B	
Masahiro Chono	8	Power Warrior	7
Keiji Muto	6	Hiroshi Hase	6
Riki Choshu	6	Shinya Hashimoto	6
Yoshiaki Yatsu	4	Tatsumi Fujinami	6
Yoshiaki Fujiwara	4	Shiro Koshinaka	5
Osamu Kido	2	Takayuki Iizuka	0

Block A	Chono	Choshu	Fujiwara	Kido	Muto	Yatsu
Chono	—N/a	Choshu (3:47)	Chono (9:31)	Chono (6:55)	Chono (27:28)	Chono (15:01)
Choshu	Choshu (3:47)	—N/a	Fujiwara (9:14)	Choshu (5:13)	Muto (15:32)	Choshu (10:11)
Fujiwara	Chono (9:31)	Fujiwara (8:26)	—N/a	Kido (9:45)	Fujiwara (12:12)	Yatsu (9:14)
Kido	Chono (6:55)	Choshu (5:13)	Kido (9:45)	—N/a	Muto (7:53)	Yatsu (8:25)
Muto	Chono (27:28)	Muto (15:32)	Fujiwara (12:12)	Muto (7:53)	—N/a	Muto (15:12)
Yatsu	Chono (15:01)	Choshu (10:11)	Yatsu (9:14)	Yatsu (8:25)	Muto (15:12)	—N/a
Block B	Fujinami	Hase	Hashimoto	Iizuka	Koshinaka	Warrior
Fujinami	—N/a	Hase (11:53)	Hashimoto (10:31)	Fujinami (7:09)	Fujinami (12:59)	Fujinami (5:25)
Hase	Hase (11:53)	—N/a	Hase (9:10)	Hase (17:32)	Koshinaka (20:44)	Warrior (16:50)
Hashimoto	Hashimoto (10:31)	Hase (9:10)	—N/a	Hashimoto (13:04)	Draw (30:00)	Draw (30:00)
Iizuka	Fujinami (7:09)	Hase (17:32)	Hashimoto (13:04)	—N/a	Koshinaka (14:02)	Warrior (17:33)
Koshinaka	Fujinami (12:59)	Koshinaka (20:44)	Draw (30:00)	Koshinaka (14:02)	—N/a	Warrior (14:10)
Warrior	Fujinami (5:25)	Warrior (16:50)	Draw (30:00)	Warrior (17:33)	Warrior (14:10)	—N/a

Final
A1	Masahiro Chono	Sub
B1	Power Warrior	21:51

=== 1995 ===
The 1995 G1 Climax was another eight-man round-robin tournament held August 11 to August 15, with the addition that the top two scorers from each block would advance to a four-man mini-tournament to decide the winner. Masahiro Chono advanced out of his block despite being tied with Ric Flair because of his faster match winning time over Shiro Koshinaka.

Final standings
Block A		Block B	
Keiji Muto	4	Shinya Hashimoto	4
Masahiro Chono	3	Scott Norton	4
Ric Flair	3	Hiroyoshi Tenzan	2
Shiro Koshinaka	2	Kensuke Sasaki	2

Block A	Chono	Flair	Koshinaka	Muto
Chono	—N/a	Draw (30:00)	Chono (11:10)	Muto (11:36)
Flair	Draw (30:00)	—N/a	Flair (17:17)	Muto (23:33)
Koshinaka	Chono (11:10)	Flair (17:17)	—N/a	Koshinaka (15:47)
Muto	Muto (11:36)	Muto (23:33)	Koshinaka (15:47)	—N/a
Block B	Hashimoto	Norton	Tenzan	Sasaki
Hashimoto	—N/a	Hashimoto (13:35)	Hashimoto (11:44)	Sasaki (21:46)
Norton	Hashimoto (13:35)	—N/a	Norton (15:08)	Norton (16:21)
Tenzan	Hashimoto (11:44)	Norton (15:08)	—N/a	Tenzan (12:51)
Sasaki	Sasaki (21:46)	Norton (16:21)	Tenzan (12:51)	—N/a

Semifinals
A1	Keiji Muto	Pin
B2	Scott Norton	17:07
A2	Masahiro Chono	Pin
B1	Shinya Hashimoto	10:05

Final
A1	Keiji Muto	Pin
B1	Shinya Hashimoto	24:08

=== 1996 ===
The 1996 G1 Climax was held from August 2 to August 6, 1996, and was a round-robin tournament featuring two blocks of five. Junji Hirata suffered an injury during his match with Kensuke Sasaki, which caused him to forfeit his remaining matches.

Final standings
Block A		Block B	
Riki Choshu	8	Masahiro Chono	6
Kensuke Sasaki	6	Shiro Koshinaka	4
Hiroyoshi Tenzan	4	Keiji Muto	4
Shinya Hashimoto	2	Kazuo Yamazaki	4
Junji Hirata	0	Satoshi Kojima	2

Block A	Choshu	Hashimoto	Hirata	Sasaki	Tenzan
Choshu	—N/a	Choshu (17:14)	Choshu (Forfeit)	Choshu (15:13)	Choshu (5:12)
Hashimoto	Choshu (17:14)	—N/a	Hashimoto (Forfeit)	Sasaki (9:13)	Tenzan (11:27)
Hirata	Choshu (Forfeit)	Hashimoto (Forfeit)	—N/a	Sasaki (5:08)	Tenzan (Forfeit)
Sasaki	Choshu (15:13)	Sasaki (9:13)	Sasaki (5:08)	—N/a	Sasaki (15:03)
Tenzan	Choshu (5:12)	Tenzan (11:27)	Tenzan (Forfeit)	Sasaki (15:03)	—N/a
Block B	Chono	Kojima	Koshinaka	Muto	Yamazaki
Chono	—N/a	Chono (13:46)	Koshinaka (22:10)	Chono (24:43)	Chono (12:25)
Kojima	Chono (13:46)	—N/a	Kojima (10:33)	Muto (15:21)	Yamazaki (9:56)
Koshinaka	Koshinaka (22:10)	Kojima (10:33)	—N/a	Muto (11:59)	Koshinaka (13:50)
Muto	Chono (24:43)	Muto (15:21)	Muto (11:59)	—N/a	Yamazaki (13:50)
Yamazaki	Chono (12:25)	Yamazaki (9:56)	Koshinaka (13:50)	Yamazaki (13:50)	—N/a

Final
A1	Riki Choshu	Sub
B1	Masahiro Chono	13:45

=== 1997 ===
The 1997 G1 Climax was a 14-man single-elimination tournament, with Kensuke Sasaki and Buff Bagwell receiving byes to the quarterfinals. The tournament was held from August 1 to August 3.

Round 1 August 1
Satoshi Kojima	Pin
Steven Regal	9:45
Hiroyoshi Tenzan	Pin
Tadao Yasuda	10:39
Masahiro Chono	Sub
Michiyoshi Ohara	18:39
Shinya Hashimoto	Stop
Kazuo Yamazaki	11:35
Junji Hirata	Pin
Scott Norton	6:31
The Great Muta	Pin
Manabu Nakanishi	10:25

Quarterfinals; August 2
Satoshi Kojima	Pin
Hiroyoshi Tenzan	11:43
Masahiro Chono	Sub
Shinya Hashimoto	5:45
Scott Norton	Pin
The Great Muta	6:31
Buff Bagwell	Pin
Kensuke Sasaki	8:04

Semifinals; August 3
Hiroyoshi Tenzan	Pin
Shinya Hashimoto	14:01
Scott Norton	Pin
Kensuke Sasaki	5:16

Final; August 3
Hiroyoshi Tenzan	Pin
Kensuke Sasaki	8:09

=== 1998 ===
The 1998 G1 Climax was another 16-man single-elimination tournament, held between July 31 and August 2. Genichiro Tenryu, who had separated from his own WAR promotion to become a freelancer since early in the year, was invited.

Round 1 July 31
Big Titan	Pin
Tadao Yasuda	10:35
Satoshi Kojima	Pin
Hiroyoshi Tenzan	11:08
Tatsutoshi Goto	Stop
Shinya Hashimoto	4:00
Keiji Muto	Pin
Genichiro Tenryu	21:37
Shiro Koshinaka	Pin
Osamu Nishimura	10:25
Masahiro Chono	Sub
Manabu Nakanishi	18:52
Michiyoshi Ohara	Pin
Kensuke Sasaki	10:59
Tatsumi Fujinami	Sub
Kazuo Yamazaki	7:51

Quarterfinals; August 1
Tadao Yasuda	Pin
Satoshi Kojima	13:38
Shinya Hashimoto	Pin
Genichiro Tenryu	13:13
Shiro Koshinaka	Sub
Masahiro Chono	16:03
Kensuke Sasaki	Sub
Kazuo Yamazaki	6:42

Semifinals; August 2
Satoshi Kojima	Sub
Shinya Hashimoto	13:51
Masahiro Chono	Sub
Kazuo Yamazaki	9:43

Final; August 2
Shinya Hashimoto	Pin
Kazuo Yamazaki	15:34

=== 1999 ===
The 1999 G1 Climax was a 12-man round-robin tournament, held from August 10 to August 15. This was the first of two years (with 2000) where head-to-head tiebreakers did not decide numerical ties; the winner of Block A was decided by a tiebreaker match, even though there was a clear winner in the two participants' league match.

Final standings
Block A		Block B	
Keiji Muto	8	Manabu Nakanishi	8
Yuji Nagata	8	Hiroyoshi Tenzan	6
Kensuke Sasaki	6	Shiro Koshinaka	6
Tatsumi Fujinami	6	Masahiro Chono	6
Satoshi Kojima	2	Shinya Hashimoto	4
Tadao Yasuda	0	Kazuo Yamazaki	0

Block A	Fujinami	Kojima	Muto	Nagata	Sasaki	Yasuda
Fujinami	—N/a	Fujinami (13:10)	Fujinami (17:36)	Nagata (12:03)	Sasaki (10:23)	Fujinami (3:29)
Kojima	Fujinami (13:10)	—N/a	Muto (11:40)	Nagata (19:51)	Sasaki (13:50)	Kojima (13:51)
Muto	Fujinami (17:36)	Muto (11:40)	—N/a	Muto (21:11)	Muto (20:56)	Muto (6:25)
Nagata	Nagata (12:03)	Nagata (19:51)	Muto (21:11)	—N/a	Nagata (14:43)	Nagata (10:26)
Sasaki	Sasaki (10:23)	Sasaki (13:50)	Muto (20:56)	Nagata (14:43)	—N/a	Sasaki (7:28)
Yasuda	Fujinami (3:29)	Kojima (13:51)	Muto (6:25)	Nagata (10:26)	Sasaki (7:28)	—N/a
Block B	Chono	Hashimoto	Koshinaka	Nakanishi	Tenzan	Yamazaki
Chono	—N/a	Chono (21:36)	Koshinaka (13:05)	Chono (10:21)	Tenzan (17:25)	Chono (10:18)
Hashimoto	Chono (21:36)	—N/a	Koshinaka (13:47)	Nakanishi (15:22)	Hashimoto (13:24)	Hashimoto (4:55)
Koshinaka	Koshinaka (13:05)	Koshinaka (13:47)	—N/a	Nakanishi (14:15)	Tenzan (15:14)	Koshinaka (Forfeit)
Nakanishi	Chono (10:21)	Nakanishi (15:22)	Nakanishi (14:15)	—N/a	Nakanishi (15:40)	Nakanishi (6:43)
Tenzan	Tenzan (17:25)	Hashimoto (13:24)	Tenzan (15:14)	Nakanishi (15:40)	—N/a	Tenzan (12:30)
Yamazaki	Chono (10:18)	Hashimoto (4:55)	Koshinaka (Forfeit)	Nakanishi (6:43)	Tenzan (12:30)	—N/a

Block A Decision			Final
			A1	Keiji Muto	Sub
A1	Keiji Muto	Sub	B1	Manabu Nakanishi	14:43
A2	Yuji Nagata	10:28

=== 2000 ===
The 2000 G1 Climax was a round-robin tournament, featuring four blocks of five, with each block champion advancing to a four-man tournament to decide that year's winner; it was held from August 7 to August 13. Also note that the points system was modified from the original: 1 point for a victory, and zero points for a draw or loss. Additionally, head-to-head tiebreakers did not decide numerical ties; the winners of Block A and Block C were decided by tiebreaker matches, even though there was a clear winner in the two participants' league match. This was the first time that two recognized junior heavyweights; IWGP titleholder Tatsuhito Takaiwa and previous champion Jyushin Thunder Liger, were invited to compete in the heavyweight tournament.

Final standings
Block A		Block B		Block C		Block D	
Yuji Nagata	3	Kensuke Sasaki	3	Hiroyoshi Tenzan	3	Masahiro Chono	3
Takashi Iizuka	3	Satoshi Kojima	2	Manabu Nakanishi	3	Junji Hirata	2
Tatsumi Fujinami	2	Brian Johnston	2	Tadao Yasuda	2	Shiro Koshinaka	2
Jyushin Thunder Liger	1	Osamu Kido	0	Osamu Nishimura	2	Yutaka Yoshie	2
Tatsutoshi Goto	1	Hiro Saito	0	Kenzo Suzuki	0	Tatsuhito Takaiwa	1

Block A	Fujinami	Goto	Iizuka	Liger	Nagata
Fujinami	—N/a	Fujinami (6:42)	Iizuka (11:46)	Fujinami (10:33)	Nagata (12:25)
Goto	Fujinami (6:42)	—N/a	Iizuka (9:42)	Liger (7:17)	Goto (11:41)
Iizuka	Iizuka (11:46)	Iizuka (9:42)	—N/a	Iizuka (15:13)	Nagata (16:38)
Liger	Fujinami (10:33)	Liger (7:17)	Iizuka (15:13)	—N/a	Nagata (12:06)
Nagata	Nagata (12:25)	Goto (11:41)	Nagata (16:38)	Nagata (12:06)	—N/a
Block B	Johnston	Kido	Kojima	Saito	Sasaki
Johnston	—N/a	Johnston (5:38)	Kojima (10:08)	Johnston (5:18)	Sasaki (6:48)
Kido	Johnston (5:38)	—N/a	Kojima (9:55)	Draw (6:29)	Sasaki (4:21)
Kojima	Kojima (10:08)	Kojima (9:55)	—N/a	Draw (5:54)	Sasaki (19:39)
Saito	Johnston (5:18)	Draw (6:29)	Draw (5:54)	—N/a	Draw (5:37)
Sasaki	Sasaki (6:48)	Sasaki (4:21)	Sasaki (19:39)	Draw (5:37)	—N/a
Block C	Nakanishi	Nishimura	Suzuki	Tenzan	Yasuda
Nakanishi	—N/a	Nakanishi (13:04)	Nakanishi (8:43)	Tenzan (18:21)	Nakanishi (9:23)
Nishimura	Nakanishi (13:04)	—N/a	Nishimura (7:37)	Nishimura (14:22)	Yasuda (11:47)
Suzuki	Nakanishi (8:43)	Nishimura (7:37)	—N/a	Tenzan (13:24)	Yasuda (10:43)
Tenzan	Tenzan (18:21)	Nishimura (14:22)	Tenzan (13:24)	—N/a	Tenzan (11:40)
Yasuda	Nakanishi (9:23)	Yasuda (11:47)	Yasuda (10:43)	Tenzan (11:40)	—N/a
Block D	Chono	Hirata	Koshinaka	Takaiwa	Yoshie
Chono	—N/a	Chono (11:42)	Koshinaka (12:40)	Chono (14:22)	Chono (20:16)
Hirata	Chono (11:42)	—N/a	Hirata (8:24)	Hirata (11:08)	Yoshie (11:19)
Koshinaka	Koshinaka (12:40)	Hirata (8:24)	—N/a	Takaiwa (9:04)	Koshinaka (10:38)
Takaiwa	Chono (14:22)	Hirata (11:08)	Takaiwa (9:04)	—N/a	Yoshie (13:48)
Yoshie	Chono (20:16)	Yoshie (11:19)	Koshinaka (10:38)	Yoshie (13:48)	—N/a

Tiebreakers
A1	Yuji Nagata	Sub
A2	Takashi Iizuka	10:48
C1	Hiroyoshi Tenzan	Sub
C2	Manabu Nakanishi	11:26

Semifinals
A1	Yuji Nagata	Pin
B1	Kensuke Sasaki	15:12
C2	Manabu Nakanishi	Sub
D1	Masahiro Chono	9:33

Final
B1	Kensuke Sasaki	Sub
C2	Manabu Nakanishi	19:42

=== 2001 ===
The 2001 G1 Climax was a two-block, twelve-man round-robin tournament held from August 4 to August 12. It returned to the original method of scoring, and also reintroduced the 1995 G1's format of each block's top two scorers advancing to the final four. Jyushin Thunder Liger and Minoru Tanaka were the junior heavyweight invitees.

Final standings
Block A		Block B	
Yuji Nagata	7	Keiji Muto	8
Tadao Yasuda	6	Masahiro Chono	6
Manabu Nakanishi	6	Hiroyoshi Tenzan	6
Kazunari Murakami	5	Satoshi Kojima	4
Tatsumi Fujinami	4	Jyushin Thunder Liger	3
Minoru Tanaka	2	Osamu Nishimura	3

Block A	Fujinami	Murakami	Nagata	Nakanishi	Tanaka	Yasuda
Fujinami	—N/a	Fujinami (0:36)	Nagata (11:30)	Nakanishi (5:18)	Fujinami (8:38)	Yasuda (5:14)
Murakami	Fujinami (0:36)	—N/a	Draw (8:01)	Murakami (2:02)	Tanaka (5:10)	Murakami (3:48)
Nagata	Nagata (11:30)	Draw (8:01)	—N/a	Nakanishi (14:15)	Nagata (12:39)	Nagata (8:11)
Nakanishi	Nakanishi (5:18)	Murakami (2:02)	Nakanishi (14:15)	—N/a	Nakanishi (9:47)	Yasuda (7:11)
Tanaka	Fujinami (8:38)	Tanaka (5:10)	Nagata (12:39)	Nakanishi (9:47)	—N/a	Yasuda (7:35)
Yasuda	Yasuda (5:14)	Murakami (3:48)	Nagata (8:11)	Yasuda (7:11)	Yasuda (7:35)	—N/a
Block B	Chono	Kojima	Liger	Muto	Nishimura	Tenzan
Chono	—N/a	Kojima (17:18)	Chono (14:16)	Muto (8:14)	Chono (26:16)	Chono (17:53)
Kojima	Kojima (17:18)	—N/a	Liger (16:01)	Kojima (17:30)	Nishimura (19:23)	Tenzan (20:53)
Liger	Chono (14:16)	Liger (16:01)	—N/a	Muto (14:24)	Draw (30:00)	Tenzan (15:44)
Muto	Muto (8:14)	Kojima (17:30)	Muto (14:24)	—N/a	Muto (16:08)	Muto (18:35)
Nishimura	Chono (26:16)	Nishimura (19:23)	Draw (30:00)	Muto (16:08)	—N/a	Tenzan (24:06)
Tenzan	Chono (17:53)	Tenzan (20:53)	Tenzan (15:44)	Muto (18:35)	Tenzan (24:06)	—N/a

Semifinals
B1	Keiji Muto	Sub
A2	Tadao Yasuda	11:22
B2	Masahiro Chono	Sub
A1	Yuji Nagata	13:44

Final
B1	Keiji Muto	Sub
A1	Yuji Nagata	22:03

=== 2002 ===
The 2002 G1 Climax was identical in structure to the previous year's, and was held from August 3 to August 11.

Final standings
Block A		Block B	
Yoshihiro Takayama	8	Masahiro Chono	7
Hiroyoshi Tenzan	6	Osamu Nishimura	5
Kensuke Sasaki	6	Manabu Nakanishi	5
Hiroshi Tanahashi	4	Yuji Nagata	5
Shiro Koshinaka	4	Kenzo Suzuki	4
Yutaka Yoshie	2	Tadao Yasuda	4

Block A	Koshinaka	Sasaki	Takayama	Tanahashi	Tenzan	Yoshie
Koshinaka	—N/a	Sasaki (8:33)	Takayama (12:00)	Tanahashi (8:52)	Koshinaka (11:02)	Koshinaka (10:54)
Sasaki	Sasaki (8:33)	—N/a	Sasaki (12:11)	Tanahashi (1:40)	Tenzan (15:52)	Sasaki (0:41)
Takayama	Takayama (12:00)	Sasaki (12:11)	—N/a	Takayama (9:24)	Takayama (13:18)	Takayama (11:28)
Tanahashi	Tanahashi (8:52)	Tanahashi (1:40)	Takayama (9:24)	—N/a	Tenzan (14:49)	Yoshie (10:38)
Tenzan	Koshinaka (11:02)	Tenzan (15:52)	Takayama (13:18)	Tenzan (14:49)	—N/a	Tenzan (15:53)
Yoshie	Koshinaka (10:54)	Sasaki (0:41)	Takayama (11:28)	Yoshie (10:38)	Tenzan (15:53)	—N/a
Block B	Chono	Nagata	Nakanishi	Nishimura	Suzuki	Yasuda
Chono	—N/a	Nagata (16:00)	Chono (16:17)	Draw (30:00)	Chono (17:33)	Chono (Forfeit)
Nagata	Nagata (16:00)	—N/a	Nakanishi (17:21)	Draw (30:00)	Nagata (14:51)	Yasuda (11:10)
Nakanishi	Chono (16:17)	Nakanishi (17:21)	—N/a	Draw (30:00)	Nakanishi (11:17)	Yasuda (2:15)
Nishimura	Draw (30:00)	Draw (30:00)	Draw (30:00)	—N/a	Suzuki (18:10)	Nishimura (1:36)
Suzuki	Chono (17:33)	Nagata (14:51)	Nakanishi (11:17)	Suzuki (18:10)	—N/a	Suzuki (0:37)
Yasuda	Chono (Forfeit)	Yasuda (11:10)	Yasuda (2:15)	Nishimura (1:36)	Suzuki (0:37)	—N/a

Tiebreaker
B3	Manabu Nakanishi	Sub
B2	Osamu Nishimura	5:49

Semifinals
A1	Yoshihiro Takayama	Pin
B2	Osamu Nishimura	22:38
B1	Masahiro Chono	Sub
A2	Hiroyoshi Tenzan	22:03

Final
A1	Yoshihiro Takayama	Pin
B1	Masahiro Chono	20:23

=== 2003 ===
The 2003 G1 Climax was another 12-man round-robin tournament, held from August 10 to August 17. Jun Akiyama from Pro Wrestling Noah, along with freelancer Yoshihiro Takayama were invitees.

Final standings
Block A		Block B	
Jun Akiyama	7	Yoshihiro Takayama	8
Hiroyoshi Tenzan	6	Yuji Nagata	5
Masahiro Chono	5	Katsuyori Shibata	5
Manabu Nakanishi	4	Yutaka Yoshie	4
Osamu Nishimura	4	Shinsuke Nakamura	4
Hiroshi Tanahashi	4	Tadao Yasuda	4

Block A	Akiyama	Chono	Nakanishi	Nishimura	Tanahashi	Tenzan
Akiyama	—N/a	Draw (30:00)	Akiyama (16:35)	Nishimura (27:17)	Akiyama (16:08)	Akiyama (19:43)
Chono	Draw (30:00)	—N/a	Nakanishi (11:39)	Chono (24:08)	Chono (13:11)	Tenzan (21:21)
Nakanishi	Akiyama (16:35)	Nakanishi (11:39)	—N/a	Nishimura (13:45)	Nakanishi (14:04)	Tenzan (14:50)
Nishimura	Nishimura (27:17)	Chono (24:08)	Nishimura (13:45)	—N/a	Tanahashi (14:03)	Tenzan (25:56)
Tanahashi	Akiyama (16:08)	Chono (13:11)	Nakanishi (14:04)	Tanahashi (14:03)	—N/a	Tanahashi (15:14)
Tenzan	Akiyama (19:43)	Tenzan (21:21)	Tenzan (14:50)	Tenzan (25:56)	Tanahashi (15:14)	—N/a
Block B	Nagata	Nakamura	Shibata	Takayama	Yasuda	Yoshie
Nagata	—N/a	Nagata (11:32)	Draw (13:17)	Takayama (14:05)	Yasuda (12:21)	Nagata (12:51)
Nakamura	Nagata (11:32)	—N/a	Nakamura (10:14)	Takayama (7:08)	Nakamura (7:38)	Yoshie (12:31)
Shibata	Draw (13:17)	Nakamura (10:14)	—N/a	Takayama (6:38)	Shibata (1:14)	Shibata (9:17)
Takayama	Takayama (14:05)	Takayama (7:08)	Takayama (6:38)	—N/a	Yasuda (11:16)	Takayama (12:31)
Yasuda	Yasuda (12:21)	Nakamura (7:38)	Shibata (1:14)	Yasuda (11:16)	—N/a	Yoshie (13:01)
Yoshie	Nagata (12:51)	Yoshie (12:31)	Shibata (9:17)	Takayama (12:31)	Yoshie (13:01)	—N/a

Block B Decision
B2	Yuji Nagata	KO
B3	Katsuyori Shibata	4:11

Semifinals
A1	Jun Akiyama	Pin
B2	Yuji Nagata	16:11
B1	Yoshihiro Takayama	KO
A2	Hiroyoshi Tenzan	21:13

Final
A1	Jun Akiyama	Sub
A2	Hiroyoshi Tenzan	31:43

=== 2004 ===
The 2004 G1 Climax was a two-block, sixteen-man tournament held from August 7 to August 15. As well as the increased number of participants, it introduced a format in which the second and third runners-up from each block would advance to a four-man tournament, the two finalists of which would advance to a second four-man tournament also featuring each block winner; the eventual winner of this tournament would win the G1 Climax. Also, it would seem that, for this particular year, matches which ended in a double countout or double disqualification would result in zero points for both competitors.

Final standings
Block A		Block B	
Katsuyori Shibata	8	Hiroshi Tanahashi	12
Genichiro Tenryu	8	Hiroyoshi Tenzan	11
Shinsuke Nakamura	8	Kensuke Sasaki	9
Masahiro Chono	8	Koji Kanemoto	6
Minoru Suzuki	8	Manabu Nakanishi	6
Yuji Nagata	8	Osamu Nishimura	6
Blue Wolf	4	Togi Makabe	4
Yutaka Yoshie	2	Yoshihiro Takayama	2

Block A	Wolf	Chono	Nagata	Nakamura	Shibata	Suzuki	Tenryu	Yoshie
Wolf	—N/a	Chono (14:29)	Nagata (13:35)	Nakamura (8:15)	Wolf (11:46)	Suzuki (13:34)	Tenryu (6:09)	Wolf (14:04)
Chono	Chono (14:29)	—N/a	Chono (16:26)	Draw (14:36)^{1}	Shibata (15:05)	Chono (17:32)	Tenryu (0:38)	Chono (12:57)
Nagata	Nagata (13:35)	Chono (16:26)	—N/a	Nakamura (13:08)	Nagata (12:44)	Suzuki (17:39)	Nagata (11:28)	Nagata (13:50)
Nakamura	Nakamura (8:15)	Draw (14:36)^{1}	Nakamura (13:08)	—N/a	Shibata (12:00)	Nakamura (11:58)	Tenryu (14:43)	Nakamura (11:33)
Shibata	Wolf (11:46)	Shibata (15:05)	Nagata (12:44)	Shibata (12:00)	—N/a	Suzuki (7:20)	Shibata (7:15)	Shibata (10:22)
Suzuki	Suzuki (13:34)	Chono (17:32)	Suzuki (17:39)	Nakamura (11:58)	Suzuki (7:20)	—N/a	Tenryu (13:01)	Suzuki (9:12)
Tenryu	Tenryu (6:09)	Tenryu (0:38)	Nagata (11:28)	Tenryu (14:43)	Shibata (7:15)	Tenryu (13:01)	—N/a	Yoshie (4:07)
Yoshie	Wolf (14:04)	Chono (12:57)	Nagata (13:50)	Nakamura (11:33)	Shibata (10:22)	Suzuki (9:12)	Yoshie (4:07)	—N/a
Block B	Kanemoto	Makabe	Nakanishi	Nishimura	Sasaki	Takayama	Tanahashi	Tenzan
Kanemoto	—N/a	Kanemoto (13:50)	Kanemoto (9:54)	Nishimura (14:03)	Sasaki (16:55)	Kanemoto (Forfeit)	Tanahashi (15:45)	Tenzan (16:55)
Makabe	Kanemoto (13:50)	—N/a	Nakanishi (7:40)	Makabe (12:51)	Sasaki (6:34)	Makabe (Forfeit)	Tanahashi (11:35)	Tenzan (11:33)
Nakanishi	Kanemoto (9:54)	Nakanishi (7:40)	—N/a	Nakanishi (14:36)	Sasaki (17:57)	Nakanishi (15:48)	Tanahashi (9:12)	Tenzan (12:47)
Nishimura	Nishimura (14:03)	Makabe (12:51)	Nakanishi (14:36)	—N/a	Sasaki (14:00)	Nishimura (Forfeit)	Tanahashi (16:23)	Nishimura (20:02)
Sasaki	Sasaki (16:55)	Sasaki (6:34)	Sasaki (17:57)	Sasaki (14:00)	—N/a	Takayama (14:40)	Tanahashi (12:00)	Draw (30:00)
Takayama	Kanemoto (Forfeit)	Makabe (Forfeit)	Nakanishi (15:48)	Nishimura (Forfeit)	Takayama (14:40)	—N/a	Tanahashi (Forfeit)	Tenzan (Forfeit)
Tanahashi	Tanahashi (15:45)	Tanahashi (11:35)	Tanahashi (9:12)	Tanahashi (16:23)	Tanahashi (12:00)	Tanahashi (Forfeit)	—N/a	Tenzan (15:15)
Tenzan	Tenzan (16:55)	Tenzan (11:33)	Tenzan (12:47)	Nishimura (20:02)	Draw (30:00)	Tenzan (Forfeit)	Tenzan (15:15)	—N/a

^{1} This was a double countout, and so neither Chono nor Nakamura received any points.

Block A Decision
A4	Masahiro Chono	DQ
A3	Shinsuke Nakamura	4:39

Quarterfinals
B2	Hiroyoshi Tenzan	Sub
A3	Shinsuke Nakamura	13:06
A2	Genichiro Tenryu	Pin
B3	Kensuke Sasaki	8:11

Semifinals
A1	Katsuyori Shibata	KO
B2	Hiroyoshi Tenzan	7:11
B1	Hiroshi Tanahashi	Pin
A2	Genichiro Tenryu	6:34

Final
B2	Hiroyoshi Tenzan	21:01
B1	Hiroshi Tanahashi	Sub

=== 2005 ===
The 2005 G1 Climax was another 16-man round-robin tournament, held from August 4 to August 14. It returned to the format of 2003, eliminating the "quarterfinals" seen in 2004, and simply bringing each block's top two scorers into the final four.

Final standings
Block A		Block B	
Masahiro Chono	10	Kazuyuki Fujita	14
Toshiaki Kawada	10	Shinsuke Nakamura	11
Yuji Nagata	8	Manabu Nakanishi	10
Hiroyoshi Tenzan	8	Hiroshi Tanahashi	7
Minoru Suzuki	6	Yutaka Yoshie	6
Kendo Kashin	5	Tatsutoshi Goto	4
Osamu Nishimura	5	Toru Yano	4
Tatsumi Fujinami	4	Togi Makabe	0

Block A	Chono	Fujinami	Kashin	Kawada	Nagata	Nishimura	Suzuki	Tenzan
Chono	—N/a	Chono (11:08)	Chono (1:45)	Chono (12:14)	Chono (17:02)	Nishimura (20:55)	Chono (17:50)	Tenzan (18:33)
Fujinami	Chono (11:08)	—N/a	Fujinami (4:50)	Kawada (12:03)	Nagata (9:37)	Nishimura (11:29)	Fujinami (10:17)	Tenzan (12:49)
Kashin	Chono (1:45)	Fujinami (4:50)	—N/a	Kashin (11:16)	Nagata (13:08)	Kashin (15:07)	Draw (12:17)	Tenzan (12:19)
Kawada	Chono (12:14)	Kawada (12:03)	Kashin (11:16)	—N/a	Kawada (26:55)	Kawada (17:00)	Kawada (17:11)	Kawada (19:08)
Nagata	Chono (17:02)	Nagata (9:37)	Nagata (13:08)	Kawada (26:55)	—N/a	Nagata (19:34)	Suzuki (12:06)	Nagata (16:55)
Nishimura	Nishimura (20:55)	Nishimura (11:29)	Kashin (15:07)	Kawada (17:00)	Nagata (19:34)	—N/a	Draw (30:00)	Tenzan (18:46)
Suzuki	Chono (17:50)	Fujinami (10:17)	Draw (12:17)	Kawada (17:11)	Suzuki (12:06)	Draw (30:00)	—N/a	Suzuki (13:50)
Tenzan	Tenzan (18:33)	Tenzan (12:49)	Tenzan (12:19)	Kawada (19:08)	Nagata (16:55)	Tenzan (18:46)	Suzuki (13:50)	—N/a
Block B	Fujita	Goto	Makabe	Nakamura	Nakanishi	Tanahashi	Yano	Yoshie
Fujita	—N/a	Fujita (3:19)	Fujita (Forfeit)	Fujita (6:25)	Fujita (8:02)	Fujita (9:14)	Fujita (3:41)	Fujita (8:45)
Goto	Fujita (3:19)	—N/a	Goto (Forfeit)	Nakamura (6:11)	Nakanishi (7:26)	Tanahashi (9:09)	Goto (4:16)	Yoshie (8:22)
Makabe	Fujita (Forfeit)	Goto (Forfeit)	—N/a	Nakamura (2:30)	Nakanishi (Forfeit)	Tanahashi (Forfeit)	Yano (Forfeit)	Yoshie (12:23)
Nakamura	Fujita (6:25)	Nakamura (6:11)	Nakamura (2:30)	—N/a	Nakamura (14:38)	Nakamura (13:35)	Draw (5:15)	Nakamura (10:49)
Nakanishi	Fujita (8:02)	Nakanishi (7:26)	Nakanishi (Forfeit)	Nakamura (14:38)	—N/a	Nakanishi (13:50)	Nakanishi (5:17)	Nakanishi (12:40)
Tanahashi	Fujita (9:14)	Tanahashi (9:09)	Tanahashi (Forfeit)	Nakamura (13:35)	Nakanishi (13:50)	—N/a	Draw (30:00)	Tanahashi (15:01)
Yano	Fujita (3:41)	Goto (4:16)	Yano (Forfeit)	Draw (5:15)	Nakanishi (5:17)	Draw (30:00)	—N/a	Yoshie (12:39)
Yoshie	Fujita (8:45)	Yoshie (8:22)	Yoshie (12:23)	Nakamura (10:49)	Nakanishi (12:40)	Tanahashi (15:01)	Yoshie (12:39)	—N/a

Semifinals
A1	Masahiro Chono	Sub
B2	Shinsuke Nakamura	11:35
B1	Kazuyuki Fujita	Pin
A2	Toshiaki Kawada	6:23

Final
A1	Masahiro Chono	Pin
B1	Kazuyuki Fujita	8:52

=== 2006 ===
The 2006 G1 Climax was a 10-man round-robin tournament held from August 6 to August 13.

Final standings
Block A		Block B	
Satoshi Kojima	7	Hiroyoshi Tenzan	8
Giant Bernard	5	Koji Kanemoto	5
Hiroshi Tanahashi	4	Yuji Nagata	4
Jyushin Thunder Liger	2	Togi Makabe	3
Manabu Nakanishi	2	Naofumi Yamamoto	0

Block A	Bernard	Kojima	Liger	Nakanishi	Tanahashi
Bernard	—N/a	Draw (25:54)	Bernard (6:53)	Nakanishi (11:41)	Bernard (17:54)
Kojima	Draw (25:54)	—N/a	Kojima (14:09)	Kojima (18:17)	Kojima (21:55)
Liger	Bernard (6:53)	Kojima (14:09)	—N/a	Liger (8:32)	Tanahashi (14:18)
Nakanishi	Nakanishi (11:41)	Kojima (18:17)	Liger (8:32)	—N/a	Tanahashi (14:51)
Tanahashi	Bernard (17:54)	Kojima (21:55)	Tanahashi (14:18)	Tanahashi (14:51)	—N/a
Block B	Kanemoto	Makabe	Nagata	Tenzan	Yamamoto
Kanemoto	—N/a	Kanemoto (11:25)	Draw (30:00)	Tenzan (13:07)	Kanemoto (13:14)
Makabe	Kanemoto (11:25)	—N/a	Draw (15:44)	Tenzan (12:23)	Makabe (11:18)
Nagata	Draw (30:00)	Draw (15:44)	—N/a	Tenzan (15:41)	Nagata (10:28)
Tenzan	Tenzan (13:07)	Tenzan (12:23)	Tenzan (15:41)	—N/a	Tenzan (12:28)
Yamamoto	Kanemoto (13:14)	Makabe (11:18)	Nagata (10:28)	Tenzan (12:28)	—N/a

Semifinals
A1	Satoshi Kojima	Pin
B2	Koji Kanemoto	15:41
B1	Hiroyoshi Tenzan	Sub
A2	Giant Bernard	11:13

Final
A1	Satoshi Kojima	Pin
B1	Hiroyoshi Tenzan	27:36

=== 2007 ===
The 2007 G1 Climax, featuring twelve men in two blocks, was held from August 5 to August 12.

Final standings
Block A		Block B	
Togi Makabe	6	Shinsuke Nakamura	7
Yuji Nagata	6	Hiroshi Tanahashi	6
Akebono	5	Toru Yano	5
Giant Bernard	5	Shiro Koshinaka	4
Hiroyoshi Tenzan	4	Milano Collection A.T.	4
Masahiro Chono	4	Manabu Nakanishi	4

Block A	Bernard	Chono	Makabe	Nagata	Tenzan	Akebono
Bernard	—N/a	Bernard (3:40)	Makabe (8:34)	Nagata (13:58)	Bernard (13:24)	Draw (9:57)
Chono	Bernard (3:40)	—N/a	Makabe (11:17)	Chono (16:15)	Tenzan (17:20)	Chono (7:45)
Makabe	Makabe (8:34)	Makabe (11:17)	—N/a	Makabe (15:44)	Tenzan (15:45)	Akebono (7:48)
Nagata	Nagata (13:58)	Chono (16:15)	Makabe (15:44)	—N/a	Nagata (10:41)	Nagata (6:32)
Tenzan	Bernard (13:24)	Tenzan (17:20)	Tenzan (15:45)	Nagata (10:41)	—N/a	Akebono (9:18)
Akebono	Draw (9:57)	Chono (7:45)	Akebono (7:48)	Nagata (6:32)	Akebono (9:18)	—N/a
Block B	Koshinaka	Milano	Nakamura	Nakanishi	Tanahashi	Yano
Koshinaka	—N/a	Milano (10:29)	Koshinaka (10:34)	Koshinaka (10:30)	Tanahashi (17:04)	Yano (9:52)
Milano	Milano (10:29)	—N/a	Nakamura (12:30)	Nakanishi (5:29)	Tanahashi (9:59)	Milano (6:00)
Nakamura	Koshinaka (10:34)	Nakamura (12:30)	—N/a	Nakamura (12:38)	Draw (30:00)	Nakamura (12:13)
Nakanishi	Koshinaka (10:30)	Nakanishi (5:29)	Nakamura (12:38)	—N/a	Nakanishi (12:13)	Yano (10:41)
Tanahashi	Tanahashi (17:04)	Tanahashi (9:59)	Draw (30:00)	Nakanishi (12:13)	—N/a	Draw (12:27)
Yano	Yano (9:52)	Milano (6:00)	Nakamura (12:13)	Yano (10:41)	Draw (12:27)	—N/a

Semifinals
A1	Togi Makabe	Pin
B2	Hiroshi Tanahashi	15:24
B1	Shinsuke Nakamura	Stop
A2	Yuji Nagata	18:22

Final
B2	Hiroshi Tanahashi	Pin
A2	Yuji Nagata	19:02

=== 2008 ===
The 2008 G1 Climax, featuring fourteen men in two blocks, was held from August 9 to August 17 over seven shows.

Final standings
Block A		Block B	
Togi Makabe	8	Hirooki Goto	8
Satoshi Kojima	7	Shinsuke Nakamura	8
Shinjiro Otani	7	Toshiaki Kawada	7
Manabu Nakanishi	6	Yutaka Yoshie	7
Giant Bernard	6	Yuji Nagata	6
Hiroshi Tanahashi	4	Toru Yano	4
Wataru Inoue	4	Hiroyoshi Tenzan	2

Block A	Bernard	Inoue	Kojima	Makabe	Nakanishi	Otani	Tanahashi
Bernard	—N/a	Inoue (7:32)	Bernard (13:27)	Makabe (10:56)	Nakanishi (13:17)	Bernard (14:12)	Bernard (13:51)
Inoue	Inoue (7:32)	—N/a	Kojima (12:39)	Makabe (12:59)	Inoue (8:38)	Otani (9:56)	Tanahashi (14:07)
Kojima	Bernard (13:27)	Kojima (12:39)	—N/a	Makabe (12:26)	Kojima (15:15)	Draw (30:00)	Kojima (16:57)
Makabe	Makabe (10:56)	Makabe (12:59)	Makabe (12:26)	—N/a	Nakanishi (9:31)	Otani (12:11)	Makabe (20:14)
Nakanishi	Nakanishi (13:17)	Inoue (8:38)	Kojima (15:15)	Nakanishi (9:31)	—N/a	Otani (12:21)	Nakanishi (17:33)
Otani	Bernard (14:12)	Otani (9:56)	Draw (30:00)	Otani (12:11)	Otani (12:21)	—N/a	Tanahashi (12:44)
Tanahashi	Bernard (13:51)	Tanahashi (14:07)	Kojima (16:57)	Makabe (20:14)	Nakanishi (17:33)	Tanahashi (12:44)	—N/a
Block B	Goto	Kawada	Nagata	Nakamura	Tenzan	Yano	Yoshie
Goto	—N/a	Kawada (13:24)	Goto (12:12)	Goto (14:22)	Goto (12:43)	Goto (9:11)	Yoshie (14:28)
Kawada	Kawada (13:24)	—N/a	Kawada (16:38)	Nakamura (14:36)	Tenzan (19:24)	Kawada (8:38)	Draw (30:00)
Nagata	Goto (12:12)	Kawada (16:38)	—N/a	Nakamura (15:52)	Nagata (11:34)	Nagata (13:10)	Nagata (15:38)
Nakamura	Goto (14:22)	Nakamura (14:36)	Nakamura (15:52)	—N/a	Nakamura (12:16)	Yano (12:53)	Nakamura (15:20)
Tenzan	Goto (12:43)	Tenzan (19:24)	Nagata (11:34)	Nakamura (12:16)	—N/a	Yano (11:50)	Yoshie (15:09)
Yano	Goto (9:11)	Kawada (8:38)	Nagata (13:10)	Yano (12:53)	Yano (11:50)	—N/a	Yoshie (11:38)
Yoshie	Yoshie (14:28)	Draw (30:00)	Nagata (15:38)	Nakamura (15:20)	Yoshie (15:09)	Yoshie (11:38)	—N/a

Final
A1	Togi Makabe	Pin
B1	Hirooki Goto	22:25

=== 2009 ===
The 2009 G1 Climax, featuring fourteen men in two blocks, was held from August 7 to August 16 over eight shows. In a tournament first, the exact tie for first place in Block A between Togi Makabe and Hiroshi Tanahashi was decided by a coin toss.

Final standings
Block A		Block B	
Togi Makabe	7	Shinsuke Nakamura	12
Hiroshi Tanahashi	7	Takashi Sugiura	7
Masato Tanaka	7	Hirooki Goto	6
Toru Yano	6	Manabu Nakanishi	6
Takao Omori	6	Yuji Nagata	5
Giant Bernard	5	Hiroyoshi Tenzan	4
Tajiri	4	Takashi Iizuka	2

Block A	Bernard	Makabe	Omori	Tajiri	Tanahashi	Tanaka	Yano
Bernard	—N/a	Bernard (12:15)	Bernard (10:11)	Tajiri (10:33)	Tanahashi (19:57)	Draw (13:07)	Yano (9:50)
Makabe	Bernard (12:15)	—N/a	Omori (14:40)	Makabe (12:17)	Draw (30:00)	Makabe (12:29)	Makabe (13:18)
Omori	Bernard (10:11)	Omori (14:40)	—N/a	Omori (1:05)	Omori (18:20)	Tanaka (13:08)	Yano (9:11)
Tajiri	Tajiri (10:33)	Makabe (12:17)	Omori (1:05)	—N/a	Tajiri (18:03)	Tanaka (11:24)	Yano (11:34)
Tanahashi	Tanahashi (19:57)	Draw (30:00)	Omori (18:20)	Tajiri (18:03)	—N/a	Tanahashi (22:28)	Tanahashi (18:39)
Tanaka	Draw (13:07)	Makabe (12:29)	Tanaka (13:08)	Tanaka (11:24)	Tanahashi (22:28)	—N/a	Tanaka (10:44)
Yano	Yano (9:50)	Makabe (13:18)	Yano (9:11)	Yano (11:34)	Tanahashi (18:39)	Tanaka (10:44)	—N/a
Block B	Goto	Iizuka	Nagata	Nakamura	Nakanishi	Sugiura	Tenzan
Goto	—N/a	Goto (12:24)	Nagata (17:48)	Nakamura (16:42)	Goto (14:55)	Sugiura (13:32)	Goto (6:57)
Iizuka	Goto (12:24)	—N/a	Iizuka (7:53)	Nakamura (5:11)	Nakanishi (11:58)	Sugiura (9:05)	Tenzan (10:59)
Nagata	Nagata (17:48)	Iizuka (7:53)	—N/a	Nakamura (17:41)	Nakanishi (21:58)	Draw (30:00)	Nagata (11:01)
Nakamura	Nakamura (16:42)	Nakamura (5:11)	Nakamura (17:41)	—N/a	Nakamura (7:10)	Nakamura (13:51)	Nakamura (8:41)
Nakanishi	Goto (14:55)	Nakanishi (11:58)	Nakanishi (21:58)	Nakamura (7:10)	—N/a	Sugiura (14:22)	Nakanishi (10:30)
Sugiura	Sugiura (13:32)	Sugiura (9:05)	Draw (30:00)	Nakamura (13:51)	Sugiura (14:22)	—N/a	Tenzan (12:42)
Tenzan	Goto (6:57)	Tenzan (10:59)	Nagata (11:01)	Nakamura (8:41)	Nakanishi (10:30)	Tenzan (12:42)	—N/a

Semifinals
A1	Togi Makabe	Pin
B2	Takashi Sugiura	11:57
B1	Shinsuke Nakamura	Pin
A2	Hiroshi Tanahashi	13:31

Final
A1	Togi Makabe	Pin
B1	Shinsuke Nakamura	18:29

=== 2010 ===
The 2010 version of the G1 Climax tournament was announced in late May 2010 and was the 20th anniversary of the G1 Climax tournament. The tournament took place over eight shows between August 6 and August 15, 2010. Naomichi Marufuji was scheduled to participate in the tournament, but was forced to pull out after suffering an arm injury on July 25. On August 5, NJPW announced that Prince Devitt would replace Marufuji in the tournament. With his victory, freelancer Satoshi Kojima became the third man to have won both the G1 Climax and All Japan Pro Wrestling's Champion Carnival.

Final standings
Block A		Block B	
Hiroshi Tanahashi	9	Satoshi Kojima	10
Togi Makabe	8	Shinsuke Nakamura	9
Manabu Nakanishi	8	Go Shiozaki	9
Toru Yano	8	Hirooki Goto	8
Prince Devitt	8	Yuji Nagata	8
Tetsuya Naito	7	Giant Bernard	6
Strong Man	4	Yujiro Takahashi	4
Karl Anderson	4	Wataru Inoue	2

Block A	Anderson	Devitt	Makabe	Naito	Nakanishi	Strong Man	Tanahashi	Yano
Anderson	—N/a	Devitt (10:44)	Makabe (11:07)	Naito (11:52)	Nakanishi (7:29)	Strong Man (6:30)	Anderson (11:42)	Anderson (9:16)
Devitt	Devitt (10:44)	—N/a	Makabe (13:36)	Devitt (11:42)	Nakanishi (9:23)	Devitt (7:36)	Devitt (11:35)	Yano (7:26)
Makabe	Makabe (11:07)	Makabe (13:36)	—N/a	Naito (14:34)	Makabe (10:52)	Makabe (5:57)	Tanahashi (11:58)	Yano (7:18)
Naito	Naito (11:52)	Devitt (11:42)	Naito (14:34)	—N/a	Naito (10:52)	Strong Man (7:55)	Draw (30:00)	Yano (10:59)
Nakanishi	Nakanishi (7:29)	Nakanishi (9:23)	Makabe (10:52)	Naito (10:52)	—N/a	Nakanishi (8:41)	Tanahashi (15:01)	Nakanishi (7:30)
Strong Man	Strong Man (6:30)	Devitt (7:36)	Makabe (5:57)	Strong Man (7:55)	Nakanishi (8:41)	—N/a	Tanahashi (6:50)	Yano (5:16)
Tanahashi	Anderson (11:42)	Devitt (11:35)	Tanahashi (11:58)	Draw (30:00)	Tanahashi (15:01)	Tanahashi (6:50)	—N/a	Tanahashi (14:49)
Yano	Anderson (9:16)	Yano (7:26)	Yano (7:18)	Yano (10:59)	Nakanishi (7:30)	Yano (5:16)	Tanahashi (14:49)	—N/a
Block B	Bernard	Goto	Inoue	Kojima	Nagata	Nakamura	Shiozaki	Takahashi
Bernard	—N/a	Bernard (11:25)	Bernard (9:19)	Kojima (11:44)	Bernard (13:05)	Nakamura (10:39)	Shiozaki (11:07)	Takahashi (8:03)
Goto	Bernard (11:25)	—N/a	Goto (10:14)	Kojima (12:09)	Goto (15:22)	Goto (16:51)	Shiozaki (17:52)	Goto (13:03)
Inoue	Bernard (9:19)	Goto (10:14)	—N/a	Kojima (13:56)	Nagata (10:18)	Nakamura (11:18)	Shiozaki (16:03)	Inoue (8:19)
Kojima	Kojima (11:44)	Kojima (12:09)	Kojima (13:56)	—N/a	Nagata (16:18)	Nakamura (16:45)	Kojima (15:13)	Kojima (8:20)
Nagata	Bernard (13:05)	Goto (15:22)	Nagata (10:18)	Nagata (16:18)	—N/a	Nagata (17:43)	Nagata (16:25)	Takahashi (5:28)
Nakamura	Nakamura (10:39)	Goto (16:51)	Nakamura (11:18)	Nakamura (16:45)	Nagata (17:43)	—N/a	Draw (30:00)	Nakamura (11:47)
Shiozaki	Shiozaki (11:07)	Shiozaki (17:52)	Shiozaki (16:03)	Kojima (15:13)	Nagata (16:25)	Draw (30:00)	—N/a	Shiozaki (10:36)
Takahashi	Takahashi (8:03)	Goto (13:03)	Inoue (8:19)	Kojima (8:20)	Takahashi (5:28)	Nakamura (11:47)	Shiozaki (10:36)	—N/a

Final
A1	Hiroshi Tanahashi	Pin
B1	Satoshi Kojima	21:25

=== 2011 ===
The 2011 version of the G1 Climax tournament was announced on May 3, 2011. It took place over ten shows between August 1 and August 14 and included 20 participants, making it at the time the largest G1 Climax in history.

Final standings
Block A		Block B	
Tetsuya Naito	12	Shinsuke Nakamura	14
Hiroshi Tanahashi	12	Satoshi Kojima	12
Yoshihiro Takayama	10	Minoru Suzuki	12
Togi Makabe	10	MVP	12
Giant Bernard	10	Hirooki Goto	12
Toru Yano	10	Karl Anderson	8
Yuji Nagata	10	Hiroyoshi Tenzan	8
Lance Archer	8	La Sombra	4
Yujiro Takahashi	6	Wataru Inoue	4
Hideo Saito	2	Strong Man	4

Block A	Archer	Bernard	Makabe	Nagata	Naito	Saito	Takahashi	Takayama	Tanahashi	Yano
Archer	—N/a	Bernard (11:23)	Archer (8:18)	Nagata (8:42)	Naito (12:38)	Archer (6:42)	Archer (7:14)	Archer (7:19)	Tanahashi (11:33)	Yano (8:51)
Bernard	Bernard (11:23)	—N/a	Makabe (12:35)	Bernard (10:00)	Naito (10:44)	Bernard (9:47)	Bernard (8:58)	Takayama (9:36)	Tanahashi (13:05)	Bernard (7:29)
Makabe	Archer (8:18)	Makabe (12:35)	—N/a	Makabe (13:13)	Makabe (14:27)	Makabe (5:23)	Takahashi (8:37)	Takayama (12:14)	Tanahashi (18:46)	Makabe (10:54)
Nagata	Nagata (8:42)	Bernard (10:00)	Makabe (13:13)	—N/a	Nagata (13:11)	Saito (4:29)	Nagata (9:49)	Nagata (13:51)	Nagata (18:19)	Yano (11:24)
Naito	Naito (12:38)	Naito (10:44)	Makabe (14:27)	Nagata (13:11)	—N/a	Naito (7:25)	Takahashi (10:52)	Naito (10:32)	Naito (5:11)	Naito (14:05)
Saito	Archer (6:42)	Bernard (9:47)	Makabe (5:23)	Saito (4:29)	Naito (7:25)	—N/a	Takahashi (9:25)	Takayama (3:29)	Tanahashi (8:01)	Yano (6:09)
Takahashi	Archer (7:14)	Bernard (8:58)	Takahashi (8:37)	Nagata (9:49)	Takahashi (10:52)	Takahashi (9:25)	—N/a	Takayama (9:25)	Tanahashi (12:43)	Yano (8:30)
Takayama	Archer (7:19)	Takayama (9:36)	Takayama (12:14)	Nagata (13:51)	Naito (10:32)	Takayama (3:29)	Takayama (9:25)	—N/a	Tanahashi (11:57)	Takayama (6:29)
Tanahashi	Tanahashi (11:33)	Tanahashi (13:05)	Tanahashi (18:46)	Nagata (18:19)	Naito (5:11)	Tanahashi (8:01)	Tanahashi (12:43)	Tanahashi (11:57)	—N/a	Yano (16:57)
Yano	Yano (8:51)	Bernard (7:29)	Makabe (10:54)	Yano (11:24)	Naito (14:05)	Yano (6:09)	Yano (8:30)	Takayama (6:29)	Yano (16:57)	—N/a
Block B	Anderson	Goto	Inoue	Kojima	MVP	Nakamura	Sombra	Strong Man	Suzuki	Tenzan
Anderson	—N/a	Goto (10:56)	Inoue (9:07)	Kojima (12:55)	Anderson (8:30)	Nakamura (12:11)	Anderson (7:49)	Anderson (7:55)	Suzuki (10:59)	Anderson (9:39)
Goto	Goto (10:56)	—N/a	Goto (11:09)	Goto (16:15)	MVP (10:39)	Goto (13:13)	Goto (9:06)	Strong Man (7:27)	Suzuki (12:38)	Goto (10:37)
Inoue	Inoue (9:07)	Goto (11:09)	—N/a	Kojima (9:51)	MVP (9:34)	Nakamura (12:29)	Sombra (8:41)	Inoue (7:00)	Suzuki (14:19)	Tenzan (9:50)
Kojima	Kojima (12:55)	Goto (16:15)	Kojima (9:51)	—N/a	Kojima (11:26)	Nakamura (15:05)	Kojima (9:25)	Kojima (8:15)	Kojima (12:40)	Tenzan (14:10)
MVP	Anderson (8:30)	MVP (10:39)	MVP (9:34)	Kojima (11:26)	—N/a	MVP (12:02)	MVP (4:59)	MVP (8:18)	Suzuki (12:03)	MVP (11:17)
Nakamura	Nakamura (12:11)	Goto (13:13)	Nakamura (12:29)	Nakamura (15:05)	MVP (12:02)	—N/a	Nakamura (10:49)	Nakamura (6:56)	Nakamura (12:13)	Nakamura (13:43)
Sombra	Anderson (7:49)	Goto (9:06)	Sombra (8:41)	Kojima (9:25)	MVP (4:59)	Nakamura (10:49)	—N/a	Sombra (6:48)	Suzuki (9:32)	Tenzan (9:16)
Strong Man	Anderson (7:55)	Strong Man (7:27)	Inoue (7:00)	Kojima (8:15)	MVP (8:18)	Nakamura (6:56)	Sombra (6:48)	—N/a	Strong Man (9:31)	Tenzan (7:18)
Suzuki	Suzuki (10:59)	Suzuki (12:38)	Suzuki (14:19)	Kojima (12:40)	Suzuki (12:03)	Nakamura (12:13)	Suzuki (9:32)	Strong Man (9:31)	—N/a	Suzuki (14:26)
Tenzan	Anderson (9:39)	Goto (10:37)	Tenzan (9:50)	Tenzan (14:10)	MVP (11:17)	Nakamura (13:43)	Tenzan (9:16)	Tenzan (7:18)	Suzuki (14:26)	—N/a

Final
A1	Tetsuya Naito	Pin
B1	Shinsuke Nakamura	20:19

=== 2012 ===
The 2012 version of the G1 Climax tournament took place over nine shows between August 1 and August 12 and included 18 participants. The 24-year-old Kazuchika Okada went on to become the youngest G1 Climax winner in history, breaking the previous record held by the then 27-year-old Masahiro Chono. Okada also became the first winner since Hirooki Goto to win the tournament in his first attempt. Karl Anderson became the first foreigner to make it to the final of the tournament since Rick Rude in 1992.

Final standings
Block A		Block B	
Karl Anderson	10	Kazuchika Okada	10
Hiroshi Tanahashi	10	Lance Archer	8
Yuji Nagata	8	Hirooki Goto	8
Shelton Benjamin	8	Togi Makabe	8
Satoshi Kojima	8	MVP	8
Minoru Suzuki	8	Tetsuya Naito	8
Naomichi Marufuji	8	Hiroyoshi Tenzan	8
Toru Yano	6	Shinsuke Nakamura	8
Yujiro Takahashi	6	Rush	6

Block A	Anderson	Benjamin	Kojima	Marufuji	Nagata	Suzuki	Takahashi	Tanahashi	Yano
Anderson	—N/a	Anderson (9:15)	Kojima (12:47)	Marufuji (9:14)	Anderson (11:28)	Anderson (12:22)	Takahashi (10:16)	Anderson (11:15)	Anderson (9:14)
Benjamin	Anderson (9:15)	—N/a	Benjamin (9:04)	Benjamin (7:54)	Nagata (9:52)	Suzuki (10:45)	Benjamin (7:40)	Tanahashi (13:54)	Benjamin (8:11)
Kojima	Kojima (12:47)	Benjamin (9:04)	—N/a	Marufuji (11:37)	Kojima (13:52)	Kojima (13:33)	Takahashi (8:34)	Tanahashi (17:41)	Kojima (9:03)
Marufuji	Marufuji (9:14)	Benjamin (7:54)	Marufuji (11:37)	—N/a	Nagata (13:04)	Suzuki (14:49)	Marufuji (8:34)	Marufuji (21:29)	Yano (9:55)
Nagata	Anderson (11:28)	Nagata (9:52)	Kojima (13:52)	Nagata (13:04)	—N/a	Nagata (9:03)	Takahashi (9:31)	Tanahashi (17:24)	Nagata (10:01)
Suzuki	Anderson (12:22)	Suzuki (10:45)	Kojima (13:33)	Suzuki (14:49)	Nagata (9:03)	—N/a	Suzuki (8:05)	Suzuki (20:53)	Yano (8:05)
Takahashi	Takahashi (10:16)	Benjamin (7:40)	Takahashi (8:34)	Marufuji (8:34)	Takahashi (9:31)	Suzuki (8:05)	—N/a	Tanahashi (14:23)	Yano (7:34)
Tanahashi	Anderson (11:15)	Tanahashi (13:54)	Tanahashi (17:41)	Marufuji (21:29)	Tanahashi (17:24)	Suzuki (20:53)	Tanahashi (14:23)	—N/a	Tanahashi (14:18)
Yano	Anderson (9:14)	Benjamin (8:11)	Kojima (9:03)	Yano (9:55)	Nagata (10:01)	Yano (8:05)	Yano (7:34)	Tanahashi (14:18)	—N/a
Block B	Archer	Goto	Makabe	MVP	Naito	Nakamura	Okada	Rush	Tenzan
Archer	—N/a	Archer (9:41)	Archer (9:55)	MVP (10:50)	Archer (10:41)	Nakamura (12:11)	Okada (10:46)	Rush (7:30)	Archer (10:57)
Goto	Archer (9:41)	—N/a	Makabe (13:31)	Goto (9:19)	Goto (11:05)	Goto (13:31)	Goto (18:36)	Rush (8:02)	Tenzan (13:39)
Makabe	Archer (9:55)	Makabe (13:31)	—N/a	MVP (9:30)	Makabe (14:10)	Makabe (14:12)	Okada (9:33)	Makabe (7:17)	Tenzan (11:58)
MVP	MVP (10:50)	Goto (9:19)	MVP (9:30)	—N/a	Naito (9:33)	Nakamura (12:14)	Okada (10:44)	MVP (7:53)	MVP (9:35)
Naito	Archer (10:41)	Goto (11:05)	Makabe (14:10)	Naito (9:33)	—N/a	Naito (13:39)	Naito (21:59)	Rush (9:39)	Naito (13:27)
Nakamura	Nakamura (12:11)	Goto (13:31)	Makabe (14:12)	Nakamura (12:14)	Naito (13:39)	—N/a	Nakamura (16:16)	Nakamura (10:07)	Tenzan (12:48)
Okada	Okada (10:46)	Goto (18:36)	Okada (9:33)	Okada (10:44)	Naito (21:59)	Nakamura (16:16)	—N/a	Okada (9:20)	Okada (11:20)
Rush	Rush (7:30)	Rush (8:02)	Makabe (7:17)	MVP (7:53)	Rush (9:39)	Nakamura (10:07)	Okada (9:20)	—N/a	Tenzan (9:30)
Tenzan	Archer (10:57)	Tenzan (13:39)	Tenzan (11:58)	MVP (9:35)	Naito (13:27)	Tenzan (12:48)	Okada (11:20)	Tenzan (9:30)	—N/a

Final
A1	Karl Anderson	Pin
B1	Kazuchika Okada	23:19

=== 2013 ===
The 2013 version of the G1 Climax tournament took place over nine shows between August 1 and August 11 and included 20 participants. In an unprecedented move, NJPW broadcast all nine events live on internet pay-per-view (iPPV) through Niconico and Ustream. On August 8, NJPW announced that Hirooki Goto and Hiroyoshi Tenzan had suffered jaw and rib fractures respectively and would both miss the rest of the tournament.

Final standings
Block A		Block B	
Hiroshi Tanahashi	11	Tetsuya Naito	10
Katsuyori Shibata	10	Minoru Suzuki	10
Davey Boy Smith, Jr.	10	Karl Anderson	10
Prince Devitt	10	Shelton X Benjamin	10
Togi Makabe	10	Shinsuke Nakamura	10
Kazuchika Okada	9	Yuji Nagata	10
Hirooki Goto	8	Kota Ibushi	8
Lance Archer	8	Toru Yano	8
Satoshi Kojima	8	Yujiro Takahashi	8
Tomohiro Ishii	6	Hiroyoshi Tenzan	6

Block A	Archer	Devitt	Goto	Ishii	Kojima	Makabe	Okada	Shibata	Smith	Tanahashi
Archer	—N/a	Archer (8:14)	Goto (8:35)	Archer (10:43)	Archer (12:38)	Makabe (9:07)	Okada (11:26)	Shibata (6:41)	Archer (14:37)	Tanahashi (10:56)
Devitt	Archer (8:14)	—N/a	Goto (8:04)	Devitt (10:28)	Devitt (9:02)	Devitt (8:43)	Devitt (12:56)	Shibata (6:56)	Smith (7:26)	Devitt (11:07)
Goto	Goto (8:35)	Goto (8:04)	—N/a	Ishii (Forfeit)	Goto (13:07)	Makabe (11:20)	Goto (12:43)	Shibata (Forfeit)	Smith (Forfeit)	Tanahashi (15:30)
Ishii	Archer (10:43)	Devitt (10:28)	Ishii (Forfeit)	—N/a	Kojima (11:20)	Makabe (14:00)	Okada (11:21)	Ishii (12:17)	Smith (11:17)	Ishii (17:42)
Kojima	Archer (12:38)	Devitt (9:02)	Goto (13:07)	Kojima (11:20)	—N/a	Makabe (15:40)	Kojima (11:56)	Kojima (9:40)	Smith (11:43)	Kojima (16:07)
Makabe	Makabe (9:07)	Devitt (8:43)	Makabe (11:20)	Makabe (14:00)	Makabe (15:40)	—N/a	Makabe (13:55)	Shibata (7:23)	Smith (10:13)	Tanahashi (13:37)
Okada	Okada (11:26)	Devitt (12:56)	Goto (12:43)	Okada (11:21)	Kojima (11:56)	Makabe (13:55)	—N/a	Okada (9:13)	Okada (13:33)	Draw (30:00)
Shibata	Shibata (6:41)	Shibata (6:56)	Shibata (Forfeit)	Ishii (12:17)	Kojima (9:40)	Shibata (7:23)	Okada (9:13)	—N/a	Shibata (9:06)	Tanahashi (10:56)
Smith	Archer (14:37)	Smith (7:26)	Smith (Forfeit)	Smith (11:17)	Smith (11:43)	Smith (10:13)	Okada (13:33)	Shibata (9:06)	—N/a	Tanahashi (14:35)
Tanahashi	Tanahashi (10:56)	Devitt (11:07)	Tanahashi (15:30)	Ishii (17:42)	Kojima (16:07)	Tanahashi (13:37)	Draw (30:00)	Tanahashi (10:56)	Tanahashi (14:35)	—N/a
Block B	Anderson	Benjamin	Ibushi	Nagata	Naito	Nakamura	Suzuki	Takahashi	Tenzan	Yano
Anderson	—N/a	Anderson (6:28)	Ibushi (9:52)	Anderson (10:09)	Naito (13:11)	Anderson (12:54)	Suzuki (10:40)	Anderson (7:00)	Anderson (9:55)	Yano (7:24)
Benjamin	Anderson (6:28)	—N/a	Benjamin (10:20)	Benjamin (8:17)	Naito (8:36)	Benjamin (10:34)	Suzuki (8:42)	Takahashi (7:58)	Benjamin (8:20)	Benjamin (7:35)
Ibushi	Ibushi (9:52)	Benjamin (10:20)	—N/a	Nagata (13:49)	Ibushi (13:16)	Nakamura (19:18)	Suzuki (13:37)	Takahashi (8:45)	Ibushi (Forfeit)	Ibushi (7:32)
Nagata	Anderson (10:09)	Benjamin (8:17)	Nagata (13:49)	—N/a	Naito (11:40)	Nakamura (13:55)	Nagata (14:34)	Nagata (9:06)	Nagata (Forfeit)	Nagata (6:46)
Naito	Naito (13:11)	Naito (8:36)	Ibushi (13:16)	Naito (11:40)	—N/a	Naito (14:50)	Naito (16:19)	Takahashi (9:30)	Tenzan (12:20)	Yano (9:26)
Nakamura	Anderson (12:54)	Benjamin (10:34)	Nakamura (19:18)	Nakamura (13:55)	Naito (14:50)	—N/a	Suzuki (13:44)	Nakamura (10:47)	Nakamura (Forfeit)	Nakamura (11:36)
Suzuki	Suzuki (10:40)	Suzuki (8:42)	Suzuki (13:37)	Nagata (14:34)	Naito (16:19)	Suzuki (13:44)	—N/a	Suzuki (10:31)	Tenzan (11:46)	Yano (9:23)
Takahashi	Anderson (7:00)	Takahashi (7:58)	Takahashi (8:45)	Nagata (9:06)	Takahashi (9:30)	Nakamura (10:47)	Suzuki (10:31)	—N/a	Takahashi (9:07)	Yano (7:04)
Tenzan	Anderson (9:55)	Benjamin (8:20)	Ibushi (Forfeit)	Nagata (Forfeit)	Tenzan (12:20)	Nakamura (Forfeit)	Tenzan (11:46)	Takahashi (9:07)	—N/a	Tenzan (8:39)
Yano	Yano (7:24)	Benjamin (7:35)	Ibushi (7:32)	Nagata (6:46)	Yano (9:26)	Nakamura (11:36)	Yano (9:23)	Yano (7:04)	Tenzan (8:39)	—N/a

Final
A1	Hiroshi Tanahashi	Pin
B1	Tetsuya Naito	26:44

=== 2014 ===
The 2014 version of the G1 Climax tournament took place between July 21 and August 10 with the final taking place in Tokorozawa, Saitama at the Seibu Dome for the first time departing Ryōgoku Kokugikan, which housed the final from every year since the tournament began. With 22 participants, the tournament marked the largest G1 Climax in history. Like the previous year, all events in the tournament were made available on iPPV through Niconico and Ustream. Kota Ibushi was scheduled to take part in the tournament, but on July 18 NJPW announced that he would have to pull out due to a concussion suffered at the beginning of the month. The following day, Tomoaki Honma was named Ibushi's replacement in the tournament.

Final standings
Block A		Block B	
Shinsuke Nakamura	16	Kazuchika Okada	16
Hiroshi Tanahashi	14	A.J. Styles	16
Bad Luck Fale	12	Karl Anderson	10
Katsuyori Shibata	12	Minoru Suzuki	10
Shelton X Benjamin	10	Tetsuya Naito	10
Tomohiro Ishii	10	Lance Archer	8
Davey Boy Smith, Jr.	10	Yujiro Takahashi	8
Satoshi Kojima	10	Hiroyoshi Tenzan	8
Doc Gallows	8	Toru Yano	8
Yuji Nagata	8	Hirooki Goto	8
Tomoaki Honma	0	Togi Makabe	8

Block A	Fale	Benjamin	Gallows	Honma	Ishii	Kojima	Nagata	Nakamura	Shibata	Smith	Tanahashi
Fale	—N/a	Benjamin (5:55)	Gallows (8:04)	Fale (6:40)	Fale (9:39)	Kojima (8:25)	Fale (10:57)	Nakamura (11:08)	Fale (7:14)	Fale (7:10)	Fale (12:27)
Benjamin	Benjamin (5:55)	—N/a	Benjamin (8:54)	Benjamin (8:08)	Benjamin (8:11)	Kojima (10:11)	Nagata (10:52)	Nakamura (9:01)	Shibata (14:01)	Benjamin (8:44)	Tanahashi (12:32)
Gallows	Gallows (8:04)	Benjamin (8:54)	—N/a	Gallows (7:37)	Ishii (8:11)	Kojima (7:11)	Gallows (7:53)	Nakamura (11:35)	Gallows (6:30)	Smith (10:08)	Tanahashi (11:14)
Honma	Fale (6:40)	Benjamin (8:08)	Gallows (7:37)	—N/a	Ishii (12:06)	Kojima (6:55)	Nagata (11:15)	Nakamura (10:19)	Shibata (10:47)	Smith (8:53)	Tanahashi (11:01)
Ishii	Fale (9:39)	Benjamin (8:11)	Ishii (8:11)	Ishii (12:06)	—N/a	Ishii (12:27)	Ishii (11:46)	Nakamura (15:14)	Shibata (12:24)	Ishii (10:24)	Tanahashi (15:02)
Kojima	Kojima (8:25)	Kojima (10:11)	Kojima (7:11)	Kojima (6:55)	Ishii (12:27)	—N/a	Kojima (11:27)	Nakamura (12:51)	Shibata (10:11)	Smith (11:30)	Tanahashi (13:01)
Nagata	Fale (10:57)	Nagata (10:52)	Gallows (7:53)	Nagata (11:15)	Ishii (11:46)	Kojima (11:27)	—N/a	Nakamura (16:11)	Nagata (13:31)	Nagata (9:39)	Tanahashi (12:34)
Nakamura	Nakamura (11:08)	Nakamura (9:01)	Nakamura (11:35)	Nakamura (10:19)	Nakamura (15:14)	Nakamura (12:51)	Nakamura (16:11)	—N/a	Shibata (15:27)	Nakamura (13:37)	Tanahashi (17:00)
Shibata	Fale (7:14)	Shibata (14:01)	Gallows (6:30)	Shibata (10:47)	Shibata (12:24)	Shibata (10:11)	Nagata (13:31)	Shibata (15:27)	—N/a	Smith (9:42)	Shibata (16:16)
Smith	Fale (7:10)	Benjamin (8:44)	Smith (10:08)	Smith (8:53)	Ishii (10:24)	Smith (11:30)	Nagata (9:39)	Nakamura (13:37)	Smith (9:42)	—N/a	Smith (12:57)
Tanahashi	Fale (12:27)	Tanahashi (12:32)	Tanahashi (11:14)	Tanahashi (11:01)	Tanahashi (15:02)	Tanahashi (13:01)	Tanahashi (12:34)	Tanahashi (17:00)	Shibata (16:16)	Smith (12:57)	—N/a
Block B	Anderson	Archer	Goto	Makabe	Naito	Okada	Styles	Suzuki	Takahashi	Tenzan	Yano
Anderson	—N/a	Archer (7:35)	Anderson (11:36)	Makabe (8:44)	Anderson (7:51)	Anderson (12:34)	Styles (14:33)	Anderson (8:35)	Anderson (7:45)	Tenzan (10:11)	Yano (5:46)
Archer	Archer (7:35)	—N/a	Archer (8:52)	Makabe (10:35)	Naito (8:39)	Okada (11:05)	Styles (12:52)	Suzuki (9:17)	Takahashi (9:00)	Archer (10:44)	Archer (4:38)
Goto	Anderson (11:36)	Archer (8:52)	—N/a	Goto (11:37)	Goto (12:21)	Okada (15:34)	Styles (14:58)	Goto (7:03)	Goto (10:31)	Tenzan (11:46)	Yano (1:21)
Makabe	Makabe (8:44)	Makabe (10:35)	Goto (11:37)	—N/a	Makabe (12:02)	Okada (14:49)	Styles (11:33)	Suzuki (12:21)	Takahashi (8:16)	Makabe (8:22)	Yano (2:48)
Naito	Anderson (7:51)	Naito (8:39)	Goto (12:21)	Makabe (12:02)	—N/a	Naito (13:54)	Naito (15:55)	Suzuki (12:16)	Takahashi (13:54)	Naito (10:23)	Naito (9:11)
Okada	Anderson (12:34)	Okada (11:05)	Okada (15:34)	Okada (14:49)	Naito (13:54)	—N/a	Okada (18:03)	Okada (17:14)	Okada (12:49)	Okada (12:51)	Okada (9:01)
Styles	Styles (14:33)	Styles (12:52)	Styles (14:58)	Styles (11:33)	Naito (15:55)	Okada (18:03)	—N/a	Styles (16:20)	Styles (8:36)	Styles (14:22)	Styles (9:53)
Suzuki	Anderson (8:35)	Suzuki (9:17)	Goto (7:03)	Suzuki (12:21)	Suzuki (12:16)	Okada (17:14)	Styles (16:20)	—N/a	Suzuki (8:39)	Suzuki (11:04)	Yano (2:15)
Takahashi	Anderson (7:45)	Takahashi (9:00)	Goto (10:31)	Takahashi (8:16)	Takahashi (13:54)	Okada (12:49)	Styles (8:36)	Suzuki (8:39)	—N/a	Tenzan (11:16)	Takahashi (2:56)
Tenzan	Tenzan (10:11)	Archer (10:44)	Tenzan (11:46)	Makabe (8:22)	Naito (10:23)	Okada (12:51)	Styles (14:22)	Suzuki (11:04)	Tenzan (11:16)	—N/a	Tenzan (4:33)
Yano	Yano (5:46)	Archer (4:38)	Yano (1:21)	Yano (2:48)	Naito (9:11)	Okada (9:01)	Styles (9:53)	Yano (2:15)	Takahashi (2:56)	Tenzan (4:33)	—N/a

Final
A1	Shinsuke Nakamura	Pin
B1	Kazuchika Okada	23:18

=== 2015 ===
The 2015 version of the G1 Climax tournament took place between July 20 and August 16. Taking place over 19 shows, it was the longest G1 Climax in history. The final three days took place back at Ryōgoku Kokugikan. Participants in the tournament were announced on June 7. For the tournament, NJPW introduced a new format, where each show would only include five tournament matches all from the same block, giving the other participants more time to rest. Shinsuke Nakamura injured his left elbow in his second match, forcing him to forfeit his third match against Michael Elgin.

Final standings
Block A		Block B	
Hiroshi Tanahashi	14	Shinsuke Nakamura	14
A.J. Styles	12	Kazuchika Okada	14
Tetsuya Naito	10	Karl Anderson	12
Bad Luck Fale	10	Hirooki Goto	12
Toru Yano	8	Tomohiro Ishii	10
Katsuyori Shibata	8	Michael Elgin	8
Kota Ibushi	8	Yujiro Takahashi	6
Togi Makabe	8	Yuji Nagata	6
Hiroyoshi Tenzan	6	Satoshi Kojima	6
Doc Gallows	6	Tomoaki Honma	2

Block A	Fale	Gallows	Ibushi	Makabe	Naito	Shibata	Styles	Tanahashi	Tenzan	Yano
Fale	—N/a	Fale (8:43)	Fale (8:30)	Fale (8:06)	Naito (10:41)	Shibata (7:51)	Styles (9:53)	Fale (13:07)	Fale (9:51)	Yano (3:44)
Gallows	Fale (8:43)	—N/a	Ibushi (8:35)	Makabe (8:55)	Gallows (8:22)	Gallows (7:52)	Styles (10:14)	Tanahashi (11:37)	Tenzan (9:17)	Gallows (6:58)
Ibushi	Fale (8:30)	Ibushi (8:35)	—N/a	Ibushi (9:07)	Naito (17:18)	Shibata (13:25)	Ibushi (19:10)	Tanahashi (20:53)	Ibushi (11:14)	Yano (0:50)
Makabe	Fale (8:06)	Makabe (8:55)	Ibushi (9:07)	—N/a	Makabe (15:45)	Shibata (9:35)	Styles (11:17)	Tanahashi (16:15)	Makabe (8:41)	Makabe (6:26)
Naito	Naito (10:41)	Gallows (8:22)	Naito (17:18)	Makabe (15:45)	—N/a	Shibata (12:11)	Naito (17:13)	Naito (24:14)	Tenzan (14:14)	Naito (8:01)
Shibata	Shibata (7:51)	Gallows (7:52)	Shibata (13:25)	Shibata (9:35)	Shibata (12:11)	—N/a	Styles (13:36)	Tanahashi (21:20)	Tenzan (9:49)	Yano (4:01)
Styles	Styles (9:53)	Styles (10:14)	Ibushi (19:10)	Styles (11:17)	Naito (17:13)	Styles (13:36)	—N/a	Tanahashi (27:56)	Styles (13:29)	Styles (10:13)
Tanahashi	Fale (13:07)	Tanahashi (11:37)	Tanahashi (20:53)	Tanahashi (16:15)	Naito (24:14)	Tanahashi (21:20)	Tanahashi (27:56)	—N/a	Tanahashi (15:11)	Tanahashi (14:59)
Tenzan	Fale (9:51)	Tenzan (9:17)	Ibushi (11:14)	Makabe (8:41)	Tenzan (14:14)	Tenzan (9:49)	Styles (13:29)	Tanahashi (15:11)	—N/a	Yano (6:38)
Yano	Yano (3:44)	Gallows (6:58)	Yano (0:50)	Makabe (6:26)	Naito (8:01)	Yano (4:01)	Styles (10:13)	Tanahashi (14:59)	Yano (6:38)	—N/a
Block B	Anderson	Elgin	Goto	Honma	Ishii	Kojima	Nagata	Nakamura	Okada	Takahashi
Anderson	—N/a	Anderson (12:56)	Anderson (11:34)	Anderson (11:37)	Ishii (16:31)	Kojima (10:53)	Anderson (11:15)	Anderson (17:41)	Okada (14:34)	Anderson (10:04)
Elgin	Anderson (12:56)	—N/a	Goto (11:41)	Elgin (9:55)	Ishii (14:30)	Kojima (12:49)	Elgin (11:02)	Elgin (forfeit)	Okada (11:48)	Elgin (11:58)
Goto	Anderson (11:34)	Goto (11:41)	—N/a	Goto (12:20)	Goto (17:11)	Goto (12:39)	Nagata (13:00)	Nakamura (16:32)	Goto (16:45)	Goto (11:48)
Honma	Anderson (11:37)	Elgin (9:55)	Goto (12:20)	—N/a	Honma (16:13)	Kojima (10:15)	Nagata (12:49)	Nakamura (11:50)	Okada (17:51)	Takahashi (10:33)
Ishii	Ishii (16:31)	Ishii (14:30)	Goto (17:11)	Honma (16:13)	—N/a	Ishii (12:20)	Ishii (16:19)	Nakamura (14:47)	Okada (17:07)	Ishii (12:17)
Kojima	Kojima (10:53)	Kojima (12:49)	Goto (12:39)	Kojima (10:15)	Ishii (12:20)	—N/a	Nagata (10:50)	Nakamura (11:24)	Okada (18:22)	Takahashi (13:01)
Nagata	Anderson (11:15)	Elgin (11:02)	Nagata (13:00)	Nagata (12:49)	Ishii (16:19)	Nagata (10:50)	—N/a	Nakamura (16:26)	Okada (18:14)	Takahashi (12:03)
Nakamura	Anderson (17:41)	Elgin (forfeit)	Nakamura (16:32)	Nakamura (11:50)	Nakamura (14:47)	Nakamura (11:24)	Nakamura (16:26)	—N/a	Nakamura (23:31)	Nakamura (10:36)
Okada	Okada (14:34)	Okada (11:48)	Goto (16:45)	Okada (17:51)	Okada (17:07)	Okada (18:22)	Okada (18:14)	Nakamura (23:31)	—N/a	Okada (14:21)
Takahashi	Anderson (10:04)	Elgin (11:58)	Goto (11:48)	Takahashi (10:33)	Ishii (12:17)	Takahashi (13:01)	Takahashi (12:03)	Nakamura (10:36)	Okada (14:21)	—N/a

Final
A1	Hiroshi Tanahashi	Pin
B1	Shinsuke Nakamura	32:15

=== 2016 ===
The 2016 version of the G1 Climax tournament took place between July 18 and August 14. On June 27, NJPW announced the participants, which included two outsiders; Pro Wrestling Noah's Katsuhiko Nakajima and Naomichi Marufuji. Originally, former three-time G1 Climax winner and the wrestler with the most G1 Climax appearances, Hiroyoshi Tenzan, was left out of the tournament. However, on July 3, Tenzan's longtime tag team partner Satoshi Kojima gave him his spot in the tournament. Afterwards, Tenzan confirmed this would be his last G1 Climax. In the final, Canadian Kenny Omega made history, becoming the first non-Japanese winner of the tournament under its G1 Climax name as well as the first man in four years to win the tournament in his first attempt.

Final standings
Block A		Block B	
Hirooki Goto	12	Kenny Omega	12
Kazuchika Okada	11	Tetsuya Naito	12
Hiroshi Tanahashi	11	Katsuhiko Nakajima	10
Bad Luck Fale	10	Toru Yano	10
Naomichi Marufuji	10	Michael Elgin	10
Togi Makabe	8	Katsuyori Shibata	10
Tama Tonga	8	Evil	8
Sanada	8	Tomoaki Honma	6
Tomohiro Ishii	8	Yuji Nagata	6
Hiroyoshi Tenzan	4	Yoshi-Hashi	6

Block A	Fale	Goto	Ishii	Makabe	Marufuji	Okada	Sanada	Tanahashi	Tenzan	Tonga
Fale	—N/a	Goto (9:18)	Ishii (9:35)	Fale (8:38)	Fale (9:36)	Fale (11:16)	Fale (9:06)	Tanahashi (15:05)	Fale (8:22)	Tonga (8:39)
Goto	Goto (9:18)	—N/a	Goto (11:49)	Goto (14:12)	Goto (13:17)	Okada (16:11)	Sanada (12:05)	Tanahashi (17:47)	Goto (10:02)	Goto (12:29)
Ishii	Ishii (9:35)	Goto (11:49)	—N/a	Ishii (12:33)	Ishii (12:14)	Ishii (18:43)	Sanada (12:18)	Tanahashi (16:10)	Tenzan (14:08)	Tonga (11:00)
Makabe	Fale (8:38)	Goto (14:12)	Ishii (12:33)	—N/a	Marufuji (10:39)	Okada (15:04)	Makabe (12:25)	Makabe (14:04)	Makabe (10:08)	Makabe (10:37)
Marufuji	Fale (9:36)	Goto (13:17)	Ishii (12:14)	Marufuji (10:39)	—N/a	Marufuji (19:07)	Marufuji (10:39)	Tanahashi (19:00)	Marufuji (12:29)	Marufuji (10:54)
Okada	Fale (11:16)	Okada (16:11)	Ishii (18:43)	Okada (15:04)	Marufuji (19:07)	—N/a	Okada (13:20)	Draw (30:00)	Okada (12:30)	Okada (11:45)
Sanada	Fale (9:06)	Sanada (12:05)	Sanada (12:18)	Makabe (12:25)	Marufuji (10:39)	Okada (13:20)	—N/a	Sanada (19:30)	Sanada (12:12)	Tonga (10:40)
Tanahashi	Tanahashi (15:05)	Tanahashi (17:47)	Tanahashi (16:10)	Makabe (14:04)	Tanahashi (19:00)	Draw (30:00)	Sanada (19:30)	—N/a	Tanahashi (11:17)	Tonga (11:10)
Tenzan	Fale (8:22)	Goto (10:02)	Tenzan (14:08)	Makabe (10:08)	Marufuji (12:29)	Okada (12:30)	Sanada (12:12)	Tanahashi (11:17)	—N/a	Tenzan (10:31)
Tonga	Tonga (8:39)	Goto (12:29)	Tonga (11:00)	Makabe (10:37)	Marufuji (10:54)	Okada (11:45)	Tonga (10:40)	Tonga (11:10)	Tenzan (10:31)	—N/a
Block B	Elgin	Evil	Honma	Nagata	Naito	Nakajima	Omega	Shibata	Yano	Yoshi-Hashi
Elgin	—N/a	Evil (10:54)	Elgin (18:43)	Elgin (10:35)	Naito (22:12)	Nakajima (16:50)	Elgin (16:44)	Elgin (15:53)	Yano (4:59)	Elgin (9:49)
Evil	Evil (10:54)	—N/a	Evil (9:49)	Nagata (10:54)	Naito (21:28)	Nakajima (10:31)	Omega (10:15)	Evil (9:42)	Evil (2:57)	Yoshi-Hashi (12:48)
Honma	Elgin (18:43)	Evil (9:49)	—N/a	Honma (10:29)	Naito (20:38)	Nakajima (12:32)	Omega (13:59)	Honma (11:11)	Yano (4:21)	Honma (13:07)
Nagata	Elgin (10:35)	Nagata (10:54)	Honma (10:29)	—N/a	Nagata (15:32)	Nakajima (12:32)	Omega (14:17)	Shibata (12:16)	Yano (4:22)	Nagata (11:56)
Naito	Naito (22:12)	Naito (21:28)	Naito (20:38)	Nagata (15:32)	—N/a	Naito (19:08)	Omega (28:12)	Shibata (19:24)	Naito (4:54)	Naito (15:01)
Nakajima	Nakajima (16:50)	Nakajima (10:31)	Nakajima (12:32)	Nakajima (12:32)	Naito (19:08)	—N/a	Omega (10:29)	Shibata (14:08)	Nakajima (3:51)	Yoshi-Hashi (12:02)
Omega	Elgin (16:44)	Omega (10:15)	Omega (13:59)	Omega (14:17)	Omega (28:12)	Omega (10:29)	—N/a	Shibata (12:28)	Omega (9:05)	Yoshi-Hashi (12:16)
Shibata	Elgin (15:53)	Evil (9:42)	Honma (11:11)	Shibata (12:16)	Shibata (19:24)	Shibata (14:08)	Shibata (12:28)	—N/a	Yano (1:05)	Shibata (11:08)
Yano	Yano (4:59)	Evil (2:57)	Yano (4:21)	Yano (4:22)	Naito (4:54)	Nakajima (3:51)	Omega (9:05)	Yano (1:05)	—N/a	Yano (3:31)
Yoshi-Hashi	Elgin (9:49)	Yoshi-Hashi (12:48)	Honma (13:07)	Nagata (11:56)	Naito (15:01)	Yoshi-Hashi (12:02)	Yoshi-Hashi (12:16)	Shibata (11:08)	Yano (3:31)	—N/a

Final
A1	Hirooki Goto	26:49
B1	Kenny Omega	Pin

=== 2017 ===
The 2017 version of the G1 Climax tournament took place between July 17 and August 13. Prior to the tournament, NJPW held two "G1 Special" shows in Long Beach, California on July 1 and 2. On June 20, NJPW announced the participants in the tournament, which included one outsider: freelancer Kota Ibushi, competing in his third G1. Juice Robinson and Zack Sabre Jr. took part in their first G1 Climax tournament, while Yuji Nagata took part in his 19th and final tournament. The final match between Kenny Omega and Tetsuya Naito became the longest match in G1 Climax history, breaking the previous record from 2015.

Final standings
Block A		Block B	
Tetsuya Naito	14	Kenny Omega	14
Hiroshi Tanahashi	12	Kazuchika Okada	13
Bad Luck Fale	12	Evil	12
Hirooki Goto	10	Minoru Suzuki	9
Kota Ibushi	10	Tama Tonga	8
Zack Sabre Jr.	10	Sanada	8
Tomohiro Ishii	8	Juice Robinson	8
Togi Makabe	8	Toru Yano	8
Yoshi-Hashi	4	Michael Elgin	8
Yuji Nagata	2	Satoshi Kojima	2

Block A	Fale	Goto	Ibushi	Ishii	Makabe	Nagata	Naito	Sabre	Tanahashi	Yoshi-Hashi
Fale	—N/a	Fale (9:34)	Fale (11:37)	Fale (11:58)	Fale (9:25)	Fale (11:56)	Fale (11:55)	Sabre (9:02)	Tanahashi (11:05)	Yoshi-Hashi (10:21)
Goto	Fale (9:34)	—N/a	Goto (11:03)	Goto (13:43)	Makabe (16:55)	Goto (15:02)	Naito (13:30)	Goto (10:10)	Tanahashi (17:22)	Goto (11:26)
Ibushi	Fale (11:37)	Goto (11:03)	—N/a	Ibushi (17:14)	Makabe (13:20)	Ibushi (15:54)	Naito (24:41)	Ibushi (15:51)	Ibushi (20:40)	Ibushi (14:28)
Ishii	Fale (11:58)	Goto (13:43)	Ibushi (17:14)	—N/a	Ishii (15:51)	Ishii (13:51)	Ishii (20:58)	Sabre (15:22)	Tanahashi (23:30)	Ishii (15:43)
Makabe	Fale (9:25)	Makabe (16:55)	Makabe (13:20)	Ishii (15:51)	—N/a	Makabe (10:45)	Naito (11:31)	Sabre (9:30)	Tanahashi (13:34)	Makabe (11:28)
Nagata	Fale (11:56)	Goto (15:02)	Ibushi (15:54)	Ishii (13:51)	Makabe (10:45)	—N/a	Naito (15:16)	Nagata (15:08)	Tanahashi (14:47)	Yoshi-Hashi (16:29)
Naito	Fale (11:55)	Naito (13:30)	Naito (24:41)	Ishii (20:58)	Naito (11:31)	Naito (15:16)	—N/a	Naito (14:20)	Naito (26:41)	Naito (22:19)
Sabre	Sabre (9:02)	Goto (10:10)	Ibushi (15:51)	Sabre (15:22)	Sabre (9:30)	Nagata (15:08)	Naito (14:20)	—N/a	Sabre (17:18)	Sabre (11:48)
Tanahashi	Tanahashi (11:05)	Tanahashi (17:22)	Ibushi (20:40)	Tanahashi (23:30)	Tanahashi (13:34)	Tanahashi (14:47)	Naito (26:41)	Sabre (17:18)	—N/a	Tanahashi (13:34)
Yoshi-Hashi	Yoshi-Hashi (10:21)	Goto (11:26)	Ibushi (14:28)	Ishii (15:43)	Makabe (11:28)	Yoshi-Hashi (16:29)	Naito (22:19)	Sabre (11:48)	Tanahashi (13:34)	—N/a
Block B	Elgin	Evil	Kojima	Okada	Omega	Robinson	Sanada	Suzuki	Tonga	Yano
Elgin	—N/a	Elgin (11:07)	Elgin (13:09)	Okada (25:49)	Elgin (24:39)	Robinson (11:48)	Sanada (15:06)	Elgin (11:13)	Tonga (13:46)	Yano (2:58)
Evil	Elgin (11:07)	—N/a	Evil (14:23)	Evil (22:47)	Omega (23:33)	Evil (11:46)	Sanada (15:48)	Evil (8:38)	Evil (10:27)	Evil (1:33)
Kojima	Elgin (13:09)	Evil (14:23)	—N/a	Okada (15:26)	Omega (12:42)	Robinson (11:48)	Kojima (12:09)	Suzuki (10:13)	Tonga (10:43)	Yano (9:12)
Okada	Okada (25:49)	Evil (22:47)	Okada (15:26)	—N/a	Omega (24:40)	Okada (20:29)	Okada (20:49)	Draw (30:00)	Okada (11:22)	Okada (10:31)
Omega	Elgin (24:39)	Omega (23:33)	Omega (12:42)	Omega (24:40)	—N/a	Robinson (15:36)	Omega (15:03)	Omega (21:24)	Omega (11:41)	Omega (11:31)
Robinson	Robinson (11:48)	Evil (11:46)	Robinson (11:48)	Okada (20:29)	Robinson (15:36)	—N/a	Sanada (13:48)	Suzuki (11:23)	Tonga (10:36)	Robinson (4:25)
Sanada	Sanada (15:06)	Sanada (15:48)	Kojima (12:09)	Okada (20:49)	Omega (15:03)	Sanada (13:48)	—N/a	Suzuki (11:22)	Tonga (11:59)	Sanada (4:33)
Suzuki	Elgin (11:13)	Evil (8:38)	Suzuki (10:13)	Draw (30:00)	Omega (21:24)	Suzuki (11:23)	Suzuki (11:22)	—N/a	Suzuki (10:22)	Yano (6:56)
Tonga	Tonga (13:46)	Evil (10:27)	Tonga (10:43)	Okada (11:22)	Omega (11:41)	Tonga (10:36)	Tonga (11:59)	Suzuki (10:22)	—N/a	Yano (3:15)
Yano	Yano (2:58)	Evil (1:33)	Yano (9:12)	Okada (10:31)	Omega (11:31)	Robinson (4:25)	Sanada (4:33)	Yano (6:56)	Yano (3:15)	—N/a

Final
A1	Tetsuya Naito	Pin
B1	Kenny Omega	34:35

=== 2018 ===
The 2018 version of the G1 Climax took place from July 14 until August 12. Due to renovations at Ryōgoku Kokugikan, the final three shows for the tournament took place at Nippon Budokan, representing New Japan's first shows at that arena since 2003. The announcement of the participants, blocks and schedule took place during the 2018 Kizuna Road shows. Hiroshi Tanahashi set a then record for most points set by a wrestler in a 20-man G1 Climax with 15 points. The final match was the longest match in G1 history until it was beaten in 2020.

Final standings
Block A		Block B	
Hiroshi Tanahashi	15	Kota Ibushi	12
Kazuchika Okada	13	Kenny Omega	12
Jay White	12	Zack Sabre Jr.	12
Minoru Suzuki	10	Tetsuya Naito	12
Evil	10	Tomohiro Ishii	10
Yoshi-Hashi	6	Sanada	8
Michael Elgin	6	Juice Robinson	6
Togi Makabe	6	Hirooki Goto	6
Hangman Page	6	Toru Yano	6
Bad Luck Fale	6	Tama Tonga	6

Block A	Elgin	Evil	Fale	Makabe	Okada	Page	Suzuki	Tanahashi	White	Yoshi-Hashi
Elgin	—N/a	Elgin (16:08)	Elgin (11:13)	Makabe (8:46)	Okada (20:56)	Elgin (17:17)	Suzuki (14:10)	Tanahashi (16:03)	White (17:44)	Yoshi-Hashi (14:22)
Evil	Elgin (16:08)	—N/a	Evil (12:13)	Evil (10:16)	Okada (18:27)	Evil (15:40)	Suzuki (12:13)	Tanahashi (12:57)	Evil (11:36)	Evil (12:37)
Fale	Elgin (11:13)	Evil (12:13)	—N/a	Fale (7:51)	Fale (13:38)	Page (8:04)	Suzuki (8:51)	Tanahashi (16:27)	Fale (11:42)	Yoshi-Hashi (8:31)
Makabe	Makabe (8:46)	Evil (10:16)	Fale (7:51)	—N/a	Okada (15:11)	Page (9:10)	Makabe (14:58)	Tanahashi (12:00)	White (10:22)	Makabe (11:05)
Okada	Okada (20:56)	Okada (18:27)	Fale (13:38)	Okada (15:11)	—N/a	Okada (17:31)	Okada (18:20)	Draw (30:00)	White (25:36)	Okada (19:40)
Page	Elgin (17:17)	Evil (15:40)	Page (8:04)	Page (9:10)	Okada (17:31)	—N/a	Page (12:05)	Tanahashi (12:08)	White (17:10)	Yoshi-Hashi (10:22)
Suzuki	Suzuki (14:10)	Suzuki (12:13)	Suzuki (8:51)	Makabe (14:58)	Okada (18:20)	Page (12:05)	—N/a	Tanahashi (13:59)	Suzuki (10:35)	Suzuki (13:44)
Tanahashi	Tanahashi (16:03)	Tanahashi (12:57)	Tanahashi (16:27)	Tanahashi (12:00)	Draw (30:00)	Tanahashi (12:08)	Tanahashi (13:59)	—N/a	White (24:02)	Tanahashi (12:36)
White	White (17:44)	Evil (11:36)	Fale (11:42)	White (10:22)	White (25:36)	White (17:10)	Suzuki (10:35)	White (24:02)	—N/a	White (9:48)
Yoshi-Hashi	Yoshi-Hashi (14:22)	Evil (12:37)	Yoshi-Hashi (8:31)	Makabe (11:05)	Okada (19:40)	Yoshi-Hashi (10:22)	Suzuki (13:44)	Tanahashi (12:36)	White (9:48)	—N/a
Block B	Goto	Ibushi	Ishii	Naito	Omega	Robinson	Sabre	Sanada	Tonga	Yano
Goto	—N/a	Ibushi (18:09)	Ishii (18:15)	Naito (13:26)	Omega (19:29)	Robinson (10:36)	Sabre (10:43)	Goto (13:38)	Goto (11:15)	Goto (2:17)
Ibushi	Ibushi (18:09)	—N/a	Ibushi (16:13)	Ibushi (25:09)	Ibushi (23:13)	Ibushi (13:03)	Ibushi (22:58)	Sanada (22:23)	Tonga (14:17)	Yano (8:23)
Ishii	Ishii (18:15)	Ibushi (16:13)	—N/a	Naito (19:13)	Ishii (22:42)	Ishii (12:24)	Sabre (14:35)	Ishii (17:00)	Tonga (10:32)	Ishii (8:52)
Naito	Naito (13:26)	Ibushi (25:09)	Naito (19:13)	—N/a	Omega (23:19)	Naito (16:43)	Sabre (18:17)	Naito (19:52)	Naito (10:06)	Naito (8:28)
Omega	Omega (19:29)	Ibushi (23:13)	Ishii (22:42)	Omega (23:19)	—N/a	Omega (15:31)	Omega (15:14)	Omega (20:12)	Omega (9:55)	Yano (9:04)
Robinson	Robinson (10:36)	Ibushi (13:03)	Ishii (12:24)	Naito (16:43)	Omega (15:31)	—N/a	Sabre (13:39)	Robinson (12:36)	Tonga (14:05)	Robinson (8:28)
Sabre	Sabre (10:43)	Ibushi (22:58)	Sabre (14:35)	Sabre (18:17)	Omega (15:14)	Sabre (13:39)	—N/a	Sanada (10:45)	Sabre (10:59)	Sabre (10:34)
Sanada	Goto (13:38)	Sanada (22:23)	Ishii (17:00)	Naito (19:52)	Omega (20:12)	Robinson (12:36)	Sanada (10:45)	—N/a	Sanada (10:46)	Sanada (5:22)
Tonga	Goto (11:15)	Tonga (14:17)	Tonga (10:32)	Naito (10:06)	Omega (9:55)	Tonga (14:05)	Sabre (10:59)	Sanada (10:46)	—N/a	Yano (5:08)
Yano	Goto (2:17)	Yano (8:23)	Ishii (8:52)	Naito (8:28)	Yano (9:04)	Robinson (8:28)	Sabre (10:34)	Sanada (5:22)	Yano (5:08)	—N/a

Final
A1	Hiroshi Tanahashi	Pin
B1	Kota Ibushi	35:00

=== 2019 ===
The 2019 edition of the G1 Climax took place from July 6 to August 12 with the finals taking place at Nippon Budokan. For the first time in NJPW history, the opening night of the tournament took place outside Japan, at the American Airlines Center in Dallas, Texas. Kota Ibushi won the G1, defeating Jay White in the final.

Block A		Block B	
Kota Ibushi	14	Jay White	12
Kazuchika Okada	14	Hirooki Goto	10
Will Ospreay	8	Jon Moxley	10
Bad Luck Fale	8	Tetsuya Naito	10
Hiroshi Tanahashi	8	Jeff Cobb	8
Evil	8	Shingo Takagi	8
Zack Sabre Jr.	8	Tomohiro Ishii	8
Sanada	8	Taichi	8
Kenta	8	Juice Robinson	8
Lance Archer	6	Toru Yano	8

Block A	Archer	Evil	Fale	Ibushi	Kenta	Okada	Ospreay	Sabre	Sanada	Tanahashi
Archer	—N/a	Archer (10:02)	Archer (10:12)	Ibushi (11:42)	Kenta (11:58)	Okada (14:15)	Archer (18:16)	Sabre (10:43)	Sanada (10:28)	Tanahashi (11:58)
Evil	Archer (10:02)	—N/a	Fale (11:33)	Evil (19:11)	Kenta (15:03)	Okada (27:00)	Evil (17:08)	Evil (16:00)	Evil (18:11)	Tanahashi (23:02)
Fale	Archer (10:12)	Fale (11:33)	—N/a	Ibushi (9:27)	Fale (7:20)	Okada (10:15)	Ospreay (9:08)	Sabre (6:30)	Fale (10:38)	Fale (9:58)
Ibushi	Ibushi (11:42)	Evil (19:11)	Ibushi (9:27)	—N/a	Kenta (20:51)	Ibushi (25:07)	Ibushi (27:16)	Ibushi (15:46)	Ibushi (19:14)	Ibushi (15:53)
Kenta	Kenta (11:58)	Kenta (15:03)	Fale (7:20)	Kenta (20:51)	—N/a	Okada (26:53)	Ospreay (16:33)	Sabre (16:26)	Sanada (16:10)	Kenta (18:35)
Okada	Okada (14:15)	Okada (27:00)	Okada (10:15)	Ibushi (25:07)	Okada (26:53)	—N/a	Okada (21:56)	Okada (12:01)	Sanada (29:47)	Okada (22:04)
Ospreay	Archer (18:16)	Evil (17:08)	Ospreay (9:08)	Ibushi (27:16)	Ospreay (16:33)	Okada (21:56)	—N/a	Sabre (20:02)	Ospreay (17:06)	Ospreay (17:12)
Sabre	Sabre (10:43)	Evil (16:00)	Sabre (6:30)	Ibushi (15:46)	Sabre (16:26)	Okada (12:01)	Sabre (20:02)	—N/a	Sanada (21:12)	Tanahashi (13:56)
Sanada	Sanada (10:28)	Evil (18:11)	Fale (10:38)	Ibushi (19:14)	Sanada (16:10)	Sanada (29:47)	Ospreay (17:06)	Sanada (21:12)	—N/a	Tanahashi (18:07)
Tanahashi	Tanahashi (11:58)	Tanahashi (23:02)	Fale (9:58)	Ibushi (15:53)	Kenta (18:35)	Okada (22:04)	Ospreay (17:12)	Tanahashi (13:56)	Tanahashi (18:07)	—N/a
Block B	Cobb	Goto	Ishii	Moxley	Naito	Robinson	Taichi	Takagi	White	Yano
Cobb	—N/a	Goto (11:20)	Ishii (18:33)	Moxley (8:54)	Naito (12:47)	Cobb (13:21)	Cobb (12:30)	Cobb (12:27)	White (15:50)	Cobb (5:16)
Goto	Goto (11:20)	—N/a	Goto (18:01)	Goto (8:38)	Naito (16:01)	Robinson (12:23)	Taichi (12:11)	Takagi (15:10)	Goto (21:06)	Goto (1:42)
Ishii	Ishii (18:33)	Goto (18:01)	—N/a	Moxley (20:36)	Naito (18:58)	Ishii (17:54)	Taichi (11:56)	Takagi (22:41)	Ishii (19:13)	Ishii (9:36)
Moxley	Moxley (8:54)	Goto (8:38)	Moxley (20:36)	—N/a	Moxley (16:41)	Robinson (16:26)	Moxley (7:36)	Moxley (14:45)	White (15:15)	Yano (5:08)
Naito	Naito (12:47)	Naito (16:01)	Naito (18:58)	Moxley (16:41)	—N/a	Naito (13:47)	Taichi (21:01)	Naito (27:15)	White (18:51)	Yano (3:42)
Robinson	Cobb (13:21)	Robinson (12:23)	Ishii (17:54)	Robinson (16:26)	Naito (13:47)	—N/a	Taichi (12:27)	Robinson (14:41)	White (23:01)	Robinson (4:28)
Taichi	Cobb (12:30)	Taichi (12:11)	Taichi (11:56)	Moxley (7:36)	Taichi (21:01)	Taichi (12:27)	—N/a	Takagi (14:40)	White (15:07)	Yano (5:04)
Takagi	Cobb (12:27)	Takagi (15:10)	Takagi (22:41)	Moxley (14:45)	Naito (27:15)	Robinson (14:41)	Takagi (14:40)	—N/a	White (19:26)	Takagi (6:16)
White	White (15:50)	Goto (21:06)	Ishii (19:13)	White (15:15)	White (18:51)	White (23:01)	White (15:07)	White (19:26)	—N/a	Yano (3:04)
Yano	Cobb (5:16)	Goto (1:42)	Ishii (9:36)	Yano (5:08)	Yano (3:42)	Robinson (4:28)	Yano (5:04)	Takagi (6:16)	Yano (3:04)	—N/a

Final
A1	Kota Ibushi	Pin
B1	Jay White	31:01

=== 2020 ===
The 2020 edition of the G1 Climax took place from September 19 until October 18 with the final three days being held at Ryōgoku Kokugikan. This was the first time that the tournament was not held in the summer but in the autumn. This was due to the 2020 Summer Olympics in Tokyo originally being scheduled to be held when the tournament is usually held. Later, the Olympics were postponed due to the COVID-19 pandemic. The final match became the longest match in G1 Climax history, surpassing the previous record in 2018. Kota Ibushi became the third wrestler along with Masahiro Chono and Hiroyoshi Tenzan to win two consecutive G1 Climax tournaments and the first wrestler to reach the finals for the third time in a row.

Final standings
Block A		Block B	
Kota Ibushi	14	Sanada	12
Will Ospreay	12	Evil	12
Jay White	12	Tetsuya Naito	12
Kazuchika Okada	12	Kenta	10
Taichi	8	Zack Sabre Jr.	10
Jeff Cobb	8	Hirooki Goto	8
Tomohiro Ishii	8	Hiroshi Tanahashi	8
Shingo Takagi	8	Juice Robinson	8
Minoru Suzuki	6	Toru Yano	6
Yujiro Takahashi	2	Yoshi-Hashi	4

Tournament overview
Block A	Ibushi	Cobb	Okada	Ishii	Ospreay	Takagi	Suzuki	Taichi	White	Takahashi
Ibushi	—N/a	Ibushi (10:43)	Ibushi (21:35)	Ibushi (15:41)	Ibushi (15:56)	Takagi (21:56)	Ibushi (16:58)	Ibushi (17:12)	White (20:28)	Ibushi (12:28)
Cobb	Ibushi (10:43)	—N/a	Okada (11:03)	Cobb (14:57)	Cobb (12:21)	Cobb (11:44)	Suzuki (9:24)	Taichi (12:47)	Cobb (12:24)	Takahashi (10:30)
Okada	Ibushi (21:35)	Okada (11:03)	—N/a	Okada (26:13)	Ospreay (17:04)	Okada (27:45)	Okada (14:10)	Okada (17:03)	White (18:48)	Okada (12:01)
Ishii	Ibushi (15:41)	Cobb (14:57)	Okada (26:13)	—N/a	Ospreay (18:20)	Ishii (26:01)	Suzuki (13:00)	Ishii (18:41)	Ishii (24:35)	Ishii (15:25)
Ospreay	Ibushi (15:56)	Cobb (12:21)	Ospreay (17:04)	Ospreay (18:20)	—N/a	Takagi (22:03)	Ospreay (14:26)	Ospreay (16:26)	Ospreay (18:46)	Ospreay (7:34)
Takagi	Takagi (21:56)	Cobb (11:44)	Okada (27:45)	Ishii (26:01)	Takagi (22:03)	—N/a	Takagi (12:29)	Taichi (16:21)	White (19:28)	Takagi (13:38)
Suzuki	Ibushi (16:28)	Suzuki (9:24)	Okada (14:10)	Suzuki (13:00)	Ospreay (14:26)	Takagi (12:29)	—N/a	Taichi (12:11)	White (20:30)	Suzuki (7:53)
Taichi	Ibushi (17:12)	Taichi (12:47)	Okada (17:03)	Ishii (18:41)	Ospreay (16:26)	Taichi (16:21)	Taichi (12:11)	—N/a	White (15:16)	Taichi (11:03)
White	White (20:28)	Cobb (12:24)	White (18:48)	Ishii (24:35)	Ospreay (18:46)	White (19:28)	White (20:30)	White (15:16)	—N/a	White (3:40)
Takahashi	Ibushi (12:28)	Takahashi (10:30)	Okada (12:01)	Ishii (15:25)	Ospreay (7:34)	Takagi (13:38)	Suzuki (7:53)	Taichi (11:03)	White (3:40)	—N/a
Block B	Tanahashi	Robinson	Goto	Yano	Yoshi-Hashi	Naito	Sanada	Sabre	Kenta	Evil
Tanahashi	—N/a	Tanahashi (14:16)	Goto (13:38)	Yano (7:15)	Tanahashi (18:41)	Naito (27:16)	Sanada (28:25)	Tanahashi (12:01)	Tanahashi (23:41)	Evil (19:58)
Robinson	Tanahashi (14:16)	—N/a	Robinson (12:07)	Robinson (6:42)	Robinson (15:57)	Naito (25:01)	Sanada (15:06)	Sabre (14:30)	Robinson (17:01)	Evil (15:35)
Goto	Goto (13:38)	Robinson (12:07)	—N/a	Goto (0:18)	Goto (14:12)	Naito (21:58)	Goto (11:03)	Sabre (3:59)	Kenta (17:15)	Evil (15:33)
Yano	Yano (7:15)	Robinson (6:42)	Goto (0:18)	—N/a	Yoshi-Hashi (6:10)	Naito (8:04)	Yano (6:16)	Sabre (12:20)	Kenta (8:56)	Yano (4:33)
Yoshi-Hashi	Tanahashi (18:41)	Robinson (15:57)	Goto (14:12)	Yoshi-Hashi (6:10)	—N/a	Naito (24:43)	Yoshi-Hashi (15:15)	Sabre (13:34)	Kenta (17:39)	Evil (17:21)
Naito	Naito (27:16)	Naito (25:01)	Naito (21:58)	Naito (8:04)	Naito (24:43)	—N/a	Sanada (27:08)	Naito (28:28)	Kenta (21:06)	Evil (23:57)
Sanada	Sanada (28:25)	Sanada (15:06)	Goto (11:03)	Yano (6:16)	Yoshi-Hashi (15:15)	Sanada (27:08)	—N/a	Sanada (14:31)	Sanada (11:24)	Sanada (27:01)
Sabre	Tanahashi (12:01)	Sabre (14:30)	Sabre (3:59)	Sabre (12:20)	Sabre (13:34)	Naito (28:28)	Sanada (14:31)	—N/a	Kenta (15:46)	Sabre (14:54)
Kenta	Tanahashi (23:41)	Robinson (17:01)	Kenta (17:15)	Kenta (8:56)	Kenta (17:36)	Kenta (21:06)	Sanada (11:24)	Kenta (15:46)	—N/a	Evil (15:40)
Evil	Evil (19:58)	Evil (15:35)	Evil (15:33)	Yano (4:33)	Evil (17:21)	Evil (23:57)	Sanada (27:01)	Sabre (14:54)	Evil (15:40)	—N/a

Final
A1	Kota Ibushi	Pin (Note: Ibushi became the first wrestler to win back to back G1 Climax tournaments since Hiroyoshi Tenzan in 2003 and 2004.)
B1	Sanada	35:12

=== 2021 ===
The 2021 edition of the G1 Climax was announced on July 8 and took place from September 18 until October 21 with the finals taking place at Nippon Budokan. Kazuchika Okada and Jeff Cobb set the record for the most points in a 20-man G1 with 16 points each; Cobb also set the record for most consecutive wins in a single G1 Climax with 8 wins in a row. Kota Ibushi also made his fourth consecutive appearance in a G1 final. Okada was awarded the G1 win in the tournament final by referee stoppage, after Kota suffered an unplanned injury.

Final standings
A Block		B Block	
Kota Ibushi	14	Kazuchika Okada	16
Shingo Takagi	13	Jeff Cobb	16
Kenta	12	Evil	14
Zack Sabre Jr.	12	Hiroshi Tanahashi	8
Toru Yano	10	Sanada	8
Tomohiro Ishii	10	Hirooki Goto	6
Great-O-Khan	8	Yoshi-Hashi	6
Tanga Loa	6	Tama Tonga	6
Yujiro Takahashi	5	Taichi	6
Tetsuya Naito (withdrawn)	0	Chase Owens	4

Tournament overview
Block A	O-Khan	Ibushi	Ishii	Kenta	Loa	Naito	Sabre	Takagi	Takahashi	Yano
O-Khan	—N/a	Ibushi (20:22)	Ishii (26:26)	Kenta (19:39)	O-Khan (17:45)	O-Khan (Forfeit)	Sabre (15:26)	Takagi (25:50)	O-Khan (14:15)	O-Khan (11:30)
Ibushi	Ibushi (20:22)	—N/a	Ibushi (17:42)	Ibushi (26:16)	Ibushi (13:46)	Ibushi (Forfeit)	Sabre (19:55)	Ibushi (23:57)	Takahashi (11:31)	Ibushi (4:03)
Ishii	Ishii (26:26)	Ibushi (17:42)	—N/a	Kenta (21:08)	Ishii (16:18)	Ishii (Forfeit)	Ishii (18:40)	Takagi (27:56)	Ishii (17:00)	Yano (11:08)
Kenta	Kenta (19:39)	Ibushi (26:16)	Kenta (21:08)	—N/a	Kenta (22:12)	Kenta (Forfeit)	Kenta (22:24)	Takagi (23:56)	Kenta (15:48)	Yano (11:07)
Loa	O-Khan (17:45)	Ibushi (13:46)	Ishii (16:18)	Kenta (22:12)	—N/a	Loa (Forfeit)	Loa (17:31)	Takagi (19:08)	Loa (12:36)	Yano (10:46)
Naito	O-Khan (Forfeit)	Ibushi (Forfeit)	Ishii (Forfeit)	Kenta (Forfeit)	Loa (Forfeit)	—N/a	Sabre (27:05)	Takagi (Forfeit)	Takahashi (Forfeit)	Yano (Forfeit)
Sabre	Sabre (15:26)	Sabre (19:55)	Ishii (18:40)	Kenta (22:24)	Loa (17:31)	Sabre (27:05)	—N/a	Sabre (27:17)	Sabre (14:15)	Sabre (6:42)
Takagi	Takagi (25:50)	Ibushi (23:57)	Takagi (27:56)	Takagi (23:56)	Takagi (19:08)	Takagi (Forfeit)	Sabre (27:17)	—N/a	Draw (13:36)	Takagi (8:17)
Takahashi	O-Khan (14:15)	Takahashi (11:31)	Ishii (17:00)	Kenta (15:48)	Loa (12:36)	Takahashi (Forfeit)	Sabre (14:15)	Draw (13:36)	—N/a	Yano (10:23)
Yano	O-Khan (11:30)	Ibushi (4:03)	Yano (11:08)	Yano (11:07)	Yano (10:46)	Yano (Forfeit)	Sabre (6:42)	Takagi (8:17)	Yano (10:23)	—N/a
Block B	Cobb	Evil	Goto	Okada	Owens	Sanada	Taichi	Tanahashi	Tonga	Yoshi-Hashi
Cobb	—N/a	Cobb (16:45)	Cobb (15:08)	Okada (23:35)	Cobb (12:11)	Cobb (14:17)	Cobb (15:15)	Cobb (19:05)	Cobb (12:35)	Cobb (13:21)
Evil	Cobb (16:45)	—N/a	Evil (14:16)	Okada (21:46)	Evil (12:28)	Evil (17:47)	Evil (11:30)	Evil (17:22)	Evil (13:47)	Evil (17:15)
Goto	Cobb (15:08)	Evil (14:16)	—N/a	Okada (18:06)	Goto (12:41)	Sanada (15:32)	Taichi (18:30)	Tanahashi (14:10)	Goto (15:19)	Goto (16:57)
Okada	Okada (23:35)	Okada (21:46)	Okada (18:06)	—N/a	Okada (15:37)	Okada (29:14)	Okada (23:10)	Okada (29:36)	Tonga (24:45)	Okada (26:53)
Owens	Cobb (12:11)	Evil (12:28)	Goto (12:41)	Okada (15:37)	—N/a	Sanada (11:58)	Owens (12:05)	Owens (10:58)	Tonga (12:59)	Yoshi-Hashi (8:27)
Sanada	Cobb (14:17)	Evil (17:47)	Sanada (15:32)	Okada (29:14)	Sanada (11:58)	—N/a	Taichi (25:15)	Tanahashi (18:06)	Sanada (19:04)	Sanada (17:35)
Taichi	Cobb (15:15)	Evil (11:30)	Taichi (18:30)	Okada (23:10)	Owens (12:05)	Taichi (25:15)	—N/a	Taichi (14:58)	Tonga (12:58)	Yoshi-Hashi (22:23)
Tanahashi	Cobb (19:05)	Evil (17:22)	Tanahashi (14:10)	Okada (29:36)	Owens (10:58)	Tanahashi (18:06)	Taichi (14:58)	—N/a	Tanahashi (14:07)	Tanahashi (14:13)
Tonga	Cobb (12:35)	Evil (13:47)	Goto (15:19)	Tonga (24:45)	Tonga (12:59)	Sanada (19:04)	Tonga (12:58)	Tanahashi (14:07)	—N/a	Yoshi-Hashi (13:14)
Yoshi-Hashi	Cobb (13:21)	Evil (17:15)	Goto (16:57)	Okada (26:53)	Yoshi-Hashi (8:27)	Sanada (17:35)	Yoshi-Hashi (22:26)	Tanahashi (14:13)	Yoshi-Hashi (13:14)	—N/a

Final
A1	Kota Ibushi	25:37
B1	Kazuchika Okada	Stop

=== 2022 ===
The 2022 edition of the G1 Climax was announced on April 9 at Hyper Battle and took place from July 16 until August 18, returning the G1 to the summer. This edition consisted of 28 participants across 4 blocks. The Final match was between Kazuchika Okada and Will Ospreay, which Okada won by pinfall, marking Okada's 4th G1 Climax victory and becoming the 4th wrestler to win two consecutive G1 Climax tournaments, alongside Masahiro Chono, Hiroyoshi Tenzan and Kota Ibushi.

Final standings
Block A		Block B		Block C		Block D	
Kazuchika Okada	10	Tama Tonga	10	Tetsuya Naito	8	Will Ospreay	8
Jonah	8	Jay White	10	Zack Sabre Jr.	8	El Phantasmo	6
Lance Archer	6	Sanada	6	Evil	6	Shingo Takagi	6
Tom Lawlor	6	Taichi	4	Kenta	6	Yujiro Takahashi	6
Jeff Cobb	6	Great-O-Khan	4	Hirooki Goto	6	Yoshi-Hashi	6
Bad Luck Fale	4	Chase Owens	4	Hiroshi Tanahashi	6	David Finlay	6
Toru Yano	2	Tomohiro Ishii	4	Aaron Henare	2	Juice Robinson	4

Tournament overview
Block A	Okada	Yano	Cobb	Archer	Fale	Lawlor	Jonah
Okada	—N/a	Okada (10:10)	Okada (21:30)	Okada (12:43)	Okada (11:52)	Okada (16:16)	Jonah (21:53)
Yano	Okada (10:10)	—N/a	Cobb (4:28)	Archer (9:14)	Fale (5:36)	Lawlor (10:13)	Yano (9:01)
Cobb	Okada (21:30)	Cobb (4:28)	—N/a	Cobb (11:37)	Cobb (7:13)	Lawlor (14:03)	Jonah (14:50)
Archer	Okada (12:43)	Archer (9:14)	Cobb (11:37)	—N/a	Fale (10:46)	Archer (11:50)	Archer (12:43)
Fale	Okada (11:52)	Fale (5:36)	Cobb (7:13)	Fale (10:46)	—N/a	Lawlor (11:05)	Jonah (9:13)
Lawlor	Okada (16:16)	Lawlor (10:13)	Lawlor (14:03)	Archer (11:50)	Lawlor (11:05)	—N/a	Jonah (11:32)
Jonah	Jonah (21:53)	Yano (9:01)	Jonah (14:50)	Archer (12:43)	Jonah (9:13)	Jonah (11:32)	—N/a
Block B	White	Taichi	Tonga	Ishii	Sanada	O-Khan	Owens
White	—N/a	White (23:30)	Tonga (13:56)	White (22:02)	White (18:07)	White (18:14)	White (13:12)
Taichi	White (23:30)	—N/a	Tonga (16:53)	Taichi (15:21)	Sanada (16:09)	O-Khan (7:06)	Taichi (13:25)
Tonga	Tonga (13:56)	Tonga (16:53)	—N/a	Ishii (20:07)	Tonga (16:28)	Tonga (14:32)	Tonga (13:18)
Ishii	White (22:02)	Taichi (15:21)	Ishii (20:07)	—N/a	Ishii (12:35)	O-Khan (12:59)	Owens (16:50)
Sanada	White (18:07)	Sanada (16:09)	Tonga (16:28)	Ishii (12:35)	—N/a	Sanada (16:35)	Sanada (12:45)
O-Khan	White (18:14)	O-Khan (7:06)	Tonga (14:32)	O-Khan (12:59)	Sanada (16:35)	—N/a	Owens (11:58)
Owens	White (13:12)	Taichi (13:25)	Tonga (13:18)	Owens (16:50)	Sanada (12:45)	Owens (11:58)	—N/a
Block C	Tanahashi	Naito	Evil	Goto	Sabre	Kenta	Henare
Tanahashi	—N/a	Tanahashi (22:22)	Tanahashi (19:01)	Goto (19:01)	Tanahashi (17:32)	Kenta (23:46)	Henare (11:11)
Naito	Tanahashi (22:22)	—N/a	Naito (24:54)	Goto (22:41)	Naito (1:58)	Naito (23:30)	Naito (17:31)
Evil	Tanahashi (19:01)	Naito (24:54)	—N/a	Evil (8:40)	Sabre (0:44)	Evil (10:13)	Evil (10:28)
Goto	Goto (19:01)	Goto (22:41)	Evil (8:40)	—N/a	Sabre (17:31)	Kenta (18:08)	Goto (17:12)
Sabre	Tanahashi (17:32)	Naito (1:58)	Sabre (0:44)	Sabre (17:31)	—N/a	Sabre (21:33)	Sabre (14:15)
Kenta	Kenta (23:46)	Naito (23:30)	Evil (10:13)	Kenta (18:08)	Sabre (21:33)	—N/a	Kenta (12:35)
Henare	Henare (11:11)	Naito (17:31)	Evil (10:28)	Goto (17:12)	Sabre (14:15)	Kenta (12:35)	—N/a
Block D	Ospreay	Takagi	Robinson	Yoshi-Hashi	Phantasmo	Takahashi	Finlay
Ospreay	—N/a	Takagi (21:55)	Ospreay (11:07)	Ospreay (18:48)	Ospreay (15:06)	Ospreay (11:17)	Finlay (15:28)
Takagi	Takagi (21:55)	—N/a	Robinson (21:33)	Takagi (17:28)	Phantasmo (12:12)	Takagi (15:24)	Finlay (14:50)
Robinson	Ospreay (11:07)	Robinson (21:33)	—N/a	Yoshi-Hashi (12:16)	Robinson (16:09)	Takahashi (11:36)	Finlay (24:01)
Yoshi-Hashi	Ospreay (18:48)	Takagi (17:28)	Yoshi-Hashi (12:16)	—N/a	Yoshi-Hashi (15:47)	Takahashi (13:12)	Yoshi-Hashi (11:14)
Phantasmo	Ospreay (15:06)	Phantasmo (12:12)	Robinson (16:09)	Yoshi-Hashi (15:47)	—N/a	Phantasmo (15:39)	Phantasmo (14:23)
Takahashi	Ospreay (11:17)	Takagi (15:24)	Takahashi (11:36)	Takahashi (13:12)	Phantasmo (15:39)	—N/a	Takahashi (12:59)
Finlay	Finlay (15:28)	Finlay (14:50)	Finlay (24:01)	Yoshi-Hashi (11:14)	Phantasmo (14:23)	Takahashi (12:59)	—N/a

Semifinals
A1	Kazuchika Okada	Pin
B1	Tama Tonga	19:08
C1	Tetsuya Naito	20:23
D1	Will Ospreay	Pin

Final
A1	Kazuchika Okada	Pin
D1	Will Ospreay	33:53

=== 2023 ===
The 2023 edition of the G1 Climax was announced on April 8 at Sakura Genesis and took place from July 15 until August 13. The tournament featured 32 participants, making it the largest G1 to date. The 2023 G1 Climax also featured the tournament debuts of Shota Umino, Hikuleo, Eddie Kingston, Ren Narita, Gabriel Kidd, Alex Coughlin, Shane Haste, Mikey Nicholls, Yota Tsuji and Kaito Kiyomiya with Kingston and Kiyomiya being outsiders from All Elite Wrestling and Pro Wrestling Noah respectively. In the finals, Tetsuya Naito defeated Kazuchika Okada to win his third G1 Climax.

Final standings
Block A		Block B		Block C		Block D	
Sanada	14	Kazuchika Okada	12	David Finlay	10	Tetsuya Naito	10
Hikuleo	8	Will Ospreay	10	Evil	10	Zack Sabre Jr.	10
Yota Tsuji	7	El Phantasmo	6	Tama Tonga	9	Jeff Cobb	9
Ren Narita	6	Tanga Loa	6	Eddie Kingston	8	Alex Coughlin	6
Shota Umino	6	Kenta	6	Shingo Takagi	7	Hiroshi Tanahashi	6
Kaito Kiyomiya	6	Great-O-Khan	6	Mikey Nicholls	4	Hirooki Goto	6
Gabe Kidd	5	Taichi	6	Henare	4	Shane Haste	5
Chase Owens	4	Yoshi-Hashi	4	Tomohiro Ishii	4	Toru Yano	4

Tournament overview
Block A	Sanada	Owens	Hikuleo	Narita	Umino	Tsuji	Kidd	Kiyomiya
Sanada	—N/a	Sanada (9:13)	Sanada (10:16)	Sanada (16:30)	Sanada (18:48)	Sanada (18:36)	Sanada (12:08)	Sanada (19:58)
Owens	Sanada (9:13)	—N/a	Owens (11:20)	Narita (9:08)	Umino (9:35)	Tsuji (11:42)	Owens (2:55)	Kiyomiya (8:28)
Hikuleo	Sanada (10:16)	Owens (11:20)	—N/a	Hikuleo (11:58)	Hikuleo (17:21)	Hikuleo (12:12)	Kidd (3:29)	Hikuleo (9:46)
Narita	Sanada (16:30)	Narita (9:08)	Hikuleo (11:58)	—N/a	Draw (20:00)	Draw (20:00)	Kidd (10:05)	Narita (15:17)
Umino	Sanada (18:48)	Umino (9:35)	Hikuleo (17:21)	Draw (20:00)	—N/a	Tsuji (19:20)	Umino (13:03)	Draw (20:00)
Tsuji	Sanada (18:36)	Tsuji (11:42)	Hikuleo (12:12)	Draw (20:00)	Tsuji (19:20)	—N/a	Tsuji (14:47)	Kiyomiya (14:48)
Kidd	Sanada (12:08)	Owens (2:55)	Kidd (3:29)	Kidd (10:05)	Umino (13:03)	Tsuji (14:47)	—N/a	Draw (11:44)
Kiyomiya	Sanada (19:58)	Kiyomiya (8:28)	Hikuleo (9:46)	Narita (15:17)	Draw (20:00)	Kiyomiya (14:48)	Draw (11:44)	—N/a
Block B	Okada	Yoshi-Hashi	Taichi	Kenta	O-Khan	Ospreay	Loa	Phantasmo
Okada	—N/a	Okada (16:32)	Okada (16:20)	Okada (19:10)	Okada (15:23)	Ospreay (17:21)	Okada (12:33)	Okada (16:21)
Yoshi-Hashi	Okada (16:32)	—N/a	Taichi (13:13)	Kenta (12:16)	O-Khan (13:50)	Ospreay (13:04)	Yoshi-Hashi (12:35)	Yoshi-Hashi (10:56)
Taichi	Okada (16:20)	Taichi (13:13)	—N/a	Kenta (2:11)	O-Khan (17:41)	Taichi (17:43)	Taichi (12:34)	Phantasmo (13:56)
Kenta	Okada (19:10)	Kenta (12:16)	Kenta (2:11)	—N/a	Kenta (11:40)	Ospreay (14:02)	Loa (12:46)	Phantasmo (0:19)
O-Khan	Okada (15:23)	O-Khan (13:50)	O-Khan (17:41)	Kenta (11:40)	—N/a	Ospreay (11:20)	Loa (12:41)	O-Khan (12:46)
Ospreay	Ospreay (17:21)	Ospreay (13:04)	Taichi (17:43)	Ospreay (14:02)	Ospreay (11:20)	—N/a	Loa (15:34)	Ospreay (18:52)
Loa	Okada (12:33)	Yoshi-Hashi (12:35)	Taichi (12:34)	Loa (12:46)	Loa (12:41)	Loa (15:34)	—N/a	Phantasmo (12:14)
Phantasmo	Okada (16:21)	Yoshi-Hashi (10:56)	Phantasmo (13:56)	Phantasmo (0:19)	O-Khan (12:46)	Ospreay (18:52)	Phantasmo (12:14)	—N/a
Block C	Finlay	Ishii	Evil	Tonga	Takagi	Henare	Kingston	Nicholls
Finlay	—N/a	Finlay (15:55)	Finlay (16:12)	Tonga (14:22)	Takagi (18:45)	Finlay (11:54)	Finlay (16:34)	Finlay (9:52)
Ishii	Finlay (15:55)	—N/a	Evil (14:36)	Tonga (15:38)	Takagi (18:10)	Henare (14:21)	Ishii (16:12)	Ishii (13:01)
Evil	Finlay (16:12)	Evil (14:36)	—N/a	Evil (17:34)	Evil (17:40)	Evil (12:03)	Evil (15:15)	Nicholls (9:40)
Tonga	Tonga (14:22)	Tonga (15:38)	Evil (17:34)	—N/a	Draw (20:00)	Tonga (14:30)	Kingston (11:39)	Tonga (9:10)
Takagi	Takagi (18:45)	Takagi (18:10)	Evil (17:40)	Draw (20:00)	—N/a	Henare (19:38)	Kingston (12:50)	Takagi (9:13)
Henare	Finlay (11:54)	Henare (14:21)	Evil (12:03)	Tonga (14:30)	Henare (19:38)	—N/a	Kingston (10:32)	Nicholls (12:21)
Kingston	Finlay (16:34)	Ishii (16:12)	Evil (15:15)	Kingston (11:39)	Kingston (12:50)	Kingston (10:32)	—N/a	Kingston (8:33)
Nicholls	Finlay (9:52)	Ishii (13:01)	Nicholls (9:40)	Tonga (9:10)	Takagi (9:13)	Nicholls (12:21)	Kingston (8:33)	—N/a
Block D	Tanahashi	Naito	Goto	Sabre	Yano	Cobb	Haste	Coughlin
Tanahashi	—N/a	Naito (17:54)	Tanahashi (14:40)	Sabre (16:09)	Tanahashi (7:45)	Cobb (10:30)	Tanahashi (12:04)	Coughlin (8:50)
Naito	Naito (17:54)	—N/a	Naito (17:40)	Naito (18:30)	Naito (7:24)	Cobb (14:20)	Haste (13:44)	Naito (10:07)
Goto	Tanahashi (14:40)	Naito (17:40)	—N/a	Sabre (14:30)	Goto (6:44)	Goto (11:33)	Goto (2:29)	Coughlin (6:23)
Sabre	Sabre (16:09)	Naito (18:30)	Sabre (14:30)	—N/a	Sabre (5:37)	Cobb (16:16)	Sabre (13:23)	Sabre (11:13)
Yano	Tanahashi (7:45)	Naito (7:24)	Goto (6:44)	Sabre (5:37)	—N/a	Yano (1:49)	Yano (6:09)	Coughlin (5:07)
Cobb	Cobb (10:30)	Cobb (14:20)	Goto (11:33)	Cobb (16:16)	Yano (1:49)	—N/a	Draw (11:10)	Cobb (9:51)
Haste	Tanahashi (12:04)	Haste (13:44)	Goto (2:29)	Sabre (13:23)	Yano (6:09)	Draw (11:10)	—N/a	Haste (10:55)
Coughlin	Coughlin (8:50)	Naito (10:07)	Coughlin (6:23)	Sabre (11:13)	Coughlin (5:07)	Cobb (9:51)	Haste (10:55)	—N/a

Quarterfinals
A1	Sanada	16:16
C2	Evil	Pin
B1	Kazuchika Okada	Pin
D2	Zack Sabre Jr.	21:46
C1	David Finlay	17:21
B2	Will Ospreay	Pin
D1	Tetsuya Naito	Pin
A2	Hikuleo	13:11

Semifinals
C2	Evil	18:18
B1	Kazuchika Okada	Pin
B2	Will Ospreay	29:58
D1	Tetsuya Naito	Pin

Finals
B1	Kazuchika Okada	34:18
D1	Tetsuya Naito	Pin

=== 2024 ===
The 2024 edition of the G1 Climax was announced on June 9 at Dominion 6.9 in Osaka-jo Hall and took place from July 20 until August 18. The tournament saw a return to 20 participants split into two 10-man blocks for the first time since 2021. Only the top 3 wrestlers in each block advanced, with the block winners earning a bye into the semifinals. The tournament marked the tournament debuts of Callum Newman, Boltin Oleg, Jake Lee, Yuya Uemura, and AEW–DDT representative Konosuke Takeshita. In the finals, Zack Sabre Jr defeated Yota Tsuji to win his first G1 Climax. This would mark the second time a non-Japanese wrestler had won the tournament under that banner.

Standings
Block A		Block B	
Zack Sabre Jr.	14	David Finlay	12
Shingo Takagi	10	Konosuke Takeshita	10
Great-O-Khan	10	Yota Tsuji	10
Evil	10	Ren Narita	10
Tetsuya Naito	10	Jeff Cobb	10
Jake Lee	8	Henare	8
Sanada	8	Hirooki Goto	8
Gabe Kidd	8	Boltin Oleg	8
Shota Umino	8	Yuya Uemura (withdrawn)	8
Callum Newman	4	El Phantasmo	6

Block A	Evil	Kidd	Lee	Naito	Newman	O-Khan	Sanada	Sabre	Takagi	Umino
Evil	—N/a	Evil (10:19)	Evil (11:20)	Evil (16:11)	Evil (8:40)	O-Khan (16:25)	Evil (18:04)	Sabre (0:19)	Takagi (16:57)	Umino (19:46)
Kidd	Evil (10:19)	—N/a	Lee (4:53)	Naito (14:08)	Kidd (4:51)	Kidd (12:01)	Sanada (11:14)	Sabre (16:19)	Kidd (13:50)	Kidd (15:56)
Lee	Evil (11:20)	Lee (4:53)	—N/a	Naito (17:02)	Lee (11:14)	O-Khan (11:19)	Lee (4:57)	Sabre (17:46)	Takagi (13:49)	Lee (16:03)
Naito	Evil (15:11)	Naito (14:08)	Naito (17:03)	—N/a	Naito (6:55)	O-Khan (18:57)	Naito (17:43)	Sabre (16:03)	Takagi (23:23)	Naito (14:47)
Newman	Evil (8:40)	Kidd (4:51)	Lee (11:14)	Naito (6:55)	—N/a	O-Khan (8:16)	Sanada (8:41)	Sabre (11:56)	Newman (12:51)	Newman (9:45)
O-Khan	O-Khan (16:21)	Kidd (12:01)	O-Khan (11:19)	O-Khan (18:57)	O-Khan (8:16)	—N/a	O-Khan (11:11)	Sabre (11:10)	Takagi (11:04)	Umino (15:06)
Sanada	Evil (18:06)	Sanada (11:14)	Lee (4:57)	Naito (17:43)	Sanada (8:41)	O-Khan (11:11)	—N/a	Sabre (15:44)	Sanada (19:45)	Sanada (15:57)
Sabre	Sabre (0:19)	Sabre (16:19)	Sabre (17:46)	Sabre (16:03)	Sabre (11:56)	Sabre (11:10)	Sabre (15:44)	—N/a	Takagi (16:13)	Umino (19:13)
Takagi	Takagi (16:57)	Kidd (13:50)	Takagi (13:49)	Takagi (23:23)	Newman (12:51)	Takagi (11:04)	Sanada (19:45)	Takagi (16:13)	—N/a	Umino (18:22)
Umino	Umino (19:46)	Kidd (15:56)	Lee (16:03)	Naito (14:47)	Newman (9:45)	Umino (15:06)	Sanada (15:57)	Umino (19:13)	Umino (18:22)	—N/a
Block B	Cobb	Finlay	Goto	Henare	Narita	Boltin	Phantasmo	Takeshita	Tsuji	Uemura
Cobb	—N/a	Finlay (11:39)	Cobb (7:24)	Cobb (12:40)	Narita (12:02)	Cobb (10:09)	Cobb (11:12)	Takeshita (10:28)	Tsuji (11:36)	Cobb (12:29)
Finlay	Finlay (11:39)	—N/a	Goto (17:47)	Finlay (16:09)	Finlay (11:01)	Finlay (12:44)	Finlay (12:32)	Finlay (18:22)	Tsuji (19:50)	Uemura (16:22)
Goto	Cobb (7:24)	Goto (17:47)	—N/a	Henare (12:46)	Narita (12:19)	Goto (10:17)	Phantasmo (13:04)	Goto (14:04)	Goto (17:05)	Uemura (12:38)
Henare	Cobb (12:40)	Finlay (16:09)	Henare (12:46)	—N/a	Narita (13:17)	Henare (8:07)	Henare (9:26)	Takeshita (13:19)	Tsuji (15:37)	Henare (15:33)
Narita	Narita (12:02)	Finlay (11:01)	Narita (12:19)	Narita (13:17)	—N/a	Boltin (7:46)	Narita (14:16)	Takeshita (16:48)	Tsuji (20:21)	Narita (11:47)
Boltin	Cobb (10:09)	Finlay (12:44)	Goto (10:17)	Henare (8:07)	Boltin (7:46)	—N/a	Boltin (12:16)	Boltin (12:09)	Tsuji (10:06)	Boltin (Forfeit)
Phantasmo	Cobb (11:12)	Finlay (12:32)	Phantasmo (13:04)	Henare (9:26)	Narita (14:16)	Boltin (12:16)	—N/a	Takeshita (17:21)	Phantasmo (17:57)	Phantasmo (14:21)
Takeshita	Takeshita (10:28)	Finlay (18:22)	Goto (14:04)	Takeshita (13:19)	Takeshita (16:48)	Boltin (12:09)	Takeshita (17:21)	—N/a	Takeshita (17:14)	Uemura (23:10)
Tsuji	Tsuji (11:36)	Tsuji (19:50)	Goto (17:05)	Tsuji (15:37)	Tsuji (20:21)	Tsuji (10:06)	Phantasmo (17:57)	Takeshita (17:14)	—N/a	Uemura (16:09)
Uemura	Cobb (12:29)	Uemura (16:22)	Uemura (12:38)	Henare (15:33)	Narita (11:47)	Boltin (Forfeit)	Phantasmo (14:21)	Uemura (23:10)	Uemura (16:09)	—N/a

Quarterfinals
A2	Shingo Takagi	Pin
A3	Great-O-Khan	20:49
B2	Konosuke Takeshita	21:29
B3	Yota Tsuji	Pin

Semifinals
A1	Zack Sabre Jr.	Sub
A2	Shingo Takagi	27:36
B1	David Finlay	28:05
B3	Yota Tsuji	Pin

Finals
A1	Zack Sabre Jr.	Sub
B3	Yota Tsuji	31:04

=== 2025 ===
The 2025 edition of the G1 Climax was announced on April 7 and took place from July 19 until August 17. Only the top 3 wrestlers in each block advanced, with the block winners earning a bye into the semifinals. This tournament marked the debuts of Ryohei Oiwa and Drilla Moloney, and would mark the last G1 Climax of Hiroshi Tanahashi, who was on his retirement tour and would go on to retire at Wrestle Kingdom 20. In the finals, Konosuke Takeshita defeated EVIL to win his first G1 Climax.

Final standings
Block A		Block B	
Evil	12	Zack Sabre Jr.	14
David Finlay	10	Shota Umino	12
Yota Tsuji	10	Konosuke Takeshita	12
Yuya Uemura	10	Shingo Takagi	10
Boltin Oleg	10	Ren Narita	10
Hiroshi Tanahashi	8	Great-O-Khan	8
Callum Newman	8	Drilla Moloney	8
Ryohei Oiwa	8	El Phantasmo	8
Sanada	8	Yoshi-Hashi	8
Taichi	6	Gabe Kidd	0

Tournament overview
Block A	Boltin	Evil	Finlay	Newman	Oiwa	Sanada	Taichi	Tanahashi	Tsuji	Uemura
Boltin	—N/a	Evil (9:44)	Finlay (10:52)	Boltin (10:54)	Boltin (9:10)	Boltin (9:57)	Boltin (12:14)	Boltin (9:50)	Tsuji (10:03)	Uemura (11:03)
Evil	Evil (9:44)	—N/a	Finlay (10:32)	Evil (9:02)	Evil (9:27)	Sanada (6:33)	Evil (10:31)	Evil (12:50)	Evil (11:01)	Uemura (13:42)
Finlay	Finlay (10:52)	Finlay (10:32)	—N/a	Newman (10:31)	Oiwa (13:10)	Finlay (10:21)	Taichi (13:35)	Tanahashi (16:02)	Finlay (15:21)	Finlay (23:01)
Newman	Boltin (10:54)	Evil (9:02)	Newman (10:31)	—N/a	Oiwa (10:24)	Newman (10:11)	Newman (12:50)	Newman (7:32)	Tsuji (11:17)	Uemura (10:32)
Oiwa	Boltin (9:10)	Evil (9:27)	Oiwa (13:10)	Oiwa (10:24)	—N/a	Sanada (10:26)	Oiwa (11:50)	Oiwa (14:20)	Tsuji (13:43)	Uemura (18:23)
Sanada	Boltin (9:57)	Sanada (6:33)	Finlay (10:21)	Newman (10:11)	Sanada (10:26)	—N/a	Sanada (14:05)	Tanahashi (2:48)	Tsuji (5:11)	Sanada (11:41)
Taichi	Boltin (12:14)	Evil (10:31)	Taichi (13:35)	Newman (12:50)	Oiwa (11:50)	Sanada (14:05)	—N/a	Tanahashi (20:21)	Taichi (15:58)	Taichi (19:02)
Tanahashi	Boltin (9:50)	Evil (12:50)	Tanahashi (16:02)	Newman (7:32)	Oiwa (14:20)	Tanahashi (2:48)	Tanahashi (20:21)	—N/a	Tanahashi (16:46)	Uemura (18:40)
Tsuji	Tsuji (10:03)	Evil (11:01)	Finlay (15:21)	Tsuji (11:17)	Tsuji (13:43)	Tsuji (5:11)	Taichi (15:58)	Tanahashi (16:46)	—N/a	Tsuji (16:56)
Uemura	Uemura (11:03)	Uemura (13:42)	Finlay (23:01)	Uemura (10:32)	Uemura (18:23)	Sanada (11:41)	Taichi (19:02)	Uemura (18:40)	Tsuji (16:56)	—N/a
Block B	Phantasmo	Kidd	Moloney	Narita	O-Khan	Sabre Jr.	Takagi	Takeshita	Umino	Yoshi-Hashi
Phantasmo	—N/a	Phantasmo (Forfeit)	Phantasmo (5:03)	Narita (9:50)	O-Khan (14:50)	Sabre Jr. (19:20)	Takagi (14:27)	Phantasmo (15:02)	Umino (11:29)	Phantasmo (12:30)
Kidd	Phantasmo (Forfeit)	—N/a	Moloney (Forfeit)	Narita (Forfeit)	O-Khan (Forfeit)	Sabre Jr. (Forfeit)	Takagi (Forfeit)	Takeshita (13:15)	Umino (Forfeit)	Yoshi-Hashi (Forfeit)
Moloney	Phantasmo (5:03)	Moloney (Forfeit)	—N/a	Moloney (9:52)	Moloney (9:08)	Sabre Jr. (14:01)	Takagi (12:06)	Takeshita (14:01)	Moloney (12:30)	Yoshi-Hashi (11:32)
Narita	Narita (9:50)	Narita (Forfeit)	Moloney (9:52)	—N/a	Narita (12:13)	Narita (16:14)	Takagi (17:10)	Takeshita (20:50)	Narita (17:45)	Yoshi-Hashi (1:26)
O-Khan	O-Khan (14:50)	O-Khan (Forfeit)	Moloney (9:08)	Narita (12:13)	—N/a	Sabre Jr. (20:01)	O-Khan (12:12)	Takeshita (17:05)	Umino (12:05)	O-Khan (12:27)
Sabre Jr.	Sabre Jr. (19:20)	Sabre Jr. (Forfeit)	Sabre Jr. (14:01)	Narita (16:14)	Sabre Jr. (20:01)	—N/a	Sabre Jr. (20:53)	Sabre Jr. (22:37)	Umino (22:10)	Sabre Jr. (17:36)
Takagi	Takagi (14:27)	Takagi (Forfeit)	Takagi (12:06)	Takagi (17:10)	O-Khan (12:12)	Sabre Jr. (20:53)	—N/a	Takeshita (23:56)	Takagi (22:45)	Yoshi-Hashi (4:45)
Takeshita	Phantasmo (15:02)	Takeshita (13:15)	Takeshita (14:01)	Takeshita (20:50)	Takeshita (17:05)	Sabre Jr. (22:37)	Takeshita (23:56)	—N/a	Umino (25:46)	Takeshita (15:13)
Umino	Umino (11:29)	Umino (Forfeit)	Moloney (12:30)	Narita (17:45)	Umino (12:05)	Umino (22:10)	Takagi (22:45)	Umino (25:46)	—N/a	Umino (13:30)
Yoshi-Hashi	Phantasmo (12:30)	Yoshi-Hashi (Forfeit)	Yoshi-Hashi (11:32)	Yoshi-Hashi (1:26)	O-Khan (12:27)	Sabre Jr. (17:36)	Yoshi-Hashi (4:45)	Takeshita (15:13)	Umino (13:30)	—N/a

Playoffs; August 14; Korakuen Hall, Tokyo
B2	Shota Umino	28:18
A3	Yota Tsuji	Pin
A2	David Finlay	17:12
B3	Konosuke Takeshita	Pin

Semifinals; August 16; Ariake Arena, Tokyo
A1	Evil	TKO
A3	Yota Tsuji	18:02
B1	Zack Sabre Jr.	26:46
B3	Konosuke Takeshita	Pin

Final; August 17; Ariake Arena, Tokyo
A1	Evil	26:26
B3	Konosuke Takeshita	Pin

=== 2026 ===
Winner of the 2026 G1 Climax, Ryohei Oiwa shown here with the trophy.

The 2026 edition of the G1 Climax was announced on January 4 at Wrestle Kingdom 20 and took place from July 11 until August 16. This tournament marked the debuts of Yuto-Ice, Oskar, and Aaron Wolf. For the second time in NJPW history (and first time in 7 years), the opening night of the tournament took place outside Japan, at the NOW Arena in Hoffman Estates, Illinois. On July 15, 2026, Shota Umino withdrew because of concussion protocols, with all opponents receiving walkover wins.

Final standings
Block A		Block B	
Yota Tsuji	12	Callum Newman	12
Ryohei Oiwa	12	Yuya Uemura	12
Konosuke Takeshita	12	Gabe Kidd	12
Boltin Oleg	10	Ren Narita	10
Sanada	8	Drilla Moloney	10
Hirooki Goto	8	Zack Sabre Jr.	10
Yuto-Ice	8	Henare	8
Shingo Takagi	8	Oskar	8
Jake Lee	6	Aaron Wolf	8
Great-O-Khan	6	Shota Umino (withdrawn)	0

Tournament overview
Block A	Boltin	Goto	O-Khan	Lee	Oiwa	Sanada	Takagi	Takeshita	Tsuji	Ice
Boltin	—N/a	Goto (15:20)	O-Khan (17:30)	Boltin (10:18)	Oiwa (13:28)	Boltin (1:30)	Boltin (19:10)	Takeshita (14:20)	Boltin (24:35)	Boltin (15:01)
Goto	Goto (15:20)	—N/a	O-Khan (10:42)	Lee (9:55)	Oiwa (8:51)	Goto (12:04)	Takagi (16:40)	Takeshita (18:04)	Goto (22:35)	Goto (10:08)
O-Khan	O-Khan (17:30)	O-Khan (10:42)	—N/a	Lee (1:47)	Oiwa (13:27)	O-Khan (11:10)	Takagi (9:56)	Takeshita (14:36)	Tsuji (13:14)	Ice (11:11)
Lee	Boltin (10:18)	Lee (9:55)	Lee (1:47)	—N/a	Oiwa (12:47)	Sanada (13:30)	Lee (10:14)	Takeshita (8:51)	Tsuji (13:58)	Ice (10:37)
Oiwa	Oiwa (13:28)	Oiwa (8:51)	Oiwa (13:27)	Oiwa (12:47)	—N/a	Oiwa (11:48)	Takagi (16:37)	Oiwa (15:11)	Tsuji (19:37)	Ice (15:18)
Sanada	Boltin (1:30)	Goto (12:04)	O-Khan (11:10)	Sanada (13:30)	Oiwa (11:48)	—N/a	Sanada (12:18)	Takeshita (14:02)	Sanada (15:23)	Sanada (8:10)
Takagi	Boltin (19:10)	Takagi (16:38)	Takagi (9:56)	Lee (10:14)	Takagi (16:40)	Sanada (12:18)	—N/a	Takagi (19:44)	Tsuji (24:12)	Ice (20:25)
Takeshita	Takeshita (14:20)	Takeshita (18:04)	Takeshita (14:36)	Takeshita (8:51)	Oiwa (15:11)	Takeshita (14:02)	Takagi (19:44)	—N/a	Tsuji (20:52)	Takeshita (12:04)
Tsuji	Boltin (24:35)	Goto (22:35)	Tsuji (13:14)	Tsuji (13:58)	Tsuji (19:37)	Sanada (15:23)	Tsuji (24:12)	Tsuji (20:52)	—N/a	Tsuji (26:08)
Ice	Boltin (15:01)	Goto (10:08)	Ice (11:11)	Ice (10:37)	Ice (15:18)	Sanada (8:10)	Ice (20:25)	Takeshita (12:04)	Tsuji (26:08)	—N/a
Block B	Henare	Kidd	Moloney	Narita	Newman	Oskar	Sabre	Uemura	Umino	Wolf
Henare	—N/a	Kidd (20:35)	Henare (13:13)	Henare (10:59)	Newman (23:04)	Henare (11:46)	Sabre (15:32)	Uemura (15:06)	Henare (Forfeit)	Wolf (9:01)
Kidd	Kidd (20:35)	—N/a	Moloney (15:46)	Kidd (2:11)	Newman (12:18)	Kidd (7:34)	Kidd (25:47)	Uemura (22:10)	Kidd (Forfeit)	Kidd (9:51)
Moloney	Henare (13:13)	Moloney (15:46)	—N/a	Moloney (11:54)	Moloney (14:12)	Oskar (10:40)	Sabre (18:29)	Moloney (17:48)	Moloney (Forfeit)	Wolf (13:11)
Narita	Henare (10:59)	Kidd (2:11)	Moloney (11:54)	—N/a	Narita (15:30)	Oskar (9:42)	Narita (2:45)	Narita (20:00)	Narita (Forfeit)	Narita (14:01)
Newman	Newman (23:04)	Newman (12:18)	Moloney (14:12)	Narita (15:30)	—N/a	Newman (18:18)	Newman (20:11)	Newman (15:42)	Newman (Forfeit)	Wolf (16:57)
Oskar	Henare (11:46)	Kidd (7:34)	Oskar (10:40)	Oskar (9:42)	Newman (18:18)	—N/a	Sabre (15:58)	Uemura (17:25)	Oskar (Forfeit)	Oskar (9:50)
Sabre	Sabre (15:32)	Kidd (25:47)	Sabre (18:29)	Narita (2:45)	Newman (20:11)	Sabre (15:58)	—N/a	Uemura (25:18)	Sabre (16:10)	Sabre (16:44)
Uemura	Uemura (15:06)	Uemura (22:10)	Moloney (17:48)	Narita (20:00)	Newman (15:42)	Uemura (17:25)	Uemura (25:18)	—N/a	Uemura (Forfeit)	Uemura (19:20)
Umino	Henare (Forfeit)	Kidd (Forfeit)	Moloney (Forfeit)	Narita (Forfeit)	Newman (Forfeit)	Oskar (Forfeit)	Sabre (16:10)	Uemura (Forfeit)	—N/a	Wolf (Forfeit)
Wolf	Wolf (9:01)	Kidd (9:51)	Wolf (13:11)	Narita (14:01)	Wolf (16:57)	Oskar (9:50)	Sabre (16:44)	Uemura (19:20)	Wolf (Forfeit)	—N/a

Semifinals; August 15; Ryogoku Sumo Hall, Tokyo
A1	Yota Tsuji	25:10
B2	Yuya Uemura	Pin
B1	Callum Newman	18:44
A2	Ryohei Oiwa	Pin

Final; August 16; Ryogoku Sumo Hall, Tokyo
B2	Yuya Uemura	35:10
A2	Ryohei Oiwa	Sub

== See also ==
- Continental Classic
- Champion Carnival
- N-1 Victory
- Fire Festival
- Ikkitousen Strong Climb
- D-Oh Grand Prix
- King of Gate
- 5Star Grand Prix
