= Destruction '07 =

2007 Japanese wrestling event

- Promotion: New Japan Pro-Wrestling
- Date: November 11, 2007
- City: Tokyo, Japan
- Venue: Ryōgoku Kokugikan
- Attendance: 6,500

New Japan Pro-Wrestling events chronology
← Previous; Wrestle Kingdom I	Next → Wrestle Kingdom II

Destruction chronology
← Previous; First	Next → '08

Destruction '07 was a professional wrestling television special event promoted by New Japan Pro-Wrestling (NJPW). The event took place on November 11, 2007, in Tokyo, at Ryōgoku Kokugikan.

The event featured nine matches, two of which were contested for championships. The event featured outside participants from American promotion Total Nonstop Action Wrestling (TNA). It was the first event under the Destruction name.

== Production ==
=== Storylines ===
Destruction '07 featured nine professional wrestling matches that involved different wrestlers from pre-existing scripted feuds and storylines. Wrestlers portrayed villains, heroes, or less distinguishable characters in the scripted events that built tension and culminated in a wrestling match or series of matches.

== Event ==
The event featured outside participants from American promotion Total Nonstop Action Wrestling (TNA), with whom NJPW had a working relationship at the time. In addition to Christopher Daniels, Rhino and Senshi, Ron Killings was also scheduled to wrestle at the event, but did not make the event. The event saw Shinsuke Nakamura make his return to the ring after a shoulder injury, which had sidelined him since the previous August. During the event, Dick Togo and Taka Michinoku successfully defended the IWGP Junior Heavyweight Tag Team Championship against former four-time champions, Gedo and Jado, and Hiroshi Tanahashi successfully defended the IWGP Heavyweight Championship against Hirooki Goto.

== Results ==
No.	Results	Stipulations	Times
1	Koji Kanemoto and Wataru Inoue defeated Ryusuke Taguchi and Yujiro	Tag team match	06:40
2	Togi Makabe defeated Milano Collection A.T.	Singles match	09:39
3	Tiger Mask defeated Ron Killings via forfeit	Singles match	—
4	Bono Tiger and Tiger Mask defeated G.B.H. (Tomoaki Honma and Tomohiro Ishii)	Tag team match	06:20
5	Triple X (Christopher Daniels and Senshi) defeated RISE (Minoru and Prince Devitt)	Tag team match	17:23
6	Rhino defeated Toru Yano	Singles match	09:18
7	Legend (Akira, Jyushin Thunder Liger, Masahiro Chono, Riki Choshu and Super Strong Machine) defeated Mitsuhide Hirasawa, Taichi Ishikari, Takashi Iizuka, Takashi Uwano and Tetsuya Naito	Ten-man tag team match	08:21
8	Dick Togo and Taka Michinoku (c) defeated Gedo and Jado	Tag team match for the IWGP Junior Heavyweight Tag Team Championship	20:16
9	RISE (Giant Bernard and Shinsuke Nakamura) defeated Manabu Nakanishi and Yuji Nagata	Tag team match	16:45
10	Hiroshi Tanahashi (c) defeated Hirooki Goto by submission	Singles match for the IWGP Heavyweight Championship	31:32
(c) / – the champion(s) heading into the match
