= Destruction '08 =

Professional wrestling pay per view event promoted by NJPW

- Promotion: New Japan Pro-Wrestling
- Date: October 13, 2008
- City: Tokyo, Japan
- Venue: Ryōgoku Kokugikan
- Attendance: 9,000

Pay-per-view chronology
← Previous; G1 Climax	Next → Wrestle Kingdom III in Tokyo Dome

Destruction chronology
← Previous '07	Next → '09

New Japan Pro-Wrestling events chronology
← Previous; Wrestle Kingdom II	Next → Wrestle Kingdom III

Destruction '08 was a professional wrestling pay-per-view (PPV) event promoted by New Japan Pro-Wrestling (NJPW). The event took place on October 13, 2008, in Tokyo, at Ryōgoku Kokugikan.

The event featured nine matches (including one dark match), three of which were contested for championships. All Japan Pro Wrestling representatives Hiroshi Yamato, Kai and Satoshi Kojima, as well as the reigning IWGP Heavyweight Champion Keiji Mutoh, took part in the event as outsiders. It was the second event under the Destruction name.

== Production ==
=== Storylines ===
Destruction '08 featured nine professional wrestling matches that involved different wrestlers from pre-existing scripted feuds and storylines. Wrestlers portrayed villains, heroes, or less distinguishable characters in the scripted events that built tension and culminated in a wrestling match or series of matches.

== Event ==
During the event, No Limit (Tetsuya Naito and Yujiro) won the IWGP Junior Heavyweight Tag Team Championship for the first time by defeating Prince Prince (Minoru and Prince Devitt), while Pro Wrestling Zero1's Masato Tanaka lost the World Heavyweight Championship to Yuji Nagata, ending his year-long reign. In the main event, Keiji Mutoh made his fourth successful defense of the IWGP Heavyweight Championship against Shinsuke Nakamura.

== Results ==
No.	Results	Stipulations	Times
1^{D}	Ryusuke Taguchi and Wataru Inoue defeated Unione (Milano Collection A.T. and Taichi)	Tag team match	07:04
2	No Limit (Tetsuya Naito and Yujiro) defeated Prince Prince (Minoru and Prince Devitt) (c)	Tag team match for the IWGP Junior Heavyweight Tag Team Championship	11:34
3	G.B.H. (Gedo, Jado and Low Ki) defeated Jyushin Thunder Liger, Koji Kanemoto and Tiger Mask	Six-man tag team match	07:46
4	G.B.H. (Togi Makabe, Tomohiro Ishii and Toru Yano) defeated F4 (Hiroshi Yamato, Kai and Satoshi Kojima)	Six-man tag team match	10:06
5	Manabu Nakanishi and Yutaka Yoshie defeated Hiroshi Tanahashi and Masahiro Chono	Tag team match	10:24
6	Giant Bernard defeated Hirooki Goto	Singles match	13:44
7	Takashi Iizuka defeated Hiroyoshi Tenzan	Chain Deathmatch	21:24
8	Yuji Nagata defeated Masato Tanaka (c)	Singles match for the Zero1 World Heavyweight Championship	18:06
9	Keiji Mutoh (c) defeated Shinsuke Nakamura	Singles match for the IWGP Heavyweight Championship	21:39
(c) / – the champion(s) heading into the match; D / – this was a dark match
