= Wrestle Kingdom II =

2008 New Japan Pro-Wrestling pay-per-view event

- Promotional poster for the event, featuring Kurt Angle and Yuji Nagata
- Promotion: New Japan Pro-Wrestling
- Date: January 4, 2008
- City: Tokyo, Japan
- Venue: Tokyo Dome
- Attendance: 27,000
- Tagline: U.S.A. vs. Japan

Pay-per-view chronology
← Previous; G1 Climax	Next → Circuit New Japan Ism

Wrestle Kingdom chronology
← Previous; I	Next → III

New Japan Pro-Wrestling events chronology
← Previous; Destruction '07	Next → Destruction '08

Wrestle Kingdom II in Tokyo Dome (レッスルキングダムII in 東京ドーム, Ressuru Kingudamu II in Tōkyō Dōmu) was a professional wrestling pay-per-view (PPV) event produced by the New Japan Pro-Wrestling (NJPW) promotion, which took place at the Tokyo Dome in Tokyo, Japan on January 4, 2008. It was the 17th January 4 Tokyo Dome Show and the second held under the "Wrestle Kingdom" name. The event featured ten matches, four of which were contested for championships.

As part of a new working relationship, the show featured wrestlers from the Nashville, Tennessee-based Total Nonstop Action Wrestling (TNA) promotion. The matches involving TNA wrestlers were shown as a special Global Impact! broadcast in the United States on Spike TV on January 17, 2008. TNA wrestlers were involved in six of the ten matches, which included Kurt Angle making a successful defense of the Inoki Genome Federation's version of the IWGP Heavyweight Championship (known as the IWGP 3rd Belt Championship in NJPW) against Yuji Nagata. The show also featured wrestlers from All Japan Pro Wrestling (AJPW), Dradition and Pro Wrestling Zero1-Max.

== Storylines ==
Wrestle Kingdom II featured ten professional wrestling matches that involved different wrestlers from pre-existing scripted feuds and storylines. Wrestlers portrayed villains, heroes, or less distinguishable characters in the scripted events that built tension and culminated in a wrestling match or series of matches.

Through NJPW's relationship with the American Total Nonstop Action Wrestling (TNA), the event featured several TNA wrestlers, headlined by Kurt Angle, who was in possession of the "IWGP 3rd Belt Championship". In October 2005, Brock Lesnar won NJPW's top title, the IWGP Heavyweight Championship. The following July, he refused to return and defend the title, claiming he was owed money. NJPW stripped Lesnar of the title and went on to crown a new champion, who was given the older second generation IWGP Heavyweight Championship title belt, while Lesnar retained physical possession of the third generation belt. In June 2007, Lesnar returned to Japan with the title belt, announcing he was going to defend it at Inoki Genome Federation's debut show in Tokyo's Sumo Hall. Lesnar went on to lose the title to TNA wrestler Kurt Angle. On November 17, NJPW announced that Angle, whom they dubbed "IWGP 3rd Belt Champion", would take part in the January 4 Tokyo Dome show, where he would defend his title against NJPW wrestler Yuji Nagata.

After announcing Angle's participation in the event, NJPW announced that the entire Wrestle Kingdom II show would have a "NJPW vs. TNA" theme with six matches pitting wrestlers from the two companies against each other.

== Event ==
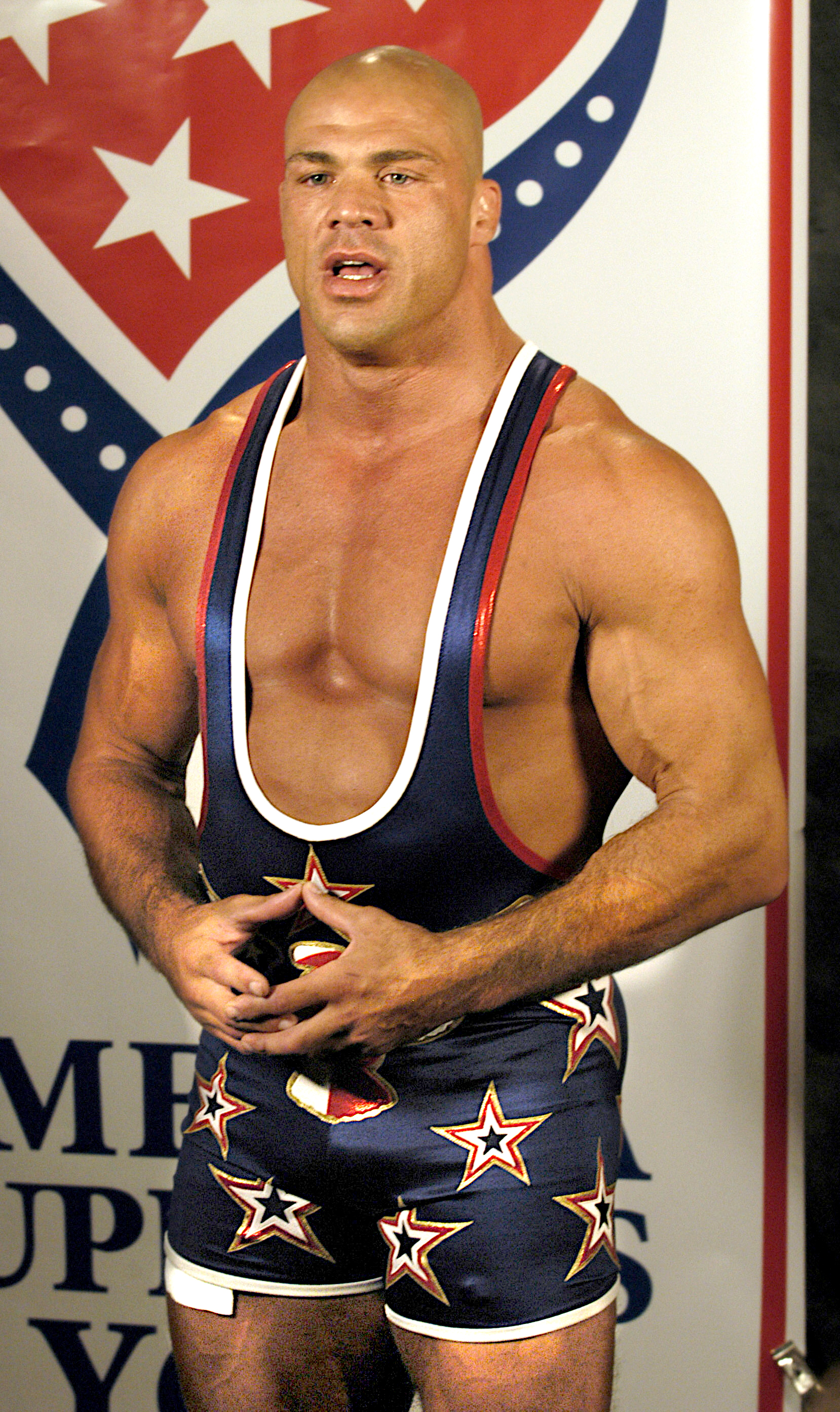
Kurt Angle, who defended the "IWGP 3rd Belt Championship" at the event

In the main event of the show, Shinsuke Nakamura defeated Hiroshi Tanahashi to capture the IWGP Heavyweight Championship for the first time in four years. In the semi-main event, TNA representative Kurt Angle successfully defended the "IWGP 3rd Belt Championship" against Yuji Nagata. Following the main event, Angle confronted Nakamura, setting up a championship unification match between the two.

The opening match of the show was the first of the six "NJPW vs. TNA" matches on the show and saw TNA's A.J. Styles, Christian Cage and Petey Williams defeat NJPW's Milano Collection A.T., Minoru and Prince Devitt. In the second match, NJPW's Wataru Inoue made his first successful defense of the IWGP Junior Heavyweight Championship against TNA's Christopher Daniels. The next match saw NJPW's Manabu Nakanishi defeat TNA's Abyss. The fifth match of the show was contested under hardcore rules and saw TNA's Team 3D (Brother Devon and Brother Ray) defeat NJPW's Togi Makabe and Toru Yano to tie the series.

Prior to the IWGP Tag Team Championship match between champions, NJPW representatives Giant Bernard and Travis Tomko, and challengers, TNA representatives The Steiner Brothers (Rick and Scott), TNA founder Jeff Jarrett entered the ring to talk about the relationship between the two companies. He then sat ringside with NJPW president Naoki Sugabayashi for the next match. Towards the end of the match, Jarrett went to interfere and hit Bernard with a guitar, but was stopped by Togi Makabe and Toru Yano. While Jarrett was busy hitting Yano with his guitar, Bernard and Tomko won the match after pinning Rick with their Magic Killer finisher. With Angle's win over Nagata, the series between NJPW and TNA ended tied 3–3.

In addition to the TNA wrestlers, the event also featured other outside participants. All Japan Pro Wrestling (AJPW) performer Keiji Mutoh wrestled his first NJPW match under his masked alter ego "The Great Muta" in seven years and eight months, defeating NJPW's Hirooki Goto. In addition, wrestlers from Dradition and Pro Wrestling Zero1-Max took part in a ten-man tag team match, where veteran wrestler Tatsumi Fujinami picked up the win.

== Reception ==
Following Wrestle Kingdom II, Dave Meltzer of the Wrestling Observer Newsletter saw NJPW's annual January 4 Tokyo Dome show "hovering on extinction". While NJPW announced an attendance of 27,000, Meltzer claimed a real attendance of 20,000 with roughly half paid. According to Meltzer "nobody could reasonably expect much more than 10,000 paid for New Japan, so by modern standards getting the place packed and having a good show up-and-down is considered a success". According to Meltzer, NJPW was happy with "how things went with TNA" with the company's management feeling that the American promotion had "plenty of good workers". In addition to the bigger name wrestlers such as Kurt Angle, Team 3D and The Steiner Brothers, A.J. Styles and Petey Williams were said to have impressed Japanese fans.

== Aftermath ==
On February 17, 2008, Shinsuke Nakamura defeated Kurt Angle to unify the two versions of the IWGP Heavyweight Championship. Afterwards, both the second and third generation title belts were retired with Nakamura being awarded a brand new belt to represent the IWGP Heavyweight Championship. The fourth generation belt was created to symbolically end the issues surrounding the championship and start a new one. This belt would continued to be used until its unification with the IWGP Intercontinental Championship to form the IWGP World Heavyweight Championship in February of 2021.

== Results ==
No.	Results	Stipulations	Times
1	A.J. Styles, Christian Cage and Petey Williams defeated RISE (Milano Collection A.T., Minoru and Prince Devitt)	Six-man tag team match	10:25
2	Wataru Inoue (c) defeated Christopher Daniels	Singles match for the IWGP Junior Heavyweight Championship	10:17
3	Manabu Nakanishi defeated Abyss	Singles match	06:00
4	Katsushi Takemura, Masato Tanaka, Tatsuhito Takaiwa and Yutaka Yoshie defeated Koji Kanemoto, Ryusuke Taguchi, Takashi Iizuka and Tiger Mask	Eight-man tag team match	08:36
5	Team 3D (Brother Devon and Brother Ray) defeated G.B.H. (Togi Makabe and Toru Yano) (with Tomoaki Honma and Tomohiro Ishii)	Hardcore match	13:12
6	Legend (Akira, Jyushin Thunder Liger, Masahiro Chono, Riki Choshu and Tatsumi Fujinami) defeated V.B.H. ("brother" Yasshi, Gedo, Jado, Shuji Kondo and Taru)	Ten-man tag team match	07:18
7	The Great Muta defeated Hirooki Goto	Singles match	13:04
8	Giant Bernard and Travis Tomko (c) defeated The Steiner Brothers (Rick Steiner and Scott Steiner)	Tag team match for the IWGP Tag Team Championship	12:50
9	Kurt Angle (c) defeated Yuji Nagata	Singles match for the IWGP 3rd Belt Championship	18:29
10	Shinsuke Nakamura defeated Hiroshi Tanahashi (c)	Singles match for the IWGP Heavyweight Championship	23:08
(c) / – the champion(s) heading into the match

== See also ==
- TNA Global Impact!
