= Destruction (2023) =

2023 New Japan Pro-Wrestling event series

- Promotional poster for the October 9 event
- Promotion: New Japan Pro-Wrestling
- Date: September 24, 2023; October 9, 2023
- City: Kobe, Japan; Tokyo, Japan
- Venue: Kobe World Memorial Hall; Ryōgoku Kokugikan
- Attendance: Night 1 (4,212); Night 2 (5,002)

Event chronology
← Previous; Multiverse United 2 Road to Destruction	Next → Royal Quest III

Destruction chronology
← Previous; 2019	Next → 2024

Destruction (2023) was a series of professional wrestling events promoted by New Japan Pro-Wrestling (NJPW) in 2023: Destruction in Kobe on September 24, and Destruction in Ryōgoku on October 9. These are events twenty-four to twenty-five in the Destruction chronology.

== Production ==
=== Background ===
After taking a hiatus from 2020 to 2022, Destruction had two events taking place in late September and early October 2023. This was also be the first time since Destruction '11 that a Destruction event was held at Ryōgoku Kokugikan.

=== Storylines ===
The two Destruction events featured professional wrestling matches each that involved different wrestlers from pre-existing scripted feuds and storylines. Wrestlers portrayed villains, heroes, or less distinguishable characters in the scripted events that built tension and culminated in a wrestling match or series of matches.

== Night 1 ==
=== Event ===
The first night of the event from September 24 started with two preshow bouts broadcast live on NJPW's YouTube channel. In the first one, Clark Connors and Drilla Moloney defeated Kevin Knight and Tiger Mask in a non-title match, and in the second one, Sanada, Douki and Yoshinobu Kanemaru picked up a victory over Dick Togo, Evil and Yujiro Takahashi in six-man tag team action.

On the first main card confrontation, El Phantasmo, Hikuleo, Tama Tonga, Tanga Loa and Jado outmatched Alex Coughlin, Chase Owens, David Finlay, Gabe Kidd and Gedo in ten-man tag team action. Next up, Lio Rush and Yoh defeated Bushi and Hiromu Takahashi, ahead of Rush's and Takahashi's IWGP Junior Heavyweight Championship match. Next, Bad Dude Tito and Zack Sabre Jr. picked up a victory over two thirds of the NEVER Openweight 6-Man Tag Team Champions Kazuchika Okada and Tomohiro Ishii. On the sixth match, Sho defeated Taichi to become the Provisional KOPW Champion of 2023. Yoshinobu Kanemaru defected Just 5 Guys to join House of Torture. Next, Hirooki Goto and Yoshi-Hashi defeated Mikey Nicholls and Shane Haste to secure the second consecutive defense of the IWGP Tag Team Championship in that respective reign. Next up, Shingo Takagi defeated Great-O-Khan in singles competition. In the semi main event, Tetsuya Naito defeated Jeff Cobb to retain the Tokyo Dome IWGP World Heavyweight Championship challenge rights certificate.

In the main event, Will Ospreay defeated Yota Tsuji to retain the IWGP United States Heavyweight Championship for the first time in that respective reign. After the bout concluded, NJPW World Television Champion Zack Sabre Jr. joined Ospreay in the ring ahead of their collision at Royal Quest III.

Kobe
No.	Results	Stipulations	Times
1^{P}	Bullet Club War Dogs (Drilla Moloney and Clark Connors) defeated Tiger Mask and Kevin Knight	Tag team match	6:57
2	Just 5 Guys (Sanada, Douki and Taka Michinoku) defeated House of Torture (Dick Togo, Evil and Yujiro Takahashi)	Six-man tag team match	8:32
3	Guerillas of Destiny (El Phantasmo, Hikuleo, Jado, Tanga Loa, and Tama Tonga) defeated Bullet Club War Dogs (Gedo, Alex Coughlin, Chase Owens, David Finlay, Gabe Kidd)	Ten-man tag team match	10:12
4	LiYoh (Yoh and Lio Rush) defeated Los Ingobernables de Japon (Bushi and Hiromu Takahashi)	Tag team match	9:14
5	TMDK (Bad Dude Tito and Zack Sabre Jr.) defeated Chaos (Tomohiro Ishii and Kazuchika Okada)	Tag team match	12:15
6	Sho defeated Taichi (c)	Singles match for the Provisional KOPW Championship (Note: Before the match began, Dick Togo, Taka Michinoku, Yujiro Takahashi, Douki, Evil and Sanada were handcuffed to each other.)	13:01
7	Bishamon (Hirooki Goto and Yoshi-Hashi) (c) defeated TMDK (Shane Haste and Mikey Nicholls)	Tag team match for the IWGP Tag Team Championship	12:29
8	Shingo Takagi defeated Great-O-Khan (with Callum Newman)	Singles match	11:27
9	Tetsuya Naito (certificate holder) defeated Jeff Cobb	Singles match for the Tokyo Dome IWGP World Heavyweight Championship challenge rights certificate	14:17
10	Will Ospreay (c) defeated Yota Tsuji	Singles match for the IWGP United Kingdom Heavyweight Championship (Note: Despite Ospreay renaming the title to IWGP United Kingdom Heavyweight Championship, the match is listed as a IWGP United States Heavyweight Championship title match by NJPW)	27:51
(c) / – the champion(s) heading into the match; P / – the match was broadcast on the pre-show

== Night 2 ==
=== Event ===
The night started with the ten-man tag team match confrontation between NJPW natives Yoshi-Hashi, Toru Yano, Yoh, Tiger Mask and Ryusuke Taguchi, and DDT Pro-Wrestling's Takeshi Masada and Kazuma Sumi, Kengo and Pro Wrestling Freedoms' Takahiro Katori and Jun Masaoka. The NJPW natives team picked up the victory after Taguchi pinned Katori. Due to Masada being the time's Ironman Heavymetalweight Champion, Yano and Taguchi tried to pin him multiple times but were unsuccessful as Masada held on to his title because otherwise he would have got fired by DDT.

In the first main card bout, Just 5 Guys presented Yuya Uemura as their newest member after he concluded his foreign excursion. He alongside new stablemates Taichi and Douki defeated Yujiro Takahashi, Sho and Yoshinobu Kanemaru. Next up, Tanga Loa defeated Chase Owens in singles competition. Next up, Tetsuya Naito, Shingo Takagi, Yota Tsuji and Bushi defeated Great-O-Khan, Jeff Cobb, Henare and Callum Newman in eight-man tag team action. Next up, Clark Connors and Drilla Moloney defeated Kevin Knight and Kushida to retain the IWGP Junior Heavyweight Tag Team Championship for the second time consecutively in that respective reign. Next up, Master Wato, Shota Umino and Yuji Nagata defeated Minoru Suzuki, El Desperado and Ren Narita in six-man tag team action. Next up, Hikuleo and El Phantasmo defeated Gabe Kidd and Alex Coughlin to win the Strong Openweight Tag Team Championship, ending the champions' reign on their very first defense. In the eighth bout, Kazuchika Okada and Tomohiro Ishii) and Hiroshi Tanahashi defeated Impact World Champion Alex Shelley, Impact X Division Champion Chris Sabin and Josh Alexander to retain the NEVER Openweight 6-Man Tag Team Championship for the third time consecutively in that respective reign. Next up, Tama Tonga defeated David Finlay to win the NEVER Openweight Championship in a match which continued both of the wrestler's feud at the time. In the semi main event, Hiromu Takahashi defeated Yoh and Mike Bailey to secure the sixth consecutive defense of the IWGP Junior Heavyweight Championship in that respective reign. After the bout concluded, Taiji Ishimori returned from an injury and laid a title challenge for Takahashi.

In the main event, Sanada defeated Evil to secure the fourth consecutive defense of the IWGP World Heavyweight Championship in that respective reign. After the bout concluded, G1 Climax 33 winner Tetsuya Naito stepped up to remind Sanada of their scheduled match for Wrestle Kingdom 18.

Ryōgoku
No.	Results	Stipulations	Times
1^{P}	Chaos (Yoshi-Hashi, Toru Yano and Yoh), Tiger Mask and Ryusuke Taguchi defeated Takahiro Katori, Takeshi Masada, Kazuma Sumi, Kengo, and Jun Masaoka by submission	Ten-man tag team match	8:14
2	Just 5 Guys (Taichi, Douki and Yuya Uemura) (with Taka Michinoku) defeated House of Torture (Yujiro Takahashi, Sho and Yoshinobu Kanemaru) (with Dick Togo) by pinfall	Six-man tag team match	7:57
3	Tanga Loa (with Jado) defeated Chase Owens (with Gedo)	Singles match	8:05
4	Los Ingobernables de Japon (Shingo Takagi, Yota Tsuji, Bushi and Tetsuya Naito) defeated United Empire (Callum Newman, Great-O-Khan, Jeff Cobb, and Henare) by pinfall	Eight-man tag team match	7:44
5	Bullet Club War Dogs (Drilla Moloney and Clark Connors) (c) defeated Intergalactic Jet Setters (Kevin Knight and Kushida) by pinfall	Tag team match for the IWGP Junior Heavyweight Tag Team Championship	13:28
6	Master Wato, Yuji Nagata, and Shota Umino defeated Strong Style (Ren Narita, Minoru Suzuki, and El Desperado by pinfall	Six-man tag team match Match seven in a Best of Seven Series (Series tied 3-3-1)	14:10
7	Guerillas of Destiny (Hikuleo and El Phantasmo) (with Jado) defeated Bullet Club War Dogs (Alex Coughlin and Gabe Kidd) (c) by pinfall	Tag team match for the Strong Openweight Tag Team Championship	13:12
8	Chaos (Kazuchika Okada and Tomohiro Ishii) and Hiroshi Tanahashi) (c) defeated The Motor City Machine Guns (Alex Shelley and Chris Sabin) and Josh Alexander by pinfall	Six-man tag team match for the NEVER Openweight 6-Man Tag Team Championship	15:40
9	Tama Tonga (with Jado) defeated David Finlay (c) (with Gedo) by pinfall	Singles match for the NEVER Openweight Championship	19:39
10	Hiromu Takahashi (c) defeated Yoh (Note: Lio Rush was originally scheduled to compete in the match, but pulled out due to getting sick. Thus, Yoh took his place in the match) and Mike Bailey by pinfall	Three-way match for the IWGP Junior Heavyweight Championship	17:53
11	Sanada (c) defeated Evil by pinfall	Lumberjack match for the IWGP World Heavyweight Championship; The lumberjacks consisted of the members of both Just 5 Guys and House of Torture.	28:01
(c) / – the champion(s) heading into the match; P / – the match was broadcast on the pre-show
