= No Limit (professional wrestling) =

Professional wrestling tag team

Tag team
- Members: Tetsuya Naito/Naito; Yujiro/Yujiro Takahashi
- Name(s): No Limit; Takahashi-gumi
- Billed heights: Naito: 1.80 m (5 ft 11 in); Takahashi: 1.77 m (5 ft 9 1/2 in)
- Combined billed weight: (as junior heavyweights) 194 kg (428 lb) (as heavyweights) 207 kg (456 lb)
- Debut: February 17, 2008
- Disbanded: May 26, 2011
- Years active: 2008–2011

No Limit (ノー・リミット, Nō Rimitto) was the professional wrestling tag team of Tetsuya Naito and Yujiro Takahashi. The team formed in early 2008, working in their home promotion New Japan Pro-Wrestling's (NJPW) junior heavyweight division, where they later in the year captured the IWGP Junior Heavyweight Tag Team Championship. For most of 2009, through NJPW's foreign relationships, No Limit worked for promotions in the United States and Mexico, most notably Total Nonstop Action Wrestling (TNA) and Consejo Mundial de Lucha Libre (CMLL), before returning to NJPW at the start of 2010. Now working as a heavyweight tag team, the team captured the IWGP Tag Team Championship shortly thereafter, becoming the first tag team to have held both the junior heavyweight and heavyweight versions of NJPW's tag team championship. Naito and Takahashi broke up in May 2011 and afterwards entered a storyline rivalry with each other.

== History ==
=== Formation (2008) ===
On February 17, 2008, Legend (Akira and Jyushin Thunder Liger) defeated Prince Prince (Minoru and Prince Devitt) to capture the IWGP Junior Heavyweight Tag Team Championship. Post-match, Tetsuya Naito and Yujiro entered the ring to nominate themselves as the first challengers of the new champions, dubbing themselves "No Limit" in the process. Naito and Yujiro were at the time relatively unestablished up-and-comers, who had wrestled some tag team matches together in 2007, but did not start teaming regularly until February 2008. After getting their team name, No Limit wrestled their first match together on March 15, defeating Karl Anderson and Mitsuhide Hirasawa. No Limit received their shot at the IWGP Junior Heavyweight Tag Team Championship on April 13, but were defeated by Legend. Despite the loss, both Naito and Yujiro proclaimed that they were in the title picture to stay. In May, No Limit was put in their own match series, titled "No Limit Generation Smash", but lost all five of their matches.

=== Junior heavyweight champions (2008–2009) ===
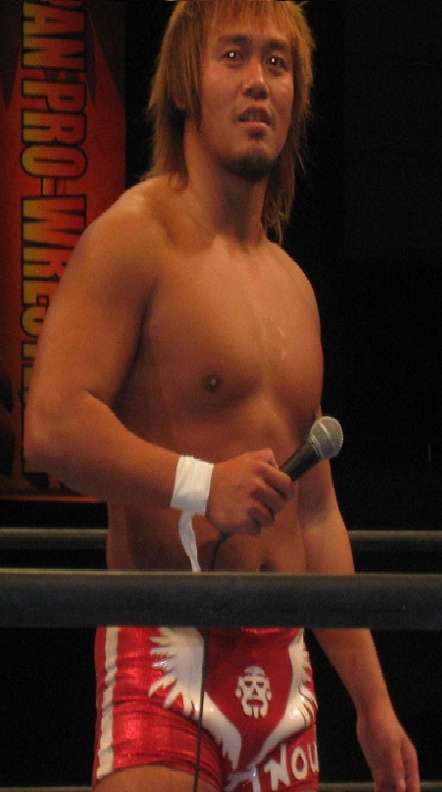
Tetsuya Naito

On September 6, 2008, No Limit made their debut for the Pro Wrestling Noah promotion to make a challenge for the GHC Junior Heavyweight Tag Team Championship. They received their title shot on September 27, but were defeated by Kotaro Suzuki and Yoshinobu Kanemaru. Also in September, No Limit took part in American promotion Ring of Honor's event in Tokyo, where they defeated Genba Hirayanagi and Kotaro Suzuki in the opening match. Meanwhile, back in NJPW, No Limit went on a win streak over teams like Mitsuhide Hirasawa and Taichi Ishikari, Kazuchika Okada and Nobuo Yoshihashi, Jyushin Liger and Yoshihashi, and Ishikari and Ryusuke Taguchi, which culminated in them defeating Prince Prince on October 13 at Destruction '08 to win the IWGP Junior Heavyweight Tag Team Championship for the first time in their second title challenge. Later in the month, No Limit took part in their first G1 Tag League, where they finished with a record of two wins and three losses, failing to advance from their round-robin block. One of the losses against Gedo and Jado led to a rematch, No Limit's first IWGP Junior Heavyweight Tag Team Championship defense, on December 7. Accompanied by NJPW Hall of Famer Kantaro Hoshino, No Limit retained their title, after Hoshino prevented the challengers from cheating. No Limit's title reign ended in their second defense on January 4, 2009, at Wrestle Kingdom III in Tokyo Dome, where they were defeated by The Motor City Machine Guns (Alex Shelley and Chris Sabin), representing the American Total Nonstop Action Wrestling (TNA) promotion.

=== Foreign excursion (2009) ===
On February 15, 2009, No Limit defeated Gedo and Jado, Prince Devitt and Ryusuke Taguchi and Unione (Milano Collection A.T. and Taichi Ishikari) in a four-way match to earn a trip to TNA to challenge The Motor City Machine Guns for the IWGP Junior Heavyweight Tag Team Championship. No Limit received their title shot on March 31 in Orlando, Florida, but were again defeated by The Motor City Machine Guns. No Limit remained in TNA for the next two months, during which they also trained at Team 3D's local dojo. During their foreign excursion, Naito worked under only his family name, while Yujiro continued working under his given name. During their stay in TNA, Naito and Yujiro worked several house shows with the promotion, while also being featured on the Impact! television program in a short-lived foreigner alliance with compatriot Kiyoshi and Sheik Abdul Bashir. Before the end of their stay, No Limit received another shot at the IWGP Junior Heavyweight Tag Team Championship on April 19 at Lockdown, but were defeated by The Motor City Machine Guns in a three-way steel cage match, also involving The Latin American Xchange (Hernandez and Homicide). No Limit's final appearance for TNA took place on the May 14 Impact, where they were defeated by Kevin Nash in a two-on-one handicap match.

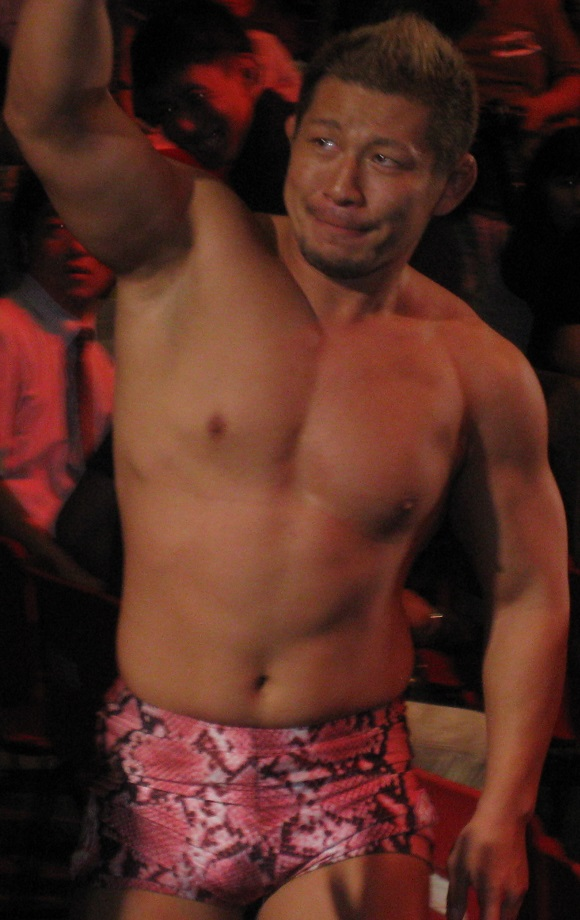
Yujiro Takahashi

After leaving the United States, No Limit traveled to Mexico to work with another one of NJPW's affiliate promotions, Consejo Mundial de Lucha Libre (CMLL). They made their CMLL debut on May 29 and remained with the promotion until the end of the year. During their stay in CMLL, No Limit aligned themselves with Okumura as part of the La Ola Amarilla ("The Yellow Wave") stable. No Limit's first big CMLL match took place on July 31 at Infierno en el Ring, where both members took part in a Hair vs. Hair steel cage match. Naito was the last person to escape the cage, winning the match and forcing Toscano to have his head shaved. At CMLL's 76th Anniversary Show on September 18, No Limit and Okumura teamed with the visiting Jyushin Liger in a "Mexico vs. Japan" eight-man tag team match, where they defeated Atlantis, Black Warrior, Héctor Garza and Último Guerrero. No Limit's run of victories continued later that month at the Gran Alternativa 2009 tag team tournament, which Yujiro won alongside Okumura and the following month in a Hair vs. Hair match, where Yujiro defeated Black Warrior, forcing him to have his head shaved. No Limit's stay in CMLL culminated in their first big loss on December 4 at Sin Salida, where they were defeated by El Terrible and El Texano Jr. in a Hair vs. Hair match and were, as a result, forced to have their heads shaved. The following day, NJPW announced that No Limit's foreign excursion was over and that they were returning to their home promotion.

=== Heavyweight champions (2010) ===
Upon their return to NJPW, Naito and Yujiro transitioned from being junior heavyweights to being heavyweights, citing their successes working with heavyweight wrestlers in Mexico as a reason. Their return match took place on January 4, 2010, at Wrestle Kingdom IV in Tokyo Dome, where they defeated Team 3D and Bad Intentions (Giant Bernard and Karl Anderson) in a three-way hardcore match to capture the former's IWGP Tag Team Championship. During the match, Naito and Yujiro portrayed new villainous characters, stealing the winning pinfall from Team 3D. In victory, No Limit became the first ever team to have held both the junior heavyweight and heavyweight IWGP Tag Team Championships. Instantly after their win, No Limit offered a title match to their CMLL rival team of El Terrible and El Texano Jr. The title match between the two teams took place on February 14 and saw No Limit make their first successful defense through more cheating. Shortly thereafter, Yujiro began working under his full real name of Yujiro Takahashi. No Limit's villainous turn was completed on April 4, when they joined the Chaos stable by turning on Hiroshi Tanahashi in conjunction with Chaos' Toru Yano turning on stablemate Karl Anderson, and essentially took over Bad Intentions' spot as Chaos' chosen tag team. The betrayal led to a storyline rivalry between not only No Limit and Bad Intentions, but also No Limit and Yuji Nagata's Seigigun stable. On May 3 at Wrestling Dontaku 2010, No Limit, Bad Intentions and Seigigun's Yuji Nagata and Wataru Inoue faced off in a three-way match, where Inoue pinned Anderson to capture No Limit's IWGP Tag Team Championship. A rematch under elimination rules took place on June 19 at Dominion 6.19, where Bad Intentions captured the IWGP Tag Team Championship. A third and final three-way match took place on July 19 and saw Bad Intentions again emerge victorious, making their first successful defense of the IWGP Tag Team Championship. In October, No Limit took part in the 2010 G1 Tag League, where they advanced from their round-robin block with a record of three wins and two losses. On November 7, No Limit defeated Muscle Orchestra (Manabu Nakanishi and Strong Man) in the semifinals to advance to the finals of the tournament, where, later that same day, they were defeated by Nagata and Inoue.

=== Dissolution and aftermath (2011–2013) ===
In early 2011, Naito began breaking out as a singles wrestler, most notably challenging Jeff Hardy for the TNA World Heavyweight Championship at Wrestle Kingdom V in Tokyo Dome, which led to a storyline rift between him and Takahashi. However, on March 19, Naito and Takahashi seemingly made peace with each other and agreed to once more go after the IWGP Tag Team Championship, defeating Hiroyoshi Tenzan and Wataru Inoue on April 19 to become the new number one contenders. On May 3 at Wrestling Dontaku 2011, No Limit failed in their attempt to recapture the title from Bad Intentions, after which an angered Takahashi stormed backstage, leaving Naito behind him in the ring. No Limit was finally broken up on May 26, when Takahashi turned on Naito, attacking him with Chaos stablemates Gedo, Jado and Masato Tanaka. Takahashi declared No Limit dead, before revealing that he was now the fourth member of Gedo, Jado and Tanaka's Chaos sub-group Complete Players.

The two former members of No Limit had their first singles match against each other on June 18 at Dominion 6.18, where Takahashi was victorious. The two had a rematch on August 1 during the first day of the 2011 G1 Climax, where Takahashi was once again victorious. A third match between the two took place on September 19 and saw Naito pick up the win. Naito gained another measure of revenge on not only Takahashi, but also Masato Tanaka in the 2011 G1 Tag League in October, when he and Tomoaki Honma defeated Takahashi and Tanaka, costing them a spot in the semifinals of the tournament. When Naito suffered a legitimate knee injury in mid-2012, NJPW introduced a storyline, where Takahashi defeated Naito on October 8 at King of Pro-Wrestling via referee stoppage, after causing further damage to his knee. In storyline, Takahashi was blamed for Naito requiring surgery to his knee. Naito returned from his injury on June 22, 2013, defeating Takahashi in a grudge match at Dominion 6.22. Afterwards, Naito's singles career took off with him first winning the 2013 G1 Climax and then defeating Masato Tanaka for the NEVER Openweight Championship. On October 14 at King of Pro-Wrestling, Naito successfully defended not only his title, but also his status as the number one contender to the IWGP Heavyweight Championship against Takahashi. Since then Naito and Takahashi have remained largely separated from one another, though their rivalry is sporadically brought up.

== Championships and accomplishments ==
- Consejo Mundial de Lucha Libre
  - Torneo Gran Alternativa (2009) – Yujiro with Okumura
- New Japan Pro-Wrestling
  - IWGP Junior Heavyweight Tag Team Championship (1 time)
  - IWGP Tag Team Championship (1 time)
