= Wrestle Kingdom I =

2007 Japanese professional wrestling event

Wrestle Kingdom
- Promotional poster for the event, featuring wrestlers from both AJPW and NJPW
- Promotion(s): All Japan Pro Wrestling; New Japan Pro-Wrestling
- Date: January 4, 2007
- City: Tokyo, Japan
- Venue: Tokyo Dome
- Attendance: 28,000 (official); 18,000 (claimed)
- Tagline: New Japan/All Japan 35th Anniversary

Pay-per-view chronology
← Previous; G1 Climax 2006	Next → Circuit 2007 New Japan Ism

January 4 Tokyo Dome Show chronology
← Previous; Toukon Shidou Chapter 1	Next → Wrestle Kingdom II

Wrestle Kingdom chronology
← Previous; First	Next → Wrestle Kingdom II

New Japan Pro-Wrestling events chronology
← Previous; Toukon Shidou Chapter 1	Next → Destruction '07

Wrestle Kingdom in Tokyo Dome (レッスルキングダム in 東京ドーム, Ressuru Kingudamu in Tōkyō Dōmu) (sequentially known as Wrestle Kingdom I) was a professional wrestling pay-per-view (PPV) event co-produced by the New Japan Pro-Wrestling (NJPW) and All Japan Pro Wrestling (AJPW) promotions, which took place at the Tokyo Dome in Tokyo, Japan on January 4, 2007. It was the 16th January 4 Tokyo Dome Show and the first held under the new "Wrestle Kingdom" name.

The show marked the 35th anniversary celebration for NJPW, who teamed up with one-time rival promotion AJPW to produce the show. Headlined by two title matches, contested for NJPW's top title, the IWGP Heavyweight Championship, and AJPW's top title, the Triple Crown Heavyweight Championship, as well as the reunion of Keiji Mutoh and Masahiro Chono, all in all, the event featured nine matches.

== Production ==
=== Background ===
When New Japan Pro-Wrestling (NJPW) held the 2006 January 4 Tokyo Dome Show, Toukon Shidou Chapter 1, some saw it as a possible "end of an era". In recent years, the January 4 show, held annually since 1992, had been suffering from a drop in both interest and attendance and while the 2006 show drew 31,000 fans to the Tokyo Dome, only around 10,000 of them paid for their ticket. The show, however, was still considered a success due to high merchandise sales, allowing NJPW to keep the tradition alive for another year. NJPW had previously had success promoting interpromotional shows with All Japan Pro Wrestling (AJPW), and decided to partner with them again for the 2007 Tokyo Dome show in an effort to boost attendance numbers. The partnership was officially announced in a press conference on November 15, 2006. AJPW had recently partnered with Yuke's, the owners of NJPW, for the video game Wrestle Kingdom. As a result, the 2007 January 4 Tokyo Dome show was dubbed "Wrestle Kingdom in Tokyo Dome". The name stuck and the annual January 4 Tokyo Dome show has been known as Wrestle Kingdom ever since.

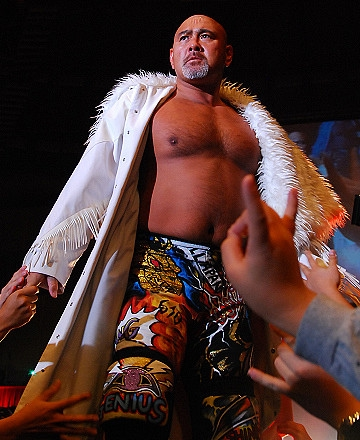
Keiji Mutoh, who was part of the "Super Dream Tag Match"

The main event of the show was booked as a tribute to Shinya Hashimoto, who had died from cerebral hemorrhage on July 11, 2005. In the match, Hashimoto's Three Musketeers partners Keiji Mutoh and Masahiro Chono would take on Hiroyoshi Tenzan and Satoshi Kojima. Both teams had actually disbanded years earlier due to Mutoh and Kojima having jumped from NJPW to AJPW at the start of 2002, but Kojima and Tenzan had recently reunited for AJPW's 2006 Real World Tag League. Mutoh was said to have been negative towards the idea of turning the match into a Hashimoto tribute, but was convinced to go along with it on the day of the show.

=== Storylines ===
Wrestle Kingdom featured professional wrestling matches that involved different wrestlers from pre-existing scripted feuds and storylines. Wrestlers portrayed villains, heroes, or less distinguishable characters in the scripted events that built tension and culminated in a wrestling match or series of matches.

The main theme of the show was interpromotional matches between wrestlers from AJPW and NJPW. The show included two world title matches, contested for AJPW's Triple Crown Heavyweight Championship and NJPW's IWGP Heavyweight Championship with both being interpromotional matches. The Triple Crown Heavyweight Championship featured champion Minoru Suzuki taking on challenger Yuji Nagata. The two were seniors in 1986, when Suzuki beat Nagata twice in amateur wrestling, first in a Tokyo high school tournament and again at the Japanese sectionals. In the IWGP title match, NJPW's Hiroshi Tanahashi was set to defend against AJPW's Taiyō Kea.

== Event ==
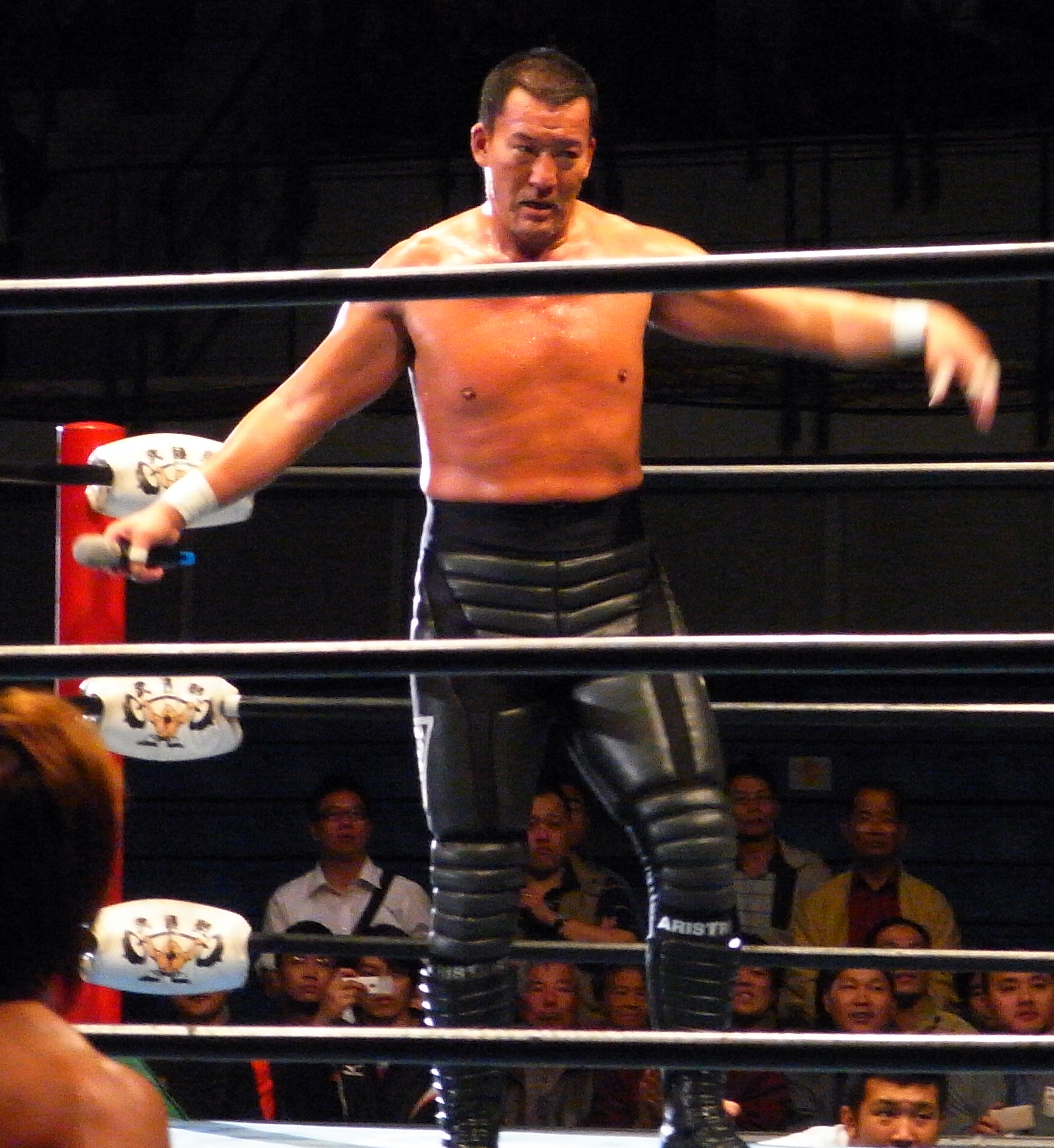
Masahiro Chono, also part of the "Super Dream Tag Match"

NJPW billed the show as having a "double main event", followed by a "Super Dream Tag Match" as the last match of the night. In the first of the "main events", Minoru Suzuki made his second successful defense of the Triple Crown Heavyweight Championship against longtime rival Yuji Nagata. In the second main event, Hiroshi Tanahashi made his third successful defense of the IWGP Heavyweight Championship against Taiyō Kea.

The final match of the show featured AJPW's Keiji Mutoh and NJPW's Masahiro Chono, two thirds of the Three Musketeers, reuniting as a tag team for the first time in eight years and nine months. They defeated Tencozy, a tag team made up of NJPW wrestler Hiroyoshi Tenzan and AJPW wrestler Satoshi Kojima. After the match, Mutoh and Chono paid tribute to the third Musketeer, the late Shinya Hashimoto, with Hashimoto's "Bakushō Sengen" theme song playing to end the show.

Another top match saw freelancer Toshiaki Kawada defeat NJPW's up-and-coming star Shinsuke Nakamura. Katsuhiko Nagata made an appearance at the show, greeting the fans in attendance.

== Reception ==
Dave Meltzer of the Wrestling Observer Newsletter wrote that with Wrestle Kingdom, the end of NJPW's annual January 4 Tokyo Dome Show was "more likely than ever". While NJPW announced an attendance number of 28,000, Meltzer claimed that there were actually only 18,000 fans in attendance with "just over 10,000 paid". Remembering the two sold-out shows that a NJPW versus AJPW program had provided six years earlier, Meltzer wrote that now "the combination of interpromotional matches and the annual tradition meant almost nothing".

== Aftermath ==
Despite the fact that the match between Minoru Suzuki and Yuji Nagata at the inaugural Wrestle Kingdom was pushed as the final match in the 21-year rivalry, the two went on to face each other two more times in subsequent Wrestle Kingdom shows, first in 2011 at Wrestle Kingdom V and then in 2013 at Wrestle Kingdom 7, with Nagata winning both matches.

== Results ==
No.	Results	Stipulations	Times
1	Masanobu Fuchi, Ryusuke Taguchi and El Samurai defeated Akira Raijin, Kikutaro and Nobutaka Araya	Six-man tag team match	08:20
2	Gedo and Jado defeated Tokyo Gurentai (Mazada and Nosawa Rongai)	Tag team match	13:06
3	G.B.H. (Togi Makabe, Tomohiro Ishii and Toru Yano) defeated Buchanan, D'Lo Brown and Travis Tomko	Six-man tag team match	09:36
4	Voodoo Murders (Giant Bernard, Ro'z, Suwama and Taru) defeated Manabu Nakanishi, Naofumi Yamamoto, Riki Choshu and Takashi Iizuka	Eight-man tag team match	15:38
5	Kaz Hayashi, Koji Kanemoto, Taka Michinoku, Tiger Mask and Wataru Inoue defeated C.T.U (Jyushin Thunder Liger, Milano Collection A.T. and Minoru) and Voodoo Murders ("brother" Yasshi and Shuji Kondo)	Ten-man tag team match	13:01
6	Toshiaki Kawada defeated Shinsuke Nakamura	Singles match	19:02
7	Minoru Suzuki (c) defeated Yuji Nagata via referee stoppage	Singles match for the Triple Crown Heavyweight Championship	17:22
8	Hiroshi Tanahashi (c) defeated Taiyō Kea	Singles match for the IWGP Heavyweight Championship	17:09
9	Keiji Mutoh and Masahiro Chono defeated Tencozy (Hiroyoshi Tenzan and Satoshi Kojima)	Tag team match	18:43
(c) / – the champion(s) heading into the match
