= Destruction (2012) =

- Promotional poster for the event, featuring Hiroshi Tanahashi, Kazuchika Okada, Shinsuke Nakamura, Togi Makabe, Tetsuya Naito and Hirooki Goto
- Promotion: New Japan Pro-Wrestling
- Date: September 23, 2012
- City: Kobe, Japan
- Venue: Kobe World Memorial Hall
- Attendance: 8,000

Pay-per-view chronology
← Previous; G1 Climax 22	Next → King of Pro-Wrestling

Destruction chronology
← Previous; 2011	Next → 2013

New Japan Pro-Wrestling events chronology
← Previous; Dominion 6.16	Next → King of Pro-Wrestling

Destruction (2012) was a professional wrestling pay-per-view (PPV) event promoted by New Japan Pro-Wrestling (NJPW). The event took place on September 23, 2012, in Kobe, Hyōgo, at the Kobe World Memorial Hall. The event featured nine matches, two of which were contested for championships. It was the sixth event under the Destruction name.

== Storylines ==
Destruction featured nine professional wrestling matches that involved different wrestlers from pre-existing scripted feuds and storylines. Wrestlers portrayed villains, heroes, or less distinguishable characters in the scripted events that built tension and culminated in a wrestling match or series of matches.

== Event ==
The event featured the professional wrestling return match of both Katsuyori Shibata and Kazushi Sakuraba, two longtime mixed martial artists, who defeated Hiromu Takahashi and Wataru Inoue. The event also featured outside participation from freelancer Daisuke Sasaki, Kaientai Dojo representative Kengo Mashimo and Pro Wrestling Noah representative Naomichi Marufuji, who unsuccessfully challenged Hiroshi Tanahashi for the IWGP Heavyweight Championship in the main event. During the event, Kota Ibushi successfully defended the IWGP Junior Heavyweight Championship against Ryusuke Taguchi.

== Results ==
No.	Results	Stipulations	Times
1	Chaos (Takashi Iizuka and Tomohiro Ishii) defeated Captain New Japan and Tama Tonga	Tag team match	09:16
2	Alex Shelley, Bushi and Kushida defeated Chaos (Alex Koslov, Gedo and Rocky Romero)	Six-man tag team match	09:37
3	Low Ki defeated Daisuke Sasaki	Singles match	08:45
4	Suzuki-gun (Harry Smith, Lance Archer and Minoru Suzuki) defeated Tencozy (Hiroyoshi Tenzan and Satoshi Kojima) and Yuji Nagata	Six-man tag team match	12:02
5	Togi Makabe defeated Kengo Mashimo	Singles match	09:02
6	Laughter7 (Katsuyori Shibata and Kazushi Sakuraba) defeated Hiromu Takahashi and Wataru Inoue	Tag team match	03:03
7	Kota Ibushi (c) defeated Ryusuke Taguchi	Singles match for the IWGP Junior Heavyweight Championship	17:06
8	Hirooki Goto, Karl Anderson and Tetsuya Naito defeated Chaos (Kazuchika Okada, Shinsuke Nakamura and Yujiro Takahashi)	Six-man tag team match	15:08
9	Hiroshi Tanahashi (c) defeated Naomichi Marufuji	Singles match for the IWGP Heavyweight Championship	23:35
(c) / – the champion(s) heading into the match
