= RISE (professional wrestling) =

Professional wrestling stable

Stable
- Members: See below
- Name(s): RISE
- Debut: November 11, 2007
- Disbanded: March 23, 2010

RISE (Real International Super Elite) was a professional wrestling stable that competed in New Japan Pro-Wrestling (NJPW) that was active from 2007 until 2010. The group was founded and led by Shinsuke Nakamura. The group was the successor to the group "BLACK" which featured Nakamura as a co-leader with Masahiro Chono. At one point or another Hirooki Goto, Giant Bernard, Prince Devitt, Minoru, Travis Tomko, Milano Collection AT, Rick Fuller and Low Ki were members of the group. Members of RISE held the IWGP Heavyweight Championship, IWGP Tag Team Championship, IWGP Junior Tag Team Championship as well as winning the 2007 G1 Tag League. In 2009 several members left the group to join Great Bash Heel (GBH) and by early 2010 RISE was ended.

== History ==
=== 2007 ===
In August 2007, Masahiro Chono left BLACK to form LEGEND with other New Japan legends. In November, upon returning from injury, Shinsuke Nakamura reshaped BLACK into RISE. For the new group, Nakamura retained the services of Giant Bernard, Travis Tomko, and Milano Collection A. T. and recruited Hirooki Goto, Minoru, and Prince Devitt. The groups saw success very quickly with Bernard and Tomko already holding the IWGP Tag Team Championship and by November, they also won the 2007 G1 Tag League.

=== 2008 ===
By January 2008, RISE would recruit Low Ki and hold three of the four championships in New Japan as Nakamura defeated Hiroshi Tanahashi for the IWGP Heavyweight Championship at Wrestle Kingdom II in Tokyo Dome on January 4, 2008. Three weeks later on January 27, Minoru and Devitt, called Prince Prince as a team, defeated Taka Michinoku and Dick Togo to win the IWGP Junior Tag Team Championship. RISE's dominance wouldn't last. By February, Low Ki would suffer an injury that would keep him out for months. On February 17, Minoru and Devitt lost the IWGP Jr. Tag Titles to LEGEND's Jyushin Thunder Liger and Akira, Bernard and Tomko lost the IWGP Tag Titles to the Most Violent Players (Togi Makabe and Toru Yano). Despite the losses, RISE would win the big one as Nakamura defeated Kurt Angle to retain the IWGP Title and win the IWGP 3rd Belt Championship, thus unifying the titles. After the February 17 show, RISE lost Tomko as a member as New Japan decided not to renew his contract. In March, Bernard and Goto entered the 2008 New Japan Cup with both losing to Tanahashi (Goto in the 1st round and Bernard in the final). On March 9, Nakamura and Bernard challenged Makabe and Yano for the IWGP Tag Team Championship but the match ended in a no contest. On March 30, Nakamura defeated Tanahashi to retain the IWGP Title. On April 27, Nakamura lost the IWGP Heavyweight Championship to Keiji Mutoh. in June, Devitt and Minoru entered the Best of the Super Juniors tournament but neither won as Minoru finished third in his block while Devitt was injured in his first match and had to withdraw. In July, RISE added Rick Fuller to the group who formed a team with Bernard. On July 21, Minoru and Devitt defeated Liger and AKIRA in a rematch to regain the IWGP Jr. Tag Titles while Bernard and Fuller challenged Makabe and Yano for the IWGP Tag Title but they came up short. In August, Nakamura, Goto, and Bernard entered the G1 Climax tournament with Goto ultimately winning the tournament defeating Togi Makabe in the final. Weeks later on August 30, Goto entered All Japan Pro Wrestling to challenge Mutoh for the IWGP Title but lost. On September 5, Nakamura and Goto challenged Makabe and Yano for the IWGP Tag Team Championship but lost the match when Bernard and Fuller betrayed them and cost them the match. Shortly after the match, Bernard, Fuller, and Low Ki (returning from injury) all joined GBH. On October 13 at Destruction '08, Minoru and Devitt lost the Jr. Tag Team Titles to No Limit (Yujiro Takahashi and Tetsuya Naito), Goto fought Bernard but lost, and Nakamura challenged Mutoh for the IWGP Title but he too lost. In October, Nakamura and Goto entered the 2008 G1 Tag League while Milano entered with Taichi Ishikari but neither team won as Milano finished last in his block while Nakamura and Goto lost in the semi-finals to Makabe and Yano. On December 8, Goto once again fought Giant Bernard but once again was denied revenge, but Nakamura was able to defeat Yano.

=== 2009 ===
In 2009, at Wrestle Kingdom III in Tokyo Dome, Milano, Minoru, and Taichi defeated Mitsuhide Hirasawa, Kazuchika Okada, and Nobuo Yoshihashi in the pre-show match, Devitt teamed Ryusuke Taguchi and Mistico to defeat Averno, Jado, and Gedo, and finally Nakamura and Goto defeated Mitsuharu Misawa and Takashi Sugiura. In late January, Minoru left New Japan and RISE to become a freelancer. On February 15, Nakamura challenged Hiroshi Tanahashi for the IWGP Heavyweight Championship but lost. In March, Nakamura, Goto, and Milano entered the 2009 New Japan Cup. Milano and Nakamura both made it to round two while Goto was able to win the tournament defeating Giant Bernard in the final. On April 5, at Resolution '09, Nakamura turned Heel during his match with Togi Makabe when Toru Yano betrayed Makabe and assisted Nakamura during the match. Following the event, Nakamura left RISE and created a new stable: Chaos. After Nakamura defected, RISE began to decline and despite the fact RISE would continue, the group largely went dormant as Goto returning to the New Japan Seikigun while Milano and Devitt would form teams and began feuding with each other.

By February 2010, Milano retired due to injuries and RISE quietly broke up.

== Members ==
*	Founding member
L	Leader

Member	*	Tenure
Giant Bernard	*	November 11, 2007 – September 5, 2008
Hirooki Goto	*	November 11, 2007 – March 23, 2010
Low Ki		February 2, 2008
Milano Collection A. T.	*	November 11, 2007 – January 18, 2010
Minoru	*	November 11, 2007 – January 31, 2009
Prince Devitt	*	November 11, 2007 – April 23, 2009
Rick Fuller		July 5, 2008 – September 5, 2008
Shinsuke Nakamura	*L	November 11, 2007 – April 23, 2009
Travis Tomko	*	November 11, 2007 – February 17, 2008

== Championships and accomplishments ==
- Inoki Genome Federation
  - IWGP 3rd Belt Championship (1 time) – Nakamura
- New Japan Pro-Wrestling
  - IWGP Heavyweight Championship (1 time) – Nakamura
  - IWGP Tag Team Championship (1 time) – Bernard and Tomko
  - IWGP Junior Heavyweight Tag Team Championship (2 times) – Minoru and Devitt
  - G1 Climax (2008) – Goto
  - G1 Tag League (2007) – Bernard and Tomko
  - New Japan Cup (2009, 2010) – Goto
