= Destruction (2013) =

- Promotional poster for the event, featuring various NJPW wrestlers
- Promotion: New Japan Pro-Wrestling
- Date: September 29, 2013
- City: Kobe, Japan
- Venue: Kobe World Memorial Hall
- Attendance: 8,000

Pay-per-view chronology
← Previous; G1 Climax 23	Next → King of Pro-Wrestling

Destruction chronology
← Previous; 2012	Next → 2014

New Japan Pro-Wrestling events chronology
← Previous; Dominion 6.22	Next → King of Pro-Wrestling

Destruction (2013) was a professional wrestling pay-per-view (PPV) event promoted by New Japan Pro-Wrestling (NJPW). The event took place on September 29, 2013, in Kobe, Hyōgo, at the Kobe World Memorial Hall. The event featured ten matches (including one dark match), four of which were contested for championships. It was the seventh event under the Destruction name.

== Storylines ==
Destruction featured ten professional wrestling matches that involved different wrestlers from pre-existing scripted feuds and storylines. Wrestlers portrayed villains, heroes, or less distinguishable characters in the scripted events that built tension and culminated in a wrestling match or series of matches.

== Event ==
As part of the newly revived relationship between NJPW and the National Wrestling Alliance (NWA), the event featured the third time Rob Conway defended the NWA World Heavyweight Championship in a NJPW ring. The event also saw the culmination of a storyline rivalry between Hiroshi Tanahashi and Prince Devitt, with Tanahashi emerging victorious in a Lumberjack Deathmatch, which set him up as the next challenger for the IWGP Heavyweight Championship. Tetsuya Naito, coming off winning the 2013 G1 Climax, defeated Masato Tanaka to retain his certificate for an IWGP Heavyweight Championship match at Wrestle Kingdom 8 in Tokyo Dome and capture the NEVER Openweight Championship. In the semi-main event, a rematch from Wrestling Dontaku 2013, Shinsuke Nakamura successfully defended the IWGP Intercontinental Championship against Shelton X Benjamin, avenging a loss from final day of the 2013 G1 Climax. In the main event, Kazuchika Okada successfully defended the IWGP Heavyweight Championship against Satoshi Kojima, also avenging a prior loss from the final day of the 2013 G1 Climax.

== Results ==
No.	Results	Stipulations	Times
1^{D}	Chaos (Takashi Iizuka, Yoshi-Hashi and Yujiro Takahashi) defeated Bushi, Takaaki Watanabe and Tiger Mask	Six-man tag team match	06:13
2	Time Splitters (Alex Shelley and Kushida) defeated Suzuki-gun (Taichi and Taka Michinoku)	Tag team match to determine the number one contender to the IWGP Junior Heavyweight Tag Team Championship	12:10
3	Rob Conway (c) (with Bruce Tharpe) defeated Jyushin Thunder Liger	Singles match for the NWA World Heavyweight Championship	08:16
4	Captain New Japan, Máscara Dorada, Togi Makabe and Tomoaki Honma defeated Bullet Club (Bad Luck Fale, Karl Anderson, Rey Bucanero and Tama Tonga)	Eight-man tag team match	10:05
5	Toru Yano defeated Minoru Suzuki by countout	Singles match	08:56
6	Laughter7 (Katsuyori Shibata and Kazushi Sakuraba) defeated Manabu Nakanishi and Yuji Nagata	Tag team match	10:49
7	Hiroshi Tanahashi (with Captain New Japan, Tiger Mask, Togi Makabe and Tomoaki Honma) defeated Prince Devitt (with Bad Luck Fale, Karl Anderson, Rey Bucanero and Tama Tonga)	Lumberjack Deathmatch	13:32
8	Tetsuya Naito defeated Masato Tanaka (c)	Singles match for the NEVER Openweight Championship and Tokyo Dome IWGP Heavyweight Championship challenge rights certificate	18:10
9	Shinsuke Nakamura (c) defeated Shelton X Benjamin	Singles match for the IWGP Intercontinental Championship	12:07
10	Kazuchika Okada (c) (with Gedo) defeated Satoshi Kojima	Singles match for the IWGP Heavyweight Championship	24:44
(c) / – the champion(s) heading into the match; D / – this was a dark match
