= Destruction '10 =

- Promotion: New Japan Pro-Wrestling
- Date: October 11, 2010
- City: Tokyo, Japan
- Venue: Ryōgoku Kokugikan
- Attendance: 8,800

Pay-per-view chronology
← Previous; Dominion 6.19	Next → Wrestle Kingdom V

Destruction chronology
← Previous '09	Next → '11

Destruction '10 was a professional wrestling pay-per-view (PPV) event promoted by New Japan Pro-Wrestling (NJPW). The event took place on October 11, 2010, in Tokyo, at Ryōgoku Kokugikan. The event featured nine matches, two of which were contested for championships.

DDT Pro-Wrestling representatives Kenny Omega and Kota Ibushi and Pro Wrestling Noah representatives Atsushi Aoki and Go Shiozaki worked the event as outsiders. It was the fourth event under the Destruction name.

== Storylines ==
Destruction '10 featured nine professional wrestling matches that involved different wrestlers from pre-existing scripted feuds and storylines. Wrestlers portrayed villains, heroes, or less distinguishable characters in the scripted events that built tension and culminated in a wrestling match or series of matches.

== Event ==
During the event, Kenny Omega and Kota Ibushi captured the IWGP Junior Heavyweight Tag Team Championship from Apollo 55 (Prince Devitt and Ryusuke Taguchi) in the first title switch of the event. In the main event, 2010 G1 Climax winner and freelancer Satoshi Kojima defeated Togi Makabe to win the IWGP Heavyweight Championship for the second time.

== Reception ==
The IWGP Junior Heavyweight Tag Team Championship match was later named the 2010 Match of the Year by Tokyo Sports.

== Results ==
No.	Results	Stipulations	Times
1	Manabu Nakanishi defeated Tama Tonga	Singles match	06:11
2	Bad Intentions (Giant Bernard and Karl Anderson) and Tiger Mask defeated Chaos (Takashi Iizuka, Tomohiro Ishii and Yujiro Takahashi) by disqualification	Six-man tag team match	11:32
3	Complete Players (Gedo, Jado and Masato Tanaka) defeated Jyushin Thunder Liger, Tomoaki Honma and Wataru Inoue	Six-man tag team match	09:55
4	Tajiri defeated Toru Yano	Singles match	06:48
5	Golden☆Lovers (Kenny Omega and Kota Ibushi) defeated Apollo 55 (Prince Devitt and Ryusuke Taguchi) (c)	Tag team match for the IWGP Junior Heavyweight Tag Team Championship	15:05
6	Koji Kanemoto and Yuji Nagata defeated Atsushi Aoki and Go Shiozaki	Tag team match	17:14
7	Hirooki Goto defeated Shinsuke Nakamura	Singles match	16:08
8	Hiroshi Tanahashi defeated Tetsuya Naito by submission	Singles match	19:59
9	Satoshi Kojima defeated Togi Makabe (c)	Singles match for the IWGP Heavyweight Championship	19:12
(c) / – the champion(s) heading into the match
