= Destruction (2018) =

- Promotion: New Japan Pro-Wrestling
- Date: September 15, 2018; September 17, 2018; September 23, 2018
- City: Hiroshima, Japan; Beppu, Ōita, Japan; Kobe, Hyōgo, Japan
- Venue: Hiroshima Sun Plaza; Beppu B-Con Plaza; Kobe World Hall
- Attendance: 3,761 (Hiroshima); 2,280 (Beppu); 6,454 (Kobe)

Event chronology
← Previous; G1 Special in San Francisco; Road to Destruction	Next → Fighting Spirit Unleashed

Destruction chronology
← Previous; 2017	Next → 2019

Destruction (2018) was a series of professional wrestling events promoted by New Japan Pro-Wrestling (NJPW) in 2018: Destruction in Hiroshima on September 15, Destruction in Beppu on September 17 and Destruction in Kobe on September 23. These were events eighteen to twenty in the Destruction chronology.

== Production ==
=== Background ===
2018 is the third consecutive year in which NJPW hold three events under the Destruction name. From 2007 to 2013 NJPW held one event per year, expanding to two shows in 2014 and to three shows in 2016.

=== Storylines ===
The three Destruction events will feature nine professional wrestling matches each that will involve different wrestlers from pre-existing scripted feuds and storylines. Wrestlers portray villains, heroes, or less distinguishable characters in the scripted events that build tension and culminate in a wrestling match or series of matches.

==== Destruction in Hiroshima ====
On the fourteenth day of the G1 Climax, Tomohiro Ishii defeated the IWGP Heavyweight Champion Kenny Omega, handing him his first loss in the tournament. On the tournament's final day, Ishii challenged Omega to a title match with him accepting.

==== Destruction in Beppu ====
At Dominion 6.9 in Osaka-jo Hall, Hirooki Goto lost the NEVER Openweight Championship to Michael Elgin in a three-way match also involving Taichi, with Elgin pinning Taichi to win the title. Goto got a rematch in a singles match against Elgin at the next tour, Kizuna Road, defeating him and regaining the title. On the final day of the G1 Climax, Taichi challenged Goto to a title match.

At Wrestling Hinokuni, Tetsuya Naito defeated Minoru Suzuki to win the IWGP Intercontinental Championship. On the eighteenth day of the G1 Climax (final day of Block B), Suzuki's stablemate Zack Sabre Jr. defeated Naito eliminating him from the tournament. On the G1 Climax's final day, Naito's stable Los Ingobernables de Japón defeated Suzuki-gun in an eight-man tag team match, with Suzuki focusing his attention on attacking Naito. Having already lost to Sabre Jr. in the New Japan Cup earlier in the year Naito wanted a rematch with him, claiming to be disinterested in Suzuki for already having defeated him. However, he is facing Suzuki in a special singles match.

==== Destruction in Kobe ====
At the G1 Special in San Francisco, the IWGP Junior Heavyweight Champion Hiromu Takahashi injured his neck in a title defense against Dragon Lee. He was forced to relinquish the title, with a four-man tournament being announced to crown a new champion. Kushida will face Bushi in the first semifinal, with the winner advancing to the final to be held at King of Pro-Wrestling to face the winner of the second semifinal (either Will Ospreay or Marty Scurll).

On the seventeenth day of the G1 Climax (final day of the Block A), the match between Kazuchika Okada and Hiroshi Tanahashi ended in a time-limit draw, with Tanahashi advancing to the final and eventually winning the tournament. With Tanahashi unable to defeat Okada in their last four encounters, including in a match for the IWGP Heavyweight Championship at Wrestling Dontaku earlier in the year, he nominated Okada as his first opponent to defend the Tokyo Dome IWGP Heavyweight Championship challenge rights certificate.

== Results ==
=== Destruction in Hiroshima ===
No.	Results	Stipulations	Times
1	Jyushin Thunder Liger, Tiger Mask and Kushida defeated Roppongi 3K (Rocky Romero, Yoh and Sho)	Six-man tag team match	07:14
2	Bad Luck Fale defeated Toa Henare	Singles match	02:46
3	Killer Elite Squad (Lance Archer and Davey Boy Smith Jr.) defeated Michael Elgin and Ayato Yoshida	Tag team match	08:53
4	Chaos (Beretta, Chuckie T. and Will Ospreay) defeated Kota Ibushi and Bullet Club Elite (Yujiro Takahashi and Chase Owens)	Six-man tag team match	09:50
5	Bullet Club OG (Tama Tonga, Tanga Loa and Taiji Ishimori) (c) defeated Taguchi Japan (Juice Robinson, David Finlay and Ryusuke Taguchi)	Six-man tag team match for the NEVER Openweight 6-Man Tag Team Championship	11:27
6	Chaos (Hirooki Goto, Toru Yano and Gedo) defeated Suzuki-gun (Taichi, Takashi Iizuka and Yoshinobu Kanemaru)	Six-man tag team match	10:42
7	Los Ingobernables de Japón (Tetsuya Naito, Sanada, Evil and Bushi) defeated Suzuki-gun (Minoru Suzuki, Zack Sabre Jr., Taka Michinoku and El Desperado)	Eight-man tag team match	12:12
8	Hiroshi Tanahashi and Great Bash Heel (Togi Makabe and Tomoaki Honma) defeated Chaos (Kazuchika Okada, Yoshi-Hashi and Jay White)	Six-man tag team match	12:14
9	Kenny Omega (c) defeated Tomohiro Ishii	Singles match for the IWGP Heavyweight Championship	30:55
(c) / – the champion(s) heading into the match

=== Destruction in Beppu ===
No.	Results	Stipulations	Times
1	Yuji Nagata, Manabu Nakanishi and Yuya Uemura defeated Tencozy (Hiroyoshi Tenzan and Satoshi Kojima) and Yota Tsuji	Six-man tag team match	9:08
2	David Finlay and Ren Narita defeated Toa Henare and Shota Umino	Tag team match	6:38
3	Ayato Yoshida defeated Takashi Iizuka by disqualification	Singles match	4:30
4	Taguchi Japan (Jyushin Thunder Liger, Tiger Mask, Kushida and Ryusuke Taguchi) defeated Chaos (Will Ospreay, Rocky Romero, Yoh and Sho)	Eight-man tag team match	10:00
5	Killer Elite Squad (Lance Archer and Davey Boy Smith Jr.) defeated Best Friends (Beretta and Chuckie T.)	Tag team match	10:34
6	Suzuki-gun (Zack Sabre Jr., Yoshinobu Kanemaru and El Desperado) defeated Los Ingobernables de Japón (Sanada, Evil and Bushi)	Six-man tag team match	8:31
7	Hiroshi Tanahashi, Great Bash Heel (Togi Makabe and Tomoaki Honma) and Juice Robinson defeated Chaos (Kazuchika Okada, Toru Yano, Yoshi-Hashi and Jay White)	Eight-man tag team match	13:01
8	Taichi defeated Hirooki Goto (c)	Singles match for the NEVER Openweight Championship	20:54
9	Tetsuya Naito defeated Minoru Suzuki	Singles match	32:08
(c) / – the champion(s) heading into the match

=== Destruction in Kobe ===
No.	Results	Stipulations	Times
1	Yota Tsuji vs. Yuya Uemura ended in a time-limit draw	Singles match	10:00
2	Roppongi 3K (Yoh and Sho) defeated Shota Umino and Ren Narita	Tag team match	8:46
3	Jyushin Thunder Liger and Tiger Mask defeated Suzuki-gun (Yoshinobu Kanemaru and El Desperado)	Tag team match	6:50
4	Tencozy (Hiroyoshi Tenzan and Satoshi Kojima), Yuji Nagata and Manabu Nakanishi defeated Taguchi Japan (Togi Makabe, Tomoaki Honma, Ryusuke Taguchi) and Ayato Yoshida	Eight-man tag team match	9:56
5	Best Friends (Beretta and Chuckie T.) defeated Killer Elite Squad (Lance Archer and Davey Boy Smith Jr.)	Tag team match	12:41
6	Chaos (Jay White, Yoshi-Hashi and Will Ospreay) defeated Juice Robinson, David Finlay and Toa Henare	Six-man tag team match	9:05
7	Los Ingobernables de Japón (Tetsuya Naito, Sanada and Evil) defeated Suzuki-gun (Minoru Suzuki, Zack Sabre Jr. and Taka Michinoku)	Six-man tag team match	11:20
8	Kushida defeated Bushi	IWGP Junior Heavyweight Championship tournament semifinal match	16:41
9	Hiroshi Tanahashi defeated Kazuchika Okada	Singles match for the Tokyo Dome IWGP Heavyweight Championship challenge rights certificate	35:43
