= Destruction (2019) =

- Promotion: New Japan Pro-Wrestling
- Date: September 15, 2019; September 16, 2019; September 22, 2019
- City: Beppu, Ōita, Japan; Kagoshima, Japan; Kobe, Hyōgo, Japan
- Venue: Beppu B-Con Plaza; Kagoshima Arena; Kobe World Hall
- Attendance: 2,430 (Beppu); 4,004 (Kagoshima); 6,148 (Kobe)

Event chronology
← Previous; Royal Quest; Road to Destruction	Next → Fighting Spirit Unleashed

Destruction chronology
← Previous; 2018	Next → 2023

Destruction (2019) was a series of professional wrestling events promoted by New Japan Pro-Wrestling (NJPW) in 2019: Destruction in Beppu on September 15, Destruction in Kagoshima on September 16 and Destruction in Kobe on September 22. These were events twenty-one to twenty-three in the Destruction chronology.

== Production ==
=== Background ===
2019 is the fourth consecutive year in which NJPW held three events under the Destruction name. From 2007 to 2013 NJPW held one event per year, expanding to two shows in 2014 and to three shows in 2016.

=== Storylines ===
The three Destruction events featured nine professional wrestling matches each that involved different wrestlers from pre-existing scripted feuds and storylines. Wrestlers portray villains, heroes, or less distinguishable characters in the scripted events that build tension and culminate in a wrestling match or series of matches.

== Results ==
=== Destruction in Beppu ===
No.	Results	Stipulations	Times
1	Karl Fredericks defeated Yota Tsuji by submission	Singles match in the 12th Young Lion Cup	7:23
2	Shota Umino defeated Alex Coughlin	Singles match in the 12th Young Lion Cup	8:14
3	Yuji Nagata, Ryusuke Taguchi, Ren Narita and Yuya Uemura defeated Manabu Nakanishi, Toa Henare, Clark Connors and Michael Richards by submission	Eight-man tag team match	11:18
4	Jyushin Thunder Liger and Roppongi 3K (Sho and Yoh) defeated Suzuki-gun (Minoru Suzuki, Yoshinobu Kanemaru and Douki)	Six-man tag team match	10:36
5	Bullet Club (Kenta, Bad Luck Fale, Yujiro Takahashi, Taiji Ishimori and El Phantasmo) defeated Kota Ibushi, Great Bash Heel (Togi Makabe and Tomoaki Honma) and The Birds of Prey (Will Ospreay and Robbie Eagles)	Ten-man tag team match	9:17
6	Los Ingobernables de Japón (Sanada, Shingo Takagi and Bushi) defeated Chaos (Kazuchika Okada, Hirooki Goto and Rocky Romero) by submission	Six-man tag team match	10:40
7	Los Ingobernables de Japón (Tetsuya Naito and Evil) defeated Bullet Club (Jay White and Chase Owens)	Tag team match	11:11
8	Guerrillas of Destiny (Tama Tonga and Tanga Loa) (c) defeated Chaos (Tomohiro Ishii and Yoshi-Hashi)	Tag team match for the IWGP Tag Team Championship	21:35
9	Zack Sabre Jr. defeated Hiroshi Tanahashi (c)	Singles match for the British Heavyweight Championship	26:43
(c) / – the champion(s) heading into the match

=== Destruction in Kagoshima ===
No.	Results	Stipulations	Times
1	Yuya Uemura defeated Clark Connors by submission	Singles match in the 12th Young Lion Cup	9:31
2	Ren Narita defeated Michael Richards	Singles match in the 12th Young Lion Cup	7:18
3	Manabu Nakanishi, Toa Henare, Karl Fredericks and Alex Coughlin defeated Yuji Nagata, Ryusuke Taguchi, Shota Umino and Yota Tsuji	Eight-man tag team match	9:45
4	Chaos (Tomohiro Ishii, Yoshi-Hashi, Sho and Yoh) defeated Bullet Club (Tama Tonga, Tanga Loa, Bad Luck Fale and Chase Owens)	Eight-man tag team match	6:51
5	Hiroshi Tanahashi, Great Bash Heel (Togi Makabe and Tomoaki Honma) and Jyushin Thunder Liger defeated Suzuki-gun (Zack Sabre Jr., Minoru Suzuki, Yoshinobu Kanemaru and Douki) by disqualification	Eight-man tag team match	9:22
6	Chaos (Kazuchika Okada, Hirooki Goto and Rocky Romero) defeated Los Ingobernables de Japón (Sanada, Shingo Takagi and Bushi)	Six-man tag team match	10:08
7	Los Ingobernables de Japón (Tetsuya Naito and Evil) defeated Bullet Club (Jay White and Yujiro Takahashi)	Tag team match	11:50
8	Bullet Club (Taiji Ishimori and El Phantasmo) (c) defeated The Birds of Prey (Will Ospreay and Robbie Eagles)	Tag team match for the IWGP Junior Heavyweight Tag Team Championship	23:10
9	Kota Ibushi defeated Kenta	Singles match for the Tokyo Dome IWGP Heavyweight Championship challenge rights certificate	26:23
(c) / – the champion(s) heading into the match

=== Destruction in Kobe ===
No.	Results	Stipulations	Times
1	Yuji Nagata, Yota Tsuji and Yuya Uemura defeated Manabu Nakanishi, Alex Coughlin and Michael Richards by submission	Six-man tag team match	10:05
2	Clark Connors defeated Ren Narita by submission	Singles match in the 12th Young Lion Cup	7:25
3	Karl Fredericks defeated Shota Umino by submission	Singles match in the 12th Young Lion Cup	7:17
4	Bullet Club (Bad Luck Fale, Yujiro Takahashi and Chase Owens) defeated Great Bash Heel (Togi Makabe and Tomoaki Honma) and Toa Henare	Six-man tag team match	8:22
5	Suzuki-gun (Zack Sabre Jr., Minoru Suzuki, Yoshinobu Kanemaru and Douki) defeated Hiroshi Tanahashi, Jyushin Thunder Liger, Tiger Mask and Rocky Romero by disqualification	Eight-man tag team match	3:10
6	Chaos (Tomohiro Ishii, Yoshi-Hashi, Will Ospreay, Sho and Yoh) defeated Bullet Club (Kenta, Tama Tonga, Tanga Loa, Taiji Ishimori and El Phantasmo)	Ten-man tag team match	9:40
7	Los Ingobernables de Japón (Sanada, Evil and Bushi) defeated Chaos (Kazuchika Okada and Robbie Eagles) and Kota Ibushi by submission	Six-man tag team match	13:50
8	Hirooki Goto defeated Shingo Takagi	Singles match	20:27
9	Jay White (with Gedo) defeated Tetsuya Naito (c)	Singles match for the IWGP Intercontinental Championship	29:47
(c) / – the champion(s) heading into the match
