= Wrestle Kingdom III =

2009 New Japan Pro-Wrestling pay-per-view event

- Promotional poster for the event, featuring Keiji Mutoh and Hiroshi Tanahashi
- Promotion: New Japan Pro-Wrestling
- Date: January 4, 2009
- City: Tokyo, Japan
- Venue: Tokyo Dome
- Attendance: 40,000 (official); 27,500 (claimed)

Pay-per-view chronology
← Previous; Destruction	Next → Circuit New Japan Ism

Wrestle Kingdom chronology
← Previous; II	Next → IV

New Japan Pro-Wrestling events chronology
← Previous; Destruction '08	Next → Wrestling Dontaku 2009

Wrestle Kingdom III in Tokyo Dome (レッスルキングダムIII in 東京ドーム, Ressuru Kingudamu III in Tōkyō Dōmu) was a professional wrestling pay-per-view (PPV) event produced by the New Japan Pro-Wrestling (NJPW) promotion, which took place at the Tokyo Dome in Tokyo, Japan on January 4, 2009. It was the 18th January 4 Tokyo Dome Show and the third held under the "Wrestle Kingdom" name. The event featured eleven matches (including one dark match), five of which were contested for championships.

For the second year in a row, the show featured wrestlers from the American Total Nonstop Action Wrestling (TNA) and again their matches aired in the United States as part of the Global Impact! broadcast. In addition, the show also featured wrestlers from the Mexican Consejo Mundial de Lucha Libre (CMLL) as part of a new relationship between NJPW and CMLL. Wrestlers from other Japanese promotions also took part in the show, including All Japan Pro Wrestling (AJPW), Pro Wrestling Noah and Pro Wrestling Zero1, whose top title, the World Heavyweight Championship, was defended during the show.

== Storylines ==
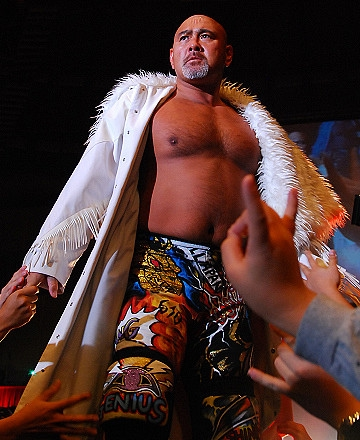
All Japan Pro Wrestling's Keiji Mutoh held the IWGP Heavyweight Championship heading into Wrestle Kingdom III

Wrestle Kingdom III featured eleven professional wrestling matches that involved different wrestlers from pre-existing scripted feuds and storylines. Wrestlers portrayed villains, heroes, or less distinguishable characters in the scripted events that built tension and culminated in a wrestling match or series of matches.

Wrestle Kingdom III was main evented by Keiji Mutoh defending the IWGP Heavyweight Championship against Hiroshi Tanahashi. On April 27, 2008, Mutoh defeated Shinsuke Nakamura to win the IWGP Heavyweight Championship for the first time in eight years and four months. Mutoh, who was part of NJPW's "golden age" in the 1990s, was now representing All Japan Pro Wrestling (AJPW).

Over the following months, NJPW wrestlers attempted to defeat Mutoh to bring the title back to NJPW. After Mutoh had defeated Nakamura in a rematch on October 13 to make his fourth successful title defense, there were no more NJPW challengers left in sight to challenge the outsider. Meanwhile, Hiroshi Tanahashi, after a poor outing in the 2008 G1 Climax, had chosen to travel to the United States to train and work for the Orlando, Florida-based Total Nonstop Action Wrestling (TNA) promotion. In November, NJPW president Naoki Sugabayashi, desperate to bring the IWGP Heavyweight Championship back to his company, traveled to Orlando to talk Tanahashi into coming back and challenging Mutoh. Tanahashi ended up canceling his scheduled TNA bookings and returned to Japan to accept the match with Mutoh at Wrestle Kingdom III.

The IWGP Tag Team Championship was scheduled to be defended in a three-way match involving defending champions The Most Violent Players (Togi Makabe and Toru Yano), Tencozy (Hiroyoshi Tenzan and Satoshi Kojima) and the TNA tag team Team 3D (Brother Devon and Brother Ray). This would have marked the first three-way match for the IWGP Tag Team Championship in history. However, when Tenzan suffered a retinal detachment, he and Kojima were pulled out of the match and it was turned into a hardcore match.

== Event ==
In the main event of the show, Hiroshi Tanahashi defeated Keiji Mutoh to capture the IWGP Heavyweight Championship, bringing the title back to NJPW. While NJPW regained possession of the heavyweight championship as well as the IWGP Junior Heavyweight Championship with Tiger Mask defeating Low Ki, it lost possession of both of its tag team championships, which were both captured by wrestlers from TNA. In the first match, The Motor City Machine Guns (Alex Shelley and Chris Sabin) defeated No Limit (Tetsuya Naito and Yujiro) to win the IWGP Junior Heavyweight Tag Team Championship, while in the second match, Team 3D defeated The Most Violent Players in a hardcore match to win the IWGP Tag Team Championship.

Pro Wrestling Zero1's World Heavyweight Championship was also defended during the show with NJPW wrestler Yuji Nagata making his third successful title defense against Zero's Masato Tanaka. The event is also notable for featuring the final NJPW match of Pro Wrestling Noah wrestler Mitsuharu Misawa, prior to his death in the ring the following June.

== Results ==
No.	Results	Stipulations	Times
1^{D}	Milano Collection A.T., Minoru and Taichi Ishikari defeated Kazuchika Okada, Mitsuhide Hirasawa and Nobuo Yoshihashi	Six-man tag team match	06:24
2	Místico, Prince Devitt and Ryusuke Taguchi defeated Averno, Gedo and Jado	Six-man tag team match	09:50
3	Jyushin Thunder Liger and Takuma Sano defeated Koji Kanemoto and Wataru Inoue	Tag team match	08:47
4	The Motor City Machine Guns (Alex Shelley and Chris Sabin) defeated No Limit (Tetsuya Naito and Yujiro) (c)	Tag team match for the IWGP Junior Heavyweight Tag Team Championship	13:21
5	Tiger Mask defeated Low Ki (c)	Singles match for the IWGP Junior Heavyweight Championship	08:48
6	Legend (Kevin Nash, Kurt Angle, Masahiro Chono and Riki Choshu) defeated G.B.H. (Giant Bernard, Karl Anderson, Takashi Iizuka and Tomohiro Ishii)	Eight-man tag team match	07:09
7	Yuji Nagata (c) defeated Masato Tanaka	Singles match for the World Heavyweight Championship	11:41
8	Jun Akiyama defeated Manabu Nakanishi	Singles match	10:27
9	Team 3D (Brother Devon and Brother Ray) defeated The Most Violent Players (Togi Makabe and Toru Yano) (c)	Hardcore match for the IWGP Tag Team Championship	15:34
10	Shinsuke Nakamura and Hirooki Goto defeated Mitsuharu Misawa and Takashi Sugiura	Tag team match	15:17
11	Hiroshi Tanahashi defeated Keiji Mutoh (c)	Singles match for the IWGP Heavyweight Championship	30:32
(c) / – the champion(s) heading into the match; D / – this was a dark match

== See also ==
- TNA Global Impact!
