= NJPW Destruction =

Destruction
- NJPW Destruction logo
- Promotions: New Japan Pro-Wrestling
- First event: Destruction '07

Destruction is an annual professional wrestling event promoted by New Japan Pro-Wrestling (NJPW). The event has been held since 2007 as a pay-per-view (PPV). From 2013 to 2014, the event also aired outside Japan as an internet pay-per-view (iPPV). Since 2015, the event has aired worldwide on NJPW's internet streaming site, NJPW World. Destruction is currently held in late September as the first major event after the conclusion of the G1 Climax, with several matches at the event often stemming from previous matches in the G1 Climax. Destruction also continues the road to the January 4 Dome Show, which starts at the G1 Climax.

The 2018 Destruction event was the first time since 2013 (and the first time since NJPW started doing multiple Destruction Events) that featured an IWGP Heavyweight Championship match and the first time to not include an IWGP Intercontinental Championship match since 2012. From 2007 until 2011 the event was held at Ryōgoku Kokugikan in Tokyo but since 2012 the event has been held at various different venues, mainly at World Memorial Hall in Kobe. The tour was absent from 2020 until 2022 and will return in 2023 with one of the events being held at Ryōgoku Kokugikan, making this the first time since 2011 the event will take place at the venue.

== Events ==
#	Event	Date	City	Venue	Attendance	Main event	Ref(s)
1	Destruction '07	November 11, 2007	Tokyo, Japan	Ryōgoku Kokugikan	6,500	Hiroshi Tanahashi (c) vs. Hirooki Goto for the IWGP Heavyweight Championship	
2	Destruction '08	October 13, 2008	Tokyo, Japan	Ryōgoku Kokugikan	9,000	Keiji Mutoh (c) vs. Shinsuke Nakamura for the IWGP Heavyweight Championship	
3	Destruction '09	November 8, 2009	Tokyo, Japan	Ryōgoku Kokugikan	7,500	Shinsuke Nakamura (c) vs. Hiroshi Tanahashi for the IWGP Heavyweight Championship	
4	Destruction '10	October 11, 2010	Tokyo, Japan	Ryōgoku Kokugikan	8,800	Togi Makabe (c) vs. Satoshi Kojima for the IWGP Heavyweight Championship	
5	Destruction '11	October 10, 2011	Tokyo, Japan	Ryōgoku Kokugikan	6,500	Hiroshi Tanahashi (c) vs. Tetsuya Naito for the IWGP Heavyweight Championship	
6	Destruction (2012)	September 23, 2012	Kobe, Japan	Kobe World Memorial Hall	8,000	Hiroshi Tanahashi (c) vs. Naomichi Marufuji for the IWGP Heavyweight Championship	
7	Destruction (2013)	September 29, 2013	Kobe, Japan	Kobe World Memorial Hall	8,000	Kazuchika Okada (c) vs. Satoshi Kojima for the IWGP Heavyweight Championship	
8	Destruction in Kobe (2014)	September 21, 2014	Kobe, Japan	Kobe World Memorial Hall	8,000	Bad Luck Fale (c) vs. Shinsuke Nakamura for the IWGP Intercontinental Championship	
9	Destruction in Okayama (2014)	September 23, 2014	Okayama, Japan	Convex Okayama	3,600	Kazuchika Okada vs. Karl Anderson for the Tokyo Dome IWGP Heavyweight Championship challenge rights certificate	
10	Destruction in Okayama (2015)	September 23, 2015	Okayama, Japan	Momotaro Arena	3,160	Togi Makabe (c) vs. Kota Ibushi for the NEVER Openweight Championship	
11	Destruction in Kobe (2015)	September 27, 2015	Kobe, Japan	Kobe World Memorial Hall	6,120	Hirooki Goto (c) vs. Shinsuke Nakamura for the IWGP Intercontinental Championship	
12	Destruction in Tokyo	September 17, 2016	Tokyo, Japan	Ota City General Gymnasium	2,803	Kushida (c) vs. Bushi for the IWGP Junior Heavyweight Championship	
13	Destruction in Hiroshima (2016)	September 22, 2016	Hiroshima, Japan	Hiroshima Sun Plaza Hall	2,801	Kenny Omega vs. Yoshi-Hashi for the Tokyo Dome IWGP Heavyweight Championship challenge rights certificate	
14	Destruction in Kobe (2016)	September 25, 2016	Kobe, Japan	Kobe World Memorial Hall	5,432	Michael Elgin (c) vs. Tetsuya Naito for the IWGP Intercontinental Championship	
15	Destruction in Fukushima	September 10, 2017	Fukushima, Japan	Azuma Gymnasium	2,056	Minoru Suzuki (c) vs. Michael Elgin for the NEVER Openweight Championship	
16	Destruction in Hiroshima (2017)	September 16, 2017	Hiroshima, Japan	Hiroshima Sun Plaza Hall	3,601	Hiroshi Tanahashi (c) vs. Zack Sabre Jr. for the IWGP Intercontinental Championship	
17	Destruction in Kobe (2017)	September 24, 2017	Kobe, Japan	Kobe World Memorial Hall	5,482	Kenny Omega (c) vs. Juice Robinson for the IWGP United States Heavyweight Championship	
18	Destruction In Hiroshima (2018)	September 15, 2018	Hiroshima, Japan	Hiroshima Sun Plaza Hall	3,760	Kenny Omega (c) vs. Tomohiro Ishii for the IWGP Heavyweight Championship	
19	Destruction in Beppu (2018)	September 17, 2018	Beppu, Japan	Beppu B-con Plaza	2,280	Tetsuya Naito vs. Minoru Suzuki	
20	Destruction in Kobe (2018)	September 23, 2018	Kobe, Japan	Kobe World Memorial Hall	6,454	Hiroshi Tanahashi vs. Kazuchika Okada for the Tokyo Dome IWGP Heavyweight Championship challenge rights certificate	
21	Destruction in Beppu (2019)	September 15, 2019	Beppu, Japan	Beppu B-con Plaza	2,430	Hiroshi Tanahashi (c) vs. Zack Sabre Jr. for British Heavyweight Championship	
22	Destruction in Kagoshima	September 16, 2019	Kagoshima, Japan	Kagoshima Arena	4,004	Kota Ibushi vs. Kenta for the Tokyo Dome IWGP Heavyweight Championship challenge rights certificate	
23	Destruction in Kobe (2019)	September 22, 2019	Kobe, Japan	Kobe World Memorial Hall	6,148	Tetsuya Naito (c) vs. Jay White for the IWGP Intercontinental Championship	
24	Destruction in Kobe (2023)	September 24, 2023	Kobe, Japan	Kobe World Memorial Hall	4,212	Will Ospreay (c) vs. Yota Tsuji for the IWGP United Kingdom Heavyweight Championship	
25	Destruction in Ryogoku	October 9, 2023	Tokyo, Japan	Ryōgoku Kokugikan	5,002	Sanada (c) vs. Evil in a lumberjack match for the IWGP World Heavyweight Championship	
26	Destruction in Kobe (2024)	September 29, 2024	Kobe, Japan	Kobe World Memorial Hall	4,528	Tetsuya Naito (c) vs. Great-O-Khan for the IWGP World Heavyweight Championship	
27	Destruction in Kobe (2025)	September 28, 2025	Kobe, Japan	Kobe World Memorial Hall	4,674	Zack Sabre Jr. (c) vs. Ren Narita for the IWGP World Heavyweight Championship	
28	Destruction in Kobe (2026)	September 27, 2026	Kobe, Japan	Kobe World Memorial Hall	4,870	Yota Tsuji (c) vs. Hirooki Goto for the IWGP Heavyweight Championship	
(c) – refers to the champion(s) heading into the match

== See also ==
- List of New Japan Pro-Wrestling pay-per-view events
