= Destruction (2016) =

2016 New Japan Pro-Wrestling event series

- Promotional poster for Destruction in Tokyo, featuring various NJPW wrestlers
- Promotion: New Japan Pro-Wrestling
- Date: September 17, 2016; September 22, 2016; September 25, 2016
- City: Tokyo; Hiroshima; Kobe
- Venue: Ota City General Gymnasium; Hiroshima Sun Plaza Hall; Kobe World Memorial Hall
- Attendance: 2,803; 2,801; 5,432

Event chronology
← Previous; Road to Destruction	Next → New Japan Road: Ganbarou! Uonuma

Destruction chronology
← Previous; 2015	Next → Fukushima

New Japan Pro-Wrestling events chronology
← Previous; Lion's Gate Project 3	Next → King of Pro-Wrestling

Destruction (2016) was a series of three professional wrestling events promoted by New Japan Pro-Wrestling (NJPW) in 2016; Destruction in Tokyo on September 17, Destruction in Hiroshima on September 22, and Destruction in Kobe on September 25.

The events featured nine matches each, six of which were contested for championships. Collectively, these were the twelve to fourteenth events under the Destruction name. All three events aired live worldwide on NJPW World, with the Kobe event also airing on pay-per-view (PPV) in Japan.

== Production ==
=== Background ===
From 2007 to 2013, NJPW held one "Destruction" event per year, later expanding to two shows in 2014 and 2015. 2016 was the first year in which the promotion would hold three events under the "Destruction" name.

=== Storylines ===
The Destruction shows featured nine professional wrestling matches, each of which involved different wrestlers from pre-existing scripted feuds and storylines. Wrestlers portrayed villains, heroes, or less distinguishable characters in the scripted events that built tension and culminated in a wrestling match or series of matches.

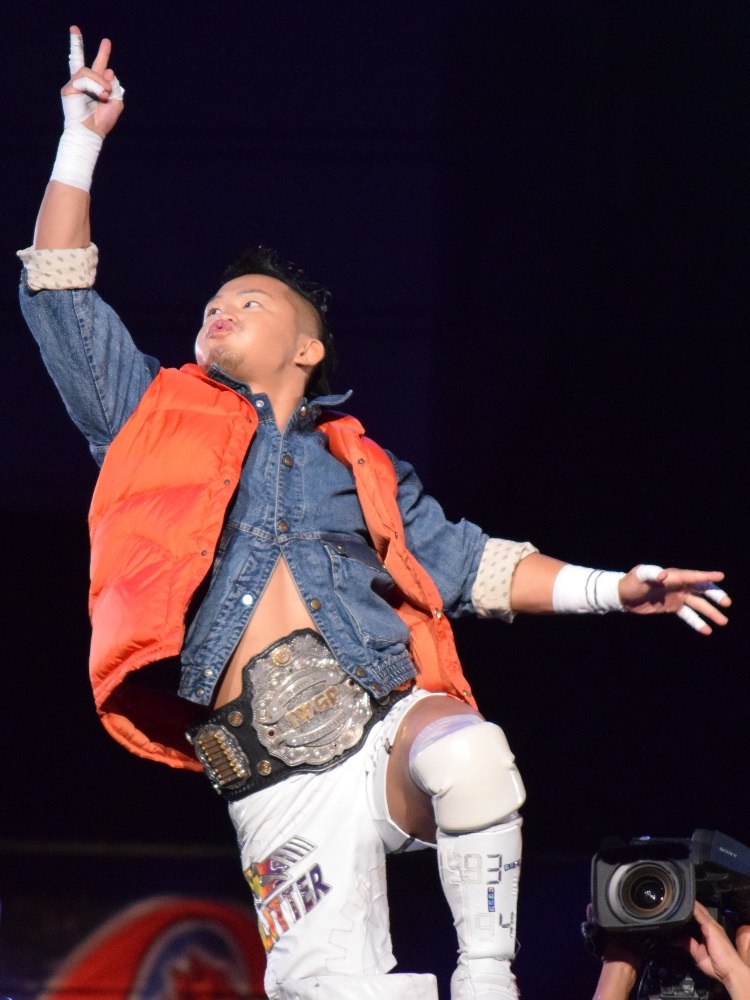
Kushida, who defended the IWGP Junior Heavyweight Championship in the main event of Destruction in Tokyo

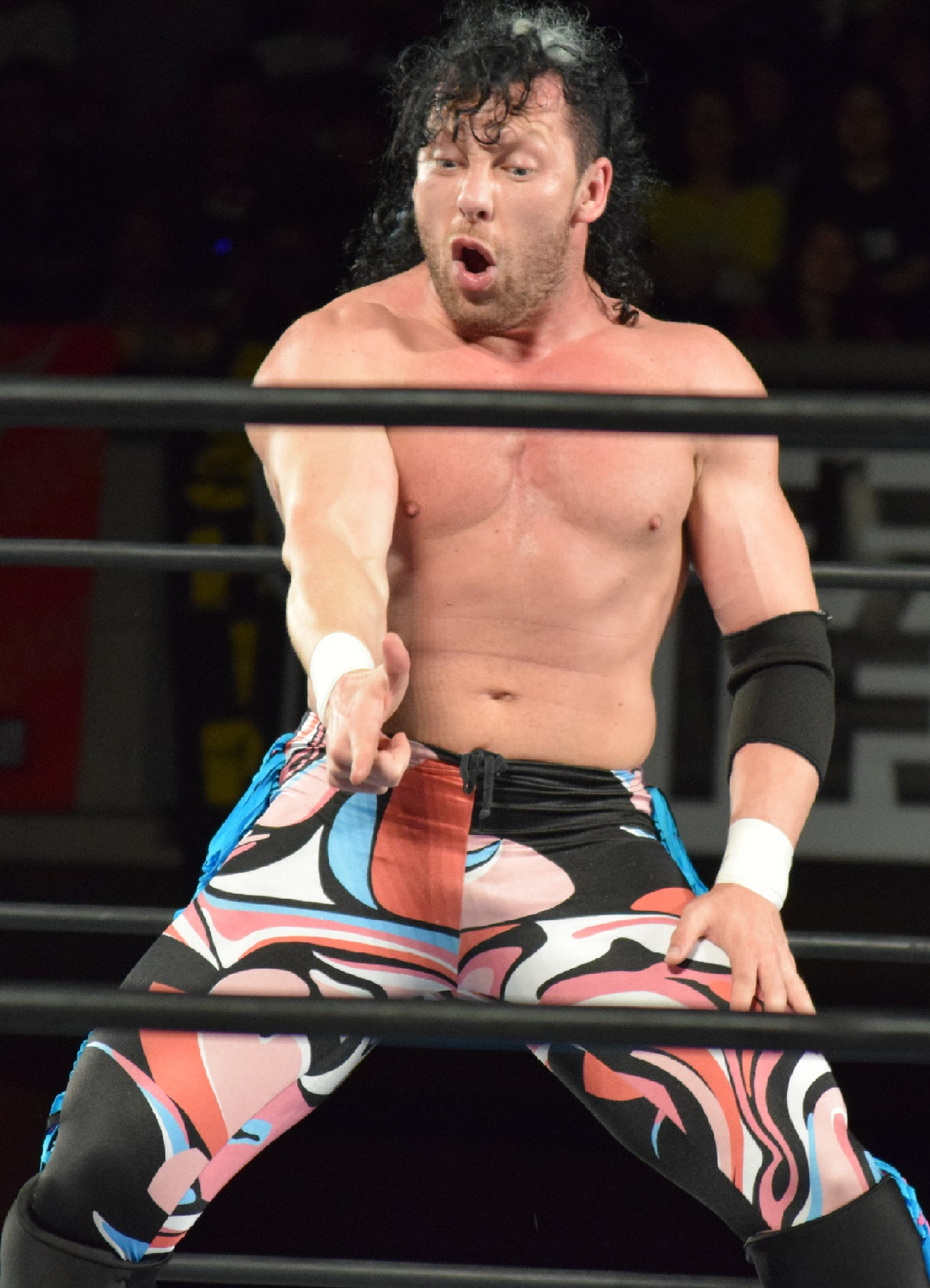
Kenny Omega defended his status as the number one contender to the IWGP Heavyweight Championship in the main event of Destruction in Hiroshima

Destruction in Tokyo was main evented by Kushida defending the IWGP Junior Heavyweight Championship against Bushi. The two previously faced off for the title on February 14 at The New Beginning in Niigata, where Kushida retained the title. Afterwards, Bushi began eyeing a rematch opportunity with Kushida, which eventually came during the 2016 Best of the Super Juniors tournament, where Bushi defeated Kushida in their final round-robin match on June 6, eliminating the reigning IWGP Junior Heavyweight Championship from the finals of the tournament. Following the match, Bushi made a challenge for a title match, which was made official on August 22, the day after Kushida had won the 2016 Super J-Cup. In the buildup to the title match, NJPW noted the similarities between the two wrestlers with both being 33-years old and having come to NJPW from other organizations (Kushida from Smash and Bushi from All Japan Pro Wrestling). Despite having already been granted the title shot by NJPW, Bushi suggested he would boycott the match unless he was nominated as the challenger by Kushida himself. After being pinned by Bushi in a six-man tag team match on September 12, Kushida officially appointed Bushi as his next challenger. Destruction in Tokyo would also feature another title match, where Katsuyori Shibata defended the NEVER Openweight Championship against Bobby Fish. This match was made as a result of events that took place at a Ring of Honor (ROH) event in Las Vegas, Nevada on August 20, where Fish successfully defended the ROH World Television Championship against Shibata. Fish would be the first junior heavyweight wrestler to challenge for the NEVER Openweight Championship since April 2014. In the week leading to the title match, Shibata was sidelined with a cervical spine injury, forcing him to miss NJPW's September 14 and 15 events. However, it was announced that the title match would go on as scheduled.

Destruction in Hiroshima was main evented by Kenny Omega taking on Yoshi-Hashi. On August 14, Omega defeated Hirooki Goto in the finals to win the 2016 G1 Climax, becoming the first foreigner to win the annual tournament. During the tournament, Omega suffered three losses, against NEVER Openweight Champion Katsuyori Shibata, IWGP Intercontinental Champion Michael Elgin and Yoshi-Hashi. Omega's loss against Yoshi-Hashi in their opening match on July 22 was considered a major upset, and after winning the tournament Omega called the loss humiliating and nominated Yoshi-Hashi as the first challenger for his G1 Climax winning prize; a contract for an IWGP Heavyweight Championship match on January 4, 2017, at Wrestle Kingdom 11 in Tokyo Dome. The match was made official on August 22. Other featured matches included reigning IWGP Heavyweight Champion Kazuchika Okada taking on Bad Luck Fale. During the 2016 G1 Climax, Fale defeated Okada, who afterwards demanded a rematch with him. Due to Okada already being set to defend the IWGP Heavyweight Championship against Naomichi Marufuji on October 10 at King of Pro-Wrestling, the title would not be on the line in the match with Fale. However, Fale stated that if he were to win at Destruction in Hiroshima, he wanted a shot at the IWGP Heavyweight Championship at NJPW's New Zealand event on November 12. Also on the card, reigning ROH World Champion Adam Cole returned to NJPW, taking on 2016 Best of the Super Juniors winner Will Ospreay. This would mark Cole's singles match debut in NJPW. On August 29, NJPW announced that the match would be contested for Cole's title. Destruction in Hiroshima's only title match would see The Briscoe Brothers (Jay Briscoe and Mark Briscoe) defend the IWGP Tag Team Championship against The Young Bucks (Matt Jackson and Nick Jackson). The Young Bucks made a challenge for the "heavyweight" tag team title on August 21 after successfully defending the IWGP Junior Heavyweight Tag Team Championship against The Motor City Machine Guns. Though the two teams work in different weight divisions in NJPW, they had a history with each other from ROH, where the tag team division has no weight limits. This match would mark the first time in NJPW history that the reigning IWGP Junior Heavyweight Tag Team Champions challenge for the IWGP Tag Team Championship.

Destruction in Kobe was main evented by Michael Elgin taking on Tetsuya Naito. The match was originally announced as a "potential" IWGP Intercontinental Championship match, provided that Elgin first successfully defended the title against Donovan Dijak at an ROH event on August 27. Elgin went on to defeat Dijak to make the main event of Destruction in Kobe for the title. The match stemmed from the 2016 G1 Climax, where Naito defeated Elgin. Afterwards, Elgin offered a title match to Naito, who accepted. Though he took part in the tournament to crown the inaugural IWGP Intercontinental Champion in May 2011, this would mark Naito's first ever shot at the title. The event also featured outside participation from the Pro Wrestling Noah promotion with Atsushi Kotoge, Daisuke Harada and Naomichi Marufuji teaming with Toru Yano to take on the Chaos quartet of Gedo, Jado, Kazuchika Okada and Yoshi-Hashi. The match not only built up the IWGP Heavyweight Championship match between Okada and Marufuji, but also a GHC Junior Heavyweight Tag Team Championship match between champions Kotoge and Harada and challengers Gedo and Jado. Toru Yano, who teamed with the Noah trio in the match, was also a member of Chaos, but held the GHC Tag Team Championship with Marufuji in Noah. This led to problems between Yano and Marufuji with the latter beginning to question his partner's ultimate allegiance in the week leading to Destruction in Kobe. The event's second title match was scheduled to feature Matt Sydal, Ricochet and Satoshi Kojima defending the NEVER Openweight 6-Man Tag Team Championship against the Bullet Club trio of Adam Cole and The Young Bucks. The champions had won the title on July 3 by defeating another Bullet Club trio, made up of The Young Bucks and Kenny Omega. However, on the day of the show, the champions were stripped of the title due to Sydal failing to make the show because of travel issues with David Finlay replacing him in a new match for the now vacant title. Destruction in Kobe's undercard was also set to feature the culmination of a storyline, where Yoshitatsu had announced a fan poll on Twitter to decide whether Captain New Japan would get to remain a member of his anti-Bullet Club stable Hunter Club. Yoshitatsu had formed the group the previous April with Captain as its first member, but had recently become upset with his stablemates poor performances, which led to him creating the poll.

== Events ==
=== Destruction in Tokyo ===
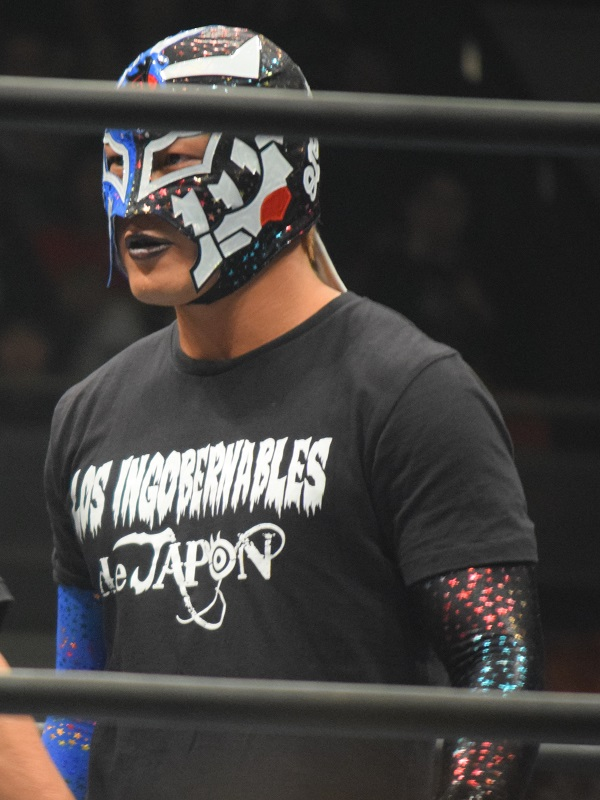
Bushi, who captured the IWGP Junior Heavyweight Championship in the main event of Destruction in Tokyo

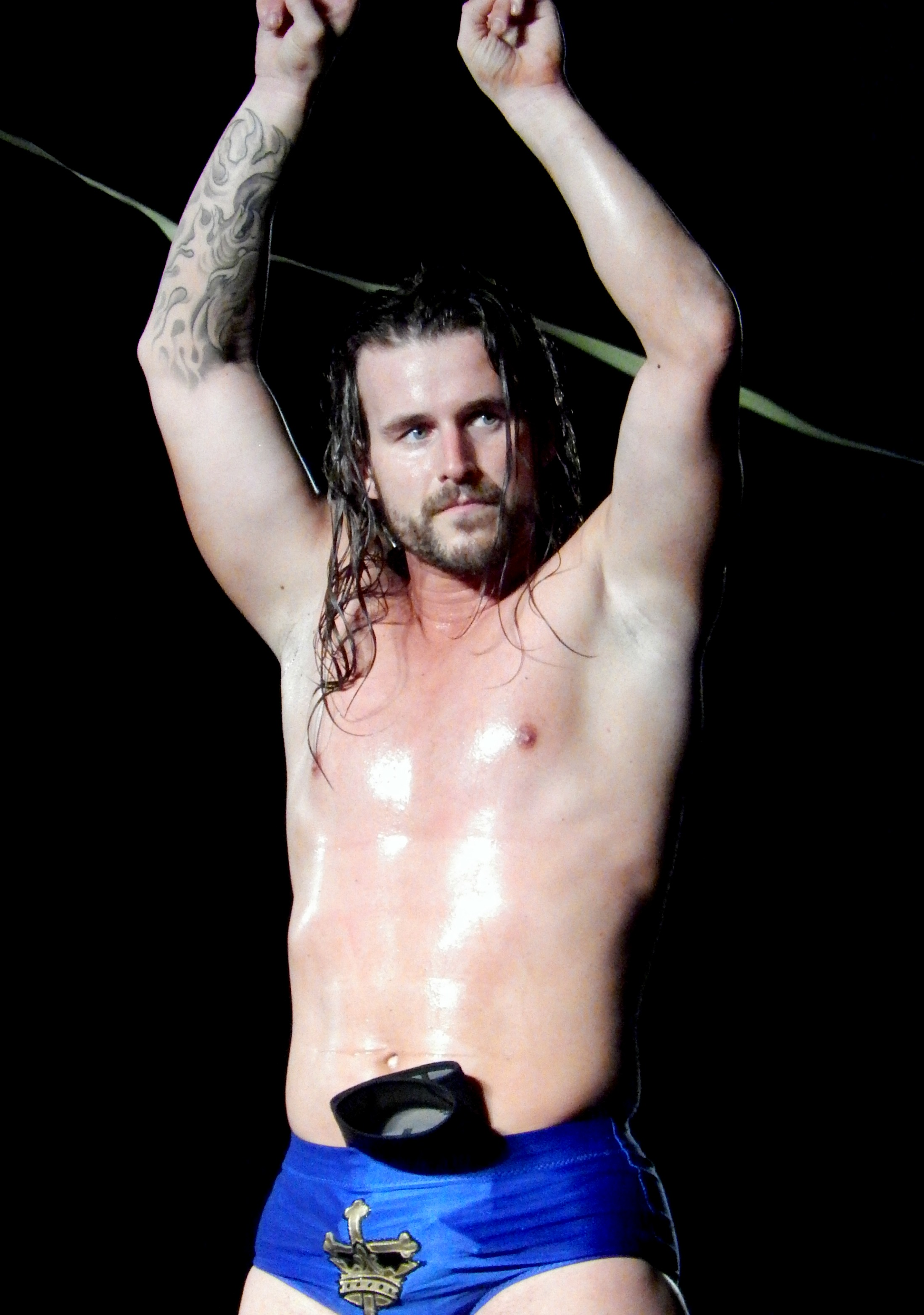
Adam Cole, who successfully defended the ROH World Championship at Destruction in Hiroshima

In the first title match of the show, Katsuyori Shibata defended the NEVER Openweight Championship against Bobby Fish. Throughout the match, Fish worked on Shibata's legitimately injured neck. At the end of the match, Shibata blocked Fish's brainbuster attempt, hit him with a headbutt and locked him in a sleeper hold, which he followed up with his finishing maneuver, the PK, to win the match and make his second successful defense of the NEVER Openweight Championship. After the match, Fish's reDRagon tag team partner Kyle O'Reilly entered the ring and challenged Shibata, which was accepted by the champion. Following the event, it was announced that Shibata would be taken off the rest of the tour and would be replaced in his scheduled tag team matches in Hiroshima and Kobe by Tomoaki Honma and Manabu Nakanishi, respectively.

In the main event of the show, Kushida made his sixth defense of the IWGP Junior Heavyweight Championship against Bushi. Bushi was accompanied to the match by an unidentified new member of his Los Ingobernables de Japón stable, who had debuted earlier in the week. The man interfered in the match and, after a ref bump, Tetsuya Naito, another one of Bushi's stablemates, entered the ring to also attack Kushida. He was, however, attacked and taken away from ringside by Michael Elgin. Towards the end of the match, Kushida went for his finishing hold, the Hoverboard Lock, but Bushi countered it into a Canadian Destroyer. Bushi then hit his finishing maneuver, the MX, twice to win the match and become the new IWGP Junior Heavyweight Champion, ending Kushida's nine-month reign.

=== Destruction in Hiroshima ===
The first title match of Destruction in Hiroshima saw the reigning IWGP Junior Heavyweight Tag Team Champions The Young Bucks challenge The Briscoe Brothers for the IWGP Tag Team Championship. Towards the end of the match, The Young Bucks went for their finishing maneuver, the Meltzer Driver, but Jay Briscoe countered it into a Jay Driller, after which he pinned Matt Jackson following the Doomsday Device to win the match and retain the title. After the match, The Briscoe Brothers were attacked by the previous IWGP Tag Team Champions, Tama Tonga and Tanga Loa, who demanded a title rematch. The next match saw Adam Cole defend the ROH World Championship against Will Ospreay. Cole retained the title after pinning Ospreay following the Panama Sunrise and the Last Shot. The following match saw reigning IWGP Heavyweight Champion Kazuchika Okada defeat Bad Luck Fale in a non-title match to avenge the loss he suffered during the 2016 G1 Climax.

The main event of the show featured Kenny Omega defending his contract for an IWGP Heavyweight Championship match at Wrestle Kingdom 11 against Yoshi-Hashi. The match featured outside interference from Omega's Bullet Club stablemates The Young Bucks. Towards the end of the match, Yoshi-Hashi landed his finishing maneuver, the Swanton Bomb, but Omega kicked out of the resulting pinfall attempt. Omega then hit Yoshi-Hashi with a reverse hurricanrana, a knee and then pinned him for the win with the Katayoku no Tenshi. After the match, Yoshi-Hashi's Chaos stablemate Hirooki Goto entered the ring to challenge Omega for his contract. Omega, who had defeated Goto in the finals of the 2016 G1 Climax, responded by telling him to "Go to Hell".

=== Destruction in Kobe ===
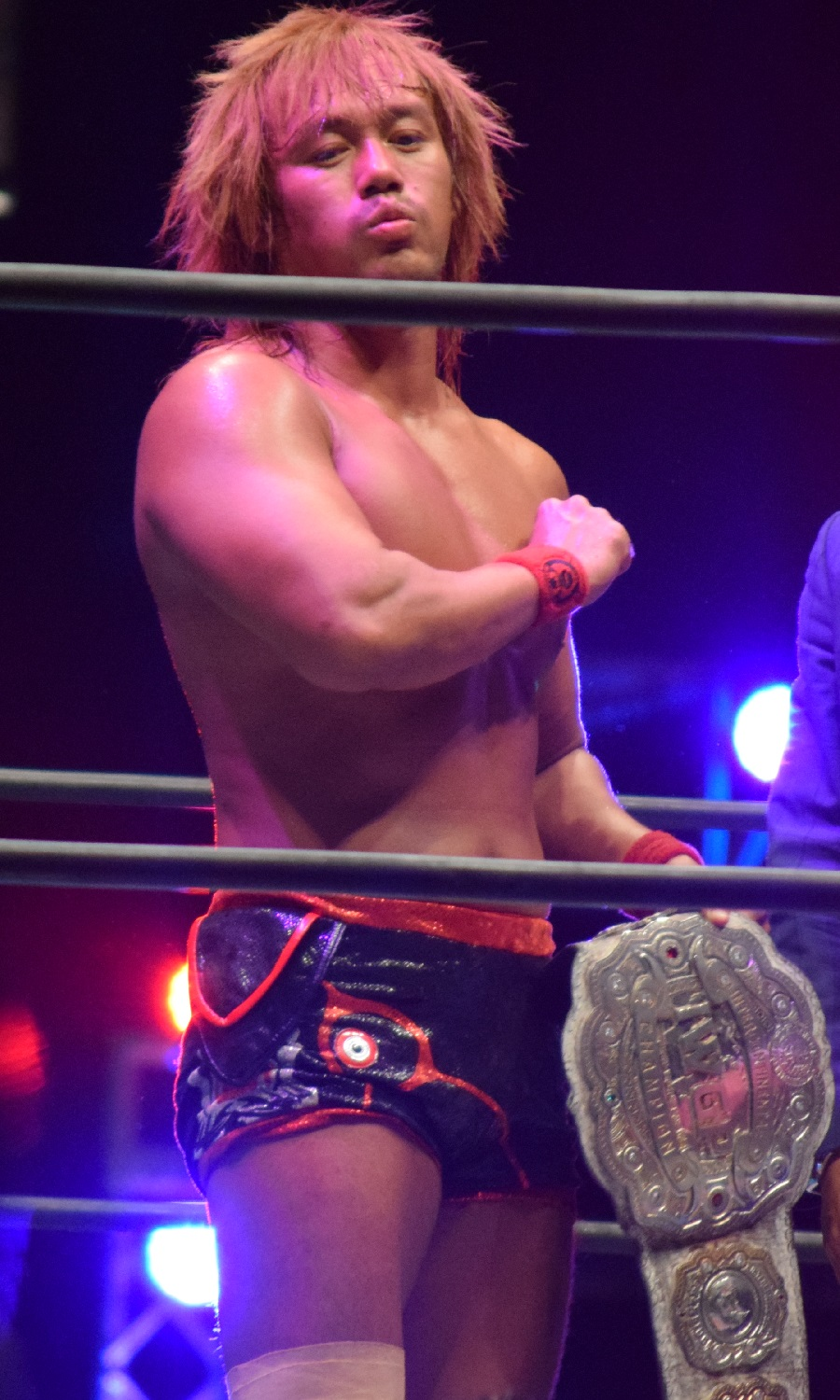
Tetsuya Naito, who captured the IWGP Intercontinental Championship in the main event of Destruction in Kobe

Prior to the match between the Hunter Club team of Yoshitatsu and Captain New Japan and the Bullet Club team of Chase Owens and Yujiro Takahashi, Yoshitatsu announced the result of his poll; fans had voted Captain out of the group. This led to Captain turning on Yoshitatsu, attacking him with Owens and Takahashi, ending the match in quick fashion. In a backstage interview, Bullet Club leader Kenny Omega welcomed Captain New Japan to the stable, but called his character ridiculous and told him to come up with a new name and costume. The first title match of the show featured the Bullet Club trio of Adam Cole, Matt Jackson and Nick Jackson taking on David Finlay, Ricochet and Satoshi Kojima for the vacant NEVER Openweight 6-Man Tag Team Championship. The match ended with Ricochet pinning Nick with a shooting star press to win the match and the title. Following the match, Finlay challenged The Young Bucks for the IWGP Junior Heavyweight Tag Team Championship in the ring, while backstage the new champions were challenged themselves by the Chaos trio of Beretta, Rocky Romero and Will Ospreay.

The semi-main event of the show saw the Chaos team of IWGP Heavyweight Champion Kazuchika Okada, Gedo, Jado and Yoshi-Hashi take on their stablemate Toru Yano and the Pro Wrestling Noah trio of Atsushi Kotoge, Daisuke Harada and Naomichi Marufuji. Yoshi-Hashi won the match for his team by pinning Harada for the win. Afterwards, Okada and Yoshi-Hashi challenged Yano and Marufuji to a match for their GHC Tag Team Championship on October 8, two days before Okada and Marufuji face off for the IWGP Heavyweight Championship. The main event of the show saw Michael Elgin defend the IWGP Intercontinental Championship against Tetsuya Naito. Late in the match, a ref bump led to outside interference from Naito's Los Ingobernables de Japón stablemates Bushi, Evil and Sanada as well as Hiroshi Tanahashi and Kushida, ending with Elgin powerbombing Bushi over the top rope onto his stablemates. Elgin then went to hit Naito with his finishing maneuver, the Elgin Bomb, but Naito countered it into his own finishing maneuver, Destino, then hit the move a second time to win the match and become the new IWGP Intercontinental Champion.

== Aftermath ==
The day after Destruction in Kobe, it was announced that with Captain New Japan joining Bullet Club, he would be known as "Bone Soldier" going forward. He made his debut under the name on October 8. That same day, David Finlay, Ricochet and Satoshi Kojima made their first successful defense of the NEVER Openweight 6-Man Tag Team Championship against the team that had challenged them backstage at Destruction in Kobe; Beretta, Rocky Romero and Will Ospreay. At a Pro Wrestling Noah show that same day, Gedo and Jado captured the GHC Junior Heavyweight Tag Team Championship from Atsushi Kotoge and Daisuke Harada, while Naomichi Marufuji and Toru Yano retained the GHC Tag Team Championship against Kazuchika Okada and Yoshi-Hashi.

On October 14, 2016, the Osaka Prefectural Police announced that Matt Sydal had been arrested at the Kansai International Airport upon trying to enter the country for Destruction in Hiroshima under suspicion of cannabis smuggling.

== Results ==
=== Destruction in Tokyo ===
No.	Results	Stipulations	Times
1	Roppongi Vice (Beretta and Rocky Romero) defeated David Finlay and Henare	Tag team match	05:57
2	Manabu Nakanishi and Yuji Nagata defeated Hunter Club (Captain New Japan and Yoshitatsu)	Tag team match	06:30
3	Tiger Mask, Togi Makabe and Tomoaki Honma defeated Hiroyoshi Tenzan, Jyushin Thunder Liger and Satoshi Kojima	Six-man tag team match	08:53
4	Chaos (Gedo, Hirooki Goto and Tomohiro Ishii) defeated Bullet Club (Chase Owens, Tama Tonga and Tanga Loa)	Six-man tag team match	11:05
5	Kyle O'Reilly defeated Juice Robinson	Singles match	12:59
6	Chaos (Kazuchika Okada, Will Ospreay and Yoshi-Hashi) (with Gedo) defeated Bullet Club (Bad Luck Fale, Kenny Omega and Yujiro Takahashi)	Six-man tag team match	11:31
7	Los Ingobernables de Japón (Evil, Sanada and Tetsuya Naito) defeated Hiroshi Tanahashi, Michael Elgin and Ryusuke Taguchi	Six-man tag team match	13:12
8	Katsuyori Shibata (c) defeated Bobby Fish (with Kyle O'Reilly)	Singles match for the NEVER Openweight Championship	16:41
9	Bushi defeated Kushida (c)	Singles match for the IWGP Junior Heavyweight Championship	21:03
(c) / – the champion(s) heading into the match

=== Destruction in Hiroshima ===
No.	Results	Stipulations	Times
1	Hiroyoshi Tenzan, Ricochet and Satoshi Kojima defeated Captain New Japan, Togi Makabe and Yoshitatsu	Six-man tag team match	08:20
2	Bobby Fish, David Finlay, Kyle O'Reilly and Ryusuke Taguchi defeated Manabu Nakanishi, Tiger Mask, Tomoaki Honma and Yuji Nagata	Eight-man tag team match	06:46
3	Guerrillas of Destiny (Tama Tonga and Tanga Loa) defeated Roppongi Vice (Beretta and Rocky Romero)	Tag team match	08:35
4	Chaos (Hirooki Goto and Tomohiro Ishii) defeated Bullet Club (Chase Owens and Yujiro Takahashi)	Tag team match	08:39
5	Hiroshi Tanahashi, Juice Robinson, Kushida and Michael Elgin defeated Los Ingobernables de Japón (Bushi, Evil, Sanada and Tetsuya Naito)	Eight-man tag team match	12:38
6	The Briscoe Brothers (Jay Briscoe and Mark Briscoe) (c) defeated The Young Bucks (Matt Jackson and Nick Jackson)	Tag team match for the IWGP Tag Team Championship	15:02
7	Adam Cole (c) defeated Will Ospreay	Singles match for the ROH World Championship	12:17
8	Kazuchika Okada (with Gedo) defeated Bad Luck Fale (with Yujiro Takahashi)	Singles match	17:03
9	Kenny Omega (with Matt Jackson and Nick Jackson) defeated Yoshi-Hashi (with Hirooki Goto)	Singles match for the Tokyo Dome IWGP Heavyweight Championship challenge rights certificate	24:44
(c) / – the champion(s) heading into the match

=== Destruction in Kobe ===
No.	Results	Stipulations	Times
1	Henare, Tiger Mask, and Ryusuke Taguchi defeated Chaos (Beretta, Rocky Romero and Will Ospreay)	Six-man tag team match	06:57
2	Bullet Club (Chase Owens and Yujiro Takahashi) defeated Hunter Club (Captain New Japan and Yoshitatsu)	Tag team match	00:48
3	G.B.H. (Togi Makabe and Tomoaki Honma) defeated Hiroyoshi Tenzan and Teruaki Kanemitsu	Tag team match	08:29
4	reDRagon (Bobby Fish and Kyle O'Reilly) defeated Manabu Nakanishi and Yuji Nagata	Tag team match	09:43
5	David Finlay, Ricochet and Satoshi Kojima defeated Bullet Club (Adam Cole, Matt Jackson and Nick Jackson)	Six-man tag team match for the vacant NEVER Openweight 6-Man Tag Team Championship	14:18
6	Bullet Club (Bad Luck Fale, Kenny Omega, Tama Tonga and Tanga Loa) defeated Chaos (Hirooki Goto, Jay Briscoe, Mark Briscoe and Tomohiro Ishii)	Eight-man tag team match	12:27
7	Los Ingobernables de Japón (Bushi, Evil and Sanada) defeated Hiroshi Tanahashi, Juice Robinson and Kushida	Six-man tag team match	12:55
8	Chaos (Gedo, Jado, Kazuchika Okada and Yoshi-Hashi) defeated Atsushi Kotoge, Daisuke Harada, Naomichi Marufuji and Toru Yano	Eight-man tag team match	11:31
9	Tetsuya Naito defeated Michael Elgin (c)	Singles match for the IWGP Intercontinental Championship	32:06
(c) / – the champion(s) heading into the match
