= Wrestle Kingdom =

New Japan Pro-Wrestling event series

- Promotions: New Japan Pro-Wrestling (2007–present); All Japan Pro Wrestling (2007); Pro Wrestling Noah (2022–2023)
- First event: Wrestle Kingdom I

Wrestle Kingdom is a professional wrestling event produced annually by New Japan Pro-Wrestling (NJPW), a Japan-based professional wrestling promotion.

Since 1992, NJPW has held their January 4 Tokyo Dome Show. The January 4 Tokyo Dome Show became NJPW's premier annual event and the biggest event in Japanese wrestling, similar to what WrestleMania is for WWE and American professional wrestling. It has been described as "the largest professional wrestling show in the world outside of the United States" and the "Japanese equivalent to the Super Bowl". From 1992 to 2006, the event was promoted under different names. In 2007, the event was rebranded as Wrestle Kingdom which has been the event name ever since.

From 2007 until 2019, Wrestle Kingdom was held on January 4 on Tokyo Dome, but the show expanded to two nights in 2020. Wrestle Kingdom 14 was the first one to include matches on January 5, and further expanded to include a third night (January 8) in 2022.

Wrestle Kingdom VI drew the highest single-day attendance since the annual event was branded as Wrestle Kingdom, at 43,000. Counting events held over two nights, Wrestle Kingdom 14 had the highest overall attendance, with 40,008 announced for night one and 30,063 for night two, a total of 70,071 attendees.

The lowest attendance was for Wrestle Kingdom 15, held under attendance restrictions due to COVID-19; NJPW announced an attendance of 12,689 for the first night and 7,801 for the second. Prior to COVID-19, the Wrestle Kingdom I and Wrestle Kingdom V events drew the lowest unofficial gates, with only 18,000 in attendance.

== Events ==
#	Event	Date	City	Venue	Main Event	Ref
1	Wrestle Kingdom I	January 4, 2007	Tokyo, Japan	Tokyo Dome	Keiji Muto and Masahiro Chono vs. Tencozy (Hiroyoshi Tenzan and Satoshi Kojima)	
2	Wrestle Kingdom II	January 4, 2008	Tokyo, Japan	Tokyo Dome	Hiroshi Tanahashi (c) vs. Shinsuke Nakamura for the IWGP Heavyweight Championship	
3	Wrestle Kingdom III	January 4, 2009	Tokyo, Japan	Tokyo Dome	Keiji Muto (c) vs. Hiroshi Tanahashi for the IWGP Heavyweight Championship	
4	Wrestle Kingdom IV	January 4, 2010	Tokyo, Japan	Tokyo Dome	Shinsuke Nakamura (c) vs. Yoshihiro Takayama for the IWGP Heavyweight Championship	
5	Wrestle Kingdom V	January 4, 2011	Tokyo, Japan	Tokyo Dome	Satoshi Kojima (c) vs. Hiroshi Tanahashi for the IWGP Heavyweight Championship	
6	Wrestle Kingdom VI	January 4, 2012	Tokyo, Japan	Tokyo Dome	Hiroshi Tanahashi (c) vs. Minoru Suzuki for the IWGP Heavyweight Championship	
7	Wrestle Kingdom 7	January 4, 2013	Tokyo, Japan	Tokyo Dome	Hiroshi Tanahashi (c) vs. Kazuchika Okada for the IWGP Heavyweight Championship	
8	Wrestle Kingdom 8	January 4, 2014	Tokyo, Japan	Tokyo Dome	Shinsuke Nakamura (c) vs. Hiroshi Tanahashi for the IWGP Intercontinental Championship	
9	Wrestle Kingdom 9	January 4, 2015	Tokyo, Japan	Tokyo Dome	Hiroshi Tanahashi (c) vs. Kazuchika Okada for the IWGP Heavyweight Championship	
10	Wrestle Kingdom 10	January 4, 2016	Tokyo, Japan	Tokyo Dome	Kazuchika Okada (c) vs. Hiroshi Tanahashi for the IWGP Heavyweight Championship	
11	Wrestle Kingdom 11	January 4, 2017	Tokyo, Japan	Tokyo Dome	Kazuchika Okada (c) vs. Kenny Omega for the IWGP Heavyweight Championship	
12	Wrestle Kingdom 12	January 4, 2018	Tokyo, Japan	Tokyo Dome	Kazuchika Okada (c) vs. Tetsuya Naito for the IWGP Heavyweight Championship	
13	Wrestle Kingdom 13	January 4, 2019	Tokyo, Japan	Tokyo Dome	Kenny Omega (c) vs. Hiroshi Tanahashi for the IWGP Heavyweight Championship	
14	Wrestle Kingdom 14	January 4, 2020	Tokyo, Japan	Tokyo Dome	Kazuchika Okada (c) vs. Kota Ibushi for the IWGP Heavyweight Championship	
14	Wrestle Kingdom 14	January 5, 2020	Tokyo, Japan	Tokyo Dome	Kazuchika Okada (Heavyweight) vs. Tetsuya Naito (Intercontinental) in a Double Gold Dash match for the IWGP Heavyweight Championship and IWGP Intercontinental Championship	
15	Wrestle Kingdom 15	January 4, 2021	Tokyo, Japan	Tokyo Dome	Tetsuya Naito (c) vs. Kota Ibushi for the IWGP Heavyweight Championship and IWGP Intercontinental Championship	
15	Wrestle Kingdom 15	January 5, 2021	Tokyo, Japan	Tokyo Dome	Kota Ibushi (c) vs. Jay White for the IWGP Heavyweight Championship and IWGP Intercontinental Championship	
16	Wrestle Kingdom 16	January 4, 2022	Tokyo, Japan	Tokyo Dome	Shingo Takagi (c) vs. Kazuchika Okada for the IWGP World Heavyweight Championship	
16	Wrestle Kingdom 16	January 5, 2022	Tokyo, Japan	Tokyo Dome	Kazuchika Okada (c) vs. Will Ospreay for the IWGP World Heavyweight Championship	
16	Wrestle Kingdom 16	January 8, 2022	Yokohama, Japan	Yokohama Arena	Kazuchika Okada and Hiroshi Tanahashi vs. Keiji Muto and Kaito Kiyomiya	
17	Wrestle Kingdom 17	January 4, 2023	Tokyo, Japan	Tokyo Dome	Jay White (c) vs. Kazuchika Okada for the IWGP World Heavyweight Championship	
17	Wrestle Kingdom 17	January 21, 2023	Yokohama, Japan	Yokohama Arena	Tetsuya Naito vs. Kenoh	
18	Wrestle Kingdom 18	January 4, 2024	Tokyo, Japan	Tokyo Dome	Sanada (c) vs. Tetsuya Naito for the IWGP World Heavyweight Championship	
19	Wrestle Kingdom 19	January 4, 2025	Tokyo, Japan	Tokyo Dome	Zack Sabre Jr. (c) vs. Shota Umino for the IWGP World Heavyweight Championship	
20	Wrestle Kingdom 20	January 4, 2026	Tokyo, Japan	Tokyo Dome	Hiroshi Tanahashi vs. Kazuchika Okada; This was Tanahashi's retirement match.	
21	Wrestle Kingdom 21	January 4, 2027	Tokyo, Japan	Tokyo Dome	Yota Tsuji (c) vs. Kenny Omega for the IWGP Heavyweight Championship	
(c) - refers to the champion(s) heading into the match

== See also ==
- List of New Japan Pro-Wrestling pay-per-view events
- Professional wrestling at the Tokyo Dome
