= Destruction '11 =

2011 wrestling event

- Promotional poster for the event featuring Hiroshi Tanahashi
- Promotion: New Japan Pro-Wrestling
- Date: October 10, 2011
- City: Tokyo, Japan
- Venue: Ryōgoku Kokugikan
- Attendance: 6,500

Pay-per-view chronology
← Previous; G1 Climax Special	Next → Power Struggle

Destruction chronology
← Previous '10	Next → '12

New Japan Pro-Wrestling events chronology
← Previous; Dominion 6.18	Next → Power Struggle

Destruction '11 was a professional wrestling pay-per-view (PPV) event promoted by New Japan Pro-Wrestling (NJPW). The event took place on October 10, 2011, in Tokyo, at Ryōgoku Kokugikan. The event featured eleven matches (including one dark match), three of which were contested for championships. It was the fifth event under the Destruction name.

== Storylines ==
Destruction '11 featured eleven professional wrestling matches that involved different wrestlers from pre-existing scripted feuds and storylines. Wrestlers portrayed villains, heroes, or less distinguishable characters in the scripted events that built tension and culminated in a wrestling match or series of matches.

== Event ==
The event saw two titles change hands; No Remorse Corps (Davey Richards and Rocky Romero) won the IWGP Junior Heavyweight Tag Team Championship for the first time by defeating Apollo 55 (Prince Devitt and Ryusuke Taguchi), while Masato Tanaka captured the IWGP Intercontinental Championship from inaugural champion, MVP. The event featured a surprise appearance by Yoshihiro Takayama, who attacked Togi Makabe after his match with Minoru Suzuki, setting up a match between the two for Wrestle Kingdom VI in Tokyo Dome. In the main event, Hiroshi Tanahashi successfully defended the IWGP Heavyweight Championship against Tetsuya Naito. Post-match, he was attacked by Toru Yano, who stole his title belt, setting up the title match between the two for Power Struggle.

== Results ==
No.	Results	Stipulations	Times
1^{D}	Hiromu Takahashi and Kyosuke Mikami defeated King Fale and Takaaki Watanabe	Tag team match	08:47
2	Kushida, Schwarz, Tiger Mask and Weiss defeated Chaos (Gedo, Jado, Takashi Iizuka and Tomohiro Ishii)	Eight-man tag team match	07:53
3	Yujiro Takahashi defeated Tomoaki Honma	Singles match	08:22
4	Lance Archer defeated Wataru Inoue	Singles match	07:39
5	Hirooki Goto and Tama Tonga defeated Shinsuke Nakamura and Último Guerrero	Tag team match	11:03
6	No Remorse Corps (Davey Richards and Rocky Romero) defeated Apollo 55 (Prince Devitt and Ryusuke Taguchi) (c)	Tag team match for the IWGP Junior Heavyweight Tag Team Championship	13:29
7	Satoshi Kojima defeated Hiroyoshi Tenzan	Singles match	10:08
8	Yuji Nagata defeated Toru Yano by submission	Singles match	12:08
9	Masato Tanaka defeated MVP (c)	Singles match for the IWGP Intercontinental Championship	12:30
10	Minoru Suzuki defeated Togi Makabe	Singles match	13:15
11	Hiroshi Tanahashi (c) defeated Tetsuya Naito	Singles match for the IWGP Heavyweight Championship	29:19
(c) / – the champion(s) heading into the match; D / – this was a dark match
