= Milano Collection A. T. =

Japanese professional wrestler

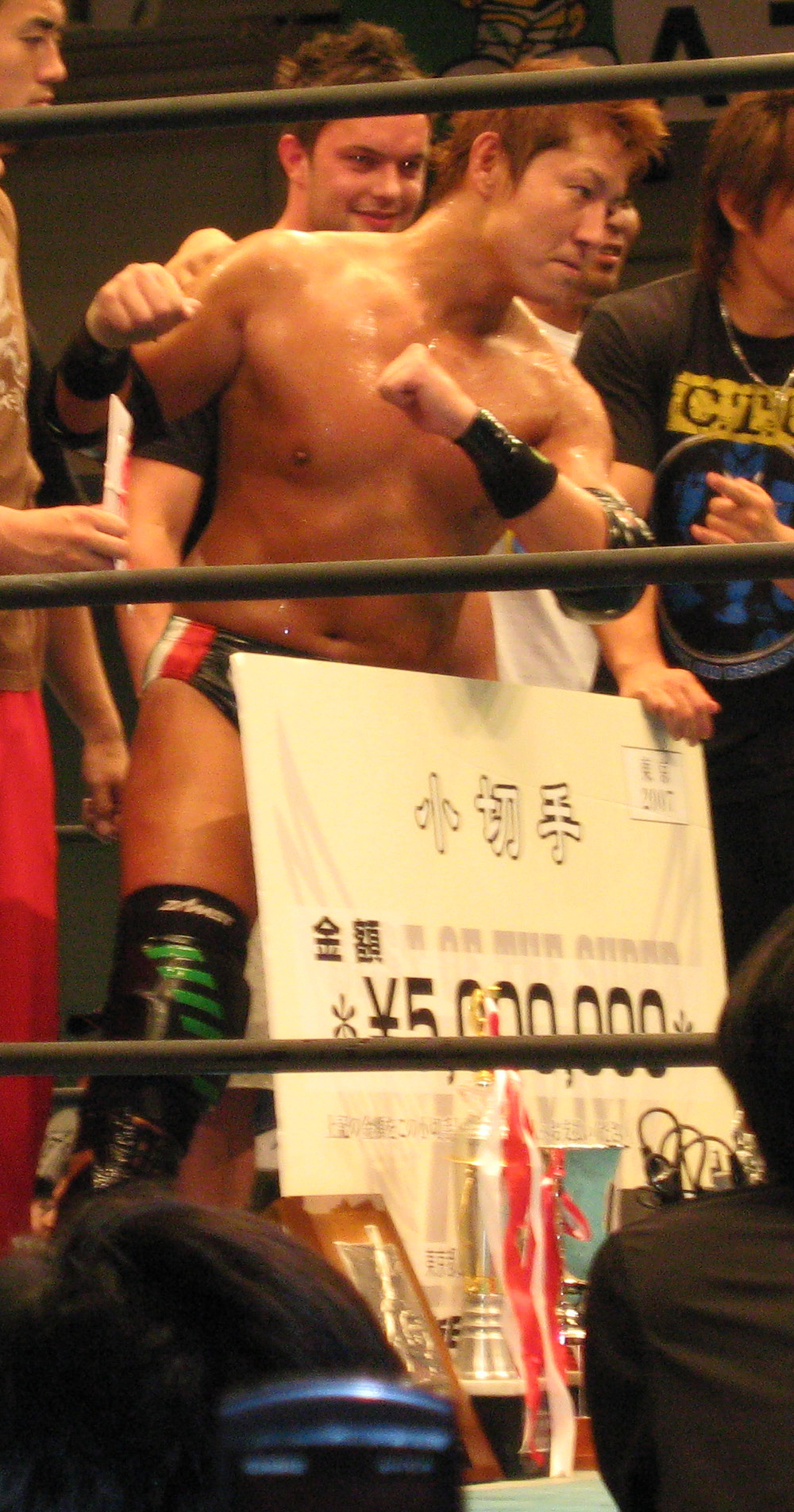
- Sawafuji as Milano Collection A. T. in June 2007, after winning the 2007 Best of the Super Juniors

Personal information
- Born: Akihito Terui (照井章仁, Terui Akihito); August 27, 1976 (age 50) Morioka, Iwate, Japan

Professional wrestling career
- Ring names: Akihito Terui; Masked Italiano; Milano Collection A. T.; Terui
- Billed height: 1.83 m (6 ft 0 in)
- Billed weight: 85 kg (187 lb)
- Billed from: Milan, Italy; San Antonio, Texas
- Trained by: Skayde; Magnum Tokyo; Último Dragón; Rudy Boy Gonzalez; Texas Wrestling Academy
- Debut: May 13, 2000
- Retired: January 18, 2010

Akihito Sawafuji (澤藤 章人, Sawafuji Akihito), born Akihito Terui (照井章仁, Terui Akihito; August 27, 1976), is a Japanese color commentator and retired professional wrestler, better known by his ring name Milano Collection A. T. (ミラノコレクションA.T., Mirano Korekushon Ē Tī). As Milano, Sawafuji adopted the gimmick of an Italian fashion aficionado/supermodel, reflected in his ring attire. Milano is also known for walking to the ring with an invisible dog known as Mikeru. After retiring from in-ring competition in 2010, Milano began working as a color commentator for New Japan Pro-Wrestling (NJPW), a position he maintains to this day.

== Professional wrestling career ==
=== Toryumon and Dragon Gate (2000–2005) ===
Sawafuji debuted in 2000 in Toryumon, where he later adopted the persona and ring name of Milano Collection A. T., an Italian fashion aficionado/supermodel, wearing lavish coats and trunks and walking to the ring with an invisible dog named Mikeru to much more success, and upon his arrival in Japan, he was the ace of Toryumon's T2P class. In 2002, he won the T2P Strongest Merit Assessment League defeating Masato Yoshino and received the International Light Heavyweight Championship for the win. He then went on to form the Italian Connection with Yossino and Yassini. The unit eventually added members Pescatore Yagi, Condotti Shuji, Anthony W. Mori and mascot Venezia. With the closure of T2P in July 2003, he joined the Toryumon main roster.

=== American excursion (2005–2006) ===
In mid-2006, he began training at the Texas Wrestling Academy in San Antonio, Texas at the urging of WWE's Shoichi Funaki, and trained under Rudy Boy Gonzalez. He also wrestled for many other American wrestling federations, including East Coast Wrestling Association, Ring of Honor (ROH), NWA Anarchy, Chikara and Total Nonstop Action Wrestling (TNA), where he took part in the 2008 World X Cup as part of Team Japan, winning his first and only singles match for TNA against Curry Man, gaining 2 points for his team. He then competed at Victory Road in the third round, which was a four team triple elimination match, dominating early in the match before getting eliminated.

=== New Japan Pro-Wrestling (2007–present) ===
After returning to Japan full time in 2007, he began working for New Japan Pro-Wrestling (NJPW) as a part of the R.I.S.E. faction. He received his first title opportunity in New Japan on November 6, 2006, unsuccessfully challenging Tiger Mask IV for the NWA World Junior Heavyweight Championship. He achieved his greatest success in both New Japan and as a professional wrestler in 2007 when he won New Japan Pro-Wrestling's Best of the Super Juniors tournament, defeating Wataru Inoue in the final. However, he did not receive the customary shot at the IWGP Junior Heavyweight Championship (which instead went to Ryusuke Taguchi), due to graduating to the heavyweight division. In August, he took part in the G1 Climax, finishing with 2 wins and 4 points. In November, he teamed with Hirooki Goto as R.I.S.E in the G1 Tag League, making it to the semi-finals where they were eliminated by Hiroshi Tanahashi and Koji Kanemoto.

On January 18, 2010, Sawafuji announced his retirement from professional wrestling because of inferior oblique muscle palsy, brought on by an excessively strong thrust kick to the eye by Gedo. A retirement ceremony was held on February 14.

Sawafuji remains with New Japan as a member of the IWGP Championship Committee and a color commentator.

== As a trainer ==
Sawafuji is currently a trainer for World Wonder Ring Stardom.

=== Wrestlers trained ===
- Aya Sakura
- Giulia
- Hanako
- Miyu Amasaki
- Yuzuki

== Championships and accomplishments ==
- Chikara
  - ICW/ICWA Tex-Arkana Television Championship (1 time)
- Dragon Gate
  - Open the Triangle Gate Championship (1 time) – with Anthony W. Mori and Yossino
  - Rey de Parejas (2004) – with Anthony W. Mori and Yossino
- New Japan Pro-Wrestling
  - Best of the Super Juniors (2007)
- NWA Florida
  - Jeff Peterson Memorial Cup (2006)
- Pro Wrestling Illustrated
  - PWI ranked him #61 of the top 500 singles wrestlers in the PWI 500 in 2007
- Texas Wrestling Entertainment
  - TWE Television Championship (1 time)
- Toryumon
  - International Light Heavyweight Championship (1 time)
  - UWA World Trios Championship (2 times) – with Brother Yasini and Yossino (1), and Yossino and Condotti Shuji (1)
  - T2P Strongest League (2002)
  - Young Dragons Cup (2000)
