= Destruction in Kobe (2014) =

2014 professional wrestling event

- Promotional poster for the event, featuring various NJPW wrestlers
- Promotion: New Japan Pro-Wrestling
- Date: September 21, 2014
- City: Kobe, Japan
- Venue: Kobe World Memorial Hall
- Attendance: 8,000

Pay-per-view chronology
← Previous; G1 Climax 24	Next → Destruction in Okayama

Destruction chronology
← Previous; 2013	Next → Okayama 2014

New Japan Pro-Wrestling events chronology
← Previous; Dominion 6.21	Next → Destruction in Okayama

Destruction in Kobe (2014) was a professional wrestling pay-per-view (PPV) event promoted by New Japan Pro-Wrestling (NJPW). The event took place on September 21, 2014, in Kobe, Hyōgo at the Kobe World Memorial Hall. The event featured ten matches, three of which were contested for championships. It was the eighth event under the Destruction name and the final NJPW internet pay-per-view broadcast internationally by Ustream.

== Production ==
=== Storylines ===
Destruction in Kobe featured ten professional wrestling matches that involved different wrestlers from pre-existing scripted feuds and storylines. Wrestlers portrayed villains, heroes, or less distinguishable characters in the scripted events that built tension and culminated in a wrestling match or series of matches.

Originally announced top matches of the event saw Kushida defend the IWGP Junior Heavyweight Championship against Ryusuke Taguchi, Hiroshi Tanahashi and Katsuyori Shibata face off in a 2014 G1 Climax rematch and Bad Luck Fale make his first defense of the IWGP Intercontinental Championship against previous champion Shinsuke Nakamura. Nakamura had defeated Fale during the 2014 G1 Climax, taking himself to the finals and eliminating Fale from the tournament. On September 8, NJPW announced that a match between Bullet Club's Doc Gallows and Karl Anderson and Chaos' Kazuchika Okada and Yoshi-Hashi would be contested for the former's IWGP Tag Team Championship, instead of being the non-title match it was first announced as. This came as a result of Yoshi-Hashi leading Chaos to a ten-man elimination tag team match win over Bullet Club on September 5, after which he challenged Yujiro Takahashi to a match for his NEVER Openweight Championship, while Okada added his own IWGP Tag Team Championship challenge to Gallows and Anderson.

== Event ==
The event featured several matches in the ongoing storyline rivalry between the Chaos and Bullet Club stables, including the opening six-man tag team match, where Chaos' Alex Koslov, Rocky Romero and Tomohiro Ishii defeated Bullet Club's Matt Jackson, Nick Jackson and Yujiro Takahashi. Also featured during the event was Toru Yano's rivalry with his former partner Takashi Iizuka, which had also branched into a rivalry between Yano's new partner Kazushi Sakuraba and Iizuka's Suzuki-gun stablemate Minoru Suzuki. During the event, the two teams faced off in a tag team match, where Yano cheated his way to a win over Iizuka. The first title match of the event saw Ryusuke Taguchi defeat Kushida to win the IWGP Junior Heavyweight Championship for the second time in his career and first time in seven years, becoming the 69th champion. Following the match, Taguchi and Kushida shook hands, before they were attacked by the Suzuki-gun trio of El Desperado, Taichi and Taka Michinoku, building up an IWGP Junior Heavyweight Tag Team Championship match between Kushida and Alex Shelley, the Time Splitters, and El Desperado and Taichi at Destruction in Okayama.

In the second title match, Bullet Club's Doc Gallows and Karl Anderson made their sixth successful defense of the IWGP Tag Team Championship against Chaos' Kazuchika Okada and Yoshi-Hashi, after Yujiro Takahashi interfered to attack his upcoming NEVER Openweight Championship challenger Yoshi-Hashi. The event also featured two big singles match between some of NJPW's top heavyweights. In the matches, Togi Makabe and his tag team partner Hiroshi Tanahashi defeated Hirooki Goto and his tag team partner Katsuyori Shibata, respectively. Following his win, Tanahashi announced he was ending his one-year-long self-imposed exile from the IWGP Heavyweight Championship picture and was now looking to get a shot at Bullet Club's reigning champion A.J. Styles. In the main event of the show, Chaos' Shinsuke Nakamura defeated Bullet Club's Bad Luck Fale to regain the IWGP Intercontinental Championship, winning it for the record-setting fourth time.

== Reception ==
Dave Meltzer of the Wrestling Observer Newsletter called the match between Hiroshi Tanahashi and Katsuyori Shibata a "must-see", writing "[i]t crossed the line for me as far as stiffness goes, and kind of bugs me because Tanahashi is smart enough to know the pitfalls of that kind of a match and following it. But as far as what they did when it comes to doing a simulated fight, it was incredible". The match was eventually given a rare five-star rating by Meltzer.

== Aftermath ==
On September 30, Ustream announced it had ended its pay-per-view service, making Destruction in Kobe NJPW's final event broadcast by its largest international internet pay-per-view provider.

== Results ==
No.	Results	Stipulations	Times
1	Chaos (Alex Koslov, Rocky Romero and Tomohiro Ishii) defeated Bullet Club (Matt Jackson, Nick Jackson and Yujiro Takahashi)	Six-man tag team match	07:51
2	Alex Shelley, Bushi and Máximo defeated Suzuki-gun (El Desperado, Taichi and Taka Michinoku) by disqualification	Six-man tag team match	02:43
3	Hiroyoshi Tenzan, Jyushin Thunder Liger, Satoshi Kojima and Tomoaki Honma defeated Captain New Japan, Manabu Nakanishi, Tiger Mask and Yuji Nagata	Eight-man tag team match	05:22
4	Kazushi Sakuraba and Toru Yano defeated Suzuki-gun (Minoru Suzuki and Takashi Iizuka)	Tag team match	11:34
5	Ryusuke Taguchi defeated Kushida (c) by submission	Singles match for the IWGP Junior Heavyweight Championship	14:55
6	Kota Ibushi and Tetsuya Naito defeated Bullet Club (A.J. Styles and Tama Tonga)	Tag team match	12:57
7	Bullet Club (Doc Gallows and Karl Anderson) (c) defeated Chaos (Kazuchika Okada and Yoshi-Hashi)	Tag team match for the IWGP Tag Team Championship	12:57
8	Togi Makabe defeated Hirooki Goto	Singles match	14:38
9	Hiroshi Tanahashi defeated Katsuyori Shibata	Singles match	17:57
10	Shinsuke Nakamura defeated Bad Luck Fale (c) (with Matt Jackson and Nick Jackson)	Singles match for the IWGP Intercontinental Championship	19:13
(c) / – the champion(s) heading into the match
