= Destruction in Okayama (2014) =

NJPW professional wrestling pay-per-view event

- Promotional poster for the event, featuring various NJPW wrestlers
- Promotion: New Japan Pro-Wrestling
- Date: September 23, 2014
- City: Okayama, Japan
- Venue: Convex Okayama
- Attendance: 3,600

Pay-per-view chronology
← Previous; Destruction in Kobe	Next → King of Pro-Wrestling

Destruction chronology
← Previous; Kobe 2014	Next → Okayama 2015

Destruction in Okayama (2014) was a professional wrestling pay-per-view (PPV) event promoted by New Japan Pro-Wrestling (NJPW). The event took place on September 23, 2014, in Okayama at the Convex Okayama. The event featured ten matches, three of which were contested for a championship. It was the ninth event under the Destruction name.

Due to Ustream getting out of the PPV business, Destruction in Okayama was the first NJPW PPV in two years that was not available internationally.

== Storylines ==
Destruction in Okayama featured ten professional wrestling matches that involved different wrestlers from pre-existing scripted feuds and storylines. Wrestlers portrayed villains, heroes, or less distinguishable characters in the scripted events that built tension and culminated in a wrestling match or series of matches.

Originally announced top matches of the event saw Time Splitters (Alex Shelley and Kushida) defend the IWGP Junior Heavyweight Tag Team Championship against Suzuki-gun representatives El Desperado and Taichi and Kazuchika Okada defend his certificate for an IWGP Heavyweight Championship match at Wrestle Kingdom 9 in Tokyo Dome against Karl Anderson. Okada earned the certificate by winning the 2014 G1 Climax in August. During the tournament, he suffered two losses, one of which was against Anderson. The card was revamped on September 8 with the addition of two more title matches. In the first Tencozy were set to defend the NWA World Tag Team Championship against Manabu Nakanishi and Yuji Nagata. The match came as a result of Nagata challenging Tencozy after he and Nakanishi had defeated the champions in a non-title main event on September 7. The second, which was originally announced as a non-title match, would feature Yujiro Takahashi defending the NEVER Openweight Championship against Yoshi-Hashi. This change came as a result of Yoshi-Hashi leading the Chaos stable to a win over their rival Bullet Club stable in a ten-man elimination tag team match on September 5, scoring the last elimination over Takahashi.

== Event ==
In the first title match of the event, the Time Splitters made their second successful defense of the IWGP Junior Heavyweight Tag Team Championship against El Desperado and Taichi. Post-match, the champions were challenged by both the Forever Hooligans (Alex Koslov and Rocky Romero) and The Young Bucks (Matt Jackson and Nick Jackson). Before the next match, NJPW played a vignette, where National Wrestling Alliance (NWA) president Bruce Tharpe announced that the NWA World Junior Heavyweight Champion Chase Owens would be taking part in NJPW's King of Pro-Wrestling event on October 13. After the video had ended, Bushi entered the ring to request a title match against Owens. The second title match saw Tencozy make their fourth successful defense of the NWA World Tag Team Championship against the team of Manabu Nakanishi and Yuji Nagata. In the third and final title match of the event, Yoshi-Hashi failed in his second attempt at a championship win in two days, when Yujiro Takahashi defeated him to make his first successful defense of the NEVER Openweight Championship. Afterwards, Takahashi was confronted by Yoshi-Hashi's stablemate, the previous NEVER Openweight Champion Tomohiro Ishii. In the semi-main event, Hiroshi Tanahashi and Tetsuya Naito defeated Bullet Club's IWGP Heavyweight Champion A.J. Styles and IWGP Tag Team Champion Doc Gallows. Following the match, Styles accepted Tanahashi's challenge for an IWGP Heavyweight Championship match between the two. In the main event of the evening, Kazuchika Okada successfully defended his Tokyo Dome IWGP Heavyweight Championship challenge rights certificate against Karl Anderson. Following his win, Okada named Tetsuya Naito, the other man who had defeated him during the 2014 G1 Climax, as his next challenger.

== Results ==
No.	Results	Stipulations	Times
1	Bushi, Captain New Japan, Ryusuke Taguchi defeated Jyushin Thunder Liger, Máximo and Tiger Mask	Six-man tag team match	05:05
2	The Young Bucks (Matt Jackson and Nick Jackson) defeated Forever Hooligans (Alex Koslov and Rocky Romero)	Tag team match	09:57
3	Gedo, Kazushi Sakuraba and Toru Yano defeated Suzuki-gun (Minoru Suzuki, Taka Michinoku and Takashi Iizuka)	Six-man tag team match	05:51
4	Meiyu Tag (Hirooki Goto and Katsuyori Shibata) defeated G.B.H. (Togi Makabe and Tomoaki Honma)	Tag team match	07:31
5	Time Splitters (Alex Shelley and Kushida) (c) defeated Suzuki-gun (El Desperado and Taichi) (with Taka Michinoku)	Tag team match for the IWGP Junior Heavyweight Tag Team Championship	15:01
6	Chaos (Shinsuke Nakamura and Tomohiro Ishii) defeated Bullet Club (Tama Tonga and Bad Luck Fale)	Tag team match	11:44
7	Tencozy (Hiroyoshi Tenzan and Satoshi Kojima) (c) defeated Manabu Nakanishi and Yuji Nagata	Tag team match for the NWA World Tag Team Championship	15:08
8	Yujiro Takahashi (c) (with Mao) defeated Yoshi-Hashi (with Shinsuke Nakamura and Tomohiro Ishii)	Singles match for the NEVER Openweight Championship	13:29
9	Hiroshi Tanahashi and Tetsuya Naito defeated Bullet Club (A.J. Styles and Doc Gallows)	Tag team match	13:15
10	Kazuchika Okada (with Gedo) defeated Karl Anderson (with Yujiro Takahashi)	Singles match for the Tokyo Dome IWGP Heavyweight Championship challenge rights certificate	19:55
(c) / – the champion(s) heading into the match
