= Chaos (professional wrestling) =

Professional wrestling stable

- The last logo of Chaos

Stable
- Members: See below
- Name: Chaos
- Former members: See below
- Debut: April 23, 2009
- Disbanded: March 6, 2025
- Years active: 2009–2025

Chaos, often stylized as CHAOS, was a professional wrestling stable performing in New Japan Pro-Wrestling (NJPW). The group was formed in 2009, when nearly all the members of the Great Bash Heel (G.B.H) stable turned on leader Togi Makabe and reformed under new leader Shinsuke Nakamura. Soon after, the new group was named Chaos, with Nakamura as the leader. As the leader of Chaos, Nakamura was one of NJPW's top wrestlers, winning the IWGP Heavyweight Championship and the IWGP Intercontinental Championship as well as the 2011 G1 Climax and the 2014 New Japan Cup.

Since its founding, Chaos has added several new members, including Kazuchika Okada, who has held the IWGP Heavyweight Championship five times and won the G1 Climax tournament in 2012, 2014 and 2021, as well as the 2013 and 2019 New Japan Cup. Okada became the leader of Chaos after Nakamura's departure from New Japan and succeeded Hiroshi Tanahashi as the promotion's "ace", or top star. Rocky Romero, another member of Chaos, won the IWGP Junior Heavyweight Tag Team Championship a record eight times.

Chaos originally was the only villainous group in New Japan. In 2013, Chaos started feuds with two other villainous groups, Suzuki-gun and Bullet Club, which led to the stable being portrayed in a more sympathetic way. After Takashi Iizuka and Yujiro Takahashi jumped to Suzuki-gun and Bullet Club respectively, Chaos finalized its transition into full fan favorites. From 2021 to 2024, Chaos were represented in American promotion All Elite Wrestling (AEW), when Best Friends, initially consisting of Chuck Taylor and Trent Beretta, rejoined the stable. This also saw Chaos gain their first female member in Kris Statlander. Aside from an appearance from Tomohiro Ishii, Chaos' NJPW representative in AEW was Romero, who usually acted as wrestler and manager for the stable.

On March 6, 2025, at the NJPW 53rd Anniversary Show, both Chaos and GBH were folded into Main Unit, officially ending the tenure of the stable.

== History ==
=== Under Shinsuke Nakamura (2009–2016) ===
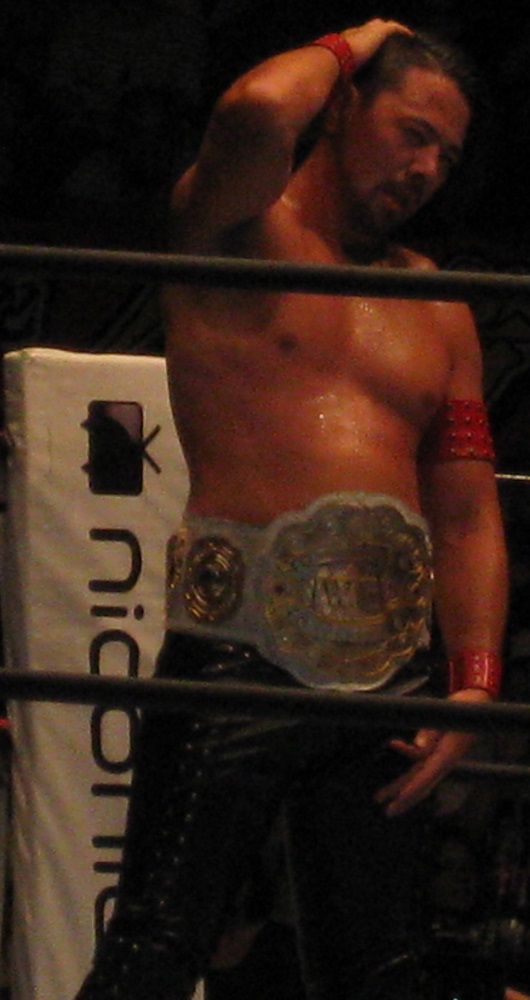
Shinsuke Nakamura, founder and first leader of Chaos

On April 5, 2009, Toru Yano turned on Great Bash Heel (G.B.H) leader Togi Makabe, costing Makabe his match against Shinsuke Nakamura. Throughout that month, all members of G.B.H besides Tomoaki Honma turned their backs on Makabe, joining Nakamura and Yano. On April 23, the group was officially dubbed Chaos, with Nakamura and Yano positioned as its two central figures.

After Chaos was formed, members Giant Bernard and Karl Anderson (collective known as Bad Intentions), received a shot at the IWGP Tag Team Championship, but were unable to defeat the defending champions Team 3D (Brother Ray and Brother Devon). Also on that day, Black Tiger V was defeated by Tiger Mask in a mask vs. mask match and afterwards it was revealed to be Tatsuhito Takaiwa by removing his mask and leaving the stable.

==== Championship success ====
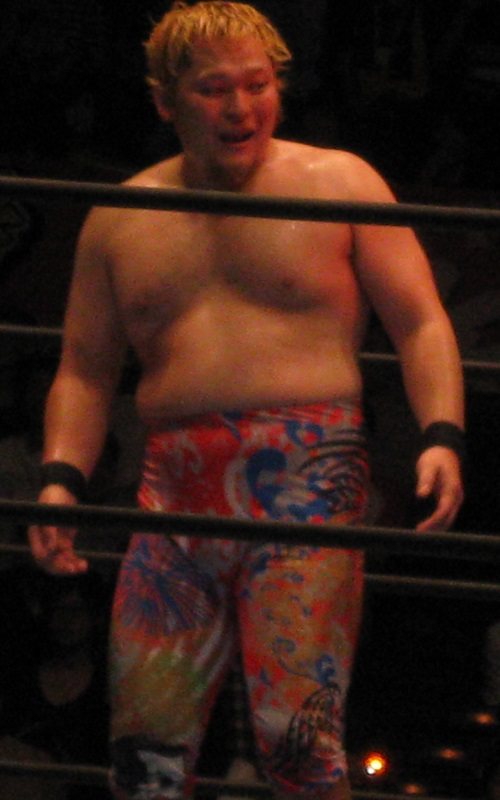
Toru Yano, the first member of Great Bash Heel to turn on Togi Makabe to join Nakamura

On September 27, Nakamura defeated Togi Makabe in a decision match to win the IWGP Heavyweight Championship for the third time. Upon winning the title, Nakamura drew the ire of Antonio Inoki by announcing his plan of wanting to restore the "Strong Style" of New Japan by capturing the original IWGP Heavyweight Championship belt from Inoki to replace the fourth generation title belt Nakamura himself had. From October 17 to November 1, Chaos participated at the 2009 G1 Tag League, during which Chaos members Bad Intentions (Bernard and Anderson) defeated Apollo 55 (Prince Devitt and Ryusuke Taguchi) in the finals to win the tournament.

On January 4, 2010, at Wrestle Kingdom IV in Tokyo Dome, Bad Intentions received a match for the IWGP Tag Team Championship, but lost to No Limit (Tetsuya Naito and Yujiro Takahashi) in a three-way hardcore tag team match also involving Team 3D (Brother Devon and Brother Ray). Later that night, Nakamura successfully defended the IWGP Heavyweight Championship against Yoshihiro Takayama in a rematch of their 2004 Tokyo Dome title unification bout. After defeating Takayama, Nakamura was challenged by Manabu Nakanishi, whom he pinned on February 14 at New Japan's ISM show in Sumo Hall.

On April 4, Yano and Iizuka turned on Anderson and kicked him out of the stable with help from Tetsuya Naito and Yujiro Takahashi, who joined the stable in the process. Giant Bernard, who was not present at the show, left Chaos alongside his tag team partner. On May 3 at Wrestling Dontaku 2010, Yano defeating Tanahashi in a singles match while Naito and Takahashi lost the IWGP Tag Team Championship to Seigigun (Wataru Inoue and Yuji Nagata) in a match also involving Bad Intentions (Giant Bernard and Karl Anderson), and Nakamura lost the IWGP Heavyweight Championship to Togi Makabe in the main event. Following the loss, Nakamura was sidelined with a shoulder injury until he returned on June 19 at Dominion 6.19, defeating Daniel Puder and being eyed up by Simon Inoki and Atsushi Sawada of Inoki Genome Federation, who appeared at the show.

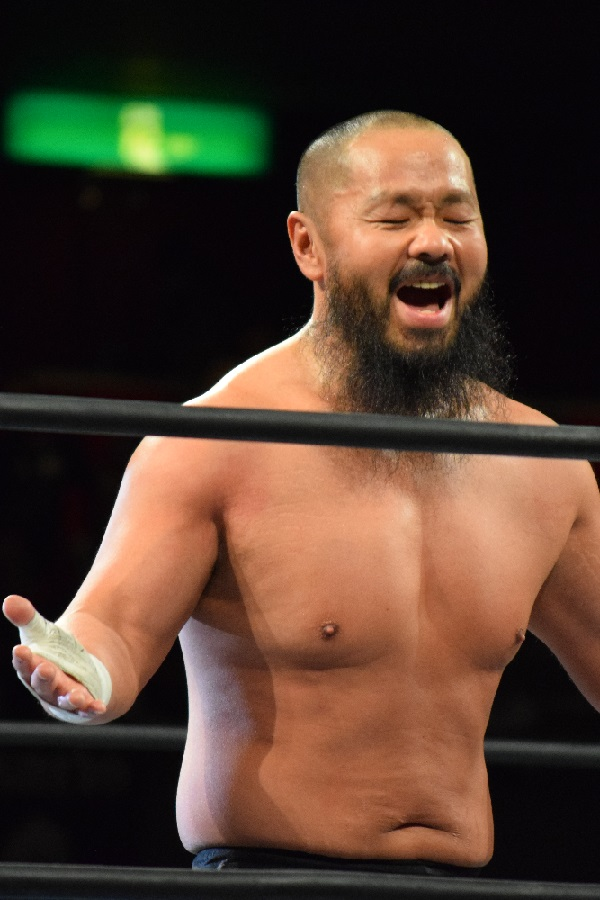
Gedo

On July 19, Nakamura received a rematch for the IWGP Heavyweight Championship, but was once again defeated by Makabe. From August 6 to August 15, Yano, Naito, Takahashi and Nakamura participated at the 2010 G1 Climax. Nakamura won four out of his seven-round robin stage matches, including one over eventual winner Satoshi Kojima and was leading his block heading to the final day, where he wrestled Pro Wrestling Noah's Go Shiozaki to a 30-minute time limit draw and thus missed the finals of the tournament by a single point. The draw with Shiozaki led to a no time limit match at a Pro Wrestling Noah show on August 22, where Nakamura was defeated. On November 13, Jado and Gedo defeated their Chaos teammates Davey Richards and Rocky Romero in the finals of a five-day-long tournament to win the 2010 Super J Tag League. As a result of their victory, Gedo and Jado received a match for the IWGP Junior Heavyweight Tag Team Championship, which took place at a Dramatic Dream Team event on December 26, where they were defeated by defending champions Golden☆Lovers (Kenny Omega and Kota Ibushi).

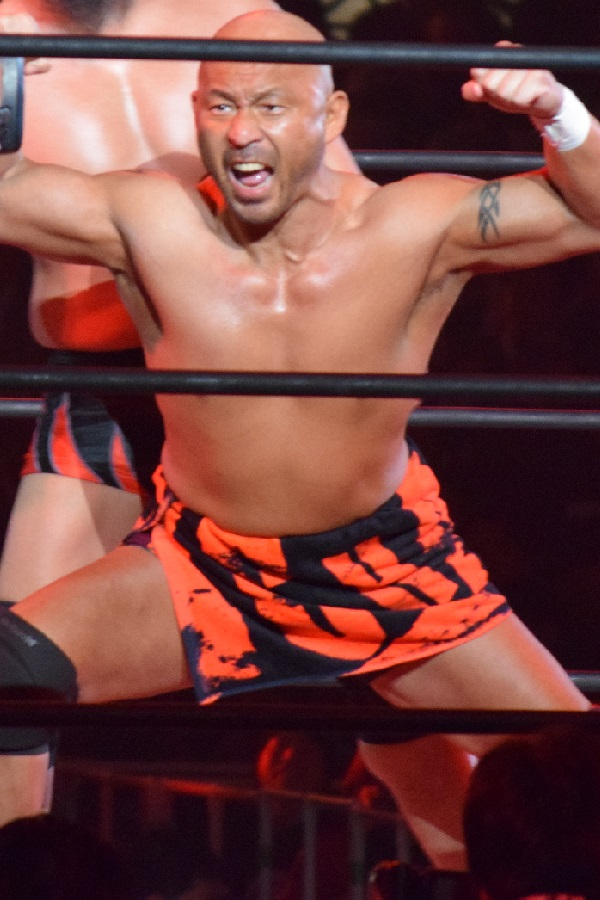
Jado

On January 4, 2011, at the Wrestle Kingdom V in Tokyo Dome, Naito unsuccessfully challenged Jeff Hardy for the TNA World Heavyweight Championship, but Nakamura avenged his loss to Go Shiozaki by defeating him in a singles match later that night. On May 26, Takahashi and all Chaos members turned on Naito and kicked him out of the group.

On June 18, Mitsuhide Hirasawa turned on Seigigun and its leader Yuji Nagata, renaming himself "Hideo Saito" and joining Chaos. From August 1 to August 14, Yano, Takahashi, Saito and Nakamura participated in the 2011 G1 Climax, which Nakamura won by defeating Tetsuya Naito on August 14 and earning another shot at the IWGP Heavyweight Championship. On September 19, Saito lost to Nagata in a grudge match, but attacked Nagata after the match. Later that night, Nakamura went on to challenge for the IWGP Heavyweight Championship, but failed to recapture the title from Hiroshi Tanahashi. On October 10 at Destruction '11, Richards and Romero defeated Prince Devitt and Ryusuke Taguchi to win the IWGP Junior Heavyweight Tag Team Championship for the first time. Later that night, Yano lost to Nagata in a rematch, but later attacked Tanahashi after he had successfully defended the IWGP Heavyweight Championship against Tetsuya Naito and then accepted Nagata as his next challenger, stealing his championship belt and renaming it the "YWGP Heavyweight Championship". Also later that night, Tanaka defeated MVP to win the IWGP Intercontinental Championship.

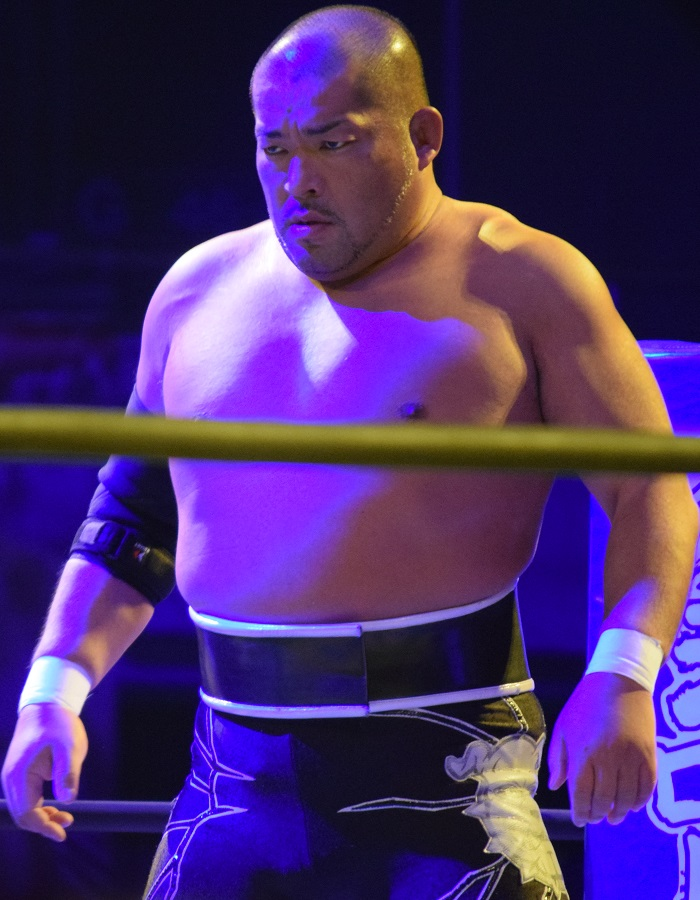
Tomohiro Ishii

From October 22 to November 6, Tanaka and Takahashi, Saito and Iizuka, Nakamura and Yano (who named their team "Chaos Top Team") and Ishii with Don Fujii participated at the 2011 G1 Tag League. On November 6, Nakamura and Yano were eliminated from the tournament in the semifinals by Lance Archer and Minoru Suzuki. On November 12 at Power Struggle, Richards and Romero defeated Kushida and Tiger Mask to retain the IWGP Junior Heavyweight Tag Team Championship. Later that night, Tanaka made his first successful title defense against Hirooki Goto. In the main event, Yano failed to capture the IWGP Heavyweight Championship from Tanahashi. As a result of pinning Prince Devitt during the IWGP Junior Heavyweight Tag Team Championship match, Richards was granted another shot for the IWGP Junior Heavyweight Championship on December 4, but failed in his attempt to become a double champion. Also on December 4, Tanaka defeated MVP in a rematch to retain the IWGP Intercontinental Championship with help from Yujiro Takahashi . That same night, Saito's erratic behaviour and poor match results eventually led to the rest of Chaos kicking him out of the stable. On December 28, Yoshi-Hashi joined the stable.

==== Kazuchika Okada's rise to stardom ====
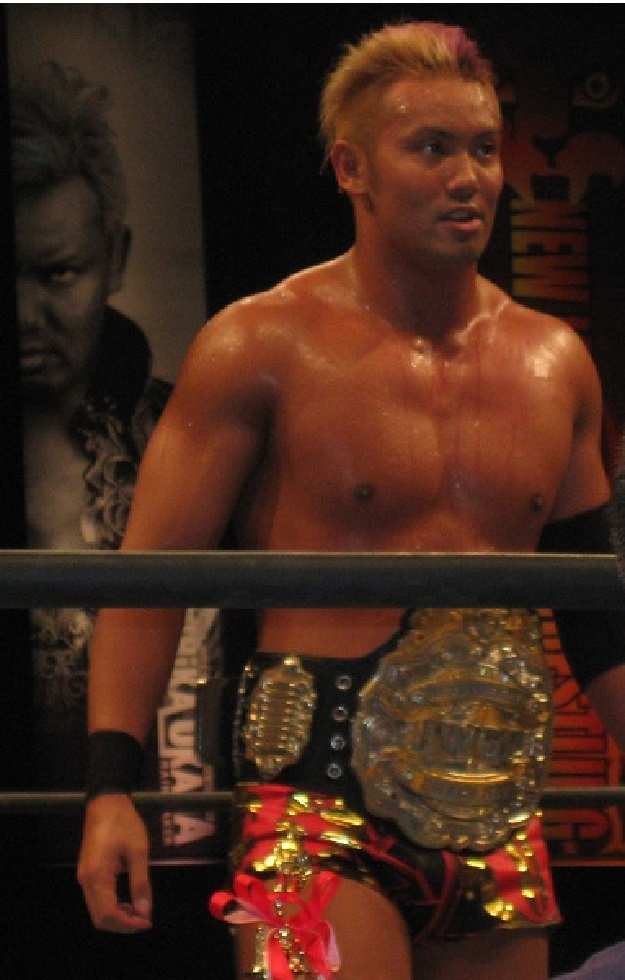
Kazuchika Okada

On January 4, 2012, at Wrestle Kingdom VI in Tokyo Dome, Richards and Romero lost the IWGP Junior Heavyweight Tag Team Championship back to Apollo 55 (Devitt and Taguchi), while new member Yoshi-Hashi was defeated in five minutes by Kazuchika Okada in both men's NJPW return match. Later that night, Chaos Top Team was defeated by Pro Wrestling Noah representatives Go Shiozaki and Naomichi Marufuji. At the following day's press conference where his upcoming title match was made official, Kazuchika Okada, who had issued a challenge to Hiroshi Tanahashi for the IWGP Heavyweight Championship at the end of Wrestle Kingdom, revealed that he had joined Chaos as well, enlisting new stablemate Gedo as his manager and spokesperson. On February 12 at The New Beginning, No Remorse Corps defeated Apollo 55 to regain the IWGP Junior Heavyweight Tag Team Championship. Later that night, Tanaka lost the IWGP Intercontinental Championship to Hirooki Goto. In the main event, Okada defeated Tanahashi to win the IWGP Heavyweight Championship for the first time. Okada made his first title defense on March 4, defeating Tetsuya Naito in the main event of NJPW's 40th anniversary event. On March 18, Yano and Iizuka attacked Tenzan and Kojima after they had successfully defended their title against Lance Archer and Yoshihiro Takayama and stole their championship belts.

On April 21, Low Ki returned to NJPW, aligning himself with the Chaos and teaming with Gedo, Jado and Rocky Romero in an eight-man tag team match to defeat Jyushin Thunder Liger, Prince Devitt, Ryusuke Taguchi and Tiger Mask, with Ki pinning IWGP Junior Heavyweight Champion Devitt for the win. On May 2, Richards and Romero were stripped of the IWGP Junior Heavyweight Tag Team Championship after a car accident forced Richards to miss his flight to Japan and the following day's Wrestling Dontaku 2012 event, where the two were scheduled to defend the title against Jyushin Thunder Liger and Tiger Mask. On May 3 at Wrestling Dontaku 2012, Low Ki defeated Prince Devitt to win the IWGP Junior Heavyweight Championship while Iizuka and Yano defeated Hiroyoshi Tenzan and Satoshi Kojima to win the IWGP Tag Team Championship, starting Yano's second reign with the title. From May 27 to June 10, Gedo, Jado and Low Ki participated at the 2012 Best of the Super Juniors tournament, where Low Ki defeated Prince Devitt to advance to the finals but lost to Ryusuke Taguchi. Also at the last day of the Best of the Super Juniors, Alex Koslov joined the stable and formed Forever Hooligans with his former AAA partner Rocky Romero.

On June 16 at Dominion 6.16, Brian Kendrick joined the stable by teaming with Gedo and Jado in a six-man tag team match, where they defeated Jyushin Thunder Liger, Kushida and Tiger Mask when Kendrick pinned Kushida. Yano's and Iizuka's first title defense, a rematch against Tenzan and Kojima, ended in a no contest and were stripped of the IWGP Tag Team Championship four days later. In the main event, Okada lost the IWGP Heavyweight Championship back to Tanahashi, ending his reign. On July 22, Yano and Iizuka were defeated by Tenzan and Kojima in a decision match for the vacant title. Koslov and Romero defeated Jyushin Thunder Liger and Tiger Mask to win the IWGP Junior Heavyweight Tag Team Championship. Also at that event, Nakamura defeated Hirooki Goto to win the IWGP Intercontinental Championship for the first time. On July 29, Low Ki lost the title to Kota Ibushi in his second defense.

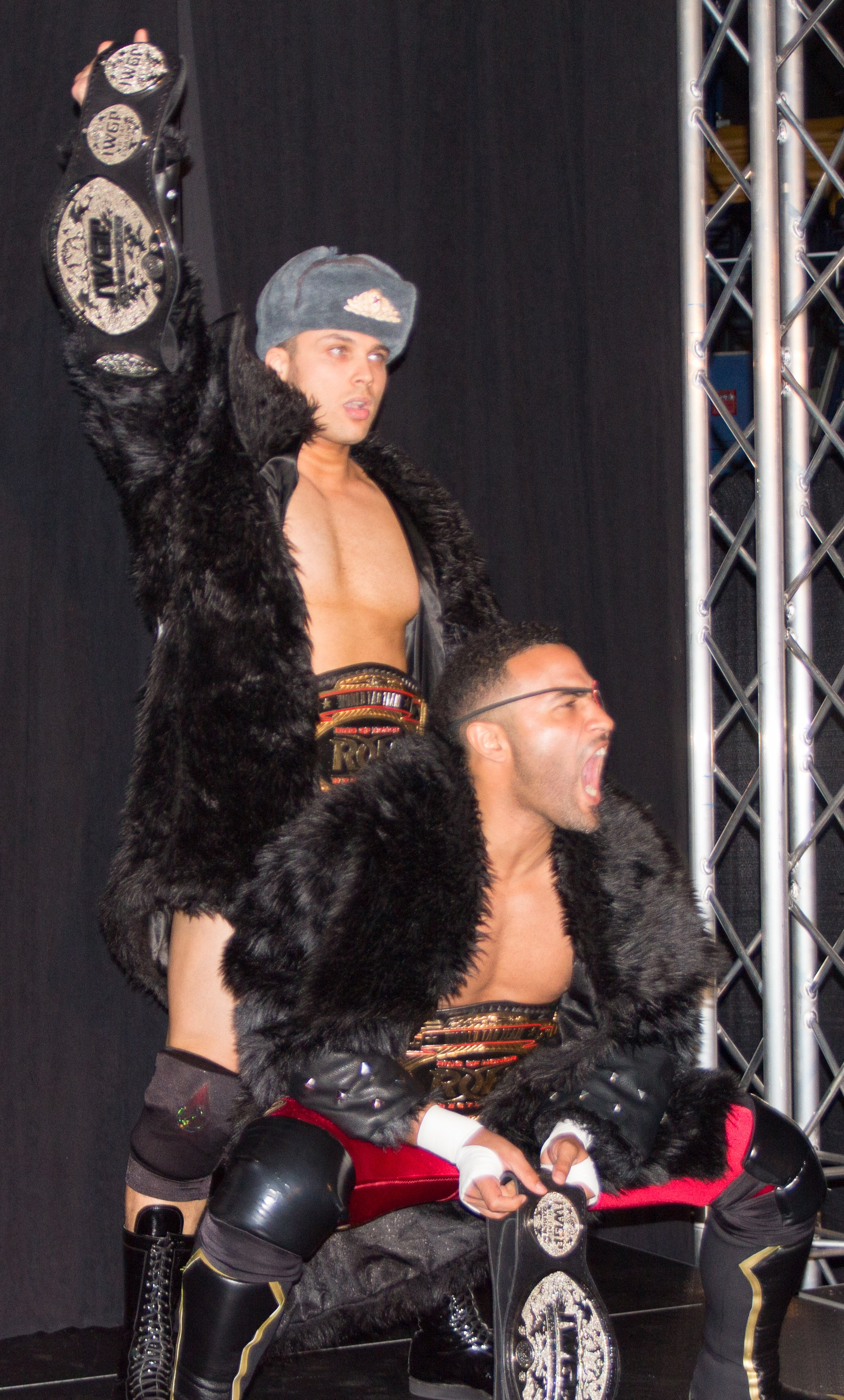
Forever Hooligans, Alex Koslov and Rocky Romero (right), with both the IWGP Junior Heavyweight Tag Team Championship and ROH World Tag Team Championship belts in 2013

From August 1 to August 12, Okada, Nakamura, Yano and Takahashi participated at the 2012 G1 Climax. During the tournament, Okada wrestled in the same block as Chaos leader Shinsuke Nakamura and on August 5 was defeated by Nakamura. At the finals on August 12, Okada defeated Karl Anderson to win the 2012 G1 Climax.

On October 8 at King of Pro-Wrestling, Forever Hooligans made their second successful title defense by defeating Time Splitters (Alex Shelley and Kushida). Later that night, Low Ki regained the IWGP Junior Heavyeight title from Kota Ibushi. Later that night, Nakamura successfully defended the IWGP Intercontinental Championship in a rematch against Hirooki Goto. On November 12 at Power Struggle, Forever Hooligans lost the IWGP Junior Heavyweight Tag Team Championship to the winners of the Super Jr. Tag Tournament, Time Splitters, ending their reign at 112 days. Later that night, Low Ki lost the IWGP Junior Heavyweight Championship to Prince Devitt in his first title defense. Takahashi received his first shot at the IWGP Heavyweight Championship, but was defeated by Hiroshi Tanahashi. From November 15 to November 19, Takahashi, Tanaka. Hashi and Ishii participated in a tournament to crown the first NEVER Openweight Champion, but Takahashi was eliminated at the first round, Hashi was eliminated at second round by Ishii and Ishii was eliminated by Tanaka at the semifinals while Tanaka defeated Karl Anderson at the finals to become the inaugural champion. On December 10, Tokyo Sports named Okada the 2012 MVP in all of puroresu. His match with Tanahashi from June 16 was also named the Match of the Year.

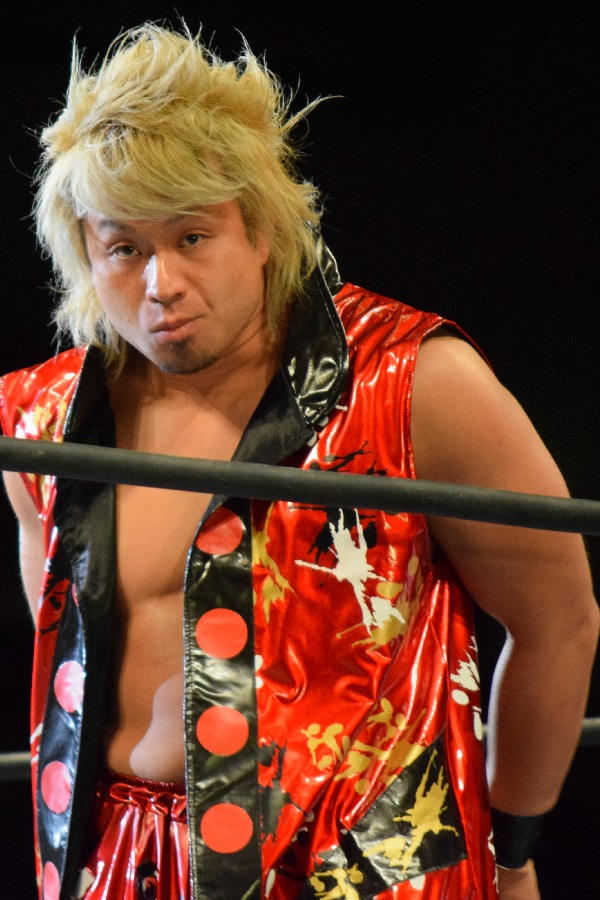
Yoshi-Hashi

On January 4, 2013, at Wrestle Kingdom 7 in Tokyo Dome, Bob Sapp, Yano, Iizuka and Takahshi lost to Akebono, Manabu Nakanishi, MVP and Strong Man. Later that night, Tanaka made his first successful title defense of the NEVER Openweight Champion by defeating Shelton Benjamin. In the main event, Okada failed in his title challenge against Hiroshi Tanahashi. Also on that event, New Japan removed Low Ki's profile from its official website, signaling the end of his run with the promotion. From January 18 to 19, Nakamura took part in the Fantastica Mania 2013 weekend (co-promoted by New Japan and Consejo Mundial de Lucha Libre) and in the main event of the second night he made his fifth successful defense of the IWGP Intercontinental Championship against La Sombra. On February 9, Yano and Iizuka made an appearance for Pro Wrestling Noah, wrestling Maybach Taniguchi and Maybach Taniguchi Jr. to a double disqualification. Later, Yano and Iizuka attacked No Mercy leader Kenta after the main event, which led to Maybach Taniguchi coming out to seemingly save his stablemate, but he ended up hitting Kenta with a chair and Yano then grabbed Naomichi Marufuji's and Takashi Sugiura's GHC Tag Team Championship belts from ringside before handing Taniguchi Kenta's GHC Heavyweight Championship belt. The following day, Yano and Iizuka were named the number one contenders to the GHC Tag Team Championship. Also in February, Okada led Chaos to a war with NJPW's other villainous stable, Suzuki-gun, which built to a match on February 10 at The New Beginning, where Okada, positioned as the fan favorite, was defeated by the stable's leader Minoru Suzuki following interference from Taichi. On March 10, Yano and Iizuka defeated Naomichi Marufuji and Takashi Sugiura to become the new GHC Tag Team Champions.

From March 11 to March 23, Okada, Yano, Nakamura, Ishii and Takahashi participated at the 2013 New Japan Cup, during which Okada defeated Hirooki Goto to win the 2013 New Japan Cup. On April 5, Nakamura and Tomohiro Ishii unsuccessfully challenged Killer Elite Squad (Davey Boy Smith Jr. and Lance Archer) for the IWGP Tag Team Championship. Two days later at Invasion Attack, Okada defeated Tanahashi to win the IWGP Heavyweight Championship for the second time.

On May 3 at Wrestling Dontaku 2013, Koslov and Romero regained the IWGP Junior Heavyweight Tag Team Championship from the Time Splitters. In the main event, Okada made his first successful title defense against Minoru Suzuki. Yano and Iizuka made their first successful defense of the GHC Tag Team Championship on May 12 against TMDK (Mikey Nicholls and Shane Haste). Post-match, Yano named himself the number one contender to the GHC Heavyweight Championship and his status as the next challenger for Kenta's title was made official the following day.

On May 31, Nakamura lost the IWGP Intercontinental Championship to La Sombra in a CMLL event. On June 2 at Pro Wrestling Noah, Yano received a chance for the GHC Heavyweight Championship, he but ended up losing to the defending champion Kenta. This led to a GHC Tag Team Championship match on June 8, where Yano and Iizuka successfully defended their title against Kenta and Yoshihiro Takayama, with Yano pinning Kenta for the win. On June 22 at Dominion 6.22, a special three-way match took place for the IWGP Tag Team Championship held by Tencozy, which also included Yano and Iizuka and K.E.S. (both GHC Tag Team and NWA World Tag Team Champions) and which was won by Tencozy, only for Yano to once again steal their championship belts. On July 20, Nakamura regained the IWGP Intercontinental Championship from La Sombra, becoming the first two-time holder of the title. Also on that night, Yano and Iizuka were defeated by Tencozy in another IWGP Tag Team Championship match.

On September 29 at Destruction, Tanaka lost the NEVER Openweight Championship in a rematch with Naito, ending his reign at 314 days. In the main event, Okada defeated Satoshi Kojima for his fourth successful defense of the IWGP Heavyweight Championship.

On October 14 at King of Pro-Wrestling, Koslov and Romero lost the title to Taichi and Taka Michinoku in a rematch. Later that night, Takahashi unsuccessfully challenged former partner Tetsuya Naito for the NEVER Openweight Championship and the number one contendership to the IWGP Heavyweight Championship. In the main event, Okada made his fifth successful title defense against Hiroshi Tanahashi in what Tanahashi claimed would be his final challenge for the title. With the win, NJPW claimed that Okada had taken over Tanahashi's spot as the "ace" of the promotion. From October 25 to November 6, Gedo and Jado, Forever Hoolingans and Brian Kendrick and new Chaos member Beretta participated at the 2013 Super Jr. Tag Tournament. On November 9 at Power Struggle, Nakamura made his third successful title defense against Minoru Suzuki (had Nakamura lost the title, he would have had to join Suzuki-gun) and nominated Hiroshi Tanahashi as his next challenger, setting up the first title match between the two longtime rivals in over two years.

Following a disappointing fan reaction to a confrontation between Okada and Naito, NJPW announced that fans would get to vote whether they or Shinsuke Nakamura and Hiroshi Tanahashi for the IWGP Intercontinental Championship would be the true main event of the Tokyo Dome show. When the results were released on December 9, Okada and Naito had gotten only half the votes Nakamura and Tanahashi had gotten and as a result lost their main event spot. That same day, Okada became the first wrestler in 25 years to win back-to-back MVP awards from Tokyo Sports.

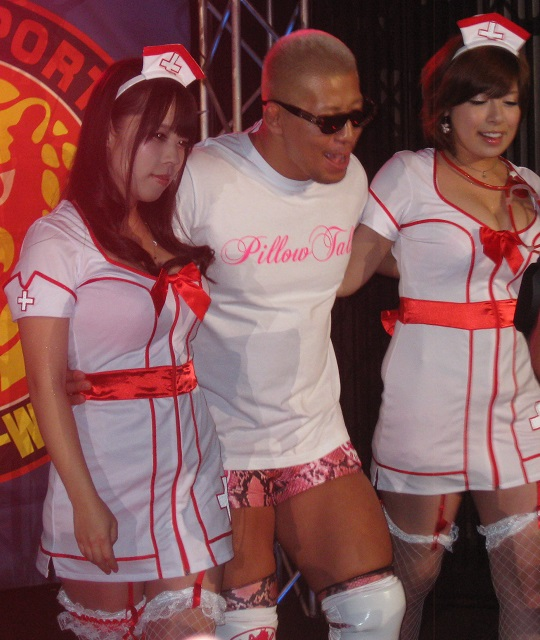
Yujiro Takahashi defected Chaos to become the first Japanese member of Bullet Club in May 2014

On January 4, 2014, at Wrestle Kingdom 8 in Tokyo Dome, Okada defeated Naito for his seventh successful title defense. Later in the main event, Nakamura lost the IWGP Intercontinental Championship to Hiroshi Tanahashi. At The New Beginning in Osaka, Ishii defeated Tetsuya Naito to become the third NEVER Openweight Champion, winning his first title in NJPW.

From March 15 to March 23, Nakamura, Ishii and Takahashi participated in the 2014 New Japan Cup, during which Ishii and Takahashi ended up being eliminated at the first round while Nakamura went on defeating Bad Luck Fale in the finals on March 23 and afterwards challenged Tanahashi to another rematch for the IWGP Intercontinental Championship. On April 6 at Invasion Attack 2014, Ishii defeated Tetsuya Naito to make his first successful title defense. Later in the main event, Nakamura defeated Tanahashi to win the IWGP Intercontinental Championship for the third time. Also that night, Okada found himself a new challenger in Bullet Club's newest member, the debuting A.J. Styles, who claimed that Okada was still the same "young boy" (rookie) he had known in TNA. Ishii's second successful defense of the NEVER Openweight Championship took place just six days later during NJPW's trip to Taiwan, when he defeated Kushida. On May 3 at Wrestling Dontaku 2014, Ishii made his third successful title defense against Tomoaki Honma and was afterwards challenged by IWGP Junior Heavyweight Champion Kota Ibushi, with whom he had had sporadic heated encounters since the past year's G1 Climax. In the main event, Okada thirteen-month reign as the IWGP Heavyweight Champion came to an end, when he lost the title to Styles in his ninth defense after Yujiro Takahashi turned on him and Chaos and joined Bullet Club. In May, Okada took part in NJPW's North American tour, during which he received a rematch for the IWGP Heavyweight Championship. On May 17 at War of the Worlds in New York City, Okada unsuccessfully challenged Styles for the title in a three-way match which also included Michael Elgin, whom Styles pinned for the win.

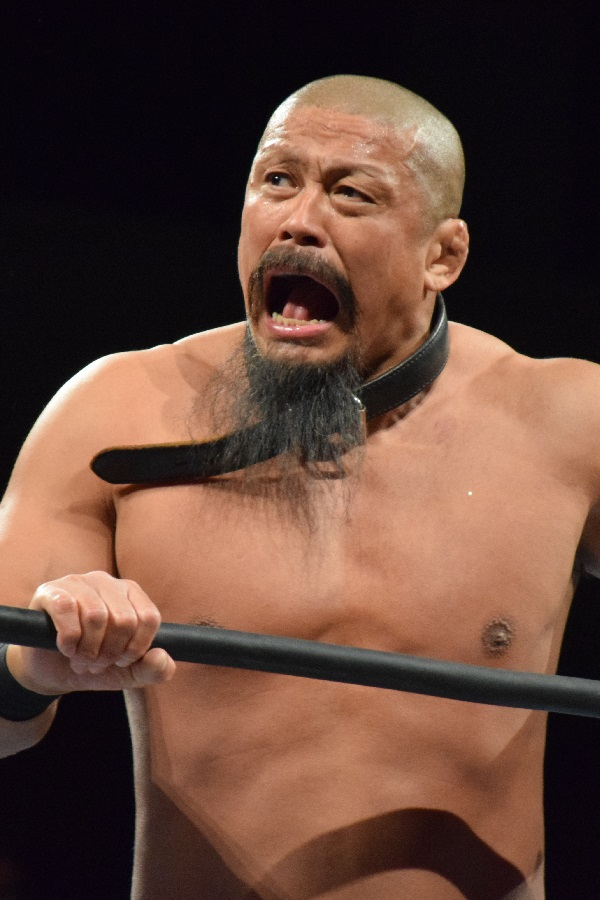
Takashi Iizuka, who turned on the stable in May 2014

On May 25 at the Back to the Yokohama Arena, Ishii made his fourth successful title defense against Kota Ibushi, but Ishii was pulled into the rivalry between Chaos and Bullet Club, when he was attacked after the match by former stablemate Yujiro Takahashi, who appointed himself as his next challenger. Later that night, Nakamura made the first successful defense of his third reign as the IWGP Intercontinental Champion against Daniel Gracie. In the main event, Okada unsuccessfully challenged A.J Styles for the IWGP Heavyweight Championship. Also at that event, Yano and Iizuka faced off against Minoru Suzuki and Shelton X Benjamin in a tag team match, during which Iizuka turned on Yano and Chaos, helping Suzuki pin him for the win and joining Suzuki-gun. From May 30 to June 8, Koslov and Romero took part in the 2014 Best of the Super Juniors, but after Koslov's first match against Ricochet he dislocate his left shoulder and was forced to pull out of the tournament. Romero ended up finishing the tournament with 6 points being at last on his block while Kazushi Sakuraba joined the stable and formed a partnership with Yano. On June 29, Ishii lost the NEVER Openweight Championship to Takahashi in his fifth defense, following outside interference from Bullet Club. On June 21 at Dominion 6.21, Nakamura lost the title to Bad Luck Fale in his second defense.

From July 21 to August 10, Okada, Nakamura, Ishii and Yano participated at the 2014 G1 Climax, during which Ishii finished tied fifth in his block with a record of five wins and five losses, working his two final matches with a separated shoulder, while Yano finished with a record of four wins and six losses ( which included a win over Suzuki) and Okada and Nakamura won their block both with 16 points, with both advancing to the finals won by Okada. On September 21 at Destruction in Kobe, Yoshi-Hashi and Okada unsuccessfully challenged Doc Gallows and Karl Anderson for the IWGP Tag Team Championship. In the main event, Nakamura regained the IWGP Intercontinental Championship from Bad Luck Fale. Two days later at Destruction in Okayama, Yoshi-Hashi also failed to capture the NEVER Openweight Championship from Yujiro Takahashi. In the main event, Okada successfully defended his IWGP Heavyweight Championship number one contender's contract against Karl Anderson. On October 13 at King of Pro-Wrestling, Ishii regained the NEVER Openweight Championship from Yujiro Takahashi, becoming the first two-time holder of the title. Later that night, Okada made another successful defense of his contract against Tetsuya Naito. On November 8 at Power Struggle, Ishii made his first successful title defense of the NEVER Openweight Champion against Hirooki Goto. Later in the main event, Nakamura made his first successful title defense of the IWGP Intercontinental Champion against Katsuyori Shibata. From November 22 to December 7, Chaos participated in the World Tag League, having three teams to participate in the tournament, with Okada and Hashi in the block A and Nakamura and Ishii and Sakuraba and Yano in the block B. In the block A, Okada and Hashi finished their block with a record of four wins and three losses, failing to advance to the finals. In the block B, the team of Nakamura and Ishii finished second in their block with a record of four wins and three losses, narrowly missing the finals of the tournament due to losing to Hirooki Goto and Katsuyori Shibata on the final day, while the team of Sakuraba and Yano finished in the middle of their block with a record of three wins, one draw and three losses.

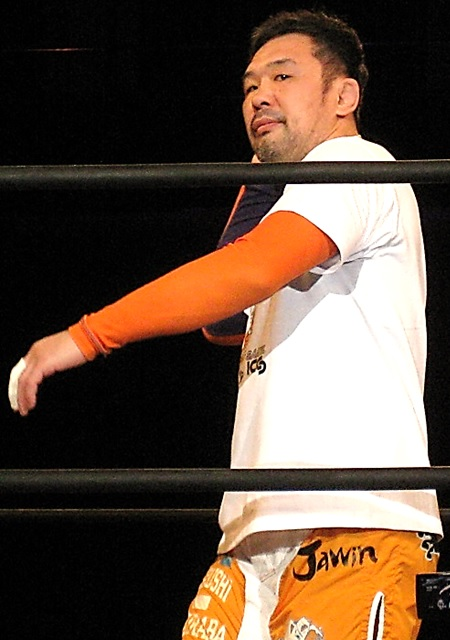
Kazushi Sakuraba

On January 4, 2015, at Wrestle Kingdom 9, Tomohiro Ishii lost the Never Openweight Championship to Togi Makabe in his second defense, Nakamura defeated Kota Ibushi in his second successful defense of the IWGP Intercontinental Championship and Okada lost to Hiroshi Tanahashi in the main event of Wrestle Kingdom, failing to capture the IWGP Heavyweight Championship. On February 14 at The New Beginning in Sendai, Ishii defeated Tomoaki Honma, a late replacement for an ill Togi Makabe, to win the now vacant NEVER Openweight Championship for the third time, and Nakamura defeated Yuji Nagata, making his third successful title defense. In January 2015, Forever Hooligans broke up when Koslov announced he was taking an indefinite break from professional wrestling, leaving the stable. On March 1, Romero revealed he and Trent Baretta were forming a new tag team named Roppongi Vice. Through March 5 and 15, Toru Yano, Kazuchika Okada and Yoshi-Hashi took part of the 2015 New Japan Cup. Toru Yano defeated Hiroshi Tanahashi in the opening round, but lost in the second round to the eventual winner Kota Ibushi while Okada and Yoshi-Hashi also lost in the opening round, with Okada being defeated by Bad Luck Fale and Yoshi-Hashi being defeated by Yujiro Takahashi. At Invasion Attack 2015 on April 5, Roppongi Vice defeated The Young Bucks for the IWGP Junior Heavyweight Tag Team Championship. At Wrestling Dontaku 2015 on May 3, Roppongi Vice lost the IWGP Junior Heavyweight Tag Team Championship to The Young Bucks in a match also involving ReDRagon Bobby Fish and Kyle O'Reilly, while Shinsuke Nakamura lost the IWGP Intercontinental Championship to Hirooki Goto in the main event. On April 29 at Wrestling Hinokuni, Tomohiro Ishii lost the Never Openweight Championship to Togi Makabe for a second time. On July 5 at Dominion 7.5 in Osaka-jo Hall, Roppongi Vice failed to recapture the championship in a three-way match that also included reDRagon, while Nakamura also failed to recapture the IWGP Intercontinental Championship from Hirooki Goto and Okada defeated AJ Styles to win the IWGP Heavyweight Championship in the main event, making his third reign.

From July 20 and August 16, Chaos participated in the G1 Climax 2015 with Toru Yano in the block A and Shinsuke Nakamura, Kazuchika Okada and Tomohiro Ishii in the block B. Yano finished in the middle of his block with a record of four wins and five losses, Okada finished in the second of his block with a record of seven wins and two losses, losing to stablemate Shinsuke Nakamura costing him a spot in the finals. Despite missing one match due to an elbow injury, Nakamura won his block and advanced to the finals by defeating reigning IWGP Heavyweight Champion and Chaos stablemate Kazuchika Okada in his last round-robin match, giving him a record of seven wins and two losses. On August 16, Nakamura was defeated in the finals of the tournament by Hiroshi Tanahashi. and Ishii finished in the middle of his block with a record of five wins and four losses. Also on August 16, Okada had a staredown with Genichiro Tenryu, who chose him to be his opponent in his retirement match. On September 27 at Destruction in Kobe, immediately after reDRagon defended their titles, Roppongi would viciously assault them in order to attain a championship match, and Nakamura defeated Hirooki Goto to win the IWGP Intercontinental Championship for the fifth time. On October 12 at King of Pro-Wrestling, Roppongi Vice failed again to capture the IWGP Junior Heavyweight Tag Team Championship, losing to ReDragon Bobby Fish and Kyle O'Reilly, Ishii defeated Makabe to win the NEVER Openweight Championship for the fourth time and Okada defeated A.J. Styles, making his first title defense. During the 2015 Super Jr. Tag Tournament, Vice achieved big wins over the likes of Jyushin Thunder Liger and Tiger Mask as well as the reigning champions; reDRagon. On November 7 at Power Struggle Roppongi Vice, were defeated in the finals of the tournament by Matt Sydal and Ricochet, but along with The Young Bucks, still challenged for the title after the match, Ishii defeated Tomoaki Honma making his first successful title defense and Shinsuke Nakamura defeated Karl Anderson making his first successful title defense and avenging an earlier loss from the 2015 G1 Climax. On November 15, Okada defeated Tenryu in his retirement match. On December 7, Okada won his third MVP award from Tokyo Sports, while his match with Tenryu was named the Match of the Year. With the win, Okada became only the fifth three-time MVP award winner. On December 19, The Briscoes joined the stable.

=== Under Kazuchika Okada (2016–2025) ===
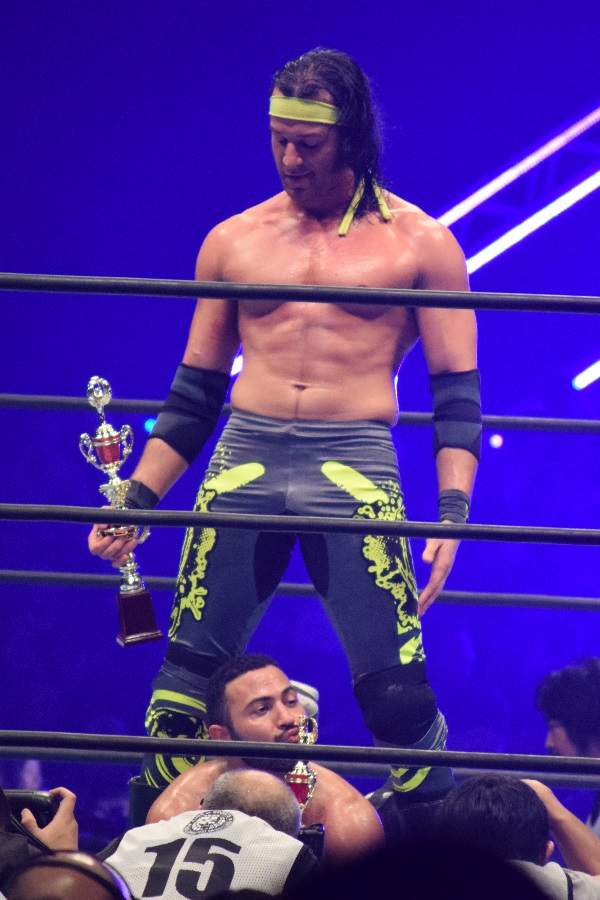
Roppongi Vice after winning the 2016 Super Jr. Tag Tournament

On January 4 at Wrestle Kingdom 10 in Tokyo Dome, Roppongi Vice failed for the third time to capture the IWGP Junior Heavyweight Tag Team Championships, Toru Yano teamed with the Ring of Honor (ROH) tag team of Jay Briscoe and Mark Briscoe to defeat Bullet Club's Bad Luck Fale, Tama Tonga and Yujiro Takahashi to become the inaugural NEVER Openweight 6-Man Tag Team Champions, while Ishii was defeated by Katsuyori Shibata ending his fourth reign of the Never Openweight Championship, Nakamura made his second successful defense by defeating A.J. Styles and Okada defeated 2015 G1 Climax winner Hiroshi Tanahashi in the main event of Wrestle Kingdom 10 in Tokyo Dome to retain the IWGP Heavyweight Championship. Hours after the event it was reported that Nakamura had given his notice to NJPW on the morning of January 4, announcing that he was leaving the promotion for WWE. Nakamura remained under NJPW contract and was expected to finish off his contracted dates with the promotion before leaving. On January 12, NJPW confirmed Nakamura's upcoming departure and announced he would also be stripped of the IWGP Intercontinental Championship. Nakamura handed in the title on January 25, officially ending his fifth reign. Nakamura wrestled his last match under his NJPW contract on January 30, where he, Okada and Ishii defeated Hirooki Goto, Hiroshi Tanahashi and Katsuyori Shibata.

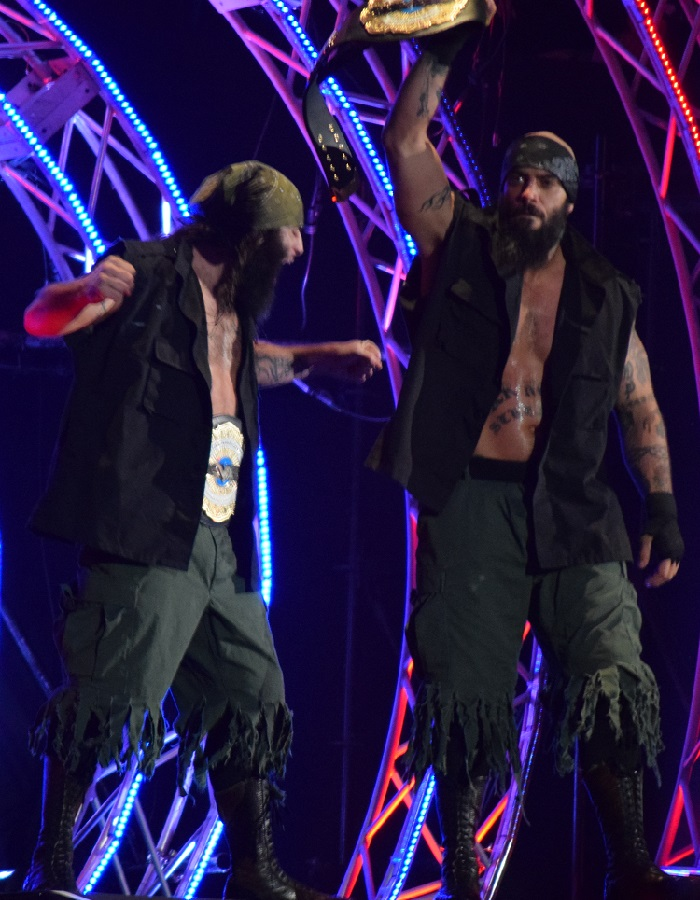
The Briscoe Brothers

Toru Yano and his new allies The Briscoe Brothers (Jay Briscoe and Mark Briscoe) made their first successful title defense the following day against another Bullet Club trio of Bad Luck Fale, Matt Jackson and Nick Jackson. On February 11 at The New Beginning in Osaka, Yano and The Briscoes lost the NEVER Openweight 6-Man Tag Team Championship to the Bullet Club trio of Bad Luck Fale, Tama Tonga and Yujiro Takahashi, Tomohiro Ishii failed to capture the NEVER Openweight Championship when he was defeated by Katsuyori Shibata and Kazuchika Okada defeated Hirooki Goto in the main event to make his third successful title defense and invited Goto to join the stable, but he refused. Yano and the Briscoes regained the title three days later at The New Beginning in Niigata. Over the next several events, Okada tried to shake hands with Goto and get him to join Chaos on multiple occasions, but he was turned down each time. On February 19 at the NJPW and Ring of Honor (ROH) co-produced Honor Rising: Japan 2016, Yano and the Briscoes lost the title to Kenny Omega, Matt Jackson and Nick Jackson, and Ishii defeating Roderick Strong for the ROH World Television Championship in the main event. Ishii made his debut for ROH the following week at their 14th Anniversary Show, successfully defending his title in a three-way match against Strong and Bobby Fish. At the following day's Ring of Honor Wrestling tapings, Ishii successfully defended the title against Cedric Alexander to return to Japan as the reigning champion.

==== Feud with Los Ingobernables de Japón ====
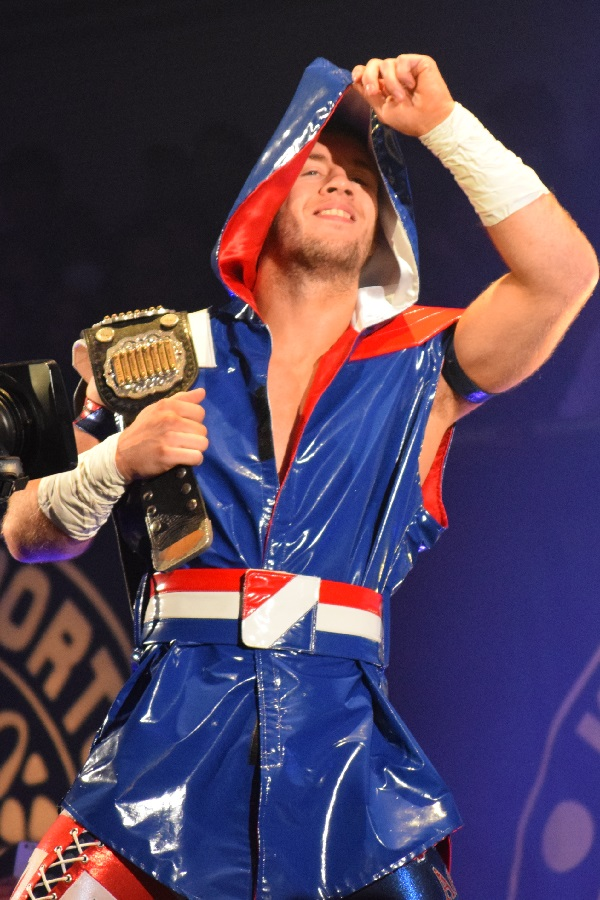
Will Ospreay

In early 2016, Chaos entered a rivalry with the Los Ingobernables de Japón (L.I.J.) stable. On March 3 it was announced that Will Ospreay had joined Chaos. After the final match in the New Japan Cup, Hirooki Goto finally agreed to shake hands with Okada, after he saved him from a post-match assault by Naito and his L.I.J. stable, and joined Chaos. On 10 April at Invasion Attack, Goto and Tomohiro Ishii defeated Los Ingobernables de Japón (Bushi and Evil), and Roppongi Vice Beretta and Rocky Romero defeated Matt Sydal and Ricochet to win the IWGP Junior Heavyweight Tag Team Championship for the second time. In the main event Okada lost the IWGP Heavyweight Championship to 2016 New Japan Cup winner Tetsuya Naito, following outside interference from Naito's Los Ingobernables de Japón stablemates Bushi, Evil and the debuting Sanada. On May 3, at Wrestling Dontaku Roppongi Vice lost the titles back to Matt Sydal and Ricochet, Okada gained revenge on Sanada by defeating him and failed to capture the IWGP Heavyweight Championship in the main event by losing to Tetsuya Naito. Five days later, Ishii lost the ROH World Television Championship to Bobby Fish at the NJPW and ROH co-produced Global Wars show.

From April 21 to May 4, Yano took part in Pro Wrestling Noah's 2016 Global Tag League, where he teamed with Naomichi Marufuji. The two defeated the reigning GHC Tag Team Champions, Davey Boy Smith Jr. and Lance Archer, to win the tournament. From May 21 and June 7 Chaos participated in the Best of the Super Juniors (XXIII – twenty-third), and Ospreay defeated Ryusuke Taguchi in the finals to win the tournament. On May 28, Gedo and Jado made a surprise appearance for Pro Wrestling Noah, challenging Atsushi Kotoge and Daisuke Harada to a match for the GHC Junior Heavyweight Tag Team Championship, and Toru Yano and Marufuji defeated Smith and Archer in a rematch to become the new GHC Tag Team Champions. On June 19, Okada won the IWGP Heavyweight Championship for the fourth time, ending the feud with Los Ingobernables de Japón.

==== Championship dominance ====
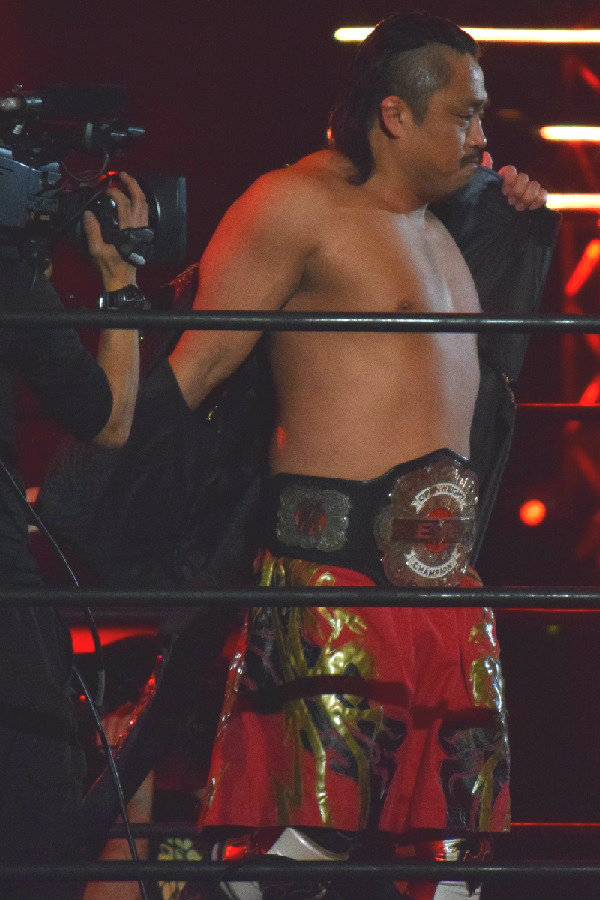
Hirooki Goto

During the G1 Climax, Okada was defeated by Pro Wrestling Noah representative Naomichi Marufuji, starting a feud between NJPW and Pro Wrestling Noah, while Ishii finished with a record of four wins and five losses. One of Ishii's wins was over Chaos stablemate and reigning IWGP Heavyweight Champion Kazuchika Okada. Yoshi-Hashi finished the tournament last in his block with a record of three wins and six losses. Despite this, Yoshi-Hashi's opening match win resulted in Kenny Omega nominating him as his first challenger for the Tokyo Dome IWGP Heavyweight Championship match contract after winning the entire tournament.

On October 8, Gedo and Jado defeated Kotoge and Harada to win the GHC Junior Heavyweight Tag Team Championship. On October 10, at the King of Pro-Wrestling Hirooki Goto was defeated by Kenny Omega failing to win the IWGP Heavyweight Championship challenge right certificate, The Briscoes lost the titles back to Tonga and Loa, and Okada retained the IWGP Heavyweight Championship against Marufuji, thus setting up the main event of Wrestle Kingdom 11 in Tokyo Dome between Okada and Kenny Omega. From October 21 to November 5, Chaos participated in the 2016 Super Jr. Tag Tournament with Roppongi Vice, and Gedo and Will Ospreay representing the stable. On November 5, at Power Struggle Ishii and Yano failed to win the IWGP Tag Team Championship when they were defeated by Guerrillas of Destiny, and Roppongi Vice defeated A. C. H. and Taiji Ishimori in the finals of the Super Jr. Tag Tournament. On November 23, Yano and Marufuji lost the GHC Tag Team Championship back to Davey Boy Smith Jr. and Lance Archer.

On December 14, Okada became the second wrestler to win three consecutive Match of the Year awards from Tokyo Sports for his 2016 G1 Climax opener against Naomichi Marufuji. On December 24, Jado and Gedo lost the GHC Junior Heavyweight Tag Team Championships back to Atsushi Kotoge and Daisuke Harada. On January 4, 2017, at the Wrestle Kingdom 11 in Tokyo Dome, Roppongi Vice defeated The Young Bucks to regain the IWGP Junior Heavyweight Tag Team Championships for their third time, Hirooki Goto defeated Katsuyori Shibata to win the NEVER Openweight Championship, and Kazuchika Okada successfully defended the IWGP Heavyweight Championship against Kenny Omega. At 46 minutes and 45 seconds, the match was the longest in the history of the January 4 Tokyo Dome Show. Wrestling journalist Dave Meltzer, in his Wrestling Observer Newsletter, gave the match a six-star rating. He added that Okada and Omega "may have put on the greatest match in pro wrestling history" and that it was the best match he had ever seen.

==== Feud with Suzuki-gun, Bullet Club, and Los Ingobernables de Japón ====
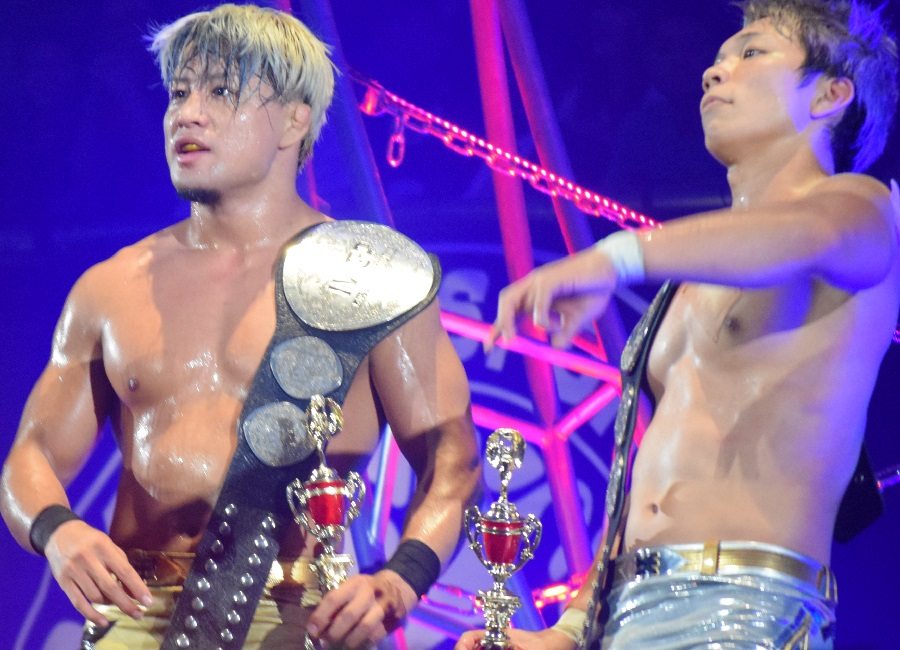
Roppongi 3K as the IWGP Junior Heavyweight Tag Team Champions and the winners of the 2017 Super Jr. Tag Tournament

The next day, Suzuki-gun made its return to NJPW after two years away with all eight members attacking the ring following a ten-man tag team match between Chaos and NJPW's main army. The angle led to multiple title matches the following month. On February 5 at The New Beginning in Sapporo Chaos retained all of their championships, with Roppongi Vice (Beretta and Rocky Romero) defeating Taka Michinoku and Taichi to retain their IWGP Junior Heavyweight Tag Team Championships, Tomohiro Ishii and Toru Yano defeated K.E.S. in a three-way match, also involving G.B.H. (Togi Makabe and Tomoaki Honma) to retain their IWGP Tag Team Championships, and in the main event Okada defeated Minoru Suzuki to retain his IWGP Heavyweight Championship. In March Roppongi Vice lost the IWGP Junior Heavyweight Tag Team Championship to Suzuki-gun (Taichi and Yoshinobu Kanemaru), and Ishii and Yano lost the IWGP Tag Team Championship to Satoshi Kojima and Hiroyoshi Tenzan. On March 11, The Briscoes and Bully Ray defeated The Kingdom to win the ROH World Six-Man Tag Team Championship. On April 27 Romero and Berreta regained the IWGP Junior Tag Team Championship. In the main event Goto lost the NEVER Openweight Champion to Minoru Suzuki, after the interference from Suzuki's Suzuki-gun stablemate El Despereado. On June 11 at Dominion 6.11 in Osaka-jo Hall Roppongi Vice lost the IWGP Junior Heavyweight Tag Team Championship to The Young Bucks. In the main event of the show, Okada and Kenny Omega wrestled to a 60-minute time limit draw for the IWGP Heavyweight Championship.

On July 2 at first night of the G1 Special in USA, Roppongi Vice's Romero gave Beretta his blessing to move to the heavyweight division. On September 16, 2017, at NJPW's Destruction in Hiroshima show, the Roppongi Vice had their final match together before amicably splitting up. Later that same show, Romero confronted IWGP Junior Heavyweight Tag Team Champions Ricochet and Ryusuke Taguchi, telling them about his new team "Roppongi 3K". This name came from Romero's claim that Roppongi 3K were 3000 times better than Roppongi Vice. Afterwards, while Roppongi 3K were confirmed as the next challengers for Ricochet and Taguchi, the identities of the two wrestlers were kept secret. On October 9 at King of Pro-Wrestling, Roppongi 3K were revealed as the returning Sho Tanaka and Yohei Komatsu, billed as "Sho" and "Yoh", who defeated Ricochet and Taguchi to become the new IWGP Junior Heavyweight Tag Team Champions. At the same event Ospreay defeated KUSHIDA to become IWGP Junior Heavyweight Champion, Ishii lost to Tetsuya Naito in a match for the 2018 Tokyo Dome IWGP Heavyweight Championship challenge rights certificate, and Okada successfully defended the IWGP Heavyweight Championship against EVIL in the main event. On November 5, Sho and Yoh won the 2017 Super Jr. Tag Tournament by defeating Super 69 (A. C. H. and Ryusuke Taguchi), and Ospreay lost his title to Marty Scurll. At Wrestle Kingdom 12 Sho and Yoh lost the IWGP Jr Tag titles to the Young Bucks, Yano, Ishii and Beretta won the Never Openweight 6-Man Tag Titles in a 4 team gauntlet match after defeating Bullet Club, and Goto defeated Suzuki to regain the NEVER Openweight Championship. At the event, Ospreay regained the IWGP Jr Heavyweight Title after pinning Scurll in a Fatal 4 Way match also involving Kushida and Hiromu Takahashi. In the main event Okada defeated Tesuya Naito to retain the IWGP World Heavyweight Championship. At the New Year's Dash event, Yano, Ishii and Beretta lost the NEVER Openweight 6-Man Tag Team Championship to Bad Luck Fale and the GoD.

On January 5, Jay White teased joining the Bullet Club, only to attack Omega afterwards. The following day, White joined Chaos. White defeated Kenny Omega to become the second IWGP United States Heavyweight Champion. At Dominion 6.9 in Osaka-jo Hall, Ospreay lost the IWGP Junior Heavyweight Championship back to Himoru Takahashi, and Okada lost the IWGP World Heavyweight Championship to Omega in a 2 out of 3 falls no time limit match, ending Okada's title reign at 720 days. At the end of the G1 Climax tournament, Okada decided to part ways with his longtime manager and mentor Gedo.

==== Departure of Jay White and Gedo ====
At the Destruction event, the team of Tanahashi and Great Bash Heel (Togi Makabe and Tomoaki Honma) defeated the team of Jay White, Okada and Yoshi-Hashi. Also on Night 1, Omega successfully retained his IWGP World Heavyweight Championship Against Ishii. On Night 2 of Destruction, the Chaos group suffered another loss, this time in an eight-man tag team match against Tanahshi, Great Bash Heel and Juice Robinson. On Night 3, Tanahashi defeated Okada in the main event and kept his right for a contract match at Wrestle Kingdom 13 for the IWGP World Heavyweight Championship. After the match, Jay White attacked both Tanahashi and Okada, as well as Rocky Romero when he refused to give White a chair and Yoshi-Hashi when he tried to intervene. Gedo then attacked Okada with a chair and declared on the mic that White was the true winner of the G1 tournament and the G1 briefcase.

On October 2, Will Ospreay tweeted about the current members of the faction, not mentioning the names of White and Gedo. On October 8, at King of Pro-Wrestling, Jado, along with White, Gedo and members of Bullet Club OG, attacked Okada, leaving Chaos. During the Road to Power Struggle tour, White teased in backstage interviews that there is still another member in Chaos being used as a spy for the Bullet Club.

At Road to Power Struggle, after Chaos lost to Bullet Club, Hiroshi Tanahashi came out to make the save for Kazuchika Okada and the two shook hands forming a union between the two. At Power Struggle, Hirooki Goto regained the NEVER Openweight Title from Taichi and for the second year in a row Roppongi 3K won the Super Jr. Tag League. In the finals of the World Tag League, Ospreay won a #1 Contender's Match for the NEVER Title, and in the following match Goto lost the NEVER Title to Kota Ibushi. On the Wrestle Kingdom 13 pre-show, Yano joined Taguchi Japan as a part-time member and won a 5-Team gauntlet #1 Contender's match for the NEVER Openweight 6-Man Tag Titles with Togi Makabe and Ryusuke Taguchi. On the main card Ospreay won the NEVER Openweight Title, Roppongi 3K lost their IWGP Jr. Tag Title match to Shingo Takagi and Bushi, Ishii lost the RevPro British Heavyweight Title to Zack Sabre Jr., and Okada lost to Jay White. At New Year Dash, Okada, Yoshi-Hashi and Tanahashi lost to the Bullet Club, after the match Tanahashi was attacked by White only to be saved by Okada. At The New Beginning in Sapporo, Okada and Tanahashi teamed up to take on Bullet Club's White and Bad Luck Fale in a losing effort. Some of the Chaos members took part in the New Japan Cup, Goto was eliminated in the first round, Mikey Nicholls and Yano Toru lost in second round, Yoshi-Hashi and Will Ospreay lost to fellow Chaos stalemates Ishii and Okada in the quarterfinals, and Okada defeated Ishii in the semifinals. Okada would win the tournament by defeated Sanada in the finals, earning him an IWGP Heavyweight Championship match at G1 Supercard. At G1 Supercard, Okada defeated Jay White to become a five-time IWGP Heavyweight Champion. Also at the event Ospreay lost the NEVER Openweight Championship to Jeff Cobb in a Winner takes all match for both the NEVER Openweight and ROH World Television Championships and Sho, Yoh, Romero, Yoshi-Hashi, Ishii, Yano and Goto took part in the Honor Rumble. At Wrestling Hinokuni, Goto lost to White in the main event.

In June 2019, Ospreay won his second Best of the Super Jr. tournament by defeating Shingo Takagi in the finals, Ospreay would later win the IWGP Junior Heavyweight Championship for the third time at Dominion. At Southern Showdown, Bullet Club member Robbie Eagles turned on his stablemates and joined Chaos and since then he's been teaming with Ospreay as Birds of Prey in tag team competition. At Power Struggle, Roppongi 3K would win the Super Junior Tag Tournament for the third year in a row to earn a IWGP Junior Heavyweight Tag Team title match and Goto would lose a IWGP Intercontinental title match against champion Jay White. On the first night of Wrestle Kingdom 14, Okada would defeat Kota Ibushi to retain the IWGP Heavyweight Championship in the main event meanwhile Ospreay lost the IWGP Junior Heavyweight title to Hiromu Takahashi. On the second night of Wrestle Kingdom 14, Roppongi 3K would win the IWGP Junior Heavyweight Tag Team titles from Bullet Club, Goto won the NEVER Openweight title for a fifth time (tying with Ishii for most reigns) meanwhile Ishii, Yoshi-Hashi and Eagles would lose the NEVER Openweight 6-Man Tag Team Championship Gauntlet match on the pre-show and Okada lost the IWGP Heavyweight title to Tetsuya Naito in the main event. On August 9, 2020, Yoshi-Hashi, along with his fellow stablemates, Tomohiro Ishii and Hirooki Goto, won the NEVER Openweight 6-Man Tag Team Championship in a tournament final at Summer Struggle in Korakuen Hall by defeating fellow stablemates Kazuchika Okada, Toru Yano and Sho.

==== Betrayal of Will Ospreay ====
Throughout G1 Climax 30, Will Ospreay was incredibly confident in his backstage comments, at times bordering on arrogance. On the final night of A block matches Ospreay, with a record of 5–3, faced Okada, with a record of 6–2; an Ospreay win would eliminate Okada from the tournament. During the match, Ospreay's girlfriend Bea Priestley appeared and distracted the referee. This allowed Tomoyuki Oka, returning from excursion and now known as Great-O-Kharn, to enter the ring and slam Okada. Ospreay, at first pretending to not know what happened, hit Okada with the Stormbreaker and got the pin. After the match, Ospreay hit Okada with the Hidden Blade and berated him for "holding [him] back." Backstage, Ospreay declared that he was leaving Chaos and would start a new faction with Oka, who renamed himself Great-O-Khan, and Priestley. He later announced on Instagram that the faction would be called The Empire.

==== Departure of Sho ====
In August 2020, Yoh would pick up an injury which would force himself and Sho to relinquish their tag team titles. Sho would compete as a singles performer until Yoh's return in 2021. After both failing to capture the junior heavyweight titles, the pair began competing as a team again, however ended up taking numerous losses in multi man tag matches. In late July, Yoh, began to undergo a large losing streak, taking the pins in three straight matches prior to Super Jr. Tag League beginning. Roppongi 3K entered the tournament, but lost their first three straight matches, immediately being eliminated from the tournament they had never failed to win in any year prior, with Yoh once again taking the falls each time out. On August 16, Roppongi 3K would lose their fourth tournament match to El Desperado and Kanemaru, after Sho chose to not help Yoh escape a submission hold from Desperado. After the match Sho would attack Yoh and claim that he was now useless to him, disbanding their team after nine years, and turning heel for the first time in his New Japan career. Sho would however remain in CHAOS until September 4, 2021, when he defeated his former tag team partner Yoh by referee stoppage at night 1 of Wrestle Grand Slam in MetLife Dome. After the match, Sho joined Bullet Club, by accepting the shirt given to him by Evil, and officially departing CHAOS.

In October 2021, Okada would win the G1 climax for the third time in his career, finishing top of his block with 16 points (a joint record for 10-man G1 blocks) and defeating Kota Ibushi in the tournament finals.

==== Expansion into AEW and dissolution ====
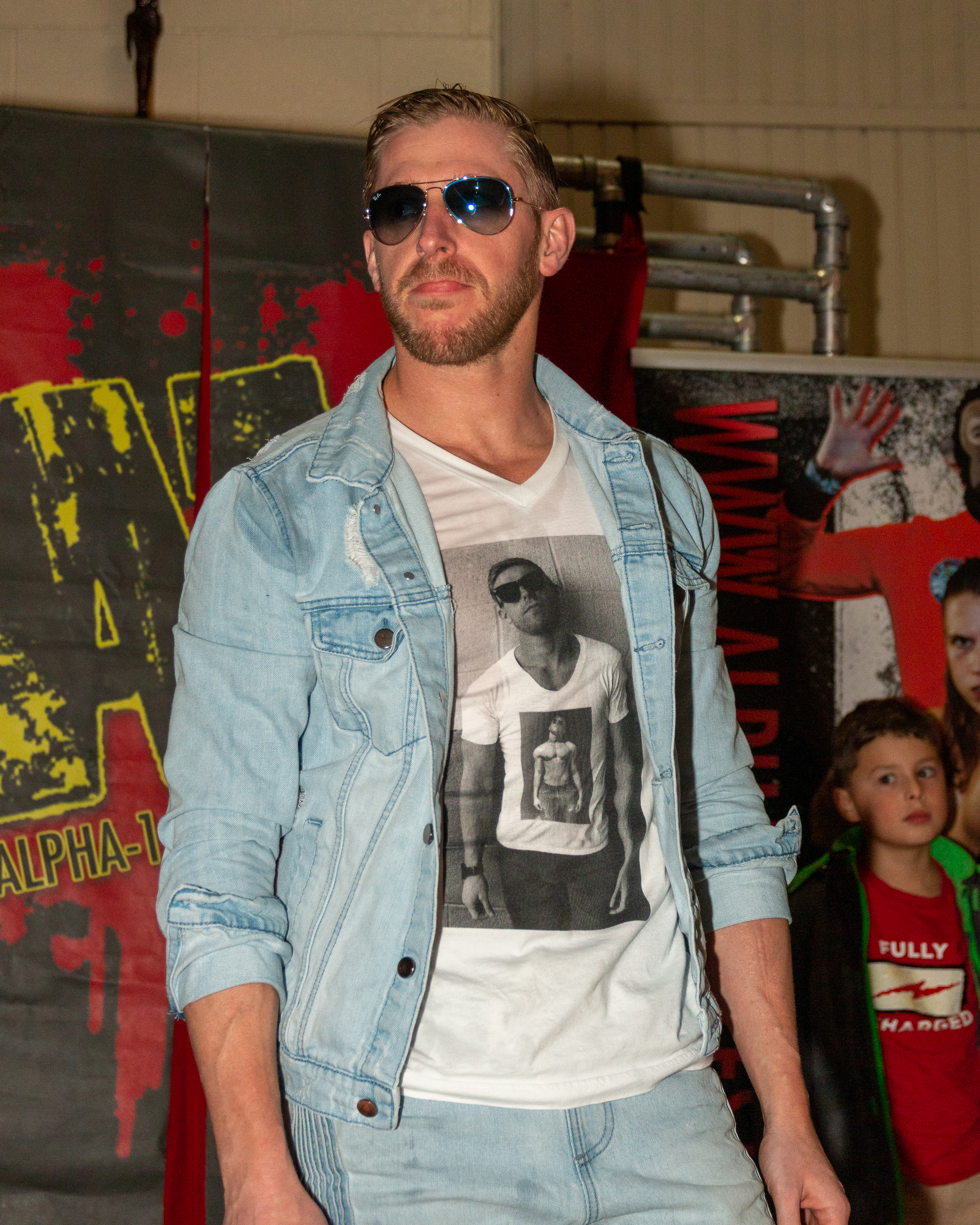
Orange Cassidy, who was part of a U.S.-based branch of CHAOS established in All Elite Wrestling (AEW)

In November 2021, Chuck Taylor and Trent?, now part of All Elite Wrestling (AEW), would rejoin CHAOS along with the other members of Best Friends (Orange Cassidy, Kris Statlander and Wheeler Yuta) after being invited by Rocky Romero, thus establishing a U.S. based branch of the stable in AEW. Romero later confirmed that this invitation was also extended to Trent?'s mom Sue, who appears in several Best Friend features on AEW, making her a member of CHAOS as well.

In the Best of Super Juniors 28, Yoh would lose his opening four matches, including a 3:55 defeat to defending champion Hiromu Takahashi, leaving him on the edge of elimination early on. However, Yoh would turn things around and win his seven remaining block matches, concluding with an emotional victory over his former tag team partner Sho on the final night of blocks to finish second, and qualify for the final. In the tournament final, a rematch against Hiromu Takahashi, the pair wrestled in a record breaking 38:30 contest, with Yoh losing out after a Time Bomb 2. During the match, a bitter Sho interfered and attacked both Yoh and Hiromu, attempting to cause a no contest.

In the 2021 World Tag League, Hiroko Goto and Yoshi Hashi finished top of the single block league with 18 points. In the tournament finals, they defeated House of Torture (with help from Tomohiro Ishii after Dick Togo interfered) to win the World Tag League tournament. This represented Goto's third time winning the World Tag League and eleventh overall tournament win in New Japan, but his first as a member of CHAOS. This was Yoshi-Hashi's first World Tag League win, and his first major tournament victory in New Japan.

On March 6, 2025, at the NJPW 53rd Anniversary Show, Chaos was folded into Main Unit, officially ending the tenure of the stable.

== Other media ==
During their run in the stable together, Okada and Nakamura were featured in the Japanese music video for Pharrell Williams' song "Happy", released in May 2014. In January 2017, it was announced that the Tekken 7: Fated Retribution video game would feature a Chaos shirt as an alternate outfit for all characters.

== Members ==
*	Founding member
I-II	Leader(s)
#	Represented the stable in All Elite Wrestling (AEW)

Member		Tenure
Alex Koslov		June 10, 2012 – January 5, 2015
Black Tiger (V)	*	April 23, 2009 – June 20, 2009
Brian Kendrick		June 18, 2011 – November 6, 2013
Chuck Taylor (Note: Formerly billed as Chuckie T. in NJPW.)	#	October 15, 2017 – February 7, 2019; November 10, 2021 – April 24, 2024
Davey Richards		October 12, 2010 – May 2, 2012
Gedo	*	April 23, 2009 – October 8, 2018
Giant Bernard	*	April 23, 2009 – April 4, 2010
Hideo Saito		June 18, 2011 – December 4, 2011
Hirooki Goto		March 12, 2016 – March 6, 2025
Jado	*	April 23, 2009 – October 8, 2018
Jay Briscoe
Jay White		January 6, 2018 – October 8, 2018
Karl Anderson	*	April 23, 2009 – April 4, 2010
Kazuchika Okada	II	January 4, 2012 – February 24, 2024
Kazushi Sakuraba		June 8, 2014 – July 3, 2016
Kris Statlander	#	October 11, 2021 – May 26, 2024
Lio Rush	#	November 23, 2022 – March 6, 2025
Low Ki		April 21, 2012 – January 4, 2013
Mark Briscoe
Masato Tanaka		August 16, 2009 – December 8, 2013
Mikey Nicholls		February 25, 2019 – May 14, 2022
Orange Cassidy	#	November 10, 2021 – May 29, 2024
Robbie Eagles		June 30, 2019 – March 21, 2023
Rocky Romero	#	October 12, 2010 – March 6, 2025
Shinsuke Nakamura	* I	April 23, 2009 – January 30, 2016
Sho		October 9, 2017 – September 4, 2021
Takashi Iizuka	*	April 23, 2009 – May 25, 2014
Tetsuya Naito		April 4, 2010 – May 26, 2011
Trent Beretta (Note: Formerly billed as Trent? on the independent circuit, and Beretta in NJPW and ROH.)	#	October 15, 2013 – February 7, 2019; November 10, 2021 – April 3, 2024
Tomohiro Ishii	*	April 23, 2009 – March 6, 2025
Toru Yano	*	April 23, 2009 – March 6, 2025
Yujiro Takahashi		April 4, 2010 – May 3, 2014
Wheeler Yuta	#	November 10, 2021 – April 8, 2022
Will Ospreay		March 3, 2016 – October 16, 2020
Yoh		October 9, 2017 – March 6, 2025
Yoshi-Hashi		December 28, 2011 – March 6, 2025

== Sub-groups ==
Affiliate	Members	Tenure	Type	Promotion(s)
Bad Intentions	Giant Bernard; Karl Anderson	2009–2010	Tag team	NJPW; Noah
Best Friends	Trent Beretta; Chuck Taylor	2017–2019; 2021–2024	Tag team	NJPW; ROH; AEW; Independent circuit
Best Friends	Trent Beretta; Chuck Taylor; Orange Cassidy; Kris Statlander; Wheeler Yuta	2021–2024	Stable	AEW
Birds of Prey	Will Ospreay; Robbie Eagles	2019–2020	Tag team	NJPW
Bishamon	Hirooki Goto; Yoshi-Hashi	2021–2025	Tag team	NJPW
Bullet Offenders	Masato Tanaka; Tomohiro Ishii	2010–2012	Tag team	NJPW
Chaos Invincible	Shinsuke Nakamura; Tomohiro Ishii	2012–2016	Tag team	NJPW
Chaos Top Team	Shinsuke Nakamura; Toru Yano	2009–2016	Tag team	NJPW
Chaos World Wrestling Warriors	Low Ki; Brian Kendrick	2012–2013	Tag team	NJPW
Complete Players	Masato Tanaka; Gedo; Jado; Yujiro Takahashi	2009–2013	Quartet	NJPW
Crazy Ichizoku/Bloody Chaos	Toru Yano; Takashi Iizuka	2010–2014	Tag team	NJPW
Forever Hooligans	Alex Koslov; Rocky Romero	2012–2015	Tag team	NJPW; Independent circuit
Flying Tigers	Robbie Eagles; Tiger Mask	2021–2022	Tag team	NJPW
Iron Hades	Takashi Iizuka; Tomohiro Ishii	2009–2014	Tag team	NJPW
Jado & Gedo	Gedo; Jado	2009–2018	Tag team	NJPW
LiYoh	Lio Rush; Yoh	2022–2024	Tag team	NJPW
No Limit	Tetsuya Naito; Yujiro	2010–2011	Tag team	NJPW
No Remorse Corps	Davey Richards; Rocky Romero	2010–2012	Tag team	NJPW; Noah
Roppongi 3K	Sho; Yoh; Rocky Romero (manager)	2017–2021	Tag team	NJPW
Roppongi Vice	Rocky Romero; Beretta	2015–2017; 2022–2024	Tag team	NJPW; ROH; AEW; Independent circuit

== Championships and accomplishments ==
- All Elite Wrestling
  - AEW International Championship (2 times) – Orange Cassidy
  - AEW TBS Championship (1 time) – Statlander
  - 2023 Casino Tag Team Royale – Cassidy and Danhausen
- Consejo Mundial de Lucha Libre
  - NWA World Historic Welterweight Championship (1 time) – Rocky Romero
- Dramatic Dream Team
  - Ironman Heavymetalweight Championship (1 time) – Jado
- Guts World Pro Wrestling
  - GWC Tag Team Championship (1 time) – Tanaka with Daisuke
  - GWC Tag Team Title Tournament (2009) – Tanaka with Daisuke
- Impact Wrestling
  - Impact X Division Championship (1 time) – Lio Rush
- Major League Wrestling
  - MLW World Middleweight Championship (1 time) – Rocky Romero
- Melbourne City Wrestling
  - MCW Intercommonwealth Championship (1 time) – Ospreay
- Millennium Wrestling Federation
  - MWF Heavyweight Championship (1 time) – Low Ki
- New Japan Pro-Wrestling
  - IWGP Heavyweight Championship (9 times) (Note: During Okada's sixth and seventh reigns, and Goto's first reign, the title was called the IWGP World Heavyweight Championship.) – Nakamura (1), Okada (7), and Goto (1)
  - IWGP Intercontinental Championship (9 times) (Note: With the reactivation of the IWGP Heavyweight Championship and the restored and combined histories of both it, the World Heavyweight, and the Intercontinental titles, all former IWGP World Heavyweight Champions are retroactively recognized as having been an IWGP Intercontinental Champion.) – Tanaka (1), Nakamura (5), Okada (2), and Goto (1)
  - IWGP Tag Team Championship (7 times) – Naito and Takahashi (1), Iizuka and Yano (1), Ishii and Yano (1), and Goto and Yoshi-Hashi (4)
  - IWGP Junior Heavyweight Championship (6 times) – Low Ki (2), Ospreay (3), and Eagles (1)
  - IWGP Junior Heavyweight Tag Team Championship (14 times) – Richards and Romero (2), Koslov and Romero (2), Beretta and Romero (4), Sho and Yoh (5), and Eagles with Tiger Mask (1) (Note: Eagles is a member of CHAOS, whereas Tiger Mask is a part of the NJPW main unit; this championship is counted under both the CHAOS and main unit banners)
  - Strong Openweight Tag Team Championship (1 time) – Goto and Yoshi-Hashi
  - IWGP United States Championship (1 time) – White
  - NEVER Openweight 6-Man Tag Team Championship (6 times) – Beretta, Ishii and Yano (1), Goto, Ishii and Yoshi-Hashi (1), Goto, Yoshi-Hashi and Yoh (1), Okada and Ishii with Tanahashi (1) and Yano with Tanahashi and Boltin (2)
  - NEVER Openweight Championship (13 times) – Tanaka (1), Goto (5), Ospreay (1), and Ishii (6)
  - KOPW (2 official and 3 provisional times) – Yano
  - Best of the Super Juniors (2016, 2019) – Ospreay
  - G1 Climax (2011) – Nakamura
  - G1 Climax (2012, 2014, 2021, 2022) – Okada
  - G1 Tag League (2009) – Bernard and Anderson
  - New Japan Cup (2013, 2019) – Okada
  - New Japan Cup (2014) – Nakamura
  - New Japan Rumble (2016) – Jado
  - Super J Tag League (2010) – Gedo and Jado
  - Super Junior Tag Tournament (2016) – Beretta and Romero
  - Super Junior Tag Tournament/Super Junior Tag League (2017, 2018, 2019) – Sho and Yoh
  - Super Junior Tag League (2022) – Lio and Yoh
  - World Tag League (2021, 2022, 2023) – Goto and Yoshi-Hashi
- Nikkan Sports
  - Match of the Year Award (2009) – Nakamura vs. Hiroshi Tanahashi on November 8
  - Match of the Year Award (2014) – Nakamura vs. Kazuchika Okada on August 10
  - Technique Award (2011) – Tanaka
  - Technique Award (2012) – Nakamura
- Pro Wrestling Australia
  - PWA Heavyweight Championship (1 time) – Ospreay
- Pro Wrestling Illustrated
  - Ranked Okada No. 1 in its PWI 500 ranking of the top singles wrestlers in 2017
- Pro Wrestling Noah
  - GHC Junior Heavyweight Tag Team Championship (1 time) – Gedo and Jado
  - GHC Tag Team Championship (2 times) – Iizuka and Yano (1), Yano and Marufuji (1)
  - Global Tag League (2016) – Yano and Marufuji
- Pro Wrestling Prestige
  - PWP Tag Team Championship (1 time) – Richards with Kyle O'Reilly
- Pro Wrestling Zero1
  - NWA Intercontinental Tag Team Championship (1 time) – Tanaka with Zeus
  - World Heavyweight Championship (1 time) – Tanaka
  - Fire Festival (2012) – Tanaka
  - Furinkazan (2011) – Tanaka with Fujita Hayato
  - Best Bout (2011) – Tanaka vs. Daisuke Sekimoto on August 7
- Revolution Pro Wrestling
  - British Cruiserweight Championship (1 time) – Ospreay
  - British Heavyweight Championship (3 times) – Ishii (2) and Ospreay (1)
- Ring of Honor
  - ROH World Championship (1 time) – Richards
  - ROH World Tag Team Championship (1 time) – Koslov and Romero
  - ROH World Television Championship (2 times) – Ishii (1) and Ospreay (1)
  - ROH Pure Championship (1 time) – Wheeler Yuta
- Tokyo Sports
  - Best Bout Award (2011) Iizuka and Yano vs. Keiji Mutoh and Kenta Kobashi on August 27
  - Best Bout Award (2012) Okada vs. Hiroshi Tanahashi on June 16
  - Best Bout Award (2013) Nakamura vs. Kota Ibushi on August 4
  - Best Bout Award (2014) Nakamura vs. Okada on August 10
  - Best Bout Award (2015) Okada vs. Genichiro Tenryu on November 15
  - Best Bout Award (2016) Okada vs. Naomichi Marufuji on July 18
  - Best Bout Award (2017) Okada vs. Kenny Omega on January 4
  - Best Bout Award (2018) Okada vs. Kenny Omega on June 9
  - Best Bout Award (2019) Okada vs. Sanada on October 14
  - Best Bout Award (2022) Okada vs. Will Ospreay on August 18
  - Best Bout Award (2024) Goto vs. Yota Tsuji on March 20
  - MVP Award (2012, 2013, 2015, 2019, 2022) – Okada
  - Outstanding Performance Award (2014) – Ishii
  - Technique Award (2012) – Nakamura
  - Best Tag Team Award (2023) - Goto and Yoshi-Hashi
- Total Nonstop Action Wrestling
  - TNA X Division Championship (1 time) – Kendrick
- Wrestling Observer Newsletter
  - Best Brawler (2014–2019) – Ishii
  - Best Flying Wrestler (2016–2019) – Ospreay
  - Best Wrestling Maneuver (2012–2013) Okada's Rainmaker
  - Feud of the Year (2012–2013) Okada vs. Hiroshi Tanahashi
  - Most Charismatic (2014–2015) – Nakamura
  - Most Improved (2012) – Okada
  - Pro Wrestling Match of the Year (2013) Okada vs. Hiroshi Tanahashi on April 7
  - Pro Wrestling Match of the Year (2015) Nakamura vs. Kota Ibushi on January 4
  - Pro Wrestling Match of the Year (2016) Okada vs. Hiroshi Tanahashi on January 4
  - Wrestler of the Year (2014) – Nakamura
  - Wrestler of the Year (2017) – Okada
  - Wrestling Observer Newsletter Hall of Fame (Class of 2015) – Nakamura
