= Great Bash Heel =

Professional wrestling stable

Tag team
- Name: Great Bash Heel
- Former members: See below
- Debut: October 2, 2006
- Disbanded: March 6, 2025
- Years active: 2006–2025

Great Bash Heel (グレート・バッシュ・ヒール, Gurēto Basshu Hīru), often abbreviated to G・B・H, was a professional wrestling stable and tag team in New Japan Pro-Wrestling (NJPW).

Originally formed by Hiroyoshi Tenzan in October 2006, G・B・H was the top villainous group in NJPW until April 2009, when the rest of the group turned on their leader, Togi Makabe, and formed a new stable named Chaos, under the leadership of Shinsuke Nakamura. Since 2010, G・B・H has operated as a tag team consisting of Makabe and Tomoaki Honma.

On March 6, 2025, at the NJPW 53rd Anniversary Show, both Chaos and GBH folded were into Main Unit, officially ending the tenure of the stable.

== History ==
=== Formation (2006) ===
On October 2, 2006, Hiroyoshi Tenzan, fresh off his G1 Climax triumph and a big win over former mentor Masahiro Chono and on his way to challenging for the IWGP Heavyweight Championship, announced the formation of his first stable and named former interim IWGP Tag Team Champions, Togi Makabe and Shiro Koshinaka, as his first recruits. Tenzan announced that the criteria for joining his group was to "be strong, bad and cool" and that the intention of his new stable was to revive the old "beautiful New Japan". Tenzan immediately began sending out invitations to other New Japan wrestlers, such as Yuji Nagata, Manabu Nakanishi and even Makabe's and Koshinaka's blood rivals, Tomohiro Ishii and Toru Yano, to join the group, which was unofficially named Mougyu Ikka. On October 9, Tenzan failed in his attempt to regain the IWGP Heavyweight Championship from Hiroshi Tanahashi, but despite the setback, announced that his quest had only just begun. Finally on October 15, Tenzan announced that the official name of his stable was Great Bash Heel, G・B・H., and named their goal to become the biggest villainous group in New Japan history by causing "grievous bodily harm", something the group's name was also a reference to. The following day, Tenzan orchestrated a truce between the teams of Makabe and Koshinaka and Tomohiro Ishii and Toru Yano, who became the fourth and fifth member of G・B・H.

=== Makabe takes over (2006–2009) ===
G・B・H. were then engulfed in a three–way war with the New Japan Seikigun, led by Yuji Nagata, and BLACK, led by Masahiro Chono. While Tenzan began touring All Japan Pro Wrestling (AJPW) in December, Makabe acted as the de facto leader of G・B・H. The group then attempted to simultaneously capture both the World Tag Team Championship and IWGP Tag Team Championship, but failed on both attempts. In February 2007, G・B・H. was joined by Tomoaki Honma and he was followed by veteran tag team of Jado and Gedo in July, while the following month, Koshinaka turned on G・B・H. and joined Masahiro Chono's new Legend stable. After being pinned by Koshinaka in a tag team match between G・B・H. and Legend, Tenzan announced that he was going to be taking some time off to heal himself up. With his regular tag team partner gone from G・B・H., Makabe formed a new tag team with Toru Yano and together the two of them entered the 2007 G1 Tag League, along with their stablemates, Gedo and Jado. Makabe and Yano would make it to the semifinals of the tournament, before being defeated by the eventual winners of the whole tournament, Giant Bernard and Travis Tomko of RISE, a spinoff group of BLACK, led by Shinsuke Nakamura. After the tournament, Makabe and Yano would remain together as a tag team, eventually naming the unit "Most Violent Players" (MVP). On January 4, 2008, at Wrestle Kingdom II in Tokyo Dome, MVP faced Total Nonstop Action Wrestling (TNA) tag team Team 3D (Brother Devon and Brother Ray) in a hardcore tag team match in a losing effort.

After spending months sidelined, Hiroyoshi Tenzan finally made his return to New Japan on February 17, but after he, Gedo, Jado and Ishii were defeated by Legend in an eight-man tag team match, the rest of G・B・H. turned on their leader and kicked him out of the group. Later that same night, Makabe and Yano defeated Giant Bernard and Travis Tomko to win the IWGP Tag Team Championship, G・B・H.'s first title in New Japan. As the former leader of G・B・H., Tenzan had difficulties in finding new allies, however, long time Seikigun member Takashi Iizuka was the first to accept him and the two went on to form a tag team. Karl Anderson joined the unit on March 13 after assisting Makabe, Yano & Ishii beat down Tenzan & Iizuka. On April 27, Tenzan and Iizuka challenged Makabe and Yano for the IWGP Tag Team Championship, however, Iizuka ended up turning on Tenzan and joining G・B・H. Tenzan would find new allies in Legend and Satoshi Kojima and would spend the rest of the year feuding with the stable he had created. On September 5, 2008, former RISE member, Low Ki, made his return to New Japan, attacking Jyushin Thunder Liger and Tiger Mask, before being revealed as the newest member of G・B・H. The same day, Giant Bernard and Rick Fuller turned on RISE and joined G・B・H. Fuller would, however, leave the promotion shortly after his first appearance as a member of G・B・H. On September 21, Low Ki defeated Tiger Mask to win the IWGP Junior Heavyweight Championship. Both of G・B・H.'s title reigns ended on January 4, 2009, at Wrestle Kingdom III in Tokyo Dome, when Low Ki lost the Junior Heavyweight Championship back to Tiger Mask and MVP lost the Tag Team Championship to Team 3D in a hardcore rematch of their encounter from the previous year. Val Venis joined the unit briefly and lost a singles match against Hiroshi Tanahashi, Black Tiger (played by Rocky Romero) also joined briefly to feud with Tiger Mask over the Junior Heavyweight Championship after Ki's departure.

=== Betrayal (2009–2012) ===
On April 5, G・B・H. co–leader Togi Makabe faced RISE leader Shinsuke Nakamura in a singles match, at the end of which Yano turned on both Makabe and Tomoaki Honma and helped Nakamura pick up the win. Nakamura would assume leadership of G・B・H, having the support of all members except Makabe (who was taking time off) & Honma. G・B・H would continue to be led by Nakamura as different members defeated Honma in singles matches before Makabe returned and declared that he and Honma were the true members of G・B・H. 2 nights later on the 23rd, Nakamura announced that He, Toru Yano, Takashi Iizuka, Giant Bernard, Karl Anderson, Tomohiro Ishii, Black Tiger (being played by Tatsuhito Takaiwa after Romero's unmasking on April 5), Jado and Gedo would form a new unit, Chaos (RISE was also ignored). G・B・H would then align with the New Japan Seikigun, turning them babyface. The events would kickstart Makabe's singles career and quest for the IWGP Heavyweight Championship, which he would win on May 3, 2010, and although he and Tomoaki Honma, the only member of G・B・H. to remain loyal to him, would occasionally wrestle together under the G・B・H. banner, the stable was effectively dissolved. On March 28, 2012, New Japan released Honma from his contract, officially ending G・B・H.

=== Reformation and dissolution (2013–2025) ===
On March 23, 2013, Togi Makabe, who had recently begun feuding with Chaos member Yujiro Takahashi, teamed with Hiroyoshi Tenzan and Satoshi Kojima in a six-man tag team match, where they faced Takahashi, Takashi Iizuka and Yoshi-Hashi. After Kojima had pinned Yoshi-Hashi for the win, Iizuka hit both him and Tenzan with a steel chair, after which Takahashi began choking out his rival Makabe with his own steel chain. This led to Tomoaki Honma making his return to New Japan, one year after his firing from the promotion, chasing Chaos out of the ring and helping Makabe backstage. The reunited G・B・H. had their first match back together on April 7 at Invasion Attack, where they were defeated by Takahashi and Masato Tanaka in a tag team match. In late 2013, G・B・H. started feuding with the Bullet Club stable. In December, Makabe and Honma made it to the semifinals of the 2013 World Tag League, before being eliminated by the Bullet Club team of Doc Gallows and Karl Anderson. G・B・H. continued teaming sporadically throughout 2014 and in November took part in the 2014 World Tag League, but this time finished last in their block with a record of three wins and four losses. Throughout 2015 both Makabe and Honma were involved in the NEVER Openweight Championship picture with Makabe winning the title twice from Tomohiro Ishii, who defeated Honma twice in his attempts to win his first NJPW title. In November, Makabe and Honma reunited for the 2015 World Tag League, winning their block with a record of four wins and two losses and advancing to the finals of the tournament. On December 9, they defeated Los Ingobernables de Japón (Evil and Tetsuya Naito) in the finals to win the 2015 World Tag League.

On January 4, 2016, at Wrestle Kingdom 10 in Tokyo Dome, Makabe and Honma defeated Bullet Club's Doc Gallows and Karl Anderson to win the IWGP Tag Team Championship. They lost the title to Guerrillas of Destiny (Tama Tonga and Tanga Loa) on April 10 at Invasion Attack 2016. On October 23, Honma and Makabe made an appearance for Pro Wrestling Noah, unsuccessfully challenging Naomichi Marufuji and Toru Yano for the GHC Tag Team Championship. In December, Makabe and Honma advanced to the finals of the 2016 World Tag League by winning their block with a record of five wins and two losses. On December 10, Makabe and Honma defeated the reigning IWGP Tag Team Champions Guerrillas of Destiny to win the 2016 World Tag League, becoming the first ever team to win the tournament in two consecutive years. On January 4, 2017 at Wrestle Kingdom 11 in Tokyo Dome, Makabe and Honma took part in a three-way match for the IWGP Tag Team Championship, which was won by Tomohiro Ishii and Toru Yano. After missing the better part of 2017 and 2018 due to injury caused by Jado, Honma returned to the ring although he was a shadow of his former self. With Great Bash Heel seemingly out of tag team title contention, the alliance formed between the Main Unit and Chaos led to Makabe, Toru Yano and Ryusuke Taguchi teaming up. They ended up earning the right to challenge Bullet Club for the NEVER Openweight 6-Man Tag Team Championship at New Year Dash!! 2019, at Wrestle Kingdom 13.

Six years later, on March 6, 2025, at the NJPW 53th Anniversary Show, G・B・H was folded into Main Unit, officially ending the tenure of the stable.

== Members ==
Member		Time
Shiro Koshinaka	*	October 2, 2006 - August 11, 2007
Hiroyoshi Tenzan	*I	October 2, 2006 - February 17, 2008
Togi Makabe	*V	October 2, 2006 – March 6, 2025
Toru Yano	II	October 16, 2006 - April 23, 2009
Tomohiro Ishii		October 16, 2006 - April 23, 2009
Tomoaki Honma		February 2007 - March 28, 2012; March 23, 2013 – March 6, 2025
Jado		August 26, 2007 - April 23, 2009
Gedo		August 26, 2007 - April 23, 2009
Karl Anderson		March 13, 2008 - April 23, 2009
Takashi Iizuka	III	April 27, 2008 - April 23, 2009
Rick Fuller		September 5, 2008 - November 5, 2008
Low Ki		September 5, 2008 - January 4, 2009
Giant Bernard		September 5, 2008 - April 23, 2009
Val Venis		March 8, 2009 - March 21, 2009
Black Tiger IV (Rocky Romero)		March 14, 2009 - April 5, 2009
Shinsuke Nakamura	IV	April 5, 2009 - April 23, 2009
Black Tiger V (Tatsuhito Takaiwa)		April 5, 2009 - April 23, 2009

=== Sub-groups ===
Group name	Members	Tenure	Type
Jado & Gedo	Jado; Gedo	2007-2009	Tag team
Bad Intentions	Giant Bernard; Karl Anderson	2008-2009	Tag team

== Championships and accomplishments ==
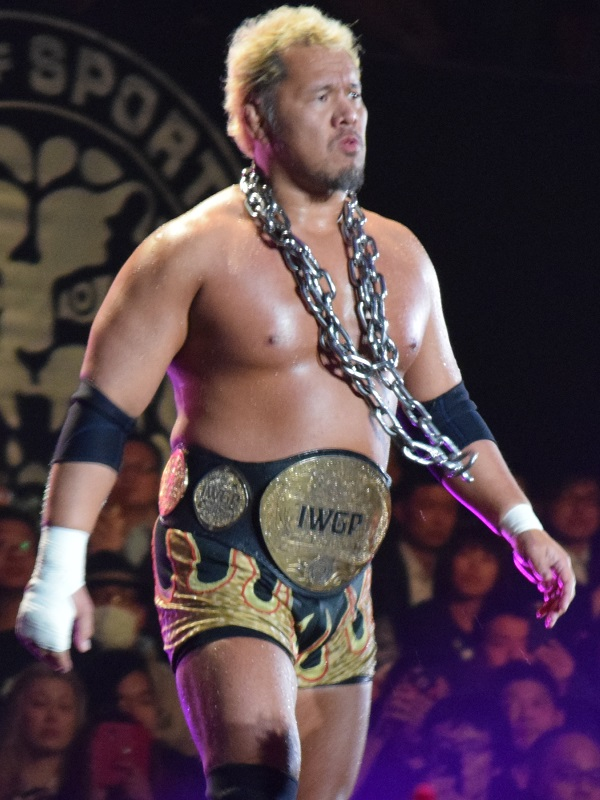
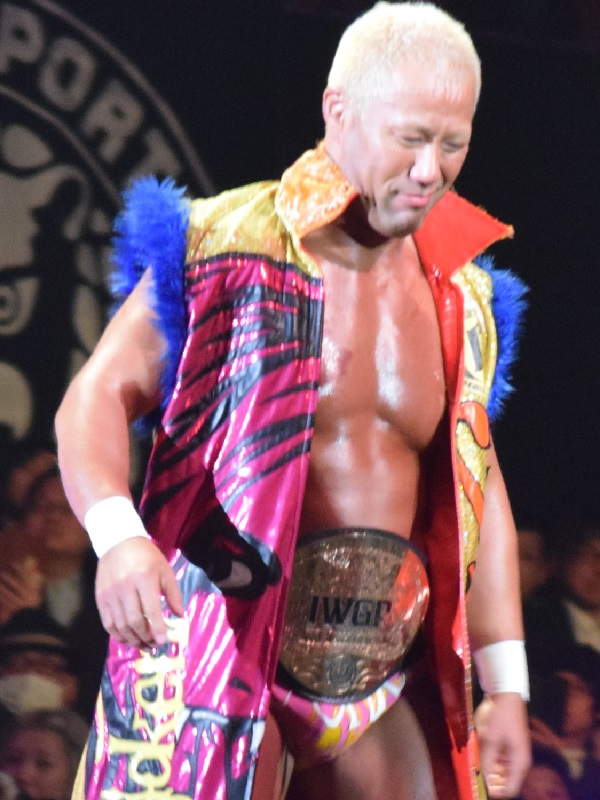
Togi Makabe and Tomoaki Honma as the IWGP Tag Team Champions in February 2016
- Apache Pro-Wrestling Army
  - WEW Heavyweight Championship (3 times) – Makabe (1), Yano (1) and Ishii (1)
- New Japan Pro-Wrestling
  - IWGP Heavyweight Championship (1 time) – Makabe
  - IWGP Junior Heavyweight Championship (1 time) – Ki
  - IWGP Tag Team Championship (2 times) – Makabe and Yano (1) and Honma and Makabe (1)
  - NEVER Openweight Championship (2 times) – Makabe
  - NEVER Openweight 6-Man Tag Team Championship (1 time) – Makabe (with Toru Yano and Ryusuke Taguchi) (1 time)
  - G1 Climax (2009) – Makabe
  - World Tag League (2015, 2016) – Honma and Makabe
- Tokyo Sports
  - Fighting Spirit Award (2009) – Makabe
  - Tag Team of the Year (2007) – Makabe and Yano
  - Technique Award (2015) – Honma
