= Yujiro Takahashi =

Japanese professional wrestler

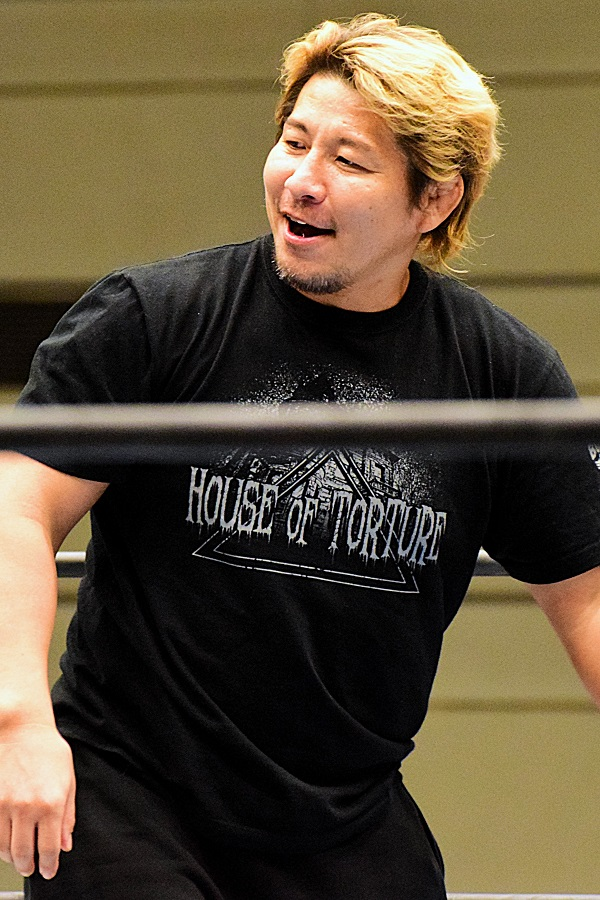
- Takahashi in November 2022

Personal information
- Born: January 13, 1981 (age 45) Niigata, Niigata, Japan

Professional wrestling career
- Ring name(s): Yujiro Takahashi; Yujiro
- Billed height: 1.78 m (5 ft 10 in)
- Billed weight: 90 kg (198 lb)
- Trained by: NJPW Dojo
- Debut: July 26, 2004

Yujiro Takahashi (高橋 裕二郎, Takahashi Yūjirō; born January 13, 1981) is a Japanese professional wrestler. He is signed to New Japan Pro-Wrestling (NJPW), where he is a member of House of Torture.

Takahashi entered New Japan in November 2003 with an extensive amateur background, advancing through the dojo and debuting on July 26, 2004, under his full name. He later shortened his name to Yujiro (裕次郎, Yūjirō). From 2007 to 2008, he was a member of the stable Samurai Gym with El Samurai and Ryusuke Taguchi, which ended when Samurai left the company. In 2010, he joined Chaos, where he was a one-time IWGP Tag Team and Junior Heavyweight Tag Team Champion with Tetsuya Naito, with whom he teamed as No Limit. In 2014, Takahashi defected to Bullet Club, becoming the first non-gaijin member to join the stable. As a member of Bullet Club and House of Torture, he is a one-time NEVER Openweight Champion and a four-time NEVER Openweight 6-Man Tag Team Champion. During his time in Chaos, he had a "ladies' man" gimmick, which was carried on in Bullet Club. He is referred to as the "Tokyo Pimp" and is often accompanied to the ring by go-go dancer, the "Tokyo Latina" Pieter.

== Professional wrestling career ==
=== New Japan Pro-Wrestling (2004–2009) ===
Yujiro Takahashi, an esteemed Greco Roman wrestler in college passed the New Japan Pro-Wrestling (NJPW) dojo entry test in November 2003, making his debut on July 26, 2004, in a loss to Naofumi Yamamoto at Korakuen Hall. Takahashi shortened his ring name to simply "Yujiro" shortly thereafter, debuting the name in a match against Akiya Anzawa on September 2, 2004. Yujiro later entered the 7-man, single-elimination Young Lion Toukon Tournament on October 31, 2004, losing to Hirooki Goto in the first round. Yujiro continued to wrestle other young lions such as Anzawa, Goto, Yamamoto and Ryusuke Taguchi through 2004 and early 2005, before entering the Young Lion Cup in March 2005; he finished sixth place out of seven with four points, defeating Akiya Anzawa and Tommy Williams during the group stage. On November 4, 2005, Yujiro defeated former IWGP Junior Heavyweight Champion Masayuki Naruse, pinning him with an inside cradle. During the match, Naruse hit several stiff slaps and kicks to the face, breaking Yujiro's jaw and causing him to bleed from the mouth, forcing him out of action for the rest of the year. Yujiro returned from injury on March 4, 2006, defeating fellow young lion Mitsuhide Hirasawa in the opening match. Yujiro continued to wrestle in the undercard for the remainder of the year.

On January 27, 2007, Yujiro participated in a one-night tournament to decide the #1 contender to the IWGP Junior Heavyweight title, also including Wataru Inoue, Ryusuke Taguchi and Prince Devitt; Devitt received a bye to the finals due to Taguchi suffering a right eye injury, and Inoue defeated Yujiro, defeating Devitt in the final as well. On March 18, 2007, Yujiro joined a new mini-faction started by El Samurai called Samurai Gym, along with Ryusuke Taguchi. Yujiro received an opportunity at the junior title by traditional means a few months later, unsuccessfully challenging champion Minoru on May 22, 2007 in his first title shot in New Japan. After nearly three years with the company, Yujiro entered his first Best of the Super Juniors tournament in June 2007, earning 4 points in the group stage by defeating Prince Devitt by forfeit and eventual winner Milano Collection A.T. by pinfall. Yujiro finished in sixth place out of seven in his block.

On February 1, 2008, it was announced that El Samurai would be leaving NJPW due to his contract expiring, effectively ending Samurai Gym. Shortly afterward, Yujiro formed a tag team with fellow rookie Tetsuya Naito called No Limit. In March, the two went to fifteen-minute time limit draws with former IWGP Junior Heavyweight Tag Team Championship teams such as Koji Kanemoto and Wataru Inoue, and Minoru and Prince Devitt, and Yujiro pinned veteran Super Strong Machine in a trios match. All of this led to a junior tag title challenge for the duo, facing Machine's Legend stablemates Jyushin Thunder Liger and Akira, in which No Limit came up short when Akira pinned Naito. Yujiro would then participate in the ongoing feud between New Japan and Pro Wrestling Zero1, teaming with Koji Kanemoto and Manabu Nakanishi in two separate tag team matches, losing to Zero1's Masato Tanaka and Tatsuhito Takaiwa in the former, and defeating Takao Omori and Osamu Namiguchi in the latter.

In May 2008, Yujiro and Naito underwent a five-match series with some of New Japan's top tag teams, dubbed "No Limit Generation Smash", held in the various Zepp clubs across Japan. The teams included Jado and Gedo, Togi Makabe and Toru Yano, Wataru Inoue and Koji Kanemoto, Shinsuke Nakamura and Hirooki Goto, and Yuji Nagata and Manabu Nakanishi. No Limit lost all five matches. A special sixth match in the series took place in Zero1 on May 29, 2008, Yujiro and Naito defeated Zero1's Osamu Namiguchi and Shito Ueda. In June 2008, Yujiro entered the Best of the Super Juniors tournament, going winless in his first four matches before defeating Minoru in his final bout to finish with two points. The following month, Yujiro participated in a single-elimination tournament to decide the new holder of the recently vacated IWGP Junior Heavyweight title. He defeated Naito in the first round, before falling to Prince Devitt in the quarterfinals. On October 13, 2008, at Destruction '08, Yujiro and Naito defeated Devitt and Minoru to win the IWGP Junior Heavyweight Tag Team Championship. On January 4, 2009, at Wrestle Kingdom III, the Motor City Machine Guns (Alex Shelley and Chris Sabin) defeated them to win the tag team titles.

=== Total Nonstop Action Wrestling (2009) ===
Shortly after losing the IWGP Junior Heavyweight Tag Team Championship, Yujiro and Naito traveled to North America for a "developmental tour", something often done with young Japanese wrestlers to expose them to other styles of wrestling and help them develop into better wrestlers. No Limit worked mainly for Total Nonstop Action Wrestling (TNA), while also making an appearance for both Team 3D's wrestling academy and Jersey All Pro Wrestling, although Naito was not able to wrestle in JAPW due to an injury and was replaced by the team's TNA ally Sheik Abdul Bashir. Yujiro and Naito worked for TNA approximately two months, receiving another unsuccessful shot at the IWGP Junior Heavyweight Tag Team Championship. No Limit's final appearance for TNA was a handicap match on the May 14, 2009, edition of Impact! against Kevin Nash, which the team lost.

=== Consejo Mundial de Lucha Libre (2009) ===
No Limit made their debut for Consejo Mundial de Lucha Libre (CMLL) in Mexico City, Mexico on May 29, 2009 teaming with Dos Caras Jr. to defeat Héctor Garza, La Sombra and Volador Jr. No Limit were presented as "Anti-Mexican" heels ("bad guys") and soon began teaming with Okumura under the name La Ola Amarilla (Spanish for "The Yellow Wave") in matches against Mexicans. On July 10, 2009 No Limit teamed with Black Warrior to defeat the team of Héctor Garza, Toscano and El Sagrado, After the match Black Warrior made a challenge on behalf of Yujiro (as Yujiro does not speak Spanish) for a "hair vs. hair" match with Garza. This led to all men being involved in a 15-man steel cage Luchas de Apuestas match at Infierno en el Ring that Naito won by pinning Toscano, forcing him to have his hair shaved off. Following the match No Limit's focus was on Black Warrior, who had turned on them during the cage match. When Jyushin Thunder Liger toured Mexico in September, 2009 he joined the "Anti-Mexico" faction, teaming with No Limit and Okumura to defeat Team Mexico (Último Guerrero, Atlantis, Black Warrior and Héctor Garza) at the CMLL 76th Anniversary Show on September 18, 2009. The following week Yujiro teamed with Okumura to win the 2009 Gran Alternativa tournament, defeating Toscano and Rouge in the first round, Héctor Garza and Ángel de Plata in the second round and Místico and Ángel de Oro in the finals. The storyline feud between No Limit and Black Warrior reached its conclusion on October 16, 2009 as Black Warrior faced Yujiro in a Lucha de Apuesta, hair vs. hair match that Yujiro won two falls to one, forcing Black Warrior to have his hair shaved off after the match. After the storyline with Black Warrior ended, No Limit began working with the team of El Texano Jr. and El Terrible in a feud that led to a Lucha de Apuesta hair vs. hair match between the two teams that was the main event of CMLL's Sin Salida show on December 4, 2009. After being successful throughout the summer and fall No Limit finally lost to Texano Jr. and Terrible at Sin Salida and were both shaved completely bald after the match per Lucha Libre traditions.

=== Return to NJPW ===
==== Chaos (2010–2014) ====
On December 5, 2009, NJPW announced that Yujiro and Naito were returning to Japan as part of their annual January 4 Tokyo Dome show called Wrestle Kingdom IV. At the event Yujiro and Naito defeated Team 3D (Brother Ray and Brother Devon) and Bad Intentions (Giant Bernard and Karl Anderson) in a three-way hardcore match to win the IWGP Tag Team Championship. No Limit had their first title defense on February 14, 2010, defeating El Texano Jr. and El Terrible to retain the title. He began using his full name again in February 2010 to signal his progress. On April 4 at New Dimension No Limit joined New Japan's top heel stable Chaos, led by the IWGP Heavyweight Champion Shinsuke Nakamura. On May 3, 2010, at Wrestling Dontaku, Takahashi and Naito lost the IWGP Tag Team Championship to Seigigun (Yuji Nagata and Wataru Inoue) in a three-way match, which also included Bad Intentions (Giant Bernard and Karl Anderson). On October 24 No Limit entered the G1 Tag League. After three wins and two losses, they finished first in their block and advanced to the semifinals. On November 7, after defeating Manabu Nakanishi and Strong Man in the semifinals, No Limit was defeated in the finals of the tournament by Nagata and Inoue. On December 11, 2010, No Limit picked up a major win by defeating the TNA World Tag Team Champions, The Motor City Machine Guns (Alex Shelley and Chris Sabin), in a non–title match. On May 3, 2011, No Limit failed in their attempt to regain the IWGP Tag Team Championship from Bad Intentions. After the match, Takahashi walked out on Naito. In May 2011 Takahashi took part in New Japan's first tour of the United States, the Invasion Tour 2011. On May 13 in Rahway, New Jersey, he entered the tournament to determine the first ever IWGP Intercontinental Champion, defeating Hideo Saito in his first round match. The following day in New York City, Takahashi was eliminated from the tournament in the semifinal stage by his Chaos stablemate Toru Yano. Upon their return to Japan, Takahashi turned on Naito on May 26, effectively dissolving No Limit. Takahashi then joined Gedo, Jado and Masato Tanaka as the fourth member of the Chaos sub-group Complete Players. On June 18 at Dominion 6.18, Takahashi defeated Naito in the first match between the former members of No Limit. The two had a rematch on August 1 during the first day of the G1 Climax, where Takahashi was once again victorious. Despite his strong start in the tournament, Takahashi only managed to win two more out of his eight remaining matches, finishing second to last in his block, whereas his former partner made it all the way to the finals. On September 19, Naito defeated Takahashi in the third singles match between the two. In the G1 Tag League, Takahashi teamed with Masato Tanaka with the team picking up three wins in their five group stage matches, including a win over the reigning IWGP Tag Team Champions, Bad Intentions, on October 30. However, a loss to Tetsuya Naito and Tomoaki Honma on October 4, with Naito again pinning Takahashi, meant that Takahashi and Tanaka narrowly missed advancing to the semifinals of the tournament. Takahashi then got involved in Tanaka's IWGP Intercontinental Championship rivalry with MVP, which built to a tag team match on January 4, 2012, at Wrestle Kingdom VI, where Takahashi and Tanaka were defeated by MVP and Shelton Benjamin. On March 11, Takahashi unsuccessfully challenged Hirooki Goto for the IWGP Intercontinental Championship.

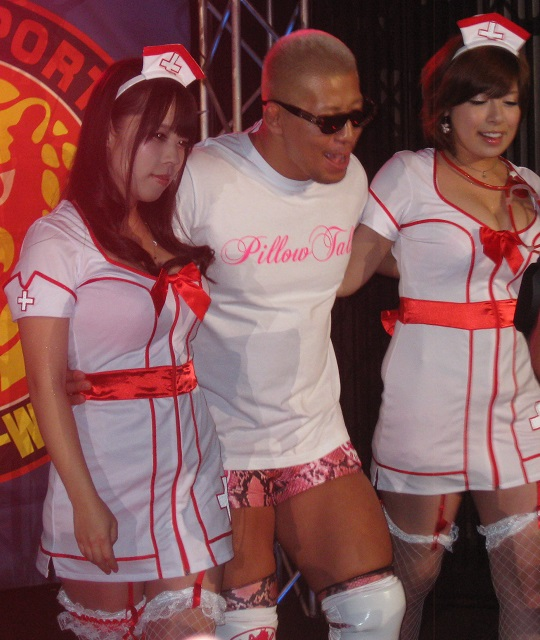
Takahashi in his "ladies' man" gimmick in June 2013

On May 10, 2012, Takahashi returned to Mexico for another tour with CMLL. During his first month back in Mexico, Takahashi mainly feuded with CMLL World Light Heavyweight Champion Rush, which built to a match on June 5, where Takahashi unsuccessfully challenged Rush for his title. Takahashi then transitioned into feuding with CMLL World Heavyweight Champion El Terrible, but again was unsuccessful in his title challenge on June 24. Takahashi ended his two-month excursion and returned to Japan on July 6. On September 17, Takahashi picked up a major win by pinning IWGP Heavyweight Champion Hiroshi Tanahashi in an eight-man tag team main event. On October 8, Takahashi defeated Naito via referee stoppage, after taking advantage of his injured knee, after which he was named the number one contender to the IWGP Heavyweight Championship. On October 21, Takahashi again pinned Tanahashi in a six-man tag team main event. On November 11 at Power Struggle, Takahashi received his first shot at the IWGP Heavyweight Championship, but was defeated by Tanahashi. On November 15, Takahashi participated in the NEVER Openweight Championship tournament, but was eliminated in his first round match by Karl Anderson. From November 20 to December 1, Takahashi took part in the round-robin portion of the World Tag League, alongside Complete Players stablemate Masato Tanaka. The team finished with a record of three wins and three losses, failing to advance from their block. On January 4, 2013, at Wrestle Kingdom 7, Takahashi represented Chaos in an eight-man tag team match, where he, Bob Sapp, Takashi Iizuka and Toru Yano were defeated by Akebono, Manabu Nakanishi, MVP and Strong Man. Later that same event, Takahashi also helped Masato Tanaka retain the NEVER Openweight Championship against Shelton Benjamin.

The following month, Takahashi started a new rivalry with Togi Makabe. The two first met each other in a singles match on February 10 at The New Beginning, where Makabe was victorious. On March 11, Takahashi avenged the loss by defeating Makabe in the first round of the New Japan Cup. Six days later, Takahashi, debuting a new "ladies' man" gimmick, was eliminated from the tournament in the second round by Davey Boy Smith Jr. On March 23, Tomoaki Honma returned to New Japan to support Makabe in his war with Takahashi and Chaos. Takahashi and Makabe faced off in another singles match on May 3 at Wrestling Dontaku, where Makabe was victorious. On June 22, Takahashi was defeated in another grudge match by former partner Tetsuya Naito, who was making his return to the ring from an eight-month break due to a knee injury. The two had a rematch on August 1 on the opening day of the G1 Climax, where Takahashi was victorious. When the tournament concluded on August 11, Takahashi finished in the middle of the block with a record of four wins and five losses, failing to advance to the finals. On October 14 at King of Pro-Wrestling, Takahashi unsuccessfully challenged former partner Tetsuya Naito for the NEVER Openweight Championship and the number one contendership to the IWGP Heavyweight Championship.

==== Bullet Club (2014–2021) ====
In April 2014, after being left off the Wrestle Kingdom 8, Invasion Attack and Wrestling Dontaku cards and losing in the first round of the New Japan Cup, Takahashi began portraying a new disgruntled character, walking out on his Chaos partners either during a match or immediately afterwards. On May 3 at Wrestling Dontaku, Takahashi turned on Chaos and jumped to Bullet Club by helping A.J. Styles defeat Kazuchika Okada for the IWGP Heavyweight Championship. Takahashi wrestled his first match as a member of Bullet Club on May 25 at Back to the Yokohama Arena and, later that same event, entered the NEVER Openweight Championship picture by attacking the reigning champion, former Chaos stablemate Tomohiro Ishii. On June 29, Takahashi defeated Ishii with help from the rest of Bullet Club to become the fourth NEVER Openweight Champion. From July 21 to August 8, Takahashi took part in the G1 Climax, where he finished tied sixth in his block with a record of four wins and six losses. It has been speculated that Takahashi's poor performances in the tournament led to his status in NJPW plummeting in comparison to the likes of Tomoaki Honma and Tomohiro Ishii. On September 23 at Destruction in Okayama, Takahashi made his first successful defense of the NEVER Openweight Championship against former Chaos stablemate Yoshi-Hashi. On October 13 at King of Pro-Wrestling, Takahashi lost the title back to Ishii in his second defense. The following month, Takahashi entered the World Tag League, alongside Styles. Despite a win over the reigning IWGP Tag Team Champions, Bullet Club stablemates Doc Gallows and Karl Anderson, Takahashi and Styles failed to advance from their block with a record of four wins and three losses due to losing to Kazuchika Okada and Yoshi-Hashi on the final day. During 2015, Takahashi took part in the New Japan Cup and G1 Climax tournaments, making it to the second round in the former and finishing the latter with a record of three wins and six losses.

On January 4, 2016, at Wrestle Kingdom 10, Takahashi took part in a match to determine the inaugural NEVER Openweight 6-Man Tag Team Champions, where he and his Bullet Club stablemates Bad Luck Fale and Tama Tonga were defeated by Jay Briscoe, Mark Briscoe and Toru Yano. On February 11 at The New Beginning in Osaka, Takahashi, Fale and Tonga defeated the Briscoes and Yano in a rematch to win the NEVER Openweight 6-Man Tag Team Championship. After a three-day reign, the three lost the title back to the Briscoes and Yano at The New Beginning in Niigata. Takahashi unsuccessfully tried to regain the title with Fale and Kenny Omega, but the three were defeated by Hiroshi Tanahashi, Michael Elgin and Yoshitatsu on April 23. On August 14, Takahashi teamed with Bullet Club's newest member, Hangman Page, to unsuccessfully challenge Jay and Mark Briscoe for the IWGP Tag Team Championship. From November 18 to December 7, Takahashi and Page participated in the World Tag League, where they finished second in block A with record of four wins and three losses, thus failing to advance to the final. On January 4, 2017, at Wrestle Kingdom 11, Takahashi, along with Fale and Page, participated in the first NEVER Openweight 6-Man Tag Team Championship gauntlet match representing Bullet Club, however, the team was unsuccessful in winning the title after Takahashi was submitted by Sanada, who would go on to win the match along with Los Ingobernables de Japón. In March, Takahashi entered the 2017 New Japan Cup, facing Juice Robinson, where he was defeated, failing to advance into the second round. In September, Takahashi would begin to feud with Beretta, who had recently announced that the Roppongi Vice tag team with partner Rocky Romero would be disbanded and the former would graduate to the heavyweight division soon. The two would face of in tag matches throughout the Destruction tour, with Takahashi emerging victorious after each match. On September 16 at Destruction in Hiroshima, Takahashi along with Bullet Club stablemate Chase Owens were defeated by Roppongi Vice in their final match together. Post-match, Takahashi took to the mic, telling Beretta to return to the junior heavyweight division, claiming that the heavyweight division was too tough for him, and challenged him to a singles match, which was accepted by Beretta. The match took place one week later at Destruction in Kobe on September 24, where Beretta defeated Takahashi, culminating their feud. From November 18 to December 11, Takahashi teamed up with Page once again for the 2017 World Tag League, where they finished third in block A with a record of four wins and three losses, failing to advance into the final. In March 2018, Takahashi entered the 2018 New Japan Cup, where he faced off against Robinson in a rematch, but was yet again defeated, failing to advance into the second round. At the World Tag League, Takahashi again teamed with Page, scoring five wins and eight losses. At the end of the tournament and in the midst of the Bullet Club Civil War, Takahashi became an official associate of The Elite. After the sub-group's departure from Bullet Club and New Japan, he and Owens, who was also kicked out, were welcomed back into BC by Tama Tonga.

At the World Tag League, Takahashi teamed with Kenta, scoring eight wins and seven losses. At Wrestle Kingdom 14, Takahashi was involved in losing efforts in an eight man tag team match on the first night and a NEVER Openweight six-man Tag Team Championship gauntlet the second night.

After missing the New Japan Cup the year before due to injury, Takahashi participated in the 2020 tournament, being eliminated by Hirooki Goto in the first round. Later that year, he would embark on a feud with Kazuchika Okada, losing to him in a singles match at Sengoku Lord. Later in the year, Takahashi took part in G1 Climax 30, the first time in five years, losing almost every match in his block, and only defeating Jeff Cobb on the last day. Takahashi teamed with Evil, in the World Tag League, where they finished with six points, failing to advance to the finals. At Wrestle Kingdom 15, Takahashi entered but failed to win the New Japan Ranbo match.

In March 2021, Takahashi entered the New Japan Cup, but was defeated by Yoshi-Hashi in the first round. In September, Takahashi took part in G1 Climax 31, finishing with five points, failing to advance to the finals. However, one of his wins was against the previous year's winner, Kota Ibushi and his match against Shingo Takagi ended in a double countout.

==== House of Torture (2021–present) ====
In September 2021, Roppongi 3K imploded after Sho attacked Yoh, following a surprising, poor run in the Super Junior Tag League. Sho accepted a Bullet Club shirt from Evil, who stood alongside Takahashi and Dick Togo, with an alternative design labeled House of Torture, officially starting a new sub-group. At Power Struggle, Takahashi, Evil and Sho, defeated Chaos to win the NEVER Openweight 6-Man Tag Team Championship. Takahashi once again teamed with Evil in the World Tag League, they finished second in the block advancing to the finals, but lost to Bishamon (Hirooki Goto and Yoshi-Hashi) in the finals. On night two of Wrestle Kingdom 15, Evil, Sho and Takahashi, retained the NEVER Openweight 6-Man Tag Team Championship against Chaos. Takahashi, entered the New Japan Cup tournament, but lost in the first round once again, to Tetsuya Naito. At Dominion 6.12 in Osaka-jo Hall, House of Torture retained the NEVER Openweight 6-Man Tag Team Championship against Suzuki-gun, but lost them to Chaos at New Japan Road. In June, Takahashi took part in G1 Climax 32, where he was placed in the D Block. He finished the tournament with six points, failing to advance to the semi-finals.

On May 3, 2025, at night one of Wrestling Dontaku, House of Torture were defeated by the Bullet Club War Dogs in a Dog Pound match. Per the stipulation, House of Torture were forced to leave Bullet Club.

== Championships and accomplishments ==
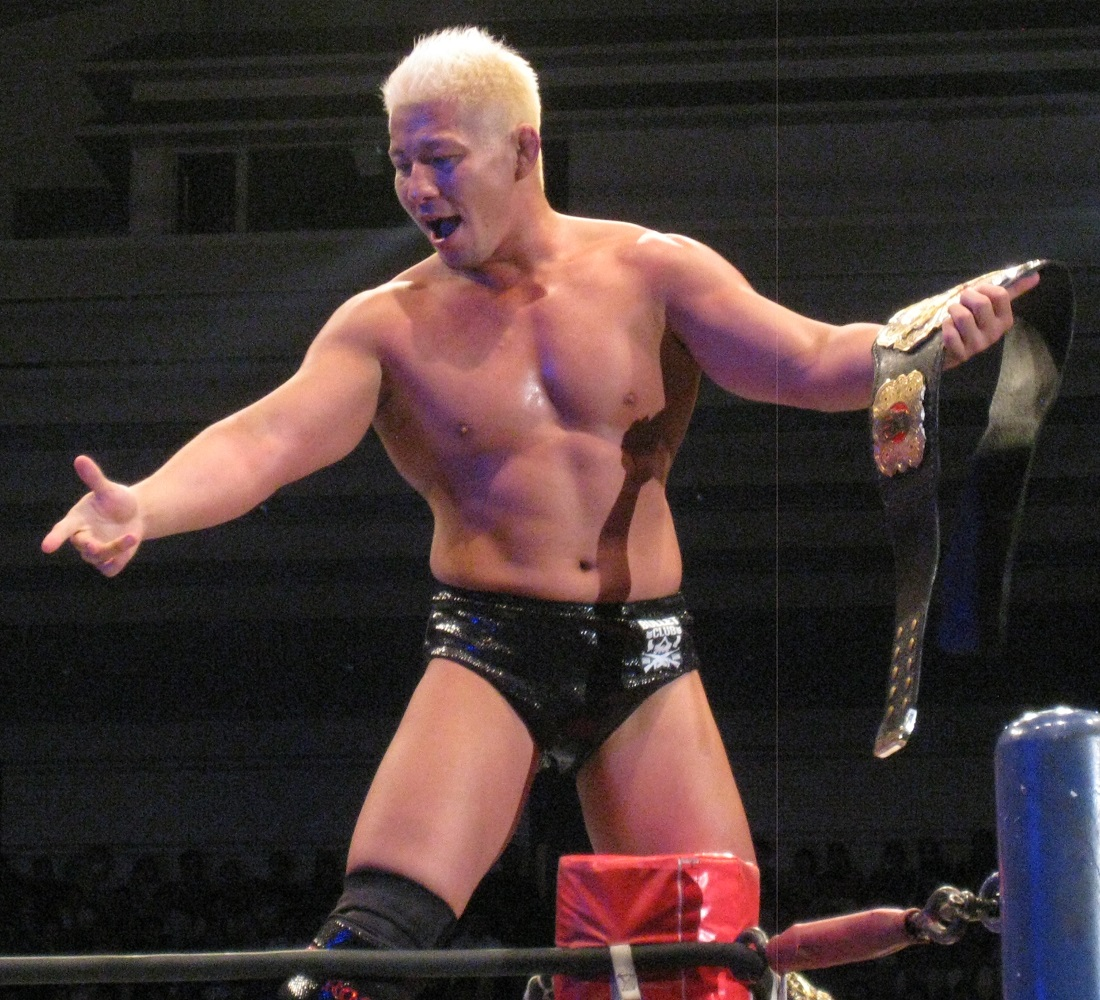
Takahashi as the NEVER Openweight Champion

- Consejo Mundial de Lucha Libre
  - Gran Alternativa (2009) – with Okumura
- New Japan Pro-Wrestling
  - NEVER Openweight Championship (1 time)
  - IWGP Tag Team Championship (1 time) – with Tetsuya Naito
  - IWGP Junior Heavyweight Tag Team Championship (1 time) – with Tetsuya Naito
  - NEVER Openweight 6-Man Tag Team Championship (4 times) – with Bad Luck Fale and Tama Tonga (1) and Evil and Sho (2) and Sho and Ren Narita (1)
- Pro Wrestling Illustrated
  - PWI ranked him #127 of the top 500 singles wrestlers in the PWI 500 in 2010

== Luchas de Apuestas record ==
Winner (wager)	Loser (wager)	Location	Event	Date	Notes
Yujiro (hair)	Black Warrior (hair)	Mexico City	Súper Viernes - El Gran Desafío	October 16, 2009	
Los Hijos del Averno (El Texano, Jr. and El Terrible) (hair)	No Limit (Yujiro and Naito) (hair)	Mexico City	Sin Salida	December 4, 2009	
