= Wrestling World 2004 =

Professional wrestling television special

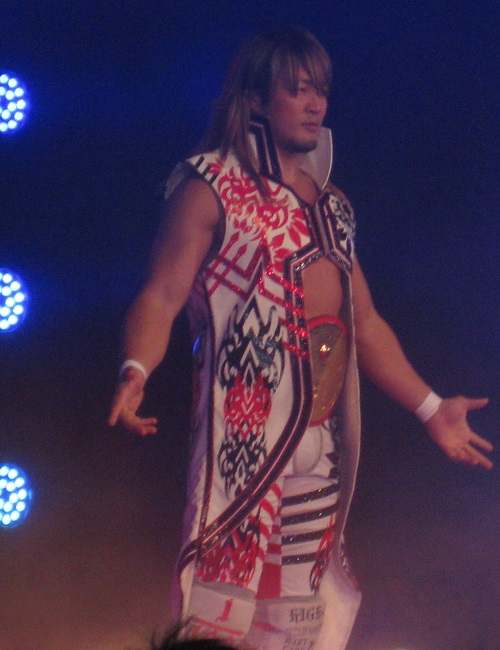
- Hiroshi Tanahashi, who successfully defended the IWGP U-30 Openweight Championship at the event.
- Promotion: New Japan Pro-Wrestling
- Date: January 4, 2004
- City: Tokyo, Japan
- Venue: Tokyo Dome
- Attendance: 40,000

Wrestling World chronology
← Previous; 2003	Next → 2005

New Japan Pro-Wrestling events chronology
← Previous; Ultimate Crush	Next → Toukon Festival: Wrestling World 2005

Wrestling World 2004 was a professional wrestling television special event produced by New Japan Pro-Wrestling (NJPW). It took place on January 4 in the Tokyo Dome. It was the thirteenth January 4 Tokyo Dome Show held by NJPW. The show drew 40,000 spectators.

The main event of the 15 match show was a unification match between IWGP Heavyweight Champion Shinsuke Nakamura and NWF Heavyweight Champion Yoshihiro Takayama. Nakamura won the match, retiring the NWF Championship after only being active for one year. The undercard saw NJPW mainstay Jushin Thunder Liger defeat Pro Wrestling Noah's Takashi Sugiura to win the GHC Junior Heavyweight Championship, marking the first time a Noah championship changed hands at a January 4 Tokyo Dome Show. Additionally Gedo and Jado successfully defended the IWGP Junior Heavyweight Tag Team Championship against Heat and Tiger Mask and Hiroshi Tanahashi retained the IWGP U-30 Openweight Championship against Yutaka Yoshie.

== Production ==
=== Background ===
The January 4 Tokyo Dome Show is NJPW's biggest annual event and has been called "the largest professional wrestling show in the world outside of the United States" and the "Japanese equivalent to the Super Bowl".

=== Storylines ===
Wrestling World 2004 featured professional wrestling matches that involved different wrestlers from pre-existing scripted feuds and storylines. Wrestlers portrayed villains, heroes, or less distinguishable characters in scripted events that built tension and culminated in a wrestling match or series of matches.

== Results ==
No.	Results	Stipulations	Times
1	Hirooki Goto defeated Naofumi Yamamoto	Singles match	06:21
2	Katsushi Takemura defeated El Samurai	Singles match	06:53
3	Makai #1, Mitsuya Nagai, Ryota Chikuzen and Ryushi Yanagisawa defeated Enson Inoue, Hiro Saito, Michiyoshi Ohara and Tatsutoshi Goto	Eight-man tag team match	11:55
4	Shinya Makabe and Toru Yano defeated Blue Wolf and Wataru Inoue	Tag team match	10:18
5	Masayuki Naruse defeated Tadao Yasuda via disqualification (2:09), match restarted: Naruse won via stoppage	Singles match	02:30
6	Ryusuke Taguchi defeated Akiya Anzawa	Singles match	04:53
7	Gedo and Jado (c) defeated Heat and Tiger Mask	Tag team match for the IWGP Junior Heavyweight Tag Team Championship	17:15
8	Jushin Thunder Liger defeated Takashi Sugiura (c)	Singles match for the GHC Junior Heavyweight Championship	17:52
9	Hiroshi Tanahashi (c) defeated Yutaka Yoshie	Singles match for the IWGP U-30 Openweight Championship	17:06
10	Josh Barnett and Takashi Iizuka defeated Katsuyori Shibata and Kazunari Murakami	Tag team match	16:04
11	Osamu Nishimura defeated Minoru Suzuki	Singles match	09:39
12	Manabu Nakanishi defeated Genichiro Tenryu	Singles match	10:20
13	Yuji Nagata defeated Kensuke Sasaki via referee stoppage	Singles match	12:10
14	Bob Sapp and Keiji Mutoh defeated Cho-Ten (Hiroyoshi Tenzan and Masahiro Chono)	Tag team match	21:00
15	Shinsuke Nakamura (IWGP) defeated Yoshihiro Takayama (NWF)	Singles match for both the IWGP Heavyweight Championship and NWF Heavyweight Championship	13:55
(c) / – the champion(s) heading into the match
