= Toukon Shidou Chapter 1 =

Wrestling television special

- Promotional poster featuring various NJPW wrestlers
- Promotion: New Japan Pro-Wrestling
- Date: January 4, 2006
- City: Tokyo, Japan
- Venue: Tokyo Dome
- Attendance: 31,000

January 4 Tokyo Dome Show chronology
← Previous; Toukon Festival: Wrestling World 2005	Next → Wrestle Kingdom in Tokyo Dome

New Japan Pro-Wrestling events chronology
← Previous; Toukon Festival: Wrestling World 2005	Next → Wrestle Kingdom in Tokyo Dome

Toukon Shidou Chapter 1 (闘魂始動 ~ CHAPTER1 ~; "Fighting Spirit Starting ~ CHAPTER1 ~") was a professional wrestling television special event produced by New Japan Pro-Wrestling (NJPW). It took place on January 4 in the Tokyo Dome. It was the fifteenth January 4 Tokyo Dome Show held by NJPW. The show drew 31,000 spectators.

The main focus of the 11 match show was the IWGP championship defenses in the semi-main event and the main event. In the semi-main event Masahiro Chono and Hiroyoshi Tenzan successfully defended the IWGP Tag Team Championship against Shiro Koshinaka and Takao Omori; while the main event featured Brock Lesnar retaining the IWGP Heavyweight Championship against Shinsuke Nakamura. For only the second time in the history of the January 4 Tokyo Dome Shows, no title changed hands.

== Production ==
=== Background ===
The January 4 Tokyo Dome Show is NJPW's biggest annual event and has been called "the largest professional wrestling show in the world outside of the United States" and the "Japanese equivalent to the Super Bowl".

=== Storylines ===
Toukon Shidou Chapter 1 featured professional wrestling matches that involved different wrestlers from pre-existing scripted feuds and storylines. Wrestlers portrayed villains, heroes, or less distinguishable characters in scripted events that built tension and culminated in a wrestling match or series of matches.

== Results ==
No.	Results	Stipulations	Times
1	Ryouji Sai defeated Naofumi Yamamoto	Singles match	08:18
2	Badboy Hido, Kintaro Kanemura and Masato Tanaka defeated Gedo, Jado and Jushin Thunder Liger	Six-man tag team match	10:03
3	Minoru and Tiger Mask defeated Tatsuhito Takaiwa and Tomohiro Ishii	Tag team match	12:11
4	Daisuke Sekimoto, Kamikaze, Kohei Sato, Riki Choshu, Takashi Uwano and Yoshihito Sasaki defeated Hirooki Goto, Hiroshi Nagao, Osamu Nishimura, Takashi Iizuka, Tatsumi Fujinami and Toru Yano	Twelve-man tag team match	12:16
5	Akebono and Yutaka Yoshie defeated Black Strong Machine and Hiro Saito	Tag team match	09:18
6	Yuji Nagata defeated Kazunari Murakami	Singles match	13:11
7	Shinjiro Otani defeated Koji Kanemoto	Singles match	10:47
8	Katsuyori Shibata defeated Hiroshi Tanahashi	Singles match	11:59
9	Giant Bernard defeated Manabu Nakanishi	Singles match	09:53
10	Masahiro Chono and Hiroyoshi Tenzan (c) defeated Shiro Koshinaka and Takao Omori	Tag team match for the IWGP Tag Team Championship	19:28
11	Brock Lesnar (c) defeated Shinsuke Nakamura	Singles match for the IWGP Heavyweight Championship	08:58
(c) / – the champion(s) heading into the match
