= Toukon Festival: Wrestling World 2005 =

2005 New Japan Pro-Wrestling event

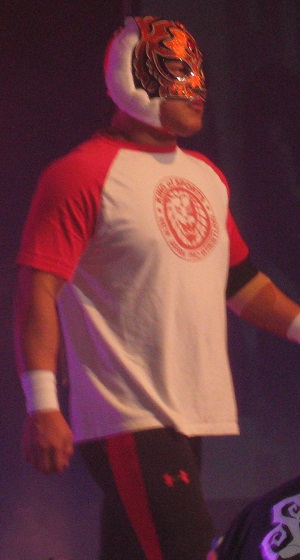
- Tiger Mask, who won the IWGP Junior Heavyweight Championship at the event.
- Promotion: New Japan Pro-Wrestling
- Date: January 4, 2005
- City: Tokyo, Japan
- Venue: Tokyo Dome
- Attendance: 46,000 (official); 36,000 (claimed)

Pay-per-view chronology
← Previous; Wrestling World 2004	Next → Toukon Shidou Chapter 1

January 4 Tokyo Dome Show chronology
← Previous; Wrestling World	Next → Toukon Shidou Chapter 1

Toukon Festival: Wrestling World 2005 (Japanese: 闘魂祭り～WRESTLING WORLD 2005, Hepburn: Tōkon Matsuri: Wrestling World 2005) was a professional wrestling television special event produced by New Japan Pro-Wrestling. It took place on January 4 in the Tokyo Dome. Toukon Festival: It was the fourteenth January 4 Tokyo Dome Show held by NJPW. Officially, the show drew 46,000 spectators.

The undercard of the show featured an eight-man "submissions only" tournament which Ron Waterman won when he forced Yuji Nagata to submit in the finals. The show also saw Tiger Mask defeat Heat to win the IWGP Junior Heavyweight Championship and in the main event Shinsuke Nakamura defeated Hiroshi Tanahashi to win the IWGP U-30 Openweight Championship. The show also featured a unique "Dog Fight" match between Masahiro Chono, Riki Choshu and Hiroyoshi Tenzan. Chono defeated Chosu in the first match and as a result had to wrestle Tenzan in the next match.

== Production ==
=== Background ===
As New Japan Pro Wrestling's January 4 Tokyo Dome event for that year, Toukon Festival: Wrestling World 2005 was a precursor to Wrestle Kingdom, which is NJPW's biggest annual event and has been called "the largest professional wrestling show in the world outside of the United States" and the "Japanese equivalent to the Super Bowl".

=== Storylines ===
Wrestling World 2005 in Tokyo Dome featured professional wrestling matches that involved different wrestlers from pre-existing scripted feuds and storylines. Wrestlers portrayed villains, heroes, or less distinguishable characters in scripted events that built tension and culminated in a wrestling match or series of matches.

== Results ==
No.	Results	Stipulations	Times
1	Jado and Gedo vs. Katsushi Takemura and Wataru Inoue ended in a time limit draw	Tag team match	15:00
2	Jushin Thunder Liger defeated Koji Kanemoto	Singles match to determine the No. 1 contender to the IWGP Junior Heavyweight Championship	10:30
3	Tiger Mask defeated Heat (c)	Singles match for the IWGP Junior Heavyweight Championship	14:17
4	Yuji Nagata defeated Katsuhiko Nagata by points 15–11	Amateur wrestling-style exhibition match	5:00
5	Minoru Suzuki defeated Takashi Iizuka	Singles match	9:45
6	Satoshi Kojima defeated Osamu Nishimura	Singles match	19:26
7	Ron Waterman defeated Masayuki Naruse via referee stoppage	Ultimate Royal quarterfinal	2:35
8	Manabu Nakanishi defeated Toru Yano	Ultimate Royal quarterfinal	3:09
9	Dolgorsuren Sumiyabazar defeated Mitsuya Nagai	Ultimate Royal quarterfinal	5:46
10	Yuji Nagata defeated Blue Wolf	Ultimate Royal quarterfinal	5:49
11	Ron Waterman defeated Manabu Nakanishi	Ultimate Royal semifinal	1:02
12	Yuji Nagata defeated Dolgorsuren Sumiyabazar via referee stoppage	Ultimate Royal semifinal	1:53
13	Ron Waterman defeated Yuji Nagata	Ultimate Royal final	1:41
14	Masahiro Chono defeated Riki Choshu and Hiroyoshi Tenzan	Toukon Cup tomoesen	18:27
15	Shinsuke Nakamura defeated Hiroshi Tanahashi (c)	Singles match for the IWGP U-30 Openweight Championship	24:45
(c) / – the champion(s) heading into the match

=== Ultimate Royal bracket ===
The Ultimate Royal was an eight-man single-elimination tournament billed as an "Ultimate Crush rules battle royal". Matches were fought under Ultimate Crush rules, akin to mixed martial arts rules.

Quarterfinals
Masayuki Naruse	TKO
Ron Waterman	2:35
Manabu Nakanishi	Sub
Toru Yano	3:09
Mitsuya Nagai	Sub
Dolgorsuren Sumiyabazar	5:46
Blue Wolf	Sub
Yuji Nagata	5:49

Semifinals
Ron Waterman	Sub
Manabu Nakanishi	1:02
Dolgorsuren Sumiyabazar	TKO
Yuji Nagata	1:53

Final
Ron Waterman	Sub
Yuji Nagata	1:41

=== Toukon Cup tomoesen ===
The Toukon Cup tomoesen was a three-way match disputed in several one-on-one falls, similarly to a tomoesen in sumo wrestling.

Toukon Cup tomoesen results
Fall	Winner	Loser	Method	Times
1	Masahiro Chono	Riki Choshu	Pinfall	6:54
2	Masahiro Chono	Hiroyoshi Tenzan	Submission	11:33
