= IWGP U-30 Openweight Championship =

Professional wrestling championship

Details
- Promotion: New Japan Pro-Wrestling
- Date established: April 23, 2003
- Date retired: June 7, 2006

Other names
- U-30 Openweight Championship (2003–2004)
Statistics
- First champion: Hiroshi Tanahashi
- Final champion: Hiroshi Tanahashi
- Most reigns: Hiroshi Tanahashi (2 reigns)
- Longest reign: Hiroshi Tanahashi (First reign, 622 days)
- Shortest reign: Shinsuke Nakamura (117 days)
- Oldest champion: Hiroshi Tanahashi (28 years, 8 months and 5 days)
- Youngest champion: Shinsuke Nakamura (24 years, 10 months and 11 days)

The IWGP U-30 Openweight Championship (IWGP U-30無差別級王座, IWGP Andā Sātī Musabetsu-kyū Ōza) was a professional wrestling openweight championship in New Japan Pro-Wrestling for younger wrestlers who were under the age of 30. It was proposed as part of a tournament called the G2 U-30 Climax by Hiroshi Tanahashi, who ended up winning the tournament in April 2003. The U-30 Openweight Championship became officially recognized as an IWGP title in November 2004.

Only two champions between three reigns were ever crowned over its three-year existence, the inaugural and two-time champion Hiroshi Tanahashi, and Shinsuke Nakamura.

As his 30th birthday began to approach (which would then make him ineligible to be the champion), Tanahashi vacated the title on June 7, 2006, to focus on the IWGP Heavyweight Championship, and soon afterwards the U-30 Openweight Championship was de-emphasized and soon deactivated.

== Title history ==
Key
No.	Overall reign number
Reign	Reign number for the specific champion
Days	Number of days held
Defenses	Number of successful defenses

No.	Champion	Championship change			Reign statistics			Notes	Ref.
No.	Champion	Date	Event	Location	Reign	Days	Defenses	Notes	Ref.
New Japan Pro Wrestling (NJPW)
1	Hiroshi Tanahashi	April 23, 2003	Strong Energy 2003	Hiroshima, Japan	1	622	11	Defeated Shinya Makabe (who ironically was already 30 years old) in the finals of the G2 U-30 Climax tournament to become inaugural champion at the age of 26.	
2	Shinsuke Nakamura	January 4, 2005	Toukon Festival: Wrestling World 2005	Tokyo, Japan	1	117	0	Defeated the champion Hiroshi Tanahashi in the main event of the Tokyo Dome Show to win the championship at the age of 24.	
—	Vacated	May 1, 2005	—	—	—	—	—	Nakamura vacated the championship by company request due to not defending it.	
3	Hiroshi Tanahashi	June 18, 2005	Best of the Super Jr. XII	Kyoto, Japan	2	354	2	Defeated Toru Yano in the finals of a six-man round-robin tournament for the vacated title at the age of 28.	
—	Deactivated	June 7, 2006	—	—	—	—	—	Vacated by Tanahashi at the age of 29 to focus on the IWGP Heavyweight Championship.	

== Combined reigns ==
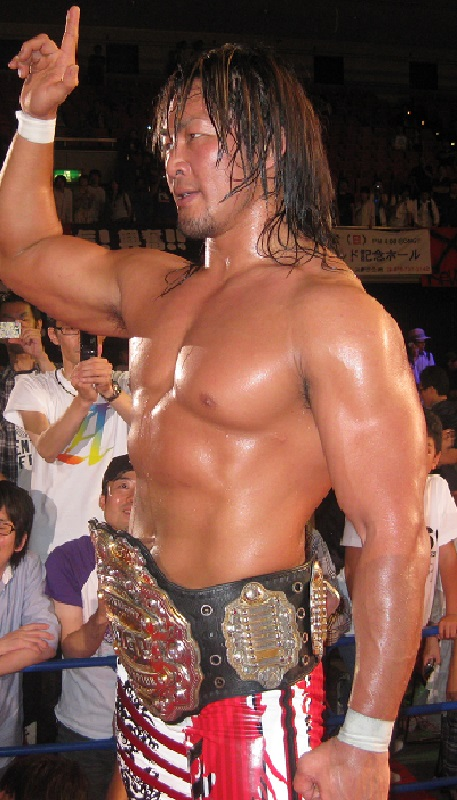
Hiroshi Tanahashi held the IWGP U-30 Openweight Championship twice

Rank	Wrestler	No. of reigns	Combined defenses	Combined days
1	Hiroshi Tanahashi	2	13	976
2	Shinsuke Nakamura	1	0	117

== See also ==
- NEVER Openweight Championship
- O-40 Championship
