= Hiroshi Tanahashi =

President of NJPW, former wrestler (born 1976)

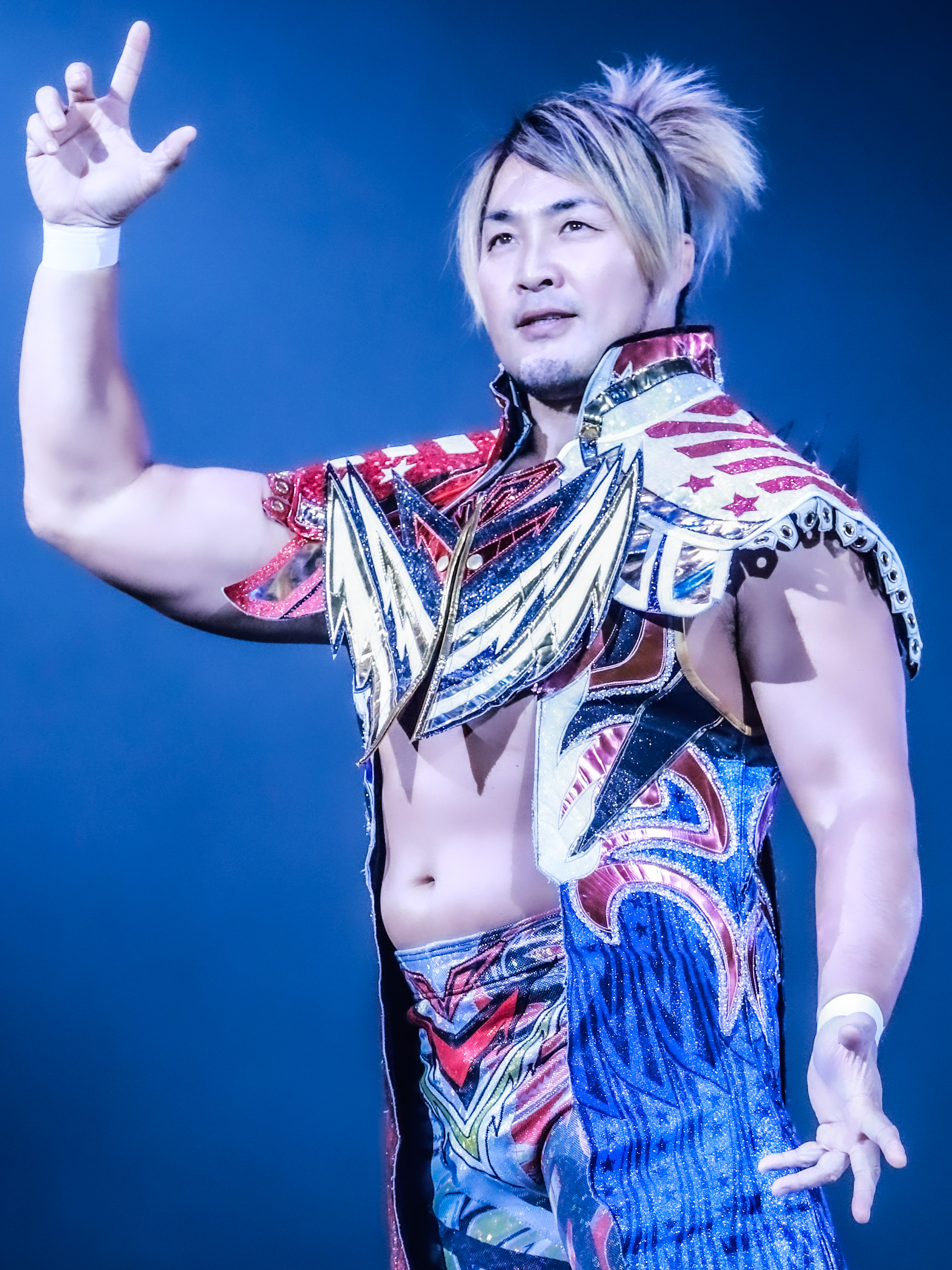
- Tanahashi in 2022

Personal information
- Born: November 13, 1976 (age 50) Ōgaki, Gifu, Japan
- Education: Ritsumeikan University
- Children: 2

Professional wrestling career
- Ring name(s): Hiroshi Tanahashi; Masked Devilock; Super Strong Machine Ace; Tanahashi; Gokiburi Mask; Wrestle Lando
- Billed height: 1.81 m (5 ft 11 in)
- Billed weight: 101 kg (223 lb)
- Billed from: Ōgaki, Gifu, Japan
- Trained by: Keiji Muto; Kensuke Sasaki; Kotetsu Yamamoto; NJPW Dojo; Tatsumi Fujinami
- Debut: October 10, 1999
- Retired: January 4, 2026

Japanese name
- Kanji: 棚橋 弘至
- Hiragana: たなはし ひろし
- Katakana: タナハシ・ヒロシ
Transcriptions
- Romanization: Tanahashi Hiroshi

Hiroshi Tanahashi (棚橋弘至, Tanahashi Hiroshi; born November 13, 1976) is a Japanese sports executive, podcaster and retired professional wrestler. He is signed to New Japan Pro-Wrestling (NJPW), where he serves as the president and representative director, whilst also wrestling for them from 1999 until 2026.

Hiroshi Tanahashi has held 26 championships in New Japan Pro-Wrestling (NJPW), including a record eight reigns as IWGP Heavyweight Champion and three as IWGP United States Heavyweight Champion. His other titles include two IWGP Intercontinental Championships, one NJPW World Television Championship, three IWGP Tag Team Championships, one NEVER Openweight Championship, six NEVER Openweight 6-Man Tag Team Championships, and two IWGP U-30 Openweight Championships.

Tanahashi won the G1 Climax tournament three times, in 2007, 2015, and 2018, and the New Japan Cup twice, in 2005 and 2008. He was also the fourth wrestler to complete NJPW's Triple Crown and the second to achieve its Grand Slam.

Through NJPW's working agreements with Consejo Mundial de Lucha Libre (CMLL), Pro Wrestling NOAH, Ring of Honor (ROH), All Elite Wrestling (AEW) and Revolution Pro Wrestling, Tanahashi has also held the CMLL World Tag Team Championship, the CMLL World Trios Championship, the CMLL Universal Championship, GHC Tag Team Championship, and the RevPro British Heavyweight Championship. Between NJPW, CMLL, Noah, ROH and RevPro, he has 27 championship reigns.

When Tanahashi was inducted into the Wrestling Observer Hall of Fame in 2013, Dave Meltzer stated that "you could make a strong case for him as the best in-ring performer in the business today", adding that he was "the leading star in New Japan Pro-Wrestling's comeback from being in terrible shape a few years back to being the No. 2 pro wrestling company in the world". Readers of the Wrestling Observer Newsletter named Tanahashi as the best wrestler of the 2010s in March 2020.

== Early life ==
Before entering professional wrestling, Tanahashi was a baseball player in high school. He studied law at Ritsumeikan University in Kyoto, where he began practicing freestyle wrestling. During this time, he was noticed by New Japan Pro-Wrestling (NJPW) talent scouts and was invited to try out for the NJPW Dojo. His February 1998 tryout was successful and he was accepted as a trainee. He enrolled in the NJPW dojo after graduating from Ritsumeikan University the following year. Tanahashi has cited Shawn Michaels as his favorite wrestler. He also admired Tatsumi Fujinami, and considered using the ring name "Dragon Hiroshi" in honor of him.

== Professional wrestling career ==
=== New Japan Pro-Wrestling (1999–present) ===
==== Early years (1999–2003) ====
After graduating from the NJPW Dojo, Tanahashi made his debut on October 10, 1999, in a match losing to Shinya Makabe. Alongside fellow rookies Katsuyori Shibata and Shinsuke Nakamura, Tanahashi became known as one of the "new Three Musketeers". He became viewed as a big prospect and was given big wins over lucha libre legend Negro Casas in July 2000 and American Scott Hall in September 2001. His star continued to rise and in the 2002 G1 Climax (one of NJPW's most important annual tournaments) Tanahashi pinned Kensuke Sasaki in under two minutes.

After this, Tanahashi was paired with Kenzo Suzuki in a tag team named the Kings of the Hills. This pairing was popular, but came to an end after a real life incident in November 2002 in which Tanahashi was stabbed in the back by Hitomi Hara, a TV Asahi news reporter. Tanahashi and Hara had dated one another, but in a meeting at her Tokyo apartment he tried to break off the relationship as he had started dating another woman, which led to Hara stabbing him twice. Hara later confessed she tried to kill Tanahashi and planned to commit suicide afterwards. Hara was charged with attempted murder and sentenced to four years on probation. On February 16, 2003, Tanahashi returned as a singles wrestler to a sold-out crowd in Tokyo in a match against Manabu Nakanishi.

==== Rise to Stardom (2003–2010) ====
His career began to rapidly climb from this point. In the later half of 2003 Tanahashi captured the IWGP U-30 Openweight Championship and the IWGP Tag Team Championship, the latter on two separate occasions. In August 2004 he made it to the finals of the G1 Climax and on January 4, 2005, he headlined the Toukon Festival: Wrestling World 2005 show in Tokyo Dome in a match, where he dropped the U-30 Openweight Championship to Shinsuke Nakamura. In 2005, Tanahashi also made an appearance in the 15th Sasuke competition on July 20. He was eliminated in the first round. On June 18, Tanahashi defeated Toru Yano in a tournament final to regain the U-30 Openweight Championship. He would go on to defeat Masahiro Chono by Sling Blade in the first round of the New Japan Cup (determining a No. 1 contender against IWGP Heavyweight Champion Brock Lesnar) on April 16, 2006, in Korakuen Hall and Hiroyoshi Tenzan by Dragon suplex hold in the second round on April 25 in Omuta Citizen Gymnasium before falling to Yuji Nagata's wrist-clutch Exploder in the semifinal on April 29 in the Tottori Industrial Gymnasium. He also defeated Tiger Mask on May 13 in the first ever main event of the new Wrestle Land brand (a promotional experiment by New Japan with "sports entertainment"), debuting a modified side buster finish. On June 7, Tanahashi vacated the U-30 Openweight Championship in order to fully focus on his upcoming match against Brock Lesnar for the IWGP Heavyweight Championship.

When Lesnar failed to show up for the match, he was stripped of the title and Tanahashi was placed in a tournament for the vacant title. On July 17, Tanahashi won his first IWGP Heavyweight Championship when he defeated Giant Bernard in the finals of the tournament for the vacant title. He showed the title belt on his second appearance on Sasuke during the 17th competition, where he was again eliminated in the first round. After holding the title belt for almost 9 months (270 days) and defending the title against the likes of Taiyō Kea, Shinsuke Nakamura and others, Tanahashi lost the title to Yuji Nagata, who had won the 2007 New Japan Cup to become the No. 1 contender. Tanahashi managed to come back from this by winning the 2007 G1 Climax, where he defeated Nagata in the finals and successfully challenged his rival to a rematch on October 8, 2007, where he pinned Nagata to regain the title. On January 4, 2008, at New Japan's annual Tokyo Dome show titled Wrestle Kingdom II in Tokyo Dome, Tanahashi was defeated by Shinsuke Nakamura for the IWGP Heavyweight title in the night's main event. In February's New Japan Ism tour, Tanahashi successfully defeated A.J. Styles in a highly anticipated rematch of their 2006 bout in Total Nonstop Action Wrestling (TNA). Following this, Tanahashi was entered into the coveted New Japan Cup tournament in which the winner would face off against the then-IWGP Heavyweight Champion Shinsuke Nakamura as the number one contender. With a win over Giant Bernard, Tanahashi became the first two-time winner of the New Japan Cup.

After New Japan Cup, competed in the All Japan Pro Wrestling's Champion Carnival. He came in as a villain and was given the "Block from Hell" as he had to face nearly all of All Japan's top talent including Taiyō Kea, Satoshi Kojima, Toshiaki Kawada and his mentor Keiji Muto. He went undefeated and advanced to the finals where he was finally subdued by Suwama.

On January 4 at Wrestle Kingdom III in Tokyo Dome, Tanahashi defeated Muto to become the 50th IWGP Heavyweight Champion, beginning his third reign. Following his victory, when asked who he would like his next challenger to be, Tanahashi called out generation rival Shinsuke Nakamura, who accepted. At New Japan's ISM tour on February 15, Tanahashi defeated Nakamura with the High Fly Flow in his first title defense. Tanahashi defeated Kurt Angle on April 5 at New Japan's "Resolution 09" with two High Fly Flows. His next opponent was Hirooki Goto, whom he defeated on May 3 at Wrestling Dontaku 2009 with a High Fly Flow. Just days later, Tanahashi was defeated by Manabu Nakanishi on May 6 at "Dissidence 2009". He regained the Title from Nakanishi on June 20 at Dominion 6.20 for his fourth reign. He successfully defended the title against Pro Wrestling Noah's Takashi Sugiura on July 20, the first ever NJPW vs. Noah match for the IWGP Heavyweight title. During a post-match interview, Tanahashi was interrupted by Tajiri, who then sprayed Tanahashi with Green Mist. Tanahashi would vacate the IWGP Heavyweight title on August 17, due to an eye fracture injury he suffered in a match with Shinsuke Nakamura, in the semi-finals of the 2009 G1 Climax Tournament. On November 8 at Destruction '09 Tanahashi returned to challenge for the belt he was forced to vacate, but came up short against the reigning champion Nakamura. On December 5 Tanahashi would avenge the loss he suffered during the G1 Climax Tournament and end his feud with Tajiri by pinning him in a singles match with the High Fly Flow. Afterwards, Tanahashi made a challenge to Pro Wrestling Noah and on January 4, 2010, at Wrestle Kingdom IV in Tokyo Dome he defeated Noah's Go Shiozaki in a match that was billed as "Ace vs. Ace". Since then, Tanahashi would begin a feud with Toru Yano, starting with Yano upsetting Tanahashi in a tag team match on January 30, where he teamed with Manabu Nakanishi and Yano with Shinsuke Nakamura. On February 14, Tanahashi avenged his loss in a singles match with Yano, but was jumped after the match by Masato Tanaka, after which Yano proceeded to cut off some of his hair. After Yano defeated Tanahashi in a singles match at Wrestling Dontaku 2010, New Japan booked the two men in a Hair vs. Hair match for June 19. On June 19 at Dominion 6.19, Tanahashi defeated Yano and was afterwards assisted by former rival Tajiri and Kushida in taking care of Yano's ally Takashi Iizuka and shave his opponent's hair. In August, Tanahashi entered the 2010 G1 Climax tournament and made it all the way to the finals, after four wins and a draw in the round robin stage of the tournament. However, in the finals Tanahashi was defeated by freelancer Satoshi Kojima. In October and November 2010, Tanahashi teamed with Tajiri in New Japan's 2010 G1 Tag League. After a strong start in the tournament, Tanahashi and Tajiri were defeated by the IWGP Tag Team Champions Bad Intentions (Giant Bernard and Karl Anderson) on November 6, the last day of group stages, and slipped to third place in their block, narrowly missing the semifinals of the tournament.

==== Record-breaking IWGP Heavyweight Champion (2010–2014) ====
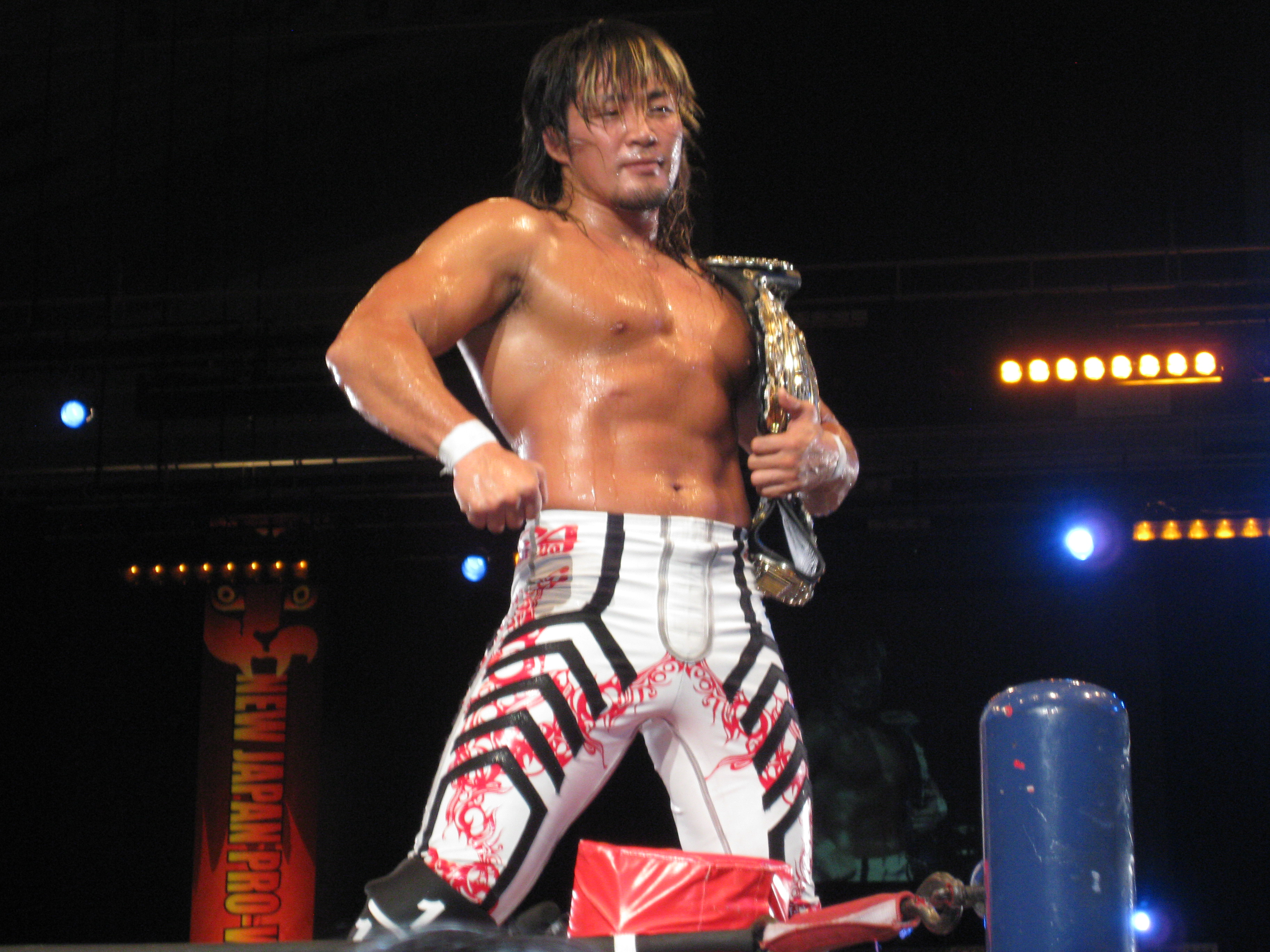
Tanahashi during his fifth IWGP Heavyweight Championship reign in August 2011

After scoring back-to-back pinfall victories over top contender Hirooki Goto and Tetsuya Naito on December 11 and 12, Tanahashi was granted a shot at the IWGP Heavyweight Champion Satoshi Kojima at Wrestle Kingdom V in Tokyo Dome. At the event on January 4, 2011, Tanahashi defeated Kojima to win the IWGP Heavyweight Championship for the fifth time. On February 20 at The New Beginning, Tanahashi made his first successful defense of the title, defeating Kojima in a rematch. Tanahashi went on to successfully defend the title against New Japan Cup winner Yuji Nagata on April 3 and Shinsuke Nakamura on May 3. In May 2011, Tanahashi took part in the Invasion Tour 2011, New Japan's first ever tour of the United States, during which he successfully defended the IWGP Heavyweight Championship against Charlie Haas on May 14 in New York City.

After another title defense on June 18 against rival Hirooki Goto, Tanahashi was challenged by IWGP Tag Team Champion Giant Bernard, but he answered this with a challenge of his own, suggesting a match for the IWGP Tag Team Championship between Bad Intentions and himself and Goto. On July 3, Tanahashi and Goto failed in their attempt to capture the IWGP Tag Team Championship from Bad Intentions. On July 18, Tanahashi made his sixth successful defense of the IWGP Heavyweight Championship against Giant Bernard. In the following month's 2011 G1 Climax, Tanahashi led his block for the majority of the tournament, but an upset loss on the final day of the tournament against Tetsuya Naito, caused him to narrowly miss advancing to the finals. On September 19, Tanahashi made his seventh successful IWGP Heavyweight Championship defense against G1 Climax winner Shinsuke Nakamura, despite losing a tooth during the match. On October 10 at Destruction '11, Tanahashi avenged his loss from the final day of the 2011 G1 Climax by defeating Tetsuya Naito to make his eighth successful IWGP Heavyweight Championship defense. With Tanahashi now edging closer to Yuji Nagata's record of ten successful defenses, Nagata came out after the match to challenge him for the title. However, after Tanahashi had accepted the challenge, he was attacked by Toru Yano, who proceeded to steal his championship belt. In the 2011 G1 Tag League, Tanahashi teamed with Hirooki Goto as "The Billion Powers". After picking up two wins and two losses in their first four matches in the group stage of the tournament, Tanahashi and Goto defeated the Beast Combination (Satoshi Kojima and Togi Makabe) on November 4 to advance to the semifinals of the tournament. On November 6, Tanahashi and Goto were eliminated from the tournament in the semifinals by Bad Intentions. On November 12 at Power Struggle, Tanahashi regained the IWGP Heavyweight Championship belt from Toru Yano by successfully defending the title against him, after which he was again challenged by Yuji Nagata. On December 4, Tanahashi defeated Nagata to make his tenth successful IWGP Heavyweight Championship defense, tying Nagata's record in the process. On January 4, 2012, at Wrestle Kingdom VI in Tokyo Dome, Tanahashi broke the record by successfully defending the title against Minoru Suzuki. On February 12 at The New Beginning, Tanahashi lost the IWGP Heavyweight Championship to Kazuchika Okada, ending his reign at 404 days.

On June 16 at Dominion 6.16, Tanahashi defeated Okada in a rematch to win the IWGP Heavyweight Championship for the sixth time, tying Tatsumi Fujinami's record for most reigns with the title. Tanahashi made his first title defense on July 1, defeating Togi Makabe at an event co-promoted by New Japan and All Japan. All reigns combined, this was Tanahashi's twenty-first successful defense of the IWGP Heavyweight Championship, which was another New Japan record. Tanahashi made his second successful title defense on July 22 against Masato Tanaka. The following month, Tanahashi took part in the 2012 G1 Climax tournament, where he won five out of his first seven matches, but a loss to Karl Anderson on the final day of the tournament caused him to narrowly miss advancing to the finals. On September 23 at Destruction, Tanahashi successfully defended the IWGP Heavyweight Championship against Pro Wrestling Noah's Naomichi Marufuji, avenging a loss suffered during the 2012 G1 Climax. On October 8 at King of Pro-Wrestling, Tanahashi defeated Minoru Suzuki for the fourth successful defense of his sixth IWGP Heavyweight Championship reign. The match received rave reviews. On November 11 at Power Struggle, Tanahashi made his fifth successful title defense against Yujiro Takahashi. Later in the month, Tanahashi took part in the 2012 World Tag League, teaming with Captain New Japan under the team name "Captain Ace". The team lost all six of their matches with Captain New Japan being pinned in each match. On January 4, 2013, at Wrestle Kingdom 7 in Tokyo Dome, Tanahashi made his sixth successful defense of the IWGP Heavyweight Championship against the previous year's G1 Climax winner, Kazuchika Okada. At the following pay-per-view, The New Beginning on February 10, Tanahashi made another successful title defense against Karl Anderson, avenging his loss from the 2012 G1 Climax. On March 3 at New Japan's 41st anniversary event, Tanahashi defeated IWGP Junior Heavyweight Champion Prince Devitt in a special non-title main event. On April 7 at Invasion Attack, Tanahashi lost the IWGP Heavyweight Championship back to Kazuchika Okada. On June 22 at Dominion 6.22, Tanahashi attempted to earn another shot at the title, but was defeated in a number one contender's match by Prince Devitt, following interference from Devitt's new Bullet Club stable. On July 5, Tanahashi teamed with Jushin Thunder Liger to defeat Bullet Club member Tama Tonga and El Terrible for the CMLL World Tag Team Championship. From August 1 to 11, Tanahashi took part in the 2013 G1 Climax, where he opened by losing three of his first four matches. However, Tanahashi bounced back to wrestle IWGP Heavyweight Champion Kazuchika Okada to a time limit draw and winning his other four matches to win his block and advance to the finals of the tournament. In the finals on August 11, Tanahashi was defeated by Tetsuya Naito. After returning from a tour of CMLL, Tanahashi and Liger lost the CMLL World Tag Team Championship on September 14 to Bullet Club members Rey Bucanero and Tama Tonga, following outside interference from the rest of the group. Tanahashi's rivalry with Bullet Club leader Prince Devitt built to a Lumberjack Deathmatch on September 29 at Destruction, where Tanahashi was victorious. With the Devitt rivalry behind him, Tanahashi once again set his sights on the IWGP Heavyweight Championship, challenging Kazuchika Okada at the end of the event. Tanahashi failed in his title challenge on October 14 at King of Pro-Wrestling. In a post-match interview, Tanahashi bid farewell to the IWGP Heavyweight Championship as he had proclaimed that he would not challenge for the title again, should he lose to Okada. Tanahashi then entered the IWGP Intercontinental Championship picture, after being nominated as the next challenger by champion Shinsuke Nakamura, setting up the first title match between the two longtime rivals in over two years. In November, Captain Ace reunited for the 2013 World Tag League. Much like the previous year, the team lost their first five matches, but on the final day they finally picked up a win over Bad Luck Fale and Prince Devitt, costing the Bullet Club team a spot in the semifinals.

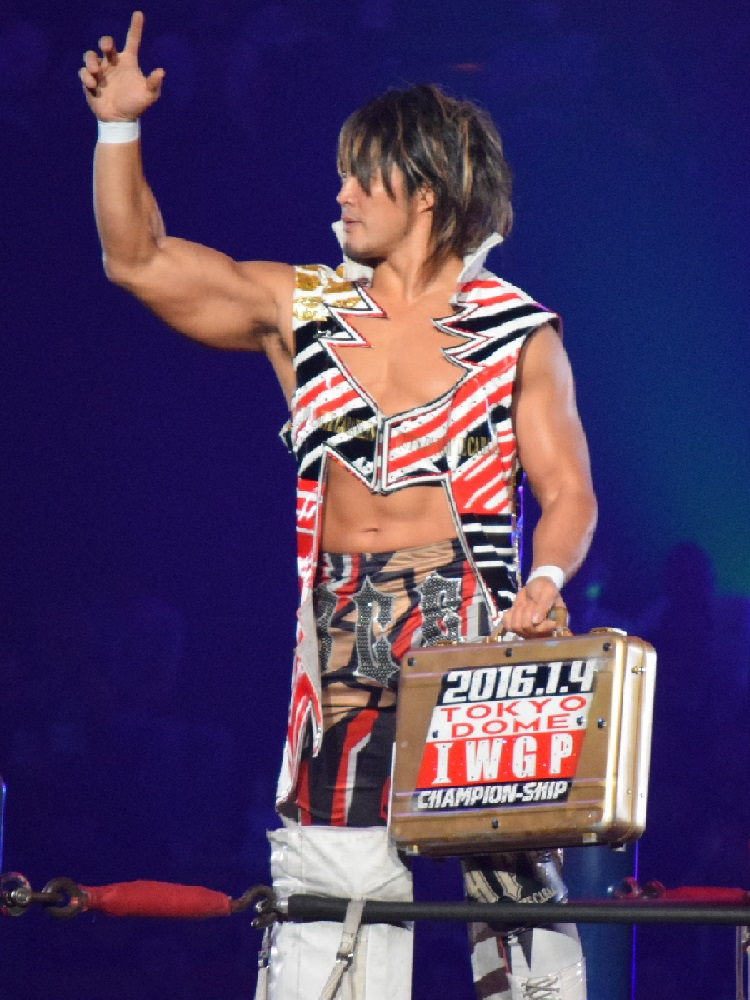
Tanahashi in November 2015 with a briefcase containing the Wrestle Kingdom 10 IWGP Heavyweight Championship match contract

On January 4, 2014, Tanahashi defeated Nakamura in the main event of Wrestle Kingdom 8 in Tokyo Dome to win the IWGP Intercontinental Championship for the first time. A rematch between the two took place on February 9 at The New Beginning in Hiroshima and saw Tanahashi make his first successful title defense. After Nakamura had won the 2014 New Japan Cup, another title match was booked between him and Tanahashi for the April 6 Invasion Attack 2014 event, where Tanahashi was defeated in his second title defense. Afterwards, Tanahashi formed a tag team named "Ace to King" (Japanese for "Ace and King") with Togi Makabe to after the IWGP Tag Team Championship. In May, Tanahashi took part in NJPW's North American tour, defeating Ring of Honor's Michael Bennett in an interpromotional match at War of the Worlds on May 17. On May 25 at Back to the Yokohama Arena, Tanahashi and Makabe defeated Hirooki Goto and Katsuyori Shibata to earn a shot at the IWGP Tag Team Championship. Tanahashi and Makabe received their title shot on June 21 at Dominion 6.21, but were defeated by Bullet Club's Doc Gallows and Karl Anderson. In the 2014 G1 Climax, Tanahashi finished with a record of seven wins and three losses, with a loss against Davey Boy Smith Jr. on the final day costing him a spot in the finals. After defeating Katsuyori Shibata on September 21 at Destruction in Kobe, Tanahashi announced he was re-entering the IWGP Heavyweight Championship picture and looking to challenge the reigning champion, Bullet Club's A.J. Styles. He received his title shot on October 13 at King of Pro-Wrestling, where he defeated Styles to win the IWGP Heavyweight Championship for the record-breaking seventh time. On November 14, Tanahashi and Yoshitatsu announced they were forming a new tag team named "The World". The World was scheduled to take part in the 2014 World Tag League, but after their opening match on November 22, Yoshitatsu was forced to pull out of the tournament with a neck injury. On January 4, 2015, at Wrestle Kingdom 9 in Tokyo Dome, Tanahashi made his first successful defense of the IWGP Heavyweight Championship against Kazuchika Okada. On February 11 at The New Beginning in Osaka, Tanahashi lost the title back to A.J. Styles, ending his latest reign at 121 days.

==== IWGP Intercontinental Champion (2015–2018) ====
In March, Tanahashi was eliminated from the 2015 New Japan Cup by Toru Yano in less than three minutes, re-igniting the old feud between the two. The rivalry culminated on July 5 at Dominion 7.5 in Osaka-jo Hall, where Tanahashi defeated Yano. From July 20 to August 14, Tanahashi took part in the round-robin stage of the 2015 G1 Climax. He won his block with a record of seven wins and two losses, advancing to the finals. On August 16, Tanahashi defeated Shinsuke Nakamura in the finals to win his second G1 Climax. Tanahashi was handed a contract, which gave him the right to challenge for the IWGP Heavyweight Championship at Wrestle Kingdom 10 in Tokyo Dome, that he would have to defend for the rest of the year. During September and October, Tanahashi successfully defended the contract against Bad Luck Fale and Tetsuya Naito, avenging his two losses suffered during the 2015 G1 Climax. On January 4, 2016, at Wrestle Kingdom 10 in Tokyo Dome, Tanahashi unsuccessfully challenged Kazuchika Okada for the IWGP Heavyweight Championship. The loss ended his Tokyo Dome main event win streak at five. On February 14 at The New Beginning in Niigata, Tanahashi was defeated by Kenny Omega in a match to determine the new IWGP Intercontinental Champion. On March 20, Tanahashi teamed with Juice Robinson and Michael Elgin to unsuccessfully challenge The Elite (Omega and The Young Bucks (Matt Jackson and Nick Jackson)) for the NEVER Openweight 6-Man Tag Team Championship.

On April 10 at Invasion Attack 2016, Tanahashi, Elgin and Yoshitatsu defeated The Elite to become the new NEVER Openweight 6-Man Tag Team Champions. They made their first successful defense on April 23 against Omega, Bad Luck Fale and Yujiro Takahashi. On May 3 at Wrestling Dontaku 2016, they lost the title back to The Elite. Tanahashi was set to challenge Omega for the IWGP Intercontinental Championship in NJPW's first ladder match at Dominion 6.19 in Osaka-jo Hall, but was forced to pull out of the match due to a shoulder injury. From July 18 to August 12, Tanahashi took part in the 2016 G1 Climax, where he finished tied second in his block with a record of five wins, one draw and three losses. A 30-minute time limit draw against Kazuchika Okada on the final day eliminated both men from advancing to the finals. On January 4, 2017, at Wrestle Kingdom 11, Tanahashi unsuccessfully challenged Tetsuya Naito for the IWGP Intercontinental Championship.

The next day at New Year Dash!!, Tanahashi, Manabu Nakanishi and Ryusuke Taguchi defeated Los Ingobernables de Japón (Bushi, Evil and Sanada) for the NEVER Openweight 6-Man Tag Team Championship. They lost the title back to L.I.J. on February 11 at The New Beginning in Osaka. Tanahashi and Taguchi regained the title from L.I.J. with new partner Ricochet on April 4. After defeating L.I.J. member Evil on April 29, Tanahashi confronted the stable's leader Tetsuya Naito and challenged him to a match for the IWGP Intercontinental Championship. On May 3 at Wrestling Dontaku 2017, Tanahashi, Ricochet and Taguchi lost the NEVER Openweight 6-Man Tag Team Championship back to L.I.J. members Bushi, Evil and Sanada. Shortly afterwards, Tanahashi was sidelined with a ruptured biceps tendon. Though he later admitted that a surgery would have been the best option for him, Tanahashi stated that he could not take time off.

Tanahashi returned to the ring on June 11 at Dominion 6.11 in Osaka-jo Hall, where he defeated Tetsuya Naito to win the IWGP Intercontinental Championship for the second time. Tanahashi then entered the 2017 G1 Climax, where he finished with a record of six wins and three losses, failing to make it to the finals due to losing to Naito in their final round-robin match on August 11. Tanahashi then successfully defended the Intercontinental Championship against Zack Sabre Jr. on September 16 at Destruction in Hiroshima and Kota Ibushi on November 5 at Power Struggle, avenging two losses he had suffered during the 2017 G1 Climax. Following the Ibushi match, Tanahashi was attacked by the returning Jay White, who challenged him to a title match on January 4, 2018, at Wrestle Kingdom 12 in Tokyo Dome. After being sidelined with a legitimate knee injury, Tanahashi returned on December 18 to assure he would be wrestling at Wrestle Kingdom 12, at which point he was again attacked by White. On January 4, 2018, Tanahashi defeated White to retain his title. The next day, at New Year's Dash, he was attacked by Minoru Suzuki. On January 27, 2018, at The New Beginning in Sapporo, Tanahashi dropped the title to Suzuki, ending his reign at 230 days.

==== Eight-Time IWGP Heavyweight Champion (2018–2019) ====
After a brief hiatus, Tanahashi returned during the New Japan Cup, reaching the finals only to be defeated by Zack Sabre Jr. At Sakura Genesis 2018, Tanahashi teamed with fellow Taguchi Japan members Juice Robinson and David Finlay to defeat Chaos members Hirooki Goto, Jay White and Yoshi-Hashi. Later in the night, Tanahashi would confront IWGP Heavyweight Champion Kazuchika Okada after Okada defeated Sabre to tie Tanahashi's record for most successful title defenses with eleven, indicating a potential title match in the near future. Their match took place on night two of Wrestling Dontaku 2018, where Tanahashi was unsuccessful in winning the championship, and in the process having his record of most successful title defences in one reign broken, as Okada defended the championship successfully for the twelfth time.

Tanahashi then took part in the 2018 G1 Climax, where he finished with a record of seven wins, one draw, and one loss, thus setting a new record for the most points in the current 20-man G1 format with 15 and advancing to the finals, where he defeated Kota Ibushi to win his third G1 Climax tournament. This earned him the right to challenge for the IWGP Heavyweight Championship at Wrestle Kingdom 13 that he would have to defend for the remainder of the year and marked the tenth time he would main event the show. As the only men he failed to defeat in his block, Tanahashi nominated Okada and White to be his challengers for the contract. On September 23, at Destruction in Kobe, Tanahashi defeated Okada to retain the contract and was promptly assaulted by White. On October 8, at King of Pro-Wrestling, he retained the contract against White.

On January 4, 2019, at Wrestle Kingdom 13, Tanahashi defeated Kenny Omega to become IWGP Heavyweight Champion for the eighth time, breaking his own record for most reigns in the process, and becoming the first Tokyo Dome IWGP Heavyweight Championship challenge rights certificate holder to successfully become champion at Wrestle Kingdom. On February 11 at The New Beginning in Osaka, Tanahashi lost the IWGP Heavyweight Championship to Jay White, ending his reign at 38 days. At the G1 Supercard in April, Tanahashi unsuccessfully faced Zack Sabre Jr. for the British Heavyweight Championship. At Dominion 6.9 on June 9, Tanahashi teamed with Juice Robinson and Ryusuke Taguchi to defeat the Bullet Club (Jay White, Chase Owens and Taiji Ishimori). On August 31 at Royal Quest, Tanahashi defeated Sabre for the British Heavyweight Championship, but lost it back in a rematch at Destruction in Beppu on September 15.

==== Triple Crown and Grand Slam Champion (2019–2023) ====
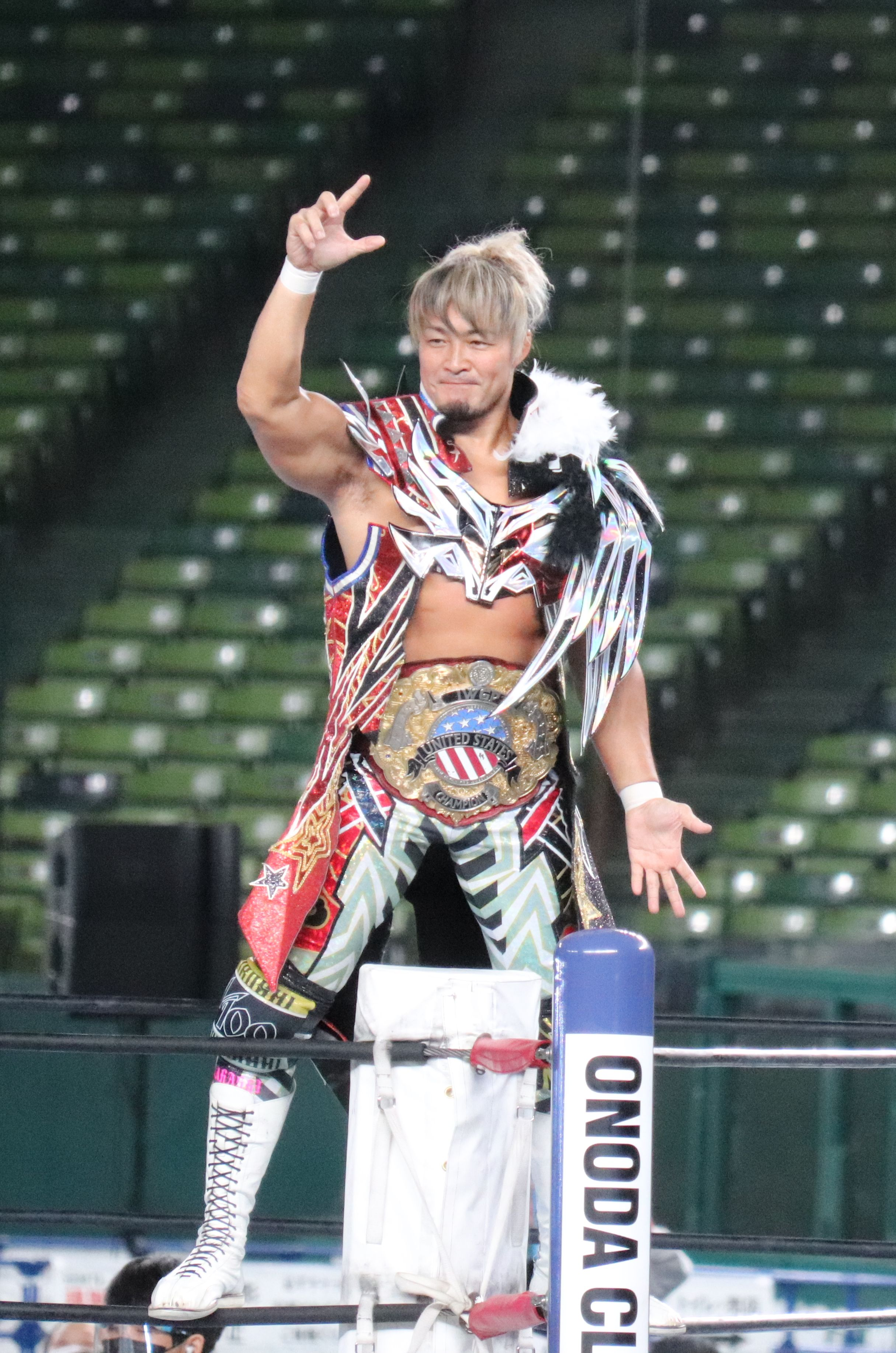
Tanahashi at Wrestle Grand Slam in MetLife Dome in 2021

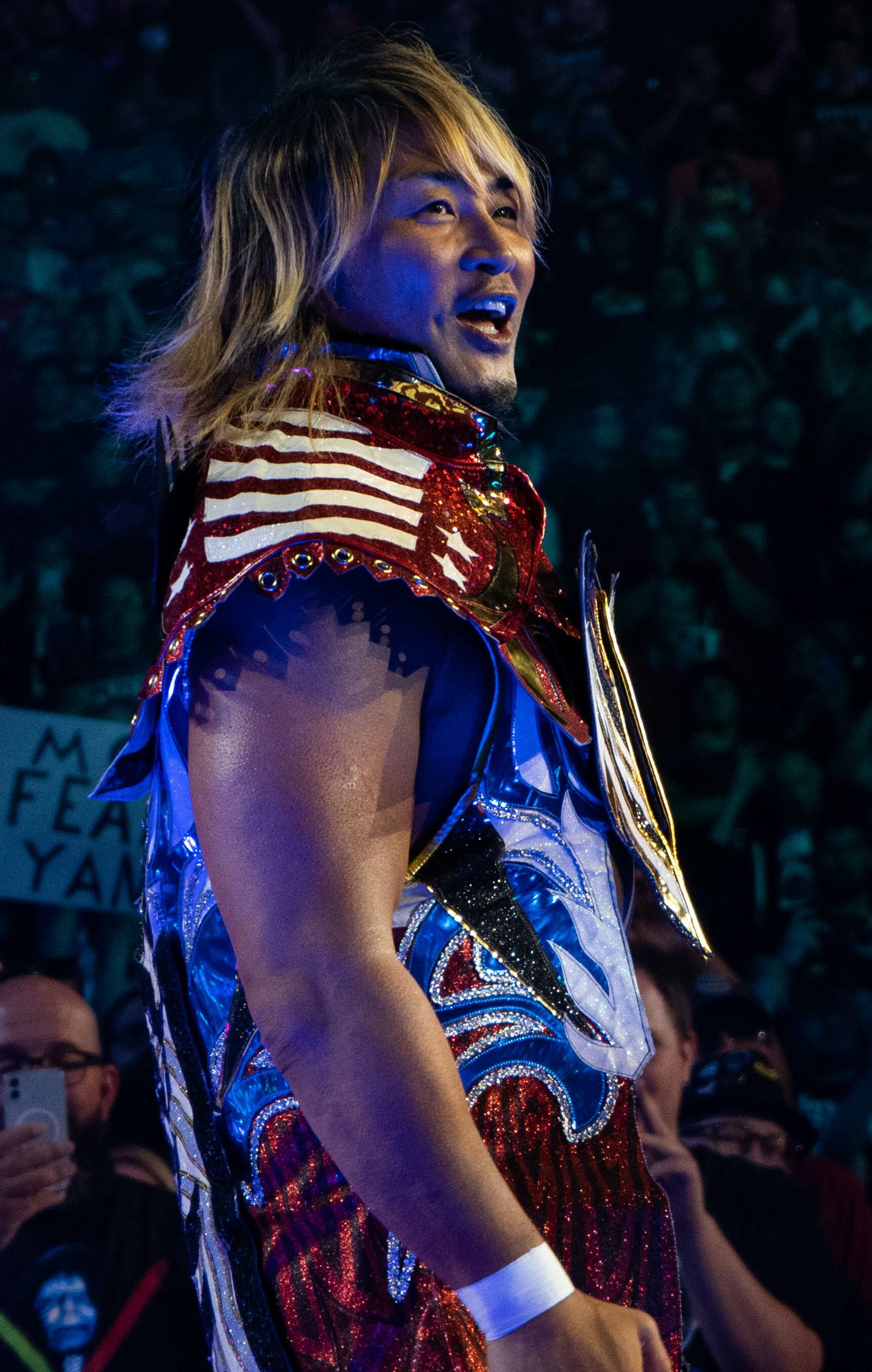
Tanahashi at Forbidden Door in 2022

At Power Struggle in November, Tanahashi was called out by Chris Jericho for a match at Wrestle Kingdom 14, which Tanahashi accepted. On the second night of the event, Jericho defeated Tanahashi. Following this, Tanahashi started a tag team with Kota Ibushi. On February 21, 2020, and on night three of New Japan Road, Tanahashi and Ibushi, dubbing themselves Golden☆Ace, defeated the Guerrillas of Destiny (Tama Tonga and Tanga Loa) to win the IWGP Tag Team Championship. Following the win, they were attacked by Dangerous Tekkers (Taichi and Zack Sabre Jr.) On July 12, at Dominion, Tanahashi and Ibushi were defeated by Dangerous Tekkers, ending their reign at 142 days. From September 19 to October 18, Tanahashi took part in the G1 Climax, where he finished in his block with a record of four wins and five losses. One of his victories was over Kenta, meaning Tanahashi could challenge Kenta for his shot at the IWGP United States Heavyweight Championship, which was confirmed on the night of the final. On November 7, at Power Struggle, Kenta defeated Tanahashi.

After this, Tanahashi began feuding with the newly formed United Empire. At Wrestle Kingdom 15 Night 1, he defeated Great-O-Khan. At The New Beginning in Nagoya, Tanahashi defeated Shingo Takagi to win the NEVER Openweight Championship for the first time, becoming NJPW's fourth Triple Crown champion in the process. At Castle Attack, Tanahashi retained the title in a rematch with Khan, which was his only successful title defense. After being eliminated in the New Japan Cup tournament by Jay White, he started challenging Tanahashi for a title match. At Sakura Genesis, Tanahashi teamed up with Satoshi Kojima to defeat White and Bad Luck Fale in a tag team match. On the first night Wrestling Dontaku, Tanahashi lost the title to Jay White in the main event, ending his reign at 93 days. On July 25, it was announced that Tanahashi would face Shingo Takagi at Wrestle Grand Slam in Tokyo Dome for the IWGP World Heavyweight Championship after Kota Ibushi was unable to compete. At the event, Tanahashi lost to Takagi.

On August 14, at Resurgence, Tanahashi defeated Lance Archer for the IWGP United States Heavyweight Championship, winning the title for the first time, becoming the first Japanese wrestler to win the title, and becoming the second Grand Slam champion in NJPW history. Following his win, Tanahashi challenged Kota Ibushi to a match at Wrestle Grand Slam in MetLife Dome for his first title defense, which Ibushi accepted. On Night 1 of the event, Tanahashi defeated Ibushi to retain the title. Tanahashi then took part in the G1 Climax from September 18 to October 21 and finished with four wins and five losses and failing to advance to the finals. At Power Struggle on November 6, Tanahashi lost the title to Kenta, ending his reign at 84 days. On the second night of Wrestle Kingdom 16, Tanahashi defeated Kenta to regain the title and won the title for a second time. At New Years Golden Series on February 19, Tanahashi lost the title to Sanada, ending his second reign at 45 days.

At Wrestling Dontaku on May 1, Tanahashi was originally supposed to face Will Ospreay for the vacant IWGP United States Heavyweight Championship, but Ospreay was pulled from the match after testing positive for COVID-19, and was replaced by Tomohiro Ishii. At the event, Tanahashi defeated Ishii to win the title for a record-setting third time. Shortly after, Tanahashi was confronted by Chase Owens, which turned out to be a distraction for the returning Juice Robinson, who had joined Bullet Club, to attack him and stake his claim for the championship. At Capital Collision, Tanahashi lost the title to Robinson in a Four-way match also involving Ospreay and Jon Moxley, and ended his third reign at 13 days.

On June 12 also during Dominion, Tanahashi was announced as a participant in the G1 Climax 32 tournament starting in July, as a part of the C block. He finished with 6 points, failing to advance to the semi-finals. On September 25 at Burning Spirit, Tanahashi challenged Karl Anderson for the Never Openweight Championship but was defeated. At Noah Ariake Triumph in October, Tanahashi made a return to Pro Wrestling Noah, for the first time in 9 years, teaming with Togi Makabe and Tomoaki Honma in a losing effort to Keiji Muto, Naomichi Marufuji and Yoshiki Inamura. In November, Tanahashi once again teamed with Toru Yano in the World Tag League, but failed to advance to the finals after finishing with 8 points. On January 4 at Wrestle Kingdom 17, Tanahashi teamed with Muto and Shota Umino to defeat Tetsuya Naito, Bushi and Sanada, in Muto's last NJPW match.

On March 6, Tanahashi teamed with Kazuchika Okada to challenge for the IWGP Tag Team Championships, but the duo was defeated by Hirooki Goto and Yoshi-Hashi. Later that month at Supercard of Honor, Tanahashi returned to Ring of Honor for the first time since 2019, defeating Daniel Garcia. In April at Capital Collision, Tanahashi once again teamed with Okada in a three-way tag-team match for the Strong Openweight Tag Team Championships. The match, which also involved The Motor City Machine Guns (Alex Shelley and Chris Sabin), was won by Aussie Open (Kyle Fletcher and Mark Davis). In May, at Wrestling Dontaku, Tanahashi teamed with Okada and Tomohiro Ishii to defeat Minoru Suzuki, El Desperado and Ren Narita, to win his fourth NEVER Openweight 6-Man Tag Team Championship. On May 21 at Resurgence, Tanahashi participated in a tournament to determine the Number 1 Contender for the IWGP US Heavyweight Championship, but was defeated in the first round by Will Ospreay. At the Dominion 6.4 in Osaka-jo Hall event on June 4, Okada, Ishii and Tanahashi successfully defended the NEVER Openweight 6-Man Tag Team Championship against Blackpool Combat Club (BCC) (Jon Moxley and Claudio Castagnoli) and Shota Umino. The following month, Tanahashi entered the G1 Climax tournament, competing in the D Block. Tanahashi finished the tournament, with 6 points, therefore failing to advance to the quarterfinals. Tanahashi, Okada and Ishii continued defending their Never Openweight 6-man tag-team Championships, defeating Impact Wrestling's, Motor City Machine Guns (Alex Shelley and Chris Sabin) and Josh Alexander, at Destruction in Ryōgoku in October.

==== Final years and retirement (2023–2026) ====
On December 23, NJPW announced that Takami Ohbari had stepped down as the promotion's president, with Tanahashi replacing him as NJPW president and representative director.

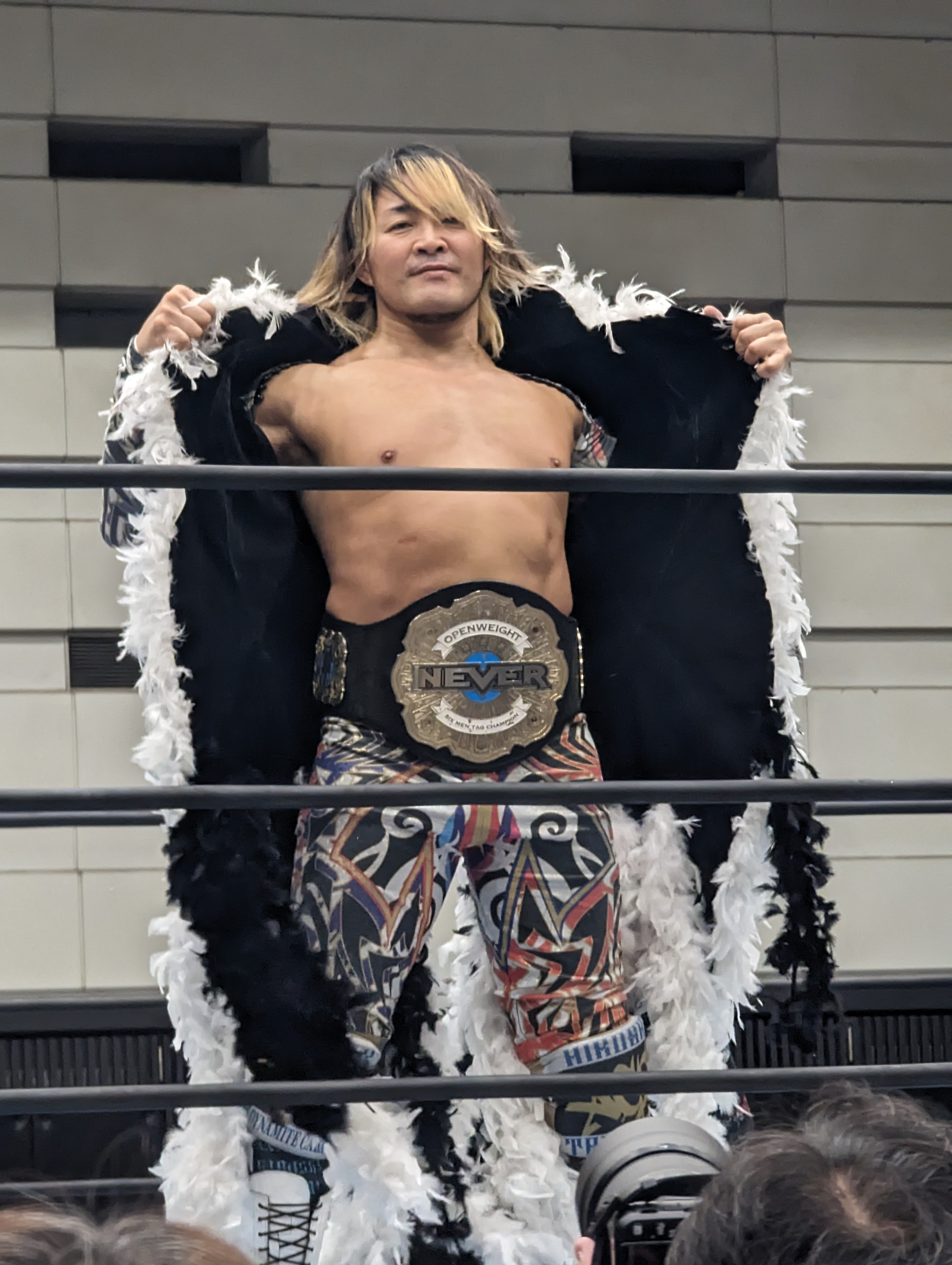
Tanahashi as one third of the NEVER Openweight 6-Man Tag Team Champion in April 2024

At Wrestle Kingdom 18, Tanahashi defeated Zack Sabre Jr. to become the new NJPW World Television Champion. On January 24, after successfully defending the NEVER Openweight 6-Man Tag Team Championship against TMDK (Kosei Fujita, Mikey Nicholls, Shane Haste), Okada decided to vacate the titles, due to him leaving NJPW, ending their reign at 266 days. On February 11 at The New Beginning in Osaka, Tanahashi was defeated by Kazuchika Okada in the last match between them, ending their long-standing rivalry. On February 23 at The New Beginning in Sapporo, Tanahashi lost the NJPW World Television Championship to Matt Riddle. On April 14 at Wrestling World, Tanahashi, Toru Yano and Oleg Boltin defeated House of Torture (Evil, Sho and Yoshinobu Kanemaru) in a tournament final to win the vacant NEVER Openweight 6-Man Tag Team Championship. They lost the titles to Los Ingobernables de Japón (Yota Tsuji, Hiromu Takahashi and Bushi) on June 9 at Dominion 6.9 in Osaka-jo Hall, only to regain them on June 16. On October 14, at King of Pro-Wrestling, Tanahashi announced that 2025 will be his final year as a pro-wrestler, retiring at Wrestle Kingdom 20 on January 4, 2026.

On January 4, 2025, at Wrestle Kingdom 19, Tanahashi defeated Evil. After the match, he was attacked by House of Torture only to be saved by a returning Katsuyori Shibata, who proceeded to challenge Tanahashi to a match on the next night at Wrestle Dynasty. At Wrestle Dynasty, Tanahashi and Shibata wrestled to a 5-minute time-limit draw. On February 11 at The New Beginning in Osaka, Tanahashi defeated Togi Makabe. On March 3 at the NJPW 53rd Anniversary Show, Tanahashi unsuccessfully challenged Hirooki Goto for the IWGP World Heavyweight Championship. On April 4 at Sakura Genesis, Tanahashi was defeated by Shota Umino. On April 11 at Windy City Riot, Tanahashi wrestled his final match in the United States, losing to Konosuke Takeshita. From July to August, Tanahashi competed in his final G1 Climax tournament, where he was placed in A-Block. He finished his block with 8 points and failed to advance to the bracket stage. On August 24 at Forbidden Door, Tanahashi wrestled his final match in the United Kingdom, teaming with Darby Allin, the Golden Lovers (Kenny Omega and Kota Ibushi), and Will Ospreay to defeat the Death Riders, The Young Bucks, and Gabe Kidd a lights out steel cage match. On November 8, Tanahahsi defeated Yuto Nakashima.

After the match, Tanahashi was confronted by a returning Kazuchika Okada, who was confirmed to be Tanahashi's opponent in his retirement match at Wrestle Kingdom 20. At Wrestle Kingdom on January 4, 2026, Tanahashi wrestled the final match of his 25-year career, being defeated by Okada. Following the match, Tanahashi received a retirement ceremony in the ring for him, featuring appearances from Keiji Mutoh, Tatsumi Fujinami, and Katsuyori Shibata, among other rivals and allies from notable points in his career.

==== Post-retirement and corporate roles (2026–present) ====
After retiring from in-ring competition, Tanahashi would continue to appear for NJPW at events and press conferences in his president and representative director role.

=== Consejo Mundial de Lucha Libre (2005, 2010–2013) ===
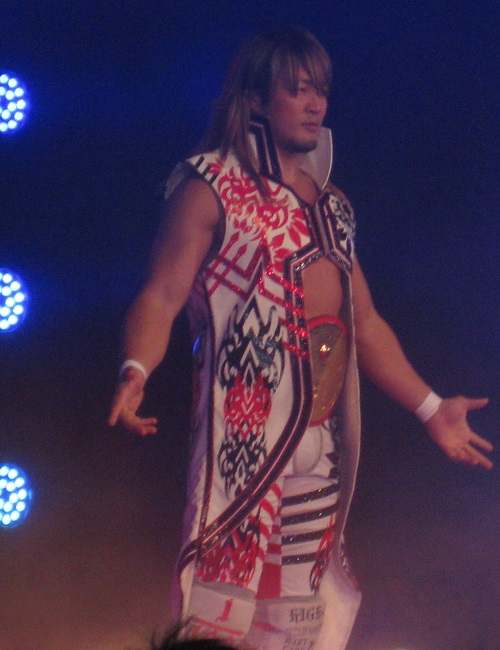
Tanahashi wearing the CMLL Universal Championship belt in September 2013

Tanahashi made his North American debut in September 2005 when he and Nakamura went to Consejo Mundial de Lucha Libre (CMLL) in Mexico. There, they feuded with Los Guerreros del Infierno and successfully defended their IWGP Tag Team Championship against Rey Bucanero and Olímpico. Tanahashi returned to Mexico and CMLL in May 2010 to join La Ola Amarilla (Spanish for "the Yellow Wave") with fellow Japanese wrestlers Okumura, and Taichi. On May 7, 2010 La Ola Amarilla defeated El Hijo del Fantasma, La Máscara and Héctor Garza to win the CMLL World Trios Championship in the main event of the weekly Friday night Super Viernes show. Ola Amarilla's reign as Trios champions only lasted two weeks as they were defeated by La Máscara, La Sombra and Máscara Dorada on May 21, 2010. Following the show Tanahashi returned to Japan for the next tour of NJPW, but intended to return to CMLL between tours of NJPW. In August 2011, Tanahashi returned to CMLL and, as the reigning IWGP Heavyweight Champion, was allowed to enter the promotion's annual tournament of champions to crown the Universal Champion. Tanahashi entered the tournament on September 9; after eliminating CMLL World Welterweight Champion Máscara Dorada in his first round match, Tanahashi himself was eliminated from the tournament in the second round by CMLL World Tag Team Champion Último Guerrero. Tanahashi returned to CMLL on August 24, 2012, again taking part in the Universal Championship tournament, winning his block to advance to the finals. On August 31, Tanahashi was defeated in the finals of the tournament by CMLL World Heavyweight Champion El Terrible. Tanahashi finished his CMLL tour on September 7, when he teamed with Namajague, Okumura and Taichi in a Japan vs. Mexico torneo cibernetico, where they faced Black Warrior, La Máscara, Negro Casas and Valiente. In the end, Tanahashi pinned La Máscara, following interference from Taichi, to win the match for the Japanese. Tanahashi returned to CMLL a year later on August 23, 2013, when he teamed with Namajague and Puma in a six-man tag team match, where they were defeated by Marco Corleone, Máximo and Shocker. Tanahashi worked the tour as rudo, opposing Atlantis. On August 30, Tanahashi entered the 2013 Universal Championship tournament, where he won his block by defeating La Sombra in the finals, with help from Volador Jr., to advance to his second Universal Championship final in a row. On September 6, Tanahashi defeated Rush to win the tournament and become the 2013 Universal Champion.

=== Total Nonstop Action Wrestling / Impact Wrestling (2006, 2008, 2023) ===
He debuted in the United States with TNA on January 14, 2006, at Final Resolution, where he was defeated by A.J. Styles. He was also featured in a match against Roderick Strong that was taped for Xplosion a few days later.

Tanahashi returned to TNA in 2008 for an excursion and on the October 30 episode of Impact! lost in a tag team match with Volador Jr. against Motor City Machine Guns (Alex Shelley and Chris Sabin). After the match, they were berated by Sheik Abdul Bashir. On the November 6 episode of Impact!, Tanahashi teamed with Volador again in a four-way ladder match for number one contendership for Beer Money's TNA World Tag Team Championship against Team 3D (Brother Devon and Brother Ray), Matt Morgan and Abyss and The Latin American Xchange (Hernandez and Homicide), which Morgan and Abyss won. At Turning Point, Tanahashi participated in a 10-man X Division seeding match where he came fourth. Following the announcement of his IWGP Heavyweight title match against Mutoh, Tanahashi cancelled the rest of his TNA dates to return to NJPW full-time.

At Multiverse United on March 30, Tanahashi returned to Impact where he defeated Mike Bailey. Tanahashi returned for the subsequent event, Multiverse United 2 on August 20, facing Alex Shelley for the Impact World Championship, in a losing effort.

=== All Elite Wrestling (2022–2025) ===
On May 5, 2022, New Japan announced an event along with All Elite Wrestling (AEW), called Forbidden Door, to take place on June 26. On the June 1 episode of Dynamite, Tanahashi made a surprise appearance to reveal himself as the opponent of AEW World Champion CM Punk, where the match was scheduled for Forbidden Door. However, Punk was announced to be injured, although not vacating the championship. Therefore, at NJPW's Dominion, Tanahashi defeated Hirooki Goto to earn a match against Jon Moxley for the interim championship at the event. At the event, Tanahashi was defeated by Moxley. On June 25, 2023, at Forbidden Door, Tanahashi unsuccessfully challenged MJF for the AEW World Championship. On June 30, 2024, at Forbidden Door, Tanahashi teamed with The Acclaimed (Anthony Bowens and Max Caster), losing to The Elite (Kazuchika Okada, Matthew Jackson, and Nicholas Jackson). On May 25, 2025, at Double or Nothing, Tanahashi made a surprise appearance, where he helped Brody King, Tomohiro Ishii, and the Paragon fend off the Don Callis Family. On August 24, 2025, at Forbidden Door, Tanahashi wrestled his final match in the United Kingdom, teaming with Golden Lovers (Kenny Omega and Kota Ibushi), Darby Allin, and Will Ospreay to defeat Death Riders (Jon Moxley and Claudio Castagnoli), Gabe Kidd, and The Young Bucks (Matt Jackson and Nick Jackson) in a Lights Out Steel Cage match, pinning Matt Jackson with a High Fly Flow.

== Professional wrestling style and persona ==
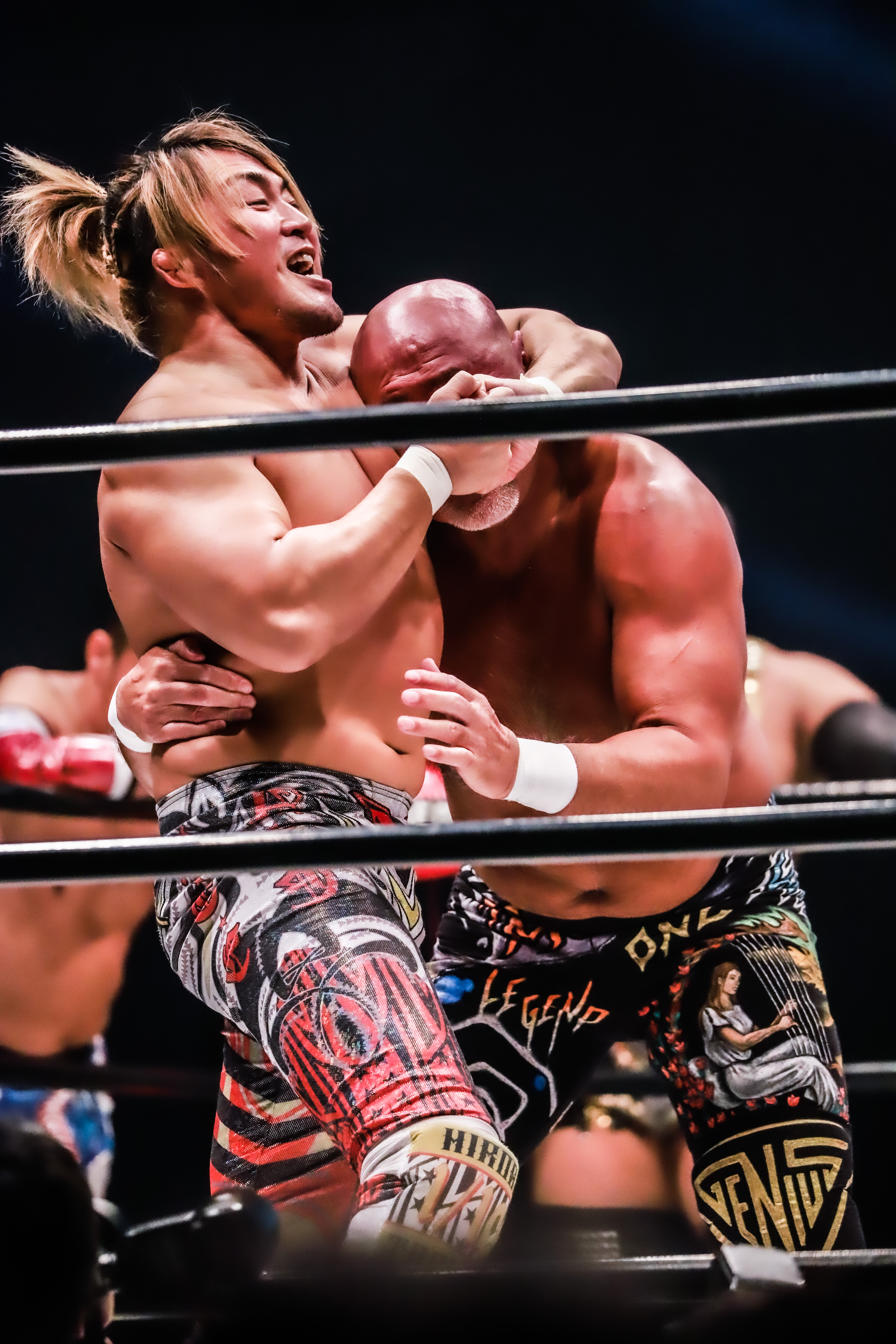
Tanahashi facing Keiji Muto at Noah Ariake Triumph on October 30, 2022.

Being trained by the NJPW Dojo, Tanahashi learned shoot techniques, catch and boxing moves to include in his moveset. During his career, he has used several moves as finishing holds, like the High Fly Flow (a frog splash), the sling blade, the dragon suplex and the Texas clover hold.

After his first title defense against Shinsuke Nakamura, Tanahashi dubbed himself as "the ace of the universe", a nickname that used during his career. When he debuted, he was seen as an innovator because he said "I love you" to his fans after the match and played an air-guitar, something very unusual in NJPW.

== Personal life ==
Tanahashi married his wife in 2003 and has two children, a son named Shiryu and a daughter named Koharu.

== Other media ==
Since 2010, Tanahashi has hosted a podcast known as Podcast Off (棚橋弘至のPODCAST OFF!!, Tanahashi Hiroshi no poddokyasuto ofu). Guests on the podcast have included fellow wrestlers Keiji Muto, Tatsumi Fujinami, Ryusuke Taguchi and Naomichi Marufuji, as well as Weekly Pro-Wrestling editor-in-chief Naoya Yuzawa and then-President of NJPW, Takumi Ohbari. In 2022, the podcast was briefly guest hosted by Master Wato, who has also been a guest on the podcast. A special edition of the podcast was released on June 6, 2023, to celebrate the announcement of the All Together Again cross-promotional event; the guests were Pro Wrestling Noah's Kaito Kiyomiya and All Japan Pro Wrestling's Kento Miyahara, who had taken part of the announcement of the show alongside Tanahashi. Another special edition of the podcast was released on September 18, 2023, featuring Tanahashi, Taguchi, Wato, and Shota Umino reminiscing about the town of Nagatoro on a bus.

His book, Why Hiroshi Tanahashi Was Able To Change NJPW, was released in 2014.

In 2016, Tanahashi, along with fellow wrestler Togi Makabe, appeared in Garo: Ashura, the 10th anniversary special of the Japanese tokusatsu series Garo, with Tanahashi starring as the eponymous Golden Knight. The Garo Project production team collaborated with New Japan Pro-Wrestling for the special. Both Tanahashi and Makabe also appeared in the 2016 Doraemon movie, Doraemon: Nobita and the Birth of Japan 2016.

Tanahashi, along with fellow NJPW wrestlers Hiroyoshi Tenzan, Kazuchika Okada, Satoshi Kojima, Tetsuya Naito and Toru Yano, appears as a member of the gang Justis in the 2016 video game Yakuza 6: The Song of Life. He is also a fan of the Kamen Rider series, working poses from Kamen Rider Kabuto and Kamen Rider W into his ring entrance as well as appearing in the music video for Kamen Rider Wizard's opening theme, and in 2016 got promoted to portray one of the main villains, Sōji Kuruse/Robol Bugster, in Kamen Rider Heisei Generations: Dr. Pac-Man vs. Ex-Aid & Ghost with Legend Rider. He also appears as a character in the anime series Tiger Mask W, voiced by Kenichi Suzumura, along with other NJPW wrestlers and plays a prominent role in the story as well as an occasional opponent for Tiger Mask. As part of a collaboration with Namco's 2017 fighting game Tekken 7, the video game character Lars Alexandersson was given many traits from Tanahashi, including his outfit, a theme song and a wrestling technique. Tanahashi made his acting debut in the film My Dad Is a Heel Wrestler, which was released in September 2018.

== Championships and accomplishments ==
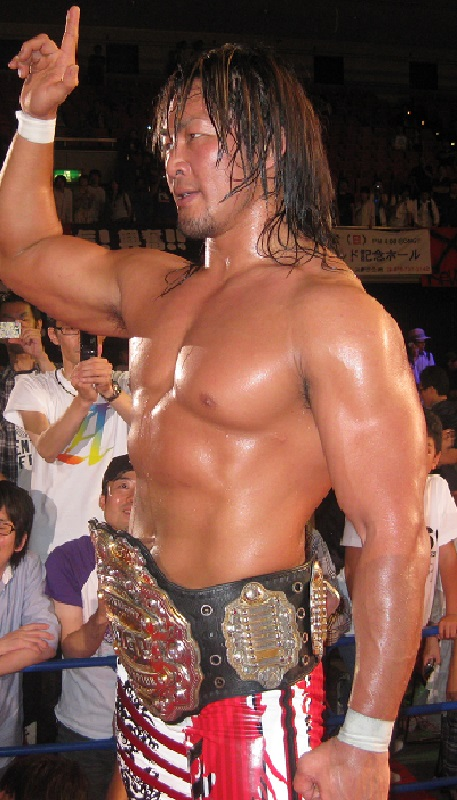
Tanahashi is a record eight-time IWGP Heavyweight Champion...

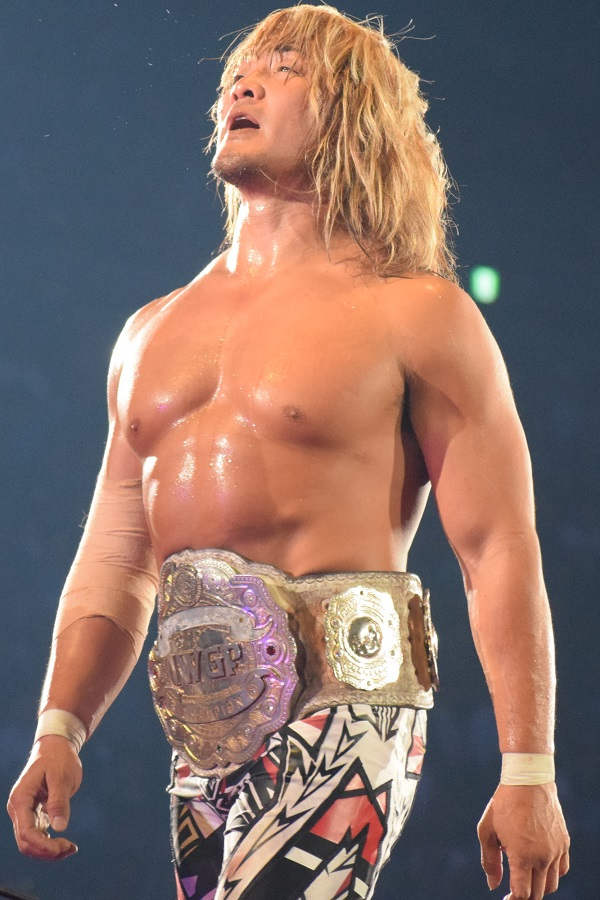
...a two-time IWGP Intercontinental Champion...

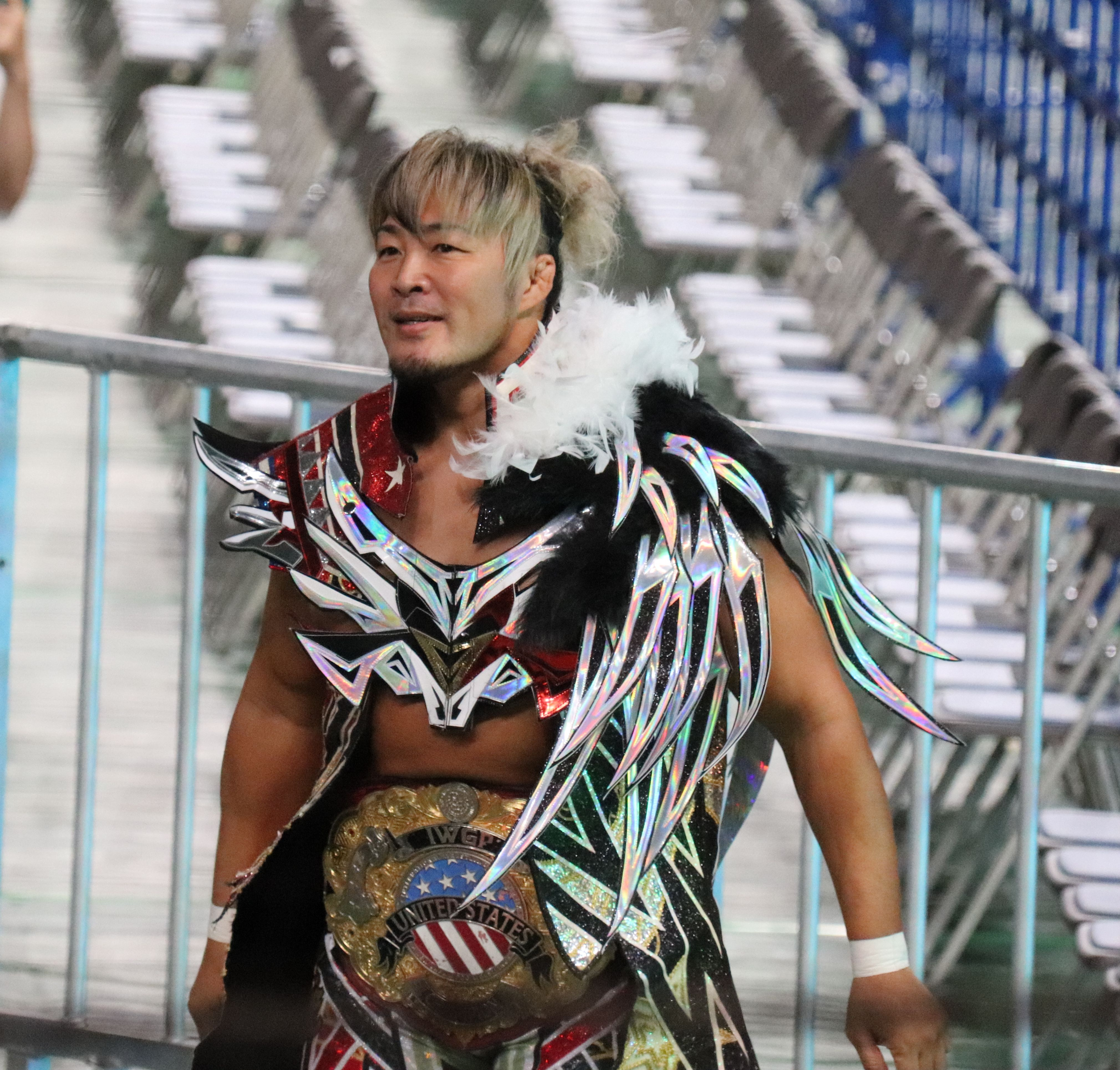
...a three-time IWGP United States Heavyweight Champion...

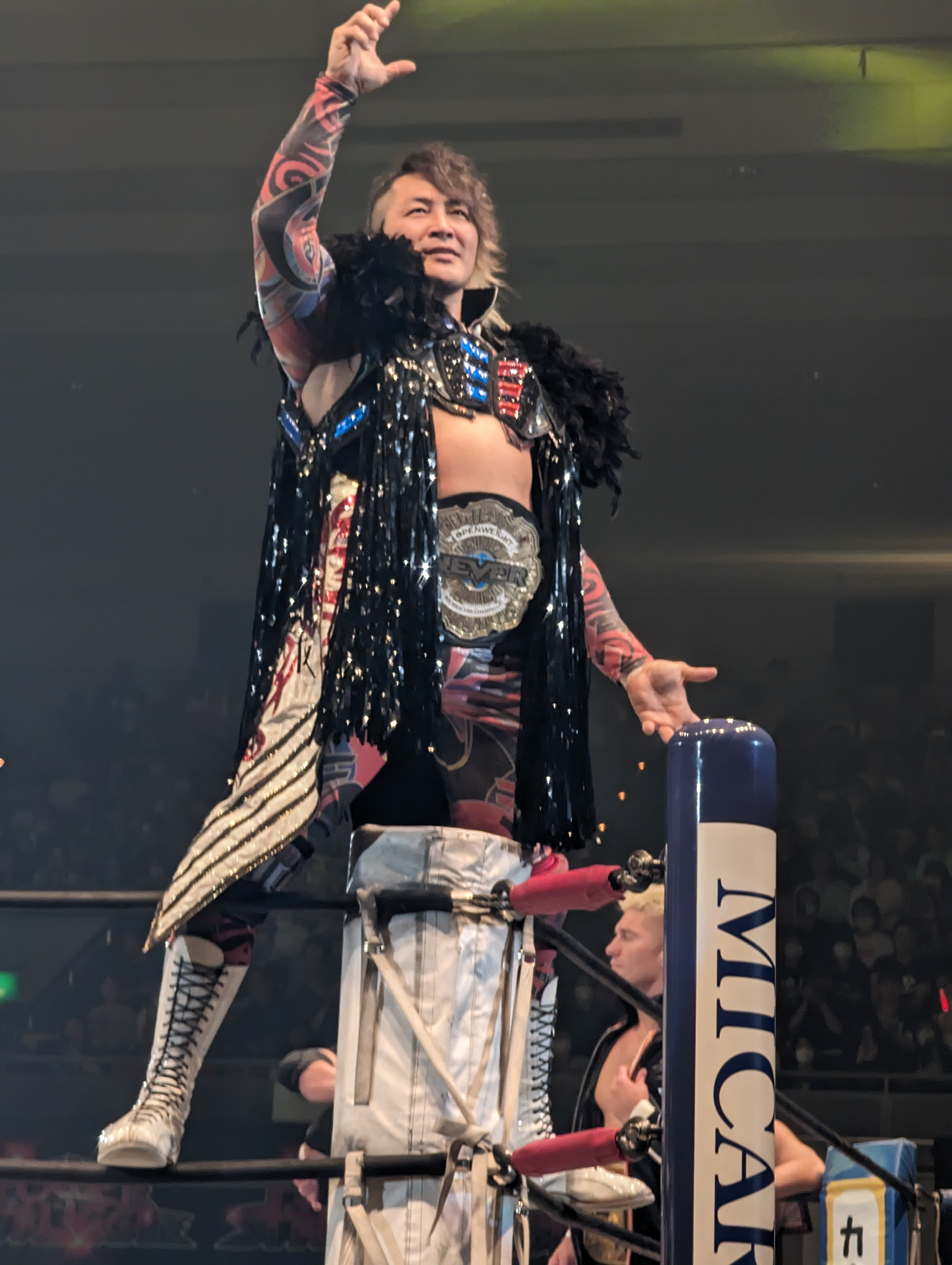
...a six-time NEVER Openweight 6-Man Tag Team Champion...

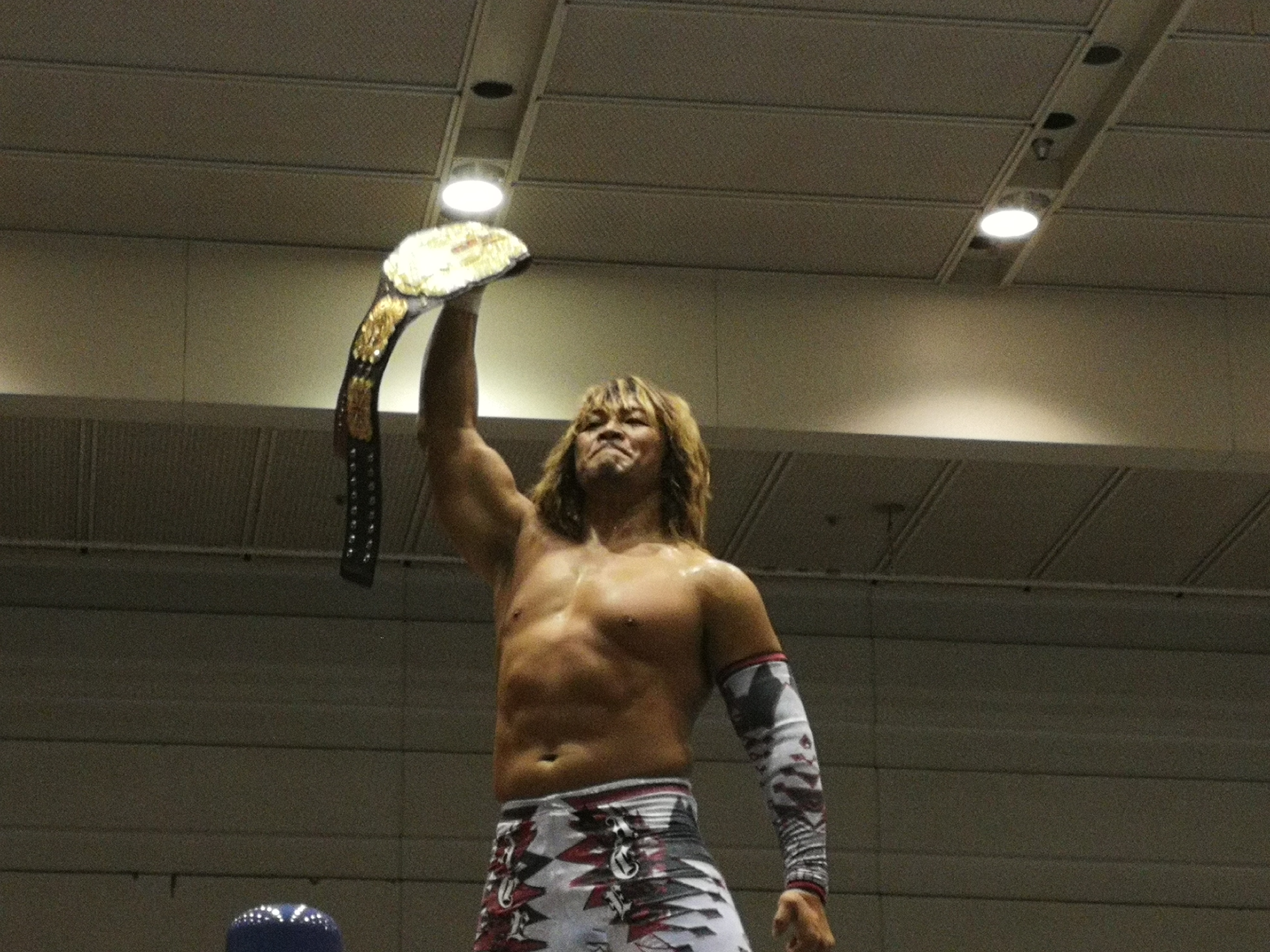
...and through NJPW's partnership with Revolution Pro Wrestling, a former British Heavyweight Champion.

- Consejo Mundial de Lucha Libre
  - CMLL World Tag Team Championship (1 time) – with Jushin Thunder Liger
  - CMLL World Trios Championship (1 time) – with Okumura and Taichi
  - CMLL Universal Championship (2013)
- New Japan Pro-Wrestling
  - IWGP Heavyweight Championship (8 times)
  - IWGP Intercontinental Championship (2 times)
  - IWGP United States Heavyweight Championship (3 times)
  - NJPW World Television Championship (1 time)
  - IWGP Tag Team Championship (3 times) – with Yutaka Yoshie (1), Shinsuke Nakamura (1), and Kota Ibushi (1)
  - IWGP U-30 Openweight Championship (2 times, inaugural, final)
  - NEVER Openweight Championship (1 time)
  - NEVER Openweight 6-Man Tag Team Championship (6 times) – with Michael Elgin and Yoshitatsu (1), Manabu Nakanishi and Ryusuke Taguchi (1), Ricochet and Ryusuke Taguchi (1), Kazuchika Okada and Tomohiro Ishii (1) and Toru Yano and Oleg Boltin (2)
  - Fourth NJPW Triple Crown Champion
  - Second NJPW Grand Slam Champion
  - G1 Climax (2007, 2015, 2018)
  - G2 U-30 Climax (2003)
  - New Japan Cup (2005, 2008)
  - IWGP Heavyweight Title Tournament (2006)
  - IWGP U-30 Openweight Championship League (2005)
  - U-30 One Night Tag Tournament (2004) – with Taiji Ishimori
  - Heavyweight Tag MVP Award (2005) with Shinsuke Nakamura
  - Fighting Spirit Award (2003)
  - New Wave Award (2002)
  - Outstanding Performance Award (2003, 2004)
  - Singles Best Bout (2004) vs. Hiroyoshi Tenzan on August 15
  - Young Lion Award (2001)
  - New Japan Pro-Wrestling MVP (2018)
- Nikkan Sports
  - Fighting Spirit Award (2003)
  - MVP Award (2011, 2014, 2018)
  - Match of the Year Award (2009) vs. Shinsuke Nakamura on November 8
  - Match of the Year Award (2012) vs. Kazuchika Okada on February 12
- Pro Wrestling Illustrated
  - Ranked No. 3 of the top 500 singles wrestlers in the PWI 500 in 2013
- Pro Wrestling Noah
  - GHC Tag Team Championship (1 time) – with Yuji Nagata
- Revolution Pro Wrestling
  - British Heavyweight Championship (1 time)
- Sports Illustrated
  - Ranked No. 8 of the top 10 men's wrestlers in 2018
- Tokyo Sports
  - Best Bout Award (2012) vs. Kazuchika Okada on June 16
  - Fighting Spirit Award (2003, 2006)
  - MVP Award (2009, 2011, 2014, 2018)
  - Outstanding Performance Award (2007)
- Wrestling Observer Newsletter
  - Feud of the Year (2012–2013) vs. Kazuchika Okada
  - Most Charismatic (2013)
  - Most Outstanding Wrestler (2012–2013)
  - Match of the Year (2012) vs. Minoru Suzuki on October 8
  - Match of the Year (2013) vs. Kazuchika Okada on April 7
  - Match of the Year (2016) vs. Kazuchika Okada on January 4
  - Wrestler of the Year (2011–2013)
  - Wrestler of the Decade (2010s)
  - Most Charismatic of the Decade (2010s)
  - Wrestling Observer Newsletter Hall of Fame (Class of 2013)

=== Luchas de Apuestas record ===
Winner (wager)	Loser (wager)	Location	Event	Date	Notes
Hiroshi Tanahashi (hair)	Makai #2 (mask)	Osaka, Japan	Osaka Dream Night	August 28, 2003	
Hiroshi Tanahashi (hair)	Toru Yano (hair)	Osaka, Japan	Dominion 6.19	June 19, 2010	
