= Sengoku Lord in Nagoya (2020) =

2020 New Japan Pro-Wrestling event

- Promotion: New Japan Pro-Wrestling
- Date: July 25, 2020
- City: Nagoya, Japan
- Venue: Aichi Prefectural Gymnasium
- Attendance: 2,200

Pay-per-view chronology
← Previous; Dominion in Osaka-jo Hall; New Japan Road	Next → Summer Struggle

Sengoku Lord chronology
← Previous; 2019	Next → —

Sengoku Lord in Nagoya was a professional wrestling event promoted by New Japan Pro-Wrestling (NJPW). The event took place on July 25, 2020, in Nagoya, Aichi, at the Aichi Prefectural Gymnasium and was the second event under the Sengoku Lord name, the second in a row in Nagoya, and second in a row that took place at the Aichi Prefectural Gymnasium.

== Background ==
Sengoku Lord in Nagoya took place on July 25, 2020. Due to the effects of the COVID-19 pandemic, the arena was limited to one-third of its capacity.

== Storylines ==
Sengoku Lord in Nagoya featured professional wrestling matches that involve different wrestlers from pre-existing scripted feuds and storylines. Wrestlers portray villains, heroes, or less distinguishable characters in the scripted events that built tension and culminated in a wrestling match or series of matches.

== Results ==
No.	Results	Stipulations	Times
1	Taiji Ishimori defeated Yuya Uemura by submission	Singles match	8:02
2	Taguchi Japan (Togi Makabe, Satoshi Kojima and Ryusuke Taguchi) defeated Chaos (Tomohiro Ishii and Toru Yano) and Gabriel Kidd	Six-man tag team match	10:25
3	Los Ingobernables de Japón (Tetsuya Naito, Sanada and Bushi) defeated Chaos (Hirooki Goto, Yoshi-Hashi and Sho) by submission	Six-man tag team match	10:31
4	Golden☆Ace (Hiroshi Tanahashi and Kota Ibushi), Yuji Nagata, Hiroyoshi Tenzan and Master Wato defeated Suzuki-gun (Taichi, Zack Sabre Jr., Minoru Suzuki, Yoshinobu Kanemaru and Douki)	Ten-man tag team match	12:55
5	Kazuchika Okada defeated Yujiro Takahashi by submission	Singles match	13:43
6	Shingo Takagi (c) defeated El Desperado	Singles match for the NEVER Openweight Championship	17:03
7	Evil (c) defeated Hiromu Takahashi	Singles match for both the IWGP Heavyweight Championship and the IWGP Intercontinental Championship	33:57
(c) / – the champion(s) heading into the match

== See also ==
- 2020 in professional wrestling
- List of NJPW pay-per-view events
