= Summer Struggle in Jingu =

2020 professional wrestling event in Japan

- Official logo of the event
- Promotion: New Japan Pro-Wrestling
- Date: August 29, 2020
- City: Tokyo, Japan
- Venue: Meiji Jingu Stadium
- Attendance: 4,710

Event chronology
← Previous; Sengoku Lord in Nagoya; Summer Struggle	Next → Fighting Spirit Unleashed

Summer Struggle chronology
← Previous; First	Next → Summer Struggle in Sapporo

Summer Struggle in Jingu was a professional wrestling event promoted by New Japan Pro-Wrestling (NJPW). The event took place on August 29, 2020, in Tokyo, Japan at Meiji Jingu Stadium.

== Background ==
On March 1, 2020, NJPW suspended all future live events due to the COVID-19 pandemic. Because of this, many of their annual tours and tournaments, such as the New Japan Cup, Best of the Super Juniors, and a summer tour scheduled in Hokkaido, in place of where the G1 Climax would normally be (which was moved to September, due to the upcoming, now postponed 2020 Tokyo Olympics) were canceled. To make up for the lost dates, on June 26, 2020, NJPW announced the Summer Struggle tour to run from July 27 to August 29. On July 25, 2020, NJPW announced the culmination of the Summer Struggle tour to take place in Meiji Jingu Stadium, the first NJPW event inside the stadium since 1999 with last event being Jingu Climax.

== Storylines ==
Other on-screen personnel
Role:	Name:
English Commentators	Kevin Kelly
English Commentators	Chris Charlton
Japanese commentators	Yuichi Tabata (1st & 4th matches)
Japanese commentators	Shinpei Nogami (2nd & 6th matches)
Japanese commentators	Shinji Yoshino (3rd & 5th matches)
Japanese commentators	Milano Collection A.T.
Japanese commentators	Miki Motoi
Ring announcers	Kimihiko Ozaki
Ring announcers	Makoto Abe
Referees	Kenta Sato
Referees	Marty Asami
Referees	Red Shoes Unno

Summer Struggle in Jingu featured professional wrestling matches that involve different wrestlers from pre-existing scripted feuds and storylines. Wrestlers portray villains, heroes, or less distinguishable characters in the scripted events that built tension and culminated in a wrestling match or series of matches.

On July 11, Evil defeated Kazuchika Okada to win the 2020 New Japan Cup and earn a shot at the IWGP Intercontinental and IWGP Heavyweight championships, when Gedo, Jado, Taiji Ishimori, and Yujiro Takahashi helped him win the match. Evil then called out Tetsuya Naito to celebrate the win, before turning on him and the Los Ingobernables de Japón stable, defecting to Bullet Club in the process. On July 12 at Dominion in Osaka-jo Hall, Evil defeated Naito to win both championships. On July 25 at Sengoku Lord in Nagoya, Evil defeated Hiromu Takahashi to retain the double championships. Afterwards, Naito confronted Evil, challenging him to a title match for both titles. The title match was announced on July 28.

On July 25, at Sengoku Lord in Nagoya, during a post-match interview, Kazuchika Okada teased a "controversial announcement". Three days later, during a press conference, NJPW chairman Naoki Sugabayashi alongside Kazuchika Okada announced the creation of a new title, the KOPW Championship, as well as a tournament to crown the inaugural champion. Instead of a conventional professional wrestling championship, the KOPW Championship is represented by a trophy with only one wrestler per year being recognized as the champion. At the beginning of a new year, the title is inactive, with a provisional champion being determined. At the end of the year, the winner of a final title defense is officially recognized at that year's KOPW Champion. While NJPW has historically been focused heavily on traditional matches, KOPW Championship matches focus exclusively on non-regular stipulations, with the fans voting the stipulation of the match. The tournament, which would begin on August 26, featured four first-round singles matches, where the winners would face each other in a four-way match to determine the provisional champion on August 29. On August 6, Okada and Yujiro Takahashi were announced as the first participants for the tournament. The following day, Okada and Takahashi announced their match stipulations for their match. The rest of the participants for the tournament were announced on August 10. On August 17, NJPW announced a fan vote on Twitter to decide the stipulations of the first round matches, while Sho and Sanada both agreed to face each other in a submission match. On August 24, the stipulations were decided.

== Results ==
No.	Results	Stipulations	Times
1	Yoshinobu Kanemaru defeated Master Wato (with Hiroyoshi Tenzan)	Singles match	7:31
2	Toru Yano defeated Kazuchika Okada, El Desperado and Sanada	Four-way tournament final to determine the provisional KOPW 2020	7:01
3	Minoru Suzuki defeated Shingo Takagi (c)	Singles match for the NEVER Openweight Championship	14:56
4	Taiji Ishimori defeated Hiromu Takahashi (c) by submission	Singles match for the IWGP Junior Heavyweight Championship	13:30
5	Dangerous Tekkers (Taichi and Zack Sabre Jr.) (c) defeated Golden☆Ace (Hiroshi Tanahashi and Kota Ibushi)	Tag team match for the IWGP Tag Team Championship	16:01
6	Tetsuya Naito defeated Evil (c) (with Dick Togo)	Singles match for both the IWGP Heavyweight Championship and the IWGP Intercontinental Championship	26:20
(c) / – the champion(s) heading into the match

== Inaugural KOPW 2020 tournament ==
First round
Result	Stipulation	Date	Location	Venue	Event
Kazuchika Okada defeated Yujiro Takahashi, Jado and Gedo (15:26)	Three-on-one handicap match (Note: Fans had the choice to vote for either a three-on-one handicap match (Okada's choice) or a lumberjack with leather belts match (Yujiro's choice).)	August 26, 2020	Bunkyō, Tokyo	Korakuen Hall	Summer Struggle 2020: Day 12
Sanada defeated Sho (19:37)	Submission match (Note: There was no fan vote held, as Sanada accepted Sho's submission match stipulation.)	August 26, 2020	Bunkyō, Tokyo	Korakuen Hall	Summer Struggle 2020: Day 12
Toru Yano defeated Bushi (4:44)	Two-count pinfall match (Note: Fans had the choice to vote for either a two-count pinfall match (Yano's choice) or a five-second countout match (Bushi's choice).)	August 26, 2020	Bunkyō, Tokyo	Korakuen Hall	Summer Struggle 2020: Day 12
El Desperado defeated Satoshi Kojima (14:13)	No finishers allowed match (Note: Fans had the choice to vote for either a finishers only match (Kojima's choice) or a no finishers allowed match (Desperado's choice).)	August 26, 2020	Bunkyō, Tokyo	Korakuen Hall	Summer Struggle 2020: Day 12

Final
Result	Stipulation	Date	Location	Venue	Event
Toru Yano defeated Kazuchika Okada, El Desperado and Sanada (7:01)	Four-way match	August 29, 2020	Shinjuku, Tokyo	Meiji Jingu Stadium	Summer Struggle in Jingu

== See also ==
- 2020 in professional wrestling
- List of NJPW pay-per-view events
