= Wrestle Grand Slam in MetLife Dome =

NJPW wrestling pay-per-view event in September 2021

- Promotional poster
- Promotion: New Japan Pro-Wrestling
- Date: September 4–5, 2021
- City: Tokorozawa, Japan
- Venue: MetLife Dome
- Attendance: Night 1: 2,095; Night 2: 2,780; Combined: 4,875

Event chronology
← Previous; Fighting Spirit Unleashed	Next → G1 Climax 31

Wrestle Grand Slam chronology
← Previous; Tokyo Dome	Next → —

Wrestle Grand Slam in MetLife Dome was a professional wrestling pay-per-view (PPV) event promoted by New Japan Pro-Wrestling (NJPW). It took place on September 4 and 5, 2021, at the MetLife Dome in Tokorozawa, Japan.

== Production ==
Other on-screen personnel
Role:	Name:
English Commentators	Kevin Kelly
English Commentators	Chris Charlton
English Commentators	Rocky Romero
Japanese Commentators	Shinpei Nogami
Japanese Commentators	Milano Collection A.T.
Japanese Commentators	Katsuhiko Kanazawa
Japanese Commentators	Kazuyoshi Sakai
Japanese Commentators	Togi Makabe
Japanese Commentators	Miki Motoi
Japanese Commentators	Jushin Thunder Liger
Japanese Commentators	Masahiro Chono
Ring announcers	Makoto Abe
Ring announcers	Kimihiko Ozaki
Referees	Kenta Sato
Referees	Marty Asami
Referees	Red Shoes Unno

=== Background ===
Wrestle Grand Slam was announced on March 4, 2021 as a two-day event which was originally planned take place on May 15 at Yokohama Stadium in Yokohama and May 29 in the Tokyo Dome. On May 7, NJPW postponed the event due to the state of emergency in Japan. On June 16, NJPW revealed the rescheduled date to be July 25, as well announcing that the Yokohama event would be cancelled with a two event being held at the MetLife Dome in Tokorozawa, Saitama which is scheduled to be held on September 4 and 5.

Wrestlers from NJPW's sister promotion World Wonder Ring Stardom was in pre-show matches on both days. Previously, Stardom had matches at Wrestle Kingdom 14 and Wrestle Kingdom 15; but due to NJPW and Stardom being on different broadcasting networks with TV Asahi (NJPW) and Samurai TV (Stardom), they were only dark matches. This will be the first time Stardom matches will be streamed live on New Japan World with both Japanese and English commentary.

=== Storylines ===
Wrestle Grand Slam in MetLife Dome featured professional wrestling matches that involve different wrestlers from pre-existing scripted feuds and storylines. Wrestlers portray villains, heroes, or less distinguishable characters in the scripted events that build tension and culminate in a wrestling match or series of matches.

At Wrestle Grand Slam in Tokyo Dome Robbie Eagles defeated El Desperado to win the IWGP Junior Heavyweight Championship. A returning Hiromu Takahashi challenged Eagles for the title for Wrestle Grand Slam in MetLife Dome; Takahashi vacated the title earlier in the year due to an injury.

After returning from Injury Yoh teamed with Sho to defeat Suzuki-gun's El Desperado and Yoshinobu Kanemaru for the IWGP Junior Heavyweight Tag Team Championship after this Yoh would unsuccessfully challenge El Desperado for the title at Dominion 6.6 in Osaka-jo Hall after the match Bullet Club's Taiji Ishimori and El Phantasmo would challenge them for the title. At Kizuna Road, Roppongi 3K lost the titles to Ishimori and Phantasmo. During Super Junior Tag League the pair would lose their first three matches; in their fourth match on August 16 against Suzuki-gun, Sho refused to break the submission hold that El Desperado put on Yoh and instead would leave the ring, forcing Yoh to submit. After the match, Sho attacked Yoh and said he was useless to him and also said that it was time for Yoh to retire. Thus breaking up Roppongi 3k and turning heel. Thus the two would face each other at Wrestle Grand Slam in Met Life Dome for the first time since breaking up.

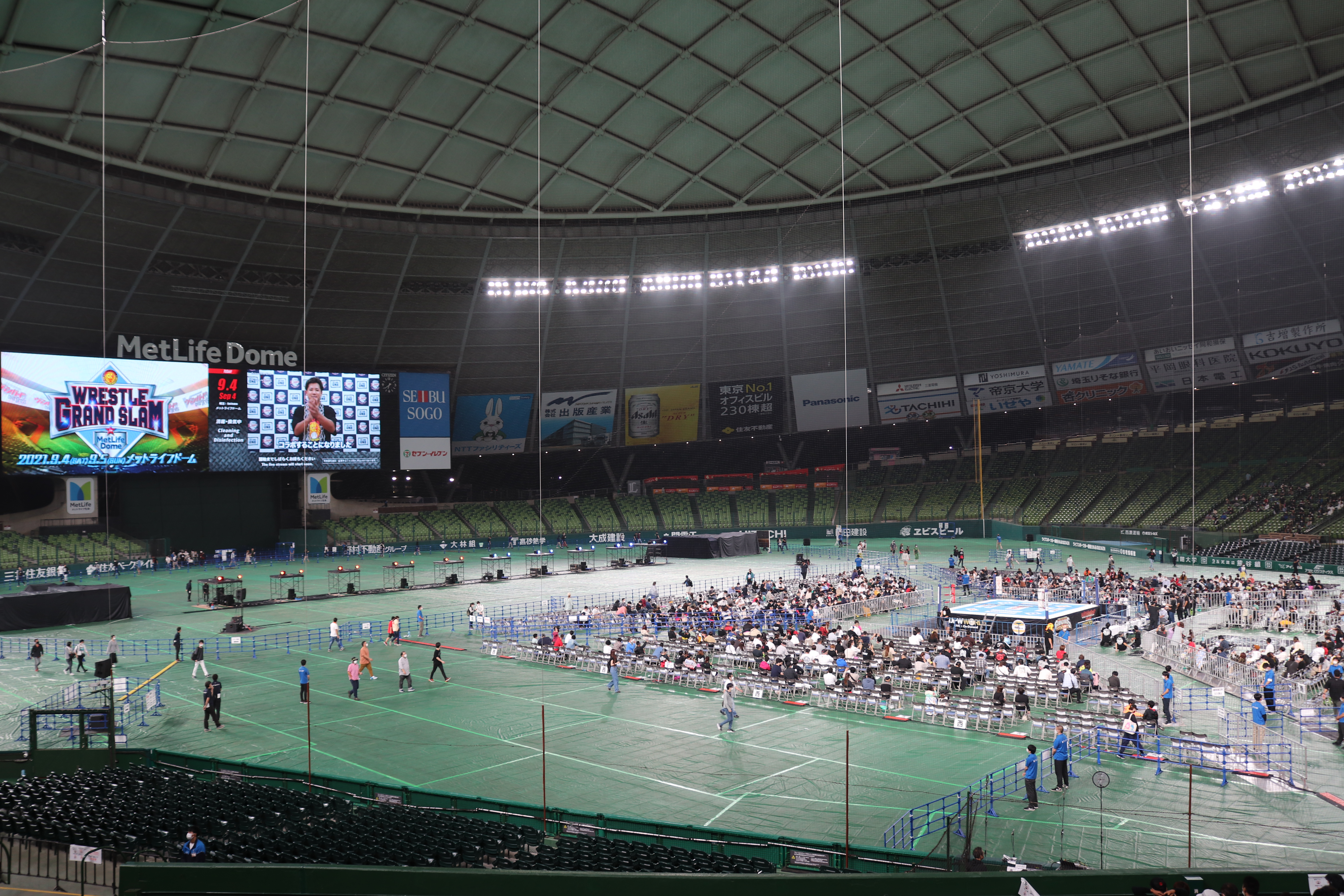
The show had a limited attendance due to in part of the COVID-19 pandemic.

At Wrestle Grand Slam in Tokyo Dome Chase Owens won the provisional KOPW 2021 Trophy in a New Japan Rambo with handcuffs match by last eliminating champion Toru Yano in the weeks following Owens would outsmart Yano by not allowing him to cheat in his usual ways but he would force Yano to say "I Quit" multiple times which Yano refused. After this a poll was conducted to decide the stipulation for the Yano vs. Owens match at Wrestle Grand Slam in Met Life Dome, Owens suggested a Texas strap match while Yano suggested a no disqualification "I quit" match with Yano winning the fan vote and thus the match was made official for the provisional KOPW 2021 Trophy.

Kazuchika Okada defeating Jeff Cobb at Wrestle Grand Slam in Tokyo Dome, afterwards Cobb would attack Okada. In the weeks leading up to the event Cobb called Okada a "young boy" and would also make fun of Okada's shortcomings against him in tag matches. The singles match was made official for night 1 of the event while on Night 2 Okada would team with Chaos stablemate Tomohiro Ishii to take on Cobb and Great-O-Khan of the United Empire.

At Resurgence Hiroshi Tanahashi would defeat Lance Archer to win the IWGP United States Heavyweight Championship, becoming first Japanese wrestler to win the title and the second Grand Slam winner. He would announce that he would like to defend his title against Kota Ibushi at Wrestle Grand Slam. The challenge was accepted by Ibushi and the match was made official for night 1 of the event.

On August 17, Suzuki-gun's El Desperado and Yoshinobu Kanemaru would defeat IWGP Junior Heavyweight Tag Team Champions Taiji Ishimori and El Phantasmo in the finals of Super Junior Tag League to earn a championship title shot at Wrestle Grand Slam.

At Wrestle Grand Slam in Tokyo Dome, Dangerous Tekkers defeated Tetsuya Naito and Sanada to win the IWGP Tag Team Championship. After the match, Naito and Sanada demanded a rematch but they were interrupted by Chaos's Hirooki Goto and Yoshi-Hashi who demanded a match for the IWGP Tag Team Championship to which the champions agreed in return Goto and Yoshi-Hashi along with Ishii defeated both Suzuki Gun's team of Dangerous Tekkers and Minoru Suzuki and Los Ingobernables de Japón's team of Naito, Sanada and Bushi to retain the NEVER Openweight 6-Man Tag Team Championship. A Three-way tag team match was set between the three teams on night 2 of Wrestle Grand Slam in MetLife Dome.

At Wrestle Grand Slam in Tokyo Dome, Shingo Takagi retained his IWGP World Heavyweight Championship against Hiroshi Tanahashi. After the match, Evil and Dick Togo attacked Takagi and challenged Takagi for his title. The match was set was for night of Wrestle Grand Slam in MetLife Dome.

== Results ==
Night 1
No.	Results	Stipulations	Times
1^{P}	Queen's Quest (Saya Kamitani and Momo Watanabe) defeated Lady C and Maika	Tag team match This was a Stardom exhibition match.	12:02
2	Team Flying Tigers (Robbie Eagles and Tiger Mask IV) defeated Los Ingobernables de Japón (Bushi and Hiromu Takahashi) by submission	Tag team match	11:40
3	Sho defeated Yoh by referee stoppage	Singles match	24:41
4	Toru Yano defeated Chase Owens (c)	No disqualification "I quit" match for the provisional KOPW 2021 Trophy	28:03
5	Jeff Cobb (with Great-O-Khan) defeated Kazuchika Okada	Singles match	27:41
6	Hiroshi Tanahashi (c) defeated Kota Ibushi	Singles match for the IWGP United States Heavyweight Championship	17:47
(c) / – the champion(s) heading into the match; P / – the match was broadcast on the pre-show

Night 2
No.	Results	Stipulations	Times
1^{P}	Donna Del Mondo (Syuri and Giulia) defeated Queen's Quest (Saya Kamitani and Momo Watanabe) by submission	Tag team match This was a Stardom exhibition match.	11:31
2	United Empire (Great-O-Khan and Jeff Cobb) defeated Chaos (Tomohiro Ishii and Kazuchika Okada)	Tag team match	12:45
3	Suzuki-gun (El Desperado and Yoshinobu Kanemaru) defeated Bullet Club's Cutest Tag Team (El Phantasmo and Taiji Ishimori) (c)	Tag team match for the IWGP Junior Heavyweight Tag Team Championship	20:28
4	Dangerous Tekkers (Taichi and Zack Sabre Jr.) (with Miho Abe) (c) defeated Chaos (Yoshi-Hashi and Hirooki Goto) and Los Ingobernables de Japón (Tetsuya Naito and Sanada)	Three-way tag team match for the IWGP Tag Team Championship	26:43
5	Robbie Eagles (c) defeated Hiromu Takahashi by submission	Singles match for the IWGP Junior Heavyweight Championship	24:07
6	Shingo Takagi (c) defeated Evil (with Dick Togo, Sho and Yujiro Takahashi)	Singles match for the IWGP World Heavyweight Championship	30:20
(c) / – the champion(s) heading into the match; P / – the match was broadcast on the pre-show

== See also ==
- 2021 in professional wrestling
