= Wrestle Grand Slam in Tokyo Dome =

2021 New Japan Pro-Wrestling event

- Promotional poster featuring several NJPW wrestlers
- Promotion: New Japan Pro-Wrestling
- Date: July 25, 2021
- City: Tokyo, Japan
- Venue: Tokyo Dome
- Attendance: 5,389

Event chronology
← Previous; Summer Struggle in Sapporo; Summer Struggle in Nagoya	Next → NJPW Resurgence

Wrestle Grand Slam chronology
← Previous; First	Next → MetLife Dome

Wrestle Grand Slam in Tokyo Dome was a professional wrestling pay-per-view (PPV) event produced by New Japan Pro-Wrestling (NJPW). The event took place on July 25, 2021, at the Tokyo Dome in Tokyo, Japan. The event was originally scheduled to take place on May 29 but was postponed to July 25 due to the state of emergency in Japan because of the COVID-19 pandemic.

The main event saw Shingo Takagi successfully defend the IWGP World Heavyweight Championship against Hiroshi Tanahashi. Other prominent matches were Los Ingobernables de Japón's Tetsuya Naito and Sanada defending the IWGP Tag Team Championship against Taichi and Zack Sabre Jr. of Dangerous Tekkers, and Kazuchika Okada faced Jeff Cobb.

== Production ==
Other on-screen personnel
Role:	Name:
English Commentators	Kevin Kelly
English Commentators	Chris Charlton
English Commentators	Rocky Romero
Japanese Commentators	Shinpei Nogami
Japanese Commentators	Milano Collection A.T.
Japanese Commentators	Katsuhiko Kanazawa
Japanese Commentators	Kazuyoshi Sakai
Japanese Commentators	Togi Makabe
Japanese Commentators	Miki Motoi
Japanese Commentators	Jushin Thunder Liger
Japanese Commentators	Masahiro Chono
Ring announcers	Makoto Abe
Ring announcers	Kimihiko Ozaki
Referees	Kenta Sato
Referees	Marty Asami
Referees	Red Shoes Unno

=== Background ===
Since June 2020, NJPW has been unable to run events with a full arena capacity due to COVID-19 restrictions. Wrestle Grand Slam was announced on March 4, 2021 as a two-day event which was originally planned take place on May 15 at Yokohama Stadium in Yokohama and May 29 in the Tokyo Dome. On May 7, NJPW postponed the event due to the state of emergency in Japan. On June 16, NJPW revealed the rescheduled date to be July 25, as well announcing that the Yokohama event would be cancelled with a two event being held at the MetLife Dome in Tokorozawa, Saitama which is scheduled to be held on September 3 and 4. NJPW stopped selling tickets for Wrestle Grand Slam in Tokyo Dome on July 11, due to the second state of state of emergency in Tokyo, although the event will still go ahead as planned.

=== Storylines ===
Wrestle Grand Slam in Tokyo Dome featured professional wrestling matches that involved different wrestlers from pre-existing scripted feuds and storylines. Wrestlers portrayed villains, heroes, or less distinguishable characters in the scripted events that built tension and culminated in a wrestling match or series of matches.

At Dominion 6.6 in Osaka-jo Hall on June 7, Shingo Takagi defeated Kazuchika Okada to win the vacant IWGP World Heavyweight Championship, and afterwards challenged Kota Ibushi to a match for the championship. On June 17, the match between the two was scheduled for Wrestle Grand Slam in Tokyo Dome. However, Ibushi was sidelined after being diagnosed with aspiration pneumonia. On the day of the event, Hiroshi Tanahashi was named as Ibushi's replacement.

The first match of the main card saw El Phantasmo & Taiji Ishimori controversially defend their IWGP Junior Heavyweight Tag Team Championship with success against Ryusuke Taguchi & Rocky Romero. In the last minute of the confrontation, Taguchi took off one of El Phantasmo's boots where it seemed like a banned item was resting. However, the referee did not notice Taguchi's remark as El Phantasmo low-blowed the latter and hit him with a CR2 to end the match.

After Shingo Takagi retained the world title over Hiroshi Tanahashi in the main event, Evil returned and laid Takagi down, as he stated that he was the next challenger for the IWGP World Heavyweight Championship.

== Results ==
No.	Results	Stipulations	Times
1^{P}	Chase Owens won by last eliminating Toru Yano (c)	22-man New Japan Ranbo with handcuffs for the provisional KOPW 2021 Trophy (Note: Eliminations can also happen when a participant is handcuffed to the ropes or at ringside.) (Note: The other participants in the match were Great-O-Khan, Tomoaki Honma, Togi Makabe, Douki, Tigers Mask, Yoshinobu Kanemaru, Minoru Suzuki, Sho, Yoh, Yuji Nagata, Satoshi Kojima, Hiroyoshi Tenzan, Bushi, Master Wato, Dick Togo, Tomohiro Ishii, Yujiro Takahashi, Yoshi-Hashi, Hirooki Goto, and Kenta.)	35:36
2	Bullet Club (El Phantasmo & Taiji Ishimori) (c) defeated The Mega Coaches (Ryusuke Taguchi & Rocky Romero)	Tag Team Match for the IWGP Junior Heavyweight Tag Team Championship	20:56
3	Robbie Eagles defeated El Desperado (c) by submission	Singles Match for the IWGP Junior Heavyweight Championship	19:56
4	Kazuchika Okada defeated Jeff Cobb	Singles Match	19:23
5	Dangerous Tekkers (Zack Sabre Jr. & Taichi) defeated Los Ingobernables de Japón (Tetsuya Naito & Sanada) (c)	Tag Team Match for the IWGP Tag Team Championship	37:58
6	Shingo Takagi (c) defeated Hiroshi Tanahashi (Note: Initially, Takagi was set to defend the title against Kota Ibushi but the latter pulled out due to not being cleared to compete.)	Singles Match for the IWGP World Heavyweight Championship	37:26
(c) / – the champion(s) heading into the match; P / – the match was broadcast on the pre-show

== See also ==
- 2021 in professional wrestling
