= Summer Struggle in Sapporo =

2021 New Japan Pro-Wrestling event

- Promotion: New Japan Pro-Wrestling
- Date: July 10–11, 2021
- City: Sapporo, Japan
- Venue: Makomanai Sekisui Heim Ice Arena
- Attendance: Night 1: 1,542; Night 2: 2,172

Event chronology
← Previous; Dominion 6.6 in Osaka-jo Hall; Kizuna Road 2021	Next → Summer Struggle in Osaka; Wrestle Grand Slam in Tokyo Dome

Summer Struggle chronology
← Previous; Summer Struggle in Jingu	Next → Summer Struggle in Osaka

Summer Struggle in Sapporo was a professional wrestling event promoted by New Japan Pro-Wrestling (NJPW). The event took place on July 10, 2021, and July 11, 2021, at Makomanai Sekisui Heim Ice Arena in Sapporo and is the second event under the Summer Struggle name and first to take place at Sapporo. This is the first NJPW event to take place at the Makomanai Sekisui Heim Ice Arena since 2011.

In the main event of night 1, Suzuki Gun's El Desperado retained IWGP Junior Heavyweight Championship against Bullet Club's Taiji Ishimori. In the main event of night 2, Sanada and Tetsuya Naito of Los Ingobernables de Japón defeated Dangerous Tekkers (Taichi and Zack Sabre Jr.) of Suzuki Gun to win the IWGP Tag Team Championship.

== Production ==
Other on-screen personnel
Role:	Name:
English Commentators	Kevin Kelly
English Commentators	Chris Charlton
English Commentators	Rocky Romero
Japanese Commentators	Shinpei Nogami
Japanese Commentators	Milano Collection A.T.
Japanese Commentators	Katsuhiko Kanazawa
Japanese Commentators	Kazuyoshi Sakai
Japanese Commentators	Togi Makabe
Japanese Commentators	Miki Motoi
Japanese Commentators	Jushin Thunder Liger
Japanese Commentators	Masahiro Chono
Ring announcers	Makoto Abe
Ring announcers	Kimihiko Ozaki
Referees	Kenta Sato
Referees	Marty Asami
Referees	Red Shoes Unno

=== Background ===
Since 2020, NJPW has unable to run events with a full arena capacity due to COVID-19 restrictions. On May 19, NJPW announced that Summer Struggle would return in 2021, taking place throughout July with shows happening in Sapporo, Osaka and Nagoya. Kota Ibushi was forced to miss both days due to suffering a fever due the side effects of getting COVID-19 vaccine shot.

=== Storylines ===
Summer Struggle in Sapporo will feature professional wrestling matches that involved different wrestlers from pre-existing scripted feuds and storylines. Wrestlers portrayed villains, heroes, or less distinguishable characters in the scripted events that built tension and culminated in a wrestling match or series of matches.

== Results ==
=== Night 1 ===
No.	Results	Stipulations	Times
1	Master Wato defeated Yuya Uemura	Singles match	9:09
2	Bullet Club (Evil and Dick Togo) defeated Chaos (Yoh and Tomohiro Ishii) by Submission	Tag team match	11:37
3	Hiroshi Tanahashi, Ryusuke Taguchi and Rocky Romero defeated Bullet Club (Yujiro Takahashi, El Phantasmo and Kenta)	Six man tag team match	15:16
4	United Empire (Jeff Cobb and Great-O-Khan) defeated Chaos (Sho and Kazuchika Okada)	Tag team match	11:45
5	Los Ingobernables de Japón (Shingo Takagi, Bushi, Sanada and Tetsuya Naito) defeated Suzuki Gun (Douki, Yoshinobu Kanemaru, Zack Sabre Jr. and Taichi)	Eight man tag team match	13:40
6	El Desperado (c) defeated Taiji Ishimori	Singles match for the IWGP Junior Heavyweight Championship	28:45
(c) / – the champion(s) heading into the match

=== Night 2 ===
No.	Results	Stipulations	Times
1	Suzuki Gun (El Desperado and Yoshinobu Kanemaru) defeated Yuya Uemura and Sho	Tag team match	12:03
2	Chaos (Tomohiro Ishii and Rocky Romero) and Ryusuke Taguchi defeated Bullet Club (Taiji Ishimori, El Phantasmo and Evil)	Six man tag team match	13:10
3	Bullet Club (Yujiro Takahashi and Kenta) defeated Hiroshi Tanahashi and Yota Tsuji	Tag team match	10:40
4	United Empire (Jeff Cobb and Great-O-Khan) defeated Chaos (Kazuchika Okada and Yoh)	Tag team match	12:40
5	Shingo Takagi defeated Master Wato	Singles match	14:50
6	Los Ingobernables de Japón (Sanada and Tetsuya Naito) defeated Dangerous Tekkers (Zack Sabre Jr. and Taichi) (c)	Tag team match for the IWGP Tag Team Championship	36:57
(c) / – the champion(s) heading into the match
