= Dominion 6.12 in Osaka-jo Hall =

2022 New Japan Pro-Wrestling event

- Promotional poster featuring Kazuchika Okada and Jay White
- Promotion: New Japan Pro-Wrestling
- Date: June 12, 2022
- City: Osaka, Japan
- Venue: Osaka-jō Hall
- Attendance: 6,068

Event chronology
← Previous; Best of the Super Jr. 29	Next → Forbidden Door

Dominion chronology
← Previous; 6.6	Next → 6.4

Dominion 6.12 in Osaka-jo Hall was a professional wrestling event promoted by New Japan Pro-Wrestling (NJPW). The event took place on June 12, 2022, in Osaka, Osaka, at the Osaka-jō Hall and is the fourteenth event under the Dominion name and eighth in a row to take place at the Osaka-jō Hall.

Ten matches were contested at the event. In the main event, Jay White defeated Kazuchika Okada to win the IWGP World Heavyweight Championship. In other prominent matches, Will Ospreay defeated Sanada to win the vacant IWGP United States Heavyweight Championship, and Hiroshi Tanahashi defeated Hirooki Goto to face Jon Moxley at AEW x NJPW: Forbidden Door for the interim AEW World Championship.

== Production ==
=== Storylines ===
Dominion 6.12 in Osaka-jo Hall featured professional wrestling matches that involved different wrestlers from pre-existing scripted feuds and storylines. Wrestlers portrayed villains, heroes, or less distinguishable characters in the scripted events that built tension and culminated in a wrestling match or series of matches.

== Results ==
No.	Results	Stipulations	Times
1	United Empire (Aaron Henare, TJP and Francesco Akira) defeated Six or Nine (Ryusuke Taguchi and Master Wato) and Hiroyoshi Tenzan by submission	Six-man tag team match	10:31
2	Bullet Club (Taiji Ishimori, El Phantasmo and Ace Austin) defeated Los Ingobernables de Japon (Tetsuya Naito, Bushi and Hiromu Takahashi) by pinfall	Six-man tag team match	8:04
3	Toru Yano defeated Doc Gallows by pinfall	Singles match	4:05
4	House of Torture (Evil, Yujiro Takahashi and Sho) (c) defeated Suzuki-gun (Zack Sabre Jr., El Desperado and Yoshinobu Kanemaru) by pinfall	Six-man tag team match for the NEVER Openweight 6-Man Tag Team Championship	9:26
5	United Empire (Great-O-Khan and Jeff Cobb) defeated Bullet Club (Bad Luck Fale and Chase Owens) (c) by pinfall	Tag team match for the IWGP Tag Team Championship	11:52
6	Hiroshi Tanahashi defeated Hirooki Goto by pinfall	Singles match to determine Jon Moxley's opponent for the interim AEW World Championship at AEW x NJPW: Forbidden Door	12:40
7	Shingo Takagi (c) defeated Taichi 11-10	10 Minute Unlimited Pinfall Scramble match for the Provisional KOPW 2022 Trophy	10:00
8	Karl Anderson (with Doc Gallows) defeated Tama Tonga (c) (with Jado) by pinfall	Singles match for the NEVER Openweight Championship	16:27
9	Will Ospreay defeated Sanada by pinfall	Singles match for the vacant IWGP United States Heavyweight Championship	12:48
10	Jay White (with Gedo) defeated Kazuchika Okada (c) by pinfall	Singles match for the IWGP World Heavyweight Championship	36:04
(c) / – the champion(s) heading into the match
