= Dominion 6.6 in Osaka-jo Hall =

2021 New Japan Pro-Wrestling event

- Promotional logo
- Promotion: New Japan Pro-Wrestling
- Date: June 7, 2021
- City: Osaka, Japan
- Venue: Osaka-jō Hall
- Attendance: 3,045

Event chronology
← Previous; Wrestling Dontaku 2021; Road to Ignition	Next → Kizuna Road 2021; Summer Struggle in Sapporo

Dominion chronology
← Previous; 2020	Next → 6.12

Dominion 6.6 in Osaka-jo Hall was a professional wrestling event promoted by New Japan Pro-Wrestling (NJPW). The event took place on June 7, 2021, in Osaka, Osaka, at the Osaka-jō Hall and is the thirteen event under the Dominion name and seventh in a row to take place at the Osaka-jō Hall.

The event was originally planned to take place on June 6, but was postponed to the following day due to the state of emergency in Japan because of the COVID-19 pandemic, although the name of the event was not changed. In the main event, Shingo Takagi defeated Kazuchika Okada to win the vacant IWGP World Heavyweight Championship. In other prominent matches, Kota Ibushi defeated Jeff Cobb, and El Desperado defeated Yoh to retain the IWGP Junior Heavyweight Championship.

== Production ==
Other on-screen personnel
Role:	Name:
English Commentators	Kevin Kelly
English Commentators	Chris Charlton
English Commentators	Rocky Romero
Japanese Commentators	Shinpei Nogami
Japanese Commentators	Milano Collection A.T.
Japanese Commentators	Katsuhiko Kanazawa
Japanese Commentators	Kazuyoshi Sakai
Japanese Commentators	Togi Makabe
Japanese Commentators	Miki Motoi
Japanese Commentators	Jushin Thunder Liger
Japanese Commentators	Masahiro Chono
Ring announcers	Makoto Abe
Ring announcers	Kimihiko Ozaki
Referees	Kenta Sato
Referees	Marty Asami
Referees	Red Shoes Unno

=== Background ===
Since 2020, NJPW has unable to run events with a full arena capacity due to COVID-19 restrictions. The event was originally scheduled to take place on June 6 but was postponed to June 7, due to the state of emergency.

=== Storylines ===
Dominion 6.6 in Osaka-jo Hall will feature professional wrestling matches that involved different wrestlers from pre-existing scripted feuds and storylines. Wrestlers portrayed villains, heroes, or less distinguishable characters in the scripted events that built tension and culminated in a wrestling match or series of matches.

On night 2 at Wrestling Dontaku, IWGP World Heavyweight Champion Will Ospreay successfully defended the title against Shingo Takagi. Ospreay was planned to defend the championship against Kazuchika Okada at Wrestle Grand Slam in the Tokyo Dome but the event was postponed due to the state of emergency. On May 20, Ospreay vacated the IWGP World Heavyweight Championship due to a neck injury. During Road to Wrestling Grand Slam both Takagi and Okada challenged for the vacant title. The match between Okada and Takagi for the vacant title was scheduled for Dominion.

== Results ==
No.	Results	Stipulations	Times
1	Bullet Club (Taiji Ishimori, Evil, Yujiro Takahashi, Chase Owens, and El Phantasmo) (with Dick Togo) defeated Chaos (Sho, Hirooki Goto, Tomohiro Ishii, Yoshi-Hashi) and Hiroshi Tanahashi	Ten-man tag team match	11:50
2	Los Ingobernables de Japón (Sanada, Tetsuya Naito and Bushi) defeated Suzuki-gun (Zack Sabre Jr., Taichi and Douki)	Six-man tag team match	11:31
3	El Desperado (c) (with Yoshinobu Kanemaru) defeated Yoh (with Sho)	Singles match for the IWGP Junior Heavyweight Championship	23:40
4	Kota Ibushi defeated Jeff Cobb (with Great-O-Khan)	Singles match	14:54
5	Shingo Takagi defeated Kazuchika Okada	Singles match for the vacant IWGP World Heavyweight Championship	36:06
(c) / – the champion(s) heading into the match
