= KOPW (professional wrestling championship) =

Japanese wrestling championship

- KOPW championship belt and trophy

Details
- Promotion: New Japan Pro-Wrestling (NJPW)
- Date established: July 28, 2020
- Date retired: January 9, 2025
Statistics
- First champion: Toru Yano
- Final champion: Great-O-Khan
- Most reigns: Toru Yano (4)
- Longest reign: Shingo Takagi (1st reign, 238 days)
- Shortest reign: Taiji Ishimori (15 days)
- Oldest champion: Minoru Suzuki (53 years, 202 days)
- Youngest champion: Yuya Uemura (29 years, 161 days)
- Heaviest champion: Toru Yano (254 lb (115 kg))
- Lightest champion: Chase Owens (205 lb (93 kg))

KOPW (an abbreviation for King of Pro-Wrestling) was an openweight championship created and promoted by the Japanese professional wrestling promotion New Japan Pro-Wrestling (NJPW).

KOPW follows a non-traditional formula: a "provisional champion" was first determined early in the year, with the provisional title being defended and potentially changing hands over the course of the year. Eventually, the provisional champion at the end of the year was officially recognized as the year's sole official champion. Furthermore, in contrast with NJPW's heavy focus on traditional matches, the title matches were exclusively focused on non-regular stipulations; each of the wrestlers involved in a title match proposes a stipulation, and fans vote to select which was followed.

The title was created by professional wrestler Kazuchika Okada, who introduced it during a press conference on July 28, 2020. Toru Yano became the first provisional champion on August 29, 2020, and the first official champion after a final title defense on December 23, 2020. Originally represented by a trophy, it later became represented by a title belt in December 2022.

== Concept ==
The title is inactive at the beginning of a new year. At some later point, a provisional champion is determined, who is not recognized by NJPW as an actual champion. During the rest of the year, the provisional champion must defend the title against contenders; if he fails, a new provisional champion is crowned, and must similarly defend the title against new contenders. At some point close to the end of the year, a final title match takes place; the winner of the match becomes recognized as that year's KOPW, and is awarded the KOPW Trophy.

While NJPW has historically focused heavily on traditional matches (either classic singles or tag team matches without special stipulations), KOPW matches will focus exclusively on non-regular stipulations such as matches with more than two individual competitors at the same time, two out of three falls matches, ladder matches, or steel cage matches. Each of the matches' participants can propose a stipulation, and the fans vote to select which stipulation the match will follow.

Despite its unique concept, KOPW is recognized as an actual championship (rather than a tournament or other non-conventional accolade) by NJPW. The name of the title changes based on the year, with the 2020 version of the title being named KOPW 2020. It is "reset" every year, and the process is repeated until a new champion is crowned.

On December 22, 2022, NJPW revealed a championship belt to replace the trophy, which had been broken and vandalized multiple times. The belt was presented to Shingo Takagi, the first provisional champion of 2023, in the New Japan Rumble on January 5, 2023, in Tokyo at New Year Dash!! 2023.

== History ==
=== Creation ===
At Sengoku Lord in Nagoya on July 25, 2020, professional wrestler Kazuchika Okada teased "a controversial announcement." On July 28, during a press conference in Tokyo, NJPW chairman Naoki Sugabayashi announced the creation of a new title following an idea by Okada; Okada then proceeded to introduce the title and its concept, also announcing KOPW 2021 for the following year. Comparing it to other NJPW titles, Okada claimed that KOPW "exists on the edge of New Japan."

=== KOPW 2020 ===
In the same conference he introduced the title, Okada announced that from August 26 onwards during the Summer Struggle tour, eight men will compete in four first-round singles matches. The four winners then competed in a four-way match to determine the inaugural provisional KOPW 2020 on August 29 at the Meiji Jingu Stadium in Tokyo, during the Summer Struggle in Jingu event.

On August 6, 2020, Okada himself and Yujiro Takahashi were announced as the first two entrants in the tournament. Eventually, the eight match-ups were announced: Okada vs. Takahashi, Toru Yano vs. Bushi, El Desperado vs. Satoshi Kojima, and Sanada vs. Sho. Fans voted for the stipulations online on the social networking service Twitter; the polls closed on August 24, with over 170,000 fan votes cast. As Sanada and Sho had both picked submission match as their wanted stipulation, no vote was needed for their match.

In the first round, El Desperado defeated Kojima by disqualification in a No finisher match, Yano defeated Bushi in a Two-count Pinfalls match, Sanada defeated Sho in their Submission match, and finally Okada defeated Takahashi, who had teamed up with Jado & Gedo, in a 1 vs 3 handicap match.

At Summer Struggle in Jingu, Yano won the four-way match by pinning Okada to become the inaugural provisional champion.

== Reigns ==
Note that this list follows the title's history, including provisional champions; however, only the person winning the final title defense of the year is actually recognized as champion.

Colors
Provisional champion
Official champion

Key
No.	Overall reign number
Reign	Reign number for the specific champion
Days	Number of days held
Defenses	Number of successful defenses

No.	Champion	Championship change			Reign statistics			Notes	Ref.
No.	Champion	Date	Event	Location	Reign	Days	Defenses	Notes	Ref.
New Japan Pro Wrestling (NJPW)
—	Toru Yano	August 29, 2020	Summer Struggle in Jingu	Tokyo, Japan	1	116	2	Defeated Kazuchika Okada, El Desperado and Sanada in a four-way match which acted as the final of an eight-man tournament to become the first provisional 2020 champion.	
1	Toru Yano	December 23, 2020	Road to Tokyo Dome	Tokyo, Japan	I	—	—	Defeated Bad Luck Fale in a Bodyslam or No Corner Pads match to become the official 2020 champion.	
—	Toru Yano	January 5, 2021	Wrestle Kingdom 15 in Tokyo Dome; Night 2	Tokyo, Japan	2	201	2	Defeated Chase Owens, Bad Luck Fale and Bushi in a four-way match to become the first provisional 2021 champion.	
—	Chase Owens	July 25, 2021	Wrestle Grand Slam in Tokyo Dome	Tokyo, Japan	1	41	0	This was a 22-man New Japan Ranbo with handcuffs.	
—	Toru Yano	September 4, 2021	Wrestle Grand Slam in MetLife Dome	Tokorozawa, Japan	3	111	2	This was a No disqualification "I quit" match.	
2	Toru Yano	December 24, 2021	Road to Tokyo Dome	Tokyo, Japan	II	—	—	Defeated Yoshinobu Kanemaru in an End of Year Party Rules match to become the official 2021 champion.	
—	Minoru Suzuki	January 5, 2022	Wrestle Kingdom 16; Night 2	Tokyo, Japan	1	46	0	Defeated Chase Owens, Cima and Toru Yano in a four-way match to become the first provisional 2022 champion.	
—	Toru Yano	February 20, 2022	New Years Golden Series; Night 4	Sapporo, Japan	4	48	0	This was a Dog Cage match.	
—	Taichi	April 9, 2022	Hyper Battle '22	Tokyo, Japan	1	16	0	This was a No-rope ring-out match.	
—	Shingo Takagi	April 25, 2022	Golden Fight Series	Hiroshima, Japan	1	238	4	This was a 30-count pinfall match.	
3	Shingo Takagi	December 19, 2022	JTO 50th Anniversary for TakaTaichi Together	Tokyo, Japan	I	—	—	Defeated Taichi in a Last Man Standing Lumberjack match to become the official 2022 champion.	
—	Shingo Takagi	January 5, 2023	New Year Dash!!	Tokyo, Japan	2	114	2	Defeated Great-O-Khan, Sho and Toru Yano in a four-way match to become the first provisional 2023 champion.	
—	Taichi	April 29, 2023	Wrestling Satsuma No Kuni	Kagoshima, Japan	2	148	0	This was a Takagi-Style Triad match.	
—	Sho	September 24, 2023	Destruction in Kobe	Kagoshima, Japan	1	54	0	This was a match where seconds were handcuffed to each other.	
—	Taichi	November 17, 2023	New Japan Road	Yamagata, Japan	3	34	1	This was a special guest referee match with Yoshinobu Kanemaru being the guest referee, with the loser of the match being banned from wrestling in Yamagata Prefecture.	
4	Taichi	December 21, 2023	Road to Tokyo Dome	Tokyo, Japan	I	—	—	Defeated Yoshinobu Kanemaru in a Whiskey Bottle Ladder match to become the official 2023 champion.	
—	Taiji Ishimori	January 5, 2024	New Year Dash!!	Tokyo, Japan	1	15	0	Defeated Great-O-Khan, Toru Yano and Yoh in a four-way match to become the first provisional 2024 champion.	
—	Great-O-Khan	January 20, 2024	The New Beginning in Nagoya	Nagoya, Japan	1	98	1	This was a Ring Fit Match.	
—	Yuya Uemura	April 27, 2024	Road to Wrestling Dontaku; Night 7	Hiroshima, Japan	1	43	0	Won 2–1; This was a Rural Revitalization in Hamamatsu two-out-of-three falls match.	
—	Great-O-Khan	June 9, 2024	Dominion 6.9 in Osaka-jo Hall	Osaka, Japan	2	196	2	This was a Storm Catch Rules match.	
5	Great-O-Khan	December 22, 2024	Road to Tokyo Dome	Tokyo, Japan	I	—	—	Defeated Taichi in a two out of three falls match to become the official 2024 champion.	
—	Vacated	December 22, 2024	Road to Tokyo Dome	Tokyo, Japan	—	—	—	Last champion Great-O-Khan announced a retirement of the title.	
—	Deactivated	January 9, 2025	—	—	—	—	—	Title officially deactivated by the International Wrestling Grand Prix committee.	

== Combined reigns ==
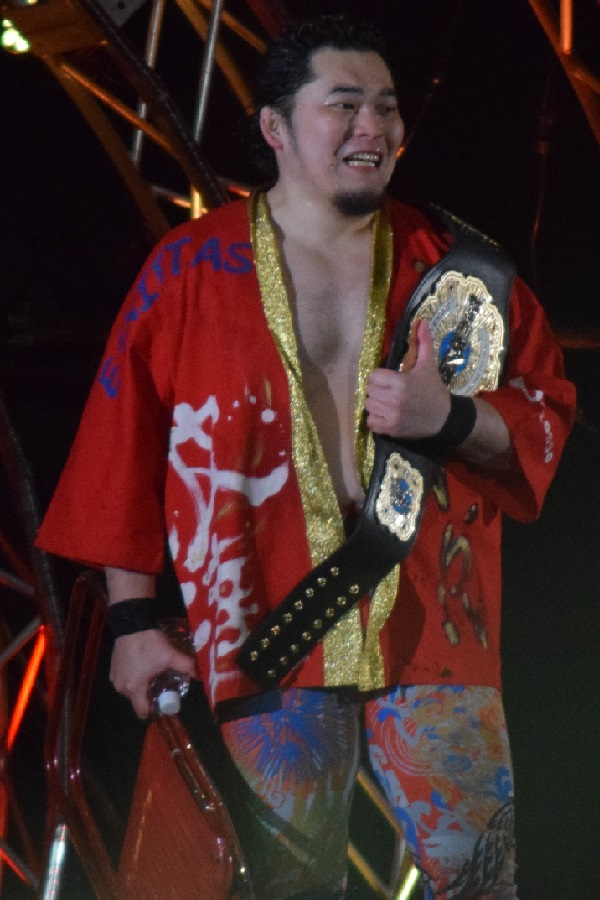
Toru Yano hold the record for most title reigns (2), most interim reigns (4) and most days as interim champion (476)

Note that this includes both provisional and official champions.

Rank	Wrestler	No. of titles	No. of int. reigns	Combined defenses	Combined days
1	Toru Yano	II	4	5	476
2	Shingo Takagi	I	2	6	352
3	Great-O-Khan	I	2	3	294
4	Taichi	I	3	1	198
5	Sho	—	1	0	54
6	Minoru Suzuki	—	1	0	46
7	Yuya Uemura	—	1	0	43
8	Chase Owens	—	1	0	41
9	Taiji Ishimori	—	1	0	15
