= Dominion in Osaka-jo Hall (2020) =

2020 New Japan Pro-Wrestling event

- Promotion: New Japan Pro-Wrestling
- Date: July 12, 2020
- City: Osaka, Japan
- Venue: Osaka-jō Hall
- Attendance: 3,898

Pay-per-view chronology
← Previous; New Japan Cup	Next → New Japan Road

Dominion chronology
← Previous; 6.9 (2019)	Next → 6.6

Dominion in Osaka-jo Hall was a professional wrestling event promoted by New Japan Pro-Wrestling (NJPW). The event took place on July 12, 2020, in Osaka, Osaka, at the Osaka-jō Hall and was the twelfth event under the Dominion name and sixth in a row that took place at the Osaka-jō Hall.

== Production ==
=== Background ===
Dominion in Osaka-jo Hall was officially announced on June 9, 2019, during Dominion 6.9 in Osaka-jo Hall. It was scheduled to take place on June 14, 2020, but was postponed to July 12, to allow the rescheduled New Japan Cup tournament to take place instead, as the tournament was originally planned to be held earlier in the year but was cancelled due to the COVID-19 pandemic. Due to the pandemic, the arena was limited to one-third capacity.

=== Storylines ===
Dominion in Osaka-jo Hall featured professional wrestling matches that involve different wrestlers from pre-existing scripted feuds and storylines. Wrestlers portray villains, heroes, or less distinguishable characters in the scripted events that built tension and culminated in a wrestling match or series of matches.

== Results ==
No.	Results	Stipulations	Times
1	Taguchi Japan (Satoshi Kojima, Yuji Nagata and Ryusuke Taguchi) defeated Great Bash Heel (Togi Makabe and Tomoaki Honma) and Gabriel Kidd by submission	Six-man tag team match	9:25
2	Los Ingobernables de Japón (Sanada, Hiromu Takahashi and Bushi) defeated Chaos (Tomohiro Ishii and Toru Yano) and Yota Tsuji by submission	Six-man tag team match	10:15
3	Suzuki-gun (El Desperado, Yoshinobu Kanemaru and Douki) defeated Hiroyoshi Tenzan, Master Wato and Yuya Uemura	Six-man tag team match	9:44
4	Bullet Club (Yujiro Takahashi and Taiji Ishimori) (with Gedo) defeated Chaos (Kazuchika Okada and Hirooki Goto)	Tag team match	9:42
5	Shingo Takagi (c) defeated Sho	Singles match for the NEVER Openweight Championship	20:07
6	Dangerous Tekkers (Taichi and Zack Sabre Jr.) defeated Golden☆Ace (Hiroshi Tanahashi and Kota Ibushi) (c)	Tag team match for the IWGP Tag Team Championship	28:43
7	Evil defeated Tetsuya Naito (c)	Singles match for both the IWGP Heavyweight Championship and the IWGP Intercontinental Championship	38:01
(c) / – the champion(s) heading into the match

== See also ==
- 2020 in professional wrestling
- List of NJPW major events
