= Minoru Suzuki =

Japanese professional wrestler and mixed martial artist

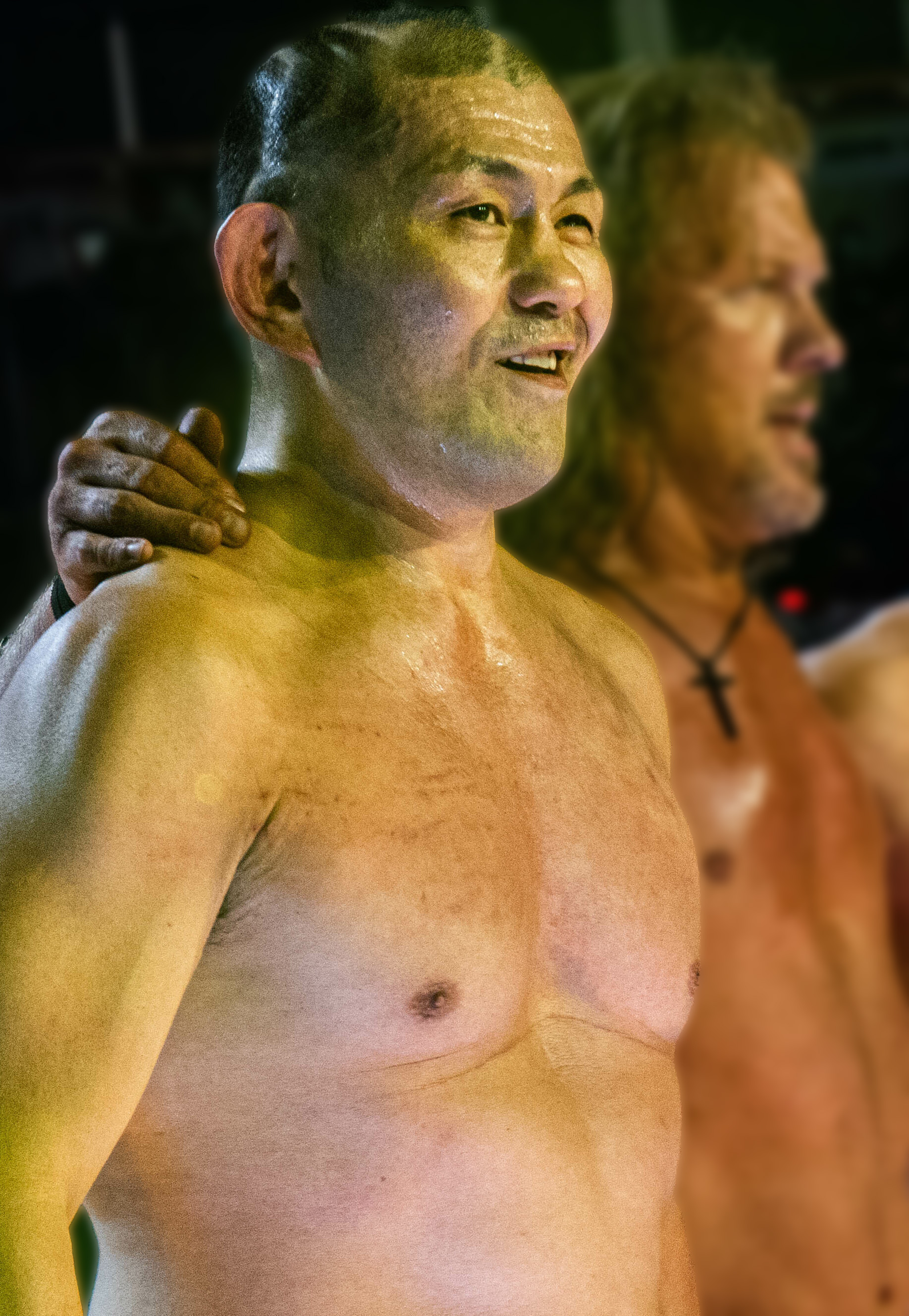
- Suzuki in 2022
- Born: June 17, 1968 (age 58); Yokohama, Kanagawa, Japan
- Nickname: "Puroresu Ō" (プロレス王, King of Pro Wrestling)
- Nationality: Japanese
- Height: 1.78 m (5 ft 10 in)
- Weight: 102 kg (225 lb)
- Division: Openweight
- Style: Wrestling
- Stance: Orthodox
- Team: Pancrase Mission
- Teachers: Karl Gotch; Kotetsu Yamamoto; NJPW Dojo; Yoshiaki Fujiwara
- Years active: 1988–1993, 2003–present (professional wrestling); 1993–2003, 2013 (MMA)

Mixed martial arts record
- Total: 50
- Wins: 30
- By knockout: 3
- By submission: 22
- By decision: 4
- By disqualification: 1
- Losses: 20
- By knockout: 8
- By submission: 7
- By decision: 5

Other information
- Website: Official blog
- Mixed martial arts record from Sherdog
- Last updated on: December 23, 2012

Minoru Suzuki (鈴木 実, Suzuki Minoru; ring name: 鈴木 みのる) (born June 17, 1968) is a Japanese professional wrestler and former mixed martial artist. Known as "Puroresu Ō" (プロレス王; "the King of Pro Wrestling"), he has worked for the largest promotions in Japan (New Japan Pro-Wrestling, All Japan Pro Wrestling, Pro Wrestling Noah and DDT Pro-Wrestling) for various parts of his career as a freelancer.

Suzuki was the co-founder of Pancrase, one of the first mixed martial arts organizations in the world. During the 1990s, he was widely considered one of the best fighters in the world and was the second King of Pancrase world champion. Suzuki returned to puroresu in 2003, when he has become a perennial top contender for all major Japanese heavyweight championships. He is also known for his time in All Japan Pro Wrestling (AJPW), where he is two-time Triple Crown Heavyweight Champion, and Pro Wrestling Noah, where he is a former GHC Heavyweight Champion and a former GHC Tag Team Champion along with Naomichi Marufuji.

A mixed martial arts pioneer, Suzuki is well noted for his catch wrestling ability, and has been praised many times by elite fighters such as Josh Barnett, Bas Rutten and Ken Shamrock for his grappling and submission skills.

== Early life & personal life ==
Suzuki trained in wrestling since high school, in part inspired by Antonio Inoki and other professional wrestlers, in part to palliate his own physical condition. He won a stateside wrestling championship in Kanagawa Prefecture, and also finished second nationwide. He has a background in kendo as well. As an amateur wrestler, Suzuki first met future professional wrestling rival Yuji Nagata. In 1986, when they both were seniors, Suzuki beat Nagata first in a Tokyo high school tournament and again at the Japanese sectionals.

Suzuki's son, Hayate Suzuki, is a professional basketball player specializing in FIBA 3x3 and streetballing.

== Professional wrestling and MMA career ==
=== Early career (1988–1993) ===
Suzuki trained at the New Japan Pro-Wrestling (NJPW) dojo and made his pro wrestling debut on June 23, 1988, losing to Takayuki Iizuka, but soon after left with catch wrestling mentor Yoshiaki Fujiwara for the newborn Universal Wrestling Federation (UWF). He joined Fujiwara's Pro Wrestling Fujiwara Gumi and had matches there and in SWS, but then left the organization to form Pancrase, one of the first mixed martial arts organizations in the world, in 1993 with Masakatsu Funaki.

=== Pancrase (1993–2003) ===
Suzuki's career in MMA originated after his departure from the Pro Wrestling Fujiwara Gumi promotion along with Masakatsu Funaki and other wrestlers to found the Pancrase promotion. He had his debut in professional fighting on the very first card of the company, facing Katsuomi Inagaki in a bout which showed Suzuki's top grappling prowess, with Minoru winning by rear naked choke in 3:25. He continued his beginnings with a victory over Lion's Den trainee Vernon White, in which Suzuki made him submit to a catch wrestling-inspired crooked headscissors.

At the third Pancrase event in November 1993, Suzuki had his debut in kickboxing rules against American champion Maurice Smith, in a rematch of a "different style fight" celebrated back in UWF where Smith defeated Suzuki. Naturally outclassed, Minoru was knocked down several times and finished shortly after. He had a third match with Smith in May 1994, this time under a special ruleset: the first and the third round would be fought wearing kickboxing gloves, the second and fourth without them and the fifth under a combination of the two. Suzuki finally got his revenge, submitting Smith at the third round with an armbar despite the disadvantage of the gloves.

Despite his significant size disadvantage against most competitors, Suzuki became one of the most successful fighters in Pancrase. He amassed a 7 fight winning streak, including a huge upset win over Pancrase's top fighter Ken Shamrock, who had already defeated Masakatsu Funaki in the first main event of the company. During the match, celebrated in January 1994, the two fighters traded positions, with Suzuki getting overpowered by the stronger Shamrock, but he was able to turn Ken over and initiate a leglock attack. The Japanese fighter locked a heel hook, which Ken looked to reverse, but at that moment Suzuki transitioned it into a kneebar and extended his leg further. Shamrock reached for a rope escape as the Pancrase ruleset stipulated, but he was gravely injured by the hold and couldn't continue, thus losing the match. However, the bout was not without controversy. Ken Shamrock would claim years after that he had been asked not to injure Suzuki during the match, as he was already affected by a back injury, and that he had accepted only to find himself deliberately injured himself by Suzuki in return.

Suzuki did not lose a match until he lost to Bas Rutten via Liver shot KO due to a knee to the body. In 1995, he won the King of Pancrase (now KOP Open-Weight) title to become the second ever King of Pancrase. Suzuki twice defeated Shamrock and is the only man to hold two wins over Shamrock in the Pancrase era. Over time, Suzuki's body became damaged and worn down from various injuries and resulted in his skills diminishing. He then decided to focus on the business and training side of Pancrase. He collaborated with the Tekken series of fighting video games as a motion actor for the character King. His last non-worked fight for Pancrase was against a professional wrestler, Jushin Thunder Liger (who replaced his original opponent, Kensuke Sasaki, due to injury), whom Suzuki had known under his real name Keiichi Yamada in his first NJPW stint. At the time he competed in grappling matches almost exclusively. Suzuki witnessed the transition Pancrase made from the so-called "hybrid wrestling" style to that of regular MMA and was instrumental in paving the way for mixed martial arts in Japan.

=== Freelancing (2003–present) ===
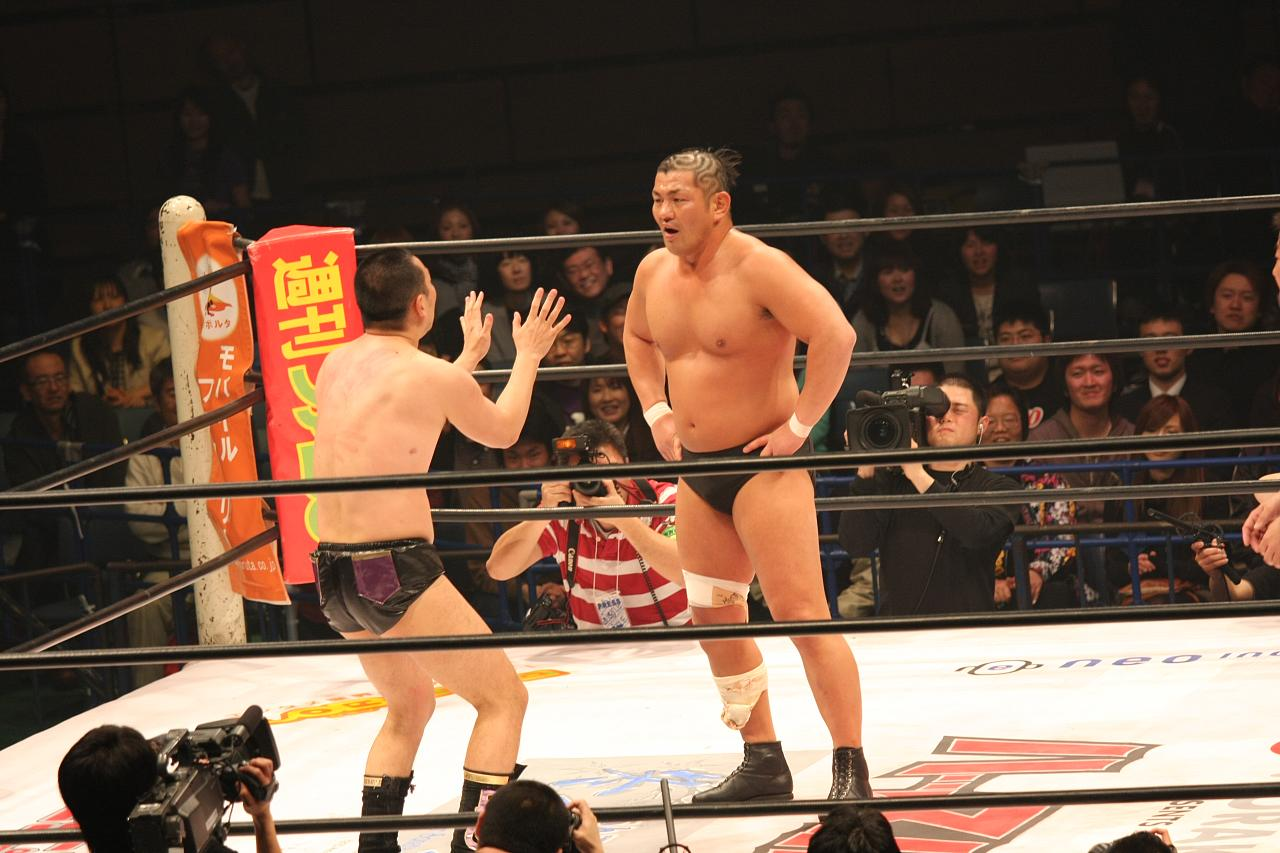
Suzuki (right) against RG (left) at a Hustle show

In 2003, Suzuki and Yusuke Fuke announced their plan to return to puroresu and invade promotions under the stable name Pancrase Mission. Suzuki began competing for NJPW as a freelancer, where he aligned himself with Yoshihiro Takayama and won the IWGP Tag Team Championship from Hiroyoshi Tenzan and Osamu Nishimura on February 1, 2004. They were stripped of the title later in the year, following Takayama's mounting injuries. In 2005, Suzuki began competing in Pro Wrestling Noah, and would receive a GHC Heavyweight Championship shot against then Champion Kenta Kobashi, but he was defeated. After this, he found an unlikely ally in Naomichi Marufuji, whose style was Lucha Libre (rather than shoot-style). Nonetheless, Suzuki taught Marufuji some of what he knew and they clicked, winning the GHC Tag Team Championship from 2 Cold Scorpio and Doug Williams on June 18, 2005. After losing the belts to Muhammad Yone and Takeshi Morishima in October, Suzuki challenged for the GHC Heavyweight Championship shot against champion Jun Akiyama on March 5, 2006, but he was once again unsuccessful.

==== All Japan Pro Wrestling (2006–2010) ====
On March 10, 2006, Suzuki made a surprise appearance in All Japan Pro Wrestling (AJPW), attacking then Triple Crown Heavyweight Champion Satoshi Kojima after he had just defended his title against The Great Muta. Suzuki participated in the 2006 Champion Carnival, and made it to the semifinals where he was eliminated by Taiyō Kea, the eventual winner. On September 3, Suzuki defeated Kea, who had won the Triple Crown from Kojima in July to become the new Triple Crown Champion. Suzuki went on to successfully defend the belts against RO'Z, Yuji Nagata, Kojima, Tajiri and Keiji Mutoh. After holding the Triple Crown for just short of a year, he lost the title to Kensuke Sasaki on August 26, 2007, at AJPW's Pro Wrestling Love in Ryogoku. At the All Japan Fan Appreciation Day on December 16, 2007, the Mexico Amigos teamed with "Ray Suzuki" and defeated Ryuji Hijikata, Kikutaro, T28 and Ryuji Yamaguchi. After the match, Ray Suzuki revealed himself as Minoru Suzuki and vowed that El Nosawa Mendoza would throw his Amigos tights away and return as Nosawa Rongai, and then kidnapped him to start early training.

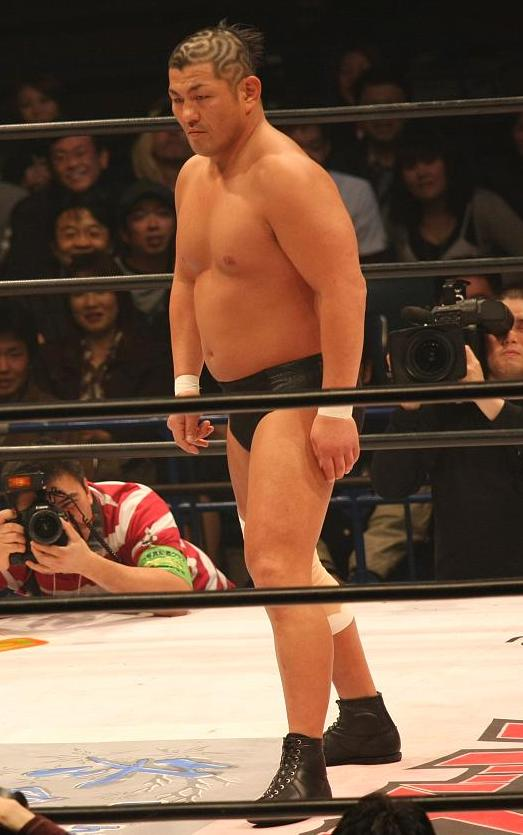
Suzuki in April 2008

On March 1, 2008, Minoru Suzuki made an appearance at the Dory Funk Jr. retirement show, providing commentary for the Triple Crown Championship main event (between Kensuke Sasaki and Satoshi Kojima), as well as pledging to participate in the upcoming Champion Carnival. From April 5 to 9, Suzuki competed in Block B of All Japan's annual Champion Carnival, finishing the league with 2 wins (over Kensuke Sasaki and Suwama) and 2 losses (to Osamu Nishimura and Joe Doering), as well as teaming with Takemura to defeat Toshiaki Kawada and Nobutaka Araya on Day 2 (April 6) of the Carnival. During the Hold Out tour, Suzuki confronted a Taiyo Kea, who was on a losing streak at the time, about joining Suzuki's stable Gurentai (alongside Nosawa, Mazada and Takemura), which resulted in Kea joining and focusing on winning the tag titles with Suzuki. On June 28, 2008, Suzuki and Kea won the World Tag Team Championship from Joe Doering and Keiji Mutoh. On September 28, 2008, he attacked The Great Muta after Muta had successfully defeated Suwama for the Triple Crown Championship, setting up a match between the two in which he lost on November 3, 2008.

On January 3, 2009, Suzuki and stablemate Nosawa Rongai won the restored All Asia Tag Team Championship, over the course of a two-day tournament. Later in the year, Suzuki won the 2009 Champion Carnival beating Kaz Hayashi in the finals. He would end up challenging the then Triple Crown Heavyweight Champion, Yoshihiro Takayama, on May 30, 2009, albeit in a losing effort. On September 23, 2009, Suzuki and NOSAWA lost the All Asia Tag Team Championship at the hands of Akebono and Ryota Hama. On January 3, 2010, Suzuki and Kea lost the World Tag Team Championship at the hands of Masakatsu Funaki and Keiji Mutoh.

On March 21, 2010, Suzuki lost to long-time rival Masakatsu Funaki in All Japan's first cage match. Suzuki then entered the Champion Carnival and won it for the second straight year, being the third man to do so by beating Funaki in the final – weeks removed from their cage match. After the final, Suzuki buried the hatchet with Funaki by shaking his hand, thus ending the decade-long rivalry. Suzuki then declared his Gurentai stable on hiatus. As a result of his Champion Carnival victory, Suzuki earned a Triple Crown Heavyweight Championship match versus Ryota Hama on May 2. In the match, Suzuki defeated Hama to claim his second Triple Crown championship. He would go on to lose the title to Suwama on August 29, 2010.

==== Consejo Mundial de Lucha Libre (2007) ====
In May 2007, he embarked on his first tour of Mexico with Consejo Mundial de Lucha Libre (CMLL) along with Takayama.

==== Return to NJPW (2010–2015) ====
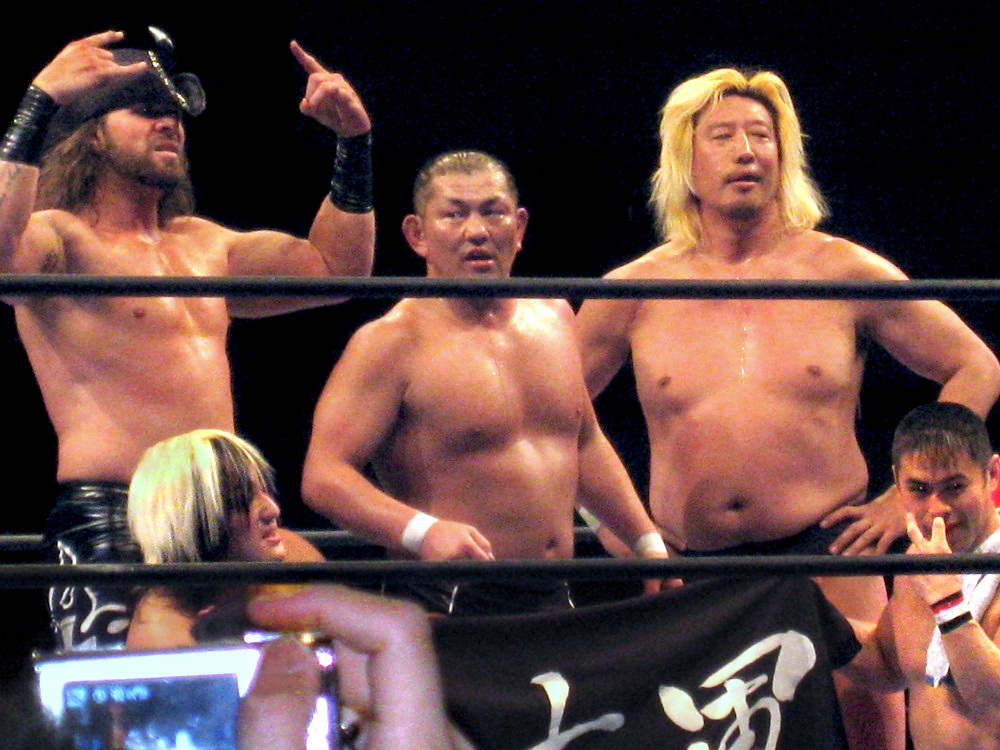
Suzuki with Suzuki-gun in February 2012

On December 12, 2010, Suzuki returned to NJPW, attacking old rival Yuji Nagata. On January 4, 2011, at Wrestle Kingdom V in Tokyo Dome, Suzuki faced Nagata in a losing effort. Suzuki made another return to New Japan on May 3, 2011, when he took over the Kojima-gun, after its members Taichi and Taka Michinoku had turned on their leader Satoshi Kojima. Later that same month, during New Japan's tour of the United States, the newly renamed Suzuki-gun was joined by Lance Archer. On July 18, Suzuki defeated Kojima in a singles match. The two had a rematch on August 1 during the first day of the 2011 G1 Climax, where Kojima managed to pick up the win. Suzuki then went on a six match win streak, but losses to Strong Man and Shinsuke Nakamura on the last two days of the tournament, caused him to narrowly miss advancing to the finals. On October 10 at Destruction '11, Suzuki defeated Kojima's number one ally, Togi Makabe, in a grudge match. In the 2011 G1 Tag League, Suzuki teamed with Lance Archer and, after four wins and one loss, the team finished second in their block, advancing to the semifinals of the tournament. On November 6, Suzuki and Archer first defeated the Chaos Top Team (Shinsuke Nakamura and Toru Yano) in the semifinals and then IWGP Tag Team Champions Bad Intentions (Giant Bernard and Karl Anderson) in the finals to win the 2011 G1 Tag League. On November 12 at Power Struggle, Suzuki and Archer failed in their attempt to capture the IWGP Tag Team Championship from Bad Intentions. After defeating Giant Bernard in a singles match on December 4, Suzuki challenged IWGP Heavyweight Champion Hiroshi Tanahashi to a title match at Wrestle Kingdom VI in Tokyo Dome. At the event on January 4, 2012, Suzuki was unsuccessful in his title challenge.

On February 12 at The New Beginning, Suzuki led Lance Archer, Taichi, Taka Michinoku and Yoshihiro Takayama of the Suzuki-gun to a dominant 5–1 win over Kushida, Tiger Mask, Togi Makabe, Wataru Inoue and Yuji Nagata in a ten-man elimination tag team match. On May 3 at Wrestling Dontaku 2012, Suzuki pinned Makabe in a tag team match, where he and Takayama faced Makabe and Yuji Nagata. The feud between Suzuki and Makabe ended on June 16 at Dominion 6.16, where Suzuki was defeated in a singles match. In August, Suzuki took part in the 2012 G1 Climax tournament, where he picked up big wins over IWGP Heavyweight Champion Hiroshi Tanahashi and former tag team partner Naomichi Marufuji, but was eliminated after losing to Yuji Nagata in his final round-robin match on August 12. On October 8 at King of Pro-Wrestling, Suzuki received a shot at the IWGP Heavyweight Championship, but was defeated by Tanahashi. The match received rave reviews, including a five-star rating from Wrestling Observer Newsletter's Dave Meltzer. From November 20 to December 1, Suzuki took part in the round-robin portion of the 2012 World Tag League, alongside Suzuki-gun's newest member Kengo Mashimo. The team finished with a record of three wins and three losses, failing to advance from their block. On January 4, 2013, at Wrestle Kingdom 7 in Tokyo Dome, Suzuki and Yuji Nagata once again reignited their old rivalry in a singles match, where Nagata was victorious. Afterwards, Suzuki led Suzuki-gun to a war with New Japan's other villainous stable, Chaos, which built to a singles match on February 10 at The New Beginning, where he defeated Kazuchika Okada. On March 11, Suzuki entered the 2013 New Japan Cup, defeating Yuji Nagata in yet another match between the old rivals. Six days later, Suzuki was eliminated from the tournament in the second round by Chaos member Toru Yano. Suzuki avenged his loss to Yano by defeating him in a rematch on April 7 at Invasion Attack and, later that same event, confronted new IWGP Heavyweight Champion Kazuchika Okada, accepting a title shot offered to him by Okada's mouthpiece, Gedo. On May 3 at Wrestling Dontaku 2013, Suzuki unsuccessfully challenged Okada for the IWGP Heavyweight Championship. Suzuki then got involved in a heated rivalry with Chaos member Tomohiro Ishii, which built to a singles match between the two on July 20 at the Kizuna Road 2013 pay-per-view, where Suzuki was victorious.

From August 1 to 11, Suzuki took part in the 2013 G1 Climax. After five wins and three losses, Suzuki went into the final day leading his block, but a loss to Toru Yano cost him a spot in the finals of the tournament. This led to a feud between Suzuki and Yano, however, Suzuki's attempt to avenge the loss led to another defeat on September 29, when he was counted out after being handcuffed to a ringside guard rail by Yano. Suzuki finally gained his revenge on Yano by defeating him on October 14 at King of Pro-Wrestling. Afterwards, Suzuki set his sights on the IWGP Intercontinental Championship, while also trying to convince champion Shinsuke Nakamura to leave Chaos and join Suzuki-gun. The match between Suzuki and Nakamura took place on November 9 at Power Struggle and saw Nakamura retain his title. From November 24 to December 7, Suzuki teamed with Suzuki-gun's newest member, Shelton X Benjamin, in the 2013 World Tag League, where they finished with a record of three wins and three losses, with a loss against Takashi Iizuka and Toru Yano on the final day costing them a spot in the semifinals. The rivalry between Suzuki and Yano led to a match on January 4, 2014, at Wrestle Kingdom 8 in Tokyo Dome, where Suzuki and Benjamin were defeated by Yano and The Great Muta, with Yano pinning Suzuki, after he was blinded by a green mist from Muta. Suzuki finally got his win over Yano on March 15 in the first round of the 2014 New Japan Cup. Suzuki eventually made it to the semifinals of the tournament, before losing to Shinsuke Nakamura. On May 25 at Back to the Yokohama Arena, Suzuki got another win over Yano, when Takashi Iizuka turned on him during a tag team match and joined Suzuki-gun. From July 21 to August 8, Suzuki took part in the 2014 G1 Climax, where he finished fourth in his block with a record of five wins and five losses. Following the tournament, Suzuki transitioned into a new rivalry with Kazushi Sakuraba, who had come to Yano's aid after Iizuka had turned on him. The rivalry culminated in a match on January 4, 2015, at Wrestle Kingdom 9 in Tokyo Dome, where Suzuki defeated Sakuraba.

==== Return to Noah (2015–2016) ====
On January 10, 2015, Suzuki made a surprise return to Noah, leading his Suzuki-gun stable to attack GHC Heavyweight Champion Naomichi Marufuji and GHC Tag Team Champions TMDK (Mikey Nicholls and Shane Haste). On March 15, Suzuki defeated Marufuji to become the new GHC Heavyweight Champion. Over the next months, Suzuki successfully defended the title against Marufuji, Maybach Taniguchi, Yoshihiro Takayama, and Takashi Sugiura. On December 23, Suzuki lost the title back to Marufuji. On November 23, 2016, Suzuki defeated Masa Kitamiya in the finals to win the 2016 Global League. On December 2, Suzuki unsuccessfully challenged Katsuhiko Nakajima for the GHC Heavyweight Championship. Three days later, it was announced that Suzuki-gun was out of Noah, concluding the invasion storyline.

==== Second return to NJPW (2017–2023) ====
The entire Suzuki-gun returned to NJPW on January 5, 2017, attacking the Chaos stable with Suzuki laying out IWGP Heavyweight Champion Kazuchika Okada. In his return match on January 27, Suzuki, Michinoku and Taichi defeated Okada, Rocky Romero and Beretta. On February 5 at The New Beginning in Sapporo, Suzuki unsuccessfully challenged Okada for the IWGP Heavyweight Championship. On April 27, Suzuki defeated Hirooki Goto to win the NEVER Openweight Championship for the first time, winning his first ever singles title in NJPW. During the following summer, Suzuki took part in the 2017 G1 Climax, where he finished with a record of four wins, four losses and one draw, wrestled against IWGP Heavyweight Champion Okada. Through a partnership between NJPW and the American Ring of Honor (ROH) promotion, Suzuki made his first appearance in the United States for 25 years on September 22, 2017, when he unsuccessfully challenged Cody for the ROH World Championship at Death Before Dishonor XV. At the following day's Ring of Honor Wrestling tapings, Suzuki teamed with the Beer City Bruiser and Silas Young to unsuccessfully challenge The Hung Bucks (Hangman Page, Matt Jackson and Nick Jackson) for the ROH World Six-Man Tag Team Championship.

On January 4, 2018, at Wrestle Kingdom 12, Suzuki lost the NEVER Openweight Championship to Hirooki Goto in a Hair vs. Hair match and had to have his head shaved bald as a result, choosing to shave his own hair in front of the live audience; his reign ended at 252 days with four successful defenses. Suzuki would quickly rebound from the loss, defeating Hiroshi Tanahashi at the New Beginning in Sapporo on January 27 to win the IWGP Intercontinental Championship. On April 29, at Wrestling Hi no Kuni in Kumamoto, Suzuki would lose the Intercontinental Championship to Tetsuya Naito. Suzuki then competed in the 2018 G1 Climax, where he finished with a record of five wins and four losses with an upset loss to Hangman Page costing him a chance to make it to the finals. between November and December 2018, Suzuki and Takashi Iizuka entered the 2018 World Tag League, where they finished with a record of 5 wins and 8 losses, failing to advance to the finals. On January 5, 2019, Suzuki and Suzuki-Gun Stablemate Zack Sabre Jr challenged newly crowned IWGP tag team champions Evil and Sanada to a match for their titles at New Beginning in Sapporo, which they were unsuccessful in doing so. Suzuki entered the 2019 New Japan Cup, where he defeated Satoshi Kojima in the first round, but was eliminated by Sanada in the second round. On August 31, 2019, Suzuki faced Kazuchika Okada at New Japan's Royal Quest event, where he lost in the main event. Suzuki and IWGP United States Champion Lance Archer entered the 2019 World Tag League, where they finished with a record of 9 wins and 6 losses, failing to advance to the finals.

At Wrestle Kingdom 14 on January 5, 2020, Suzuki confronted Jon Moxley who had just successfully retained the IWGP United States Championship against Juice Robinson and would incapacitate Moxley with the "Gotch-Style Piledriver". On January 7, a match was arranged for the United States Championship between Suzuki and Moxley at The New Beginning in Osaka on February 9, where Suzuki lost. On August 29, 2020, at Summer Struggle in Jingu, Suzuki defeated Shingo Takagi to win the NEVER Openweight Championship for a second time. From September 19 until October 13, Suzuki took part in the G1 Climax 30, finishing the tournament with a record of three wins and six losses, failing to advance to the finals of the tournament. On November 7 at Power Struggle (2020), Suzuki lost the NEVER Openweight Championship back to Shingo Takagi. At Wrestle Kingdom 15 on January 4, 2021, Suzuki competed in the New Japan Rambo, but failed to last til the final 4.

In March, Suzuki competed in the New Japan Cup, defeating Tomoaki Honma in the first round, but was eliminated by Kenta in round 2. In July at Wrestle Grand Slam in Tokyo Dome, Suzuki competed for the Provisional KOPW 2021 trophy, in a 22 Man New Japan Rambo match, but the match was won by Chase Owens. On September 25, Suzuki made his debut for NJPW's American show, NJPW Strong, defeating Fred Rosser. The following month on NJPW Strong, Suzuki reunited with Lance Archer to defeat the team of Jon Moxley and Eddie Kingston in a Philadelphia street fight. In November, Suzuki reunited with Taka Michinoku to team for the World Tag League, although the team finished bottom of the block with 0 points, failing to win a single match. On January 4, 2022, on night 1 of Wrestle Kingdom 16, Suzuki once again competed in the New Japan Rambo, this time lasting till the final 4. On Night 2, Suzuki defeated Toru Yano, Chase Owens and Cima, to win the Provisional 2022 KOPW trophy. On Night 3, Suzuki-gun lost to Pro Wrestling Noah's Sugiura-gun (Takashi Sugiura and Kazushi Sakuraba) and Toru Yano.

In February during the NJPW New Years Golden Series, Suzuki lost the Provisional KOPW 2022 trophy to Toru Yano in a Dog Cage match. The following month, Suzuki competed in the New Japan Cup, receiving a bye to the second round, but lost to Hiromu Takahashi. On April 1 at Lonestar Shootout, Suzuki defeated Killer Kross. In April at Windy City Riot, Suzuki faced Tomohiro Ishii in a losing effort. The following month at Capital Collision, Suzuki lost to Brody King. In June at AEW x NJPW: Forbidden Door, Suzuki teamed with Jericho Appreciation Society members, Chris Jericho and Sammy Guevara to defeat the team of Wheeler Yuta, Shota Umino and Eddie Kingston. In November, Suzuki teamed with Lance Archer for the 2022 World Tag League, finishing with 8 points, failing to advance to the finals. At the World Tag League and Super Junior Tag League finals, Suzuki announced that Suzuki-gun will disband at the end of 2022. The factions final match took place on December 23, where the team of Douki, Kanemaru, Sabre, and Taichi defeated Archer, Desperado, Michinoku, and Suzuki. After the match, all members spoke about their memories as a part of the group and thanked Suzuki. The night ended with all members posing with the Suzuki-gun flag, only to be interrupted by former member Takashi Iizuka, causing all nine men to pose in the ring, behind the Suzuki-gun flag. At the beginning of 2023, Suzuki formed a new trio named "Strong Style" with El Desperado and Ren Narita, quickly winning the NEVER Openweight 6-Man Tag Team Championship. After losing the titles to Hiroshi Tanahashi, Kazuchika Okada and Tomohiro Ishii in May, Strong Style feuded with the trio of Yuji Nagata, Master Wato & Shota Umino before Suzuki departed NJPW in December.

==== All Elite Wrestling (2021–2024) ====
Starting in September 2021, Suzuki spent one month in the United States, working most notably for All Elite Wrestling and Impact Wrestling. On September 5, at AEW's All Out pay-per-view event, Suzuki made his debut by confronting and attacking Jon Moxley. Both face each other in the September 8 episode of AEW Dynamite, where Suzuki was defeated. He also reunited with his former tag team partner Lance Archer. On October 15, Suzuki lost to Bryan Danielson on the AEW Rampage Buy-In pre-show.

==== Impact Wrestling (2021) ====
On the October 14, 2021 episode of Impact!, a vignette aired promoting Suzuki arriving to Impact Wrestling as part of a partnership between Impact and NJPW. Suzuki made his debut on the October 28 episode of Impact!, brawling with Josh Alexander before security pulled them apart. The following week on Impact!, Suzuki made his in-ring debut, teaming with Moose and W. Morrissey to defeat Alexander, Eddie Edwards, and Matt Cardona. Suzuki then defeated Kaleb with a K on the November 11 episode of Impact!, but lost to Alexander the following week on Impact!, in what would be his final match in the company.

==== Game Changer Wrestling (2018–present) ====
On April 5, Suzuki made his debut at Game Changer Wrestling GCW Bloodsport, defeating Matt Riddle. He would return to Bloodsport the following year to face off with Josh Barnett. Suzuki was set to return to face Orange Cassidy at their annual "Spring Break" event in 2020 until that was cancelled by the COVID-19 pandemic. Suzuki would return to GCW in 2021 having matches with Jonathan Gresham, Homicide, Joey Janela, Chris Dickinson and Nick Gage. Suzuki returned to GCW in 2022, taking on Dickinson in a rematch at Bloodsport. This time losing the match by referee stoppage, his first loss in the promotion. He would return to GCW with victories over Effy, Blake Christian, Mike Bailey and 2 Cold Scorpio.

==== Ring of Honor (2022) ====
At Ring of Honor's Supercard of Honor XV on April 1, 2022, Suzuki won the ROH World Television Championship after defeating Rhett Titus, winning his first championship in the United States. On the April 13, 2022 episode of AEW Dynamite, Suzuki's reign ended after he lost the title to Samoa Joe.

==== Major League Wrestling (2023–2025) ====
On October 14, 2023, at Slaughterhouse, Suzuki made his Major League Wrestling debut, in a winning effort against Jacob Fatu. On February 29, 2024, at Intimidation Games, Suzuki unsuccessfully challenged Satoshi Kojima for the MLW World Heavyweight Championship. On June 1, 2024, at Battle Riot VI, Suzuki joined the Contra Unit teaming with Mads Krule Krügger and Ikuro Kwon to defeat Satoshi Kojima, Matt Riddle, and Akira in a six-man tag team match. Suzuki and Kwon would then defeat CozyMax to win the MLW World Tag Team Championships at Summer of the Beasts on August 29. At One Shot on December 5, Kwon and Suzuki lost the MLW World Tag Team Championship back to CozyMax.

== Fighting style ==
Endowed with excellent wrestling ability, Suzuki was primarily a grappler on the MMA game, completing his amateur wrestling positional advancements with devastating catch wrestling submissions and hooks. He compensates his average size with a highly mobile, position-switching style of freestyle wrestling, specialized in capturing top position and flowing incessantly around his opponent in the search of an opening. Suzuki uses catch moves like headscissors, neck cranks, and nelson hold variations to force openings, which he capitalized on with sharp submissions. The only lack in his game was striking, which, as noted by Ken Shamrock, he never quite developed. Though Shamrock may look down at his striking, Suzuki is known to be able to go blow for blow with some of the toughest wrestlers in the world. He is known for his scowling face, which is usually used to strike kayfabe fear in the eyes of his opponents.

== Mixed martial arts record ==
Professional record breakdown
50 matches	30 wins	20 losses
By knockout	2	8
By submission	22	7
By decision	4	5
By disqualification	2	0

Res.	Record	Opponent	Method	Event	Date	Round	Time	Location	Notes
Win	30–20	Hans Nijman	Submission (kneebar)	U-Spirits Again	March 9, 2013	1	1:52	Tokyo, Japan	
Win	29–20	Jushin Thunder Liger	Submission (rear-naked choke)	Pancrase: Spirit 8	November 30, 2002	1	1:48	Yokohama, Japan	
Win	28–20	El Solar	DQ (groin strikes)	Deep: 4th Impact	March 30, 2002	1	2:26	Nagoya, Japan	
Win	27–20	Takaku Fuke	Submission (kneebar)	Pancrase: 2001 Anniversary Show	September 30, 2001	1	5:09	Yokohama, Japan	
Loss	26–20	Denis Kang	TKO (back injury)	Pancrase: 2000 Anniversary Show	September 24, 2000	1	3:43	Yokohama, Japan	
Win	26–19	Sean Daugherty	Submission (kimura)	Pancrase: Trans 3	April 30, 2000	1	1:01	Yokohama, Japan	
Loss	25–19	Sanae Kikuta	Technical Submission (arm-triangle choke)	Pancrase: Breakthrough 11	December 18, 1999	1	2:39	Yokohama, Japan	
Loss	25–18	Osami Shibuya	TKO (hip injury)	Pancrase: Advance 12	December 19, 1998	1	2:31	Urayasu, Japan	
Loss	25–17	Omar Bouiche	Submission (rear-naked choke)	Pancrase: Advance 10	October 26, 1998	1	0:45	Tokyo, Japan	
Loss	25–16	Kazuo Takahashi	TKO (palm strikes)	Pancrase: 1998 Anniversary Show	September 14, 1998	1	8:06	Tokyo, Japan	
Loss	25–15	Takaku Fuke	Decision (lost points)	Pancrase: Advance 8	June 21, 1998	1	10:00	Kobe, Japan	
Win	25–14	John Lober	Decision (lost points)	Pancrase: Advance 7	June 2, 1998	1	15:00	Tokyo, Japan	
Win	24–14	Tony Rojo	Decision (unanimous)	Pancrase: Advance 5	April 26, 1998	2	3:00	Yokohama, Japan	
Win	23–14	Kosei Kubota	Submission (rear-naked choke)	Pancrase: Advance 4	March 18, 1998	1	3:38	Tokyo, Japan	
Loss	22–14	Keiichiro Yamamiya	Decision (majority)	Pancrase: Advance 3	March 1, 1998	1	20:00	Kobe, Japan	
Loss	22–13	Semmy Schilt	KO (knee)	Pancrase: Advance 1	January 16, 1998	1	9:52	Tokyo, Japan	
Loss	22–12	Keiichiro Yamamiya	Decision (lost points)	Pancrase: 1997 Anniversary Show	September 6, 1997	1	20:00	Urayasu, Japan	
Win	22–11	Jagjit Singh	KO (palm strike)	Pancrase: Alive 6	June 18, 1997	1	0:21	Tokyo, Japan	
Win	21–11	Joel Sutton	Submission (keylock)	Pancrase: Alive 5	May 24, 1997	1	0:48	Kobe, Japan	
Win	20–11	Takafumi Ito	Decision (majority)	Pancrase: Truth 7	October 8, 1996	1	10:00	Nagoya, Japan	
Loss	19–11	Jason DeLucia	KO (palm strike)	Pancrase: 1996 Anniversary Show	September 7, 1996	1	4:58	Urayasu, Japan	
Loss	19–10	Vernon White	Decision (majority)	Pancrase: 1996 Neo-Blood Tournament, Round 2	July 23, 1996	1	15:00	Tokyo, Japan	
Loss	19–9	Yuki Kondo	Decision (lost points)	Pancrase: Truth 6	June 25, 1996	1	15:00	Fukuoka, Japan	
Loss	19–8	Guy Mezger	TKO (palm strikes)	Pancrase: Truth 5	May 16, 1996	1	7:59	Tokyo, Japan	
Win	19–7	Takaku Fuke	Submission (armbar)	Pancrase: Truth 2	March 2, 1996	1	4:15	Kobe, Japan	
Loss	18–7	Frank Shamrock	Submission (kneebar)	Pancrase: Truth 1	January 28, 1996	1	22:53	Yokohama, Japan	For the interim Pancrase Openweight Championship.
Win	18–6	Guy Mezger	DQ (groin strike)	Pancrase: Eyes of Beast 7	December 14, 1995	1	7:15	Sapporo, Japan	
Win	17–6	Todd Medina	Submission (armbar)	Pancrase: Eyes of Beast 6	November 4, 1995	1	1:39	Yokohama, Japan	
Loss	16–6	Bas Rutten	Submission (guillotine choke)	Pancrase: 1995 Anniversary Show	September 1, 1995	1	15:35	Tokyo, Japan	Lost the Pancrase Openweight Championship.
Win	16–5	Jason DeLucia	Submission (guillotine choke)	Pancrase: 1995 Neo-Blood Tournament Opening Round	July 22, 1995	1	9:23	Tokyo, Japan	
Win	15–5	Larry Papadopoulos	Submission (guillotine choke)	Pancrase: Eyes of Beast 5	June 13, 1995	1	8:34	Sapporo, Japan	
Win	14–5	Ken Shamrock	Submission (kneebar)	Pancrase: Eyes of Beast 4	May 13, 1995	1	2:14	Urayasu, Japan	Won the Pancrase Openweight Championship.
Loss	13–5	Frank Shamrock	Submission (rear-naked choke)	Pancrase: Eyes of Beast 3	April 8, 1995	1	3:23	Nagoya, Japan	
Win	13–4	Christopher DeWeaver	Submission (heel hook)	BMSWP: Dome Spring Full Bloom	April 2, 1995	1	1:50	Tokyo, Japan	
Win	12–4	Gregory Smit	Submission (rear-naked choke)	Pancrase: Eyes of Beast 2	March 10, 1995	1	9:10	Yokohama, Japan	
Loss	11–4	Manabu Yamada	Submission (armbar)	Pancrase: King of Pancrase Tournament Second Round	December 17, 1994	1	14:46	Tokyo, Japan	
Win	11–3	Jason DeLucia	Submission (heel hook)	Pancrase: King of Pancrase Tournament Opening Round	December 16, 1994	1	2:04	Tokyo, Japan	
Win	10–3	Matt Hume	Decision (lost points)	Pancrase: King of Pancrase Tournament Opening Round	December 16, 1994	1	10:00	Tokyo, Japan	
Loss	9–3	Masakatsu Funaki	Technical submission (rear-naked choke)	Pancrase: Road to the Championship 5	October 15, 1994	1	1:51	Tokyo, Japan	
Win	9–2	Todd Bjornethun	Submission (armbar)	Pancrase: Road to the Championship 4	September 1, 1994	1	3:11	Osaka, Japan	
Win	8–2	Remco Pardoel	KO (palm strike)	Pancrase: Road to the Championship 3	July 26, 1994	1	7:16	Tokyo, Japan	
Loss	7–2	Bas Rutten	KO (knee to the body)	Pancrase: Road to the Championship 2	July 6, 1994	1	3:43	Amagasaki, Japan	
Win	7–1	Maurice Smith	Submission (armbar)	Pancrase: Road to the Championship 1	May 31, 1994	3	0:36	Tokyo, Japan	
Win	6–1	Thomas Puckett	Submission (armbar)	Pancrase: Pancrash! 3	April 21, 1994	1	1:43	Osaka, Japan	
Win	5–1	Takaku Fuke	Submission (bulldog choke)	Pancrase: Pancrash! 2	March 12, 1994	1	6:31	Nagoya, Japan	
Win	4–1	Ken Shamrock	Submission (kneebar)	Pancrase: Pancrash! 1	January 19, 1994	1	7:37	Yokohama, Japan	
Win	3–1	James Mathews	Submission (keylock)	Pancrase: Yes, We Are Hybrid Wrestlers 4	December 8, 1993	1	0:58	Hakata, Japan	
Win	2–1	Vernon White	Submission (leg scissor choke)	Pancrase: Yes, We Are Hybrid Wrestlers 2	October 14, 1993	1	2:36	Nagoya, Japan	
Win	1–1	Katsuomi Inagaki	Submission (rear-naked choke)	Pancrase: Yes, We Are Hybrid Wrestlers 1	September 21, 1993	1	3:25	Urayasu, Japan	
Loss	0–1	Maurice Smith	KO (punch)	UWF U-Cosmos	November 29, 1989	4	1:05	Tokyo, Japan	

=== Mixed martial arts exhibition ===
Exhibition record breakdown		
1 match	0 wins	0 losses
By knockout	0	0
By submission	0	0
By decision	0	0
Draws	1	

Res.	Record	Opponent	Method	Event	Date	Round	Time	Location	Notes
Draw	0-0-1	Yuki Kondo	Technical Draw	Pancrase 2000 Trans Tour	April 12, 2001	1	3:00	Tokyo, Japan	

=== Mixed rules ===
Professional record breakdown
1 match	1 win	0 losses
By knockout	0	0
By submission	1	0
By decision	0	0

Res.	Record	Opponent	Method	Event	Date	Round	Time	Location	Notes
Win	1–0	Lawi Nabataya	Submission (armbar)	PWFG Hataage Dai-yonsen	August 23, 1991	1	N/A	Tokyo, Japan	

== Kickboxing record ==
Kickboxing record
0 wins (0 KOs), 1 loss
Date	Result	Opponent	Event	Location	Method	Round	Time	Record
November 8, 1993	Loss	(United States) Maurice Smith	Pancrase: Yes, We Are Hybrid Wrestlers 3	Kobe, Hyogo, Japan	KO (right punch)	1	2:36	0-1
Legend: Win Loss Draw/No contest

== Submission grappling record ==
Result	Opponent	Method	Event	Date	Round	Time	Notes
Win	(Japan) Takashi Iizuka	Decision (unanimous)	Pancrase: 10th Anniversary Show	August 31, 2003	2	5:00	Catch wrestling rules
Win	(Japan) Caol Uno and (Japan) Osami Shibuya	Submission	The Contenders X-Rage Vol.2	October 3, 2002	1	14:39	Partnered with (Japan) Tsuyoshi Kohsaka
Win	(Japan) Katsuomi Inagaki	Decision (unanimous)	Pancrase: 2002 Spirit Tour	February 17, 2002	2	5:00	Catch wrestling rules
Draw	(Japan) Sanae Kikuta and (Japan) Takeshi Yamazaki	Draw	The Contenders X-Rage Vol.1	December 14, 2001	1	10:00	Partnered with (Japan) Daiju Takase
Draw	(Japan) Caol Uno and (Japan) Daiju Takase	Draw	The Contenders 5 Prospective M-1	October 6, 2001	1	10:00	Partnered with (Japan) Takafumi Ito
Draw	(Japan) Keiichiro Yamamiya	Draw	Pancrase: Proof 5	August 25, 2001	1	5:00	Catch wrestling rules
Draw	(Japan) Eiji Ishikawa	Draw	Pancrase: Proof 4	June 26, 2001	1	5:00	Catch wrestling rules
Win	(Japan) Junichi Yanai	Submission (kneebar)	Pancrase: Proof 3	May 13, 2001	1	2:46	Catch wrestling rules
Loss	(United States) Jason DeLucia	Submission (triangle choke)	Pancrase: Proof 1	February 4, 2001	1	2:49	Catch wrestling rules
Win	(Japan) Takafumi Ito	Decision (unanimous)	Pancrase: Trans Tour	September 12, 2001	1	5:00	Catch wrestling rules

== Championships and accomplishments ==
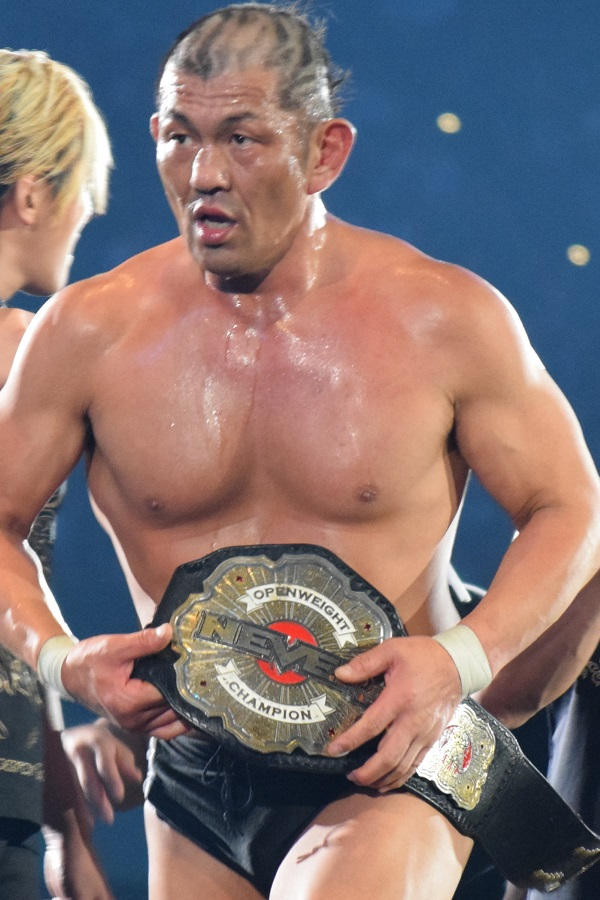
Suzuki is a two-time NEVER Openweight Champion.

=== Professional wrestling ===
- All Japan Pro Wrestling
  - All Asia Tag Team Championship (1 time) – with Nosawa Rongai
  - Triple Crown Heavyweight Championship (2 times)
  - World Tag Team Championship (1 time) – with Taiyō Kea
  - All Asia Tag Team Championship Tournament (2009)
  - Champion Carnival (2009, 2010)
  - Kokomi Sakura Cup (2010)
- DDT Pro-Wrestling
  - DDT Universal Championship (1 time)
  - Ironman Heavymetalweight Championship (1 time)
- Professional Wrestling Just Tap Out
  - JTO Tag Team Championship (1 time) – with Genta Yubari
- Major League Wrestling
  - MLW World Tag Team Championship (1 time) – with Ikuro Kwon
- New Japan Pro-Wrestling
  - IWGP Intercontinental Championship (1 time)
  - IWGP Tag Team Championship (1 time) – with Yoshihiro Takayama
  - NEVER Openweight Championship (2 times)
  - NEVER Openweight 6-Man Tag Team Championship (1 time) – with El Desperado and Ren Narita
  - KOPW Provisional Championship (1 time)
  - G1 Tag League (2011) – with Lance Archer
- Nikkan Sports
  - Match of the Year Award (2010) vs. Masakatsu Funaki on March 21
  - Outstanding Performance Award (2011)
  - Fighting Spirit Award (2006)
  - Technique Award (2004, 2005)
- Pro Wrestling Illustrated
  - Ranked No. 14 of the top 500 singles wrestlers in the PWI 500 in 2007
- Pro Wrestling Noah
  - GHC Heavyweight Championship (1 time)
  - GHC Tag Team Championship (1 time) – with Naomichi Marufuji
  - Global League (2016)
- Revolution Pro Wrestling
  - British Heavyweight Championship (1 time)
  - Undisputed British Tag Team Championship (1 time) – with Zack Sabre Jr.
- Ring of Honor
  - ROH World Television Championship (1 time)
- Tenryu Project
  - Tenryu Project World 6-Man Tag Team Championship (1 time) — with Yasshi and Kengo
- Tokyo Sports
  - Best Tag Team Award (2004) with Yoshihiro Takayama
  - Best Tag Team Award (2008) with Taiyō Kea
  - MVP Award (2006)
  - Outstanding Performance Award (2015)
  - Technique Award (2004)
- Pro Wrestling Up Town
  - Up Town Championship (1 time, inaugural)
  - Magic X (2025)
- Wrestling Observer Newsletter
  - Match of the Year (2012) vs. Hiroshi Tanahashi on October 8
  - Match of the Year (2014) vs. A.J. Styles on August 1
  - Wrestling Observer Newsletter Hall of Fame (Class of 2017)

=== Mixed martial arts ===
- Pancrase
  - King of Pancrase Openweight Championship (1 time)

== Luchas de Apuestas record ==
Winner (wager)	Loser (wager)	Location	Event	Date	Notes
Hirooki Goto (hair)	Minoru Suzuki (hair and championship)	Tokyo, Japan	Wrestle Kingdom 12	January 4, 2018	

== See also ==
- List of professional wrestlers by MMA record

Achievements
Preceded by Yuji Nagata & Wataru Inoue	G1 Tag League winner 2011; With: Lance Archer	Succeeded by Hirooki Goto & Karl Anderson (World Tag League)
