= Chase Owens =

American professional wrestler

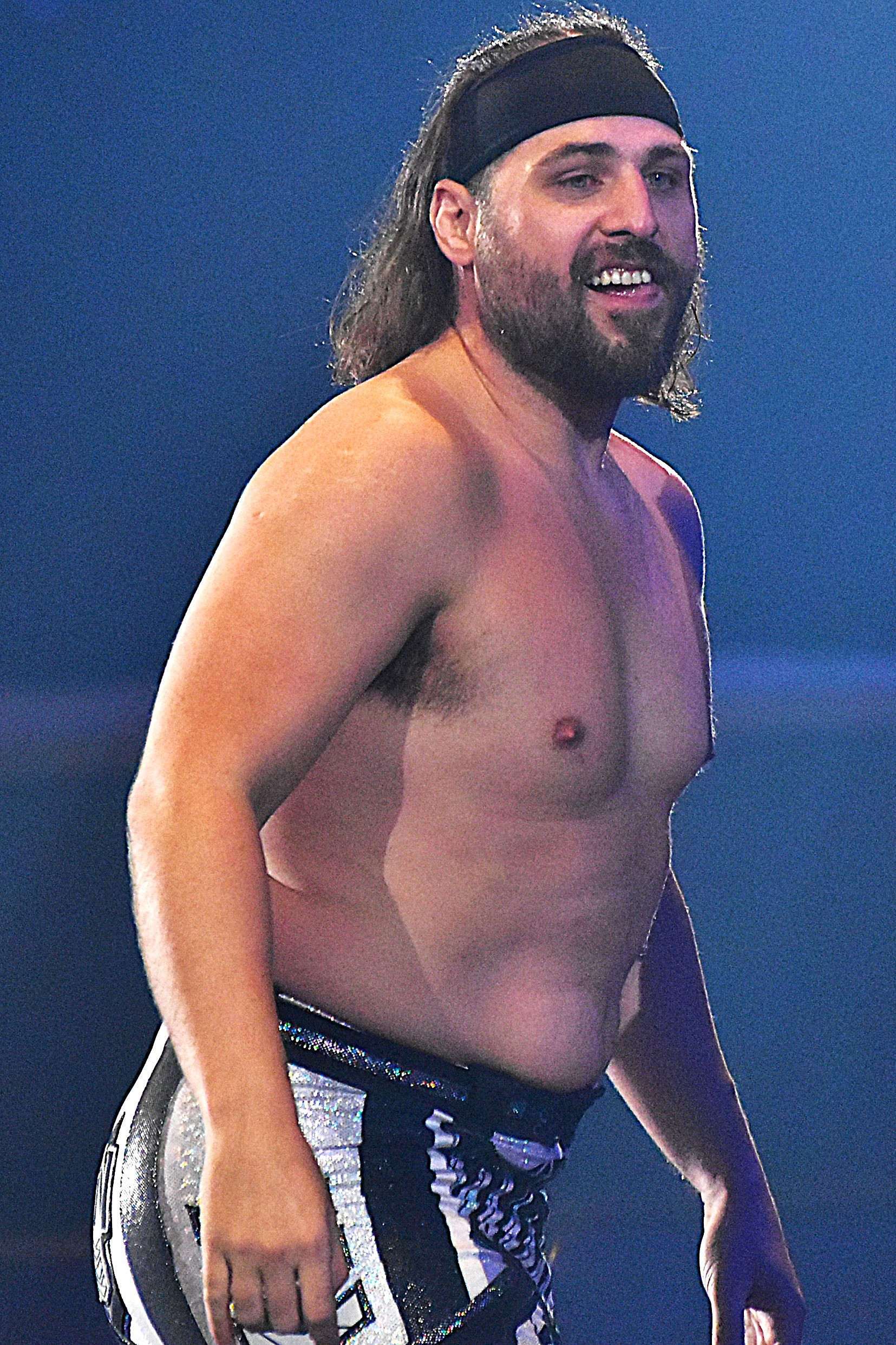
- Owens in 2025

Personal information
- Born: Steven Owens; March 7, 1990 (age 36) Bristol, Tennessee, U.S.

Professional wrestling career
- Ring name(s): Chase Owens; Kevin Bendl
- Billed height: 1.85 m (6 ft 1 in)
- Billed weight: 93 kg (205 lb)
- Billed from: Tennessee
- Trained by: Ricky Morton
- Debut: 2007

Steven Owens (born March 7, 1990), better known by his ring name Chase Owens, (Note: When wrestling for New Japan Pro-Wrestling, his ring name is written in katakana as チェーズ・オーエンズ (Chēzu Ōenzu).) is an American professional wrestler. He is signed to New Japan Pro-Wrestling (NJPW), where he is a member of House of Torture. Owens is a three-time IWGP Tag Team Champion, having won the belts twice with Kenta and once with Bad Luck Fale. He has also won the provisional KOPW trophy once. For much of his tenure in NJPW, Owens has been a member of Bullet Club, but was also briefly affiliated with the stable's sub-groups the War Dogs and The Elite.

== Professional wrestling career ==
=== Independent circuit (2007–2019) ===
Owens made his debut for Championship Wrestling Alliance (CWA) on February 17, 2007, at the age of 16, where he was defeated by Tony Givens. Owens participated in the 2007 CWA Best of the Best tournament, but he was defeated in the first round by The Jin. On November 14, 2008, Owens competed in his first title match, but was defeated by the defending AWA World Heavyweight Champion Tony Givens. He participated in the 2009 and 2010 editions of the CWA Best of the Best tournament, but was unsuccessful, with Robbie Cassidy winning in 2009 and Alyx Winters winning in 2010, respectively.

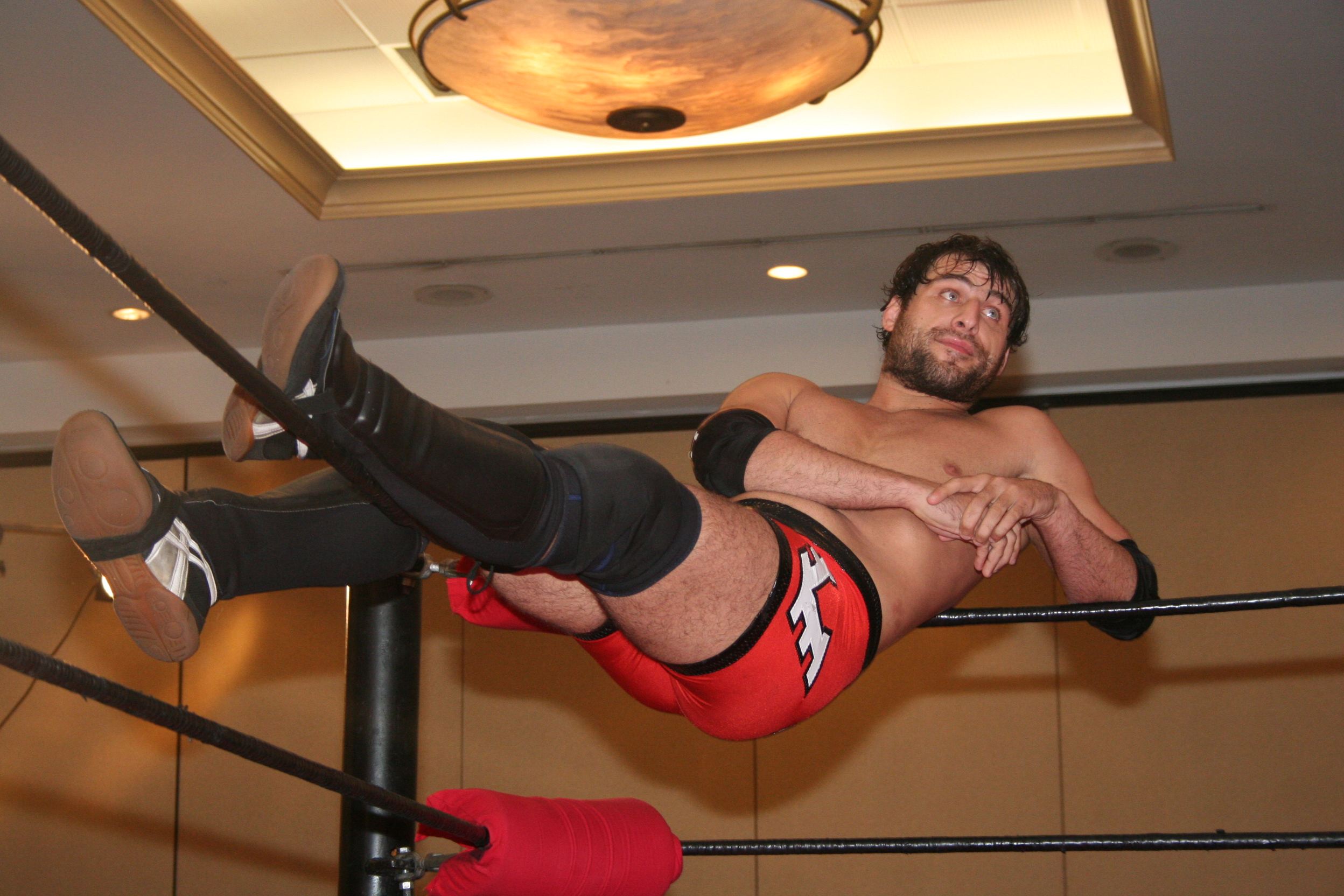
Owens lying across the top rope prior to a match in 2014

On February 26, 2011, Owens defeated Sigmon to win his first title, the Mid-Atlantic Championship Wrestling (MACW) Junior Heavyweight Championship. The following month, he defeated Jason Kincaid in a ladder match to win the NWA Mountain Empire Championship. On April 1, Owens participated in the 2011 Smoky Mountain Cup tournament. He won the tournament by defeating Alyx Winters, Chance Prophet, Jason Kincaid, Jeff Connelly, and Menace in the finals. On August 27, Owens competed in the Chikara Young Lions Cup IX tournament, but he was defeated by Jakob Hammermeier in a first-round four-way elimination match that also included Gregory Iron and Obariyon. On October 7, Owens participated in a tournament for the vacant NWA World Junior Heavyweight Championship. He defeated Steve Walters in the first round, Scorpio Sky in the second round, but was defeated in the finals by Kevin Douglas.

In July 2014, Owens made his debut for Canadian Wrestling's Elite (CWE). He defended the NWA World Junior Heavyweight Championship on each day of the tour between July 17–27. On April 24, 2015, Owens returned to the promotion and was defeated by Jason Kincaid in the first round of the 2015 Elite 8 tournament. Two years later, Owens would win the 2017 Elite 8 tournament, defeating Kaito Kiyomiya in his first round match, Mentallo in the second round, and Shane Sabre in the finals.

On February 11, 2017, Owens defeated Jason Kincaid to win the NWA Southeastern Heavyweight Championship, ending Kincaid's historic reign of 1,951 days. The championship was retired on August 19.

On June 16, 2018, Chase defeated his trainer and mentor Ricky Morton on a Battle On The Border (BOTB) show. 6 months later he would win their Heavyweight Championship from Hooks in a Steel Cage match, before losing it to Brandon Xavier the next night.

In 2019, Chase started wrestling less dates for independent promotions as he signed with New Japan Pro-Wrestling full-time. In 2020, he returned to MACW for the first time in 4 years, in a losing effort against Billy Gunn on 18 January.

=== WWE (2012) ===
On the May 25, 2012, episode of SmackDown, Owens under the name Kevin Bendl teamed with Brian Edwards in his only WWE appearance in a handicap match against Ryback. The duo would lose the match.

=== New Japan Pro-Wrestling (2014–present) ===
==== Beginnings (2014–2015) ====
On October 13, 2014, Owens made his debut for New Japan Pro-Wrestling (NJPW) at King of Pro-Wrestling, successfully defending the NWA World Junior Heavyweight Championship against Bushi. After the match, Owens challenged Jushin Thunder Liger. On November 8 at Power Struggle, Owens lost the title to Liger. Owens returned to NJPW on February 11, 2015, at The New Beginning in Osaka, where he and Rob Conway defeated Liger and Hiroyoshi Tenzan in a tag team match. Three days later at The New Beginning in Sendai, Owens unsuccessfully challenged Liger for the NWA World Junior Heavyweight Championship. Owens returned to NJPW in May to take part in the 2015 Best of the Super Juniors tournament. He finished the tournament with a record of four wins and three losses, failing to advance to the finals.

==== Bullet Club (2015–2025) ====
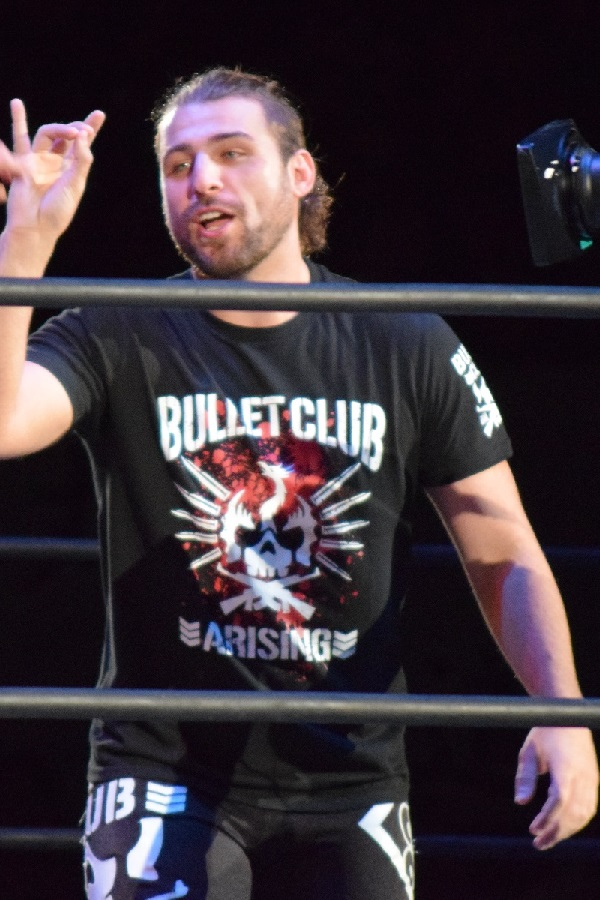
Owens during his Bullet Club affiliation in 2016

On October 23, 2015, Owens joined Bullet Club. The following day, Owens and new stablemate Kenny Omega entered the 2015 Super Jr. Tag Tournament, but were eliminated in their first round match by Roppongi Vice (Beretta and Rocky Romero). In May 2016, Owens appeared in NJPW as a late replacement for an injured Nick Jackson in the 2016 Best of the Super Juniors tournament. He finished second to last in his block with a record of three wins and four losses. At the end of the year, Owens took part in the 2016 World Tag League, teaming with Bullet Club leader Kenny Omega. The two finished second to last in their block with a record of three wins and four losses. Around this time, Owens was quietly promoted to the promotion's heavyweight division.

Owens participated in the 2017 World Tag League, teaming with Bad Luck Fale, the duo finished with a record of three wins and four losses, failing to advance form their block. On April 1, 2018, at Sakura Genesis, Owens teamed with Yujiro Takahashi to unsuccessfully challenge the Young Bucks (Matt Jackson and Nick Jackson). At the G1 Special in San Francisco show, Owens teamed with his Bullet Club stablemates to defeat the team of Chaos, later that night he sided with The Elite after being attacked by the Guerrillas Of Destiny and Haku. Chase would spend the rest of the year sided with the 'Elite' group, suffering many pinfall losses.

At January 2019, Owens along with Yujiro Takahashi rejoined the Bullet Club at NJPW New Year Dash!!. He announced that he had signed a contract with New Japan, making it the first time he was full-time with the company. He would start this year off well, achieving many pinfall victories, albeit over weaker opposition. In March 2019, Owens entered the New Japan Cup, defeating the IWGP United States Champion Juice Robinson in the first round but losing to Yoshi-Hashi in the second round. On March 23, 2019, at the New Japan Cup finals, Owens unsuccessfully challenged Juice Robinson for the IWGP United States Championship. On June 16, Owens teamed with Bullet Club stablemates Yujiro Takahashi and El Phantasmo to unsuccessfully challenge Ryusuke Taguchi, Togi Makabe and Toru Yano for the NEVER Openweight 6-Man Tag Team Championship. Owens participated in the 2019 World Tag League teaming again with Bad Luck Fale, the duo finished with a record of six wins and nine losses failing to advance to the final round.

After a six-month layoff due to the COVID-19 pandemic, Chase returned to NJPW on the debut episode of Strong on August 7, losing to David Finlay in the first round of the New Japan Cup USA. He returned to Japan on November 1 as part of the Road To Power Struggle tour. In the 2020 World Tag League, Owens teamed with Fale again, finishing with a record of three wins and six losses and failed to advance to the finals.

On January 4, 2021, at Wrestle Kingdom 15, Owens participated in the New Japan Rambo, entering first and making it to the final four, thus qualifying for a match at night 2 for the Provisional KOPW 2021 Trophy. The following day, he was defeated by Toru Yano in a fatal 4-way that also included Bushi and Bad Luck Fale. One night later, at New Year Dash!!, Owens expressed his desire to challenge Yano for the trophy. At Castle Attack, on February 27, Owen's unsuccessfully challenged Yano for the Provisional KOPW YTR Style Texas Strap match. At Wrestle Grand Slam in Tokyo Dome, Owens won the Provisional KOPW after last eliminating Yano in the New Japan Rambo. He lost the Provisional KOPW back to Yano in a no disqualification match "I quit" match at Wrestle Grand Slam in MetLife Dome. Owens entered into the 2021 G1 Climax, his first G1 Climax tournament, and scored a shock victory over Hiroshi Tanahashi on October 4. Owens scored only one more victory in the tournament, finishing last in the B Block with four points. For the fourth year in a row, Owens and Fale teamed with 2021 World Tag League; they scored six victories for twelve points and missed the finals.

At Wrestle Kingdom 16 Owens made the final four in the New Japan Rambo for the second year in a row on January 4. The following day, in a four-way match for the Provisional KOPW 2022 Trophy, he lost to Minoru Suzuki. At Wrestling Dontaku 2022, Fale and Chase Owens won the IWGP Tag Team Championship in a three-way tag team match. They lost the titles on June 12, at Dominion 6.12 in Osaka-jo Hall. Also at the event Owens was announced to be participating in the G1 Climax 32 tournament in July, where he would compete in the B block. He finished with 4 points, therefore failing to advance to the semi-finals. In November Owens teamed with Bad Luck Fale in the 2022 World Tag League tournament. Mid-way through the tournament, it was announced that Owens would be absent for the remainder of the tournament, following the passing of a family member, causing the duo to forfeit the remainder of the tournament, thus ending their tournament campaign with 4 points.

In May of the following year, Owens participated in the New Japan Cup, receiving a bye to the second round, where he was defeated by Tetsuya Naito. In July, Owens participated in 2023 G1 Climax, where he'd be placed in the A Block. Owens finished bottom of the block with 4 points, eliminating from the tournament.

On January 5, 2024 at New Year Dash!!, Owens came forward to challenge recently crowned IWGP Tag Team Champions and Strong Openweight Tag Team Champions to a match the Guerrillas of Destiny (El Phantasmo and Hikuleo) to a match with his partner being Kenta, which they accepted. After Owens and Kenta unsuccessfully challenged Phantasmo and Hikuleo for the Strong Openweight Tag Team Championship on February 4 at The New Beginning in Nagoya, Guerrillas of Destiny decided to defend the IWGP Tag Team Championship against them at The New Beginning in Osaka.

On the second night of the 2025 New Japan Cup, Owens joined the War Dogs sub-group of Bullet Club.

==== House of Torture (2025–present) ====
At Dominion 6.15 in Osaka-jo Hall on June 15, 2025, Owens betrayed the War Dogs and joined House of Torture. In the 2025 World Tag League, Owens teamed with stablemate Yujiro Takahashi in Block A and finished last with only 2 points. In March 2026, Owens competed in the New Japan Cup, where he was eliminated by Shota Umino in the first round. On April 4 at Sakura Genesis, Owens teamed with stablemates Takahashi and Ren Narita to unsuccessfully challenge Bishamon-tin (Boltin Oleg, Hirooki Goto and Yoshi-Hashi) for the NEVER Openweight 6-Man Tag Team Championship. Later in the show, Owens attacked the reigning NJPW World Television Champion Konosuke Takeshita, challenging him for the title. On Night 2 of Wrestling Dontaku on 4 May, Owens failed to defeat Takeshita for the title.

=== Ring of Honor (2018–2019) ===
On September 29, Owens made his debut for Ring of Honor, losing to Kenny King. Owens returned to ROH on August 24, 2019, defeating P. J. Black and LSG, thus earning a match for the ROH World Television Championship. The next day at ROH Honor For All, Owens was defeated by the reigning champion Shane Taylor.

== Championships and accomplishments ==
- All Star Wrestling
  - ASW Tag Team Championship (1 time) - with Michael Dunn
- Battle on the Border Wrestling
  - BOTB Heavyweight Championship (1 time)
- Canadian Wrestling's Elite
  - Elite 8 (2017)
- Texas Wrestling Cartel
  - TWC Tag Team Championship (1 time) – with Kenta
- Carolina Wrestling Showcase
  - CWS Legacy Championship (1 time)
- Mid-Atlantic Championship Wrestling
  - MACW Junior Heavyweight Championship (5 times)
- New Japan Pro-Wrestling
  - IWGP Tag Team Championship (3 times) – with Bad Luck Fale (1), and Kenta (2)
  - KOPW Provisional Championship (1 time)
  - New Japan Ranbo (2021)
- National Wrestling Alliance
  - NWA World Junior Heavyweight Championship (3 times)
  - CWA Television Championship (1 time)
  - NWA Mountain State Wrestling Junior Heavyweight Championship (1 time)
  - NWA World Junior Heavyweight Title Tournament (2012)
- NWA Southern All-Star Wrestling
  - NWA Southern Heavyweight Championship (1 time)
- NWA Mountain Empire Championship/Innovate Pro Wrestling
  - NWA Mountain Empire Championship (2 times)
  - Smoky Mountain Cup (2011)
  - NWA Southeastern Heavyweight Championship (1 time, final)
  - NWA Tennessee Tag Team Championship (1 time) – with Chris Richards
  - NWA United States Tag Team Championship (1 time) – with Chris Richards
- Rocket City Championship Wrestling
  - RCCW Sean Shocker Evans Memorial Tournament (2024)
- Pro Wrestling Freedom
  - PWF Heavyweight Championship (1 time)
- Pro Wrestling Illustrated
  - Ranked No. 222 of the top 500 singles wrestlers in the PWI 500 in 2015
- Southern States Wrestling
  - SSW Young Guns Television Championship (1 time)
- Southern Wrestling Federation
  - SWF Heavyweight Championship (1 time)
  - SWF Openweight Championship (1 time)
- Branded Outlaw Wrestling
  - Branded Outlaw Heavyweight Championship (1 time)
- Twin States Wrestling
  - TSW Twin States Championship (1 time, inaugural)
  - TSW Twin States Championship Tournament (2016)
