= Yoshinobu Kanemaru =

Japanese professional wrestler (born 1976)

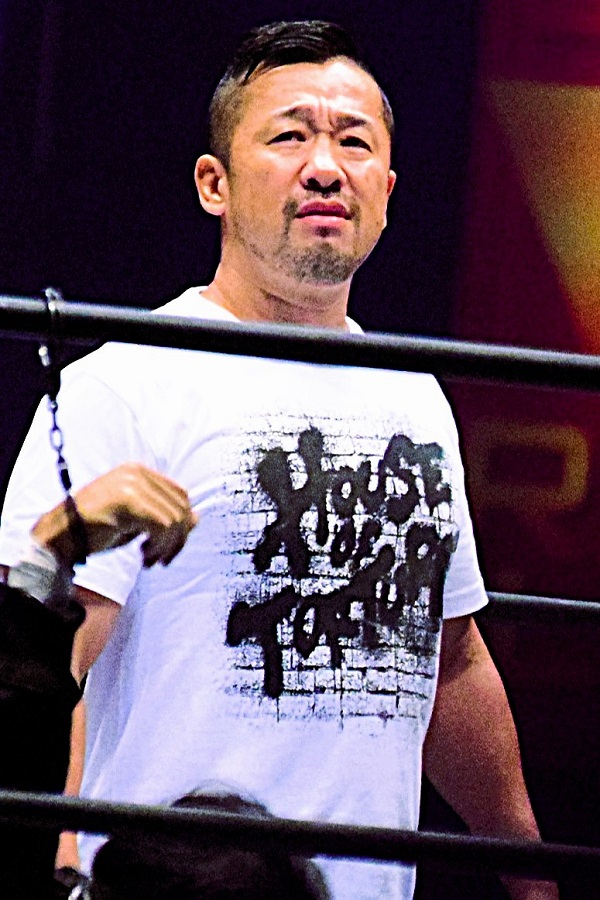
- Kanemaru in September 2023

Personal information
- Born: September 23, 1976 (age 50) Kōfu, Yamanashi, Japan

Professional wrestling career
- Ring name(s): Masked Burning #2; Yoshinobu Kanemaru
- Billed height: 1.73 m (5 ft 8 in)
- Billed weight: 85 kg (187 lb)
- Trained by: All Japan Pro Wrestling dojo
- Debut: July 6, 1996

Yoshinobu Kanemaru (金丸義信, Kanemaru Yoshinobu; born September 23, 1976) is a Japanese professional wrestler and backstage producer. He is signed to New Japan Pro-Wrestling (NJPW), where he is a member of House of Torture.

Trained at the All Japan Pro Wrestling dojo, Kanemaru left the promotion to join Pro Wrestling Noah. Across two stints with Noah, he is a seven-time GHC Junior Heavyweight Champion, a four-time GHC Junior Heavyweight Tag Team Champion, and won the 2009 Global Junior Heavyweight League and the 2009 Nippon TV Cup Jr. Heavyweight Tag League. In NJPW, he is a six-time Junior Heavyweight Tag Team Champion and won the 2021 Super Junior Tag League. In AJPW, he is a one-time World Junior Heavyweight Champion and a two-time All Asia Tag Team Champion.

Stable wise, Kanemaru was a member of the first and third incarnations of AJPW's Burning. He later joined NJPW's Suzuki-gun during an invasion storyline, and remained with the stable until its disbandment in 2022. He was then a member of Just 5 Guys, before turning on the stable to join House of Torture, which was a sub-group of Bullet Club at the time.

== Professional wrestling career ==
=== All Japan Pro Wrestling (1996–2000) ===
Kanemaru debuted in 1996 for All Japan Pro Wrestling (AJPW), in the last years of owner Giant Baba's regime, which had isolated the promotion from outsider wrestlers at the expense of the younger, lighter-weight talent. His first high-profile match in 1997 saw him team with New Japan Pro-Wrestling's Koji Kanemoto (Tiger Mask III) to battle freelancer Satoru Sayama, the original Tiger Mask, and his disciple, Michinoku Pro Wrestling's Yoshihiro Yamazaki (who would go on to become Tiger Mask IV), in a battle of Tiger Masks (as Mitsuharu Misawa, who once portrayed Tiger Mask II, was now a heavyweight and fully focused on the Triple Crown Heavyweight Championship, Kanemaru had to substitute for him in this interpromotional bout.)

Despite Baba's death in 1999, Kanemaru rarely had further opportunities to go into other promotions. It was only in 2000, after Misawa broke with AJPW to create Noah that his experience began widening. In a brief promotional alliance with Frontier Martial-Arts Wrestling (FMW), Kanemaru was able to win his first championship, the WEW Tag Team Championship, with heavyweight Masao Inoue.

=== Pro Wrestling Noah (2000–2013) ===
In 2001, Kanemaru underwent a transformation. His simple Bermuda shorts and boots were changed for tights and shinguards, and he began executing more high-risk maneuvers proper for a junior heavyweight. This paid off well for Kanemaru, as he plowed through a field of unlikely but talented competitors to win a tournament for the first-ever GHC Junior Heavyweight Championship. He would go on to win the title twice more, including a win over NJPW's long time junior ace, Jyushin Thunder Liger. In tag teams his experience widened as well, teaming with Tsuyoshi Kikuchi to win the IWGP Junior Heavyweight Tag Team Championship, and with Takashi Sugiura to win the GHC Junior Heavyweight Tag Team Championship twice. His win of the NJPW title served as a catalyst for the creation of the equivalent Noah title.

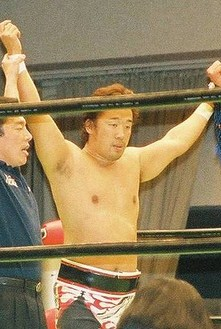
Kanemaru in 2007

In 2008, Kanemaru showed a serious shift in his attitude after the "SugiKane" team of himself and Takashi Sugiura went their separate ways after Sugiura moved to the heavyweight division. Kanemaru began using heel tactics in his matches. In the summer, he convinced Kotaro Suzuki to betray his friend and tag team partner Ricky Marvin and attacked the reigning Jr. Heavyweight tag champions Kenta and Taiji Ishimori. The new team would defeat the champions for their titles two weeks later after Kanemaru pinned Kenta after using his Touch-Out brainbuster.

On October 31, 2009, he defeated Liger in the finals of the Junior Heavyweight League to win the vacant GHC Junior Heavyweight Championship for a fifth time. On March 28, 2010, he defeated Ishimori. On 25 April, he defeated Delirious. On 10 July, he defeated Naomichi Marufuji. On December 5, Kanemaru lost the GHC Junior Heavyweight Championship to Kotaro Suzuki, ending his reign at 400 days, the longest in the title's history.

On May 9, 2012, Kanemaru defeated Katsuhiko Nakajima to win the GHC Junior Heavyweight Championship for the sixth time. He lost the title to All Japan Pro Wrestling's Shuji Kondo on September 29. On December 19, Noah announced that Kanemaru would be leaving the promotion, after refusing to re-sign following the firing of Kenta Kobashi. Kanemaru wrestled his final Noah match on December 24, teaming with Akitoshi Saito in a tag team match, where they were defeated by Naomichi Marufuji and Takashi Sugiura.

=== Return to All Japan (2013–2015) ===
On January 26, 2013, Kanemaru, Atsushi Aoki, Go Shiozaki, Jun Akiyama and Kotaro Suzuki, all of whom had quit Noah at the same time, announced that they had joined All Japan Pro Wrestling, forming the "Burning" stable. On February 23, Kanemaru brought Burning its first title, when he defeated Shuji Kondo for the World Junior Heavyweight Championship, which he was denied in his first AJPW stint. On May 11, Kanemaru made a one-night return to Noah to take part in Kenta Kobashi's retirement match at Final Burning in Budokan, where he, Go Shiozaki, Kenta and Maybach Taniguchi were defeated by Kobashi, Jun Akiyama, Keiji Muto and Kensuke Sasaki, with Kobashi pinning Kanemaru for the win. On July 5, following a mass exodus led by Muto, it was announced that Kanemaru, along with the rest of Burning, had signed an exclusive contract with All Japan. On December 15, Kanemaru lost the World Junior Heavyweight Championship to Último Dragón. On January 26, 2014, Kanemaru and Akiyama defeated former Burning stablemates Atsushi Aoki and Kotaro Suzuki to win the All Asia Tag Team Championship. They lost the title to Keisuke Ishii and Shigehiro Irie at a Dramatic Dream Team (DDT) event on April 29. Kanemaru regained the title from Mitsuya Nagai and Takeshi Minamino on March 22, 2015, now teaming with Último Dragón. They vacated the title on October 14. On November 20, Kanemaru announced he would be leaving All Japan and becoming a freelancer following December 15.

=== Return to Noah (2016) ===
In January 2016, Kanemaru returned to Pro Wrestling Noah, initially forming a partnership with Go Shiozaki, before turning on him on January 31 and joining Suzuki-gun. On February 24, Kanemaru defeated Taiji Ishimori to win the GHC Junior Heavyweight Championship for the seventh time. On June 24 at a show produced by Kanemaru's Suzuki-gun stablemates Taichi and Taka Michinoku, Kanemaru was one of two winners of a four-man round-robin tournament to earn a spot in the 2016 Super J-Cup. On July 20, Kanemaru defeated Bushi in his first round match in the tournament. On August 21, Kanemaru defeated Ryusuke Taguchi in the second round and Matt Sydal in the semifinals, before losing to reigning IWGP Junior Heavyweight Champion Kushida in the finals of the tournament. On September 23, Kanemaru lost the GHC Junior Heavyweight Championship to Atsushi Kotoge. Kanemaru had a chance to regain the GHC Junior title when he faced Kotoge at Great Voyage in Yokohama vol. 2 on October 23, but failed. Suzuki-gun's Noah invasion storyline concluded in December 2016.

=== New Japan Pro-Wrestling (2017–present) ===
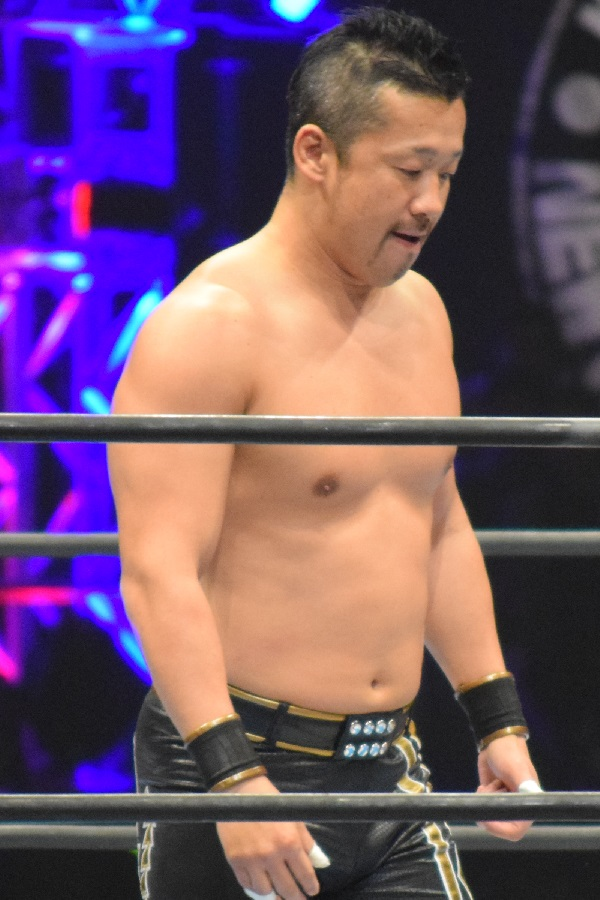
Kanemaru in February 2017

==== Suzuki-gun (2017–2022) ====
On January 5, 2017, Suzuki-gun, Kanemaru included, returned to New Japan Pro-Wrestling (NJPW). On March 6, Kanemaru and Taichi defeated Roppongi Vice to become the new IWGP Junior Heavyweight Tag Team Champions. They lost the title back to Roppongi Vice in their second defense on April 27. Kanemaru then entered the Best of the Super Juniors tournament, where he finished with a record of four wins and three losses, failing to advance to the finals. On NJPW's 46th Anniversary Show on March 6, 2018, Kanemaru, along with El Desperado won the IWGP Junior Heavyweight Tag Team Championships in a three-way tag team match that involved Roppongi 3K and Bushi and Hiromu Takahashi. In May, he entered the 2018 Best of the Super Juniors tournament. He finished the tournament with three wins and four losses, failing to advance to the finals. Between October and November, he and Desperado took part in the Super Junior Tag League, advancing to the finals thanks to a record of five wins and two losses. After months of reigning, they fought against Roppongi 3K and the team of Bushi and Shingo Takagi, a match won by the latter on January 4, 2019, at Wrestle Kingdom 13, in a triple threat tag team match, ending their reign at 304 days. Kanemaru would enter the 2019 Best of the Super Juniors tournament, ending with a record of three wins and six losses, including wins over Sho and long time rival Taiji Ishimori, however failing to advance from the block.

In June 2020, Kanemaru would enter the New Japan Cup tournament for the first time in his career, defeating Yuya Uemura in the first round, before losing to Ishimori in the second. On September 11, 2020, Kanemaru and Desperado won a tournament to win the IWGP Jr. Tag Team Championship by last defeating the team of Bushi and Hiromu Takahashi. Kanemaru signed a full-time contract with New Japan Pro-Wrestling, that would see him continue to perform as a wrestler, as well as becoming a producer for the company. On January 4, 2021, at Wrestle Kingdom 15, Desperado and Kanemaru successfully defended the titles against Ryusuke Taguchi and Master Wato.

In January, Kanemaru and Desperado lost the IWGP Junior Heavyweight Tag Team Championships to Ishimori and El Phantasmo, ending their second reign at 134 days. The duo regained their titles 33 days later during the Road to Castle Attack tour. In April at Sakura Genesis, Kanemaru and Desperado lost the titles once again to Roppongi 3K. In July at Wrestle Grand Slam in Tokyo Dome, Kanemaru competed in the New Japan Ranbo for the Provisional KOPW 2021 trophy, but the match was won by Chase Owens. The following month in August, Kanemaru and Desperado competed in the Super Junior Tag League, where they finished joint top of the block with eight points. In the finals, they defeated IWGP Junior Heavyweight Tag Team Champions Ishimori and Phantasmo to win their first Super Junior Tag League tournament. They had their title shot at Wrestle Grand Slam in MetLife Dome in September, where they defeated Ishimori and Phantasmo and once again to win their fourth IWGP Junior Tag Team Championship. The duo lost the titles the following month to Flying Tiger (Robbie Eagles and Tiger Mask). In November, Kanemaru competed in the Best of the Super Juniors, finishing with eight points, failing to advance to the finals. On December 24, Kanemaru lost to Toru Yano, in a KOPW 2021 Championship match. On January 4, 2022, at night one of Wrestle Kingdom 16, Kanemaru competed in the New Japan Ranbo match, but failed to last until the final four. On Night 2, Suzuki-gun lost to Master Wato, Hiroyoshi Tenzan and Satoshi Kojima. On Night 3, Kanemaru and Suzuki-gun stablemate Zack Sabre Jr. lost to Pro Wrestling Noah's Naomichi Marufuji and Yoshinari Ogawa.

On February 19 during the NJPW New Years Golden Series, Kanemaru and Desperado competed in a four-way tag-team match for the IWGP Junior Heavyweight Tag Team Championships, but the match was won by Six or Nine (Master Wato and Ryusuke Taguchi), whilst also involving champions Flying Tiger, and Ishimori and Phantasmo. In March, Kanemaru entered the New Japan Cup, receiving a bye to the second round, but lost to Cima. On May 1 at Wrestling Dontaku, Kanemaru and Desperado faced Six or Nine for the IWGP Junior Heavyweight tag team championships, but were defeated. In the same month, Kanemaru competed in the Best of the Super Juniors, competing in the A Block. Kanemaru finished with eight points, failing to advance to the finals. In June at Dominion 6.12 in Osaka-jo Hall, Kanemaru teamed with Desperado and Sabre to face House of Torture (Evil, Yujiro Takahashi and Sho) for the NEVER Openweight 6-Man Tag Team Championship, but lost. Later in the month, Kanemaru competed in a tournament to advance to Forbidden Door for a chance to be crowned the inaugural AEW All-Atlantic Championship, however Kanemaru was defeated by Tomohiro Ishii in the qualifying round. Six days later, Kanemaru and Desperado teamed on the buy-in of Forbidden Door, against Swerve in our Glory (Keith Lee and Swerve Strickland), in a losing effort. In October, Kanemaru competed in another tournament to crown the inaugural NJPW World Television Championship, but lost to David Finlay in the first round. In November, Kanemaru competed in the Super Junior Tag League, this time teaming with Douki. The duo ended the tournament campaign with eight points failing to advance to the finals. At the World Tag League and Best of the Super Juniors finals, Minoru Suzuki announced the disbandment of Suzuki-gun by the end of the year. The final match between the stable took place on December 23, where the team of Kanemaru, Taichi, Sabre and Douki defeated Suzuki, Lance Archer, Desperado and Taka Michinoku. After the match, each of the Suzuki-gun members spoke about their memories as a part of the group and thanked leader Suzuki. The night ended with all members posing with the Suzuki-gun flag, only to be interrupted by former member Takashi Iizuka, causing all nine men to pose in the ring, behind the Suzuki-gun flag.

==== Just 5 Guys and House of Torture (2023–present) ====
On January 4 at Wrestle Kingdom 17, Kanemaru competed in the New Japan Ranbo, but failed to last until the final four. The following day at New Year Dash!!, Kanemaru reunited with former Suzuki-gun stablemates, Taka Michinoku, Douki and Taichi to form a stable known as Just 4 Guys. In February at The New Beginning in Sapporo, Kanemaru and Douki, challenged Catch 2/2 (Francesco Akira and TJP) for the IWGP Junior Heavyweight Tag Team Championships, but were defeated. During the New Japan Cup, the stable added cup winner Sanada, thus changing their name to Just 5 Guys. Following Sanada winning the IWGP World Heavyweight Championship at Sakura Genesis, he was confronted by former stablemate Hiromu Takahashi, who sought a shot at the world title. Sanada accepted, however only on the basis that Kanemaru was granted a title shot at Takahashi's IWGP Junior Heavyweight Championship, which Takahashi accepted. On April 27, Kanemaru was unsuccessful in defeating Takahashi. In May, Kanemaru competed in the Best of the Super Juniors, competing in the B Block. Kanemaru finished the tournament with a score of six points, failing to advance to the semi-finals.

Following the 2023 G1 Climax, Kanemaru suffered a supposed knee injury while fighting the House of Torture and went on a small hiatus for the remainder of the month of August. A month later, during Taichi's defense match against Sho for the KOPW Championship, Kanemaru returned seemingly to help Taichi defend himself. But, as soon as Kanemaru would put whiskey on his mouth and perform his whiskey spit, he spat it on Taichi's face instead and hit him with his Touch-Out brainbuster. Afterwards, Evil announced Kanemaru was leaving Just 5 Guys to join House of Torture. On November 19 2026 at Tanahashi Jam 2 Kanemaru attacked Toru Yano and stole the NJPW World Televison Championship after he beat fellow HOT member Shun Skywalker for it.

== Championships and accomplishments ==
- All Japan Pro Wrestling
  - All Asia Tag Team Championship (2 times) – with Jun Akiyama (1), and Último Dragón (1)
  - World Junior Heavyweight Championship (1 time)
  - Asunaro Cup (2000)
  - January 3 Korakuen Hall Junior Heavyweight Battle Royal (1999)
- New Japan Pro-Wrestling
  - IWGP Junior Heavyweight Tag Team Championship (6 times) – with Tsuyoshi Kikuchi (1), Taichi (1), and El Desperado (4)
  - Super Junior Tag League (2021) – with El Desperado
  - Vacant IWGP Junior Heavyweight Tag Team Championship Tournament (2020) - with El Desperado
- Pro Wrestling Illustrated
  - PWI ranked him #161 of the top 500 singles wrestlers in the PWI 500 in 2013
- Pro Wrestling Noah
  - GHC Junior Heavyweight Championship (7 times)
  - GHC Junior Heavyweight Tag Team Championship (4 times) – with Takashi Sugiura (2), Kotaro Suzuki (1) and Kenta (1)
  - Junior Heavyweight League (2009)
  - Nippon TV Cup Jr. Heavyweight Tag League (2009) – with Kotaro Suzuki
  - One Night Junior Heavyweight Six Man Tag Team Tournament (2003) – with Makoto Hashi and Takashi Sugiura
  - One Night Tag Tournament Winner (2001) – with Kentaro Shiga
  - One Day Jr. Heavyweight Six Man Tag Tournament (2008) – with Kotaro Suzuki and Genba Hirayanagi
- Taka & Taichi Box Office
  - Super J-Cup Qualifying League (2016)
- Tokyo Sports
  - Newcomer Award (1998)
- Westside Xtreme Wrestling
  - Trios Tournament (2006) – with Doug Williams and Takashi Sugiura
- World Entertainment Wrestling
  - WEW World Tag Team Championship (1 time) – with Masao Inoue
- Xtreme Wrestling Entertainment
  - XWE Cruiserweight Championship (1 time)
