= The New Beginning in Osaka (2016) =

Professional wrestling event in Osaka, Japan

- Promotional poster for the event, featuring various NJPW wrestlers
- Promotion: New Japan Pro-Wrestling
- Date: February 11, 2016
- City: Osaka, Japan
- Venue: Edion Arena Osaka
- Attendance: 5,180

Pay-per-view chronology
← Previous; Wrestle Kingdom 10 in Tokyo Dome	Next → New Japan Cup

The New Beginning chronology
← Previous; Sendai	Next → Niigata

New Japan Pro-Wrestling events chronology
← Previous; Fantastica Mania 2016	Next → The New Beginning in Niigata

The New Beginning in Osaka (2016) was a professional wrestling pay-per-view (PPV) event promoted by New Japan Pro-Wrestling (NJPW). The event took place on February 11, 2016, in Osaka, Osaka, at the Edion Arena Osaka. The event featured nine matches, four of which were contested for championships. In the main event, Kazuchika Okada defended the IWGP Heavyweight Championship against Hirooki Goto.

In addition to airing worldwide through NJPW World, the event also aired in Japan as a PPV through SKY PerfecTV!. The New Beginning in Osaka was the ninth event under the New Beginning name and the third under the New Beginning in Osaka name.

== Storylines ==
The New Beginning in Osaka featured nine professional wrestling matches that involved different wrestlers from pre-existing scripted feuds and storylines. Wrestlers portrayed villains, heroes, or less distinguishable characters in the scripted events that built tension and culminated in a wrestling match or series of matches.

The first matches for The New Beginning in Osaka were announced on January 12, 2016. The event would be main evented by Kazuchika Okada making his third defense of the IWGP Heavyweight Championship against challenger Hirooki Goto. The match stemmed from the previous August's G1 Climax tournament, where Goto defeated Okada at the same arena in Osaka. Following the win, Goto, then the IWGP Intercontinental Champion, began petitioning for a championship unification match with Okada, but the match never came to fruition. Following Wrestle Kingdom 10 in Tokyo Dome on January 4, 2016, where Okada successfully defended the IWGP Heavyweight Championship against Hiroshi Tanahashi, Goto challenged him to a title match, which led to Okada ridiculing him for his numerous unsuccessful attempts at winning the title. On January 6, Goto attacked Okada at a press conference, setting up a title match between the two for The New Beginning in Osaka. Goto continued attacking Okada during each day of the tour leading to The New Beginning in Osaka, drawing boos from NJPW crowds. He also stated that upon becoming the IWGP Heavyweight Champion, he would not accept a title challenge from Okada unless he first won the IWGP Intercontinental Championship. Goto entered the match with a seven-match losing streak in IWGP Heavyweight Championship matches, having lost all of his attempts at winning the title ever since his first challenge in November 2007.

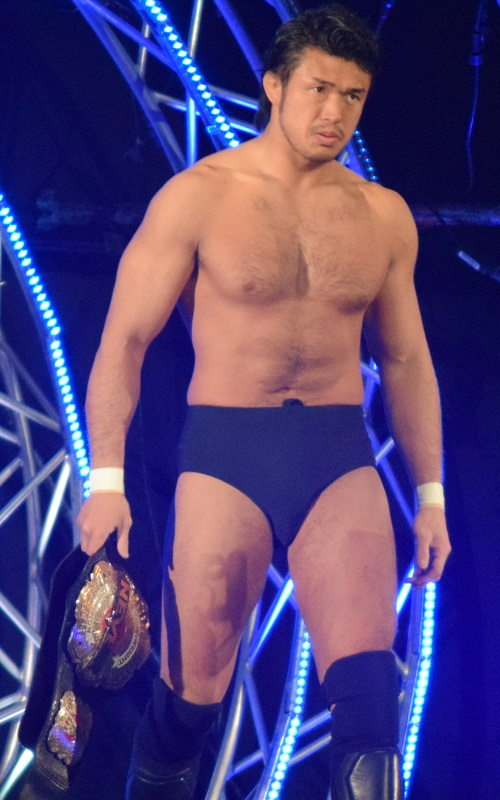
Katsuyori Shibata, who was set to make his first defense of the NEVER Openweight Championship at The New Beginning in Osaka

The New Beginning in Osaka would also feature two rematches from Wrestle Kingdom 10 in Tokyo Dome contested for the NEVER championships. Katsuyori Shibata, who won his first singles title at the event, was set to make his first defense of the NEVER Openweight Championship in a rematch with Tomohiro Ishii. Meanwhile, the inaugural NEVER Openweight 6-Man Tag Team Champions Toru Yano and the Ring of Honor (ROH) tag team of Jay Briscoe and Mark Briscoe were scheduled to defend their newly won title in a rematch with the Bullet Club trio of Bad Luck Fale, Tama Tonga and Yujiro Takahashi.

The event would also feature new IWGP Junior Heavyweight Tag Team Champions The Young Bucks (Matt Jackson and Nick Jackson) defending their title in a three-way match against Matt Sydal and Ricochet and reDRagon (Bobby Fish and Kyle O'Reilly). The Young Bucks won the title at Wrestle Kingdom 10 in Tokyo Dome in a four-way match, which, in addition to these three teams, also included Roppongi Vice (Beretta and Rocky Romero). reDRagon entered the match as the defending champions, but lost the title due to The Young Bucks pinning Romero for the win.

The rest of the matches were announced on February 1. Included were several matches building up to matches taking place three days later at The New Beginning in Niigata. In the semi-main event of the show, Hiroshi Tanahashi was set to team up with IWGP Tag Team Champions G.B.H. (Togi Makabe and Tomoaki Honma) to take on the Bullet Club trio of Doc Gallows, Karl Anderson and Kenny Omega, which built up an IWGP Intercontinental Championship match between Tanahashi and Omega and an IWGP Tag Team Championship match between G.B.H. and Gallows and Anderson. Another six-man tag team match between Los Ingobernables de Japón (Bushi, Evil and Tetsuya Naito) and the trio of Juice Robinson, Kushida and Michael Elgin built to an IWGP Junior Heavyweight Championship match between challenger Bushi and champion Kushida.

== Event ==
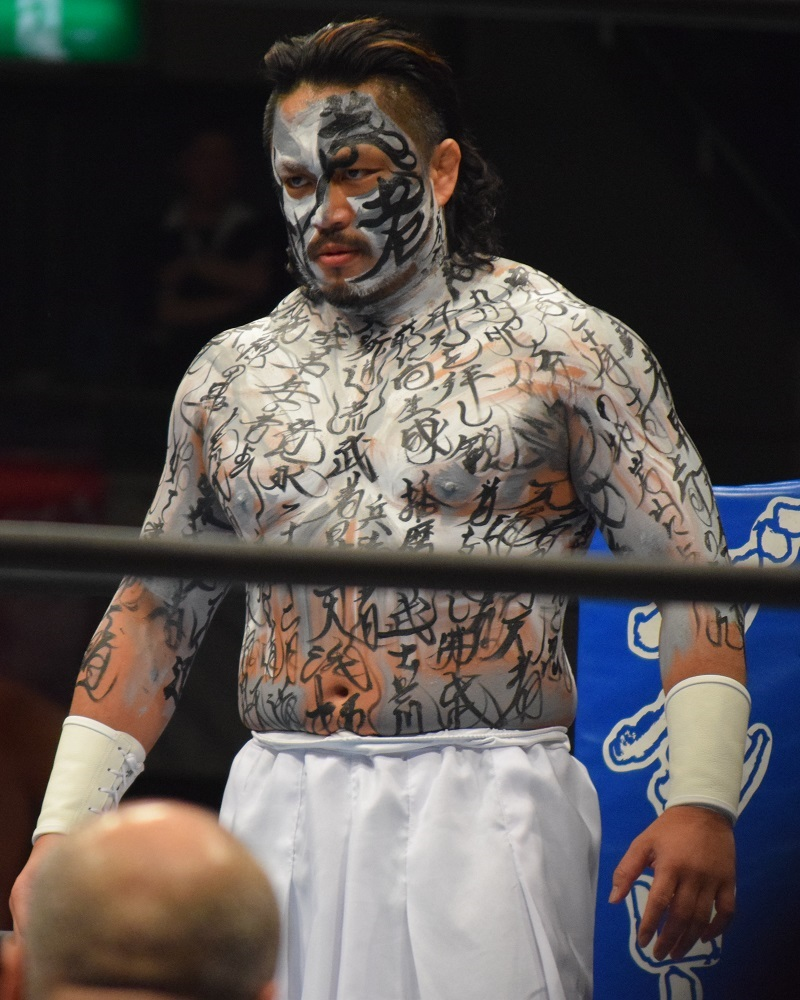
Hirooki Goto in his new look at The New Beginning in Osaka, prior to making his eighth unsuccessful attempt at winning the IWGP Heavyweight Championship

In the first title match of the show, Jay Briscoe, Mark Briscoe and Toru Yano defended the NEVER Openweight 6-Man Tag Team Championship against Bullet Club's Bad Luck Fale, Tama Tonga and Yujiro Takahashi. Towards the end of the match, Yano gave Fale and Takahashi the 634, a double low blow, but then walked into a low blow from Tonga, who then hit him with his finishing move, the Veleno, to win the match and make Bullet Club the new champions. After the match, Yano requested a rematch for The New Beginning in Niigata. In the second title match, Matt Sydal and Ricochet defeated The Young Bucks and reDRagon to become the new IWGP Junior Heavyweight Tag Team Champions. In the next match, Katsuyori Shibata defeated Tomohiro Ishii in a rematch from Wrestle Kingdom 10 in Tokyo Dome to retain the NEVER Openweight Championship.

In the semi-main event, Bullet Club's Doc Gallows, Karl Anderson and Kenny Omega defeated Hiroshi Tanahashi, Togi Makabe and Tomoaki Honma with Omega pinning Honma for the win. After the match, Bullet Club continued attacking Tanahashi's right shoulder, which he had legitimately dislocated only weeks earlier, setting up the IWGP Intercontinental Championship match between him and Omega. The main event saw Kazuchika Okada defend the IWGP Heavyweight Championship against Hirooki Goto. Goto entered the match covered in white body paint, but was defeated after being hit with three Rainmakers by the defending champion. In a post-match interview, Okada praised Goto and offered him a spot in the Chaos stable. With the loss, Goto set a new record for failing to win the IWGP Heavyweight Championship in eight consecutive title shots.

== Reception ==
Dave Meltzer of the Wrestling Observer Newsletter called the show "good", but "far from the caliber of most big shows in recent years", adding that it "felt empty" without A.J. Styles and Shinsuke Nakamura. He called the main event a "disappointment", writing "fans just weren't that into Okada's IWGP title defense against Hirooki Goto, who needed badly to step up and didn't". He gave the match three and a half stars out of five, while awarding the IWGP Junior Heavyweight Tag Team Championship match four stars and the NEVER Openweight Championship match four and a half stars, the highest rating of the show. Overall, Meltzer stated that the show made NJPW look like a "once super-hot promotion past its peak in the midst of a slow decline".

== Aftermath ==
Throughout the tour following The New Beginning in Osaka, Okada kept making invitations for Goto to join Chaos, but was repeatedly turned down. However, when Okada saved Goto from Tetsuya Naito on March 12, he finally accepted the invitation, becoming the newest member of Chaos.

== Results ==
No.	Results	Stipulations	Times
1	Jay White defeated David Finlay	Singles match	07:01
2	Jyushin Thunder Liger, Ryusuke Taguchi and Tiger Mask defeated Chaos (Gedo, Kazushi Sakuraba and Yoshi-Hashi)	Six-man tag team match	07:25
3	Tencozy (Hiroyoshi Tenzan and Satoshi Kojima) defeated Manabu Nakanishi and Yuji Nagata	Tag team match	11:05
4	Los Ingobernables de Japón (Bushi, Evil and Tetsuya Naito) defeated Juice Robinson, Kushida and Michael Elgin	Six-man tag team match	08:48
5	Bullet Club (Bad Luck Fale, Tama Tonga and Yujiro Takahashi) (with Shiori) defeated The Briscoes (Jay Briscoe and Mark Briscoe) and Toru Yano (c)	Six-man tag team match for the NEVER Openweight 6-Man Tag Team Championship	10:08
6	Matt Sydal and Ricochet defeated The Young Bucks (Matt Jackson and Nick Jackson) (c) (with Cody Hall) and reDRagon (Bobby Fish and Kyle O'Reilly)	Three-way tag team match for the IWGP Junior Heavyweight Tag Team Championship	14:59
7	Katsuyori Shibata (c) defeated Tomohiro Ishii	Singles match for the NEVER Openweight Championship	18:47
8	Bullet Club (Doc Gallows, Karl Anderson and Kenny Omega) (with Matt Jackson and Nick Jackson) defeated Hiroshi Tanahashi and G.B.H. (Togi Makabe and Tomoaki Honma)	Six-man tag team match	17:11
9	Kazuchika Okada (c) (with Gedo) defeated Hirooki Goto	Singles match for the IWGP Heavyweight Championship	25:27
(c) / – the champion(s) heading into the match
