= The New Beginning in Niigata =

2016 New Japan Pro-Wrestling event

- Promotional poster for the event, featuring various NJPW wrestlers
- Promotion: New Japan Pro-Wrestling
- Date: February 14, 2016
- City: Nagaoka, Japan
- Venue: Aore Nagaoka
- Attendance: 3,603

Event chronology
← Previous; The New Beginning in Osaka	Next → Honor Rising: Japan

The New Beginning chronology
← Previous; 2016	Next → 2017

The New Beginning in Niigata was a professional wrestling event promoted by New Japan Pro-Wrestling (NJPW). The event took place on February 14, 2016, in Nagaoka, Niigata, at the Aore Nagaoka. The event featured nine matches, four of which were contested for championships. In the main event, Hiroshi Tanahashi took on Kenny Omega to determine the new IWGP Intercontinental Champion, following previous champion Shinsuke Nakamura's departure from NJPW. The New Beginning in Niigata was the tenth event under the New Beginning name and the first to take place in Niigata.

== Production ==
=== Storylines ===
The New Beginning in Niigata featured nine professional wrestling matches that involved different wrestlers from pre-existing scripted feuds and storylines. Wrestlers portrayed villains, heroes, or less distinguishable characters in the scripted events that built tension and culminated in a wrestling match or series of matches.

The first matches for The New Beginning in Niigata were announced on January 12, 2016. The event would be main evented by a match for the vacant IWGP Intercontinental Championship. On January 4, 2016, at Wrestle Kingdom 10 in Tokyo Dome, Shinsuke Nakamura successfully defended the title against Bullet Club member A.J. Styles. However, only hours later it was reported that Nakamura, along with Styles, Doc Gallows and Karl Anderson, had given his notice to NJPW and would be leaving the promotion to join the WWE. The following day, Nakamura was pinned in a tag team match by another Bullet Club member, Kenny Omega. Afterwards, the rest of Bullet Club turned on Styles with Omega taking over the leadership of the stable, while also stating that he was moving from the junior heavyweight division to the heavyweight division and challenging Nakamura for the IWGP Intercontinental Championship. On January 6, Nakamura confirmed he was leaving NJPW at the end of January, which led to NJPW announcing they were stripping him of the IWGP Intercontinental Championship and that at The New Beginning in Niigata Omega would face a mystery opponent to determine the new champion. On January 30, Omega confronted Nakamura following his final NJPW match, claiming that he was afraid to face him, which led to Hiroshi Tanahashi appearing and announcing that he was going to be Omega's opponent at The New Beginning in Niigata. NJPW formally announced the match between Omega and Tanahashi two days later. In the week leading up to the announcement, it was reported that Tanahashi had dislocated his shoulder on January 24, but would continue to work through the injury. The legitimate injury led to an angle at The New Beginning in Osaka on February 11, where Omega led a Bullet Club assault on Tanahashi's shoulder.

The New Beginning in Niigata would also feature a rematch from Wrestle Kingdom 10 in Tokyo Dome, where G.B.H. (Togi Makabe and Tomoaki Honma) were set to defend their newly won IWGP Tag Team Championship against previous champions, Bullet Club representatives Doc Gallows and Karl Anderson. Gallows and Anderson worked the event as free agents, with Anderson's NJPW contract having expired at the end of January 2016. Though Anderson publicly denied he was leaving the promotion, The New Beginning in Niigata was expected to be one of his and Gallows's last NJPW appearances before leaving for WWE. Also on the card, Kushida was set to defend the IWGP Junior Heavyweight Championship against Bushi. This match stemmed from events taking place at a show the day after Wrestle Kingdom 10 in Tokyo Dome, where Bushi attacked Kushida and challenged him to a title match.

The rest of the matches were announced on February 1. Among the matches added was a six-man tag team match, where the Chaos stable's Kazuchika Okada, Tomohiro Ishii and Yoshi-Hashi were set to take on Hirooki Goto, Juice Robinson and Katsuyori Shibata, coming off The New Beginning in Osaka, where Goto unsuccessfully challenged Okada for the IWGP Heavyweight Championship, while Ishii unsuccessfully challenged Shibata for the NEVER Openweight Championship. NJPW promoted the match as an opportunity for Chaos to demonstrate their cohesion in the wake of the stable's leader Shinsuke Nakamura's departure from the promotion.

On February 12, the day after The New Beginning in Osaka, where Bullet Club's Bad Luck Fale, Tama Tonga and Yujiro Takahashi defeated Chaos' Jay Briscoe, Mark Briscoe and Toru Yano to become the new NEVER Openweight 6-Man Tag Team Champions, NJPW announced that the previously scheduled non-title match between the two teams in Niigata, would now be contested for the title.

== Event ==
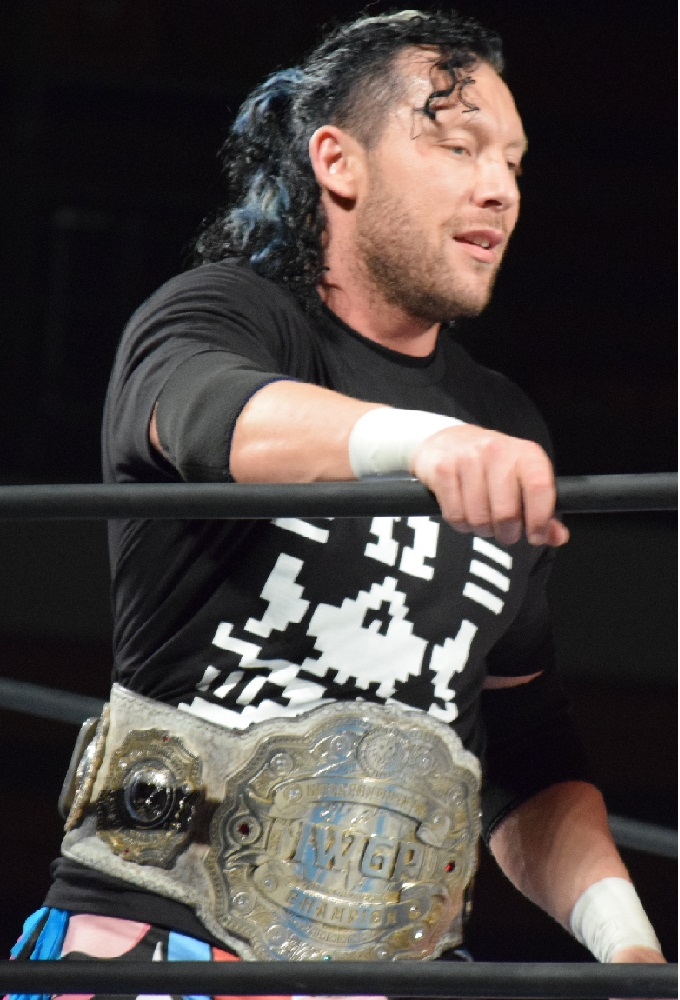
Kenny Omega, who captured the IWGP Intercontinental Championship in the main event

The first title match of the show saw Bullet Club's Bad Luck Fale, Tama Tonga and Yujiro Takahashi defend their newly won NEVER Openweight 6-Man Tag Team Championship against Jay Briscoe, Mark Briscoe and Toru Yano. In the finish of the match, after the Briscoes had pulled Fale and Tonga out of the ring, Takahashi attempted to low blow Yano like he had done when Bullet Club won the title at The New Beginning in Osaka, but was stopped by the referee of the match. Yano then used the distraction to low blow Takahashi and then pinned him with the Urakasumi to regain the title. The following match saw Chaos' Kazuchika Okada, Tomohiro Ishii and Yoshi-Hashi defeat Hirooki Goto, Juice Robinson and Katsuyori Shibata with Okada pinning Robinson for the win. After the match, Okada repeated his offer from The New Beginning in Osaka by offering Goto a spot in Chaos. Goto, however, walked off without answering. The second title match of the show saw Kushida defend the IWGP Junior Heavyweight Championship against Bushi. The match featured repeated outside interference from Bushi's Los Ingobernables de Japón stablemates Evil and Tetsuya Naito, before they were eventually stopped by Jay White and Ryusuke Taguchi, allowing Kushida to submit Bushi to win the match and retain the title.

In the eighth match of the show, Togi Makabe and Tomoaki Honma successfully defended the IWGP Tag Team Championship against Bullet Club's Doc Gallows and Karl Anderson. After the match, Tama Tonga entered the ring and challenged Makabe and Honma to a title match, stating that his partner would be a new Bullet Club member. The challenge was accepted by the champions. Meanwhile, Anderson and Gallows bowed to the crowd ahead of their impending departure from NJPW. In the main event of the show, Hiroshi Tanahashi took on Kenny Omega for the vacant IWGP Intercontinental Championship. Early in the match, Omega sent his Bullet Club stablemates Cody Hall and Yujiro Takahashi away from ringside, stating that he wanted a clean win. However, when Tanahashi had the match won, Hall came back out and distracted the referee of the match as The Young Bucks (Matt Jackson and Nick Jackson) entered the ring and attacked Tanahashi. Eventually, Michael Elgin came out, attacked The Young Bucks and carried them backstage. In the ring, Omega avoided Tanahashi's finishing maneuver, the High Fly Flow, hit him with the V-Trigger, his version of Shinsuke Nakamura's Bomaye finisher, and then pinned him with the Katayoku no Tenshi to win the match and become the new IWGP Intercontinental Champion.

== Reception ==
The Wrestling Observer Newsletter praised the main event as a "masterpiece" in terms of storytelling and accomplishing the goal of making Omega a "superstar" without hurting Tanahashi as he was "more important than ever" following the departures of A.J. Styles and Shinsuke Nakamura. The publication's editor Dave Meltzer later added the main event to a list of eight matches over the past 35 years that he felt "made a new superstar instantaneously at a time when one was needed". He gave the match four and three quarter stars out of five, while also praising the IWGP Junior Heavyweight and Tag Team Championship matches, giving them four and a quarter stars and four stars, respectively.

== Results ==
No.	Results	Stipulations	Times
1	Bullet Club (Cody Hall, Matt Jackson and Nick Jackson) defeated Captain New Japan, Jyushin Thunder Liger and Tiger Mask	Six-man tag team match	05:55
2	reDRagon (Bobby Fish and Kyle O'Reilly) defeated Chaos (Gedo and Kazushi Sakuraba)	Tag team match	08:25
3	Matt Sydal, Ricochet and Tencozy (Hiroyoshi Tenzan and Satoshi Kojima) defeated David Finlay, Manabu Nakanishi, Ryusuke Taguchi and Yuji Nagata	Eight-man tag team match	08:14
4	Los Ingobernables de Japón (Evil and Tetsuya Naito) defeated Jay White and Michael Elgin	Tag team match	08:38
5	Chaos (Jay Briscoe, Mark Briscoe and Toru Yano) defeated Bullet Club (Bad Luck Fale, Tama Tonga and Yujiro Takahashi) (c)	Six-man tag team match for the NEVER Openweight 6-Man Tag Team Championship	08:20
6	Chaos (Kazuchika Okada, Tomohiro Ishii and Yoshi-Hashi) (with Gedo) defeated Hirooki Goto, Juice Robinson and Katsuyori Shibata	Six-man tag team match	16:36
7	Kushida (c) defeated Bushi	Singles match for the IWGP Junior Heavyweight Championship	16:32
8	G.B.H. (Togi Makabe and Tomoaki Honma) (c) defeated Bullet Club (Doc Gallows and Karl Anderson) (with Bad Luck Fale and Tama Tonga)	Tag team match for the IWGP Tag Team Championship	14:16
9	Kenny Omega (with Cody Hall and Yujiro Takahashi) defeated Hiroshi Tanahashi	Singles match for the vacant IWGP Intercontinental Championship	29:10
(c) / – the champion(s) heading into the match
