= Wrestle Kingdom 10 =

2016 New Japan Pro-Wrestling event

- Promotional poster for the event, featuring various NJPW wrestlers
- Promotion: New Japan Pro-Wrestling
- Date: January 4, 2016
- City: Tokyo, Japan
- Venue: Tokyo Dome
- Attendance: 25,204

New Japan Pro-Wrestling events chronology
← Previous; Power Struggle	Next → New Year Dash!!

Wrestle Kingdom chronology
← Previous; 9	Next → 11

Wrestle Kingdom 10 in Tokyo Dome was a professional wrestling pay-per-view (PPV) event promoted by New Japan Pro-Wrestling (NJPW). The event took place on January 4, 2016, in Tokyo, Japan, at the Tokyo Dome. It was the 25th January 4 Tokyo Dome Show. The event featured ten matches and was main evented by Kazuchika Okada defending the IWGP Heavyweight Championship against Hiroshi Tanahashi.

As part of the talent exchange partnership between NJPW and the American Ring of Honor (ROH) promotion, the event featured a match for the ROH World Championship as well as the NJPW debuts of ROH wrestlers Cheeseburger, Jay Lethal, Jay Briscoe and Mark Briscoe.

== Production ==
Other on-screen personnel
Role:	Name:
English commentators	Kevin Kelly
English commentators	Matt Striker
English commentators	Yoshitatsu
Japanese commentators	Shinpei Nogami
Japanese commentators	Kazuo Yamazaki
Japanese commentators	Jushin Thunder Liger
Japanese commentators	Masahiro Chono
Japanese commentators	Soichi Shibata
Japanese commentators	Kakuryo Yasuda
Japanese commentators	Katsuhiko Kanazawa
Japanese commentators	Shumpei Terakawa
Japanese commentators	Hiroki Mikami
Japanese commentators	Yohei Onishi
Japanese commentators	Yasutaro Matsuki
Ring announcers	Makoto Abe
Referees	Kenta Sato
Referees	Marty Asami
Referees	Red Shoes Unno
Referees	Tiger Hattori

=== Background ===
The event aired in Japan as a pay-per-view (PPV) through SKY PerfecTV!, and worldwide through NJPW's internet streaming site, NJPW World. As opposed to the previous year's Wrestle Kingdom 9, the event did not air on American PPV, despite the previous year's airing being considered a "solid success". Reportedly both Jeff Jarrett and Ring of Honor (ROH) were interested in getting Wrestle Kingdom 10 on American PPV, but were both turned down by NJPW. Instead NJPW announced that the internet stream would include English commentary, provided by Kevin Kelly and Matt Striker, who had been a part of the first English commentary stream for King of Pro-Wrestling in October 2015, as well as the debuting Yoshitatsu, who was brought in to translate Japanese. Yoshitatsu is a former WWE wrestler, who returned to NJPW in October 2014, but broke his neck only a month later and had been inactive from the promotion ever since.

=== Storylines ===
Wrestle Kingdom 10 featured ten professional wrestling matches that involved different wrestlers from pre-existing scripted feuds and storylines. Wrestlers portrayed villains, heroes, or less distinguishable characters in the scripted events that built tension and culminated in a wrestling match or series of matches.

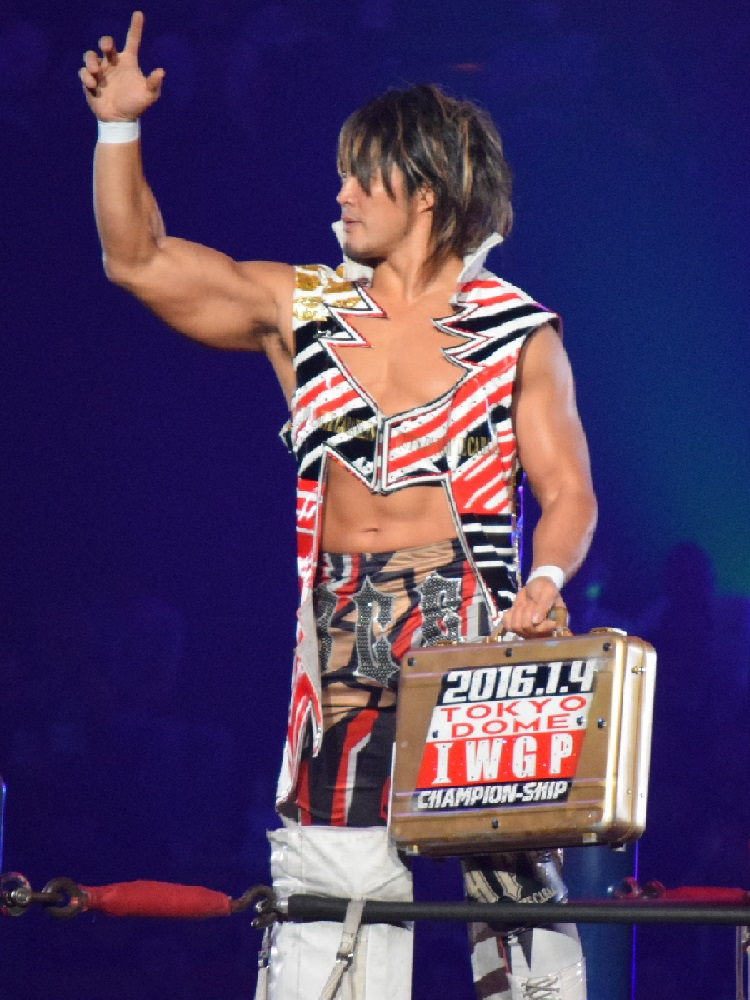
Hiroshi Tanahashi holding a briefcase containing the contract for an IWGP Heavyweight Championship match at Wrestle Kingdom 10

Wrestle Kingdom 10 was main evented by Kazuchika Okada defending the IWGP Heavyweight Championship against Hiroshi Tanahashi. Okada won the title on July 5, 2015, by defeating A.J. Styles at Dominion 7.5 in Osaka-jo Hall, while Tanahashi became the number one contender at the Tokyo Dome by winning the 2015 G1 Climax, defeating Shinsuke Nakamura in the final on August 16. On the road to the Tokyo Dome, Okada retained his title in a rematch with A.J. Styles, while Tanahashi defended his title match contract against Bad Luck Fale and Tetsuya Naito, the two wrestlers who had defeated him during the G1 Climax, leading to the Tokyo Dome match being made official on October 12. This would mark the seventh IWGP Heavyweight Championship match between Okada and Tanahashi with both wrestlers having won three of the previous matches. This also marked Tanahashi's sixth Wrestle Kingdom in a row main event with him having won all five previous main events, two of which were against Okada.

The second match for Wrestle Kingdom 10 was set up on November 7, 2015, after Shinsuke Nakamura had retained the IWGP Intercontinental Championship against Karl Anderson at Power Struggle. Before the match, Nakamura had announced he would defend his title at the Tokyo Dome in an open challenge and asked for his challenger to come forward at Power Struggle. Following the match, Anderson's Bullet Club stablemate A.J. Styles entered the ring and made a challenge for the IWGP Intercontinental Championship, which was promptly accepted by Nakamura. The title match was officially announced in a press conference two days later. Styles was pulled from NJPW's end-of-the-year World Tag League due to a back injury, but it was announced that he would be returning at Wrestle Kingdom 10. This would mark the first singles match between Nakamura and Styles with the two having previously only met in tag team matches in August 2008 and November 2015.

Both of NJPW's junior heavyweight titles were also defended at Wrestle Kingdom 10. In the IWGP Junior Heavyweight Championship match, Kenny Omega was set to defend against Kushida in the third title match between the two. The first took place on July 5, 2015, at Dominion 7.5 in Osaka-jo Hall, where Kushida, the winner of the 2015 Best of the Super Juniors tournament, defeated Omega to win the title. A rematch took place on September 23 at Destruction in Okayama, where Omega regained the title with help from his Bullet Club stablemates. On November 1, Kushida challenged Omega to a "one more match", which was made official for Wrestle Kingdom 10 on November 9. The IWGP Junior Heavyweight Tag Team Championship would be defended in a four-way match, where the reigning champions reDRagon (Bobby Fish and Kyle O'Reilly) were set to take on Matt Sydal and Ricochet, Roppongi Vice (Baretta and Rocky Romero) and The Young Bucks (Matt Jackson and Nick Jackson). Sydal and Ricochet earned their title shot on November 7 by defeating Roppongi Vice to win the 2015 Super Jr. Tag Tournament. However, after the match both Roppongi Vice and The Young Bucks also laid their own claims on a title match with reDRagon. Roppongi Vice had eliminated the reigning IWGP Junior Heavyweight Tag Team Champions from the tournament, while The Young Bucks felt they deserved a rematch with reDRagon, having lost the title to them on August 16. This led to NJPW announcing a title match with all four teams on November 9.

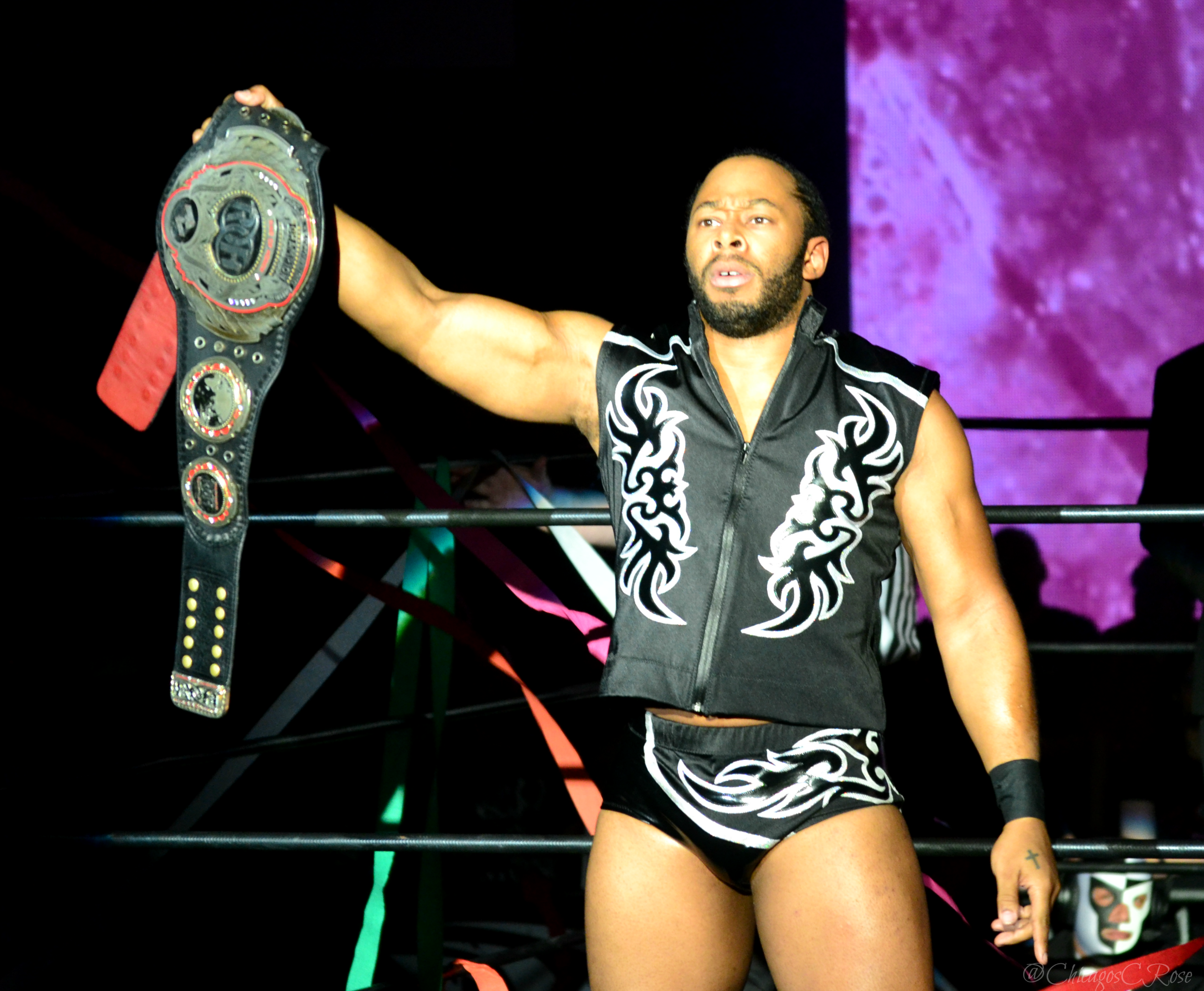
Ring of Honor (ROH) World Champion Jay Lethal, who made his NJPW debut at Wrestle Kingdom 10

Wrestle Kingdom 10 also featured a match for the IWGP Tag Team Championship with Bullet Club's Doc Gallows and Karl Anderson defending against G.B.H. (Togi Makabe and Tomoaki Honma). Makabe and Honma earned their title shot on December 9 by defeating Los Ingobernables de Japón (Evil and Tetsuya Naito) to win the 2015 World Tag League. That same day ROH World Champion Jay Lethal appeared in a video, requesting a challenger for a title match at Wrestle Kingdom 10. The challenge was accepted that same night by Michael Elgin, an ROH wrestler who had taken part in the World Tag League. Elgin had made his NJPW debut during the previous summer's 2015 G1 Climax, quickly becoming a fan favorite. The following day, NJPW backtracked on the title match announcement, instead announcing a "special singles match" between the two with the possibility of it being turned into a title match, provided that Lethal was still the champion on January 4. ROH had previously announced that Lethal would defend the title against A.J. Styles on December 18 at Final Battle. Elgin had earned the title shot by winning ROH's Survival of the Fittest tournament on November 14, stating afterwards that he wanted his shot in Japan. The match continues a working relationship between NJPW and the American ROH promotion, which started in 2014 and was set to continue later in 2016 with ROH holding shows in Japan and NJPW holding shows in North America. On December 18, Lethal retained the ROH World Championship against A.J. Styles, making the title match official for Wrestle Kingdom 10.

The rest of the matches for Wrestle Kingdom 10 were announced on December 10, including the seventh title match of the event, with Tomohiro Ishii defending the NEVER Openweight Championship against Katsuyori Shibata. This match stemmed from the World Tag League, where Shibata pinned Ishii on both the opening and final day. This would mark Shibata's first ever NEVER Openweight Championship match. Another match stemming from the World Tag League saw Tetsuya Naito face Hirooki Goto, whom he pinned during the tournament. The feud between them had been going on since late 2015, though Naito had been more involved with Goto's tag team partner Katsuyori Shibata, while his Los Ingobernables de Japón stablemate Evil had been paired off with Goto. However, Shibata was abruptly taken out of the feud to challenge for the NEVER Openweight Championship, leaving Goto to face off with Naito. NJPW implied that the winner of the match could be in line for a title shot. Also announced was the Bullet Club trio of Bad Luck Fale, Tama Tonga and Yujiro Takahashi taking on Toru Yano and two mystery partners and the second annual New Japan Rumble, occurring on the pre-show. On December 19, Yano's partners were revealed as the ROH tag team The Briscoes (Jay and Mark). Two days later, NJPW announced that the match would be contested for the newly created NEVER Openweight 6-Man Tag Team Championship.

== Event ==
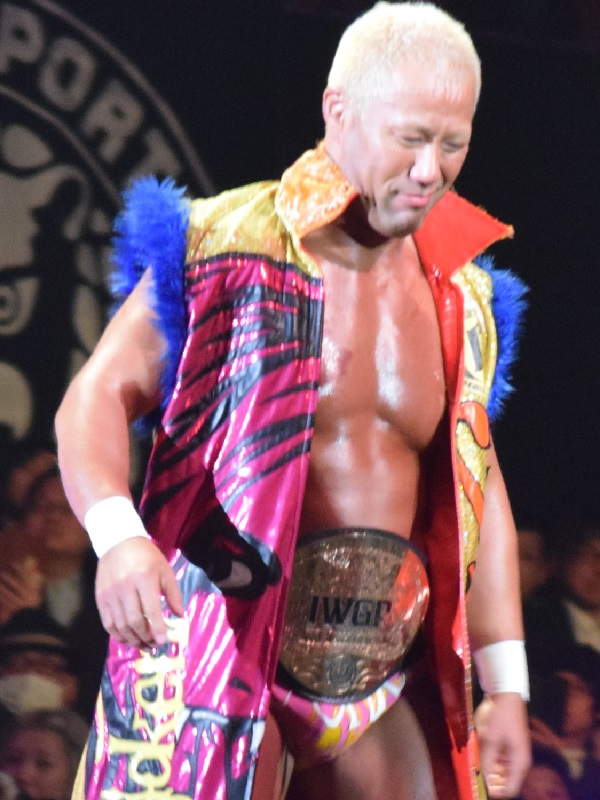
Tomoaki Honma, who won his first NJPW title, the IWGP Tag Team Championship, at Wrestle Kingdom 10

The pre-show featured the New Japan Rumble. Prior to the event, NJPW had announced eight participants for the match, but the match ended up featuring 18 wrestlers. Surprise entrants included the debuting ROH wrestler Cheeseburger, veteran wrestlers The Great Kabuki, Hiro Saito, King Haku, Shiro Koshinaka and Yoshiaki Fujiwara and Kazushi Sakuraba, who entered the match less than a week after being defeated by Shinya Aoki in a mixed martial arts fight. In the end, Jado, who was accompanied by Momoiro Clover Z member Momoka Ariyasu, eliminated Ryusuke Taguchi to win the match.

In the opening match of Wrestle Kingdom 10, The Young Bucks defeated defending champions reDRagon, Roppongi Vice and the team of Matt Sydal and Ricochet in a four-way match to win the IWGP Junior Heavyweight Tag Team Championship for the fourth time. In the second match, Toru Yano and the debuting Jay and Mark Briscoe became the inaugural NEVER Openweight 6-Man Tag Team Champions with a win over Bullet Club's Bad Luck Fale, Tama Tonga and Yujiro Takahashi. In the third match of the event, Jay Lethal retained the ROH World Championship, pinning Michael Elgin after hitting him with his manager Truth Martini's book and a Lethal Injection.

In the fourth match of the event, Kushida won the IWGP Junior Heavyweight Championship for the third time by defeating Kenny Omega. Next up, G.B.H. (Togi Makabe and Tomoaki Honma) defeated Bullet Club (Doc Gallows and Karl Anderson) to win the IWGP Tag Team Championship, marking Honma's first ever title win in NJPW. In the only non-title match of the event, Hirooki Goto defeated Tetsuya Naito, despite outside interference from Naito's Los Ingobernables de Japón stablemates Bushi and Evil.

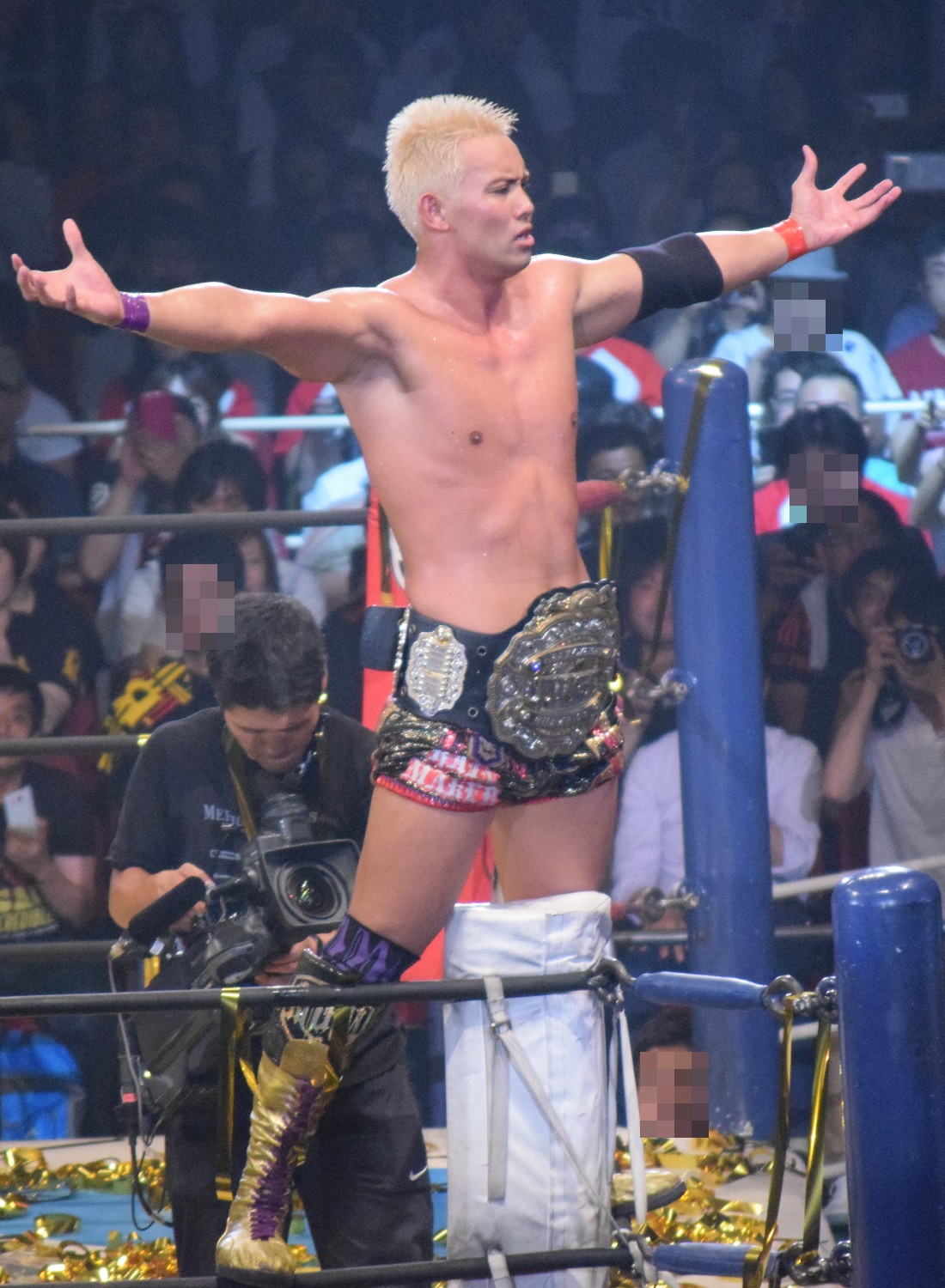
Kazuchika Okada, who retained the IWGP Heavyweight Championship in the main event and becoming the new ace of the promotion

In the seventh match of Wrestle Kingdom 10, Katsuyori Shibata won his first singles title in NJPW by defeating Tomohiro Ishii for the NEVER Openweight Championship. In the first ever singles match between Shinsuke Nakamura and A.J. Styles, Nakamura was victorious, retaining the IWGP Intercontinental Championship. After the match, Nakamura and Styles showed respect to one another with a fist bump. Finally, in the main event Kazuchika Okada defeated 2015 G1 Climax winner Hiroshi Tanahashi to retain the IWGP Heavyweight Championship, marking his first ever Tokyo Dome win over Tanahashi and ending Tanahashi's Tokyo Dome main event win streak at five.

== Reception ==
The event drew 25,204 fans to the Tokyo Dome, down from the previous year's announced attendance of 36,000.

Dave Meltzer of the Wrestling Observer Newsletter called the main event "incredible", stating that it felt like a "classic passing of the torch" from Tanahashi to Okada. Overall, Meltzer called the show "fantastic", particularly praising the last three matches, although noting that he felt the show could not match the previous year's Wrestle Kingdom 9. He gave the main event a perfect five-star rating, the semi main event four and three quarter stars and the NEVER Openweight Championship match four and a half stars out of five. At the end of the year, readers of the publication voted Wrestle Kingdom 10 the "Best Major Wrestling Show" of the year, while naming the main event the Pro Wrestling Match of the Year.

James Caldwell of Pro Wrestling Torch stated that Wrestle Kingdom 10 was a "perfect example of how to build a card, especially leading to the final three matches with Shibata vs. Ishii hitting four-stars-plus, Nakamura vs. Styles going a little higher, and Tanahashi vs. Okada closing in epic fashion". He gave the main event a perfect five-star rating. Sean Radican of the same site gave the show an overall score of 10.0, stating that "the quality of the big matches on the card more than delivered", while acknowledging that it was a "flawed show in some ways". Mike Johnson of Pro Wrestling Insider stated that Wrestle Kingdom 10 was "far superior" to the previous year's Wrestle Kingdom 9. Larry Csonka of 411Mania gave the event a rating of 9.25, calling it "excellent", stating that the final three matches "brought the show to another level". He, however, also criticized the first part of the show for its "lazy booking", noting how the first six matches all featured outside interference or weapon attacks with several also kicking off with pre-match attacks.

== Aftermath ==
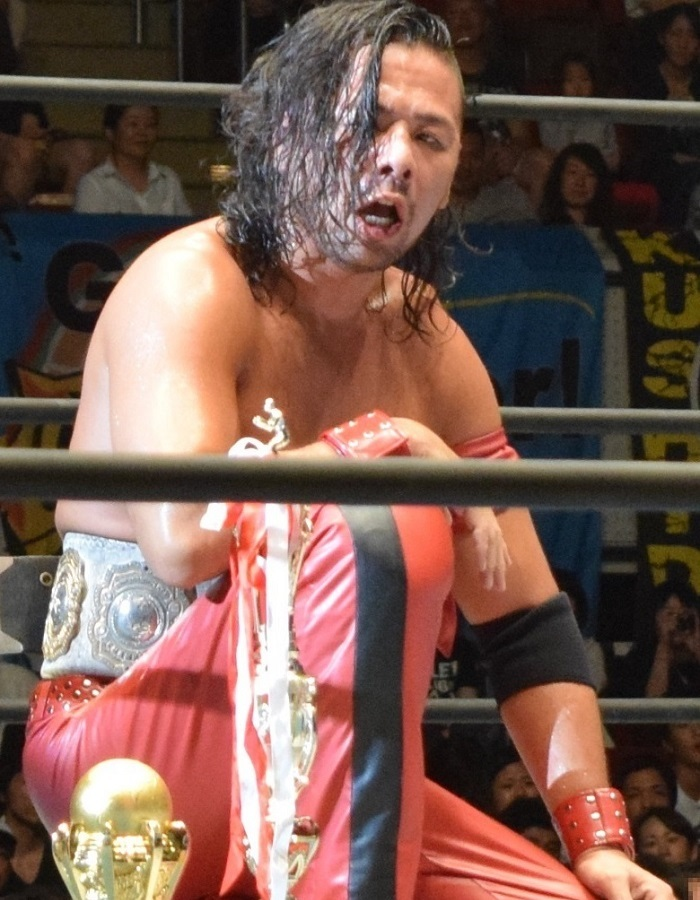
Shinsuke Nakamura, who gave his notice to NJPW the day of Wrestle Kingdom 10, leaving the promotion only weeks later

Hours after the event had concluded, it was reported by multiple sources that A.J. Styles, Doc Gallows, Karl Anderson and Shinsuke Nakamura had all given their notice to NJPW on the morning of January 4, announcing that they were leaving the promotion and joining WWE. The notices reportedly led to no finishes of matches being changed by booker Gedo. The following day, the rest of Bullet Club turned on Styles, kicking him out of the stable with Kenny Omega assuming leadership of the stable. Omega was also set up as the next challenger for Shinsuke Nakamura's IWGP Intercontinental Championship. This marked Styles' final appearance for NJPW. Meanwhile, the other three were involved in angles setting up future title matches. Anderson and Nakamura remained under NJPW contracts and were expected to finish off their contracted dates with the promotion before leaving. On January 5, WWE released an article on its official website, discussing the rumors of Styles, Nakamura, Anderson and Gallows joining the promotion. The following day, Nakamura confirmed in an interview with Tokyo Sports that he would be leaving NJPW at the end of the month and signing with WWE. Styles officially made his WWE debut on January 24, 2016, at the Royal Rumble. Nakamura wrestled his final NJPW match on January 30, making his NXT debut two months later on April 1. The departures led to NJPW scrapping its one-year contract system and starting to offer their wrestlers multi-year contracts. In 2018, at WWE's Royal Rumble, Nakamura won the 2018 Men's Royal Rumble match to earn a World title match at WrestleMania, he chose a WWE Championship match against the champion at that time, AJ Styles (who had retained the title against Kevin Owens and Sami Zayn earlier in the night). At WrestleMania, Styles defeated Nakamura to retain the championship. After the match, Nakamura turned heel and attacked Styles. After WrestleMania, the two continued to feud through Greatest Royal Rumble and Backlash with their matches ending in draws. At Money in the Bank, Styles retained the WWE Championship by defeating Nakamura in a Last Man Standing match, ending their feud.

The following month's New Beginning events featured several matches stemming from Wrestle Kingdom 10 in Tokyo Dome. The New Beginning in Osaka on February 11 featured two rematches from the show, where Bad Luck Fale, Tama Tonga and Yujiro Takahashi defeated Jay Briscoe, Mark Briscoe and Toru Yano to capture the NEVER Openweight 6-Man Tag Team Championship and Katsuyori Shibata successfully defended the NEVER Openweight Championship against Tomohiro Ishii. Also during the event, Matt Sydal and Ricochet won the IWGP Junior Heavyweight Tag Team Championship by defeating The Young Bucks and reDRagon in a three-way match, while the main event featured Kazuchika Okada successfully defending the IWGP Heavyweight Championship against Hirooki Goto. Three days later at The New Beginning in Niigata, the Briscoes and Yano defeated Fale, Tonga and Takahashi in the third title match between the two teams to regain the NEVER Openweight 6-Man Tag Team Championship. The event also featured Kushida successfully defending the IWGP Junior Heavyweight Championship against Bushi and Togi Makabe and Tomoaki Honma successfully defending the IWGP Tag Team Championship in a Wrestle Kingdom 10 rematch against Doc Gallows and Karl Anderson. In the main event of the show, Kenny Omega defeated Hiroshi Tanahashi to capture the vacant IWGP Intercontinental Championship.

In March, Tetsuya Naito won the 2016 New Japan Cup, defeating Hirooki Goto in the final in a rematch from Wrestle Kingdom 10. On April 10 at Invasion Attack, Naito defeated Kazuchika Okada with help from Los Ingobernables de Japón, including the debuting Seiya Sanada, to win the IWGP Heavyweight Championship for the first time in front of a Ryōgoku Kokugikan crowd that was firmly behind him.

One year later, at Wrestle Kingdom 11, Tetsuya Naito retained the IWGP Intercontinental Championship against Hiroshi Tanahashi, Katsuyori Shibata lost the NEVER Openweight Championship to Hirooki Goto and Hiromu Takahashi defeated Kushida for the IWGP Junior Heavyweight Championship. In the main event, Kazuchika Okada successfully defended the IWGP Heavyweight Championship against 2016 G1 Climax winner Kenny Omega. At 46 minutes and 45 seconds, the main event was the longest match in January 4 Tokyo Dome Show history and was awarded a six-star rating by Dave Meltzer.

== Results ==
No.	Results	Stipulations	Times
1^{P}	Jado (with Momoka Ariyasu) won by last eliminating Ryusuke Taguchi	New Japan Rumble	31:51
2	The Young Bucks (Matt Jackson and Nick Jackson) (with Cody Hall) defeated reDRagon (Bobby Fish and Kyle O'Reilly) (c), Matt Sydal and Ricochet and Roppongi Vice (Baretta and Rocky Romero)	Four-way tag team match for the IWGP Junior Heavyweight Tag Team Championship	16:42
3	Chaos (Jay Briscoe, Mark Briscoe and Toru Yano) defeated Bullet Club (Bad Luck Fale, Tama Tonga and Yujiro Takahashi) (with Shiori)	Six-man tag team match to determine the first NEVER Openweight 6-Man Tag Team Champions	11:34
4	Jay Lethal (c) (with Truth Martini) defeated Michael Elgin	Singles match for the ROH World Championship	12:00
5	Kushida (with Ryusuke Taguchi) defeated Kenny Omega (c) (with Matt Jackson and Nick Jackson)	Singles match for the IWGP Junior Heavyweight Championship	12:48
6	G.B.H. (Togi Makabe and Tomoaki Honma) defeated Bullet Club (Doc Gallows and Karl Anderson) (c) (with Amber Gallows)	Tag team match for the IWGP Tag Team Championship	12:49
7	Hirooki Goto defeated Tetsuya Naito (with Bushi and Evil)	Singles match	12:16
8	Katsuyori Shibata defeated Tomohiro Ishii (c)	Singles match for the NEVER Openweight Championship	17:19
9	Shinsuke Nakamura (c) defeated A.J. Styles	Singles match for the IWGP Intercontinental Championship	24:18
10	Kazuchika Okada (c) (with Gedo) defeated Hiroshi Tanahashi	Singles match for the IWGP Heavyweight Championship	36:01
(c) / – the champion(s) heading into the match; P / – the match was broadcast on the pre-show

=== New Japan Rumble ===
Results
Entry		Elimination		
Order	Name	Order	By	Time
1	Jushin Thunder Liger	5	Unknown	14:57
2	Yoshiaki Fujiwara	2	Multiple wrestlers	10:32
3	Tiger Mask	3	Saito	14:05
4	Cheeseburger	14	Yoshi-Hashi	27:51
5	Hiro Saito	4	Multiple wrestlers	14:27
6	Yoshi-Hashi	15	Taguchi	28:19
7	Máscara Dorada	9	Unknown	23:18
8	Captain New Japan	1	Fujiwara	10:26
9	Manabu Nakanishi	6	Unknown	15:12
10	Yuji Nagata	7	Haku	22:39
11	Satoshi Kojima	8	Haku	22:58
12	Hiroyoshi Tenzan	11	Taguchi and Yoshi-Hashi	24:47
13	Ryusuke Taguchi	17	Jado	31:51
14	Shiro Koshinaka	16	Jado	31:30
15	King Haku	10	Tenzan	24:37
16	The Great Kabuki	12	Disqualification	27:02
17	Kazushi Sakuraba	13	Taguchi	27:19
18	Jado	—	—	Winner

== See also ==
- 2016 in professional wrestling
- Professional wrestling at the Tokyo Dome
