= Matt Sydal =

American professional wrestler (born 1983)

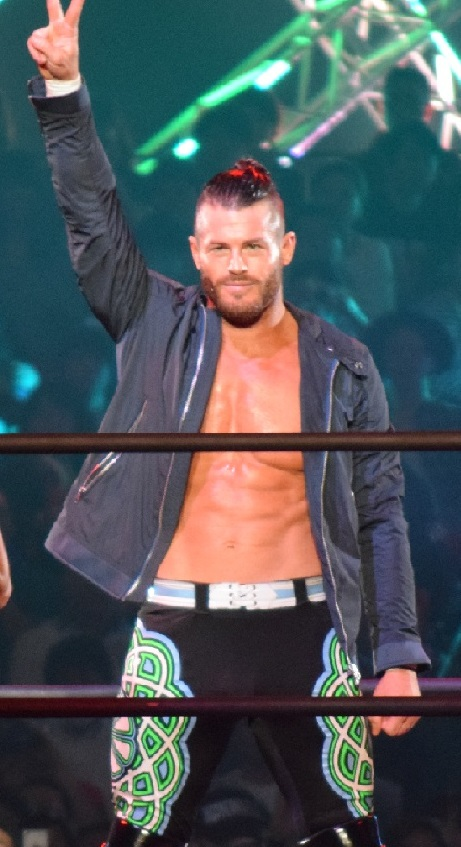
- Sydal in 2015

Personal information
- Born: Matthew Joseph Korklan; March 19, 1983 (age 43) St. Louis, Missouri, U.S.
- Education: University of Missouri

Professional wrestling career
- Ring name(s): Evan Bourne; Lance Sydal; MATT; Matt Sydal; The Vision
- Billed height: 5 ft 8 in (173 cm)
- Billed weight: 165 lb (75 kg)
- Billed from: Clearwater, Florida; St. Louis, Missouri
- Trained by: Gateway Championship Wrestling
- Debut: October 20, 2000

Matthew Joseph Korklan (born March 19, 1983), better known by the ring name Matt Sydal, is an American professional wrestler. He is signed to All Elite Wrestling (AEW), where he is a member of SkyFlight. He is also known for his tenure with WWE from 2008 to 2014 under the ring name Evan Bourne.

Prior to signing with AEW, Sydal wrestled in WWE as Evan Bourne, and was a one-time WWE Tag Team Champion, with Kofi Kingston. Sydal is known for his time in Impact Wrestling where he is a former Impact Grand Champion and Impact X Division Champion, and in Ring of Honor (ROH), where he is a former ROH World Tag Team Champion. He has also wrestled for New Japan Pro-Wrestling (NJPW), where he is a former two-time IWGP Junior Heavyweight Tag Team Champion and a one-time NEVER Openweight 6-Man Tag Team Champion.

Korklan has also wrestled on the independent circuit, for promotions including NWA Midwest, IWA-Mid South, winning both singles and tag team championships. He also wrestled for the short-lived Wrestling Society X . Beginning in 2005, he wrestled for Dragon Gate in Japan, and won the Open the Brave Gate Championship in early 2007.

Korklan is known for his dynamic technical cruiserweight hybrid style of lucha libre and puroresu styles of wrestling and was named the Wrestling Observer Newsletter's Best Flying Wrestler in 2008.

== Professional wrestling career ==
=== Training and independent circuit (2000–2007) ===
Korklan was on his high school wrestling team, he did Taekwondo when he was younger as well. While a senior in high school, Korklan began training with the St. Louis, Missouri-based Gateway Championship Wrestling (GCW) promotion. After three months of training, Korklan began wrestling for GCW in October 2000, becoming the first person under the age of 18 to receive a wrestler's license in Missouri. Prior to this, Korklan had briefly wrestled as Lance Sydal in the backyard wrestling promotion, Saint Peters Wrestling Organization.

In 2003, Korklan (now known as Matt, forgoing a surname) formed a stable in GCW, known as Operation: Shamrock. In addition, Korklan and fellow stable member Billy McNeil formed a tag team. Operation: Shamrock maintained a feud with the villainous Ministry of Hate faction, led by Nikki Strychnine.

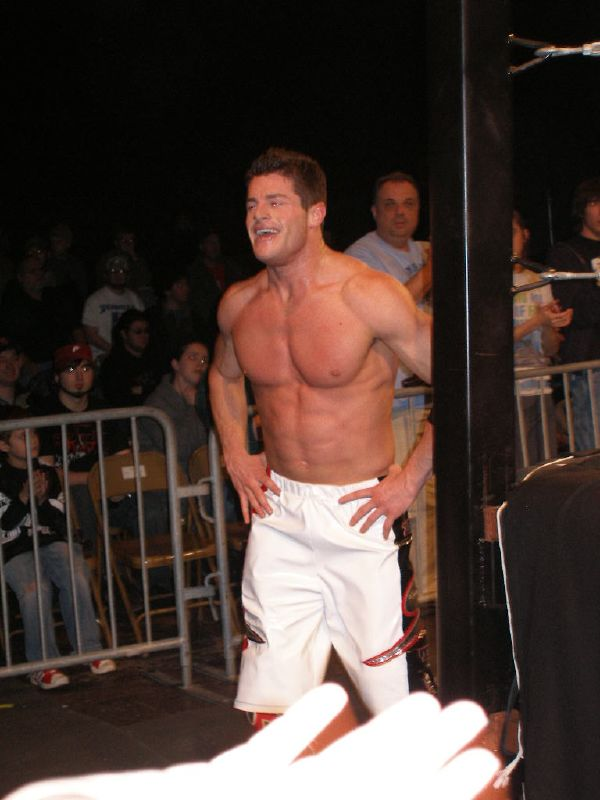
Sydal at a Chikara show in 2007

Korklan debuted in Independent Wrestling Association Mid-South (IWA Mid-South) in November 2003, combining two of his old ring names into a new one, Matt Sydal. He won his first championship, the IWA Mid-South Light Heavyweight Championship, on January 17, 2004, by defeating J.C. Bailey. Sydal lost the title to Delirious on June 26, 2004. Sydal joined NWA Midwest that same year. On July 30, he defeated Justin Kage for the NWA Midwest X Division Championship, which he lost to Delirious after holding it for nearly a year. Sydal teamed with Daizee Haze in an intergender tag team match against Delirious and MsChif, of which the male wrestler on the winning team would become champion. Haze pinned MsChif to win the title for Sydal. Sydal lost the title to Jaysin Strife roughly four months later before leaving the promotion.

Sydal wrestled several top independent stars during his time as a regular in IWA. He lost three matches to A.J. Styles during a short-lived feud. He also faced CM Punk, Chris Sabin and Nate Webb. On September 24, 2005, Sydal won the fifth Ted Petty Invitational tournament, defeating El Generico, Tyler Black, and Sabin to reach the final match, where he defeated Kevin Steen and Arik Cannon.

=== Total Nonstop Action Wrestling (2003–2005) ===
Sydal wrestled on Total Nonstop Action Wrestling (TNA)'s first monthly pay-per-view event, Victory Road. He participated in a twenty-man X Division Gauntlet for the Gold match. Sydal was a candidate in an online poll to determine who would meet Christopher Daniels for the TNA X Division Championship at Sacrifice, but was not chosen.

=== Ring of Honor (2004–2007) ===
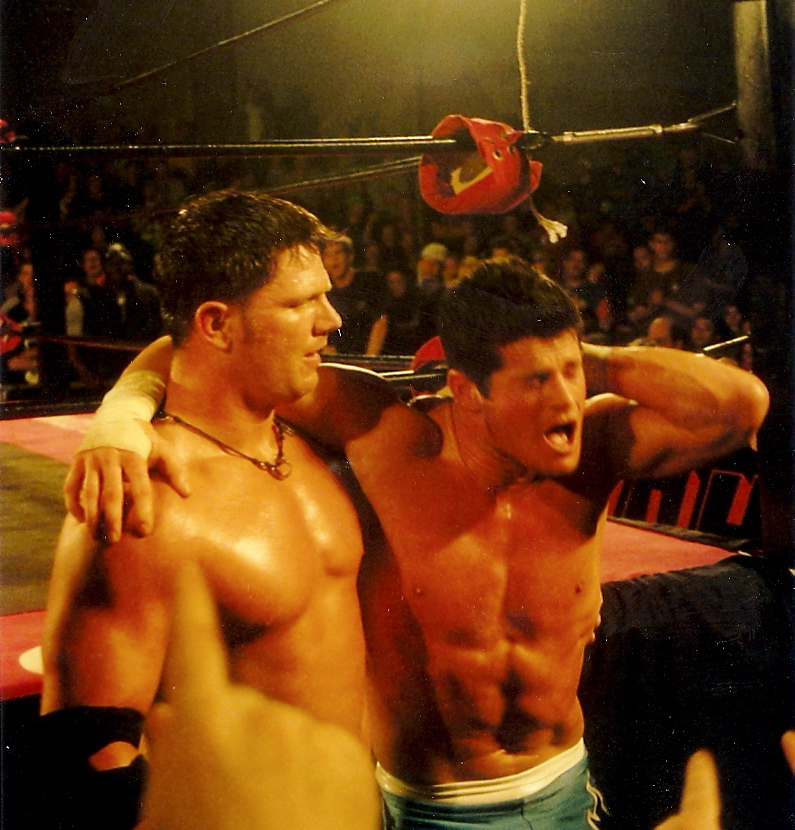
Sydal with A.J. Styles (left) in Ring of Honor during 2006

Sydal (along with his valet, Daizee Haze) debuted in Ring of Honor at Reborn: Stage One on April 23, 2004, defeating his nemesis, Delirious. Following a brief feud with Trent Acid, Sydal teamed with Fast Eddie Vegas as The Air Devils, a name chosen by ROH fans. They only teamed once, on February 25, 2005, at 3rd Anniversary: Part 2, defeating The Ring Crew Express. After the match, Vegas turned on Sydal and joined the heel stable, The Embassy. On August 12, Sydal and Haze joined Austin Aries, Roderick Strong and Jack Evans in Generation Next, a stable in the midst of a feud with The Embassy. In late 2005, Haze turned on Sydal, leaving him and Generation Next and joining The Embassy. Generation Next fought The Embassy in several multi-man tag matches, culminating in a Steel Cage Warfare match on December 3, which Generation Next won.

After wrestling A.J. Styles at Hell Freezes Over, the two teamed to unsuccessfully challenge Sydal's Generation Next stablemates, Austin Aries and Roderick Strong, for the ROH World Tag Team Championship. Sydal also teamed with Samoa Joe and Jack Evans to chase the title. Sydal went to the finals of the 2006 Survival of the Fittest tournament, before losing to Delirious. Sydal and Delirious renewed their rivalry in ROH, wrestling several matches in mid-2006.

After several matches against each other in 2006, Sydal teamed with Christopher Daniels in another attempt to win the ROH World Tag Team Championship. They feuded with the champions, The Kings of Wrestling, before winning the championship at Dethroned. Sydal and Daniels successfully defended the title against CIMA and Shingo, and former champions Austin Aries and Roderick Strong, before losing it to The Briscoe Brothers at the Fifth Year Festival: Chicago. During their title reign, Sydal developed a cocky, heelish attitude. After unsuccessful attempts (with Claudio Castagnoli) to regain the title, Sydal joined Larry Sweeney's heel stable Sweet n' Sour Inc. (which also included Chris Hero, Sara Del Rey and Tank Toland). At Man Up, Sydal wrestled his final match for ROH, losing to long-time rival Delirious.

=== Dragon Gate and Wrestling Society X (2006–2007) ===
Sydal began touring Japan with Dragon Gate in May 2006. There, he aligned with CIMA, Don Fuji, and Jack Evans to form the stable New Blood Generation International. He also became a part of CIMA's Typhoon stable. At Wrestlejam, Sydal teamed with Generation Next stablemate Roderick Strong to win the $10,000 Tag Team Challenge.

On February 12, 2007, Sydal won the Dragon Gate Open the Brave Gate Championship from Masato Yoshino, becoming the first gaijin to hold the championship. He held it for just over a month, successfully defending it against Yoshino in Hyogo and against Austin Aries at Ring of Honor's Fifth Year Festival: Dayton. He dropped the title to Genki Horiguchi on March 25.

Sydal was a part of the short-lived MTV promotion, Wrestling Society X, where he competed as a heel against Jack Evans, Scorpio Sky and the Human Tornado. He began a feud with Syxx-Pac over Sydal's valet and on-screen girlfriend Lizzy Valentine, but WSX folded before they ever had a match.

=== World Wrestling Entertainment/WWE (2007–2014) ===
==== Developmental territories (2007–2008) ====
Following the expiration of his WSX contract and the close of the promotion, Korklan signed a developmental contract with World Wrestling Entertainment (WWE). Sydal debuted in Ohio Valley Wrestling (OVW) at its October 10, 2007 TV taping, defeating Jamin Olivencia. In December, Sydal defeated Mike Kruel to win the OVW Heavyweight Championship. On February 7, 2008, WWE announced it had ended its affiliation with OVW. As a result, Sydal lost the OVW Heavyweight Championship to Jay Bradley.

Sydal joined WWE's new developmental territory Florida Championship Wrestling, debuting on March 22, 2008, and defeating TJ Wilson. He was then called up to WWE's main roster.

==== Singles competition (2008–2011) ====
Sydal made his debut for the ECW brand on June 3, 2008, as a face character. He lost a match by countout to Shelton Benjamin, after he was thrown at guest commentator Kofi Kingston. The following week on ECW, he was renamed as Evan Bourne, and teamed with Kofi Kingston to defeat Benjamin and Mike Knox. In the following weeks, Bourne defeated Matt Striker, Nunzio, and Chavo Guerrero Jr., using the shooting star press as his finishing maneuver.

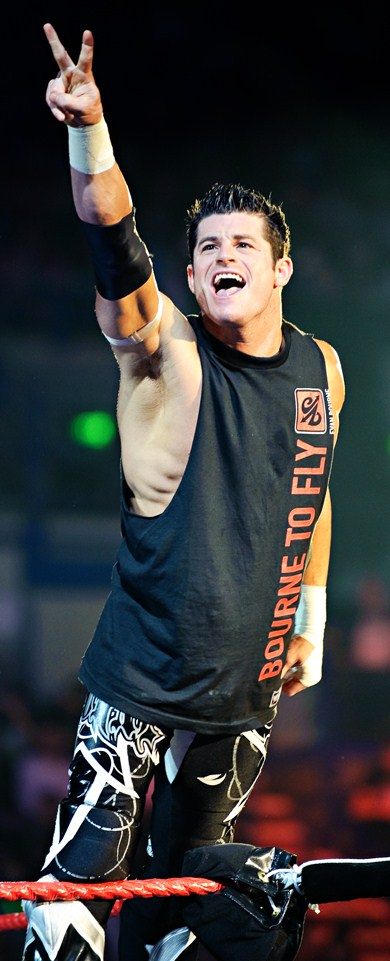
Bourne making his ring entrance on an episode of ECW

At Cyber Sunday in October, WWE fans chose Bourne to face Matt Hardy for the ECW Championship. He was pinned after Hardy performed a Twist of Fate on him. Two days later, during a six-man tag match on ECW, Bourne landed a dive from the ring on his right ankle, dislocating it and tearing his deltoid ligament. Surgery was not necessary, but Bourne was not medically cleared to return to the ring until March 17. On December 8, he won the "Best Finishing Maneuver" Slammy award for his shooting star press.

On June 29, Bourne was traded to the Raw brand, and made his debut that night as the first of three wrestlers in a Gauntlet match against WWE Champion Randy Orton. On the November 2 episode of Raw, Bourne lost a United States Championship match to The Miz. On the December 29 episode of ECW, he defeated Mike Knox in an "ECW Homecoming" match to qualify for the "Homecoming Battle Royal", which would decide the opponent for ECW Champion Christian at the Royal Rumble.

Bourne lost a non-title match to WWE Champion Sheamus on the January 4, 2010, episode of Raw. The following week on ECW, he competed in the "Homecoming Battle Royal" but was the first man eliminated. On the March 8 episode of Raw, he defeated William Regal to qualify for the Money in the Bank ladder match at WrestleMania XXVI, which was won by Jack Swagger.

The May 31, 2010 episode of Raw opened with Bourne being assaulted by Edge, after Bourne proposed Edge put his spot in the WWE Championship match at Fatal 4-Way on the line in a match. Later in the show, John Cena chose Bourne to replace his scheduled tag team partner, Randy Orton (who was earlier "injured" by Edge), in a match against Edge and Sheamus. Bourne pinned Sheamus to earn the victory for his team. Two weeks later, Bourne defeated Chris Jericho by disqualification. Jericho had threatened the referee and attacked Bourne while he was in the ropes. At Fatal 4-Way, he pinned Jericho in a rematch. The following night on Raw, Jericho challenged Bourne to a third match, stating he would leave WWE if he lost; Jericho pinned Bourne to win the match and stay with the company. On the July 5 Raw, Bourne teamed with Randy Orton to defeat Jericho and Edge. Bourne competed in the Money in the Bank ladder match at Money in the Bank on July 18, but lost.

On September 19, at Night of Champions, Bourne teamed with Mark Henry in the Tag Team Turmoil match for the WWE Tag Team Championship. They were the final team eliminated, by Drew McIntyre and Cody Rhodes. On the October 11 Raw, he lost a match (to decide who would be on Team Raw at Bragging Rights) to CM Punk, and was subsequently assaulted. This assault was the storyline reason to remove Bourne from television. In reality, he had shoulder surgery.

Bourne returned on the February 28, 2011 episode of Raw, defeating Sheamus after Sheamus was attacked by Triple H before the match. On May 23, he began feuding with Jack Swagger, with the two trading victories on several episodes of Raw. Bourne then defeated Swagger at WWE Capitol Punishment to end the feud.

==== Air Boom, injury and departure (2011–2014) ====
On the August 22, 2011, episode of Raw, Bourne won his first championship in WWE. He and Kofi Kingston defeated David Otunga and Michael McGillicutty for the WWE Tag Team Championship. On the August 29 Raw, the team was named Air Boom and made their first title defense, defeating Otunga and McGillicutty in a rematch. At Night of Champions, Air Boom retained the title against The Awesome Truth when The Miz was disqualified for attacking the referee. At both Hell in a Cell and Vengeance, Air Boom retained the title against Dolph Ziggler and Jack Swagger.

On November 1, WWE announced it had suspended Korklan for 30 days for his first violation of the company's wellness policy. Bourne returned to television on December 5. On December 18, at TLC: Tables, Ladders & Chairs, Air Boom retained the Tag Team Championship by defeating Primo & Epico. On January 15, 2012, Air Boom lost the WWE Tag Team Championship to Primo and Epico at a house show. The following night on Raw, Air Boom was awarded a rematch, but failed to regain the championship. This would be Korklan's final appearance on primary WWE programming. One day after that, Korklan received a 60-day suspension for his second failure of a wellness test.

In March 2012, Korklan was involved in a motorcycle accident which broke his foot in four places and dislocated it in five. This same injury would warrant corrective surgery and hiatus later in his career as well, due to the severity of the fractures.

After a year-long absence, Bourne returned on March 28, 2013, at a NXT live event, defeating Sami Zayn in what would be his final WWE match. After making no appearances for over a year, WWE announced that Bourne had been released from his contract on June 12, 2014, ending his six-year tenure with the promotion.

Korklan revealed in a 2020 interview that he received an offer to return to the company to compete in the 2016 Cruiserweight Classic but declined.

=== Return to ROH (2014–2017) ===
Sydal made his return to Ring of Honor on September 27, 2014, losing to A.J. Styles at the Ring of Honor Wrestling television tapings. In November, he was part of the 2014 Survival of the Fittest tournament, won by Adam Cole. He unsuccessfully challenged Jay Lethal for the ROH World Television Championship at Final Battle 2014. At Supercard of Honor IX Sydal defeated Moose, Tommaso Ciampa, Caprice Coleman, Cedric Alexander, and Andrew Everett in a Six-man mayhem match. On August 21, 2015, Sydal defeated New Japan Pro-Wrestling's IWGP Junior Heavyweight Champion Yujiro Kushida in a non-title match, after which Kushida accepted his challenge for a title match. At Survival of the Fittest Sydal was defeated by A. C. H. in 5 match in the Best of 5 Series. The next night Sydal was defeated by A.J. Styles. At Final Battle Sydal teamed with Alex Shelley and A. C. H. and defeated The Addiction and Chris Sabin in a Six-man tag team match. On February 6, Sydal scored an impressive victory over former ROH World Champion Adam Cole. At ROH 14th Anniversary Show Sydal teamed with Kushida and A. C. H. as they were defeated by The Elite (Kenny Omega and The Young Bucks) for the NEVER Openweight 6-Man Tag Team Championship. At Global Wars (2016) Sydal teamed with Kushida and The Motor City Machine Guns and they were defeated by Bullet Club (The Young Bucks, Tama Tonga and Tanga Loa) in an eight-man tag team match. At War Of The Worlds, Sydal was defeated by Hiroshi Tanahashi.

On April 15, 2017, Sydal made his return saving Frankie Kazarian from Marty Scurll and Hangman Page. On May 12, during the third night of the War of the Worlds tour, Sydal was unsuccessful at winning the ROH World Television Championship against Marty Scurll. The match marked Sydal's final appearance for ROH.

=== Pro Wrestling Guerrilla (2014–2017) ===
Sydal made his PWG debut on the second night of Battle of Los Angeles on August 30, 2014, by defeating Chris Hero in the opening round of the namesake tournament. However, Sydal was eliminated from the tournament by Kenny Omega in the quarterfinal round on August 31. At Black Cole Sun, Sydal teamed with Chris Sabin to defeat The Young Bucks. At From Out Of Nowhere, Sydal was defeated by his tag team partner Ricochet. At Don't Sweat The Technique, Sydal and Sabin defeated The Monster Mafia (Ethan Page and Josh Alexander).

At PWG Battle Of Los Angeles 2015 – Night 1 Sydal defeated Fenix in the First Round of the Battle Of Los Angeles, The next night Sydal was defeated by Will Ospreay in the Second round. At PWG All Star Weekend 11 – Night 1 Sydal was unsuccessfully at winning the PWG World Championship against Roderick Strong, The night Sydal was defeated by Trevor Lee. At PWG All Star Weekend 12 – Night 1 Sydal teamed with Ricochet as they were unsuccessfully against The Young Bucks for the PWG World Tag Team Championship.

At PWG Battle Of Los Angeles 2016 – Night 2 Sydal teamed with Ricochet and Will Ospreay as they defeated Adam Cole and The Young Bucks, The match was given a 5 star by Dave Meltzer. At PWG Mystery Vortex IV Sydal defeated Pete Dunne. On March 18, 2017, Sydal and Ricochet was involved in a triple threat tag team for the PWG Tag Team Championship which was won by Penta el 0M & Rey Fenix. On June 16, at Man On The Silver Mountain, Sydal was defeated by Sami Callihan. Sydal entered the 2017 Battle Of Los Angeles being eliminated in the first round by Penta El Zero M. The next day he and Ricochet were defeated by The Leaders Of The New School(Zack Sabre Jr. & Marty Scurll). On night two of PWG All Star Weekend 13, Sydal was defeated by Trent? in a three-way match also including Rey Horus.

=== Return to the independent circuit (2014–present) ===
Sydal became active in the UK scene in 2014, most notably in Revolution Pro Wrestling (RevPro), feuding with Will Ospreay. They came up short in the bout, when Cima tapped out to Yoshino. After another year away from Dragon Gate, Sydal made a surprise return to the promotion on June 28, 2015. On July 20, Sydal and Ricochet unsuccessfully challenged Naruki Doi and Yamato for the Open the Twin Gate Championship.

On February 7, 2015, Sydal debuted for Family Wrestling Entertainment (FWE), unsuccessfully challenging Paul London for the FWE Tri-Borough Championship. On October 3, 2015, at a show in South Korea, Sydal briefly held the PWF Lord Of The World Championship, defeating Namsuk Kim, before being defeated in an immediate rematch. This was his first singles championship since leaving WWE.

In March 2018, Sydal competed in Westside Xtreme Wrestling's 16 Carat Gold 2018 Tournament. He lost in the first round to Lucky Kidd. Sydal competed for the Border City Wrestling Heavyweight Title in a fatal four-way that included Cody Deaner, Johnny Impact and Kongo Kong. This took place at the October 6, 2018 BCW/Impact Wrestling event BCW 25th Anniversary. At All American Wrestling's event AAW Unstoppable 2018 on November 24, 2018, Sydal teamed with Colt Cabana in a losing effort against David Starr and Eddie Kingston. Sydal would then face Marty Scurll at CWA Christmas Showdown 2018 in San Juan, Puerto Rico.

In November 2018, Sydal took some time off to have surgery to repair torn cartilage in his knee with an estimated recovery time of six months. At the same time, Dave Meltzer of the Wrestling Observer reported that Sydal was no longer signed to Impact Wrestling as of January 1, 2019, and that there was interest from WWE and All Elite Wrestling to sign Sydal. In April 2019, Sydal won the IPWA Heavyweight Championship in a match against Gery Roif at Israeli Pro Wrestling Association's Passover Bash. His next appearance for a major promotion would be at RevPro's Epic Encounter 2019 in May, where he would defeat A-Kid. He has since defended the title against local wrestler Yuval Goldshmit and WWE Hall of Famer "Bad Ass" Billy Gunn.

After over a year of recovery due to an ankle injury, Sydal returned to in-ring competition on July 19, 2025, where he lost to Último Dragón at an independent show in France.

=== Evolve (2014) ===
On August 8, 2014, Sydal made his debut for Evolve, defeating Johnny Gargano. The following night, Sydal unsuccessfully challenged Ricochet for the Open the Freedom Gate Championship in the main-event of Evolve 32.

=== New Japan Pro-Wrestling (2015–2016) ===
On September 23, 2015, Sydal made his debut for NJPW at Destruction in Okayaka, teaming with Hiroshi Tanahashi in a tag team match, where they defeated Bad Luck Fale and Tama Tonga. During the same event, the new IWGP Junior Heavyweight Champion Kenny Omega nominated Sydal as the first challenger for his title. On October 12, at King of Pro-Wrestling, Sydal unsuccessfully challenged Omega for the IWGP Junior Heavyweight Championship. On October 24, Sydal and Ricochet entered the 2015 Super Jr. Tag Tournament, defeating Time Splitters (Alex Shelley and Kushida) in their first round match. On November 1, Sydal and Ricochet defeated The Young Bucks (Matt and Nick Jackson) to advance to the finals of the tournament. On November 7, at Power Struggle, Sydal and Ricochet defeated Roppongi Vice (Beretta and Rocky Romero) in the finals to win the 2015 Super Jr. Tag Tournament. On January 4, 2016, at Wrestle Kingdom 10 in Tokyo Dome, Sydal and Ricochet took part in a four-way match for the IWGP Junior Heavyweight Tag Team Championship, but were defeated by The Young Bucks. On February 11 at The New Beginning in Osaka, Sydal and Ricochet defeated The Young Bucks and reDRagon (Bobby Fish and Kyle O'Reilly) in a three-way match to become the new IWGP Junior Heavyweight Tag Team Champions. They lost the title to Roppongi Vice on April 10 at Invasion Attack 2016, before regaining the title on May 3 at Wrestling Dontaku 2016. Later in the month, Sydal entered the 2016 Best of the Super Juniors. He finished the tournament with five wins and two losses, tied with Ryusuke Taguchi, but failed to advance to the finals due to losing to Taguchi in their head-to-head match. On June 19 at Dominion 6.19 in Osaka-jo Hall, Sydal and Ricochet lost the IWGP Junior Heavyweight Tag Team Championship to The Young Bucks in a four-way elimination match, also involving reDRagon and Roppongi Vice.

On July 3, Sydal and Ricochet teamed up with Satoshi Kojima to defeat The Elite for the NEVER Openweight 6-Man Tag Team Championship. On July 20, Sydal, representing ROH, entered the 2016 Super J-Cup, defeating Kaientai Dojo's Kaji Tomato in his first round match. On August 21, Sydal defeated Will Ospreay in the second round of the tournament, before being eliminated in the semifinals by Pro Wrestling Noah's Yoshinobu Kanemaru. On September 25, Sydal, Ricochet and Kojima were stripped of the NEVER Openweight 6-Man Tag Team Championship due to Sydal failing to make a scheduled title defense at Destruction in Kobe. Sydal missed two shows over three days, officially due to "travel issues". It was later revealed that he had actually been arrested upon entering the country (see below). He was replaced at Destruction in Kobe by David Finlay, who afterwards also took his spot as Ricochet's regular tag team partner. Sydal's profile has since been removed from NJPW official site.

=== Return to Impact Wrestling (2017–2019) ===
==== Championship reigns (2017–2018) ====
Sydal made his return to Impact Wrestling on the April 27, 2017 Impact Wrestling TV taping, defeating Trevor Lee in his first match. On the May 4 episode of Impact Wrestling, Sydal defeated Eddie Edwards and after the match they shook hands. On the May 11 episode of Impact Wrestling, Sydal competed in a fatal four-way match which was won by Andrew Everett. On the June 22 episode of Impact Wrestling, Sydal won The Sony SIX Way X-Division Elimination Match. On the June 29 episode of Impact Wrestling, Sydal and Sonjay Dutt defeated Low-Ki and Trevor Lee.

On the July 6 episode of Impact Wrestling, Sydal defeated Braxton Sutter. On the July 20 episode of Impact Wrestling, Sydal defeated El Hijo del Fantasma and Low Ki in a 3-way dance. On the August 10 episode of Impact Wrestling, Sydal, Alberto El Patrón and Sonjay Dutt lost a six-man tag team match to Lashley, Low-Ki and Trevor Lee. On Augustv 17 at Destination X, Sydal defeated Lashley. On the September 7 episode of Impact Wrestling, Sydal was defeated by Eli Drake in a match for the GFW IMPACT World Heavyweight title.

At Bound for Glory, Sydal competed in a Six-way lucha rules match for the Impact X Division Championship but failed to win the title. On November 10, 2017, Sydal defeated Ethan Carter III to win the Impact Grand Championship. On March 8, 2018, Sydal defeated Taiji Ishimori to win the Impact X Division Championship in a match that Sydal's Grand Championship was also on the line, thus becoming a dual champion. On March 15, it was revealed that Josh Matthews was his "spirit guide" thus allying himself with Matthews and turning him heel. On March 29, Sydal lost the Impact Grand Championship to Austin Aries in a match that Aries' Impact World Championship was also on the line. On April 12 episode of Impact, he attacked Petey Williams during Williams' match with Matthews causing a disqualification loss for Matthews. At Impact Wrestling Redemption, Sydal defeated Petey Williams to retain the Impact X Division Championship.

==== Alliance with Ethan Page and departure (2018–2019) ====
On the April 26 episode of Impact Wrestling, Sydal successfully defended his Impact X Division Championship against Brian Cage by count out. However, Sydal would end up losing the title to Cage at Slammiversary XVI in July. He would lose a rematch for the title at the following episode of Impact Wrestling.

Following his loss he attempted to recruit Rich Swann to be his partner, however Swann denied him. This resulted in a feud between the two. Sydal would beat Swann in their first encounter due to interference from the debuting Ethan Page. Sydal would go on to form a team with Page based around following Sydal's teachings of "seeing through your third eye." Their team would lose to Rich Swann and his surprise partner NWA National Champion Willie Mack at Bound for Glory. On the November 1 episode of Impact Wrestling, Sydal and Page lost a Tag Team Championship match against The Latin American Xchange. Sydal later lost an X-Division championship qualifying match to Page. Korklan left Impact when his contract expired on January 1, 2019.

=== Return to Evolve (2019–2020) ===
On October 25, 2019, it was announced that Sydal would return to Evolve under his WWE ring name "Evan Bourne". Despite speculation, he denied that he would be returning to WWE. On November 9, Sydal was defeated by Leon Ruff due to count out in his return match after Sydal suffered an injury during the match. He returned the next month unsuccessfully challenging A. R. Fox and Leon Ruff for the Evolve Tag Team Championship alongside Andrew Everett.

=== All Elite Wrestling / Ring of Honor (2020–present) ===
At All Out, Sydal was a surprise entrant in the Casino Battle Royale drawing in as the Joker. During the match, Sydal botched his Shooting Star Press finishing move as he slipped on the ropes and landed on his head (kayfabe caused by Michael Nakazawa oiling up the turnbuckle). Despite this, he was able to continue the match and was eventually eliminated by Eddie Kingston. On the September 22 episode of Late Night Dynamite, Sydal faced Shawn Spears in the main event where he was defeated. On the October 6 episode of AEW Dark, Sydal picked up his first victory in AEW when he defeated Michael Nakazawa. On the November 11, 2020 episode of AEW Dynamite, Sydal, who had been on a four match winning streak, fought Brian Cage in a FTW title match, losing for the first time in five matches. On November 17, 2020, after months of appearing at AEW shows despite not being under contract with the company, AEW confirmed that Sydal was now officially signed with the company.

Sydal returned to ROH, now owned by Tony Khan as a sister promotion to AEW, reformed his tag team with Christopher Daniels, defeating The Outrunners (Truth Magnum and Turbo Floyd) on the February 26, 2023 episode of Ring of Honor. On the June 6 episode of Ring of Honor, Sydal defeated Zack Clayton, after the match he challenged ROH World Television Champion Samoa Joe, which he lost.

In June 2024, Sydal underwent surgery on his right foot to address a long-term injury dating back to his 2012 motorcycle accident. In June 2026, Sydal returned to AEW television for the first time in over two years and would join SkyFlight, a stable managed by his former tag team partner Christopher Daniels.

=== Consejo Mundial de Lucha Libre (2024) ===
On March 29, 2024, at Homenaje a Dos Leyendas, Sydal made his Consejo Mundial de Lucha Libre (CMLL) debut as a last minute replacement for Wheeler Yuta , teaming with the Blackpool Combat Club (Bryan Danielson, Claudio Castagnoli, and Jon Moxley) in a losing effort against Volador Jr., Blue Panther, Místico, and Último Guerrero.

== Other media ==
Image Entertainment, Inc. released a DVD titled Before They Were Stars: Matt Sydal: Bourne Is Born on 20 January 2009, which features every match of Korklan's stint in Wrestling Society X in as well as various promos and a music video.

Korklan appeared in four WWE video games: WWE SmackDown vs. Raw 2009 (as DLC), WWE SmackDown vs. Raw 2010, WWE SmackDown vs. Raw 2011, and WWE '12.

== Personal life ==
Korklan's parents are school teachers. He has a younger brother named Mike, who is also a professional wrestler. Korklan attended Parkway West High School near St. Louis. In 2001, Korklan enrolled at the University of Missouri, studying marketing, as he was unsure whether he could earn a living from wrestling. He continued to wrestle, attending college three days a week, while wrestling mid-week and on weekends. He graduated with a bachelor's degree in 2005, and began working as a sales and marketing vice president for a small mailbox company in St. Louis owned by his uncle, he worked there since he was 18 and worked himself up from shopboy to the marketing department and having his own shop, while continuing to wrestle. He resigned around 2006 using his vacation days for his first international tour of the UK.

Korklan was born Jewish. He resides in Clearwater, Florida.

Korklan dealt with self-confidence issues for most of his career. The weekend of his WWE release, he went to an ayahuasca retreat in Peru, which failed to aid his issues. He was next given medicinal Echinopsis pachanoi by a monk; this caused what he has called a "spiritual rebirth". He has studied Buddhism and cites Alan Watts and Ram Das as his spiritual influences. He clarified on RJ City’s YouTube comedy interview show that he does not consider himself a Buddhist, as he does not have any personal dogma, but enjoys studying and, as a student of David Nichtern, he can lead meditation ceremonies.

=== Legal issues ===
On September 23, 2016, Korklan was arrested at the Kansai International Airport under suspicion of marijuana smuggling. According to local authorities, Korklan had 2.12 grams of liquid marijuana hidden within an electronic cigarette. Korklan was convicted in Osaka on October 13. On December 1, it was reported that Korklan had pled guilty to the charges and accepted three years of probation as his sentence. After a verdict the following week, Korklan was released from prison and returned to the United States on December 12.

== Championships and accomplishments ==
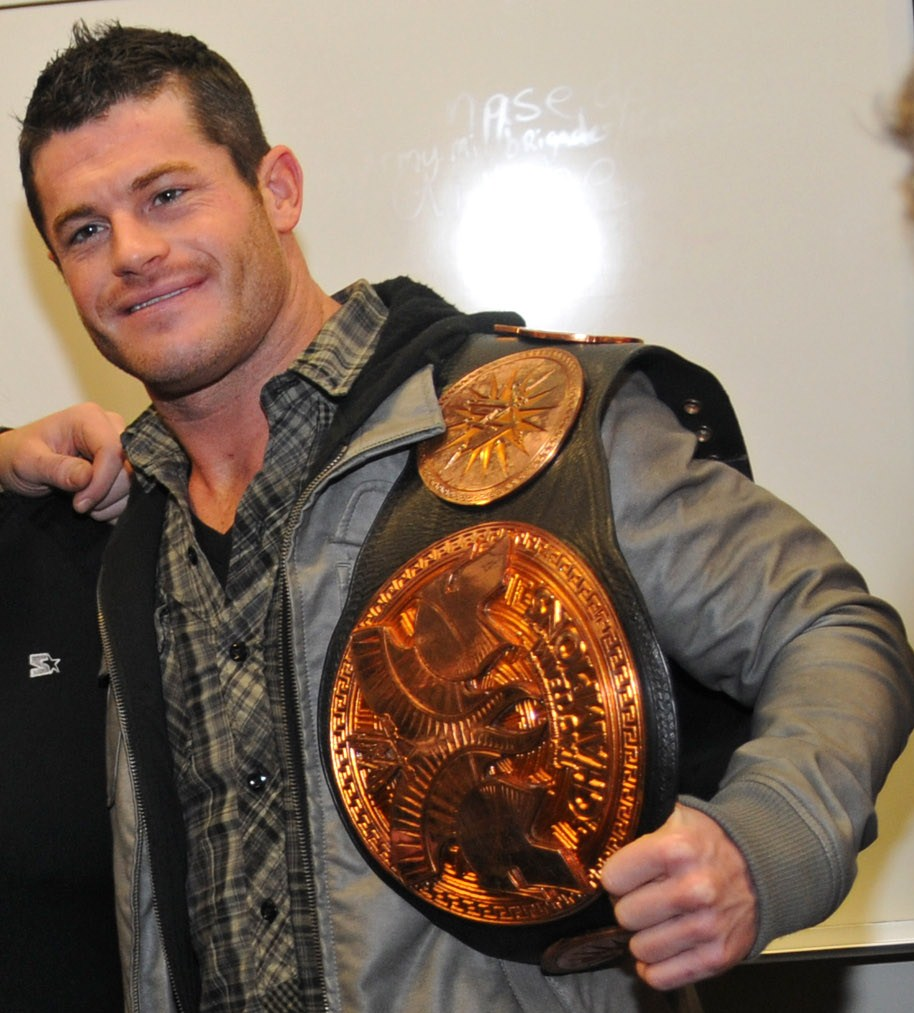
Bourne with the WWE Tag Team Championship belt in December 2011

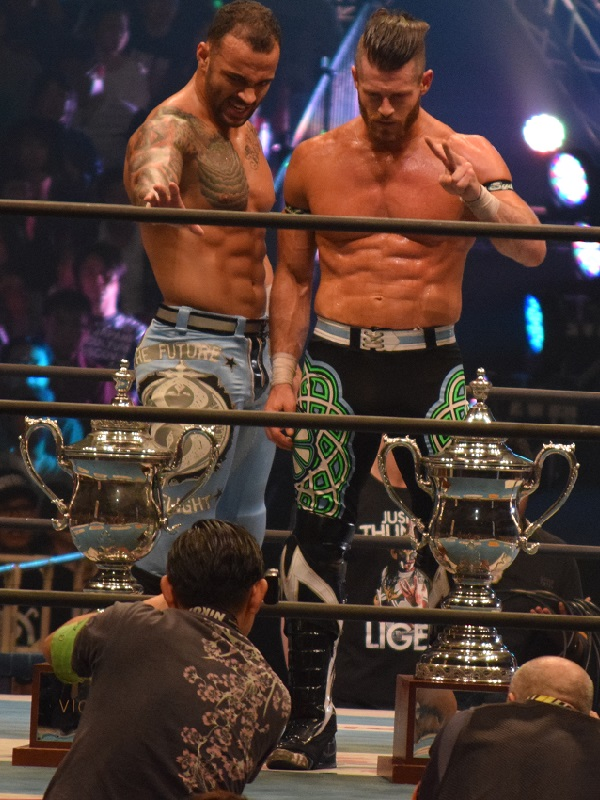
Ricochet and Sydal as the 2015 Super Jr. Tag Tournament winners

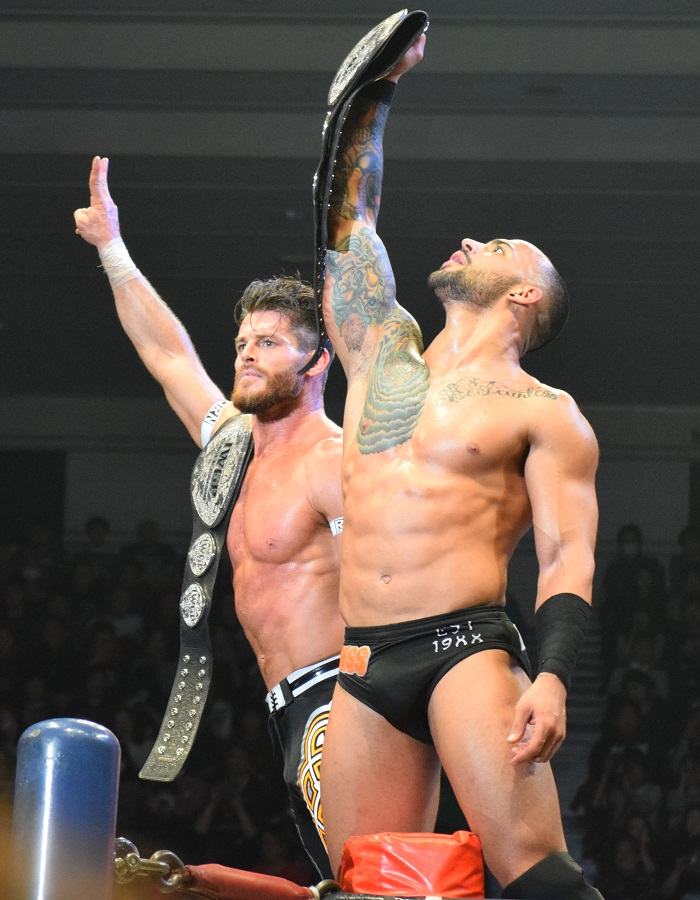
Sydal and Ricochet as the IWGP Junior Heavyweight Tag Team Champions in February 2016

- The Baltimore Sun
  - Newcomer of the Year (2008)
- Dragon Gate
  - Open the Brave Gate Championship (1 time)
- Impact Wrestling
  - Impact Grand Championship (1 time)
  - Impact X Division Championship (1 time)
  - Sony SIX X Division Invitational Trophy (2017)
- Independent Wrestling Association Mid-South
  - IWA Mid-South Light Heavyweight Championship (1 time)
  - Ted Petty Invitational (2005)
- Israeli Pro Wrestling Association
  - IPWA Heavyweight Championship (1 time)
- New Japan Pro-Wrestling
  - IWGP Junior Heavyweight Tag Team Championship (2 times) – with Ricochet
  - NEVER Openweight 6-Man Tag Team Championship (1 time) – with Ricochet and Satoshi Kojima
  - Super Jr. Tag Tournament (2015) – with Ricochet
- NWA Midwest
  - NWA Midwest X Division Championship (2 times)
- Ohio Valley Wrestling
  - OVW Heavyweight Championship (1 time)
- Pro Wrestling Fit
  - PWF Lord Of The World Championship (1 time)
- Pro Wrestling Illustrated
  - Ranked No. 63 of the top 500 singles wrestlers in the PWI 500 in 2009 and 2010
- Ring of Honor
  - ROH World Tag Team Championship (1 time) – with Christopher Daniels
- SoCal Uncensored
  - Match of the Year (2016) with Ricochet and Will Ospreay vs. Adam Cole and The Young Bucks (Matt Jackson and Nick Jackson) on September 3
- World League Wrestling
  - WLW Junior Heavyweight Championship (1 time)
- Westside Xtreme Wrestling
  - Golden Pineapple Tournament (2007) – with Ryo Saito
- World Wrestling Entertainment/WWE
  - WWE Tag Team Championship (1 time) – with Kofi Kingston
  - Slammy Award (1 time)
    - Finishing Maneuver of the Year (2008) – Air Bourne
- Wrestling Observer Newsletter
  - Best Flying Wrestler (2008)
  - Best Wrestling Maneuver (2008) Shooting star press
  - Most Underrated (2009)

== See also ==
- List of Jewish professional wrestlers
