= NEVER Openweight 6-Man Tag Team Championship =

Professional wrestling trios championship

- The NEVER Openweight 6-Man Tag Team Championship belts

Details
- Promotion: New Japan Pro-Wrestling (NJPW)
- Date established: December 21, 2015
- Current champions: Unbound Co. (Yuto-Ice, Oskar, and Jeff Cobb)
- Date won: October 12, 2026
Statistics
- First champions: Chaos (Jay Briscoe, Mark Briscoe and Toru Yano)
- Most reigns: As a team (3 reigns): Los Ingobernables de Japón (Bushi, Evil and Sanada); As an individual (7 reigns): Toru Yano
- Longest reign: Chaos (Hirooki Goto, Tomohiro Ishii and Yoshi-Hashi) (454 days)
- Shortest reign: 1 day: Los Ingobernables de Japón (Bushi, Evil and Sanada); Chaos (Berreta, Tomohiro Ishii and Toru Yano)
- Oldest champion: Minoru Suzuki (54 years, 7 months and 25 days)
- Youngest champion: David Finlay (23 years, 4 months and 9 days)
- Heaviest champion: Bad Luck Fale (156 kg (344 lb))
- Lightest champion: Taiji Ishimori (75 kg (165 lb))

The NEVER Openweight 6-Man Tag Team Championship (NEVER無差別級6人タッグ王座, Nebā Musabetsu-kyū Roku-nin Taggu Ōza) is a professional wrestling championship owned by the New Japan Pro-Wrestling (NJPW) promotion. The title was announced on December 21, 2015, with the first champions crowned on January 4, 2016. Through NJPW's relationship with Ring of Honor (ROH), the title has also been defended in the American promotion. The championship is contested for by teams of three wrestlers and is the first title of its kind in the history of NJPW. The title's openweight nature means that both heavyweight and junior heavyweight wrestlers are eligible to challenge for it. The current champions are Unbound Co. (Yuto-Ice, Oskar, and Jeff Cobb), who are in their first reign as a team and individually. They won the title by defeating United Empire (Will Ospreay, Henare, and Great-O-Khan) at King of Pro-Wrestling on October 12, 2026.

== History ==
On December 11, 2015, NJPW announced that at Wrestle Kingdom 10 in Tokyo Dome on January 4, 2016, the Bullet Club trio of Bad Luck Fale, Tama Tonga and Yujiro Takahashi would take on Toru Yano and two mystery partners. Eight days later, Yano revealed his partners as the Ring of Honor (ROH) tag team The Briscoe Brothers (Jay Briscoe and Mark Briscoe). On December 21, NJPW added that the match would be for the newly created NEVER Openweight 6-Man Tag Team Championship, the promotion's first six-man title. The title's name carried the acronym NEVER, which stood for "New Blood", "Evolution", "Valiantly", "Eternal", and "Radical" and was a NJPW-promoted series of events that ran from 2010 to 2012 and featured younger up-and-coming talent and outside wrestlers not signed to the promotion. This is the second title to carry the NEVER name, after the NEVER Openweight Championship, which was introduced in November 2012.

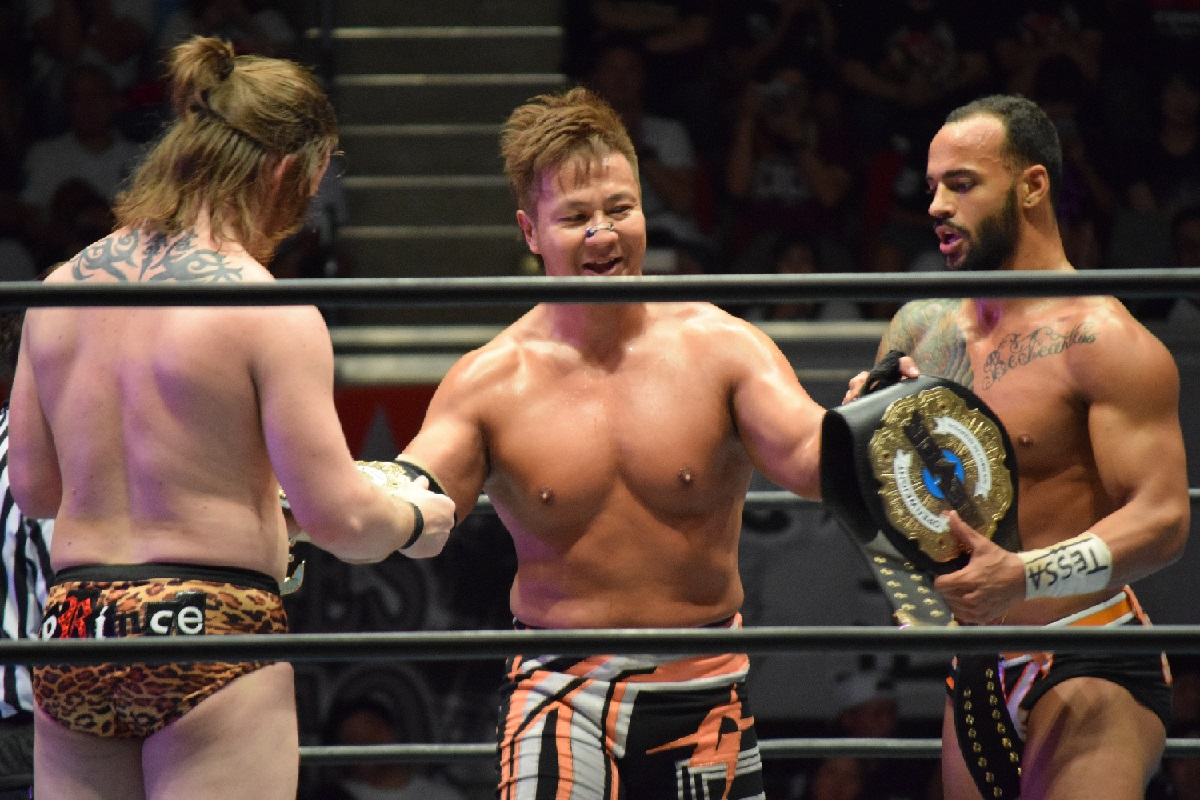
(Left to right) David Finlay, Satoshi Kojima and Ricochet upon winning the title in September 2016

On January 4, 2016, Toru Yano and The Briscoe Brothers defeated Bad Luck Fale, Tama Tonga and Yujiro Takahashi to become the inaugural champions. After losing the title to Fale, Tonga and Takahashi on February 11 at The New Beginning in Osaka, Yano and The Briscoe Brothers also became the first two-time winners of the title, when they regained it three days later at The New Beginning in Niigata. Later that month, the title was defended outside Japan for the first time, when new champions Kenny Omega and The Young Bucks (Matt Jackson and Nick Jackson) successfully defended it against A. C. H., Kushida and Matt Sydal at ROH's 14th Anniversary Show in Las Vegas, Nevada. On September 25, 2016, the title was vacated for the first time due to one of the champions, Matt Sydal, failing to make it to a scheduled championship defense because of "travel issues". NJPW crowned new champions that same day.

On January 4, 2017, at Wrestle Kingdom 11 in Tokyo Dome, the Los Ingobernables de Japón (L.I.J.) trio of Bushi, Evil and Sanada won a four-team gauntlet match to capture the title for the first time. They then began exchanging the title with members of the Taguchi Japan stable, resulting in them becoming record three-time champions on May 3 at Wrestling Dontaku 2017. The quick title changes resulted in the title earning a reputation as a "hot potato", with Japanese media nicknaming it the "short life championship" (短命王座, tanmei ōza). During its first 20 months of existence, the title changed hands 12 times, with no championship team successfully defending it more than two times until L.I.J.'s record-breaking third title reign. The title was also slotted on the undercards of NJPW events and some championship matches took place as early as the second match on a seven-match show with no other title matches. Bushi publicly criticized NJPW's handling of the title, claiming that the booking was costing the title credibility. L.I.J.'s record-setting reign ended on December 17, 2017, when they were defeated by Bullet Club's Bad Luck Fale, Tama Tonga and Tanga Loa in their fourth defense.

== Reigns ==
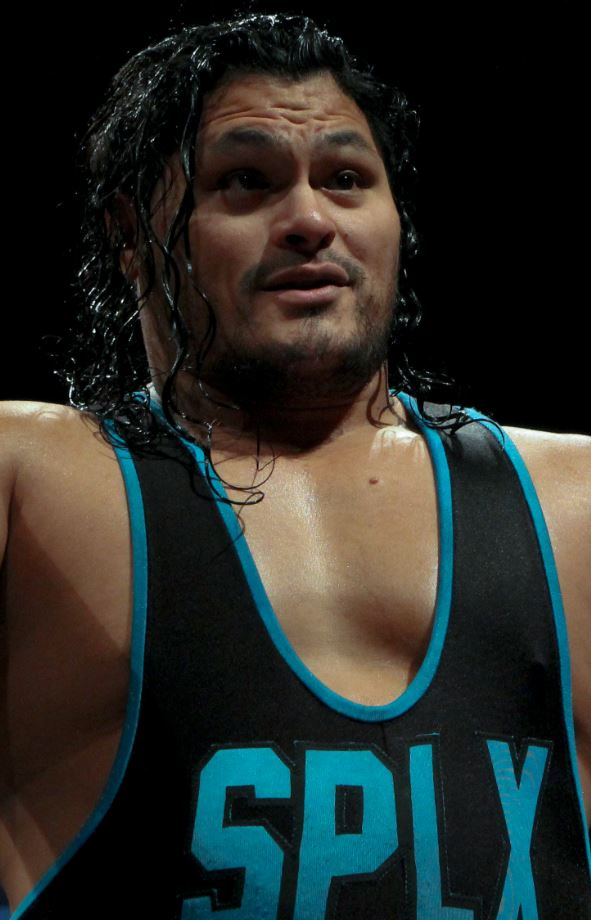
Current champions Unbound Co. (Yuto-Ice, Oskar, and Jeff Cobb)

There have been 35 reigns shared among 50 different wrestlers and 27 teams, with 2 vacancies. Chaos (Jay Briscoe, Mark Briscoe, and Toru Yano) were the inaugural champions. Chaos (Hirooki Goto, Tomohiro Ishii, and Yoshi-Hashi) hold the record for the longest reign and most defenses in an individual reign, while Los Ingobernables de Japón (Bushi, Evil and Sanada) and Chaos (Beretta, Tomohiro Ishii and Toru Yano) both hold the record for the shortest reign in the title's history, with their reigns of one day being the shortest. Los Ingobernables de Japón (Bushi, Evil and Sanada) also hold the record for most reigns as a team with three. In addition to being one-third of the first reign and shortest reign of the titles, Toru Yano holds the record for most reigns by a single wrestler, with seven.

Unbound Co. (Yuto-Ice, Oskar, and Jeff Cobb) are the current champions, in their first reign as a team and individually. They won the title by defeating United Empire (Will Ospreay, Henare, and Great-O-Khan) at King of Pro-Wrestling in Tokyo, Japan, on October 12, 2026.
