= Tomoaki Honma =

Japanese professional wrestler

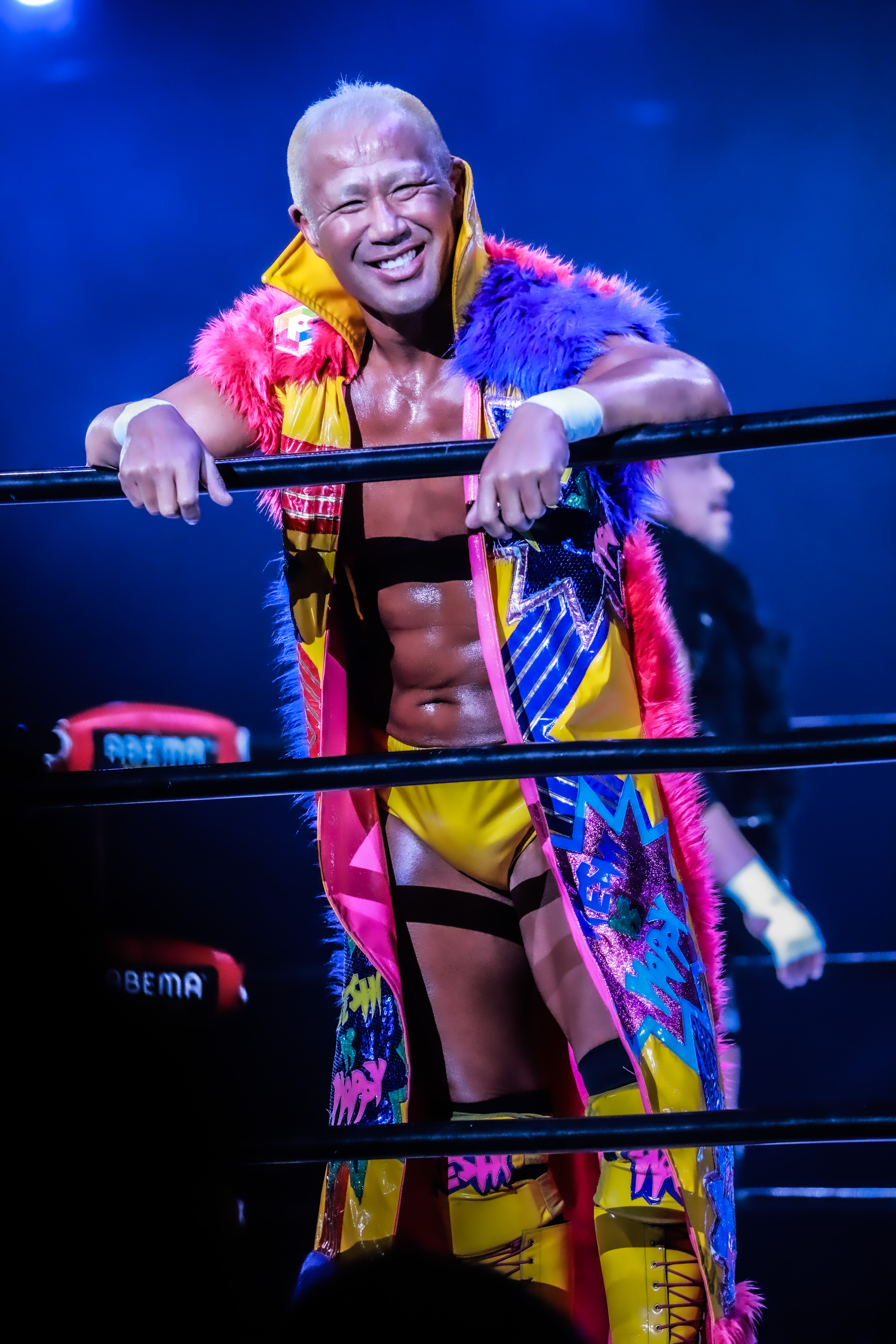
- Honma in 2022

Personal information
- Born: November 18, 1976 (age 49) Higashine, Yamagata, Japan

Professional wrestling career
- Ring name(s): Tomoaki Honma; Makai Masked Canadian
- Billed height: 1.81 m (5 ft 11 in)
- Billed weight: 98 kg (216 lb)
- Trained by: Animal Hamaguchi; Keiji Mutoh
- Debut: May 18, 1997

Tomoaki Honma (本間 朋晃, Honma Tomoaki; born November 18, 1976) is a Japanese professional wrestler primarily working for New Japan Pro-Wrestling (NJPW). In NJPW, he is a former one-time IWGP Tag Team Champion and a two-time World Tag League winner with Togi Makabe.

== Professional wrestling career ==
=== Big Japan Pro Wrestling and All Japan Pro Wrestling (1997–2007) ===
During his second year of high school, Honma initially had aspirations of joining the New Japan Pro-Wrestling (NJPW) dojo and took part in a tryout, but was unsuccessful and sought training elsewhere. He eventually trained with Michinoku Pro Wrestling for 1 year, but did not debut in Michinoku Pro and instead spent his early career in Big Japan Pro Wrestling (BJW), debuting for the promotion in May 1997. After spending time wrestling in opening matches for the promotion, Honma began to compete in BJW's deathmatch division. While a part of BJW, he became the first wrestler to use a lightube in a match, an item that has since become synonymous with deathmatch wrestling worldwide. In October 2000, Honma left BJW after disagreements with company management.

After touring with various independent promotions such as IWA Japan, Onita Pro, and Rainbow Pro, Honma debuted in All Japan Pro Wrestling (AJPW) on November 24, 2001, against Nobukazu Hirai. Honma was invited by owner Motoko Baba to join the promotion and signed a full-time contract with the company in March 2002. In February 2003, he formed Turmeric Storm with Kazushi Miyamoto, but the team later disbanded on April 20, 2004, after losing a trial series.

In 2005, Honma became affiliated with Kensuke Sasaki's Kensuke Office agency in an effort to further improve his career. A severe neck injury kept him out of action throughout much of early 2006, but he returned in March of that same year. Honma announced his departure from AJPW on April 28, 2006, and became a freelancer. Throughout 2006, he worked for Pro Wrestling Zero1-Max and King's Road, where he reformed Turmeric Storm with Kazushi Miyamoto. On September 24, 2006, Tomoaki Honma and Jun Kasai won Apache Pro-Wrestling Army's WEW World Tag Team Championship from Takashi Sasaki and Badboy Hido. The team vacated the championship on February 20, 2007.

=== New Japan Pro-Wrestling ===
==== GBH and departure (2006–2013) ====
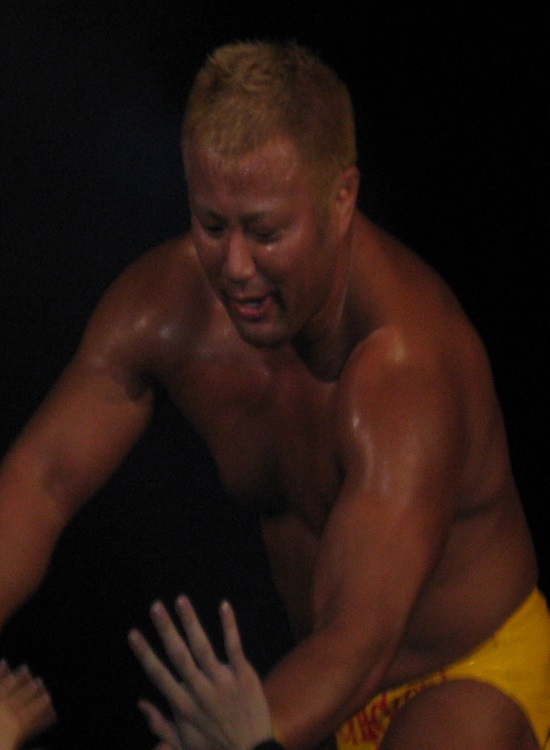
Honma in November 2011

Throughout 2006, Honma appeared in New Japan Pro-Wrestling's (NJPW) Wrestle Land sub-brand as "Makai Masked Canadian", a masked member of the Makai Club faction. Honma participated in the 2007 New Japan Cup tournament, falling to veteran Takashi Iizuka in his first round match. Prior to the match, Honma expressed interest in joining Hiroyoshi Tenzan's GBH faction, and was allowed to join after making a positive impression on Tenzan; however, Tenzan became disenchanted with Honma's difficulty in gaining victories, so he forced Honma to pass through a trial series to prove that he belongs in GBH. After ending his trial series with a losing record, Honma was initially kicked out of GBH but was allowed to remain in the group, after Togi Makabe took over the group's leadership. In April 2009, Honma showed his loyalty to Makabe by remaining in GBH after the other members of the group left to form the Chaos faction with Shinsuke Nakamura.

On December 23, 2011, Honma received a rare championship opportunity, when he challenged for the IWGP Intercontinental Championship in the main event of a NJPW show at Korakuen Hall, losing to champion Masato Tanaka at the end of a 23-minute bout. On March 28, 2012, New Japan announced that the promotion had released Honma from his contract due to a "personal problem". Following his release from NJPW, Honma returned to AJPW on September 8, 2012, where he remained for the rest of the year and much of early 2013. In March 2013, Honma began appearing in Pro Wrestling Noah, where he took part in the 2013 Global Tag League with Akitoshi Saito. The duo finished the tournament with one win and two points.

==== Return and injury (2013–2017) ====
On March 23, 2013, Honma returned to NJPW, saving Togi Makabe from Chaos. It was later revealed that Honma would be working for NJPW full-time as a freelancer. The reunited GBH had their first match back together on April 7 at Invasion Attack, where they were defeated by Masato Tanaka and Yujiro Takahashi in a tag team match. On May 3 at Wrestling Dontaku 2013, Honma unsuccessfully challenged Tanaka for the NEVER Openweight Championship. Honma received another shot at the title a year later at Wrestling Dontaku 2014, but was again defeated by the defending champion, Tomohiro Ishii. From July 21 to August 8, 2014, Honma took part in his first G1 Climax as a late replacement for an injured Kota Ibushi, losing all ten of his matches and finishing last in his block. Honma's struggle in the tournament made him one of the most popular wrestlers in all of NJPW, creating a movement called "Honmania". In November, Honma took part in the 2014 World Tag League, alongside Togi Makabe. The two finished last in their block with a record of three wins and four losses. The series of losses built to a big win on January 4, 2015, at Wrestle Kingdom 9 in Tokyo Dome, where Honma, Hiroyoshi Tenzan and Satoshi Kojima defeated Bullet Club's Bad Luck Fale, Jeff Jarrett and Yujiro Takahashi, with Honma pinning Takahashi for the win. On February 14 at The New Beginning in Sendai, Honma replaced an ill Togi Makabe in a match for the now vacant NEVER Openweight Championship, but was defeated by Tomohiro Ishii. During July and August, Honma took part in the 2015 G1 Climax. After losing his first seven matches in the tournament, Honma finally picked up his first ever win in the tournament over Tomohiro Ishii on August 12. After losing his final match against Yujiro Takahashi, Honma again finished last in his block with a record of one win and eight losses. Honma's win over Ishii led to him unsuccessfully challenging Ishii for the NEVER Openweight Championship on November 7 at Power Struggle. In December, Honma and Makabe won their block in the 2015 World Tag League with a record of four wins and two losses, advancing to the finals of the tournament.

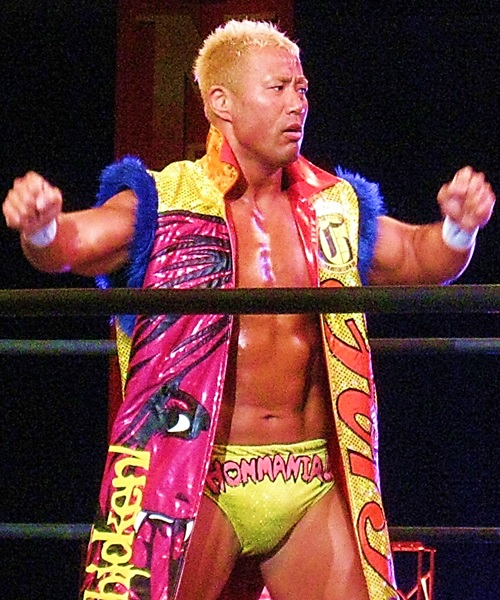
Honma in March 2015

On December 9, Honma and Makabe defeated Los Ingobernables de Japón (Evil and Tetsuya Naito) in the finals to win the 2015 World Tag League. On January 4, 2016, at Wrestle Kingdom 10 in Tokyo Dome, Honma won his first title in NJPW, when he and Makabe defeated Bullet Club's Doc Gallows and Karl Anderson for the IWGP Tag Team Championship. They made their first successful title defense on February 14 at The New Beginning in Niigata in a rematch against Gallows and Anderson. The following week, Honma took part in the NJPW and Ring of Honor (ROH) co-produced Honor Rising: Japan 2016 event, unsuccessfully challenging Jay Lethal for the ROH World Championship in the main event of the second show on February 20. Honma and Makabe lost the IWGP Tag Team Championship to Guerrillas of Destiny (Tama Tonga and Tanga Loa) on April 10 at Invasion Attack 2016. On July 3, Honma unsuccessfully challenged Katsuyori Shibata for the NEVER Openweight Championship. From July 22 to August 13, Honma took part in the 2016 G1 Climax, where he finished with a record of three wins and six losses. In November, Honma participated on the Revolution Pro Wrestling (RPW) and NJPW co-produced Global Wars UK event, where he defeated Sha Samuels on the first night, but lost to Josh Bodom on the second night. In December, Honma and Makabe advanced to the finals of the 2016 World Tag League by winning their block with a record of five wins and two losses. On December 10, Honma and Makabe defeated the reigning IWGP Tag Team Champions Guerrillas of Destiny to win the 2016 World Tag League, becoming the first ever team to win the tournament in two consecutive years. On January 4, 2017, at Wrestle Kingdom 11 in Tokyo Dome, Honma and Makabe took part in a three-way match for the IWGP Tag Team Championship, which was won by Tomohiro Ishii and Toru Yano.

On March 3, Honma was injured during a match, while taking a rope-hung DDT from Jado. Following the move, Honma could not get up and the match was immediately stopped, before he was taken backstage on a stretcher. Reportedly, Honma was able to speak and move his head, but not his arms or legs. The following day, NJPW announced that Honma had injured his cervical vertebrae. On March 6, it was announced that Honma had regained movement in his lower extremities and could grasp objects with his hands. Honma vowed to recover from the injury and return to the ring. On March 31, Honma announced he had successfully undergone surgery on his spinal canal. The following month, Honma stated he was looking to return to the ring in the fall of 2017. He was discharged in June after spending three and a half months in the hospital.

==== Return from injury (2018–present) ====
On June 3, 2018, it was announced that Honma would make his return to the ring later that month. Honma returned on June 23, teaming with Hiroshi Tanahashi, Togi Makabe, Ryusuke Taguchi, and Toa Henare to defeat Los Ingobernables de Japón (Tetsuya Naito, Evil, Hiromu Takahashi, Sanada, and Bushi).

On March 19, 2019, he appeared in the first match of the New Japan Cup in a team consisting of Yota Tsuji, Ren Narita, and Shota Umino.

On October 28, 2020, Honma scored his first victory since returning from injury in 2018 when he pinned Gedo in a six-man tag team match after a Kokeshi. He was teaming alongside Kota Ibushi and Hiroshi Tanahashi while also taking on Bullet Club (Jay White and Kenta).

On July 4, 2026, Honma announced that he would retire as a professional wrestler and his retirement match would be hold in Yamagata in 2027.

== Personal life ==
Honma's characteristically hoarse voice is the result of crushed vocal chords, a problem also suffered by fellow wrestlers Shachihoko Boy, Kohei Sato and Genichiro Tenryu. This actually was a result of a stiff lariat delivered by wrestler Rikiya Fudo during a tag team match between Honma and Kazushi Miyamoto against Fudo and Hirotaka Yokoi on May 28, 2006. According to Miyamoto, Honma would constantly vomit blood after the match in the locker room.

In November 2015, Honma's former girlfriend of 18 years, fellow professional wrestler Kiyoko Ichiki, accused him of domestic violence over the past four years. Honma denied the accusation, instead claiming that he was abused by her and stating that he was seeking legal action against her for trying to damage his career.

Since August 2017, Honma has been married to a woman named Chie.

== Championships and accomplishments ==
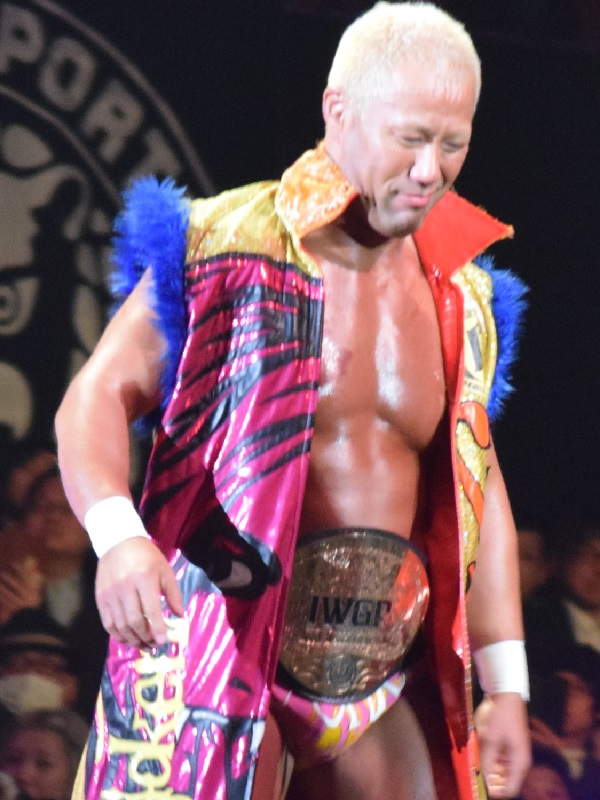
Honma as one half of the IWGP Tag Team Champions in February 2016

- Apache Pro-Wrestling Army
  - WEW World Tag Team Championship (1 time) – with Jun Kasai
- Big Japan Pro Wrestling
  - BJW Deathmatch Heavyweight Championship (2 times)
  - BJW Tag Team Championship (2 times) – with Shadow WX (1) and Ryuji Yamakawa (1)
  - Maximum Tag League (1999, 2000) - with Ryuji Yamakawa
- New Japan Pro-Wrestling
  - IWGP Tag Team Championship (1 time) – with Togi Makabe
  - World Tag League (2015, 2016) – with Togi Makabe
- Pro Wrestling Illustrated
  - Ranked No. 226 of the top 500 singles wrestlers in the PWI 500 in 2018
- Tokyo Sports
  - Technique Award (2015)
