= Bad Luck Fale =

Tongan-New Zealand wrestler and rugby player

Don Fale
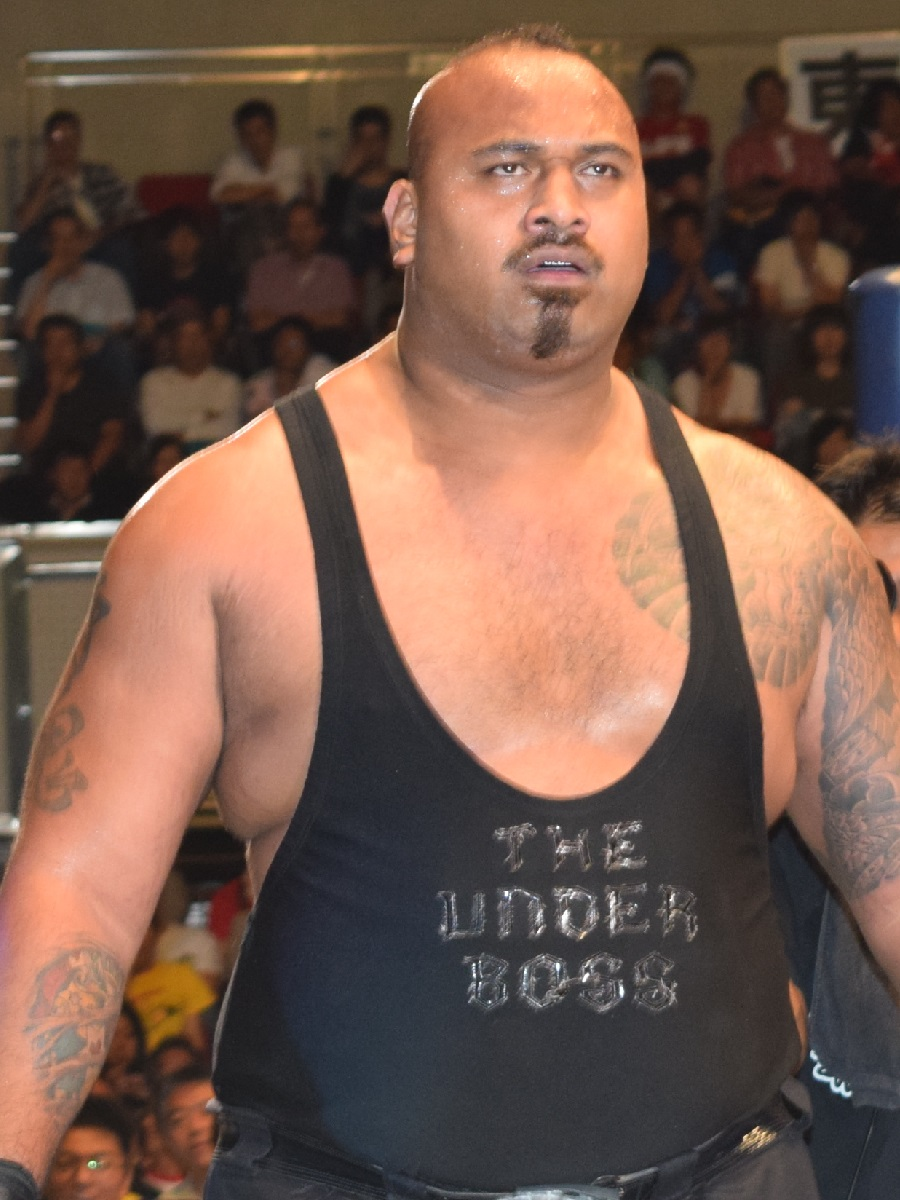
- Fale in 2015

Personal information
- Born: Simi Taitoko Fale; 8 January 1982 (age 44) Tonga
- Education: Tokuyama University
- Family: Tama Tonga (cousin); Tanga Loa (cousin); Hikuleo (cousin)

Professional wrestling career
- Ring name(s): Don Fale; Bad Luck Fale; King Fale
- Billed height: 1.93 m (6 ft 4 in)
- Billed weight: 156 kg (344 lb)
- Billed from: Kingdom of Tonga
- Trained by: NJPW Dojo; Yuji Nagata; Yujiro Takahashi; Jado
- Debut: 4 April 2010

Simi Taitoko Fale (born 8 January 1982) is a Tongan professional wrestler and former rugby union player. He is signed to New Japan Pro-Wrestling (NJPW), where performs under the ring name as Don Fale (ドン・ファレ, Don Fare) and is a member of House of Torture. Best known by his longtime ring name Bad Luck Fale (バッドラック・ファレ, Baddorakku Fare), he is a former three-time NEVER Openweight 6-Man Tag Team Champion, a one-time IWGP Tag Team Champion and a one-time IWGP Intercontinental Champion. His surname translates to "house" in Tongan, which suits his wrestling persona as an immovable force.

Fale is one of the founding members of Bullet Club, an originally all-foreigner stable that saw great success in the company. Fale remained the only founding member to have never left the group until 15 June 2025, when he joined House of Torture.

Fale also operates a wrestling school called Fale Dojo, which has helped provide a bridge for non-Japanese wrestlers to perform for New Japan Pro-Wrestling.

== Early life ==
Fale was a rugby union player prior to training and debuting for New Japan Pro-Wrestling. He attended the strong rugby school of De La Salle College, Mangere East in Auckland, New Zealand and was a member of the 1st XV from 1999 to 2000, also making age grade rugby teams along the way. He then accepted scholarship to play rugby in Japan at Tokuyama University, alongside fellow New Zealander Sila Iona and Greame Brent, where they attended from 2001 to 2005. From April 2006 to March 2008, he played for the Japanese rugby union team Fukuoka Sanix Blues. He would start training to become a professional wrestler in June 2009.

== Professional wrestling career ==
=== New Japan Pro-Wrestling ===
==== Early years (2010–2012) ====
Fale, working under the ring name "King Fale", made his in-ring debut on 4 April 2010, when he was defeated by Manabu Nakanishi. Fale's earned his first win in New Japan just over a month after his debut, defeating Kyosuke Mikami. Fale and Super Strong Machine entered the 2010 G1 Tag League, finishing last in their block and overall with zero wins and zero points. Fale also took part in the 2010 J Sports Crown Openweight 6 Man Tag Tournament alongside Giant Bernard and Karl Anderson, making it to the second round before being eliminated. Fale later faced fellow young lion Hiromu Takahashi in a three match series, winning all of them.

In February 2011, Fale joined Yuji Nagata's Seigigun ("Blue Justice Army") stable along with Wataru Inoue and Super Strong Machine. At The New Beginning on 20 February, Nagata, Inoue, Fale and Hiroyoshi Tenzan faced Chaos (Shinsuke Nakamura, Toru Yano, Takashi Iizuka, and Yujiro Takahashi) in losing effort. In the prelude to the 2011 J Sports Openweight 6 Man Tag Tournament, Fale again teamed with Inoue and Tenzan, losing to Bad Intentions (Giant Bernard & Karl Anderson) & Jyushin Thunder Liger. In the actual tournament, they were eliminated in the second round by Great Bash Heel (Togi Makabe & Tomoaki Honma) & Satoshi Kojima. In April 2011, Fale took part in All Together, a joint show between New Japan Pro-Wrestling, All Japan Pro Wrestling and Pro Wrestling Noah in the wake of the 2011 Tōhoku earthquake and tsunami, unsuccessfully competing in The Destroyer Cup battle royal. Fale teamed with Nagata in the 2011 G1 Tag League, finishing with one win and two points. Bad Luck Fale lost his first match of 2012, when he teamed with Tama Tonga to take on Okumura and Yoshi-Hashi. At NJPW's 40th Anniversary Show, Fale teamed with Tomoaki Honma to take on Chaos (Yoshi-Hashi and Yujiro Takahashi) in a losing effort. On 10 February 2012 at NEVER.8: Go to the Next Level, Fale unsuccessfully faced Yuji Nagata in singles action. Afterward, he left for a fourteen-month learning excursion to the United States. On 8 June 2012, Fale debuted for NWA Houston, losing to Mysterious Q.

==== Bullet Club (2013–2025) ====
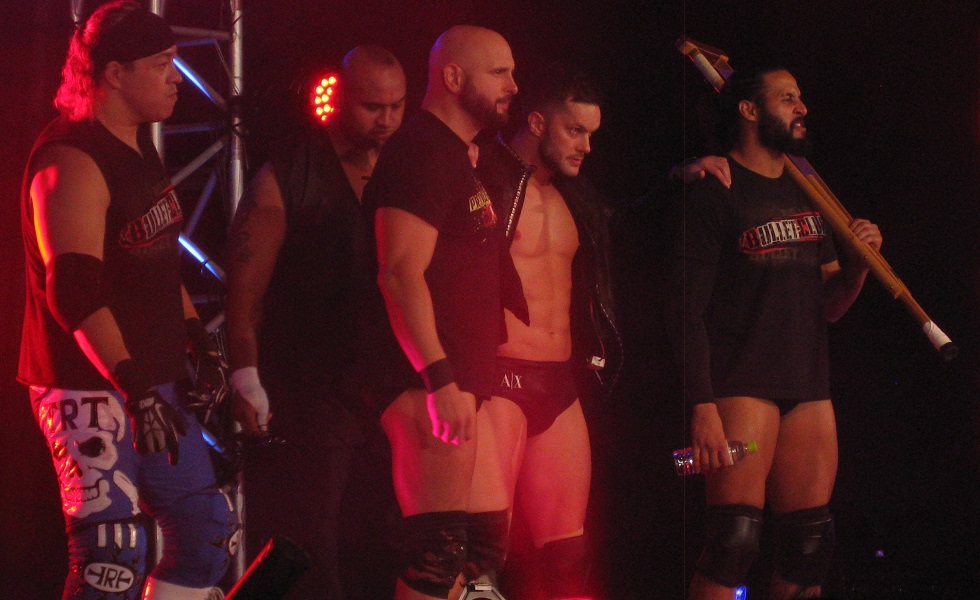
Fale (back) with Bullet Club in September 2013

On 7 April 2013, at Invasion Attack, Fale, now performing as a heel, returned to New Japan as Prince Devitt's "bouncer" under the new ring name of "The Underboss" Bad Luck Fale. Fale wrestled his return match on 3 May at Wrestling Dontaku, teaming with Devitt to defeat Captain New Japan and Ryusuke Taguchi. Later that night, Fale and Devitt joined forces with Karl Anderson and Tama Tonga, forming a stable and dubbing themselves "Bullet Club". Later in the year, Fale began his first major feud in New Japan with IWGP Heavyweight Champion Togi Makabe, who had been eliminated from the 2013 G1 Climax following interference from Fale during a match with Devitt. From 23 November to 7 December, Fale and Devitt took part in the 2013 World Tag League, where they finished with a record of three wins and three losses, with a loss against the previously winless Captain New Japan and Hiroshi Tanahashi on the final day costing them a spot in the semifinals. The rivalry between Fale and Makabe culminated in a King of Destroyer match on 4 January 2014, at Wrestle Kingdom 8 in Tokyo Dome, where Makabe was victorious. Fale and Makabe again faced off on 15 March in the first round of the 2014 New Japan Cup, where Fale was victorious. Fale made it to the final of the tournament before losing to Shinsuke Nakamura on 23 March.

On 21 June at Dominion 6.21, Fale defeated Nakamura in a rematch to become the new IWGP Intercontinental Champion. From 21 July to 8 August, Fale took part in his first G1 Climax, where he finished third in his block with a record of six wins and four losses with a loss against Nakamura on the final day preventing him from making it to the final. On 21 September at Destruction in Kobe, Fale lost the IWGP Intercontinental Championship back to Nakamura in his first defense. In November, Fale entered the 2014 World Tag League, alongside stablemate Tama Tonga. The team finished at the bottom of their block with a record of three wins and four losses. In early 2015, Fale started feuding with Kazuchika Okada, which led to him picking up a major win on 5 March, defeating the two-time IWGP Heavyweight Champion in the first round of the 2015 New Japan Cup. Fale was eliminated from the tournament in the second round by Tetsuya Naito. The rivalry between Fale and Okada culminated on 5 April at Invasion Attack 2015, where Fale was defeated by Okada. From 20 July to 14 August, Fale took part in the 2015 G1 Climax. Despite scoring a major win over eventual tournament winner Hiroshi Tanahashi, Fale finished fourth in his block with a record of five wins and four losses and thus failed to advance to the finals. Due to his win over Tanahashi, Fale was granted a shot at the Wrestle Kingdom 10 IWGP Heavyweight Championship match contract, but was defeated by Tanahashi on 27 September at Destruction in Kobe.

On 4 January 2016, at Wrestle Kingdom 10, Fale took part in a match to crown the inaugural NEVER Openweight 6-Man Tag Team Champions, where he, Tama Tonga and Yujiro Takahashi were defeated by Jay Briscoe, Mark Briscoe and Toru Yano. Despite the mass exodus of Bullet Club members from New Japan (Leader AJ Styles, Karl Anderson and Doc Gallows all left), Fale re-signed with New Japan for 2 years instead of the usual 1 amidst WWE interest. On 11 February at The New Beginning in Osaka, Fale, Tonga and Takahashi defeated the Briscoes and Yano in a rematch to win the NEVER Openweight 6-Man Tag Team Championship. After a three-day reign, they lost the title back to the Briscoes and Yano at The New Beginning in Niigata. On 3 March, Fale scored a big win over Hiroshi Tanahashi in the first round of the 2016 New Japan Cup. The following day, he was eliminated from the tournament in the second round by Michael Elgin. Fale then started a new feud with Hiroshi Tanahashi, as part of which he, Kenny Omega and Yujiro Takahashi unsuccessfully challenged Tanahashi, Michael Elgin and Yoshitatsu for the NEVER Openweight 6-Man Tag Team Championship on 23 April. From 18 July to 12 August, Fale took part in the 2016 G1 Climax, where, despite scoring big wins over Naomichi Marufuji and reigning IWGP Heavyweight Champion Kazuchika Okada, he failed to advance from his block with a record of five wins and four losses.

In February 2017, Fale opened his own wrestling school, the Fale Dojo, in Auckland, New Zealand. The following month, Fale made it to the finals of the 2017 New Japan Cup, before losing to Katsuyori Shibata. On 9 April at Sakura Genesis 2017, Fale attacked IWGP Heavyweight Champion Kazuchika Okada and challenged him to a title match. The title match took place on 3 May at Wrestling Dontaku 2017 and saw Okada retain. During the summer, Fale took part in the 2017 G1 Climax, where he finished third in his block with a record of six wins and three losses, failing to advance to the finals. On 11 August, Fale defeated Yuji Nagata in his former mentor's final G1 Climax match and afterwards bowed to him in a show of respect. On 17 December, Fale, Tama Tonga and Tanga Loa defeated Los Ingobernables de Japón (Bushi, Evil and Sanada) to become the new NEVER Openweight 6-Man Tag Team Champions. They lost the title to Chaos (Beretta, Tomohiro Ishii and Toru Yano) in a five-team gauntlet match on 4 January 2018, at Wrestle Kingdom 12 in Tokyo Dome. The following day at New Year's Dash, they would regain the title from Chaos. Fale then competed in the 2018 New Japan Cup, where he was eliminated by Hiroshi Tanahashi in the second round. On night 1 of Wrestling Dontaku 2018 on 3 May, the Bullet Club lost the 6-Man tag titles to the Super Villains (Marty Scurll and The Young Bucks). Fale next wrestled in the 2018 G1 Climax, competing in the A block. He ended with 6 points, failing to advance to the finals. During this time, the Bullet Club split into two divisions, the OG and the Elite; Fale, Tama Tonga, Tanga Loa and Taiji Ishimori remained in the OG group. At King of Pro-Wrestling on 8 October, the Bullet Club OG defeated the Bullet Club Elite (the Young Bucks, Chase Owens and Hangman Page).

On 28 January, Fale debuted a new gimmick called "The Rogue General", and started a short feud with Kazuchika Okada. At The New Beginning in Osaka in February 2019, Fale lost to Okada. Fale competed in the 2019 New Japan Cup, but was eliminated by Will Ospreay in the first round. At the G1 Supercard on 6 April, Fale unsuccessfully competed in the Honor Rumble. Fale would embark on a feud (alongside Chase Owens) against the newly arrived Mikey Nicholls and fan favorite Juice Robinson. The feud would include Fale unsuccessfully challenging for Juice's IWGP United States Championship before beating Mikey with his usually ineffective signature move, the Grenade. Fale would then compete in the 2019 G1 Climax in the A block, ending with 8 points, therefore failing to advance to the finals. Later that year he would team with Chase Owens in the World Tag League. They finished the tournament with 6 wins and 9 losses, failing to advance to the finals. At Wrestle Kingdom 14, Fale wrestled on both nights. The first night, he teamed with Bullet Club (Kenta, Chase Owens & Yujiro Takahashi) in a loss to Chaos (Hirooki Goto, Tomohiro Ishii, Toru Yano & Yoshi-Hashi). He then participated in a 5-team gauntlet for the NEVER Openweight 6-Man Tag Team Championship on night two's pre-show, in which he, Chase Owens & Yujiro Takahashi were eliminated by Chaos's Tomohiro Ishii, Yoshi-Hashi & Robbie Eagles.

Fale was absent most of the year as he was unable to return to Japan due to border closures as a result of the COVID-19 pandemic. He returned in November, competing in the 2020 World Tag League with Chase Owens, however, the pair ended the tournament with 3 wins and 6 losses, failing to advance to the final. On 22 December, it was announced that Toru Yano would face Fale for the Official KOPW 2020 Trophy in a Bodyslam or No Corner Pads match after Yano's stipulation won the majority of the fan vote. The following day, Fale was defeated by Yano after he was bodyslammed. On night 1 of Wrestle Kingdom 15, Fale advanced from the New Japan Ranbo match to compete in a four way match for the Provisional KOPW 2021 Trophy. On night 2, Fale failed to win the four way match that also included Toru Yano, Chase Owens, and Bushi.

In March 2021, Fale entered in the 2021 New Japan Cup, but was eliminated in the first round after he was counted out in a match against Toru Yano. From 14 November to 12 December, Fale and Chase Owens again competed in the World Tag League, failing to advance to the final after finishing the tournament with 6 wins and 4 losses. On night 1 of Wrestle Kingdom 16, Fale failed to advance from the New Japan Ranbo match. Fale received a bye to the second round of the 2022 New Japan Cup, but was eliminated by Hiroshi Tanahashi. At Wrestling Dontaku 2022, Fale and Chase Owens won the IWGP Tag Team Championship in a three-way tag team match. They lost the titles on 12 June, at Dominion 6.12 in Osaka-jo Hall. Also at the event, Fale was announced to be a part of the G1 Climax 32 tournament in July, where he would compete in the A Block. He finished with 6 points, failing to advance to the semi-finals.

On 14 October 2024 at King of Pro-Wrestling event Fale and his newest Bullet Club Rogue Army member, Caveman Ugg unsuccessfully challenged the IWGP Tag Team Champions, Mikey Nicholls and Shane Haste.

==== House of Torture (2025–present) ====
At Dominion 6.15 in Osaka-jo Hall on 15 June 2025, Fale, now going by Don Fale, was revealed as the newest member of House of Torture. In March 2026, Fale participated the New Japan Cup, defeating Aaron Wolf in the first round, but lost to Shingo Takagi in the second.

On October 10 episode of Tamahashi Fale defeated Johnny recon and Trent Hopper to win the NJPW Tamahashi Openweight Championship

== Professional wrestling persona and style ==
When Fale first turned his back on Yuji Nagata and most of New Japan's fan favorites, he became known as The Underboss of Prince Devitt and Bullet Club, carrying Devitt to the ring. After a few years, Fale decided to embrace not being a low-key member of Bullet Club, renaming his persona The Rogue General. Fale, being a larger wrestler has always utilized power-based moves in his arsenal. Being a villainous character, he uses his power to inflict more pain than necessary and to control the opponent's pace. He is also known to attack ring announcers before his match. Despite having the power (and at some times in his career, the athletic) advantage over most of his opponents, Fale's character has always tried to take the easy way out and cheat during matches.

Fale's big moves include a jumping splash, the Grenade, a Thumb Lariat (succeeded after choke-lifting the opponent with his other hand), Bad Luck Fall, a release Crucifix Powerbomb and different variations of a Schoolboy sweep.

== Personal life ==
Fale is the cousin of Tanga Loa, Tama Tonga and Hikuleo. Fale and Tama had spent their early childhoods in Muʻa, Tonga without meeting. They were in the NJPW Dojo at the same time and realized they were related when a relative commented on a photo Fale had posted on social media. He is of Tongan ethnicity and is fluent in Tongan, English and Japanese.

In 2017 it was reported that Fale was in a relationship with go-go dancer Pieter, also known as the "Tokyo Latina", who has made appearances for NJPW as a valet for Fale's Bullet Club stablemate Yujiro Takahashi.

Fale also runs his own professional wrestling school, Fale Dojo. in Auckland, New Zealand that has seen a few of its alumni in NJPW: Toa Henare, Jay White and Michael Richards.

== Championships and accomplishments ==
- New Japan Pro-Wrestling
  - IWGP Intercontinental Championship (1 time)
  - IWGP Tag Team Championship (1 time) – with Chase Owens
  - NEVER Openweight 6-Man Tag Team Championship (3 times) – with Tama Tonga and Yujiro Takahashi (1), and Tama Tonga and Tanga Loa (2)
  - NJPW TAMASHII Openweight Championship (1 time, inaugural, current)
  - New Japan Ranbo (2021)
- Pro Wrestling Illustrated
  - Ranked No. 71 of the top 500 singles wrestlers in the PWI 500 in 2017
