= The New Beginning in Nagoya (2023) =

2023 professional wrestling event

- Promotional poster featuring Shingo Takagi and Great-O-Khan
- Promotion: New Japan Pro-Wrestling
- Date: January 22, 2023
- City: Nagoya, Japan
- Venue: Aichi Prefectural Gymnasium (Dolphins Arena)
- Attendance: 1,650

Event chronology
← Previous; New Year Dash!!	Next → Road to The New Beginning

The New Beginning chronology
← Previous; USA (2022)	Next → Sapporo (2023)

The New Beginning in Nagoya was a professional wrestling event promoted by New Japan Pro-Wrestling (NJPW). The event took place on January 22, 2023 in Nagoya, Aichi at the Aichi Prefectural Gymnasium (Dolphins Arena). It was the thirty-fourth event promoted under the NJPW The New Beginning name and the second to be held in Nagoya, after 2021.

== Production ==
=== Background ===
NJPW held the inaugural The New Beginning event on February 15, 2011, with future events going on to take place annually in January and/or February. In 2022, New Beginning events were absent, aside from The New Beginning USA. On January 9, 2023, NJPW announced the return of New Beginning, revealing that The New Beginning In Nagoya would take place on January 22 at the Aichi Prefectural Gymnasium in Nagoya, Japan.

=== Storylines ===
The New Beginning in Osaka featured seven professional wrestling matches that involve different wrestlers from pre-existing scripted feuds and storylines. Wrestlers portray villains, heroes, or less distinguishable characters in scripted events that build tension and culminate in a wrestling match or series of matches.

At New Year Dash on January 5, 2023, Shingo Takagi become the first Provisional KOPW of 2023 after beating Toru Yano, Sho and Great-O-Khan in a Four Way match. After the bout, O-Khan would stare down Takagi, holding his RevPro Undisputed British Heavyweight Championship. Backstage, O-Khan would challenge Takagi to a match. On January 10, NJPW announced that Takagi would defend his Provisional KOPW Championship against O-Khan at The New Beginning In Nagoya. On January 12, both men chooses their stipulations with Takagi choosing a 30 count pinfall match and O-Khan choosing a mixed martial arts rules match with O-Khan's chosen stipulation winning the fan poll.

== Event ==
Other on-screen personnel
Role:	Name:
English Commentators	Kevin Kelly
English Commentators	Chris Charlton
English Commentators	Gino Gambino
Japanese Commentators	Shinpei Nogami
Japanese Commentators	Milano Collection A.T.
Japanese Commentators	Katsuhiko Kanazawa
Japanese Commentators	Kazuyoshi Sakai
Ring announcers	Hidekazu Tanaka
Ring announcers	Kimihiko Ozaki
Ring announcers	Makoto Abe
Referees	Norio Honaga
Referees	Kenta Sato
Referees	Yuya Sakamoto
Referees	Marty Asami
Referees	Red Shoes Unno

The event started with a match between Togi Makabe and Toru Yano and Yuto Nakashima and Oskar Leube. In the end, Makabe clotheslined Nakashima and hit the King Kong Knee Drop for the victory.

Next, House of Torture faced Minoru Suzuki, El Desperado, Ren Narita and Tomoaki Honma. In the end, Narita hit a northern lights suplex and connected with the Cobra Twist on Dick Togo, forcing Togo to submit.

The next match saw Chaos and Ryohei Oiwa take on TMDK. In the closing stages, Shane Haste delivered a dropkick and the Sitour powerbomb on Oiwa to pickup the victory.

The fourth match featured Bullet Club taking on Hiroshi Tanahashi, Master Wato and Jado. Bullet Club won after El Phantasmo connected with The Sudden Death on Jado.

Next, United Empire squared off against Just4Guys (with Taka Michinoku). In the end, Francesco Akira delivered a DDT and Will Ospreay hit The Hidden Blade to Douki to pickup the win.

The penultimate match saw Ryusuke Taguchi, Shota Umino, Kazuchika Okada and Yoh team up to take on Los Ingobernables de Japon. In the end, Umino delivered a pop up uppercut, the Reverse Bloody Sunday and The Death Rider, on Bushi to win the match.

=== Main event ===
The main event was Shingo Takagi defending the Provisional KOPW 2023 Championship in a Mixed Martial Arts match against Great-O-Khan. O-Khan applied a leglock on Takagi, but Takagi reached the ropes. Takaji then delivered a sliding lariat and a sleeper but O-Khan reached the ropes. O-Khan then performed a head and arm choke and a judo throw. Ospreay, unbeknownst to the referee, hit an OsCutter. O-Khan then applied a sleeper hold. Takagi escaped and hit The Last of the Dragon, and forced O-Khan to pass out with the Tazmission. After the match, Takagi called out Kazuchika Okada, telling him that he would be a double champion. Takagi then celebrated with Los Ingobernables de Japon as the show closed out.

== Results ==
No.	Results	Stipulations	Times
1	Togi Makabe and Toru Yano defeated Oskar Leube and Yuto Nakashima by pinfall	Tag team match	9:25
2	El Desperado, Minoru Suzuki, Ren Narita and Tomoaki Honma defeated House Of Torture (Dick Togo, Evil, Sho and Yujiro Takahashi) by pinfall	Eight-man tag team match	10:40
3	The Mighty Don't Kneel (Kosei Fujita, Mikey Nicholls, Shane Haste and Zack Sabre Jr.) defeated Ryohei Oiwa and Chaos (Bishamon (Hirooki Goto and Yoshi-Hashi) and Tomohiro Ishii) by pinfall	Eight-man tag team match	11:12
4	Bullet Club (Bullet's Club Cutest Tag Team (El Phantasmo and Taiji Ishimori) and Kenta) defeated Hiroshi Tanahashi, Jado and Master Wato by pinfall	Six-man tag team match	11:27
5	United Empire (Aaron Henare, Francesco Akira, TJP and Will Ospreay) defeated Just 4 Guys (Douki, Taichi, Taka Michinoku and Yoshinobu Kanemaru) by pinfall	Eight-man tag team match	9:24
6	Ryusuke Taguchi, Shota Umino and Chaos (Kazuchika Okada and Yoh) defeated Los Ingobernables de Japón (Bushi, Hiromu Takahashi, Sanada and Tetsuya Naito) by pinfall	Eight-man tag team match	11:20
7	Shingo Takagi (c) defeated Great-O-Khan by technical submission	Mixed Martial Arts rules match for the Provisional KOPW 2023 Championship; Takagi's IWGP World Heavyweight Championship match at The New Beginning in Osaka was also on the line.	22:37
(c) / – the champion(s) heading into the match
