= The New Beginning in Sapporo (2023) =

2023 professional wrestling event

- Promotion: New Japan Pro-Wrestling
- Date: February 4–5, 2023
- City: Sapporo, Japan
- Venue: Hokkaido Prefectural Sports Center
- Attendance: Night 1: 3,073; Night 2: 3,316

Event chronology
← Previous; Road to The New Beginning	Next → Road to The New Beginning

The New Beginning chronology
← Previous; Nagoya (2023)	Next → Osaka (2023)

The New Beginning in Sapporo was a professional wrestling event promoted by New Japan Pro-Wrestling (NJPW). The event took place on February 4 and 5, 2023 in Sapporo, Hokkaido at the Hokkaido Prefectural Sports Center. The first night of the event featured eight matches, one of which was contested for a championship, while the second night featured three championship matches out of also eight matches overall.

This was the thirty-fifth event under the New Beginning name and the fifth to take place in Sapporo, with the last back in 2020.

== Production ==
=== Background ===
NJPW held the inaugural The New Beginning event on February 15, 2011, with future events going on to take place annually in January and/or February. In 2022, New Beginning events were absent, aside from The New Beginning USA.

=== Storylines ===
The New Beginning in Osaka featured professional wrestling matches that involved different wrestlers from pre-existing scripted feuds and storylines. Wrestlers portrayed villains, heroes, or less distinguishable characters in scripted events that built tension and culminated in a wrestling match or series of matches.

== Event ==
Other on-screen personnel
Role:	Name:
English Commentators	Kevin Kelly
English Commentators	Chris Charlton
English Commentators	Gino Gambino
Japanese Commentators	Shinpei Nogami
Japanese Commentators	Milano Collection A.T.
Japanese Commentators	Katsuhiko Kanazawa
Japanese Commentators	Kazuyoshi Sakai
Ring announcers	Hidekazu Tanaka
Ring announcers	Kimihiko Ozaki
Ring announcers	Makoto Abe
Referees	Kenta Sato
Referees	Yuya Sakamoto
Referees	Marty Asami

=== Night 1 ===
Night 1 started with a match between Great-O-Khan taking on Oskar Leube. O-Khan won after applying the Sheep Killer.

Next, House of Torture faces Ren Narita, Ryohei Oiwa, El Desperado and Minoru Suzuki. In the end, Narita connected with a Kanuki suplex and applied the Cobra Twist for the submission win.

Next, TMDK took on Chaos and Yuto Nakashima. TMDK won after Kosei Fujita applied a double wristlock on Nakashima for the submission win.

Next, The Guerrillas of Destiny, Master Wato and Hiroshi Tanahashi faced Bullet Club. In the end, Wato performed a Mistica into a jackknife pin for the win.

Next on the card, Los Ingobernables de Japon faced Chaos and Ryusuke Taguchi. LIJ won after Shingo Takagi hit The Last of the Dragonon Taguchi.

Next, Catch 2/2 (with Great-O-Khan) defended the IWGP Junior Heavyweight Tag Team Championship against Just4Guys (with Taka Michinoku). Catch 2/2 won after TJP performed a plancha on the outside to Yoshinobu Kanemaru and Francesco Akira delivered a Speedball and Nova Fireball for the win.

In the penultimate match, Will Ospreay (with Great-O-Khan) took on Taichi. In the closing stages, Ospreay performed a rolling elbow, the Hidden Blade and the StormBreaker for the win.

=== First main event ===
In the main event, Tetsuya Naito faced Shota Umino. Umino performed a tornado DDT and a missile dropkick. Naito then took Umino to the corner for the Combinacion Cabron. Naito then hit a swinging DDT and the Pluma Blanca. As Naito was looking for Destino, Umino countered into a piledriver. Umino then delivered another piledriver, but Naito kicked out. Naito then hit a reverse DDT for a two-count. As Naito was looking for Destino again, Umino again countered into a package tombstone slam. Umino was then looking for another Death Rider, but Naito escaped and delivered two Destinos for the win.

=== Night 2 ===
Night 2 started with United Empire facing Just4Guys. In the end, Ospreay hit the Hidden Blade on Michinoku for the win.

Next, Yuto Nakashima, Minoru Suzuki, El Desperado and Ren Narita faced House of Torture. The former won after Narita connected with the Cobra Twist on Yujiro Takahashi for the submission victory. After the match, Suzuki, Desperado and Narita challenged House of Torture to a championship match at Osaka.

Next, Kenta and Taiji Ishimori faced Master Wato and Hiroshi Tanahashi. In the end, after Cipher UTAKI was blocked, Ishimori rolled up Wato for the win.

Next, Guerrillas of Destiny took on Bullet Club. As Gedo was trying to use brass knuckles, Tama Tonga intercepted into a Gun Stun, before Jado delivered a crossface for the submission victory.

Next, Los Ingobernables de Japon faced Shota Umino, Ryusuke Taguchi, Kazuchika Okada and Toru Yano. In the end, as Sanada was looking for a moonsault, Okada escaped and delivered a two Rainmakers for the win.

The next bout saw Bishamon defend the IWGP World Tag Team Championship against TMDK. In the end, Mikey Nicholls delivered a Blue Thunder Bomb to Hirooki Goto, but Yoshi-Hashi broke it up. Bishamon then delivered an elevated GTR for the win.

In the penultimate match, Zack Sabre Jr. faced Tomohiro Ishii for the NJPW World Television Championship. In the latter stages, Ishii delivered a headbutt and a sliding lariat, but Sabre Jr. kicked out. Sabre Jr. then hit the Zack Driver to retain his title.

=== Second main event ===
Hiromu Takahashi defended the IWGP Junior Heavyweight Championship against Yoh in the main event. As Takahashi was looking for the Time Bomb, Yoh blocked it and hit a lariat. As Yoh escaped another Time Bomb attempt, Takahashi delivered a Victory Royal DDT, a reverse hurricarana, a superkick, a dragon suplex and the Time Bomb for a two-count. As Takahashi was looking for another Time Bomb, Yoh escaped and delivered a reverse DDT. As Yoh was looking for Direct Driver, Takahashi delivered a Stunner, but You kicked out. Takahashi then delivered a 5 Star Clutch, but Yon refused to quit. Takahashi then delivered two Hiromu chan Bombers and another Time Bomb to pickup the win and retain the title.

== Results ==
Night 1
No.	Results	Stipulations	Times
1	Great-O-Khan defeated Oskar Leube by submission	Singles match	7:25
2	Ryohei Oiwa, Ren Narita, El Desperado and Minoru Suzuki defeated House of Torture (Dick Togo, Sho, Yujiro Takahashi and Evil by submission	Eight-man tag team match	9:36
3	The Mighty Don't Kneel (Kosei Fujita, Mikey Nicholls, Shane Haste and Zack Sabre Jr.) defeated Chaos (Bishamon (Yoshi-Hashi and Hirooki Goto) and Tomohiro Ishii) and Yuto Nakashima by submission	Eight-man tag team match	11:28
4	Guerrillas of Destiny (Hikuleo and Tama Tonga), Master Wato and Hiroshi Tanahashi defeated Bullet Club (Jay White, Bullet Club's Cutest Tag Team (Taiji Ishimori and El Phantasmo) and Kenta) (with Gedo) by pinfall	Eight-man tag team match	12:48
5	Los Ingobernables de Japon (Sanada, Bushi, Shingo Takagi and Hiromu Takahashi) defeated Chaos (Kazuchika Okada, Yoh and Toru Yano) and Ryusuke Taguchi by pinfall	Eight-man tag team match	11:02
6	Catch 2/2 (Francesco Akira and TJP) (c) (with Great-O-Khan) defeated Just Four Guys (Douki and Yoshinobu Kanemaru) (with Taka Michinoku) by pinfall	Tag team match for the IWGP Junior Heavyweight Tag Team Championship	18:24
7	Will Ospreay (with Great-O-Khan) defeated Taichi by pinfall	Singles match	22:47
8	Tetsuya Naito defeated Shota Umino by pinfall	Singles match	32:11
(c) / – the champion(s) heading into the match

Night 2
No.	Results	Stipulations	Times
1	United Empire (Francesco Akira, Will Ospreay, TJP and Great-O-Khan) defeated Just Four Guys (Taka Michinoku, Douki, Taichi and Yoshinobu Kanemaru) by pinfall	Eight-man tag team match	10:11
2	Yuto Nakashima, Ren Narita, El Desperado and Minoru Suzuki defeated House of Torture (Dick Togo, Sho, Yujiro Takahashi and Evil) by submission	Eight-man tag team match	10:19
3	Bullet Club (Taiji Ishimori and Kenta) defeated Master Wato and Hiroshi Tanahashi by pinfall	Tag team match	10:41
4	Guerillas of Destiny (Hikuleo, Tama Tonga and Jado) defeated Bullet Club (Jay White, Gedo and El Phantasmo) by pinfall	Six-man tag team match	12:58
5	Shota Umino, Ryusuke Taguchi and Chaos (Toru Yano and Kazuchika Okada) defeated Los Ingobernables de Japon (Bushi, Sanada, Tetsuya Naito and Shingo Takagi) by pinfall	Eight-man tag team match	11:03
6	Bishamon (Hirooki Goto and Yoshi-Hashi) (c) defeated The Mighty Don't Kneel (Mikey Nicholls and Shane Haste) by pinfall	Tag team match for the IWGP Tag Team Championship	15:13
7	Zack Sabre Jr. (c) defeated Tomohiro Ishii by pinfall	Singles match for the NJPW World Television Championship	14:38
8	Hiromu Takahashi (c) defeated Yoh by pinfall	Singles match for the IWGP Junior Heavyweight Championship	29:42
(c) / – the champion(s) heading into the match
