= NJPW The New Beginning =

New Japan Pro-Wrestling event series

The New Beginning
- NJPW The New Beginning logo
- Promotions: New Japan Pro-Wrestling
- First event: The New Beginning (2011)

The New Beginning is an annual professional wrestling event promoted by New Japan Pro-Wrestling (NJPW). The event has been held since 2011 as a pay-per-view (PPV). From 2013 to 2014, the event also aired outside Japan as an internet pay-per-view (iPPV). Since 2015, the event has aired worldwide on NJPW's internet streaming site, NJPW World. The event is held in February, the month following NJPW's biggest annual event, the January 4 Dome Show, usually the culmination point of major storylines. As the name of the event suggests, it marks the beginning of a new year for the promotion.

== Events ==
#	Event	Date	City	Venue	Attendance	Main event	Ref(s)
1	The New Beginning (2011)	February 15, 2011	Tokyo, Japan	Korakuen Hall	1,500	Hiroshi Tanahashi and Prince Devitt vs. Kojima-gun (Satoshi Kojima and Taka Michinoku)	
2	The New Beginning (2011)	February 20, 2011	Sendai, Japan	Sendai Sun Plaza Hall	3,200	Hiroshi Tanahashi (c) vs. Satoshi Kojima for the IWGP Heavyweight Championship	
3	The New Beginning (2012)	February 12, 2012	Osaka, Japan	Osaka Prefectural Gymnasium	6,200	Hiroshi Tanahashi (c) vs. Kazuchika Okada for the IWGP Heavyweight Championship	
4	The New Beginning (2013)	February 10, 2013	Hiroshima, Japan	Hiroshima Sun Plaza Hall	4,780	Hiroshi Tanahashi (c) vs. Karl Anderson for the IWGP Heavyweight Championship	
5	The New Beginning in Hiroshima (2014)	February 9, 2014	Hiroshima, Japan	Hiroshima Sun Plaza Hall	5,040	Hiroshi Tanahashi (c) vs. Shinsuke Nakamura for the IWGP Intercontinental Championship	
6	The New Beginning in Osaka (2014)	February 11, 2014	Osaka, Japan	Osaka Prefectural Gymnasium	6,400	Kazuchika Okada (c) vs. Hirooki Goto for the IWGP Heavyweight Championship	
7	The New Beginning in Osaka (2015)	February 11, 2015	Osaka, Japan	Osaka Prefectural Gymnasium	7,500	Hiroshi Tanahashi (c) vs. A.J. Styles for the IWGP Heavyweight Championship	
8	The New Beginning in Sendai	February 14, 2015	Sendai, Japan	Sendai Sun Plaza Hall	2,900	Shinsuke Nakamura (c) vs. Yuji Nagata for the IWGP Intercontinental Championship	
9	The New Beginning in Osaka (2016)	February 11, 2016	Osaka, Japan	Osaka Prefectural Gymnasium	5,180	Kazuchika Okada (c) vs. Hirooki Goto for the IWGP Heavyweight Championship	
10	The New Beginning in Niigata	February 14, 2016	Nagaoka, Japan	Aore Nagaoka	3,603	Hiroshi Tanahashi vs. Kenny Omega for the vacant IWGP Intercontinental Championship	
11	The New Beginning in Sapporo (2017)	February 5, 2017	Sapporo, Japan	Hokkaido Prefectural Sports Center	5,545	Kazuchika Okada (c) vs. Minoru Suzuki for the IWGP Heavyweight Championship	
12	The New Beginning in Osaka (2017)	February 11, 2017	Osaka, Japan	Osaka Prefectural Gymnasium	5,466	Tetsuya Naito (c) vs. Michael Elgin for the IWGP Intercontinental Championship	
13	The New Beginning in Sapporo (2018)	January 27, 2018	Sapporo, Japan	Hokkaido Prefectural Sports Center	4,862	Hiroshi Tanahashi (c) vs. Minoru Suzuki for the IWGP Intercontinental Championship	
14	The New Beginning in Sapporo (2018)	January 28, 2018	Sapporo, Japan	Hokkaido Prefectural Sports Center	5,140	Kenny Omega (c) vs. Jay White for the IWGP United States Heavyweight Championship	
15	The New Beginning in Osaka (2018)	February 10, 2018	Osaka, Japan	Osaka Prefectural Gymnasium	5,481	Kazuchika Okada (c) vs. Sanada for the IWGP Heavyweight Championship	
16	The New Beginning USA (2019)	January 30, 2019	Los Angeles, California, USA	Globe Theatre	531	LifeBlood (Juice Robinson and Tracy Williams) vs. Roppongi Vice (Beretta and Rocky Romero)	
17	The New Beginning USA (2019)	February 1, 2019	Charlotte, North Carolina, USA	Grady Cole Center	969	Juice Robinson (c) vs. Beretta for the IWGP United States Heavyweight Championship	
18	The New Beginning USA (2019)	February 2, 2019	Nashville, Tennessee, USA	War Memorial Auditorium	618	LifeBlood (Juice Robinson, David Finlay and Tracy Williams) vs. Chaos (Beretta, Chuckie T. and Rocky Romero) in a six-man tag team elimination match	
19	The New Beginning in Sapporo (2019)	February 2, 2019	Sapporo, Japan	Hokkaido Prefectural Sports Center	4,868	Kazuchika Okada and Hiroshi Tanahashi vs. Bullet Club (Bad Luck Fale and Jay White)	
20	The New Beginning in Sapporo (2019)	February 3, 2019	Sapporo, Japan	Hokkaido Prefectural Sports Center	6,089	Tetsuya Naito (c) vs. Taichi for the IWGP Intercontinental Championship	
21	The New Beginning in Osaka (2019)	February 11, 2019	Osaka, Japan	Osaka Prefectural Gymnasium	5,570	Hiroshi Tanahashi (c) vs. Jay White for the IWGP Heavyweight Championship	
22	The New Beginning USA (2020)	January 24, 2020	St. Petersburg, Florida, USA	St. Petersburg Coliseum	863	Taguchi Japan (Hiroshi Tanahashi, David Finlay and Juice Robinson) and Rocky Romero vs. Bullet Club (Chase Owens, Tanga Loa, Tama Tonga, Yujiro Takahashi and Jado) in an Eight-man tag team elimination match	
23	The New Beginning USA (2020)	January 26, 2020	Nashville, Tennessee, USA	War Memorial Auditorium	560	FinJuice (David Finlay and Juice Robinson) and Rocky Romero vs. Bullet Club (Chase Owens, Tanga Loa, Tama Tonga)	
24	The New Beginning USA (2020)	January 27, 2020	Durham, North Carolina, USA	Durham Armory	637	Taguchi Japan (Hiroshi Tanahashi, David Finlay and Juice Robinson) and Yoshi-Hashi vs. Bullet Club (Chase Owens, Tanga Loa, Tama Tonga, Yujiro Takahashi and Jado)	
25	The New Beginning USA (2020)	January 30, 2020	Pembroke Pines, Florida, USA	Charles F. Dodge City Center	525	Hiroshi Tanahashi and Rocky Romero vs. Guerrillas of Destiny (Tanga Loa and Tama Tonga)	
26	The New Beginning USA (2020)	February 1, 2020	Cumberland, Georgia, USA	Coca-Cola Roxy at The Battery Atlanta	855	FinJuice (David Finlay and Juice Robinson) (c) vs. Guerrillas of Destiny (Tanga Loa and Tama Tonga) for the IWGP Tag Team Championship	
27	The New Beginning in Sapporo (2020)	February 1, 2020	Sapporo, Japan	Hokkaido Prefectural Sports Center	4,569	Hirooki Goto (c) vs. Shingo Takagi for the NEVER Openweight Championship	
28	The New Beginning in Sapporo (2020)	February 2, 2020	Sapporo, Japan	Hokkaido Prefectural Sports Center	5,690	Kazuchika Okada vs. Taichi	
29	The New Beginning in Osaka (2020)	February 9, 2020	Osaka, Japan	Osaka-jō Hall	11,411	Tetsuya Naito (c) vs. Kenta for the IWGP Heavyweight Championship and the IWGP Intercontinental Championship	
30	The New Beginning in Nagoya (2021)	January 30, 2021	Nagoya, Japan	Aichi Prefectural Gymnasium	2,156	Shingo Takagi (c) vs. Hiroshi Tanahashi for the NEVER Openweight Championship	
31	The New Beginning in Hiroshima (2021)	February 10, 2021	Hiroshima, Japan	Hiroshima Sun Plaza Hall	1,135	Hiromu Takahashi (c) vs. Sho for the IWGP Junior Heavyweight Championship	
31	The New Beginning in Hiroshima (2021)	February 11, 2021	Hiroshima, Japan	Hiroshima Sun Plaza Hall	2,007	Kota Ibushi (c) vs. Sanada for the IWGP Heavyweight Championship and IWGP Intercontinental Championship	
32	The New Beginning USA (2021)	February 19, 2021	Port Hueneme, California, USA	Oceanview Pavilion	0	El Phantasmo vs. Lio Rush	
32	The New Beginning USA (2021)	February 26, 2021	Port Hueneme, California, USA	Oceanview Pavilion	0	Jon Moxley (c) vs. Kenta for the IWGP United States Heavyweight Championship	
33	The New Beginning USA (2022)	January 15, 2022	Seattle, Washington, USA	Washington Hall	516	Tom Lawlor (c) vs. Tyler Rust for the Strong Openweight Championship	
34	The New Beginning in Nagoya (2023)	January 22, 2023	Nagoya, Japan	Aichi Prefectural Gymnasium	1,650	Shingo Takagi (c) vs. Great-O-Khan in a mixed martial arts rules match for the Provisional KOPW 2023 Championship	
35	The New Beginning in Sapporo (2023)	February 4, 2023	Sapporo, Japan	Hokkaido Prefectural Sports Center	3,073	Shota Umino vs. Tetsuya Naito	
36	The New Beginning in Sapporo (2023)	February 5, 2023	Sapporo, Japan	Hokkaido Prefectural Sports Center	3,316	Hiromu Takahashi (c) vs. Yoh for the IWGP Junior Heavyweight Championship	
37	The New Beginning in Osaka (2023)	February 11, 2023	Osaka, Japan	Osaka Prefectural Gymnasium	4,055	Kazuchika Okada (c) vs. Shingo Takagi for the IWGP World Heavyweight Championship	
38	The New Beginning in Nagoya (2024)	January 20, 2024	Nagoya, Japan	Aichi Prefectural Gymnasium	2,710	Tama Tonga (c) vs. Evil in a Lumberjack match for the NEVER Openweight Championship	
39	The New Beginning in Osaka (2024)	February 11, 2024	Osaka, Japan	Osaka Prefectural Gymnasium	5,400	United Empire (Will Ospreay, Francesco Akira, TJP, Jeff Cobb and Henare) vs. Bullet Club War Dogs (David Finlay, Gabe Kidd, Alex Coughlin, Clark Connors and Drilla Moloney) in a Steel Cage match	
40	The New Beginning in Sapporo (2024)	February 23, 2024	Sapporo, Japan	Hokkaido Prefectural Sports Center	3,231	David Finlay (c) vs. Nic Nemeth for the IWGP Global Heavyweight Championship	
41	The New Beginning in Sapporo (2024)	February 24, 2024	Sapporo, Japan	Hokkaido Prefectural Sports Center	5,355	Tetsuya Naito (c) vs. Sanada for the IWGP World Heavyweight Championship	
42	The New Beginning in Osaka (2025)	February 11, 2025	Osaka, Japan	Osaka Prefectural Gymnasium	5,502	Zack Sabre Jr. (c) vs. Hirooki Goto for the IWGP World Heavyweight Championship	
43	The New Beginning in Osaka (2026)	February 11, 2026	Osaka, Japan	Osaka Prefectural Gymnasium	5,507	Yota Tsuji (c) vs. Jake Lee for the IWGP Heavyweight Championship	
44	The New Beginning USA (2026)	February 27, 2026	Trenton, New Jersey, USA	CURE Insurance Arena	2,605	Yota Tsuji (c) vs. Andrade El Ídolo for the IWGP Global Heavyweight Championship	
(c) – refers to the champion(s) heading into the match

== See also ==
- List of New Japan Pro-Wrestling pay-per-view events
