= Dominion 6.15 in Osaka-jo Hall =

2025 New Japan Pro-Wrestling event

- Official poster featuring Hirooki Goto, Shingo Takagi, Yota Tsuji, Gabe Kidd, Hiroshi Tanahashi, and Yuya Uemura
- Promotion: New Japan Pro-Wrestling
- Date: June 15, 2025
- City: Osaka, Japan
- Venue: Osaka-jō Hall
- Attendance: 6,525

Event chronology
← Previous; Resurgence	Next → Fantastica Mania Mexico

Dominion chronology
← Previous; 6.9	Next → 6.14

Dominion 6.15 in Osaka-jo Hall was a professional wrestling event promoted by New Japan Pro-Wrestling (NJPW). The event took place on June 15, 2025, in Osaka, Osaka at the Osaka-jō Hall. It was the 17th event under the Dominion name and eleventh in a row to take place at the Osaka-jō Hall.

== Production ==
=== Storylines ===
Dominion 6.15 in Osaka-jo Hall featured professional wrestling matches that involved different wrestlers from pre-existing scripted feuds and storylines. Wrestlers portrayed villains, heroes, or less distinguishable characters in the scripted events that built tension and culminated in a wrestling match or series of matches.

=== Event ===
The event started with the preshow tag team confrontation between "Young Lion" teams of Daiki Nagai and Masatora Yasuda, and Katsuya Murashima and Shoma Kato, with the victory going to the latter.

In the first main card bout, Sanada, Ren Narita, Yujiro Takahashi were scheduled to face Drilla Moloney, Clark Connors, Taiji Ishimori, and Chase Owens by teaming up with a mystery partner. The latter was revealed to be Bad Luck Fale who cut ties with the Bullet Club and aligned himself with House of Torture. The Bullet Club War Dogs contingent picked up the defeat after Chase Owens turned on them and also joined forces with House of Torture. Next up, Zack Sabre Jr. and Ryohei Oiwa picked up a victory over El Phantasmo and Shota Umino in tag team competition. The fourth bout saw Hiroshi Tanahashi defeating Yuya Uemura in one of Tanahashi's retirement road bouts. In the fifth bout, Sho was initially scheduled to team up with Yoshinobu Kanemaru to face Yoh and Master Wato for the IWGP Junior Heavyweight Tag Team Championship. On the night of the event it was announced that Kanemaru was unable to compete due to injury and was replaced by Douki who joined forces with House of Torture, subsequently betraying his previous unit of Just 4 Guys. Sho and Douki proceeded to win the junior tag titles, ending Wato and Yoh's reign at 47 days and no defenses. Next up, Tomohiro Ishii and Taichi defeated Great-O-Khan and Callum Newman to win the IWGP Tag Team Championship, ending the latter team's reign at 50 days and no defenses. Next up, Boltin Oleg defeated Konosuke Takeshita to win the NEVER Openweight Championship, ending the latter's reign at 162 days and six defenses. In the eighth match, Evil defeated David Finlay in a Dog Collar chain deathmatch.

In the semi main event, Gabe Kidd defeated Yota Tsuji to win the IWGP Global Heavyweight Championship, ending the latter's reign at 162 days and four defenses. After the bout concluded, Kidd nominated Hiroshi Tanahashi as his next challenger.

In the main event, Hirooki Goto defeated Shingo Takagi to secure the seventh consecutive defense of the IWGP World Heavyweight Championship in that respective reign.

== Results ==
No.	Results	Stipulations	Times
1^{P}	Katsuya Murashima and Shoma Kato defeated Daiki Nagai and Masatora Yasuda	Tag team match	8:15
2	House of Torture (Sanada, Ren Narita, Yujiro Takahashi and Don Fale) defeated Bullet Club War Dogs (Drilla Moloney, Clark Connors, Taiji Ishimori, and Chase Owens)	Eight-man tag team match	6:42
3	TMDK (Zack Sabre Jr. and Ryohei Oiwa) (with Hartley Jackson) defeated El Phantasmo and Shota Umino (with Jado)	Tag team match	11:23
4	Hiroshi Tanahashi defeated Yuya Uemura	Singles match	9:30
5	House of Torture (Sho and Douki (Note: Yoshinobu Kanemaru was initially scheduled to team up with Sho but pulled out due to a feigned arm injury and was replaced by Douki on the night of the event.)) defeated Yoh and Master Wato (c)	Tag team match for the IWGP Junior Heavyweight Tag Team Championship	10:52
6	Tomohiro Ishii and Taichi defeated United Empire (Great-O-Khan and Callum Newman) (c)	Tag team match for the IWGP Tag Team Championship	12:46
7	Boltin Oleg defeated Konosuke Takeshita (c)	Singles match for the NEVER Openweight Championship	13:12
8	Evil defeated David Finlay	Dog Collar Deathmatch	23:04
9	Gabe Kidd defeated Yota Tsuji (c)	Singles match for the IWGP Global Heavyweight Championship	23:24
10	Hirooki Goto (c) defeated Shingo Takagi	Singles match for the IWGP World Heavyweight Championship	28:25
(c) / – the champion(s) heading into the match; P / – the match was broadcast on the pre-show
