= The New Beginning in Osaka (2023) =

2023 professional wrestling event

- Promotion: New Japan Pro-Wrestling
- Date: February 11, 2023
- City: Osaka, Japan
- Venue: Osaka Prefectural Gymnasium
- Attendance: 4,055

Event chronology
| ← Previous; Road to The New Beginning | Next → Battle in the Valley |

The New Beginning chronology
| ← Previous; Sapporo (2023) | Next → Nagoya (2024) |

The New Beginning in Osaka was a professional wrestling event promoted by New Japan Pro-Wrestling (NJPW). The event took place on February 11, 2023 in Osaka at the Osaka Prefectural Gymnasium. It was the thirty-sixth event under the New Beginning name and the seventh to take place in Osaka, with the last back in 2020.

== Production ==
=== Background ===
NJPW held the inaugural The New Beginning event on February 15, 2011, with future events going on to take place annually during January and February. In 2022, New Beginning events were absent, aside from The New Beginning USA.

=== Storylines ===
The New Beginning in Osaka featured professional wrestling matches that involves different wrestlers from pre-existing scripted feuds and storylines. Wrestlers portrayed villains, heroes, or less distinguishable characters in scripted events that built tension and culminated in a wrestling match or series of matches.

At Wrestle Kingdom 17 night 1, Kazuchika Okada defeated Jay White to win the IWGP World Heavyweight Championship for the second time. After the match, Shingo Takagi came to the ring and challenged Okada for the IWGP World Heavyweight Championship. A match was set for The New Beginning in Osaka. At The New Beginning in Nagoya, Takagi would defeat Great-O-Khan to retain both the Provisional KOPW Championship and his IWGP World Heavyweight Championship match.

At New Year Dash!!, Hiroshi Tanahashi, Tama Tonga, Hikuleo, and Master Wato defeated Taiji Ishimori, El Phantasmo, Kenta and Jay White. However, the Bullet Club immediately attacked their opponents, with White laying out Hikuleo with steel chair shots. He cut a promo blaming Hikuleo for his loss against Okada at Wrestle Kingdom 17 night 1, setting the stage for a Loser Leaves Japan match.

== Event ==
Other on-screen personnel
| Role: | Name: |
|---|---|
| English Commentators | Kevin Kelly |
| English Commentators | Chris Charlton |
| English Commentators | Gino Gambino |
| Japanese Commentators | Shinpei Nogami |
| Japanese Commentators | Milano Collection A.T. |
| Japanese Commentators | Katsuhiko Kanazawa |
| Japanese Commentators | Kazuyoshi Sakai |
| Ring announcers | Hidekazu Tanaka |
| Ring announcers | Kimihiko Ozaki |
| Ring announcers | Makoto Abe |
| Referees | Kenta Sato |
| Referees | Yuya Sakamoto |
| Referees | Marty Asami |

The event started with a match between Aaron Henare and Great-O-Khan and Oskar Leube and Toru Yano. The former won after a jumping knee and strike and Rampage from Henare to Leube.

Next, Los Ingobernables de Japon took on Tiger Mask, Shota Umino, Tomoaki Honma and Ryusuke Taguchi. In the end, Hiromu Takahashi delivered a superkick, the Hiromu Chan Bomber and a Time Bomb on Taguchi for the win. After the match, Lio Rush challenged Takahashi to a championship match, which Takahashi accepted.

Next, Master Wato faces Taiji Ishimori. In the end, as Wato was looking for Recientemente, Ishimori countered into a jumping knee strike, then delivered a lariat and hit the Bloody Cross for the victory.

Next, Hiroshi Tanahashi took on Kenta. In the latter stages, as Kenta was going for the GTS, Tanahashi reversed it into a slingblade and hit the High Fly Flow to pickup the victory.

Next, House of Torture defended the Never Openweight Six-Man Tag Team Championship against Strong Style. In the end, El Desperado, Minoru Suzuki and Ren Narita applied various submission holds on all House of Torture members, forcing them to submit, and therefore losing the titles. After the match, Suzuki named the team Strong Style.

The next bout was a Loser Leaves Japan match between Hikuer and Jay White. The former won after delivering a Last Ride and a chokeslam for the win, and thus removing White from all NJPW activities.

The penultimate match was for the NEVER Openweight Championship contested between El Phantasmo and Tama Tonga. In the closing stages, Tonga delivered a gun stun, but Phantasmo kicked out. Tonga then hit the Jay Driller to pickup the victory.

=== Main event ===
Kazuchika Okada defended the IWGP World Heavyweight Championship against Shingo Takagi. Takagi hit a dragon suplex, but Okada responded with a dropkick. Takagi then delivered a GTR and Made in Japan, but Okada kicked out. Okada escaped the Last of the Dragon and delivered the Rainmaker. Okada looked for another Rainamker, but Takagi escaped and hit the Last of the Dragon, but Okada kicked out. Takagi delivered a headbutt and a knee drop. As Takagi was looking for a pumping bomber, Okada delivered an enzeguiri and a lariat, which led to the Cobra Flowsion and the Rainmaker for the 1-2-3 win. After the match, Okada called out Hiroshi Tanahashi to a championship match at Battle in the Valley, which Tanahashi instantly accepted.

== Results ==
| No. | Results | Stipulations | Times |
|---|---|---|---|
| 1 | United Empire (Great-O-Khan and Aaron Henare) defeated Toru Yano and Oskar Leube by pinfall | Tag team match | 6:38 |
| 2 | Los Ingobernables de Japon (Tetsuya Naito, Sanada, Hiromu Takahashi and Bushi) defeated Tomoaki Honma, Shota Umino, Tiger Mask and Ryusuke Taguchi by pinfall | Eight-man tag team match | 8:43 |
| 3 | Taiji Ishimori defeated Master Wato by pinfall | Singles match | 11:18 |
| 4 | Hiroshi Tanahashi defeated Kenta by pinfall | Singles match | 13:57 |
| 5 | Minoru Suzuki, El Desperado and Ren Narita defeated House of Torture (Evil, Yujiro Takahashi and Sho) (c) by submission | Six-man tag team match for the NEVER Openweight 6-Man Tag Team Championship | 12:51 |
| 6 | Hikuleo (with Jado) defeated Jay White (with Gedo) by pinfall | Loser Leaves Japan match | 25:08 |
| 7 | Tama Tonga (c) (with Jado) defeated El Phantasmo by pinfall | Singles match for the NEVER Openweight Championship | 27:07 |
| 8 | Kazuchika Okada (c) defeated Shingo Takagi by pinfall | Singles match for the IWGP World Heavyweight Championship | 32:07 |
(c) / – the champion(s) heading into the match
