= Douki =

Japanese professional wrestler (born 1991)

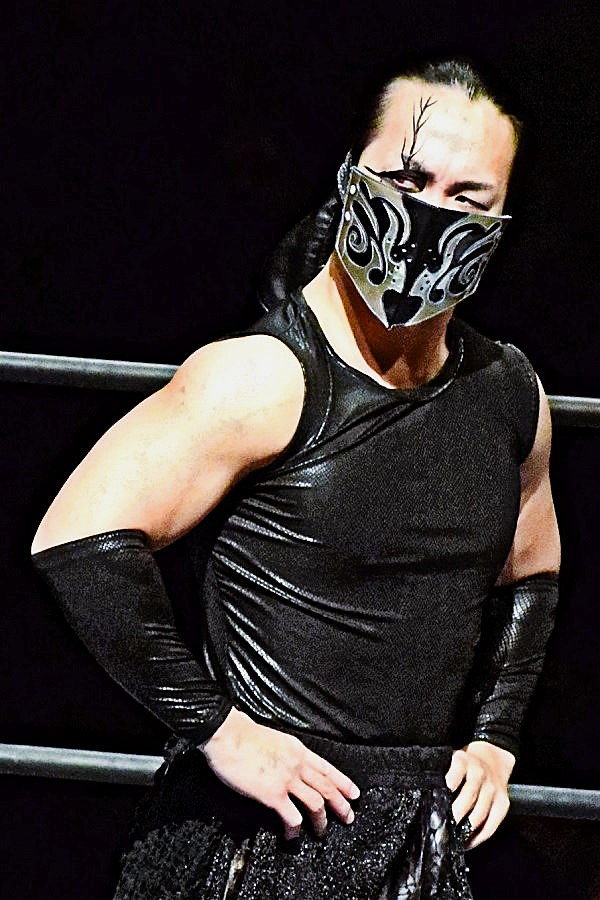
- Douki in 2024

Personal information
- Born: Tatsuya Hayama; December 24, 1991 (age 34) Yokohama, Kanagawa, Japan

Professional wrestling career
- Ring name(s): Douki; Dowki; Kansuke; Tetsuya; Tatsuya
- Billed height: 1.70 m (5 ft 7 in)
- Billed weight: 85 kg (187 lb)
- Billed from: Yokohama, Japan
- Trained by: Skayde; Último Dragón; Arturo Beristain
- Debut: November 2010

Tatsuya Hayama (葉山 達也, Hayama Tatsuya; born December 24, 1991), better known by his ring name Douki (stylised in all caps as DOUKI), is a Japanese luchador enmascarado (or masked professional wrestler). He is signed to New Japan Pro-Wrestling (NJPW), where he is a member of the House of Torture, and a former two-time IWGP Junior Heavyweight Champion

Douki was a member of Suzuki-gun from 2019 to 2022, and a member of Just 5 Guys from 2023 to 2025.

== Professional wrestling career ==
=== Early career (2010–2019) ===
In May 2010, Hayama had planned to go to Mexico by himself, but Milano Collection A.T. introduced him to Taichi. After that, he went to CMLL's wrestling school every day and practiced at the gym with Taichi, and debuted under the name Kansuke in November of the same year.

In 2012, when he joined Los Perros del Mal (a stable that was formed in December 2008), Hayama thought, "There are other Japanese wrestlers, so let's change the character." He thus adopted the ring name "Douki". He served as a member of the stable Japones del Mal. His ring name is derived from Kansuke Yamamoto's ordination name "Michiki".

After spending time in Mexico, Douki made his first appearance in Japan at a Tokyo Gurentai show on October 10, 2015.

=== New Japan Pro-Wrestling (2019–present) ===
==== Suzuki-gun (2019–2022) ====
On May 10, 2019, El Desperado had to be pulled from the Best of the Super Juniors tournament due to injury, and Taichi introduced Douki as Suzuki-gun's newest member to replace Desperado. Douki would finish with only 2 points in the tournament.

On August 1, 2020, NJPW announced a tournament to crown new NEVER Openweight 6-Man Tag Team Champions, in which Douki took part alongside Desperado and Minoru Suzuki.

In March 2022, Douki participated in the New Japan Cup, where he lost to fellow Suzuki-gun stablemate Zack Sabre Jr. in the second round. In November, Douki and Yoshinobu Kanemaru competed in the Super Junior Tag League, finishing with eight points and failing to advance to the finals.

In December, at the World Tag League and Best of the Super Juniors finals, Suzuki announced the disbandment of Suzuki-gun by the end of the year. The final match between the faction took place on December 23, where the team of Douki, Taichi, Sabre and Kanemaru defeated Suzuki, Desperado, Lance Archer and Taka Michinoku. After the match, each of the Suzuki-gun members spoke about their memories as a part of the group and thanked leader Suzuki. The night ended with all members posing with the Suzuki-gun flag, only to be interrupted by former member Takashi Iizuka, causing all nine men to pose in the ring, behind the Suzuki-gun flag.

==== Just 4 Guys / Just 5 Guys (2023–2025) ====
On January 5, 2023, at New Year Dash, Douki, alongside Taka Michinoku, Taichi and Yoshinobu Kanemaru formed Just 4 Guys with the aim of reaching the top of New Japan. On February 4, at The New Beginning in Sapporo, Douki and Kanemaru challenged Catch 2/2 (Francesco Akira and TJP) for the IWGP Junior Heavyweight Tag Team Championship, but lost. The stable's name was changed to Just 5 Guys, with the addition of Sanada during the New Japan Cup, after his defeat of Tetsuya Naito. Through NJPW's partnership with All Elite Wrestling (AEW), Douki made his AEW debut on the June 23 episode of Rampage, losing to "Jungle Boy" Jack Perry. On June 25, at Forbidden Door, Douki accompanied Sanada for the latter's successful IWGP world title defense against Perry. On July 5, at New Japan Soul, Douki defeated El Desperado to capture his first championship, becoming the IWGP Junior Heavyweight Champion. Douki would reign as champion until January 4, 2025, at Wrestle Kingdom 19, losing the title back to Desperado via referee stoppage after injuring his arm while performing a diving senton to the outside of the ring.

==== House of Torture (2025–present) ====
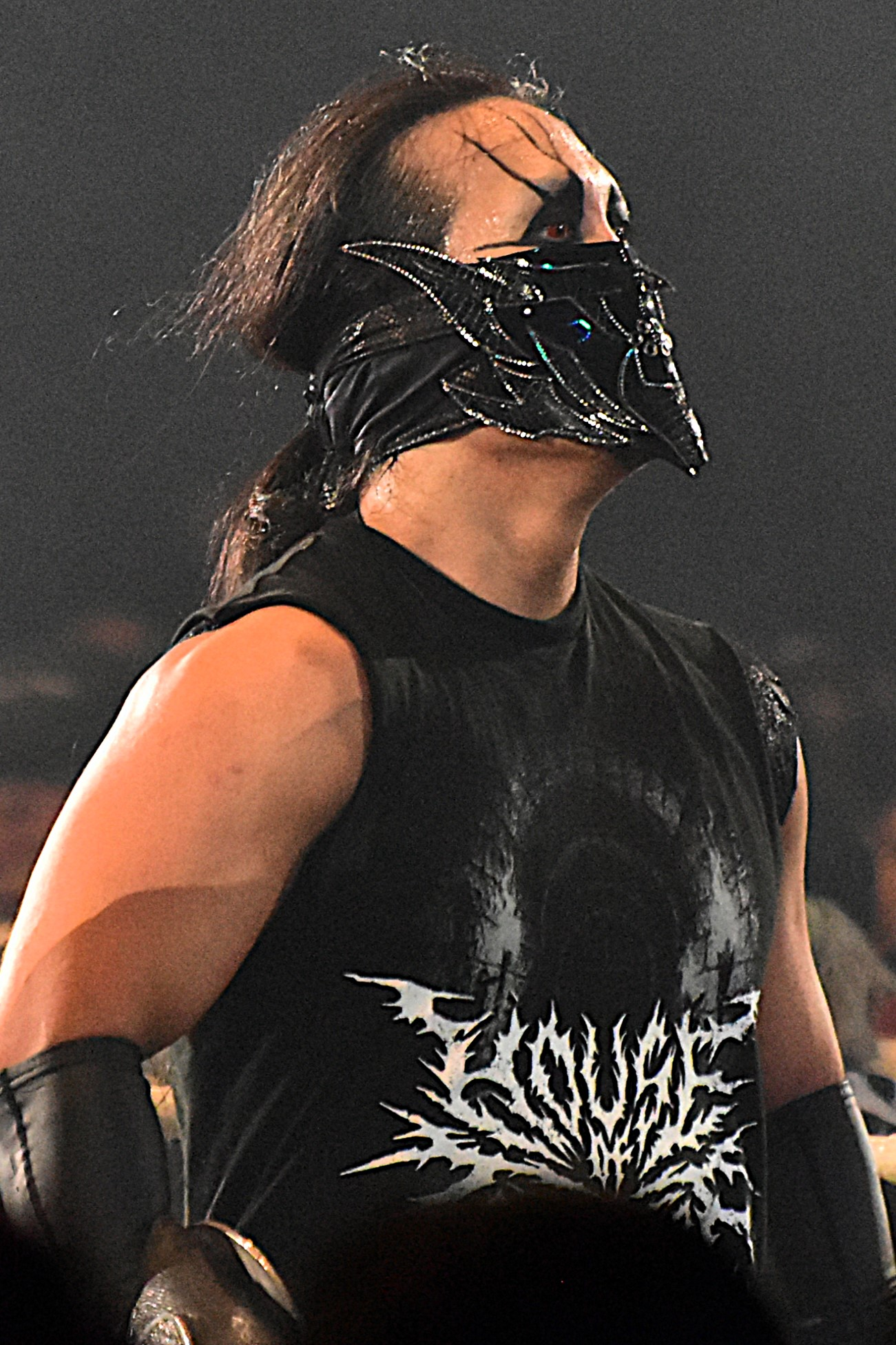
Douki at Dominion 6.15 in Osaka-jo Hall as a member of House of Torture

On June 15, 2025, at Dominion 6.15 in Osaka-jo Hall, Douki turned heel and joined House of Torture. Douki would team with Sho to win the IWGP Junior Heavyweight Tag Team Championship from Master Wato and Yoh. On October 6, Douki defeated El Desperado to win the IWGP Junior Heavyweight Championship for the second time, making him a double champion.

Douki and Sho would lose the tag titles on January 5, 2026 at New Year Dash!! to the Ichiban Sweet Boys (Kosei Fujita and Robbie Eagles), ending their reign at 204 days. In the following months, Douki would successfully defended his Junior Heavyweight title against El Desperado, Yoh, and Tiger Mask before losing it to Yoh in a rematch on June 14 at Dominion 6.14 in Osaka-jo Hall, ending his reign at 251 days.

== Championships and accomplishments ==
- New Japan Pro-Wrestling
  - IWGP Junior Heavyweight Championship (2 times)
  - IWGP Junior Heavyweight Tag Team Championship (1 time) – with Sho
  - Super Jr. Tag League (2025) – with Sho
- Pro Wrestling Illustrated
  - Ranked No. 176 of the top 500 singles wrestlers in the PWI 500 in 2024

== Luchas de Apuestas record ==
| Winner (wager) | Loser (wager) | Location | Event | Date | Notes |
|---|---|---|---|---|---|
| Dowki and Daisuke Hanaoka (mask) | Los Hermanos Celestick (I & II) (mask) | Mexico City, Mexico | Live event | June 15, 2013 | |
