= Yoh (wrestler) =

Japanese professional wrestler (born 1988)

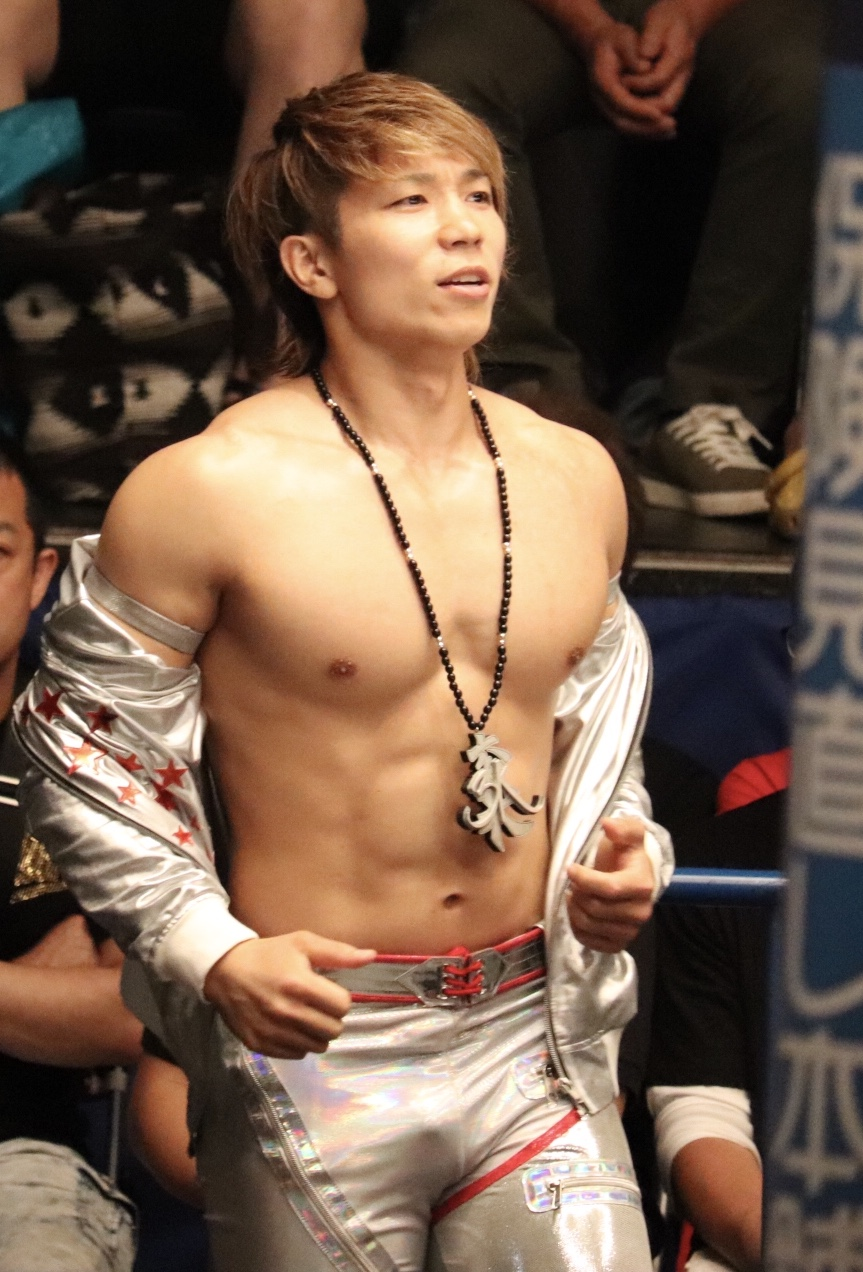
- Yoh in July 2018

Personal information
- Born: Yohei Komatsu; June 25, 1988 (age 38) Kurihara, Miyagi, Japan
- Website: Twitter

Professional wrestling career
- Ring name(s): Fujin; Yohei Komatsu; Yo; Yoh; Yohey
- Billed height: 171.5 cm (5 ft 7.5 in)
- Billed weight: 85 kg (187 lb)
- Trained by: NJPW Dojo; Junji Hirata; Tetsuya Naito
- Debut: November 19, 2012

Yohei Komatsu (小松 洋平, Komatsu Yōhei) (born June 25, 1988), better known by his ring name Yoh (stylised in all caps), is a Japanese professional wrestler. He is signed to New Japan Pro-Wrestling (NJPW), where he is the current IWGP Junior Heavyweight Champion in his first reign.

After returning from his excursion, he was a part of the junior heavyweight tag team Roppongi 3K, along with Sho. The tag team were five-time IWGP Junior Heavyweight Tag Team Champions and three-time winners of the Super Junior Tag League. Additionally, Yoh is a one-time IWGP Junior Heavyweight Tag Team Champion (with Master Wato), a two-time NEVER Openweight 6-Man Tag Team Champion (the first alongside Hirooki Goto and Yoshi-Hashi), and won the Super Junior Tag League with Lio Rush. From 2017 to 2025, Yoh was a member of Chaos.

He has previously also worked for the American promotion Ring of Honor (ROH) and Mexican promotion Consejo Mundial de Lucha Libre (CMLL). In the latter promotion, he was known under the ring name Fujin (風神, Fūjin), named after the Japanese God of the wind, and was part of La Ola Amarilla ("the Yellow Wave") alongside Okumura, Kamaitachi and Raijin (the name Sho worked under in Mexico).

== Early life ==
Komatsu was born on June 26, 1988, in Kurihara, Miyagi, Japan where he also grew up. He became interested in professional wrestling by watching it on television with his parents from the age of three. While in school he joined the wrestling club, learning amateur wrestling at a young age.

== Professional wrestling career ==
After graduating from university, Komatsu began training for his professional wrestling career at the New Japan Pro-Wrestling (NJPW) dojo. Initially, he worked a part-time job while trying to pass the NJPW "Young Lions" test, which he finally passed in May 2012.

=== New Japan Pro-Wrestling (2012–present) ===
==== Young Lion (2012–2016) ====
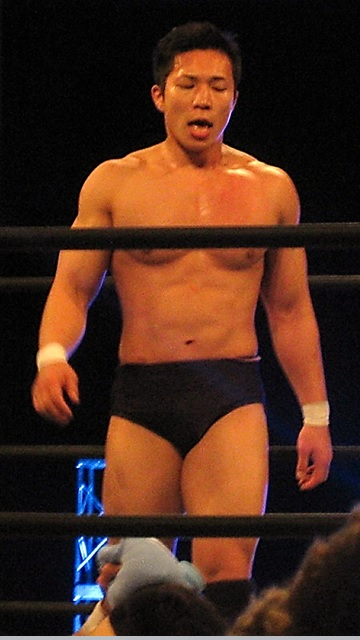
Komatsu in March 2015

He made his debut for NJPW on November 19, 2012, on NJPW's NEVER project's Shodai NEVER Musabetsu Kyu Oza Kettei Tournament show where he lost to Takaaki Watanabe. Komatsu competed as one of NJPW's "Young Lions", a class of rookie wrestlers who work mostly against each other early on, wearing all black gear and with no particular ring character, all part of the structured learning process in NJPW. In 2013, he competed in his first major NJPW tournament, teaming up with Kushida to compete in the 2013 Super Junior Tag Tournament. The team lost in the first round to Bushi and Valiente. On January 4, 2014 Komatsu teamed up with Jyushin Thunder Liger, Manabu Nakanishi and Super Strong Machine to work a non-televised match at Wrestle Kingdom 8, NJPW's biggest show of the year. The team lost to Bushi, Captain New Japan, Hiroyoshi Tenzan and Tomoaki Honma. Throughout 2013 and 2014, Komatsu often faced off against fellow Young Lion Sho Tanaka, with both men trading victories in both singles and tag team competition. By 2015, Komatsu and Tanaka had begun teaming together on a regular basis, including working together in the New Japan Rumble as part of Wrestle Kingdom 9 on January 5, 2015. The two teamed up to eliminate Tiger Mask and Taichi but were both eliminated by Tama Tonga. On January 15, 2015, Komatsu competed at the Fantastica Mania 2015 event as he was called upon to replace the injured Rey Cometa in the NJPW/Consejo Mundial de Lucha Libre (CMLL) co-promoted event. The team of Komatsu and Kushida lost to Bárbaro Cavernario and Yoshi-Hashi. On February 11 at The New Beginning in Osaka, Komatsu lost to Tanaka and three days later Komatsu and Satoshi Kojima lost to Captain New Japan and Nakanishi. The Invasion Attack 2015 show saw Komatsu, Alex Shelley, Captain New Japan, Kushida and Yuji Nagata defeated Liger, Nakanishi, Ryusuke Taguchi, Sho Tanaka and Tiger Mask.

He was announced to be one of 16 wrestlers selected to be part of the 2015 Best of the Super Juniors tournament. However, he would go on to lose all his qualifying matches. On July 5, 2015, at Dominion 7.5 in Osaka-jo Hall, Nakanishi, Máscara Dorada, Taguchi, Tanaka and Nagata defeated Hiroyoshi Tenzan, Liger, Kojima, Tiger Mask and Komatsu in the untelevised first match of the night. His next match at a major NJPW show was on September 23, 2015 at Destruction in Okayama where he, Tanaka, Katsuyori Shibata and Nagata defeated David Finlay, Jay White, Nakanishi and Tetsuya Naito. A few days later, at Destruction in Kobe, Komatsu and Tanaka defeated fellow Young Lions Finlay and White. In early 2016, it was announced that Komatsu and Tanaka would compete in the 2016 Fantastica Mania series of shows, competing in what NJPW called the "Yohei Komatsu and Sho Tanaka send-off game", announcing that the two would travel to Mexico and work for CMLL as part of their continued in-ring skill development. The team worked the opening match for each of the six Fantastica Mania events, losing each time. On the last night, Tetsuya Naito, Komatsu's original trainer, called Komatsu to the ring and implied that he was going to join Naito's stable Los Ingobernables de Japón, but then proceeded to beat him up with Evil.

==== Roppongi 3K (2017–2021) ====
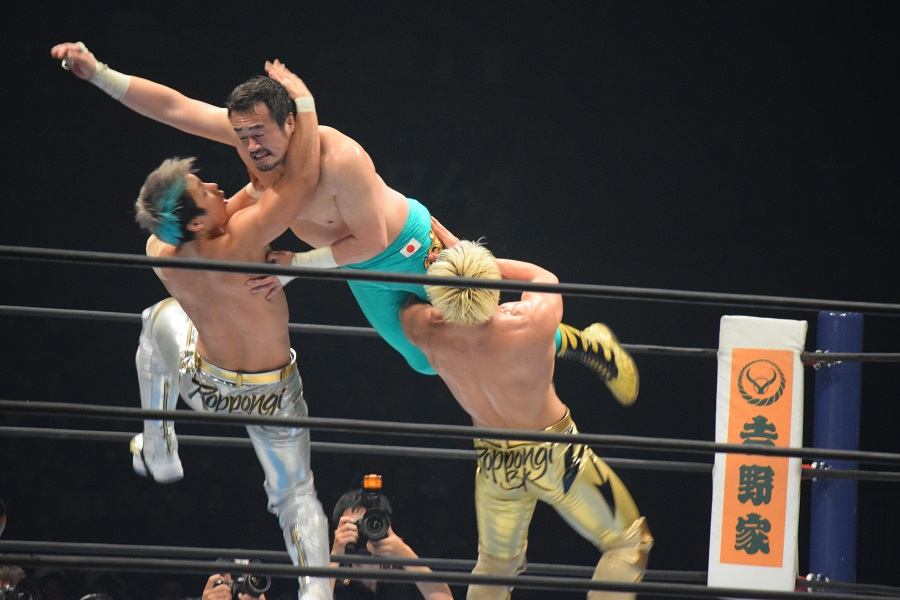
Roppongi 3K performing the 3K on Ryusuke Taguchi

On October 9, 2017, at King of Pro-Wrestling, Komatsu and Tanaka, billed as "Yoh" and "Sho", returned to NJPW, when they were revealed as Rocky Romero's new tag team Roppongi 3K. The two defeated Funky Future (Ricochet and Ryusuke Taguchi) in their return match to become the new IWGP Junior Heavyweight Tag Team Champions. Through their affiliation with Romero, Yoh and Sho also became part of the Chaos stable. On November 5 at Power Struggle, Roppongi 3K defeated Super 69 (ACH and Ryusuke Taguchi) in the finals to win the 2017 Super Jr. Tag Tournament. On January 4, 2018, Roppongi 3K lost the Junior Heavyweight Tag Team Championship to The Young Bucks (Matt Jackson and Nick Jackson) at Wrestle Kingdom 12, but won it back on January 28 at the New Beginning in Sapporo. In May 2018, Yoh entered his second Best of the Super Juniors tournament. He finished the tournament with 3 wins and 4 losses, failing to advance to the finals. In October, Sho and Yoh entered the 2018 Super Junior Tag League, winning the tournament for the second time in a row to face El Desperado and Yoshinobu Kanemaru at Wrestle Kingdom 13. However, an earlier loss to the team of Shingo Takagi and Bushi made the title match a triple threat, which Takagi and Bushi would go on to win, with Takagi pinning Sho. At New Japan’s 47th Anniversary Event, Sho and Yoh would defeat Takagi and Bushi to win the championship for a third time. In June, Roppongi 3K would lose the Junior Tag Team Championship to the team of El Phantasmo and Taiji Ishimori. In November, Sho and Yoh would win the Super Junior Tag League for the third time in a row. At Wrestle Kingdom 14, Roppongi 3K would defeat Phantasmo and Ishimori to win the titles for the fourth time. Roppongi 3K would make their first successful title defense against Desperado and Kanemaru at The New Beginning in Osaka. They would make their second successful title defense against Rocky Romero and Ryusuke Taguchi on the first night of the New Japan Road tour. Following New Japan’s return to producing wrestling shows, Yoh entered the 2020 New Japan Cup, losing to Bushi in the first round. During this match, Yoh tore his left ACL, which kept him out of action for the rest of 2020.

Yoh returned to NJPW during the finals of the 2021 New Japan Cup. Later that year along with partner Sho, Yoh entered the Super Junior Tag League. Despite entering as favourites and former winners, the pair struggled to pick up any wins. On August 16, 2021, following a loss to Suzuki-gun, Sho attacked Yoh, ending their eight-year partnership.

==== Singles competition (2021–present) ====
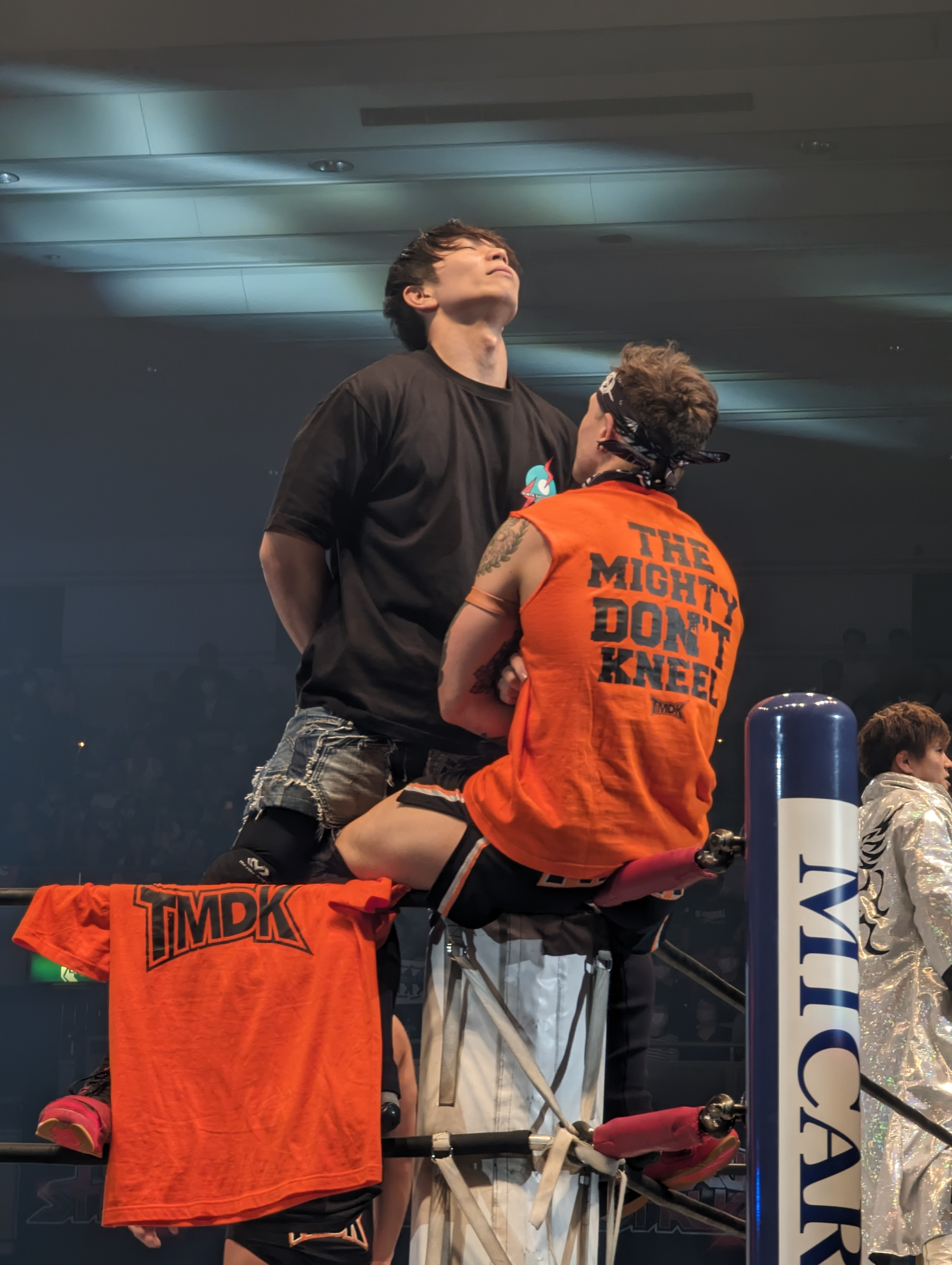
Yoh in November 2023, taunting Robbie Eagles

Following Sho's betrayal, the two faced off at Wrestle Grand Slam in MetLife Dome, where Sho defeated Yoh via referee stoppage. After the match, Sho joined Bullet Club, accepting a shirt from Evil, Yujiro Takahashi and Dick Togo, hence joining their sub-group House of Torture. Following the loss, Yoh was inactive in the ring, until November, when he participated in the Best of the Super Juniors tournament. Yoh finished second in the block, ending with 14 points and advancing to the finals, after avenging his loss to Sho on the final day. In the finals, Yoh lost to Hiromu Takahashi. At Wrestle Kingdom 16, Yoh teamed with Hirooki Goto and Yoshi-Hashi, in a losing effort to House of Torture for the NEVER Openweight 6-Man Tag Team Championship.

During the Golden Series tour in February, the duo lost in a rematch to House of Torture. The following month, Yoh entered the 2022 New Japan Cup, but lost to Hiroshi Tanahashi in the first round. In May, Yoh entered the Best of the Super Juniors tournament, competing in the A Block. Yoh ended his tournament campaign with 8 points, failing to advance to the finals. In July, Yoh, Goto, and Yoshi-Hashi defeated House of Torture to win the NEVER Openweight 6-Man Tag Team Championship. The trio lost the titles in a rematch to House of Torture in September at Burning Spirit In November, Yoh teamed with new Chaos stablemate Lio Rush in the Super Junior Tag League. The duo finished joint top of the block with 14 points, advancing to the finals. In the finals, Yoh and Rush defeated Bullet Club's Ace Austin and Chris Bey, to win Yoh's record fourth Super Junior Tag League. The duo earnt their title shot at Wrestle Kingdom 17, where they lost to IWGP Junior Heavyweight Tag Team Champions Catch 2/2 (TJP and Francesco Akira).

At The New Beginning in Sapporo, Yoh faced Hiromu Takahashi for the IWGP Junior Heavyweight Championship, but was defeated. In May, Yoh entered the 2023 Best of the Super Juniors, competing in the B Block. Yoh finished the tournament with 12 points, narrowly missing out on advancing to the semi-finals. As Rush was unavailable for the Super Junior Tag League due to illness, Yoh made a surprise appearance at Michinoku Pro Wrestling's anniversary show and confronted Musashi, who he had known since high school. Musashi accepted his invitation, but they finished eighth in the block with eight points.

Yoh as the IWGP Junior Heavyweight Champion.

At Sakura Genesis, he faced Sho for the IWGP Junior Heavyweight Championship. During the match, he suffered a dislocated shoulder, forcing referee stoppage. The injury kept him out for 6 months. He returned in October and participated in the 2024 Super Junior Tag League, teaming with Rocky Romero as Roppongi Revice, but finished fifth in their block. Roppongi ReVice would unsuccessfully challenge for both the IWGP Junior Heavyweight Tag Team Championships and the NJPW Strong Openweight Tag Team Championships.

Yoh would start teaming with Master Wato, and won the IWGP Junior Heavyweight Tag Team Championships, beating Ichiban Sweet Boys (Kosei Fujita & Robbie Eagles) at Wrestling Hizen No Kuni on the 29th of April. He entered the Best of the Super Juniors 32, and topped his block with 12 points with wins over El Desperado, Taiji Ishimori, and Kevin Knight. In the final, he lost to Fujita. At Dominion, Yoh and Wato would lose their Junior Tag Team Championships to House of Torture (Douki & Sho). During the New Japan Soul Tour, Yoh and Wato would team with Toru Yano to win the NEVER Openweight 6-Man Tag Team Championships beating Ren Narita, Sho and Yujiro Takahashi. Yoh and Wato participated in the 2025 Super Junior Tag League, but missed out on the finals after a loss to Sho and Douki.

Yoh, Wato and Toru Yano would lose their titles in a Ranbo to TMDK (Zack Sabre Jr., Ryohei Oiwa and Hartley Jackson) at Wrestle Kingdom 20. He would unsuccessfully challenge Douki for the IWGP Junior Heavyweight Championship during Road to Sakura Genesis. From May 14 till June 7, Yoh participated in Best of the Super Juniors 33 (B block), ending with 12 points (6—3) and finishing second in the block on tiebreak and qualifying for the semifinals as a result. He defeated Robbie Eagles in the semifinals before defeating Kosei Fujita in the final to win his first Best of the Super Juniors tournament. On June 14 at Dominion 6.14 in Osaka-jo Hall, Yoh defeated Douki to win the IWGP Junior Heavyweight Championship

=== Overseas promotions (2016–2017) ===
Komatsu and Tanaka would be the latest in a long line of young Japanese wrestlers to travel to Mexico to learn the lucha libre style. In Mexico, Komatsu was given the ring name Fujin, named after the Japanese God of Wind, teaming with Tanaka who would be known as Raijin, named after the Japanese God of Thunder. The duo made their Mexican debut on January 31, teaming up with Okumura, forming the most recent version of La Ola Amarilla ("The Yellow Wave"). The group was joined by Kamaitachi, the previous NJPW trainee who has worked for CMLL since 2014. On March 22, Fujin took part in the 2016 edition of The CMLL Torneo Gran Alternativa, a tournament in which rookies team up with veterans in a single-elimination tournament. Teaming up with Rey Escorpión, Fujin won his block, advancing to the finals of the tournament scheduled for April 5, in which they were defeated in the finals of the tournament by Esfinge and Volador Jr.

In October 2016, Komatsu and Tanaka, now billed as "Yohey" and "Sho" and known as the "Tempura Boyz", began working regularly for American promotion Ring of Honor (ROH), with whom NJPW also had a working relationship.

== Championships and accomplishments ==
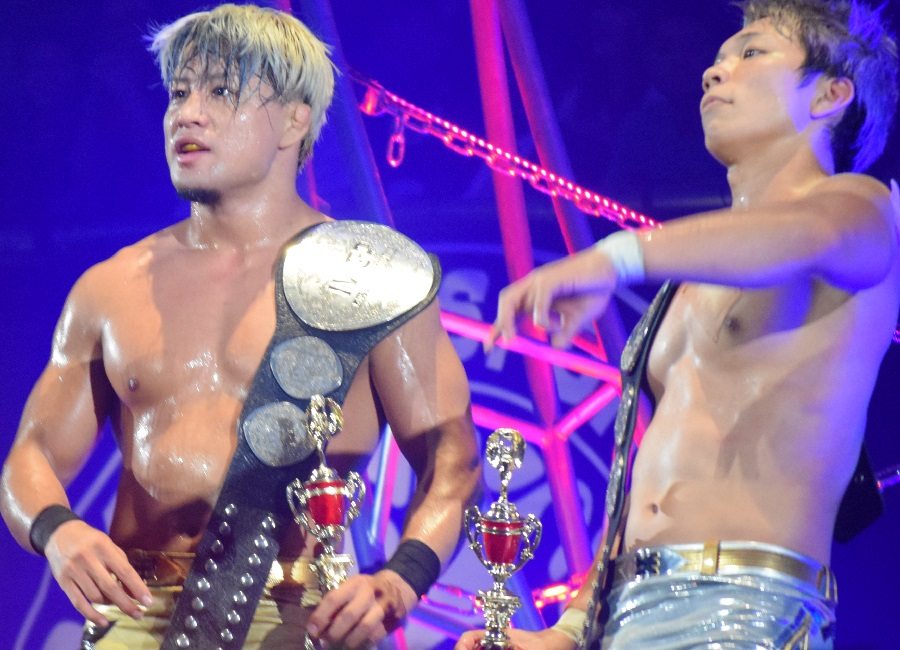
Roppongi 3K as the IWGP Junior Heavyweight Tag Team Champions and the winners of the 2017 Super Jr. Tag Tournament

- New Japan Pro-Wrestling
  - IWGP Junior Heavyweight Championship (1 time, current)
  - IWGP Junior Heavyweight Tag Team Championship (6 times) – with Sho (5) and Master Wato (1)
  - NEVER Openweight 6-Man Tag Team Championship (2 times) – with Hirooki Goto and Yoshi-Hashi (1) and Toru Yano and Master Wato (1)
  - Best of the Super Juniors (2026)
  - Super Jr. Tag Tournament/Super Junior Tag League (2017, 2018, 2019) – with Sho
  - Super Jr. Tag League (2022) – with Lio Rush
- Pro Wrestling Illustrated
  - Ranked No. 51 of the top 500 singles wrestlers in the PWI 500 in 2026
  - Ranked No. 10 of the top 50 tag teams in the PWI Tag Team 50 in 2020 – with Sho
- Wrestling Observer Newsletter awards
  - Rookie of the Year (2013)
