= Just 5 Guys =

Professional wrestling stable

- Logo of Just 5 Guys

Stable
- Members: See below
- Name(s): Just 4 Guys; Just 5 Guys
- Debut: January 5, 2023
- Disbanded: June 15, 2025
- Years active: 2023–2025

Just 5 Guys (J5G), also called Just 4 Guys (J4G) or Just 3 Guys (J3G) depending on the number of guys, was a professional wrestling stable in New Japan Pro-Wrestling (NJPW). At the time of its disbandment, its membership consisted of Taka Michinoku, Taichi, and Yuya Uemura.

The stable formed in January 2023 as Just 4 Guys, consisting of Taichi, Taka Michinoku, Douki, and Yoshinobu Kanemaru following the disbandment of their previous stable Suzuki-gun. Two months later, the stable added Sanada and took the name Just 5 Guys. The group alternated between names through membership changes.

== Background ==
Taichi and Michinoku first interacted in December in 2010 as part of Kojima-gun, which morphed into Suzuki-gun after they turned on Satoshi Kojima and appointed Minoru Suzuki as their new leader. Within Suzuki-gun, Michinoku and Taichi teamed up in NJPW's junior heavyweight tag team division in which they held the IWGP Junior Heavyweight Tag Team Championship, before Taichi moved up to the heavyweight division in March 2018. Meanwhile, in Pro Wrestling NOAH, Kanemaru would join Suzuki-gun in February 2016, as part of the stable's invasion storyline, before moving to NJPW with them in January 2017. Douki joined Suzuki-gun in May 2019, having been introduced to the stable by Taichi. All four wrestlers remained members of Suzuki-gun until the stable disbanded in December 2022.

== History ==
On January 5, 2023, at New Year Dash, Michinoku, Taichi, Douki, and Kanemaru formed Just 4 Guys with the aim of reaching the top of New Japan. On February 4, at The New Beginning in Sapporo, Taichi lost to Will Ospreay in a singles match. On the same event, Douki and Yoshinobu Kanemaru challenged for Catch 2/2 (Francesco Akira and TJP) for the IWGP Junior Heavyweight Tag Team Championship, but lost.

In March, Sanada, then a member of Los Ingobernables de Japon, entered the New Japan Cup. After he defeated LIJ stablemate and leader Tetsuya Naito in the quarter-finals, he left Los Ingobernables de Japón and joined the stable, changing the name to Just 5 Guys. Sanada defeated David Finlay in the finals of the tournament and, one month later, defeated Kazuchika Okada for the IWGP World Heavyweight Championship at Sakura Genesis. Following Sanada winning the title, he was confronted by former stablemate Hiromu Takahashi, who sought a shot at the world title. Sanada accepted, however only on the basis that Kanemaru was granted a title shot at Takahashi's IWGP Junior Heavyweight Championship, which Takahashi accepted. On April 27, Kanemaru lost to Takahashi. Two days later, at Wrestling Satsuma no Kuni, Taichi defeated Takagi to win the KOPW championship.

Following Takahashi retaining the title against Kanemaru, he faced Sanada at Wrestling Dontaku, where Sanada retained the World title. Following the match, Sanada and the remainder of Just 5 Guys were attacked by the returning and new member of LIJ Yota Tsuji, who challenged Sanada for his title. The day after at the event, Sanada retained his title against Tsuji. Through NJPW's partnership with All Elite Wrestling (AEW), Douki made his AEW debut on the June 23 episode of AEW Rampage, losing to "Jungle Boy" Jack Perry. Sanada made his third title defense two days later at Forbidden Door, defeating Perry. On September 24, at Destruction in Kobe, Kanemaru betrayed the stable and joined House of Torture. On October 1, Sanada revealed that a new member will be added at Destruction in Ryogoku to maintain the stable’s current name instead reverting themselves back to Just 4 Guys. On October 9, Yuya Uemura was revealed as the newest member of Just 5 Guys, teaming with Taichi and Douki to beat Sho, Yujiro Takahashi and Kanemaru.

At Wrestle Kingdom 18 Sanada lost his IWGP World Heavyweight Championship to G1 Climax 33 winner Tetsuya Naito

At Power Struggle Sanada turned on Taichi by helping David Finlay retain his IWGP Global Heavyweight Championship and left the stable to join Bullet Club's War Dogs faction, reverting the group back to Just 4 Guys.

At Dominion 6.15 in Osaka-jo Hall, Douki left the group to join House of Torture, and Taichi won the IWGP Tag Team Championship with non-J4G partner Tomohiro Ishii. At a press conference afterward, Taichi and Uemura confirmed they were moving to NJPW's main unit, thereby disbanding the group.

== Members ==
*	Founding member
I	Leader

Member		Joined	Left
Douki	*	January 5, 2023	June 15, 2025
Taichi	*	January 5, 2023	June 15, 2025
Taka Michinoku	*	January 5, 2023	June 15, 2025
Yoshinobu Kanemaru	*	January 5, 2023	September 24, 2023
Sanada	I	March 17, 2023	November 4, 2024
Yuya Uemura		October 9, 2023	June 15, 2025

== Championships and accomplishments ==
- Pro Wrestling Illustrated
  - Ranked Sanada No. 11 of the top 500 singles wrestlers in the PWI 500 in 2023
  - Ranked Taichi No. 334 of the top 500 singles wrestlers in the PWI 500 in 2023
- New Japan Pro-Wrestling
  - IWGP Heavyweight Championship (1 time) (Note: During Sanada's reign, the title was called the IWGP World Heavyweight Championship.) – Sanada
  - IWGP Intercontinental Championship (1 time) (Note: With the reactivation of the IWGP Heavyweight Championship and the restored and combined histories of both it, the World Heavyweight, and the Intercontinental titles, all former IWGP World Heavyweight Champions are retroactively recognized as having been an IWGP Intercontinental Champion.) – Sanada
  - IWGP Junior Heavyweight Championship (1 time) – Douki
  - New Japan Cup (2023) – Sanada
  - Provisional KOPW Championship (2 times) – Taichi (1), Uemura (1)
