= Hokkai Kitayell =

Sports arena in Hokkaido Prefecture, Japan

Coordinates: 43°02′40.30″N 141°22′37″E

- Kitayell

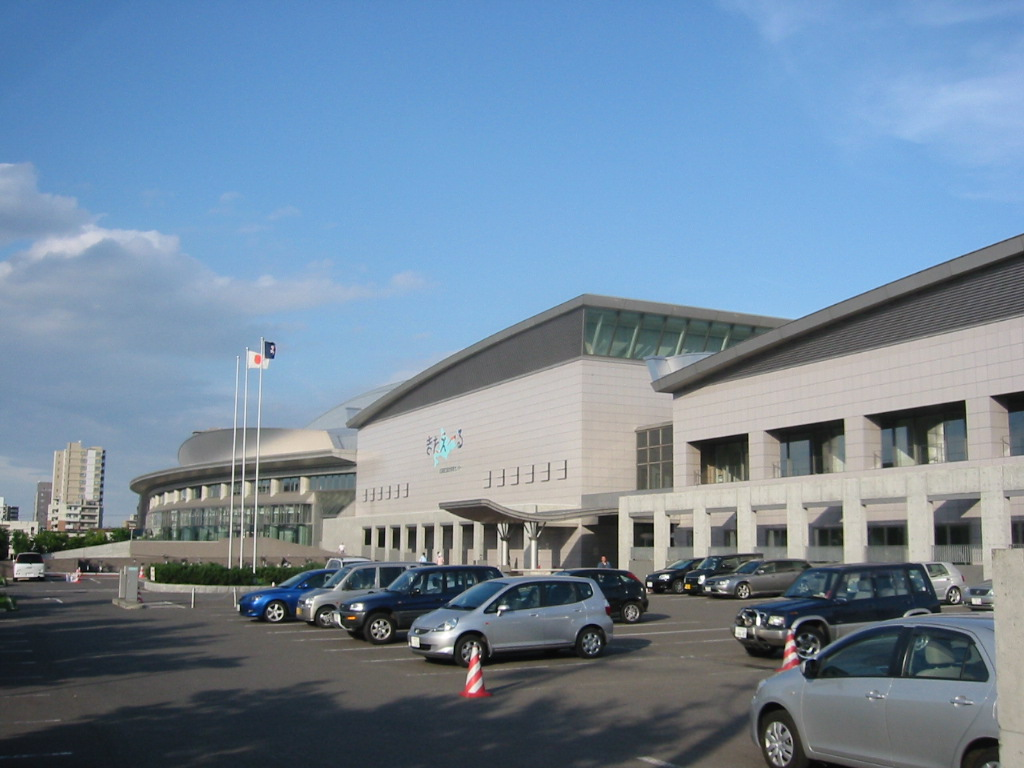

- Location within Hokkaido Location within Japan
- Interactive map of Hokkai Kitayell
- Full name: Hokkaido Prefectural Sports Center
- Location: Sapporo, Hokkaidō
- Owner: Hokkaidō Prefecture
- Capacity: 8,000
- Surface: Betulaceae
- Scoreboard: Daktronics centerhung scoreboard
- Parking: 180

Construction
- Groundbreaking: October 1996
- Opened: September 20, 1999
- Architect: Kume Sekkei

Tenants
- Levanga Hokkaido (2007–present); Espolada Hokkaido (2009–present)

Website
- http://www.kitayell.jp/

Hokkaido Prefectural Sports Center (北海道立総合体育センター, Hokkaidō-ritsu Sōgō Taiiku Sentā) is an indoor sporting arena located in Toyohira-ku, Sapporo, Japan. Sometimes called Kitayell, the capacity of the main arena is 8,000. It hosted some of the group games for the 2006 FIBA World Championship and also for the 2006 Women's Volleyball World Championship.

Kitayell also has a second arena for smaller events, and a public exercise gym with treadmills, weights, and weight machines.

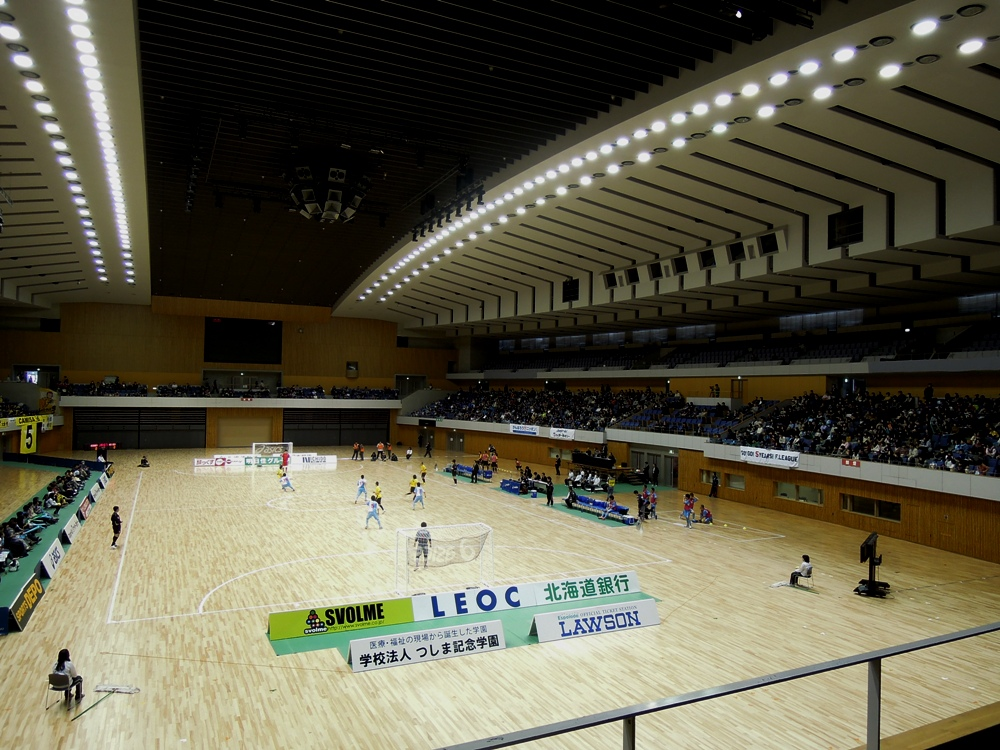
Arena

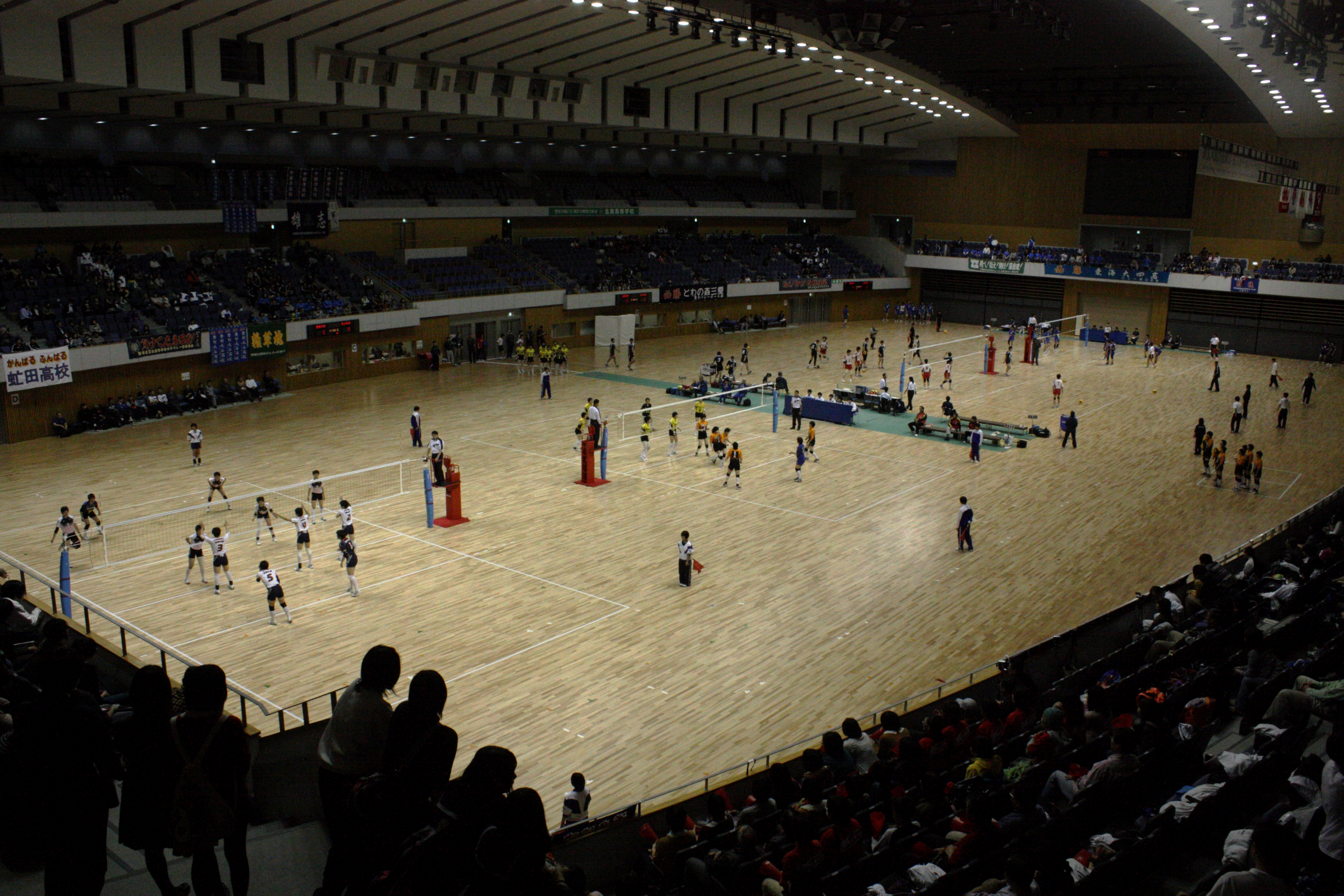

== Access ==
- Tōhō Line: Connected directly by an underground passage from Toyohira-Kōen Station.

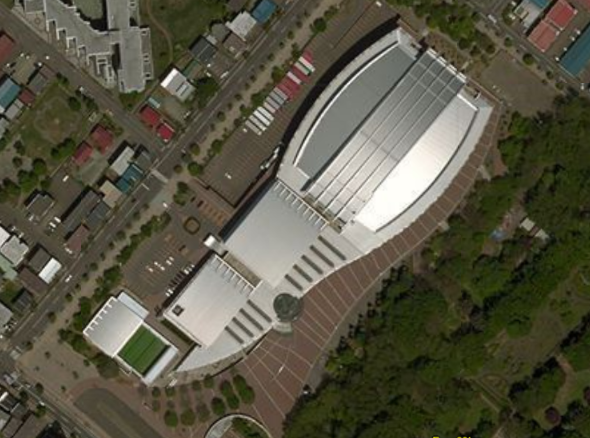
Satellite view
