= El Desperado (wrestler) =

Japanese professional and amateur wrestler (born 1983)

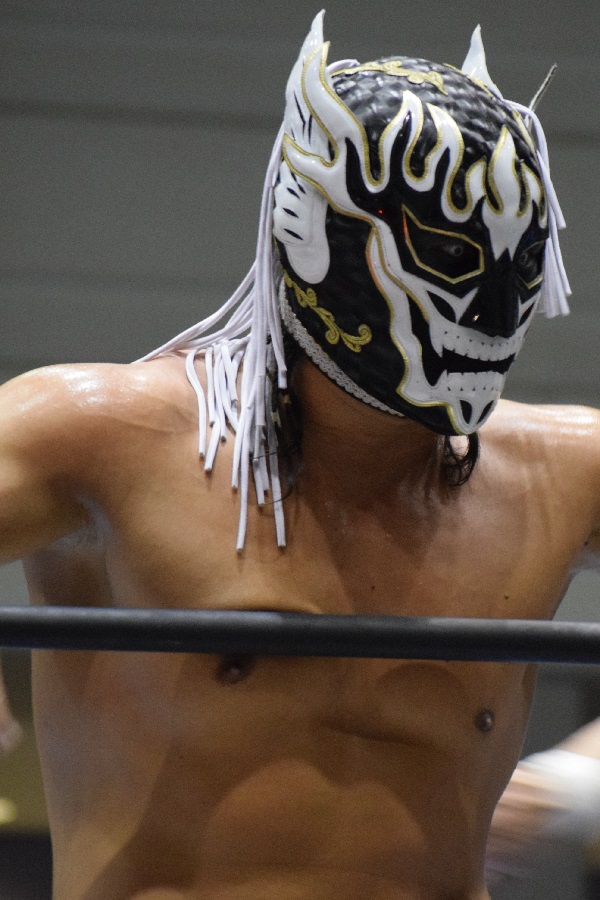
- Mikami as El Desperado in May 2017

Personal information
- Born: Kyosuke Mikami; December 29, 1983 (age 42) Nagaoka, Niigata, Japan

Professional wrestling career
- Ring name(s): El Desperado; Kyosuke Mikami; Namajague
- Billed height: 1.77 m (5 ft 9 1/2 in)
- Billed weight: 90 kg (198 lb)
- Trained by: NJPW Dojo; Koji Kanemoto; Jado
- Debut: March 7, 2010

Kyosuke Mikami (三上 恭佑, Mikami Kyōsuke; born December 29, 1983), better known by his ring name El Desperado (エル・デスペラード, Eru Desuperādo), is a Japanese luchador enmascarado (or masked professional wrestler). He is signed to New Japan Pro-Wrestling (NJPW), where he is a former five-time IWGP Junior Heavyweight Champion and a five-time IWGP Junior Heavyweight Tag Team Champion. He was a member of the Suzuki-gun stable from 2014 until its disbandment in 2022.

Mikami was trained by the NJPW dojo and worked for NJPW for two years as a Young Lion. In 2012, he traveled to Mexico for a learning excursion, working for NJPW's Mexican affiliate Consejo Mundial de Lucha Libre (CMLL) as the masked character Namajague, a Spanish translation of Namahage, a Japanese folk demon. While in CMLL, he won his first professional wrestling title alongside Okumura, the CMLL Arena Coliseo Tag Team Championship, in March 2013. After being unmasked due to losing a match and briefly working without one, Mikami returned to NJPW in January 2014 and was repackaged under another mask as El Desperado. During his time with Suzuki-gun, he is a former two-time IWGP Junior Heavyweight Champion and a four-time IWGP Junior Heavyweight Tag Team Champion (alongside Yoshinobu Kanemaru).

== Early life ==
Mikami was born and raised in Nagaoka, Niigata, Japan. He later attended Senshu University but dropped out before graduating. He pursued both a Judo and an Amateur wrestling career, both in Greco-Roman and in Freestyle wrestling.

== Professional wrestling career ==
=== New Japan Pro-Wrestling (2009–present) ===
==== Young Lion and excurison (2009–2013) ====
He attended New Japan Pro-Wrestling's (NJPW) annual open try out test in May, 2009. He passed the test and was accepted into the NJPW Dojo. Mikami trained in the same class as King Fale and Hiromu Takahashi who all made their in-ring debut around the same time.

After training in the NJPW Dojo for almost a year Mikami made his debut on March 7, 2010, losing to Ryusuke Taguchi. NJPW traditionally requires their rookies (referred to as "Young Lions" in NJPW) to wear simple, generic black trunks and boots and pay their dues by helping to set up the ring etc. while they gain in-ring experience. Mikami would lose at least 31 matches in a row, not uncommon for NJPW dojo graduates, until he was able to beat fellow dojo trainee Hiromu Takahashi in Takahashi's debut match on August 24, 2010 at NEVER.1. He competed in the 2011 "Road to the Super Junior 2Days Tournament" on April 7, but was eliminated in the first round by Ryuichi Sekine. He would later team up with fellow "Young Lions" Hiromu Takahashi & Takaaki Watanabe to compete in NJPW's "J Sports Crown Openweight 6 Man Tag Tournament". The team lost to Madoka, Shinobu and Tsuyoshi Kikuchi in their first match. Mikami's last match to date came on January 4, 2012 as he appeared in a dark match before NJPW's Wrestle Kingdom VI in Tokyo Dome show, the biggest show in NJPW. The match saw Mikami and Tomoaki Honma lose to Tama Tonga and Captain New Japan. It was later announced that Mikami was injured to take some time off, a storyline to cover for his long-term absence from NJPW.

==== Suzuki-Gun (2014–2022) ====
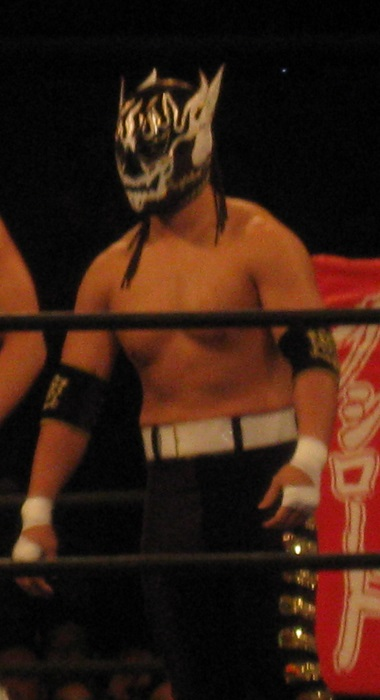
Mikami as El Desperado in March 2014.

On December 9, 2013, NJPW announced the upcoming debut of a new masked wrestler named "El Desperado". Mikami returned to his home promotion on January 4, 2014, at Wrestle Kingdom 8 in Tokyo Dome. Wearing a new white mask and a black suit and carrying a guitar case, similar to the character El Mariachi from the Mexico Trilogy films, he entered the ring after Kota Ibushi had become the new IWGP Junior Heavyweight Champion and gave him a bouquet of flowers. In storyline, El Desperado is Mexican, but has a Japanese father and can therefore speak Japanese. El Desperado made his in-ring debut the following day, teaming with Jyushin Thunder Liger in a tag team match, where they defeated Ibushi and Bushi, with him pinning Bushi for the win. The IWGP Junior Heavyweight Championship match between El Desperado and Ibushi took place on February 11 at The New Beginning in Osaka and saw Ibushi retain his title. On March 6 at New Japan's 42nd anniversary event, El Desperado started a new feud with Jyushin Thunder Liger. After a brawl following a six-man tag team match, Liger challenged El Desperado to a Mask vs. Mask match. On April 6 at Invasion Attack 2014, El Desperado teamed up with Kota Ibushi to unsuccessfully challenge The Young Bucks (Matt and Nick Jackson) for the IWGP Junior Heavyweight Tag Team Championship. From May 30 to June 6, El Desperado took part in the 2014 Best of the Super Juniors tournament, where he finished with a record of three wins and four losses, failing to advance from his block. On July 4, El Desperado turned heel and joined the Suzuki-gun stable, while also setting his sights on the IWGP Junior Heavyweight Championship. On September 23 at Destruction in Okayama, El Desperado and Suzuki-gun stablemate Taichi received a shot at the IWGP Junior Heavyweight Tag Team Championship, but were defeated by the Time Splitters (Alex Shelley and Kushida). On October 13 at King of Pro-Wrestling, El Desperado unsuccessfully challenged Ryusuke Taguchi for the IWGP Junior Heavyweight Championship. El Desperado then began chasing Jyushin Thunder Liger for the NWA World Junior Heavyweight Championship, leading to a title match between the two on January 5, 2015, where Liger retained his title.

Also in January 2015, Suzuki-gun entered a storyline, where the entire stable invaded the Pro Wrestling Noah promotion. As part of the storyline, El Desperado and Taka Michinoku won the GHC Junior Heavyweight Tag Team Championship on March 15 by defeating Choukibou-gun (Hajime Ohara and Kenoh) and No Mercy (Daisuke Harada and Genba Hirayanagi) in a three-way match. In July, El Desperado entered the 2015 Global Junior Heavyweight League. After a record of four wins and one loss, El Desperado entered the final day on August 5 with a chance to reach the finals, but a loss to Daisuke Harada meant that Harada instead advanced from the block. The following month, El Desperado and Michinoku made it to the finals of the 2015 NTV G+ Cup Junior Heavyweight Tag League, but were defeated there by Harada and Atsushi Kotoge. On October 4, El Desperado and Michinoku lost the GHC Junior Heavyweight Tag Team Championship to Harada and Kotoge. Following the loss, El Desperado was sidelined with a neck injury. After his return, El Desperado was forced to put his spot in Suzuki-gun on the line, but managed to retain his membership by defeating stablemate Takashi Iizuka by disqualification on March 17, 2016. The Suzuki-gun Noah invasion storyline concluded in December 2016, which led to the stable returning to NJPW on January 5, 2017. In May and June, El Desperado took part in the 2017 Best of the Super Juniors, where he finished last in his block with a record of three wins and four losses. Because of his win over Kushida during the tournament, El Desperado was granted a shot at the IWGP Junior Heavyweight Championship on September 16 at Destruction in Hiroshima, but was defeated by Kushida. On March 6, El Desperado and Yoshinobu Kanemaru won the IWGP Junior Heavyweight Tag Team Championship in a 3-way involving Roppongi 3K and Los Ingobernables de Japón. Desperado's first title in NJPW. In May 2018, he entered the Best of the Super Juniors tournament. He finished the tournament with 3 wins and 4 losses, failing to advance to the finals. Because of his win over eventual tournament winner and new champion Hiromu Takahashi during the tournament, El Desperado was granted a shot at the IWGP Junior Heavyweight Championship on June 18 Kizuna Road Show, but was defeated by Takahashi. From October 16 to November 1, 2018, Desperado and Kanemaru participated in the 2018 Super Junior Tag Tournament, where they topped the block with a record of five wins and two losses, advancing into the finals, but were defeated by Roppongi 3K in a triple threat match which also included Los Ingobernables de Japón (Bushi and Shingo Takagi). On January 4, 2019, at Wrestle Kingdom 13, Desperado and Kanemaru lost the IWGP Junior Heavyweight Tag Team Championship to Bushi and Takagi, in a three-way rematch which also included Roppongi 3K, ending their reign at 304 days.

In January 2019, Mikami briefly revived his Namajague character from CMLL for their cross promotional Fantastica Mania tour with NJPW. Namajague made his debut on January 11, 2019, teaming with Bárbaro Cavernario and Carístico in a six-man tag team match, where they defeated Kushida, Volador Jr and Soberano Jr.

On September 11, 2020, Desperado and Kanemaru won a tournament by beating Bushi and Hiromu Takahashi to win the IWGP Jr. Tag Team Championship once again. In November, Desperado participated in the Best of the Super Juniors tournament where he scored 14 points advancing to the finals. In the finals, he faced Hiromu Takahashi; during the match, half of his mask was ripped off by Takahashi, which led to Desperado taking off the rest and revealing his face for the first time since 2010. Desperado would go on to lose the match. While Kanemaru and Desperado lost the titles against Bullet Club (Taiji Ishimori and El Phantasmo) on January 23, they regained them one month later. On February 28 at Castle Attack, Desperado won his first major singles title when he won the vacant IWGP Junior Heavyweight Championship in a triple threat match involving Bushi and El Phantasmo, making him a double champion. The next day, NJPW announced that El Desperado will wrestle Kota Ibushi on their 49th Anniversary show on March 4, to determine the inaugural IWGP World Heavyweight Champion in a match that Desperado ultimately lost. Desperado and Kanemaru lost the IWGP Junior Heavyweight Tag Team Championships to Roppongi 3K at Sakura Genesis, ending his run as a double champion. After a scheduled title match against YOH was postponed due to a COVID outbreak in the locker room, he finally made his first successful defense of the IWGP Junior Heavyweight title at Dominion. At Wrestle Grand Slam in Tokyo Dome on July 25, El Desperado lost the IWGP Junior Heavyweight Championship to Robbie Eagles via submission, ending his reign at 147 days. After defeating Eagles at the G1 Climax, however, El Desperado would go on to win back the championship at Power Struggle on November 6. In November, Desperado entered the Best of the Super Juniors tournament, narrowly missing out on a chance to make the finals, finishing with 13 points. At Wrestle Kingdom 16 in January, Desperado defeated tournament winner Hiromu Takahashi, to retain the Junior Heavyweight title.

In February, Desperado retained the Junior Heavyweight title against Master Wato at NJPW New Years Golden Series. The Following month, despite being a junior heavyweight, Desperado entered the New Japan Cup, but was eliminated in the first round by Kazuchika Okada. In April, Desperado defeated Sho to retain the Junior Heavyweight Championship once more, at Hyper Battle. In May, Desperado lost the Junior Heavyweight Championship to Taiji Ishimori at Wrestling Dontaku, ending his reign at 176 days. Desperado attempted to rebound in the Best of the Super Juniors, where he competed in the B Block. Desperado finished top of his block, with 12 points. However, in the finals, Desperado once again lost to Hiromu Takahashi. At Dominion 6.12 in Osaka-jo Hall, Desperado and Kanemaru teamed with Suzuki-gun stablemate Zack Sabre Jr to take on NEVER Openweight 6-Man Tag Team Champions Evil, Yujiro Takahashi and Sho, for the titles, but failed to win. Desperado made a special appearance on the June 15th special Road Rager episode of Dynamite, where he and Lance Archer represented Suzuki-gun aiding the Jericho Appreciation Society, by attacking Jon Moxley, Hiroshi Tanahashi, Wheeler Yuta, Eddie Kingston and Ortiz, promoting stable leader Minoru Suzuki and the JAS teaming at Forbidden Door. At the show, Desperado and Kanemaru teamed on the Buy-in, losing to Keith Lee and Swerve Strickland. Desperado returned to the US the following month, making his NJPW Strong debut, defeating Hiromu Takahashi and Blake Christian in a three-way match. At Music City Mayhem, Desperado lost to Jon Moxley in a No Disqualification match.

In December, at the World Tag League & Best of the Super Juniors finals, Minoru Suzuki announced the disbandment of Suzuki-gun by the end of the year. The final match between the faction took place on December 23, where the team of Taichi, Sabre Jr, Kanemaru and Douki defeated Suzuki, Archer, Desperado and Michinoku. After the match, each of the Suzuki-gun members spoke about their memories as a part of the group and thanked leader Suzuki. The night ended with all members posing with the Suzuki-gun flag, only to be interrupted by former member Takashi Iizuka, causing all 9 men to pose in the ring, behind the Suzuki-gun flag.

==== Championship reigns (2023–present) ====
On January 4, 2023 at Wrestle Kingdom 17, Desperado competed in a four-way match for the IWGP Junior Heavyweight Championship against Master Wato, Hiromu Takahashi and champion Taiji Ishimori, in a losing effort after the match was won by Hiromu Takahashi. Later in the month, Desperado appeared at Night 2 of Wrestle Kingdom 17 in Yokohama Arena, defeating Pro Wrestling Noah's Yo-Hey. Following the event, Desperado continued to ally with Minoru Suzuki, eventually adding Ren Narita to the partnership, forming a trio. In February at The New Beginning in Osaka, The trio defeated House of Torture to win the Never Openweight 6 man tag-team championships. After the match Suzuki officially named the trio Strong Style.

The following day, Desperado appeared at Pro Wrestling Noah's Noah Great Voyage in Osaka, teaming with Nosawa Rongai to defeat Yo-Hey and Yasutaka Yano. Back in NJPW, Strong Style retained their titles against House of Torture in a rematch in April. Desperado appeared at Capital Collision, losing to Tomohiro Ishii. In May at Wrestling Dontaku, Strong Style lost the Never Openweight 6 man tag-team championships, to Hiroshi Tanahashi, Kazuchika Okada and Tomohiro Ishii. The following week, Desperado competed in the B block of the 2023 Best of the Super Juniors tournament. Desperado finished joint top of his block, advancing to the semi-finals. In the semi-final round, Desperado lost to Titán. After being called out by Hiromu Takahashi following Takahashi's victory over Taiji Ishimori at Power Struggle, Desperado (who had been guest commentator at the event) accepted the former's challenge for an IWGP Junior Heavyweight Championship match at Wrestle Kingdom 18. Desperado noted that he required eye surgery to correct his vision before the event, but he would be ready to compete on January 4, 2024.

At the event, Desperado defeated Takahashi to win his third IWGP Junior Heavyweight Championship. On February 23, 2024 at The New Beginning in Sapporo, Desperado to Sho, but regained it on June 16 at New Japan Soul to begin his fourth reign. On July 5, Desperado lost his title to Douki, but would regain the title for a fifth time at January 4, 2025, at Wrestle Kingdom 19, via referee stoppage after Douk injured his arm while performing a diving senton to the outside of the ring. On October 6, Desperado lost the title to Douki.

On Night 2 of Wrestling Dontaku on May 4, 2026, Desperado teamed with Místico to defeat Ichiban Sweet Boys (Robbie Eagles and Kosei Fujita) to win the IWGP Junior Heavyweight Tag Team Championship, marking Desperado's fifth reign with title. Desperado was set to team with Místico in the Super Junior Tag League, but on October 22, Desperado announced that he would be withdrawing from the tournament due to suffering from spinal canal stenosis and a hernia. He was subsequently replaced by Masatora Yasuda. On November 3 at Power Struggle, Místico announced that he and Desperado would vacate the junior tag titles due to the injuries, ending their reign at 183 days.

=== Consejo Mundial de Lucha Libre (2012–2013) ===
NJPW often sends their "Young Lions" on a learning excursion outside Japan, be it the United States, Europe or in particular Mexico, where NJPW has a working relationship with Consejo Mundial de Lucha Libre (CMLL) which has seen a series of Japanese wrestlers work for CMLL for shorter or longer periods of time. Mikami's "learning excursion" took him to Mexico in early 2012, where he was given a new name, Namajague and a mask that was inspired by the imagery of the Japanese folk demon Namahage. While Mikami had worked primarily as a face, he was given a heel or rudo character and teamed up with CMLL's resident Japanese worker Okumura. The two formed a tag team called La Fiebre Amarilla ("the Yellow Fever"). He made his debut as Namajague on February 2, 2012 teaming with Okumura and Misterioso, Jr., defeating the team of Black Warrior, El Sagrado and Sangre Azteca. The following month Mikami worked CMLL's major spring show Homenaje a Dos Leyendas where he teamed up with Misterioso, Jr. and Rey Escorpion to defeat the team of Fuego, Titán and Tritón in a Best two-out-of-three falls Six-man tag team match In September 2012 La Fiebre Amarilla unsuccessfully challenged for the CMLL Arena Coliseo Tag Team Championship as defending champions Fuego and Stuka, Jr. were victorious. Only weeks later Namajague was part of CMLL's largest annual show as they celebrated the 79th Anniversary of CMLL as he teamed up with Okumura and Taichi, a trio billed as La Ola Amarilla ("The Yellow Wave"), La Ola was defeated by three of CMLL's top tecnicos, Ángel de Oro, La Sombra and Titán.

In the months following the Anniversary show Namajague and Okumura developed a long running storyline with Stuka, Jr. and Rey Cometa that evolved into the main event of the 2013 Homenaje a Dos Leyendas show contested under Luchas de Apuestas, or "bet match" rules where Namajague and Stuka, Jr. both risked their masks and Okumura and Rey Cometa would risk their hair on the outcome of the match. On March 3, 2013, Namajague and Okumura defeated Fuego and Stuka, Jr. to win the CMLL Arena Coliseo Tag Team Championship, Mikami's first professional wrestling title. On March 15, 2013 Okumura and Namajague were defeated by Stuka, Jr. and Rey Cometa in the main event of the 2013 Homenaje a Dos Leyendas show, forcing Okumura to have all his hair shaved off and Namajague was unmasked and had to reveal his real name, Kyosuke Mikami, as per lucha libre traditions. The storyline between Namajague and Rey Cometa did not end after the unmasking, instead it switched to an individual storyline between the two, that included Namajague breaking a pane of glass over Rey Cometa's head during a one-on-one match. The conflict led to CMLL signing a one-on-one Lucha de Apuestas between with Cometa and Namajague's hair on the line, to take place on the April 26, 2013 Arena Mexico 57th Anniversary Show. Rey Cometa won the Luchas de Apuestas, two falls to one, to have all of Namajague's hair shaved off after the match. On November 3, Namajague and Okumura lost the Arena Coliseo Tag Team Championship to Delta and Guerrero Maya, Jr.

== Championships and accomplishments ==
- Consejo Mundial de Lucha Libre
  - CMLL Arena Coliseo Tag Team Championship (1 time) – with Okumura
- New Japan Pro-Wrestling
  - IWGP Junior Heavyweight Championship (5 times)
  - IWGP Junior Heavyweight Tag Team Championship (5 times) – with Yoshinobu Kanemaru (4), and Místico (1)
  - NEVER Openweight 6-Man Tag Team Championship (1 time) – with Minoru Suzuki and Ren Narita
  - Best of the Super Juniors (2024)
  - Super Junior Tag League (2021) — with Yoshinobu Kanemaru
  - Vacant IWGP Junior Heavyweight Tag Team Championship Tournament (2020) - with Yoshinobu Kanemaru
- Pro Wrestling Illustrated
  - Ranked No. 39 of the top 500 singles wrestlers in the PWI 500 in 2022 and 2025
- Pro Wrestling Noah
  - GHC Junior Heavyweight Tag Team Championship (1 time) – with Taka Michinoku

== Luchas de Apuestas record ==
Winner (wager)	Loser (wager)	Location	Event	Date	Notes
Stuka, Jr. (mask) and Rey Cometa (hair)	La Fiebre Amarilla (Okumura (hair) and Namajague (mask))	Mexico City, Mexico	2013 Homenaje a Dos Leyendas	March 15, 2013	
Rey Cometa (hair)	Namajague (hair)	Mexico City, Mexico	Arena Mexico 57th Anniversary Show	April 26, 2013	
