= Sho (wrestler) =

Japanese professional wrestler

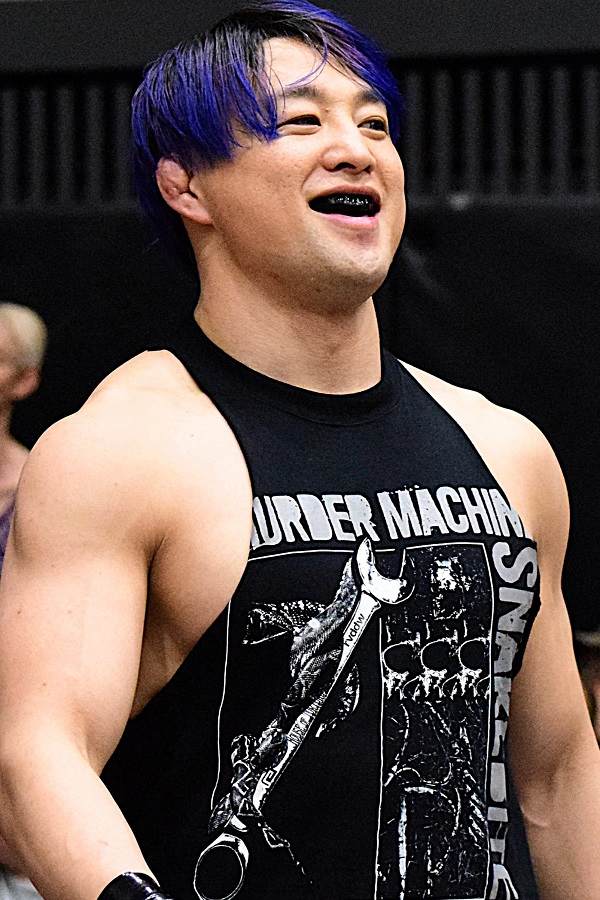
- Sho in May 2024

Personal information
- Born: Sho Tanaka; August 27, 1989 (age 37) Uwajima, Ehime, Japan
- Education: Tokuyama University
- Website: Twitter

Professional wrestling career
- Ring name(s): Raijin; Sho; Sho Tanaka
- Billed height: 173 cm (5 ft 8 in)
- Billed weight: 93 kg (205 lb)
- Trained by: NJPW Dojo; Junji Hirata; Yuji Nagata
- Debut: November 15, 2012

Sho Tanaka (田中 翔, Tanaka Shō) (born August 27, 1989), known mononymously as Sho (stylised in all caps as SHO), is a Japanese professional wrestler. He is signed to New Japan Pro-Wrestling (NJPW), where he is a member of House of Torture.

He is a former member of both Chaos and Bullet Club, and was a part of the junior heavyweight tag team Roppongi 3K, along with Yoh. The tag team were five-time IWGP Junior Heavyweight Tag Team Champions and three-time winners of the Super Junior Tag League. Additionally, Sho is a three-time NEVER Openweight 6-Man Tag Team Champion.

He has previously worked for the American promotion Ring of Honor (ROH) and Mexican promotion Consejo Mundial de Lucha Libre (CMLL). In the latter promotion, he was known under the ring name Raijin (雷神, Raijin), named after the Japanese God of thunder, and was part of La Ola Amarilla ("the Yellow Wave") alongside Okumura, Kamaitachi and Fujin (the name Yoh worked under in Mexico).

== Early life ==
Sho Tanaka was born on August 27, 1989, in Uwajima, Ehime, Japan. While in high school he became involved with Greco-Roman wrestling, something he continued to practice as he attended Tokuyama University. At Tokuyama, he was the vice-captain of the wrestling team, competing in the 7th All-Japan University Championship for Greco-Roman wrestling, where he came in third over all.

== Professional wrestling career ==
=== New Japan Pro-Wrestling (2012–present) ===
==== Young lion (2012–2016) ====
Inspired by New Japan Pro-Wrestling (NJPW) wrestler Hiroshi Tanahashi, Tanaka attended the NJPW Dojo in February 2012, training for his professional wrestling career.

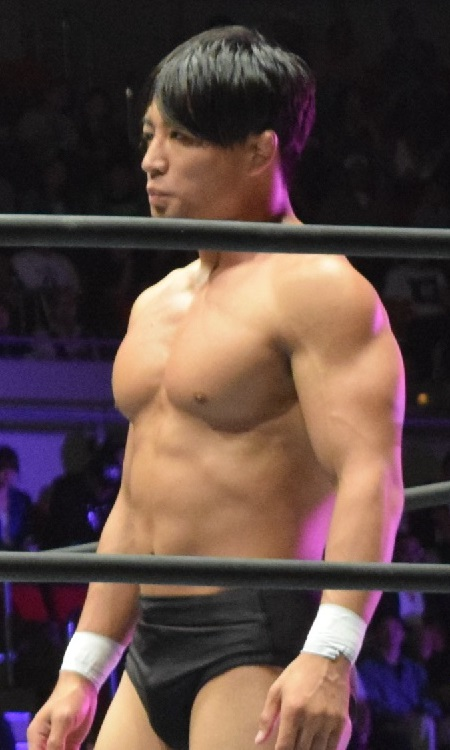
Tanaka in September 2015

On November 11, 2012, Tanaka made his professional wrestling debut in the opening match of the NEVER: Shodai NEVER Musabetsu Kyu Oza Kettei Tournament 1st round show where he lost to Takaaki Watanabe. Tanaka competed as one of NJPW's "Young Lions" a class of rookie wrestlers who work mostly against each other early on, wearing all black gear and with no particular ring character, all part of the structured learning process in NJPW. Throughout 2013 and 2014, Tanaka often faced off against fellow Young Lion Yohei Komatsu, with both men trading victories in both singles and tag team competition. By 2015, Tanaka and Komatsu had begun teaming together on a regular basis, including working together in the New Japan Rumble as part of Wrestle Kingdom 9 on January 5, 2015. The two teamed up to eliminate Tiger Mask and Taichi but were both eliminated by Tama Tonga. Tanaka was called upon to replace an injured Rey Cometa on a NJPW/Consejo Mundial de Lucha Libre co-promoted Fantastica Mania 2015 show on January 14. Tanaka and Stigma lost to La Peste Negra ("The Black Plague"; Bárbaro Cavernario and Mr. Niebla) On February 11, 2015, Tanaka defeated rival and occasional tag team partner Yohei Komatsu in the opening match of NJPW's 2015 The New Beginning in Osaka show. In June and July 2015, Tanaka represented NJPW in Pro Wrestling Noah's Global Junior Heavyweight League. During the tournament, he earned two points by defeating Hitoshi Kumano, but lost the rest of his matches to be eliminated from the tournament. At Destruction in Kobe, Tanaka and Komatsu defeated fellow Young Lions David Finlay and Jay White.

In early 2016, it was announced that Tanaka and Komatsu would compete in the 2016 Fantastica Mania series of shows, competing in what NJPW called the "Yohei Komatsu and Sho Tanaka send-off game", announcing that the two would travel to Mexico and work for CMLL as part of their continued in-ring skill development. The team worked the opening match for each of the six Fantastica Mania events, losing each time.

==== Roppongi 3K (2017–2021) ====
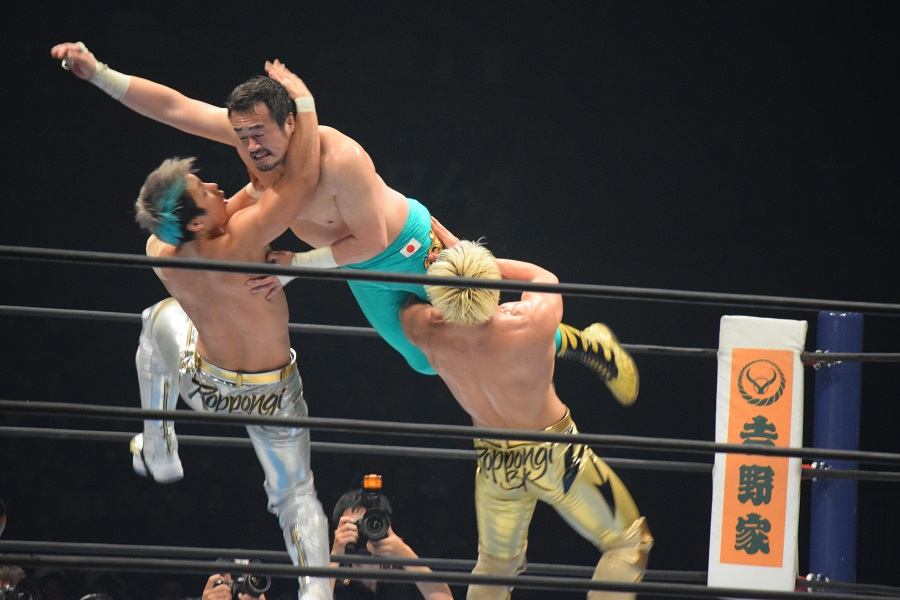
Roppongi 3K performing the 3K on Ryusuke Taguchi

On October 9, 2017, at King of Pro-Wrestling, Tanaka and Komatsu, billed as "Sho" and "Yoh", returned to NJPW, when they were revealed as Rocky Romero's new tag team Roppongi 3K. The two defeated Funky Future (Ricochet and Ryusuke Taguchi) in their return match to become the new IWGP Junior Heavyweight Tag Team Champions. Through their affiliation with Romero, Sho and Yoh also became part of the Chaos stable. On November 5 at Power Struggle, Roppongi 3K defeated Super 69 (ACH and Ryusuke Taguchi) in the finals to win the 2017 Super Jr. Tag Tournament. On January 4, 2018, Roppongi 3K lost the Junior Heavyweight Tag Team Championship to The Young Bucks (Matt Jackson and Nick Jackson) at Wrestle Kingdom 12, but won it back on January 28 at the New Beginning in Sapporo. Roppongi 3K lost the Junior Heavyweight Tag Team Championship to Suzuki-gun (El Desperado and Yoshinobu Kanemaru) at the NJPW 46th Anniversary Event in March 2018. In May 2018, he entered the Best of the Super Juniors tournament. He finished the tournament with three wins and four losses, failing to advance to the finals. In October, Sho and Yoh entered the 2018 Super Junior Tag League, winning the tournament for the second time in a row to face Desperado and Kanemaru at Wrestle Kingdom 13. However, an earlier loss to the team of Shingo Takagi and Bushi made the title match a triple threat, that Takagi and Bushi would go onto win, with Takagi pinning Sho. At New Japan's 47th Anniversary Event, Sho and Yoh would defeat Takagi and Bushi to win the Junior Heavyweight Tag Team Championship for a third time. Sho would then start to call out Takagi for a singles match, even hoping to face Takagi in the Best of the Super Juniors finals. Takagi and Sho would meet on the first night of the tournament with Takagi defeating Sho. In June, Roppongi 3K would lose the Junior Tag Team Championship to Bullet Club (El Phantasmo and Taiji Ishimori). In November, Sho and Yoh would win the Super Junior Tag League for the third time in a row. At Wrestle Kingdom 14, Roppongi 3K would defeat Phantasmo and Ishimori to win the titles for a fourth time. Roppongi 3K would make their first successful title defense against Desperado and Kanemaru at The New Beginning in Osaka. They would make their second successful title defense against Rocky Romero and Ryusuke Taguchi on the first night of the New Japan Road tour. Following New Japan's return to producing wrestling shows, Sho entered the 2020 New Japan Cup avenging his loss to Takagi in the first round before losing to Sanada in the second. Sho challenged for his first singles title, the NEVER Openweight Championship, in a defeat to Takagi at Dominion. Unfortunately during that time, Roppongi 3K was forced to relinquish the Junior Heavyweight Tag Championship due to Yoh suffering a knee injury against Bushi during the New Japan Cup. In November 2020, he entered the Best of the Super Juniors tournament. He finished the tournament with 6 wins and 3 losses, failing to advance to the finals.

In 2021, Sho challenged for the IWGP Junior Heavyweight Championship for the first time in his career, but failed to capture the title from Hiromu Takahashi in the main event of The New Beginning. Yoh made his return from injury at Sakura Genesis, reuniting Roppongi 3K. The team would then capture the Junior Heavyweight Tag Team Championship for the fifth time, defeating Desperado and Kanemaru. On June 23 at Kizuna Road, 3K would lose their titles to El Phantasmo and Ishimori.

In the following months 3K would hit a major slump after losing their Junior Heavyweight Tag Team Championship with both members having no clear direction or feuds, and with the team taking numerous losses in multi man tag matches. In late July, Yoh, who had also started sporting a more toned down look and demeanor, began to undergo a large losing streak, taking the pins in three straight matches prior to Super Jr. Tag League beginning, which left Sho seemingly worried for him and the team's future. Roppongi 3K entered the tournament, but lost their first three straight matches, immediately being eliminated from the tournament they had never failed to win in any year prior, with Yoh once again taking the falls each time out. On August 16, Roppongi 3K would lose their fourth tournament match to Desperado and Kanemaru, after Sho chose to not help Yoh escape a submission hold from Desperado. After the match Sho would attack Yoh and claim that he was now useless to him, disbanding their team after eight years, and turning heel.

==== House of Torture (2021–present) ====
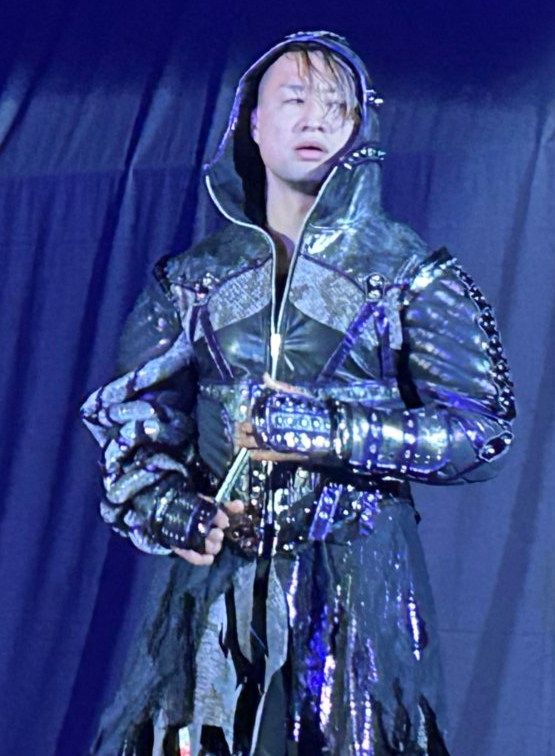
Sho in February 2023

On September 4, 2021, he defeated his former tag team partner Yoh by referee stoppage on Night 1 of Wrestle Grand Slam in MetLife Dome. After the match, Sho joined Bullet Club, by accepting the shirt given to him by Evil. Alongside Evil, Yujiro Takahashi and Dick Togo, Sho joined the sub-group House of Torture. At Power Struggle, Sho, Takahashi and Evil defeated Sho's former Chaos stablemates Hirooki Goto, Yoshi-Hashi and Tomohiro Ishii, to win the NEVER Openweight 6-Man Tag Team Championship. The following week, Sho entered the Best of the Super Juniors tournament. Sho's tournament campaign ended with a total of 12 points, with a loss to Yoh on the final night, preventing him from reaching the finals. On January 5 at Night 2 of Wrestle Kingdom 16, House of Torture defeated Chaos in a rematch for the Openweight 6-Man Tag Team Championship. The following night, Sho defeated Pro Wrestling Noah's Atsushi Kotoge.

In February at NJPW Golden Series, House of Torture retained their titles against Chaos. The following month, Sho entered the New Japan Cup, but was defeated by Hiromu Takahashi in the first round. In April at Hyper Battle, Sho challenged El Desperado for the IWGP Junior Heavyweight Championship, but was defeated. Later that month, House of Torture successfully defended their Openweight 6-Man Tag Team Championship against Guerillas of Destiny (Tama Tonga and Tanga Loa) and Hiroshi Tanahashi. The following month, Sho competed in the Best of the Super Juniors, competing in the A Block. Sho finished the tournament with 10 points, failing to advance to the finals. The following month at Dominion 6.12 in Osaka-jo Hall, House of Torture defeated Suzuki-gun (El Desperado, Yoshinobu Kanemaru and Zack Sabre Jr.) to retain their Openweight 6-Man Tag Team Championship once again. In July, the trio lost the Openweight 6-Man Tag Team Championship to Chaos (Hirooki Goto, Yoshi-Hashi and Yoh), ending their reign at 241 days.

In September at Burning Spirit, House of Torture regained the Openweight 6-Man Tag Team Championship. In November, Sho and Dick Togo entered the Super Junior Tag League, but failed to advance to the finals after finishing with 4 points. On January 4 at Wrestle Kingdom 17, Sho competed in the New Japan Rambo, where he lasted until the final four, and earnt a spot in the four-way match for the 2023 provisional KOPW Championship at New Year Dash!! the following day. At the event, Sho failed to win the match, which was won by Shingo Takagi.

At The New Beginning in Osaka, House of Torture lost the Openweight 6-Man Tag Team Championship to Minoru Suzuki, Ren Narita and El Desperado. The trio failed to regain their titles in a rematch in April. In May, Sho entered the Best of the Super Juniors, competing in the A Block. Sho ended the tournament with 8 points, failing to advance to the semi-finals. In August, House of Torture embarked on a feud with Just 5 Guys. After a match between the two sides, on August 13, after Sho scored a direct pinfall victory over provisional KOPW Champion Taichi in an eight-man tag team match, Sho proceeded to attack him with the title belt, before declaring that he would take it from its rightful holder, setting up a title match at Destruction. At the event, he defeated Taichi in a seconds handcuffed match, with help from Kanemaru (who turned on Just 5 Guys), to become the new provisional KOPW Champion. At New Japan Road, in a match guest refereed by Kanemaru, Sho dropped the provisional title back to Taichi, and as a result of the stipulation, was banned from wrestling in the Yamagata Prefecture.

On February 23, 2024 at The New Beginning in Sapporo, Sho defeated El Desperado to win the IWGP Junior Heavyweight Championship for the first time. He lost the title back to Desperado on June 16 at New Japan Soul, ending his reign at 114 days.

On May 3, 2025 at Wrestling Dontaku: Night 1, House of Torture were defeated by Bullet Club War Dogs in a Dog Pound match. Per the added stipulaation, House of Torture were forced to leave Bullet Club. On June 15, Sho and Douki defeated Master Wato and Yoh to win the IWGP Junior Heavyweight Tag Team Championship. The duo also won the 2025 Super Junior Tag League, defeating Robbie X and Taiji Ishimori in the final on November 2. They lost the tag team championship to Robbie Eagles and Kosei Fujita on January 5, 2026, at New Year Dash!!. On November 4 at Power Struggle, Sho attempted to attack Yoh who was the reigining IWGP Junior Heavyweight Champion but was thwarted. Yoh then granted Sho a title shot at Wrestle Kingdom 21 on the condition that if he were to lose, he would leave House of Torture and reform Roppongi 3K.

=== Overseas promotions (2016–2017) ===
Tanaka and Komatsu became be the latest in a long line of young Japanese wrestlers to travel to Mexico to learn the lucha libre style. In Mexico, Tanaka was given the ring name Raijin, named after the Japanese God of Thunder, teaming with Komatsu who would be known as Fujin, named after the Japanese God of Wind. The duo made their Mexican debut on January 31, 2016, teaming up with Okumura, forming the most recent version of La Ola Amarilla ("The Yellow Wave"). The group was joined by Kamaitachi, a previous NJPW trainee who had worked for CMLL since 2014.

In October 2016, Tanaka and Komatsu, now billed as "Sho" and "Yohey" and known as "The Tempura Boyz", began working regularly for American promotion Ring of Honor (ROH), with whom NJPW also had a working relationship.

== Mixed martial arts career ==
Tanaka was scheduled to make his mixed martial arts debut on May 27, 2017, fighting Nicholas Trochez in Queens, New York, for Golden MMA Championships. Trochez first failed to make weight for the fight, which Tanaka was reportedly willing to overlook, but the fight ended up being canceled when Trochez's medical information also did not come in on time.

== Championships and accomplishments ==
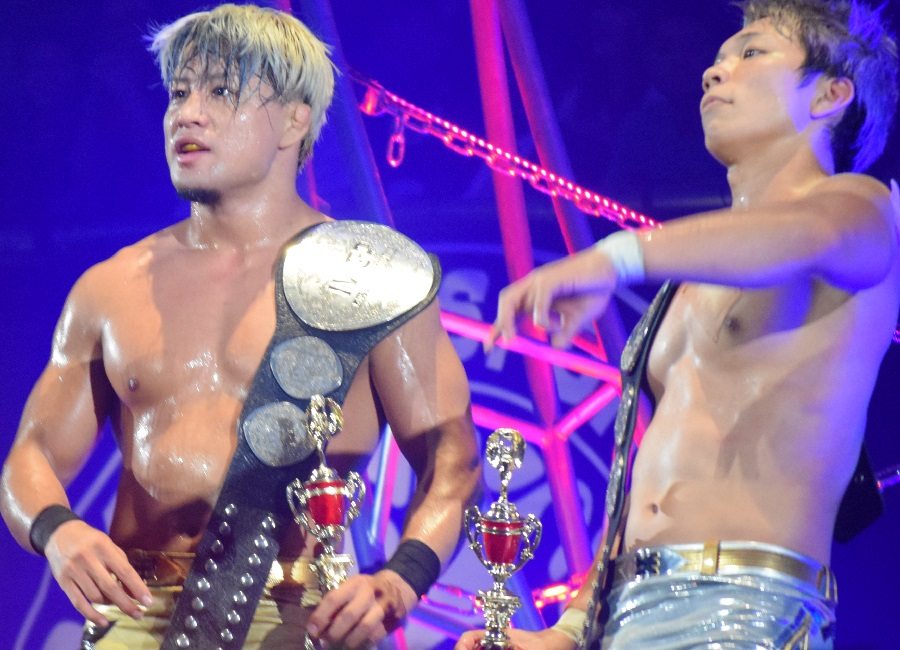
Roppongi 3K as the IWGP Junior Heavyweight Tag Team Champions and the winners of the 2017 Super Jr. Tag Tournament

- New Japan Pro-Wrestling
  - IWGP Junior Heavyweight Championship (1 time)
  - IWGP Junior Heavyweight Tag Team Championship (6 times) – with Yoh (5) and Douki (1)
  - NEVER Openweight 6-Man Tag Team Championship (3 times) – with Evil and Yujiro Takahashi (2) and Ren Narita and Yujiro Takahashi (1)
  - KOPW Provisional Championship (1 time)
  - Super Jr. Tag Tournament/Super Junior Tag League (2017, 2018, 2019) – with Yoh
  - Super Jr. Tag League (2025) – with Douki
  - Concurso (2019)
- Pro Wrestling Illustrated
  - Ranked No. 163 of the top 500 singles wrestlers in the PWI 500 in 2018
  - Ranked No. 10 of the top 50 tag teams in the PWI Tag Team 50 in 2020 with Yoh
