= Ren Narita =

Japanese professional wrestler (born 1997)

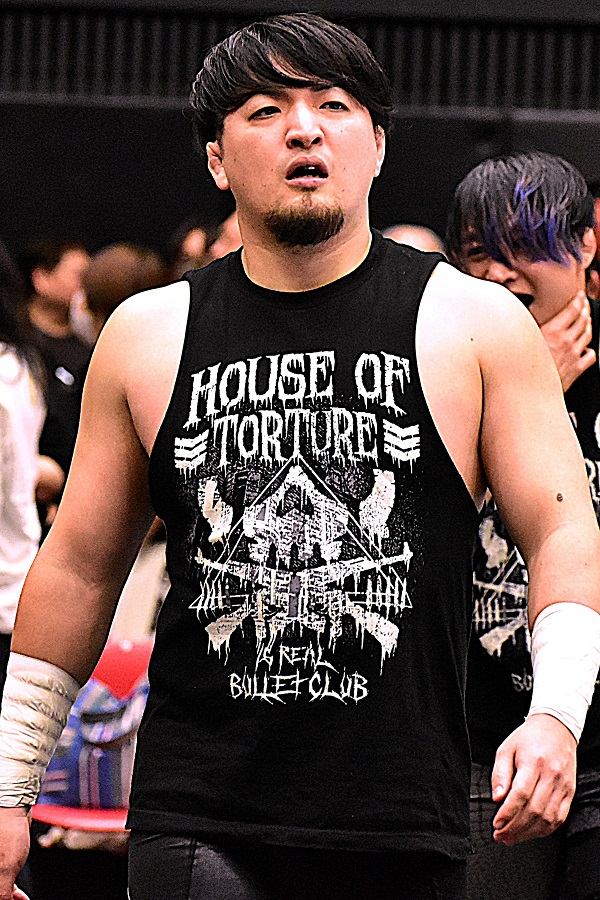
- Narita in April 2025

Personal information
- Born: November 29, 1997 (age 28) Aomori, Japan

Professional wrestling career
- Ring name: Ren Narita
- Billed height: 183 cm (6 ft 0 in)
- Billed weight: 100 kg (220 lb)
- Billed from: Aomori, Japan
- Trained by: Minoru Suzuki; NJPW Dojo; NJPW L.A. Dojo; Katsuyori Shibata
- Debut: July 4, 2017

Ren Narita (成田 蓮 Narita Ren, born November 29, 1997) is a Japanese professional wrestler. He is signed to New Japan Pro-Wrestling (NJPW), where he is the leader of House of Torture and is a former one-time NEVER Openweight Champion He is also a former two-time NEVER Openweight 6-Man Tag Team Champion and a one-time NJPW World Television Champion.

== Early life ==
Narita has played several sports before becoming a wrestler, including baseball, and kendo.

== Professional wrestling career ==
=== New Japan Pro Wrestling (2017–present) ===
==== Young Lion (2017–2019) ====
Narita was trained under New Japan Pro-Wrestling's (NJPW) "young lion" system. Narita made his professional wrestling debut for NJPW's developmental territory Lion's Gate Project, where he wrestled Shota Umino to a ten minute time limit draw at the Lion's Gate Project 7 event on July 4, 2017. Later that month, Narita had his second match, teaming with Umino where they lost to Suzuki-gun (El Desperado and Zack Sabre Jr.) on day eight of the 2017 G1 Climax tournament.

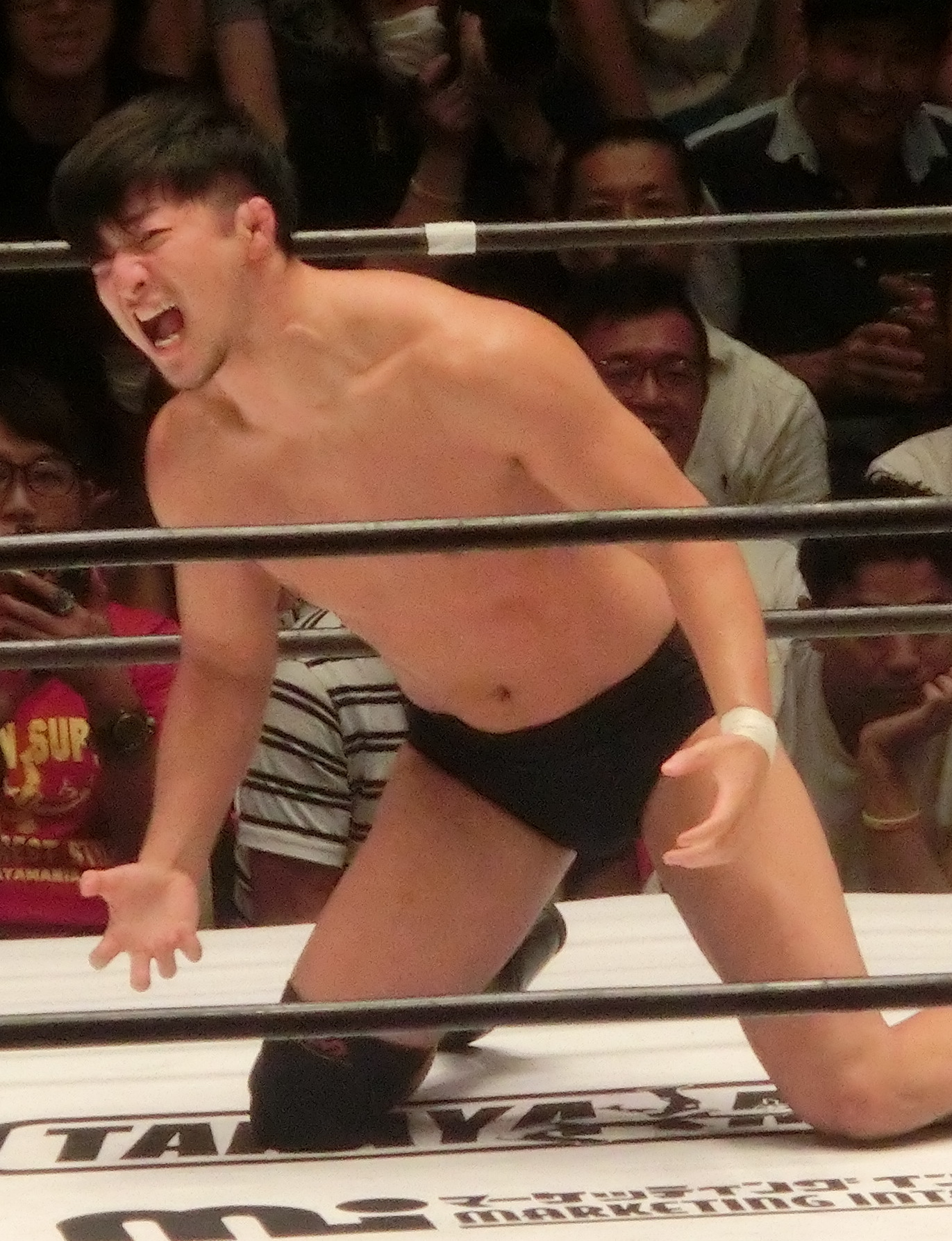
Narita in 2018

Narita competed in the 11th Young Lion Cup, gaining 1 point after a time limit draw against Tetsuhiro Yagi. During the following year, Narita wrestled several tag team matches with NJPW veterans. In May 2019, after Flip Gordon pulled out of the Best of the Super Juniors 26 tournament, Narita was announced as a last minute replacement. He ended the tournament with a final standing of 0 points. Throughout the Destruction tour in September, Narita took part in the 12th Young Lion Cup. He finished with a record of 5–2. Afterwards, it was announced that he was heading to America for his excursion and joining the L.A. Dojo.

==== Excursion to United States (2019–2022) ====
Narita wrestled his first match in the United States at Fighting Spirit Unleashed Boston, losing to Lance Archer. Narita earned his first win in the states, defeating fellow L.A. Dojo teammate Alex Coughlin, in November at NJPW Showdown in San Jose. In March 2020, New Japan suspended all of its activities, due to the COVID-19 pandemic, causing American-based talent to not be able to travel to compete. Therefore, Narita appeared primarily on New Japan's new American-based show NJPW Strong. In March 2021, Narita competed in the New Japan Cup USA tournament, defeating Misterioso in the qualifying round. In the first round, Narita lost to eventual winner, Tom Lawlor. In July, Narita teamed with Yuji Nagata to compete in the Tag Team Turbulence tournament, where they defeated Fred Yehi and Wheeler Yuta, in the first round. In the second round, the duo lost to eventual winners, the Good Brothers. In September, at Autumn Attack, Narita challenged Tom Lawlor for the Strong Openweight Championship, in a losing effort. In November at Battle in the Valley, Narita lost to Will Ospreay. After L.A. Dojo head coach Katsuyori Shibata returned from injury on the finals of the G1 Climax 31, he announced he would compete in a match at Wrestle Kingdom 16 against a mystery opponent. At said event on January 4, 2022, Shibata's opponent was revealed to be Narita, who Shibata defeated. Narita returned to compete on NJPW Strong until September, defeating Juice Robinson in his final match.

==== "Son of Strong Style" (2022–2023) ====
Narita returned from his excursion, in October at Declaration of Power, teaming with Robbie Eagles and David Finlay, to defeat Suzuki-gun. Later in the month, Narita competed in a 16-man tournament, to crown the inaugural NJPW World Television Champion, in the first round Narita achieved a shock victory over Tomohiro Ishii. He then went on to defeat established heavyweight wrestlers, such as Toru Yano and Sanada, thus advancing to the finals at Wrestle Kingdom 17, where he would face Zack Sabre Jr. At Wrestle Kingdom, Narita was defeated in the tournament final by Sabre.

After Wrestle Kingdom, Narita joined Minoru Suzuki and El Desperado, to win the NEVER Openweight 6-Man Tag Team Championships, which were held by House of Torture. The trio, now named Strong Style, lost the title on May 3, to Kazuchika Okada, Hiroshi Tanahashi and Tomohiro Ishii, ending the reign at 81 days. In July, Narita made his debut in the annual G1 Climax tournament, where he would participate in the A Block. Narita finished his tournament with 6 points, failing to advance to the quarterfinal round.

==== House of Torture (2023–present) ====
On December 6, Narita attacked his partner in the World Tag League Shota Umino and joined House of Torture, turning heel.

On January 4, 2024, at Wrestle Kingdom 18, Narita teamed with fellow House of Torture member Evil, to defeat Umino and Kaito Kiyomiya. Narita would participate in the 2024 New Japan Cup, where he would defeat Taichi and Zack Sabre Jr., only to be eliminated by Yota Tsuji in the quarter-final. At Windy City Riot, Narita defeated Minoru Suzuki and appeared later in the show, attacking newly crowned IWGP World Heavyweight Champion Jon Moxley, only to be chased off by Umino. On night two of Wrestling Dontaku, Narita unsuccessfully challenged Moxley for the championship. At King Of Pro-Wrestling, Narita defeated Jeff Cobb and Yota Tsuji in a three way match to win the NJPW World Television Champion. At Wrestle Kingdom 19, Narita lost the title to El Phantasmo in a four-way match, involving Cobb and Ryohei Oiwa. On January 30, 2025, Narita teamed with Sho and Yujiro Takahashi to defeat Hiroshi Tanahashi, Toru Yano and Oleg Boltin to win the NEVER Openweight 6-Man Tag Team Championships for the second time in his career.

On night one of Wrestling Dontaku, House of Torture were defeated by the Bullet Club War Dogs in a Dog Pound match. Per the stipulation, House of Torture were forced to leave Bullet Club.

On January 26, 2026, after NJPW announced that EVIL had left the promotion, Narita took over the leadership of House of Torture. On February 11 at The New Beginning in Osaka, Narita defeated Aaron Wolf to win the NEVER Openweight Championship. On June 14 at Dominion 6.14 in Osaka-jo Hall, Narita lost the NEVER Openweight Championship back to Wolf.

=== All Elite Wrestling (2021) ===
Narita appeared on the May 12, 2021, episode of Dynamite, where he accompanied Yuji Nagata for his IWGP United States Heavyweight Championship match against AEW World Champion Jon Moxley. On the May 24 episode of Dark: Elevation, as part of the partnership between New Japan Pro Wrestling and All Elite Wrestling (AEW), Narita made his in-ring debut for the promotion defeating Royce Isaacs.

== Championships and accomplishments ==
- New Japan Pro-Wrestling
  - NJPW World Television Championship (1 time)
  - NEVER Openweight Championship (1 time)
  - NEVER Openweight 6-Man Tag Team Championship (2 times) – with El Desperado and Minoru Suzuki (1) and Sho and Yujiro Takahashi (1)
- Pro Wrestling Illustrated
  - Ranked No. 83 of the top 500 singles wrestlers in the PWI 500 in 2026
