= The New Beginning in Nagoya (2024) =

2024 professional wrestling event

- Promotion: New Japan Pro-Wrestling
- Date: January 20, 2024
- City: Nagoya, Japan
- Venue: Aichi Prefectural Gymnasium (Dolphins Arena)
- Attendance: 2,710

Event chronology
← Previous; Battle in the Valley	Next → Road to The New Beginning

The New Beginning chronology
← Previous; Osaka (2023)	Next → Osaka (2024)

The New Beginning in Nagoya was a professional wrestling event promoted by New Japan Pro-Wrestling (NJPW). The event took place on January 20, 2024 in Nagoya, Aichi at the Aichi Prefectural Gymnasium (Dolphins Arena). This was the thirty-eight event promoted under the NJPW The New Beginning name and the third to be held in Nagoya.

Ten matches were contested at the event, including one on the pre-show. In the main event, Evil defeated Tama Tonga in a Lumberjack match to win his third NEVER Openweight Championship. In other prominent matches, TMDK (Mikey Nicholls, Shane Haste, Kosei Fujita and Zack Sabre Jr.) defeated Togi Makabe, Kazuchika Okada and Chaos (Tomohiro Ishii and Hiroshi Tanahashi), and Bullet Club War Dogs (Alex Coughlin, Gabe Kidd, Clark Connors, Drilla Moloney and David Finlay) defeated United Empire (Callum Newman, Jeff Cobb, Henare and Catch 2/2 (Francesco Akira and TJP)).

== Production ==
=== Storylines ===
The New Beginning in Osaka featured professional wrestling matches that involve different wrestlers from pre-existing scripted feuds and storylines. Wrestlers portray villains, heroes, or less distinguishable characters in scripted events that build tension and culminate in a wrestling match or series of matches.

== Results ==
No.	Results	Stipulations	Times
1^{P}	Shoma Kato vs. Katsuya Murashima ended in a time limit draw	Singles match	10:00
2	House of Torture (Ren Narita and Yujiro Takahashi) defeated Tomoaki Honma and Shota Umino by pinfall	Tag team match	9:47
3	Bullet Club War Dogs (Alex Coughlin, Gabe Kidd, Drilla Moloney, Clark Connors and David Finlay) defeated United Empire (Callum Newman, Francesco Akira, TJP, Henare, and Jeff Cobb) by pinfall	Ten-man tag team match	11:53
4	House of Torture (Yoshinobu Kanemaru and Sho) defeated Master Wato and El Desperado by pinfall	Tag team match	8:22
5	TMDK (Mikey Nicholls, Shane Haste, Kosei Fujita and Zack Sabre Jr.) defeated Togi Makabe, Hiroshi Tanahashi and Chaos (Kazuchika Okada and Tomohiro Ishii) by submission	Eight-man tag team match	10:41
6	Just 5 Guys (Taichi, Taka Michinoku, Douki, Yuya Uemura and Sanada) defeated Los Ingobernables de Japon (Bushi, Shingo Takagi, Yota Tsuji, Hiromu Takahashi and Tetsuya Naito) by pinfall	Ten-man tag team match	9:01
7	Great-O-Khan defeated Taiji Ishimori (c)	Ten Minute Ishimori Ring Fit match for the Provisional KOPW 2024 Championship	10:00
8	Guerrillas of Destiny (Hikuleo and El Phantasmo) (c) defeated Bullet Club (Chase Owens and Kenta) by pinfall	Tag team match for the Strong Openweight Tag Team Championship	21:33
9	Tama Tonga (c) vs. Evil ended in a no contest	Singles match for the NEVER Openweight Championship	2:34
10	Evil defeated Tama Tonga (c) by pinfall	Lumberjack match for the NEVER Openweight Championship	18:01
(c) / – the champion(s) heading into the match; P / – the match was broadcast on the pre-show
