= Dominion 6.9 in Osaka-jo Hall (2024) =

2024 New Japan Pro-Wrestling event

- Official artwork of the event featuring El Desperado, Taiji Ishimori, Jon Moxley and Evil
- Promotion: New Japan Pro-Wrestling
- Date: June 9, 2024
- City: Osaka, Japan
- Venue: Osaka-jō Hall
- Attendance: 7,254

Event chronology
← Previous; Best of the Super Jr. 31; Resurgence	Next → All Together: Sapporo

Dominion chronology
← Previous; 6.4	Next → 6.15

Dominion 6.9 in Osaka-jo Hall was a professional wrestling event promoted by New Japan Pro-Wrestling (NJPW). The event took place on June 9, 2024, in Osaka, Osaka at the Osaka-jō Hall. It was the 16th event under the Dominion name and tenth in a row to take place at the Osaka-jō Hall.

Nine matches were contested at the event. In the event's final match, which was promoted as part of a double main event, El Desperado defeated Taiji Ishimori in the finals of the Best of the Super Juniors 31 tournament. In the second main event, which was the penultimate match, Jon Moxley defeated Evil in a Lumberjack match to retain the IWGP World Heavyweight Championship. In other prominent matches, TMDK (Mikey Nicholls and Shane Haste) defeated Bishamon (Hirooki Goto and Yoshi-Hashi), Bullet Club (Kenta and Chase Owens) (IWGP) and Guerrillas of Destiny (Hikuleo and El Phantasmo) (Strong) in a four-way elimination Winners Take All match for both the IWGP Tag Team Championship and Strong Openweight Tag Team Championship (this was also Hikuleo's final NJPW match), and Jeff Cobb defeated Tomohiro Ishii to retain the NJPW World Television Championship.

== Production ==
=== Storylines ===
Dominion 6.9 in Osaka-jo Hall featured professional wrestling matches that involved different wrestlers from pre-existing scripted feuds and storylines. Wrestlers portrayed villains, heroes, or less distinguishable characters in the scripted events that built tension and culminated in a wrestling match or series of matches.

=== Event ===
The event started with the singles confrontation between Callum Newman and Tetsuya Naito solded with the victory of the latter. In the second bout, Zack Sabre Jr., Robbie Eagles and Kosei Fujita picked up a victory over LJ Cleary and IWGP Junior Heavyweight Tag Team Champions Clark Connors and Drilla Moloney in six-man tag team competition ahead of the title match between the WarDogs champion team and Eagles and Fujita. Next up, Great-O-Khan defeated Yuya Uemura to win the provisional KOPW Championship. The fourth bout saw Yota Tsuji, Bushi and Hiromu Takahashi defeating Hiroshi Tanahashi, Toru Yano and Oleg Boltin to win the NEVER Openweight 6-Man Tag Team Championship, ending the latter team's reign at 56 days and one successful defense. Next up, Mikey Nicholls and Shane Haste defeated the teams of Kenta and Chase Owens, El Phantasmo and Hikuleo, and Hirooki Goto and Yoshi-Hashi to win both the IWGP Tag Team Championship and Strong Openweight Tag Team Championship as a result of a Four-way tornado tag team elimination Winners Take All match. In the seventh bout, Shingo Takagi wrestled Henare into a double knockout for the NEVER Openweight Championship, rendering Takagi as retainer of the title.

In the first main event, Jon Moxley defeated Evil in a Lumberjack match to secure the fourth consecutive defense of the IWGP World Heavyweight Championship. Moxley chose Shota Umino, Tiger Mask, Yuji Nagata, Togi Makabe and Hiroyoshi Tenzan as his lumberjack enforcers for the match, while Evil chose House of Torture stablemates Ren Narita, Yoshinobu Kanemaru, Yujiro Takahashi and Dick Togo. After the bout concluded, Moxley laid an open challenge for the championship which was answered by previous champion Tetsuya Naito, as they set their confrontation for Forbidden Door on June 30, 2024. In the second main event, El Desperado defeated Taiji Ishimori in the Best of the Super Jr. 31 tournament finals. Desperado then challenged reigning IWGP Junior Heavyweight Champion Sho.

== Results ==
No.	Results	Stipulations	Times
1	Tetsuya Naito defeated Callum Newman by pinfall	Singles match	8:08
2	TMDK (Zack Sabre Jr. and Ichiban Sweet Boys (Robbie Eagles and Kosei Fujita) defeated Bullet Club War Dogs (Clark Connors and Drilla Moloney) and LJ Cleary by pinfall	Six-man tag team match	9:41
3	Great-O-Khan defeated Yuya Uemura (c) by pinfall	Storm Catch Rules match for the KOPW Championship; The rules were that there was only usage of two rope breaks, and a 15-minute time limit.	10:36
4	Los Ingobernables de Japón (Yota Tsuji, Bushi and Hiromu Takahashi) defeated Hiroshi Tanahashi, Toru Yano and Boltin Oleg (c) by pinfall	Six-man tag team match for the NEVER Openweight 6-Man Tag Team Championship	8:32
5	Jeff Cobb (c) defeated Tomohiro Ishii by pinfall	Singles match for the NJPW World Television Championship	11:47
6	TMDK (Mikey Nicholls and Shane Haste) defeated Guerrillas of Destiny (El Phantasmo and Hikuleo) (Strong Openweight Tag Team) (with Jado), Bullet Club (Kenta and Chase Owens) (IWGP Tag Team), and Bishamon (Hirooki Goto and Yoshi-Hashi) by pinfall	Four-way tornado tag team elimination Winners Take All match for both the IWGP Tag Team Championship and Strong Openweight Tag Team Championship	16:24
7	Shingo Takagi (c) vs. Henare ended in a draw	Singles match for the NEVER Openweight Championship	14:35
8	Jon Moxley (c) (with Shota Umino, Tiger Mask, Yuji Nagata, Togi Makabe and Hiroyoshi Tenzan) defeated Evil (with House of Torture (Ren Narita, Yoshinobu Kanemaru, Yujiro Takahashi and Dick Togo)) by pinfall	Lumberjack Deathmatch for the IWGP World Heavyweight Championship	25:01
9	El Desperado defeated Taiji Ishimori by pinfall	Best of the Super Jr. 31 tournament final	23:36
(c) / – the champion(s) heading into the match

=== Tag Team elimination match ===
Elimination	Wrestler	Team	Eliminated by	Elimination move	Time
1	Hikuleo	Guerrillas of Destiny (Strong Openweight Tag Team Champions)	Mikey Nicholls	Pinned after TMDK's Tankbuster	6:26
2	Chase Owens	Bullet Club (IWGP Tag Team Champions)	Hirooki Goto	Pinned after Bishamon's Shoutou	11:17
3	YOSHI-HASHI	Bishamon	Mikey Nicholls	Pinned after TMDK's Tankbuster	16:24
Winners:	TMDK (Shane Haste and Mikey Nicholls) - New IWGP Tag Team and Strong Openweight Tag Team Champions				
