= The New Beginning in Osaka (2024) =

2024 professional wrestling event

- Promotion: New Japan Pro-Wrestling
- Date: February 11, 2024
- City: Osaka, Japan
- Venue: Osaka Prefectural Gymnasium
- Attendance: 5,400

Event chronology
← Previous; Road to The New Beginning	Next → Fantastica Mania 2024; The New Beginning in Sapporo

The New Beginning chronology
← Previous; Nagoya (2024)	Next → Sapporo (2024)

The New Beginning in Osaka was a professional wrestling event promoted by New Japan Pro-Wrestling (NJPW). The event took place on February 11, 2024, in Osaka at the Osaka Prefectural Gymnasium. It was the thirty-ninth event under the New Beginning name and the eighth to take place in Osaka.

There were eight matches contested at the event. In the main event, Bullet Club War Dogs (Alex Coughlin, Gabe Kidd, Clark Connors, Drilla Moloney and David Finlay) defeated United Empire (Will Ospreay, Henare, Jeff Cobb and Catch 2/2 (Francesco Akira and TJP)) in a Steel Cage match. In other prominent matches, Zack Sabre Jr. defeated Bryan Danielson and Kazuchika Okada defeated Hiroshi Tanahashi.

The event was also notable for Will Ospreay's final match in NJPW, as he would depart the company afterwards after signing with All Elite Wrestling (AEW).

== Production ==
=== Storylines ===
The New Beginning in Osaka featured professional wrestling matches that involves different wrestlers from pre-existing scripted feuds and storylines. Wrestlers portrayed villains, heroes, or less distinguishable characters in scripted events that built tension and culminated in a wrestling match or series of matches.

== Results ==
No.	Results	Stipulations	Times
1	Chaos (Toru Yano and Yoh) defeated Ryusuke Taguchi and Oleg Boltin by pinfall	Tag team match	3:45
2	Bishamon (Hirooki Goto and Yoshi-Hashi) defeated United Empire (Callum Newman and Great-O-Khan) by pinfall	Tag team match	7:37
3	House of Torture (Evil, Ren Narita, Yujiro Takahashi and Sho) defeated Tiger Mask, Shota Umino, El Desperado and Tomoaki Honma by pinfall	Eight-man tag team match	8:43
4	Just 5 Guys (Taichi, Yuya Uemura, Douki, Taka Michinoku and Sanada) defeated Los Ingobernables de Japon (Bushi, Yota Tsuji, Hiromu Takahashi, Shingo Takagi and Tetsuya Naito) by submission	Ten-man tag team match	11:05
5	Kazuchika Okada defeated Hiroshi Tanahashi by pinfall	Singles match	16:50
6	Bullet Club (Chase Owens and Kenta) defeated Guerrillas of Destiny (Hikuleo and El Phantasmo) (c) by pinfall	Tag team match for the IWGP Tag Team Championship	13:11
7	Zack Sabre Jr. defeated Bryan Danielson by pinfall	Singles match	32:46
8	Bullet Club War Dogs (David Finlay, Gabe Kidd, Alex Coughlin, Clark Connors and Drilla Moloney) defeated United Empire (Will Ospreay, Jeff Cobb, Henare, Francesco Akira and TJP) by pinfall	Dog Pound match	1:04:05
(c) / – the champion(s) heading into the match
