= The New Beginning in Sapporo (2024) =

2024 professional wrestling event

- Promotion: New Japan Pro-Wrestling
- Date: February 23–24, 2024
- City: Sapporo, Japan
- Venue: Hokkaido Prefectural Sports Center
- Attendance: Night 1: 3,231; Night 2: 5,355; Total: 8,586

Event chronology
← Previous; Fantastica Mania 2024; The New Beginning in Osaka	Next → NJPW 52nd Anniversary Show; Sakura Genesis

The New Beginning chronology
← Previous; Osaka (2024)	Next → Osaka (2025)

The New Beginning in Sapporo was a two-night professional wrestling event promoted by New Japan Pro-Wrestling (NJPW). The event took place across two nights on February 23 and 24, 2024 in Sapporo, Hokkaido at the Hokkaido Prefectural Sports Center. It was the fortieth event under the New Beginning chronology and the sixth to take place in Sapporo.

A combined total of twenty matches were contested at the event, including a total of two on the pre-show. In the main event of Night 1, Nic Nemeth defeated David Finlay to win the IWGP Global Heavyweight Championship. In other prominent matches, Matt Riddle defeated Hiroshi Tanahashi to win the NJPW World Television Championship, Mayu Iwatani defeated Mina Shirakawa to retain the IWGP Women's Championship, and Chaos (Bishamon (Hirooki Goto and Yoshi-Hashi), Tomohiro Ishii, Yoh and Kazuchika Okada) defeated United Empire (Callum Newman, Jeff Cobb, Great-O-Khan, Francesco Akira and Heanfe).

In the main event of Night 2, Tetsuya Naito defeated Sanada to retain the IWGP World Heavyweight Championship. In other prominent matches, Yota Tsuji defeated Yuya Uemura in a Hair vs. Hair match, Guerrillas of Destiny (El Phantasmo and Hikuleo) defeated Guerrillas of Destiny (Tama Tonga and Tanga Loa) in which Jado served as the special guest referee, and Chaos (Bishamon (Hirooki Goto and Yoshi-Hashi), Tomohiro Ishii, Yoh and Kazuchika Okada) defeated United Empire (Callum Newman, Jeff Cobb, Francesco Akira, Great-O-Khan) and Matt Riddle.

The event was also notable for the final NJPW matches of Tama Tonga and Kazuchika Okada, as both men would depart the company after this event and sign with WWE and All Elite Wrestling (AEW) respectively.

== Production ==
=== Storylines ===
The New Beginning in Osaka featured professional wrestling matches that involved different wrestlers from pre-existing scripted feuds and storylines. Wrestlers portrayed villains, heroes, or less distinguishable characters in scripted events that built tension and culminated in a wrestling match or series of matches.

== Results ==
=== Night 1 ===
No.	Results	Stipulations	Times
1^{P}	Tomoya and Toru Yano defeated Tomoaki Honma and Shoma Kato by pinfall	Tag team match	7:10
2	Zack Sabre Jr. defeated Yuji Nagata by submission	Singles match	7:56
3	House of Torture (Yujiro Takahashi, Yoshinobu Kanemaru and Ren Narita) defeated Togi Makabe, Ryusuke Taguchi and Oleg Boltin by pinfall	Six-man tag team match	7:28
4	Chaos (Bishamon (Hirooki Goto and Yoshi-Hashi), Tomohiro Ishii, Yoh, and Kazuchika Okada) defeated United Empire (Callum Newman, Jeff Cobb, Great-O-Khan, Henare and Francesco Akira) by pinfall	Ten-man tag team match	10:58
5	Los Ingobernables de Japon (Tetsuya Naito, Yota Tsuji, Hiromu Takahashi, Bushi and Shingo Takagi) defeated Just 5 Guys (Sanada, Taichi, Yuya Uemura, Douki and Taka Michinoku) by pinfall	Ten-man tag team match	10:17
6	Mayu Iwatani (c) defeated Mina Shirakawa by pinfall	Singles match for the IWGP Women's Championship	12:28
7	Sho defeated El Desperado (c) by countout	Singles match for the IWGP Junior Heavyweight Championship; Had Sho lost, he would have had to join Strong Style.	17:26
8	Evil (c) (with Dick Togo) defeated Shota Umino by pinfall	Singles match for the NEVER Openweight Championship	16:02
9	Matt Riddle defeated Hiroshi Tanahashi (c) by pinfall	Singles match for the NJPW World Television Championship	8:34
10	Nic Nemeth defeated David Finlay (c) by pinfall	Singles match for the IWGP Global Heavyweight Championship	24:02
(c) / – the champion(s) heading into the match; P / – the match was broadcast on the pre-show

=== Night 2 ===
No.	Results	Stipulations	Times
1^{P}	Tomoya and Toru Yano defeated Tomoaki Honma and Katsuya Murashima by pinfall	Tag team match	7:48
2	Togi Makabe, El Desperado, Yoh, Oleg Boltin and Shota Umino defeated House of Torture (Evil, Ren Narita, Yujiro Takahashi, Sho and Yoshinobu Kanemaru) by pinfall	Ten-man tag team match	7:50
3	Chaos (Bishamon (Hirooki Goto and Yoshi-Hashi), Tomohiro Ishii, Yoh and Kazuchika Okada) defeated United Empire (Callum Newman, Jeff Cobb, Great-O-Khan and Francesco Akira) and Matt Riddle by pinfall	Ten-man tag team match	11:34
4	Guerrillas of Destiny (El Phantasmo and Hikuleo) defeated Guerrillas of Destiny (Tama Tonga and Tanga Loa) by pinfall	Tag team match with Jado as the special guest referee.	14:04
5	Ryusuke Taguchi and Nic Nemeth defeated Bullet Club War Dogs (David Finlay and Gedo) by pinfall	Tag team match	7:35
6	Bushi defeated Taka Michinoku by submission	Singles match	9:13
7	Douki defeated Hiromu Takahashi by pinfall	Singles match	14:45
8	Taichi defeated Shingo Takagi by pinfall	Singles match	16:28
9	Yota Tsuji defeated Yuya Uemura by pinfall	Hair vs. Hair match	28:20
10	Tetsuya Naito (c) defeated Sanada by pinfall	Singles match for the IWGP World Heavyweight Championship	24:05
(c) / – the champion(s) heading into the match; P / – the match was broadcast on the pre-show
