= Wrestle Kingdom 18 =

2024 New Japan Pro-Wrestling event

- Promotional poster featuring Sanada and Tetsuya Naito
- Promotion: New Japan Pro-Wrestling
- Date: January 4, 2024
- City: Tokyo, Japan
- Venue: Tokyo Dome
- Attendance: 27,422

Event chronology
← Previous; Lonestar Shootout 2023; Road to Tokyo Dome	Next → New Year Dash!!

Wrestle Kingdom chronology
← Previous; 17	Next → 19

Wrestle Kingdom 18 was a professional wrestling event promoted by the New Japan Pro-Wrestling (NJPW). The event took place on January 4, 2024, at the Tokyo Dome, in Tokyo, Japan. It was the 33rd January 4 Tokyo Dome Show and the 18th promoted under the Wrestle Kingdom name. Wrestlers from NJPW partner promotions All Elite Wrestling (AEW) and Pro Wrestling Noah (Noah) were featured at the event. This was the first Wrestle Kingdom event to feature Hiroshi Tanahashi as the new president of New Japan Pro-Wrestling. This was the first Wrestle Kingdom since Wrestle Kingdom 13 to have a one-night format, as the previous Wrestle Kingdoms had been held across multiple nights in a row.

Eleven matches were contested at the event, with one taking place on the pre-show. In the main event, G1 Climax winner Tetsuya Naito defeated Sanada to win the IWGP World Heavyweight Championship. In other prominent matches, Kazuchika Okada defeated Bryan Danielson, David Finlay defeated Will Ospreay and Jon Moxley to become the inaugural IWGP Global Heavyweight Champion and Hiroshi Tanahashi defeated Zack Sabre Jr. to win the NJPW World Television Championship. The event was also notable for appearances by former WWE wrestler Dolph Ziggler, now known using his real name Nic Nemeth, and his brother Ryan Nemeth who were in the front row.

== Production ==
Other on-screen personnel
Role:	Name:
English Commentators	Kevin Kelly
English Commentators	Chris Charlton
English Commentators	Gino Gambino
English Commentators	Rocky Romero
Japanese Commentators	Shinpei Nogami
Japanese Commentators	Milano Collection A.T.
Japanese Commentators	Katsuhiko Kanazawa
Japanese Commentators	Kazuyoshi Sakai
Japanese Commentators	Togi Makabe (Guest)
Japanese Commentators	Masahiro Chono (Guest)
Ring announcers	Hidekazu Tanaka
Ring announcers	Kimihiko Ozaki
Ring announcers	Makoto Abe
Referees	Norio Honaga
Referees	Kenta Sato
Referees	Yuya Sakamoto
Referees	Marty Asami
Referees	Red Shoes Unno
Referees	Tiger Hattori

=== Background ===
The January 4 Tokyo Dome Show is NJPW's biggest annual event and has been called "the largest professional wrestling show in the world outside of the United States" and the "Japanese equivalent to the Super Bowl". The show has been promoted under the Wrestle Kingdom name since 2007.

Wrestle Kingdom 18 was announced on July 5, 2023 at Independence Day.

=== Storylines ===
Wrestle Kingdom 18 featured professional wrestling matches that involved different wrestlers from pre-existing scripted feuds and storylines. Wrestlers portrayed villains, heroes, or less distinguishable characters in the scripted events that built tension and culminated in a wrestling match or series of matches.

On August 19 2023, Tetsuya Naito won the G1 Climax, thus earning an IWGP World Heavyweight Championship match. On October 9, 2023 at Destruction in Ryōgoku, Sanada successfully defended the IWGP World Heavyweight Championship against Evil in a Lumberjack match, officially setting up himself and Naito for the world title as the main event of Wrestle Kingdom 18.

On June 25, 2023, at the AEW and NJPW partnered event, Forbidden Door, Bryan Danielson defeated Kazuchika Okada in the main event, despite Danielson suffering a broken arm midway through the match. On the October 25, 2023 episode of AEW Dynamite, Okada teamed with Orange Cassidy in a losing effort against Danielson and Claudio Castagnoli; towards the end of the match, Danielson suffered a broken orbital bone. On November 4, 2023 at Power Struggle, Okada, Hiroshi Tanahashi, and Tomohiro Ishii successfully defended the NEVER Openweight Six-Man Tag Team Championship against TMDK (Zack Sabre Jr., Mikey Nicholls and Shane Haste). After the match, the lights went off and Danielson appeared on the titantron to challenge Okada to a rematch at Wrestle Kingdom, which Okada accepted, making the rematch official.

At the same Power Struggle event, Hiromu Takahashi successfully defended the IWGP Junior Heavyweight Championship against Taiji Ishimori. After the match, Takahashi challenged El Desperado for the title, which Desperado accepted. The match was then made official for Wrestle Kingdom 18.

Also at Power Struggle, Will Ospreay defeated Shota Umino in the main event to retain the IWGP United States Heavyweight Championship (though referred to by Ospreay as the IWGP United Kingdom Heavyweight Championship with his own custom belt). After showing respect to Umino, Ospreay called out Umino's former mentor, AEW's Jon Moxley, and both men were attacked from behind by Bullet Club leader David Finlay, who took a mallet and smashed both the U.S. and Ospreay's custom UK belt. It was then announced that Ospreay, Moxley, and Finlay would fight a three-way match at Wrestle Kingdom 18. At a press conference on November 6, 2023, NJPW chairman Naoki Sugabayashi announced that a new championship would replace the U.S./U.K. championship. On December 11, 2023, Sugabayashi revealed the name of the new championship as the IWGP Global Heavyweight Championship with the winner becoming the inaugural champion.

From October 21 2023 until November 2 2023, the 2023 Super Junior Tag League tournament matches took place during the Road to Power Struggle Tour. Catch 2/2 (Francesco Akira and TJP) defeated Intergalactic Jet Setters (Kushida and Kevin Knight) in the semi-finals to advanced to the finals while House of Torture (Sho and Yoshinobu Kanemaru) defeated El DespeWato (El Desperado and Master Wato) to also advance. Both teams finished the tournament with a record of six wins and three losses, setting up the finals of the tournament. In the finals Catch 2/2 defeated House of Torture to win the Super Junior Tag League, thus earning an IWGP Junior Heavyweight Tag Team Championship match against Bullet Club War Dogs (Drilla Moloney and Clark Connors) at Wrestle Kingdom 18.

At Fighting Spirit Unleashed, Shingo Takagi defeated Tama Tonga to win the NEVER Openweight Championship. At Lonestar Shootout, Takagi defeated Trent Beretta to retain the NEVER Openweight title. After the match, Takagi called out anyone to challenge him for the title. Tonga then came out and said that he wanted a rematch for the title. Takagi accepted and said that the match will take place at Wrestle Kingdom.

After successfully defending his NJPW World Television Championship against Mike Bailey at Lonestar Shootout, Zack Sabre Jr. called out Hiroshi Tanahashi and challenged him to a match at Wrestle Kingdom. NJPW then announced that Sabre Jr. will defend his title against Tanahashi at Wrestle Kingdom 18.

In the 2023 edition of the World Tag League, IWGP Tag Team Champions Bishamon (Hirooki Goto and Yoshi-Hashi) won in Block A, while Strong Openweight Tag Team Champions Guerrillas of Destiny (Hikuleo and El Phantasmo) won in Block B, leading them to face each other in the finals. In the finals on December 10, Bishamon won for a third year in a row, allowing them to use their champion's privilege to choose their opponents for Wrestle Kingdom. Bishamon challenged the G.O.D. to a rematch for both sets of titles.

== Results ==
No.	Results	Stipulations	Times
1^{P}	Great-O-Khan, Taiji Ishimori, Toru Yano and Yoh won (Note: The other participants were Gabriel Kidd, Alex Coughlin, Jeff Cobb, Henare, Shane Haste, Mikey Nicholls, Tomohiro Ishii, Master Wato, Fujita "Jr." Hayato, Douki, Sho, Yujiro Takahashi, Yoshinobu Kanemaru, Takashi Iizuka, Taichi and Chase Owens.)	New Japan Ranbo to determine who will challenge for the Provisional KOPW 2024 Championship at New Year Dash!!	32:40
2	Catch 2/2 (TJP and Francesco Akira) defeated Bullet Club War Dogs (Drilla Moloney and Clark Connors) (c) by pinfall	Tag team match for the IWGP Junior Heavyweight Tag Team Championship	9:38
3	Hiroshi Tanahashi defeated Zack Sabre Jr. (c) by pinfall	Singles match for the NJPW World Television Championship	8:53
4	Yuya Uemura defeated Yota Tsuji by pinfall	Singles match	10:57
5	House of Torture (Evil and Ren Narita) defeated Shota Umino and Kaito Kiyomiya by pinfall	Tag team match	7:06
6	Tama Tonga defeated Shingo Takagi (c) by pinfall	Singles match for the NEVER Openweight Championship	12:56
7	Guerrillas of Destiny (El Phantasmo and Hikuleo) (Strong Openweight) defeated Bishamon (Hirooki Goto and Yoshi-Hashi) (IWGP) by pinfall	Winners Takes All tag team match for the IWGP Tag Team Championship and Strong Openweight Tag Team Championship	8:56
8	El Desperado defeated Hiromu Takahashi (c) by pinfall	Singles match for the IWGP Junior Heavyweight Championship	14:19
9	David Finlay defeated Will Ospreay and Jon Moxley by pinfall	Three-way match for the inaugural IWGP Global Heavyweight Championship (Note: Replaced the retired IWGP United States Heavyweight Championship.)	22:15
10	Kazuchika Okada defeated Bryan Danielson by pinfall	Singles match	23:30
11	Tetsuya Naito defeated Sanada (c) by pinfall	Singles match for the IWGP World Heavyweight Championship	25:43
(c) / – the champion(s) heading into the match; P / – the match was broadcast on the pre-show

== See also ==
- 2024 in professional wrestling
- List of NJPW pay-per-view events
- Professional wrestling at the Tokyo Dome
