= Henare =

Henare or Hēnare is a Māori surname, originally an adaptation of the English name Henry. It is also (usually historically) encountered as a given name.

== Surname ==
- Bryan Henare (born 1974), New Zealand rugby league player
- George Henare (born 1945), New Zealand actor
- James Hēnare (1911–1989), New Zealand tribal leader
- Paul Henare (born 1979), New Zealand basketball player and coach
- Richard Henare (born 1968), New Zealand rugby league player
- Robert Henare (born 1978), New Zealand rugby league player
- Tau Henare (born 1960), New Zealand politician
- Taurekareka Hēnare (1878–1940), New Zealand politician

== Given name ==
- Henare Te Raumoa Huatahi Balneavis (1880–1940), New Zealand interpreter
- Henare Kaihau (1854/1860?–1920), New Zealand politician
- Hēnare Kōhere (1880–1960), New Zealand soldier
- Henare Matua (c. 1838–1894), New Zealand tribal leader
- Henare Potae (died 1895), New Zealand tribal leader
- Henare Wiremu Taratoa (c. 1830–1864), New Zealand missionary
- Henare Te Atua (died 1912), New Zealand tribal leader
- Henare Wepiha Te Wainohu (1882–1920), New Zealand tribal leader
- Hēnare Mātene Te Whiwhi (died 1881), New Zealand tribal leader
- Henare Tomoana (1820s/1830s–1904), New Zealand politician
- Henare Uru (1872–1929), New Zealand politician

== Stage name ==
- Henare (wrestler) (born 1992), New Zealand professional wrestler previously also known as Aaron Henry, Aaron Henare, and Toa Henare
