= Dominion 6.4 in Osaka-jo Hall =

2023 New Japan Pro-Wrestling event

- Promotional poster featuring various wrestlers
- Promotion: New Japan Pro-Wrestling
- Date: June 4, 2023
- City: Osaka, Japan
- Venue: Osaka-jō Hall
- Attendance: 7,040

Event chronology
← Previous; Resurgence	Next → All Together Again

Dominion chronology
← Previous; 6.12	Next → 6.9

Dominion 6.4 in Osaka-jo Hall was a professional wrestling event promoted by New Japan Pro-Wrestling (NJPW). The event took place on June 4, 2023, in Osaka, Osaka, at the Osaka-jō Hall and was the 15th event under the Dominion name and ninth in a row to take place at the Osaka-jō Hall.

== Production ==
=== Storylines ===
Dominion 6.4 in Osaka-jo Hall featured professional wrestling matches that involved different wrestlers from pre-existing scripted feuds and storylines. Wrestlers portrayed villains, heroes, or less distinguishable characters in the scripted events that built tension and culminated in a wrestling match or series of matches.

On April 9, NJPW announced a tournament will take place which the winner would receive a future IWGP United States Heavyweight Championship match with the participants being former title holders; Lance Archer, Juice Robinson, Will Ospreay and Hiroshi Tanahashi. On April 16, NJPW suspended Juice Robinson for attacking Fred Rosser before their match at Capital Collision, as a result Rosser took Robinson's place in the tournament. Archer would defeat Rosser on April 16 at Collision in Philadelphia in order to advance to the finals. Opsreay and Tanahashi would face each other at Resurgence on May 21, with the winner facing Archer at Dominion.

On May 3, at Wrestling Dontaku, Sanada would successfully defend the IWGP World Heavyweight Championship against former Los Ingobernables de Japon stablemate Hiromu Takahashi in the main event. After the match, saw the return of Yota Tsuji from excursion, who would take out Sanada's Just 5 Guys stablemates and then speared Sanada in the ring, Tsuji held up the IWGP World Heavyweight Championship indicating a future title match. The title match was announced the following day for Dominion.

=== Event ===
The show started with a dark match in which Yuto Nakashima, Ryohei Oiwa and Boltin Oleg defeated Oskar Leube. The first main card match saw Will Ospreay defeating Lance Archer to become the number one contender for the IWGP United States Heavyweight Championship.

Next up, Tetsuya Naito, Shingo Takagi, Bushi and Titán of the Los Ingobernables de Japon picked up a win over Just 5 Guys (Taichi, Douki, Yoshinobu Kanemaru and Taka Michinoku) in eight-man tag team action.

In the fourth bout, Francesco Akira and TJP defeated Kushida and Kevin Knight to win the IWGP Junior Heavyweight Tag Team Championship for the second time as a team. Dan Moloney accompanied them to the ring, and as soon as the bout concluded, Clark Connors came down to the ring to challenge both Akira and TJP, only to have Moloney attack the latters, hinting his betrayal on the United Empire and joining Bullet Club in the process.

Next up, Zack Sabre Jr. defeated Jeff Cobb to secure the tenth consecutive defense of the NJPW World Television Championship in that respective reign.

In the sixth bout, Bishamon (Hirooki Goto and Yoshi-Hashi) defeated House of Torture (Evil and Yujiro Takahashi) and United Empire (Great-O-Khan and Aaron Henare) to win the vacant IWGP Tag Team Championship and Strong Openweight Tag Team Championship after Aussie Open's Kyle Fletcher and Mark Davis relinquished the titles at Resurgence 2023 due to Davis getting sidelined with injury. After the bout concluded, Bullet Club War Dogs (Alex Coughlin and Gabriel Kidd) attacked both Yoshi-Hashi and Goto, materializing their challenger status for both sets of titles.

The seventh bout saw David Finlay outmatching El Phantasmo to secure the first defense of the NEVER Openweight Championship in that respective reign, continuing the grudges between the two wrestlers, after Bullet Club kicked Phantasmo out of the group at Sakura Genesis.

In the eighth bout, Hiromu Takahashi retained the IWGP Junior Heavyweight Championship over the 2023 Best of the Super Juniors winner Master Wato.

In the semi main event, Kazuchika Okada, Tomohiro Ishii and Hiroshi Tanahashi successfully defended the NEVER Openweight 6-Man Tag Team Championship against Jon Moxley, Claudio Castagnoli and Shota Umino. After the bout concluded, a video of Bryan Danielson challenging Okada to a singles match was played.

In the main event, Sanada defeated Yota Tsuji to retain the IWGP World Heavyweight Championship for the second time consecutively in that respective reign after Tsuji challenged him at Sakura Genesis, when he announced the completion of his foreign excursion. After the bout concluded, Sanada said that he would win the G1 Climax and choose Just 5 Guys stablemate Taichi as his opponent for the title, if he won the tournament.

== Results ==
No.	Results	Stipulations	Times
1^{D}	Yuto Nakashima, Ryohei Oiwa and Boltin Oleg defeated Oskar Leube	Young Lion Hat-trick Challenge	2:55
2	Will Ospreay defeated Lance Archer	Tournament final match to determine the #1 contender for the IWGP United States Heavyweight Championship	8:01
3	Los Ingobernables de Japon (Tetsuya Naito, Shingo Takagi, Bushi and Titán) defeated Just 5 Guys (Taichi, Douki, Yoshinobu Kanemaru and Taka Michinoku)	Eight-man tag team match	9:24
4	Catch 2/2 (Francesco Akira and TJP) (with Dan Moloney) defeated Intergalactic Jet Setters (Kushida and Kevin Knight) (c)	Tag team match for the IWGP Junior Heavyweight Tag Team Championship	10:38
5	Zack Sabre Jr. (c) (with Kosei Fujita) defeated Jeff Cobb	Singles match for the NJPW World Television Championship	8:46
6	Bishamon (Hirooki Goto and Yoshi-Hashi) defeated House of Torture (Evil and Yujiro Takahashi) and United Empire (Great-O-Khan and Aaron Henare)	Three-way tag team match for the vacant IWGP Tag Team Championship and Strong Openweight Tag Team Championship	13:15
7	David Finlay (c) defeated El Phantasmo	Singles match for the NEVER Openweight Championship	18:51
8	Hiromu Takahashi (c) defeated Master Wato	Singles match for the IWGP Junior Heavyweight Championship	19:50
9	Chaos (Kazuchika Okada and Tomohiro Ishii) and Hiroshi Tanahashi (c) defeated Blackpool Combat Club (Jon Moxley and Claudio Castagnoli) and Shota Umino	Six-man tag team match for the NEVER Openweight 6-Man Tag Team Championship	20:37
10	Sanada (c) defeated Yota Tsuji	Singles match for the IWGP World Heavyweight Championship	17:01
(c) / – the champion(s) heading into the match; D / – this was a dark match

=== IWGP United States Heavyweight Championship #1 contender tournament ===
First Round; Collision in Philadelphia (April 16); Resurgence (May 21)
Lance Archer	Pin
Fred Rosser (Note: Juice Robinson was originally scheduled to face Archer in the first round but was suspended due to attacking Rosser before their match at Capital Collision, as a result Robinson was replaced by Rosser.)	14:22
Will Ospreay	Pin
Hiroshi Tanahashi	16:44

Finals; Dominion 6.4 in Osaka-jo Hall (June 4)
Lance Archer	8:01
Will Ospreay	Pin
