= Battle Autumn '22 =

2022 New Japan Pro-Wrestling professional wrestling event

- Promotion: New Japan Pro-Wrestling
- Date: November 5, 2022
- City: Osaka, Japan
- Venue: Osaka Prefectural Gymnasium
- Attendance: 4,006

Event chronology
← Previous; Rumble on 44th Street	Next → Historic X-Over

Battle Autumn '22 was a professional wrestling event produced by New Japan Pro-Wrestling (NJPW). It took place on November 5, 2022 in Osaka, Japan at Osaka Prefectural Gymnasium.

Battle Autumn featured the return of Shota Umino, who returned after Will Ospreay called out any NJPW wrestler, after the successful defense of his IWGP United States Championship against Tetsuya Naito.

== Storylines ==
Battle Autumn featured nine professional wrestling matches that involved different wrestlers from pre-existing scripted feuds and storylines. Wrestlers portrayed villains, heroes, or less distinguishable characters in the scripted events that built tension and culminated in a wrestling match or series of matches.

== Results ==
No.	Results	Stipulations	Times
1	Catch 2/2 (TJP and Francesco Akira) (c) defeated Los Ingobernables de Japon (Bushi and Titán)	Tag team match for the IWGP Junior Heavyweight Tag Team Championship	11:36
2	United Empire (Aaron Henare, Gideon Grey and Aussie Open (Mark Davis and Kyle Fletcher) defeated Hiroshi Tanahashi, Toru Yano, David Finlay and Alex Zayne	Eight-man tag team match	9:50
3	Hikuleo (with Jado) defeated Yujiro Takahashi (with Sho and Pieter) (Note: Originally Karl Anderson was scheduled to defend the NEVER Openweight Championship against Hikuleo at the event but was also scheduled to work WWE's Crown Jewel in Saudi Arabia on the same day. Anderson claimed that he was double booked and that he has no intention in defending the title at Battle Autumn. NJPW President Takami Ohbari, later stated that no changes has yet been made to the card and the title will still be defended at the event. On October 26, in an official statement by NJPW, Anderson would be stripped of the title if he did not honour his scheduled title defence as NEVER Openweight champion. The match was changed to a regular match between Hikuleo and Yujiro Takahashi after NJPW could not reach Anderson.)	Singles match	0:28
4	Ren Narita defeated Sanada	NJPW World Television Championship tournament semifinal match	14:31
5	Zack Sabre Jr. defeated Evil (with Dick Togo)	NJPW World Television Championship tournament semifinal match	4:48
6	Master Wato and El Desperado defeated Taiji Ishimori and Hiromu Takahashi	Tag team match	16:48
7	Kazuchika Okada and Tama Tonga (with Jado) defeated Bullet Club (Jay White and Kenta) (with Gedo)	Tag team match	17:34
8	FTR (Dax Harwood and Cash Wheeler) (c) defeated United Empire (Great-O-Khan and Jeff Cobb) (with Gideon Grey)	Tag team match for the IWGP Tag Team Championship	17:31
9	Will Ospreay (c) (with Gideon Grey) defeated Tetsuya Naito	Singles match for the IWGP United States Heavyweight Championship	30:07
(c) / – the champion(s) heading into the match
