= NJPW World Television Championship =

Professional wrestling championship

- The championship belt

Details
- Promotion: New Japan Pro-Wrestling (NJPW)
- Date established: October 10, 2022
- Current champion: Toru Yano
- Date won: November 19, 2026
Statistics
- First champion: Zack Sabre Jr.
- Most reigns: 2 reigns: Zack Sabre Jr.; El Phantasmo
- Longest reign: Zack Sabre Jr. (1st reign, 365 days)
- Shortest reign: Zack Sabre Jr. (2nd reign, 21 days)
- Oldest champion: Toru Yano (48 years, 6 months and 1 day)
- Youngest champion: Ren Narita (26 years, 10 months and 15 days)
- Heaviest champion: Jeff Cobb (263 lb (119 kg))
- Lightest champion: El Phantasmo (186 lb (84 kg))

The NJPW World Television Championship (Japanese: NJPW WORLD認定TV王座, Hepburn: Nyū Japan Wārudo-nintei Tī Vī Ōza) is a professional wrestling championship owned by the New Japan Pro-Wrestling (NJPW) promotion. The inaugural champion was Zack Sabre Jr., who has held the championship a record-setting two times. The current champion is Toru Yano, who is in his first reign. He won the title by defeating Shun Skywalker at Tanahashi Jam 2 on November 19, 2026.

== History ==
New Japan Pro-Wrestling president and CEO Takami Ohbari and TV Asahi representative Hiroyoki Mihira announced the creation of the title at Declaration of Power on October 10, 2022. The championship is seen as a celebration of both the upcoming 50-year anniversary of the partnership between the two companies, as well as the continued growth of NJPW World, New Japan Pro-Wrestling's online streaming service. Ohbari also expressed encouragement for younger wrestlers on the roster to compete for the championship.

All matches contested for the championship will be held with a 15-minute time limit. Furthermore, due to its nature as a television championship, all championship matches (including all matches in the inaugural tournament) will be available for free through the NJPW World service, as well as through New Japan Pro-Wrestling's social media platforms.

== Inaugural championship tournament (2022–2023) ==
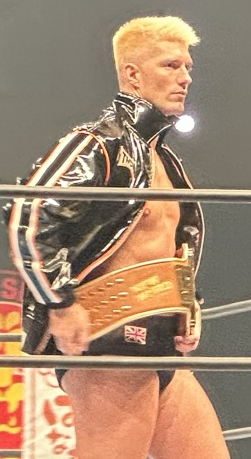
Zack Sabre Jr., who won a tournament and became the first champion. He also holds the record for longest reign and most successful defenses.

The first champion was determined in a sixteen-man single-elimination tournament, which began on October 14, 2022, at Battle Autumn (Night 1) and concluded on January 4, 2023, at Wrestle Kingdom 17. In the event of a time limit draw during the tournament, the winner (and thus, person advancing) was decided by a coin toss.

=== Tournament bracket ===
First round Battle Autumn (Nights 1-3, 9) (October 14, 15, 16 & 26, 2022)
David Finlay	Pin
Yoshinobu Kanemaru	11:52
Alex Zayne	14:55
Zack Sabre Jr.	Sub
Yoshi-Hashi	Pin
Jeff Cobb	12:14
Aaron Henare	10:55
Evil	Pin
Sanada	Pin
Taichi	14:57
Hirooki Goto	9:32
Kenta	Pin
Ren Narita	Pin
Tomohiro Ishii	14:33
Toru Yano	Pin
Great-O-Khan	11:20

Second round Battle Autumn (Nights 10, 12) (October 27 & 30, 2022)
David Finlay	13:03
Zack Sabre Jr.	Pin
Yoshi-Hashi	9:48
Evil	Pin
Sanada	Pin
Kenta	13:05
Ren Narita	Pin
Toru Yano	8:47

Semifinals; Battle Autumn (Night 16) (November 5, 2022)
Zack Sabre Jr.	Pin
Evil	4:48
Sanada	14:31
Ren Narita	Pin

Final; Wrestle Kingdom 17 (Night 1) (January 4, 2023)
Zack Sabre Jr.	Sub
Ren Narita	10:32

== Reigns ==
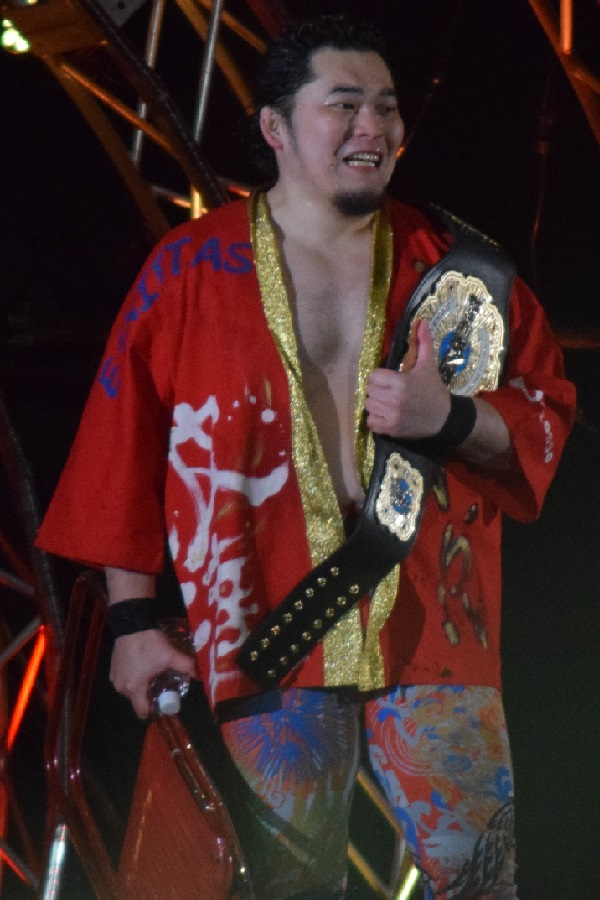
Current champion Toru Yano

As of November 22, 2026, there have been eleven reigns between nine champions. Zack Sabre Jr. was the inaugural champion, with his inaugural reign being the longest at 365 days, his second being the shortest at 21 days, the most title defenses at 16, and is tied with El Phantasmo for the most reigns at two. El Phantasmo holds the record for most combined days at 395. Hiroshi Tanahashi was the first Japanese wrestler to win the title and was the oldest champion at 47 years old. Ren Narita was the youngest champion, winning the title at 26 years old.

Toru Yano is the current champion in his first reign. He won the title by defeating Shun Skywalker at Tanahashi Jam 2 in Korukan Hall Japan, on November 19, 2026.

Key
No.	Overall reign number
Reign	Reign number for the specific champion
Days	Number of days held
Defenses	Number of successful defenses
+	Current reign is changing daily

No.	Champion	Championship change			Reign statistics			Notes	Ref.
No.	Champion	Date	Event	Location	Reign	Days	Defenses	Notes	Ref.
New Japan Pro Wrestling (NJPW)
1	Zack Sabre Jr.	January 4, 2023	Wrestle Kingdom 17; Night 1	Tokyo, Japan	1	365	16	Defeated Ren Narita in the finals of a 16-man single-elimination tournament to become the inaugural champion.	
2	Hiroshi Tanahashi	January 4, 2024	Wrestle Kingdom 18	Tokyo, Japan	1	50	1		
3	Matt Riddle	February 23, 2024	The New Beginning in Sapporo; Night 1	Sapporo, Japan	1	49	2		
4	Zack Sabre Jr.	April 12, 2024	Windy City Riot	Chicago, Illinois, U.S.	2	21	0		
5	Jeff Cobb	May 3, 2024	Wrestling Dontaku; Night 1	Fukuoka, Japan	1	164	3		
6	Ren Narita	October 14, 2024	King of Pro-Wrestling	Tokyo, Japan	1	82	0	This was a three-way match, also involving Yota Tsuji.	
7	El Phantasmo	January 4, 2025	Wrestle Kingdom 19	Tokyo, Japan	1	91	4	This was a four-way match, also involving Jeff Cobb and Ryohei Oiwa.	
8	Great-O-Khan	April 5, 2025	Sakura Genesis	Tokyo, Japan	1	24	0	This title change was via countout	
9	El Phantasmo	April 29, 2025	Wrestling Hizen no Kuni	Saga, Japan	2	304	6		
10	Konosuke Takeshita	February 27, 2026	The New Beginning USA	Trenton, New Jersey, U.S.	1	212	4		
11	Shun Skywalker	September 27, 2026	Destruction in Kobe	Kobe, Japan	1	53	0		
12	Toru Yano	November 19, 2026	Tanahashi Jam 2	Tokyo, Japan	1	1+	0		

== Combined reigns ==
El Phantasmo holds the record for longest combined reigning days as champion at 395.

As of September 30, 2026.

†	Indicates the current champion

Rank	Wrestler	No. of reigns	Combined defenses	Combined days
1	El Phantasmo	2	10	395
2	Zack Sabre Jr.	2	16	386
3	Konosuke Takeshita	1	4	212
4	Jeff Cobb	1	3	164
5	Ren Narita	1	0	82
6	Shun Skywalker	1	0	53
7	Hiroshi Tanahashi	1	1	50
8	Matt Riddle	1	2	49
9	Great-O-Khan	1	0	24
10	Toru Yano †	1	0	1+
