= The Tongans =

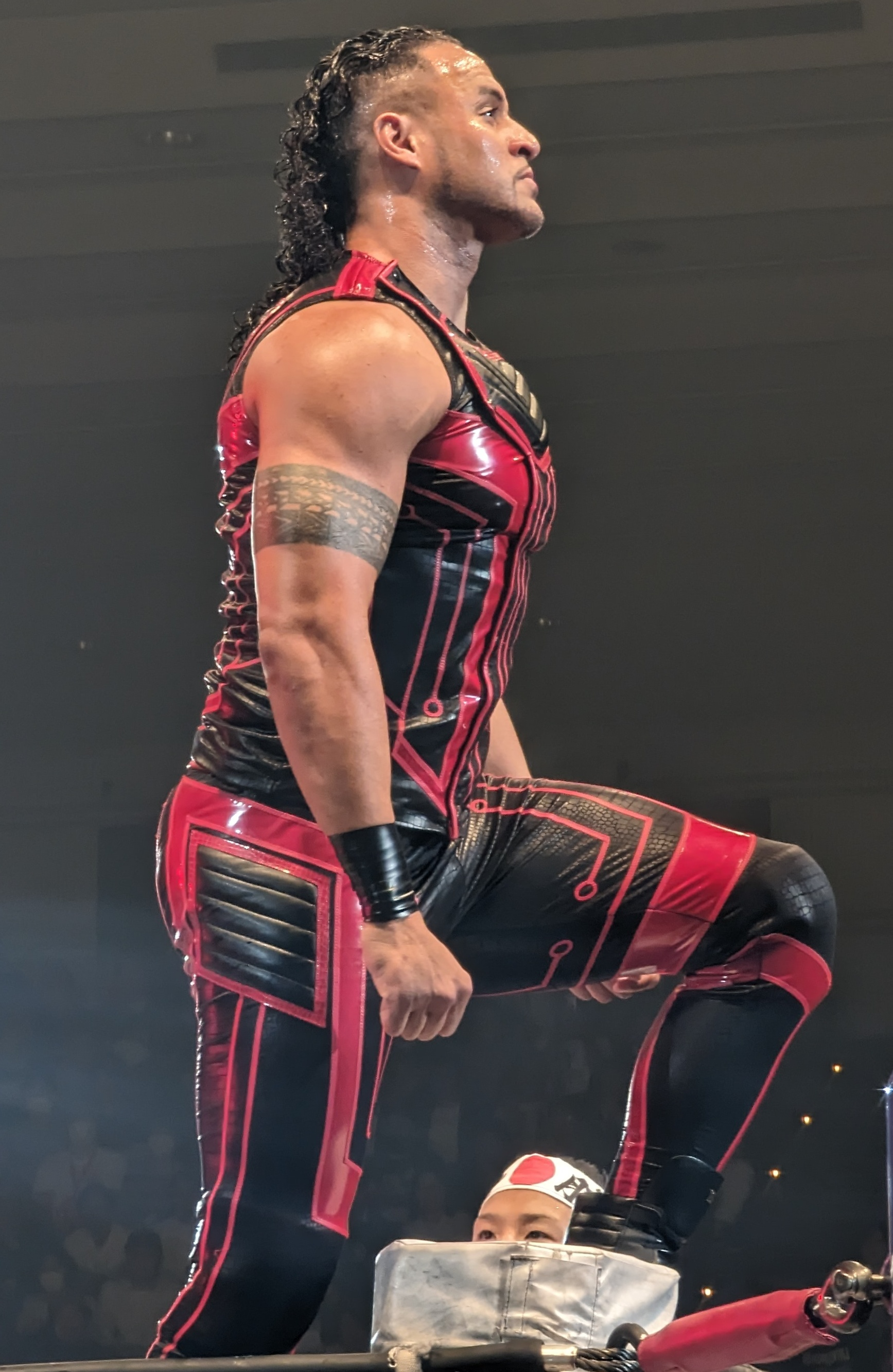
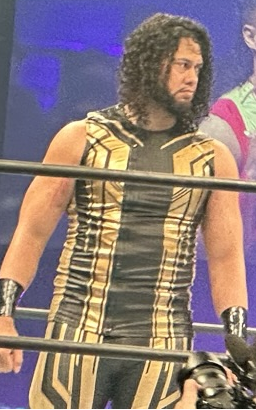
- Tama Tonga (left) and Talla Tonga

Tag team
- Name(s): BC Firing Squad; Bullet Club; G.O.D; Guerrillas of Destiny; Sons of Tonga; The Bloodline; The Tongans; The MFTs
- Members: Tama Tonga; Hikuleo/Talla Tonga
- Manager: Haku
- Billed heights: Tama: 1.83 m (6 ft 0 in); Talla: 2.03 m (6 ft 8 in)
- Combined billed weight: 195 kg (430 lb)
- Billed from: Tonga
- Former members: Jado (manager); El Phantasmo; Tanga Loa/Tonga Loa
- Debut: November 8, 2008
- Years active: 2008–2009; 2016–present
- Trained by: Bubba Ray Dudley; D-Von Dudley; Ricky Santana; Tonga Fifita

The MFTs are a Tongan-American professional wrestling tag team currently consisting of brothers (Note: Tama and Talla are biological brothers however, they were adopted by Haku thus, making them Haku’s adopted sons.) Tama Tonga and Talla Tonga with their father, Haku serving as their manager. They are signed to WWE, and perform on the SmackDown brand where Tama and Talla are the current WWE Tag Team Champions in their first reign as a team. Individually, it is Tama’s third reign and Talla’s first reign.

The brothers Tama Tonga and Tanga Loa first wrestled together in 2008 as Sons of Tonga, a reference to their father Tonga Fifita. Although the team was originally short-lived, the two reformed as Guerrillas of Destiny in New Japan Pro-Wrestling (NJPW) from 2016 to 2024, where they became one of the promotion's prime tag teams, winning the IWGP Tag Team Championship a record seven times, the 2020 World Tag League, and the NEVER Openweight 6-Man Tag Team Championship three times with various stablemates from Bullet Club, of which the two were members until 2022. From 2022 to 2024, Guerillas of Destiny extended into a stable of its own to include their manager Jado, a third brother, Hikuleo, and El Phantasmo.

While working for NJPW, Tonga and Loa also appeared in Ring of Honor (ROH), where they won the ROH World Tag Team Championship, and Impact Wrestling. They both separately left NJPW in early 2024 and reunited in WWE at Backlash France in May as The Tongans (in reference to their Tongan origins), as part of the larger Bloodline stable, which Tonga had joined prior to Loa's arrival. Jado, Hikuleo and El Phantasmo originally continued the Guerillas of Destiny stable without either original brother, leading The Tongans and Guerillas of Destiny to exist simultaneously for over a month until the latter disbanded at Dominion 6.9 in Osaka-jo Hall on June 9, 2024, leaving The Tongans as the sole direct continuation of Guerillas of Destiny. Loa and Hikuleo then reunited at Night of Champions 2025, reviving the stable in the process as a stable under the MFT name led by Sikoa from July 2025 to June 2026 becoming once again a standalone tag team under the same name.

== History ==
=== Training and early careers (2008–2009) ===
Alipate Leone and Tevita Fifita are sons of professional wrestler Tonga Fifita, better known by the ring names Haku, Meng and King Tonga. The two brothers grew up together in Central Florida, but did not immediately gravitate to their father's profession. They finally decided to pursue their own careers in professional wrestling, when Alipate was stationed at Whiteman Air Force Base with the United States Air Force and Tevita was attending University of Texas at El Paso. The brothers started training under their father and Ricky Santana in a ring owned by the Dudley Boyz (Bubba Ray Dudley and D-Von Dudley) at their Team 3D Academy of Professional Wrestling and Sports Entertainment training school in Kissimmee, Florida. Eventually the brothers signed up with the Team 3D Academy, where they would continue their training for a year under the Dudley Boyz.

In 2008, Alipate and Tevita began wrestling under the names Kava and Nuku, respectively, and the team name "Sons of Tonga". In 2009, the brothers took part in a WWE tryout camp, which resulted in Tevita being signed to a contract. Tevita eventually made it to WWE television under the ring name "Camacho", while Alipate traveled first to Puerto Rico and then to Japan, joining New Japan Pro-Wrestling (NJPW) in May 2010, where he became a founding member of the Bullet Club stable in 2013 as "Tama Tonga".

=== New Japan Pro-Wrestling (2016–2024) ===
==== Bullet Club (2016–2022) ====
Logo of Guerrillas of Destiny

On February 14, 2016, at NJPW's The New Beginning in Niigata event, Bullet Club's Doc Gallows and Karl Anderson unsuccessfully challenged G • B • H (Togi Makabe and Tomoaki Honma) for the IWGP Tag Team Championship. Following the match, Gallows and Anderson's stablemate Tama Tonga, entered the ring to challenge Makabe and Honma, stating that his partner would be a new Bullet Club member. The challenge was accepted by Makabe and Honma. On March 12, Tonga revealed that his partner would be his brother Tevita, who was given the ring name "Tanga Loa" (Note: The name has been written as both "Tanga Roa" and "Tanga Loa". NJPW originally used the spelling Roa, but have since switched to Loa.) with their tag team dubbed "Guerrillas of Destiny" (G.O.D.). The brothers together came up with their team name, which references their feeling of "fighting for a cause" and the belief that destiny had brought them back together. The team's acronym stemmed from Alipate's ring name meaning "God of War" and Tevita's ring name meaning "Family of God" in the Polynesian Islands.

Loa made his NJPW debut on March 27, attacking Togi Makabe during his match with Tonga. This led to his first match with the promotion on April 1, where the Bullet Club quintet of Loa, Tonga, Bad Luck Fale, Kenny Omega and Yujiro Takahashi were defeated by Makabe, Tomoaki Honma, Juice Robinson, Hiroshi Tanahashi and Michael Elgin in a ten-man elimination tag team match. On April 10 at Invasion Attack 2016, G.O.D. defeated G.B.H. to become the new IWGP Tag Team Champions. They made their first successful title defense on May 3 at Wrestling Dontaku 2016, defeating G.B.H. in a rematch. Later that month, G.O.D. took part in a North American tour, co-promoted by NJPW and the American Ring of Honor (ROH) promotion. During the War of the Worlds event on May 14, ROH wrestler Jay Briscoe pinned Loa to win an eight-man tag team match between Team ROH and Bullet Club and afterwards announced that he and his brother Mark were coming to NJPW to take the IWGP Tag Team Championship from Loa and Tonga. On June 8, NJPW officially announced that the win had earned the Briscoe Brothers a shot at the IWGP Tag Team Championship. The title match took place on June 19 at Dominion 6.19 in Osaka-jo Hall and saw the Briscoe Brothers end G.O.D.'s title reign and become the new champions.

On September 22 at Destruction in Hiroshima, after the Briscoe Brothers had successfully defended the IWGP Tag Team Championship against Bullet Club's The Young Bucks (Matt Jackson and Nick Jackson), they were attacked by G.O.D., who demanded a title rematch. This led to a match on October 10 at King of Pro-Wrestling, where G.O.D. defeated the Briscoe Brothers to regain the IWGP Tag Team Championship. Following the match, G.O.D. and The Young Bucks attacked the Briscoe Brothers as well as Tomohiro Ishii, who tried to save the former champions. This led directly to G.O.D.'s first title defense on November 5 at Power Struggle, where they defeated Ishii and Yoshi-Hashi. From November 18 to December 10, G.O.D. took part in the 2016 World Tag League. After winning their block with a record of six wins and one loss, G.O.D. advanced to the finals of the tournament, where they were defeated by G.B.H., setting up another title match between the two teams. However, before the match could take place at Wrestle Kingdom 11 in Tokyo Dome, G.O.D.'s title belts were stolen by Toru Yano, which resulted in him and Tomohiro Ishii being added to the match. On January 4, 2017, at Wrestle Kingdom 11 in Tokyo Dome, G.O.D. lost the IWGP Tag Team Championship to Yano and Ishii in the three-way match. The match became infamous for the excessive loud cursing in English by Tonga and Loa. This was the result of their mother telling them that they needed to stand out at the "WrestleMania of New Japan Pro Wrestling". On June 11 at Dominion 6.11 in Osaka-jo Hall, G.O.D. defeated War Machine (Hanson and Raymond Rowe) to win the IWGP Tag Team Championship for the third time. They lost the title back to War Machine in a no disqualification match on July 1 at G1 Special in USA.

In September, Guerrillas of Destiny, War Machine and the Killer Elite Squad (Davey Boy Smith Jr. and Lance Archer) were booked in three three-way matches for the IWGP Tag Team Championship. The first two matches on September 10 at Destruction in Fukushima and September 16 at Destruction in Hiroshima were won by War Machine, while the third match, contested under tornado tag team match rules, on September 24 at Destruction in Kobe was won by the Killer Elite Squad. In December, Guerrillas of Destiny won their block in the 2017 World Tag League with a record of five wins and two losses, advancing to the finals of the tournament. On December 11, they were defeated in the finals of the tournament by Los Ingobernables de Japón (Evil and Sanada). Six days later, Guerrillas of Destiny and Bad Luck Fale defeated Sanada, Evil and Bushi to become the new NEVER Openweight 6-Man Tag Team Champions. They lost the title to Chaos (Beretta, Tomohiro Ishii and Toru Yano) in a five-team gauntlet match on January 4, 2018, at Wrestle Kingdom 12 in Tokyo Dome.

Guerrillas of Destiny spent the bulk of 2018 being embroiled in the Bullet Club civil war, as part of the OG faction of the group, feuding with the Elite faction. The Elite would ultimately separate from Bullet Club, and G.O.D. would remain with the new streamlined Bullet Club under new leader Jay White, while also gaining a new manager in Jado. On August 12 during the G1 Climax event, G.O.D. won their third NEVER Openweight 6-Man Title, this time teaming with Bullet Club teammate Taiji Ishimori, and would hold the championships until January 30, 2019, losing them to Taguchi Japan at a Road to New Beginning event.

On February 23, 2019, they would regain the IWGP Heavyweight Tag Team Titles by defeating Sanada & Evil at Honor Rising 2019: Day 2, starting their fifth reign. On April 6, 2019, G.O.D. won a Winner Take All Fatal Four-Way tag team match at G1 Supercard, successfully defending the IWGP titles and winning the ROH World Tag Team Championship for the first time, making them double champions between NJPW and ROH. They would lose the titles against The Briscoes at Manhattan Mayhem. After defending the IWGP Tag Team Championships another six times, their reign would end when G.O.D lost to FinJuice (Juice Robinson & David Finlay) at Wrestle Kingdom 14. They would soon immediately regain the belts at The New Beginning in the USA event in Atlanta, before again losing them without a defence to Golden*Ace (Hiroshi Tanahashi & Kota Ibushi) on a New Japan Road show in Korakuen Hall.

After the 2020 Pandemic, Guerrillas of Destiny would make their return to Japan as participants of the World Tag League. They would win the tournament for the first time after defeating FinJuice in the finals. They would go on to win an IWGP Tag Team Titles at Wrestle Kingdom 15, defeating champions Dangerous Tekkers (Taichi & Zack Sabre Jr.) after Tanga Loa hit 'Apeshit' (a Sitout Reverse Piledriver) on Taichi after 19 minutes & 18 seconds. They retained the championships against Dangerous Tekkers in a rematch at The New Beginning in Hiroshima. They retained the championships again at Castle Attack, defeating Chaos's Hirooki Goto and Yoshi-Hashi. On June 1, they lost the IWGP Tag Team Championships back to the Dangerous Tekkers at the Road to Dominion.

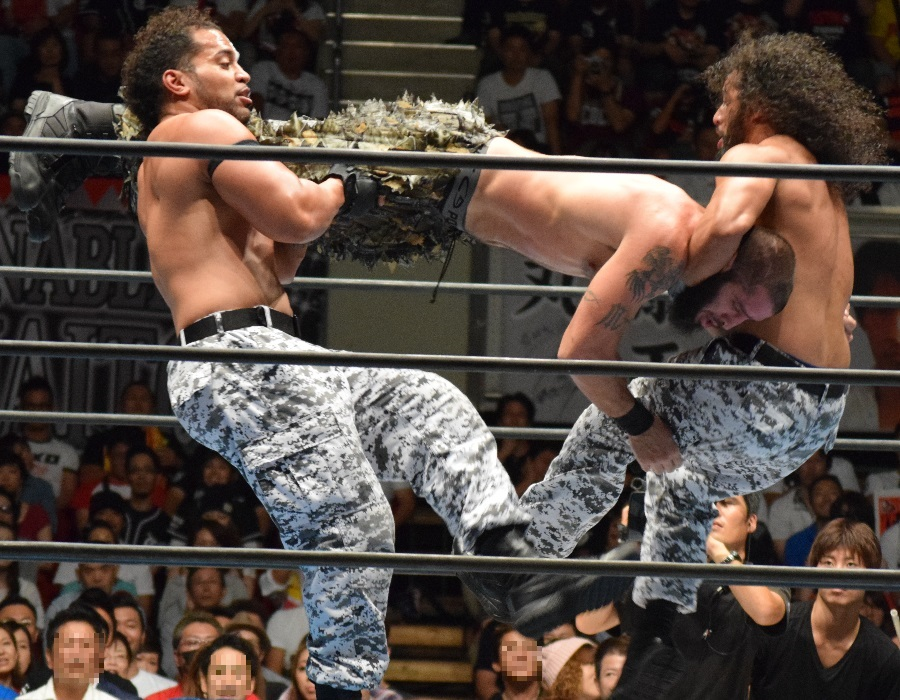
Guerrillas of Destiny performing the Guerrilla Warfare on Mark Briscoe.

Guerrillas of Destiny made a surprise appearance at NJPW Resurgence where they confronted former Bullet Club stablemates The Good Brothers (Karl Anderson and Doc Gallows). They returned to Japan to compete in the World Tag League in November, however, failed to advance to the finals after only scoring 14 points in the tournament.

==== Guerrillas of Destiny stable (2022–2024) ====
Following Guerillas of Destiny's removal from Bullet Club at Impact Wrestling's, No Surrender in February 2022, Tonga and Loa returned to Japan to participate in the New Japan Cup. Both men received bye's to the second round, but Loa was eliminated by Shingo Takagi and Tonga was eliminated by Evil. Following the match, GOD was attacked by the Japanese branch of Bullet Club, confirming their departure, whilst Jado was also expelled by Bullet Club and allied with Tonga and Loa. Following this, Tonga claimed Guerrillas of Destiny would become their own stable, which contained Tonga, Loa and Jado as members. The trio would form an alliance with Ryusuke Taguchi, Master Wato and Hiroshi Tanahashi, turning the trio face for the first time since before joining Bullet Club.

In April, Loa suffered a torn MCL, causing him to be out injured for an undisclosed amount of time. Whilst Loa was out injured, Tama Tonga competed in singles competition, earning quick success by defeated EVIL to win the Never Openweight Championship at Wrestling Dontaku in May, winning his first NJPW singles championship. The following month at Dominion 6.12 in Osaka-jo Hall, Tonga lost the championship to former tag-team partner Karl Anderson. Tonga experienced further success, by topping the B Block during the G1 Climax 32 tournament, by eliminating, IWGP World Heavyweight Champion and former teammate Jay White. Tonga advanced to the tournament semi-finals, but was eliminated by A-Block winner Kazuchika Okada.

In September, Hikuleo joined Guerillas of Destiny, leaving Bullet Club and betraying Jay White by attacking him as he attacked Tama Tonga. Due to being the only man to defeat White in the tournament, as well as ending is G1 campaign, Tonga received an IWGP World Heavyweight Championship match in October at Declaration of Power, but was defeated by White. On January 4 at Wrestle Kingdom 17, Tonga regained the Never Openweight title from Anderson. In February, Hikuleo expelled Jay White from NJPW, defeating him The New Beginning in Osaka. Following a loss to David Finlay in the semi-finals of the New Japan Cup, Tama Tonga lost the Never Openweight Championship to Finlay at Wrestling Dontaku. In May, Hikuleo won is first NJPW title, defeating Kenta Kobayashi to win the Strong Openweight Championship. Hikuleo lost the title back to Kenta just 18 days later at Resurgence.

By July, Loa returned to NJPW, joining his two brothers in the G1 Climax tournament. Whilst Loa and Tonga failed to advance from the B and C Blocks respectively, Hikuleo finished runner-up in the A Block, advancing to the quarter-finals. In the quarter-final round, Hikuleo lost to Tetsuya Naito, eliminating him from the tournament. Following the tournament, GOD invited El Phantasmo, who had similarly been ejected from Bullet Club, to join the stable, which he did on the tournament's final day.

On October 9 at Destruction in Ryogoku, Hikuleo and Phantasmo defeated Bullet Club War Dogs (Alex Coughlin and Gabe Kidd) to win the Strong Openweight Tag Team Championship, making Hikuleo the first wrestler to hold the Strong Openweight singles and tag team titles, while Tonga also defeated Finlay to win the NEVER Openweight Championship for the third time. On October 28 at Fighting Spirit Unleashed, Tonga lost the title to Shingo Takagi in his first title defense. From November 25 until December 6, Hikuleo and Phantasmo took part in the 2023 World Tag League, where they won their block with a record of five wins and two losses, advancing to the semifinals of the tournament. On December 8, Hikuleo and Phantasmo defeated The Mighty Don't Kneel's Mikey Nicholls and Shane Haste in the semifinals and then were defeated by Bishamon (Hirooki Goto and Yoshi-Hashi), on December 10 in the finals of the World Tag League. Following the match, Bishamon challenged Hikuleo and Phantasmo to a match, for both IWGP and the Strong Openweight Tag Team Championships in a Winner Takes All" match.

On January 4, 2024 at Wrestle Kingdom 18, Hikuleo and Phantasmo defeated Bishamon in a Winner takes all match, becoming the new IWGP Tag Team Champions while also defending their Strong Openweight Tag Team Championship. Furthermore, Tonga defeated Takagi to win the NEVER Openweight Championship for the fourth time. In a post-match press conference, Tonga announced he would be leaving NJPW due to his contract expiring. The following day at New Year Dash!!, Chase Owens came forward to challenge Hikuleo and Phantasmo for their titles on behalf of himself and Kenta, which they accepted.

On January 22 at The New Beginning in Nagoya, Phantasmo and Hikuleo successfully defended the Strong Openweight Tag Team Championship against Kenta and Owens, before deciding to give their former Bullet Club teammates a match for the IWGP Tag Team Titles at The New Beginning in Osaka. Following this match, Tonga faced EVIL for the NEVER Openweight Championship. The match originally ended in a no contest, after Tonga was attacked by the House of Torture. The match was restarted into a lumberjack match, where Tonga lost the title to EVIL. Four days later, Tonga wrestled his penultimate match under his NJPW contract, where he, El Desperado, Tomoaki Honma and Yoh defeated House of Torture. Later that night, Tonga helped Shota Umino win his match against Ren Narita, alongside Desperado, following the interference from House of Torture, marking his final regular appearance for the promotion.

At The New Beginning in Osaka on February 11, Hikuleo and Phantasmo lost the IWGP Tag Team Championship to Chase and Kenta. At The New Beginning in Sapporo: Night 2, Hikuleo and Phantasmo defeated Tonga and Loa in Tama's final match with the company. On March 31, at Road to Sakura Genesis, Tanga Loa challenged for the KOPW trophy in a losing effort to Great-O-Khan. This was later revealed to be his final match with the company. Hikuleo would also leave with his contract expiring in 2024, as he wrestled his final match for NJPW at Dominion 6.9 in Osaka-jo Hall, where he and Phantasmo lost the Strong Openweight Tag Team titles in a four-way match Winner Take All match, where Nicholls and Haste claimed both sets of championships. With Hikuleo's departure, G.O.D. was officially disbanded in NJPW.

=== Impact Wrestling (2022) ===
On the January 27, 2022, episode of Impact!, Guerrillas of Destiny made their Impact Wrestling debut attacking Jake Something and Mike Bailey before challenging The Good Brothers to a match at No Surrender for the Impact World Tag Team Championship. At No Surrender, Jay White interfered in G.O.D's match against The Good Brothers, hitting the Blade Runner on Tama Tonga causing them to lose the match. Afterwards, Jay White, Chris Bey, Anderson and Gallows all gave the "Too Sweet" hand gesture in the middle of the ring, signaling that G.O.D. had been traded out of Bullet Club in favor of The Good Brothers.

=== WWE (2024−present) ===
==== The Bloodline (2024–2026) ====
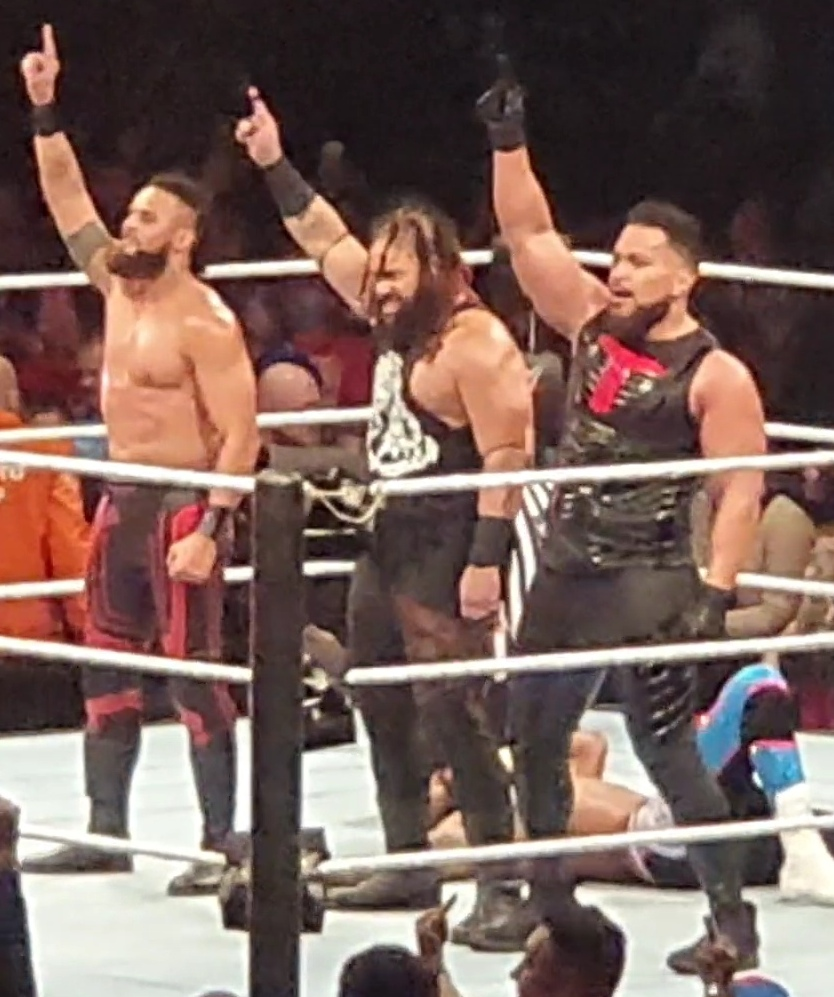
The Tongans with Jacob Fatu in 2024

Tonga made his WWE debut on the April 12 episode of SmackDown as part of The Bloodline stable replacing Jimmy Uso. Tanga Loa (now under the tweaked name "Tonga Loa"), also made his WWE return at the Backlash France event on May 4 helping Tonga and Solo Sikoa win the no disqualification tag team match against Randy Orton and Kevin Owens. Loa previously performed from 2009 to 2014 as Camacho. Tonga and Loa, who are going by the name of The Tongans, made their WWE tag team debut on the May 31 episode of SmackDown, defeating the Street Profits (Angelo Dawkins and Montez Ford). After the addition of Jacob Fatu, Tama Tonga along with Fatu and Sikoa emerged victorious in a six-man tag team match over Cody Rhodes, Randy Orton and Kevin Owens at Money in the Bank.

On the July 26 episode of SmackDown (taped a week prior), The Tongans originally planned to compete in a Tag Team Turmoil match to become Number 1 Contenders for the WWE Tag Team Championship, held by DIY (Tommaso Ciampa and Johnny Gargano). However, due to Loa's eye injury in a previous episode, he was replaced by Jacob Fatu. In the end, Tonga and Fatu emerged victorious after defeating The Street Profits. A week later, Fatu and Tonga defeated DIY to win the WWE Tag Team Championship. This marks Tonga's first title reign in the WWE. On the August 23 episode of SmackDown, Sikoa had Fatu relinquish his half of the title to Loa, making the Tongans an overall ten time tag team champions and getting them their first WWE Tag Team Title. On the October 25 episode of SmackDown, the Tongans lost the titles to the Motor City Machine Guns (Alex Shelley and Chris Sabin) following interference from Roman Reigns and The Usos (Jey and Jimmy), ending their reign at 84 days.

Although Tonga was injured in April 2025, Night of Champions on June 28 saw both Loa's return and the debut of their younger brother, Hikuleo (now under the new name "Talla Tonga"), to help Sikoa win the WWE United States Championship from Fatu, who left a few weeks prior. Sikoa's faction, including The Tongans and former United Empire member Jeff Cobb (who goes by the name of "JC Mateo"), was then named MFT (an acronym for "My Family Tree"); he would later lose the championship to Sami Zayn on the August 29 episode of SmackDown. On the October 10 episode of SmackDown before Crown Jewel: Perth, Tama Tonga returned from injury sporting the face paint he wore during his time in NJPW, and was joined by his brothers and Mateo, as the group attacked Zayn and Shinsuke Nakamura during a United States Championship match which ended in a no contest.

On the November 28 episode of SmackDown (taped one week before), The Tongans alongside with the MFTs defeated Zayn, Nakamura, Motor City Machine Guns, and Rey Fenix in a Survivor Series tag team elimination match where Sikoa was the sole survivor, only to be taken out by The Wyatt Sicks. On the January 9, 2026 episode of SmackDown, Sikoa stole the lantern of Uncle Howdy and held it hostage for multiple weeks, while he and Tama won the WWE Tag Team Championship by defeating Dexter Lumis and Joe Gacy two weeks later. At the Royal Rumble on January 31, Sikoa entered his first Royal Rumble match at No. 3 being eliminated by Oba Femi. On the March 20 episode of SmackDown, Sikoa had JC Mateo defend the tag titles with Tama on his behalf , but the duo would lose the titles to Damian Priest and R-Truth, ending their reign at 56 days. Relations between Sikoa and Tama Tonga began slowly deteriorating following the latter's loss to Uncle Howdy on the April 3 episode when he grabbed the lantern and returned it to Howdy afterwards. Two weeks later on the WrestleMania 42 go home episode of SmackDown on April 17, Sikoa and the MFTs defeated The Wyatt Sicks in an eight-man tag team street fight after Sikoa was given the Samoan Spike to Howdy, ending the months long feud.

==== Return to tag team (2026–present) ====
After Loa was released from WWE on May 2, 2026, leaving The Tongans reduced to a tag team, they renewed a feud with Priest and Truth over the WWE Tag Team Championship. On the June 19, 2026 episode of SmackDown, The Tongans failed to regain the WWE Tag Team Championship from Priest and Truth due to interference from Solo Sikoa. After being pressured by Jacob Fatu to rejoin the revived original Bloodline stable, on the taped June 26, 2026 episode of SmackDown, Tama Tonga and Talla Tonga abandoned Sikoa, thus disbanding the MFT stable.

On the July 31 episode of SmackDown, The Tongans returned, managed by their father, Haku, and reclaimed the MFT name. On the August 14 episode of SmackDown, The MFTs won the WWE Tag Team Championship after defeating The War Raiders (Erik and Ivar) and Damian Priest and R-Truth in a triple threat tag team match.

== Members ==
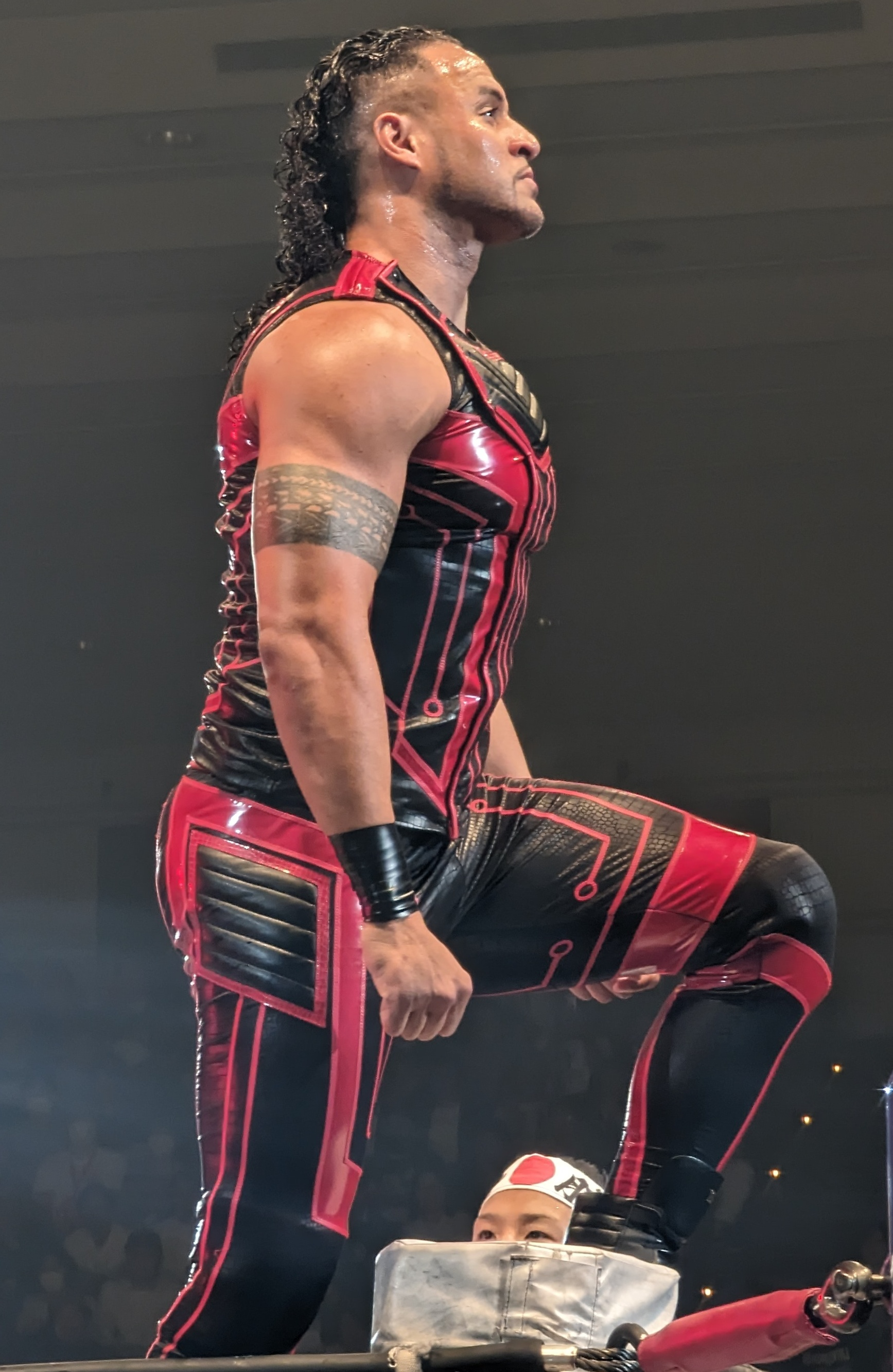
Tama Tonga

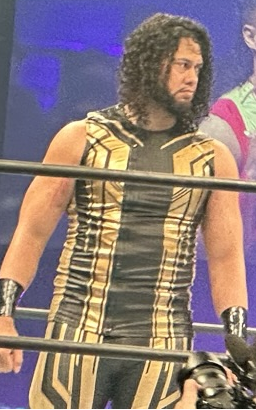
Talla Tonga

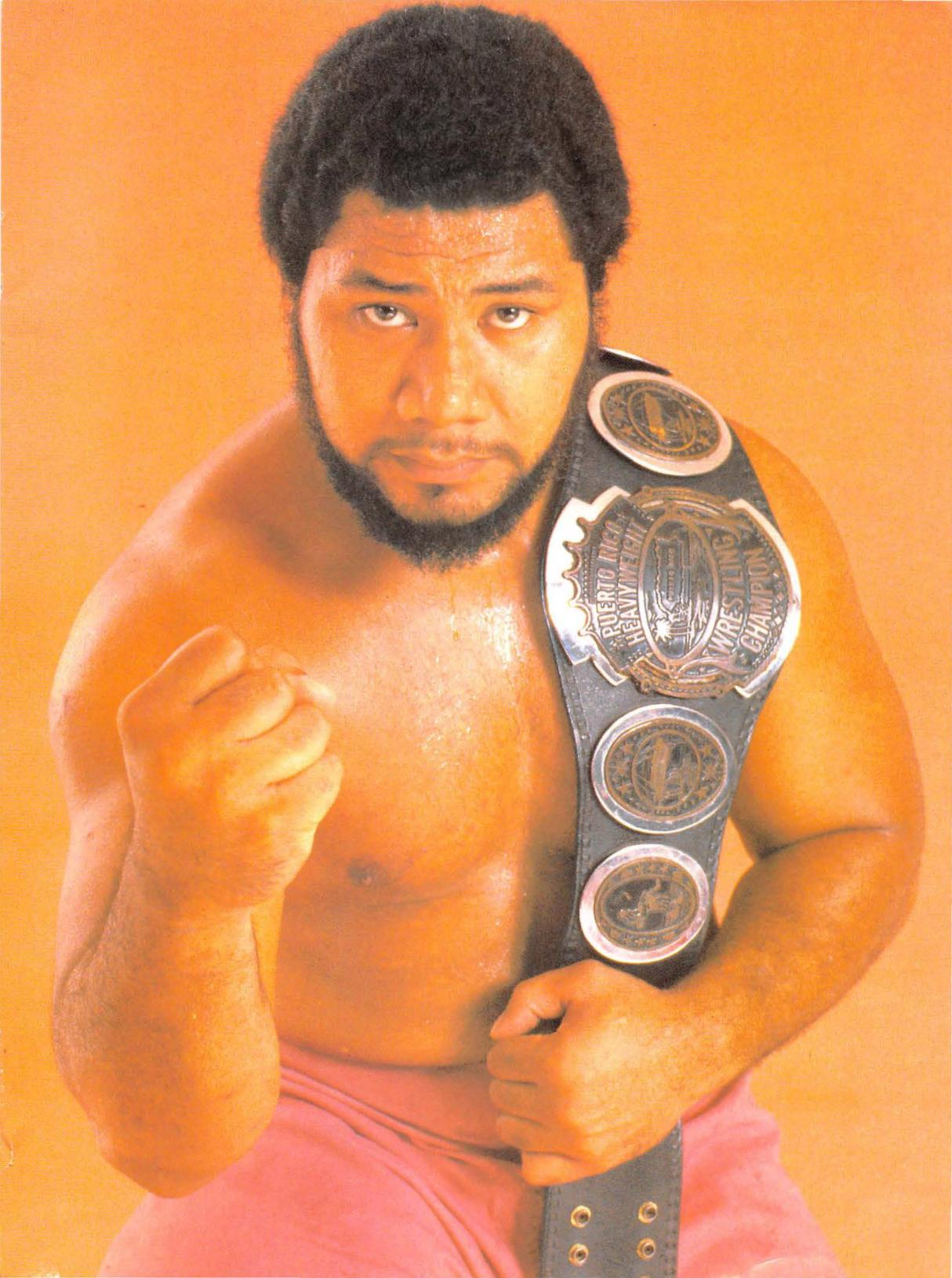
Haku (M)

*	Founding members
M	Manager

Member	Tenure
Tama Tonga*	2008–2009; March 12, 2016–February 24, 2024; May 4, 2024–present
Tanga Loa/Tonga Loa*	2008–2009; March 12, 2016–May 2, 2026 (Note: Loa was officially a member of Guerillas of Destiny until he joined WWE at Backlash France, meaning that he left Guerillas of Destinity to immediately form The Tongans on May 4, 2024)
Hikuleo/Talla Tonga	September 25, 2022–June 9, 2024; June 28, 2025–present
Haku (M)	July 31, 2026–present
Jado (M)	March 12, 2022–June 9, 2024
El Phantasmo	August 13, 2023–June 9, 2024

== Championships and accomplishments ==
- New Japan Pro-Wrestling
  - IWGP Tag Team Championship (8 times) – Tonga and Loa (7) and Hikuleo and Phantasmo (1)
  - NEVER Openweight 6-Man Tag Team Championship (3 times) – Tonga and Loa with Bad Luck Fale (2) and Tonga and Loa with Taiji Ishimori (1)
  - NEVER Openweight Championship (4 times) – Tonga
  - Strong Openweight Championship (1 time) – Hikuleo (1)
  - Strong Openweight Tag Team Championship (2 times) – Hikuleo and Phantasmo
  - World Tag League – Tonga and Loa (2020)
- Pro Wrestling Illustrated
  - Ranked Tonga No. 94 of the top 500 singles wrestlers in the PWI 500 in 2019
  - Ranked Loa No. 97 of the top 500 singles wrestlers in the PWI 500 in 2019
  - Ranked El Phantasmo No. 295 of the top 500 singles wrestlers in the PWI 500 in 2023
  - Ranked Hikuleo No. 350 of the top 500 singles wrestlers in the PWI 500 in 2022
  - Ranked Tonga and Loa No. 6 of the top 50 Tag Teams in the PWI Tag Team 50 in 2020
- Ring of Honor
  - ROH World Tag Team Championship (1 time) – Tonga and Loa
- WrestleCircus
  - WC Big Top Tag Team Championship (1 time) – Tonga and Loa
- WWE
  - WWE Tag Team Championship (2 times, current) – Tonga and Loa (1), Tonga and Talla (1, current)
