= Henare Te Atua =

New Zealand tribal leader

Henare Te Atua (died 1912) was a notable New Zealand tribal leader. Of Māori descent, he identified with the Ngāti Kahungunu iwi.
