= Evil (wrestler) =

Japanese professional wrestler (born 1987)

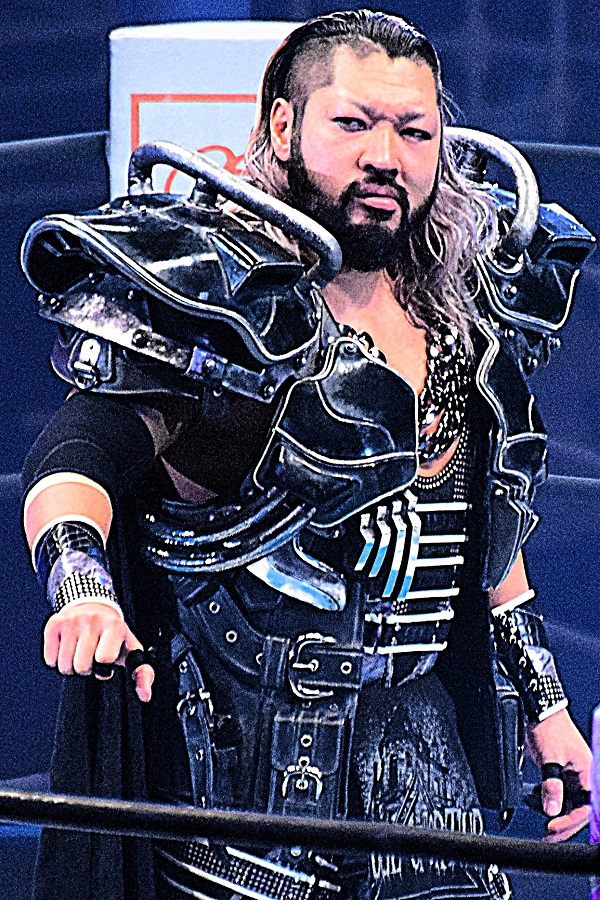
- Watanabe in November 2021

Personal information
- Born: Takaaki Watanabe (渡辺 高章, Watanabe Takaaki); January 26, 1987 (age 39) Mishima, Shizuoka, Japan
- Spouse: Iyo Sky (m. 2026)

Professional wrestling career
- Ring name(s): Evil; Naraku; Takaaki Watanabe
- Billed height: 1.78 m (5 ft 10 in)
- Billed weight: 106 kg (234 lb)
- Billed from: Mishima, Shizuoka, Japan
- Trained by: Animal Hamaguchi; Hiroyoshi Tenzan; Jado; NJPW Dojo; Ryusuke Taguchi
- Debut: May 13, 2011

Takaaki Watanabe (渡辺 高章, Watanabe Takaaki; born January 26, 1987) is a Japanese professional wrestler. He is signed to WWE, where he performs on the NXT brand under the ring name Naraku (奈落, Naraku). He is best known for his tenure in New Japan Pro-Wrestling (NJPW), where he performed under the ring name Evil (stylized in all caps as EVIL).

After debuting in NJPW in 2011, he competed in the United States on excursion, working for companies such as Global Force Wrestling (GFW) and Ring of Honor (ROH) from 2014 to 2015. He returned to NJPW as Evil in November 2015. He was a former member of Los Ingobernables de Japón, and a part of a tag team with Sanada; they are two-time IWGP Tag Team Champions and two-time World Tag League winners. He is also a record-breaking six-time NEVER Openweight 6-Man Tag Team Champion, making him an overall ten-time champion in NJPW. In 2020, he won the New Japan Cup, before turning on L.I.J leader Tetsuya Naito and joining Bullet Club. He defeated Naito at Dominion to become the double IWGP Heavyweight and Intercontinental Champion. He is the only wrestler in NJPW history to be a triple champion, having held the IWGP Heavyweight and Intercontinental Championships and the NEVER Openweight 6-Man Tag Team Championship simultaneously from July to August 2020. He departed NJPW in January 2026 and signed with WWE that April under the new name Naraku.

== Professional wrestling career ==
=== New Japan Pro-Wrestling (2011–2026) ===
==== Young Lion and foreign excursion (2011–2015) ====
Watanabe made his debut for New Japan Pro-Wrestling (NJPW) on May 13, 2011, wrestling primarily as a Young Lion and in the lower cards of shows and remained with the promotion until October 2013, when after King of Pro-Wrestling, announced that he was being sent on a learning excursion to the United States.

==== The King of Darkness (2015–2017) ====
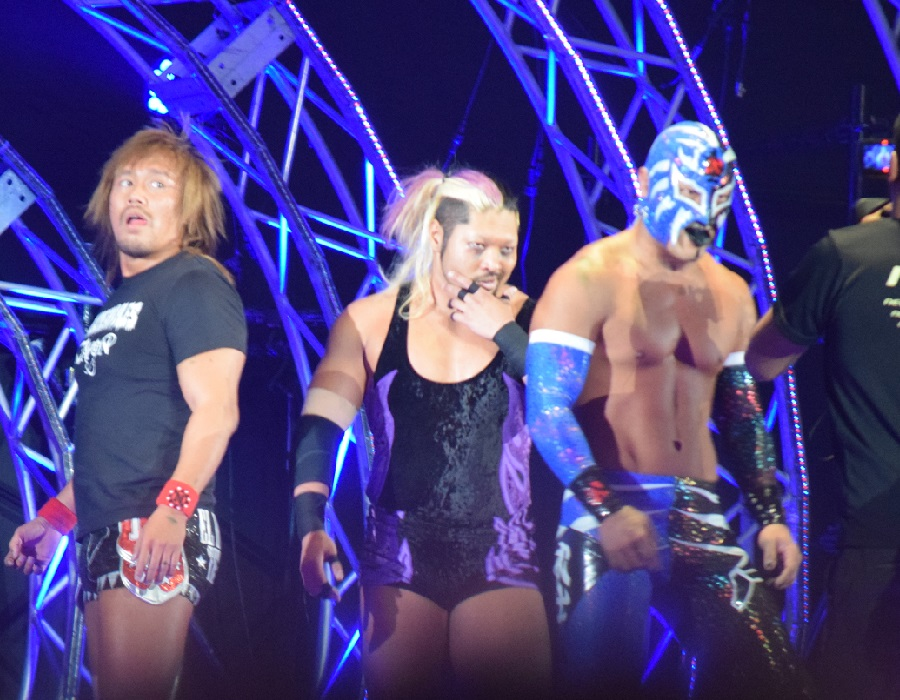
Evil (middle) with Los Ingobernables de Japón in February 2016

On October 12, 2015, Watanabe returned to NJPW at King of Pro-Wrestling, where he was revealed as Tetsuya Naito's associate during his match against Hiroshi Tanahashi. Watanabe's outside interference in the match was stopped by Hirooki Goto and Katsuyori Shibata, leading to Naito suffering a loss. In a post-match interview, Naito gave Watanabe the new name "King of Darkness" Evil. Under the new name, Evil became affiliated with Naito's Los Ingobernables de Japón stable. In December, Evil and Naito won their block in the World Tag League with a record of five wins and one loss, advancing to the finals of the tournament. On December 9, Evil and Naito were defeated in the finals by Togi Makabe and Tomoaki Honma.

In early March 2016, Evil took part in the New Japan Cup in which he was eliminated in the first round by Tomohiro Ishii. On March 20, Evil unsuccessfully challenged Ishii for the ROH World Television Championship. From July 18 to August 14, Evil took part in the G1 Climax, where he finished his block with four wins and five losses, thus failing to advance. Despite his failure to advance, Evil scored two big wins by defeating Michael Elgin (then-IWGP Intercontinental Champion) and Shibata (then-NEVER Openweight Champion) on the last day.

On November 5 at Power Struggle, Evil won his first title, when he defeated Shibata for the NEVER Openweight Championship. Ten days later, Evil lost the title back to Shibata in Singapore. At the end of the year, Evil took part in the World Tag League, teaming with stablemate Sanada. The two finished second in their block with a record of five wins and two losses, tied with block winners Makabe and Honma, but failed to advance to the finals due to losing the head-to-head match against Makabe and Honma.

On January 4, 2017, at Wrestle Kingdom 11, Evil, Bushi and Sanada won a four-team gauntlet match to become the new NEVER Openweight 6-Man Tag Team Champions. They lost the title to Tanahashi, Manabu Nakanishi and Ryusuke Taguchi the next day, before regaining it on February 11 at The New Beginning in Osaka. In March, Evil made it to the semifinals of the New Japan Cup, before losing to Bad Luck Fale. On April 4, L.I.J. lost the NEVER Openweight 6-Man Tag Team Championship to Tanahashi, Taguchi and Ricochet in their second defense, before regaining it on May 3 at Wrestling Dontaku 2017.

On August 5, during the G1 Climax, Evil picked up a major win over reigning IWGP Heavyweight Champion Kazuchika Okada, which was Okada's first singles defeat in nearly a year. Evil went on to finish third in his block with a record of six wins and three losses. On October 9 at King of Pro-Wrestling, Evil received his first shot at the IWGP Heavyweight Championship, but was defeated by Okada. In December, Evil and Sanada won their block in the World Tag League with a record of five wins and two losses, advancing to the finals of the tournament. On December 11, they defeated Guerrillas of Destiny (Tama Tonga and Tanga Loa) in the finals to win the tournament. Six days later, Evil, Bushi and Sanada lost the NEVER Openweight 6-Man Tag Team Championship to Guerrillas of Destiny and Bad Luck Fale in their fourth defense.

==== Championship reigns with Sanada (2018–2020) ====
On January 4, 2018, at Wrestle Kingdom 12, Evil and Sanada defeated the Killer Elite Squad (Davey Boy Smith Jr. and Lance Archer) to win the IWGP Tag Team Championship for the first time. Evil and Sanada would successfully defend the IWGP Tag Team Championship on two occasions before losing the title to The Young Bucks (Matt Jackson and Nick Jackson) at Dominion 6.9 in Osaka-jo Hall ending their reign at 156 days. The same night, Chris Jericho defeated Tetsuya Naito to win the IWGP Intercontinental Championship. After the match, Jericho put Naito into Walls of Jericho and refused to release the hold. This resulted in Evil running in to make the save. Evil entered the G1 Climax and finished with a record of five wins and four losses, failing to advance from his block. At King of Pro-Wrestling, Evil was scheduled to compete in a singles match against Zack Sabre Jr. However, before the match could begin, Jericho would return and attack Evil, forcing the match to be a no contest.

On November 3, 2018, at Power Struggle, Evil challenged Jericho for the IWGP Intercontinental Championship. Evil was unsuccessful, however, and was forced to submit to Jericho's Liontamer submission hold. In December, Evil and Sanada entered the World Tag League. The pair scored a record of ten wins and three losses, advancing them to the finals where they would meet the Guerrillas of Destiny (Tama Tonga and Tanga Loa) in a rematch of the previous year's final. On December 9, they defeated the Guerillas of Destiny in the finals to win their second World Tag League and the challenge right for an IWGP Tag Team Championship match at Wrestle Kingdom 13.

On January 4, 2019, At Wrestle Kingdom 13, Evil and Sanada won IWGP Tag Team Championship in a three-way tag team match, that also included Guerillas of Destiny and the Young Bucks. They retained their titles at The New Beginning in Sapporo against Sabre and Minoru Suzuki. At Honor Rising: Japan 2019, Evil and Sanada lost the titles in their second defense against Guerillas of Destiny. Evil was announced to take part in the New Japan Cup, but lost to Sabre in the first round. Evil entered the G1 Climax, finishing with a record of four wins and five losses, failing to make it to the finals.

On January 5, 2020, at Wrestle Kingdom 14, Evil, Bushi and Shingo Takagi defeated four other teams in a Gauntlet match for the NEVER Openweight 6-Man Tag Team Championship, making both Evil and Bushi record-tying four time holders of the title.

==== Bullet Club and IWGP Heavyweight Champion (2020–2021) ====
After New Japan Pro-Wrestling underwent a hiatus in late February 2020 due to the COVID-19 pandemic, the company resumed its activities with the New Japan Cup, which begun on June 16, with the winner receiving a title shot against Tetsuya Naito for both the IWGP Heavyweight and IWGP Intercontinental Championship. Entering the tournament, Evil defeated Satoshi Kojima, Hirooki Goto, Yoshi-Hashi, and his stablemate Sanada to reach the finals, displaying a more aggressive attitude, notably cheating by low blowing Goto in their match, injuring Yoshi-Hashi before their match, and using a chair to attack Sanada's neck in their match. In the finals on July 11, Evil defeated Kazuchika Okada, in part due to interference by Bullet Club, who attacked Okada seemingly behind Evil's back (as he appeared unconscious when it happened). When Naito came out to congratulate him on his win, Evil threw up the "too sweet" symbol of Bullet Club instead of the raised fist of Los Ingobernables, then attacked Naito, turning heel, and was soon joined by Bullet Club, establishing himself as a member of the stable and the first person to ever leave Los Ingobernables de Japón.

At Dominion the following day, Evil defeated Naito to capture both the IWGP Heavyweight and IWGP Intercontinental Championship with the help of Bullet Club, including Dick Togo, who joined the stable and became Evil's manager in the process. As Evil was still NEVER Openweight 6-Man Tag Team Champion with Bushi and Takagi despite his betrayal, he became the first triple champion in the history of New Japan Pro-Wrestling. On July 25, At Sengoku Lord, he had his first successful defense of both the Heavyweight and Intercontinental titles against former Ingobernables stablemate Hiromu Takahashi. On August 1, NJPW vacated the NEVER Openweight 6-Man Tag Team Championship, due to Evil claiming in a post-Dominion interview that he had "no interest" in defending the title with his former Ingobernables stablemates, ending his run as triple champion. He lost both titles to Naito at Summer Struggle in Jingu.

==== House of Torture (2021–2026) ====
On September 4, 2021, at Wrestle Grand Slam in MetLife Dome, Evil, alongside Togo and Yujiro Takahashi, welcomed Sho to Bullet Club, forming a sub-unit called House of Torture. The following night Evil unsuccessfully faced Shingo Takagi for the IWGP World Heavyweight Championship. On November 6, at Power Struggle, Evil, Sho and Takahashi defeated Chaos to win the NEVER Openweight 6-Man Tag Team Championship. On night one of Wrestle Kingdom 16, Evil defeated Tomohiro Ishii to win the NEVER Openweight Championship, becoming a double champion. On night two, HoT once again retained the NEVER Openweight 6-Man Tag Team Championship against Chaos. On night three, Evil and Dick Togo lost to Pro Wrestling Noah's Go Shiozaki and Masa Kitamiya.

At the NJPW New Years Golden Series tour, Evil retained the NEVER Openweight Championship against Ishii once again and retained the NEVER Openweight 6-Man Tag Team Championship. Evil then entered the New Japan Cup; he defeated Ryusuke Taguchi and Tama Tonga in rounds one and two, but lost to Hiromu Takahashi in round three. At Hyper Battle, Evil retained the NEVER Openweight Championship against Takahashi. At Wrestling Dontaku, Evil lost the NEVER Openweight Championship to Tonga, ending his second reign at 117 days. At Dominion 6.12 in Osaka-jo Hall, HoT retained the NEVER Openweight 6-Man Tag Team Championship against Suzuki-gun, but lost them to Chaos at New Japan Road. In June, Evil was announced to be competing at G1 Climax 32, in the C Block. He finished the tournament with six points, failing to advance to the semi-finals.

In October, Evil participated in a tournament to crown the first ever NJPW World Television Champion. He defeated Aaron Henare and Yoshi-Hashi to advance to the tournament's semi-finals. In the semi-final round, Evil lost to eventual winner Zack Sabre Jr. At Battle Autumn, HoT retained their NEVER Openweight 6-Man Tag Team Championship against Hiroshi Tanahashi, Ryusuke Taguchi and Hikuleo. In November, Evil once again teamed with Yujiro Takahashi in the World Tag League. The duo ended their tournament with six points, failing to advance to the finals.

On January 4, 2023, at Wrestle Kingdom 17, Evil competed in the New Japan Ranbo match, but failed to last until the final four. The following day at New Year Dash, Evil, Takahashi and Togo defeated Tomoaki Honma, Tiger Mask and Ren Narita. After the match, HoT attacked Narita, but he was saved by Minoru Suzuki and El Desperado, causing the sub-group to flee. This confrontation led to a match between the teams for the NEVER Openweight Six-Man Tag Team Championship, which Suzuki, Desperado and Narita won.

In March, Evil participated in the New Japan Cup, defeating Narita and Jeff Cobb, in the first two rounds. In the quarterfinals, Evil lost to Mark Davis, eliminating him from the tournament. In June at Dominion 6.4 in Osaka-jo Hall, Evil teamed with Takahashi in a three-way tag-team match for both the vacant IWGP Tag Team Championship and the Strong Openweight Tag Team Championship, but the match was won by Bishamon (Hirooki Goto and Yoshi-Hashi). The following month in July, Evil was announced to be competing at G1 Climax 33, competing in the C Block. Evil finished with a total of ten points, finishing joint top of his block, thus advancing to the quarterfinal round. In the quarterfinals, Evil defeated reigning IWGP World Heavyweight Champion Sanada, to advance to the semi-finals. Evil lost to Kazuchika Okada in the semi-finals, eliminating him from the tournament.

Shortly after, Evil and HoT embarked on a feud with Shota Umino and Kaito Kiyomiya, leading to two matches, with the first being on January 2, 2024 at Noah The New Year, where HoT lost and the second two days later at Wrestle Kingdom 18, where Evil and Narita, HoT's newest member, got their revenge and defeated Umino and Kiyomiya, ending their feud. Later that night, as Tetsuya Naito was going to close the show, Evil and HoT tried to ruin his moment, after attacking Naito, only to be saved by Sanada. Three days later at New Year Dash!!, during a post-match interview, Evil attacked Tama Tonga and made the challenge for his title, but also humiliated the newly crowned champion as he cut off some of his hair. On January 10, Tonga's profile was erroneously erased from the NJPW profile page, and Evil was incorrectly listed as the NEVER Openweight Champion, after it was discovered by video evidence that Evil had forced NJPW staff to those modifications. On January 22 at The New Beginning in Nagoya, Evil faced Tonga for the NEVER Openweight Championship. The match originally ended in a no contest, after Tonga was attacked by HoT. The match was restarted into a Lumberjack Deathmatch, where Evil defeated Tonga to win the NEVER Openweight Championship for the third time. At Sakura Genesis, Evil lost the NEVER Openweight Championship to Shingo Takagi, ending his third reign at 77 days. At Resurgence, Evil attacked IWGP World Heavyweight Champion Jon Moxley and declared himself to be Moxley's next challenger. At Dominion 6.9 in Osaka-jo Hall, Evil failed to win the title from Moxley. Heading into Wrestle Kingdom 19, Evil began a feud with Hiroshi Tanahashi, which ended with Evil losing to Tanahashi at the event.

On February 1, 2025, it was reported that Evil's contract with NJPW expired. On February 11 at The New Beginning in Osaka, Evil returned after a brief hiatus, where he and the rest of HoT attacked Yota Tsuji and Gabe Kidd after their match. He then proceeded to kick Kidd and the rest of the War Dogs out of Bullet Club, despite not having leadership in the main stable and starting a civil war between the two sub-groups. On April 4 at Sakura Genesis, Evil unsuccessfully challenged Tsuji for the IWGP Global Heavyweight Championship. In a post-match interview, David Finlay. alongside the War Dogs (Kidd, Drilla Moloney, Clark Connors and Taiji Ishimori) challenged House of Torture (Evil, Narita, Sho, Yoshinobu Kanemaru and Sanada) to a Dog Pound match, with the stipulation that the losers must leave Bullet Club. On May 3, at night one of Wrestling Dontaku, the War Dogs defeated House of Torture, thus HoT were forced to leave Bullet Club. On October 13 at King of Pro-Wrestling, Evil defeated Oleg Boltin to become a 4-time NEVER Openweight Champion.

On January 4, 2026 at Wrestle Kingdom 20, Evil lost the title to the debuting Aaron Wolf, ending his fourth reign at 83 days . On January 20, Evil and his stablemates were defeated by Wolf, Toru Yano and Spiritech (Master Wato and Yoh). This would be Evil's final match in NJPW as five days later, it was announced that Evil would not be renewing his contract and would be leaving the promotion after fifteen years.

=== Ring of Honor (2014–2015) ===
On May 15, 2015, at the first night of Global Wars '15, he teamed with Silas Young in a losing effort against Gedo and Moose. The following night, he was defeated by Young.

On the June 27 episode of ROH Wrestling, he lost to Adam Page after Colby Corino attacked Watanabe. On the July 4 episode of ROH Wrestling, Dalton Castle would defeat Watanabe. On July 23, ROH announced that House of Truth member Donovan Dijak would battle Watanabe in a singles match taped exclusively for ROH's YouTube channel. This occurred on July 24 at Death Before Dishonor XIII, where Dijak defeated Watanabe.

August 22 at Field of Honor, Watanabe qualified for an ROH World Television Championship match by winning a nine-man gauntlet match. On September 18 at All Star Extravaganza VII, he teamed with Will Ferrara to defeat Dijak and Greg James. On September 19, Watanabe received his shot at the Television Title in a match against champion Jay Lethal, but was unsuccessful.

=== WWE (2026–present) ===
In April 2026, PWInsider reported that Watanabe had signed with WWE. He made his debut on the April 28, 2026 episode of NXT, confronting the NXT Champion Tony D’Angelo and adopted the new name Naraku soon after. Naraku made his in-ring debut on the May 12 episode of NXT, defeating Lince Dorado. On the June 9 episode of NXT, Naraku defeated Mason Rook to become the number one contender for the NXT Championship. Naraku subsequently challenged Tony D'Angelo for the title on two occasions, but was unsuccessful both times: first at The Great American Bash on June 28, and then on the July 2 episode of NXT in a Street Fight. Following his defeat to D'Angelo, Naraku began a feud with Shiloh Hill after costing him an NXT North American Championship match. At Halloween Havoc on October 31, Naraku was defeated by Hill.

== Personal life ==
Watanabe is married to professional wrestler Masami Odate, also known by her ring name of Iyo Sky.

== Championships and accomplishments ==
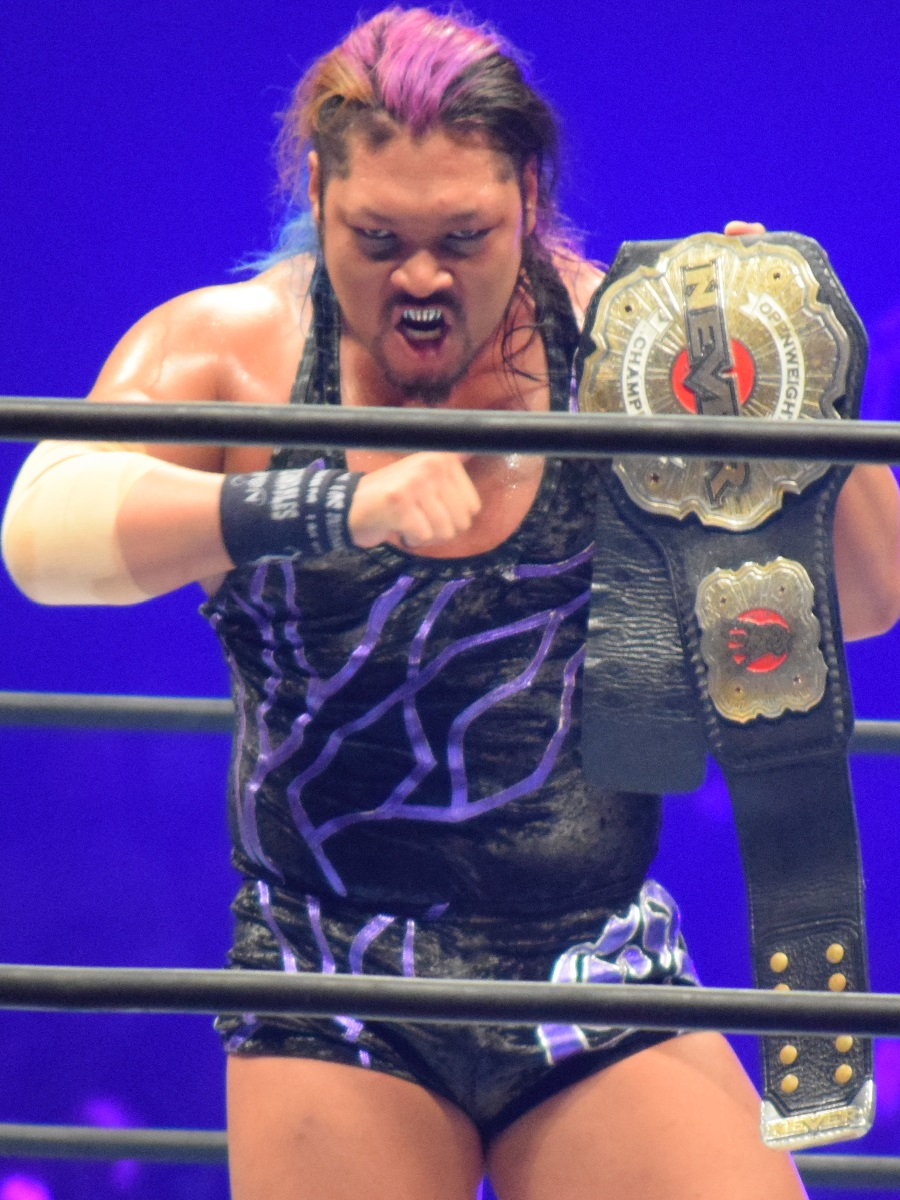
Evil is a four-time NEVER Openweight Champion

- New Japan Pro-Wrestling
  - IWGP Heavyweight Championship (1 time)
  - IWGP Intercontinental Championship (1 time)
  - NEVER Openweight Championship (4 times)
  - IWGP Tag Team Championship (2 times) – with Sanada
  - NEVER Openweight 6-Man Tag Team Championship (6 times) – with Bushi and Sanada (3), Bushi and Shingo Takagi (1), Yujiro Takahashi and Sho (2)
  - Second NJPW Triple Crown Champion
  - New Japan Cup (2020)
  - World Tag League (2017, 2018) – with Sanada
- Pro Wrestling Illustrated
  - Ranked No. 29 of the top 500 singles wrestlers in the PWI 500 in 2021
- Wrestling Observer Newsletter
  - Best Gimmick (2017) as part of Los Ingobernables de Japón
  - Most Overrated (2021)
