= Yuya Uemura =

Japanese professional wrestler (born 1994)

- Uemura in August 2026

Personal information
- Born: November 18, 1994 (age 31) Imabari, Ehime, Japan
- Education: Fukuoka University

Professional wrestling career
- Ring name: Yuya Uemura
- Billed height: 5 ft 11 in (180 cm)
- Billed weight: 223 lb (101 kg)
- Trained by: Katsuyori Shibata; NJPW Dojo; NJPW LA Dojo; Tiger Mask IV; Yuji Nagata
- Debut: April 10, 2018

Yuya Uemura (上村優也, Uemura Yūya; November 18, 1994) is a Japanese professional wrestler. He is signed to New Japan Pro-Wrestling (NJPW), where he is a former one-time KOPW Champion. He has also made appearances for Impact Wrestling (TNA), All Elite Wrestling (AEW) and Game Changer Wrestling (GCW).

== Early life ==
In March 2013, Uemura graduated from Imabari Technical High School. He wrestled collegiately before he started his professional wrestling career. In October 2016, he won the West Japan Collegiate Wrestling League's 71 kg Greco-Roman championship. In March 2017, Uemura graduated from Fukuoka University.

== Professional wrestling career ==
=== New Japan Pro-Wrestling (2017–present) ===
==== Young lion and United States excursion (2017–2023) ====
In April 2017, after graduating from Fukuoka University, Uemura was signed to New Japan Pro-Wrestling under New Japan's "young lion" system. A year later, in April 2018, Uemura as well as fellow young lion, Yota Tsuji, made their pro-wrestling debuts at Lion's Gate Project 11 where Uemura was defeated by Ren Narita. On day one of Road to Wrestling Dontaku 2018, Uemura was defeated by Tetsuhiro Yagi. On day six, he was defeated by Tomoyuki Oka. On day eight, Uemura was defeated by Rocky Romero. On day 14, Uemura and Yuji Nagata were defeated by Oka and Shota Umino. On night two of Wrestling Dontaku 2018, Uemura teamed with Narita and Umino and were defeated by the team of veterans, Tiger Mask, Jushin Thunder Liger and Ryusuke Taguchi. At New Japan Road 2018, Uemura and Yota Tsuji wrestled to a time-limit draw.

At Lion's Gate Project 12, Uemura and Tsuji once again wrestled to a time-limit draw. On day 6 of Best of the Super Juniors XXV, Uemura, Tsuji and Flip Gordon were defeated by Umino, Tiger Mask and Oka. On day 11, Uemura and Dragon Lee were defeated by Umino and Kushida. On day 12, Uemura, ACH and Tsuji were defeated by Umino, Oka and Tiger Mask. Throughout Kizuna Road 2018, Tsuji and Uemura wrestled to time-limit draws. On September 8, Uemura teamed with Shota to defeat Tsuji and Ren Narita to win his first match. In October 2019, Uemura teamed with Tiger Mask as part of the Super Junior Tag Tournament where they came in last place with zero points. Uemura competed in the 2020 New Japan Cup for the first time being eliminated by Yoshinobu Kanemaru in the first round. In November 2020, he entered the Best of the Super Juniors tournament. He finished the tournament with 0 wins and 9 losses, failing to advance to the finals.

In 2022, Uemura travelled to the United States as part of his learning excursion. There, he began competing for All Elite Wrestling, Impact Wrestling and Game Changer Wrestling.

==== Just 5 Guys / Just 4 Guys (2023–2025) ====
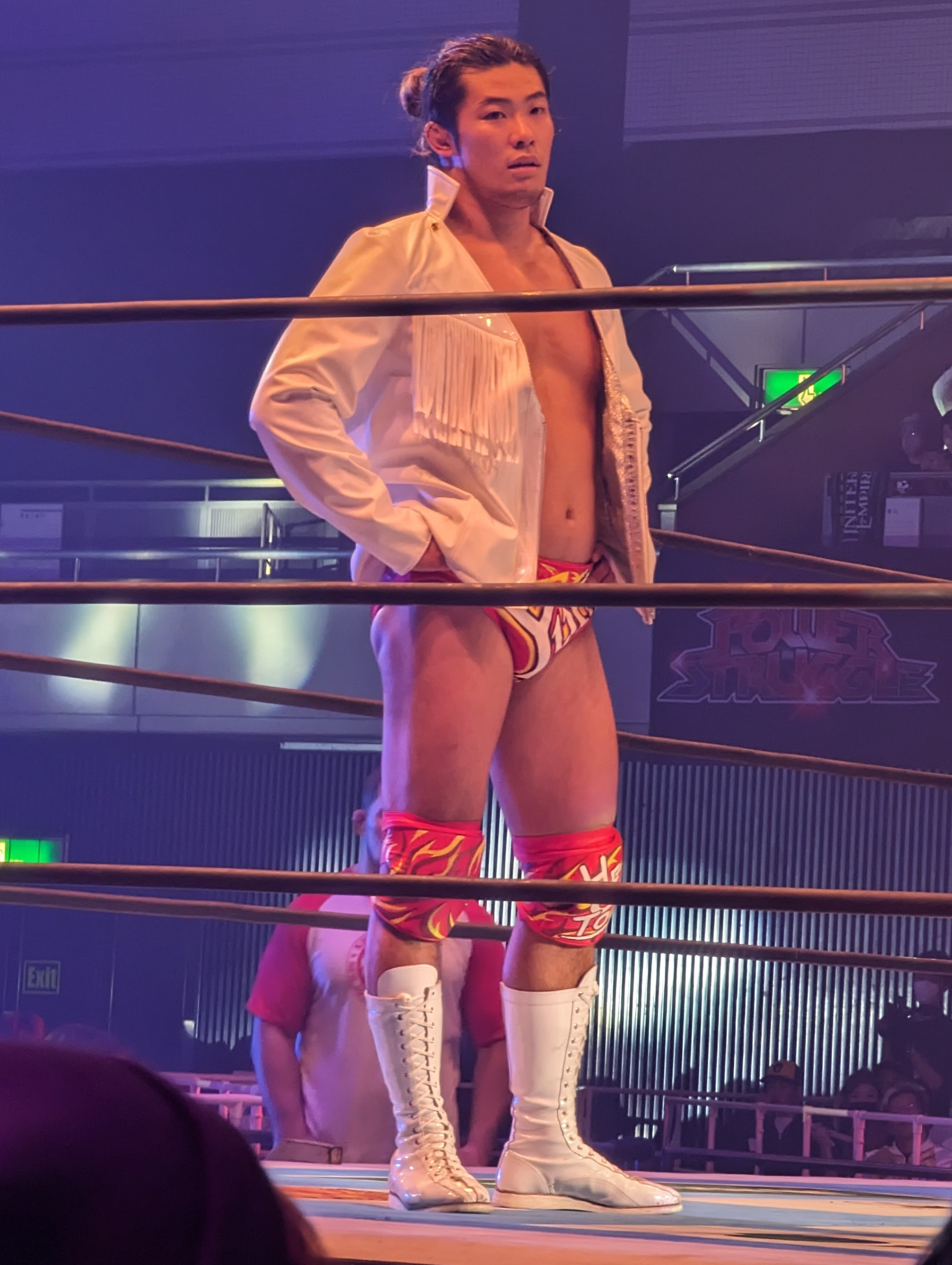
Uemura in November 2023

On October 9, 2023, at Destruction, Uemura made his return to NJPW, teaming with Taichi and Douki against House of Torture, thus becoming the newest member of Just 5 Guys. In November later that year, Uemura teamed with Taichi, in the World Tag League. The duo finished the tournament with 8 points, failing to advance to the semi-finals. Following the tournament's conclusion, Uemura began a feud with former Young Lion Dojo stablemate Yota Tsuji, who had also returned from his excursion and had since joined Los Ingobernables de Japon. The feud began when Uemura pinned Tsuji in a tag-team match. Due to this a singles match between the two men was set for Wrestle Kingdom 18. On January 4, 2024, at Wrestle Kingdom, Uemura defeated Tsuji. On February 24 at The New Beginning in Sapporo, Uemura was defeated by Tsuji in a Hair vs. Hair match. Uemura then participated in his first G1 Climax tournament, where he was placed in B-block. However, Uemura suffered an injury during the tournament, forcing him to withdraw.

On February 11, 2025, at The New Beginning in Osaka, Uemura returned from injury, coming to the aid of Taichi from an attack by former Just 5 Guys member Sanada. Uemura would go on to defeat Sanada twice, first time in the New Japan Cup in March and second time at Sakura Genesis in April.

==== Singles competition (2025–present) ====
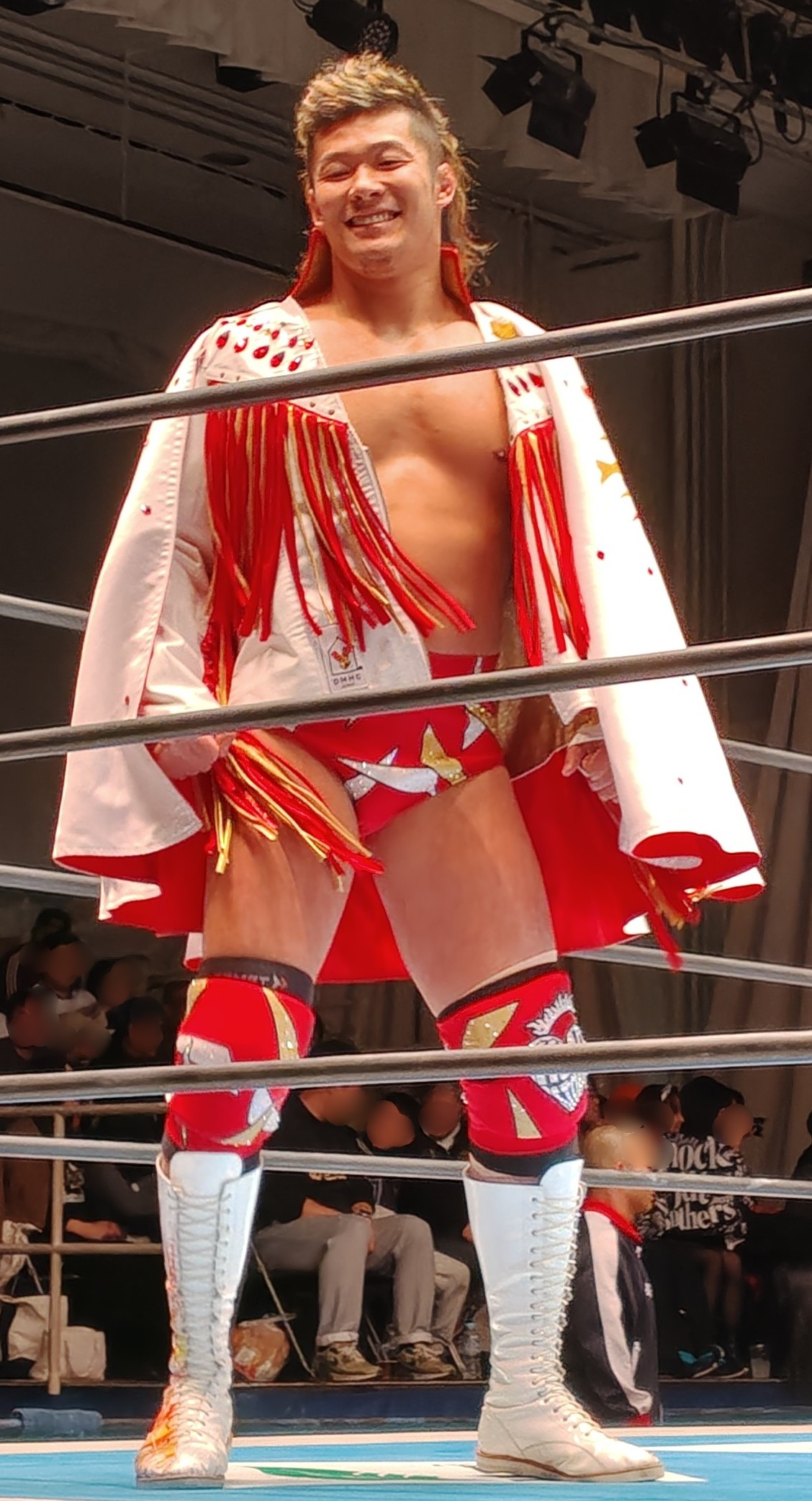
Uemura in January 2026

At Dominion 6.15 in Osaka-jo Hall, Uemura was defeated by Hiroshi Tanahashi. In his post-match comments, Uemura and Taichi announced that Just 4 Guys would be disbanding after Douki joined House of Torture that same night. From July to August in the G1 Climax, Uemura was placed in A-block, where he finished with 10 points but would not make it to the playoff stage due to losing the tiebreaker to Yota Tsuji. In November 2025, Uemura formed a tag team with Shota Umino and the duo entered the 2025 World Tag League, where they were placed in A-Block. The duo finished the tournament with 8 points and failed to advance to the playoff stage.

In March 2026, Uemura competed in New Japan Cup and made it to the grand finals, but lost to Callum Newman. From July 11 till August 16, Uemura participated in G1 Climax (B block) and finished with 12 points (6–3) to qualify for the semis; he went on to defeat the reigning IWGP Heavyweight Champion Yota Tsuji in the semifinals before losing to Ryohei Oiwa.

=== Impact Wrestling (2022–2023) ===
In August 2022, Uemura defeated Kenny King in his Impact Wrestling debut. After being assaulted by Bully Ray and his enforcers, The Good Hands, in March 2023, Uemura joined forces with Tommy Dreamer and went on to defeat Team Bully as part of Team Dreamer at Rebellion.

Uemura teamed with Joe Hendry briefly in August as JOYA, complete with a new team theme and entrance akin to Hendry's. He would later reflect in an NJPW website interview how the pairing "broadened [his] horizons" about how wrestling can be presented in different ways. On the September 14, 2023 episode of Impact, Uemura competed in a Feast or Fired match, where he secured one of the four briefcases. The following week's episode revealed that he had the briefcase containing a pink slip, meaning he was fired.

== Championships and accomplishments ==
=== Collegiate wrestling ===
- West Japan Collegiate Wrestling League
  - 71 kg Greco-Roman championship (2016)

=== Professional wrestling ===
- Impact Wrestling
  - Feast or Fired (2023 – Pink Slip)
- New Japan Pro Wrestling
  - Provisional KOPW Championship (1 time)
- Pro Wrestling Illustrated
  - Ranked No. 97 of the top 500 singles wrestlers in the PWI 500 in 2026

== Luchas de Apuestas record ==
Winner (wager)	Loser (wager)	Location	Event	Date	Notes
Yota Tsuji (hair)	Yuya Uemura (hair)	Sapporo, Japan	The New Beginning in Sapporo: Night 2	February 24, 2024	
