= Henare (wrestler) =

New Zealand professional wrestler (born 1992)

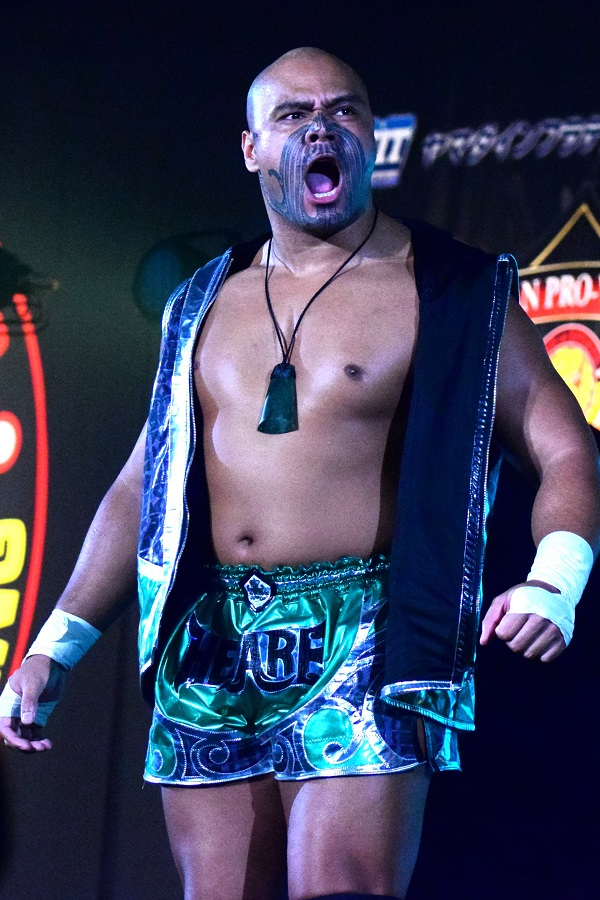
- Henare in 2023

Personal information
- Born: Aaron Henry; 5 August 1992 (age 34) Auckland, New Zealand

Professional wrestling career
- Ring names: A-Class; Aaron Henare; Aaron Henry; Henare; Toa Henare
- Billed height: 180 cm (5 ft 11 in)
- Billed weight: 115 kg (254 lb)
- Trained by: Bad Luck Fale; Hiroshi Tanahashi; NJPW Dojo; Togi Makabe; Warrior Wrestling Academy
- Debut: 2008

Aaron Henry (born 5 August 1992), better known by his ring name Henare (Note: Shortened from his previous ring names Aaron Henare (アーロン・ヘナーレ, Āron Henāre) and Toa Henare (トーア・ヘナーレ, Tōa Henāre).) (stylised in all caps), is a New Zealand professional wrestler. He is signed to New Japan Pro-Wrestling (NJPW), where he is a member of United Empire. He also makes appearances for All Elite Wrestling (AEW). He is the only full-time contracted professional wrestler of Māori descent in a major wrestling promotion to date.

He began his professional career in 2008 on the New Zealand independent scene before signing with New Japan Pro-Wrestling (NJPW) in 2016 as a young lion. He would join the United Empire in 2021 and would become a one-time NEVER Openweight Champion, a one-time NEVER Openweight 6-Man Tag Team Champions, and a two-time IWGP Tag Team Champion.

== Early life ==
Aaron Henry was born in Auckland, New Zealand. He is of Cook Islander Māori descent, with roots from Ngāpuhi and Ngāi Takoto Iwi. His uncle is former professional rugby league player Richie Barnett, who captained New Zealand at the 2000 Rugby League World Cup.

Prior to training in professional wrestling, Henry was an accomplished amateur wrestler, winning national championships in freestyle, Greco-Roman and submission wrestling in the 96 kg weight category. He was offered a spot on the New Zealand Commonwealth wrestling team, but turned it down to pursue a professional wrestling career and began training under compatriot Simi Taitoko "Toks" Fale. He has also trained in mixed martial arts, catch wrestling and Muay Thai with other New Zealand fighters such as Shane Young, Kai Kara-France, and Mark Hunt, as well as with the Nigerian Israel Adesanya.

== Professional wrestling career ==
=== Early career (2008–2016) ===
Henry made his professional wrestling debut in 2008, mainly performing on the New Zealand independent scene for promotions such as Impact Pro Wrestling (IPW).

=== New Japan Pro-Wrestling (2016–present) ===
==== Young Lion (2016–2021) ====
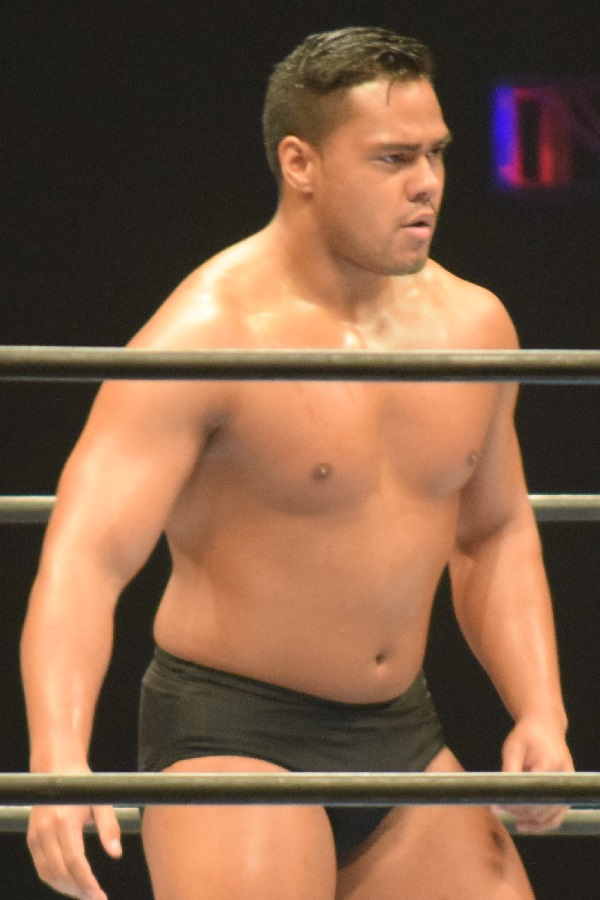
Henare in 2017

Henry signed with New Japan Pro-Wrestling (NJPW) in early 2016 and debuted in September of that year, losing to Pro Wrestling Noah's Quiet Storm at Lion's Gate Project 3. Henry's first win in NJPW came on 6 September, when he defeated fellow young lion Hirai Kawato. He appeared on his first major NJPW show, Destruction in Tokyo on 17 September, teaming with David Finlay against Roppongi Vice. On 12 November, Henry returned to his home city of Auckland, New Zealand, defeating Hikule'o at a Bad Luck Fale produced show. Henare entered the 2016 World Tag League alongside veteran Manabu Nakanishi. On 21 February 2017, in a match with Tomoyuki Oka, Henry suffered an Achilles tendon injury and the match had to be stopped. He was taken out on a stretcher. He returned in November for the 2017 World Tag League, where he teamed with Togi Makabe.

On the Wrestle Kingdom 12 pre-show on 4 January 2018, Henry debuted under the new ring name Toa Henare. On 27 January, at the New Beginning in Sapporo, Toa received his first title shot when he teamed up with Ryusuke Taguchi and Togi Makabe to unsuccessfully challenge the Guerillas of Destiny and Bad Luck Fale for the NEVER Openweight 6-Man Tag Team Championship. In April 2018, he began showing promise within the company, wowing fans with a classic Strong Style showcasing against Tomohiro Ishii during the Dontaku series.

In 2019, Henare teamed with Hiroshi Tanahashi for the World Tag League, finishing with 3 wins and 12 losses. The next year, the duo teamed again now dubbed as "HenarACE". In early 2020, he was slated to face Tomohiro Ishii in the main event of the New Japan Cup; however, the COVID-19 pandemic put plans on hold for the company to put Henare in the main event.

==== United Empire (2021–present) ====
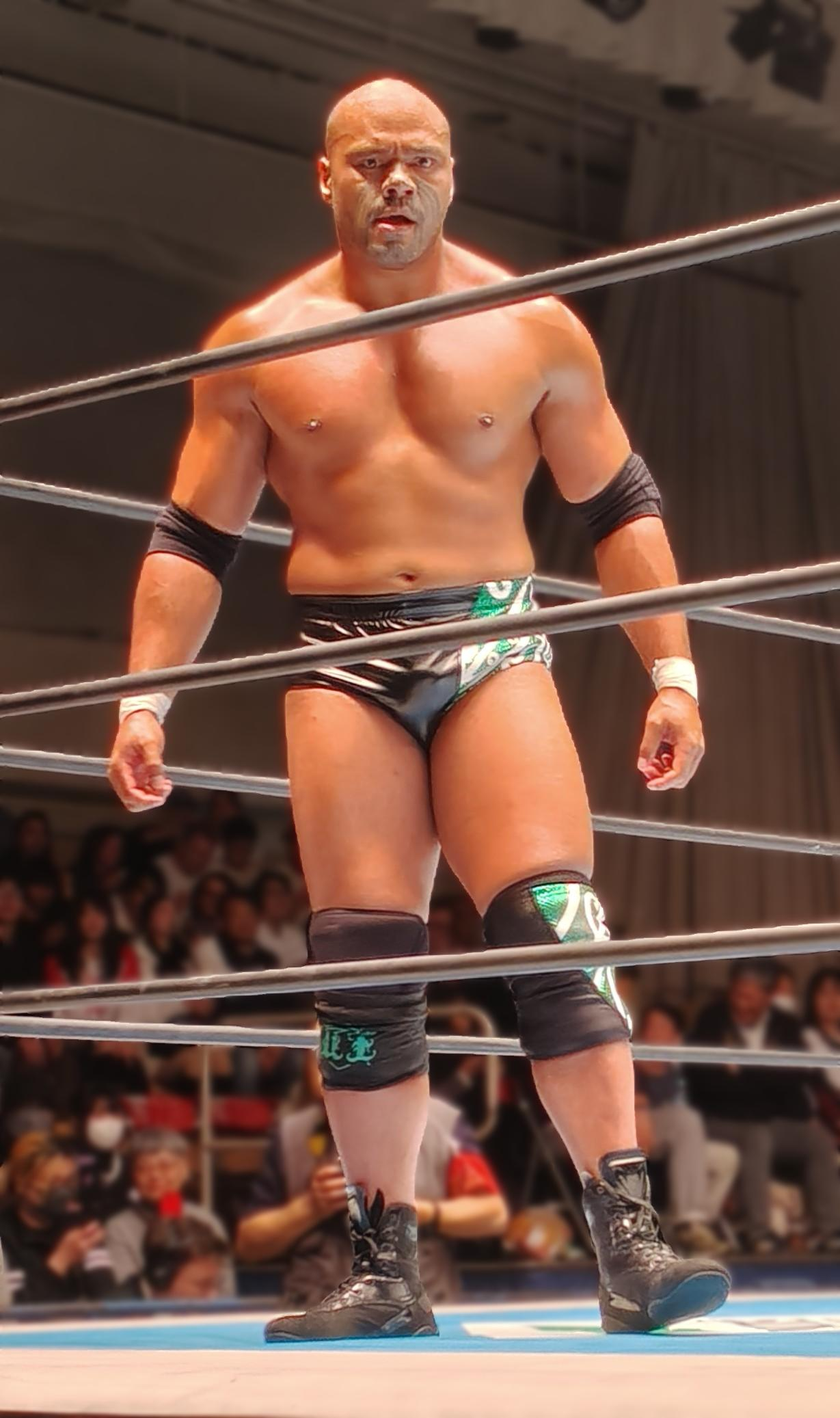
Henare in 2026

On 4 April 2021 Henare, now going by the ring name Aaron Henare, was revealed as the new member of Will Ospreay's United Empire faction, turning heel in the process, as he teamed up with new stablemates Great-O-Khan and Jeff Cobb to defeat the Los Ingobernables de Japón team of Tetsuya Naito, Shingo Takagi, and Sanada at the Sakura Genesis 2021 event. During the Road to Dontaku tour series in 2021, Henare ruptured his C6–C7 disc in his neck, having to take six months off to heal the injury.

Henare recovered and teamed with O-Khan in the World Tag League, where they finished with a total of 14 points. After returning from injury, Henare began to gain momentum with victories over former champions and team members such as Hiroyoshi Tenzan, Yuji Nagata, Tiger Mask, Tomoaki Honma, and former Tag Team partner Togi Makabe. This marked a turn in Henare's career, finally getting square with his former NJPW team members. At Wrestle Kingdom 16, Henare entered the New Japan Rambo match.

Henare entered his first Heavyweight singles tournament in NJPW, in the New Japan Cup. He beat Yuto Nakashima in round one but lost to then IWGP United States Heavyweight Champion Sanada in round 2. Henare made his NJPW Strong debut in America, teaming with O-Khan and new United Empire member TJP, to defeat Brody King, Mascara Dorada and Taylor Rust. At Windy City Riot, Henare teamed with, Cobb, O-Khan and new members, Aussie Open (Mark Davis and Kyle Fletcher) to defeat Bullet Club. In May, Henare made his Revolution Pro Wrestling debut, against Ricky Knight Jr. In June, Henare was announced for the G1 Climax 32 tournament as part of the C Block, making his G1 debut. Henare managed to pin his former partner and 3-time G1 Champion, Hiroshi Tanahashi in the opening match. On 4 January 2023, at Wrestle Kingdom 17, Henare once again competed in the New Japan Rambo. The following day at New Year Dash!!, Henare and Jeff Cobb lost to Kenny Omega and Kazuchika Okada in a tag-team match.

In March, Henare competed in the 2023 New Japan Cup, pinning KOPW champion Shingo Takagi in the first round, before being eliminated in the following round by Tama Tonga. Henare then used this performance to challenge Takagi to the first "Ultimate Triad Match", meaning the winner of the match would have to win the match by pin, submission, and standing count in order to win the match. On 2 March, Henare was unsuccessful in capturing the KOPW championship, however, gained acclaim for the match which lasted 38 minutes, and gained a 5.25 star rating by the Wrestling Observer Newsletter. In June at Dominion 6.4 in Osaka-jo Hall, Henare teamed with Great-O-Khan in a three-way match for both the vacant IWGP Tag Team Championships and the Strong Openweight Tag Team Championships, however, the match was won by Bishamon (Hirooki Goto and Yoshi-Hashi) and also involved House of Torture (Evil and Yujiro Takahashi).

Upon entering the 33rd G1 Climax tournament on 16 July 2023, Henare showcased a new tā moko tattoo on his face and shortening his ring name to just Henare, whilst also shaving his head. The tā moko, or "mataora" tattoo, made Henare the first ever Polynesian wrestler to sport the tattoo in a mainstream professional wrestling promotion. He had previously revealed the tattoo earlier in the month at a New Zealand wrestling show. Henare competed in the C Block of the tournament, finishing with 4 points, thus failing to advance to the semi-finals. Along with the changes to his look, Henare adopted a new theme song, 'Kai Tangata', performed by the New Zealand-based metal band Alien Weaponry and entirely sung in Maori.

On 11 February 2024 at The New Beginning in Osaka, Henare and his stablemates were defeated by the Bullet Club War Dogs in a Dog Pound match. During the match, Henare suffered a laceration on his head after Gabe Kidd threw a table at him. Will Ospreay descibred the injury as "the worst thing I've ever seen" and claimed he could have fit four of his fingers in his head. On 16 June 2024 at New Japan Soul, Henare defeated Shingo Takagi to win the NEVER Openweight Championship for the first time. He would drop the title back to Takagi on 29 September at Destruction in Kobe, ending his reign at 105 days. In January 2025, it was reported that Henare would miss the rest of the year due to a knee injury that he suffered a month prior.

On 4 January 2026 at Wrestle Kingdom 20, Henare returned after over a year out of action, teaming with stablemates Callum Newman and Great O-Khan along with new additions to the United Empire Andrade El Idolo and Jake Lee to defeat Bullet Club War Dogs (David Finlay, Gabe Kidd, and Drilla Moloney) and Unaffiliated (Shingo Takagi and Hiromu Takahashi). On Night 2 of Wrestling Dontaku on 4 May, Henare, O-Khan, and the recently returned Will Ospreay defeated Bishamon-tin (Boltin Oleg, Hirooki Goto, and Yoshi-Hashi) to win the NEVER Openweight 6-Man Tag Team Championship. On June 14 at Dominion 6.14 in Osaka-jo Hall, Henare and O-Khan defeated Knock Out Brothers (Oskar and Yuto-Ice) to win the IWGP Tag Team Championship. Henare and O-Khan lost the titles back to Knock Out Brothers on October 6 during the Road to King of Pro-Wrestling tour, ending their reign at 114 days. On October 12 at King of Pro-Wrestling, Heanre, O-Khan, and Ospreay lost the titles to Unbound Co. (Yuto-Ice, Oskar, and Jeff Cobb), ending their reign at 161 days.

=== All Elite Wrestling (2022, 2026–present) ===
Due to NJPW's working relationshiip with All Elite Wrestling (AEW), Henare has made appearances for the promotion in 2022 and 2026 with his United Empire stablemates, teaming with them against the Death Riders, Don Callis Family, The Dogs, and The Demand as well as accompanying Will Ospreay to the ring for his AEW World Championship match against Kenny Omega at All In on August 30, 2026.

== Championships and accomplishments ==
Henare is a two-time IWGP Tag Team Champion and one-time NEVER Openweight 6-Man Tag Team Champion

=== Amateur wrestling ===
- 96 kg Freestyle Wrestling New Zealand National Champion
- 96 kg Greco-Roman Wrestling New Zealand National Champion
- 96 kg Grappling New Zealand National Champion

=== Professional wrestling ===
- Aotearoa Wrestling
  - Undisputed Aotearoa New Zealand Heavyweight Championship (1 time, current)
  - Northland Championship (1 time)
- Impact Pro Wrestling
  - IPW New Zealand Tag Team Championship (2 times) – with Jakob Cross
  - Armageddon Cup Championship (1 time)
- New Japan Pro Wrestling
  - NEVER Openweight Championship (1 time)
  - IWGP Tag Team Championship (2 times) – with Great-O-Khan
  - NEVER Openweight 6-Man Tag Team Championship (1 time) – with Will Ospreay and Great-O-Khan
- Pro Wrestling Illustrated
  - Ranked No. 250 of the top 500 singles wrestlers in the PWI 500 in 2018
- World Series Wrestling
  - WSW Tag Team Championship (1 time) – with Andrade El Idolo
