= Power Struggle (2015) =

2015 New Japan Pro-Wrestling pay-per-view event

- Promotional poster for the event, featuring various NJPW wrestlers
- Promotion: New Japan Pro-Wrestling
- Date: November 7, 2015
- City: Osaka, Japan
- Venue: Osaka Prefectural Gymnasium
- Attendance: 5,128

Pay-per-view chronology
← Previous; King of Pro-Wrestling	Next → Wrestle Kingdom 10 in Tokyo Dome

Power Struggle chronology
← Previous; 2014	Next → 2016

Power Struggle (2015) was a professional wrestling pay-per-view (PPV) event promoted by New Japan Pro-Wrestling (NJPW). The event took place on November 7, 2015, in Osaka, Osaka, at the Osaka Prefectural Gymnasium and featured nine matches, two of which were contested for championships as well as the finals of the 2015 Super Jr. Tag Tournament.

In addition to airing worldwide through NJPW World, the event also aired in Japan as a regular PPV through SKY PerfecTV!. It was the fifth event under the Power Struggle name.

== Storylines ==
Power Struggle featured nine professional wrestling matches that involved different wrestlers from pre-existing scripted feuds and storylines. Wrestlers portrayed villains, heroes, or less distinguishable characters in the scripted events that built tension and culminated in a wrestling match or series of matches.

Power Struggle was main evented by Shinsuke Nakamura defending the IWGP Intercontinental Championship against Karl Anderson. After regaining the title from Hirooki Goto on September 27, 2015, at Destruction in Kobe, Nakamura was immediately confronted and challenged by IWGP Tag Team Champion Karl Anderson, who noted he had defeated both Nakamura and Goto during the 2015 G1 Climax and therefore deserved a title shot. The challenge was promptly accepted by Nakamura. The following day, it was announced that the match would be taking place at November's Power Struggle. Prior to the title match, NJPW played up Nakamura and Anderson's long history together, which included them training together at NJPW's dojo in Los Angeles at the start of their careers. Much like the previous year, the IWGP Heavyweight Championship was not defended at Power Struggle, giving the IWGP Intercontinental Championship match the main event spot. Nakamura announced that should he get past Anderson, he would next defend the title at January's Wrestle Kingdom 10 in Tokyo Dome in an open challenge. It was teased that the challenger would show up at Power Struggle.

Another top match at Power Struggle saw IWGP Heavyweight Champion Kazuchika Okada team up with Kazushi Sakuraba to take on Hiroshi Tanahashi and Katsuyori Shibata. This built up the main event of Wrestle Kingdom 10 in Tokyo Dome, where Okada would defend his title against Tanahashi. Originally Tanahashi was scheduled to team with Kota Ibushi, but on November 2 NJPW announced that Ibushi was sidelined indefinitely with a cervical disc herniation, replacing him with Shibata. This put the former teacher–student pairing of Sakuraba and Shibata together in the ring for the first time since their match against each other at July's Dominion 7.5 in Osaka-jo Hall. That match was won by Shibata.

Power Struggle also featured a match for the NEVER Openweight Championship with Tomohiro Ishii defending against Tomoaki Honma. After regaining the title from Togi Makabe on October 12 at King of Pro-Wrestling, Ishii was quickly challenged by Honma, leading to his first title defense. The two previously wrestled for the then vacant NEVER Openweight Championship on February 14, 2015, at The New Beginning in Sendai, where Ishii was victorious. They also met during the 2015 G1 Climax, where Honma picked up his only win of the tournament over Ishii. The win culminated a two-year storyline, where Honma wrestled 17 G1 Climax matches, before finally picking up his first ever win. Ishii welcomed Honma's challenge, considering the previous loss against him a "disgrace".

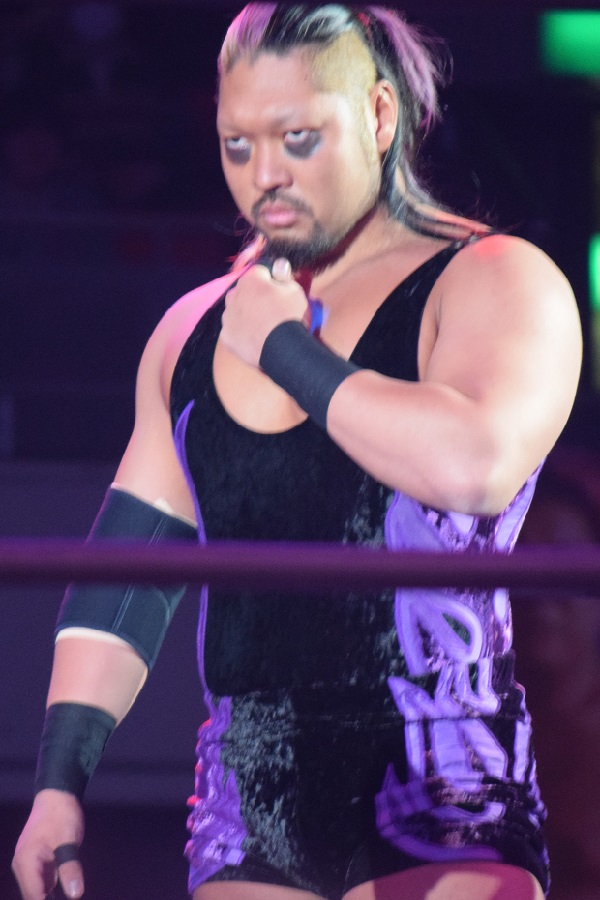
Evil, who was set to wrestle his first NJPW match in two years at Power Struggle

Prior to King of Pro-Wrestling, Tetsuya Naito had announced that he would be bringing in a pareja (partner) to witness his match against Hiroshi Tanahashi on October 12, contested for the right to challenge for the IWGP Heavyweight Championship at Wrestle Kingdom 10. Naito had recently joined the Los Ingobernables stable in the Consejo Mundial de Lucha Libre (CMLL) promotion and the announcement led to speculation that he was bringing in one of his partners from the Mexican promotion. Instead of being any of Naito's CMLL partners, the pareja was instead revealed as Takaaki Watanabe, who made a surprise return to NJPW following a two-year learning excursion in the United States, but his attack on Tanahashi was stopped by Katsuyori Shibata, who had feuded with Naito over the past months, and his tag team partner Hirooki Goto. After Naito had been defeated by Tanahashi, Watanabe attacked Goto, laying him out. In a post-match interview, Naito renamed Watanabe "King of Darkness" Evil. The following day, NJPW announced that Watanabe, as "Evil", would be wrestling his first match since his return at Power Struggle against Goto. NJPW also announced that Naito would miss the entire "Road to Power Struggle" tour as well as Power Struggle itself. Naito was sidelined due to an earlobe injury he had suffered in the match against Tanahashi, and on October 23 returned to CMLL, working alongside his Los Ingobernables stablemates in a non-wrestling role.

Power Struggle was also set to feature the finals of the 2015 Super Jr. Tag Tournament. The finalists of the eight-team single-elimination tournament were determined between October 24 and November 1. Matt Sydal and Ricochet advanced to the finals with wins over Time Splitters (Alex Shelley and Kushida) and The Young Bucks (Matt Jackson and Nick Jackson), while Roppongi Vice (Beretta and Rocky Romero) advanced with wins over Bullet Club (Chase Owens and Kenny Omega) and reigning IWGP Junior Heavyweight Tag Team Champions reDRagon (Bobby Fish and Kyle O'Reilly). The other four tag teams in the tournament were put in an eight-man tag team match. This match also served as a build-up to a future IWGP Junior Heavyweight Championship match between champion Kenny Omega and challenger Kushida.

== Event ==
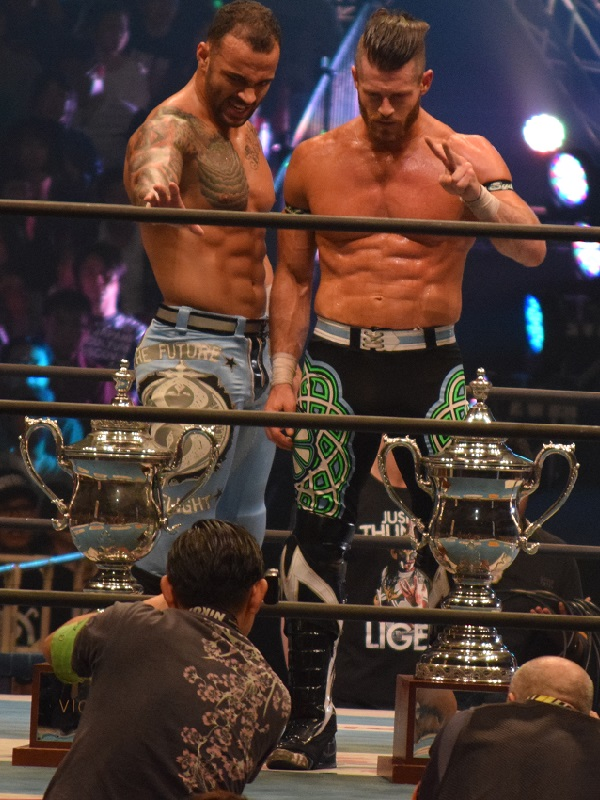
Ricochet and Matt Sydal after winning the 2015 Super Jr. Tag Tournament at Power Struggle

The third match of the event, Evil's first NJPW match in two years, ended in a disqualification, when Tetsuya Naito made a surprise appearance and attacked Goto. Following the match, Katsuyori Shibata ran in to save Goto, continuing the rivalry between the two teams. In the finals of the 2015 Super Jr. Tag Tournament, Matt Sydal and Ricochet emerged victorious over Roppongi Vice. After the match, Sydal and Ricochet made a challenge for reDRagon's IWGP Junior Heavyweight Tag Team Championship, but were interrupted by Roppongi Vice, who claimed they had also earned a title shot by defeating reDRagon in the semifinals of the tournament. This led to The Young Bucks coming out and stating that as former champions, they also wanted a shot at the title, setting up a future four-way title program.

In the first title match of the event, Tomohiro Ishii made his first successful defense of the NEVER Openweight Championship against crowd favorite Tomoaki Honma. In the semi-main event, Hiroshi Tanahashi and Katsuyori Shibata defeated IWGP Heavyweight Champion Kazuchika Okada and Kazushi Sakuraba with Shibata pinning his former partner Sakuraba for the win. After the match, Okada and Tanahashi brawled with each other. In the main event, Shinsuke Nakamura made his first successful defense of the IWGP Intercontinental Championship against Karl Anderson, despite outside interference from Anderson's Bullet Club stablemates. After the match, A.J. Styles, who had accompanied Anderson to the match, entered the ring and challenged Nakamura to a title match. Nakamura closed the show by accepting the challenge for Tokyo Dome.

== Reception ==
Sean Radican of Pro Wrestling Torch gave the event an overall score of 8.0, stating that "although this wasn't a blow the doors off show, it was really good". He praised the NEVER Openweight Championship match, calling it "an absolute must-see match" and giving it a rating of four and three quarter stars out of five. Dave Meltzer of the Wrestling Observer Newsletter called Power Struggle "a textbook PPV to lead into the big show of the year, as when it was over, you knew all the big matches and they gave the impression they'd be great, plus this was a great show even without the angles". He too named the NEVER Openweight Championship the "highlight of the show", calling it a match of the year candidate "with reservations", adding "[h]ad Honma won, as the crowd was hoping, it could have been the match of the year, but they once again held that off". He gave the match four and three quarter stars out of five.

== Aftermath ==
Two days after Power Struggle, NJPW announced three more title matches for Wrestle Kingdom 10 in Tokyo Dome; Shinsuke Nakamura defending the IWGP Intercontinental Championship against A.J. Styles, Kenny Omega defending the IWGP Junior Heavyweight Championship against Kushida and reDRagon defending the IWGP Junior Heavyweight Tag Team Championship in a four-way match with Matt Sydal and Ricochet, Roppongi Vice and The Young Bucks.

== Results ==
No.	Results	Stipulations	Times
1	Jyushin Thunder Liger, Máscara Dorada, Ryusuke Taguchi and Tiger Mask defeated David Finlay, Jay White, Sho Tanaka and Yohei Komatsu	Eight-man tag team match	07:46
2	Bullet Club (Cody Hall, Doc Gallows and Tama Tonga) defeated Captain New Japan, Juice Robinson and Togi Makabe	Six-man tag team match	07:53
3	Hirooki Goto defeated Evil by disqualification	Singles match	08:53
4	Time Splitters (Alex Shelley and Kushida) and reDRagon (Bobby Fish and Kyle O'Reilly) defeated Bullet Club (Chase Owens, Kenny Omega, Matt Jackson and Nick Jackson)	Eight-man tag team match	08:53
5	Matt Sydal and Ricochet defeated Roppongi Vice (Beretta and Rocky Romero)	Tag team match; finals of the 2015 Super Jr. Tag Tournament	16:06
6	Bullet Club (A.J. Styles and Bad Luck Fale) defeated Chaos (Toru Yano and Yoshi-Hashi)	Tag team match	09:02
7	Tomohiro Ishii (c) defeated Tomoaki Honma	Singles match for the NEVER Openweight Championship	17:26
8	Hiroshi Tanahashi and Katsuyori Shibata defeated Kazuchika Okada (with Gedo) and Kazushi Sakuraba	Tag team match	15:33
9	Shinsuke Nakamura (c) defeated Karl Anderson (with A.J. Styles, Bad Luck Fale, Chase Owens, Cody Hall, Doc Gallows and Tama Tonga)	Singles match for the IWGP Intercontinental Championship	21:37
(c) / – the champion(s) heading into the match
