= Wrestle Kingdom 13 =

2019 New Japan Pro-Wrestling event

- Promotional poster for the event, featuring various NJPW wrestlers
- Promotion: New Japan Pro-Wrestling
- Date: January 4, 2019
- City: Tokyo, Japan
- Venue: Tokyo Dome
- Attendance: 38,162 (paid)
- Tagline: Professional wrestling's Winterfest! January 4th!! (Japanese: プロレス! 冬フェスト! イッテンヨン!!, Hepburn: Puroresu! Fuyufesuto! Ittenyon!!)

Event chronology
← Previous; Global Wars 2018; Wrestle Kingdom 13 Fan Festa	Next → New Year Dash!!

Wrestle Kingdom chronology
← Previous; 12	Next → 14

Wrestle Kingdom 13 in Tokyo Dome was a professional wrestling event produced by New Japan Pro-Wrestling (NJPW). The event took place on January 4, 2019, at the Tokyo Dome in Tokyo, Japan. It was the twenty-eighth January 4 Tokyo Dome Show and the thirteenth promoted under the Wrestle Kingdom name. The event was streamed live on NJPW World and FITE TV and was aired on tape delay on AXS TV.

The card was composed of ten matches, including one occurring on the pre-show. In the main event, G1 Climax 28 winner Hiroshi Tanahashi defeated Kenny Omega to win the IWGP Heavyweight Championship for a record eighth time. In other prominent matches, Tetsuya Naito defeated Chris Jericho to win the IWGP Intercontinental Championship, Taiji Ishimori defeated Kushida to win the IWGP Junior Heavyweight Championship, Zack Sabre Jr. defeated Tomohiro Ishii to win the British Heavyweight Championship, Bullet Club leader Jay White defeated Chaos leader Kazuchika Okada, and Juice Robinson defeated Cody for the IWGP United States Heavyweight Championship. All eight title defenses at the event were unsuccessful, marking the first time in Wrestle Kingdom history that every contested title changed hands; Tanahashi's win also marked the first time that the holder of the Tokyo Dome IWGP Heavyweight Championship challenge rights certificate won his Wrestle Kingdom title match.

== Production ==
Other on-screen personnel
Role:	Name:
Commentators	Don Callis (English-language announcer)
Commentators	Kevin Kelly (English-language announcer)
Commentators	Chris Charlton (English-language announcer)
Ring announcers	Kimihiko Ozaki (First half)
Ring announcers	Makoto Abe (Second half)
Referees	Kenta Sato
Referees	Marty Asami
Referees	Red Shoes Unno
Referees	Tiger Hattori

=== Background ===
The January 4 Tokyo Dome Show is NJPW's biggest annual event and has been called "the largest professional wrestling show in the world outside of the United States", the "Japanese equivalent to the Super Bowl" and considered the equivalent to the American WWE's WrestleMania. The show has been promoted under the Wrestle Kingdom name since 2007.

Wrestle Kingdom 13 was officially announced during the final of the annual G1 Climax on August 12, 2018.

=== Storylines ===
Wrestle Kingdom 13 featured professional wrestling matches that involve different wrestlers from pre-existing scripted feuds and storylines. Wrestlers portray villains, heroes, or less distinguishable characters in the scripted events that built tension and culminated in a wrestling match or series of matches.

On August 12, 2018, Hiroshi Tanahashi defeated Kota Ibushi to win the G1 Climax 28. As is an annual tradition since the 2012 G1 Climax, the winner of the tournament receives the Tokyo Dome IWGP Heavyweight Championship challenge rights certificate, which grants him a match at the next Wrestle Kingdom event for the IWGP Heavyweight Championship. Tanahashi went on to defend the certificate against Kazuchika Okada on September 23 at Destruction in Kobe and Jay White on October 8 at King of Pro-Wrestling. Similarly, the IWGP Heavyweight Champion Kenny Omega went on to defend his title against Tomohiro Ishii on September 15 at Destruction in Hiroshima and in a three-way match against Cody and Kota Ibushi also on October 8 at King of Pro-Wrestling. The match was then officially announced, with Omega defending the title against Tanahashi.

After the main event match at New Year Dash!! on January 5, 2018, Chris Jericho attacked Tetsuya Naito. Later in the year on April 29 at Wrestling Hinokuni, Naito won the IWGP Intercontinental Championship by defeating Minoru Suzuki. On May 4 at night 2 of Wrestling Dontaku, Jericho returned to attack Naito again and set a match between the two at Dominion 6.9 in Osaka-jo Hall for Naito's championship. Jericho went on to defeat Naito and win the title. His first defense was at Power Struggle on November 3 in which Jericho defeated Naito's Los Ingobernables de Japón stablemate Evil. After the end of the match, Naito went on to save Evil after Jericho's continued assault on him and proceeded to challenge Jericho for the championship. Despite Jericho's refusal, NJPW management went on to announce the match for Wrestle Kingdom 13. At Fan Fest on January 3, the match was changed to a no disqualification match.

On October 27, 2018, at the Road to Power Struggle, the tag teams of Taguchi Japan (Kushida and Chris Sabin) and Bullet Club (Taiji Ishimori and Robbie Eagles) faced off in a tournament match of the Super Junior Tag League. The Bullet Club team went on to win that match with Ishimori pinning the IWGP Junior Heavyweight Champion Kushida, laying a possible challenge on the table. On November 3 at Power Struggle, Kushida was set to team with the Great Bash Heel to face Eagles and the Guerrillas of Destiny in a six-man tag team match. Ishimori in crutches was in the corner of his Bullet Club stablemates and ended up costing Kushida the match, hitting him with a crutch. After the match, he revealed that he had faked the injury and held up Kushida's title. On the following Monday, NJPW management announced a match between the two for the championship.

On January 5, 2018, at New Year Dash!!, newly returned Jay White was invited by Bullet Club's leader Kenny Omega to join his faction. White seemed to accept, but then turned on Omega and left the ring. On the following day, NJPW hosted a post-Wrestle Kingdom 12 press conference to announce White as a new member of Chaos instead. During the press conference, White expressed his ambitions towards the leader Kazuchika Okada's IWGP Heavyweight Championship title and said that he was not going to "fall in the background" like several other members of Chaos. In response, Okada said that White was not on his level yet and that if they were to wrestle in the future he would realize that. Throughout White's time in Chaos, he would pull for intra-faction matches, even picking fellow Chaos member Tomohiro Ishii to win the New Japan Cup and urging him to challenge Okada if he were to win the tournament. He would also attack opponents before the start of his matches, much to the disapproval of his teammates. White was drawn in Okada's block at the annual G1 Climax tournament and on July 14 at the first night defeated him through nefarious means such as knocking down the referee, using a chair and hitting Okada with a low blow. Neither of them advanced to the final of the tournament, which was won by Hiroshi Tanahashi. On September 23 at Destruction in Kobe, Okada challenged Tanahashi for his Tokyo Dome IWGP Heavyweight Championship challenge rights certificate, but lost. After the match, White attacked both Tanahashi and Okada, with Okada's former longtime manager Gedo turning on him and aligning himself with White. On October 8 at King of Pro-Wrestling, White unsuccessfully challenged Tanahashi for the certificate and assaulted him only for Okada to make the save. Okada turned his focus to Gedo and this brought Gedo's tag team partner Jado. Initially, it seemed that Jado was trying to be the peacekeeper, but he eventually turned on Okada as Bullet Club's OG faction rushed to the ring and assaulted him. White, Gedo and Jado ended up joining Bullet Club. On November 3 at Power Struggle, Okada tagged with his stablemate Beretta to defeat the team of White and Bad Luck Fale. White proceeded to challenge Okada to a singles match, anytime and anywhere, which NJPW management officially announced for Wrestle Kingdom 13.

On November 3, 2018, at Power Struggle, the team of Roppongi 3K (Sho and Yoh) defeated the IWGP Junior Heavyweight Tag Team Champion team of Suzuki-gun (Yoshinobu Kanemaru and El Desperado) and the team of Los Ingobernables de Japón (Bushi and Shingo Takagi) in a three-way tag team match to win the Super Junior Tag League. On the following Monday, the same match was scheduled for this event—this time for Suzuki-gun's championship.

On October 14, 2018, at Global Wars UK, Tomohiro Ishii defeated Minoru Suzuki to win the British Heavyweight Championship. At Power Struggle, Ishii defeated Suzuki to retain the title. On November 9 at Revolution Pro Wrestling's Uprising event, Tomohiro Ishii successfully defended the championship against David Starr. Following the match, Ishii was attacked by Zack Sabre Jr. and Suzuki-gun, with Sabre challenging Ishii for a championship match at Wrestle Kingdom 13.

On July 7, 2018, at G1 Special in San Francisco, Juice Robinson defeated Jay White to win the IWGP United States Championship. During his first defense at Fighting Spirit Unleashed, Robinson was defeated by Cody. A rematch was later scheduled for Wrestle Kingdom.

On December 9, 2018, Los Ingobernables de Japón (Sanada and Evil) defeated Bullet Club's Tama Tonga and Tanga Loa to win the World Tag League. Following the match, Sanada and Evil challenged for an IWGP Tag Team Championship match at Wrestle Kingdom before being interrupted by The Young Bucks. A three-way match was later announced for Wrestle Kingdom.

Will Ospreay was originally supposed to face Taichi for the NEVER Openweight Championship at Power Struggle, however, the match was later cancelled due to an injury suffered by Ospreay. On the final day of World Tag League, Ospreay defeated Taichi to become the number-one contender to the NEVER Openweight Championship. On the same night, he challenged the new NEVER Openweight Champion, Kota Ibushi, to a championship match at Wrestle Kingdom 13.

== Results ==
No.	Results	Stipulations	Times
1^{P}	The Most Violent Players (Togi Makabe and Toru Yano) and Ryusuke Taguchi defeated Yuji Nagata, Jeff Cobb and David Finlay, Chaos (Hirooki Goto, Beretta and Chuckie T.), Suzuki-gun (Minoru Suzuki, Lance Archer and Davey Boy Smith Jr.) and The Elite (Hangman Page, Yujiro Takahashi and Marty Scurll) (with Chase Owens and Pieter)	Gauntlet match to determine the #1 contenders to the NEVER Openweight 6-Man Tag Team Championship	27:47
2	Will Ospreay defeated Kota Ibushi (c)	Singles match for the NEVER Openweight Championship	18:13
3	Los Ingobernables de Japón (Bushi and Shingo Takagi) defeated Suzuki-gun (Yoshinobu Kanemaru and El Desperado) (c) and Roppongi 3K (Sho and Yoh) (with Rocky Romero)	Three-way tag team match for the IWGP Junior Heavyweight Tag Team Championship	6:50
4	Zack Sabre Jr. (with Taka Michinoku) defeated Tomohiro Ishii (c)	Singles match for the British Heavyweight Championship	11:35
5	Los Ingobernables de Japón (Sanada and Evil) defeated Guerrillas of Destiny (Tama Tonga and Tanga Loa) (c) (with Bad Luck Fale and Jado) and The Young Bucks (Matt Jackson and Nick Jackson)	Three-way tag team match for the IWGP Tag Team Championship	10:15
6	Juice Robinson defeated Cody (c) (with Brandi Rhodes)	Singles match for the IWGP United States Heavyweight Championship	9:02
7	Taiji Ishimori defeated Kushida (c)	Singles match for the IWGP Junior Heavyweight Championship	11:17
8	Jay White (with Gedo) defeated Kazuchika Okada	Singles match	14:18
9	Tetsuya Naito defeated Chris Jericho (c)	No Disqualification match for the IWGP Intercontinental Championship	22:35
10	Hiroshi Tanahashi defeated Kenny Omega (c) (with The Young Bucks (Matt Jackson and Nick Jackson))	Singles match for the IWGP Heavyweight Championship	39:13
(c) / – the champion(s) heading into the match; P / – the match was broadcast on the pre-show

== See also ==
- 2019 in professional wrestling
- Professional wrestling at the Tokyo Dome
- List of NJPW pay-per-view events
