= Power Struggle (2016) =

2016 New Japan Pro-Wrestling event

- Promotional poster for the event, featuring various NJPW wrestlers
- Promotion: New Japan Pro-Wrestling
- Date: November 5, 2016
- City: Osaka, Japan
- Venue: Osaka Prefectural Gymnasium (Edion Arena Osaka)
- Attendance: 5,050

Event chronology
← Previous; King of Pro-Wrestling	Next → Global Wars UK

Power Struggle chronology
← Previous; 2015	Next → 2017

New Japan Pro-Wrestling events chronology
← Previous; King of Pro-Wrestling	Next → Global Wars UK 2016 Night 1

Power Struggle (2016) was a professional wrestling event promoted by New Japan Pro-Wrestling (NJPW). The event took place on November 5, 2016, in Osaka, Osaka, at the Osaka Prefectural Gymnasium (Edion Arena Osaka). It was the sixth event under the Power Struggle name and featured ten matches, main evented by Tetsuya Naito defending the IWGP Intercontinental Championship against Jay Lethal.

== Storylines ==
Power Struggle featured ten professional wrestling matches that involved different wrestlers from pre-existing scripted feuds and storylines. Wrestlers portrayed villains, heroes, or less distinguishable characters in the scripted events that built tension and culminated in a wrestling match or series of matches.

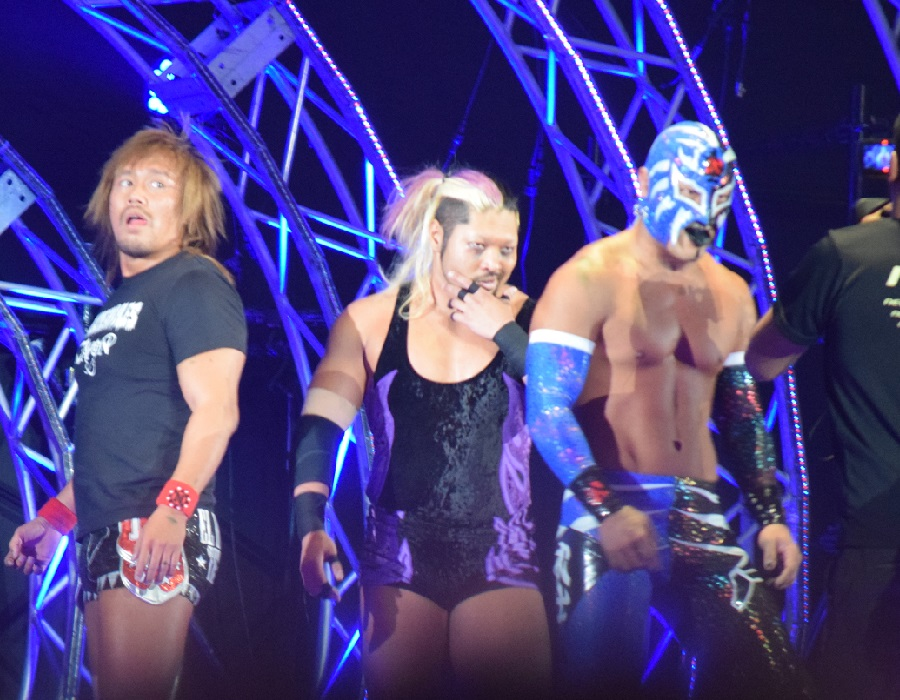
(Left to right) Tetsuya Naito, Evil and Bushi of the Los Ingobernables de Japón stable, who were all involved in title matches at Power Struggle

Power Struggle was headlined by a four match series involving members of the villainous Los Ingobernables de Japón (L.I.J.) stable taking on representatives of NJPW. In the main event, L.I.J. leader Tetsuya Naito was originally scheduled to make his first defense of the IWGP Intercontinental Championship against Michael Elgin. This would have been a rematch from the September 25 Destruction in Kobe event, where Naito defeated Elgin to become the new IWGP Intercontinental Champion. Following the win, Naito began disrespecting the title belt, stating he did not want it, throwing it in the air and stepping on it, drawing the ire of Elgin. On October 10 at King of Pro-Wrestling, Elgin pinned Naito in an eight-man tag team match and afterwards stated he was getting the IWGP Intercontinental Championship back. The match was officially announced the following day. However, that same day, it was also reported that Elgin had suffered a broken left eye socket taking a dropkick from Naito in the King of Pro-Wrestling match. On October 12, Elgin confirmed he would need surgery on the eye. The following day, NJPW officially pulled Elgin from the Power Struggle main event and replaced him with Ring of Honor (ROH) wrestler Jay Lethal. Lethal had joined L.I.J. during a show co-produced by NJPW and ROH on February 20, 2016, however, the alliance ended on August 20, when he had a falling out with Naito. Afterwards, Lethal aligned himself with Elgin and the rest of the NJPW wrestlers not affiliated with any particular stable. On September 30 at ROH's All Star Extravaganza VIII event, Lethal defeated Naito in a non-title match, setting himself up for a future shot at the Intercontinental Championship, which was now granted due to Elgin's injury.

Another title match would see Katsuyori Shibata make his fourth defense of the NEVER Openweight Championship against L.I.J. member Evil. After successfully defending the title against Kyle O'Reilly at King of Pro-Wrestling, Shibata was confronted by Pro Wrestling Noah representative Go Shiozaki, seemingly setting him up as the next title challenger. However, after Shiozaki had left the ring, Shibata was attacked by Evil, who laid him out and then posed with the NEVER Openweight Championship belt. The following day, NJPW announced that Evil would get the title shot at Power Struggle, while Shiozaki would get Shibata in a non-title match at Noah's October 23 event, which Shibata went on to win. Shibata and Evil previously met during August's G1 Climax, where Evil was victorious, ending Shibata's hopes of advancing to the final of the tournament.

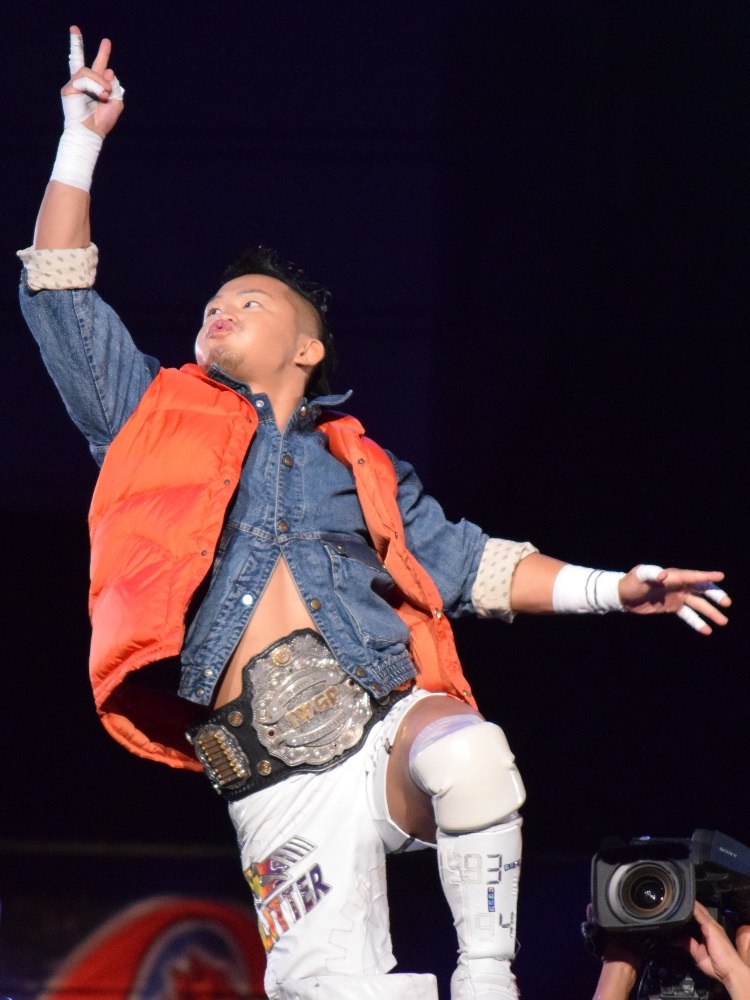
Kushida, who challenged for the IWGP Junior Heavyweight Championship at Power Struggle

The IWGP Junior Heavyweight Championship would also be defended at Power Struggle with defending champion, L.I.J. member Bushi, taking on challenger Kushida in his first title defense. This is a rematch from the September 17 Destruction in Tokyo event, where Bushi defeated Kushida to capture the IWGP Junior Heavyweight Championship. Afterwards, Bushi publicly complained about NJPW's policy of automatic rematches, indicating he did not want to face Kushida in a rematch. However, after laying out Kushida following an eight-man tag team match at King of Pro-Wrestling, Bushi nominated Kushida as his next challenger as Kushida was being stretchered out of the arena. NJPW stated that Kushida would miss all events on the Power Struggle tour, excluding the Power Struggle event itself, with a neck injury.

The fourth match in the L.I.J. versus NJPW series would see Hiroshi Tanahashi taking on L.I.J. member Sanada. The two previously faced off during the 2016 G1 Climax, where Sanada scored an upset win over Tanahashi, submitting him with the Skull End finishing hold on the opening day. On October 8, Tanahashi pinned Sanada in an eight-man tag team match and afterwards stated he wanted another singles match with him.

Power Struggle's fourth title match would see the Guerrillas of Destiny (Tama Tonga and Tanga Loa) defend the IWGP Tag Team Championship against Chaos members Tomohiro Ishii and Yoshi-Hashi. On October 10 at King of Pro-Wrestling, Tonga and Loa defeated The Briscoe Brothers (Jay Briscoe and Mark Briscoe) to recapture the IWGP Tag Team Championship. Following the match, Tonga and Loa, along with their Bullet Club stablemates The Young Bucks (Matt Jackson and Nick Jackson), continued attacking the previous champions. This led to Tomohiro Ishii, whose Chaos stable had previously partnered with the Briscoes, trying to make the save, but was stopped by Tonga and Loa hitting him with their double-team finishing maneuver, the Guerrilla Warfare. Afterwards, Ishii recruited Chaos stablemate Yoshi-Hashi as his partner to try to capture the IWGP Tag Team Championship from Tonga and Loa.

Power Struggle was also set to feature the final of the fifth annual Super Jr. Tag Tournament. The first two rounds of the eight-team tournament took place between October 21 and October 30. In the semifinals on October 30, Roppongi Vice (Beretta and Rocky Romero) defeated Fuego and Ryusuke Taguchi, while A. C. H. and Taiji Ishimori defeated David Finlay and Ricochet, setting up a final between the two teams. Beretta and Romero entered the tournament in the midst of a storyline, where the two had begun showing signs of dissension, while ROH wrestler ACH and Noah wrestler Ishimori entered as the winners of Noah's 2016 NTV G+ Cup Junior Heavyweight Tag League. The match was officially announced on October 31.

On August 14, during the final 2016 G1 Climax event, NJPW aired a video that featured a "time bomb" with a countdown timer set to go off on November 5 at Power Struggle.

The rest of the matches were announced on October 31. Added were two six-man tag team matches and two eight-man tag team matches. One of the matches, which takes place between the Bullet Club and Chaos stables, was designed to build up the main event of Wrestle Kingdom 11 in Tokyo Dome between Chaos' IWGP Heavyweight Champion Kazuchika Okada and Bullet Club's number one contender Kenny Omega.

== Event ==
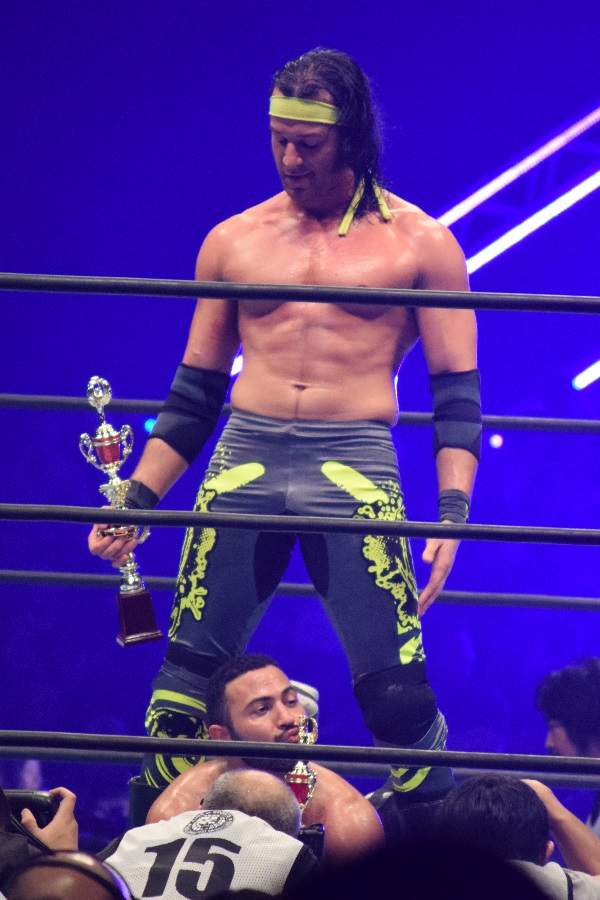
Roppongi Vice (Beretta [standing] and Rocky Romero [prone]) after winning the 2016 Super Jr. Tag Tournament

The first title match of the event saw the Guerrillas of Destiny make their first successful defense of the IWGP Tag Team Championship against Tomohiro Ishii and Yoshi-Hashi by pinning Yoshi-Hashi with their double-team finishing maneuver, Guerrilla Warfare. Next up was the final of the 2016 Super Jr. Tag Tournament between the team of ACH and Taiji Ishimori and Roppongi Vice, which Roppongi Vice won after hitting ACH with the Strong Zero double-team move. Following the win, Romero challenged The Young Bucks for the IWGP Junior Heavyweight Tag Team Championship, leading to a staredown between the two teams.

The next match saw Kushida defeat Bushi with the Hoverboard Lock to regain the IWGP Junior Heavyweight Championship. Following the match, the "time bomb" was revealed as the returning Hiromu Takahashi, who challenged Kushida to a title match at Wrestle Kingdom 11. In the eight-man tag team match between Kazuchika Okada's Chaos stable and Kenny Omega's Bullet Club stable, Bullet Club emerged victorious with Omega pinning the reigning IWGP Heavyweight Champion with his finishing maneuver, Katayoku no Tenshi.

The event concluded with a three-match series involving the Los Ingobernables de Japón stable. In the first match, L.I.J. member Evil defeated Katsuyori Shibata to become the new NEVER Openweight Champion. In the next match, Hiroshi Tanahashi avenged a loss from the 2016 G1 Climax by defeating Sanada. Finally, in the main event, Tetsuya Naito made his first successful defense of the IWGP Intercontinental Championship against Jay Lethal. Following the match, Naito was challenged to a match at Wrestle Kingdom 11 by Tanahashi.

== Aftermath ==
Ten days after Power Struggle, NJPW presented a show in Singapore, where Katsuyori Shibata defeated Evil in a rematch to regain the NEVER Openweight Championship.

== Results ==
No.	Results	Stipulations	Times
1^{D}	Hiroyoshi Tenzan, Juice Robinson and Satoshi Kojima defeated Manabu Nakanishi, Teruaki Kanemitsu and Yuji Nagata	Six-man tag team match	05:49
2	David Finlay, Jyushin Thunder Liger, Ricochet and Tiger Mask defeated Ángel de Oro, Fuego, Ryusuke Taguchi and Titán	Eight-man tag team match	05:30
3	Bullet Club (Bone Soldier, Chase Owens and Yujiro Takahashi) defeated Togi Makabe, Tomoaki Honma and Yoshitatsu	Six-man tag team match	07:36
4	Guerrillas of Destiny (Tama Tonga and Tanga Loa) (c) defeated Chaos (Tomohiro Ishii and Yoshi-Hashi)	Tag team match for the IWGP Tag Team Championship	14:32
5	Roppongi Vice (Beretta and Rocky Romero) defeated A. C. H. and Taiji Ishimori	Tag team match; final of the 2016 Super Jr. Tag Tournament	18:49
6	Kushida defeated Bushi (c) by submission	Singles match for the IWGP Junior Heavyweight Championship	15:11
7	Bullet Club (Adam Cole, Kenny Omega, Matt Jackson and Nick Jackson) defeated Chaos (Gedo, Hirooki Goto, Kazuchika Okada and Will Ospreay)	Eight-man tag team match	14:01
8	Evil defeated Katsuyori Shibata (c)	Singles match for the NEVER Openweight Championship	16:15
9	Hiroshi Tanahashi defeated Sanada	Singles match	21:33
10	Tetsuya Naito (c) defeated Jay Lethal	Singles match for the IWGP Intercontinental Championship	24:29
(c) / – the champion(s) heading into the match; D / – this was a dark match
