= Power Struggle (2014) =

2014 New Japan Pro-Wrestling event

- Promotional poster for the event, featuring Bad Luck Fale, Kazuchika Okada, A.J. Styles, Shinsuke Nakamura and Hiroshi Tanahashi
- Promotion: New Japan Pro-Wrestling
- Date: November 8, 2014
- City: Osaka, Japan
- Venue: Bodymaker Colosseum
- Attendance: 7,500

Pay-per-view chronology
← Previous; Road to Power Struggle	Next → World Tag League

Power Struggle chronology
← Previous; 2013	Next → 2015

New Japan Pro-Wrestling events chronology
← Previous; King of Pro-Wrestling	Next → Wrestle Kingdom 9

Power Struggle (2014) was a professional wrestling pay-per-view (PPV) event promoted by New Japan Pro-Wrestling (NJPW). The event took place on November 8, 2014, in Osaka, Osaka, at the Bodymaker Colosseum.

The event featured eleven matches (including one dark match), five of which were contested for championships. It was the fourth event under the Power Struggle name.

== Storylines ==
Power Struggle featured eleven professional wrestling matches that involved different wrestlers from pre-existing scripted feuds and storylines. Wrestlers portrayed villains, heroes, or less distinguishable characters in the scripted events that built tension and culminated in a wrestling match or series of matches.

The first matches for the event were revealed on October 14, 2014, the day after King of Pro-Wrestling. At King of Pro-Wrestling, A.J. Styles lost the IWGP Heavyweight Championship to Hiroshi Tanahashi, after a surprise return from NJPW original Yoshitatsu, who stopped his Bullet Club stablemate Jeff Jarrett from interfering in the match. The day after Styles' title loss, a match between him and Yoshitatsu was announced for Power Struggle. In pre-Power Struggle interviews, Yoshitatsu was given a new "Bullet Club hunter" character with him claiming that, while working for WWE, he had grown sick of seeing employees wearing Bullet Club shirts and was now looking to eliminate the villainous stable from professional wrestling. Also on October 14, the main event for January 4, 2015, and the Wrestle Kingdom 9 in Tokyo Dome show between IWGP Heavyweight Champion Hiroshi Tanahashi and the 2014 G1 Climax winner Kazuchika Okada was made official. At Power Struggle, the two were set to face off in a tag team match, where Tanahashi would team with Kota Ibushi and Okada with his regular tag team partner Yoshi-Hashi. The third match announced for the event would see Shinsuke Nakamura defend his IWGP Intercontinental Championship against Katsuyori Shibata. The match came as a result of King of Pro-Wrestling, where Shibata and Hirooki Goto defeated Nakamura and Yoshi-Hashi in a tag team match, after which Nakamura nominated Shibata as his next challenger. Nakamura and Shibata had previously faced off in a singles match on July 21, during the 2014 G1 Climax, where Shibata was victorious. In storyline the rivalry between the two dated back to a brawl in August 2004.

On October 27, NJPW announced two more title matches for Power Struggle. In the first, Chase Owens was set to defend the NWA World Junior Heavyweight Championship against Jyushin Thunder Liger. Representing the National Wrestling Alliance (NWA), Owens made his NJPW debut at King of Pro-Wrestling, successfully defending his title against Bushi. Following the match, NWA president Bruce Tharpe nominated Liger as Owens' next challenger. The NJPW junior heavyweight veteran viewed this as an opportunity at one final run as a singles champion. As part of the relationship between NJPW and NWA, Liger had challenged Rob Conway for the NWA World Heavyweight Championship on September 29, 2013, at Destruction, but was defeated following a distraction from Tharpe. Liger had previously held the NWA World Junior Heavyweight Championship in early 1997 as one of the eight junior heavyweight titles in his "J-Crown". The second title match announced would see Tomohiro Ishii defend his NEVER Openweight Championship against Hirooki Goto. The match came as a result of a six-man tag team match on October 25, where Goto pinned Ishii for the win. Despite Goto claiming that he was only interested in Ishii, not his title, the match between the two was made with the championship on the line. Goto had recently entered a storyline, where he started leading a counterattack against the Bullet Club and Chaos stables, with the goal of revitalizing the NJPW Seikigun ("regular army"), which he represented alongside the likes of Shibata and Tanahashi. Prior to Power Struggle, Goto also tried to recruit Togi Makabe as part of his movement, which he dubbed "Revolution". Ishii, Nakamura and Okada, meanwhile, all represent Chaos.

The rest of the matches were announced on November 4, following the conclusion of the 2014 Super Jr. Tag Tournament. Four matches at Power Struggle stemmed from the tournament, including two title matches. In the first, the tournament's winning team, reDRagon (Bobby Fish and Kyle O'Reilly), were set to challenge Time Splitters (Alex Shelley and Kushida) for the IWGP Junior Heavyweight Tag Team Championship. reDRagon represented the American Ring of Honor (ROH) promotion and made their NJPW debut during the previous May's events co-produced by NJPW and ROH in Toronto and New York City. This match was a rematch from August 10, when Time Splitters successfully defended their title against reDRagon in Fish and O'Reilly's Japanese debut. In the second title match, Taichi was set to challenge Ryusuke Taguchi for the IWGP Junior Heavyweight Championship. At King of Pro-Wrestling, Taguchi made his first successful title defense against Taichi's Suzuki-gun stablemate El Desperado, despite being attacked before, during and after the match by both Taichi and Taka Michinoku. On October 25, during the first round of the 2014 Super Jr. Tag Tournament, Taguchi, teaming with Consejo Mundial de Lucha Libre (CMLL) representative Fuego, faced off against the Suzuki-gun team of El Desperado and Taichi. Following outside interference from Michinoku and El Desperado hitting Taguchi with his own title belt, Taichi pinned him to win the match and afterwards demanded himself a shot at the IWGP Junior Heavyweight Championship, which was granted on November 4.

Other matches announced included a tag team match continuing the rivalry between Suzuki-gun representatives Minoru Suzuki and Takashi Iizuka and the team of Kazushi Sakuraba and Toru Yano and an eight-man tag team match, where Bad Luck Fale, Doc Gallows, Karl Anderson and Yujiro Takahashi of Bullet Club were set to face Captain New Japan, Tetsuya Naito, Togi Makabe and Tomoaki Honma. Anderson had also announced that Bullet Club would be introducing a new member at Power Struggle.

== Event ==
In the second match of the pay-per-view, Kazushi Sakuraba and Toru Yano defeated Suzuki-gun leader Minoru Suzuki and Takashi Iizuka. Sakuraba pinned Suzuki for the win with the Kido Clutch, the finishing maneuver of Universal Wrestling Federation (UWF) veteran Osamu Kido. UWF was a promotion that in the 1980s popularized shoot-style wrestling maneuvers in professional wrestling and where Suzuki had worked early in his career. Following the match, an enraged Suzuki challenged Sakuraba to an UWF-style grudge match. In the first title match of the event, Jyushin Thunder Liger defeated Chase Owens to win the NWA World Junior Heavyweight Championship, 17 years after he had last held it. In the second title match, Ring of Honor's World Tag Team Champions reDRagon captured the IWGP Junior Heavyweight Tag Team Championship from Time Splitters, who failed in their fourth title defense. This marked the third year in a row when the Super Jr. Tag Tournament winner had captured the title at Power Struggle. Afterwards, reDRagon was challenged by both Forever Hooligans and The Young Bucks. In the next title match, Ryusuke Taguchi made his second successful defense of the IWGP Junior Heavyweight Championship against Taichi, despite outside interference from El Desperado and Taka Michinoku. Following the match, Bullet Club entered the arena to reveal their newest member, Kenny Omega. This marked Omega's first appearance under a NJPW contract, having joined the promotion at the start of the month. When his signing was announced on October 3, Omega dismissed the idea of joining Bullet Club, claiming that after six years of living in Japan, he no longer considered himself a gaijin and would therefore not fit in the stable of foreigners. However, now Omega claimed he had lied about loving NJPW and only wanted money and the IWGP Junior Heavyweight Championship. Taguchi agreed to defend his title against Omega.

Next up, Yoshitatsu was defeated by Bullet Club's A.J. Styles in his first NJPW match in seven years, following outside interference from Jeff Jarrett, who had accompanied Styles to the match. After the match, Jarrett hit Yoshitatsu with his signature guitar, leading to Hiroshi Tanahashi, Tetsuya Naito and Tomoaki Honma coming out. While Tanahashi and Honma helped Yoshitatsu backstage, Naito confronted Styles. In the fourth title match of the event, Tomohiro Ishii made his first successful defense of the NEVER Openweight Championship against Hirooki Goto. After the match, Togi Makabe, who had accompanied Goto for the match, stepped up as the next challenger for the title. In the semi-main event of the evening, Hiroshi Tanahashi and Kota Ibushi defeated Chaos' Kazuchika Okada and Yoshi-Hashi, when Ibushi pinned Yoshi-Hashi for the win. Finally, in the main event, Shinsuke Nakamura made his first successful defense of the IWGP Intercontinental Championship against Katsuyori Shibata. The event concluded with Kota Ibushi entering the ring and performing a German suplex on the much larger Nakamura, before challenging him to a match for the IWGP Intercontinental Championship.

== Reception ==
Dave Meltzer of the Wrestling Observer Newsletter called the match between Ishii and Goto a "match of the year candidate", only criticizing the decision to hold it at Power Struggle instead of the Tokyo Dome, claiming that it "can't be topped" by the teased match between Ishii and Makabe. Regarding the main event, Meltzer wrote that it was "missing something" and that it "[c]ouldn't hold a candle" to their previous G1 Climax match.

== Aftermath ==
The day after Power Struggle, Ring of Honor announced that reDRagon and Time Splitters would face each other in a rematch on December 7 at Final Battle 2014, this time contested for the former's ROH World Tag Team Championship. reDRagon went on to win that match as well. On November 10, NJPW announced five more matches for Wrestle Kingdom 9 in Tokyo Dome, stemming from Power Struggle. These were Shinsuke Nakamura defending the IWGP Intercontinental Championship against Kota Ibushi, Ryusuke Taguchi defending the IWGP Junior Heavyweight Championship against Kenny Omega, Tomohiro Ishii defending the NEVER Openweight Championship against Togi Makabe, reDRagon defending the IWGP Junior Heavyweight Tag Team Championship in a four-way match against Forever Hooligans, Time Splitters and The Young Bucks and Minoru Suzuki and Kazushi Sakuraba facing off in a match, which could only end by knockout, submission or referee stoppage. Following the events of King of Pro-Wrestling and Power Struggle, Hiroshi Tanahashi and Yoshitatsu announced they were forming a new tag team named "The World".

During his match with A.J. Styles at Power Struggle, Yoshitatsu landed awkwardly on his neck while taking the Styles Clash finishing move. After initially trying to work through the injury, he was pulled out of the 2014 World Tag League and was hospitalized, upon which it was discovered that he had two broken bones in his neck.

== Results ==
No.	Results	Stipulations	Times
1^{D}	Bushi and Máscara Dorada defeated Fuego and Tiger Mask	Tag team match	06:42
2	The Young Bucks (Matt Jackson and Nick Jackson) defeated Forever Hooligans (Alex Koslov and Rocky Romero) and Suzuki-gun (El Desperado and Taka Michinoku)	Three-way tag team match	07:33
3	Kazushi Sakuraba and Toru Yano defeated Suzuki-gun (Minoru Suzuki and Takashi Iizuka)	Tag team match	04:25
4	Jyushin Thunder Liger defeated Chase Owens (c) (with Bruce Tharpe)	Singles match for the NWA World Junior Heavyweight Championship	09:27
5	Bullet Club (Bad Luck Fale, Doc Gallows, Karl Anderson and Yujiro Takahashi) (with Shiori and Tama Tonga) defeated Captain New Japan, Tetsuya Naito, Togi Makabe and Tomoaki Honma	Eight-man tag team match	09:47
6	reDRagon (Bobby Fish and Kyle O'Reilly) defeated Time Splitters (Alex Shelley and Kushida) (c)	Tag team match for the IWGP Junior Heavyweight Tag Team Championship	17:29
7	Ryusuke Taguchi (c) defeated Taichi (with El Desperado and Taka Michinoku)	Singles match for the IWGP Junior Heavyweight Championship	15:18
8	A.J. Styles (with Jeff Jarrett and Scott D'Amore) defeated Yoshitatsu	Singles match	12:58
9	Tomohiro Ishii (c) defeated Hirooki Goto (with Togi Makabe)	Singles match for the NEVER Openweight Championship	17:15
10	Hiroshi Tanahashi and Kota Ibushi defeated Chaos (Kazuchika Okada and Yoshi-Hashi) (with Gedo)	Tag team match	15:56
11	Shinsuke Nakamura (c) defeated Katsuyori Shibata	Singles match for the IWGP Intercontinental Championship	17:05
(c) / – the champion(s) heading into the match; D / – this was a dark match
