= Power Struggle (2013) =

Professional wrestling event in Osaka, Japan

- Promotional poster for the event, featuring Hiroshi Tanahashi, Togi Makabe, Kazuchika Okada, Tetsuya Naito and Shinsuke Nakamura
- Promotion: New Japan Pro-Wrestling
- Date: November 9, 2013
- City: Osaka, Japan
- Venue: Bodymaker Colosseum
- Attendance: 6,400

Pay-per-view chronology
← Previous; King of Pro-Wrestling	Next → World Tag League

Power Struggle chronology
← Previous; 2012	Next → 2014

New Japan Pro-Wrestling events chronology
← Previous; King of Pro-Wrestling	Next → Wrestle Kingdom 8

Power Struggle (2013) was a professional wrestling pay-per-view (PPV) event promoted by New Japan Pro-Wrestling (NJPW). The event took place on November 9, 2013, in Osaka, Osaka, at the Bodymaker Colosseum and featured ten matches (including one dark match), five of which were contested for championships. It was the third event under the Power Struggle name.

== Storylines ==
Power Struggle featured ten professional wrestling matches that involved different wrestlers from pre-existing scripted feuds and storylines. Wrestlers portrayed villains, heroes, or less distinguishable characters in the scripted events that built tension and culminated in a wrestling match or series of matches.

== Event ==
The opening match of the event saw The Young Bucks (Matt Jackson and Nick Jackson), who had made their NJPW debuts just the previous month by winning the 2013 Super Jr. Tag Tournament, defeat Suzuki-gun (Taichi and Taka Michinoku) for the IWGP Junior Heavyweight Tag Team Championship. The fourth match was a two-fall three-way match for both the IWGP and the NWA World Tag Team Championship, pitting IWGP champions Tencozy (Hiroyoshi Tenzan and Satoshi Kojima) against NWA champions K.E.S. (Davey Boy Smith Jr. and Lance Archer) and the National Wrestling Alliance (NWA) team The IronGodz, made up of the debuting Jax Dane and NWA World Heavyweight Champion Rob Conway, who made his fourth NJPW appearance at the event. Tencozy was defeated in both falls, with The IronGodz taking the first to win the NWA title and K.E.S. the second to regain the IWGP title.

The event also featured former rivals Kazushi Sakuraba and Yuji Nagata teaming up for the first time to defeat Takashi Iizuka and Toru Yano en route to a match against Daniel and Rolles Gracie at Wrestle Kingdom 8 in Tokyo Dome, Hiroshi Tanahashi defeating Tomohiro Ishii in a rematch from the 2013 G1 Climax and Shinsuke Nakamura making his third successful defense of the IWGP Intercontinental Championship against Minoru Suzuki in a match, which had the added stipulation that Nakamura would have had to join Suzuki-gun had he lost the title. Post-match, Nakamura nominated Tanahashi as his next challenger, setting up the first main event match for Wrestle Kingdom 8 in Tokyo Dome. Two of the top matches of the event saw Tetsuya Naito successfully defend the NEVER Openweight Championship and his certificate for an IWGP Heavyweight Championship match against previous champion Masato Tanaka and Kazuchika Okada successfully defending the IWGP Heavyweight Championship against Karl Anderson in a rematch of the finals of the 2012 G1 Climax, setting up the second of a double main event for Wrestle Kingdom 8 in Tokyo Dome between Okada and Naito.

== Results ==
No.	Results	Stipulations	Times
1^{D}	Chaos (Alex Koslov, Rocky Romero, Yoshi-Hashi and Yujiro Takahashi) defeated Bushi, Captain New Japan, Kushida and Manabu Nakanishi	Eight-man tag team match	09:50
2	The Young Bucks (Matt Jackson and Nick Jackson) defeated Suzuki-gun (Taichi and Taka Michinoku) (c)	Tag team match for the IWGP Junior Heavyweight Tag Team Championship	09:22
3	Katsuyori Shibata defeated Tomoaki Honma	Singles match	09:43
4	Kazushi Sakuraba and Yuji Nagata defeated Crazy Ichizoku (Takashi Iizuka and Toru Yano)	Tag team match	08:08
5	The IronGodz (Jax Dane and Rob Conway) (with Bruce Tharpe) defeated K.E.S. (Davey Boy Smith Jr. and Lance Archer) (c) and Tencozy (Hiroyoshi Tenzan and Satoshi Kojima); K.E.S. (Davey Boy Smith Jr. and Lance Archer) defeated Tencozy (Hiroyoshi Tenzan and Satoshi Kojima) (c) and The IronGodz (Jax Dane and Rob Conway) (with Bruce Tharpe)	Three-way tornado tag team match; first fall for the NWA World Tag Team Championship, second for the IWGP Tag Team Championship	05:41; 03:00
6	Kota Ibushi and Togi Makabe defeated Bullet Club (Bad Luck Fale and Prince Devitt)	Tag team match	11:15
7	Hiroshi Tanahashi defeated Tomohiro Ishii	Singles match	17:38
8	Tetsuya Naito (c) defeated Masato Tanaka	Singles match for the NEVER Openweight Championship and Tokyo Dome IWGP Heavyweight Championship challenge rights certificate	15:46
9	Shinsuke Nakamura (c) defeated Minoru Suzuki	Singles match for the IWGP Intercontinental Championship; had Nakamura lost, he would have had to join Suzuki-gun	19:04
10	Kazuchika Okada (c) (with Gedo) defeated Karl Anderson (with Bad Luck Fale, Matt Jackson, Nick Jackson and Prince Devitt)	Singles match for the IWGP Heavyweight Championship	22:49
(c) / – the champion(s) heading into the match; D / – this was a dark match
