= Power Struggle (2023) =

2023 New Japan Pro-Wrestling event

- Promotional poster featuring various competitors
- Promotion: New Japan Pro-Wrestling
- Date: November 4, 2023
- City: Osaka, Japan
- Venue: Osaka Prefectural Gymnasium
- Attendance: 4,046

Event chronology
← Previous; Fighting Spirit Unleashed	Next → Lonestar Shootout

Power Struggle chronology
← Previous; 2021	Next → 2024

Power Struggle was a professional wrestling event promoted by New Japan Pro-Wrestling. It took place on November 4, 2023, in Osaka, Osaka, at the Osaka Prefectural Gymnasium. It was the twelfth event under the Power Struggle chronology.

== Storylines ==
Power Struggle featured professional wrestling matches that will involve different wrestlers from pre-existing scripted feuds and storylines. Wrestlers portrayed villains, heroes, or less distinguishable characters in the scripted events that built tension and culminated in a wrestling match or series of matches.

After retaining the IWGP United Kingdom Heavyweight Championship against Zack Sabre Jr. at Royal Quest III On October 14 at Royal Quest III, Will Ospreay called out anyone to challenge him for the title. Shota Umino then came out and accepted Ospreay's challenge which Ospreay granted Umino a title shot at Power Struggle under the condition that Great-O-Khan would face Jon Moxley, which Umino accepted.

After Hiromu Takahashi successfully defended the IWGP Junior Heavyweight Championship at Destruction in Ryōgoku, Taiji Ishimori returned and attacked Takahashi and challenged him to a match at Power Struggle.

After Chaos (Kazuchika Okada and Tomohiro Ishii) and Hiroshi Tanahashi successfully defended the NEVER Openweight 6-Man Tag Team Championship at Destruction in Ryōgoku, Ishii offered a title shot to TMDK which they accepted.

The event also featured the finals of the 2023 Super Junior Tag League. The tournament matches took place during the Road to Power Struggle tour between October 21 until November 2. On November 2, Catch 2/2 (Francesco Akira and TJP) defeated Intergalactic Jet Setters (Kushida and Kevin Knight) in the semi-finals to advanced to the finals while House of Torture (Sho and Yoshinobu Kanemaru) defeated El DespeWato (El Desperado and Master Wato) to also advance. Both teams finished the tournament with a record of six wins and three losses, setting up the finals of the tournament.

At Destruction in Ryogoku, David Finlay lost the NEVER Openweight Championship to Tama Tonga. At Royal Quest III, Finlay was pinned by Tanga Loa in a six-man tag team match. A match was scheduled between Finlay and Loa for Power Struggle.

== Event ==
The event started with a preshow match broadcast live on the NJPW World stream, in which Boltin Oleg, Ryusuke Taguchi and The DKC outmatched Dragongate's Strong Machine J, Mochizuki Jr. and Yoshiki Kato in six-man tag team action.

In the first main card bout, Callum Newman and Jeff Cobb picked up victory over Oskar Leube and Yuto Nakashima in tag team action. Next up, El Desperado and Master Wato defeated Yoh and Musashi, Robbie Eagles and Kosei Fujita), and the time's IWGP Junior Heavyweight Tag Team Champions Drilla Moloney and Clark Connors in four-way tag team action. In the fourth bout, Kevin Knight, Kushida and Tama Tonga defeated Titan, Bushi and Shingo Takagi, ahead of Tonga and Takagi's bout for the NEVER Openweight Championship which was scheduled to take place at Lonestar Shootout 2023. Next up, Tetsuya Naito and Yota Tsuji defeated Sanada and Yuya Uemura ahead of Naito, (the G1 Climax 33 winner) and Sanada's confrontation for the IWGP World Heavyweight Championship at Wrestle Kingdom 18. Next up, Bullet Club leader David Finlay defeated Guerrillas of Destiny's Tanga Loa in singles competition. Next up, Jon Moxley and Great-O-Khan collided as their first bout came up short into a double countout. Moxley then challenged O-Khan to an immediate rematch this time under the Falls Count Anywhere match rules from which Moxley came out victorious. Next up, Kazuchika Okada, Tomohiro Ishii and Hiroshi Tanahashi defeated Zack Sabre Jr., Mikey Nicholls and Shane Haste to secure the fourth consecutive defense of the NEVER Openweight 6-Man Tag Team Championship in that respective reign. At AEW Dynamite #212 on October 25, 2023, Kazuchika Okada teamed up with Chaos stablemate Orange Cassidy in a losing effort against Blackpool Combat Club's Bryan Danielson and Claudio Castagnoli. The bout concluded after Danielson submitted Okada, but at the cost of a broken arm injury. On the night of the Power Struggle event, the injured Danielson reached via video to challenge Okada for a rematch at Wrestle Kingdom 18. In the tenth bout, TJP and Francesco Akira defeated Sho and Yoshinobu Kanemaru in the finals of the 2023 Super Junior Tag League, becoming number one contenders for the IWGP Junior Heavyweight Tag Team Championship. After the bout concluded, Akira and TJP got jumped by the reigning champions Drilla Moloney and Clark Connors ahead of their Wrestle Kingdom 18 officiated confrontation. In the semi main event, Hiromu Takahashi defeated Taiji Ishimori to secure his seventh consecutive defense of the IWGP Junior Heavyweight Championship in that respective reign. After the bout ended, Takahashi called out El Desperado for a title match at Wrestle Kingdom 18, which the latter accepted.

In the main event, Will Ospreay defeated Shota Umino to secure the third consecutive defense of the IWGP United Kingdom Heavyweight Championship. After the bout concluded, Ospreay called out Jon Moxley who accompanied Umino ringside to challenge him for a further title match. David Finlay appeared and attacked both Moxley and Ospreay, and pulled out a mallet with which he destroyed both of the belts Ospreay carried to depict his championship (Note: Since Ospreay renamed the IWGP United States Heavyweight Championship as the United Kingdom Heavyweight Championship, he started carrying two belts to depict the title. One of them being the original one, and the other one being a custom made United Kingdom belt.).

== Results ==
No.	Results	Stipulations	Times
1^{P}	Boltin Oleg, The DKC and Ryusuke Taguchi defeated Strong Machine J, Mochizuki Jr. and Yoshiki Kato by submission	Six-man tag team match	6:40
2	United Empire (Callum Newman and Jeff Cobb) defeated Young Blood (Oskar Leube and Yuto Nakashima) by pinfall	Tag team match	4:41
3	El DespeWato (Master Wato and El Desperado) defeated Ichiban Sweet Boys (Kosei Fujita and Robbie Eagles), Musashi Komatsu (Yoh and Musashi) and Bullet Club War Dogs (Drilla Moloney and Clark Connors) by pinfall	Four-way tag team match	5:36
4	Intergalactic Jet Setters (Kevin Knight and Kushida) and Tama Tonga defeated Los Ingobernables de Japon (Bushi, Titan, Shingo Takagi) by pinfall	Six-man tag team match	10:55
5	Los Ingobernables de Japon (Tetsuya Naito and Yota Tsuji) defeated Just 5 Guys (Yuya Uemura and Sanada) by pinfall	Tag team match	11:10
6	David Finlay (with Gedo) defeated Tanga Loa (with Jado) by pinfall	Singles match	12:36
7	Jon Moxley vs. Great-O-Khan ended in a double countout	Singles match	1:07
8	Jon Moxley defeated Great-O-Khan by submission	Falls Count Anywhere match	14:10
9	Chaos (Kazuchika Okada and Tomohiro Ishii) and Hiroshi Tanahashi (c) defeated TMDK (Zack Sabre Jr., Mikey Nicholls and Shane Haste) by pinfall	Six-man tag team match for the NEVER Openweight 6-Man Tag Team Championship	16:15
10	Catch 2/2 (Francesco Akira and TJP) defeated House of Torture (Sho and Yoshinobu Kanemaru) by pinfall	2023 Super Junior Tag League finals	16:40
11	Hiromu Takahashi (c) defeated Taiji Ishimori by pinfall	Singles match for the IWGP Junior Heavyweight Championship (Note: This match was also for Ishimori's Ironman Heavymetalweight Championship)	20:38
12	Will Ospreay (with Callum Newman) (c) defeated Shota Umino by pinfall	Singles match for the IWGP United States Heavyweight Championship (Note: Despite Ospreay renaming the title to IWGP United Kingdom Heavyweight Championship, the match is listed as a IWGP United States Heavyweight Championship title match by NJPW.)	40:16
(c) / – the champion(s) heading into the match; P / – the match was broadcast on the pre-show
