= Power Struggle (2012) =

Professional wrestling event in Osaka, Japan

- Promotional poster for the event, featuring Hiroshi Tanahashi, Kazuchika Okada, Togi Makabe and Shinsuke Nakamura
- Promotion: New Japan Pro-Wrestling
- Date: November 11, 2012
- City: Osaka, Japan
- Venue: Bodymaker Colosseum
- Attendance: 6,600

Pay-per-view chronology
← Previous; King of Pro-Wrestling	Next → World Tag League

Power Struggle chronology
← Previous; 2011	Next → 2013

New Japan Pro-Wrestling events chronology
← Previous; King of Pro-Wrestling	Next → Wrestle Kingdom 7

Power Struggle (2012) was a professional wrestling pay-per-view (PPV) event promoted by New Japan Pro-Wrestling (NJPW). The event took place on November 11, 2012, in Osaka, Osaka, at the Bodymaker Colosseum and featured nine matches, five of which were contested for championships. It was the second event under the Power Struggle name.

== Production ==
=== Background ===
Following the success of King of Pro-Wrestling, the first NJPW pay-per-view (PPV) available on the international market, the promotion's chairman Takaaki Kidani announced that Power Struggle would also air worldwide on PPV.

=== Storylines ===
Power Struggle featured nine professional wrestling matches that involved different wrestlers from pre-existing scripted feuds and storylines. Wrestlers portrayed villains, heroes, or less distinguishable characters in the scripted events that built tension and culminated in a wrestling match or series of matches.

== Event ==
During the event both of NJPW's junior heavyweight titles changed hands; Time Splitters (Alex Shelley and Kushida), winners of the 2012 Super Jr. Tag Tournament, captured the IWGP Junior Heavyweight Tag Team Championship from the Forever Hooligans (Alex Koslov and Rocky Romero), while Prince Devitt regained the IWGP Junior Heavyweight Championship from Low Ki. Meanwhile, K.E.S. (Davey Boy Smith Jr. and Lance Archer) successfully defended the IWGP Tag Team Championship against previous champions Tencozy (Hiroyoshi Tenzan and Satoshi Kojima), and Shinsuke Nakamura successfully defended the IWGP Intercontinental Championship against Karl Anderson, after which he nominated Kazushi Sakuraba his challenger for Wrestle Kingdom 7 in Tokyo Dome. The event also saw Kazuchika Okada retain his IWGP Heavyweight Championship certificate against Hirooki Goto, while Hiroshi Tanahashi retained the title itself against Yujiro Takahashi, setting up the main event between the two for Wrestle Kingdom 7 in Tokyo Dome.

== Results ==
No.	Results	Stipulations	Times
1	Time Splitters (Alex Shelley and Kushida) defeated Forever Hooligans (Alex Koslov and Rocky Romero) (c)	Tag team match for the IWGP Junior Heavyweight Tag Team Championship	06:20
2	Chaos (Jado, Takashi Iizuka, Tomohiro Ishii, Toru Yano and Yoshi-Hashi) defeated Captain New Japan, Jyushin Thunder Liger, Manabu Nakanishi, Negro Casas and Tiger Mask	Ten-man tag team match	07:50
3	Suzuki-gun (Minoru Suzuki and Taichi) (with Taka Michinoku) defeated Ryusuke Taguchi and Yuji Nagata	Tag team match	09:53
4	K.E.S. (Davey Boy Smith Jr. and Lance Archer) (c) (with Taka Michinoku) defeated Tencozy (Hiroyoshi Tenzan and Satoshi Kojima)	Tag team match for the IWGP Tag Team Championship	13:12
5	Prince Devitt defeated Low Ki (c)	Singles match for the IWGP Junior Heavyweight Championship	13:45
6	Laughter7 (Katsuyori Shibata and Kazushi Sakuraba) defeated Always Hypers (Togi Makabe and Wataru Inoue)	Tag team match	05:26
7	Kazuchika Okada (with Gedo) defeated Hirooki Goto	Singles match for the Tokyo Dome IWGP Heavyweight Championship challenge rights certificate	15:43
8	Shinsuke Nakamura (c) defeated Karl Anderson	Singles match for the IWGP Intercontinental Championship	17:36
9	Hiroshi Tanahashi (c) defeated Yujiro Takahashi	Singles match for the IWGP Heavyweight Championship	25:06
(c) / – the champion(s) heading into the match
