= Power Struggle (2011) =

Wrestling event in Osaka, Japan

- Promotional poster for the event, featuring Shinsuke Nakamura, Toru Yano, Hirooki Goto, Togi Makabe, Tetsuya Naito and Hiroshi Tanahashi
- Promotion: New Japan Pro-Wrestling
- Date: November 12, 2011
- City: Osaka, Japan
- Venue: Osaka Prefectural Gymnasium
- Attendance: 6,000

Pay-per-view chronology
← Previous; Destruction	Next → New Japan Alive

Power Struggle chronology
← Previous; First	Next → 2012

New Japan Pro-Wrestling events chronology
← Previous; Destruction '11	Next → Wrestle Kingdom VI

Power Struggle (2011) was a professional wrestling pay-per-view (PPV) event promoted by New Japan Pro-Wrestling (NJPW). The event took place on November 12, 2011, in Osaka, Osaka, at the Osaka Prefectural Gymnasium and featured eleven matches, five of which were contested for championships. It was the first event under the Power Struggle name.

== Storylines ==
Power Struggle featured eleven professional wrestling matches that involved different wrestlers from pre-existing scripted feuds and storylines. Wrestlers portrayed villains, heroes, or less distinguishable characters in the scripted events that built tension and culminated in a wrestling match or series of matches.

== Event ==
During the event all five champions were successful in their defenses. Davey Richards, one half of the No Remorse Corps, who successfully defended the IWGP Junior Heavyweight Tag Team Championship against Kushida and Tiger Mask, challenged Prince Devitt, after he had successfully defended the IWGP Junior Heavyweight Championship against Taka Michinoku, to a future title match. The match took place on December 4 and saw Devitt emerge victorious. The semi-main event saw Bad Intentions (Giant Bernard and Karl Anderson) make their tenth successful defense of the IWGP Tag Team Championship against Suzuki-gun representatives Lance Archer and Minoru Suzuki. This would turn out to be the final successful defense of the team, which set the record not only for most defenses, but also the longest reign. In the main event, Hiroshi Tanahashi defeated Toru Yano for his ninth successful defense of the IWGP Heavyweight Championship, regaining possession of the title belt, which had been stolen by Yano.

== Results ==
No.	Results	Stipulations	Times
1	Gedo and Jado defeated Killer Rabbit and Tama Tonga	Tag team match	04:32
2	Tomoaki Honma and Wataru Inoue defeated Chaos (Hideo Saito and Takashi Iizuka)	Tag team match	03:42
3	Yuji Nagata defeated Tomohiro Ishii	Singles match	09:53
4	Suzuki-gun (Taichi and Yoshihiro Takayama) defeated Ryusuke Taguchi and Togi Makabe	Tag team match	08:39
5	No Remorse Corps (Davey Richards and Rocky Romero) (c) defeated Kushida and Tiger Mask	Tag team match for the IWGP Junior Heavyweight Tag Team Championship	12:43
6	Prince Devitt (c) defeated Taka Michinoku	Singles match for the IWGP Junior Heavyweight Championship	12:13
7	MVP and Tetsuya Naito defeated Chaos (Shinsuke Nakamura and Yujiro Takahashi)	Tag team match	12:18
8	Hiroyoshi Tenzan defeated Satoshi Kojima	Singles match	15:49
9	Masato Tanaka (c) defeated Hirooki Goto	Singles match for the IWGP Intercontinental Championship	09:51
10	Bad Intentions (Giant Bernard and Karl Anderson) (c) defeated Suzuki-gun (Lance Archer and Minoru Suzuki)	Tag team match for the IWGP Tag Team Championship	17:15
11	Hiroshi Tanahashi (c) defeated Toru Yano by submission	Singles match for the IWGP Heavyweight Championship	22:01
(c) / – the champion(s) heading into the match
