= Power Struggle (2017) =

2017 New Japan Pro-Wrestling event

- Promotional poster for the event, featuring Hiroshi Tanahashi, Kazuchika Okada, Tetsuya Naito and Kenny Omega
- Promotion: New Japan Pro-Wrestling
- Date: November 5, 2017
- City: Osaka, Japan
- Venue: Osaka Prefectural Gymnasium
- Attendance: 5,480

Event chronology
← Previous; Road to Power Struggle; Global Wars 2017	Next → Global Wars UK 2017 Night 1; Lion's Gate Project 9

Power Struggle chronology
← Previous; 2016	Next → 2018

Power Struggle (2017) was a professional wrestling event promoted by New Japan Pro-Wrestling (NJPW). The event took place on November 5, 2017, in Osaka, Osaka, at the Osaka Prefectural Gymnasium. It was the seventh event under the Power Struggle name. The event featured ten matches (including one match on the pre-show), headlined by Hiroshi Tanahashi defending the IWGP Intercontinental Championship against Kota Ibushi.

The show is notable for the promotional returns of Chris Jericho, who made his first appearance for NJPW since 1998, and Jay White, who made his return to NJPW after his excursion to the United States.

== Storylines ==
Power Struggle featured ten professional wrestling matches that involved different wrestlers from pre-existing scripted feuds and storylines. Wrestlers portrayed villains, heroes, or less distinguishable characters in the scripted events that built tension and culminated in a wrestling match or series of matches.

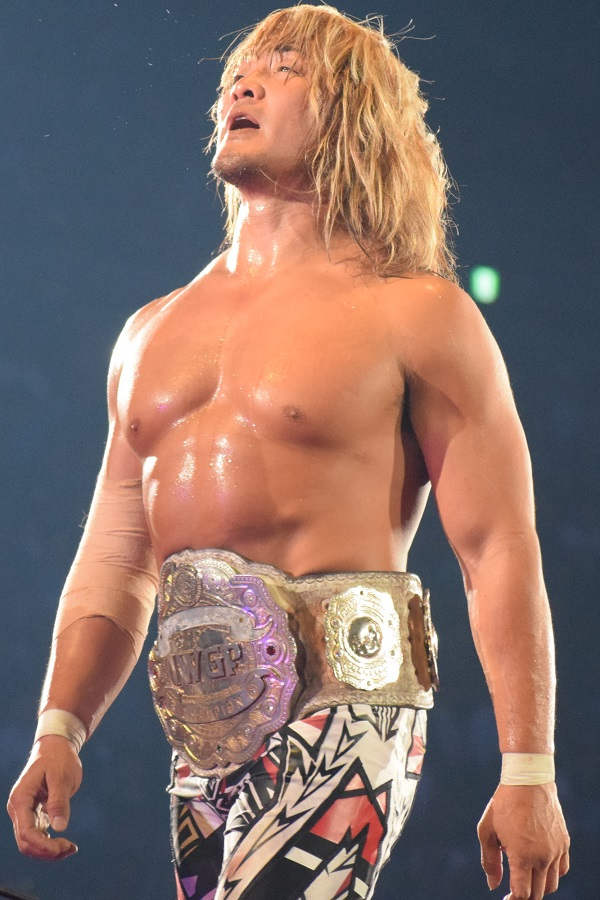
Hiroshi Tanahashi, who defended the IWGP Intercontinental Championship in the main event

Power Struggle was headlined by Hiroshi Tanahashi making his third defense of the IWGP Intercontinental Championship against Kota Ibushi. The match was set up during the 2017 G1 Climax, where Ibushi defeated Tanahashi on August 1 with his new finishing maneuver, the Kamigoye. Following the conclusion of the tournament, Tanahashi set out to avenge losses he had suffered during the tournament. After successfully defending his IWGP Intercontinental Championship on September 16 at Destruction in Hiroshima against Zack Sabre Jr., another wrestler who had defeated him, Tanahashi called out Kota Ibushi, offering him the next title opportunity. Ibushi accepted and the match was officially announced on October 10.

In the semi-main event of the show, Kenny Omega would make his third defense of the IWGP United States Heavyweight Championship against Beretta. The match was set up on October 29, when Beretta, having recently joined NJPW's heavyweight ranks, challenged Omega, who accepted. Omega did not take the former junior heavyweight as a serious threat to his title and was already focusing on setting up his match at January's Wrestle Kingdom 12 in Tokyo Dome. The match was officially announced two days later.

In the IWGP Junior Heavyweight Championship match, Will Ospreay was set to make his first title defense against Marty Scurll. On October 9 at King of Pro-Wrestling, Ospreay ended a four-match losing streak against Kushida and defeated him to become the new IWGP Junior Heavyweight Champion, becoming the first Briton to win the title. After the match, Hiromu Takahashi entered the ring to seemingly challenge Ospreay, but before he could do so, Marty Scurll came out, "snapped" Takahashi's fingers and made his own challenge to his compatriot Ospreay, which was accepted by the champion. The match was officially announced the following day. Ospreay and Scurll faced off during the 2017 Best of the Super Juniors tournament, where Scurll was victorious in his NJPW debut match.

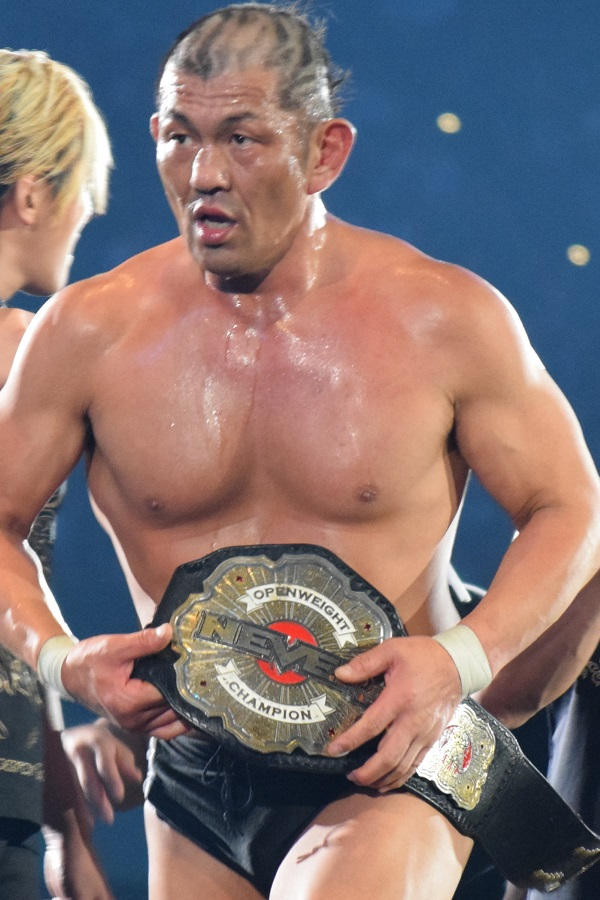
Minoru Suzuki, who defended the NEVER Openweight Championship in a bullrope deathmatch

The NEVER Openweight Championship would also be defended at Power Struggle with defending champion Minoru Suzuki making his fourth defense against challenger Toru Yano in a bullrope deathmatch. The two had been engaged in what has been called a "seemingly endless feud" since 2013, when Yano scored his first upset win over Suzuki in the 2013 New Japan Cup. Since then Yano has scored multiple wins over Suzuki with one long-term story involving Suzuki's inability to defeat his rival during NJPW's premier tournament, the G1 Climax. During the 2017 edition of the tournament, Yano again defeated Suzuki after tying him up with tape, which put him in line for a shot at Suzuki's NEVER Openweight Championship. At King of Pro-Wrestling, Suzuki teamed with his Suzuki-gun stablemate Zack Sabre Jr. to take on Yano and his Chaos stablemate Hirooki Goto. After scoring a countout win over Suzuki, Yano took his rival's championship belt and fled the arena with it. Backstage, an irate Suzuki requested a bullrope deathmatch against Yano, which was officially announced the following day.

The event would also feature the final of the 2017 Super Jr. Tag Tournament. The first round and semifinals of the tournament took place in October. Roppongi 3K (Sho and Yoh), the reigning IWGP Junior Heavyweight Tag Team Champions, earned their spot in the final by defeating Hirai Kawato and Kushida and Los Ingobernables de Japón (Bushi and Hiromu Takahashi), while newcomer team Super 69 (A. C. H. and Ryusuke Taguchi) advanced with wins over two Suzuki-gun teams; Taichi and Taka Michinoku as well as El Desperado and Yoshinobu Kanemaru.

IWGP Heavyweight Champion Kazuchika Okada and his number one contender Tetsuya Naito, who were set to headline Wrestle Kingdom 12 in Tokyo Dome, would meet at Power Struggle in a ten-man tag team match, where Okada would team with his Chaos stablemates, while Naito would team with fellow members of Los Ingobernabes de Japon.

The event was also set to feature the debut of an individual dubbed "Switchblade", who had been featured in vignettes since the 2017 G1 Climax. The previous year, NJPW had done a similar deal with vignettes hyping "Time Bomb", who was revealed as Hiromu Takahashi at the 2016 Power Struggle.

== Event ==
The event featured one title switch, where Marty Scurll defeated Will Ospreay to become the new IWGP Junior Heavyweight Champion and afterwards accepted challenges from not only Ospreay, but also Hiromu Takahashi and Kushida, announcing a four-way match for the title. The event also featured a surprise appearance by Chris Jericho, who challenged Kenny Omega to a match at Wrestle Kingdom 12 in Tokyo Dome. The challenge was immediately accepted by Omega. This marked Jericho's first NJPW appearance since September 23, 1998. Following the main event, where Hiroshi Tanahashi successfully defended the IWGP Intercontinental Championship against Kota Ibushi, "Switchblade" was revealed as Jay White, who was making his return from an overseas excursion. He confronted Tanahashi and challenged him to an IWGP Intercontinental Championship match at Wrestle Kingdom 12, before attacking and laying him out with the Bladerunner.

== Results ==
No.	Results	Stipulations	Times
1^{P}	David Finlay defeated Katsuya Kitamura	Singles match	05:32
2	The Young Bucks (Matt Jackson and Nick Jackson) defeated Dragon Lee and Titán	Tag team match	07:18
3	Hirai Kawato, Juice Robinson, Jyushin Thunder Liger, Kushida and Tiger Mask defeated Suzuki-gun (El Desperado, Taichi, Taka Michinoku, Yoshinobu Kanemaru and Zack Sabre Jr.)	Ten-man tag team match	05:19
4	Tencozy (Hiroyoshi Tenzan and Satoshi Kojima) and Togi Makabe defeated Bullet Club (Chase Owens, Cody and Yujiro Takahashi) (with P and Pieter)	Six-man tag team match	08:11
5	Roppongi 3K (Sho and Yoh) defeated Super 69 (A. C. H. and Ryusuke Taguchi)	Tag team match; final of the 2017 Super Jr. Tag Tournament	15:51
6	Chaos (Gedo, Hirooki Goto, Kazuchika Okada, Tomohiro Ishii and Yoshi-Hashi) defeated Los Ingobernables de Japón (Bushi, Evil, Hiromu Takahashi, Sanada and Tetsuya Naito)	Ten-man tag team match	12:07
7	Minoru Suzuki (c) (with El Desperado and Yoshinobu Kanemaru) defeated Toru Yano	Bullrope deathmatch for the NEVER Openweight Championship	15:21
8	Marty Scurll defeated Will Ospreay (c)	Singles match for the IWGP Junior Heavyweight Championship	17:28
9	Kenny Omega (c) (with Matt Jackson and Nick Jackson) defeated Beretta	Singles match for the IWGP United States Heavyweight Championship	21:33
10	Hiroshi Tanahashi (c) defeated Kota Ibushi	Singles match for the IWGP Intercontinental Championship	29:26
(c) / – the champion(s) heading into the match; P / – the match was broadcast on the pre-show
