= Roppongi 3K =

Japanese professional wrestling tag team

- Logo of Roppongi 3K

Tag team
- Name(s): Raijin and Fujin; Roppongi 3K; Sho Tanaka and Yohei Komatsu; The Tempura Boyz
- Members: Sho Tanaka / Raijin / Sho; Yohei Komatsu / Fujin / Yoh; Rocky Romero (manager)
- Billed heights: Sho: 173 cm (5 ft 8 in); Yoh: 171.5 cm (5 ft 7 1/2 in)
- Combined billed weight: 178 kg (392 lb)
- Debut: March 3, 2013
- Disbanded: August 16, 2021
- Years active: 2013–2021
- Trained by: NJPW Dojo

Roppongi 3K was a professional wrestling tag team consisting of Japanese wrestlers Sho and Yoh, active from 2013 to 2021 in the junior heavyweight tag team division of New Japan Pro-Wrestling (NJPW). They were managed by Rocky Romero from late 2017 until their split.

After training together in NJPW's dojo since February 2012, the two began wrestling in the federation as young lions under their full names Sho Tanaka and Yohei Komatsu in November of the same year, starting a feud with each other the following month. They became tag team partners on March 3, 2013, until the promotion sent them on an overseas learning excursion in January 2016 which notably saw them wrestle in Consejo Mundial de Lucha Libre (CMLL) under the names Raijin and Fujin, and in Ring of Honor (ROH) as The Tempura Boyz. The duo returned to NJPW as Roppongi 3K during the King of Pro-Wrestling event on October 9, 2017, now managed by Romero and a part of the Chaos stable. The name established them as the spiritual successors of Romero's team Roppongi Vice, which had amicably disbanded earlier the same day; the "3K" came from Romero's claim that Roppongi 3K were 3000 times better than Roppongi Vice.

Within their first 30 days back in NJPW, Roppongi 3K would win the IWGP Junior Heavyweight Tag Team Championship in their return match, and become the first team to win the Super Jr. Tag Tournament, NJPW's premier junior heavyweight tag team tournament, as the reigning champions. They would go on to become five-time IWGP Junior Heavyweight Tag Team Champions and win the following two editions of the Super Junior Tag League, becoming the first team (and individuals) to win it twice and later extending their record. In August 2021, during the 2021 edition of the tournament, the duo suffered a losing streak, leading to Sho turning on Yoh and disbanding the team.

== Background ==
Both Sho Tanaka and Yohei Komatsu entered the New Japan Pro-Wrestling (NJPW) dojo in February 2012 and made their debuts for the promotion the following November during the NJPW NEVER Openweight Championship Decision Tournament event, both losing to Takaaki Watanabe in singles matches (on November 15 for Tanaka, and November 19 for Komatsu). Their second match would be against each other on the first night of the Road to Tokyo Dome event on December 6, which resulted in a draw via time limit. This would mark the start of a storyline rivalry against each other during the rest of the event.

== History ==
=== New Japan Pro-Wrestling (2013–2021) ===
==== Young Lions (2013–2016) ====
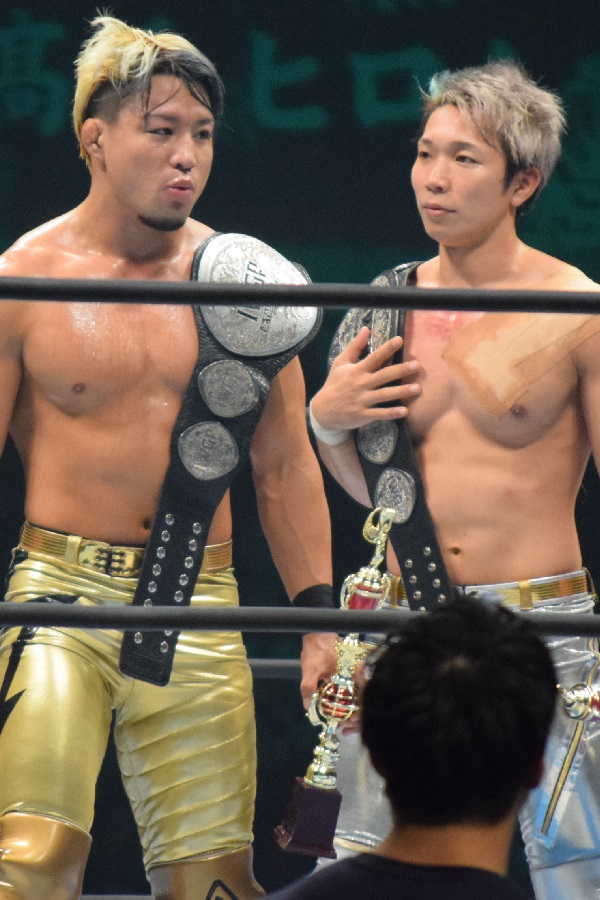
Sho (left) and Yoh (right) as the IWGP Junior Heavyweight Tag Team Champions in November 2017

Tanaka and Komatsu started wrestling as a tag team on March 3, 2013, during the Raising An Army Memorial Series event, although they would also regularly keep on feuding; after yet another feud, they would ultimately start focus on their work as a team in September 2015 during the final days of the Road to Destruction event in September 2015.

On January 6, 2016, NJPW announced that Tanaka and Komatsu would be leaving the promotion at the end of the month for an overseas learning excursion to their Mexican partner promotion Consejo Mundial de Lucha Libre (CMLL). They were the first rookies sent as a team since No Limit (Tetsuya Naito and Yujiro Takahashi) in 2009. They wrestled their NJPW farewell matches as a tag team across the six shows on the following Fantastica Mania 2016 tour, a joint event between NJPW and CMLL; their final effort was a loss in a non-title match against CMLL Arena Coliseo Tag Team Champions Guerrero Maya Jr. and The Panther on January 24, 2016.

==== Roppongi 3K (2017–2021) ====
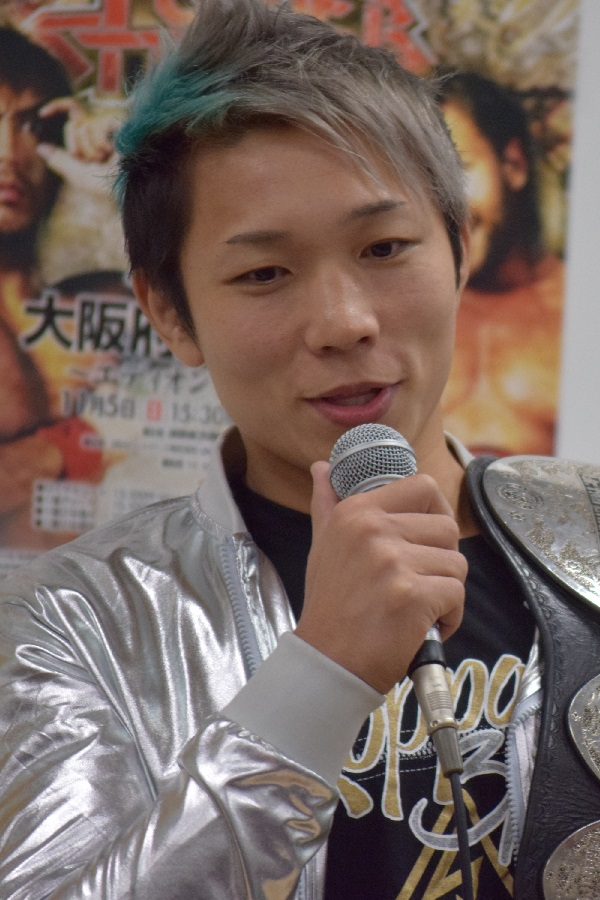
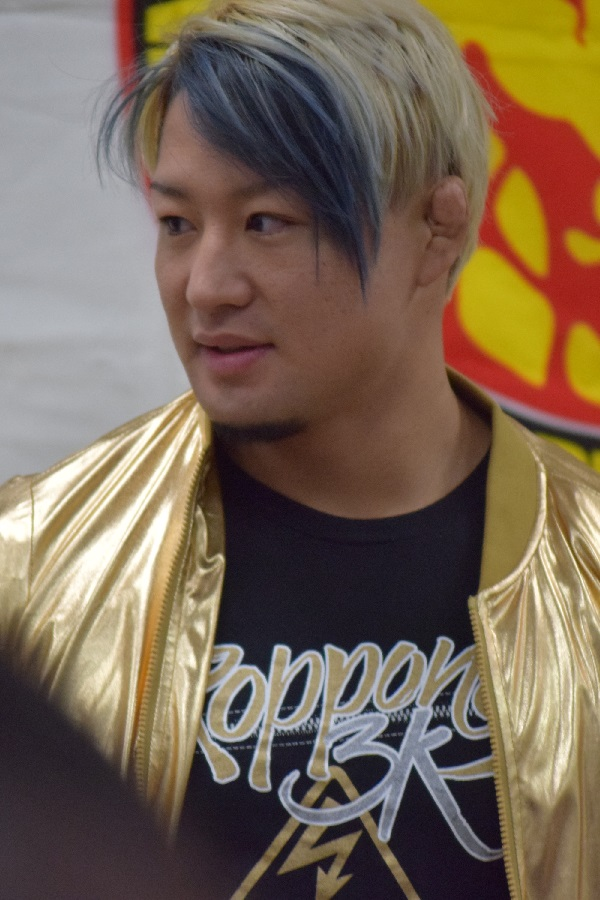
Yoh (left) and Sho (right) at a press conference in November 2017

On September 16, 2017, at NJPW's Destruction in Hiroshima show, the Roppongi Vice tag team of Beretta and Rocky Romero had their final match together before amicably splitting up. Later that night, Romero confronted IWGP Junior Heavyweight Tag Team Champions Funky Future (Ricochet and Ryusuke Taguchi), revealing that he was now the manager of a new, secret team dubbed "Roppongi 3K", with the name coming from Romero's claim that Roppongi 3K were 3000 times better than Roppongi Vice were. Even after Roppongi 3K were confirmed as the next challengers for Funky Future's titles, the identities of the two wrestlers were kept secret. On October 9 at King of Pro-Wrestling, Roppongi 3K were revealed as the returning Tanaka and Komatsu, now billed individually as "Sho" and "Yoh", who defeated Funky Future to capture the Junior Heavyweight Tag Team Championship in their return match, which was also their first title opportunity in NJPW. Through their affiliation with Romero, Sho and Yoh also became part of the Chaos stable.

Later that month, Roppongi 3K entered the 2017 Super Jr. Tag Tournament for the first time, defeating Hirai Kawato and Kushida in the first round and Los Ingobernables de Japón (Bushi and Hiromu Takahashi) in the semifinals, before defeating Super 69 (ACH and Ryusuke Taguchi) in the finals at Power Struggle on November 5, becoming the first team to win the tournament as the current Junior Heavyweight Tag Team Champions. On January 4, 2018, Roppongi 3K lost the Junior Heavyweight Tag Team Championship to The Young Bucks (Matt Jackson and Nick Jackson) at Wrestle Kingdom 12, before winning it back on January 28 at The New Beginning in Sapporo. They soon dropped the titles to Suzuki-gun (El Desperado and Yoshinobu Kanemaru) on New Japan's 46th Anniversary Show, in a three-way tag team match, which also involved Bushi and Takahashi (the latter being their former CMLL stablemate as Kamaitachi). They would then lose their title rematch on June 9 at Dominion 6.9 in Osaka-jo Hall, but would fail to regain the titles.

Sho and Yoh they entered the 2018 Super Junior Tag Tournament, which was now using a point-based system instead of brackets; they would go on to win 5 matches out of 7 and scoring 10 points; they would then face the other two top-scoring teams, Desperado/Kanemaru and Bushi/Shingo Takagi, both of Los Ingobernables de Japón, in a three-way tag team match at Power Struggle where Roppongi 3K became the first team (and individuals) to win the tournament twice. The three teams would face off again on January 4 at Wrestle Kingdom 13 for Desperado and Kanemaru's IWGP Junior Heavyweight Tag Team Championship, but Bushi and Takagi would win the match. At NJPW's 47th Anniversary Show on March 6, Roppongi 3K defeated Bushi and Takagi to win the titles for a third time, eventually losing them to Bullet Club (El Phantasmo and Taiji Ishimori) on June 16 at Kizuna Road. After Yoh pinned the Guerrillas of Destiny's Tanga Loa during a 10-man tag team match at Destruction in Kobe, Roppongi 3K received a title match for G.O.D.'s IWGP Tag Team Championship at Fighting Spirit Unleashed (their first opportunity at the title), but were unsuccessful.

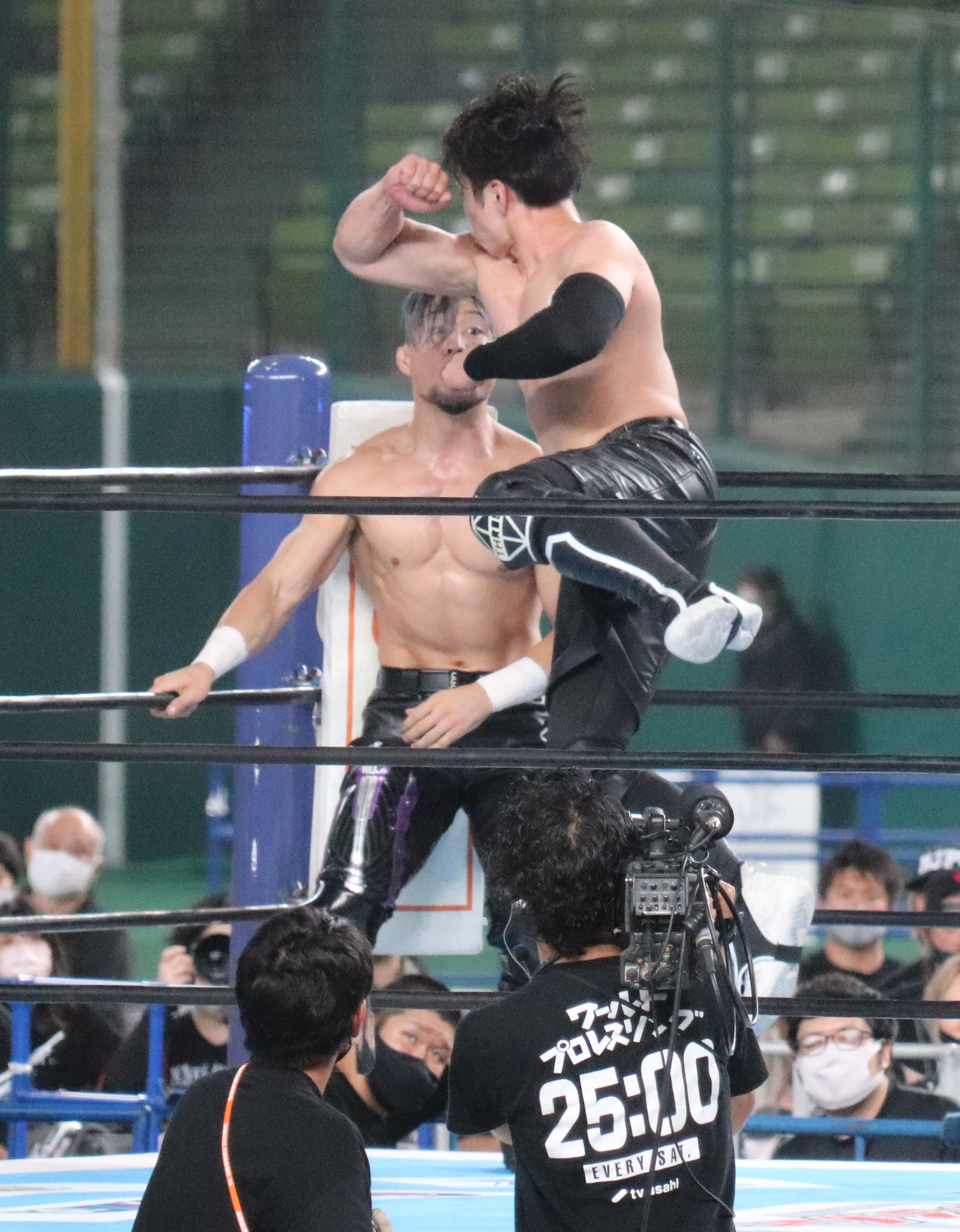
Sho and Yoh facing off against each other at Wrestle Grand Slam in MetLife Dome

Roppongi 3K entered their third Super Junior Tag Tournament in October 2019, winning five matches out of seven and scoring 10 points like the previous year to advance to the finals on November 3 at Power Struggle, where they defeated Suzuki-gun (El Desperado and Yoshinobu Kanemaru) to become the first three-time winners of the tournament. As the result, they received a match for the IWGP Junior Heavyweight Tag Team Championship against Bullet Club (El Phantasmo and Taiji Ishimori) on January 5, 2020, at Wrestle Kingdom 14; they were successful at the event, becoming four-time champions and gaining their first win at Wrestle Kingdom. However, during the New Japan Cup of 2020, Yoh injured his knee in a tournament match against Bushi and both had to relinquish their championships. While Yoh was away, Sho was making a lot of impact by himself, disputing the NEVER Openweight Championship against Shingo Takagi, the vacated NEVER Openweight 6-Man Tag Team Championship and even the IWGP Junior Heavyweight Championship against Hiromu Takahashi.

When Yoh returned in March 2021, he focused on teaming with his partner again to regain the titles they never lost from then-champions Desperado and Kanemaru. On April 4 at Sakura Genesis, Roppongi 3K regained their belts by defeating Desperado and Kanemaru. However, on June 23, they once again lost the belts to the very same team they dropped them to two years prior, Phantasmo and Ishimori. This initiated friction between the two, due to Yoh getting pinned in every match they were involved. It all came to a head on August 16, when the team was shockingly eliminated following an 0–3 start at the Super Junior Tag League (with Yoh once again getting pinned or submitting in every match) and after another loss to Desperado and Kanemaru, Sho attacked Yoh, ending their eight-year partnership. Both faced each other at Wrestle Grand Slam in MetLife Dome on September 4, where Sho defeated Yoh by submission, and after the match, it was revealed that Sho was defecting from Chaos to Bullet Club, being part of Evil's sub-group, House of Torture.

=== Consejo Mundial de Lucha Libre (2016) ===
After Komatsu and Tanaka fully transitioned to CMLL, the company redubbed them Fujin and Raijin respectively, after the Japanese gods of wind and thunder. In the Mexican promotion, Fujin and Raijin came under the guidance of Okumura, a 12-year veteran of Mexican wrestling, and Kamaitachi, a previous NJPW rookie sent to CMLL, with the four forming a new version of the La Ola Amarilla / La Fiebre Amarilla ("The Yellow Wave" / "The Yellow Fever") stable. As a trio with Kamaitachi, they were dubbed Los Kamikazes de Oriente ("The Kamikazes of the Orient"). Fujin and Raijin debuted for CMLL on February 2 in Guadalajara, making their Arena México debuts five days later. At Homenaje a Dos Leyendas, the two, together with Okumura and Kamaitachi, lost against Dragon Lee, Máscara Dorada, Místico and Valiente in a Best two-out-of-three Atómicos "Lucha Libre rules" tag team match.

During their time in Mexico, Tanaka and Komatsu also worked for other local promotions, including Desastre Total Ultraviolento (DTU) and Liga Elite.

=== Ring of Honor (2016–2017) ===
Tanaka and Komatsu remained in Mexico until September 2016, when they relocated to the United States where they resumed using the individual names of Sho Tanaka and Yohei Komatsu, while taking on the monicker of "The Tempura Boyz" as a team; they most prominently worked in Ring of Honor (ROH) during that time. They would lose their debut match against Colt Cabana and Dalton Castle on October 1 tapings before going on to lose to Cheeseburger and Will Ferrara and The All Night Express on the first and second nights of the Glory By Honor XV event respectively. They would unsuccessfully challenge The Young Bucks for the ROH World Tag Team Championship on January 14, 2017, and again on June 3, before teaming up with Canaba to unsuccessfully try to capture the ROH World Six-Man Tag Team Championship from Dalton Castle and The Boys. On June 18, they defeated Xyberhawx2000 as a part of the Chikara event The Johnny Kidd Invitational 2017. In July 2017, Tanaka and Komatsu took part in NJPW's two-day G1 Special in USA event that the promotion held in Long Beach, California. The following week, they traveled with the NJPW crew to take part in an event held by Revolution Pro Wrestling (RevPro) in London, England.

== Championships and accomplishments ==
- Pro Wrestling Illustrated
  - Ranked No. 10 of the top 50 Tag Teams in the PWI Tag Team 50 in 2020
- New Japan Pro-Wrestling
  - IWGP Junior Heavyweight Tag Team Championship (5 times)
  - Super Jr. Tag Tournament/Super Junior Tag League (2017, 2018, 2019)

== See also ==
- Chaos
- La Ola Amarilla
- Roppongi Vice
