= Power Struggle (2020) =

2020 New Japan Pro-Wrestling event

- Promotional poster of the event
- Promotion: New Japan Pro-Wrestling
- Date: November 7, 2020
- City: Osaka, Japan
- Venue: Osaka Prefectural Gymnasium
- Attendance: 2,834

Event chronology
← Previous; Fighting Spirit Unleashed; Road to Power Struggle	Next → World Tag League/Best of the Super Jr. 27; Wrestle Kingdom 15

Power Struggle chronology
← Previous; 2019	Next → 2021

Power Struggle was a professional wrestling event promoted by New Japan Pro-Wrestling (NJPW). It took place on November 7, 2020, in Osaka, Osaka, at the Osaka Prefectural Gymnasium. It was the tenth event under the Power Struggle name.

== Storylines ==
Power Struggle features six professional wrestling matches that involve wrestlers from pre-existing scripted feuds and storylines. Wrestlers portray villains, heroes, or less distinguishable characters in the scripted events that build tension and culminate in matches.

== Results ==
No.	Results	Stipulations	Times
1	Toru Yano defeated Zack Sabre Jr. by countout	No corner pads match to determine the provisional KOPW 2020	12:11
2	Shingo Takagi defeated Minoru Suzuki (c)	Singles match for the NEVER Openweight Championship	18:56
3	Kazuchika Okada defeated Great-O-Khan by referee stoppage	Singles match	12:58
4	Kenta defeated Hiroshi Tanahashi by submission	Singles match for the IWGP United States Heavyweight Championship challenge rights certificate	19:57
5	Jay White (with Gedo) defeated Kota Ibushi (holder)	Singles match for the Tokyo Dome IWGP Heavyweight and IWGP Intercontinental championships challenge rights certificate	18:47
6	Tetsuya Naito (c) defeated Evil (with Dick Togo)	Singles match for both the IWGP Heavyweight Championship and the IWGP Intercontinental Championship	33:08
(c) / – the champion(s) heading into the match
