= Power Struggle (2018) =

2018 New Japan Pro-Wrestling event

- Promotional poster of the event
- Promotion: New Japan Pro-Wrestling
- Date: November 3, 2018
- City: Osaka, Japan
- Venue: Osaka Prefectural Gymnasium (Edion Arena Osaka)
- Attendance: 5,441

Event chronology
← Previous; Road to Power Struggle; King of Pro-Wrestling	Next → Lion's Break Project 1; Global Wars 2018

Power Struggle chronology
← Previous; 2017	Next → 2019

Power Struggle (2018) was a professional wrestling event promoted by New Japan Pro-Wrestling (NJPW). It took place on November 3, 2018, in Osaka, Osaka, at the Osaka Prefectural Gymnasium. It was the eighth event under the Power Struggle name.

== Storylines ==
Power Struggle featured professional wrestling matches that involved different wrestlers from pre-existing scripted feuds and storylines. Wrestlers portrayed villains, heroes, or less distinguishable characters in the scripted events that built tension and culminated in a wrestling match or series of matches.

At Dominion 6.9 in Osaka-jo Hall, Chris Jericho defeated Tetsuya Naito to win the IWGP Intercontinental Championship. After the match Jericho continued to attack Naito until Naito's Los Ingobernables de Japón stablemate Evil interfered. Jericho wouldn't be seen at NJPW events until King of Pro-Wrestling where right before Evil's match against Zack Sabre Jr., Jericho attacked Evil causing the match to be called a no contest. Backstage, Jericho challenged Evil and the match was made official.

At King of Pro-Wrestling, Will Ospreay got the pinfall victory over the NEVER Openweight Champion Taichi in a 6-Man Tag Match. With this victory Ospreay was meant to challenge Taichi for the NEVER Openweight championship, however, the match was cancelled due to Ospreay suffering an injury. Ospreay was replaced by Hirooki Goto, who Taichi beat to win the NEVER Openweight Championship.

In the 2018 New Japan Cup, Zack Sabre Jr. defeated Tetsuya Naito in a first round match. On the final night of B Block action for the G1 Climax 28, Sabre Jr. defeated Naito. At King of Pro-Wrestling, Sabre Jr. attacked Evil after he was unable to compete in his match against him, Naito then came to the aid of Evil. A match between Naito and Sabre Jr. was made.

At King of Pro-Wrestling, Jay White, Gedo, and Jado turned on Chaos and joined Bullet Club OGs. Because of this, at Power Struggle, Jay White and Bad Luck Fale took on Kazuchika Okada and Barreta of Chaos.

At King of Pro-Wrestling, Hiroshi Tanahashi successfully defended his Tokyo Dome IWGP Heavyweight Championship challenge rights certificate against Jay White and at the end of the night he confronted IWGP Heavyweight Champion Kenny Omega. At Power Struggle, Omega teamed up with his Golden Lovers teammate Kota Ibushi to face Tanahashi and David Finlay.

The Super Junior Tag Tournament 2018 was a thirteen-night professional wrestling tournament, with the final to be held at Power Struggle. Eight teams competed in a single block in order to qualify. The first team to qualify were the reigning IWGP Junior Heavyweight Tag Team Champions, Yoshinobu Kanemaru and El Desperado, winning five out of their seven block matches, followed by Los Ingobernables de Japón (Bushi and Shingo Takagi) and Roppongi 3K (Sho and Yoh), who qualified with the same number of wins.

== Results ==
No.	Results	Stipulations	Times
1	Taguchi Japan (Ryusuke Taguchi, Chris Sabin, A. C. H. and Toa Henare) defeated Jyushin Thunder Liger, Tiger Mask, Volador Jr. and Soberano Jr.	Eight-man tag team match	06:10
2	Bullet Club (Tama Tonga, Tanga Loa and Robbie Eagles) (with Jado and Taiji Ishimori) defeated Great Bash Heel (Togi Makabe and Tomoaki Honma) and Kushida	Six-man tag team match	07:39
3	Chaos (Kazuchika Okada and Beretta) defeated Bullet Club (Jay White and Bad Luck Fale) (with Gedo)	Tag team match	04:32
4	Golden☆Lovers (Kenny Omega and Kota Ibushi) defeated Taguchi Japan (Hiroshi Tanahashi and David Finlay)	Tag team match	09:47
5	Roppongi 3K (Sho and Yoh) (with Rocky Romero) defeated Suzuki-gun (Yoshinobu Kanemaru and El Desperado) and Los Ingobernables de Japón (Bushi and Shingo Takagi)	Three-way tag team match; 2018 Super Jr. Tag League final	15:55
6	Hirooki Goto defeated Taichi (c) (with Miho Abe)	Singles match for the NEVER Openweight Championship	15:02
7	Tomohiro Ishii (c) defeated Minoru Suzuki	Singles match for the British Heavyweight Championship	19:21
8	Tetsuya Naito defeated Zack Sabre Jr. (with Taka Michinoku)	Singles match	20:12
9	Chris Jericho (c) defeated Evil by submission	Singles match for the IWGP Intercontinental Championship	21:40
(c) / – the champion(s) heading into the match
