= NJPW Power Struggle =

Power Struggle
- NJPW Power Struggle logo
- Promotions: New Japan Pro-Wrestling
- First event: Power Struggle (2011)

Power Struggle is an annual professional wrestling event promoted by New Japan Pro-Wrestling (NJPW). The event has been held since 2011 and aired domestically as a pay-per-view (PPV). From 2012 to 2014, the event also aired outside Japan as an internet pay-per-view (iPPV). Since 2015, the event has aired worldwide on NJPW's internet streaming site, NJPW World. The event is held in November and is the final major event before the annual January 4 Dome Show, NJPW's biggest event of the year.

== Events ==
#	Event	Date	City	Venue	Attendance	Main event	Ref(s)
1	Power Struggle (2011)	November 12, 2011	Osaka, Japan	Osaka Prefectural Gymnasium	6,000	Hiroshi Tanahashi (c) vs. Toru Yano for the IWGP Heavyweight Championship	
2	Power Struggle (2012)	November 11, 2012	Osaka, Japan	Osaka Prefectural Gymnasium	6,600	Hiroshi Tanahashi (c) vs. Yujiro Takahashi for the IWGP Heavyweight Championship	
3	Power Struggle (2013)	November 9, 2013	Osaka, Japan	Osaka Prefectural Gymnasium	6,400	Kazuchika Okada (c) vs. Karl Anderson for the IWGP Heavyweight Championship	
4	Power Struggle (2014)	November 8, 2014	Osaka, Japan	Osaka Prefectural Gymnasium	7,500	Shinsuke Nakamura (c) vs. Katsuyori Shibata for the IWGP Intercontinental Championship	
5	Power Struggle (2015)	November 7, 2015	Osaka, Japan	Osaka Prefectural Gymnasium	5,128	Shinsuke Nakamura (c) vs. Karl Anderson for the IWGP Intercontinental Championship	
6	Power Struggle (2016)	November 5, 2016	Osaka, Japan	Osaka Prefectural Gymnasium	5,050	Tetsuya Naito (c) vs. Jay Lethal for the IWGP Intercontinental Championship	
7	Power Struggle (2017)	November 5, 2017	Osaka, Japan	Osaka Prefectural Gymnasium	5,480	Hiroshi Tanahashi (c) vs. Kota Ibushi for the IWGP Intercontinental Championship	
8	Power Struggle (2018)	November 3, 2018	Osaka, Japan	Osaka Prefectural Gymnasium	5,441	Chris Jericho (c) vs. Evil for the IWGP Intercontinental Championship	
9	Power Struggle (2019)	November 3, 2019	Osaka, Japan	Osaka Prefectural Gymnasium	5,558	Jay White (c) vs. Hirooki Goto for the IWGP Intercontinental Championship	
10	Power Struggle (2020)	November 7, 2020	Osaka, Japan	Osaka Prefectural Gymnasium	2,834	Tetsuya Naito (c) vs. Evil for the IWGP Heavyweight Championship and IWGP Intercontinental Championship	
11	Power Struggle (2021)	November 6, 2021	Osaka, Japan	Osaka Prefectural Gymnasium	2,367	Shingo Takagi (c) vs. Zack Sabre Jr. for the IWGP World Heavyweight Championship	
12	Power Struggle (2023)	November 4, 2023	Osaka, Japan	Osaka Prefectural Gymnasium	4,046	Will Ospreay (c) vs. Shota Umino for the IWGP United Kingdom Heavyweight Championship	
13	Power Struggle (2024)	November 4, 2024	Osaka, Japan	Osaka Prefectural Gymnasium	3,773	Zack Sabre Jr. (c) vs. Shingo Takagi for the IWGP World Heavyweight Championship	
14	Power Struggle (2026)	November 3, 2026	Hiroshima, Japan	Hiroshima Sun Plaza		Gabe Kidd (c) vs. Taichi for the IWGP Global Heavyweight Championship	
(c) – refers to the champion(s) heading into the match

== See also ==
- List of New Japan Pro-Wrestling pay-per-view events
