= Power Struggle (2024) =

2024 New Japan Pro-Wrestling event

- Promotional poster
- Promotion: New Japan Pro-Wrestling
- Date: November 4, 2024
- City: Osaka, Japan
- Venue: Osaka Prefectural Gymnasium
- Attendance: 3,773

Event chronology
← Previous; Royal Quest IV	Next → Fighting Spirit Unleashed

Power Struggle chronology
← Previous; 2023	Next → —

Power Struggle was a professional wrestling event promoted by New Japan Pro-Wrestling. It took place on November 4, 2024, in Osaka, Osaka, at the Osaka Prefectural Gymnasium. It was the thirteenth event under the Power Struggle chronology.

== Storylines ==
Power Struggle featured professional wrestling matches that involved different wrestlers from pre-existing scripted feuds and storylines. Wrestlers portrayed villains, heroes, or less distinguishable characters in the scripted events that built tension and culminated in a wrestling match or series of matches.

== Results ==
No.	Results	Stipulations	Times
1^{P}	Ninja Mack, The DKC and Yoh defeated Shoma Kato, Capitan Suicida and Tiger Mask by pinfall	Six-man tag team match	6:55
2	Bullet Club (Gabe Kidd, Clark Connors, Drilla Moloney, Robbie X and Taiji Ishimori) defeated Intergalatic Jet Setters (Kevin Knight and Kushida), Katsuya Murashima, Paris De Silva and Jude London by pinfall	Ten-man tag team match	6:14
3	Los Ingobernables de Japon (Tetsuya Naito, Yota Tsuji, Bushi and Hiromu Takahashi) defeated Dragon Dia, Ryusuke Taguchi, Tomoaki Honma and Toru Yano by submission	Eight-man tag team match	7:02
4	House of Torture (Evil and Ren Narita) defeated Hiroshi Tanahashi and Boltin Oleg by pinfall	Tag team match	7:26
5	Shota Umino defeated Sanada by pinfall	Singles match	16:41
6	United Empire (Great-O-Khan and Henare) defeated TMDK (Mikey Nicholls and Shane Haste) (c) by pinfall	Tag team match for IWGP Tag Team Championship	11:11
7	TMDK (Robbie Eagles and Kosei Fujita) defeated Catch 2/2 (TJP and Francesco Akira) by pinfall	2024 Super Junior Tag League finals	15:20
8	Douki (c) defeated Master Wato by referee stoppage	Singles match for the IWGP Junior Heavyweight Championship	22:07
9	David Finlay (c) defeated Taichi by pinfall	Singles match for the IWGP Global Heavyweight Championship	23:22
10	Zack Sabre Jr. (c) defeated Shingo Takagi by pinfall	Singles match for the IWGP World Heavyweight Championship	29:28
(c) / – the champion(s) heading into the match; P / – the match was broadcast on the pre-show
