= Power Struggle (2021) =

2021 New Japan Pro-Wrestling event

- Promotional art work of the event
- Promotion: New Japan Pro-Wrestling
- Date: November 6, 2021
- City: Osaka, Japan
- Venue: Osaka Prefectural Gymnasium
- Attendance: 2,367

Event chronology
← Previous; G1 Climax 31; Road to Power Struggle	Next → World Tag League/Best of the Super Jr. 28; Battle in the Valley

Power Struggle chronology
← Previous; 2020	Next → 2023

Power Struggle was a professional wrestling event promoted by New Japan Pro-Wrestling. It took place on November 6, 2021, in Osaka, Osaka, at the Osaka Prefectural Gymnasium. It was the eleventh event under the Power Struggle chronology.

== Storylines ==
Other on-screen personnel
Role:	Name:
English Commentators	Kevin Kelly
English Commentators	Chris Charlton
English Commentators	Rocky Romero
Japanese Commentators	Shinpei Nogami
Japanese Commentators	Milano Collection A.T.
Japanese Commentators	Katsuhiko Kanazawa
Japanese Commentators	Kazuyoshi Sakai
Japanese Commentators	Togi Makabe
Japanese Commentators	Miki Motoi
Japanese Commentators	Jushin Thunder Liger
Japanese Commentators	Masahiro Chono
Ring announcers	Makoto Abe
Ring announcers	Kimihiko Ozaki
Referees	Kenta Sato
Referees	Marty Asami
Referees	Red Shoes Unno

Power Struggle featured professional wrestling matches that involved different wrestlers from pre-existing scripted feuds and storylines. Wrestlers portrayed villains, heroes, or less distinguishable characters in the scripted events that built tension and culminated in a wrestling match or series of matches.

== Results ==
No.	Results	Stipulations	Times
1	Suzuki-gun (Douki and Yoshinobu Kanemaru) defeated Kosei Fujita and Ryohei Oiwa by submission	Tag team match	4:33
2	Bullet Club (Tanga Loa, Jado & Gedo) defeated Tiger Mask and Great Bash Heel (Tomoaki Honma and Togi Makabe)	Six-man tag team match	5:07
3	Los Ingobernables de Japón (Hiromu Takahashi, Bushi and Sanada) defeated Master Wato, Ryusuke Taguchi and Yuji Nagata	Six-man tag team match	7:05
4	House of Torture (Sho, Yujiro Takahashi and Evil) (with Dick Togo) defeated Chaos (Yoshi-Hashi, Tomohiro Ishii and Hirooki Goto) (c)	Six-man tag team match for the NEVER Openweight 6-Man Tag Team Championship	13:46
5	Toru Yano (c) defeated Great-O-Khan	Amateur Rules match for the provisional KOPW 2021 Trophy	6:00
6	El Desperado defeated Robbie Eagles (c) by submission	Singles match for the IWGP Junior Heavyweight Championship	18:20
7	Kenta defeated Hiroshi Tanahashi (c)	Singles match for the IWGP United States Heavyweight Championship	23:44
8	Kazuchika Okada (certificate holder) defeated Tama Tonga (with Jado)	Singles match for the Tokyo Dome IWGP World Heavyweight Championship challenge rights certificate	25:13
9	Shingo Takagi (c) defeated Zack Sabre Jr.	Singles match for the IWGP World Heavyweight Championship	30:27
(c) / – the champion(s) heading into the match
