= Captain New Japan =

Japanese professional wrestler (born 1982)

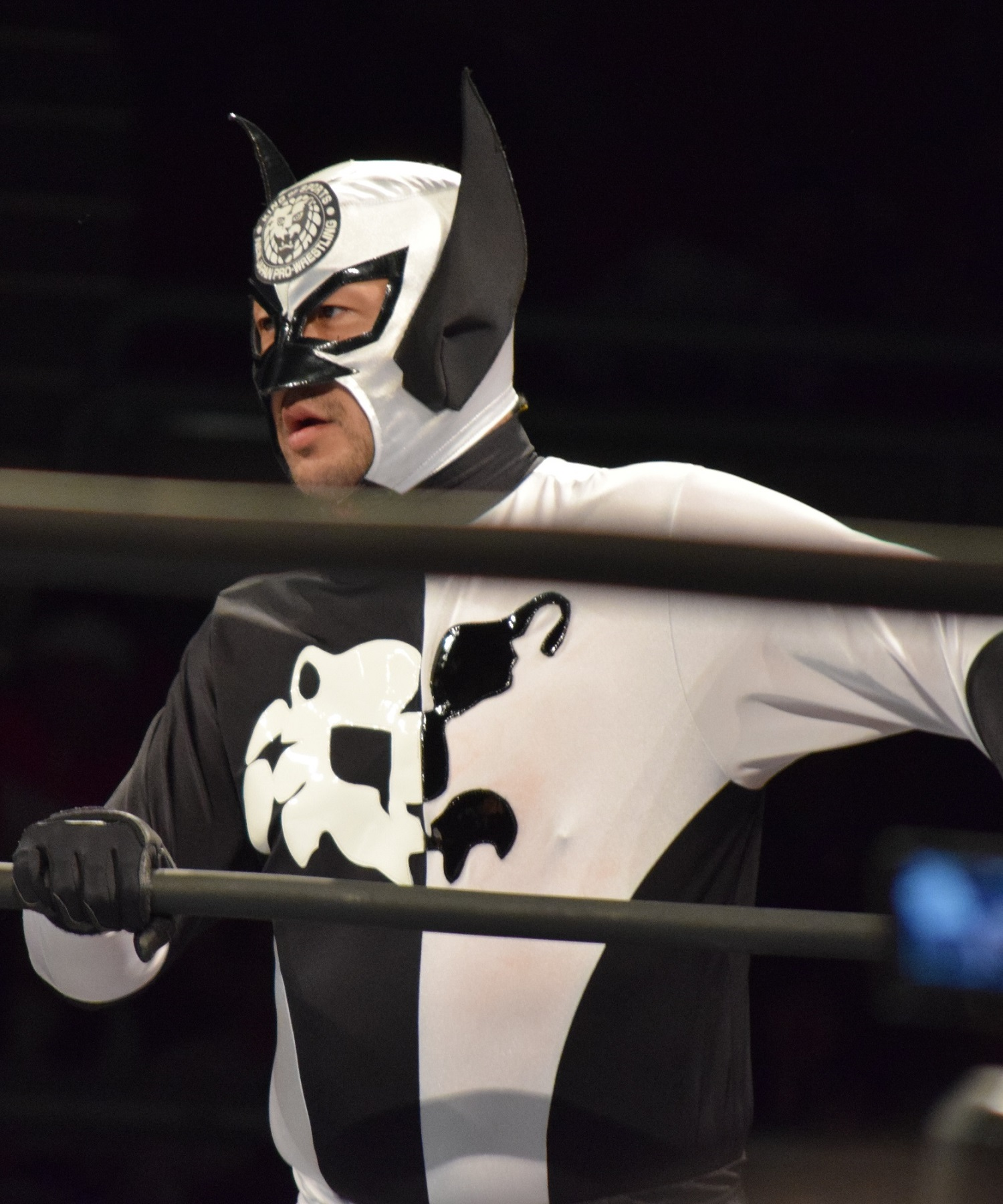
- Hirasawa as Captain New Japan in March 2016

Personal information
- Born: Mitsuhide Hirasawa; 27 March 1982 (age 44) Sapporo, Hokkaido, Japan

Professional wrestling career
- Ring name(s): Bone Soldier; Captain New Japan; Captain Taiwan; Hideo Saito; Mitsuhide Hirasawa
- Billed height: 1.87 m (6 ft 1 1/2 in)
- Billed weight: 104 kg (229 lb)
- Trained by: Takashi Iizuka
- Debut: 28 January 2006
- Retired: 5 January 2017

Mitsuhide Hirasawa (平澤 光秀, Hirasawa Mitsuhide; born 27 March 1982) is a Japanese former professional wrestler. He is best known for his two stints with New Japan Pro-Wrestling (NJPW) and a brief stint with World Wrestling Council (WWC).

Hirasawa wrestled as a jobber, under the mask superhero, Captain New Japan (キャプテン・ニュージャパン, Kyaputen Nyū Japan). He has also worked under another mask as Bone Soldier, and unmasked under his real name, as well as the ring name Hideo Saito (ヒデオ・サイトー, Hideo Saitō). He is also known for his brief tenure with New Japan's stables Chaos and Bullet Club, but was kicked out for his poor performance.

== Early life ==
Prior to becoming a professional wrestler, Hirasawa was a freestyle amateur wrestler, taking part in the 1996 and 1998 World Championships as a cadet and the 2001 World Championship as a junior, and also saw Hiroshi Hase as an idol when he was younger. His father, Mitsushi Hirasawa, was friends with Riki Choshu from very old times. He joined the New Japan dojo in March 2005 under the guidance of Choshu, Takashi Iizuka and Hiroyoshi Tenzan.

== Professional wrestling career ==
=== New Japan Pro-Wrestling (2006–2010) ===
Hirasawa originally debuted for New Japan Pro-Wrestling (NJPW) on 28 January 2006, losing to his mentor Takashi Iizuka. Hirasawa would wrestle on the NJPW undercards, mostly losing which is custom for new wrestlers in NJPW. His first win would come on 26 April, defeating the two-year pro Yujiro Takahashi. Hirasawa teamed up with Ryusuke Taguchi to participate in his first tournament, the National Area Tag League 2006 where they were placed in block C and lost both of their matches. Hirasawa would make several appearances for Pro Wrestling Zero1, the most notable of which was when he and Manabu Nakanishi participated in the Passion Cup Tag Tournament 2008. In late 2008, Hirasawa would form a tag team with Yuji Nagata, which would be a precursor to Seigigun ("Blue Justice Army"). The pair participated in the 2008 G1 Tag League block B, they would only gain a single point when they drew with Manabu Nakanishi and Yutaka Yoshie. In the fall of 2009, Hirasawa joined Yuji Nagata's new Seigigun stable, along with Wataru Inoue and Super Strong Machine. At Wrestle Kingdom IV in Tokyo Dome, Hirasawa, along with Inoue and Super Strong Machine defeated Jyushin Thunder Liger, Koji Kanemoto, and Kazuchika Okada in the opening match. Even with joining this stable, Hirasawa largely continued in the midcard largely serving as the fall guy in tag match. On 28 June, Seigigun entered a six-man tag tournament with Nagata, Inoue, and Hirasawa forming one team, while Machine teamed with Tonga Strong Machine and Pink Strong Machine (Yoshie). However, both teams lost. On 12 September, there was a special Mitsuhide Hirasawa farewell match, which he would lose.

=== World Wrestling Council (2010–2011) ===
After embarking on an extended tour of Puerto Rican World Wrestling Council (WWC) in September 2010, Hirasawa adopted the new ring name Hideo Saito, as a tribute to Masa Saito and Hideo Nomo. His new gimmick saw Saito have (kayfabe) personality problems, in which he would find himself portraying a lot of characters besides himself. On 25 September, Saito would win his first championship when he won a battle royal for the vacant WWC Caribbean Heavyweight Championship and would lose it on 27 November. On 19 February, he also won the WWC Puerto Rico Heavyweight Championship and lost it on 26 March. In May 2011, Saito took part in NJPW's first tour of the United States, the Invasion Tour 2011. On 13 May in Rahway, New Jersey, he entered the tournament to determine the first ever IWGP Intercontinental Champion, losing to Yujiro Takahashi in his first round match.

=== Return to NJPW and departure (2011–2017) ===
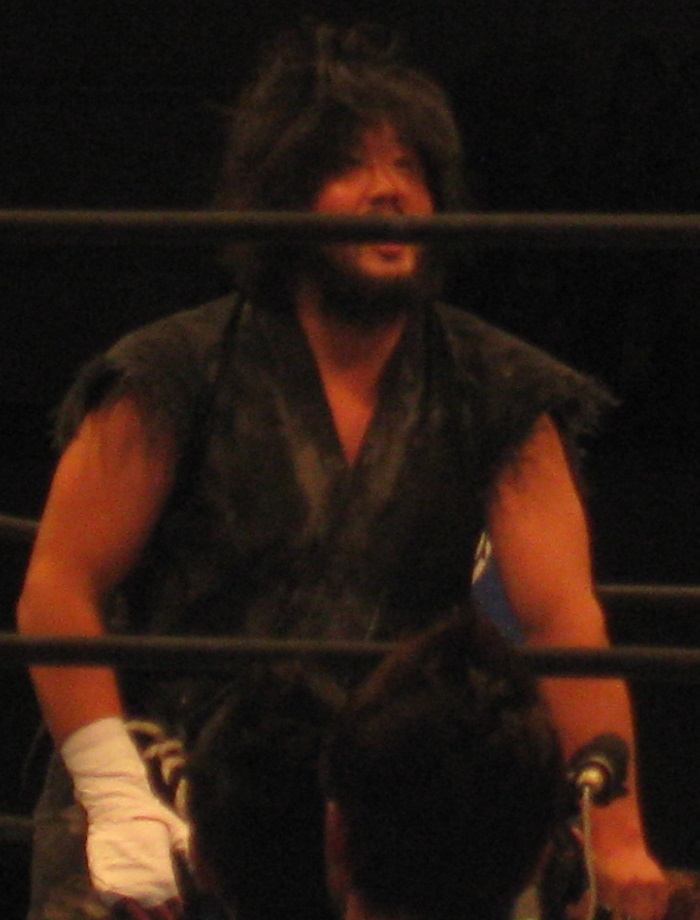
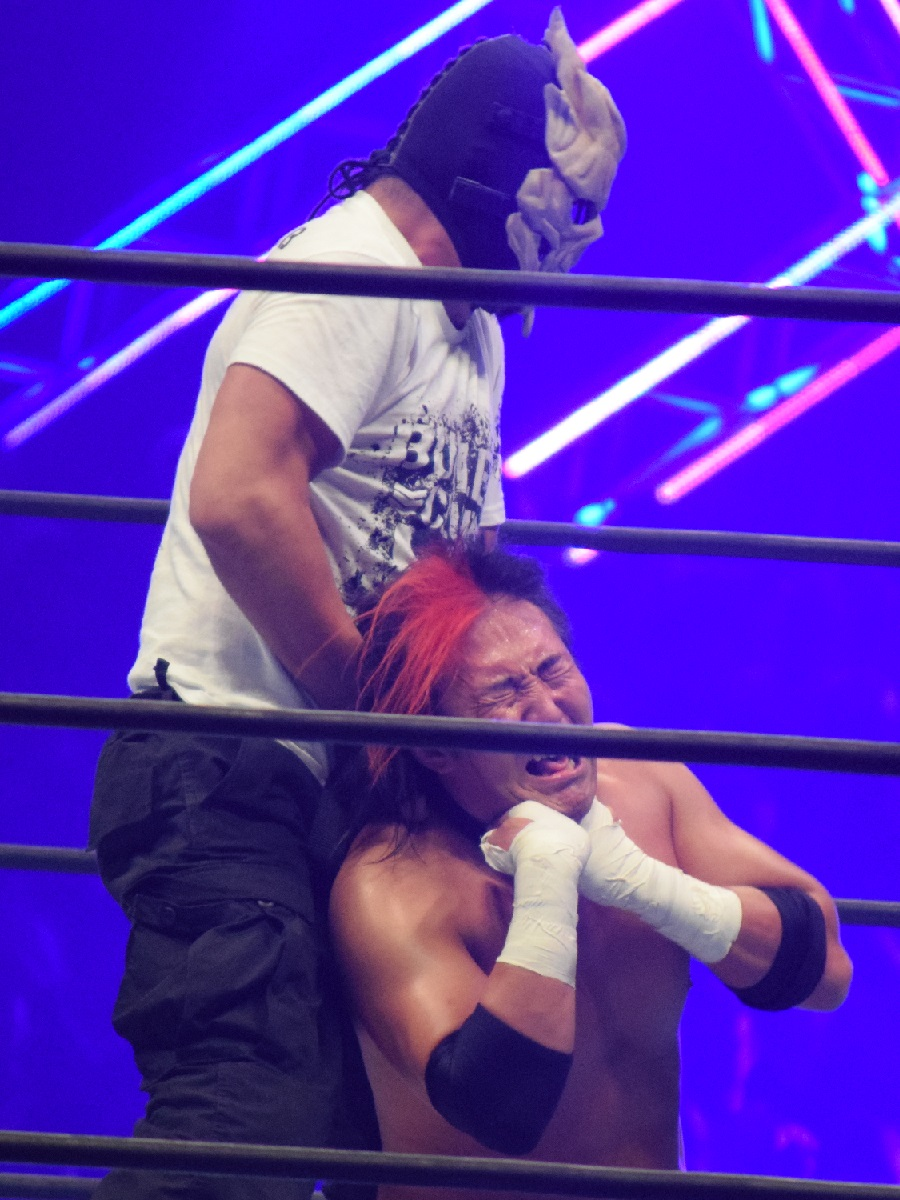
Some of Hirasawa's gimmicks during his second spell in NJPW: as Hideo Saito (left, pictured in November 2011), and as Bone Soldier (right, pictured in November 2016)

Hirasawa returned to New Japan on 18 June, now going permanently by the Saito name, and turned on Seigigun and its leader Yuji Nagata, joining Chaos. In August, Saito took part in the 2011 G1 Climax, losing his first eight matches only to pick up his opening win on the final day of the tournament in a match against former mentor, Yuji Nagata. On 19 September, Nagata defeated his former protégé in a grudge match. Saito's erratic behaviour and poor match results eventually led to the rest of Chaos kicking him out of the stable on 4 December 2011. After his exile from Chaos, Saito developed an alter-ego called "Captain New Japan", dressed in a variation of the Captain America costume, complete with a shield. In November, Captain New Japan took part in the 2012 World Tag League, teaming with IWGP Heavyweight Champion Hiroshi Tanahashi under the team name "Captain Ace". The team lost all six of their matches with Captain New Japan being pinned in each match. On 3 March 2013, Captain New Japan returned to Seigigun in an eight-man tag team match, where he, Nagata, Super Strong Machine and Wataru Inoue were defeated by Hirooki Goto, Karl Anderson, Ryusuke Taguchi and Tama Tonga. On 7 April, Captain New Japan was attacked by Bad Luck Fale and Prince Devitt and would also be unmasked by Devitt, however, his face was never shown. In response to this, Captain New Japan teamed up with Taguchi, Devitt's former Apollo 55 partner, and challenged the two at Wrestling Dontaku 2013, where they lost. Following these events, Captain New Japan fought against the newly formed Bullet Club headed by Devitt and reformed his alliance with Tanahashi. On 4 August, Captain New Japan carried Tanahashi to the ring akin to Fale and Devitt and became involved in the match-up trying to limit the effects of Fale's interference; however, Devitt would ultimately defeat Tanahashi. In November, Captain Ace reunited for the 2013 World Tag League. Much like the previous year, the team lost their first five matches, but on the final day, they finally picked up a win over Fale and Devitt, with Captain pinning Devitt, costing the Bullet Club team a spot in the semifinals.

On 13 April 2014, during NJPW's trip to Taiwan, Hirasawa, working as Captain Taiwan, received his first title shot in the promotion, when he and Hirooki Goto unsuccessfully challenged Bullet Club representatives Doc Gallows and Karl Anderson for the IWGP Tag Team Championship.

In early 2016, Captain New Japan became part of Yoshitatsu's new anti-Bullet Club stable, Hunter Club. On 12 September, Yoshitatsu, upset with Captain New Japan's poor performances, announced a Twitter poll that would decide whether he would get to stay in Hunter Club.

On 25 September at Destruction in Kobe, upon being denied a spot in Hunter Club, Captain New Japan turned on Yoshitatsu and defected to Bullet Club. The following day, Hirasawa was given the new ring name "Bone Soldier". He made his debut under the name on 8 October. The following month, Bone Soldier entered the 2016 World Tag League, teaming with Bullet Club stablemate Bad Luck Fale. The two lost all seven of their matches in the tournament, with Bone Soldier being pinned by his rival Yoshitatsu in their final match on 8 December. On 1 March 2017, Hirasawa's profile was removed from NJPW's website, confirming his departure from the company.

== Championships and accomplishments ==
- Pro Wrestling Illustrated
  - PWI ranked him #441 of the top 500 singles wrestlers in the PWI 500 in 2017
- World Wrestling Council
  - WWC Caribbean Heavyweight Championship (1 time)
  - WWC Puerto Rico Heavyweight Championship (1 time)
- Wrestling Observer Newsletter
  - Worst Gimmick (2016)
