= NEVER Openweight Championship =

Professional wrestling championship

- The NEVER Openweight Championship belt

Details
- Promotion: New Japan Pro-Wrestling (NJPW)
- Date established: November 19, 2012
- Current champion: Aaron Wolf
- Date won: June 14, 2026
Statistics
- First champion: Masato Tanaka
- Most reigns: Tomohiro Ishii (6 reigns)
- Longest reign: Masato Tanaka (314 days)
- Shortest reign: Michael Elgin (8 days)
- Oldest champion: Minoru Suzuki (52 years, 2 months and 12 days)
- Youngest champion: Will Ospreay (25 years, 7 months and 28 days)
- Heaviest champion: Jeff Cobb (120 kg (260 lb))
- Lightest champion: Kenta (85 kg (187 lb))

The NEVER Openweight Championship (NEVER無差別級王座, NEVER musabetsu-kyū ōza) is a professional wrestling championship owned by the New Japan Pro-Wrestling (NJPW) promotion. NEVER is an acronym of the terms "New Blood", "Evolution", "Valiantly", "Eternal", and "Radical" and was an NJPW-promoted series of events, which featured younger up-and-coming talent and outside wrestlers not signed to the promotion. The project was officially announced on July 12, 2010, and held its first event on August 24, 2010. On October 5, 2012, NJPW announced that NEVER was going to get its own championship, the NEVER Openweight Championship. Aaron Wolf is the current champion in his second reign. He won the title by defeating Ren Narita at Dominion 6.14 in Osaka-jo Hall in Osaka, Japan, on June 14, 2026.

The title was originally scheduled to be defended exclusively at NEVER events, but this plan was quickly changed and since its foundation, the title has been defended on the undercards of NJPW events. The original concept of having younger workers wrestle for the title has also not been realized with the first seven holders of the title having been in their thirties or forties. Instead, through the likes of Katsuyori Shibata, Togi Makabe, and Tomohiro Ishii, the NEVER Openweight Championship became known for its "gritty" title matches and "hard hitting" style. Though named an "openweight" championship, NJPW has also categorized the title as a heavyweight title. The title forms what has unofficially been called the "New Japan Triple Crown" (新日本トリプルクラウン, Shin Nihon Toripuru Kuraun) along with the IWGP Heavyweight Championship and the IWGP Intercontinental Championship. The title's openweight nature means that both heavyweight and junior heavyweight wrestlers are eligible to challenge for it.

== History ==
On October 5, 2012, over two years after the founding of NEVER, New Japan Pro-Wrestling announced the creation of the project's first championship, the NEVER Openweight Championship. The title was originally created with the idea of using it to "elevate younger wrestlers".

== Inaugural championship tournament (2012) ==
The first champion was to be determined in a sixteen-man single-elimination tournament, which was set to take place November 15 and 19, 2012. The title and the tournament were announced by New Japan president Naoki Sugabayashi and NEVER regular Tetsuya Naito, who was scheduled to enter the tournament, but was forced to pull out after suffering a knee injury. Much like regular NEVER events, the tournament also featured wrestlers not signed to New Japan; freelancer Daisuke Sasaki, Hiro Tonai, Kengo Mashimo, Ryuichi Sekine, Shiori Asahi and Taishi Takizawa from Kaientai Dojo, and Masato Tanaka from Pro Wrestling Zero1. In the final of the tournament, Tanaka, the 39-year-old, who, despite officially being affiliated with Pro Wrestling Zero1, had worked for NJPW regularly since August 2009, defeated Karl Anderson to become the inaugural NEVER Openweight Champion. Though the title was originally designed to be defended at NEVER events, NJPW has not held a single NEVER event since the championship tournament.

=== Tournament bracket ===
First round (November 15)
Karl Anderson	Pin
Yujiro Takahashi	11:12
Hiromu Takahashi	06:14
Shiori Asahi	Pin
Ryusuke Taguchi	Pin
Hiro Tonai	08:19
Bushi	08:02
Kengo Mashimo	Pin
Kushida	13:02
Masato Tanaka	Pin
Captain New Japan	07:22
Taishi Takizawa	Pin
Tomohiro Ishii	Pin
Daisuke Sasaki	08:39
Yoshi-Hashi	Pin
Ryuichi Sekine	07:14

Second round (November 19)
Karl Anderson	Pin
Shiori Asahi	03:59
Ryusuke Taguchi	07:54
Kengo Mashimo	Sub
Masato Tanaka	Pin
Taishi Takizawa	04:28
Tomohiro Ishii	Pin
Yoshi-Hashi	06:57

Semifinals (November 19)
Karl Anderson	Pin
Kengo Mashimo	06:14
Masato Tanaka	Pin
Tomohiro Ishii	10:47

Final (November 19)
Karl Anderson	15:12
Masato Tanaka	Pin

== Reigns ==
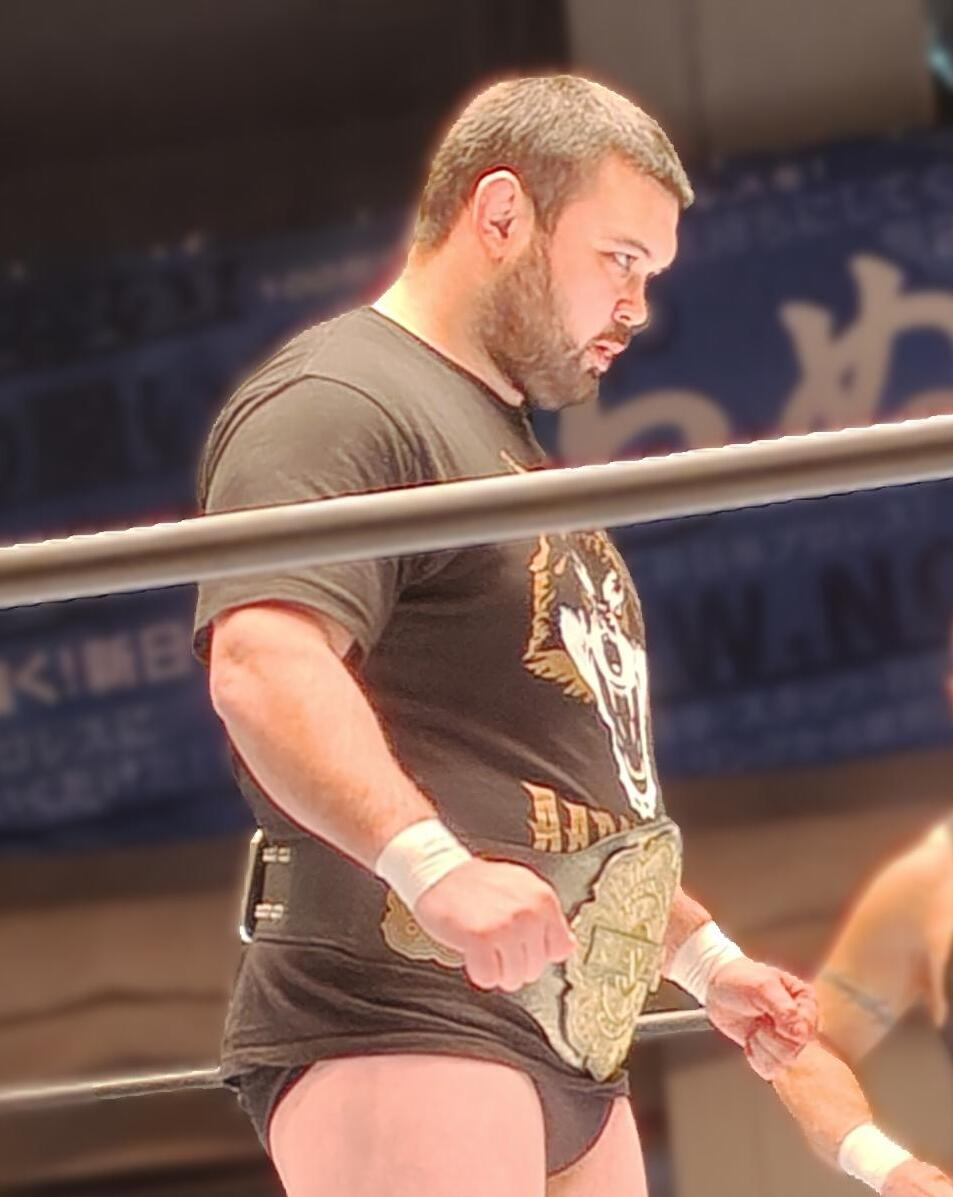
Two-time and current champion Aaron Wolf

As of June 18, 2026, there have been 52 reigns shared among 26 wrestlers with one vacancy. Masato Tanaka was the first champion in the title's history. He also holds the record for the longest reign at 314 days during his only reign. Tomohiro Ishii has the most reigns with six. Michael Elgin's only reign of 8 days is the shortest in the title's history. Minoru Suzuki is the oldest champion when he won it at 52 years old, while Will Ospreay is the youngest at 25 years old.

Aaron Wolf is the current champion in his second reign. He won the title by defeating Ren Narita at Dominion 6.14 in Osaka-jo Hall in Osaka, Japan, on June 14, 2026.

== See also ==
- IWGP U-30 Openweight Championship
