= Francesco Akira =

Italian professional wrestler (born 1999)

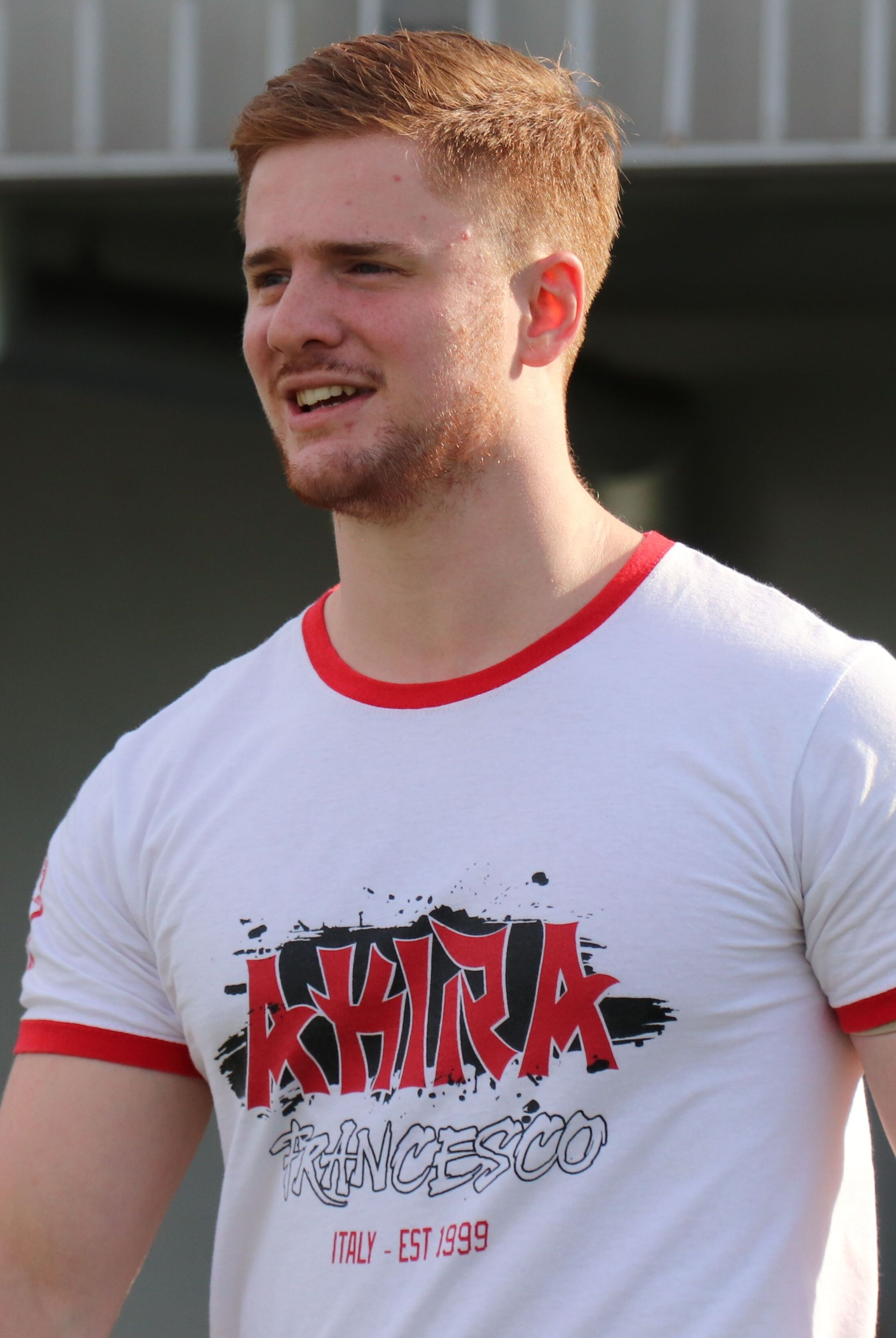
- Akira in August 2021

Personal information
- Born: November 12, 1999 (age 26) Bergamo, Italy

Professional wrestling career
- Ring name(s): Akira; Akira Francesco; Francesco Akira; Francisco Junko
- Billed height: 175 cm (5 ft 9 in)
- Billed weight: 70 kg (154 lb)
- Trained by: Alberto Copler; ICW Academy Bergamo; Kobra; Tajiri; TJ Perkins; Yuma Aoyagi; Will Ospreay
- Debut: August 29, 2015

Francesco Akira Begnini (born November 12, 1999) is an Italian professional wrestler. He is signed to New Japan Pro-Wrestling (NJPW), where he performs under his real name, stylized as Francesco Akira (Note: When wrestling in Japan, his ring name is written in katakana as フランシスコ・アキラ (Furanshisuko Akira).) and is a member of the United Empire stable. He is a former three-time IWGP Junior Heavyweight Tag Team Champion. He also makes appearances for partner promotion All Elite Wrestling (AEW).

Akira has also wrestled for All Japan Pro-Wrestling (AJPW), where he performed under the ring name Akira Francesco (アキラ・フランチェスコ, Akira Furanshisuko) (Note: His name as rendered in Japanese language name order, with the surname placed first.) and was a former AJPW Junior Heavyweight Champion.

== Professional wrestling career ==
=== Early career (2015–2018) ===
Begnini debuted as a professional wrestler in the Italian wrestling circuit, working for the Italian Championship Wrestling under the name Akira, the professional wrestling promotion where he trained, for the Rising Sun Wrestling Promotion, ASCA Wrestling, and also for Irish and British promotions such as Over the Top Wrestling and Attack! Pro Wrestling.

=== All Japan Pro Wrestling (2019–2021) ===
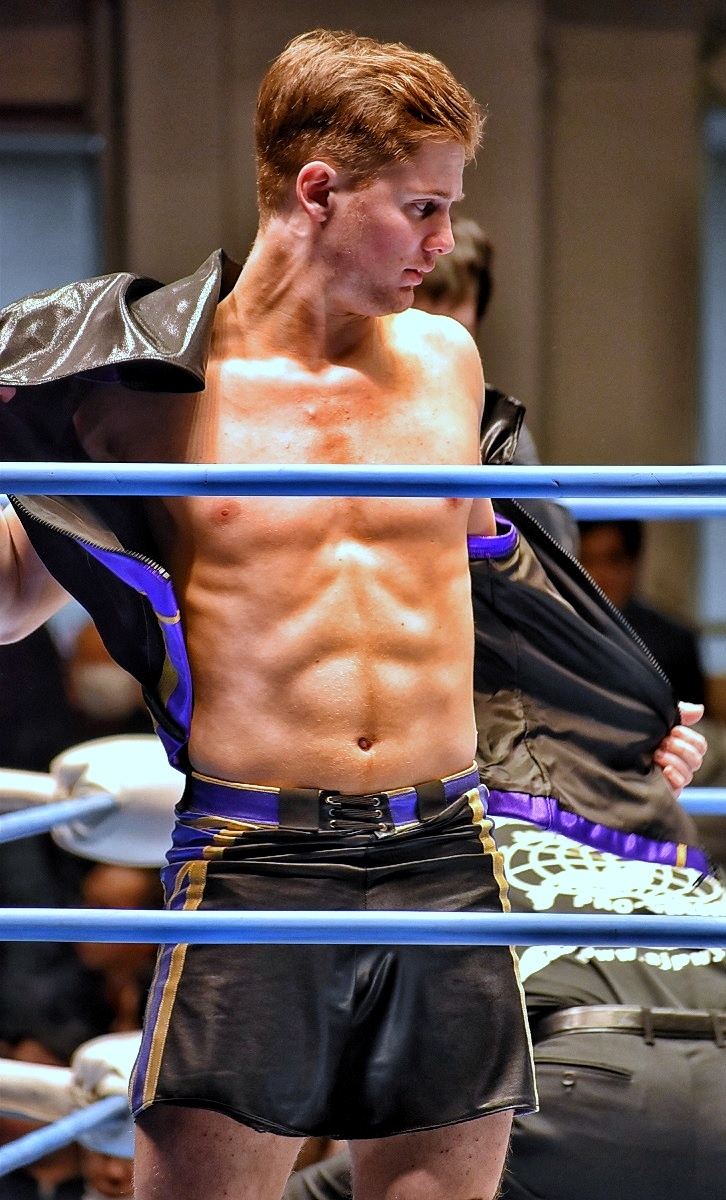
Akira Francesco in February 2020

Akira made his debut for All Japan Pro Wrestling (AJPW) on February 7, 2019, competing under the ring name Akira Francesco to team up with Black Menso-re, Kento Miyahara and Yoshitatsu in a losing effort to Evolution (Hikaru Sato, Suwama and Yusuke Okada). On February 11, 2020, Akira unsuccessfully challenged Susumu Yokosuka for the World Junior Heavyweight Championship.

In June 2021, he won the Jr. Battle of Glory, defeating Tajiri, Tatsuhito Takaiwa, Takuya Sugi, and El Lindaman to win the tournament and earned a championship opportunity. On June 26, Akira defeated Koji Iwamoto to win the World Junior Heavyweight Championship, becoming the first Italian and European wrestler to hold the title. He lost the championship to Takuya Sugi on July 22 in his first title defense, ending his reign at 26 days. Akira wrestled his final match for AJPW on September 16, 2021, teaming with Atsuki Aoyagi and Rising HAYATO to defeat Black Menso-re, Dan Tamura and Tajiri

=== New Japan Pro-Wrestling (2022–present) ===
==== Catch 2/2 (2022–2024) ====
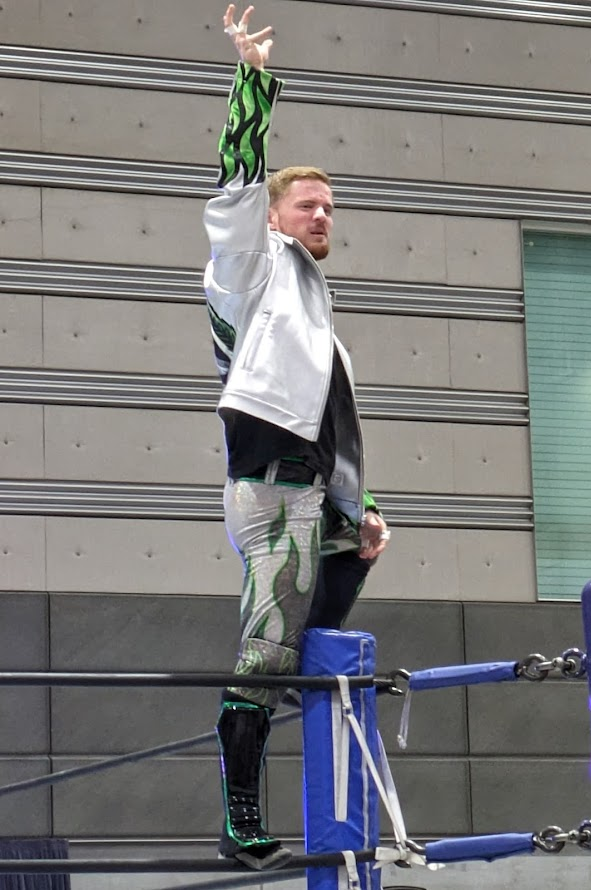
Akira in March 2024

On April 9, 2022, Akira made his debut for New Japan Pro-Wrestling (NJPW) at Hyper Battle '22, joining United Empire and announcing his entry into the Best of the Super Juniors tournament. On June 20, Akira and TJP defeated Master Wato and Ryusuke Taguchi to win the IWGP Junior Heavyweight Tag Team Championship, making Akira the first Italian wrestler to win a championship in NJPW.

As the tag team Catch 2/2, Akira and TJP lost the championships to Kushida and Kevin Knight in April 2023, before regaining them at Dominion 6.4 in Osaka-jo Hall in June. They lost the titles to the Bullet Club War Dogs' Clark Connors and Drilla Moloney the following month. In November, Catch 2/2 won the 2023 Super Junior Tag League, defeating Sho and Yoshinobu Kanemaru of House of Torture in the final to earn another championship opportunity.

At Wrestle Kingdom 18 on January 4, 2024, Catch 2/2 defeated Connors and Moloney to win the titles for a third time. They lost the championships back to the duo the following month. Akira was forced to withdraw from the 2024 Best of the Super Juniors tournament due to a left knee injury sustained during his May 19 match against Moloney.

==== Singles competition (2025–present) ====
Akira in August 2026

On March 6, 2025, he unsuccessfully challenged El Desperado for the IWGP Junior Heavyweight Championship at NJPW's 53rd Anniversary Show. Later that year, Catch 2/2 disbanded after TJP left NJPW. On August 22, Akira fractured his right wrist during a match against Leon Slater at Revolution Pro Wrestling's anniversary event, requiring surgery and sidelining him from competition.

On January 5, 2026 at Wrestle Kingdom 20, Akira returned as a heel and attacked Hiromu Takahashi. On February 11 at The New Beginning in Osaka, Akira teamed with stablemate Jakob Austin Young in a losing effort against Takahashi and Taiji Ishimori. From May to June, Akira participated in Best of the Super Juniors 33 (A block), ending with 12 points (6–3) and finished third in the block, losing the tiebreaker to Kosei Fujita and Master Wato, and failing to qualify for the semifinals as a result. During the Super Jr. Tag League, Akira would begin teasing a face turn after disagreeing with the tactics of partner Jakob Austin Young and the leadership of Callum Newman. On November 3 at Power Struggle, Akira was attacked by Newman after attemping to breakup a brawl between the latter and Will Ospreay, cementing his face turn and siding with Ospreay.

=== All Elite Wrestling (2026–present) ===
Due to NJPW's working relationshiip with All Elite Wrestling (AEW), Akira has made appearances for the promotion since 2026, teaming with his United Empire stablemates against rival stables such as the Death Riders, Don Callis Family, The Dogs, and The Demand as well as accompanying Will Ospreay to the ring for his AEW World Championship match against Kenny Omega at All In on August 30, 2026.

== Personal life ==
As well as his native Italian, Begnini also speaks English and has been learning Japanese since he began performing in the country in 2019.

== Championships and accomplishments ==
- Bodyslam! Pro Wrestling
  - Scandi Graps Invitational (2022)
- Adriatic Special Combat Academy
  - ASCA Tag Team Championship (1 time) – with Gravity
- European Pro Wrestling
  - EPW Heavyweight Championship (1 time)
- All Japan Pro Wrestling
  - World Junior Heavyweight Championship (1 time)
  - Jr. Battle of Glory (2021)
- Italian Championship Wrestling
  - ICW Italian Tag Team Championship (1 time) – with Gravity
  - ICW Cartoomics 24/7 Championship (1 time)
  - IL Numero Uno Tournament (2018)
- New Japan Pro-Wrestling
  - IWGP Junior Heavyweight Tag Team Championship (3 times) – with TJP
  - Super Jr. Tag League (2023) – with TJP
- Pro Wrestling Illustrated
  - Ranked No. 306 of the top 500 singles wrestlers in the PWI 500 in 2021
  - Ranked No. 264 of the top 500 singles wrestlers in the PWI 500 in 2022
  - Ranked No. 328 of the top 500 singles wrestlers in the PWI 500 in 2023
  - Ranked No. 326 of the top 500 singles wrestlers in the PWI 500 in 2024
  - Ranked No. 200 of the top 500 singles wrestlers in the PWI 500 in 2025
- Rising Sun Wrestling Promotion
  - Rising Championship (2 times)
- Superior Italian Wrestling
  - SIW Italian Championship (1 time)
