= List of IWGP Junior Heavyweight Tag Team Champions =

The IWGP Junior Heavyweight Tag Team Championship is a professional wrestling tag team championship owned by the New Japan Pro-Wrestling (NJPW) promotion. "IWGP" is the acronym of NJPW's governing body, the International Wrestling Grand Prix. The title was introduced on August 8, 1998, at a NJPW live event. The IWGP Junior Heavyweight Tag Team Championship is not the only tag team title contested for in NJPW; the IWGP Tag Team Championship is also sanctioned by NJPW. According to NJPW's official website, the Junior Heavyweight Tag Team Championship is listed as the "IWGP Jr. Tag Class", while the IWGP Tag Team Championship is considered the "IWGP Heavy Weight Class". The title is contested for by junior heavyweight wrestlers; the weight-limit for the title is 100 kg (220 lb) per partner. Being a professional wrestling championship, the title is won as a result of a predetermined outcome.

Title changes happen mostly at NJPW-promoted events. The inaugural champions were Shinjiro Otani and Tatsuhito Takaiwa, who defeated Dr. Wagner Jr. and Koji Kanemoto on August 8, 1998, in the final of a tournament. Rocky Romero holds the record for most reigns by an individual wrestler, with eight. At seven reigns, The Young Bucks (Matt Jackson and Nick Jackson) hold the record for the most by a team. Gedo and Jado's combined four reign lengths add up to 960 days—the most of any team. NJPW keep track of all championship title defenses per reign, which is unlike most mainstream wrestling organizations. They also hold the most total defenses as champions, with 15. Ryusuke Taguchi holds the records for most combined days and most total defenses by an individual wrestler, with 990 days and 17 defenses respectively across his 7 reigns with 4 different partners. Apollo 55 (Prince Devitt and Ryusuke Taguchi) hold the record for most defenses during a single reign, with 7. The Great Sasuke and Jushin Thunder Liger's only reign, Minoru and Prince Devitt's first reign, El Samurai and Koji Kanemoto's only reign, Apollo 55's fourth reign, Jushin Thunder Liger's sixth and Tiger Mask's first reign, The Young Bucks' second, fourth, and seventh reigns, Roppongi Vice's (Beretta and Rocky Romero) first, second and fourth reigns, Matt Sydal and Ricochet's first and second reigns and Roppongi 3K's (Sho and Yoh) second reign share the record for the fewest successful defenses, with zero. At 348 days, Otani and Takaiwa's second reign is the longest in the title's history. Minoru and Prince Devitt's first reign is the shortest, at 21 days.

The title is currently vacant after champions Las Máscaras de Oro (El Desperado and Místico) relinquished the title due to Desperado being diagnosed with spinal canal stenosis and a hernia injury. They originally won the title by defeating Ichiban Sweet Boys (Robbie Eagles and Kosei Fujita) on Night 2 of Wrestling Dontaku in Fukuoka, Japan, on May 4, 2026.

== Title history ==
Key
No.	Overall reign number
Reign	Reign number for the specific team—reign numbers for the individuals are in parentheses, if different
Days	Number of days held
Defenses	Number of successful defenses
+	Current reign is changing daily

No.	Champion	Championship change			Reign statistics			Notes	Ref.
No.	Champion	Date	Event	Location	Reign	Days	Defenses	Notes	Ref.
New Japan Pro Wrestling (NJPW)
1	Shinjiro Otani and Tatsuhito Takaiwa	August 8, 1998	Rising the Next Generations in Osaka Dome	Osaka, Japan	1	149	2	Defeated Dr. Wagner Jr. and Koji Kanemoto in a tournament final to become the first champions.	
2	Dr. Wagner Jr. and Kendo Kashin	January 4, 1999	Wrestling World	Tokyo, Japan	1	96	2		
3	The Great Sasuke and Jushin Thunder Liger	April 10, 1999	Strong Style Symphony	Tokyo, Japan	1	94	0		
4	Shinjiro Otani and Tatsuhito Takaiwa	July 13, 1999	Summer Struggle 1999	Morioka, Japan	2	348	4		
5	Koji Kanemoto and Minoru Tanaka	June 25, 2000	Summer Struggle 2000	Tokyo, Japan	1	254	3		
6	El Samurai and Jushin Thunder Liger	March 6, 2001	Hyper Battle 2001	Tokyo, Japan	1 (1, 2)	136	1		
7	Gedo and Jado	July 20, 2001	Dome Quake	Sapporo, Japan	1	286	6		
8	Jushin Thunder Liger and Minoru Tanaka	May 2, 2002	Toukon Memorial Day	Tokyo, Japan	1 (3, 2)	119	1		
9	Tsuyoshi Kikuchi and Yoshinobu Kanemaru	August 29, 2002	Cross Road	Tokyo, Japan	1	150	4		
10	Jushin Thunder Liger and Koji Kanemoto	January 26, 2003	The First Navigation 2003	Kobe, Japan	1 (4, 2)	282	6		
—	Vacated	November 4, 2003	—	—	—	—	—	The championship was vacated due to Kanemoto fracturing his left cheekbone.	
11	Gedo and Jado	November 29, 2003	Battle Final 2003	Miyagi, Japan	2	104	2	Defeated Hirooki Goto and Ryusuke Taguchi to win the vacant championship.	
12	American Dragon and Curry Man	March 12, 2004	Hyper Battle 2004	Tokyo, Japan	1	85	1		
13	Gedo and Jado	June 5, 2004	Best of the Super Jr. XI	Osaka, Japan	3	272	5		
14	Koji Kanemoto and Wataru Inoue	March 4, 2005	Big Fight Series 2005	Tokyo, Japan	1 (3, 1)	71	2		
15	Hirooki Goto and Minoru	May 14, 2005	Nexess VI	Tokyo, Japan	1 (1, 3)	281	2		
16	El Samurai and Ryusuke Taguchi	February 19, 2006	Circuit2006 Acceleration	Tokyo, Japan	1 (2, 1)	139	2		
17	Gedo and Jado	July 8, 2006	Circuit2006 Turbulence	Shizuoka, Japan	4	298	2		
18	Dick Togo and Taka Michinoku	May 2, 2007	New Japan Pro-Wrestling 35th Anniversary Tour Brave New World: Hall2Days	Tokyo, Japan	1	270	3		
19	Prince Prince (Minoru and Prince Devitt)	January 27, 2008	Circuit2008 New Japan Ism	Tokyo, Japan	1 (4, 1)	21	0		
20	Legend (Akira and Jushin Thunder Liger)	February 17, 2008	Circuit2008 New Japan Ism	Tokyo, Japan	1 (1, 5)	155	1		
21	Prince Prince (Minoru and Prince Devitt)	July 21, 2008	Circuit2008 New Japan Soul: Novello Sparks	Sapporo, Japan	2 (5, 2)	84	1		
22	No Limit (Tetsuya Naito and Yujiro)	October 13, 2008	Destruction '08	Tokyo, Japan	1	83	1		
23	The Motor City Machine Guns (Alex Shelley and Chris Sabin)	January 4, 2009	Wrestle Kingdom III in Tokyo Dome	Tokyo, Japan	1	182	3	The Motor City Machine Guns defended the championship twice in the Total Nonstop Action Wrestling (TNA) promotion during their reign, as part of an agreement between TNA and NJPW.	
24	Apollo 55 (Prince Devitt and Ryusuke Taguchi)	July 5, 2009	Circuit2009 New Japan Soul	Tokyo, Japan	1 (3, 2)	290	5		
—	Vacated	April 21, 2010	—	—	—	—	—	Title held up after the championship was not defended for 30 days.	
25	El Samurai and Koji Kanemoto	May 8, 2010	Super J Tag Tournament 1st	Tokyo, Japan	1 (3, 4)	72	0	Defeated Apollo 55 (Prince Devitt and Ryusuke Taguchi) in the final of an eight-team tournament to win the vacant title.	
26	Apollo 55 (Prince Devitt and Ryusuke Taguchi)	July 19, 2010	Circuit2010 New Japan Soul	Sapporo, Japan	2 (4, 3)	84	1		
27	Golden☆Lovers (Kenny Omega and Kota Ibushi)	October 11, 2010	Destruction '10	Tokyo, Japan	1	104	2		
28	Apollo 55 (Prince Devitt and Ryusuke Taguchi)	January 23, 2011	Fantastica Mania 2011	Tokyo, Japan	3 (5, 4)	260	7		
29	No Remorse Corps (Davey Richards and Rocky Romero)	October 10, 2011	Destruction '11	Tokyo, Japan	1	86	1		
30	Apollo 55 (Prince Devitt and Ryusuke Taguchi)	January 4, 2012	Wrestle Kingdom VI in Tokyo Dome	Tokyo, Japan	4 (6, 5)	39	0		
31	No Remorse Corps (Davey Richards and Rocky Romero)	February 12, 2012	The New Beginning	Osaka, Japan	2	80	0		
—	Vacated	May 2, 2012	—	—	—	—	—	Title held up after Davey Richards was unable to attend Wrestling Dontaku 2012 due to travel issues.	
32	Jushin Thunder Liger and Tiger Mask	June 16, 2012	Dominion 6.16	Osaka, Japan	1 (6, 1)	36	0	Defeated Suzuki-gun (Taichi and Taka Michinoku) to win the vacant title.	
33	Forever Hooligans (Alex Koslov and Rocky Romero)	July 22, 2012	Kizuna Road	Yamagata, Japan	1 (1, 3)	112	2		
34	Time Splitters (Alex Shelley and Kushida)	November 11, 2012	Power Struggle	Osaka, Japan	1 (2, 1)	173	3		
35	Forever Hooligans (Alex Koslov and Rocky Romero)	May 3, 2013	Wrestling Dontaku 2013	Fukuoka, Japan	2 (2, 4)	164	3		
36	Suzuki-gun (Taichi and Taka Michinoku)	October 14, 2013	King of Pro-Wrestling	Tokyo, Japan	1 (1, 2)	26	1		
37	The Young Bucks (Matt Jackson and Nick Jackson)	November 9, 2013	Power Struggle	Osaka, Japan	1	224	5		
38	Time Splitters (Alex Shelley and Kushida)	June 21, 2014	Dominion 6.21	Osaka, Japan	2 (3, 2)	140	3		
39	reDRagon (Bobby Fish and Kyle O'Reilly)	November 8, 2014	Power Struggle	Osaka, Japan	1	95	1		
40	The Young Bucks (Matt Jackson and Nick Jackson)	February 11, 2015	The New Beginning in Osaka	Osaka, Japan	2	53	0	This was a three-way match, also involving Time Splitters (Alex Shelley and Kushida).	
41	Roppongi Vice (Beretta and Rocky Romero)	April 5, 2015	Invasion Attack 2015	Tokyo, Japan	1 (1, 5)	28	0		
42	The Young Bucks (Matt Jackson and Nick Jackson)	May 3, 2015	Wrestling Dontaku 2015	Fukuoka, Japan	3	105	1	This was a three-way match, also involving reDRagon (Bobby Fish and Kyle O'Reilly).	
43	reDRagon (Bobby Fish and Kyle O'Reilly)	August 16, 2015	G1 Climax 25	Tokyo, Japan	2	141	2		
44	The Young Bucks (Matt Jackson and Nick Jackson)	January 4, 2016	Wrestle Kingdom 10 in Tokyo Dome	Tokyo, Japan	4	38	0	This was a four-way match, also involving Matt Sydal and Ricochet and Roppongi Vice (Beretta and Rocky Romero).	
45	Matt Sydal and Ricochet	February 11, 2016	The New Beginning in Osaka	Osaka, Japan	1	59	0	This was a three-way match, also involving reDRagon.	
46	Roppongi Vice (Beretta and Rocky Romero)	April 10, 2016	Invasion Attack 2016	Tokyo, Japan	2 (2, 6)	23	0		
47	Matt Sydal and Ricochet	May 3, 2016	Wrestling Dontaku 2016	Fukuoka, Japan	2	47	0		
48	The Young Bucks (Matt Jackson and Nick Jackson)	June 19, 2016	Dominion 6.19 in Osaka-jo Hall	Osaka, Japan	5	199	2	This was a four-way elimination match, also involving reDRagon (Bobby Fish and Kyle O'Reilly) and Roppongi Vice (Beretta and Rocky Romero).	
49	Roppongi Vice (Beretta and Rocky Romero)	January 4, 2017	Wrestle Kingdom 11 in Tokyo Dome	Tokyo, Japan	3 (3, 7)	61	1		
50	Suzuki-gun (Taichi and Yoshinobu Kanemaru)	March 6, 2017	Hataage Kinenbi	Tokyo, Japan	1 (2, 2)	52	1		
51	Roppongi Vice (Beretta and Rocky Romero)	April 27, 2017	Road to Wrestling Dontaku 2017: Aki no Kuni Sengoku Emaki	Hiroshima, Japan	4 (4, 8)	45	0		
52	The Young Bucks (Matt Jackson and Nick Jackson)	June 11, 2017	Dominion 6.11 in Osaka-jo Hall	Osaka, Japan	6	63	1		
53	Funky Future (Ricochet and Ryusuke Taguchi)	August 13, 2017	G1 Climax 27	Tokyo, Japan	1 (3, 6)	57	1		
54	Roppongi 3K (Sho and Yoh)	October 9, 2017	King of Pro-Wrestling	Tokyo, Japan	1	87	0		
55	The Young Bucks (Matt Jackson and Nick Jackson)	January 4, 2018	Wrestle Kingdom 12 in Tokyo Dome	Tokyo, Japan	7	24	0		
56	Roppongi 3K (Sho and Yoh)	January 28, 2018	The New Beginning in Sapporo	Sapporo, Japan	2	37	0		
57	Suzuki-gun (El Desperado and Yoshinobu Kanemaru)	March 6, 2018	Anniversary Show	Tokyo, Japan	1 (1, 3)	304	4	This was a three-way match, also involving Los Ingobernables de Japón (Bushi and Hiromu Takahashi).	
58	Los Ingobernables de Japón (Bushi and Shingo Takagi)	January 4, 2019	Wrestle Kingdom 13 in Tokyo Dome	Tokyo, Japan	1	61	1	This was a three-way match, also involving Roppongi 3K (Sho and Yoh).	
59	Roppongi 3K (Sho and Yoh)	March 6, 2019	Anniversary Show	Tokyo, Japan	3	102	1		
60	Bullet Club (El Phantasmo and Taiji Ishimori)	June 16, 2019	Kizuna Road	Tokyo, Japan	1	203	1		
61	Roppongi 3K (Sho and Yoh)	January 5, 2020	Wrestle Kingdom 14 in Tokyo Dome; Night 2	Tokyo, Japan	4	239	2		
—	Vacated	August 31, 2020	—	—	—	—	—	Title vacated due to Yoh suffering a torn ACL.	
62	Suzuki-gun (El Desperado and Yoshinobu Kanemaru)	September 11, 2020	New Japan Road	Tokyo, Japan	2 (2, 4)	134	2	Defeated Los Ingobernables de Japón (Bushi and Hiromu Takahashi) in a tournament final to win the vacant championship.	
63	Bullet Club (El Phantasmo and Taiji Ishimori)	January 23, 2021	Road to The New Beginning	Tokyo, Japan	2	33	0		
64	Suzuki-gun (El Desperado and Yoshinobu Kanemaru)	February 25, 2021	Road to Castle Attack	Tokyo, Japan	3 (3, 5)	38	0		
65	Roppongi 3K (Sho and Yoh)	April 4, 2021	Sakura Genesis	Tokyo, Japan	5	80	1		
66	Bullet Club's Cutest Tag Team (El Phantasmo and Taiji Ishimori)	June 23, 2021	Kizuna Road	Tokyo, Japan	3	74	1		
67	Suzuki-gun (El Desperado and Yoshinobu Kanemaru)	September 5, 2021	Wrestle Grand Slam in MetLife Dome	Tokorozawa, Japan	4 (4, 6)	51	0		
68	Flying Tiger (Robbie Eagles and Tiger Mask)	October 26, 2021	Road To Power Struggle	Tokyo, Japan	1 (1, 2)	116	1		
69	Six or Nine (Ryusuke Taguchi and Master Wato)	February 19, 2022	New Years Golden Series	Sapporo, Japan	1 (7, 1)	121	2	This was a four-way tag team match, which also involved Bullet Club's Cutest Tag Team (El Phantasmo and Taiji Ishimori) and Suzuki-gun (El Desperado and Yoshinobu Kanemaru).	
70	Catch 2/2 (TJP and Francesco Akira)	June 20, 2022	New Japan Road 2022	Tokyo, Japan	1	311	4		
71	Intergalactic Jet Setters (Kushida and Kevin Knight)	April 27, 2023	Road To Wrestling Dontaku 2023	Hiroshima, Japan	1 (3, 1)	38	0		
72	Catch 2/2 (TJP and Francesco Akira)	June 4, 2023	Dominion 6.4 in Osaka-jo Hall	Osaka, Japan	2	30	0		
73	Bullet Club War Dogs (Drilla Moloney and Clark Connors)	July 4, 2023	Independence Day; Night 1	Tokyo, Japan	1	184	3		
74	Catch 2/2 (TJP and Francesco Akira)	January 4, 2024	Wrestle Kingdom 18	Tokyo, Japan	3	31	0		
75	Bullet Club War Dogs (Drilla Moloney and Clark Connors)	February 4, 2024	Road to the New Beginning 2024	Tokyo, Japan	2	253	3		
76	Intergalactic Jet Setters (Kushida and Kevin Knight)	October 14, 2024	King of Pro-Wrestling	Tokyo, Japan	2 (4, 2)	82	1		
77	Ichiban Sweet Boys (Robbie Eagles and Kosei Fujita)	January 4, 2025	Wrestle Kingdom 19	Tokyo, Japan	1 (2, 1)	115	2	This was a Four-way Tokyo Terror ladder match, also involving Catch 2/2 (TJP and Francesco Akira), and Bullet Club War Dogs (Clark Connors and Drilla Moloney).	
78	Master Wato and Yoh	April 29, 2025	Wrestling Hizen no Kuni	Saga, Japan	1 (2, 6)	47	0		
79	House of Torture (Douki and Sho)	June 15, 2025	Dominion 6.15 in Osaka-jo Hall	Osaka, Japan	1 (1, 6)	204	3		
80	Ichiban Sweet Boys (Robbie Eagles and Kosei Fujita)	January 5, 2026	New Year Dash	Tokyo, Japan	2 (3, 2)	60	1	This was a four-way tag team match also involving El Desperado and Kuukai, and Bullet Club (Taiji Ishimori and Robbie X).	
81	Unbound Co. (Taiji Ishimori and Robbie X)	March 6, 2026	NJPW 54th Anniversary Show	Tokyo, Japan	1 (4, 1)	50	1		
82	Ichiban Sweet Boys (Robbie Eagles and Kosei Fujita)	April 25, 2026	NJPW Wrestling Redzone In Hiroshima 2026	Hiroshima, Japan	3 (4, 3)	9	0		
83	El Desperado and Místico	May 4, 2026	Wrestling Dontaku; Night 2	Fukuoka, Japan	1 (5, 1)	183	1		
—	Vacated	November 3, 2026	Power Struggle	Hiroshima, Japan	—	—	—	El Desperado and Místico relinquished the title due to Desperado suffering spinal canal stenosis and a hernia.	

== Combined reigns ==
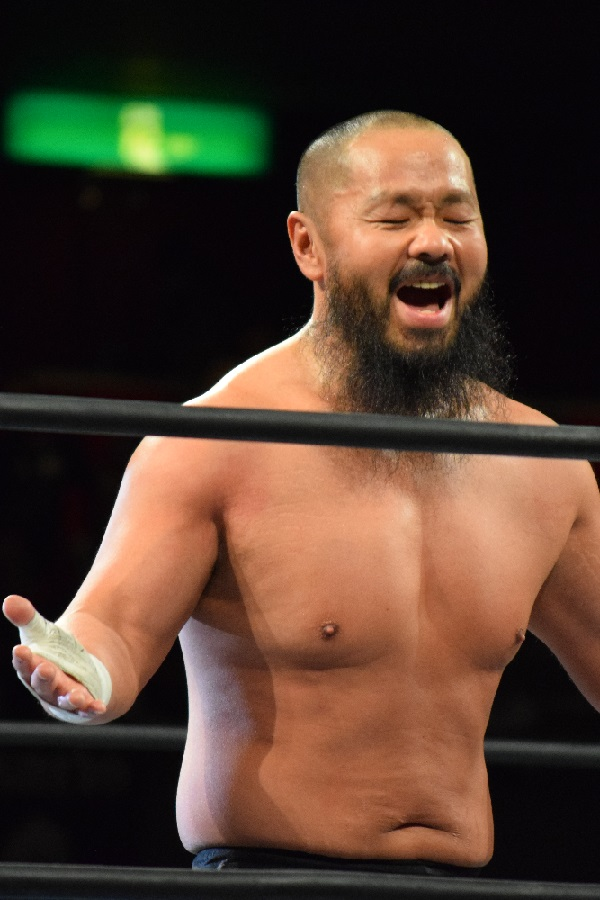
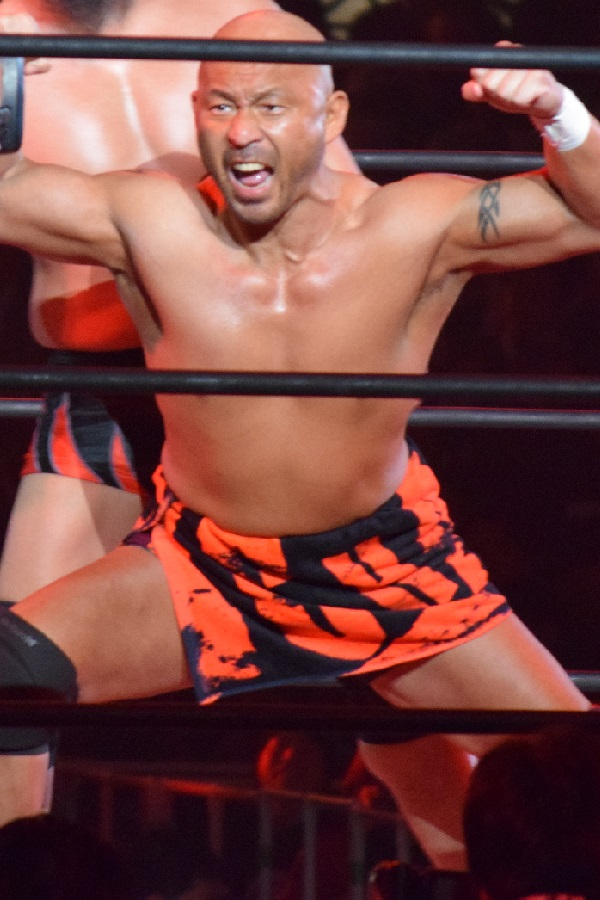
Four-time former champions Gedo (left) and Jado (right) hold the records for combined days as champions at 960 days, and combined defenses at 15.

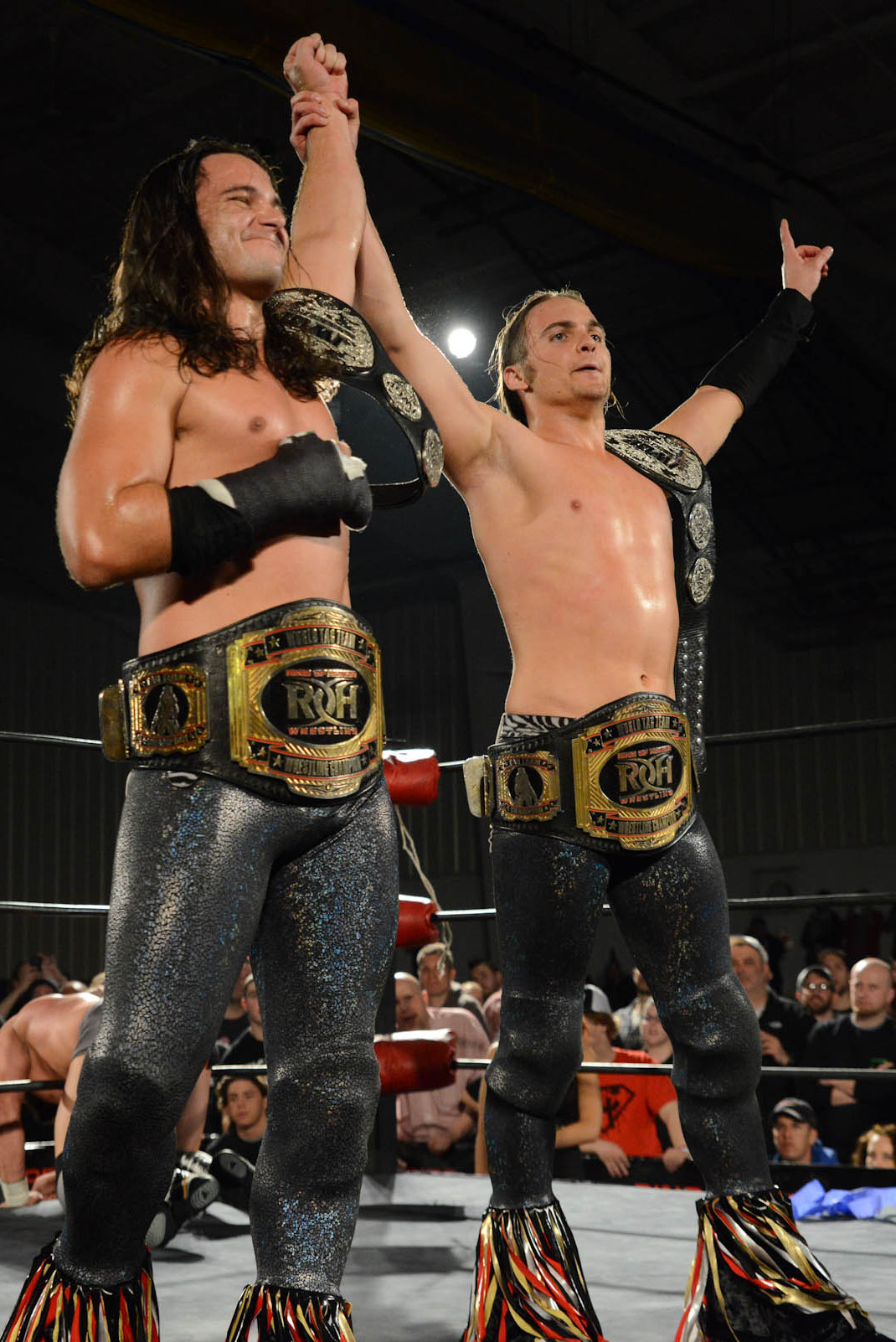
Record 7-time former champions The Young Bucks (Matt Jackson (right) and Nick Jackson (left))

As of November 5, 2026.

†	Indicates the current champions

=== By team ===
Rank	Team	No. of reigns	Combined defenses	Combined days
1	Gedo and Jado	4	15	960
2	The Young Bucks (Matt Jackson and Nick Jackson)	7	9	706
3	Apollo 55 (Prince Devitt and Ryusuke Taguchi)	4	13	673
4	Roppongi 3K (Sho and Yoh)	5	4	545
5	Suzuki-gun (El Desperado and Yoshinobu Kanemaru)	4	6	527
6	Shinjiro Otani and Tatsuhito Takaiwa	2	6	497
7	Bullet Club War Dogs (Clark Connors and Drilla Moloney)	2	6	437
8	Catch 2/2 (TJP and Francesco Akira)	3	4	372
9	Time Splitters (Alex Shelley and Kushida)	2	6	313
10	Bullet Club/Bullet Club's Cutest Tag Team (El Phantasmo and Taiji Ishimori)	3	2	310
11	Jushin Thunder Liger and Koji Kanemoto	1	6	282
12	Hirooki Goto and Minoru	1	2	281
13	Forever Hooligans (Alex Koslov and Rocky Romero)	2	5	276
14	Dick Togo and Taka Michinoku	1	3	270
15	Koji Kanemoto and Minoru Tanaka	1	3	254
16	reDRagon (Bobby Fish and Kyle O'Reilly)	2	3	236
17	House of Torture (Sho and Douki)	1	3	204
18	Ichiban Sweet Boys (Robbie Eagles and Kosei Fujita)	3	3	184
19	El Desperado and Místico	1	1	183
20	The Motor City Machine Guns (Alex Shelley and Chris Sabin)	1	3	182
21	No Remorse Corps (Davey Richards and Rocky Romero)	2	1	166
22	Roppongi Vice (Beretta and Rocky Romero)	1	4	157
23	Legend (Akira and Jushin Thunder Liger)	1	1	155
24	Tsuyoshi Kikuchi and Yoshinobu Kanemaru	1	4	150
25	El Samurai and Ryusuke Taguchi	1	2	139
26	El Samurai and Jushin Thunder Liger	1	1	136
27	Six Or Nine (Ryusuke Taguchi and Master Wato)	1	2	121
28	Intergalactic Jet Setters (Kushida and Kevin Knight)	2	1	120
29	Jushin Thunder Liger and Minoru Tanaka	1	1	119
30	Flying Tiger (Robbie Eagles and Tiger Mask)	1	1	116
31	Matt Sydal and Ricochet	2	0	106
32	Prince Prince (Minoru and Prince Devitt)	2	1	105
33	Golden☆Lovers (Kenny Omega and Kota Ibushi)	1	2	104
34	Dr. Wagner Jr. and Kendo Kashin	1	2	96
35	The Great Sasuke and Jushin Thunder Liger	1	0	94
36	American Dragon and Curry Man	1	1	85
37	No Limit (Tetsuya Naito and Yujiro)	1	1	83
38	El Samurai and Koji Kanemoto	1	0	72
39	Koji Kanemoto and Wataru Inoue	1	2	71
40	Los Ingobernables de Japón (Bushi and Shingo Takagi)	1	1	61
41	Funky Future (Ricochet and Ryusuke Taguchi)	1	1	57
42	Suzuki-gun (Taichi and Yoshinobu Kanemaru)	1	1	52
43	Unbound Co. (Taiji Ishimori and Robbie X)	1	1	50
44	Master Wato and Yoh	1	0	47
45	Jushin Thunder Liger and Tiger Mask	1	0	36
46	Suzuki-gun (Taichi and Taka Michinoku)	1	1	26

=== By wrestler ===
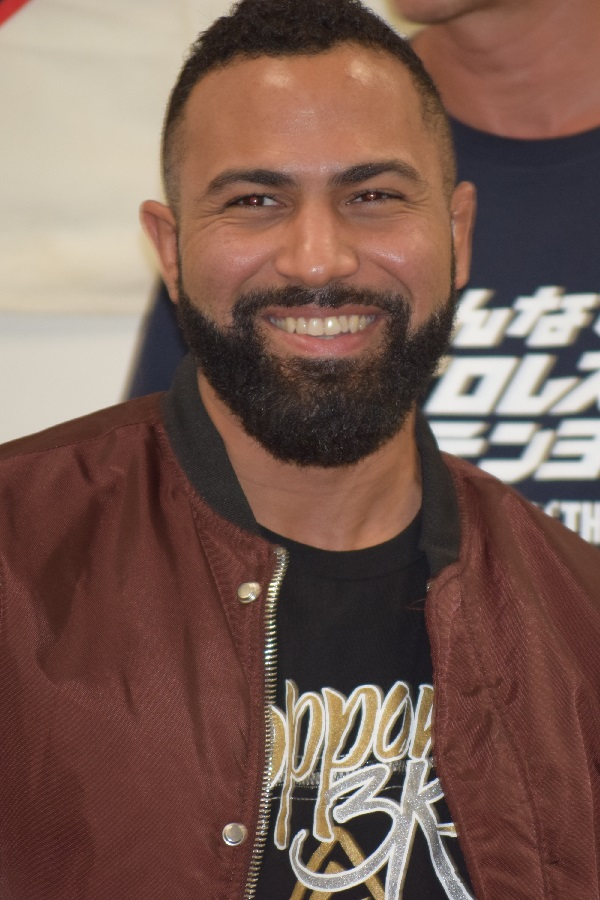
Record eight-time champion Rocky Romero

Rank	Wrestler	No. of reigns	Combined defenses	Combined days
1	Ryusuke Taguchi	7	17	990
2	Gedo	4	15	960
2	Jado	4	15	960
4	Jushin Thunder Liger	6	9	822
5	Prince Devitt	6	13	778
6	Minoru/Minoru Tanaka	5	7	759
7	Sho	6	7	749
8	Yoshinobu Kanemaru	6	11	728
9	El Desperado	5	7	710
10	Matt Jackson	7	9	706
10	Nick Jackson	7	9	706
12	Koji Kanemoto	4	11	679
13	Rocky Romero	8	7	599
14	Yoh	6	4	592
15	Shinjiro Otani	2	6	497
15	Tatsuhito Takaiwa	2	6	497
17	Alex Shelley	3	9	495
18	Clark Connors	2	6	437
18	Drilla Moloney	2	6	437
20	Kushida	4	7	431
21	Francesco Akira	3	4	372
21	TJP	3	4	372
23	Taiji Ishimori	3	5	360
24	El Samurai	3	3	347
25	El Phantasmo	3	2	310
26	Robbie Eagles	4	4	300
27	TAKA Michinoku	2	4	296
28	Hirooki Goto	1	2	281
29	Alex Koslov	2	5	276
30	Dick Togo	1	3	270
31	Bobby Fish	2	3	236
31	Kyle O'Reilly	2	3	236
33	Douki	1	3	204
34	Kosei Fujita	3	3	184
35	Místico	1	1	183
36	Chris Sabin	1	3	182
37	Master Wato	2	2	168
38	Davey Richards	2	1	166
39	Ricochet	3	1	163
40	Beretta	4	1	157
41	Akira	1	1	155
42	Tiger Mask	2	1	152
43	Tsuyoshi Kikuchi	1	4	150
44	Kevin Knight	2	1	120
45	Matt Sydal	2	0	106
46	Kenny Omega	1	2	104
46	Kota Ibushi	1	2	104
48	Dr. Wagner Jr.	1	2	96
48	Kendo Kashin	1	2	96
50	The Great Sasuke	1	0	94
51	American Dragon	1	1	85
51	Curry Man	1	1	85
53	Tetsuya Naito	1	1	83
53	Yujiro	1	1	83
55	Taichi	2	2	78
56	Wataru Inoue	1	2	71
57	Bushi	1	1	61
57	Shingo Takagi	1	1	61
59	Robbie X	1	1	50
