= Ryusuke Taguchi =

Japanese professional wrestler (born 1979)

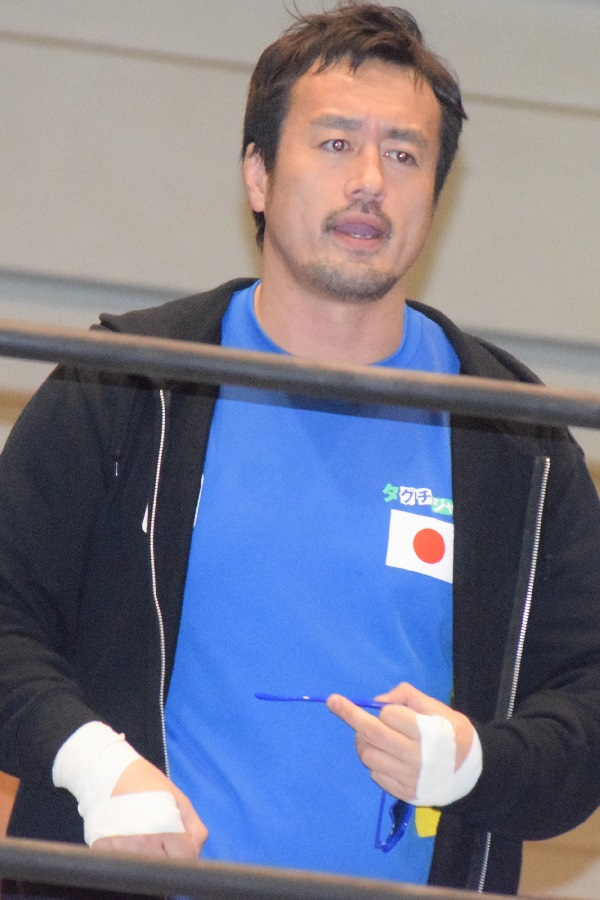
- Taguchi in March 2018

Personal information
- Born: April 15, 1979 (age 47) Iwanuma, Miyagi, Japan

Professional wrestling career
- Ring names: Masked Horse; Ryusuke Taguchi; Super Strong Machine No. 69; Taguchi; Pro-Wrestler Sengoku Enbu; Ginbae Mask
- Billed height: 1.80 m (5 ft 11 in)
- Billed weight: 91 kg (201 lb)
- Trained by: NJPW Dojo; Kotetsu Yamamoto
- Debut: November 22, 2002

Ryusuke Taguchi (田口 隆祐, Taguchi Ryūsuke; born April 15, 1979) is a Japanese professional wrestler. He is signed to New Japan Pro Wrestling (NJPW). He also makes appearances for DDT Pro Wrestling (DDT), where he is the current DDT Universal Champion in his first reign.

Pursuing several sports in high school, Taguchi competed in 76 kg (168 lb) class amateur wrestling in college before entering the NJPW Dojo in March 2002 and debuting in November of that year at Korakuen Hall in Tokyo, wrestling in New Japan's famous junior heavyweight division.

Taguchi's best known gimmick is akin to a disco dancer, often sporting a short afro and colorful, flamboyant attire and celebrating victories with a post-match dance, encouraging his partners to join in during tag team matches. This earned Taguchi the nickname "Funky Weapon".

== Professional wrestling career ==
=== New Japan Pro-Wrestling ===
==== Early career (2002–2006) ====
During high school, Taguchi dabbled in many athletic pursuits, including baseball, soccer, and track and field, before entering the 76 kg (168 lb) class in amateur wrestling at Tōkai University. He enrolled in the New Japan Pro-Wrestling (NJPW) dojo in March 2002, training under Kotetsu Yamamoto, passing the promotion's notoriously tough entry test, before debuting on November 22, 2002, in a losing effort against Toru Yano. Taguchi continued to wrestle in minor matches through early 2003, before being entered into the tenth annual Best of the Super Juniors (BOSJ) tournament by default after Heat pulled out. Taguchi finished in last place with zero points, losing all of his matches.

In November 2003, Ryusuke Taguchi and fellow New Japan graduate Hirooki Goto won a 4-team tournament to decide the number one contenders to the IWGP Junior Heavyweight Tag Team Championship, defeating Wataru Inoue and El Samurai in the semifinals and Masahito Kakihara and Masayuki Naruse in the finals. When the title was vacated just days later due to injury, Taguchi and Goto instead faced Gedo and Jado (who had won a separate tournament) on November 29, 2003, to decide the new champions; Gedo and Jado won the match and the title. On December 27, 2003, Taguchi defeated Naofumi Yamamoto to gain a spot on the card for New Japan's annual Tokyo Dome show, Wrestling World. He went on to defeat Akiya Anzawa at the event on January 4, 2004, in under five minutes.

On March 21, 2004, Taguchi and Goto received their second opportunity at the junior tag titles, falling to champions American Dragon and Curry Man. On the April Strong Energy tour, Taguchi was entered into the eight-man round-robin Young Lion Cup (YLC) tournament, earning nine points in the group stage and defeating Hirooki Goto and Michinoku Pro's Kazuya Yuasa in the semifinals and final, respectively. Winning the tournament earned Taguchi his first singles title opportunity, as he unsuccessfully challenged U-30 (under 30) Openweight Champion Hiroshi Tanahashi on May 13, 2004. Taguchi once again competed in the Best of the Super Juniors tournament in June 2004, finishing with 4 points by wrestling to 20-minute time limit draws with El Samurai and American Dragon, and defeating Jyushin Thunder Liger in 45 seconds. Taguchi again finished in last place for his block.

In October and November 2004, Taguchi competed in the 7-man, single-elimination Young Lion Toukon Tournament, a sort of "sequel" to the Young Lion Cup; he received a bye to the semifinals as a result of winning that tournament, defeating Hiroshi Nagao and Katsuhiko Nakajima in his two matches to punctuate his YLC victory.

On January 6, 2005, Taguchi announced that he would be going on a learning excursion to Mexican promotion Consejo Mundial de Lucha Libre (CMLL), a common practice for young Japanese juniors, wrestling simply as "Taguchi". He competed in two farewell matches in New Japan, losing to Wataru Inoue in the first and teaming with Taiji Ishimori to defeat Tiger Mask and El Samurai in the second. Taguchi made his CMLL debut on February 11, 2005, in the Arena México, teaming with Black Tiger and Shigeo Okumura to defeat Negro Casas, Felino and Safari. Taguchi also wrestled in Último Dragón's Toryumon Mexico, teaming with Hiromi Horiguchi to win the 4-team Yamaha Cup tournament on February 27, 2005. Taguchi continued to compete in CMLL throughout much of 2005, often teaming with fellow New Japan alumni Shinsuke Nakamura and Hiroshi Tanahashi. He returned to Japan on October 7, 2005 and wrestled his official return match on October 22, 2005, teaming with Masahito Kakihara to defeat Sangre Azteca and Hirooki Goto.

On February 19, 2006, Ryusuke Taguchi and veteran junior El Samurai defeated heel faction CTU's (Counter Terrorist Unit) Minoru and Hirooki Goto to win the IWGP Junior Heavyweight Tag Team Championship, giving Taguchi his first title. They made their first defense on March 19, 2006, defeating another veteran-young lion duo in Koji Kanemoto and Wataru Inoue, followed by three-time title holders Gedo and Jado on May 7, 2006, in a match that lasted over 30 minutes.

Taguchi again competed in the BOSJ in June 2006, finishing in fourth place out of seven in his block with seven points, defeating Jyushin Thunder Liger, Sangre Azteca and Fuego, and wrestling to a double count out with Jado. Taguchi and Samurai faced Gedo and Jado in a title rematch on July 8, 2006, losing the belts to their challengers in another 30-minute match. On September 3, 2006, Taguchi made his debut in New Japan's WRESTLE LAND brand, teaming with Pegasus Kid II to defeat Milano Collection A.T. and Makai Rey Cobra #3; he also wrestled in a brief "bonus track" match later in the night, winning a 14-man tag team match along with Hiroshi Tanahashi, Tanaka, Jado, Gedo, Pegasus Kid and Gran Naniwa against Toru Yano, Milano, and five members of the Makai Club. Taguchi continued to participate in WRESTLE LAND through 2006 and 2007. On September 24, 2006, Taguchi made his first attempt at a major singles junior title by challenging Tiger Mask for the NWA World Junior Heavyweight Championship, losing in 13 minutes.

==== IWGP Junior Heavyweight Champion (2007–2008) ====
At New Japan's annual Tokyo Dome event on January 4, 2007, Taguchi teamed with El Samurai and All Japan Pro Wrestling's Masanobu Fuchi to defeat Kikutaro, Nobutaka Araya and Akira Raijin, pinning Kikutaro after the Dodon. Four days later on January 7, 2007, Taguchi suffered a right eye injury in a tag team match with Tiger Mask against Jyushin Thunder Liger and Milano Collection A.T., forcing him out of action for two months. He had been scheduled to compete in a four-man tournament to decide the number one contender to the IWGP Junior Heavyweight Championship, but was removed as a result of the injury; Taguchi returned on March 3, 2007. On March 11, 2007, Taguchi was introduced as the first member of El Samurai's new Samurai Gym faction, and was later joined by Yujiro on March 18, 2007. On April 13, 2007, Taguchi challenged Minoru for the IWGP Junior Heavyweight Championship in his first shot at the title, albeit unsuccessfully. Minoru also stole the Samurai Gym signboard after the match, carrying it as a trophy for the next several months.

Taguchi entered the 14th annual Best of the Super Juniors tournament in June 2007, having his strongest showing to date, winning five out of six group stage matches by defeating Tetsuya Naito, Koji Kanemoto, El Samurai, Dragon Gate's BxB Hulk, and junior champion Minoru, finishing in first place for his block with 10 points. Taguchi lost in the semifinals however, to eventual winner Milano Collection A.T. As a reward of sorts for beating Minoru in the tournament, Taguchi was granted a second shot at the Junior Heavyweight title on July 6, 2007, defeating Minoru once more to win his first singles championship, and retrieving the Samurai Gym signboard. He made his first defense of the title on September 24, 2007, defeating Tiger Mask. He defended the championship once again on October 7, 2007, at independent promotion Pro Wrestling KAGEKI's tenth anniversary show, defeating the company's founder Azteca; the following day, Taguchi again defended the title, defeating Minoru once more. On October 28, 2007, Taguchi defended the title for the third time in one month, defeating 5-time champion Koji Kanemoto in Kobe, Kanemoto's hometown. Taguchi lost the title in his fifth defense on December 8, 2007, falling to Wataru Inoue.

On January 4, 2008, at Wrestle Kingdom II in Tokyo Dome, Taguchi teamed with Takashi Iizuka, Koji Kanemoto and Tiger Mask to face the "Alliance" of Pro Wrestling ZERO1-MAX's Masato Tanaka and Tatsuhito Takaiwa, and DRADITION's Katsushi Takemura and Yutaka Yoshie; the Alliance won the encounter, Yoshie pinning Taguchi. Taguchi faced Wataru Inoue in a rematch for the IWGP Junior Heavyweight Championship on January 27, 2008, losing to Inoue once more. On February 1, 2008, it was announced that El Samurai would be leaving NJPW due to his contract expiring, effectively ending Samurai Gym. In March and April 2008, Taguchi represented NJPW in several interpromotional matches with the newly renamed Pro Wrestling ZERO1; on March 30, 2008, at New Dimension, Taguchi and Koji Kanemoto defeated ZERO1's Masato Tanaka and Tatsuhito Takaiwa. On the following New Japan Brave tour, Taguchi defeated Takaiwa in a singles match. He then teamed with Kanemoto and Manabu Nakanishi in three tag team matches in late April, he and Nakanishi defeating ZERO1's Takao Omori and Osamu Namiguchi, he and Kanemoto again defeating Tanaka and Takaiwa, and he and Kanemoto losing to Tanaka and Shinjiro Otani.

On April 29, 2008, Taguchi faced his former partner and generation rival, Hirooki Goto, who had since graduated to the heavyweight division. The match, which took place in Goto's hometown of Kuwana, was won by Goto in just under 15 minutes. In June of that year, Taguchi once again entered the Best of the Super Juniors tournament, finishing in first place for his six-man block with eight points, losing only to Tatsuhito Takaiwa in a rematch of their April meeting, and defeating the man who won the Junior title from him, Wataru Inoue. Taguchi advanced to the semifinals as a result, losing to Koji Kanemoto.

==== Apollo 55 (2009–2013) ====
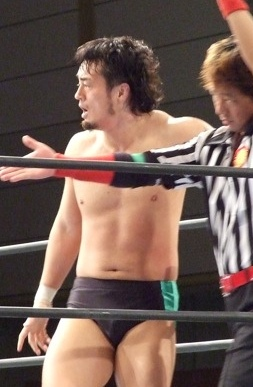
Taguchi in June 2011

On July 5, 2009, at Circuit 2009 New Japan Soul Taguchi and Prince Devitt, known collectively as Apollo 55, defeated The Motor City Machine Guns of Alex Shelley and Chris Sabin to win the IWGP Junior Heavyweight Tag Team Championship. On January 4, 2010, at Wrestle Kingdom IV in Tokyo Dome Taguchi and Devitt successfully defended the titles against Averno and Último Guerrero. On April 21 Taguchi and Devitt were stripped of the titles, after they had not defended them for 30 days. On May 8 the two entered the Super J Tag Tournament in an attempt to regain the Championship, but were defeated in the finals by the team of El Samurai and Koji Kanemoto. On June 28, 2010, Taguchi, teaming up with Devitt and Hirooki Goto entered the J Sports Crown Openweight 6 Man Tag Tournament. Two days later the trio defeated Hiroshi Tanahashi, Tajiri and Kushida in the finals to win the tournament. On July 19, Taguchi and Devitt defeated Koji Kanemoto and El Samurai to win the IWGP Junior Heavyweight Tag Team Championship for the second time as a team. On October 11 Taguchi and Devitt lost the IWGP Junior Heavyweight Tag Team Championship to the Golden☆Lovers (Kenny Omega and Kota Ibushi). On January 22, 2011, Taguchi defeated Máscara Dorada for the CMLL World Welterweight Championship at a Consejo Mundial de Lucha Libre and New Japan Pro-Wrestling co–promoted event, titled Fantastica Mania 2011, in Tokyo. At the second Fantastica Mania 2011 show the following day, Taguchi and Devitt regained the IWGP Junior Heavyweight Tag Team Championship from Kenny Omega and Kota Ibushi. On April 3, Taguchi made his first defense of the CMLL World Welterweight Championship, defeating Japanese independent performer Madoka. In May 2011, Taguchi took part in the Invasion Tour 2011, New Japan's first ever tour of the United States, during which he and Devitt successfully defended the IWGP Junior Heavyweight Tag Team Championship against the Strong Style Thugz (Homicide and Low Ki) on May 15 in Philadelphia, Pennsylvania. During the 2011 Best of the Super Juniors, Taguchi debuted a new finishing move, the Milano–saku Dodon's Throne, and used it to win five out of his eight-round robin stage matches to finish second in his block and advance to the semifinals of the tournament. On June 10, Taguchi defeated his own tag team partner and IWGP Junior Heavyweight Champion Prince Devitt to advance to the finals of the tournament, where he was defeated by Kota Ibushi. On June 18 at Dominion 6.18, Taguchi lost the CMLL World Welterweight Championship back to Máscara Dorada. On June 23, Taguchi, Devitt and Hirooki Goto won their second J Sports Crown Openweight 6 Man Tag Tournament in a row by defeating the team of Giant Bernard, Jyushin Thunder Liger and Karl Anderson in the finals of the three-day-long tournament. On August 1, Taguchi unsuccessfully challenged Kota Ibushi for the IWGP Junior Heavyweight Championship. On August 14, Taguchi and Devitt successfully defended the IWGP Junior Heavyweight Tag Team Championship against Ibushi and Kenny Omega. On September 11, Apollo 55 defeated Taichi and Taka Michinoku to make their seventh successful IWGP Junior Heavyweight Tag Team Championship defense, breaking the record for most defenses during a single reign. On October 10 at Destruction '11, Taguchi and Devitt lost the IWGP Junior Heavyweight Tag Team Championship to the No Remorse Corps (Davey Richards and Rocky Romero). On January 4, 2012, at Wrestle Kingdom VI in Tokyo Dome, Taguchi and Devitt defeated Richards and Romero to once again regain the IWGP Junior Heavyweight Tag Team Championship. On February 12 at The New Beginning, Apollo 55 lost the IWGP Junior Heavyweight Tag Team Championship back to the No Remorse Corps in their first defense.

On May 27, Taguchi entered the 2012 Best of the Super Juniors tournament. Winning five out of his eight round-robin stage matches, Taguchi finished second in his block and advanced to the semifinals of the tournament. The following day, Taguchi first defeated Pac in the semifinals and then avenged his earlier round-robin loss to IWGP Junior Heavyweight Champion Low Ki in the finals to win the 2012 Best of the Super Juniors and earn a shot at Low Ki's title. On June 16 at Dominion 6.16, Taguchi failed in his title shot against Low Ki. On September 23 at Destruction, Taguchi received another shot at the title, but was this time defeated by Kota Ibushi. On October 21, Apollo 55 entered the 2012 Super Jr. Tag Tournament, defeating Chaos World Wrestling Warriors (Brian Kendrick and Low Ki) in their first round match. On November 2, Taguchi and Devitt defeated the reigning IWGP Junior Heavyweight Tag Team Champions, the Forever Hooligans (Alex Koslov and Rocky Romero), to advance to the finals of the tournament, where, later that same day, they were defeated by the Time Splitters (Alex Shelley and Kushida). Despite failing to make it to the main card of Wrestle Kingdom 7 in Tokyo Dome, Taguchi made an appearance at the event, challenging Prince Devitt to a match for the IWGP Junior Heavyweight Championship, after he had successfully defended the title against Low Ki and Kota Ibushi. Taguchi received his title shot on February 10 at The New Beginning, but was defeated by Devitt. On April 7 at Invasion Attack, Apollo 55 unsuccessfully challenged Time Splitters for the IWGP Junior Heavyweight Tag Team Championship, after which Devitt turned on Taguchi, ending the longtime partnership between the two.

==== Singles competition (2013–2016) ====
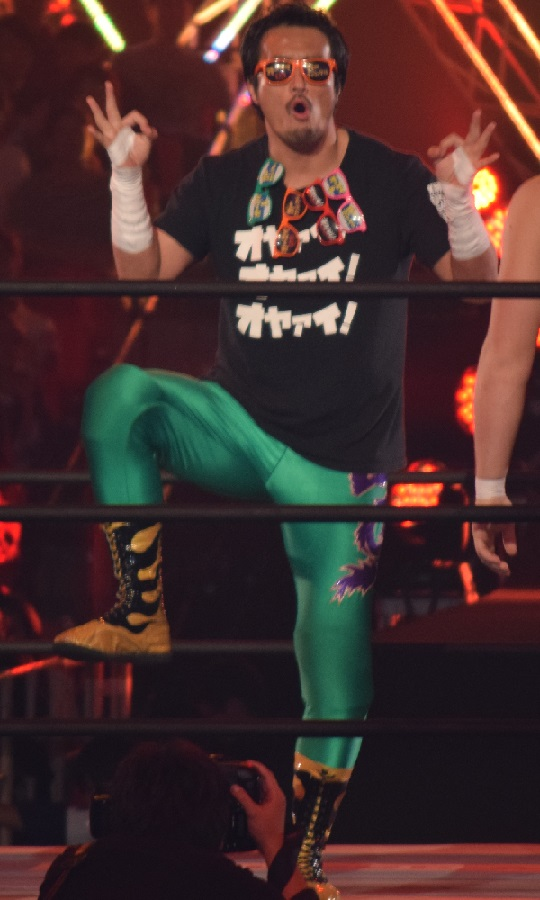
Taguchi in November 2015

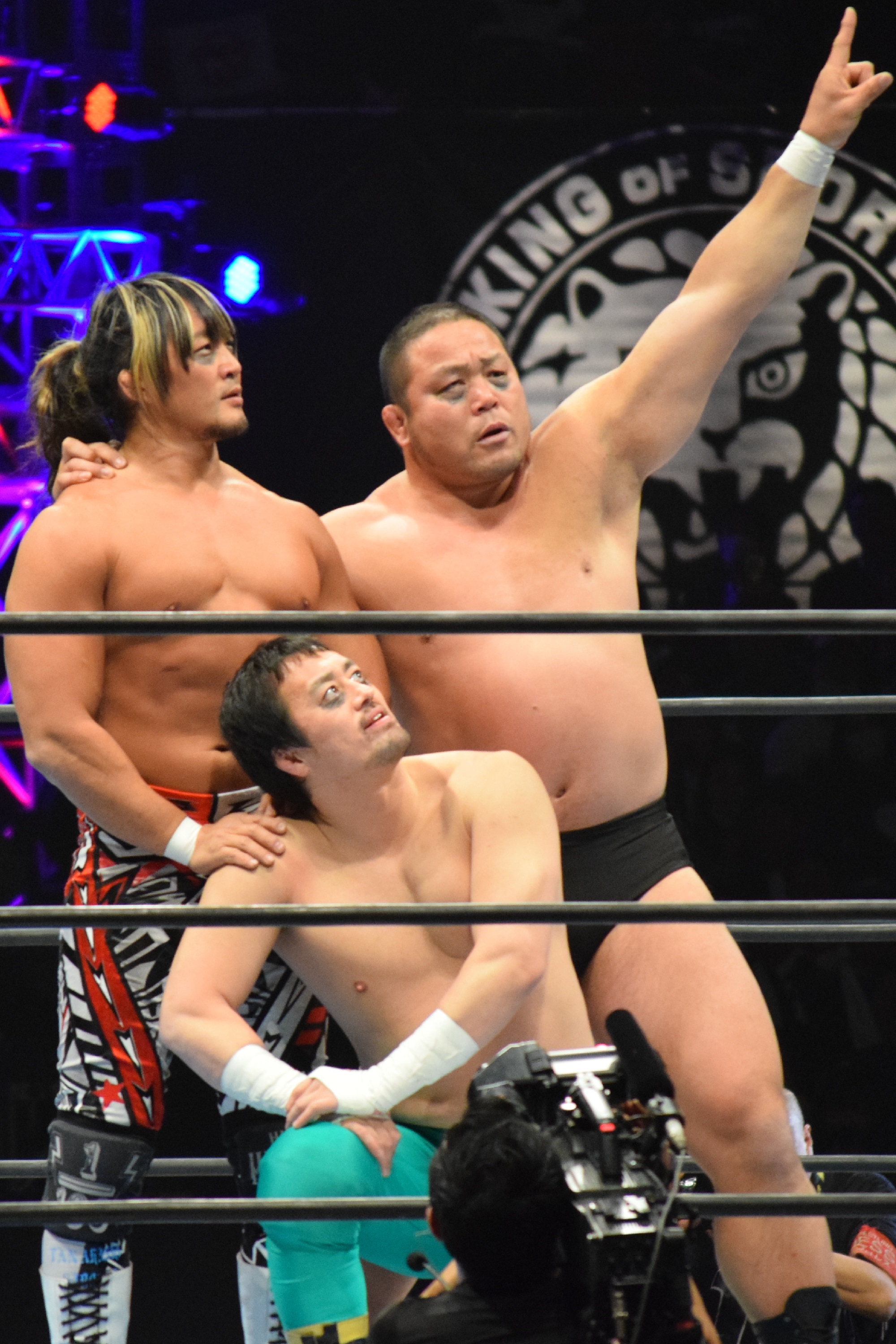
Taguchi Japan in February 2017

The first match between the former members of Apollo 55 took place on May 3 at Wrestling Dontaku 2013, where Taguchi and Captain New Japan were defeated in a tag team match by Devitt and his new associate Bad Luck Fale. In the 2013 Best of the Super Juniors, Taguchi won his block with five wins and three losses, advancing to the semifinals of the tournament. However, on June 9, New Japan announced that Taguchi had suffered a hip injury and could not participate in his semifinal match; he was replaced by Taka Michinoku. Taguchi made his return on January 5, 2014, announcing that he was returning to the ring during the February tour, looking to continue his feud with Devitt. Taguchi wrestled his return match on February 2, teaming with Alex Shelley, Kushida and Togi Makabe in an eight-man tag team match, where they were defeated by Devitt and his Bullet Club stablemates Bad Luck Fale, Matt Jackson and Nick Jackson, with Devitt pinning him for the win. On February 11 at The New Beginning in Osaka, Taguchi picked up his first win over Devitt by pinning him a tag team match, where he and Togi Makabe defeated Devitt and Bad Luck Fale. On April 6 at Invasion Attack 2014, one year after the break-up of Apollo 55, Taguchi defeated Devitt in a singles grudge match. Post-match the two men shook hands, ending their rivalry with each other.

At the following major event, Wrestling Dontaku 2014 on May 3, Taguchi received a shot at the IWGP Junior Heavyweight Championship, but was defeated by the defending champion, Kota Ibushi. On May 30, Taguchi entered the 2014 Best of the Super Juniors tournament, where he finished second in his block with a record of four wins and three losses, advancing to the semifinals. On June 8, Taguchi was eliminated from the tournament in the semifinals by Ricochet. On September 21 at Destruction in Kobe, Taguchi defeated Kushida to win the IWGP Junior Heavyweight Championship for the second time. He made his first successful title defense on October 13 at King of Pro-Wrestling against El Desperado, despite outside interference from his Suzuki-gun stablemates Taichi and Taka Michinoku. Taguchi's feud with the Suzuki-gun trio continued on October 25 at the 2014 Super Jr. Tag Tournament, where he teamed with Mexican wrestler Fuego. Taguchi and Fuego were eliminated from the tournament in the first round by El Desperado and Taichi, when Taichi pinned Taguchi, after outside interference from Michinoku and Desperado hitting him with his own title belt. This led to Power Struggle on November 8, where Taguchi successfully defended his title against Taichi. On January 4, 2015, Taguchi lost the title to Kenny Omega at Wrestle Kingdom 9 in Tokyo Dome.

Taguchi received a rematch for the title on February 11 at The New Beginning in Osaka, but was again defeated by Omega. In May, Taguchi entered the 2015 Best of the Super Juniors. After five wins and one loss, he entered the final day with a chance to reach the finals of the tournament, but a loss to Chase Owens meant that he was eliminated instead. A year later, Taguchi won his block in the 2016 Best of the Super Juniors with a record of five wins and two losses, advancing to the finals of the tournament. On June 7, Taguchi was defeated in the finals of the tournament by Will Ospreay. On July 20, Taguchi entered the 2016 Super J-Cup, defeating Pro Wrestling Noah representative Daisuke Harada in his first round match. On August 21, he was eliminated from the tournament in the second round by another Noah representative, Yoshinobu Kanemaru.

==== Taguchi Japan (2017–present) ====
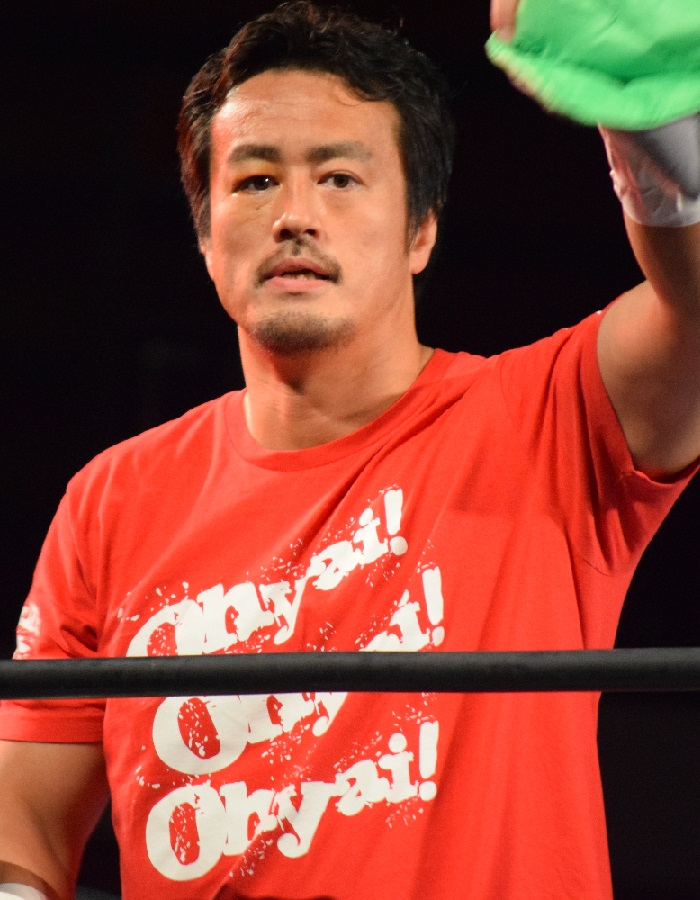
Taguchi in May 2016

On January 5, 2017, Taguchi, Hiroshi Tanahashi and Manabu Nakanishi defeated Los Ingobernables de Japón (Bushi, Evil and Sanada) for the NEVER Openweight 6-Man Tag Team Championship. The trio of Taguchi, Tanahashi and Nakanishi eventually became known as "Taguchi Japan". Taguchi was portrayed as the coach of the pseudo-baseball/soccer/professional wrestling stable. They lost the title back to L.I.J. on February 11 at The New Beginning in Osaka. On March 6 at NJPW's 45th anniversary event, Taguchi unsuccessfully challenged Hiromu Takahashi for the IWGP Junior Heavyweight Championship. Over the following months, Taguchi Japan expanded with several new members, including David Finlay, Juice Robinson, Kushida and Ricochet. On April 4, Taguchi, Ricochet and Tanahashi defeated L.I.J. to bring the NEVER Openweight 6-Man Tag Team Championship back to Taguchi Japan. They lost the title back to L.I.J. on May 3 at Wrestling Dontaku 2017. Taguchi then took part in the 2017 Best of the Super Juniors, where he finished with a record of four wins and three losses, failing to advance to the finals.

Taguchi then formed a new tag team named "Funky Future" with Ricochet under the banner of Taguchi Japan. On August 13, the two defeated The Young Bucks to win the IWGP Junior Heavyweight Tag Team Championship. They lost the title to Roppongi 3K (Sho and Yoh) on October 9 at King of Pro-Wrestling. In May 2018, he entered the Best of the Super Juniors tournament. He finished the tournament with 3 wins and 4 losses, failing to advance to the finals. On the final night of the G1 Climax 28, Taguchi under the guise of Pro Wrestler Sengoku Embu teamed with Kushida and Rey Mysterio Jr. to defeat the team of Chaos' Kazuchika Okada, Sho and Yoh.

On January 30, 2019, Makabe, Taguchi and Yano defeated Bullet Club to win the NEVER Openweight 6-Man Tag Team Championship. On March 10, Taguchi would compete in the New Japan Cup, replacing an injured David Finlay, and defeat Hiroyoshi Tenzan in the first round. In the second round, he lost to Hiroshi Tanahashi. In November 2020, he entered the Best of the super juniors tournament. He finished the tournament with 8 points (4 wins and 5 losses), failing to advance to the finals. In August, Taguchi entered the Super J-Cup, defeating Jonathan Gresham in the first round. In round 2, Taguchi lost to Dragon Lee. In October, Taguchi teamed with Rocky Romero in the Super Junior Tag League. The team finished with 8 points, failing o advance to the finals. On Night 2 of Wrestle Kingdom 14 on January 5, 2020, Taguchi, Makabe and Yano lost the Never Openweight 6-Man Tag Team Championships to Los Ingobernables de Japon, ending their reign at 340 days.

In June, Taguchi entered the New Japan Cup, but was quickly eliminated by Sanada. In September, Taguchi teamed with Master Wato in a tournament to crown new IWGP Junior Heavyweight Tag Team Champions, the duo failed to win the vacant titles after scoring 2 points in the tournament, but began to team frequently. In November, Taguchi entered the Best of the Super Juniors tournament but failed to advance to the finals, after scoring only 8 points. In January 2021, on nigh 2 of Wrestle Kingdom 15, Taguchi and Wato, unsuccessfully challenged El Desperado and Yoshinobu Kanemaru for the IWGP Junior Heavyweight Tag Team Championships.

In July at Wrestle Grand Slam in Tokyo Dome, Taguchi and Rocky Romero challenged El Phantasmo and Taiji Ishimori for the IWGP Junior Heavyweight Tag Team Championships. In August, Taguchi returned to teaming with Wato in the Super Junior Tag League, they narrowly failed to advance the finals, finishing with 6 points. In September, Taguchi made his NJPW Strong debut in the US, teaming with Rocky Romero to defeat the West Coast Wrecking Crew. In November, Taguchi competed in the Best of the Super Juniors tournament, finishing with 10 pints, failing to advance to the finals. In January 2022, Taguchi and Romero, competed in a three-way tag-team match, for the IWGP Junior Heavyweight Tag Team Championships, where they and Ishimori and Phantasmo, failed to defeat champions Robbie Eagles and Tiger Mask.

At NJPW New Years Golden Series later in January, Wato and Taguchi (now called Six or Nine) successfully captured the IWGP Junior Heavyweight Tag Team Championships. In March, Taguchi entered the New Japan Cup, but was eliminated in the first round by Evil. Six or Nine made their first successful tag team title defense at Hyper Battle, defeating Bullet Club's Cutest Tag Team (El Phantasmo and Taiji Ishimori). In May, they made a second successful defense against Suzuki-Gun's Yoshinobu Kanemaru and Douki. Later in the month, Taguchi competed in the Best of the Super Juniors tournament, competing in the A Block. He finished the tournament, with 6 points, finishing last in his block. On the final day, Six or Nine lost to United Empire's T.J. Perkins and Francesco Akira in a non-title match. Due to this loss, Six or Nine defended the titles in a rematch, where they lost the championships to Akira and TJP, ending their reign at 121 days. Six or Nine, failed to win the titles back in a rematch at Burning Spirit.

In November, Taguchi teamed with Clark Connors in the 2022 Super Junior Tag League. The duo finished the tournament with 6 points, failing to advance to the finals. At Wrestle Kingdom 17, Taguchi competed in the New Japan Rambo, but failed to last till the final 4. In May. Taguchi was announced to be participating in the A Block of the Best of the Super Juniors. Taguchi finished bottom of the block, scoring just 2 points and failing to advance to the semi-finals.

== Other media ==
In 2015, Taguchi began performing as a singer character named "Akira Michishirube". Taguchi, as Michishirube, released his first CD on July 27, 2016.

== Championships and accomplishments ==
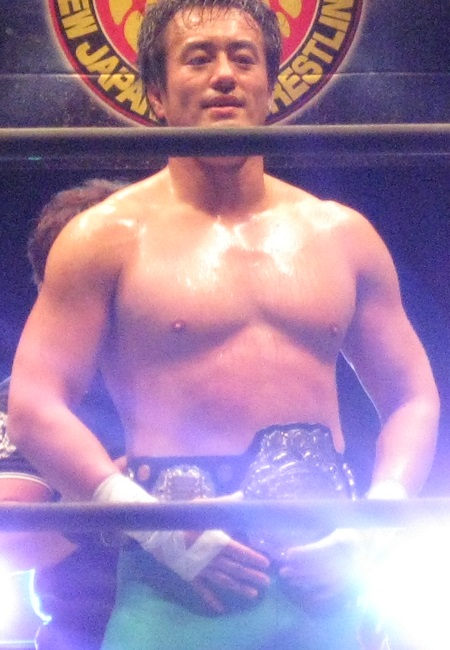
Taguchi as the IWGP Junior Heavyweight Champion in September 2014

- Consejo Mundial de Lucha Libre
  - CMLL World Welterweight Championship (1 time)
- DDT Pro Wrestling
  - DDT Universal Championship (1 time, current)
- Kaientai Dojo
  - Best Tag Team Match (2010) with Prince Devitt vs. Makoto Oishi and Shiori Asahi on April 17
- New Japan Pro-Wrestling
  - IWGP Junior Heavyweight Championship (2 times)
  - IWGP Junior Heavyweight Tag Team Championship (7 times) – with El Samurai (1), Prince Devitt (4), Ricochet (1) and Master Wato (1)
  - NEVER Openweight 6-Man Tag Team Championship (3 times) – with Manabu Nakanishi and Hiroshi Tanahashi (1), Hiroshi Tanahashi and Ricochet (1) and Toru Yano and Togi Makabe (1)
  - Best of the Super Juniors (2012)
  - Young Lion Cup (2004)
  - Young Lion Toukon Tournament (2004)
  - J Sports Crown Openweight 6 Man Tag Tournament (2010, 2011) – with Prince Devitt and Hirooki Goto
  - IWGP Junior Heavyweight Tag Team Title #1 Contendership Tournament (2003) - with Hirooki Goto
- Pro Wrestling Illustrated
  - PWI ranked him #102 of the top 500 singles wrestlers in the PWI 500 in 2015
- Tokyo Sports
  - Best Bout Award (2010) with Prince Devitt vs. Kenny Omega and Kota Ibushi (NJPW, October 11)
- Toryumon Mexico
  - Yamaha Cup (2005) – with Hiromi Horiguchi

Preceded by Kota Ibushi	Best of the Super Juniors winner 2012	Succeeded by Prince Devitt
