= Super Junior Tag League =

NJPW tag team tournament

Super Junior Tag League trophy

The Super Junior Tag League is a professional wrestling tag team tournament held by New Japan Pro-Wrestling (NJPW).

Established in 2010, but preceded by the G1 Climax Junior Heavyweight Tag League in 2001 (won by El Samurai and Jushin Thunder Liger), it is the junior heavyweight equivalent of the World Tag League for heavyweight tag teams. From 2010 to 2017, it was named the Super Junior Tag Tournament and followed a single-elimination format, before becoming the Super Junior Tag League in 2018, switching to a round-robin format. Since the tournament's inception, there were two years where the tournament did not take place—in 2011 and 2020 (due to major changes to NJPW's schedule during the COVID-19 pandemic). The winning team traditionally earns the right to challenge for the IWGP Junior Heavyweight Tag Team Championship at the following year's Wrestle Kingdom, assuming the team does not hold the title at the time of their victory.

== Pre-existing Junior Tag Tournaments (1994–2003) ==
New Japan Pro Wrestling hosted several Junior Heavyweight Tag Team tournaments before making it an annual institution. These include:

Tournament	Year	Winner	Final venue	Ref.
Super Grade Jr. Heavyweight Tag League	1994	Shinjiro Otani and Wild Pegasus	JCB Hall	
Junior Heavyweight Super Grade Tag League	1996	The Great Sasuke and Black Tiger (II)	?	
IWGP Junior Heavyweight Tag Team Title League	1998	Shinjiro Otani and Tatsuhito Takaiwa	Osaka Dome	
G1 Junior Tag League 2001	2001	Jushin Thunder Liger and El Samurai	Korakuen Hall	
Dream Win Junior Tag Team Tournament	2002	El Samurai and Gedo	Korakuen Hall	
IWGP Junior Heavyweight Tag Team Title (#1 Contendership) (Note: Taguchi & Goto won the original contendership tournament, whilst Jado & Gedo won an impromptu second phase and the resulting title match between both winning teams) Tournament	2003	(Ryusuke Taguchi and Hirooki Goto) / Jado and Gedo	Tsu City Gymnasium	

=== 1994 ===
The first such tournament was a round-robin league that took place from October 9 to October 18, 1994, four years before the junior heavyweight division had tag team championship belts.

Final Standings
Shinjiro Otani and Wild Pegasus	10
Black Tiger and Great Sasuke	10
Dean Malenko and Tokimitsu Ishizawa	10
Norio Honaga and Gran Hamada	10
Super Delfin and TAKA Michinoku	8
Flying Scorpio and El Samurai	6
Masayoshi Motegi and Kamikaze	2
Shoichi Funaki and Yuki Ishikawa	0

Results	Otani Pegasus	Tiger Sasuke	Malenko Ishizawa	Honaga Hamada	Delfin Michinoku	Scorpio Samurai	Motegi Kamikaze	Funaki Ishikawa
Otani Pegasus	—N/a	Tiger; Sasuke (13:11)	Otani; Pegasus (13:26)	Otani; Pegasus (12:37)	Delfin; Michinoku (11:40)	Otani; Pegasus (13:57)	Otani; Pegasus (12:06)	Otani; Pegasus (12:30)
Tiger Sasuke	Tiger; Sasuke (13:11)	—N/a	Tiger; Sasuke (15:27)	Honaga; Hamada (13:11)	Delfin; Michinoku (15:01)	Tiger; Sasuke (17:45)	Tiger; Sasuke (14:51)	Tiger; Sasuke (forfeit)
Malenko Ishizawa	Otani; Pegasus (13:26)	Tiger; Sasuke (15:27)	—N/a	Malenko; Ishizawa (13:55)	Malenko; Ishizawa (13:46)	Malenko; Ishizawa (12:23)	Malenko; Ishizawa (9:39)	Malenko; Ishizawa (8:10)
Honaga Hamada	Otani; Pegasus (12:37)	Honaga; Hamada (13:11)	Malenko; Ishizawa (13:55)	—N/a	Honaga; Hamada (13:38)	Honaga; Hamada (14:28)	Honaga; Hamada (10:42)	Honaga; Hamada (8:13)
Delfin Michinoku	Delfin; Michinoku (11:40)	Delfin; Michinoku (15:01)	Malenko; Ishizawa (13:46)	Honaga; Hamada (13:38)	—N/a	Scorpio; Samurai (12:32)	Delfin; Michinoku (14:33)	Delfin; Michinoku (forfeit)
Scorpio Samurai	Otani; Pegasus (13:57)	Tiger; Sasuke (17:45)	Malenko; Ishizawa (12:23)	Honaga; Hamada (14:28)	Scorpio; Samurai (12:32)	—N/a	Scorpio; Samurai (13:43)	Scorpio; Samurai (forfeit)
Motegi Kamikaze	Otani; Pegasus (12:06)	Tiger; Sasuke (14:51)	Malenko; Ishizawa (9:39)	Honaga; Hamada (10:42)	Delfin; Michinoku (14:33)	Scorpio; Samurai (13:43)	—N/a	Motegi; Kamikaze (forfeit)
Funaki Ishikawa	Otani; Pegasus (12:30)	Tiger; Sasuke (forfeit)	Malenko; Ishizawa (8:10)	Honaga; Hamada (8:13)	Delfin; Michinoku (forfeit)	Scorpio; Samurai (forfeit)	Motegi; Kamikaze (forfeit)	—N/a

Semifinals
1	Shinjiro Otani and Wild Pegasus
1	Dean Malenko and Tokimitsu Ishizawa	14:28
1	Black Tiger and Great Sasuke
1	Norio Honaga and Gran Hamada	11:42

Final
1	Shinjiro Otani and Wild Pegasus
1	Black Tiger and Great Sasuke	18:14

=== 1996 ===
According to at least one source, The Great Sasuke and Black Tiger (II) won a "Junior Heavyweight Super Grade Tag League" for NJPW in 1996. However, as no such tournament seems to appear in records, it's possible that this was either a transcription error of that team making the 1994 final, or of an IWGP Junior Heavyweight Championship match they had against one another in 1996.

=== 1998 ===
In 1998, from July 31 to August 8, NJPW held a tournament to crown the first ever IWGP Junior Heavyweight Tag Team Champions. It followed a round-robin format between four teams, with a final round between the two top scorers.

Final standings
Shinjiro Otani and Tatsuhito Takaiwa	2
Dr. Wagner Jr. and Koji Kanemoto	2
El Samurai and Jushin Thunder Liger	1
Kendo Kashin and Yuji Yasuraoka	1

Results	Otani and Takaiwa	Wagner Jr. and Kanemoto	Samurai and Liger	Kashin and Yasuraoka
Otani and Takaiwa	–	Otani and Takaiwa (15:47)	Otani and Takaiwa (14:50)	Kashin and Yasuraoka (11:15)
Wagner Jr. and Kanemoto	Otani and Takaiwa (15:47)	–	Wagner Jr. and Kanemoto (19:01)	Wagner Jr. and Kanemoto (19:03)
Samurai and Liger	Otani and Takaiwa (14:50)	Wagner Jr. and Kanemoto (19:01)	–	Samurai and Liger (11:40)
Kashin and Yasuraoka	Kashin and Yasuraoka (11:15)	Wagner Jr. and Kanemoto (19:03)	Samurai and Liger (11:40)	–

Final
1	Shinjiro Otani and Tatsuhito Takaiwa
2	Dr. Wagner Jr. and Koji Kanemoto	20:13

=== 2001 ===
The G1 Junior Tag League was a round-robin tournament that took place from November 16 to November 25, 2001. The finals saw the previous champions, El Samurai and Jushin Thunder Liger, defeat the reigning team that had taken the belts from them months prior in Jado & Gedo. This was presumably considered retribution enough, as a rematch for the belts never occurred. Nonetheless, the team to eventually dethrone Jado & Gedo the following May did consist of one of the League's winners.

Final Standings
Jushin Thunder Liger and El Samurai	7
Jado and Gedo	7
Minoru Tanaka and Masayuki Naruse	6
Kendo Kashin and Black Tiger (III)	4
Masahito Kakihara and Gran Naniwa	4
Katsuyori Shibata and Wataru Inoue	2

Matches	Liger Samurai	Jado Gedo	Tanaka Naruse	Kashin Tiger	Kakihara Naniwa	Shibata Inoue
Liger Samurai	—N/a	Draw (30:00)	Liger; Samurai (16:40)	Liger; Samurai (13:14)	Liger; Samurai (17:10)	Shibata; Inoue (14:46)
Jado Gedo	Draw (30:00)	—N/a	Tanaka; Naruse (15:36)	Jado; Gedo^{DQ} (9:18)	Jado; Gedo (12:12)	Jado; Gedo (14:25)
Tanaka Naruse	Liger; Samurai (16:40)	Tanaka; Naruse (15:36)	—N/a	Tanaka; Naruse (10:04)	Kakihara; Naniwa (15:50)	Tanaka; Naruse (6:29)
Kashin Tiger	Liger; Samurai (13:14)	Jado; Gedo^{DQ} (9:18)	Tanaka; Naruse (10:04)	—N/a	Tiger; Kashin (8:05)	Tiger; Kashin (14:07)
Kakihara Naniwa	Liger; Samurai (17:10)	Jado; Gedo (12:12)	Kakihara; Naniwa (15:50)	Tiger; Kashin (8:05)	—N/a	Kakihara; Naniwa (10:42)
Shibata Inoue	Shibata; Inoue (14:46)	Jado; Gedo (14:25)	Tanaka; Naruse (6:29)	Tiger; Kashin (14:07)	Kakihara; Naniwa (10:42)	—N/a

Final
Jushin Thunder Liger and El Samurai
Jado and Gedo	21:10

=== 2002 ===
This was a one night tournament that took place on December 23, 2002 in Korakuen Hall, at the NJPW Dream Win 2002 event. Unlike the previous tournaments, this was a single-elimination format, and - owing to the limited time - featured only 4 teams. The teams were apparently drawn at random on the night, in-fitting with the event's irreverent holiday theming. As such, a shot at the tag titles was not in consideration.

Round 1
El Samurai and Gedo
Jushin Thunder Liger and Masayuki Naruse	14:18
Masahito Kakihara and Tiger Mask
Heat and Koji Kanemoto	11:51

Final
El Samurai and Gedo
Masahito Kakihara and Tiger Mask	11:37

=== 2003 ===
This was initially another four-team single-elimination tournament, for #1 contendership of the IWGP Junior Heavyweight Tag Team Championship. This time spread across three nights, from October 31 to November 2, 2003. However, two days after the final, reigning champions Jushin Thunder Liger and Koji Kanemoto vacated the titles due to Kanemoto suffering an injury. So another such tournament was held between November 24 and 29 (reintegrating several who had lost in the first). The original "block's" winning team of Hirooki Goto and Ryusuke Taguchi thus fought Jado & Gedo later in the night of the November 29 event in a match for the vacant championships, which Jado & Gedo won.

Results

Round 1
Hirooki Goto and Ryusuke Taguchi
El Samurai and Wataru Inoue	9:28
Masahito Kakihara and Masayuki Naruse
Heat and Tiger Mask	11:27
El Samurai and Jushin Thunder Liger
American Dragon and Katsushi Takemura	13:31
Heat and Tiger Mask
Jado and Gedo	15:24

Semifinals
Hirooki Goto and Ryusuke Taguchi
Masahito Kakihara and Masayuki Naruse	10:24
El Samurai and Jushin Thunder Liger
Jado and Gedo	16:52

Final
Hirooki Goto and Ryusuke Taguchi
Jado and Gedo	12:23

== Super Junior Tag Tournament (2010–2017) ==
Tournament	Year	Winner	SJTT won (team)	SJTT won (individual)	Final venue	Ref.
Super J Tag Tournament	2010	El Samurai and Koji Kanemoto	1	1, 1	JCB Hall	
Super J Tag League	2010 (2)	Jado and Gedo	1	1, 1	Differ Ariake	
Super Jr. Tag Tournament	2012	Time Splitters (Alex Shelley and Kushida)	1	1, 1	Korakuen Hall	
Super Jr. Tag Tournament	2013	The Young Bucks (Matt Jackson and Nick Jackson)	1	1, 1	Korakuen Hall	
Super Jr. Tag Tournament	2014	reDRagon (Bobby Fish and Kyle O'Reilly)	1	1, 1	Gifu Industry Hall	
Super Jr. Tag Tournament	2015	Matt Sydal and Ricochet	1	1, 1	Osaka Prefectural Gymnasium	
Super Jr. Tag Tournament	2016	Roppongi Vice (Beretta and Rocky Romero)	1	1, 1	Edion Arena Osaka	
Super Jr. Tag Tournament	2017	Roppongi 3K (Sho and Yoh)	1	1, 1	Osaka Prefectural Gymnasium	

=== 2010 ===
Super J Tag Tournament was a one-night professional wrestling tournament hosted by New Japan Pro-Wrestling and took place on May 8. Most of the wrestlers involved were signed to New Japan but did feature wrestlers from other promotions like Mascara Dorada & Valiente from Consejo Mundial de Lucha Libre, Kota Ibushi from Dramatic Dream Team, Fujita Hayato and Taro Nohashi from Michinoku Pro Wrestling, and Kushida from Smash.

El Samurai and Koji Kanemoto defeated Apollo 55 (Prince Devitt and Ryusuke Taguchi) to win the tournament and become IWGP Junior Heavyweight Tag Team Champions.

Results

Round 1
Fujita Hayato and Taro Nohashi	Pin
Jushin Thunder Liger and Nobuo Yoshihashi	10:51
El Samurai and Koji Kanemoto	Sub
Davey Richards and Tama Tonga	10:50
Gedo and Kushida	Pin
Austin Creed and Kota Ibushi	13:18
Prince Devitt and Ryusuke Taguchi	Pin
Mascara Dorada and Valiente	7:59

Semifinals
Fujita Hayato and Taro Nohashi	Sub
El Samurai and Koji Kanemoto	12:45
Gedo and Kushida	Pin
Prince Devitt and Ryusuke Taguchi	11:36

Final
El Samurai and Koji Kanemoto	Pin
Prince Devitt and Ryusuke Taguchi	21:27

=== Super J Tag League ===
Six months after the first Super J Tag Tournament, from November 9 to November 13, 2010, NJPW held the year's second junior heavyweight tag team tournament entitled the "Super J Tag League". As the name suggests, it followed round-robin rules instead of the single-elimination format that the Super J Tag Tournament used. It included ten teams split across two blocks. The winning team of Jado and Gedo received a title match against The Golden Lovers at a Dramatic Dream Team event on December 26, which they lost.

Standings
Block A		Block B	
Davey Richards and Rocky Romero	6	Jado and Gedo	6
Prince Devitt and Ryusuke Taguchi	6	Koji Kanemoto and Tiger Mask	6
La Sombra and Mascara Dorada	4	AKIRA and KUSHIDA	4
FUJITA and NOSAWA Rongai	2	Masaaki Mochizuki and Super Shisa	2
El Samurai and Jushin Thunder Liger	2	Fujita Hayato and Taro Nohashi	2

Block A	Richards Romero	Devitt Taguchi	Sombra Dorada	FUJITA NOSAWA	Samurai Liger
Richards Romero	—	Richards; Romero (14:41)	Sombra; Dorada (12:30)	Richards; Romero (10:06)	Richards; Romero (12:44)
Devitt Taguchi	Richards; Romero (14:41)	—	Devitt; Taguchi (9:04)	Devitt; Taguchi (9:44)	Devitt; Taguchi (14:11)
Sombra Dorada	Sombra; Dorada (12:30)	Devitt; Taguchi (9:04)	—	Sombra; Dorada (11:35)	Samurai; Liger (11:56)
FUJITA NOSAWA	Richards; Romero (10:06)	Devitt; Taguchi (9:44)	Sombra; Dorada (11:35)	—	FUJITA; NOSAWA (11:38)
Samurai Liger	Richards; Romero (12:44)	Devitt; Taguchi (14:11)	Samurai; Liger (11:56)	FUJITA; NOSAWA (11:38)	—
Block B	Jado Gedo	Kanemoto Tiger	AKIRA KUSHIDA	Mochizuki Shisa	Hayato Nohashi
Jado Gedo	—	Jado; Gedo (12:27)	Jado; Gedo (13:47)	Mochizuki Knight (14:41)	Jado; Gedo (12:59)
Kanemoto Tiger	Jado; Gedo (12:27)	—	Kanemoto; Tiger (14:00)	Kanemoto; Tiger (11:50)	Kanemoto; Tiger (11:58)
AKIRA KUSHIDA	Jado; Gedo (13:47)	Kanemoto; Tiger (14:00)	—	AKIRA; KUSHIDA (12:25)	AKIRA; KUSHIDA (13:00)
Mochizuki Shisa	Mochizuki Knight (14:41)	Kanemoto; Tiger (11:50)	AKIRA; KUSHIDA (12:25)	—	Hayato; Nohashi (12:49)
Hayato Nohashi	Jado; Gedo (12:59)	Kanemoto; Tiger (11:58)	AKIRA; KUSHIDA (13:00)	Hayato; Nohashi (12:49)	—

Final
A	Davey Richards and Rocky Romero
B	Jado and Gedo	23:00

=== 2012 ===
Super Jr. Tag Tournament 2012 was a two-night professional wrestling tournament hosted by New Japan Pro-Wrestling. The preliminary round took place on October 21 and the semi-final and final took place on November 2. The tournament utilized wrestlers mostly signed to New Japan but also included Negro Casas from Consejo Mundial de Lucha Libre, Taka Michinoku from Kaientai Dojo, and freelancer Brian Kendrick.

Time Splitters (Alex Shelley and Kushida) defeated Apollo 55 (Prince Devitt and Ryusuke Taguchi) to win the tournament and become the number one contenders to the IWGP Junior Heavyweight Tag Team Championship. They challenged the IWGP Junior Heavyweight Tag Team Champions Forever Hooligans (Alex Koslov and Rocky Romero) to a title match at Power Struggle on November 11.

Results

Round 1
Jushin Thunder Liger and Tiger Mask	Pin
Alex Koslov and Rocky Romero	9:28
Prince Devitt and Ryusuke Taguchi	Pin
Brian Kendrick and Low Ki	10:03
Alex Shelley and Kushida	Pin
Jado and Gedo	13:26
Bushi and Negro Casas	Pin
Taichi and Taka Michinoku	10:24

Semifinals
Alex Koslov and Rocky Romero	Pin
Prince Devitt and Ryusuke Taguchi	9:19
Alex Shelley and Kushida	Pin
Taichi and Taka Michinoku	8:13

Final
Prince Devitt and Ryusuke Taguchi	Pin
Alex Shelley and Kushida	16:42

=== 2013 ===
The 2013 Super Jr. Tag Tournament was a two-night professional wrestling tournament hosted by New Japan Pro-Wrestling. The preliminary round took take place on October 25 and the semi-final and final on November 6. The debuting Young Bucks won the tournament and on November 9 at Power Struggle, defeated Taichi and Taka Michinoku to also win the IWGP Junior Heavyweight Tag Team Championship.

Results

Round 1
Jushin Thunder Liger and Tiger Mask	Pin
Jado and Gedo	9:16
Beretta and Brian Kendrick	Pin
The Young Bucks	10:35
Kushida and Yohei Komatsu	Pin
Bushi and Valiente	9:37
Forever Hooligans	Pin
Taichi and Taka Michinoku	9:06

Semifinals
Jado and Gedo	Pin
The Young Bucks	9:31
Bushi and Valiente	Pin
Forever Hooligans	10:28

Final
The Young Bucks	Pin
Forever Hooligans	19:13

=== 2014 ===
The 2014 Super Jr. Tag Tournament was a four-night professional wrestling tournament hosted by New Japan Pro-Wrestling. The preliminary round took place on October 25, the semifinals on November 1 and 2, and the final on November 3. For the third year in a row, the tournament's winning team, reDRagon, went on to also capture the IWGP Junior Heavyweight Tag Team Championship at Power Struggle.

Results

Round 1
Jushin Thunder Liger and Tiger Mask	Pin
The Young Bucks	8:32
Fuego and Ryusuke Taguchi	Pin
El Desperado and Taichi	12:19
Time Splitters	Pin
Forever Hooligans	15:43
Bushi and Máscara Dorada	Pin
reDRagon	10:21

Semifinals
The Young Bucks	Pin
El Desperado and Taichi	12:04
Forever Hooligans	Pin
reDRagon	15:03

Final
The Young Bucks	Pin
reDRagon	15:04

=== 2015 ===
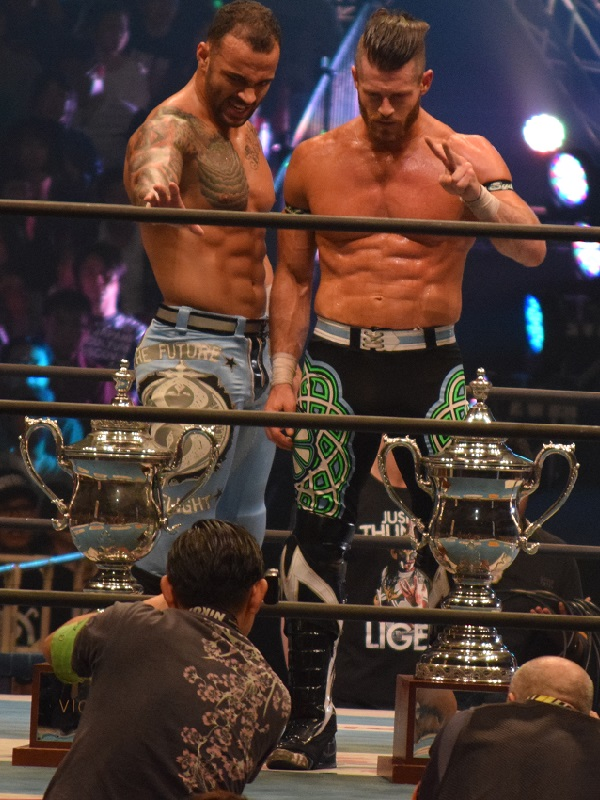
Ricochet and Matt Sydal upon winning the tournament in 2015

The 2015 Super Jr. Tag Tournament is a three-night professional wrestling tournament hosted by New Japan Pro-Wrestling. The preliminary round took place on October 24, the semifinals on November 1, and the final on November 7 at Power Struggle.

Results

Round 1
Jushin Thunder Liger and Tiger Mask	Pin
reDRagon	10:24
Roppongi Vice	Pin
Chase Owens and Kenny Omega	13:11
Máscara Dorada and Ryusuke Taguchi	Pin
The Young Bucks	11:08
Time Splitters	Pin
Matt Sydal and Ricochet	18:48

Semifinals
reDRagon	Pin
Roppongi Vice	20:06
The Young Bucks	Pin
Matt Sydal and Ricochet	12:05

Final
Roppongi Vice	Pin
Matt Sydal and Ricochet	16:06

=== 2016 ===
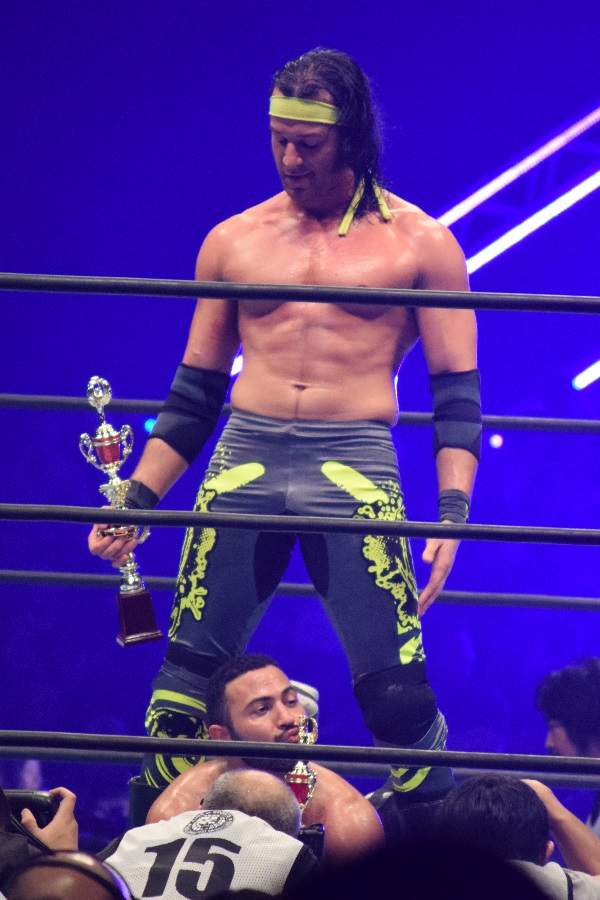
Roppongi Vice upon winning the tournament in 2016

The 2016 Super Jr. Tag Tournament was a four-night professional wrestling tournament hosted by New Japan Pro-Wrestling. The preliminary round took place on October 21 and 25, the semifinals on October 30, and the final on November 5 at Power Struggle.

Results

Round 1
Jushin Thunder Liger and Tiger Mask	Sub
Fuego and Ryusuke Taguchi	9:55
Ángel de Oro and Titán	Pin
Roppongi Vice	12:55
David Finlay Jr. and Ricochet	Pin
Gedo and Will Ospreay	8:47
A. C. H. and Taiji Ishimori	Pin
The Young Bucks	17:40

Semifinals
Fuego and Ryusuke Taguchi	Pin
Roppongi Vice	15:26
David Finlay and Ricochet	Pin
ACH and Taiji Ishimori	15:57

Final
Roppongi Vice	Pin
ACH and Taiji Ishimori	18:49

=== 2017 ===
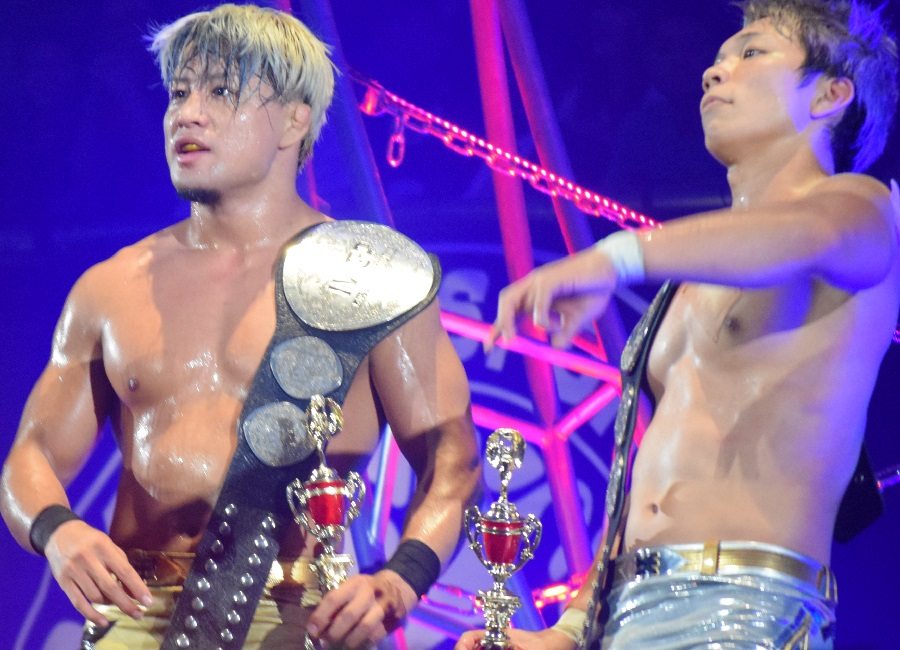
Roppongi 3K upon winning the tournament in 2017

The 2017 Super Jr. Tag Tournament was a four-night professional wrestling tournament hosted by New Japan Pro-Wrestling. The preliminary round took place on October 23 and 29, the semifinals on October 30, and the final on November 5 at Power Struggle.

Results

Round 1
Hirai Kawato and Kushida	Pin
Roppongi 3K	12:39
Dragon Lee and Titán	Pin
Bushi and Hiromu Takahashi	20:20
Jushin Thunder Liger and Tiger Mask	Pin
El Desperado and Yoshinobu Kanemaru	17:28
A. C. H. and Ryusuke Taguchi	Pin
Taichi and Taka Michinoku	18:42

Semifinals
Roppongi 3K	Pin
Bushi and Hiromu Takahashi	20:34
El Desperado and Yoshinobu Kanemaru	Pin
ACH and Ryusuke Taguchi	17:06

Final
Roppongi 3K	Pin
ACH and Ryusuke Taguchi	15:51

== Super Junior Tag League (2018–present) ==
Tournament	Year	Winner	SJTL won (team)	SJTL won (individual)	Final venue	Ref.	Total won (team)	Total won (individual)
Super Jr. Tag League	2018	Roppongi 3K (Sho and Yoh)	1	1, 1	Osaka Prefectural Gymnasium		2	2, 2
Super Jr. Tag League	2019	Roppongi 3K (Sho and Yoh)	2	2, 2	Osaka Prefectural Gymnasium		3	3, 3
Vacant Championship Tournament	2020	El Desperado and Yoshinobu Kanemaru	-	-	Korakuen Hall		-	-
Super Jr. Tag League	2021	El Desperado and Yoshinobu Kanemaru	1	1, 1	Korakuen Hall		1	1, 1
Super Jr. Tag League	2022	LiYoh (Lio Rush and Yoh)	1	1, 3	Sendai Sunplaza Hall		1	1, 4
Super Jr. Tag League	2023	Catch 2/2 (TJP and Francesco Akira)	1	1, 1	Osaka Prefectural Gymnasium		1	1, 1
Super Jr. Tag League	2024	Ichiban Sweet Boys (Robbie Eagles and Kosei Fujita)	1	1, 1	EDION Arena Osaka		1	1, 1
Super Jr. Tag League	2025	House of Torture (Douki and Sho)	1	1, 3	Gifu Memorial Center Gymnasium		1	1, 4
Super Jr. Tag League	2026	Unbound Co. (Taiji Ishimori and Robbie X)	1	1, 1	Hiroshima Sun Plaza Hall		1	1, 1

=== 2018 ===
The 2018 Super Jr. Tag League was a thirteen-night professional wrestling tournament hosted by New Japan Pro-Wrestling. It featured eight teams in a single block. Block matches were held from October 16 to November 1, 2018 with the first and second placed teams advancing to the final, on November 3, at Power Struggle. Due to a three-way tie at the top of the standings, the final was a three-way tag team match between the qualified teams.

Final standings
El Desperado and Yoshinobu Kanemaru	10
Bushi and Shingo Takagi	10
Sho and Yoh	10
Taiji Ishimori and Robbie Eagles	6
Kushida and Chris Sabin	6
Ryusuke Taguchi and A. C. H.	6
Jushin Thunder Liger and Tiger Mask	4
Volador Jr. and Soberano Jr.	4

Results	Bushi Takagi	Liger Tiger	Kushida Sabin	Taguchi A. C. H.	Volador Soberano	Sho Yoh	Ishimori Eagles	Kanemaru Desperado
Bushi Takagi	—N/a	Liger; Tiger (10:30)	Bushi; Takagi (16:53)	Bushi; Takagi (12:20)	Bushi; Takagi (13:42)	Bushi; Takagi (21:18)	Bushi; Takagi (14:00)	Kanemaru; Desperado (18:04)
Liger Tiger	Liger; Tiger (10:30)	—N/a	Kushida; Sabin (10:20)	ACH; Taguchi (12:42)	Liger; Tiger (11:06)	Sho; Yoh (11:33)	Ishimori; Eagles (11:04)	Kanemaru; Desperado (11:55)
Kushida Sabin	Bushi; Takagi (16:53)	Kushida; Sabin (10:20)	—N/a	Kushida; Sabin (13:58)	Kushida; Sabin (10:32)	Sho; Yoh (15:18)	Ishimori; Eagles (12:31)	Kanemaru; Desperado (14:40)
Taguchi A. C. H.	Bushi; Takagi (12:20)	ACH; Taguchi (12:42)	Kushida; Sabin (13:58)	—N/a	Volador; Soberano (10:33)	ACH; Taguchi (18:33)	Ishimori; Eagles (13:33)	ACH; Taguchi (13:17)
Volador Soberano	Bushi; Takagi (13:42)	Liger; Tiger (11:06)	Kushida; Sabin (10:32)	Volador; Soberano (10:33)	—N/a	Sho; Yoh (11:55)	Volador; Soberano (8:56)	Kanemaru; Desperado (12:32)
Sho Yoh	Bushi; Takagi (21:18)	Sho; Yoh (11:33)	Sho; Yoh (15:18)	ACH; Taguchi (18:33)	Sho; Yoh (11:55)	—N/a	Sho; Yoh (10:50)	Sho; Yoh (13:14)
Ishimori Eagles	Bushi; Takagi (14:00)	Ishimori; Eagles (11:04)	Ishimori; Eagles (12:31)	Ishimori; Eagles (13:33)	Volador; Soberano (8:56)	Sho; Yoh (10:50)	—N/a	Kanemaru; Desperado (10:02)
Desperado Kanemaru	Kanemaru; Desperado (18:04)	Kanemaru; Desperado (11:55)	Kanemaru; Desperado (14:40)	ACH; Taguchi (13:17)	Kanemaru; Desperado (12:32)	Sho; Yoh (13:14)	Kanemaru; Desperado (10:02)	—N/a

Final
1	Sho and Yoh	Pin
1 1	Bushi and Takagi Desperado and Kanemaru	15:55

=== 2019 ===
The 2019 Super Jr. Tag League is a fifteen-night professional wrestling tournament hosted by New Japan Pro-Wrestling. It features eight teams in a single block, with the first and second placed teams advancing to a final. Block matches were held from October 16 to November 1, 2019, on the Road to Power Struggle tour, and the final was held on November 3, 2019, at Power Struggle.

Final Standings
El Desperado and Yoshinobu Kanemaru	10
Sho and Yoh	10
Taiji Ishimori and El Phantasmo	10
Will Ospreay and Robbie Eagles	8
Volador and Titán	8
Ryusuke Taguchi and Rocky Romero	8
T. J. Perkins and Clark Connors	2
Tiger Mask and Yuya Uemura	0

Results	Sho Yoh	Ishimori Phantasmo	Desperado Kanemaru	Ospreay Eagles	Taguchi Romero	Volador Titán	Tiger Uemura	TJP Connors
Sho Yoh	—N/a	Sho; Yoh (17:28)	Desperado; Kanemaru (15:28)	Sho; Yoh (21:15)	Taguchi; Romero (23:12)	Sho; Yoh (16:25)	Sho; Yoh (16:10)	Sho; Yoh (13:31)
Ishimori Phantasmo	Sho; Yoh (17:28)	—N/a	Desperado; Kanemaru (15:36)	Ishimori; Phantasmo (22:17)	Ishimori; Phantasmo (15:58)	Ishimori; Phantasmo (14:22)	Ishimori; Phantasmo (11:36)	Ishimori; Phantasmo (11:13)
Desperado Kanemaru	Desperado; Kanemaru (15:28)	Desperado; Kanemaru (15:36)	—N/a	Desperado; Kanemaru (16:24)	Taguchi; Romero (13:43)	Volador; Titán (12:03)	Desperado; Kanemaru (14:55)	Desperado; Kanemaru (12:18)
Ospreay Eagles	Sho; Yoh (21:15)	Ishimori; Phantasmo (22:17)	Desperado; Kanemaru (16:24)	—N/a	Ospreay; Eagles (22:13)	Ospreay; Eagles (10:58)	Ospreay; Eagles (11:33)	Ospreay; Eagles (15:30)
Taguchi Romero	Taguchi; Romero (23:12)	Ishimori; Phantasmo (15:58)	Taguchi; Romero (13:43)	Ospreay; Eagles (22:13)	—N/a	Volador; Titán (13:57)	Taguchi; Romero (12:32)	Taguchi; Romero (15:37)
Volador Titán	Sho; Yoh (16:25)	Ishimori; Phantasmo (14:22)	Volador; Titán (12:03)	Ospreay; Eagles (10:58)	Volador; Titán (13:57)	—N/a	Volador; Titán (12:58)	Volador; Titán (12:24)
Tiger Uemura	Sho; Yoh (16:10)	Ishimori; Phantasmo (11:36)	Desperado; Kanemaru (14:55)	Ospreay; Eagles (11:33)	Taguchi; Romero (12:32)	Volador; Titán (12:58)	—N/a	TJP; Connors (15:06)
TJP Connors	Sho; Yoh (13:31)	Ishimori; Phantasmo (11:13)	Desperado; Kanemaru (12:18)	Ospreay; Eagles (15:30)	Taguchi; Romero (15:37)	Volador; Titán (12:24)	TJP; Connors (15:06)	—N/a

Final
1	Desperado and Kanemaru	14:13
2	Sho and Yoh	Pin

=== 2020 ===
Whilst there was no official Super Jr. Tag League this year (largely owing to covid-19), a smaller scale round-robin tournament was held from September 5 to September 11 to crown new IWGP Junior Heavyweight Tag Team Champions after reigning champion Yoh suffered an ACL injury.

Final standings
El Desperado and Yoshinobu Kanemaru	4
Bushi and Hiromu Takahashi	4
Ryusuke Taguchi and Master Wato	2
Taiji Ishimori and Gedo	2

Results	Taguchi and Wato	Bushi and Takahashi	Desperado and Kanemaru	Ishimori and Gedo
Taguchi and Wato	–	Takahashi and Bushi (18:02)	Taguchi and Wato (13:26)	Ishimori and Gedo (14:34)
Bushi and Takahashi	Bushi and Takahashi (18:02)	–	Desperado and Kanemaru (17:15)	Bushi and Takahashi (20:54)
Desperado and Kanemaru	Taguchi and Wato (13:26)	Desperado and Kanemaru (17:15)	–	Desperado and Kanemaru (16:48)
Ishimori and Gedo	Ishimori and Gedo (14:34)	Bushi and Takahashi (20:54)	Desperado and Kanemaru (16:48)	–

Final
1	Suzuki-gun (El Desperado and Yoshinobu Kanemaru)	Pin
2	Los Ingobernables de Japón (Bushi and Hiromu Takahashi)	17:12

=== 2021 ===
The 2021 Super Jr. Tag League was a five-night professional wrestling tournament hosted by New Japan Pro-Wrestling. It featured six teams in a single block, with the team having most points at the end of the league winning the entire tournament. In case of a tie between two or more top ranked teams in the block in terms of points tiebreakers were held and the winner of the tournament would be decided. Block matches were held from 7 August to 9 August and 16 August to 17 August 2021, on the Summer Struggle 2021 tour at Korakuen Hall in Tokyo, Japan. Gedo and Dick Togo forfeited their matches against Ryusuke Taguchi and Master Wato respectively due to both having to be quarantined for being in contact with EVIL, who had been in physical contact with Shingo Takagi, who tested positive for COVID. Due to this situation, official word was of giving Taguchi and Wato a bye in the tournament, thus only two league matches were held on 16 August 2021. Sho and Yoh broke up following the events of the August 16, 2021 show, causing their match against Gedo and Dick Togo to be ruled a double forfeit.

Final Standings
El Desperado and Yoshinobu Kanemaru	8
Taiji Ishimori and El Phantasmo	8
Ryusuke Taguchi and Master Wato	6
Tiger Mask and Robbie Eagles	6
Sho and Yoh	0
Gedo and Dick Togo	0

Matches	Sho Yoh	Ishimori Phantasmo	Desperado Kanemaru	Gedo Togo	Taguchi Wato	Tiger Eagles
Sho Yoh	—N/a	Ishimori; Phantasmo (15:56)	Desperado; Kanemaru (21:52)	Double; Forfeit	Taguchi; Wato (19:01)	Tiger; Eagles (14:24)
Ishimori Phantasmo	Ishimori; Phantasmo (15:56)	—N/a	Desperado; Kanemaru (21:04)	Ishimori; Phantasmo (12:57)	Ishimori; Phantasmo (15:43)	Ishimori; Phantasmo (16:22)
Desperado Kanemaru	Desperado; Kanemaru (21:52)	Desperado; Kanemaru (21:04)	—N/a	Desperado; Kanemaru (18:56)	Desperado; Kanemaru (13:52)	Tiger; Eagles (15:45)
Gedo Togo	Double; Forfeit	Ishimori; Phantasmo (12:57)	Desperado; Kanemaru (18:56)	—N/a	Taguchi; Wato (Forfeit)	Tiger; Eagles (11:56)
Taguchi Wato	Taguchi; Wato (19:01)	Ishimori; Phantasmo (15:43)	Desperado; Kanemaru (13:52)	Taguchi; Wato (Forfeit)	—N/a	Taguchi; Wato (21:04)
Tiger Eagles	Tiger; Eagles (14:24)	Ishimori; Phantasmo (16:22)	Tiger; Eagles (15:45)	Tiger; Eagles (11:56)	Taguchi; Wato (21:04)	—N/a

=== 2022 ===
The 2022 Super Jr. Tag League was a sixteen-night professional wrestling tournament hosted by New Japan Pro-Wrestling. It featured ten teams in a single block, with the team having the most points at the end of the league winning the entire tournament. In case of a tie between two or more top-ranked teams in the block in terms of points, tiebreakers were held and the winner of the tournament would be decided. Block matches were held from November 21 to December 14, 2022, and the final took place at Sendai Sunplaza Hall in Sendai, Japan.

Standings
Ace Austin and Chris Bey	14
Lio Rush and Yoh	14
TJP and Francesco Akira	12
Alex Zayne and El Lindaman	12
Bushi and Titán	12
Yoshinobu Kanemaru and Douki	8
Ryusuke Taguchi and Clark Connors	6
Kushida and Kevin Knight	4
Robbie Eagles and Tiger Mask	4
Sho and Dick Togo	4

Results	TJP Akira	Austin Bey	Eagles Tiger	Taguchi Connors	Zayne Lindaman	Kushida Knight	Kanemaru Douki	Sho Togo	Bushi Titán	Yoh Rush
TJP Akira	—N/a	Austin; Bey (14:51)	TJP; Akira (9:17)	TJP; Akira (11:47)	TJP; Akira (18:56)	TJP; Akira (13:27)	Kanemaru; Douki (18:40)	TJP; Akira (12:41)	Bushi; Titán (14:40)	TJP; Akira (19:06)
Austin Bey	Austin; Bey (14:51)	—N/a	Austin; Bey (9:28)	Austin; Bey (7:45)	Zayne; Lindaman (18:37)	Austin; Bey (10:16)	Austin; Bey (11:10)	Austin; Bey (9:33)	Austin; Bey (13:27)	Yoh; Rush (15:01)
Eagles Tiger	TJP; Akira (9:17)	Austin; Bey (9:28)	—N/a	Taguchi; Connors (9:17)	Zayne; Lindaman (10:21)	Kushida; Knight (11:22)	Eagles; Tiger (8:38)	Eagles; Tiger (9:58)	Bushi; Titán (11:11)	Yoh; Rush (10:13)
Taguchi Connors	TJP; Akira (11:47)	Austin; Bey (7:45)	Taguchi; Connors (9:17)	—N/a	Zayne; Lindaman (10:41)	Taguchi; Connors (9:22)	Taguchi; Connors (8:21)	Sho; Togo (13:03)	Bushi; Titán (10:02)	Yoh; Rush (11:28)
Zayne Lindaman	TJP; Akira (18:56)	Zayne; Lindaman (18:37)	Zayne; Lindaman (10:21)	Zayne; Lindaman (10:41)	—N/a	Zayne; Lindaman (9:53)	Kanemaru; Douki (10:10)	Zayne; Lindaman (6:15)	Zayne; Lindaman (9:28)	Yoh; Rush (12:21)
Kushida Knight	TJP; Akira (13:27)	Austin; Bey (10:16)	Kushida; Knight (11:22)	Taguchi; Connors (9:22)	Zayne; Lindaman (9:53)	—N/a	Kanemaru; Douki (7:52)	Kushida; Knight (9:34)	Bushi; Titán (7:57)	Yoh; Rush (10:43)
Kanemaru Douki	Kanemaru; Douki (18:40)	Austin; Bey (11:10)	Eagles; Mask (8:38)	Taguchi; Connors (8:21)	Kanemaru; Douki (10:10)	Kanemaru; Douki (7:52)	—N/a	Kanemaru; Douki (12:16)	Bushi; Titán (11:41)	Yoh; Rush (10:43)
Sho Togo	TJP; Akira (12:41)	Austin; Bey (9:33)	Eagles; Mask (9:58)	Sho; Togo (13:03)	Zayne; Lindaman (6:15)	Kushida; Knight (9:34)	Kanemaru; Douki (12:16)	—N/a	Bushi; Titán (11:56)	Sho; Togo (0:18)
Bushi Titán	Bushi; Titán (14:40)	Austin; Bey (13:27)	Bushi; Titán (11:11)	Bushi; Titán (10:02)	Zayne; Lindaman (9:28)	Bushi; Titán (7:57)	Bushi; Titán (11:41)	Bushi; Titán (11:56)	—N/a	Yoh; Rush (12:17)
Rush Yoh	TJP; Akira (19:06)	Rush; Yoh (15:01)	Rush; Yoh (10:13)	Rush; Yoh (11:28)	Rush; Yoh (12:21)	Rush; Yoh (10:43)	Rush; Yoh (10:04)	Sho; Togo (0:18)	Rush; Yoh (12:17)	—N/a

Final
1	Ace Austin and Chris Bey	21:10
2	Lio Rush and Yoh	Pin

=== 2023 ===
The 2023 Super Jr. Tag League was a sixteen-night professional wrestling tournament hosted by New Japan Pro-Wrestling. It featured ten teams in a single block, with the team having the most points at the end of the league winning the entire tournament. In case of a tie between two or more top-ranked teams in the block in terms of points, tiebreakers were held and the winner of the tournament would be decided. Block matches were held from October 21 to November 4, 2023, and the final took place at the 2023 edition of Power Struggle.

Standings
TJP and Francesco Akira	12
Sho and Yoshinobu Kanemaru	12
El Desperado and Master Wato	12
Clark Connors and Drilla Moloney	10
Bushi and Titán	10
Kushida and Kevin Knight	10
Robbie Eagles and Kosei Fujita	8
Yoh and Musashi	8
Douki and Taka Michinoku	4
Ryusuke Taguchi and The DKC	4

Results	Yoh Musashi	Kushida Knight	Taguchi The DKC	Desperado Wato	Douki Michinoku	Bushi Titán	Eagles Fujita	TJP Akira	Connors Moloney	Sho Kanemaru
Yoh Musashi	—N/a	Kushida; Knight (10:02)	Yoh; Musashi (11:16)	Yoh; Musashi (12:07)	Douki; Michinoku (11:13)	Yoh; Musashi (10:11)	Eagles; Fujita (12:11)	Yoh; Musashi (14:03)	Connors; Moloney (12:21)	Sho; Kanemaru (10:28)
Kushida Knight	Kushida; Knight (10:02)	—N/a	Kushida; Knight (12:13)	Desperado; Wato (24:54)	Kushida; Knight (10:15)	Bushi; Titan (10:43)	Kushida; Knight (10:50)	TJP; Akira (10:35)	Kushida; Knight (12:50)	Sho; Kanemaru (10:43)
Taguchi The DKC	Yoh; Musashi (11:16)	Kushida; Knight (12:13)	—N/a	Desperado; Wato (10:47)	Douki; Michinoku (9:30)	Taguchi; The DKC (8:26)	Taguchi; The DKC (12:01)	TJP; Akira (12:39)	Connors; Moloney (10:33)	Sho; Kanemaru (11:15)
Desperado Wato	Yoh; Musashi (12:07)	Desperado; Wato (24:54)	Desperado; Wato (10:47)	—N/a	Desperado; Wato (13:20)	Desperado; Wato (17:53)	Desperado; Wato (16:37)	TJP; Akira (21:47)	Desperado; Wato (17:51)	Sho; Kanemaru (19:20)
Douki Michinoku	Douki; Michinoku (11:13)	Kushida; Knight (10:15)	Douki; Michinoku (9:30)	Desperado; Wato (13:20)	—N/a	Bushi; Titan (12:03)	Eagles; Fujita (11:02)	TJP; Akira (10:31)	Connors; Moloney (8:45)	Sho; Kanemaru (12:26)
Bushi Titán	Yoh; Musashi (10:11)	Bushi; Titan (10:43)	Taguchi; The DKC (8:26)	Desperado; Wato (17:53)	Bushi; Titan (12:03)	—N/a	Bushi; Titan (12:30)	Bushi; Titan (13:30)	Connors; Moloney (11:01)	Bushi; Titan (13:54)
Eagles Fujita	Eagles; Fujita (12:11)	Kushida; Knight (10:50)	Taguchi; The DKC (12:01)	Desperado; Wato (16:37)	Eagles; Fujita (11:02)	Bushi; Titan (12:30)	—N/a	TJP; Akira (11:50)	Eagles; Fujita (3:33)	Eagles; Fujita (11:27)
TJP Akira	Yoh; Musashi (14:03)	TJP; Akira (10:35)	TJP; Akira (12:39)	TJP; Akira (21:47)	TJP; Akira (10:31)	Bushi; Titan (13:30)	TJP; Akira (11:50)	—N/a	Connors; Moloney (16:15)	TJP; Akira (18:56)
Connors Moloney	Connors; Moloney (12:21)	Kushida; Knight (12:50)	Connors; Moloney (10:33)	Desperado; Wato (17:51)	Connors; Moloney (8:45)	Connors; Moloney (11:01)	Eagles; Fujita (3:33)	Connors; Moloney (16:15)	—N/a	Sho; Kanemaru (13:24)
Sho Kanemaru	Sho; Kanemaru (10:28)	Sho; Kanemaru (10:43)	Sho; Kanemaru (11:15)	Sho; Kanemaru (19:20)	Sho; Kanemaru (12:26)	Bushi; Titan (13:54)	Eagles; Fujita (11:27)	TJP; Akira (18:56)	Sho; Kanemaru (13:24)	—N/a

Final
1	Sho and Yoshinobu Kanemaru	16:40
2	TJP and Francesco Akira	Pin

=== 2024 ===
The 2024 Super Jr. Tag League was a nine-night professional wrestling tournament hosted by New Japan Pro-Wrestling. It featured twelve teams divided across two blocks – the first time this format has been used since the tournament switched to a round-robin tournament – with the top two teams facing in the finals. Guest wrestlers included Dragon Dia from Dragongate, Ninja Mack from Pro Wrestling Noah, and Capitán Suicida from CMLL. In case of a tie between two or more top-ranked teams in the block in terms of points, tiebreakers were held and the winner of the tournament would be decided. Block matches were held from October 24 to November 2, 2024 and the final took place at the 2024 edition of Power Struggle.

Standings
Block A		Block B	
Robbie Eagles and Kosei Fujita	8	Francesco Akira and TJP	6
Clark Connors and Drilla Moloney	6	Kushida and Kevin Knight	6
Sho and Yoshinobu Kanemaru	6	Taiji Ishimori and Robbie X	6
Ryusuke Taguchi and Dragon Dia	4	The DKC and Ninja Mack	4
Bushi and Hiromu Takahashi	4	Yoh and Rocky Romero	4
Tiger Mask and Capitán Suicida	2	Paris De Silva and Jude London	4

Block A	Connors Moloney	Sho Kanemaru	Eagles Fujita	Bushi Hiromu	Taguchi Dia	Tiger Suicida
Connors Moloney	—	Connors; Moloney (11:40)	Connors; Moloney (21:46)	Bushi; Hiromu (14:55)	Taguchi; Dia (18:53)	Connors; Moloney (8:58)
Sho Kanemaru	Connors; Moloney (11:40)	—	Eagles; Fujita (16:17)	Sho; Kanemaru (12:51)	Sho; Kanemaru (10:08)	Sho; Kanemaru (9:50)
Eagles Fujita	Connors; Moloney (21:46)	Eagles; Fujita (16:17)	—	Eagles; Fujita (18:17)	Eagles; Fujita (15:40)	Eagles; Fujita (11:15)
Bushi Hiromu	Bushi; Hiromu (14:55)	Sho; Kanemaru (12:51)	Eagles; Fujita (18:17)	—	Taguchi; Dia (8:35)	Bushi; Hiromu (11:22)
Taguchi Dia	Taguchi; Dia (18:53)	Sho; Kanemaru (10:08)	Eagles; Fujita (15:40)	Taguchi; Dia (8:35)	—	Mask; Suicida (9:28)
Tiger Suicida	Connors; Moloney (8:58)	Sho; Kanemaru (9:50)	Eagles; Fujita (11:15)	Bushi; Hiromu (11:22)	Tiger; Suicida (9:28)	—
Block B	Kushida Knight	Akira TJP	Yoh Romero	DKC Mack	Ishimori Robbie	De Silva London
Kushida Knight	—	TJP; Akira (15:26)	Kushida; Knight (17:06)	Kushida; Knight (9:50)	Kushida; Knight (8:57)	De Silva; London (10:52)
Akira TJP	TJP; Akira (15:26)	—	Yoh; Romero (24:37)	TJP; Akira (15:03)	TJP; Akira (16:02)	De Silva; London (12:55)
Yoh Romero	Kushida; Knight (17:06)	Yoh; Romero (24:37)	—	DKC; Mack (15:52)	Ishimori; Robbie (16:47)	Yoh; Romero (10:30)
DKC Mack	Kushida; Knight (9:50)	TJP; Akira (15:03)	DKC; Mack (15:52)	—	Ishimori; Robbie (14:20)	DKC; Mack (11:07)
Ishimori Robbie	Kushida; Knight (8:57)	TJP; Akira (16:02)	Ishimori; Robbie (16:47)	Ishimori; Robbie (14:20)	—	Ishimori; Robbie (9:06)
De Silva London	De Silva; London (10:52)	De Silva; London (12:55)	Yoh; Romero (10:30)	DKC; Mack (11:07)	Ishimori; Robbie (9:06)	—

Final
A	Robbie Eagles and Kosei Fujita	Pin
B	Francesco Akira and TJP	15:20

=== 2025 ===
The 2025 Super Jr. Tag League was a nine-night professional wrestling tournament hosted by New Japan Pro-Wrestling. It featured twelve teams divided across two blocks, with the top two teams facing off in the finals. Guest wrestlers included Dragon Dia, Yuki Yoshioka and Yamato from Dragongate, and freelancer Kuukai. In case of a tie between two or more top-ranked teams in the block in terms of points, tiebreakers were held, and the winner of the tournament would be decided. Block matches were being held from October 23 to November 1, 2025, with the final taking place at Hiroshi Tanahashi Final Homecoming on November 2, 2025.

Standings
Block A		Block B	
Sho and Douki	10	Taiji Ishimori and Robbie X	8
Master Wato and Yoh	8	Robbie Eagles and Kosei Fujita	8
Ryusuke Taguchi and Dragon Dia	6	Kushida and Yuki Yoshioka	6
Templario and Jakob Austin Young	4	El Desperado and Kuukai	2
Hiromu Takahashi and Gedo	2	Dick Togo and Yoshinobu Kanemaru	2
Clark Connors and Daiki Nagai	0	Tiger Mask and Yamato	2

Block A	Taguchi Dia	Wato Yoh	Hiromu Gedo	Connors Nagai	Templario Young	Sho Douki
Taguchi Dia	—	Wato; Yoh (17:08)	Taguchi; Dia (14:06)	Taguchi; Dia (15:28)	Taguchi; Dia (9:56)	Sho; Douki (19:12)
Wato Yoh	Wato; Yoh (17:08)	—	Wato; Yoh (16:26)	Wato; Yoh (9:47)	Wato; Yoh (13:27)	Sho; Douki (17:00)
Hiromu Gedo	Taguchi; Dia (14:06)	Wato; Yoh (16:26)	—	Hiromu; Gedo (8:25)	Templario; Young (11:32)	Douki; Sho (13:57)
Connors Nagai	Taguchi; Dia (15:28)	Wato; Yoh (9:47)	Hiromu; Gedo (8:25)	—	Templario; Young (10:46)	Sho; Douki (14:01)
Templario Young	Taguchi; Dia (9:56)	Wato; Yoh (13:27)	Templario; Young (11:32)	Templario; Young (10:46)	—	Douki; Sho (11:51)
Sho Douki	Sho; Douki (19:12)	Sho; Douki (17:00)	Sho; Douki (13:57)	Sho; Douki (14:01)	Sho; Douki (11:51)	—
Block B	Desperado Kuukai	Tiger Yamato	Kushida Yoshioka	Eagles Fujita	Ishimori Robbie	Kanemaru Togo
Desperado Kuukai	—	Desperado; Kuukai (11:34)	Desperado; Kuukai (16:34)	Eagles; Fujita (19:44)	Ishimori; Robbie (14:02)	Kanemaru; Togo (13:21)
Tiger Yamato	Desperado; Kuukai (11:34)	—	Kushida; Yoshioka (13:24)	Eagles; Fujita (13:15)	Ishimori; Robbie (11:32)	Tiger; Yamato (12:36)
Kushida Yoshioka	Desperado; Kuukai (16:34)	Kushida; Yoshioka (13:24)	—	Eagles; Fujita (21:30)	Kushida; Yoshioka (Forfeit)	Kushida; Yoshioka (14:37)
Eagles Fujita	Eagles; Fujita (19:44)	Eagles; Fujita (13:15)	Eagles; Fujita (21:30)	—	Ishimori; Robbie (19:21)	Eagles; Fujita (11:52)
Ishimori Robbie	Ishimori; Robbie (14:02)	Ishimori; Robbie (11:32)	Kushida; Yoshioka (Forfeit)	Ishimori; Robbie (19:21)	—	Ishimori; Robbie (10:13)
Kanemaru Togo	Kanemaru; Togo (13:21)	Tiger; Yamato (12:36)	Kushida; Yoshioka (14:37)	Eagles; Fujita (11:52)	Ishimori; Robbie (10:13)	—

Final
A	House of Torture (Sho and Douki)	Pin
B	Bullet Club (Taiji Ishimori and Robbie X)	15:16

=== 2026 ===
The 2026 Super Jr. Tag League was an eight-night professional wrestling tournament hosted by New Japan Pro-Wrestling. It featured twelve teams divided across two blocks, with the top two teams facing off in the finals. Block matches were held from October 24 to November 1, 2026, with the final taking place at Power Struggle on November 3, 2026. Originally, El Desperado was set to compete with Místico, but he suffered an injury before the tournament and was substituted by Masatora Yasuda.

Final Standings
Block A		Block B	
Taiji Ishimori and Robbie X	8	Robbie Eagles and Kosei Fujita	8
Douki and Yoshinobu Kanemaru	8	Blake Christian and Lee Johnson	8
Ryusuke Taguchi and Kazuma Sumi	6	Yoh and Hyo	6
Kushida and Nick Wayne	4	Francesco Akira and Jakob Austin Young	4
Master Wato and Kuukai	2	Sho and Dick Togo	2
Místico and Masatora Yasuda	2	Titán and Daiki Nagai	2

Block A	Yasuda Místico	Taguchi Sumi	Wato Kuukai	Kushida Wayne	Ishimori Robbie	Douki Kanemaru
Yasuda Místico	—	Taguchi; Sumi (11:00)	Wato; Kuukai (13:32)	Kushida; Wayne (11:18)	Yasuda; Místico (14:41)	Douki; Kanemaru (10:22)
Taguchi Sumi	Taguchi; Sumi (11:00)	—	Taguchi; Sumi (11:51)	Taguchi; Sumi (17:05)	Ishimori; Robbie (12:50)	Douki; Kanemaru (12:27)
Wato Kuukai	Wato; Kuukai (13:32)	Taguchi; Sumi (11:51)	—	Kushida; Wayne (8:28)	Ishimori; Robbie (13:38)	Douki; Kanemaru (14:18)
Kushida Wayne	Kushida; Wayne (11:18)	Taguchi; Sumi (17:05)	Kushida; Wayne (8:28)	—	Ishimori; Robbie (13:40)	Douki; Kanemaru (9:36)
Ishimori Robbie	Yasuda; Místico (14:41)	Ishimori; Robbie (12:50)	Ishimori; Robbie (13:38)	Ishimori; Robbie (13:40)	—	Ishimori; Robbie (12:50)
Douki Kanemaru	Douki; Kanemaru (10:22)	Douki; Kanemaru (12:27)	Douki; Kanemaru (14:18)	Douki; Kanemaru (9:36)	Ishimori; Robbie (12:50)	—
Block B	Yoh Hyo	Titán Nagai	Eagles Fujita	Akira Young	Christian Johnson	Sho Togo
Yoh Hyo	—	Yoh; Hyo (11:53)	Eagles; Fujita (17:14)	Yoh; Hyo (10:34)	Christian; Johnson (12:06)	Yoh; Hyo (12:04)
Titán Nagai	Yoh; Hyo (11:53)	—	Eagles; Fujita (10:32)	Akira; Young (11:50)	Christian; Johnson (10:58)	Titán; Nagai (11:43)
Eagles Fujita	Eagles; Fujita (17:14)	Eagles; Fujita (10:32)	—	Eagles; Fujita (16:17)	Eagles; Fujita (21:21)	Sho; Togo (15:45)
Akira Young	Yoh; Hyo (10:34)	Akira; Young (11:50)	Eagles; Fujita (16:17)	—	Christian; Johnson (13:02)	Akira; Young (10:35)
Christian Johnson	Christian; Johnson (12:06)	Christian; Johnson (10:58)	Eagles; Fujita (21:21)	Christian; Johnson (13:02)	—	Christian; Johnson (11:43)
Sho Togo	Yoh; Hyo (12:04)	Titán; Nagai (11:43)	Sho; Togo (15:45)	Akira; Young (10:35)	Christian; Johnson (11:43)	—

Final
A	Unbound Co. (Taiji Ishimori and Robbie X)	Pin
B	Ichihan Sweet Boys (Robbie Eagles and Kosei Fujita)	11:08

== See also ==
- AJPW Junior Tag League
- Nippon TV Cup Jr. Heavyweight Tag League
