= World junior heavyweight championship =

World junior heavyweight championship may refer to:

- World Junior Heavyweight Championship (AJPW)
- World Junior Heavyweight Championship (National Wrestling Association)
- CZW World Junior Heavyweight Championship
- Independent Junior Heavyweight Championship
- IWA World Junior Heavyweight Championship
- NWA World Junior Heavyweight Championship
- NWA World Junior Heavyweight Championship (Zero1)
- UWA World Junior Heavyweight Championship
- WWC World Junior Heavyweight Championship
