= The New Beginning in Sapporo (2017) =

2017 New Japan Pro-Wrestling event

- Promotional poster for the event, featuring various NJPW wrestlers
- Promotion: New Japan Pro-Wrestling
- Date: February 5, 2017
- City: Sapporo, Hokkaido, Japan
- Venue: Hokkaido Prefectural Sports Center
- Attendance: 5,545

Event chronology
← Previous; Road to the New Beginning	Next → Road to the New Beginning

The New Beginning chronology
← Previous; Niigata	Next → Osaka 2017

The New Beginning in Sapporo (2017) was a professional wrestling event promoted by New Japan Pro-Wrestling (NJPW). The event took place on February 5, 2017, in Sapporo, Hokkaido, at the Hokkaido Prefectural Sports Center. The event featured nine matches, four of which were contested for championships. In the main event, Kazuchika Okada successfully defended the IWGP Heavyweight Championship against Minoru Suzuki. This was the eleventh event under the New Beginning name and the first to take place in Sapporo.

== Production ==
=== Background ===
In recent years, NJPW has held the opening day of the G1 Climax tournament in Sapporo. With The New Beginning in Sapporo, the promotion revived an old tradition of holding a show during the annual Sapporo Snow Festival, resulting in the show being promoted under the subtitle Fukkatsu! Yuki no Sapporo Kessen (復活！雪の札幌決戦, "Revival! Sapporo Showdown in Snow"). The event aired worldwide on NJPW's internet streaming site, NJPW World, with English commentary provided by Kevin Kelly and Don Callis, the latter of whom replaced Kelly's previous broadcast partner Steve Corino.

=== Storylines ===
The New Beginning in Sapporo featured nine professional wrestling matches that involved different wrestlers from pre-existing scripted feuds and storylines. Wrestlers portrayed villains, heroes, or less distinguishable characters in the scripted events that built tension and culminated in a wrestling match or series of matches.

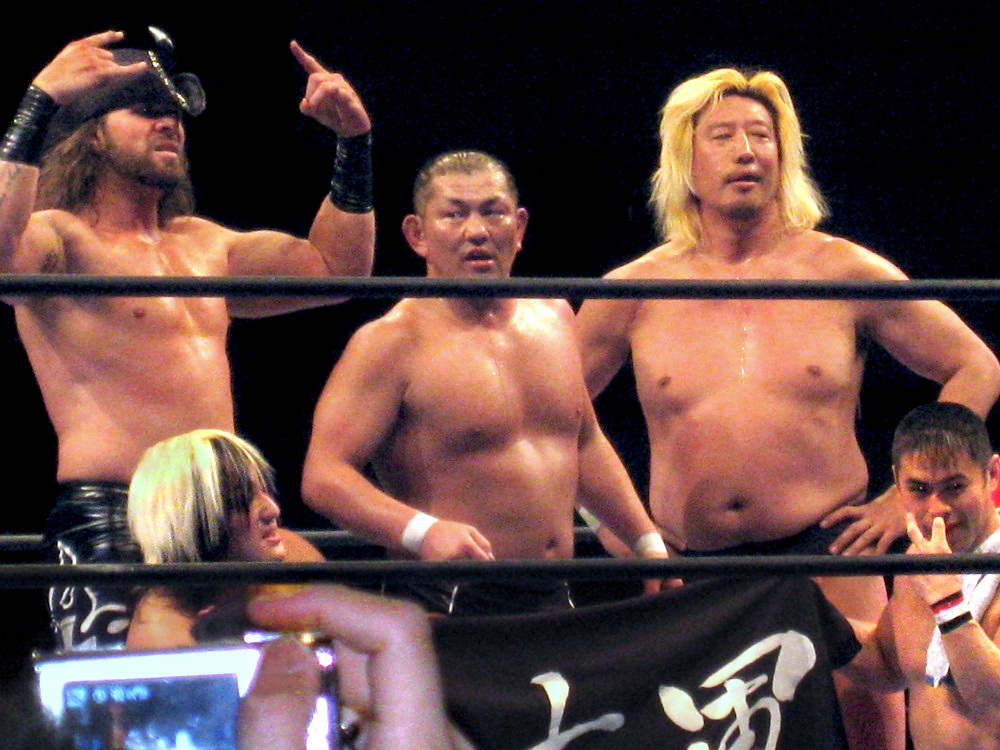
Minoru Suzuki (center), who challenged for the IWGP Heavyweight Championship in the main event and whose Suzuki-gun stable played a major part in the rest of the show

The New Beginning in Sapporo was main evented by Kazuchika Okada making his third defense of the IWGP Heavyweight Championship against Minoru Suzuki. After spending two years away in Pro Wrestling Noah, Minoru Suzuki, along with his Suzuki-gun stable, returned to NJPW on January 5, 2017, attacking Okada and his Chaos stable with Suzuki laying out Okada with his finishing maneuver, the Gotch-Style Piledriver. Suzuki then declared war on all of NJPW, stating that his stable would take over all of the promotion's championships, just like they had done in Noah. Okada, however, promised to show Suzuki how far NJPW had come during the two years that Suzuki-gun had been away. The main event was officially announced on January 10. In interviews prior to the match, it was claimed that the bad blood between the two started on May 13, 2007, when Suzuki confronted then 19-year old Okada at an event promoted by Último Dragón. The two have since wrestled three singles matches against each other with Okada having won two and Suzuki one. In the days leading to the event, Suzuki targeted Okada's right knee with one attack taking place at a contract signing the day before the event.

The Suzuki-gun return angle resulted in The New Beginning in Sapporo also featuring other prominent matches featuring the stable. On January 4, 2017, at Wrestle Kingdom 11 in Tokyo Dome, Tomohiro Ishii and Toru Yano forced their way into the IWGP Tag Team Championship match, originally scheduled between champions Guerrillas of Destiny (Tama Tonga and Tanga Loa) and challengers Great Bash Heel (Togi Makabe and Tomoaki Honma), and then proceeded to win the match to become the new champions. G.B.H., who were not involved in the pinfall that decided the match, remained in position to challenge for the title. The following day, both Chaos' Ishii and Yano as well as G.B.H. were part of the group of wrestlers attacked by the returning Suzuki-gun stable. During the attack, Suzuki-gun's designated heavyweight tag team Killer Elite Squad (Davey Boy Smith Jr. and Lance Archer) targeted Ishii and Yano, and afterwards declared themselves the true IWGP Tag Team Championship, stating that they would regain the title in their first attempt. On January 10, NJPW announced a three-way match between Chaos and Yano, G.B.H. and K.E.S. for The New Beginning in Sapporo. The same three teams were scheduled to face off in another three-way title match six days later at The New Beginning in Osaka. The Sapporo event would also feature a third title match involving members of the returning Suzuki-gun stable with Taichi and Taka Michinoku challenging Chaos' Roppongi Vice (Beretta and Rocky Romero) for the IWGP Junior Heavyweight Tag Team Championship. This also stemmed from the January 5 attack, during which the challengers had targeted the champions. Taichi and Michinoku previously held the title in November 2013.

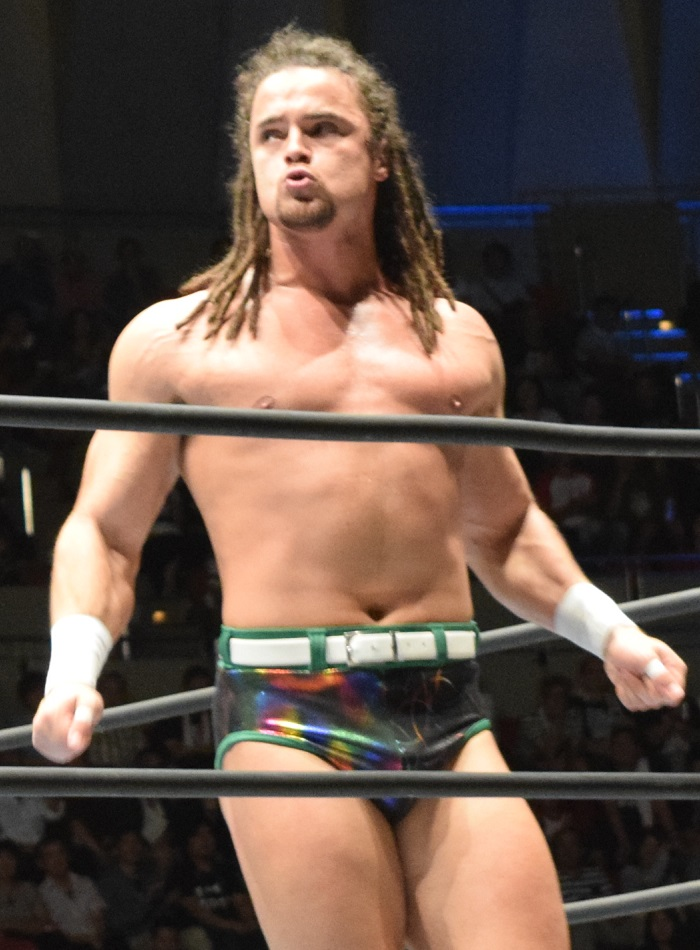
Juice Robinson, who challenged for the NEVER Openweight Championship at the event

The NEVER Openweight Championship would also be defended at The New Beginning in Sapporo with champion Hirooki Goto taking on challenger Juice Robinson in his first defense. Goto captured the title at Wrestle Kingdom 11 in Tokyo Dome on January 4, but was pinned by Robinson in a ten-man tag team match the following day, leading to NJPW announcing the title match on January 10.

The event would also include a ten-man tag team match, where the Los Ingobernables de Japón stable of Bushi, Evil, Hiromu Takahashi, Sanada and Tetsuya Naito were set to take on Dragon Lee, Hiroshi Tanahashi, Manabu Nakanishi, Michael Elgin and Ryusuke Taguchi. This match built to title matches taking place six days later at The New Beginning in Osaka, where Naito would defend the IWGP Intercontinental Championship against Elgin and Takahashi would defend the IWGP Junior Heavyweight Championship against Lee, while Tanahashi, Nakanishi and Taguchi defend the NEVER Openweight 6-Man Tag Team Championship against Bushi, Evil and Sanada.

The undercard would feature two more matches involving Suzuki-gun with Takashi Iizuka taking on Chaos' Yoshi-Hashi, while El Desperado and Yoshinobu Kanemaru take on Hirai Kawato and Kushida. The New Beginning in Sapporo was noteworthy for Kenny Omega and the entire Bullet Club stable being absent from the event.

== Reception ==
Dave Meltzer of the Wrestling Observer Newsletter gave the main event four and three quarter stars out of five, making a case for Suzuki to be added to the Wrestling Observer Newsletter Hall of Fame. Comparing it to Okada's previous month's match against Kenny Omega, Meltzer wrote that while the Omega match "set standards for drama, stamina and durability", the Suzuki match was "more likely to be used in wrestling schools as an example of babyface selling, psychology, comebacks, and taking a match to a point where it comes across no longer as entertainment but as close to dramatic sport as could be possible in the genre without going full bore shoot style".

== Results ==
No.	Results	Stipulations	Times
1	Suzuki-gun (El Desperado and Yoshinobu Kanemaru) defeated Hirai Kawato and Kushida	Tag team match	07:34
2	Hiroyoshi Tenzan, Satoshi Kojima and Yuji Nagata defeated Henare, Tomoyuki Oka and Yoshitatsu	Six-man tag team match	07:48
3	Chaos (Gedo, Jado and Will Ospreay) defeated Jyushin Thunder Liger, Katsuyori Shibata and Tiger Mask	Six-man tag team match	06:47
4	Yoshi-Hashi defeated Takashi Iizuka (with El Desperado)	Singles match	07:00
5	Taguchi Japan (Dragon Lee, Hiroshi Tanahashi, Manabu Nakanishi, Michael Elgin and Ryusuke Taguchi) defeated Los Ingobernables de Japón (Bushi, Evil, Hiromu Takahashi, Sanada and Tetsuya Naito)	Ten-man tag team match	13:03
6	Roppongi Vice (Beretta and Rocky Romero) (c) defeated Suzuki-gun (Taichi and Taka Michinoku) (with El Desperado, Miho Abe and Yoshinobu Kanemaru)	Tag team match for the IWGP Junior Heavyweight Tag Team Championship	13:37
7	Hirooki Goto (c) defeated Juice Robinson	Singles match for the NEVER Openweight Championship	14:41
8	Chaos (Tomohiro Ishii and Toru Yano) (c) defeated G.B.H. (Togi Makabe and Tomoaki Honma) and K.E.S. (Davey Boy Smith Jr. and Lance Archer)	Three-way tag team match for the IWGP Tag Team Championship	13:35
9	Kazuchika Okada (c) (with Gedo) defeated Minoru Suzuki (with Taichi)	Singles match for the IWGP Heavyweight Championship	40:46
(c) / – the champion(s) heading into the match
