= Suzuki-gun =

Professional wrestling stable

- The logo of Suzuki-gun

Stable
- Name(s): Kojima-gun; Suzuki-gun
- Members: See below
- Debut: January 28, 2011 (as Kojima-gun); May 3, 2011 (as Suzuki-gun)
- Disbanded: December 23, 2022
- Years active: 2011–2022

Suzuki-gun (鈴木軍, Suzukigun; literally translated to "Suzuki Army") was a villainous professional wrestling stable primarily appearing in the New Japan Pro-Wrestling (NJPW) promotion, and making occasional appearances in All Elite Wrestling (AEW). The group was founded in December 2010 by IWGP Heavyweight Champion Satoshi Kojima as Kojima-gun (小島軍, Kojimagun; "Kojima Army"), but the members of the stable turned on Kojima and appointed Minoru Suzuki as their new leader in May 2011. Suzuki-gun added several new members, such as Davey Boy Smith Jr. and Lance Archer, known collectively as the Killer Elite Squad (K.E.S.), who are three-time IWGP Tag Team Champions and two-time NWA World Tag Team Champions as part of the stable. Other accomplishments attained by the stable include Suzuki and Archer winning the 2011 G1 Tag League and founding members Taichi and Taka Michinoku becoming one-time IWGP Junior Heavyweight Tag Team Champions. As the leader of Suzuki-gun, Suzuki became one of NJPW's top wrestlers and has challenged for the IWGP Heavyweight Championship on multiple occasions.

In January 2015, Suzuki-gun, through a partnership between NJPW and Pro Wrestling Noah, took part in a storyline, where the stable invaded Noah, making it their primary promotion. Within two months, Suzuki-gun had captured all four of Noah's championships with Suzuki becoming the GHC Heavyweight Champion, K.E.S. the GHC Tag Team Champions, Taichi the GHC Junior Heavyweight Champion and El Desperado and Michinoku the GHC Junior Heavyweight Tag Team Champions. Suzuki-gun dominated Noah for the rest of 2015 until losing all but the GHC Tag Team Championship at the end of the year. The invasion storyline continued in 2016 with Suzuki-gun adding two new members; Noah originals Takashi Sugiura and Yoshinobu Kanemaru, who quickly brought the GHC Heavyweight and Junior Heavyweight Championships back to the stable. The invasion storyline concluded in December 2016, resulting in the stable's return to NJPW in January 2017.

Since their return to New Japan, the stable saw much success, adding Zack Sabre Jr., who brought the British Heavyweight Championship to the group and won the New Japan Cup tournament twice in 2018 and 2022. Sabre Jr and now heavyweight Taichi teamed as Dangerous Tekkers, winning the IWGP Heavyweight Tag Team Championships on three occasions. Lance Archer captured the IWGP United States Heavyweight Championship twice. El Desperado and Yoshinobu Kanemaru also saw much success in the junior heavyweight division, winning the IWGP Junior Heavyweight Tag Team Championships four times and Desperado winning the IWGP Junior Heavyweight Championship two times, including holding both junior titles simultaneously. In September 2021, Suzuki debuted for NJPW's American partner promotion All Elite Wrestling (AEW), and realigned himself with Lance Archer, bringing him back into the stable after he previously departed both it and NJPW in 2020. In AEW's sister promotion Ring of Honor (ROH), Suzuki won his first American Championship, the ROH Television Championship. In 2022 at the World Tag League finals, Suzuki announced that Suzuki-Gun would disband at the end of 2022. The stable's final match, an eight-man tag-team match, between the members took place on December 23, 2022.

== History ==
=== Kojima-gun (2010–2011) ===
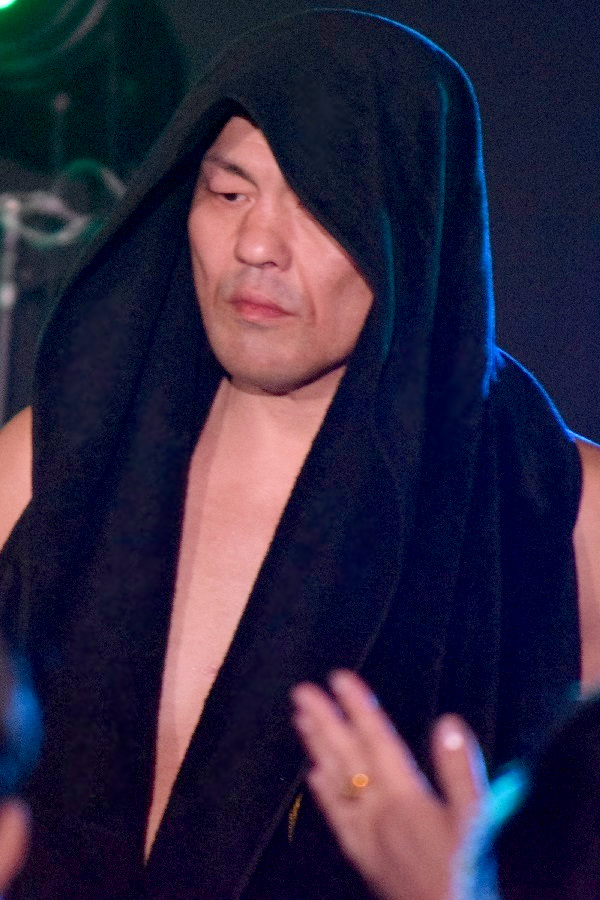
Minoru Suzuki, the leader of Suzuki-gun

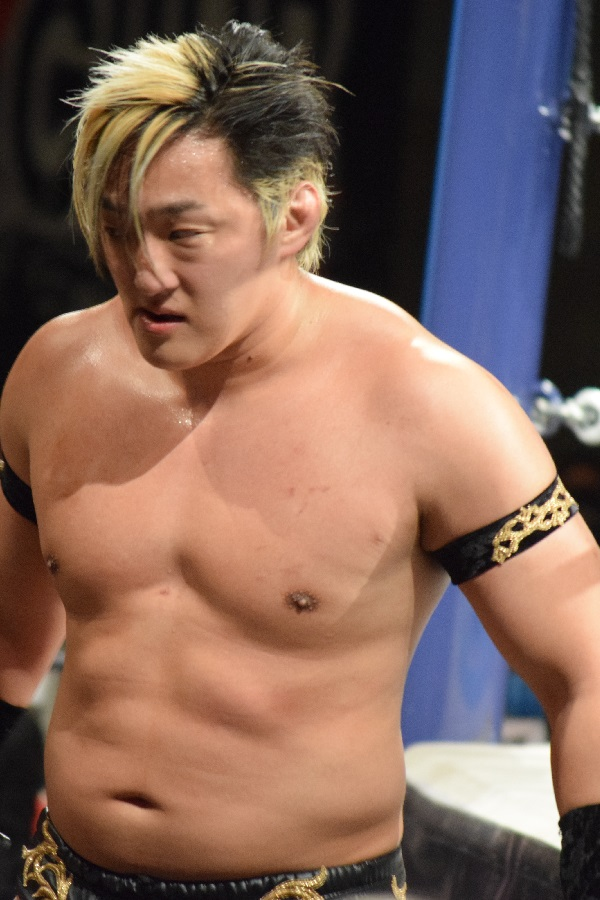
Taichi, founding member of both Kojima-gun and Suzuki-gun

On December 12, 2010, Taichi returned to New Japan Pro-Wrestling (NJPW) from his latest excursion to Mexican promotion Consejo Mundial de Lucha Libre (CMLL), accompanying IWGP Heavyweight Champion Satoshi Kojima to a match, where he successfully defended his title against Shinsuke Nakamura. Kojima continued teaming with Taichi during the following week's events, and on December 23, the two were also joined by freelancer Nosawa Rongai and Kaientai Dojo's Taka Michinoku. On January 28, 2011, Kojima officially named the group "Kojima-gun". On February 20 at The New Beginning, the debuting MVP became the fifth member of Kojima-gun, in storyline being brought to the group by Nosawa using his American connections. However, prior to MVP's debut, Nosawa took a hiatus from professional wrestling altogether, after being arrested under suspicion of stealing a taxi.

=== Suzuki-gun ===
==== Formation and early feuds (2011–2013) ====
After losing the IWGP Heavyweight Championship to Hiroshi Tanahashi at Wrestle Kingdom V in Tokyo Dome, Kojima suffered another big loss against longtime rival Togi Makabe on May 3 at Wrestling Dontaku 2011. Following the match, Michinoku and Taichi entered the ring and attacked Kojima, who, however, quickly took care of both of them. This led to the surprise return of freelancer Minoru Suzuki, who appeared behind Kojima and locked him in a sleeper hold, before leaving the ringside area with Michinoku and Taichi, who proclaimed Suzuki as their new leader and renamed the stable "Suzuki-gun". On May 15, during the Invasion Tour 2011, NJPW's first tour of the United States, Lance Archer made his debut for the promotion, attacking Kojima after a match, before being chased away by former Kojima-gun member MVP. The following day, Archer was officially named a member of Suzuki-gun. During the following months, Suzuki continued his feud with Kojima, while Archer went up against Togi Makabe and Michinoku and Taichi became a tag team in NJPW's junior heavyweight tag team division. Suzuki's feud with Kojima culminated on July 18 in a grudge match, where Suzuki was victorious, after which he transitioned to feuding with Togi Makabe.

From late October to early November, Suzuki and Archer represented Suzuki-gun in the 2011 G1 Tag League, where they finished second in their round-robin block with four wins and one loss, advancing to the semifinals. On November 6, Suzuki and Archer first defeated Chaos representatives Shinsuke Nakamura and Toru Yano in the semifinals and then the reigning IWGP Tag Team Champions, Bad Intentions (Giant Bernard and Karl Anderson), in the final to win the 2011 G1 Tag League. As a result, Suzuki and Archer were granted a match for the IWGP Tag Team Championship, but were defeated by Bad Intentions in a rematch on November 12 at Power Struggle. During the same event, fellow Suzuki-gun member Taka Michinoku failed in his attempt to take the IWGP Junior Heavyweight Championship from Prince Devitt. Power Struggle was also the start of a relationship between Suzuki-gun and Suzuki's close friend, Pro Wrestling Noah representative Yoshihiro Takayama, who began making semi-regular NJPW appearances as a member of the stable. On January 4, 2012, at Wrestle Kingdom VI in Tokyo Dome, Suzuki received his first shot at the IWGP Heavyweight Championship in seven years, but was defeated by Hiroshi Tanahashi in the main event of the evening. During Suzuki's chase for the IWGP Heavyweight Championship, Takayama momentarily took over his feud with Togi Makabe, but their rivalry also ended at Wrestle Kingdom VI in Tokyo Dome in a match, where Makabe was victorious.

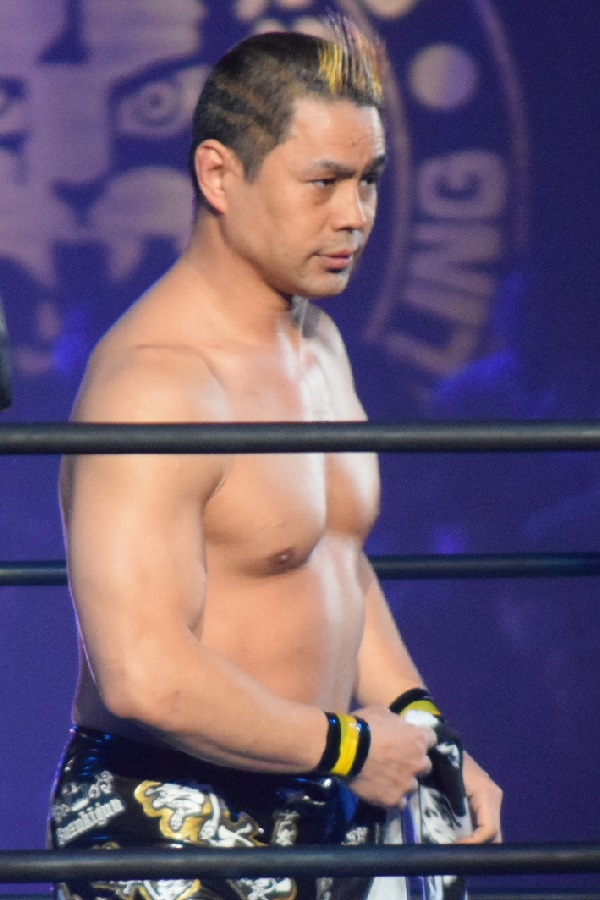
Taka Michinoku, the other founding member of both Kojima-gun and Suzuki-gun

On February 12 at The New Beginning, the five members of Suzuki-gun took a dominant 5–1 win over Kushida, Tiger Mask, Togi Makabe, Wataru Inoue and Yuji Nagata in a ten-man elimination tag team match, after which Archer and Takayama challenged Tencozy (Hiroyoshi Tenzan and Satoshi Kojima) to a match for the IWGP Tag Team Championship. On February 19 at All Together, a charity event co-produced by NJPW, All Japan Pro Wrestling (AJPW) and Pro Wrestling Noah, AJPW's Masayuki Kono made a one-time appearance representing Suzuki-gun. Archer and Takayama received their title shot on March 18, but were unable to dethrone the defending champions. On April 15, the recently debuted Black Tiger won the 2012 Road to the Super Jr. 2Days Tournament to earn a spot in the 2012 Best of the Super Juniors tournament. After his win, Michinoku and Taichi welcomed Black Tiger to Suzuki-gun, while also hinting that the man under the mask was a former associate of Minoru Suzuki. On May 23, Kazushige Nosawa, a former member of Kojima-gun and Suzuki's prior stable Suzuki Gundan, was arrested under suspicion of smuggling marijuana from Mexico to Japan. Though all charges against Nosawa were later dropped, NJPW immediately acknowledged that he had been portraying the latest Black Tiger and severed their ties with him. Meanwhile, Michinoku and Taichi had set their sights on the IWGP Junior Heavyweight Tag Team Championship, but were, on June 16 at Dominion 6.16, defeated by Jyushin Thunder Liger and Tiger Mask in a match for the vacant title. On July 22, Suzuki, Archer, Michinoku and Taichi picked up another dominant win over Prince Devitt, Ryusuke Taguchi, Togi Makabe and Yuji Nagata in an eight-man elimination tag team match, after which Archer again challenged Tenzan and Kojima to a match for the IWGP Tag Team Championship, however, without specifying who his partner would be.

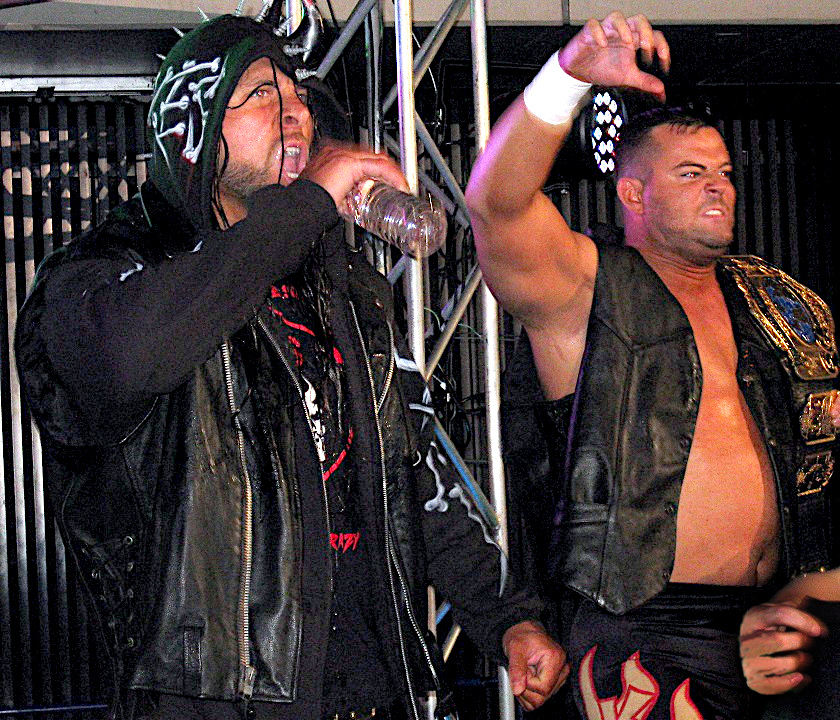
(Left to right) Lance Archer and Davey Boy Smith Jr., who formed the Killer Elite Squad as part of Suzuki-gun, pictured as the NWA World Tag Team Champions in June 2013

On August 13, Harry Smith was revealed as Archer's partner and the newest member of Suzuki-gun. Also in August, Michinoku and Taichi began blaming each other for their recent losses, which led to the two agreeing to a match, where the loser would be expelled from Suzuki-gun. The match took place on August 22 at Michinoku's Kaientai Dojo promotion, but ended without a winner as Minoru Suzuki interrupted the match and got the two men to make peace with each other. Harry Smith made his debut as a member of Suzuki-gun on September 7 in an eight-man tag team match, where he, Lance Archer, Minoru Suzuki and Taka Michinoku were defeated by Hiroyoshi Tenzan, Satoshi Kojima, Togi Makabe and Yuji Nagata via disqualification, when Michinoku's Kaientai Dojo trainee Kengo Mashimo entered the ring and attacked Makabe, revealing himself as the newest member of Suzuki-gun. On September 23 at Destruction, Makabe ended his rivalry with Suzuki-gun by defeating Mashimo in a singles match. The following day, Harry Smith was renamed Davey Boy Smith Jr., after his father.

On October 8 at King of Pro-Wrestling, Smith and Archer, now known collectively as Killer Elite Squad (K.E.S.), defeated Tencozy to win the IWGP Tag Team Championship, bringing Suzuki-gun its first title. Later, in the main event of the evening, Minoru Suzuki unsuccessfully challenged Hiroshi Tanahashi for the IWGP Heavyweight Championship. From November 20 to December 1, K.E.S. took part in the round-robin portion of the 2012 World Tag League, finishing with a record of four wins and two losses, advancing to the semifinals of the tournament in the second place in their block, while Suzuki and Mashimo failed to advance from the other block with three wins and three losses. On December 2, K.E.S. defeated Always Hypers (Togi Makabe and Wataru Inoue) to advance to the final of the tournament, where, later that same day, they were defeated by Sword & Guns (Hirooki Goto and Karl Anderson). On January 4, 2013, at Wrestle Kingdom 7 in Tokyo Dome, K.E.S. successfully defended the IWGP Tag Team Championship against Sword & Guns, while Minoru Suzuki was defeated by Yuji Nagata in another chapter of their long rivalry.

==== Feud with Chaos (2013–2015) ====
Afterwards, Suzuki-gun began feuding with NJPW's other villainous stable, Chaos. In late January, Taichi was sidelined with a knee injury following a traffic accident, which led to Suzuki-gun recruiting another Taka Michinoku trainee, Hiro Tonai, as his replacement for the February events. After working exclusively against each other in multi-man tag team matches for the first part of February, the rivalry between Suzuki-gun and Chaos built to two singles matches on February 10 at The New Beginning pay-per-view, where Kengo Mashimo was defeated by Shinsuke Nakamura, while Minoru Suzuki defeated Kazuchika Okada with help from Taichi. Meanwhile, K.E.S. retained the IWGP Tag Team Championship against Tencozy, after which Archer challenged Nakamura to a match for the IWGP Intercontinental Championship. Archer went on to fail in his title challenge on March 3 at NJPW's 41st anniversary event. During the same event, Suzuki-gun and Chaos faced off in a four-on-four elimination tag team match, where Suzuki-gun was victorious after Suzuki scored the final elimination over Okada. The rivalry between the two stables continued during the 2013 New Japan Cup, with Okada defeating Archer and Smith defeating Nakamura in their first round matches on March 11. Meanwhile, Suzuki also advanced in the tournament with a win over old rival Yuji Nagata, avenging the loss from Wrestle Kingdom 7 in Tokyo Dome. The second round of the tournament on March 17 saw two more matches between Suzuki-gun and Chaos, when Smith eliminated Yujiro Takahashi, while Toru Yano eliminated Minoru Suzuki to advance to the semifinals. Smith, the final Suzuki-gun member left in the New Japan Cup, was eliminated from the tournament by Hirooki Goto in their semifinal match on March 23.

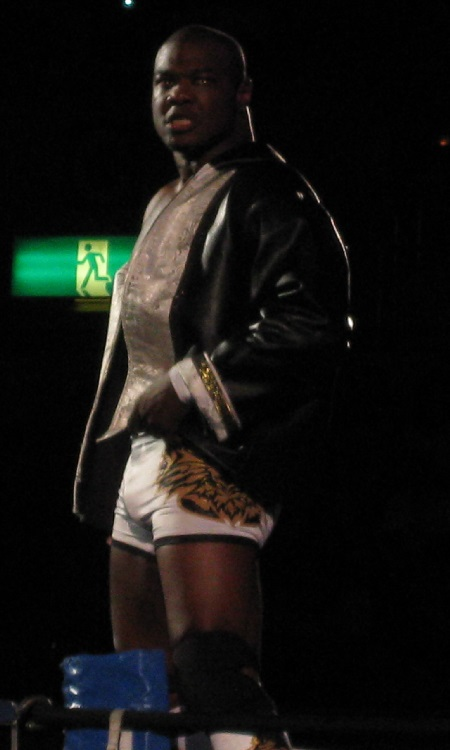
Shelton X Benjamin, who joined the stable in April 2013

On April 5, K.E.S. made their fourth successful defense of the IWGP Tag Team Championship against Chaos representatives Shinsuke Nakamura and Tomohiro Ishii. The rivalry between Suzuki-gun and Chaos continued two days later at Invasion Attack, where Suzuki first defeated Toru Yano to avenge his loss from the second round of the New Japan Cup, and then Smith unsuccessfully challenged Nakamura for the IWGP Intercontinental Championship. The event concluded with Suzuki confronting new IWGP Heavyweight Champion, Kazuchika Okada, seemingly as his first challenger for the title. Following the event, Taka Michinoku announced that Suzuki-gun had recruited a new member to take on Nakamura for the IWGP Intercontinental Championship, noting that he was suitable to challenge for said title. On April 20, the newest member was revealed as former multi-time WWE Intercontinental Champion Shelton X Benjamin. Later that same day, Archer and Smith took part in a National Wrestling Alliance (NWA) event in Houston, Texas, where they defeated The Kingz of the Underground (Ryan Genesis and Scot Summers) to not only retain the IWGP Tag Team Championship, but to also win the NWA World Tag Team Championship. On May 3 at Wrestling Dontaku 2013, K.E.S. lost the IWGP Tag Team Championship back to Tencozy in a four-way match, which also included the Chaos team of Takashi Iizuka and Toru Yano, and Muscle Orchestra (Manabu Nakanishi and Strong Man), ending their reign at 207 days. Later in the event, Shelton X Benjamin unsuccessfully challenged Shinsuke Nakamura for the IWGP Intercontinental Championship, while the main event saw Minoru Suzuki fail in his challenge for the IWGP Heavyweight Championship against Kazuchika Okada.

Suzuki then got involved in a rivalry with Chaos member Tomohiro Ishii, which built to a singles match between the two on July 20 at the Kizuna Road 2013 pay-per-view, where Suzuki was victorious. That same event, Taichi and Michinoku unsuccessfully challenged Chaos members Forever Hooligans (Alex Koslov and Rocky Romero) for the IWGP Junior Heavyweight Tag Team Championship. From August 1 to 11, Suzuki, Archer, Benjamin and Smith took part in the 2013 G1 Climax, with Archer and Smith wrestling in block A and Benjamin and Suzuki in block B. Both Suzuki and Smith entered the final day with a chance to advance to the final, however, Suzuki was eliminated after losing to Toru Yano, while Smith was eliminated after a loss against Archer. On October 14 at King of Pro-Wrestling, Taichi and Michinoku won the IWGP Junior Heavyweight Tag Team Championship for the first time, when they, replacing Kushida and the injured Alex Shelley, who had earlier defeated them in a number one contender's match, defeated the Forever Hooligans for the title. Meanwhile, after avenging his G1 Climax loss against Toru Yano that same event, Suzuki made a challenge for the IWGP Intercontinental Championship with the added stipulation that should Shinsuke Nakamura lose the title to him, he would have to join Suzuki-gun. After a reign of 26 days, Taichi and Michinoku lost the IWGP Junior Heavyweight Tag Team Championship to The Young Bucks (Matt Jackson and Nick Jackson) on November 9 at Power Struggle. Later that same event, K.E.S. took part in a two-fall three-way match against Tencozy and The IronGodz (Jax Dane and Rob Conway). In the first fall, they lost the NWA World Tag Team Championship to The IronGodz, but came back in the second to defeat Tencozy for the IWGP Tag Team Championship. Also during the event, Suzuki failed in his IWGP Intercontinental Championship challenge against Nakamura.

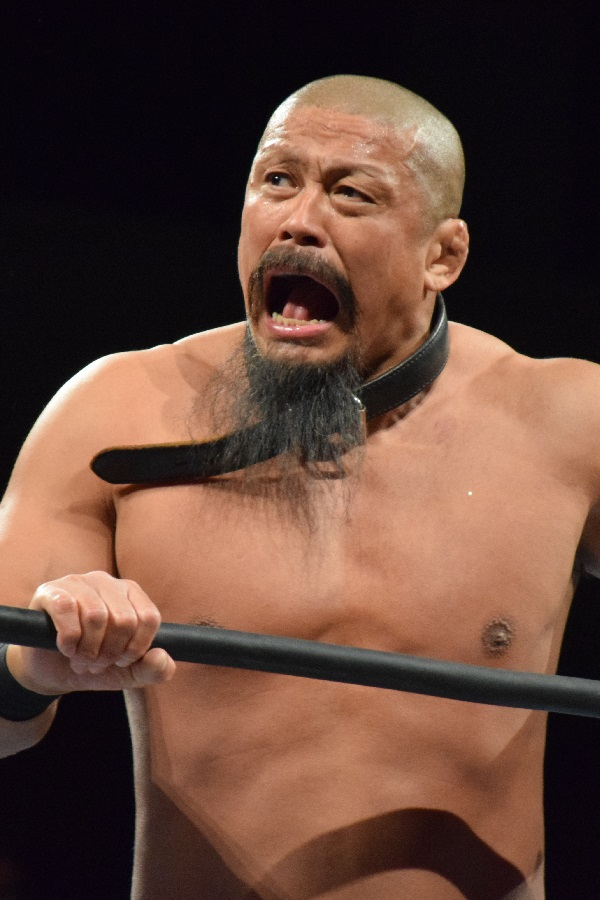
Takashi Iizuka, who jumped to Suzuki-gun from Chaos in May 2014

On November 24, two Suzuki-gun teams entered the 2013 World Tag League, competing in two separate blocks; K.E.S. in block A and Suzuki and Benjamin in block B. K.E.S. won their block with a record of five wins and one loss, while Suzuki and Benjamin were eliminated with a record of three wins and three losses, after losing to Takashi Iizuka and Toru Yano in their final round-robin match. On December 8, K.E.S. was also eliminated from the tournament in the semifinals by their old rival team, Tencozy. On January 4, 2014, at Wrestle Kingdom 8 in Tokyo Dome, K.E.S. lost the IWGP Tag Team Championship to the winners of the tournament, Bullet Club (Doc Gallows and Karl Anderson). Also during the event, Michinoku and Taichi unsuccessfully challenged The Young Bucks for the IWGP Junior Heavyweight Tag Team Championship in a four-way match and Suzuki continued his feud with Toru Yano, with him and Benjamin losing to Yano and The Great Muta in a tag team match. Suzuki and Yano continued their rivalry for the next few months, leading to a tag team match at Back to the Yokohama Arena on May 25, where Yano's longtime tag team partner Takashi Iizuka turned on him during a tag team match, where they faced Suzuki and Benjamin, and jumped to Suzuki-gun. On June 9, NJPW suspended Taichi for two months with a 30% pay cut, after he had been caught cheating on his wife. On July 4, El Desperado joined Suzuki-gun, announcing his intention of bringing the IWGP Junior Heavyweight Championship to the stable. From July 21 to August 8, four members of Suzuki-gun took part in the 2014 G1 Climax with Benjamin and Smith wrestling in block A and Suzuki and Archer in block B. All four failed to advance from their blocks with Benjamin finishing tied fifth and Smith eighth in their block of eleven and Suzuki finishing fourth and Archer tied sixth in their block. Following the tournament, Suzuki transitioned from Yano, who was busy feuding with Iizuka, to a new rivalry with Kazushi Sakuraba, who had come to Yano's aid in the aftermath of Iizuka's turn.

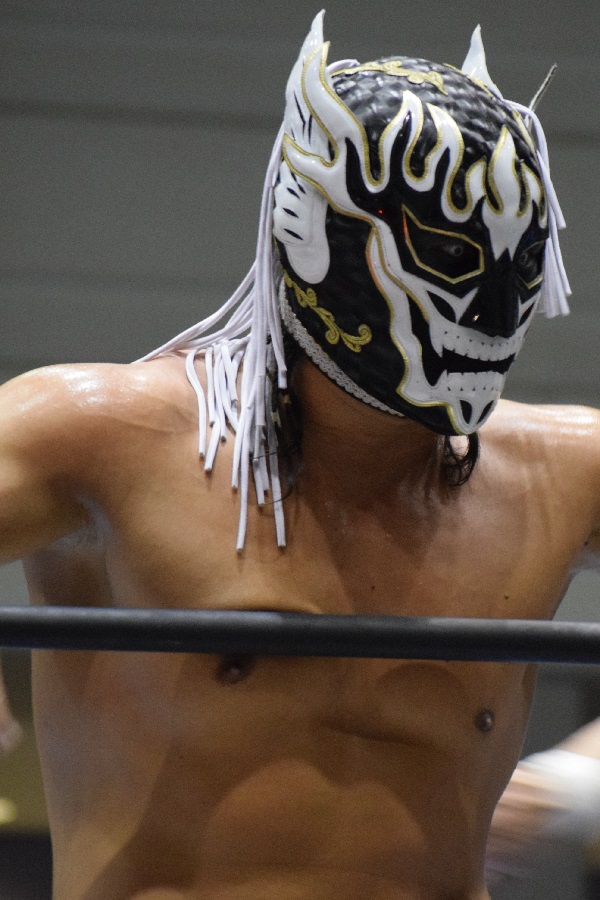
El Desperado, part of the "Suzuki-gun Junior" trio

During September's Destruction tour, Suzuki-gun's three junior heavyweight members, referred to collectively as "Suzuki-gun Junior", set their sights on both of NJPW's junior heavyweight titles. On September 23 at Destruction in Okayama, El Desperado and Taichi failed in their attempt to capture the IWGP Junior Heavyweight Tag Team Championship from the Time Splitters (Alex Shelley and Kushida). On October 13 at King of Pro-Wrestling, K.E.S. defeated Tencozy to regain the NWA World Tag Team Championship. Later that same event, El Desperado unsuccessfully challenged Ryusuke Taguchi for the IWGP Junior Heavyweight Championship, despite outside interference from Taichi and Michinoku. The Suzuki-gun Junior trio continued chasing the junior heavyweight titles during the 2014 Super Jr. Tag Tournament. Though El Desperado and Taichi were eliminated from the tournament in the semifinals by The Young Bucks, Taichi managed to pin Ryusuke Taguchi in the opening round of the tournament, with help from both Desperado and Taka Michinoku, putting himself in line for the next shot at the IWGP Junior Heavyweight Championship. Taichi received his title shot on November 8 at Power Struggle, but was defeated by Taguchi. Later in the month, two Suzuki-gun teams took part in the same block in the 2014 World Tag League; K.E.S. and Suzuki and Iizuka. Both teams narrowly missed the final of the tournament due to losses on the final day; K.E.S. with a record of four wins and three losses and Suzuki and Iizuka with a record of three wins, one draw and three losses. K.E.S. was victorious in the head-to-head match between the two Suzuki-gun teams. The rivalry between Suzuki and Sakuraba culminated in a "knockouts and submissions only" match on January 4, 2015, at Wrestle Kingdom 9 in Tokyo Dome, where Suzuki was victorious. Also during the event, the Suzuki-gun quartet of Iizuka, Archer, Benjamin and Smith were defeated in an eight-man tag team match by Yano and Pro Wrestling Noah's Naomichi Marufuji and TMDK (Mikey Nicholls and Shane Haste). The following day, El Desperado unsuccessfully challenged Jyushin Thunder Liger for the NWA World Junior Heavyweight Championship.

==== Pro Wrestling Noah invasion (2015–2016) ====
The day after Wrestle Kingdom 9 in Tokyo Dome, Suzuki-gun declared war on Naomichi Marufuji and TMDK for them coming to Yano's aid at the event. On January 10, the entire Suzuki-gun made a surprise appearance for Pro Wrestling Noah, occupying the ring after the main event where Marufuji had successfully defended his GHC Heavyweight Championship. While Suzuki hit Marufuji with his finishing move, the Gotch-Style Piledriver, his stablemates attacked everyone who tried to enter the ring to stop him, including new GHC Tag Team Champions TMDK and GHC Junior Heavyweight Champion Atsushi Kotoge. The members of Suzuki-gun made their Noah in-ring debuts at the January 12 event, where El Desperado defeated Hitoshi Kumano in a singles match, Archer, Iizuka and Smith defeated TMDK (Nicholls, Haste and Jonah Rock) in a six-man tag team match and Suzuki, Benjamin, Michinoku and Taichi defeated Brave (Marufuji, Kotoge, Muhammad Yone and Taiji Ishimori) in an eight-man tag team main event. Over the next four weeks, all eight members of Suzuki-gun also worked all subsequent Noah events. The first big event of the storyline was on February 11 with a card full of matches between members of Suzuki-gun and Noah and a main event, where K.E.S. defeated Haste and Nicholls with help from El Desperado to win the GHC Tag Team Championship. Noah's March 15 event saw Suzuki-gun featured in matches for all four of the promotion's titles. In the first two, Suzuki-gun captured both of Noah's junior heavyweight titles with El Desperado and Taka Michinoku defeating Choukibou-gun's Hajime Ohara and Kenoh and No Mercy's Daisuke Harada and Genba Hirayanagi for the GHC Junior Heavyweight Tag Team Championship and Taichi defeating Atsushi Kotoge, with help from El Desperado and Michinoku, for the GHC Junior Heavyweight Championship. The third saw K.E.S. defeat TMDK in a rematch to make their first successful defense of the GHC Tag Team Championship. Finally, in the main event, Suzuki completed Suzuki-gun's clean sweep by defeating Naomichi Marufuji to become the new GHC Heavyweight Champion.

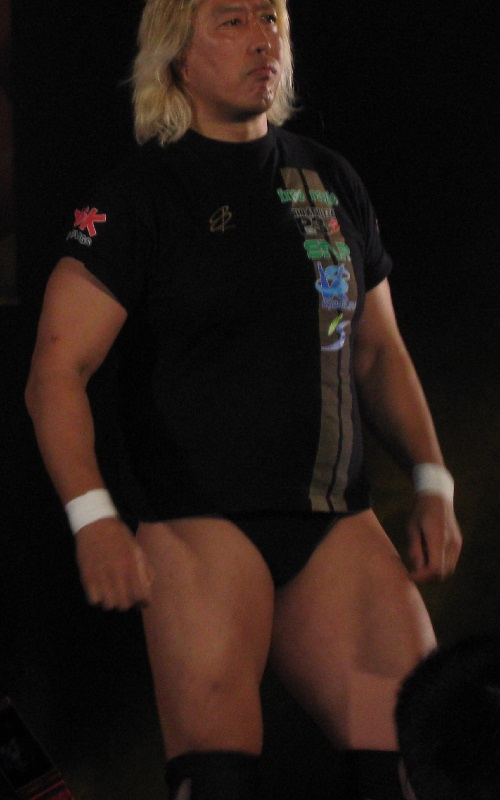
Yoshihiro Takayama, who turned on Suzuki-gun during the stable's invasion of Pro Wrestling Noah

Suzuki-gun's dominance led to a storyline, where all of Noah's stables, villainous ones included, came together in order to reclaim the titles. As part of the storyline, Yoshihiro Takayama officially broke off his affiliation with Suzuki-gun by announcing his loyalty to Noah on March 28. In April, Suzuki-gun entered the 2015 Global Tag League with two teams; Suzuki and Iizuka and K.E.S. Benjamin also took part in the tournament, teaming with Brian Breaker. K.E.S. eventually made it to the final of the tournament, where, on May 4, they were defeated by Dangan Yankies (Masato Tanaka and Takashi Sugiura). All four of Suzuki-gun's titles were put on the line on May 10 and all were defended successfully. First El Desperado and Michinoku successfully defended the GHC Junior Heavyweight Tag Team Championship against Yoshinari Ogawa and Zack Sabre Jr. and then helped Taichi defeat Atsushi Kotoge to retain the GHC Junior Heavyweight Championship. In the semi-main event, K.E.S. avenged their Global Tag League loss against Dangan Yankies by defeating them to retain the GHC Tag Team Championship, albeit following outside interference from Benjamin. The main event featured Kenta Kobashi making sure that the rest of Suzuki-gun did not interfere in the match, but nonetheless Suzuki defeated Marufuji in a rematch to make his first successful defense of the GHC Heavyweight Championship.

On June 9, Suzuki-gun produced their own show in Korakuen Hall, entitled We Are Suzuki-gun, where K.E.S. made their third successful defense of the NWA World Tag Team Championship against Tencozy. On June 15, Suzuki made his second successful defense of the GHC Heavyweight Championship against Maybach Taniguchi, after which he was attacked by former stablemate Takayama, who issued a challenge for a title match. On July 18 at Noah's 15th anniversary event, Suzuki defeated Takayama, following outside interference from El Desperado, K.E.S. and Iizuka, to make his third successful defense of the GHC Heavyweight Championship. Afterwards, Takashi Sugiura, who earlier in the event had defeated Shelton X Benjamin in their personal grudge match, stepped up as Suzuki's next challenger.

Through late July and early August, both El Desperado and Michinoku took part in the 2015 Global Junior Heavyweight League, wrestling in separate blocks. Although both managed to secure early wins, losses on the final day of the tournament prevented them from making it to the final. The winner, Daisuke Harada, issued a challenge to Taichi afterwards. On September 19, after Suzuki had made his fourth successful defense of the GHC Heavyweight Championship against Takashi Sugiura, he was again challenged for the GHC Heavyweight Championship by Naomichi Marufuji, prompting Suzuki to present an added stipulation for their match; should Marufuji lose, Noah would be dissolved. Uniting the entire Noah roster together, Marufuji stated he was prepared to dissolve Noah if any member of Suzuki-gun was able to win the upcoming Global League. Meanwhile, El Desperado and Taka Michinoku made it to the final of the 2015 NTV G+ Cup Junior Heavyweight Tag League, but were defeated there on September 22 by Atsushi Kotoge and Daisuke Harada. This led to a match on October 4, where Suzuki-gun's title monopoly was broken, when El Desperado and Michinoku lost the GHC Junior Heavyweight Tag Team Championship to Kotoge and Harada in their fifth defense.

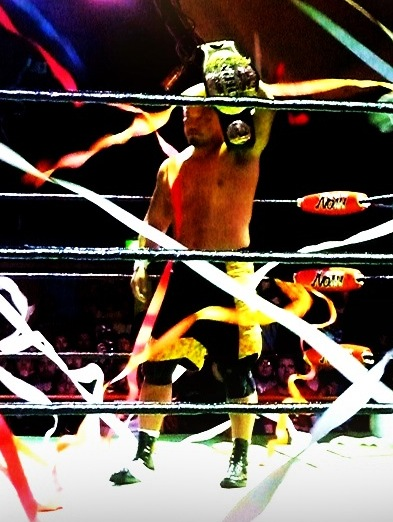
Takashi Sugiura, who held the GHC Heavyweight Championship twice as a member of Suzuki-gun

From October 16 to November 6, five members of Suzuki-gun took part in the 2015 Global League. In block A, Archer and Smith both finished their tournament with a record of three wins and four losses with Smith winning the head-to-head match between the K.E.S. members. In block B, Iizuka finished with a record six losses and one draw, wrestled against Suzuki on the final day, which eliminated Suzuki from advancing to the final with a record of five wins and two draws. Instead, Benjamin won the block and advanced to the final with a record of six wins and one draw, wrestled against Suzuki. On November 8, Benjamin was defeated in the final of the tournament by Naomichi Marufuji. Noah ended their 2015 on December 23 with the promotion's 15h anniversary event, Destiny 2015, where all members of Suzuki-gun were involved in big matches. The stable's members were defeated in both junior heavyweight title matches with El Desperado and Michinoku failing to regain the GHC Junior Heavyweight Tag Team Championship from Kotoge and Harada, while Taichi lost the GHC Junior Heavyweight Championship to Taiji Ishimori, ending his nine-month reign in his fifth defense. Out of the six matches they were involved in, Suzuki-gun won only one, which saw K.E.S. make their fifth successful defense of the GHC Tag Team Championship against Big in USA. In the main event, with Noah's future supposedly on the line, Suzuki lost the GHC Heavyweight Championship back to Global League winner Naomichi Marufuji in his fifth official title defense. During Marufuji's victory celebration, Takashi Sugiura turned on him and Noah and joined Suzuki-gun.

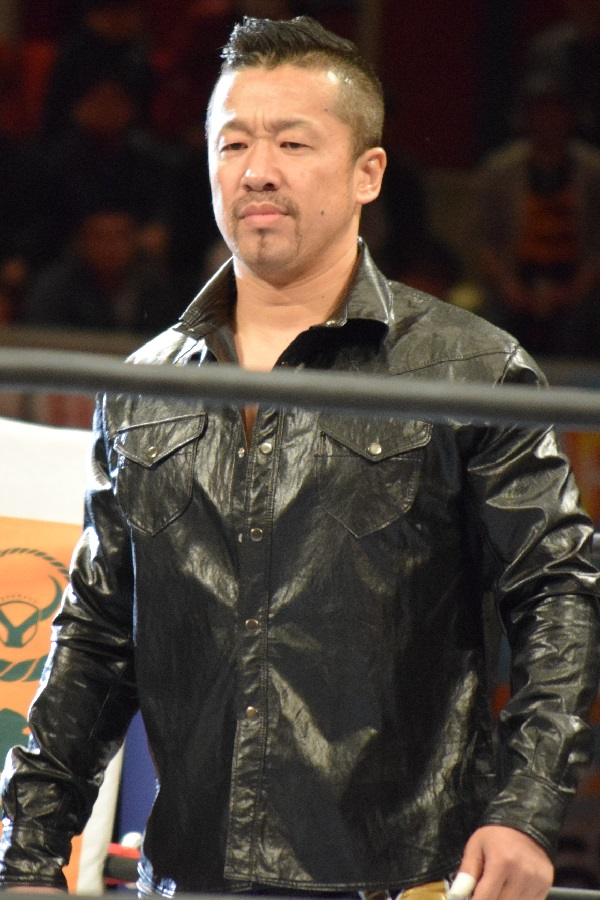
Yoshinobu Kanemaru, who joined Suzuki-gun during its time in Pro Wrestling Noah

On January 31, 2016, Sugiura defeated Marufuji with help from Archer and Suzuki to bring the GHC Heavyweight Championship back to Suzuki-gun. Prior to the event, Suzuki teased the possibility of there being another traitor within Noah. During his match with Go Shiozaki, Yoshinobu Kanemaru revealed himself as the traitor by turning on Shiozaki, helping Suzuki win the match and joining Suzuki-gun. On February 24, Kanemaru defeated Taiji Ishimori with help from his new stablemates to become the new GHC Junior Heavyweight Champion. On March 27, Suzuki-gun produced the second We Are Suzuki-gun event. The following month, K.E.S. set a new record for most successful defenses of the GHC Tag Team Championship by making three defenses on the American independent circuit. From April 21 to May 3, three teams representing Suzuki-gun took part in the 2016 Global Tag League; K.E.S., Benjamin and Sugiura, and Suzuki and Iizuka. Suzuki and Iizuka finished the tournament with six points and Benjamin and Sugiura with eight points, while K.E.S. won the single round-robin block with ten points, advancing to the final. On May 4, Archer and Smith were defeated in the final of the tournament by Naomichi Marufuji and Toru Yano. On May 28, Archer and Smith lost the GHC Tag Team Championship to Marufuji and Yano, ending their 15-month title reign in their 11th defense. Later that same day, Sugiura lost the GHC Heavyweight Championship to Go Shiozaki in his second title defense. On July 26, it was announced that Shelton Benjamin was returning to WWE, signaling the end of his run as a member of Suzuki-gun. On July 30, Sugiura regained the GHC Heavyweight Championship from Go Shiozaki in the first lumberjack match in Noah history. Also in July, Suzuki-gun returned to NJPW, when Taichi and Yoshinobu Kanemaru represented the stable in the 2016 Super J-Cup. The two had earned the spots in the tournament by winning a round-robin tournament, contested between the four Suzuki-gun junior heavyweight wrestlers. Both made it to the final day on August 21, where both were defeated by reigning IWGP Junior Heavyweight Champion Kushida with Taichi losing to him in the semifinals and Kanemaru in the final. Back in Noah, Kanemaru lost the GHC Junior Heavyweight Championship to Atsushi Kotoge in his fifth defense on September 23. On October 23, Sugiura lost the GHC Heavyweight Championship to Katsuhiko Nakajima in his third defense.

The following month, five members of Suzuki-gun took part in the 2016 Global League with Suzuki, Archer and Iizuka in block A and Smith and Sugiura in block B. Suzuki advanced to the final of the tournament by winning his block with a record of six wins and one loss, while Archer finished with a record of four wins and three losses and Iizuka with one win and six losses. Meanwhile, both Smith and Sugiura finished their block with a record of four wins and three losses. On November 23, K.E.S. regained the GHC Tag Team Championship from Naomichi Marufuji and Toru Yano. That same day, Suzuki defeated Masa Kitamiya in the final to win the 2016 Global League. Following his win, Suzuki challenged GHC Heavyweight Champion Katsuhiko Nakajima to a Loser Leaves Noah match on December 2. On December 2, Suzuki was defeated by Nakajima in the match for the GHC Heavyweight Championship. Following the match, Suzuki-gun entered the ring to show support for Suzuki, but this led to Sugiura turning on Suzuki-gun, attacking each of his stablemates and quitting the stable. The following day, K.E.S. lost the GHC Tag Team Championship to Go Shiozaki and Maybach Taniguchi in their first defense, while in the main event, Suzuki was defeated by Sugiura. With Suzuki-gun having been defeated in all ten of their matches during the two events, Noah announced on December 5 that the stable was gone from the promotion, concluding the two-year-long storyline. Shortly afterwards, it was reported that Suzuki-gun had originally been sent to Noah to help sustain the promotion, but the relationship between Noah and NJPW had turned "extremely sour", leading to NJPW pulling its wrestlers from the promotion. Suzuki-gun's entry into Noah had not led to increased business for the promotion as had been hoped, but without Suzuki-gun, Noah's attendance numbers fell significantly further.

==== Return to NJPW (2017–2018) ====
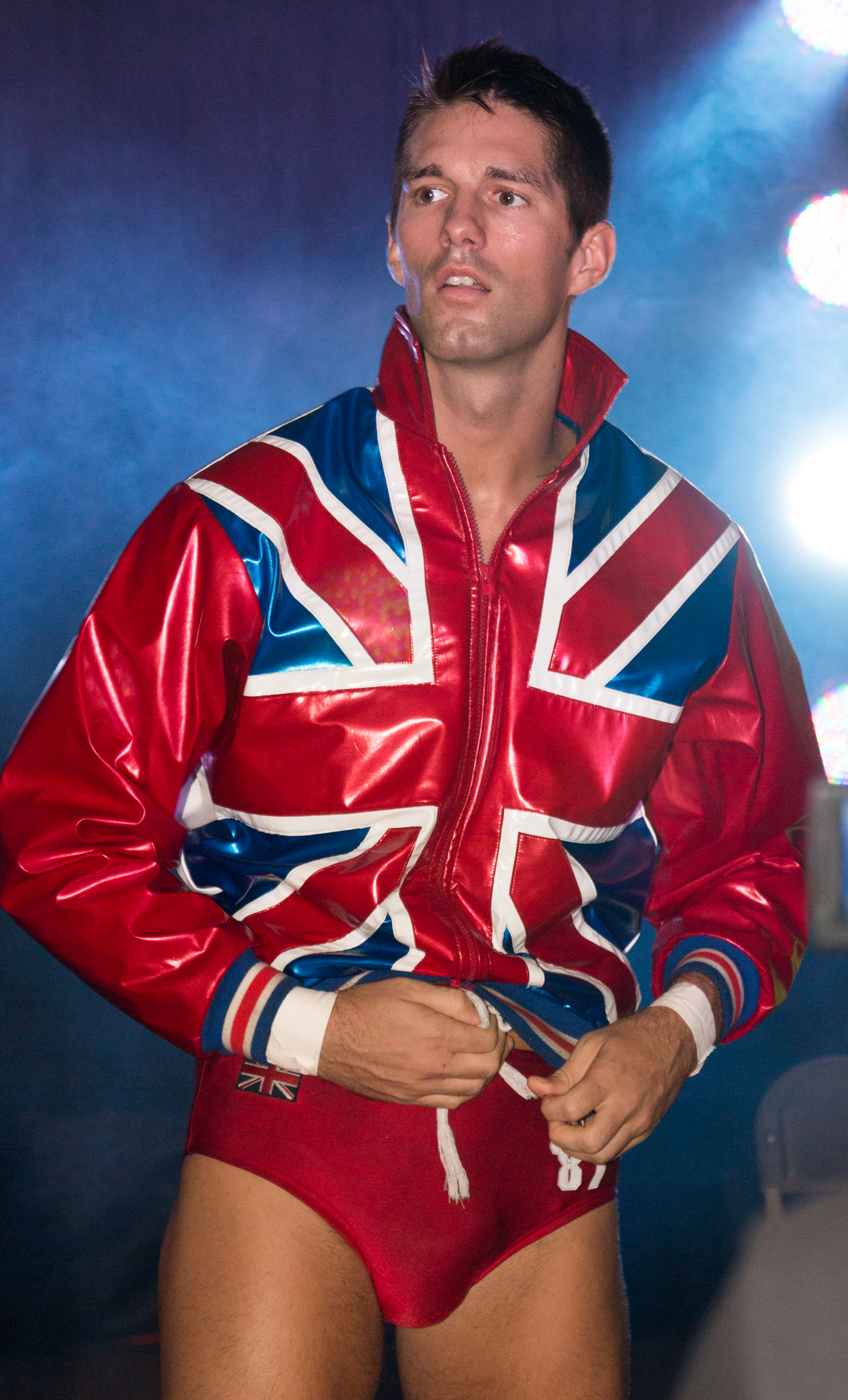
Zack Sabre Jr., the first British member of Suzuki-gun

On January 5, 2017, Suzuki-gun made its return to NJPW after two years away with all eight members attacking the ring following a ten-man tag team match between the Chaos stable and NJPW's main army. The attack saw K.E.S. target IWGP Tag Team Champions Tomohiro Ishii and Toru Yano and concluded with Suzuki laying out IWGP Heavyweight Champion Kazuchika Okada with the Gotch-Style Piledriver. Suzuki then declared war on all of NJPW, including top stables Chaos, Bullet Club, and Los Ingobernables de Japón, stating that Suzuki-gun was going to take over all of the promotion's championships. The angle led to multiple title matches the following month. On February 5 at The New Beginning in Sapporo, Michinoku and Taichi unsuccessfully challenged Roppongi Vice (Beretta and Rocky Romero) for the IWGP Junior Heavyweight Tag Team Championship. Later that same event, K.E.S. unsuccessfully challenged Ishii and Yano for the IWGP Tag Team Championship in a three-way match, also involving Togi Makabe and Tomoaki Honma. In the main event of the show, Suzuki unsuccessfully challenged Okada for the IWGP Heavyweight Championship. Six days later at The New Beginning in Osaka, Smith and Iizuka, replacing an injured Archer, unsuccessfully challenged Ishii and Yano for the IWGP Tag Team Championship in another three-way match involving Makabe and Honma.

On March 6 at NJPW's 45th anniversary show, Kanemaru and Taichi defeated Roppongi Vice to become the new IWGP Junior Heavyweight Tag Team Champions. Later that same event, Suzuki and Smith helped Zack Sabre Jr. defeat Katsuyori Shibata for Revolution Pro Wrestling's British Heavyweight Championship with Sabre becoming the newest member of Suzuki-gun in the process. The following day, Sabre was set up as the next challenger for Hirooki Goto's NEVER Openweight Championship. Sabre went on to fail in that challenge on April 9, despite help from El Desperado and Minoru Suzuki, the latter of whom afterwards brawled with Goto. This led to Suzuki defeating Goto on April 27 to become the new NEVER Openweight Champion, winning his first ever singles title in NJPW. That same day, Taichi and Kanemaru lost the IWGP Junior Heavyweight Tag Team Championship back to Roppongi Vice in their second defense. During the following summer, Suzuki and Sabre represented Suzuki-gun in the 2017 G1 Climax, wrestling in separate blocks. Both failed to advance to the final with Suzuki finishing with a record of four wins, four losses and one draw and Sabre finishing with five wins and four losses. On September 24 at Destruction in Kobe, K.E.S. won the IWGP Tag Team Championship for the first time in three years and eight months by defeating War Machine (Hanson and Raymond Rowe) and Guerrillas of Destiny (Tama Tonga and Tanga Loa) in a tornado tag team match. On January 4, 2018, at Wrestle Kingdom 12 in Tokyo Dome, K.E.S. lost the IWGP Tag Team Championship to Los Ingobernables de Japón (Evil and Sanada). Later that same event, Suzuki lost the NEVER Openweight Championship back to Hirooki Goto in a Hair vs. Hair match. On January 20 at Revolution Pro Wrestling High Stakes, Suzuki and Sabre would win the RPW Undisputed British Tag Team Championships by defeating Moustache Mountain (Trent Seven and Tyler Bate). A week later at The New Beginning in Sapporo, Suzuki would capture the IWGP Intercontinental Championship for the first time by defeating Hiroshi Tanahashi. On March 6 at NJPW's 46th anniversary show, Desperado and Kanemaru would capture the IWGP Junior Heavyweight Tag Team Championship from Roppongi 3K (SHO and YOH) in a 3-way match which also included Los Ingobernables de Japón (Hiromu Takahashi and BUSHI) . Through March, Taichi, Archer, Smith and Sabre would enter the 2018 New Japan Cup. While Taichi, Archer and Smith were eliminated in the first round, Sabre would go on to the final and win the tournament, and upon his victory, requested a match against Kazuchika Okada for the IWGP Heavyweight Championship at Sakura Genesis, which Okada accepted. On April 1 at Sakura Genesis, Desperado and Kanemaru made their first successful defense of the IWGP Junior Heavyweight Tag Team championship in a 3-way rematch against Roppongi 3K and Los ingobernables de japon. In the main event, Sabre unsuccessfully challenged Okada for the IWGP Heavyweight Championship. On April 29, at Wrestling Hinokuni, Suzuki lost the IWGP Intercontinental Championship to Tetsuya Naito in his second defense. On July 1, at Revolution Pro Wrestling Strong Style Evolved, Suzuki defeated Tomohiro Ishii to win the RPW British Heavyweight Championship for the first time, making him a dual champion in the process. Both Suzuki and Sabre would represent Suzuki-Gun again in the 2018 G1 Climax, wrestling in separate blocks once more, both failed to advance to the final with Suzuki finishing with a record of five wins and four losses and Sabre finishing with six wins and two losses, with the latter narrowly missing the final due to head-to-head losses against eventual runner-up Kota Ibushi and IWGP Heavyweight Champion Kenny Omega.

On September 17 at Destruction in Beppu, Taichi defeated Hirooki Goto to win the NEVER Openweight Championship, his first singles title in NJPW. At the same event, Suzuki was defeated by Tetsuya Naito in a special singles rematch. On November 3 at Power Struggle, Taichi lost the NEVER Openweight Championship back to Goto in his first defense, ending his reign at 47 days. From November 17 to December 9, three Suzuki-Gun teams would participate in the World Tag League, K.E.S, Suzuki and Iizuka and Taichi and Sabre. With each team finishing the single block tournament with 18, 10 and 16 points respectively, with K.E.S narrowly missing the final after a head-to-head loss against Evil and Sanada.

==== Championship success (2019–2021) ====
On January 4, 2019, at Wrestle Kingdom 13, Desperado and Kanemaru lost the IWGP Junior Heavyweight Tag Team Championship to Bushi and Shingo Takagi, in a 3 way rematch which also included Roppongi 3K. At the same event, Sabre defeated Tomohiro Ishii to win back the British Heavyweight Championship. The following day at New Years Dash, Suzuki-Gun faced Los ingobernables de Japon in a ten man tag team match, which was won by Suzuki-Gun after Taichi pinned the newly crowned IWGP Intercontinental champion Tetsuya Naito, and immediately challenged him for the title afterward. Backstage, Suzuki & Sabre also issued a challenge to Evil and Sanada for the IWGP Tag Team Championship, while Desperado and Kanemaru followed suit and demanded a rematch against Bushi and Takagi. All three title matches took place on the second night of The New Beginning in Sapporo on February 3, where all of Suzuki-Gun were defeated in their respective title matches.

On January 7, 2019, NJPW Chairman Naoki Sugabayashi announced that Takashi Iizuka would retire from professional wrestling the following month in a press conference, with his retirement match taking place on February 21. During this period, Hiroyoshi Tenzan, whom Iizuka turned on in 2008, made repeated attempts to reform Iizuka back to his normal self, failing to do so each time. Despite this setback, Tenzan declared that he was not going to settle until Iizuka's final match. On February 21, at New Japan Road, Tenzan, along with Toru Yano and Kazuchika Okada, defeated the team of Suzuki, Taichi and Iizuka in Iizuka's retirement match, with Tenzan pinning Iizuka with the Moonsault for the victory. Post match, Tenzan made one final effort to bring the old Iizuka back momentarily, which resulted in Iizuka giving in and shook his hand for a mere second. Only to be attacked by Iizuka and the rest of Suzuki-Gun immediately afterward. Iizuka then hit Tenzan with his signature iron glove for the final time before leaving it in the ring and storming off. At the end of the event, Iizuka's iron glove would be adopted by Taichi, who then left the ring with the glove and claiming it for himself.

On March 8, Archer, Sabre, Smith, Suzuki, and Taichi all entered the 2019 edition of the New Japan Cup. With Smith being eliminated in the first round (in what would ultimately end up being his final tour with New Japan, leaving the company and by extension the stable in June), Archer, Suzuki, and Taichi eliminated in the second while Sabre Jr managed to secure a spot into the quarter-finals, only to defeated by Hiroshi Tanahashi. Sabre would go on to face Tanahashi once more at G1 Supercard, this time with the British Heavyweight Championship on the line. At the event, Sabre successfully retained the title against Tanahashi. On May 3 at Wrestling Dontaku, Taichi defeated Jeff Cobb to win the NEVER Openweight Championship for the second time. The following night on May 4, Taichi would nominate Tomohiro Ishii as the next challenger for his title,

On May 10, 2019, El Desperado was pulled from the Annual Best of the Super Juniors Tournament due to injury, and Taichi revealed Suzuki-gun's newest member Douki to take his place. Douki would finish with only 2 points in the Tournament. Kanemaru and Taka Michinoku would also participate in the Tournament. Kanemaru finishing with 6 points, and Taka finishing with 0 after suffering an injury.

Ishii defeated Taichi to win the title on June 9 at Dominion. Following this, it was announced that Taichi would be participating in the G1 Climax 29, making it his first appearance in the tournament. Archer would also be making an appearance in the tournament for the first time in five years. Sabre would also make his 3rd consecutive appearance in the tournament. And Minoru Suzuki was left out of the tournament. Sabre finished the tournament with 8 points, Taichi finished the tournament with 8 points, and Archer finished the tournament with 6 points. On the final day of the tournament, during a tag match Suzuki would pin current Heavyweight Champion Kazuchika Okada, he then would challenge Okada for the title. It was later announced that Okada and Suzuki would meet at Royal Quest. Sabre and Tanahashi would also meet for Sabre's British Heavyweight Championship, after Tanahashi earned the match by beating Sabre in the G1. At the event, Tanahashi would defeat Sabre, and Okada would defeat Suzuki. Shortly thereafter during the NJPW Destruction 2019 tour, Sabre would defeat Tanahashi to win back the British Heavyweight Championship.

At King of Pro Wrestling, El Desperado returned from injury and along with Kanemaru would defeat Roppongi 3K, Suzuki would defeat Jushin Thunder Liger in a singles match and Archer would defeat Juice Robinson to win the IWGP United States Championship. At Wrestle Kingdom 14, Archer would lose the United States Championship to Jon Moxley, Taichi, Kanemaru, and Desperado would fail to win the NEVER Openweight 6 Man Tag Team Championship in a gauntlet match, Sabre would defeat SANADA to retain the British Heavyweight Championship, and Suzuki would attack Moxley after he defeated Juice Robinson, challenging him to a title match. Throughout NJPW The New Beginning tour, Suzuki-Gun would be in multiple big matches, with Sabre defeating Will Ospreay to retain the British Heavyweight Championship, Taichi losing to Kazuchika Okada in a singles match, Desperado and Kanemaru unsuccessfully challenging Roppongi 3K for the Junior Heavyweight Tag Team Championships, and Suzuki unsuccessfully challenging Moxley for the United States Championship. Sabre would lose the British Heavyweight Title to Ospreay in a rematch.

After Hiroshi Tanahashi and Kota Ibushi won the IWGP Heavyweight Tag Team Championship, Sabre and Taichi would attack Tanahashi and Ibushi, setting themselves up as the next challengers. It was also during this time that Archer would quietly leave Suzuki-Gun and New Japan as a whole to move to All Elite Wrestling. Suzuki, Sabre, Taichi, Desperado, and Kanemaru all entered the 2020 New Japan Cup, with Suzuki losing to Yuji Nagata in the first round, Sabre losing to Kota Ibushi in the first round, Desperado losing to Tomohiro Ishii in the first round, Kanemaru defeating Yuya Uemura in the first round, before losing to Taiji Ishimori in the second, and Taichi making it the farthest, defeating Hiroshi Tanahashi in the first round, Ibushi in the second, before losing to SANADA in the quarter-finals. On July 12, at Dominion, Taichi and Sabre defeated Tanahashi and Ibushi to win their IWGP Tag Team Championships. On August 29, at Summer Struggle in Jingu, Suzuki would win the NEVER Openweight Championship once again by beating Shingo Takagi, meanwhile Taichi and Zack Sabre Jr. would retain the IWGP Tag Team Championship by beating Hiroshi Tanahashi and Kota Ibushi. On September 11, Desperado and Kanemaru won the IWGP Junior Heavyweight Tag Team Championship for a second time by beating Bushi and Hiromu Takahashi in a tournament final, thus making 5/7 members of this stable champions. At Power Struggle (2020), Suzuki lost the NEVER Openweight Championship back to Takagi. After which Sabre and Taichi lost the IWGP Tag Team Championship to the Guerillas of Destiny at Wrestle Kingdom 15, and Desperado and Kanemaru lost the IWGP Junior Heavyweight Tag Team Championship to Bullet Club's Taiji Ishimori and El Phantasmo, however they regained the tag titles back from them at road to Castle Attack. On February 28 at Castle Attack, Desperado won the vacant IWGP Junior Heavyweight Championship against Bushi & Phantasmo in a 3 way match, making him a double champion. On June 1 at Road to Dominion Sabre and Taichi regained the IWGP Tag Team Championship from the Guerrillas of Destiny.

==== Expansion to All Elite Wrestling and disbandment (2021–2022) ====
At All Elite Wrestling's All Out on September 5, Suzuki made his AEW debut by confronting Jon Moxley. On the episode of Dynamite following All Out on September 8, Moxley beat Suzuki in his debut match for the promotion. The next day, it was announced that he would reunite with Lance Archer under the Suzuki-gun name to confront Moxley again on the 15 September episode of Dynamite, thus bringing Archer back into the stable. On the September 29 episode of Rampage, Archer and Suzuki lost to the team of Eddie Kingston and Moxley in a lights out tag-team match, after the interruption of Homicide. Archer and Suzuki faced the duo again the following month on NJPW Strong in a Philadelphia Street Fight, where they were victorious. On January 4 at Wrestle Kingdom 16, El Desperado, successfully retained the IWGP Junior Heavyweight Championship against Hiromu Takahashi and Suzuki won the Provisional KOPW 2022 trophy, although Dangerous Tekkers lost the IWGP Heavyweight Tag Team titles to Bishoman.

In February during the NJPW New Years Golden Series, Suzuki lost the Provisional KOPW title to Toru Yano. In March, Sabre Jr defeated Tetsuya Naito in the New Japan Cup 2022 final, to win his second New Japan Cup for the group, however, he once again lost to IWGP World Heavyweight Champion Kazuchika Okada at Hyper Battle. In April at Ring of Honor's Supercard of Honor XV, Suzuki defeated Rhett Titus to win the ROH World Television Championship, his first American Professional Wrestling Championship. Suzuki lost the belt 12 days later to Samoa Joe on AEW Dynamite. In May at Wrestling Dontaku, Desperado lost the IWGP Junior Heavyweight Championship to Taiji Ishimori. Desperado attempted to rebound in the Best of the Super Juniors, where he competed in the B Block. Desperado finished top of his block, with 12 points. However, in the finals, Desperado once again lost to Hiromu Takahashi. In June at AEW x NJPW: Forbidden Door, El Desperado and Yoshinobu Kanemaru lost to Swerve in our Glory's Keith Lee and Swerve Strickland and Lance Archer defeated Nick Comoroto on the buy-in. On the main show, Suzuki teamed with the Jericho Appreciation Society's, Chris Jericho and Sammy Guevara to defeat the team of Eddie Kingston, Wheeler Yuta and Shota Umino and Zack Sabre Jr lost to Claudio Castagnoli. In July, Archer, Sabre Jr and Taichi all competed in the G1 Climax 32 tournament, competing in the A, C and B blocks respectively, though no men were able to advance to the semi-final round. In October, Sabre Jr competed in a tournament to crown the inaugural NJPW World Television Championship, he defeated Alex Zayne, David Finlay and Evil to advance to the tournament finals, where he will face Ren Narita at Wrestle Kingdom 17. In November, Archer and Suzuki teamed together in the World Tag League, where they finished with 8 points failing to advance to the finals.

On December 14, 2022, at the Super Junior Tag League & World Tag League Finals, Suzuki announced that Suzuki-gun will disband by the end of the year. At JTO 50th Anniversary for TakaTaichi Together, Taichi told his valet and long Suzuki-gun affiliate Miho Abe, "There is no need for you to stand next to such a pathetic man anymore," ending their relationship and her affiliation to the group prior to the group's disbandment. Suzuki-gun's final match as a faction took place on December 23, where the team of Douki, Kanemaru, Sabre, and Taichi defeated Archer, Desperado, Michinoku, and Suzuki. After the match, all members spoke about their memories as a part of the group and thanked leader Suzuki. Sabre Jr. specifically mentioned that this would be the end of the Dangerous Tekkers tag team too. The night ended with all members posing with the Suzuki-gun flag, only to be interrupted by former member Takashi Iizuka, causing all 9 men to pose in the ring, behind the Suzuki-gun flag.

== Members ==
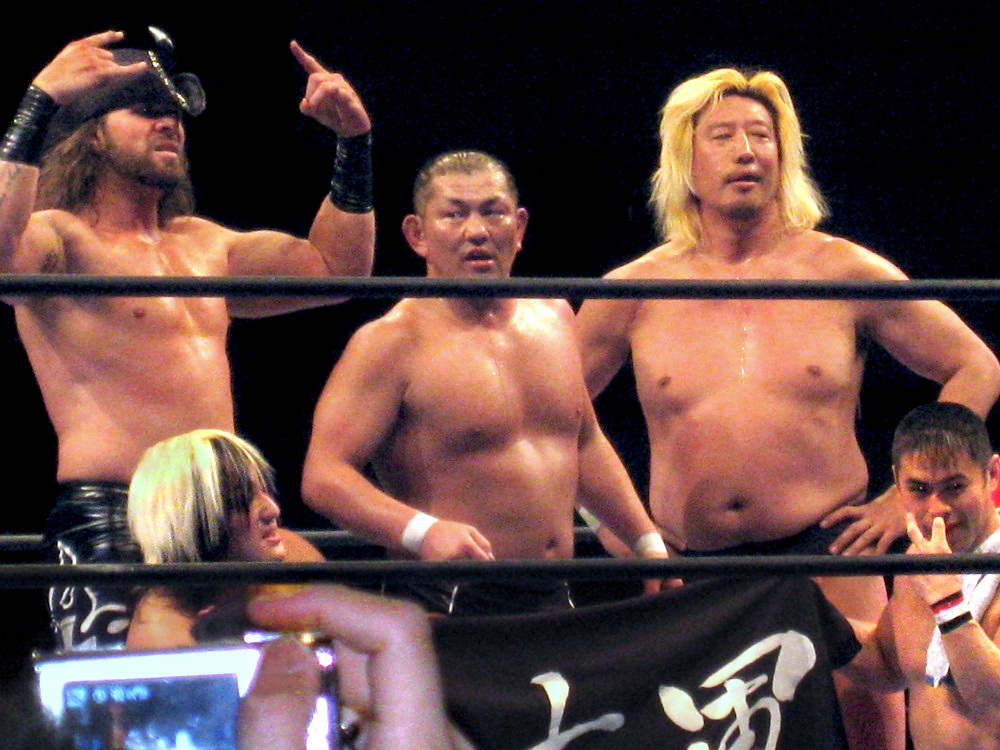
Suzuki-gun in February 2012: (left to right) Lance Archer, Taichi, Minoru Suzuki, Yoshihiro Takayama, and Taka Michinoku

=== Suzuki-gun ===
*	Founding member
L	leader

Member	*	Tenure
Black Tiger (VII)		April 15, 2012 – May 25, 2012
Davey Boy Smith Jr.		September 7, 2012 – June 16, 2019
Douki		May 10, 2019 – December 23, 2022
El Desperado		July 4, 2014 – December 23, 2022
Hiro Tonai		February 2, 2013 – February 12, 2013
Kengo Mashimo		September 7, 2012 – March 3, 2013
Lance Archer		May 15, 2011 – February 24, 2020; September 15, 2021 – December 23, 2022
Shelton X Benjamin		April 20, 2013 – July 26, 2016
Minoru Suzuki	*L	May 3, 2011 – December 23, 2022
Taichi	*	May 3, 2011 – December 23, 2022
Taka Michinoku	*	May 3, 2011 – December 23, 2022
Takashi Iizuka		May 25, 2014 – February 21, 2019
Takashi Sugiura		December 23, 2015 – December 2, 2016
Yoshihiro Takayama		October 10, 2011 – March 28, 2015
Yoshinobu Kanemaru		January 31, 2016 – December 23, 2022
Zack Sabre Jr.		March 6, 2017 – December 23, 2022

=== Kojima-gun ===
Member	Tenure
Satoshi Kojima (leader)	January 28, 2011 – May 3, 2011
MVP	February 20, 2011 – May 3, 2011
Nosawa Rongai	January 28, 2011 – February 20, 2011
Taichi	January 28, 2011 – May 3, 2011
Taka Michinoku	January 28, 2011 – May 3, 2011

== Sub-groups ==
Affiliate	Members	Tenure	Type
Killer Elite Squad	Lance Archer; Davey Boy Smith Jr.	2012–2019	Tag team
Dangerous Tekkers	Taichi; Zack Sabre Jr.	2019–2022	Tag team
El Desperado & Yoshinobu Kanemaru	El Desperado; Yoshinobu Kanemaru	2017–2022	Tag team

== Championships and accomplishments ==
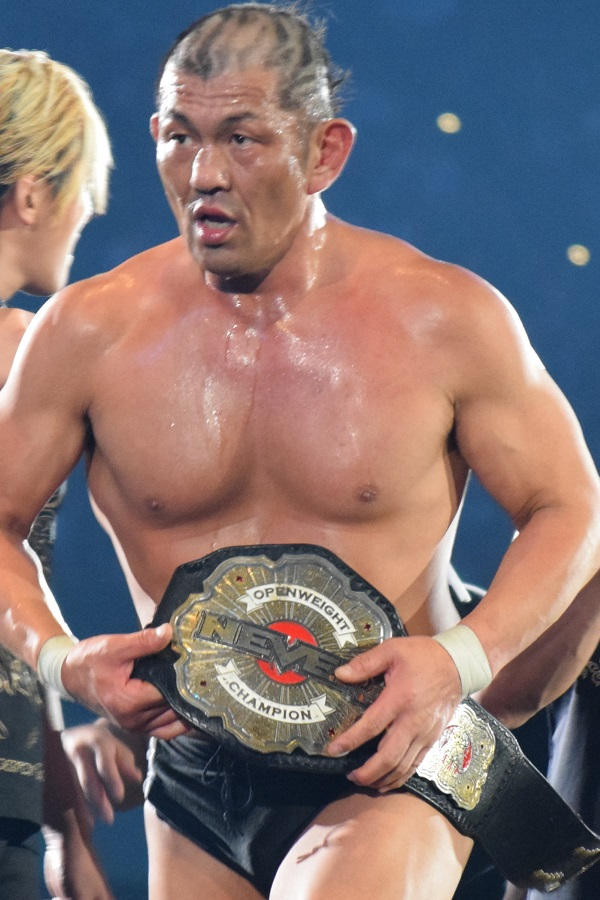
Suzuki as the NEVER Openweight Champion in June 2017

Kojima-gun

- New Japan Pro Wrestling
  - IWGP Heavyweight Championship (1 time) – Kojima

Suzuki-gun

- Defiant Wrestling/WhatCulture Pro Wrestling
  - Defiant Internet Championship/WCPW Internet Championship (1 time) – Sabre
- Evolve
  - Evolve Championship (1 time) – Sabre
- National Wrestling Alliance
  - NWA World Tag Team Championship (2 times) – Archer and Smith
- New Japan Pro-Wrestling
  - IWGP Intercontinental Championship (1 time) – Suzuki
  - IWGP Junior Heavyweight Championship (2 times) — Desperado
  - IWGP Junior Heavyweight Tag Team Championship (6 times) – Taichi and Michinoku (1), Kanemaru and Taichi (1), and Desperado and Kanemaru (4)
  - IWGP Tag Team Championship (6 times) – Archer and Smith (3), Sabre and Taichi (3)
  - IWGP United States Championship (2 times) – Archer (2)
  - NEVER Openweight Championship (4 times) – Suzuki (2) and Taichi (2)
  - G1 Tag League (2011) – Archer and Suzuki
  - New Japan Cup (2018, 2022) – Sabre
  - Road to the Super Jr. 2Days Tournament (2011) – Taichi
  - Super Junior Tag League (2021) – Desperado and Kanemaru
- Pro Wrestling Guerrilla
  - PWG World Championship (1 time) – Sabre
- Pro Wrestling Illustrated
  - Ranked Suzuki No. 19 of the top 500 singles wrestlers in the PWI 500 in 2015 and 2018
  - Ranked Sabre No. 24 of the top 500 singles wrestlers in the PWI 500 in 2018
  - Ranked Sugiura No. 44 of the top 500 singles wrestlers in the PWI 500 in 2016
  - Ranked Smith No. 81 of the top 500 singles wrestlers in the PWI 500 in 2015
  - Ranked Archer No. 92 of the top 500 singles wrestlers in the PWI 500 in 2015
  - Ranked Benjamin No. 124 of the top 500 singles wrestlers in the PWI 500 in 2013
  - Ranked Taichi No.117 of the top 500 singles wrestlers in the PWI 500 in 2018
  - Ranked Desperado No.146 of the top 500 singles wrestlers in the PWI 500 in 2018
  - Ranked Kanemaru No. 223 of the top 500 singles wrestlers in the PWI 500 in 2016
  - Ranked Iizuka No. 334 of the top 500 singles wrestlers in the PWI 500 in 2018
  - Ranked Michinoku No. 340 of the top 500 singles wrestlers in the PWI 500 in 2016 and 2018
- Pro Wrestling Noah
  - GHC Heavyweight Championship (3 times) – Suzuki (1) and Sugiura (2)
  - GHC Junior Heavyweight Championship (2 times) – Taichi (1) and Kanemaru (1)
  - GHC Junior Heavyweight Tag Team Championship (1 time) – Desperado and Michinoku
  - GHC Tag Team Championship (2 times) – Archer and Smith
  - Global League (2016) – Suzuki
- Professional Wrestling Just Tap Out
  - Only Give Up Tournament (2020)
  - King of JTO (1 time, inaugural) – Michinoku
- Revolution Pro Wrestling
  - British Heavyweight Championship (5 times) – Sabre (4), Suzuki (1)
  - Undisputed British Tag Team Championship (1 time) – Suzuki and Sabre
- Ring of Honor
  - ROH World Television Championship (1 time) – Suzuki
- Taka & Taichi Box Office
  - Suzuki-gun Super J-Cup Qualifying League (2016) – Kanemaru and Taichi
- Tokyo Sports
  - Outstanding Performance Award (2015) - Suzuki
  - Best Tag Team Award (2021) - Sabre and Taichi
- Wrestling Observer Newsletter
  - Pro Wrestling Match of the Year (2012) Suzuki vs. Hiroshi Tanahashi on October 8
  - Pro Wrestling Match of the Year (2014) Suzuki vs. A.J. Styles on August 1

== See also ==
- Puroresu
- Killer Elite Squad
