= The New Beginning in Osaka (2017) =

2017 New Japan Pro-Wrestling event

- Promotional poster for the event, featuring various NJPW wrestlers
- Promotion: New Japan Pro-Wrestling
- Date: February 11, 2017
- City: Osaka, Osaka Prefecture, Japan
- Venue: Osaka Prefectural Gymnasium
- Attendance: 5,466

Event chronology
| ← Previous; Road to the New Beginning | Next → Togi Makabe 20th Anniversary |

The New Beginning chronology
| ← Previous; 2017 | Next → 2018 |

New Japan Pro-Wrestling events chronology
| ← Previous; The New Beginning in Sapporo | Next → Honor Rising: Japan 2017 |

The New Beginning in Osaka (2017) was a professional wrestling event promoted by New Japan Pro-Wrestling (NJPW). The event took place on February 11, 2017, in Osaka, Osaka, at Osaka Prefectural Gymnasium and featured nine matches, five of which were contested for championships. In the main event, Tetsuya Naito defended the IWGP Intercontinental Championship against Michael Elgin. This was the twelfth event under the New Beginning name and the fourth under the New Beginning in Osaka name.

== Production ==
=== Background ===
The event aired worldwide on NJPW's internet streaming site, NJPW World, with English commentary provided by Kevin Kelly and Don Callis, the latter of whom replaced Kelly's previous broadcast partner Steve Corino. The event was sold out by January 25.

=== Storylines ===
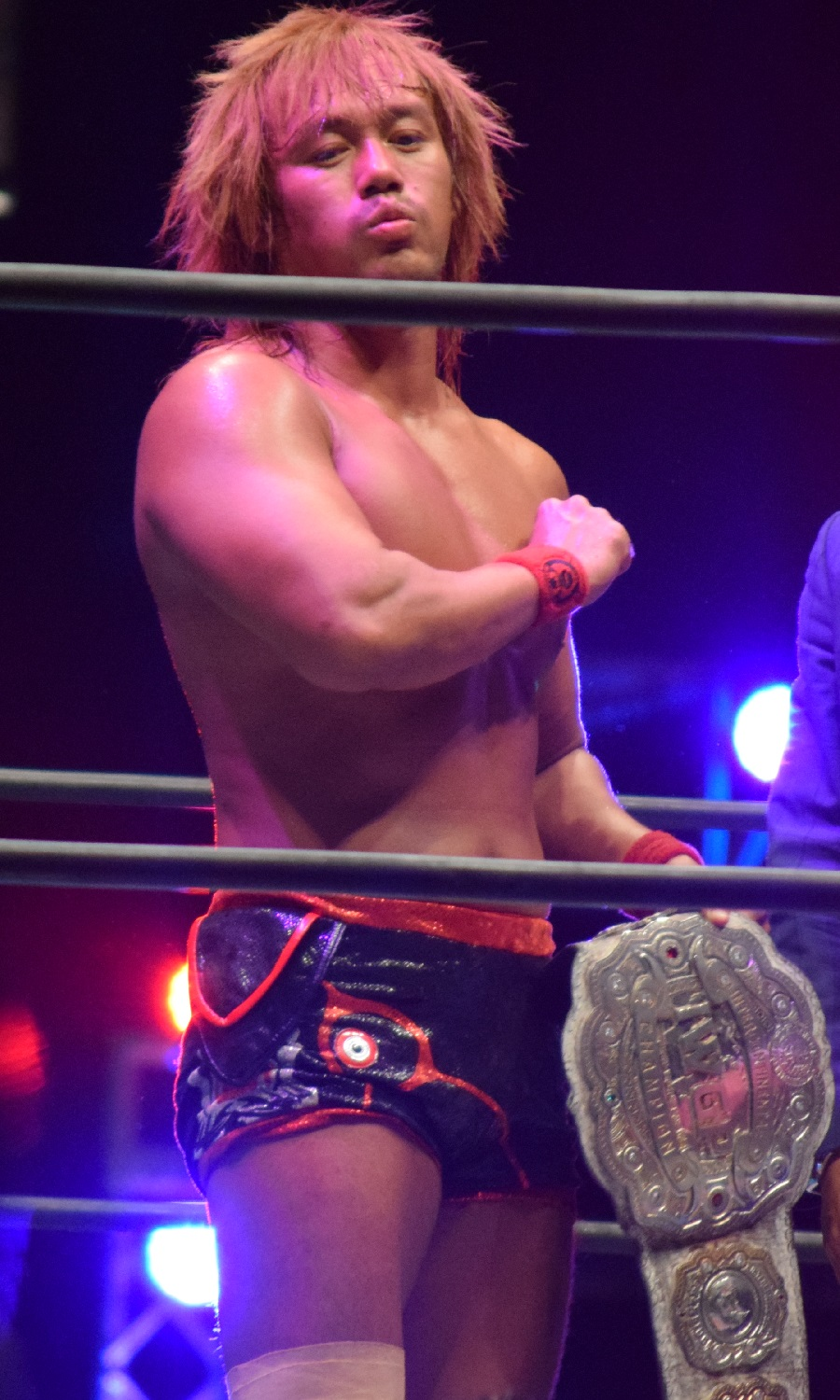
Tetsuya Naito, who defended the IWGP Intercontinental Championship in the main event

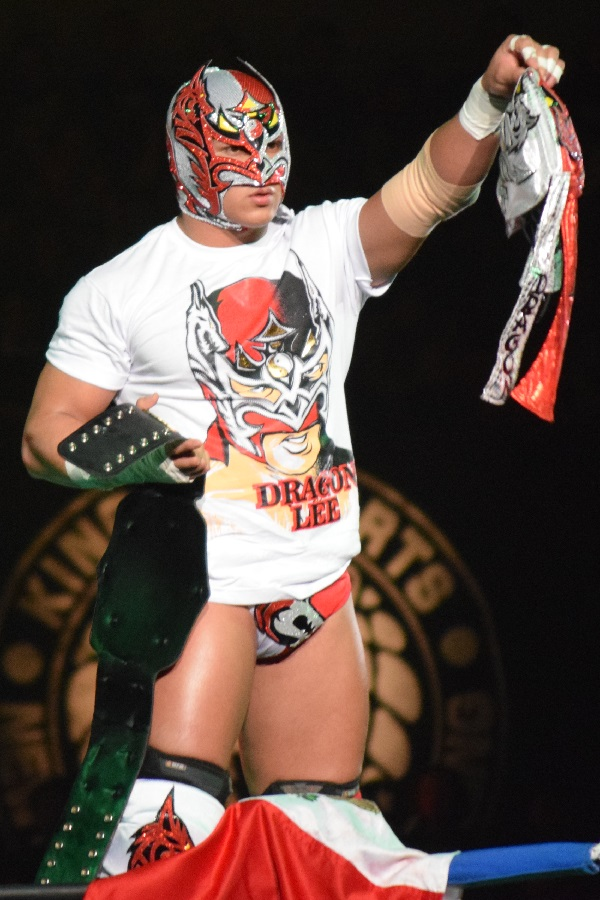
Dragon Lee, who challenged for the IWGP Junior Heavyweight Championship

The New Beginning in Osaka featured nine professional wrestling matches that involved different wrestlers from pre-existing scripted feuds and storylines. Wrestlers portrayed villains, heroes, or less distinguishable characters in the scripted events that built tension and culminated in a wrestling match or series of matches.

The New Beginning in Osaka was main evented by Tetsuya Naito making his third defense of the IWGP Intercontinental Championship against Michael Elgin. Naito originally won the title from Elgin on September 25, 2016, at Destruction in Kobe. A rematch between the two had been scheduled for Power Struggle on November 5, but on October 10, Elgin suffered a legitimate broken left eye socket, while taking a dropkick from Naito, which forced him to pull out of the match. Elgin remained sidelined until Wrestle Kingdom 11 in Tokyo Dome on January 4, 2017, during which he won the pre-show New Japan Rumble. Later that same day, Elgin confronted Naito, after he had successfully defended the Intercontinental Championship against Hiroshi Tanahashi, threatening to crush his jaw as revenge for his orbital fracture. The following day, Elgin pinned Naito in a tag team match to cement his status as Naito's next challenger. The match was officially announced on January 10.

Another top match would see new IWGP Junior Heavyweight Champion Hiromu Takahashi make his first title defense against Consejo Mundial de Lucha Libre (CMLL) wrestler Dragon Lee. The two had developed a storyline rivalry with each other in CMLL, where NJPW had sent Takahashi on a learning excursion. Takahashi, then known as "Kamaitachi", had entered CMLL wearing a mask, but lost it to Dragon Lee during their rivalry in a Lucha de Apuestas Mask vs. Mask match. The rivalry also made it to Japan during the CMLL and NJPW co-produced Fantastica Mania 2016, when Kamaitachi made a surprise appearance on the January 23 event, attacking Dragon Lee. This led to a match the following day, where Kamaitachi defeated Dragon Lee to become the new CMLL World Super Lightweight Champion. After losing the title back to Dragon Lee on March 4, Takahashi's tour of CMLL ended and he returned to NJPW under his real name in November 2016, winning the IWGP Junior Heavyweight Championship at Wrestle Kingdom 11 in Tokyo Dome. The following day, Dragon Lee made a surprise appearance, attacking Takahashi during a match and posing with his IWGP Junior Heavyweight Championship belt afterwards, insinuating he wanted a title match. The match was officially announced five days later. Before the title match, Takahashi and Lee faced off during the NJPW and CMLL co-produced Fantastica Mania 2017 tour. During the January 20 event, Takahashi attacked Lee after he had successfully defended the CMLL World Lightweight Championship against Bárbaro Cavernario, but was laid out himself. On the final day of the tour, January 22, Lee attacked Takahashi after a match, but this time Takahashi got the better of the exchange and unmasked his Osaka challenger. Lee stated that were he to win the IWGP Junior Heavyweight Championship, he could have title matches in both Mexico and Japan, even bringing up the possibility of defending the title against his older brother Místico. Lee also stated that the title would allow him to realize one of his dreams of taking part in NJPW's annual Best of the Super Juniors tournament.

The IWGP Tag Team Championship would also be defended at The New Beginning in Osaka in a three-way match involving Chaos (Tomohiro Ishii and Toru Yano), G.B.H. (Togi Makabe and Tomoaki Honma) and Suzuki-gun's Davey Boy Smith Jr. and Takashi Iizuka. This was originally scheduled to be a rematch from The New Beginning in Sapporo on February 5 with Smith teaming with his regular K.E.S. partner Lance Archer, however, Archer had to pull out of the event due to a herniated disc in his back, leading to Iizuka taking his spot.

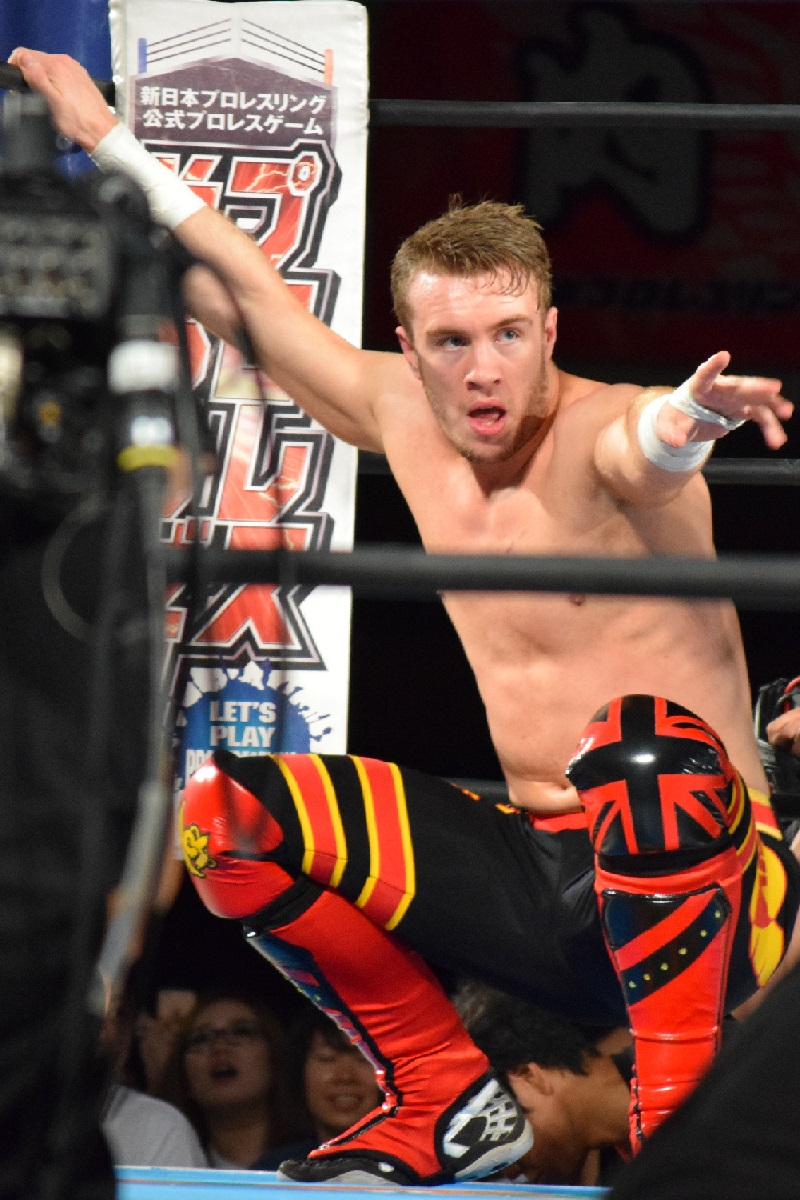
Will Ospreay, who challenged for the British Heavyweight Championship

The New Beginning in Osaka also featured Katsuyori Shibata taking on Will Ospreay. Originally announced on January 10 as a "special singles match", the match was to become a title match, contested for the British Heavyweight Championship, provided that Shibata first retained the title during his tour of English promotion Revolution Pro Wrestling, taking place later in January. On January 21, Shibata successfully defended the title against Matt Riddle in London, England, which led to NJPW officially announcing two days later that the match in Osaka would be contested for the title. As part of NJPW's working relationship with RevPro, Shibata made his debut for the English promotion in July 2016, winning the British Heavyweight Championship from Zack Sabre Jr. the following November. The match between Shibata and Ospreay was set up on January 5, 2017, when Ospreay confronted Shibata and told him that he had something Ospreay wanted.

The final title match of the event would see Hiroshi Tanahashi, Manabu Nakanishi and Ryusuke Taguchi defend the NEVER Openweight 6-Man Tag Team Championship against the Los Ingobernables de Japón trio of Bushi, Evil and Sanada. Bushi, Evil and Sanada won the title in a four-team gauntlet match at Wrestle Kingdom 11 in Tokyo Dome, but lost it the following day to Tanahashi, Nakanishi and Taguchi in what marked Nakanishi's first title win in seven and a half years. On January 10, NJPW announced a rematch between the two teams for The New Beginning in Osaka.

Other notable matches included Kazuchika Okada and Minoru Suzuki facing off in a six-man tag team match, six days after their IWGP Heavyweight Championship match at The New Beginning in Sapporo, where Okada retained the title. Okada teams with his Chaos partners and reigning IWGP Junior Heavyweight Tag Team Champions Roppongi Vice (Beretta and Rocky Romero), while Suzuki teams with his Suzuki-gun partners Taichi and Yoshinobu Kanemaru. Originally Suzuki's partners were announced as Taichi and Taka Michinoku, who challenged Roppongi Vice for the IWGP Junior Heavyweight Tag Team Championship in Sapporo, however, after losing the match, their Suzuki-gun stablemates El Desperado and Kanemaru stepped up as the next challengers, which led to them being switched as Suzuki's partners on February 6. However, two days later, NJPW announced that El Desperado would be forced to miss the event due to a knee injury, which led to Taichi being added back to the match. switch in the Osaka card the following day. The New Beginning in Osaka was noteworthy for Kenny Omega and the entire Bullet Club stable being absent from the event.

== Reception ==
Dave Meltzer of the Wrestling Observer Newsletter gave the main event between Naito and Elgin a full five-star rating, stating that "Naito is clearly New Japan's MVP right now".

== Results ==
| No. | Results | Stipulations | Times |
|---|---|---|---|
| 1 | Taka Michinoku defeated Henare | Singles match | 04:38 |
| 2 | Tencozy (Hiroyoshi Tenzan and Satoshi Kojima) defeated Kushida and Yoshitatsu | Tag team match | 06:57 |
| 3 | Juice Robinson, Jyushin Thunder Liger, Tiger Mask and Yuji Nagata defeated Chaos (Gedo, Hirooki Goto, Jado and Yoshi-Hashi) | Eight-man tag team match | 07:51 |
| 4 | Suzuki-gun (Minoru Suzuki, Taichi and Yoshinobu Kanemaru) (with Taka Michinoku) defeated Chaos (Beretta, Kazuchika Okada and Rocky Romero) | Six-man tag team match | 10:27 |
| 5 | Los Ingobernables de Japón (Bushi, Evil and Sanada) defeated Taguchi Japan (Hiroshi Tanahashi, Manabu Nakanishi and Ryusuke Taguchi) (c) | Six-man tag team match for the NEVER Openweight 6-Man Tag Team Championship | 12:15 |
| 6 | Katsuyori Shibata (c) defeated Will Ospreay | Singles match for the British Heavyweight Championship | 13:51 |
| 7 | Chaos (Tomohiro Ishii and Toru Yano) (c) defeated G.B.H. (Togi Makabe and Tomoaki Honma) and Suzuki-gun (Davey Boy Smith Jr. and Takashi Iizuka) (with Taka Michinoku) | Three-way tag team match for the IWGP Tag Team Championship | 12:31 |
| 8 | Hiromu Takahashi (c) defeated Dragon Lee | Singles match for the IWGP Junior Heavyweight Championship | 18:23 |
| 9 | Tetsuya Naito (c) defeated Michael Elgin | Singles match for the IWGP Intercontinental Championship | 36:17 |
(c) / – the champion(s) heading into the match
