= Bushi (wrestler) =

Japanese professional wrestler (born 1983)

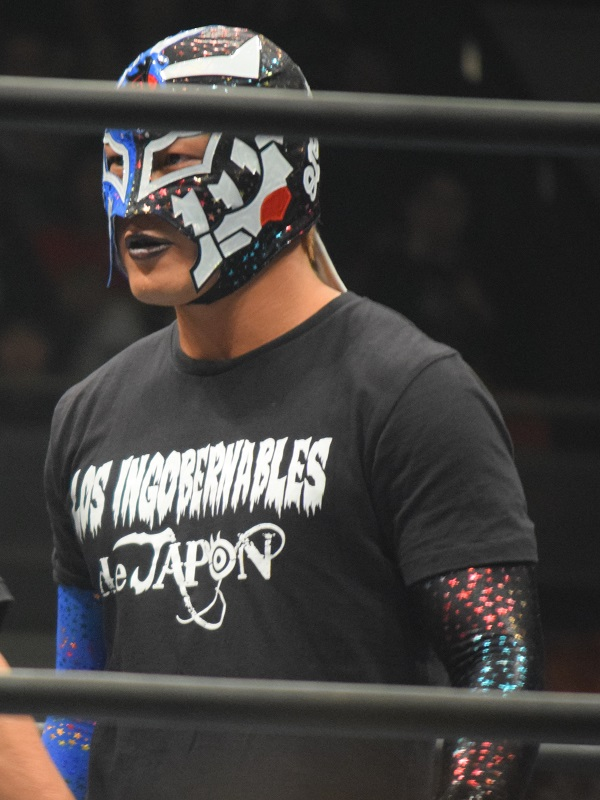
- Bushi in February 2016

Personal information
- Born: Tetsuya Shimizu; April 5, 1983 (age 43) Adachi, Tokyo, Japan

Professional wrestling career
- Ring names: Bushi; Bushiroad; T28; Tetsuya; Tetsuya Bushi
- Billed height: 1.72 m (5 ft 7 1/2 in)
- Billed weight: 83 kg (183 lb)
- Trained by: AJPW Dojo; Animal Hamaguchi; Kaz Hayashi; Keiji Mutoh; Skayde
- Debut: March 12, 2007

Tetsuya Shimizu (清水 哲也, Shimizu Tetsuya; born April 5, 1983), better known by the ring name Bushi (stylized in all caps), is a Japanese professional wrestler. He is working as a freelancer, primarily on the independent circuit and Pro Wrestling Noah, where he is a member of Los Tranquilos de Japón, and is a former one-time GHC Tag Team Champion with stablemate Tetsuya Naito. He is best known for his 13-year tenure in New Japan Pro-Wrestling (NJPW), where he was a member of Los Ingobernables de Japón.

Prior to adopting his current persona, Shimizu worked under the ring names T28 (pronounced 'Tetsuya'), Tetsuya, and Tetsuya Bushi in All Japan Pro Wrestling (AJPW). While in AJPW, together with Super Crazy, Bushi won the 2010 Junior Tag League and won the U-30 Tag Team Tournament in 2008 with Kushida. Bushi spent 2009 working in Mexico for International Wrestling Revolution Group (IWRG), gaining international experience before returning to AJPW in 2010. Having worked for AJPW for most of his career, Bushi transferred to NJPW in April 2012 initially temporarily, with the move becoming permanent in January 2013. In NJPW, he is a one-time IWGP Junior Heavyweight Champion, a one-time IWGP Junior Heavyweight Tag Team Champion with Shingo Takagi and a record-tying five-time NEVER Openweight 6-Man Tag Team Champion, holding the belt three times with Evil and Sanada, once with Evil and Takagi and once with Yota Tsuji and Hiromu Takahashi. Through NJPW’s working relationship with the Mexican Consejo Mundial de Lucha Libre (CMLL) promotion, Bushi has held the CMLL World Welterweight Championship.

== Professional wrestling career ==
=== All Japan Pro Wrestling (2007–2008) ===
Tetsuya Shimizu trained in the AJPW Dojo under Animal Hamaguchi as well as receiving extra training by Kaz Hayashi and Keiji Muto for his professional wrestling debut. Upon his debut he adopted the ring name T28, inspired by the Japanese manga Tetsujin 28-go. Shimizu, as T28 wrestled his first match on March 12, 2007, losing to Nobukazu Hirai in the opening match of an All Japan Pro Wrestling (AJPW) show in Gunma, Japan. Only two months after making his debut, T28 participated in the "Tag Team Samurai! TV Cup Triple Arrow Tournament", teaming up with veterans Satoshi Kojima and Taiyō Kea. In the first round they defeated a team known as Grappler, Susumu, and Hanzo, before losing to Katsuhiko Nakajima, Kensuke Sasaki and Sanada in the second round. In February 2008, T28 teamed up with Kushida to participate in the U-30 Tag Team Tournament, a one night tournament that featured AJPW's top young wrestlers. The team defeated CJ Otis and Mototsugu Shimizu in the first round, Kaji Yamato and Taishi Takizawa in the second round and the team of Daichi Kakimoto and Manabu Soya in the final to win the U30 Tag Team tournament. The team would go on to compete in AJPW's 2008 Junior Tag League, the team ended up tied for last place with only four points for two victories and three losses. He also competed in the 2008 AJPW Junior League, earning three points for one win and one time limit draw. In late 2008 it was announced that T28 would undertake a "learning excursion" to Mexico to help him gain international experience, a tradition for many young Japanese wrestlers. He wrestled his last match for AJPW on September 19 before travelling to Mexico.

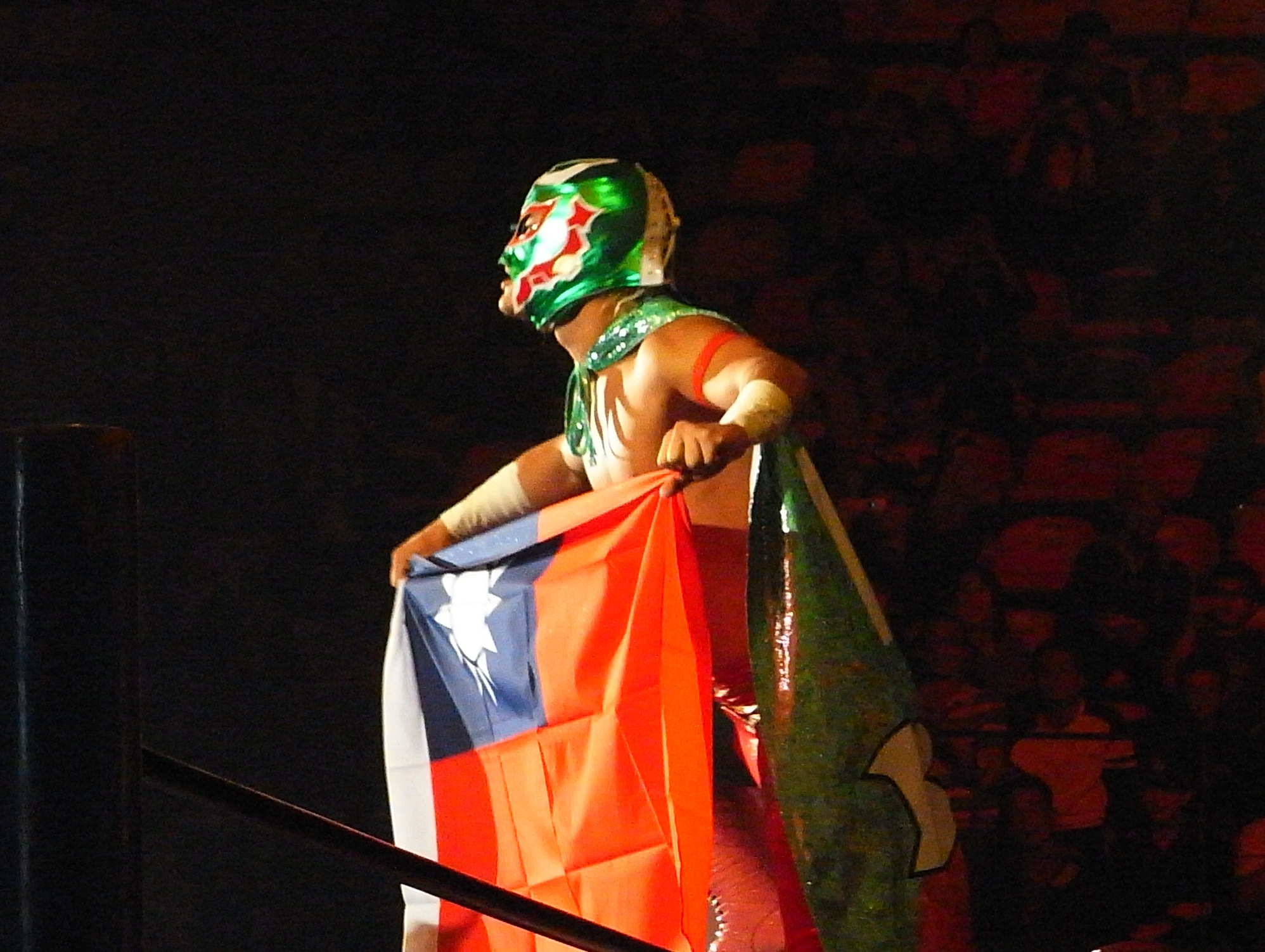
Bushi in November 2010

=== International Wrestling Revolution Group (2008–2010) ===
In Mexico, Tetsuya Shimizu began learning the lucha libre style under Skayde. On January 29, 2009, he made his debut for the Naucalpan, State of Mexico based International Wrestling Revolution Group (IWRG), working as a masked rudo (bad guy) character called Tetsuya. In only his second match in IWRG he defeated reigning IWRG Intercontinental Lightweight Champion Freelance, which earned him a chance at the title only 10 days after making his IWRG debut. Tetsuya defeated Freelance to win the title, in a match that also included Dr. Cerebro. His run with the title lasted for more than a month and did not feature any successful title defenses before he lost the belt to Zatura. He spent the next several months teaming with other heels for random trios matches. He participated in IWRG's 2009 Rey del Ring tournament but was eliminated as number 14 out of 30. Over the summer of 2009 he began wrestling as Tetsuya Bushi, or at times just Bushi after the Japanese term Bushido, the Samurai code. After losing a tag team match he was attacked by his partner Fantasma de la Opera and Tetsuya Bushi was turned technico (good guy). On November 11, 2009, Tetsuya Bushi became a two time IWRG Intercontinental Lightweight Champion as he defeated Avisman to win the title, becoming the only wrestler to hold the title two times up to that point. After the success of the title victory Bushi tasted the sting of defeat as he was beaten by Oficial 911 in a Lucha de Apuesta, mask vs. mask match and had to unmask. Traditionally foreign wrestlers who travel to Mexico to learn lose an Apuesta match and either unmask or have their hair shaved before their tour ends. Tetsuya Bushi's tour of Mexico ended in January 2010 when he lost the IWRG Intercontinental Lightweight Championship to Dr. Cerebro. After the match El Hijo del Diablo used a tombstone piledriver on Bushi, which in storyline terms injured Bushi, explaining his absence.

=== Return to AJPW (2010–2012) ===
When Shimizu returned to All Japan, he used the name Bushi instead of T28 and resumed wearing the mask he had lost to Oficial 911, since Japan are not subject to the strict mask rules of Mexico. After returning Bushi teamed with AJPW's top star Keiji Mutoh as well as luchador Super Crazy. The team with Super Crazy became a semi-regular feature, at times even as a six-man team with Kiyoshi who himself had recently returned from his own "learning excursion". On April 11, 2010, Bushi received his first shot at the World Junior Heavyweight Championship, but champion Kaz Hayashi successfully defended the title against Bushi in a very close match, a testament to the improvements he had made in Mexico He teamed up with Super Crazy to win the 2010 Junior Tag League, defeating Hiroshi Yamato and Shuji Kondo in the final. In August 2011, All Japan introduced a new character named Black Bushi, portrayed by Canadian Adam Filangeri, who started a rivalry with the original Bushi, imitating the famous rivalry between the Tiger Mask and Black Tiger characters.

=== New Japan Pro-Wrestling (2012–2026) ===
==== Early years and injury (2012–2015) ====
On April 16, 2012, New Japan Pro-Wrestling announced it had reached an agreement with AJPW, which would see Bushi switch promotions in what was referred to as a "one year rental transfer". Bushi debuted as a NJPW wrestler in the 2012 Best of the Super Juniors tournament, where he won three out of his eight round-robin stage matches and finished second to last in his block. On October 21, Bushi and Mexican wrestler Negro Casas entered the 2012 Super Jr. Tag Tournament as "Grupo Cibernetico". However, the team was eliminated from the tournament in the first round by Suzuki-gun (Taichi and Taka Michinoku). On November 15, Bushi participated in the NEVER Openweight Championship tournament, but was eliminated in his first round match by Kengo Mashimo. On January 18, 2013, New Japan and Bushi held a press conference to announce that he had signed a contract to make his move from All Japan permanent. On June 7, Mexican Consejo Mundial de Lucha Libre (CMLL) promotion, with which New Japan Pro-Wrestling had a working relationship, announced that Bushi, working under the ring name "Bushiroad", would start his first tour with the promotion the following week. In his Mexican return match on June 14, Bushiroad teamed with Guerrero Maya Jr. and Tritón to defeat Bobby Zavala, Namajague and Puma in a six-man tag team match. In an unusual role for Japanese wrestlers in CMLL, Bushiroad was positioned as a technico, leading to Okumura of La Fiebre Amarilla branding him a traitor for going against his own people. Bushi returned to New Japan on September 5. From May 30 to June 6, Bushi took part in the 2014 Best of the Super Juniors tournament, where he finished with a record of four wins and three losses, with a loss against Ricochet on the final day costing him a spot in the semifinals. On October 13 at King of Pro-Wrestling, Bushi unsuccessfully challenged the visiting Chase Owens for the National Wrestling Alliance (NWA) World Junior Heavyweight Championship. On December 19, Bushi suffered an epidural hematoma, cervical cord neurapraxia and a thoracic vertebrae fracture, which were estimated to sideline him for six months.

==== Los Ingobernables de Japón (2015–2025) ====
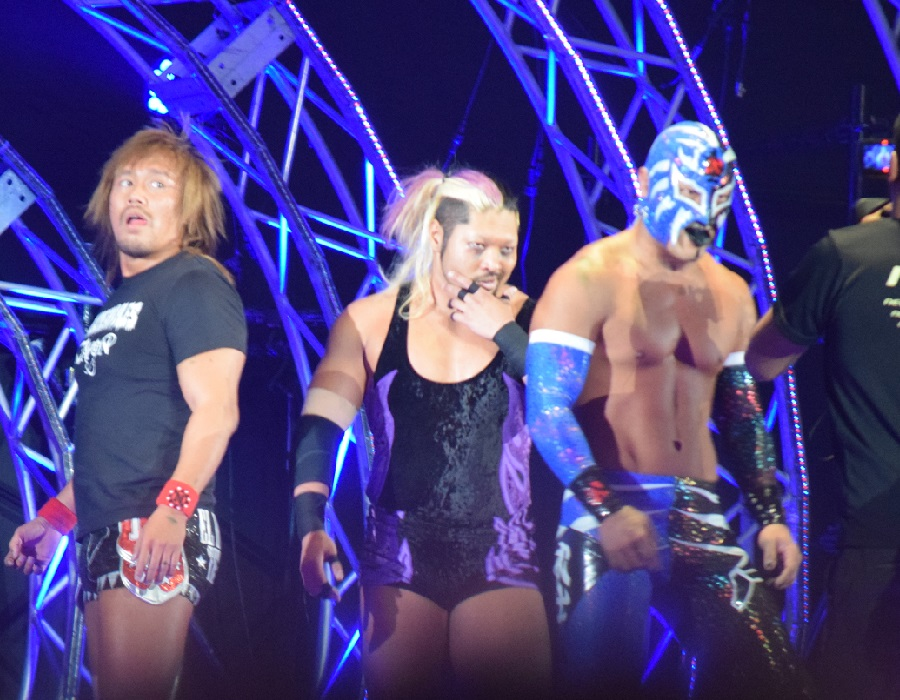
Bushi with Los Ingobernables de Japón in February 2016

Bushi was set to wrestle his return match on August 16, 2015, but the match had to be postponed, after he broke the orbital floor in his right eye while training. Bushi's comeback was postponed until November 21, 2015. However, on November 20, New Japan announced they had pulled Bushi from his return match due to being unable to get into contact with him. However, the following day this was revealed to be a storyline as Bushi accompanied Tetsuya Naito and Evil to their match, joining their villainous Los Ingobernables de Japón (L.I.J.) stable in the process. On December 9, Bushi attacked Máscara Dorada after he refused to join L.I.J., ripped off his mask and stole the CMLL World Welterweight Championship belt, setting up a future title match between the two. On December 19, Bushi defeated Dorada with help from Evil to become the new CMLL World Welterweight Champion.

On January 22, 2016, at Fantastica Mania 2016, Bushi lost the title back to Dorada. On February 14 at The New Beginning in Niigata, Bushi unsuccessfully challenged Kushida for the IWGP Junior Heavyweight Championship. In May, Bushi entered the 2016 Best of the Super Juniors. Though he failed to advance from his block with a record of four wins and three losses, he scored a big win over Kushida in his final match, eliminating the reigning IWGP Junior Heavyweight Champion from the tournament in the process. On July 20, Bushi entered the 2016 Super J-Cup, but was eliminated in his first round match by Yoshinobu Kanemaru. On September 17 at Destruction in Tokyo, Bushi defeated Kushida to win the IWGP Junior Heavyweight Championship for the first time. He lost the title back to Kushida on November 5 at Power Struggle.

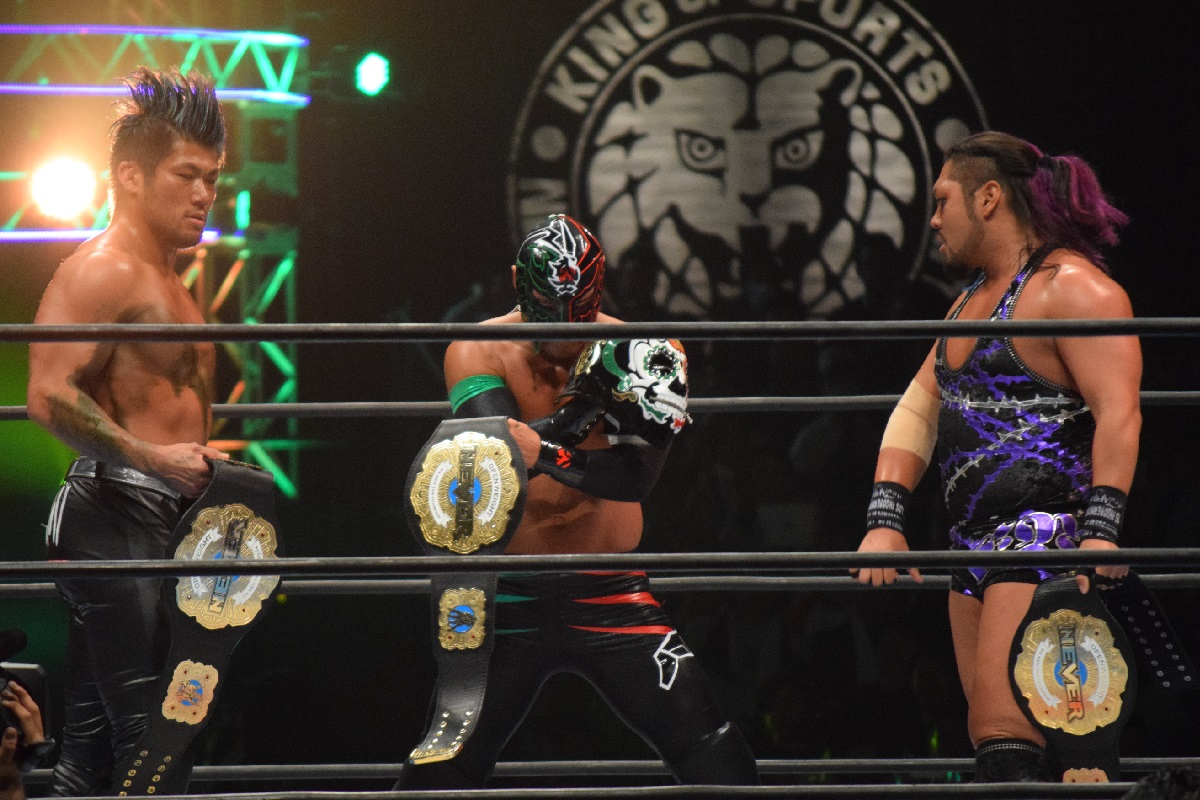
Bushi with Sanada and Evil as the NEVER Openweight 6-Man Tag Team Champions in February 2017

On January 4, 2017, at Wrestle Kingdom 11 in Tokyo Dome, Bushi, Evil and Sanada won a four-team gauntlet match to become the new NEVER Openweight 6-Man Tag Team Champions. They lost the title to Taguchi Japan (Hiroshi Tanahashi, Manabu Nakanishi and Ryusuke Taguchi) the next day, before regaining it on February 11 at The New Beginning in Osaka. They lost the title to Taguchi Japan (Tanahashi, Taguchi and Ricochet) in their second defense on April 4, before regaining it on May 3 at Wrestling Dontaku 2017. Bushi then entered the 2017 Best of the Super Juniors, where he finished with a record of four wins and three losses, same as block winner Kushida, but failed to advance to the final due to losing to Kushida in their head-to-head match. Kushida would win the tournament and the IWGP Junior Heavyweight Championship, and Bushi was his first challenger. Bushi unsuccessfully challenged for the belt on June 27. In late 2017, Bushi started teaming with L.I.J. stablemate Hiromu Takahashi in NJPW's junior tag team division, participating in the 2017 Super Junior Tag Tournament. They were eliminated in the semi-finals by eventual winners Roppongi 3K (Sho and Yoh). On December 17, Bushi, Evil and Sanada lost the NEVER Openweight 6-Man Tag Team Championship to Bullet Club's Bad Luck Fale, Tama Tonga and Tanga Loa in their fourth defense.

On January 4 at Wrestle Kingdom 12, Bushi competed in the New Japan Rumble to a losing effort. In May 2018, he entered the 2018 Best of the Super Juniors. He finished the tournament with three wins and four losses, failing to advance to the final. After Hiromu Takahashi was injured at the G1 Special in San Francisco, tournament for a vacated IWGP Junior Heavyweight Championship was announced. At Destruction in Kobe, in the first semifinal match, Bushi lost to Kushida. Bushi and the newest member of Los Ingobernables de Japón, Shingo Takagi, took part in 2018 Super Junior Tag Tournament. They qualified to the final, where they lost in a three-way tag team match to Roppongi 3K, also involving El Desperado and Yoshinobu Kanemaru. A rematch was set on Wrestle Kingdom 13, where they won the IWGP Junior Heavyweight Tag Team Championship. At the New Beginning In Sapporo, they retained their titles against Kanemaru and Desperado. They lost their titles in their second defense at NJPW's 47th anniversary against Roppongi 3K. Bushi would enter the 2019 Best of the Super Juniors with an improved and positive score of six wins and three losses, although still failing to make the final. After the G1 Climax, Takagi moved up to the heavyweight division. With Takahashi still injured, Bushi had no one to team with for the IWGP Junior Tag Team Championship or the forthcoming Super Junior Tag League.

On January 5, 2020, at Wrestle Kingdom 14, Bushi, Evil and Takagi defeated four other teams in a gauntlet match for the NEVER Openweight 6-Man Tag Team Championship, making both Bushi and Evil record-tying four time holders of the title. On February 6, the trio defended their belts against the Chaos trio of Hirooki Goto, Tomohiro Ishii and Robbie Eagles, with Bushi scoring the pinfall victory on Eagles with the MX (diving double knee facebreaker). Fifteen days later, the trio were again successful in defending their titles, defeating the Taguchi Japan trio of Toru Yano, Colt Cabana and Ryusuke Taguchi. Bushi again scored the win, this time on Taguchi with the Bushi roll (backslide with a bridge). The COVID-19 pandemic forced NJPW, after their show five days later, to cancel all further shows, and the upcoming 2020 New Japan Cup was cancelled. The pandemic also meant that NJPW was not able to fly in talent that were outside of Japan at the time, so the New Japan Cup featured junior heavyweight and 'young lion' wrestlers to make up numbers. This gave Bushi an opportunity to win the Cup, and in his first round match, he defeated Yoh, who injured his ACL in the process. Bushi went on to lose his second round match against Yoshi-Hashi. On August 1, NJPW vacated the NEVER Openweight 6-Man Tag Team Championship due to Evil having turned on Los Ingobernables de Japón during the final of the New Japan Cup and claiming he had "no interest" in defending the title. In November 2020, he entered the Best of the Super Juniors tournament. He finished the tournament with four wins and five losses, failing to advance to the final. On Night 1 of Wrestle Kingdom 15, Bushi competed in the New Japan Rumble, where he finished in the final four, along with Toru Yano, Bad Luck Fale and Chase Owens, therefore advancing to a four-way match on Night 2, for the KOPW Championship. The following night Bushi failed to win the title, which was won by Yano.

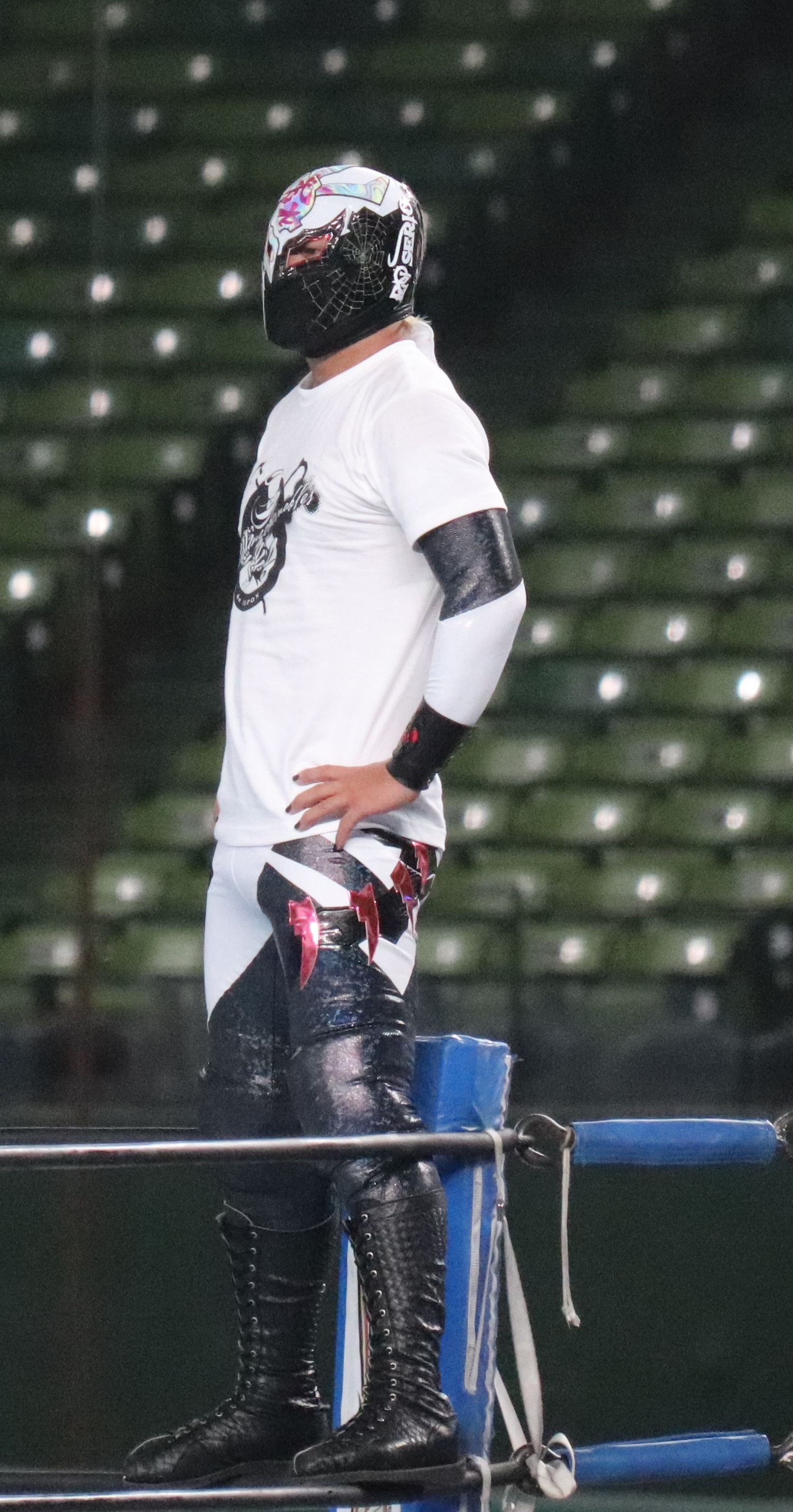
Bushi at Wrestle Grand Slam in MetLife Dome in September 2021

In February at Castle Attack, Bushi competed in a three-way match against El Desperado and El Phantasmo for the vacant IWGP Junior Heavyweight Championship, though the match was won by Desperado. In June, Bushi, Sanada and Naito failed to capture the NEVER Openweight 6-man tag-team championships from Chaos. In November, Bushi competed in the Best of the Super Juniors tournament, but finished with 10 points (5 wins and 6 losses), failing to advance to the finals. At Wrestle Kingdom 16, Bushi teamed with his L.I.J teammates against United Empire, losing on night one, but winning on night 2. On night 3, L.I.J defeated Pro Wrestling Noah's Kongo stable in a ten-man tag-team match. In March, Bushi competed in the New Japan Cup, but lost in the first round to Will Ospreay. In May, Bushi competed in the Best of the Super Juniors tournament, competing in the B Block. Bushi finished his tournament campaign with 8 points, failing to advance to the finals. In November, Bushi teamed with new LIJ stablemate, Titán, and the duo challenged Catch 2/2 (Francesco Akira and TJP) for the IWGP Junior Heavyweight Tag Team Championships, however the duo were unsuccessful in capturing the titles. Later in the month, the duo teamed in the Super Junior Tag League, finishing with 12 points, thus failing to advance to the finals.

On January 4 at Wrestle Kingdom 17, Bushi teamed with Tetsuya Naito and Sanada, losing to Shota Umino, Hiroshi Tanahashi and Bushi's trainer Keiji Muto, in Muto's NJPW final retirement match. Later in the month, at Night 2 of Wrestle Kingdom 17 in Yokohama Arena, Bushi lost to Pro Wrestling Noah's Tadasuke. In May, Bushi competed in the 2023 Best of the Super Juniors tournament, fighting in the B Block. Bushi scored just 4 points, thus finishing bottom of his block and failing to advance to the semi-finals.

On April 16, 2025, it was announced that NJPW had granted Bushi his release from the promotion and would be finishing up with NJPW at the Wrestling Dontaku series the next month. Bushi's final match as an NJPW talent took place at Wrestling Dontaku: Night 2 on May 4 where he teamed with Tetsuya Naito Shingo Takagi, and Hiromu Takahashi to defeat Shota Umino, Tomohiro Ishii and Just 4 Guys' Taichi and Taka Michinoku.

==== One night return (2026) ====
On January 4, 2026 at Wrestle Kingdom 20, Bushi, along with Naito, made a one night return to NJPW as part of Hiroshi Tanahashi's ceremony.

=== Independent circuit (2025–present) ===
On July 25, 2025, Bushi and Tetsuya Naito made their first post-NJPW appearance at Revolution Pro Wrestling (RevPro)'s event Summer Sizzler as Los Tranquilos de Japon, where they defeated Kieron Lacey and Mark Trew.

=== Pro Wrestling Noah (2026–present) ===
On January 1, 2026 at Pro Wrestling Noah's Noah The New Year 2026, Bushi and Tetsuya Naito as Los Tranquilos de Japon, defeated Maruken (Kenoh and Naomichi Marufuji) to win the GHC Tag Team Championship. On June 25 at Legacy Rise 2026: Night 2, Bushi and Naito lost their titles to Passionate Ratel's (Manabu Soya and Yuki Iino), ending their reign at 175 days and three successful defenses.

== Championships and accomplishments ==
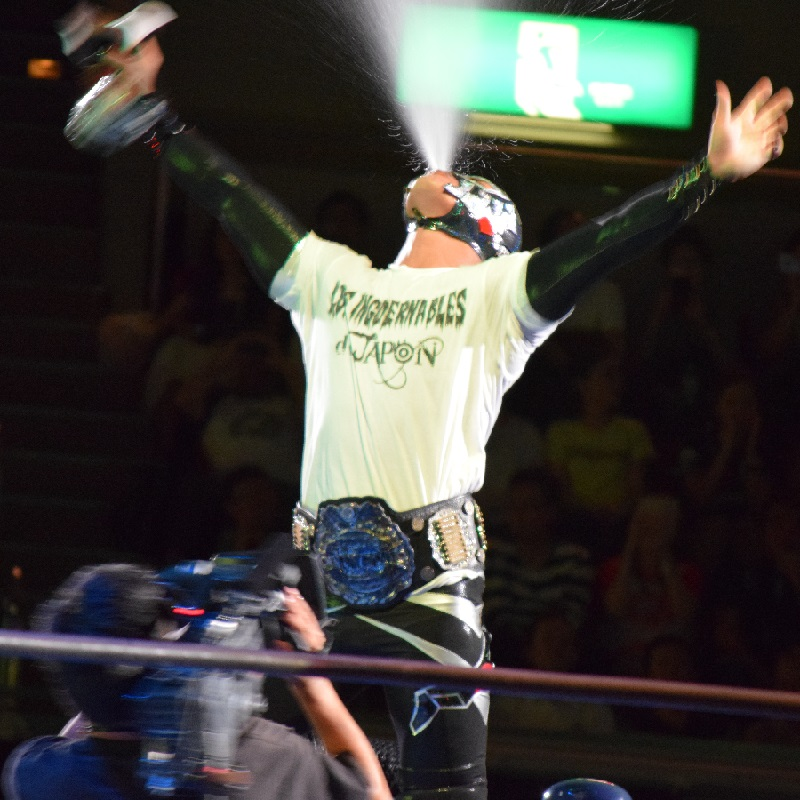
Bushi as the IWGP Junior Heavyweight Champion

- All Japan Pro Wrestling
  - AJPW Junior Tag League (2010) – with Super Crazy
  - AJPW U-30 Tag Team Tournament (2008) – with Kushida
- Consejo Mundial de Lucha Libre
  - CMLL World Welterweight Championship (1 time)
- International Wrestling Revolution Group
  - IWRG Intercontinental Lightweight Championship (2 times)
- New Japan Pro-Wrestling
  - IWGP Junior Heavyweight Championship (1 time)
  - IWGP Junior Heavyweight Tag Team Championship (1 time) – with Shingo Takagi
  - NEVER Openweight 6-Man Tag Team Championship (5 times) – with Evil and Sanada (3), Evil and Shingo Takagi (1), Yota Tsuji and Hiromu Takahashi (1)
  - New Japan Rambo (2021)
- Pro Wrestling Illustrated
  - Ranked No. 82 of the top 500 singles wrestlers in the PWI 500 in 2016
- Pro Wrestling Noah
  - GHC Tag Team Championship (1 time) – with Tetsuya Naito
- Wrestling Observer Newsletter
  - Best Gimmick (2017) as part of Los Ingobernables de Japón

== Luchas de Apuestas record ==
Winner (wager)	Loser (wager)	Location	Event	Date	Notes
Oficial 911 (mask)	Tetsuya Bushi (mask)	Naucalpan, Mexico State	IWRG show	December 3, 2009	
