= The New Beginning in Sapporo (2019) =

- Promotion: New Japan Pro-Wrestling
- Date: February 2-3, 2019
- City: Sapporo, Hokkaido, Japan
- Venue: Hokkaido Prefectural Sports Center
- Attendance: Night 1: 4,868; Night 2: 6,089

Event chronology
← Previous; Fantastica Mania 2019; The New Beginning USA	Next → Road to The New Beginning

The New Beginning chronology
← Previous; The New Beginning USA	Next → The New Beginning in Osaka (2019)

The New Beginning in Sapporo (2019) was a professional wrestling event promoted by New Japan Pro-Wrestling (NJPW). The event took place on February 2, and 3, 2019, in Sapporo, Hokkaido, at the Hokkaido Prefectural Sports Center.

== Storylines ==
The New Beginning in Sapporo featured eight professional wrestling matches for each night, which involved different wrestlers from pre-existing scripted feuds and storylines. Wrestlers portrayed villains, heroes, or less distinguishable characters in the scripted events that built tension and culminated in a wrestling match or series of matches.

== Results ==
=== Night 1 ===
No.	Results	Stipulations	Times
1	Ren Narita defeated Yuya Uemura	Singles match	9:45
2	Manabu Nakanishi and Toa Henare defeated Ayato Yoshida and Shota Umino	Tag team match	8:53
3	Hiroyoshi Tenzan and Tiger Mask defeated Suzuki-gun (Takashi Iizuka and Taka Michinoku) by disqualification	Tag team match	9:26
4	Taguchi Japan (Togi Makabe, Toru Yano, Tomoaki Honma and Ryusuke Taguchi) and Yoshi-Hashi defeated Bullet Club (Tama Tonga, Tanga Loa, Yujiro Takahashi, Chase Owens and Taiji Ishimori)	Ten-man tag team match	13:38
5	Suzuki-gun (Taichi, Yoshinobu Kanemaru and El Desperado) defeated Los Ingobernables de Japón (Tetsuya Naito, Bushi and Shingo Takagi)	Six-man tag team match	13:28
6	Minoru Suzuki defeated Sanada	Singles match	19:40
7	Evil defeated Zack Sabre Jr.	Singles match	22:01
8	Bullet Club (Jay White and Bad Luck Fale) defeated Hiroshi Tanahashi and Kazuchika Okada by submission	Tag team match	24:36

=== Night 2 ===
No.	Results	Stipulations	Times
1	Toa Henare defeated Yota Tsuji	Singles match	7:07
2	Manabu Nakanishi and Tiger Mask defeated Ayato Yoshida and Shota Umino	Tag team match	9:31
3	Hiroyoshi Tenzan and Ren Narita defeated Suzuki-gun (Takashi Iizuka and Taka Michinoku) by disqualification	Tag team match	9:47
4	Taguchi Japan (Togi Makabe, Toru Yano, Tomoaki Honma and Ryusuke Taguchi) defeated Bullet Club (Tama Tonga, Tanga Loa, Yujiro Takahashi and Taiji Ishimori)	Eight-man tag team match	14:15
5	Bullet Club (Jay White, Bad Luck Fale and Chase Owens) defeated Hiroshi Tanahashi and Chaos (Kazuchika Okada and Yoshi-Hashi) by submission	Six-man tag team match	17:57
6	Los Ingobernables de Japón (Bushi and Shingo Takagi) (c) defeated Suzuki-gun (Yoshinobu Kanemaru and El Desperado)	Tag team match for the IWGP Junior Heavyweight Tag Team Championship	18:04
7	Los Ingobernables de Japón (Evil and Sanada) (c) defeated Suzuki-gun (Minoru Suzuki and Zack Sabre Jr.)	Tag team match for the IWGP Tag Team Championship	16:52
8	Tetsuya Naito (c) defeated Taichi	Singles match for the IWGP Intercontinental Championship	21:31
(c) / – the champion(s) heading into the match
