= Honor Rising: Japan 2018 =

2018 professional wrestling event

- Promotion(s): New Japan Pro-Wrestling; Ring of Honor
- Date: February 23-24, 2018
- City: Tokyo, Japan
- Venue: Korakuen Hall
- Attendance: 1,700 (February 23); 1,714 (February 24)

Event chronology
← Previous (ROH) Honor Reigns Supreme (NJPW) The New Beginning in Osaka	Next → (ROH) Manhattan Mayhem (NJPW) 46th Anniversary Show; Strong Style Evolved

Honor Rising: Japan chronology
← Previous; 2017	Next → 2019

Honor Rising: Japan 2018 was a two-day professional wrestling livestreaming "supershow" event co-produced by the Japanese New Japan Pro-Wrestling (NJPW) and American Ring of Honor (ROH) promotions. The shows took place on February 23 and 24, 2018, at Korakuen Hall in Tokyo, Japan. These shows were streamed live on NJPW World.

Continuing the partnership between NJPW and ROH, these were the second annual Honor Rising: Japan shows co-produced by the two promotions.

== Production ==
=== Storylines ===
Other on-screen personnel
Role:	Name:
Commentators	Chris Charlton (English-language announcer)
Commentators	Don Callis (English-language announcer)
Commentators	Kevin Kelly (English-language announcer)
Ring announcers	Makoto Abe
Referees	Kenta Sato
Referees	Marty Asami
Referees	Red Shoes Unno
Referees	Tiger Hattori

Honor Rising: Japan 2018 featured professional wrestling matches, involving different wrestlers from pre-existing scripted feuds, plots, and storylines that played out on ROH's and NJPW's television programs. Wrestlers portrayed villains or heroes as they followed a series of events that built tension and culminated in a wrestling match or series of matches.

== Results ==
February 23

No.	Results	Stipulations	Times
1	Bullet Club (Bad Luck Fale and Yujiro Takahashi) defeated Katsuya Kitamura and Toa Henare	Tag team match	7:20
2	Delirious, Jushin Thunder Liger and Cheeseburger defeated Bullet Club (Hikuleo, Tama Tonga and Tanga Roa)	Six-man tag team match	7:08
3	The Young Bucks (Matt Jackson and Nick Jackson) defeated David Finlay and Juice Robinson	Tag Team match	12:05
4	Flip Gordon defeated Kushida and Hiromu Takahashi	Three-way match	12:48
5	Chaos (Yoshi-Hashi, Chuckie T. and Jay White) defeated Dalton Castle, Ryusuke Taguchi and Jay Lethal	Six-man tag team match	10:10
6	Hirooki Goto (c) defeated Beer City Bruiser	Singles match for the NEVER Openweight Championship	13:38
7	Bullet Club (Cody, Hangman Page and Marty Scurll) defeated The Elite (Kota Ibushi, Kenny Omega and Chase Owens)	Six-man tag team match	20:30
(c) / – the champion(s) heading into the match

February 24

No.	Results	Stipulations	Times
1	Beer City Bruiser defeated Toa Henare	Singles match	4:25
2	David Finlay, Juice Robinson and Jay Lethal defeated Bullet Club (Hikuleo, Chase Owens and Yujiro Takahashi)	Six-man tag team match	6:35
3	Los Ingobernables de Japón (Bushi and Hiromu Takahashi) defeated Ryusuke Taguchi and Flip Gordon	Tag team match	10:17
4	Bullet Club (Bad Luck Fale, Tama Tonga and Tanga Loa) (c) defeated Delirious, Jushin Thunder Liger and Cheeseburger	Six-man tag team match for the NEVER Openweight 6-Man Tag Team Championship	9:16
5	Bullet Club (Matt Jackson, Nick Jackson and Hangman Page) defeated Chaos (Yoshi-Hashi, Chuckie T. and Jay White)	Six-man tag team match	12:35
6	Dalton Castle (c) defeated Beretta and Beer City Bruiser	Three-way match for the ROH World Championship	16:00
7	Golden☆Lovers (Kota Ibushi and Kenny Omega) defeated Bullet Club (Cody and Marty Scurll)	Tag Team match	20:15
(c) / – the champion(s) heading into the match
