= Honor Rising: Japan 2017 =

2017 Ring of Honor and New Japan Pro-Wrestling event

- Promotional poster featuring both NJPW and ROH wrestlers
- Promotion(s): New Japan Pro-Wrestling; Ring of Honor
- Date: February 26-27, 2017
- City: Tokyo, Japan
- Venue: Korakuen Hall
- Attendance: 1,636 (February 26); 1,271 (February 27)

Event chronology
← Previous (ROH) Final Battle / (NJPW) The New Beginning in Osaka	Next → (ROH) 15th Anniversary Show / (NJPW) New Japan Cup Final; Sakura Genesis 2017

Honor Rising: Japan chronology
← Previous; 2016	Next → 2018

Honor Rising: Japan 2017 was a two-day professional wrestling "supershow" event co-produced by the Japanese New Japan Pro-Wrestling (NJPW) and American Ring of Honor (ROH) promotions. The shows took place on February 26 and 27, 2017, at Korakuen Hall in Tokyo, Japan.

Continuing the partnership between NJPW and ROH, these were the second annual Honor Rising: Japan shows co-produced by NJPW and ROH.

== Production ==
Other on-screen personnel
Role:	Name:
Commentators	Chris Charlton (English-language announcer)
Commentators	Don Callis (English-language announcer)
Commentators	Kevin Kelly (English-language announcer)
Ring announcers	Makoto Abe
Referees	Kenta Sato
Referees	Marty Asami
Referees	Red Shoes Unno
Referees	Tiger Hattori

=== Background ===
Honor Rising: Japan 2017 was officially announced by New Japan Pro-Wrestling (NJPW) on November 29, 2016. On February 3, 2017, NJPW announced the ROH wrestlers taking part in the events; ROH World Champion Adam Cole, ROH World Tag Team Champions The Young Bucks (Matt Jackson and Nick Jackson), Briscoe Brothers (Jay Briscoe and Mark Briscoe), Dalton Castle, Delirious, Hangman Page, Jay Lethal, Punisher Martinez^{*}, Silas Young and War Machine (Hanson and Raymond Rowe). For Martinez and Young, the shows would mark their first NJPW appearances. Also announced for the events were Cody and Kenny Omega, the former making his first NJPW appearance since Wrestle Kingdom 11 in Tokyo Dome and the latter making his return to NJPW after a brief hiatus, which started on January 5, 2017. NJPW wrestlers announced for the tour included Bad Luck Fale, Juice Robinson, Tama Tonga, Tanga Loa and Will Ospreay.

Cards and the rest of the NJPW participants for the shows were released on February 13. The shows were set to feature three title matches. On the first show, Los Ingobernables de Japón (Bushi, Evil and Sanada) would defend the NEVER Openweight 6-Man Tag Team Championship against Delirious, Jyushin Thunder Liger and Tiger Mask. The second show would see Hirooki Goto defend the NEVER Openweight Championship against Punisher Martinez, while Adam Cole would defend the ROH World Championship against Yoshi-Hashi. The match between Cole and Yoshi-Hashi had been set up at an NJPW show on January 5, 2017, when Yoshi-Hashi pinned Cole in a six-man tag team match.

The shows would air worldwide through NJPW's internet streaming site, NJPW World, with English commentary provided by Kevin Kelly and Rocky Romero.

== Results ==
February 26

No.	Results	Stipulations	Times
1	David Finlay, Juice Robinson and Kushida defeated Gedo, Jado and Silas Young	Six-man tag team match	10:00
2	Los Ingobernables de Japón (Bushi, Evil and Sanada) (c) defeated Delirious, Jyushin Thunder Liger and Tiger Mask	Six-man tag team match for the NEVER Openweight 6-Man Tag Team Championship	10:34
3	Chaos (Hirooki Goto, Kazuchika Okada, Will Ospreay and Yoshi-Hashi) defeated Bullet Club (Bad Luck Fale, Tama Tonga, Tanga Loa and Yujiro Takahashi)	Eight-man tag team match	11:05
4	War Machine (Hanson and Raymond Rowe) defeated The Young Bucks (Matt Jackson and Nick Jackson)	Tag team match	12:05
5	Hiromu Takahashi, Punisher Martinez and Tetsuya Naito defeated Dalton Castle, Hiroshi Tanahashi and Ryusuke Taguchi	Six-man tag team match	11:46
6	Jay Lethal and Katsuyori Shibata defeated Bullet Club (Cody and Hangman Page)	Tag team match	14:06
7	Bullet Club (Adam Cole and Kenny Omega) defeated Briscoe Brothers (Jay Briscoe and Mark Briscoe)	Tag team match	22:00
(c) / – the champion(s) heading into the match

February 27

No.	Results	Stipulations	Times
1	Jado and Silas Young defeated David Finlay and Kushida	Tag team match	08:16
2	Los Ingobernables de Japón (Bushi, Evil, Hiromu Takahashi, Sanada and Tetsuya Naito) defeated Dalton Castle (with Katsuya Kitamura and Tomoyuki Oka), Delirious, Jyushin Thunder Liger, Ryusuke Taguchi and Tiger Mask	Ten-man tag team match	10:32
3	War Machine (Hanson and Raymond Rowe) defeated Guerrillas of Destiny (Tama Tonga and Tanga Loa)	Tag team match	09:21
4	Bullet Club (Bad Luck Fale, Hangman Page and Yujiro Takahashi) defeated Hiroshi Tanahashi, Jay Lethal and Juice Robinson	Six-man tag team match	09:10
5	Hirooki Goto (c) defeated Punisher Martinez	Singles match for the NEVER Openweight Championship	10:49
6	Adam Cole (c) defeated Yoshi-Hashi	Singles match for the ROH World Championship	16:28
7	Bullet Club (Cody, Kenny Omega, Matt Jackson and Nick Jackson) defeated Chaos (Jay Briscoe, Kazuchika Okada, Mark Briscoe and Will Ospreay)	Eight-man tag team match	20:16
(c) / – the champion(s) heading into the match

== Notes ==
- In their coverage of the event, NJPW refers to Martinez as "Punisher Martinez", while ROH uses the name "Punishment Martinez".
