= Honor Rising: Japan 2016 =

Wrestling event

- Promotional poster for the event, featuring both NJPW and ROH wrestlers
- Promotion(s): New Japan Pro-Wrestling; Ring of Honor
- Date: February 19-20, 2016
- City: Tokyo, Japan
- Venue: Korakuen Hall
- Attendance: 1,367 (February 19); 1,718 (February 20)

Event chronology
← Previous (NJPW) The New Beginning in Niigata / (ROH) Final Battle	Next → (NJPW) Lion's Gate Project 1 / (ROH) 14th Anniversary Show

Honor Rising: Japan chronology
← Previous; First	Next → 2017

Honor Rising: Japan 2016 was a two-day professional wrestling "supershow" event co-produced by the Japanese New Japan Pro-Wrestling (NJPW) and American Ring of Honor (ROH) promotions. The event took place on February 19 and 20, 2016, at Korakuen Hall in Tokyo, Japan. Both shows aired live through NJPW's internet streaming site, NJPW World. Matches from the shows also began airing on Ring of Honor Wrestling in April 2016.

Continuing the partnership between NJPW and ROH, these were the first co-produced shows between the two promotions to take place in Japan. In 2014 and 2015, the two held joint shows, entitled Global Wars and War of the Worlds, in Canada and the United States.

== Production ==
Other on-screen personnel
Role:	Name:
Commentators	Chris Charlton (English-language announcer)
Commentators	Don Callis (English-language announcer)
Commentators	Kevin Kelly (English-language announcer)
Ring announcers	Makoto Abe
Referees	Kenta Sato
Referees	Marty Asami
Referees	Red Shoes Unno
Referees	Tiger Hattori

=== Background ===
On August 21, 2015, at a Ring of Honor (ROH) show in Philadelphia, Pennsylvania, ROH's chief operating officer Joe Koff, ambassador Cary Silkin and on-screen authority figure Nigel McGuinness were joined by New Japan Pro-Wrestling (NJPW) chairman Naoki Sugabayashi and referee Tiger Hattori for an announcement about the continuation of a working relationship between the two promotions. The relationship originally started in 2014 with the Global Wars and War of the Worlds shows, co-produced between the two promotions in May, which were followed by War of the Worlds '15 and Global Wars '15 in May 2015. The relationship also included NJPW wrestlers making sporadic appearances in ROH and vice versa. It was announced that in 2016, the two promotions would hold joint shows in Japan in February and in North America in May. On November 19, 2015, ROH announced that the Japanese shows would be held on February 19 and 20 in Tokyo's Korakuen Hall. These would mark ROH's first shows in Japan since 2008, when they held shows in Tokyo as part of their then relationships with both Dragon Gate and Pro Wrestling Noah. On December 8, NJPW announced the name of the shows as "Honor Rising: Japan 2016".

On January 30, 2016, NJPW announced the eleven ROH wrestlers taking part in the event; Adam Cole, Bobby Fish, Dalton Castle, Delirious, Jay Briscoe, Jay Lethal, Kyle O'Reilly, Mark Briscoe, Michael Elgin, Moose and Roderick Strong. It was also reported that Doc Gallows and Karl Anderson would take part in the event, which mark their final NJPW appearances before leaving the promotion for WWE. On February 12, ROH announced that Adam Cole would not be able to make the shows due to "personal family issues" and replaced him with Frankie Kazarian, and also added Matt Sydal and The Young Bucks (Matt Jackson and Nick Jackson), who were regulars for both ROH and NJPW.

NJPW released the cards for the shows on February 15. Both shows would feature eight matches each with three of them being contested for championships. The February 19 show would be main evented by Roderick Strong defending the ROH World Television Championship against Tomohiro Ishii. The February 20 show would feature Jay Briscoe, Mark Briscoe and Toru Yano defending the NEVER Openweight 6-Man Tag Team Championship against the Bullet Club trio of Kenny Omega and The Young Bucks, while the main event saw Jay Lethal defend the ROH World Championship against Tomoaki Honma.

== Results ==
February 19

No.	Results	Stipulations	Times
1	Jyushin Thunder Liger and Matt Sydal defeated Dalton Castle (with Brandon Tate and Brent Tate) and Ryusuke Taguchi	Tag team match	08:20
2	Delirious defeated Gedo	Singles match	07:53
3	Kushida defeated Frankie Kazarian	Singles match	09:47
4	Hiroshi Tanahashi, Michael Elgin, Moose and Tomoaki Honma defeated Bullet Club (Bad Luck Fale, Cody Hall, Tama Tonga and Yujiro Takahashi)	Eight-man tag team match	11:38
5	The Elite (Kenny Omega, Matt Jackson and Nick Jackson) defeated Bobby Fish, Katsuyori Shibata and Kyle O'Reilly	Six-man tag team match	10:16
6	The Briscoes (Jay Briscoe and Mark Briscoe) defeated Bullet Club (Doc Gallows and Karl Anderson)	Tag team match	08:23
7	Jay Lethal (with Truth Martini) and Tetsuya Naito (with Bushi and Evil) defeated Chaos (Kazuchika Okada and Yoshi-Hashi) (with Gedo)	Tag team match	12:56
8	Tomohiro Ishii defeated Roderick Strong (c)	Singles match for the ROH World Television Championship	20:07
(c) / – the champion(s) heading into the match

February 20

No.	Results	Stipulations	Times
1	Jay White defeated David Finlay	Singles match	07:58
2	Jyushin Thunder Liger and Matt Sydal defeated Delirious and Gedo	Tag team match	07:21
3	Dalton Castle (with the Boys) defeated Frankie Kazarian	Singles match	11:07
4	Bobby Fish, Hirooki Goto, Katsuyori Shibata and Kyle O'Reilly defeated Bullet Club (Bad Luck Fale, Doc Gallows, Karl Anderson and Tama Tonga)	Eight-man tag team match	10:22
5	Kushida and Moose defeated Los Ingobernables de Japón (Bushi and Tetsuya Naito) (with Evil)	Tag team match	08:21
6	Hiroshi Tanahashi, Michael Elgin and Roderick Strong defeated Chaos (Kazuchika Okada, Tomohiro Ishii and Yoshi-Hashi) (with Gedo)	Six-man tag team match	15:47
7	The Elite (Kenny Omega, Matt Jackson and Nick Jackson) (with Cody Hall) defeated Chaos (Jay Briscoe, Mark Briscoe and Toru Yano) (c)	Six-man tag team match for the NEVER Openweight 6-Man Tag Team Championship	12:55
8	Jay Lethal (c) (with Truth Martini) defeated Tomoaki Honma	Singles match for the ROH World Championship	15:32
(c) / – the champion(s) heading into the match
