= Honor Rising: Japan 2019 =

2019 Ring of Honor and New Japan Pro-Wrestling event

- Promotion(s): New Japan Pro-Wrestling; Ring of Honor
- Date: February 22-23, 2019
- City: Tokyo, Japan
- Venue: Korakuen Hall

Event chronology
← Previous (NJPW) New Japan Road; The New Beginning in Osaka (ROH) Bound By Honor	Next → (NJPW) New Japan Road (ROH) 17th Anniversary Show (NJPW/ROH) G1 Supercard

Honor Rising: Japan chronology
← Previous; 2018	Next → —

Honor Rising: Japan 2019 was a two-day professional wrestling supershow event co-produced by the Japanese New Japan Pro-Wrestling (NJPW) and the American Ring of Honor (ROH) promotions. The shows took place on February 22 and 23, 2019, at the Korakuen Hall in Tokyo, Japan and were streamed live on NJPW World.

Continuing the partnership between NJPW and ROH, these were the final Honor Rising: Japan shows.

== Production ==
=== Storylines ===
Other on-screen personnel
Role:	Name:
Commentators	Chris Charlton (English-language announcer)
Commentators	Don Callis (English-language announcer)
Commentators	Kevin Kelly (English-language announcer)
Ring announcers	Makoto Abe
Referees	Kenta Sato
Referees	Marty Asami
Referees	Red Shoes Unno
Referees	Tiger Hattori

Honor Rising: Japan 2019 will feature professional wrestling matches, involving different wrestlers from pre-existing scripted feuds, plots and storylines that play out on ROH's and NJPW's television programs. Wrestlers portray villains or heroes as they follow a series of events that build tension and culminate in a wrestling match or series of matches.

== Results ==
=== Night 1 ===
No.	Results	Stipulations	Times
1	Marty Scurll defeated Ren Narita by submission	Singles match	11:33
2	Zack Sabre Jr. defeated Shota Umino by submission	Singles match	13:56
3	Jyushin Thunder Liger and Jonathan Gresham defeated Bullet Club (Taiji Ishimori and Robbie Eagles)	Tag team match	5:27
4	LifeBlood (Juice Robinson and David Finlay), Tomoaki Honma and Toa Henare defeated The Briscoe Brothers (Jay Briscoe and Mark Briscoe) and Guerrillas of Destiny (Tama Tonga and Tanga Loa)	Eight-man tag team match	12:14
5	Taguchi Japan (Togi Makabe, Toru Yano and Ryusuke Taguchi) (c) defeated Colt Cabana, Delirious and Cheeseburger	Six-man tag team match for the NEVER Openweight 6-Man Tag Team Championship	10:16
6	Will Ospreay (c) defeated Dalton Castle	Singles match for the NEVER Openweight Championship	17:30
7	Jeff Cobb (c) defeated Hirooki Goto	Singles match for the ROH World Television Championship	13:52
8	Hiroshi Tanahashi, Kazuchika Okada and Jay Lethal defeated The Kingdom (Matt Taven, T. K. O'Ryan and Vinny Marseglia)	Six-man tag team match	14:10
(c) / – the champion(s) heading into the match

=== Night 2 ===
No.	Results	Stipulations	Times
1	Jonathan Gresham and Toa Henare defeated Suzuki-gun (Zack Sabre Jr. and Taka Michinoku) by submission	Tag team match	12:20
2	Marty Scurll defeated Robbie Eagles by submission	Singles match	8:55
3	Toru Yano and Colt Cabana defeated Delirious and Cheeseburger	Tag team match	10:09
4	Chaos (Hirooki Goto and Will Ospreay) defeated Jeff Cobb and Dalton Castle	Tag team match	11:45
5	Los Ingobernables de Japón (Tetsuya Naito and Shingo Takagi) defeated The Kingdom (Matt Taven and Vinny Marseglia)	Tag team match	11:50
6	Jay Lethal (c) defeated T. K. O'Ryan	Singles match for the ROH World Championship	10:52
7	Guerrillas of Destiny (Tama Tonga and Tanga Loa) defeated Los Ingobernables de Japón (Evil and Sanada) (c)	Tag team match for the IWGP Tag Team Championship	20:26
8	The Briscoe Brothers (Jay Briscoe and Mark Briscoe) (c) defeated FinJuice (Juice Robinson and David Finlay)	Tag team match for the ROH World Tag Team Championship	17:13
(c) / – the champion(s) heading into the match

== See also ==
- 2019 in professional wrestling
