= The New Beginning in Osaka (2019) =

2019 New Japan Pro-Wrestling event

- Promotion: New Japan Pro-Wrestling
- Date: February 11, 2019
- City: Osaka, Osaka, Japan
- Venue: Osaka Prefectural Gymnasium
- Attendance: 5,570

Event chronology
← Previous; Road to The New Beginning	Next → New Japan Road: Takashi Iizuka Retirement Show; Honor Rising: Japan 2019

The New Beginning chronology
← Previous; Sapporo (2019)	Next → USA (2020)

The New Beginning in Osaka (2019) is a professional wrestling event promoted by New Japan Pro-Wrestling (NJPW). The event took place on February 11, 2019, in Osaka, Osaka, at the Osaka Prefectural Gymnasium and featured eight matches, two of which were contested for championships.

In the main event, Hiroshi Tanahashi defended the IWGP Heavyweight Championship against Jay White. This was the seventeenth event under the New Beginning name, and the seventh to take place in Osaka.

== Storylines ==
The New Beginning in Osaka featured eight professional wrestling matches, which involved different wrestlers from pre-existing scripted feuds and storylines. The final five matches on the card feature Chaos and Main Unit wrestlers taking on Bullet Club wrestlers in singles & tag team matches. Wrestlers portray villains, heroes, or less distinguishable characters in the scripted events that build tension and culminate in a wrestling match or series of matches.

At Power Struggle (2017), Jay White made his return to NJPW under his new alias "Switchblade" and attacked Hiroshi Tanahashi challenging him for his IWGP Intercontinental Championship at Wrestle Kingdom 12, which Tanahashi won. After Wrestle Kingdom, Tanahashi would struggle in the beginning half of 2018 losing his Intercontinental Title to Minoru Suzuki at The New Beginning in Sapporo (2018), losing to Zack Sabre Jr. in the New Japan Cup final, and losing to Kazuchika Okada in an IWGP Heavyweight Championship match at Wrestling Dontaku 2018 which meant that Okada had broken Tanahashi's record of 11 straight IWGP Heavyweight Title defenses. However, White would triumph in his beginning half of 2018 joining Chaos and beating Kenny Omega at The New Beginning in Sapporo winning the IWGP United States Championship. On Night 3 of the G1 Climax, White would beat Tanahashi (being the only person to do so in the tournament). Tanahashi would end up winning the G1 beating Kota Ibushi in the final. At Destruction in Kobe, Tanahashi would successfully defend his Tokyo Dome IWGP Heavyweight Title challenge rights certificate against Okada. After the match White would attack Tanahashi and Okada, turning on Chaos and aligning himself with Okada's former manager Gedo. At King of Pro-Wrestling (2018), Tanahashi would successfully defend his challenge rights certificate against White, after the match White would join Bullet Club along with Gedo and Jado. At Road to Power Struggle, Tanahashi would join forces with Okada to combat White, dubbing themselves as the "Dream Team" they would lose all seven matches they had against White and Bullet Club over the course of the World Tag League (NJPW). At Wrestle Kingdom 13, White would defeat Okada and Tanahashi would beat Omega winning the IWGP Heavyweight Title. At New Year Dash!!, White would challenge Tanahashi for the IWGP Title for The New Beginning in Osaka, at The New beginning in Sapporo White would make Tanahashi tap out with his new finisher the T.T.O. (Tanahashi Tapped Out).

== Results ==
No.	Results	Stipulations	Times
1	Tencozy (Hiroyoshi Tenzan and Satoshi Kojima) and Jyushin Thunder Liger defeated Suzuki-gun (Minoru Suzuki, Takashi Iizuka and Taka Michinoku) by disqualification	Six-man tag team match	12:56
2	Los Ingobernables de Japón (Evil and Sanada) defeated Shota Umino and Ayato Yoshida	Tag team match	10:08
3	Los Ingobernables de Japón (Tetsuya Naito, Bushi and Shingo Takagi) defeated Suzuki-gun (Taichi, Yoshinobu Kanemaru and El Desperado)	Six-man tag team match	11:02
4	Bullet Club (Yujiro Takahashi and Chase Owens) defeated Tomoaki Honma and Yoshi-Hashi	Tag team match	9:38
5	Guerrillas of Destiny (Tama Tonga and Tanga Loa) (with Jado) defeated The Most Violent Players (Togi Makabe and Toru Yano)	Tag team match	9:44
6	Taiji Ishimori (c) defeated Ryusuke Taguchi	Singles match for the IWGP Junior Heavyweight Championship	16:10
7	Kazuchika Okada defeated Bad Luck Fale (with Chase Owens and Yujiro Takahashi)	Singles match	18:10
8	Jay White (with Gedo) defeated Hiroshi Tanahashi (c)	Singles match for the IWGP Heavyweight Championship	30:28
(c) / – the champion(s) heading into the match
