= Teruo Takahashi =

Japanese wrestling referee

- Born: Teruo Takahashi; January 24, 1941 (age 85)
- Other name: Mr. Takahashi
- Occupations: Professional wrestling referee and writer

Teruo Takahashi (高橋 輝男, Takahashi Teruo; born January 24, 1941, in Yokohama, Kanagawa) is a Japanese professional wrestling referee and writer, as well as an occasional wrestler. He is famous for his career in New Japan Pro-Wrestling, where he was also known by his ring name Mr. Takahashi, and for his post-retirement writing work, where he gained controversy for his autobiographical statements and books detailing the inner side of the business.

== Biography ==
After a decorated career in judo and powerlifting, Takahashi became a professional wrestler in Toshio Yamaguchi's troupe in 1963. Later, in 1972, he joined New Japan Pro-Wrestling by mediation of his childhood friend Kotetsu Yamamoto. He worked mainly as a referee for the company, certified as such by National Wrestling Alliance, and acted too as a booker, a column writer and a producer for Asahi TV's World Pro Wrestling show. In 1990, Takahashi left his place and most of his functions to Tiger Hattori, and retired from professional wrestling eight years later. He became a physical education teacher and a writer.

== Selected works ==
=== Non-fiction ===
- (1998) How to achieve the dream as a pro wrestler (プロレスラーをめざして夢を勝ちとる方法, Puroresurā o mezashite yume o kachi toru hōhō) ISBN 4380982041
- (1998) Pro wrestling, the truth at close range: Ins and outs only referees know (プロレス、至近距離の真実: レフェリーだけが知っている表と裏, Puroresu, shikin kyori no shinjitsu: Referī dake ga shitte iru hyō to ura) ISBN 4062094878
- (2001) Blood magic's strongest acting (流血の魔術 最強の演技, Ryūketsu no majutsu saikyō no engi) ISBN 4062567369
- (2002) Matchmaker: pro wrestling attracts because it is entertainment (マッチメイカー: プロレスはエンターティメントだから面白い, Matchimeikā: Puroresu wa entātimentodakara omoshiroi) ISBN 4915939294
- (2010) Blood magic: professional wrestling is proud entertainment (流血の魔術: プロレスは誇るべきエンターテインメント, Ryūketsu no majutsu: Puroresu wa hokorubeki entāteinmento) ISBN 9784062165167
- (2018) Knowing the disappointing legend of pro wrestling (知らなきゃよかった プロレス界の残念な伝説, Shiranakya yokatta puroresu-kai no zan'nen'na densetsu) ISBN 9784800289216

=== Fiction ===
- (2004) Tokyo Dangerous Boy Vol.1: The rebellious cement match (東京デンジャラス・ボーイ〈Vol.1〉反逆のセメントマッチ, Tōkyō denjarasu bōi〈Vol. 1〉Hangyaku no sementomatchi) ISBN 9784915939372
- (2005) Double Cross: Tokyo Dangerous Boy Vol.2 (ダブルクロス：東京デンジャラス・ボーイ〈Vol.2〉, Daburu kurosu: Tōkyō denjarasu bōi 〈Vol. 2〉) ISBN 4062569418
- (2005) Coming Out: Tokyo Dangerous Boy Vol.2 (カミングアウト：東京デンジャラス・ボーイ〈Vol.3〉, Kaminguauto: Tōkyō denjarasu bōi 〈Vol. 3〉) ISBN 4062569507
