= Honor Rising: Japan =

- Promotions: New Japan Pro-Wrestling; Ring of Honor
- First event: Honor Rising: Japan 2016
- Last event: Honor Rising: Japan 2019

Honor Rising: Japan was a professional wrestling event co-promoted by the Japanese New Japan Pro-Wrestling (NJPW) and American Ring of Honor (ROH) promotions. The event was held annually from 2016 to 2019, taking place in Japan (as opposed to the Global Wars and War of the Worlds series, which the two promotions co-promote in North America).

== Events ==
#	Event	Date	City	Venue	Attendance	Main event	Ref(s)
1	Honor Rising: Japan 2016: Night 1	February 19, 2016	Tokyo, Japan	Korakuen Hall	1,367	Roderick Strong (c) vs. Tomohiro Ishii for the ROH World Television Championship	
2	Honor Rising: Japan 2016: Night 2	February 20, 2016	Tokyo, Japan	Korakuen Hall	1,718	Jay Lethal (c) vs. Tomoaki Honma for the ROH World Championship	
3	Honor Rising: Japan 2017: Night 1	February 26, 2017	Tokyo, Japan	Korakuen Hall	1,636	Bullet Club (Adam Cole and Kenny Omega) vs. The Briscoe Brothers (Jay Briscoe and Mark Briscoe)	
4	Honor Rising: Japan 2017: Night 2	February 27, 2017	Tokyo, Japan	Korakuen Hall	1,271	Bullet Club (Cody, Kenny Omega, Matt Jackson and Nick Jackson) vs. Chaos (Jay Briscoe, Kazuchika Okada, Mark Briscoe and Will Ospreay)	
5	Honor Rising: Japan 2018: Night 1	February 23, 2018	Tokyo, Japan	Korakuen Hall	1,700	Bullet Club (Kenny Omega and Chase Owens) and Kota Ibushi vs. Bullet Club (Marty Scurll, Hangman Page and Cody)	
6	Honor Rising: Japan 2018: Night 2	February 24, 2018	Tokyo, Japan	Korakuen Hall	1,714	Golden☆Lovers (Kota Ibushi and Kenny Omega) vs. Bullet Club (Marty Scurll and Cody)	
7	Honor Rising: Japan 2019: Night 1	February 22, 2019	Tokyo, Japan	Korakuen Hall	TBA	Jay Lethal, Kazuchika Okada and Hiroshi Tanahashi vs. The Kingdom (Matt Taven, T. K. O'Ryan and Vinny Marseglia)	
8	Honor Rising: Japan 2019: Night 2	February 23, 2019	Tokyo, Japan	Korakuen Hall	TBA	The Briscoe Brothers (Jay Briscoe and Mark Briscoe) (c) vs. David Finlay and Juice Robinson for the ROH World Tag Team Championship	
(c) – refers to the champion(s) heading into the match
