= Toru Yano =

Japanese professional wrestler (born 1978)

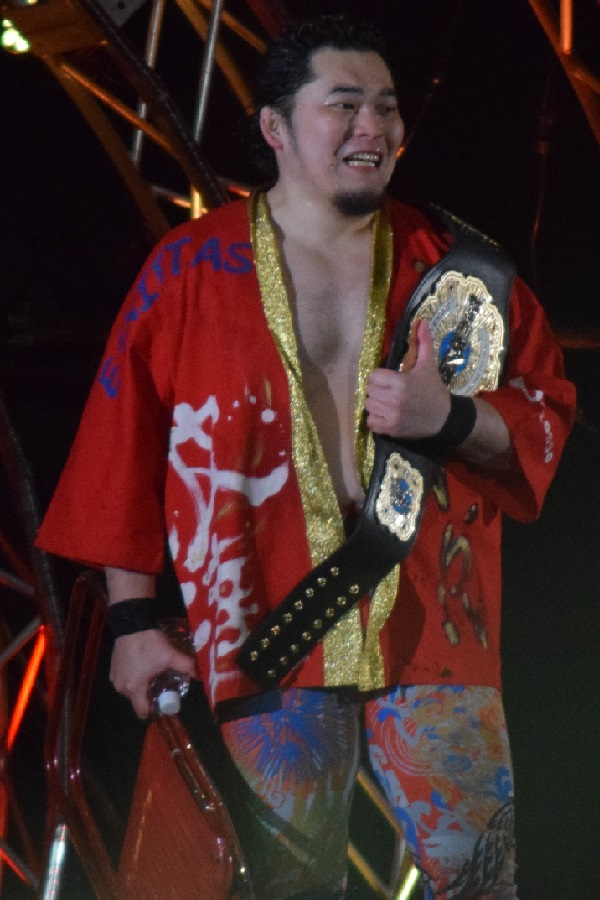
- Yano as a NEVER Openweight 6-Man Tag Team Champion in February 2016

Personal information
- Born: May 18, 1978 (age 48) Arakawa, Tokyo, Japan
- Education: Nihon University

Professional wrestling career
- Ring name: Toru Yano
- Billed height: 1.86 m (6 ft 1 in)
- Billed weight: 115 kg (254 lb)
- Trained by: NJPW Dojo
- Debut: May 18, 2002

Toru Yano (矢野 通, Yano Tōru; born May 18, 1978) is a Japanese professional wrestler, signed to New Japan Pro-Wrestling (NJPW). He is currently the NJPW World Television Champion. He was one-third of the inaugural NEVER Openweight 6-Man Tag Team Champions. He is also a three-time IWGP Tag Team Champion and two-time GHC Tag Team Champion, and was the KOPW 2020 and the KOPW 2021 Provisional Champion.

He is mainly known as a comic relief wrestler, often cheating in an attempt to secure quick wins in his matches. Though often positioned below NJPW's top wrestlers, Yano has gained a reputation as a spoiler, occasionally scoring upset wins over bigger names and feuding with other elite wrestlers.

== Professional wrestling career ==
=== New Japan Pro-Wrestling ===
==== Early career and G.B.H. (2001–2009) ====
Yano was a decorated Greco-Roman wrestler, while studying in Nihon University, winning several amateur titles. In April 2001 Yano entered New Japan Pro-Wrestling's amateur wrestling section, the Toukon Club, in order to become a professional wrestler. He formally joined New Japan in January 2002 and began training full-time for his debut. He would make his debut on May 18, 2002, coincidentally on his 24th birthday, in a match, where he was defeated by his classmate Blue Wolf. On August 31, 2003, Yano ventured into the world of mixed martial arts, when he competed in a match for Pancrase. Yano lost his to date only MMA fight to Osami Shibuya via submission to an armbar in the second round.

After steadily climbing the ranks in New Japan for nearly two years, Yano turned heel in early 2004 and changed his look by dying his hair blonde. From April to July 2004, Yano went on a long streak of losing matches via disqualification. After a learning excursion to the United States in early 2005, Yano joined Masahiro Chono's Black New Japan stable and formed a tag team with Tomohiro Ishii. In June Yano made it to the finals of a tournament for the vacant IWGP U-30 Openweight Championship, but was defeated by Hiroshi Tanahashi. After a disappointing performance in the 2005 G1 Climax, Yano traveled to Germany in October 2005 to compete for European Wrestling Promotion, where he would win his first professional wrestling championship, the EWP Tag Team Championship, teaming with Kendo Kashin. When Yano returned to Japan the following month, he was a changed man, becoming a more serious competitor no longer seeking to break rules. However, when this change failed to bring him any success, Yano reverted to his cheating ways in early 2006 and, together with Ishii, Togi Makabe, Shiro Koshinaka and Tomoaki Honma joined Hiroyoshi Tenzan to form the Great Bash Heel (G.B.H.) stable in December.

In the summer of 2006 Yano took part in New Japan's invasion of Apache Pro-Wrestling Army and on July 29, he defeated Kintaro Kanemura to win the promotion's main title, the WEW Heavyweight Championship, his first title in Japan. The following month Yano took part in the 2007 G1 Climax, this time picking up victories over Manabu Nakanishi and Shiro Koshinaka, but missed the finals of the tournament by a single point after drawing with Hiroshi Tanahashi. After the tournament Yano lost the WEW Heavyweight Championship to Mammoth Sasaki on September 23, 2007. In October Yano entered the 2007 G1 Tag League, teaming with Togi Makabe, who had overthrown Tenzan as the leader of G.B.H., instead of regular tag team partner Ishii. The two of them would go on to win four out of their seven matches in the round-robin stage of the tournament and thus made it to the semifinals, where they would be defeated by the eventual winners of the entire tournament, Giant Bernard and Travis Tomko. After the tournament Yano and Makabe remained together as a tag team, naming their team The Most Violent Players.

On January 4, 2008, at Wrestle Kingdom II in Tokyo Dome, Yano and Makabe were defeated by Team 3D (Brother Devon and Brother Ray), representing American promotion Total Nonstop Action Wrestling (TNA). However, Yano and Makabe bounced back quickly and on February 17 they defeated Giant Bernard and Travis Tomko to win the IWGP Tag Team Championship for the first time. They would successfully defend the titles against the teams of Giant Bernard and Shinsuke Nakamura, Hiroyoshi Tenzan and Takashi Iizuka, Giant Bernard and Rick Fuller, Shinsuke Nakamura and Hirooki Goto and Manabu Nakanishi and Yutaka Yoshie, before entering the 2008 G1 Tag League in October. After four victories out of five in the round-robin stage, Yano and Makabe advanced to the semifinals, where they defeated the team of Shinsuke Nakamura and Hirooki Goto. However, on November 5, Yano and Makabe were defeated in the final match by Satoshi Kojima and Hiroyoshi Tenzan. Yano and Makabe's IWGP title reign of 322 days came to an end on January 4, 2009, when they were defeated by Team 3D for the second year in a row at Wrestle Kingdom III in Tokyo Dome.

==== Forming Chaos (2009–2016) ====
In April 2009, Yano turned on Makabe and together with the rest of G.B.H., excluding Tomoaki Honma, left the stable to join Shinsuke Nakamura and form the new heel stable Chaos, with Nakamura as the leader. When Makabe returned from his injury, suffered at the hands of Yano, he was looking for revenge on his former tag team partner. After several tag team matches, Yano and Makabe were finally booked in a singles match on June 20, where Yano would come out victorious. In the 2009 G1 Tag League Yano teamed up with Shinsuke Nakamura and together the two of them would make it to the semifinals before suffering an upset loss against the Junior Heavyweight tag team Apollo 55 (Prince Devitt and Ryusuke Taguchi). In early 2010 Yano began feuding with Hiroshi Tanahashi, starting on January 30, when he pinned Tanahashi in tag team match. Tanahashi would avenge his loss in a singles match on February 14, but was after the match jumped by Yano and Masato Tanaka, who then proceeded to cut off some of his hair. On May 3 Yano took arguably the biggest victory of his career by defeating the former four-time IWGP Heavyweight Champion Tanahashi in a singles match, after which the two of them were booked in a final Hair vs. Hair match for June 19. On June 19 at Dominion 6.19, Tanahashi defeated Yano, but despite his loss, Yano and his Chaos ally Takashi Iizuka attacked Tanahashi after the match and went to cut his hair, before being stopped by Tajiri, who took care of Iizuka and helped Tanahashi shave Yano's hair to end their feud. Yano then moved on to feuding with Tajiri. Tajiri, Kushida and Tanahashi eliminated Yano and his Chaos partners Iizuka and Gedo from the J Sports Crown Openweight 6 Man Tag Tournament on June 28, 2010, but on July 19 Yano defeated Tajiri via submission in a singles match in less than six minutes to seemingly end their feud. The following month Yano entered the 2010 G1 Climax and managed to win four out of his seven round-robin stage matches, including a major victory over the reigning IWGP Heavyweight Champion Togi Makabe, but finished fourth in his block, thus missing the finals of the tournament. On September 3, Tajiri returned to New Japan and attacked Yano after his match, showing that they were not done with each other. On October 11 at Destruction '10, Tajiri defeated Yano in a singles match. On January 4, 2011, at Wrestle Kingdom V in Tokyo Dome, Yano faced TNA performer Rob Van Dam in a hardcore match in a losing effort. Afterwards, Yano adopted Van Dam's signature thumb point taunt as his own, exchanging the letters "RVD" with "YTR".

In May 2011 Yano took part in New Japan's Invasion Tour 2011, the promotion's first tour of the United States. On May 13 in Rahway, New Jersey, he entered the tournament to determine the first ever IWGP Intercontinental Champion, defeating Dan Maff in his first round match. The following day in New York City, Yano defeated his Chaos stablemate Yujiro Takahashi to advance to the finals of the tournament. On the third and final day of the tour in Philadelphia, Pennsylvania, Yano was defeated by MVP in the finals of the tournament. Yano would also fail to win the title in two rematches, first on June 18 in Osaka and then on July 18 in Sapporo. In August, Yano took part in the 2011 G1 Climax, where he managed to win five out of his nine matches, which included a big win over IWGP Heavyweight Champion Hiroshi Tanahashi. Ultimately, a loss against Giant Bernard on the final day of the tournament eliminated from the running for a spot in the finals. On September 19, Yano started a new rivalry with Yuji Nagata by attacking him after he had defeated his Chaos stablemate Hideo Saito in a grudge match. The two faced each other on October 10 at Destruction '11, where Nagata was able to pick up a pinfall win. Later that same event, Yano attacked Hiroshi Tanahashi, after he had successfully defended the IWGP Heavyweight Championship against Tetsuya Naito and then accepted Nagata as his next challenger, and stole his championship belt, renaming it the "YWGP Heavyweight Championship". After Yano was named the number one contender to the IWGP Heavyweight Championship, he went to team with Shinsuke Nakamura as the "Chaos Top Team" in the 2011 G1 Tag League, scoring a pinfall victory over Tanahashi in the team's opening match against the team of Tanahashi and Hirooki Goto. The Chaos Top Team ended up winning all five of their group stage matches, with Yano also picking up a pinfall victory over Togi Makabe in the process, advancing to the semifinals of the tournament with a clean sheet. On November 6, Yano and Nakamura were eliminated from the tournament in the semifinals by the team of Minoru Suzuki and Lance Archer. On November 12 at Power Struggle, Yano failed to capture the IWGP Heavyweight Championship from Tanahashi. On January 4, 2012, at Wrestle Kingdom VI in Tokyo Dome, Yano teamed with Shinsuke Nakamura in a tag team match, where they were defeated by Pro Wrestling Noah representatives Go Shiozaki and Naomichi Marufuji.

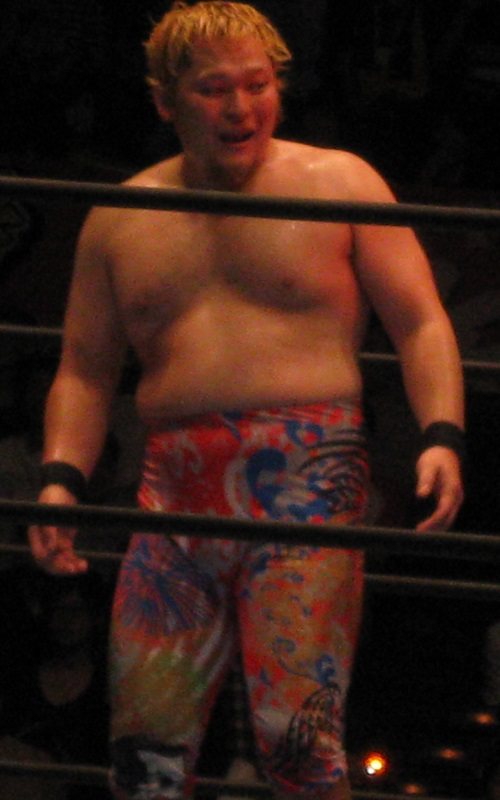
Yano in September 2013

On March 4, 2012, at New Japan's 40th anniversary event, Yano and Takashi Iizuka defeated IWGP Tag Team Champions, Hiroyoshi Tenzan and Satoshi Kojima, in a non-title match, with Yano pinning Kojima for the win. On March 18, Yano and Iizuka attacked Tenzan and Kojima, after they had successfully defended their title against Lance Archer and Yoshihiro Takayama, and stole their championship belts. On May 3 at Wrestling Dontaku 2012, Yano and Iizuka defeated Tenzan and Kojima to win the IWGP Tag Team Championship, starting Yano's second reign with the title. On June 16 at Dominion 6.16, Yano's and Iizuka's first title defense, a rematch against Tenzan and Kojima, ended in a no contest. As a result, four days later Yano and Iizuka were stripped of the IWGP Tag Team Championship. On July 22, Yano and Iizuka were defeated by Tenzan and Kojima in a decision match for the vacant title. Through the second half of 2012, Yano feuded with the returning Manabu Nakanishi, which built to a match on January 4, 2013, at Wrestle Kingdom 7 in Tokyo Dome, where Yano, Bob Sapp, Takashi Iizuka and Yujiro Takahashi were defeated in an eight-man tag team match by Nakanishi, Akebono, MVP and Strong Man. On February 9, Yano and Iizuka made an appearance for Pro Wrestling Noah, wrestling Maybach Taniguchi and Maybach Taniguchi Jr. to a double disqualification. Later, Yano and Iizuka attacked No Mercy leader Kenta after the main event, which led to Maybach Taniguchi coming out to seemingly save his stablemate, however, he ended up hitting Kenta with a chair. Yano then grabbed Naomichi Marufuji's and Takashi Sugiura's GHC Tag Team Championship belts from ringside, before handing Taniguchi Kenta's GHC Heavyweight Championship belt. The following day, Yano and Iizuka were named the number one contenders to the GHC Tag Team Championship. On March 10, Yano and Iizuka defeated Marufuji and Sugiura to become the new GHC Tag Team Champions.

Back in New Japan, Yano became involved in Chaos' rivalry with the promotion's other villainous stable, Suzuki-gun. From March 11 to March 23, Yano took part in the 2013 New Japan Cup, which saw him reach the semifinals following an upset win over Suzuki-gun leader Minoru Suzuki, before losing to Chaos stablemate Kazuchika Okada. In April, Yano and Iizuka took part in Noah's 2013 Global Tag League, where they finished with a record of two wins and two losses, failing to advance to the finals. Yano and Iizuka made their first successful defense of the GHC Tag Team Championship on May 12 against TMDK (Mikey Nicholls and Shane Haste), who had defeated them during the Global Tag League. Post-match, Yano named himself the number one contender to the GHC Heavyweight Championship. His status as the next challenger for Kenta's title was made official the following day. Yano received his title shot on June 2, but was defeated by Kenta. This led to a GHC Tag Team Championship match on June 8, where Yano and Iizuka successfully defended their title against Kenta and Yoshihiro Takayama, with Yano pinning the GHC Heavyweight Champion for the win. Back in New Japan on June 22 at Dominion 6.22, a special three-way match took place for the IWGP Tag Team Championship, held by Hiroyoshi Tenzan and Satoshi Kojima, which also included Yano and Iizuka, the GHC Tag Team Champions, and the NWA World Tag Team Champions, K.E.S. (Davey Boy Smith Jr. and Lance Archer). After Tenzan and Kojima had managed to win the match and retain their title, Yano once again stole their championship belts. On July 7, Yano and Iizuka lost the GHC Tag Team Championship to TMDK in their third defense. On July 20, Yano and Iizuka were defeated by Tenzan and Kojima in another IWGP Tag Team Championship match between the two teams.

From August 1 to 11, Yano took part in the 2013 G1 Climax. Though finishing near the bottom of his block with a record of four wins and five losses, Yano ended his tournament on a high note, defeating Minoru Suzuki and costing him a spot in the finals. This led to a feud between Yano and Suzuki. In the rematch on September 29 at Destruction, Yano was again victorious, after handcuffing Suzuki to a ringside guard rail, which led to him being counted out. This led to another match between them on October 14 at King of Pro-Wrestling, where Suzuki was victorious. From November 24 to December 7, Yano and Iizuka took part in the 2013 World Tag League. Though they finished last in their block with a record of two wins and four losses, Yano once again got to play the spoiler Suzuki, when he and Iizuka defeated Suzuki and Shelton X Benjamin on the final day, costing them a spot in the semi-finals. The rivalry between Yano and Suzuki led to a match on January 4, 2014, at Wrestle Kingdom 8 in Tokyo Dome, where Yano and The Great Muta defeated Suzuki and Benjamin, with Yano pinning his rival for the win, after ducking away from Muta's green mist, which instead blinded Suzuki. Yano and Suzuki again faced off on March 15 in the first round of the 2014 New Japan Cup, where Suzuki was victorious. On May 25 at Back to the Yokohama Arena, Yano and Iizuka faced off against Suzuki and Benjamin in a tag team match, during which Iizuka turned on Yano and Chaos, helping Suzuki pin him for the win and joining Suzuki-gun. From July 21 to August 8, Yano took part in the 2014 G1 Climax, where he finished with a record of four wins and six losses, which included a win over Suzuki. Yano then formed a partnership with Kazushi Sakuraba and transitioned over to feuding with former tag team partner Takashi Iizuka, while Sakuraba took over his feud with Suzuki. In November, Yano and Sakuraba took part in the 2014 World Tag League, finishing in the middle of their block with a record of three wins, one draw and three losses. Yano's rivalry with Iizuka and the rest of Suzuki-gun culminated on January 4, 2015, at Wrestle Kingdom 9 in Tokyo Dome, where he and Pro Wrestling Noah's Naomichi Marufuji, Mikey Nicholls and Shane Haste defeated Iizuka, Davey Boy Smith Jr., Lance Archer and Shelton X Benjamin in an eight-man tag team match. On February 22, the same day he ran the Tokyo Marathon (with a time of 6:47:02), Yano returned to Noah to return the favor and help Marufuji in his new rivalry with Suzuki-gun. Appearing as Marufuji's surprise tag team partner, the two defeated Iizuka and Minoru Suzuki in the main event. Back in NJPW, Yano re-ignited his old rivalry with Hiroshi Tanahashi, after cheating his way to a win over Tanahashi in the opening round of the 2015 New Japan Cup. The rivalry culminated on July 5 at Dominion 7.5 in Osaka-jo Hall, where Yano was defeated by Tanahashi. From July 20 to August 14, Yano took part in the 2015 G1 Climax, where he finished in the middle of his block with a record of four wins and five losses.

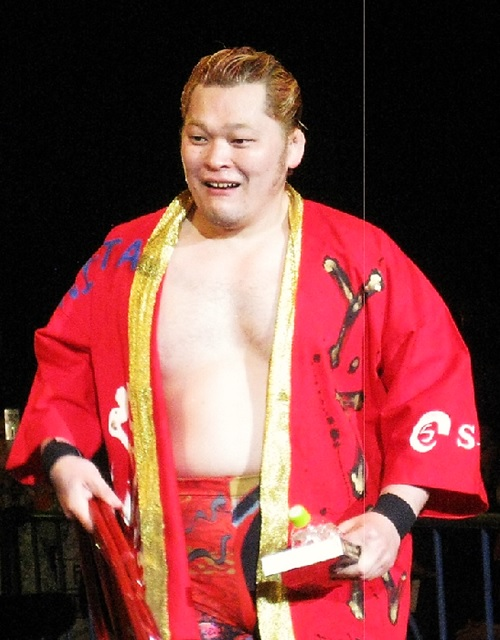
Yano in March 2015

==== Tag team championship reigns and KOPW (2016–present) ====
On January 4, 2016, at Wrestle Kingdom 10 in Tokyo Dome, Yano teamed with the Ring of Honor (ROH) tag team of Jay Briscoe and Mark Briscoe to defeat Bullet Club's Bad Luck Fale, Tama Tonga and Yujiro Takahashi to become the inaugural NEVER Openweight 6-Man Tag Team Champions. The three made their first successful title defense the following day against another Bullet Club trio of Fale, Matt Jackson and Nick Jackson. On February 11 at The New Beginning in Osaka, Yano and the Briscoes lost the NEVER Openweight 6-Man Tag Team Championship to Fale, Tonga and Takahashi in their second defense. Yano and the Briscoes regained the title three days later at The New Beginning in Niigata. On February 20 at the NJPW and ROH co-produced Honor Rising: Japan 2016 event, Yano and the Briscoes lost the title to Kenny Omega, Matt Jackson, and Nick Jackson. From April 21 to May 4, Yano took part in Pro Wrestling Noah's 2016 Global Tag League, where he teamed with Naomichi Marufuji. The two finished second in the single round-robin block, advancing to the finals, where they defeated the reigning GHC Tag Team Champions, Davey Boy Smith Jr. and Lance Archer, to win the tournament. On May 28, Yano and Marufuji defeated Smith and Archer in a rematch to become the new GHC Tag Team Champions. On June 12, Yano and Marufuji defeated Smith and Archer for the third time in a row to make their first successful title defense, and followed that up by defeating another Suzuki-gun team of Minoru Suzuki and Takashi Iizuka on July 5 for their second successful defense. On July 16, Yano and Marufuji made their third successful title defense against The Aggression (Katsuhiko Nakajima and Masa Kitamiya). From July 22 to August 13, Yano took part in the 2016 G1 Climax, where he finished tied third in his block with a record of five wins and four losses, failing to advance to the finals. Through NJPW's relationship with ROH, Yano made his debut for the American promotion on August 19 at Death Before Dishonor XIV, where he and his Chaos stablemates Beretta and Rocky Romero defeated the Bullet Club trio of Tama Tonga, Tanga Loa and Yujiro Takahashi. On October 8, Yano and Marufuji made their fifth successful defense of the GHC Tag Team Championship against Yano's Chaos stablemates Kazuchika Okada and Yoshi-Hashi. They also made their sixth defense against a team from NJPW, defeating Togi Makabe and Tomoaki Honma on October 23. The following month, Yano took part in Noah's 2016 Global League. Despite picking up wins over the likes of Minoru Suzuki and reigning GHC Heavyweight Champion Katsuhiko Nakajima, Yano failed to advance to the finals due to losing to former tag team partner Takashi Iizuka in his final round-robin match, finishing with a record of five wins and two losses. On November 23, Yano and Marufuji lost the GHC Tag Team Championship back to Davey Boy Smith Jr. and Lance Archer in their seventh defense.

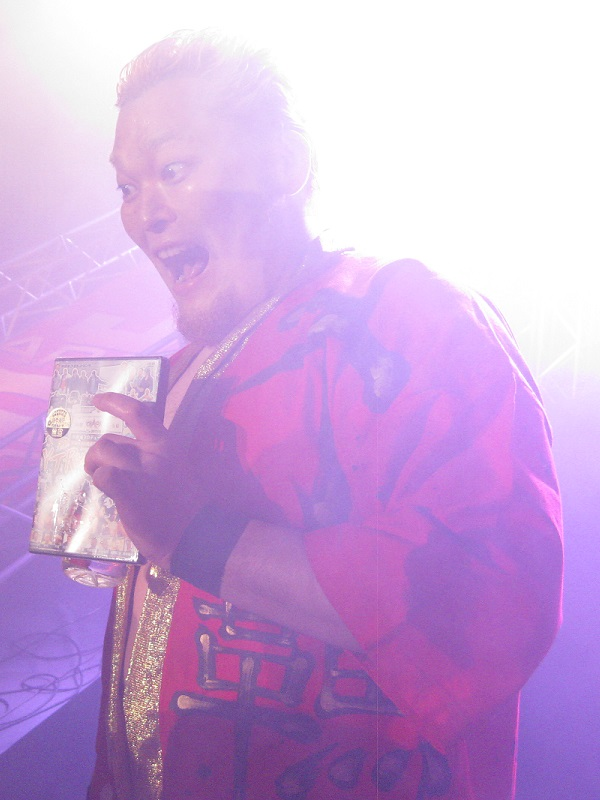
As part of his character, Yano usually bring DVDs to the ring

On December 16, Yano returned to NJPW from his extended stay in Noah, requesting to be added to the IWGP Tag Team Championship match at Wrestle Kingdom 11 in Tokyo Dome with Tomohiro Ishii as his partner. The request was granted after Yano stole the IWGP Tag Team Championship belts, which led to him and Ishii defeating defending champions Guerrillas of Destiny (Tama Tonga and Tanga Loa) and G.B.H. (Togi Makabe and Tomoaki Honma) in a three-way match on January 4, 2017, to become the new IWGP Tag Team Champions. Yano and Ishii made their first successful title defense on February 5 at The New Beginning in Sapporo in a three-way match against G.B.H. and K.E.S. Six days later at The New Beginning in Osaka, Yano and Ishii successfully defended the title in another three-way match against G.B.H. and the team of Davey Boy Smith Jr. and Takashi Iizuka. They lost the title to Hiroyoshi Tenzan and Satoshi Kojima on March 6 at NJPW's 45th anniversary event. During the summer, Yano took part in the 2017 G1 Climax, where he finished with a record of four wins and five losses. Yano's most notable win came in his last match over longtime rival Minoru Suzuki, against whom he now held a 4–0 record in their G1 Climax matches. Afterwards, Yano continued his feud with Suzuki by stealing his NEVER Openweight Championship belt on October 9 at King of Pro-Wrestling. This led to Yano unsuccessfully challenging Suzuki for the title in a bullrope deathmatch on November 5 at Power Struggle.

On January 4, 2018, Yano, Beretta and Tomohiro Ishii won a five-team gauntlet match at Wrestle Kingdom 12 in Tokyo Dome to become the new NEVER Openweight 6-Man Tag Team Champions. They would lose the championships back to the Bullet Club the following day at New Year's Dash !! 2019. Yano would embarrass Davey Boy Smith Jr. by forcing him to lose by countout in the first round of the 2018 New Japan Cup, but would be defeated swiftly by Sanada. Smith would get his revenge at Yano after K.E.S. defeated Yano & Ishii on the final night. Yano's G1 Climax 28 campaign didn't achieve any success, with Yano only earning 3 wins out of his 9 matches. Yano did get a win over then-IWGP Heavyweight Champion Kenny Omega, but he was never granted an official challenge at the belt. In late 2019, Bullet Club was causing Chaos and the Main Unit so many problems that Kazuchika Okada & Hiroshi Tanahashi allied the teams to take them on. This led to Yano and Togi Makabe finally finding peace after Makabe saved Yano from an attack. Yano's 2018 World Tag League was again featuring the team of him and Ishii, where they got 9 out of 13 wins and barely missed the finals.

On January 4, 2019, Yano, Makabe and Ryusuke Taguchi won a five-team gauntlet match at the Wrestle Kingdom 13 in Tokyo Dome pre-show to become the number 1 contender for the NEVER Openweight 6-Man Tag Team Champions. On January 30, 2019, Makabe, Taguchi and Yano defeated Bullet Club to win the NEVER Openweight 6-Man Tag Team Championship. The Most Violent Players reunited in a losing effort against G.O.D at The New Beginning in Osaka (2019), but are still working together as part of the ongoing Chaos/Main Unit alliance. Yano was part of former stablemate Takashi Iizuka's retirement match on February 21, 2019, where he, Okada & Hiroyoshi Tenzan defeated Iizuka, Minoru Suzuki & Taichi. Yano's 2019 New Japan Cup campaign started in similar fashion to last year's, where he embarrassed Davey Boy Smith Jr. in a 5-minute 30 second defeat. He lost in the second round as well, this time to fellow trickster Colt Cabana, who he had teamed with at NJPW/ROH Honor Rising: Japan 2019. Yano's second defense of the 6-man championships came against Bullet Club, this time with the Guerrillas of Destiny's little brother, Hikuleo in place of Fale, in which they retained the championships. Yano and Makabe would earn another match with G.O.D., this time for the IWGP Tag Team Championships at Wrestling Hinokuni, albeit in another losing effort. Yano then entered the G1 Climax 29 tournament. He finished with 8 points failing to advance to the finals, although by defeating Jon Moxley, he became the first person in NJPW to defeat Moxley in a singles match. Yano teamed once again with Colt Cabana for the World Tag League, finishing with 18 points, failing to advance to the finals. Yano, Taguchi and Makabe lost the 6-man championships at on Night 2 of Wrestle Kingdom 14 to Los Ingobernables de Japon in a gauntlet match.

In May 2022, Yano entered the New Japan Cup, he defeated Jado to advance to the second round, but was defeated by Hiromu Takahashi in the second round. In August, NJPW held a tournament to crown new NEVER Openweight 6-man tag-team champions, after Evil betrayed Los Ingobernables de Japon and the titles were vacated. In the tournament, Yano teamed with Chaos stablemates, Kazuchika Okada and Sho. They defeated Bullet Club and Los Ingobernables de Japon to advance to the finals. In the finals, Yano, Sho and Okada lost to fellow Chaos stablemates, Hirooki Goto, Tomohiro Ishii and Yoshi-Hashi.

On July 25, Kazuchika Okada teased a "controversial announcement". Three days later, during a press conference, NJPW chairman Naoki Sugabayashi alongside Okada announced the creation of the KOPW Championship; Okada then proceeded to introduce the title and its concept, also announcing KOPW 2021 for the following year. The tournament to crown the inaugural champion began on August 26 with four first round matches leading to a four-way final at Summer Struggle in Jingu. Yano was announced to be in the tournament, where he defeated Bushi in the first round. In the final at Summer Struggle in Jingu, Yano shockingly pinned Okada, in a four-way match also involving Sanada and El Desperado, to become the first provisional 2020 champion.

In September, Yano competed in the G1 Climax 30 tournament as a part of the B Block, he finished the tournament with 6 points. Yano teamed with Tomohiro Ishii, for the World Tag League, finishing with 10 points, failing to advance to the finals. On the Road to Tokyo Dome, Yano defeated Bad Luck Fale, to become the official 2020 KOPW Champion. On Night 1 of Wrestle Kingdom 15, Yano survived until the final four in the New Japan Rambo match. On Night 2, Yano won a four-way match to become the provisional champion, by defeating Bushi, Fale and Chase Owens. In March 2021, Yano once again entered the New Japan Cup, defeating Bad Luck Fale and Great-O-Khan to advance to the quarter-finals, where he was eliminated by Evil. Yano retained the provisional KOPW Championship against Evil in a Creation Of Darkness Blindfold match. At Wrestle Grand Slam in Tokyo Dome, Chase Owens won a New Japan Rambo with handcuffs match by last eliminating Yano, becoming the new provisional KOPW Champion. At Wrestle Grand Slam in MetLife Dome, Yano regained the provisional KOPW Championship, defeating Owens in a No disqualification "I quit" match. Soon after, Yano entered the G1 Climax 31 tournament, as a part of the A Block. He finished with a total of 10 points, failing to advance to the finals. For the World Tag League, Yano teamed with Hiroshi Tanahashi, where they scored 14 points, failing to advance to the finals. On December 24, Yano defeated Yoshinobu Kanemaru in an End of Year Party Rules match to become the 2021 KOPW Champion. On Night 1 of Wrestle Kingdom 16, Yano finished in the final four in the New Japan Rambo match, along with Chase Owens, Minoru Suzuki and Cima. On Night 2, the four-way match was won by Suzuki, who became the provisional KOPW Champion. On Night 3, Yano teamed with Pro Wrestling NOAH's Kazushi Sakuraba and Takashi Sugiura to defeat Suzuki-Gun.

Yano regained the provisional KOPW Championship, defeating Suzuki in a Dog Cage match. In March, Yano entered the New Japan Cup but was defeated in the first round by Taichi, beginning a feud between the two. At Hyper Battle, Taichi won the provisional KOPW Championship, defeating Yano in a No-rope ring-out match. In July, Yano competed in the A Block of the G1 Climax 32 tournament. Yano finished his G1 campaign with just 2 points, finishing bottom of his block thus failing to advance to te semi-finals, winning just one match against Jonah.

In October, Yano competed in a tournament to crown the inaugural NJPW World Television Champion, defeating Great-O-Khan in the first round, following an interference from The Great Muta. In the following round, Yano was defeated by Ren Narita. In November, Yano once again teamed with Hiroshi Tanahashi in the World Tag League. The duo finished with 8 points, failing to advance to the tournament finals. On January 4, 2023 at Wrestle Kingdom 17, Yano participated in the New Japan Rambo, lasting till the final 4, therefore advancing to the deciding four-way the following night. The day after at New Year Dash!!, the four-way match was won by Shingo Takagi.

In March, Yano entered the New Japan Cup, but lost to Mark Davis in the first round. Later that year in July, Yano entered the 2023 G1 Climax tournament. Yano participated in the D Block, finishing bottom of the block with 4 points. On November 19 at Tanahashi Jam " Yano defeated Shun Skywalker to win the NJPW World Television Championship but whats attacked by Yoshinobu Kanemaru after the match who stole the belt.

== Other media ==
Yano, along with fellow NJPW wrestlers Hiroshi Tanahashi, Hiroyoshi Tenzan, Kazuchika Okada, Satoshi Kojima and Tetsuya Naito, appears as a member of the gang Justis in the 2016 video game Yakuza 6: The Song of Life. He also appears in Kanye West's short film Bully.

== Championships and accomplishments ==
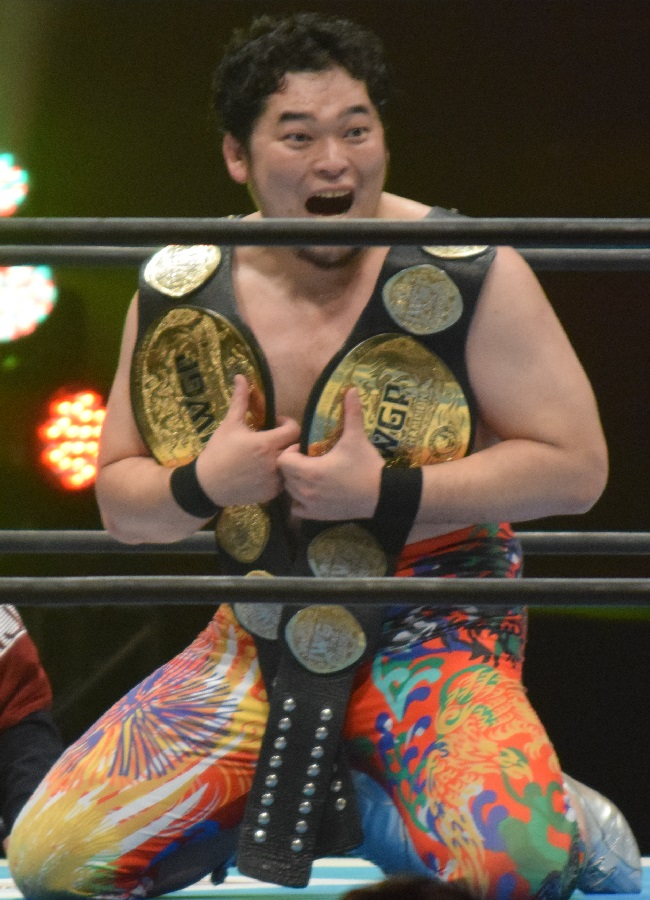
Yano as one half of the IWGP Tag Team Champions in February 2017

- Apache Pro-Wrestling Army
  - WEW Heavyweight Championship (1 time)
- European Wrestling Promotion
  - EWP Tag Team Championship (1 time) – with Kendo Kashin
  - EWP Tag Team Title Tournament (2005) – with Kendo Kashin
- New Japan Pro-Wrestling
  - NJPW World Television Championship (1 time, current)
  - IWGP Tag Team Championship (3 times) – with Togi Makabe (1), Takashi Iizuka (1) and Tomohiro Ishii (1)
  - NEVER Openweight 6-Man Tag Team Championship (7 times) – with Jay Briscoe and Mark Briscoe (2), Beretta and Tomohiro Ishii (1), Ryusuke Taguchi and Togi Makabe (1), Hiroshi Tanahashi and Oleg Boltin (2) and Master Wato and Yoh (1)
  - KOPW (2020, 2021)
  - Provisional KOPW (4 times)
  - New Japan Rambo (2021)
- Pro Wrestling Illustrated
  - Ranked No. 139 of the top 500 singles wrestlers in the PWI 500 in 2011
- Pro Wrestling Noah
  - GHC Tag Team Championship (2 times) – with Takashi Iizuka (1) and Naomichi Marufuji (1)
  - Global Tag League (2016) – with Naomichi Marufuji
- Tokyo Sports
  - Best Bout Award (2011) with Takashi Iizuka vs. Keiji Mutoh and Kenta Kobashi, All Together, August 27
  - Best Tag Team Award (2007) with Togi Makabe

=== Luchas de Apuestas record ===
Winner (wager)	Loser (wager)	Location	Event	Date	Notes
Hiroshi Tanahashi (hair)	Toru Yano (hair)	Osaka, Japan	Dominion 6.19	June 19, 2010	

== Mixed martial arts record ==
Professional record breakdown
1 match	0 wins	1 loss
By submission	0	1

Res.	Record	Opponent	Method	Event	Date	Round	Time	Location	Notes
Loss	0–1	Osami Shibuya	Submission (armbar)	Pancrase: 10th Anniversary Show	August 31, 2003	2	2:35	Tokyo, Japan	
