= Tiger Hattori =

Japanese wrestling referee

Personal information
- Born: Masao Hattori; July 20, 1945 (age 81) Chūō, Tokyo, Japan

Professional wrestling career
- Ring name(s): Tiger Hattori; Masao Hattori; Rising Sun
- Debut: 1978
- Retired: February 19, 2020 (as a referee)

Masao Hattori (服部正男, Hattori Masao; born July 20, 1945), known as Tiger Hattori (タイガー服部, Tāiga Hattori) is a Japanese retired professional wrestler, referee and manager, best known for his work as a referee in New Japan Pro-Wrestling (NJPW). Hattori is currently the foreign liaison officer of NJPW.

Hattori has been active in pro wrestling since the 1970s; he is one of the longest tenured members of the New Japan roster, having made his first appearance in 1982. He has also worked for other companies, including Japan Pro Wrestling, Fighting of World Japan Pro Wrestling, and Pro Wrestling Noah. Hattori retired from refereeing on February 19, 2020.

== Career ==
=== Early career ===
Hattori excelled in amateur wrestling during his time at Meiji University, winning the 1966 Greco-Roman All Japan Wrestling Championship in the bantamweight category. The following year, he travelled to Romania, where he won the World Wrestling Championship as a bantamweight. Hattori would move to the United States after graduation, and was bought in by professional wrestler Hiro Matsuda to work as a coach at his pro wrestling school, where Hattori taught would-be wrestlers the fundamentals of amateur wrestling. His students included Hulk Hogan. Through his work with Matsuda, Hattori began working as a manager for Japanese wrestlers working in America, managing the likes of Masa Saito and Killer Khan in the 1970s. He would also briefly work as a wrestler in the late 70s, working as Rising Sun for a handful of matches in Championship Wrestling from Florida. While in Florida, he was nicknamed "Tiger" by promoter Bill Watts, which he later adopted as his permanent ring name.

=== New Japan Pro-Wrestling (1982–present) ===
After a number of years in America, Hattori returned to Japan in 1982, signing with Antonio Inoki's New Japan Pro-Wrestling as a referee. His first run would be short lived, as he followed longtime associate Riki Choshu to Japan Pro-Wrestling, his new offshoot promotion in 1984. While working there, he also briefly appeared in All Japan Pro Wrestling, where he received more advanced referee training under highly respected senior official Joe Higuchi.

After the collapse of JPW, he returned to New Japan in the late 1980s and became a permanent referee. He was considered the second highest ranking behind senior referee Mr. Takahashi in the 1990s, but began to referee more high-profile matches towards the end of the decade, including the controversial Shinya Hashimoto vs. Naoya Ogawa match on January 4, 1999. In 2001, he was named head referee for New Japan, but stepped down from this position the following year due to poor health.

He would again follow Choshu in leaving New Japan in 2003, joining his new Fighting World of Japan Pro Wrestling (WJ) as head referee. After the promotion collapsed after less than a year in operation, he returned to New Japan in 2004, working as a foreign liaison officer and occasional referee.

Due to age and poor health, Hattori has only refereed minor matches since 2011, including an appearance for Pro Wrestling Noah in 2015, refereeing the GHC Heavyweight Championship match between Minoru Suzuki and Takashi Sugiura, as well as Riki Choshu's retirement match in 2019. Later that year, Hattori announced his own retirement in 2020, scheduled for February 19 in Korakuen Hall. He officiated his final matches in America in September 2019, which included a farewell ceremony where he thanked the American fans. The final match he refereed was Chaos (Hirooki Goto, Kazuchika Okada and Tomohiro Ishii) against Los Ingobernables de Japón (Sanada, Shingo Takagi and Tetsuya Naito).

On February 21, 2023 Hattori came out of retirement to referee an impromptu match between Masahiro Chono and Keiji Muto at the Keiji Muto Grand Final Pro-Wrestling "Last-Love" event.
