= Los Ingobernables de Japon =

Professional wrestling stable

- Logo of Los Ingobernables de Japon

Stable
- Members: See below
- Name(s): Los Ingobernables de Japón; Los Ingobernables de Japon; L.I.J.
- Billed from: Japan
- Debut: November 21, 2015
- Disbanded: May 4, 2025
- Years active: 2015–2025

Los Ingobernables de Japón (ロス・インゴベルナブレス・デ・ハポン, Rosu Ingoberunaburesu de Hapon) (Spanish for "The Ungovernables of Japan" and often spelled without the accent as Los Ingobernables de Japon in English-speaking countries), also shortened to L.I.J. or Los Ingos, was a Japanese professional wrestling stable, based in the New Japan Pro-Wrestling (NJPW) promotion. An offshoot of the Mexican stable Los Ingobernables from the Consejo Mundial de Lucha Libre (CMLL) promotion, the group was formed in November 2015 by Tetsuya Naito, Bushi and Evil, but came to also include Sanada, Hiromu Takahashi, Shingo Takagi, Titán and Yota Tsuji. Through NJPW's working relationship with other companies, they have also appeared in CMLL and in the American Ring of Honor (ROH) promotion.

Los Ingobernables de Japon established itself as one of the most prominent and most popular stables in NJPW. Members of the stable have held the IWGP Heavyweight Championship six times. As part of the stable, Naito also held the IWGP Intercontinental Championship a record eight times and was the first wrestler to have held both the Heavyweight and Intercontinental titles simultaneously. The faction also held under various incarnations the IWGP Tag Team Championship, IWGP Junior Heavyweight Tag Team Championship and NEVER Openweight 6-Man Tag Team Championship. The stable also won several tournaments, like G1 Climax twice, the New Japan Cup three times, the World Tag League three times. Takahashi also won the Best of Super Juniors tournament a record of four times.

In addition to working with CMLL, Bushi also held the CMLL World Welterweight Championship. Also within the company, Titán was also the first official non-Japanese wrestler to join the stable; overall twenty-nine title reigns took place within the stable. Tokyo Sports cited L.I.J.'s impact on NJPW as one of the main factors in the magazine naming Naito the 2016 Wrestler of the Year, a feat he repeated the following year.

After Wrestling Dontaku on May 4, 2025, Naito and Bushi left NJPW, ending the unit as a stable in NJPW; its remaining members remain loosely allied, but unaffiliated to any other NJPW stable. Their final match under the L.I.J. name was at Fantastica Mania Mexico on June 20, 2025. By January 2026, the remnants of the L.I.J. stable known as Unaffiliated had merged with Bullet Club to form a new stable named Unbound Co.

== History ==
=== Tetsuya Naito's leadership (2013–2025) ===
==== Origins and background (2013–2016) ====
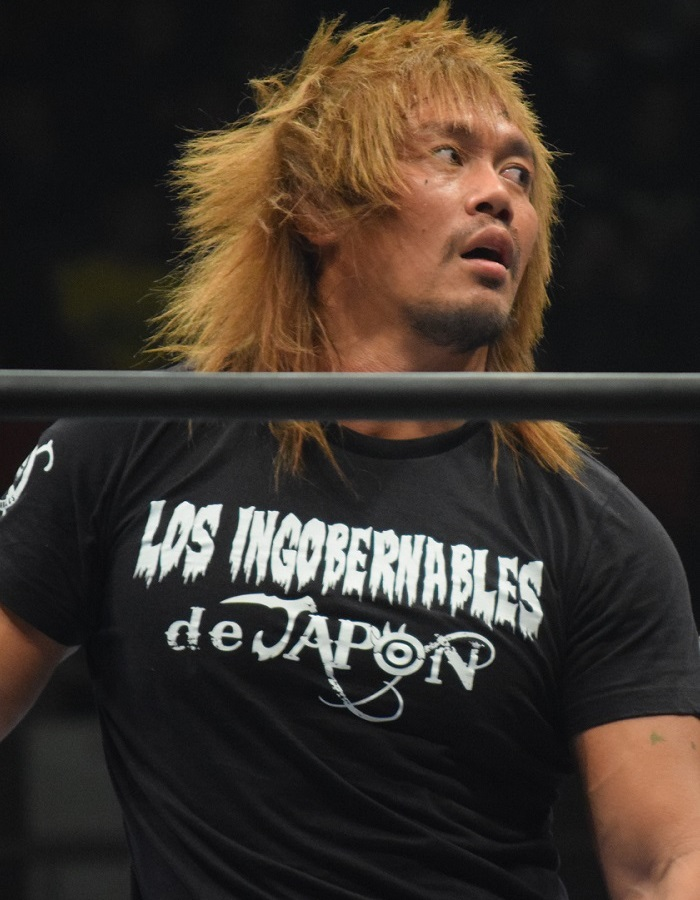
Tetsuya Naito, the leader of Los Ingobernables de Japon

In June 2013, Tetsuya Naito returned to New Japan Pro-Wrestling (NJPW) from a legitimate anterior cruciate ligament injury. Two months later, Naito defeated Hiroshi Tanahashi in the final to win NJPW's premier singles tournament, the G1 Climax. Despite being a clean-cut babyface, Naito was soundly rejected by NJPW fans and his win over Tanahashi was booed. NJPW had pegged Naito as their next top babyface star, but seeing how the fans were reacting to him, the company changed their course of action and announced a fan vote to decide whether the planned IWGP Heavyweight Championship match between Naito and Kazuchika Okada or an IWGP Intercontinental Championship match between Shinsuke Nakamura and Hiroshi Tanahashi would main event the promotion's biggest event of the year, Wrestle Kingdom 8 in Tokyo Dome. The fans voted Nakamura and Tanahashi to main event the show with Naito and Okada relegated to semi-main event. After failing to capture the IWGP Heavyweight Championship from Okada, Naito would remain a step below the top spot in NJPW.

During the summer of 2015, Naito, through a working relationship between NJPW and the Mexican Consejo Mundial de Lucha Libre (CMLL) promotion, worked a tour of CMLL, during which he joined the Los Ingobernables stable. Upon his June return to NJPW, Naito continued representing Los Ingobernables, adopting the villainous attitude associated with the stable, using the fans' rejection of him as a catalyst for the change. In the weeks leading to October's King of Pro-Wrestling event, Naito began teasing bringing in a pareja ("partner") to witness his match against Hiroshi Tanahashi, contested for Tanahashi's contract for a shot at the IWGP Heavyweight Championship at Wrestle Kingdom 10 in Tokyo Dome. At the October 12 event, Takaaki Watanabe, making his NJPW return after a two-year overseas learning excursion, was revealed as Naito's pareja as he attacked Hiroshi Tanahashi during his match with Naito. Watanabe's outside interference was stopped by Hirooki Goto and Katsuyori Shibata, which led to Tanahashi defeating Naito to retain his contract. In a post-match interview, Naito gave Watanabe his new ring name, "King of Darkness" Evil.

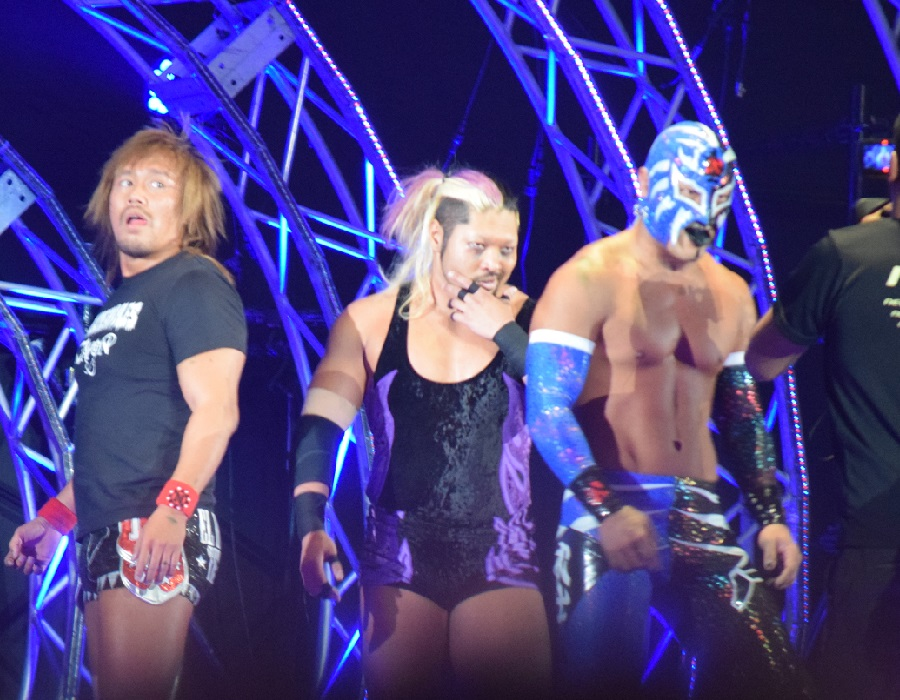
The original line-up of the stable (left to right): Naito, Evil and Bushi in February 2016.

==== Creation and rise to prominence (2015–2016) ====
On November 21, Naito and Evil entered the 2015 World Tag League. During the opening night, Bushi, making his return following an injury, debuted as the new third member of the group, which was subsequently dubbed Los Ingobernables de Japon. Naito and Evil ended up making it to the final of the World Tag League, before losing to G.B.H. (Togi Makabe and Tomoaki Honma). On the day of the final, December 9, Bushi offered Máscara Dorada a spot in Los Ingobernables de Japon. After being turned down, Bushi attacked Dorada, unmasked him and stole his CMLL World Welterweight Championship belt. This led to a title match on December 19, where Bushi defeated Dorada with help from his stablemates to bring Los Ingobernables de Japon its first championship. Bushi lost the title back to Dorada during the CMLL and NJPW co-produced Fantastica Mania 2016 tour on January 22, 2016. On February 20, at the NJPW and Ring of Honor (ROH) co-produced Honor Rising: Japan 2016 event, Los Ingobernables de Japon helped Jay Lethal retain the ROH World Championship in a match against Tomoaki Honma. Following the match, both Lethal and his manager Truth Martini joined the stable. While this marked Martini's only appearance as a member of Los Ingobernables de Japon, Lethal continued making sporadic appearances as part of the group over the following months.

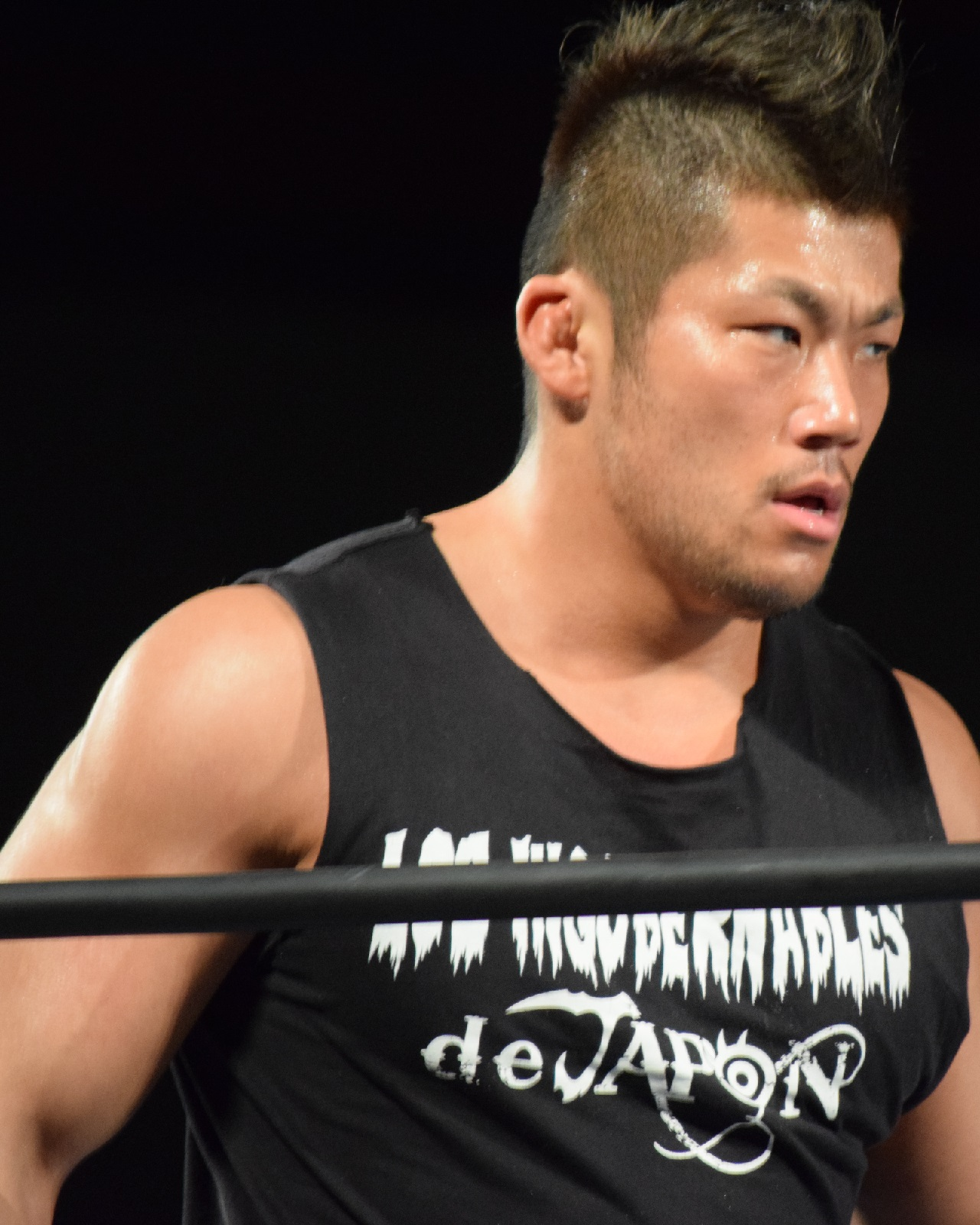
Sanada made his surprise NJPW debut at Invasion Attack 2016, aligning himself with the stable by helping Naito capture the IWGP Heavyweight Championship.

On March 12, Naito, with help from both Bushi and Evil, defeated Hirooki Goto in the final to win the 2016 New Japan Cup. With the win, Naito earned the right to challenge for a title of his choosing and chose to face IWGP Heavyweight Champion Kazuchika Okada. On April 10 at Invasion Attack 2016, Sanada debuted as the newest member of Los Ingobernables de Japon, helping Naito defeat Okada for the IWGP Heavyweight Championship. On May 3 at Wrestling Dontaku 2016, Naito made his first successful defense of the IWGP Heavyweight Championship against Okada's Chaos stablemate Tomohiro Ishii. Following the match, Okada, who had earlier in the event defeated Sanada, intimated that he wanted a title rematch with Naito. Also in May, Bushi took part in the 2016 Best of the Super Juniors. Although he failed to advance from his block with a record of four wins and three losses, Bushi scored a major win in his final match of the tournament on June 6 by defeating reigning IWGP Junior Heavyweight Champion Kushida, causing him to miss the final of the tournament. On June 19 at Dominion 6.19 in Osaka-jo Hall, Naito lost the IWGP Heavyweight Championship back to Okada, ending his two-month reign in his second defense. From July 18 to August 13, Naito, Evil and Sanada all took part in the 2016 G1 Climax, with Sanada wrestling in block A and Naito and Evil in block B. All three failed to advance to the final with Naito finishing second in his block with a record of six wins and three losses, while Sanada and Evil both finished with records of four wins and five losses. Naito was victorious over Evil in the head-to-head match between the two stablemates. During the tournament, Naito scored a win over Michael Elgin, which put him in line for a shot at Elgin's IWGP Intercontinental Championship. On August 20, Jay Lethal's association with the stable came to an end, when Naito and Evil abandoned him during a six-man tag team match at an ROH event in Las Vegas, Nevada.

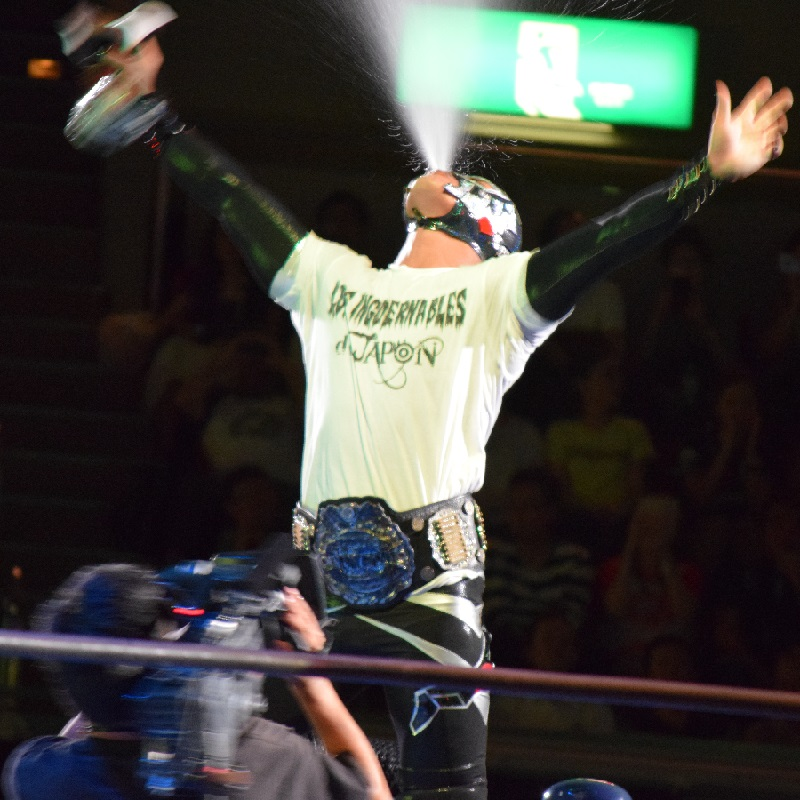
Bushi as the IWGP Junior Heavyweight Champion in September 2016

On September 17 at Destruction in Tokyo, Bushi received a shot at the IWGP Junior Heavyweight Championship, which he had earned with the win over Kushida during the 2016 Best of the Super Juniors. Bushi was accompanied to the match by a new unidentified member of the Los Ingobernables de Japon, who had debuted earlier in the week. The match featured outside interference from both Naito and Michael Elgin and ended with Bushi defeating Kushida to bring the IWGP Junior Heavyweight Championship to Los Ingobernables de Japon. On September 25 at Destruction in Kobe, the stable won another title, when Naito defeated Elgin for the IWGP Intercontinental Championship. Bushi lost the IWGP Junior Heavyweight Championship back to Kushida on November 5 at Power Struggle. Later that same event, Evil defeated Katsuyori Shibata to become the new NEVER Openweight Champion. Evil lost the title back to Shibata ten days later in Singapore. The following week, three members of the stable entered the 2016 World Tag League with Evil and Sanada teaming together, while Naito partnered with CMLL wrestler and original Los Ingobernables member Rush. Naito had planned a teamup between the Los Ingobernables and Los Ingobernables de Japon stables for the previous year's tournament, but the CMLL wrestlers had been busy and unable to participate. Naito and Rush finished the tournament on December 7 with a record of four wins and three losses, failing to advance to the final due to losing to block winners Guerrillas of Destiny (Tama Tonga and Tanga Loa) in their final round-robin match. The following day, Evil and Sanada finished their block with a record of five wins and two losses, tied with block winners Togi Makabe and Tomoaki Honma, but failed to advance due to losing to Makabe and Honma in the head-to-head match.

==== Continued growth and tag team success (2016–2019) ====
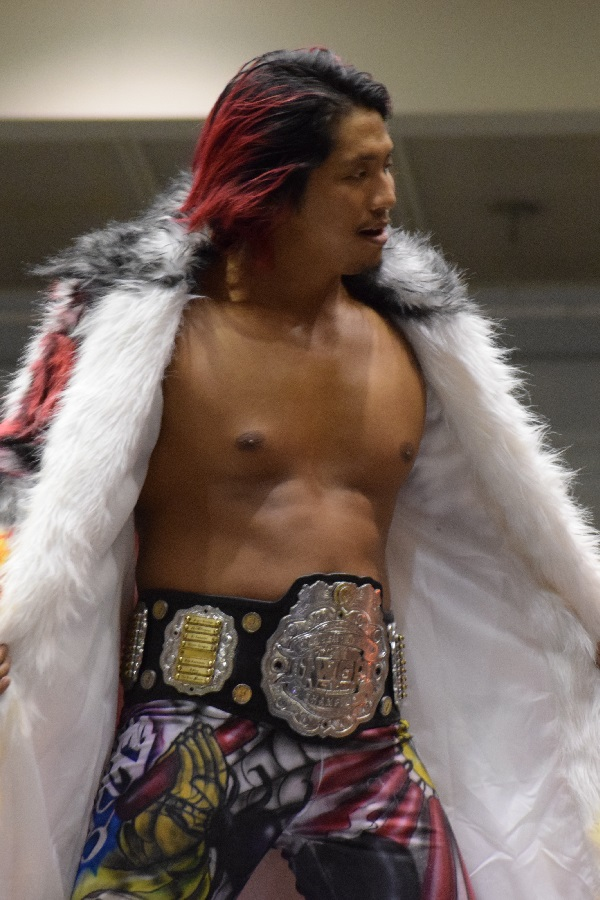
Hiromu Takahashi, who joined the stable in December 2016, as IWGP Junior Heavyweight Champion

On December 10, Hiromu Takahashi joined Los Ingobernables de Japon. Takahashi had recently returned to NJPW from a three-year overseas learning excursion, during which he mainly worked for CMLL. On the same show, Bushi, Evil and Sanada defeated Hiroyoshi Tenzan, Yuji Nagata and NEVER Openweight 6-Man Tag Team Champion Satoshi Kojima in a six-man tag team match, after which Bushi made a title challenge against Kojima and his championship partners David Finlay and Ricochet. On January 4, 2017, at Wrestle Kingdom 11 in Tokyo Dome, Bushi, Evil and Sanada defeated Finlay, Ricochet and Kojima as part of a four-team gauntlet match, which also included the Bullet Club trio of Bad Luck Fale, Hangman Page and Yujiro Takahashi and the Chaos trio of Jado, Will Ospreay and Yoshi-Hashi, to become the new NEVER Openweight 6-Man Tag Team Champions. Later that same event, Takahashi defeated Kushida to become the new IWGP Junior Heavyweight Champion. Tetsuya Naito's successful defense of the IWGP Intercontinental Championship against Hiroshi Tanahashi marked a clean sweep for L.I.J., who left Wrestle Kingdom 11 holding three championships.

Following Wrestle Kingdom 11, L.I.J. entered a rivalry with the Taguchi Japan stable over all three of their championships. Naito went on to successfully defend the Intercontinental Championship against Taguchi Japan members Michael Elgin and Juice Robinson, while Takahashi defended the Junior Heavyweight Championship against their stablemates Dragon Lee, Kushida, and Ricochet. Meanwhile, Bushi, Evil and Sanada exchanged the NEVER Openweight 6-Man Tag Team Championship with members of Taguchi Japan multiple times. They first lost the title to Hiroshi Tanahashi, Manabu Nakanishi and Ryusuke Taguchi on January 5, then regained it on February 11 at The New Beginning in Osaka, then lost it to Tanahashi, Taguchi and Ricochet on April 4, before regaining it again on May 3 at Wrestling Dontaku 2017. On June 11 at Dominion 6.11 in Osaka-jo Hall, Takahashi lost the IWGP Junior Heavyweight Championship to the winner of the 2017 Best of the Super Juniors, Kushida. Later that same event, Naito lost the IWGP Intercontinental Championship to Hiroshi Tanahashi.

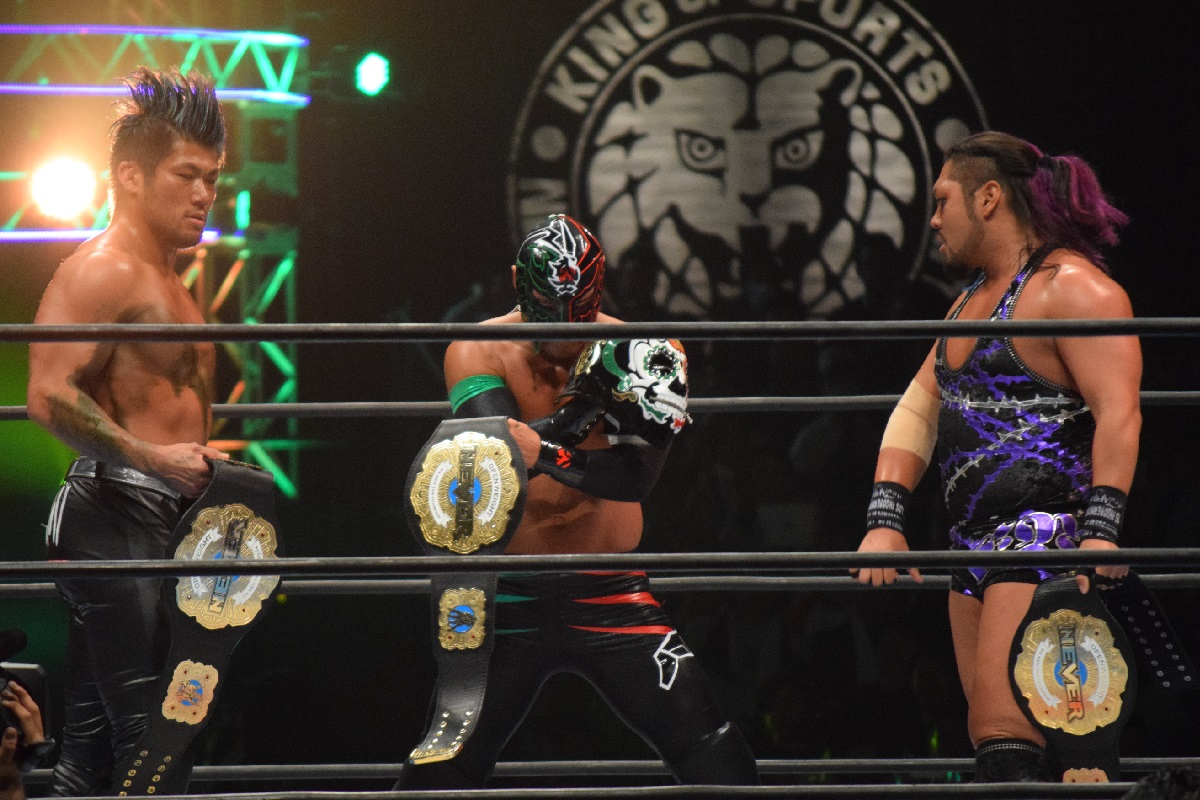
Sanada, Bushi and Evil as the NEVER Openweight 6-Man Tag Team Champions in February 2017

The following month, three members of L.I.J. took part in the 2017 G1 Climax; Naito in block A and Evil and Sanada in block B. Naito won his block with a record of seven wins and two losses and advanced to the final of the tournament. Meanwhile, Evil finished third in his block with a record of three losses and six wins, one of which came over the reigning IWGP Heavyweight Champion Kazuchika Okada. Sanada, who won the head-to-head match against Evil, finished in the middle of the block with a record of four wins and five losses. On August 13, Naito defeated Kenny Omega in the final to win the 2017 G1 Climax. With Naito now fully embraced by the over 10,000 people in attendance, the win was seen as a conclusion of a four-year arc, which started with Naito's rejection by NJPW fans following his 2013 G1 Climax win and led directly to the creation of Los Ingobernables de Japon. In late 2017, Bushi and Takahashi started teaming regularly in NJPW's junior tag team division. On November 12, Los Ingobernables de Japon made their first appearance in Mexico, when Naito and Takahashi returned to CMLL to team with Rush. The three were defeated in a six-man tag team match, when Rush allowed Volador Jr. to pin himself, reaffirming his previous invitation for Volador to join Los Ingobernables. In December, Evil and Sanada won their block in the 2017 World Tag League with a record of five wins and two losses, advancing to the final of the tournament. On December 11, they defeated Guerrillas of Destiny in the final to win the tournament. Six days later, Bushi, Evil and Sanada lost the NEVER Openweight 6-Man Tag Team Championship to Guerrillas of Destiny and Bad Luck Fale in their fourth defense.

On January 4, 2018, at Wrestle Kingdom 12 in Tokyo Dome, Evil and Sanada defeated the Killer Elite Squad (Davey Boy Smith Jr. and Lance Archer) to win the IWGP Tag Team Championship for the first time. In the main event of the show, Naito unsuccessfully challenged Kazuchika Okada for the IWGP Heavyweight Championship. At Wrestling Hinokuni, Naito defeated Minoru Suzuki to win the IWGP Intercontinental Championship. He eventually lost the title to Chris Jericho at Dominion 6.9 in Osaka-jo Hall. At the G1 Special in San Francisco, Takahashi successfully defended his title against Dragon Lee, but suffered a broken neck during the match, resulting in him becoming inactive and having to vacate the title.

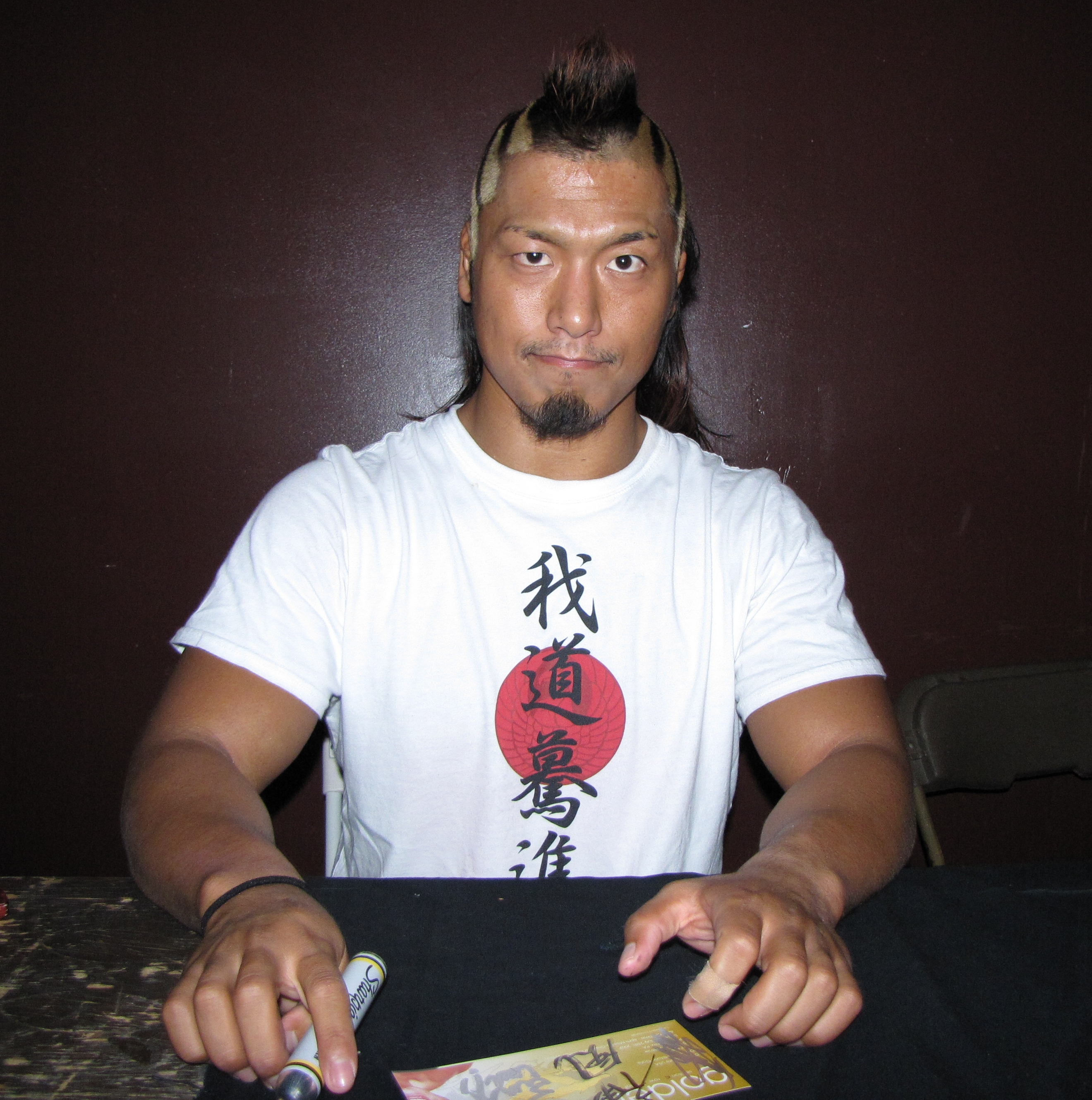
Shingo Takagi joined the stable in October 2018 when making his surprise NJPW debut at King of Pro-Wrestling. He would go on to have an undefeated streak as a singles competitor that would last until June 2019.

On October 8, 2018, at King of Pro Wrestling, fourteen years-Dragon Gate veteran Shingo Takagi made his surprise NJPW debut as L.I.J.'s sixth member, teaming up with Naito, Bushi and Sanada to defeat CHAOS. Takagi would go on to compete in the Junior Heavyweight division, and would stay both undefeated in singles matches and overall unpinned and unsubmitted until June 2019; during this period, he suffered only three defeats in 72 consecutive matches, all of which were tag team matches in which a partner was pinned. He would quickly form a tag team with Bushi; they competed in the Super Junior Tag Tournament, advancing to the final at Power Struggle where they lost to Roppongi 3K in a Three-way tag team match also involving Yoshinobu Kanemaru and El Desperado of Suzuki-Gun.

At Wrestle Kingdom 13, all five active members of the stable won titles: Naito regained the IWGP Intercontinental Championship from Jericho, Evil and Sanada won the IWGP Tag Team Championship by defeating Guerrillas of Destiny and The Young Bucks, and Bushi and Takagi won the IWGP Junior Heavyweight Tag Team Championship by defeating Kanemaru and El Desperado and Roppongi 3K. On February 2 at The New Beginning in Sapporo, Bushi and Takagi retained their titles against Kanemaru and El Desperado, while Evil and Sanada retained their titles against Minoru Suzuki and Zack Sabre Jr., and Naito retained the Intercontinental Championship against Taichi. All five champions lost their titles during the following two months, with Evil and Sanada losing their titles to Guerrillas of Destiny on February 23 at Honor Rising: Japan 2019, Bushi and Takagi losing theirs to Roppongi 3K on March 6 at NJPW's 47th Anniversary Show, and Naito losing the Intercontinental Championship to Kota Ibushi On April 6 at G1 Supercard; also at G1 Supercard, Evil and Sanada lost a Winner takes all four-way tag team match for both their old title and the ROH World Tag Team Championship, which was won by the Guerrillas of Destiny.

From May to June 2019, both Bushi and Takagi took part in the Best of Super Juniors tournament. While Bushi would fail to advance in Block B with 12 points (with six wins and three losses), Takagi won block A by winning all nine of his matches and scoring 18 points; this set up a new record for most victories within the same block, as well as a new record for most points scored at the tournament (not counting the original 1988 tournament which used a different point system). He eventually lost in the final against Block B winner Will Ospreay on June 5, marking his first defeat in New Japan as a singles competitor. The match received considerable acclaim, with Dave Meltzer giving it a rare five and three-quarter out of five rating and calling it "the best junior heavyweight match I’ve ever seen and one of the best matches in any division"; it would go on to be Takagi's final match and only singles loss in the Junior Heavyweight division.

At Dominion 6.9 in Osaka-jo Hall, Naito regained the IWGP Intercontinental Championship from Ibushi, Evil and Sanada failed to capture the Tag Team titles from the Guerrillas of Destiny, and Takagi defeated heavyweight Satoshi Kojima; after his win, Takagi announced his decision to move to the Heavyweight division and declared himself an entrant for the G1 Climax. At the G1 Climax, Evil and Sanada competed in Block A while Naito and Takagi competed in Block B, but all four failed to reach the final. After defeating him during the G1 Climax, Jay White received a title match for Naito's IWGP Intercontinental Championship at Destruction in Kobe, where Naito lost the match and title.

==== New Japan domination, Evil and Sanada's betrayals, and new additions (2019–2025) ====
In November 2019 at Power Struggle, after Bushi unsuccessfully challenged Will Ospreay for the IWGP Junior Heavyweight Championship, Hiromu Takahashi made his return after sixteen months of absence, challenging Ospreay for a future title match at Wrestle Kingdom 14, which Ospreay accepted. His return match took place on December 19, 2019, during the Road to Tokyo Dome event, 530 days after his last match, with he and Bushi losing to Ospreay and Robbie Eagles. Line 80:

In June, Sanada returned at Dominion 6.12 in Osaka-jo Hall, failing to defeat Will Ospreay for the vacant IWGP United States Heavyweight Championship. The following month, Sanada, Takagi and Naito entered the G1 Climax 32 tournament. In the B block, Sanada finished middle of his block, with 6 points. Takagi narrowly missed out on topping the D Block, after losing to El Phantasmo, thus finishing on 6 points. In the C Block, Naito defeated Sabre Jr to top the C Block, however, lost to Will Ospreay in the semifinal round. In July and September, Takahashi and Takagi made their debuts on NJPW's US show, NJPW Strong.

In October 10, Titán joined the stable, becoming the first full-time non-Japanese member. In March 5, Sanada left L.I.J and joined the Just 4 Guys stable, while Yota Tsuji, who recently made his return from his excursion, joined Los Ingobernables. Los Ingobernables participatd into G1 Climax 33, with Naito winning the tournament after he defeated Kazuchika Okada in the finals to win the G1 Climax 33, thus earning a shot at the IWGP World Heavyweight Championship at Wrestle Kingdom 18. On October 28, at Fighting Spirit Unleashed, Takagi defeated Tama Tonga to win the NEVER Openweight Championship.

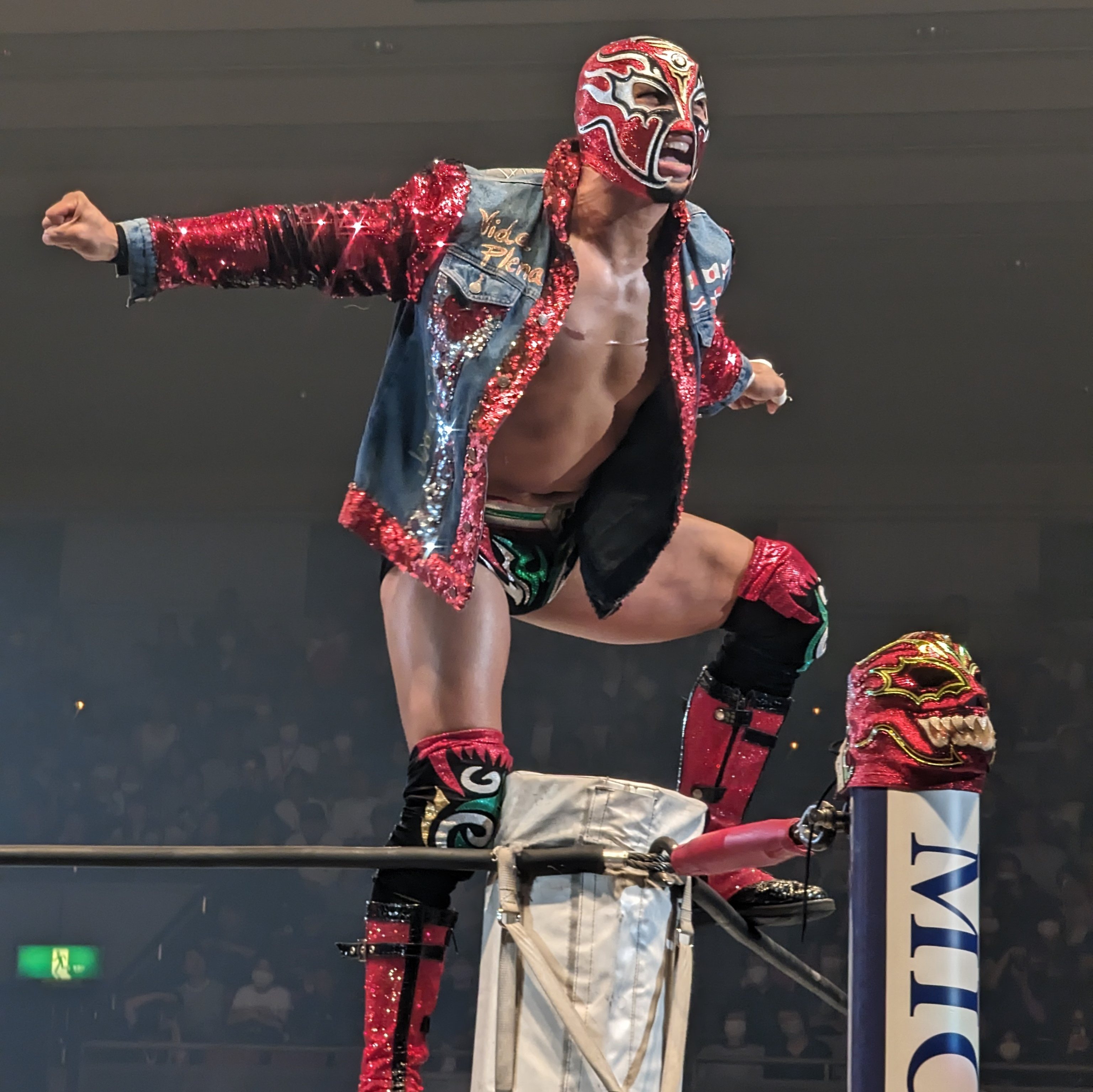
In 2022, Titán became the first full time non-Japanese member of Los Ingobernables

On January 4, 2024 at Wrestle Kingdom 18, Takagi lost the NEVER Openweight Championship back to Tama Tonga and Takahashi lost the IWGP Junior Heavyweight Championship to El Desperado, but Naito defeated Sanada to win the IWGP World Heavyweight Championship. On February 24 at The New Beginning in Sapporo: Night 2, in the match series, L.I.J and Just 5 Guys were tied in an aggregate score of 2–2, with Tsuji defeating Yuya Uemura in a Hair vs. Hair match. In the main event, Naito successfully defended the IWGP World Heavyweight Championship against Sanada, thus winning the match series between both stables. At Sakura Genesis, Takagi defeated Evil to win the NEVER Openweight Championship. Later that night, New Japan Cup winner Tsuji unsuccessfully challenged Naito for the IWGP World Heavyweight Championship. While Naito lost the title at Windy City Riot to Jon Moxley, he regained it at Forbidden Door.

In May, three members of L.I.J took part in the 2024 Best of the Super Juniors with Bushi and Titán wrestling in Block A and Takahashi in Block B, with all three failing to advance from their blocks. On June 9 at Dominion 6.9 in Osaka-jo Hall, Tsuji, BUSHI and Takahashi defeated Hiroshi Tanahashi, Toru Yano and Boltin Oleg to win the NEVER Openweight 6-Man Tag Team Championship, before losing it back to them on June 16 at New Japan Soul; Night 1. Also at New Japan Soul, Takagi lost the NEVER Openweight Championship to Henare.

On August 18, Tsuji was defeated by Zack Sabre Jr. in the finals of the G1 Climax 34. On September 29 at Destruction in Kobe, Takagi defeated Henare to win the NEVER Openweight Championship. On October 14 at King of Pro-Wrestling, Naito lost the IWGP World Heavyweight Championship to the G1 Climax winner Zack Sabre Jr.

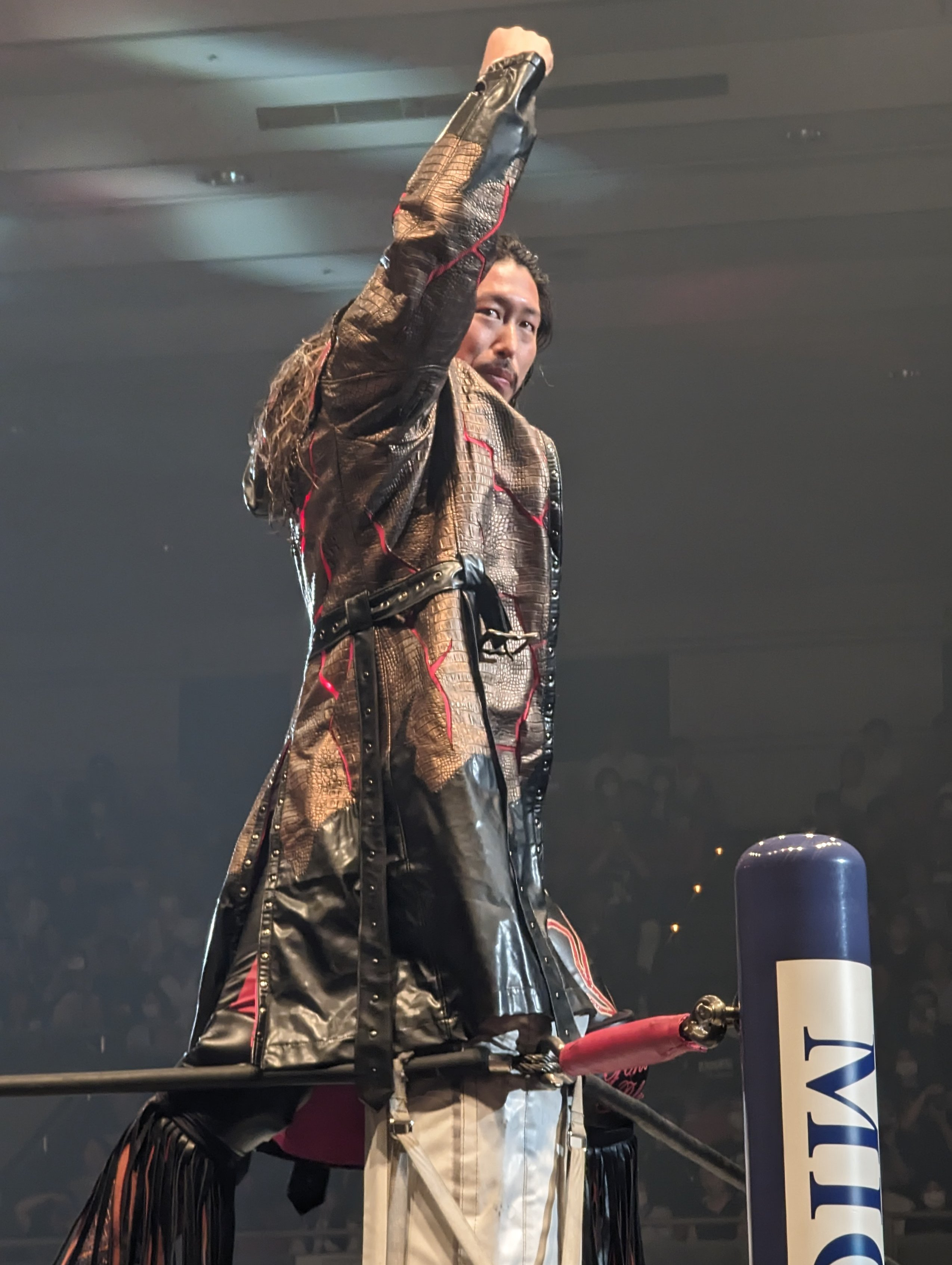
Yota Tsuji was the last wrestler who joined the stable

From October 24 to November 2, Bushi and Takahashi took part in the 2024 Super Junior Tag League, finishing the tournament with a record two wins and three losses, failing to advance to the finals. On November 4, at Power Struggle, Naito proposed Takahashi to team with him for the upcoming 2024 World Tag League, which he accepted. On December 6, it was announced that, due to Naito and Takahashi being tied 10 points with both House of Torture's EVIL and Ren Narita, and Toru Yano and Boltin Oleg, the three teams would face each other in a three-way match to decide the finalists of the tournament, which they won. On December 8, Naito and Takahashi defeated Bullet Club War Dogs' Gabe Kidd and Sanada in the finals to win the tournament. Following the match, Naito was challenged by Takahashi to a match on January 4, 2025 at Wrestle Kingdom 19 in Tokyo Dome, which he accepted. At the event, Takagi lost the NEVER Openweight Championship to Konosuke Takeshita in a Winner Takes All match also for Takeshita's AEW International Championship. On the same night, Tsuji defeated David Finlay to win the IWGP Global Heavyweight Championship, and Naito defeated Takahashi.

On January 5, at Wrestle Dynasty, Naito and Hiromu, as the 2024 World Tag League winners, failed to win the IWGP Tag Team Championship in a three-way match involving The Young Bucks (Matthew Jackson and Nicholas Jackson), who won the match, and United Empire's Great-O-Khan and Henare. On January 6 at New Year Dash!!, Naito and Takahashi challenged The Young Bucks to a title match at The New Beginning in Osaka on February 11. At the event, Naito and Takahashi defeated The Young Bucks to become the new champions. They lost the titles to United Empire's Jeff Cobb and Callum Newman on April 5 at Sakura Genesis

=== Disbandment (2025) ===
On April 16, 2025, it was announced that both Naito and Bushi would not be renewing their contract and would be leaving NJPW after fulfilling their dates at the Wrestling Dontaku series the next month. Their final match was at Wrestling Dontaku: Night 2 on May 4 where they teamed with Takagi and Hiromu to defeat Shota Umino, Tomohiro Ishii and Just 4 Guys' Taichi and Taka Michinoku. At the same event, it was announced that L.I.J would be ending as a stable moving forward. The trio of Takahashi, Takagi, and Titán had one final match at CMLL's Fantastica Mania Mexico on June 20, 2025 under the L.I.J. name, with Tsuji joining them for a final roll call before fully dissolving the banner.

== Reception ==
Dave Meltzer wrote on his Wrestling Observer Newsletter that prior to the formation of L.I.J., Naito was known as "something of a genius in the ring for his ability to lay out matches", but noted that "something didn't click", calling his reception "a combination of some fans booing, and some apathy". However, after copying the Los Ingobernables concept he had seen in Mexico, Naito, according to Meltzer, became "more and more popular for being different", with L.I.J. dress clothes, shirts and masks becoming "the cool wrestling merchandise". According to former Bullet Club leader Kenny Omega, L.I.J. took over Bullet Club's status as "the hottest thing around". When Naito won the 2016 MVP award for Wrestler of the Year from Tokyo Sports, the magazine called Los Ingobernables de Japon a phenomenon that had ushered in a new era. Naito's win ended a five-year run in which the award had been won by either Hiroshi Tanahashi or Kazuchika Okada. The following year, Naito became the fifth wrestler to win the award in consecutive years.

L.I.J. also gained fans outside of professional wrestling. Teruo Iwamoto, a retired soccer player who had represented the Japanese national team, was a lapsed professional wrestling fan until seeing L.I.J. He went on to become close friends with members of the stable, was teased as a possible tag team partner for Naito in the 2016 World Tag League, and was eventually given the honorary role of L.I.J.'s "public relations manager".

During 2017, the Hiroshima Toyo Carp baseball team released Carp de Japon and Tranquilo de Carp shirts, both designed with an L.I.J. theme.

== Members ==
| * | Founding members |
| L | Leader(s) |

| Member | | Joined | Left |
|---|---|---|---|
| Rush (Note: Part-time member; Full-time member of the original Los Ingobernables.) | | November 21, 2015 | September 27, 2019 |
| Jay Lethal (Note: Part-time member; Mainly represented the group in Ring of Honor.) | | February 20, 2016 | August 20, 2016 |
| Truth Martini (Note: One-off appearance; Lethal's manager.) | | February 20, 2016 | |
| Evil | * | November 21, 2015 | July 11, 2020 |
| Sanada | | April 10, 2016 | March 17, 2023 |
| Tetsuya Naito | *L | November 21, 2015 | May 4, 2025 |
| Bushi | * | November 21, 2015 | May 4, 2025 |
| Hiromu Takahashi | | December 10, 2016 | May 4, 2025 |
| Shingo Takagi | | October 8, 2018 | May 4, 2025 |
| Titán | | October 10, 2022 | May 4, 2025 |
| Yota Tsuji | | June 3, 2023 | May 4, 2025 |

== Championships and accomplishments ==
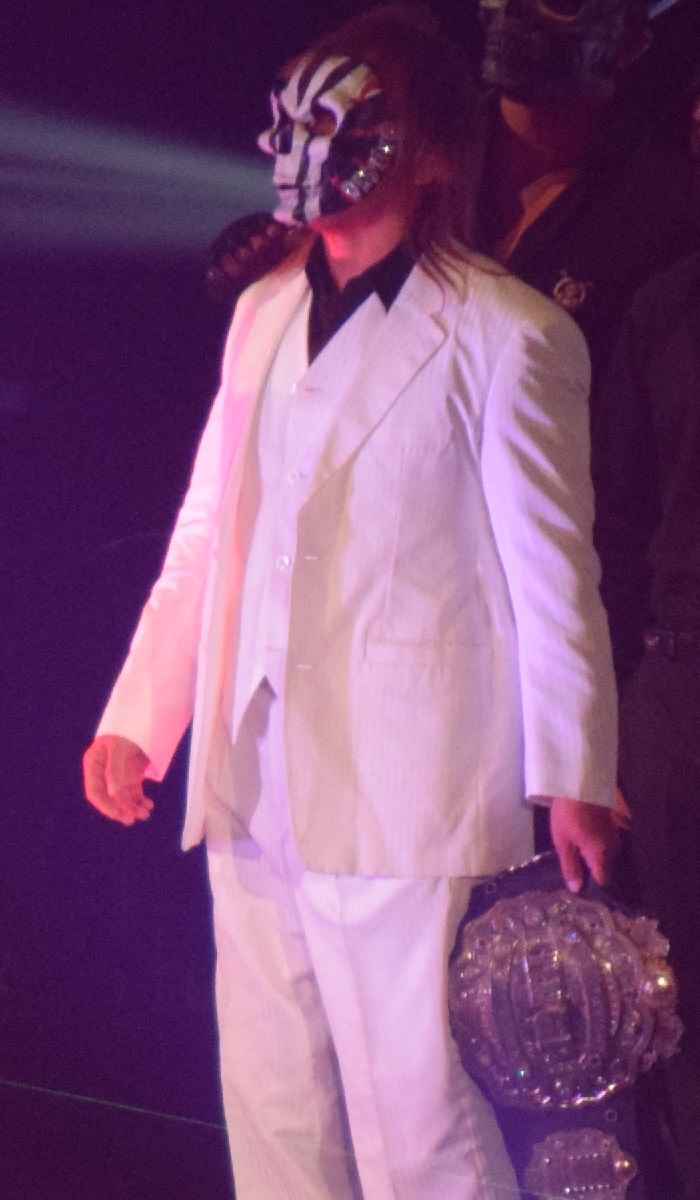
Naito as the IWGP Heavyweight Champion in June 2016

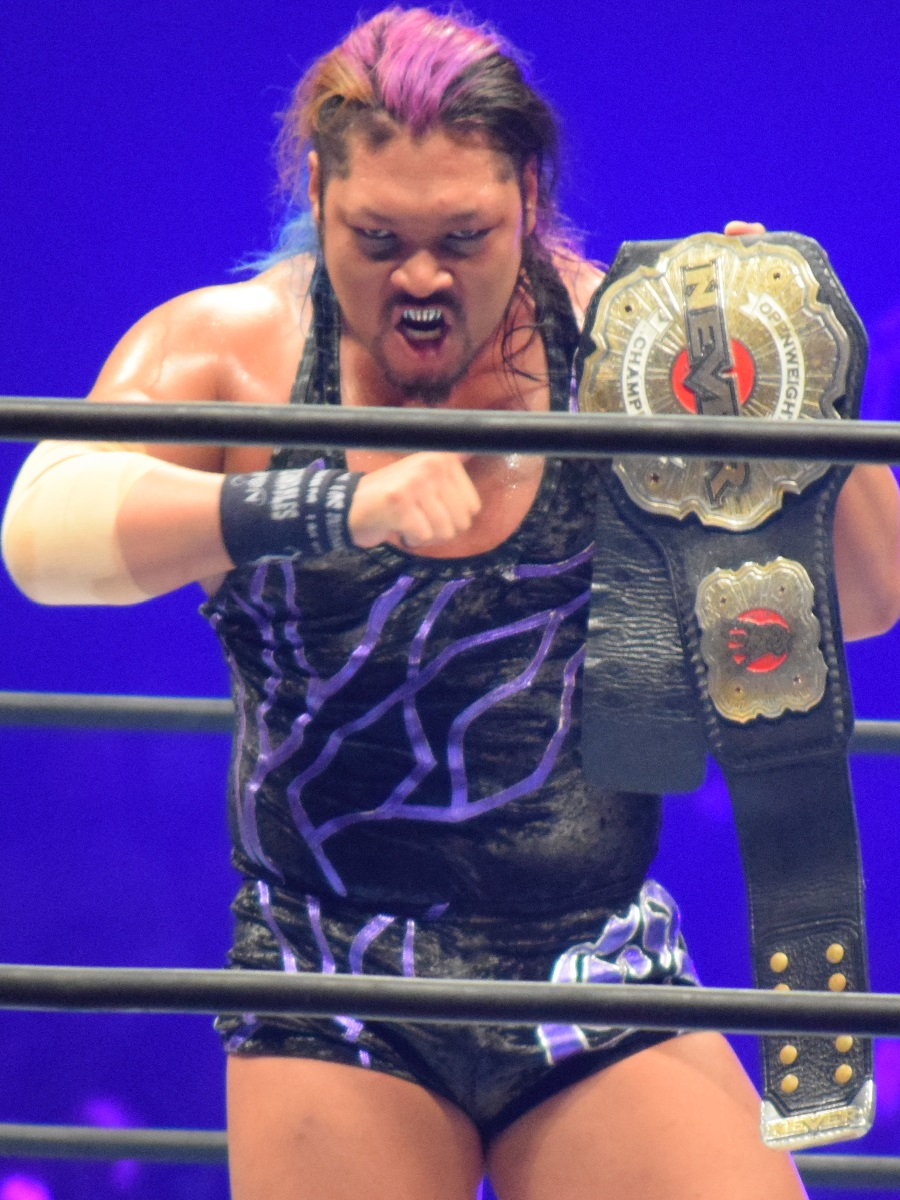
Evil as the NEVER Openweight Champion in November 2016

- Consejo Mundial de Lucha Libre
  - CMLL Universal Championship (1 time) – Titán
  - CMLL World Welterweight Championship (2 times) – Bushi (1) and Titán (1)
- DDT Pro-Wrestling
  - Ironman Heavymetalweight Championship (2 times) – Takahashi
- New Japan Pro-Wrestling
  - IWGP Heavyweight Championship (6 times) – Naito(5) and Takagi(1)
  - IWGP Intercontinental Championship (9 times) – Naito(8) and Takagi(1)
  - IWGP Junior Heavyweight Championship (6 times) – Bushi (1) and Takahashi (5)
  - IWGP Junior Heavyweight Tag Team Championship (1 time) – Bushi and Takagi
  - IWGP Tag Team Championship (4 times) – Evil and Sanada (2) and Naito and Sanada (1) and Naito and Takahashi (1)
  - IWGP United States Heavyweight Championship (1 time) – Sanada
  - IWGP Global Heavyweight Championship (1 time) – Tsuji
  - KOPW (2022) – Takagi
  - NEVER Openweight 6-Man Tag Team Championship (5 times) – Bushi, Evil and Sanada (3), Bushi, Evil and Takagi (1) and Tsuji, Bushi and Takahashi (1)
  - NEVER Openweight Championship (6 times) – Evil (1) and Takagi (5)
  - Best of the Super Juniors (2018, 2020, 2021, 2022) – Takahashi
  - G1 Climax (2017, 2023) – Naito
  - New Japan Cup (2016) – Naito
  - New Japan Cup (2020) – Evil
  - New Japan Cup (2024) – Tsuji
  - New Japan Rambo (2021) – Bushi
  - World Tag League (2017, 2018) – Evil and Sanada
  - World Tag League (2024) – Naito and Takahashi
- Pro Wrestling Illustrated
  - Ranked Naito No. 5 of the top 500 singles wrestlers in the PWI 500 in 2020
  - Ranked Takagi No. 9 of the top 500 singles wrestlers in the PWI 500 in 2021
  - Ranked Takahashi No. 27 of the top 500 singles wrestlers in the PWI 500 in 2018
  - Ranked Sanada No. 42 of the top 500 singles wrestlers in the PWI 500 in 2019
  - Ranked Evil No. 61 of the top 500 singles wrestlers in the PWI 500 in 2019
  - Ranked Titán No. 75 of the top 500 singles wrestlers in the PWI 500 in 2023
  - Ranked Bushi No. 82 of the top 500 singles wrestlers in the PWI 500 in 2016
  - Ranked Tsuji No. 159 of the top 500 singles wrestlers in the PWI 500 in 2023
- Ring of Honor
  - ROH World Championship (1 time) – Lethal
- Tokyo Sports
  - Best Bout Award (2019) – Sanada vs. Kazuchika Okada on October 14 at King of Pro-Wrestling
  - Fighting Spirit Award (2020) – Takahashi
  - MVP Award (2016, 2017, 2020, 2023) – Naito
  - MVP Award (2021) – Takagi
  - Outstanding Performance (2023) - Takahashi
  - Best Bout Award (2024) - Yota Tsuji vs. Hirooki Goto on March 20 at New Japan Cup
- Wrestling Observer Newsletter
  - Best Gimmick (2017) – Bushi, Evil, Naito, Sanada, and Takahashi
  - Japan MVP (2020) – Naito
  - Match of the Year (2019) – Takagi vs. Will Ospreay on June 5 at the Best of the Super Juniors final
  - Most Charismatic (2017, 2018) – Naito

== Notes ==
- Both CMLL and NJPW have referred to the members of Los Ingobernables and Los Ingobernables de Japon as being part of the same group when members were teaming with one another in tag team matches.
