= Wrestling Hinokuni =

- Promotions: New Japan Pro-Wrestling
- First event: Wrestling Hinokuni (2015)
- Last event: Wrestling Hinokuni (2019)

Wrestling Hinokuni (レスリング火の国, Resuringu Hinokuni) is a professional wrestling event promoted by New Japan Pro-Wrestling (NJPW).

The event was established in 2015 and took place in late April between the larger Invasion Attack and Wrestling Dontaku events. The event was held in Mashiki, Kumamoto and its name referred to the nickname of Kumamoto Prefecture, "Land of Fire" (火の国, Hinokuni). The 2016 event was canceled due to the 2016 Kumamoto earthquakes. In 2017, the event was replaced by Wrestling Toyonokuni, taking place in Beppu, Ōita. Wrestling Hinokuni returned in 2018 two years later after the 2016 Kumamoto earthquakes.

== Production ==
The Wrestling Hinokuni events featured professional wrestling matches that involved different wrestlers from pre-existing scripted feuds and storylines. Wrestlers portray villains, heroes, or less distinguishable characters in the scripted events that built tension and culminated in a wrestling match or series of matches.

== Events ==
#	Event	Date	City	Venue	Attendance	Main event	Ref(s)
1	Wrestling Hinokuni (2015)	April 29, 2015	Mashiki, Kumamoto	Grand Messe Kumamoto	2,460	Tomohiro Ishii (c) vs. Togi Makabe for the NEVER Openweight Championship	
2	Wrestling Hinokuni (2016)	April 29, 2016	Mashiki, Kumamoto	Grand Messe Kumamoto	N/A	Kenny Omega (c) vs. Michael Elgin for the IWGP Intercontinental Championship	
3	Wrestling Hinokuni (2018)	April 29, 2018	Mashiki, Kumamoto	Grand Messe Kumamoto	3,435	Minoru Suzuki (c) vs. Tetsuya Naito for the IWGP Intercontinental Championship	
4	Wrestling Hinokuni (2019)	April 29, 2019	Mashiki, Kumamoto	Grand Messe Kumamoto	2,702	Hirooki Goto vs. Jay White	
(c) – refers to the champion(s) heading into the match

== 2015 ==
Wrestling Hinokuni (2015)
- Promotion: New Japan Pro-Wrestling
- Date: April 29, 2015
- City: Mashiki, Kumamoto
- Venue: Grand Messe Kumamoto
- Attendance: 2,460

Event chronology
← Previous; Invasion Attack	Next → Wrestling Dontaku

Wrestling Hinokuni chronology
← Previous; First	Next → 2016

The first Wrestling Hinokuni took place on April 29, 2015, at the Grand Messe Kumamoto in Mashiki, Kumamoto, and aired worldwide on NJPW World. The event featured nine matches, three of which were contested for championships. Wrestlers representing the National Wrestling Alliance (NWA) took part in the event with both the NWA World Heavyweight and NWA World Junior Heavyweight Championships being defended. In the first title match, NWA representative Steve Anthony successfully defended the NWA World Junior Heavyweight Championship against NJPW's Jyushin Thunder Liger. This was a rematch from a match in Las Vegas earlier in the month, where Anthony also defeated Liger to capture the title. The second title match saw NJPW's Hiroyoshi Tenzan make his second successful defense of the NWA World Heavyweight Championship against NWA's Big Daddy Yum-Yum. Several matches at the event also built to matches taking place at Wrestling Dontaku 2015 the following week. One of these matches saw Bullet Club's Doc Gallows, Karl Anderson and Kenny Omega defeat Alex Shelley, Tetsuya Naito and Tomoaki Honma in a six-man tag team match in the buildup to an IWGP Junior Heavyweight Championship match between champion Omega and challenger Shelley.

Another match built to the main event of Wrestling Dontaku 2015, which would see Hirooki Goto challenge Shinsuke Nakamura for the IWGP Intercontinental Championship. At Wrestling Hinokuni 2015, Nakamura, Kazushi Sakuraba and Toru Yano defeated Goto, Hiroshi Tanahashi and Katsuyori Shibata. In the main event of the show, Tomohiro Ishii defended the NEVER Openweight Championship against Togi Makabe. This was a rematch from January's Wrestle Kingdom 9 in Tokyo Dome, where Makabe defeated Ishii to become the new NEVER Openweight Champion. However, on February 14, Makabe was stripped of the title after he was forced to pull out of a scheduled rematch with Ishii due to influenza, which led to Ishii defeating Tomoaki Honma to recapture the now vacant title. The main event saw Makabe again defeat Ishii to win the NEVER Openweight Championship for the second time.

No.	Results	Stipulations	Times
1	Chaos (Beretta, Gedo and Rocky Romero) defeated Jay White, Sho Tanaka and Yohei Komatsu	Six-man tag team match	08:01
2	Bullet Club (Cody Hall and Yujiro Takahashi) defeated Captain New Japan and Satoshi Kojima	Tag team match	08:07
3	Kushida, Manabu Nakanishi and Ryusuke Taguchi defeated Máscara Dorada, Tiger Mask and Yuji Nagata	Six-man tag team match	07:50
4	Steve Anthony (c) defeated Jyushin Thunder Liger	Singles match for the NWA World Junior Heavyweight Championship	12:35
5	Hiroyoshi Tenzan (c) defeated Big Daddy Yum-Yum	Singles match for the NWA World Heavyweight Championship	10:57
6	Bullet Club (Doc Gallows, Karl Anderson and Kenny Omega) defeated Alex Shelley, Tetsuya Naito and Tomoaki Honma	Six-man tag team match	12:50
7	Chaos (Kazuchika Okada and Yoshi-Hashi) defeated Bullet Club (Bad Luck Fale and Tama Tonga)	Tag team match	11:39
8	Chaos (Kazushi Sakuraba, Shinsuke Nakamura and Toru Yano) defeated Hirooki Goto, Hiroshi Tanahashi and Katsuyori Shibata	Six-man tag team match	16:45
9	Togi Makabe defeated Tomohiro Ishii (c)	Singles match for the NEVER Openweight Championship	25:42
(c) / – the champion(s) heading into the match

== 2016 ==
Wrestling Hinokuni 2016
- Promotion: New Japan Pro-Wrestling
- Date: April 29, 2016
- City: Mashiki, Kumamoto
- Venue: Grand Messe Kumamoto

Event chronology
← Previous; Invasion Attack	Next → Wrestling Dontaku

Wrestling Hinokuni chronology
← Previous; 2015	Next → 2018

Wrestling Hinokuni 2016 is a canceled professional wrestling event that was scheduled to take place on April 29, 2016, at the Grand Messe Kumamoto in Mashiki, Kumamoto. The event was set to feature nine matches, three of which were to be contested for championships. The event was to be headlined by Kenny Omega making his first defense of the IWGP Intercontinental Championship against Michael Elgin. This was set up earlier in the month at Invasion Attack 2016, where the two had a heated confrontation after Elgin, Hiroshi Tanahashi and Yoshitatsu had defeated Omega and The Young Bucks (Matt Jackson and Nick Jackson) to win the NEVER Openweight 6-Man Tag Team Championship. Another title match was set to continue a storyline, where Katsuyori Shibata defended the NEVER Openweight Championship against NJPW veterans, known as the "third generation". Having already defended the title against Satoshi Kojima, at Invasion Attack 2016, Shibata successfully defended the title against Hiroyoshi Tenzan and afterwards kicked Yuji Nagata to set him up as his next challenger. The two had previously faced off in August 2014 during the 2014 G1 Climax tournament, where Nagata defeated Shibata.

The event was also scheduled to feature a rematch from Invasion Attack 2016, where the new IWGP Junior Heavyweight Tag Team Champions, Roppongi Vice (Beretta and Rocky Romero), would defend the title against previous champions, Matt Sydal and Ricochet. One of the big non-title matches at Wrestling Hinokuni was set to continue the rivalry between the Chaos and Los Ingobernables de Japón stables as the former's Hirooki Goto, Kazuchika Okada, Tomohiro Ishii and Will Ospreay were set to take on the latter's Bushi, Evil, Sanada and Tetsuya Naito. This match would also build up three matches taking place at Wrestling Dontaku 2016, where Goto was set to take on Evil, Okada take on Sanada and Ishii challenge Naito for the IWGP Heavyweight Championship.

On April 14, Kumamoto was hit with an earthquake, which led to NJPW announcing that they were trying to determine whether they could continue going forward with the show. After another earthquake two days later, NJPW officially canceled the show on April 18. Top matches from the event were later moved to the April 27 Road to Wrestling Dontaku 2016 and May 3 Wrestling Dontaku 2016 events.

No.	Matches*	Stipulations
1	David Finlay vs. Jay White	Singles match
2	Juice Robinson and Manabu Nakanishi vs. Chaos (Kazushi Sakuraba and Yoshi-Hashi)	Tag team match
3	Jyushin Thunder Liger and Tiger Mask vs. Kushida and Ryusuke Taguchi	Tag team match
4	Bullet Club (Tama Tonga, Tanga Loa and Yujiro Takahashi) vs. Togi Makabe, Tomoaki Honma and Yoshitatsu	Six-man tag team match
5	Roppongi Vice (Beretta and Rocky Romero) (c) vs. Matt Sydal and Ricochet	Tag team match for the IWGP Junior Heavyweight Tag Team Championship
6	Chaos (Hirooki Goto, Kazuchika Okada, Tomohiro Ishii and Will Ospreay) vs. Los Ingobernables de Japón (Bushi, Evil, Sanada and Tetsuya Naito)	Eight-man tag team match
7	Katsuyori Shibata (c) vs. Yuji Nagata	Singles match for the NEVER Openweight Championship
8	Bad Luck Fale vs. Hiroshi Tanahashi	Singles match
9	Kenny Omega (c) vs. Michael Elgin	Singles match for the IWGP Intercontinental Championship
(c) / – the champion(s) heading into the match; *Card subject to change

== 2018 ==
Wrestling Hinokuni 2018
- Promotion: New Japan Pro-Wrestling
- Date: April 29, 2018
- City: Mashiki, Kumamoto
- Venue: Grand Messe Kumamoto
- Attendance: 3,435

Event chronology
← Previous; Sakura Genesis; Lion's Gate Project 11	Next → Wrestling Dontaku

Wrestling Hinokuni chronology
← Previous; 2016	Next → 2019

Wrestling Hinokuni 2018 was a professional wrestling event took place on April 29, 2018, at the Grand Messe Kumamoto in Mashiki, Kumamoto. This event makes the return of New Japan Pro Wrestling to Mashiki, Kumamoto after two years.

No.	Results	Stipulations	Times
1	Ren Narita and Yuji Nagata defeated Shota Umino and Tomoyuki Oka	Tag team match	09:41
2	Ryusuke Taguchi, Tiger Mask, Jyushin Thunder Liger, and David Finlay defeated Chaos (Sho, Yoh, and Rocky Romero and Jay White)	Eight-man tag team match	07:18
3	Chaos (Toru Yano and Tomohiro Ishii) defeated Toa Henare and Togi Makabe	Tag team match	07:56
4	Suzuki-gun (Taka Michinoku, Taichi, Takashi Iizuka and Zack Sabre Jr.) defeated Bullet Club (Chase Owens and Yujiro Takahashi) and Golden☆Lovers (Kenny Omega & Kota Ibushi)	Eight-man tag team match	08:51
5	Kushida, Michael Elgin, Juice Robinson and Hiroshi Tanahashi defeated Chaos (Will Ospreay, Yoshi-Hashi, Hirooki Goto and Kazuchika Okada)	Eight-man tag team match	10:13
6	Bushi defeated El Desperado by disqualification	Singles match	09:58
7	Hiromu Takahashi defeated Yoshinobu Kanemaru	Singles match	11:28
8	Los Ingobernables de Japón (Sanada and Evil) (c) defeated K.E.S. (Davey Boy Smith Jr. and Lance Archer)	Tag team match for the IWGP Tag Team Championship	17:58
9	Tetsuya Naito defeated Minoru Suzuki (c)	Singles match for the IWGP Intercontinental Championship	30:22
(c) / – the champion(s) heading into the match

== 2019 ==
Wrestling Hinokuni 2019
- Promotion: New Japan Pro-Wrestling
- Date: April 29, 2019
- City: Mashiki, Kumamoto
- Venue: Grand Messe Kumamoto
- Attendance: 2,702

Event chronology
← Previous; G1 Supercard; Road to Wrestling Dontaku 2019	Next → Road to Wrestling Dontaku 2019

Wrestling Hinokuni chronology
← Previous; 2018	Next → Final

Wrestling Hinokuni 2019 was a professional wrestling event that took place on April 29, 2019, at the Grand Messe Kumamoto in Mashiki, Kumamoto. This event makes the return of New Japan Pro Wrestling to Mashiki, Kumamoto after two years.

No.	Results	Stipulations	Times
1	Tomoaki Honma, Shota Umino and Ren Narita defeated Toa Henare, Yota Tsuji and Yuya Uemura	Six-man tag team match	11:00
2	Jeff Cobb, Yoshi-Hashi, Jyushin Thunder Liger, Tiger Mask and Ryusuke Taguchi defeated Suzuki-gun (Taichi, Minoru Suzuki, Yoshinobu Kanemaru, El Desperado and Taka Michinoku)	Ten-man tag team match	12:42
3	Dragon Lee and Will Ospreay defeated Bullet Club (Taiji Ishimori and Hikuleo)	Tag team match	10:06
4	Bad Luck Fale defeated Mikey Nicholls	Singles match	7:24
5	Juice Robinson defeated Chase Owens	Singles match	8:43
6	Los Ingobernables de Japón (Sanada, Evil, Tetsuya Naito, Bushi and Shingo Takagi) defeated Chaos (Kazuchika Okada, Tomohiro Ishii, Yoh and Sho) and Kota Ibushi	Ten-man tag team match	16:40
7	Guerrillas of Destiny (Tama Tonga and Tanga Loa) (c) (with Jado) defeated The Most Violent Players (Togi Makabe and Toru Yano)	Tag team match for the IWGP Tag Team Championship	14:50
8	Jay White (with Gedo) defeated Hirooki Goto	Singles match	22:59
(c) / – the champion(s) heading into the match
