= Invasion Attack 2015 =

Japanese professional wrestling event

- Promotional poster for the event, featuring A.J. Styles, Kazuchika Okada, Hiroshi Tanahashi, Shinsuke Nakamura and Togi Makabe
- Promotion: New Japan Pro-Wrestling
- Date: April 5, 2015
- City: Tokyo, Japan
- Venue: Ryōgoku Kokugikan
- Attendance: 9,500

Pay-per-view chronology
← Previous; New Japan Cup	Next → Wrestling Hinokuni; Wrestling Dontaku

Invasion Attack/Sakura Genesis chronology
← Previous; 2014	Next → 2016

New Japan Pro-Wrestling events chronology
← Previous; The New Beginning in Osaka	Next → Wrestling Dontaku 2015

Invasion Attack 2015 was a professional wrestling pay-per-view (PPV) event promoted by New Japan Pro-Wrestling (NJPW). The event took place on April 5, 2015, in Tokyo at Ryōgoku Kokugikan and featured nine matches, four of which were contested for championships. In addition to airing worldwide through NJPW's internet streaming site, NJPW World, the event also aired in Japan as a regular PPV through SKY PerfecTV!'s Sukachan service. It was the third event under the Invasion Attack name.

== Production ==
=== Background ===
The event sold out in advance, making it the fastest non-G1 Climax or non-special show to sell out Ryōgoku Kokugikan in more than a decade. Dave Meltzer of the Wrestling Observer Newsletter noted that this spoke volumes as the card was in his mind "not all that loaded" and that none of the "big three" (Hiroshi Tanahashi, Kazuchika Okada, Shinsuke Nakamura) were in the main event. During the event, NJPW experienced technical difficulties with its NJPW World streaming site, leading to many paying viewers worldwide unable to view the event live. NJPW issued an apology for the problems. It was later reported that the problem was caused by an "outside hacker".

=== Storylines ===
Invasion Attack 2015 featured nine professional wrestling matches that involved different wrestlers from pre-existing scripted feuds and storylines. Wrestlers portrayed villains, heroes, or less distinguishable characters in the scripted events that built tension and culminated in a wrestling match or series of matches.

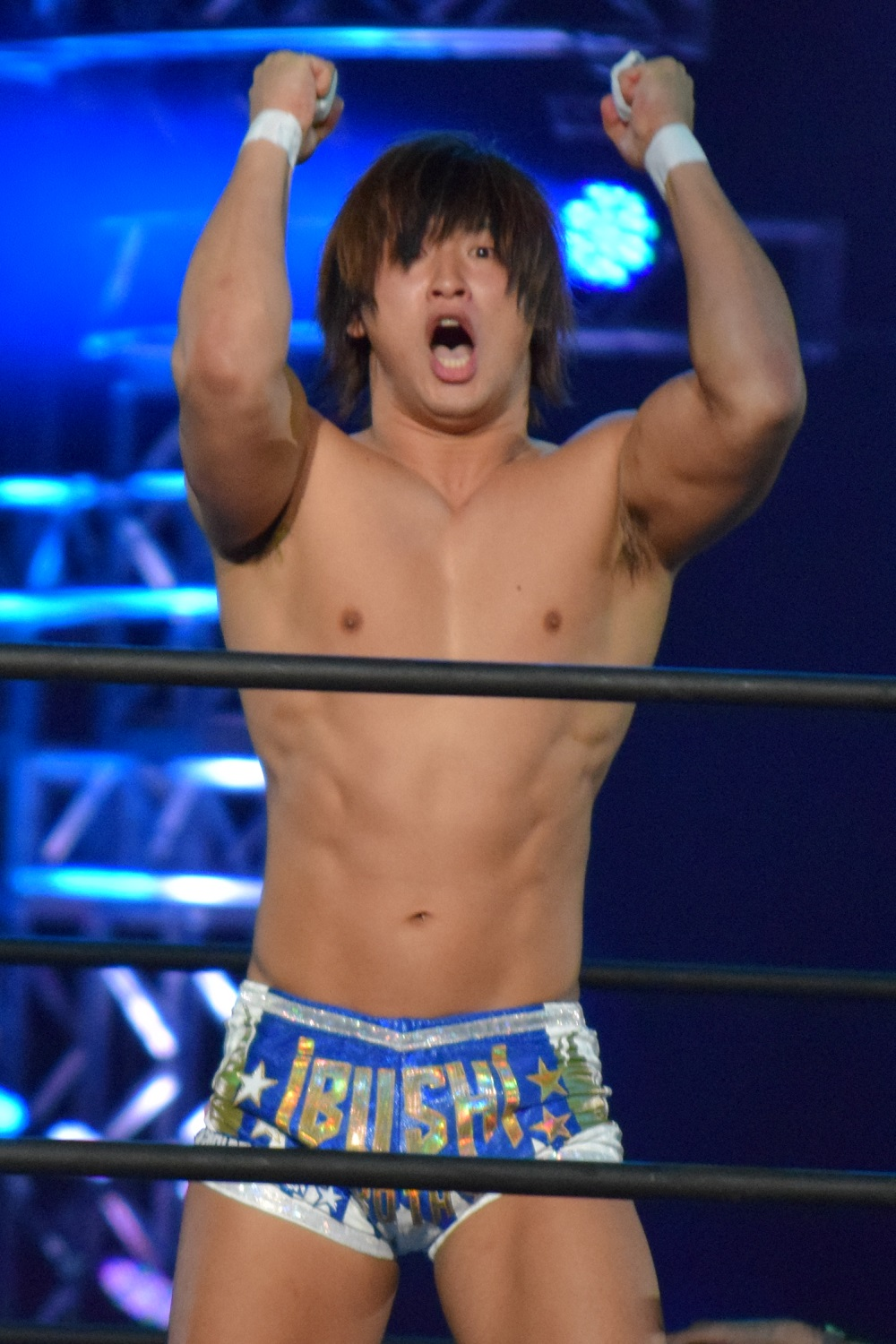
Kota Ibushi, who entered Invasion Attack 2015 as the number one contender to the IWGP Heavyweight Championship after winning the 2015 New Japan Cup

Invasion Attack 2015 was main evented by A.J. Styles defending the IWGP Heavyweight Championship against Kota Ibushi. This marked Ibushi's first ever shot at the title and the first singles match between him and Styles. Ibushi, at that point a former IWGP Junior Heavyweight and IWGP Junior Heavyweight Tag Team Champion, first ventured out of the junior heavyweight division in the summer of 2013, when he took part in the G1 Climax tournament. After signing a contract extension with NJPW in October 2014, it was announced that Ibushi had permanently switched to the heavyweight division. His first big match as a heavyweight wrestler took place on January 4, 2015, at Wrestle Kingdom 9 in Tokyo Dome, where he unsuccessfully challenged Shinsuke Nakamura for the IWGP Intercontinental Championship. Between March 5 and 15, Ibushi took part in the 2015 New Japan Cup and, after victories over heavyweight wrestlers Doc Gallows, Toru Yano, Tetsuya Naito and Hirooki Goto, won the tournament for the first time to earn the right to challenge either for the IWGP Heavyweight, IWGP Intercontinental or NEVER Openweight Championship. Following his win, Ibushi announced his decision to challenge Bullet Club's A.J. Styles for the IWGP Heavyweight Championship. The match was made official the following day.

Another match at Invasion Attack 2015 continued the storyline rivalry between Bad Luck Fale and Kazuchika Okada, which had started at the beginning of the year. After suffering yet another loss against Fale in the opening round of the 2015 New Japan Cup, Okada finally managed to pin his rival in a tag team match on March 15, resulting in a singles rematch at Invasion Attack 2015. New Japan Cup also re-ignited the rivalry between Hiroshi Tanahashi and Toru Yano, with Yano upsetting Tanahashi in the opening round. At Invasion Attack 2015, the two faced off in a tag team match with Yano teaming with his regular tag team partner Kazushi Sakuraba, while Tanahashi formed a new team with Sakuraba's former partner Katsuyori Shibata. The event would also feature a six-man tag team match, where Chaos' Shinsuke Nakamura, Tomohiro Ishii and Yoshi-Hashi take on Hirooki Goto, Tetsuya Naito and Togi Makabe, which built up two more future title matches between Nakamura and Goto for the IWGP Intercontinental Championship and between Ishii and Makabe for the NEVER Openweight Championship.

In addition to the IWGP Heavyweight Championship match, the other three title matches at Invasion Attack 2015 also involved the villainous Bullet Club stable. First, Bullet Club's The Young Bucks (Matt Jackson and Nick Jackson) were set to defend the IWGP Junior Heavyweight Tag Team Championship against Roppongi Vice (Beretta and Rocky Romero). Following Romero's Forever Hooligans partner Alex Koslov stepping away from professional wrestling, Romero announced on March 1 that he was forming a new tag team with Beretta. The team wrestled their first match together for Ring of Honor (ROH) on March 13, which was followed by their NJPW debut on March 22 during the "Road to Invasion Attack 2015" tour. This marked Beretta's return to NJPW, having debuted for the promotion during the 2013 Best of the Super Juniors tournament. The second title match would see Bullet Club's Kenny Omega defend the IWGP Junior Heavyweight Championship against Máscara Dorada. After signing a NJPW contract at the beginning of the year, Dorada quickly entered the IWGP Junior Heavyweight Championship picture by challenging Omega on February 11 and then pinning him in a six-man tag team match three days later. This marked Dorada's first ever shot at the IWGP Junior Heavyweight Championship. The third title match would see Bullet Club's Doc Gallows and Karl Anderson defend the IWGP Tag Team Championship against the ROH tag team The Kingdom (Matt Taven and Michael Bennett). On March 1 at ROH's 13th Anniversary Show, Anderson and Gallows were scheduled to wrestle in a three-way non-title tag team match with The Kingdom and The Addiction (Christopher Daniels and Frankie Kazarian), however, when Gallows was unable to make the event due to travel issues, Anderson was left to wrestle alone and was in the end pinned for the win by The Kingdom. Upon his return to NJPW, Anderson publicly offered The Kingdom a shot at his and Gallows' IWGP Tag Team Championship anytime, anywhere, while also stating that Bullet Club was going to steal Bennett's valet and real-life wife Maria Kanellis away from him. This marked Bennett, Taven and Kanellis' return to NJPW, having worked their first tour with the promotion in late 2014, during the 2014 World Tag League.

== Event ==
In the first title match of Invasion Attack 2015, Roppongi Vice defeated The Young Bucks to become the new IWGP Junior Heavyweight Tag Team Champions, after less than a month of teaming together. Overall, this marked the start of Romero's fifth reign with the title. In the following match, Kenny Omega defended the IWGP Junior Heavyweight Championship against Máscara Dorada. As a sign of the junior heavyweight division's solidarity against Bullet Club, Dorada was accompanied to the ring by six junior heavyweight wrestlers, including the injured Bushi. Despite this, Omega won the match, making his second successful defense of the title and afterwards confronted the other junior heavyweight wrestlers. Omega then stated that after cleaning up Japanese and Mexican "garbage", he now wanted an American, Alex Shelley, who then entered the ring for a staredown with Omega. In the third straight title match featuring members of Bullet Club, the stable lost also their other tag team championship as Doc Gallows and Karl Anderson were defeated by ROH's Matt Taven and Michael Bennett with help from Maria Kanellis distracting Anderson. In the following match, Hirooki Goto pinned Shinsuke Nakamura to win a six-man tag team match, setting himself up as the next challenger for his IWGP Intercontinental Championship. Following the match, Tomohiro Ishii brawled with Togi Makabe, setting up a future NEVER Openweight Championship match between the two.

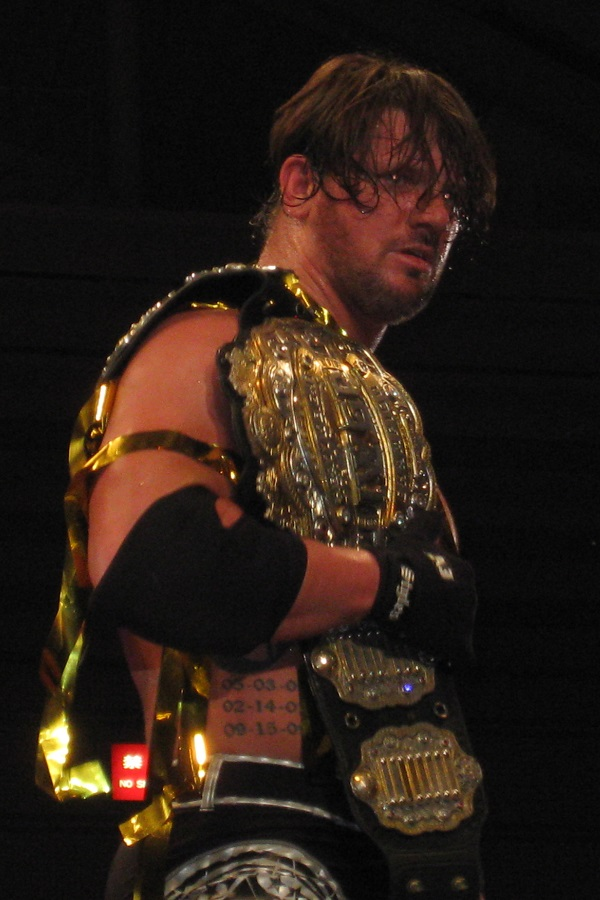
A.J. Styles successfully defended the IWGP Heavyweight Championship in the main event of Invasion Attack 2015

The semi-main event of the evening featured the culmination of a rivalry between Bullet Club's Bad Luck Fale and Chaos' Kazuchika Okada, which saw Okada emerge victorious with NJPW declaring his recent "slump" over. Finally, the main event saw A.J. Styles make the first successful defense of his second IWGP Heavyweight Championship reign by defeating 2015 New Japan Cup winner Kota Ibushi. Part of the story of the match involved Kenny Omega, who accompanied Styles to the ring. Prior to joining Bullet Club, Omega was part of a tag team named Golden☆Lovers with Ibushi. The two held the IWGP Junior Heavyweight Tag Team Championship together, before amicably breaking up, when Ibushi turned heavyweight. In the finish of the match, Omega climbed onto the ring apron and looked like he was going to interfere in the match, but hesitated. Despite not physically interfering in the match, the distraction was enough to jar Ibushi, leading to him jumping directly into Styles' Styles Clash finishing move to end the match. Following the match, Omega looked indifferent to his Bullet Club stablemate retaining his title. The show ended with Okada attacking Styles and posing with his IWGP Heavyweight Championship belt.

== Aftermath ==
The day after Invasion Attack 2015, NJPW announced that the IWGP Heavyweight Championship match between A.J. Styles and Kazuchika Okada would not be taking place at the following big event, Wrestling Dontaku 2015, as speculated, but instead at July's Dominion 7.5 in Osaka-jo Hall, giving the title match a rare three-month build. Instead Wrestling Dontaku 2015 would be main evented by the IWGP Intercontinental Championship match between Shinsuke Nakamura and Hirooki Goto, while Tomohiro Ishii and Togi Makabe's NEVER Openweight Championship match would main event a show on April 29.

== Reception ==
In his review of the event, Dave Meltzer gave the highest rating of four and three quarter stars out of five to the main event match between A.J. Styles and Kota Ibushi, calling it "one of the year's best matches". He also praised both junior heavyweight matches, giving The Young Bucks and Roppongi Vice four stars and Omega and Dorada four and a quarter stars, and the match between Bad Luck Fale and Kazuchika Okada, giving it four stars and writing "Okada has to be one of the best in the world getting this kind of a match out of Fale".

== Results ==
No.	Results	Stipulations	Times
1	Captain New Japan, Time Splitters (Alex Shelley and Kushida), Yohei Komatsu and Yuji Nagata defeated Jyushin Thunder Liger, Manabu Nakanishi, Ryusuke Taguchi, Sho Tanaka and Tiger Mask	Ten-man tag team match	08:14
2	Hiroyoshi Tenzan, Satoshi Kojima and Tomoaki Honma defeated Bullet Club (Cody Hall, Tama Tonga and Yujiro Takahashi) (with Mao)	Six-man tag team match	09:26
3	Roppongi Vice (Beretta and Rocky Romero) defeated The Young Bucks (Matt Jackson and Nick Jackson) (c)	Tag team match for the IWGP Junior Heavyweight Tag Team Championship	12:33
4	Kenny Omega (c) (with Tama Tonga) defeated Máscara Dorada (with Alex Shelley, Bushi, Jyushin Thunder Liger, Kushida, Ryusuke Taguchi and Tiger Mask)	Singles match for the IWGP Junior Heavyweight Championship	12:59
5	The Kingdom (Matt Taven and Michael Bennett) (with Maria Kanellis) defeated Bullet Club (Doc Gallows and Karl Anderson) (c)	Tag team match for the IWGP Tag Team Championship	09:41
6	Hirooki Goto, Tetsuya Naito and Togi Makabe defeated Chaos (Shinsuke Nakamura, Tomohiro Ishii and Yoshi-Hashi)	Six-man tag team match	13:49
7	Kazushi Sakuraba and Toru Yano defeated Hiroshi Tanahashi and Katsuyori Shibata	Tag team match	10:51
8	Kazuchika Okada (with Gedo) defeated Bad Luck Fale (with Tama Tonga)	Singles match	15:59
9	A.J. Styles (c) (with Kenny Omega) defeated Kota Ibushi	Singles match for the IWGP Heavyweight Championship	27:01
(c) / – the champion(s) heading into the match
