= Sakura Genesis 2017 =

2017 New Japan Pro-Wrestling event

- Promotional poster for the event, featuring various NJPW wrestlers
- Promotion: New Japan Pro-Wrestling
- Date: April 9, 2017
- City: Tokyo, Japan
- Venue: Ryōgoku Kokugikan
- Attendance: 10,231

Event chronology
← Previous; New Japan Cup	Next → Lion's Gate Project 4

Sakura Genesis chronology
← Previous; 2016	Next → 2018

New Japan Pro-Wrestling events chronology
← Previous; The New Beginning in Osaka	Next → Wrestling Dontaku 2017

Sakura Genesis 2017 was a professional wrestling event promoted by New Japan Pro-Wrestling (NJPW), which took place on April 9, 2017, in Tokyo at Ryōgoku Kokugikan. The event featured nine matches (in addition to one match on the pre-show), main evented by 2017 New Japan Cup winner Katsuyori Shibata challenging Kazuchika Okada for the IWGP Heavyweight Championship. Previously held under the Invasion Attack name, this marked the first show under the Sakura Genesis name.

== Production ==
=== Background ===
Sakura Genesis 2017 was officially announced on January 4, 2017, during Wrestle Kingdom 11 in Tokyo Dome. This would mark NJPW's first April Ryōgoku Kokugikan show under its new name. The previous events had been held under the name Invasion Attack. The event would air worldwide through NJPW World with English commentary provided by Kevin Kelly and Don Callis.

=== Storylines ===
Sakura Genesis 2017 featured professional wrestling matches that involved different wrestlers from pre-existing scripted feuds and storylines. Wrestlers portrayed villains, heroes, or less distinguishable characters in the scripted events that built tension and culminated in a wrestling match or series of matches.

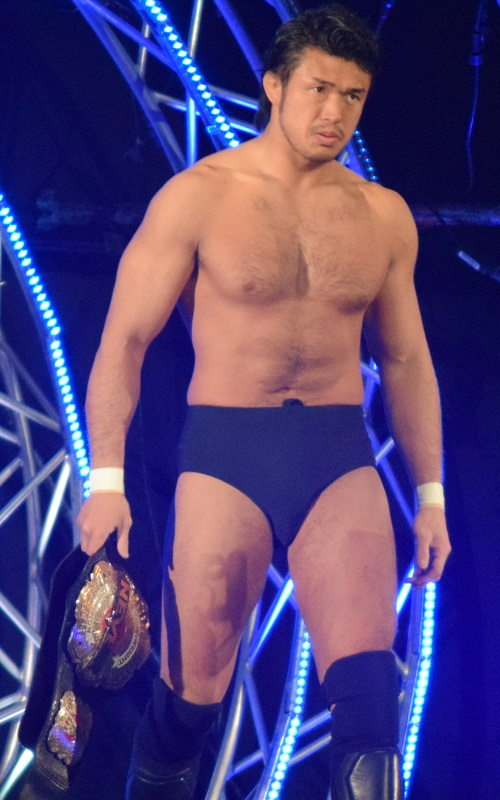
2017 New Japan Cup winner Katsuyori Shibata, who challenged for the IWGP Heavyweight Championship in the main event

Sakura Genesis 2017 was the first major NJPW show following the 2017 New Japan Cup. The New Japan Cup is an annual single-elimination tournament, where the winner gets to choose whether to challenge for the IWGP Heavyweight, IWGP Intercontinental or the NEVER Openweight Championship. Traditionally, the title match has taken place at the April Ryōgoku Kokugikan show, previously known as Invasion Attack and now as Sakura Genesis. On March 20, Katsuyori Shibata defeated Bad Luck Fale in the finals to win the 2017 New Japan Cup. Following the win, Shibata brought up a promise he had made, before announcing his intention of challenging Kazuchika Okada for the IWGP Heavyweight Championship. Shibata's promise harkened back to February 2014 and The New Beginning in Osaka event, where he confronted Okada and challenged him to a title match, which Okada refused, stating that he needed to win the New Japan Cup to earn the right. That day, Shibata promised to win the New Japan Cup and become Okada's next challenger. Although he failed to win the 2014 New Japan Cup, now, three years later, he was a New Japan Cup winner and made the challenge to Okada. The following day, NJPW officially announced the match between Okada and Shibata as the main event of Sakura Genesis 2017, setting the stage for Okada's fourth title defense. This would mark Shibata's first shot at the IWGP Heavyweight Championship since his September 2012 return to NJPW. He previously challenged for the title on July 19, 2004, when he was defeated by the defending champion, Kazuyuki Fujita. This would also mark only the second match between Okada and Shibata with their previous encounter during the 2013 G1 Climax on August 7, 2013, having ended in a victory for Okada.

The semi main event of Sakura Genesis 2017 would see Hiromu Takahashi make his third defense of the IWGP Junior Heavyweight Championship against previous champion Kushida. After capturing the title from Kushida on January 4, 2017, at Wrestle Kingdom 11 in Tokyo Dome, Takahashi successfully defended it against Dragon Lee on February 11 and Ryusuke Taguchi on March 6. Following the March 6 match, Kushida answered an open challenge by Takahashi, asking for a rematch, and followed that up by pinning the champion in a tag team match the following day. On March 21, NJPW announced the rematch between Takahashi and Kushida for Sakura Genesis 2017.

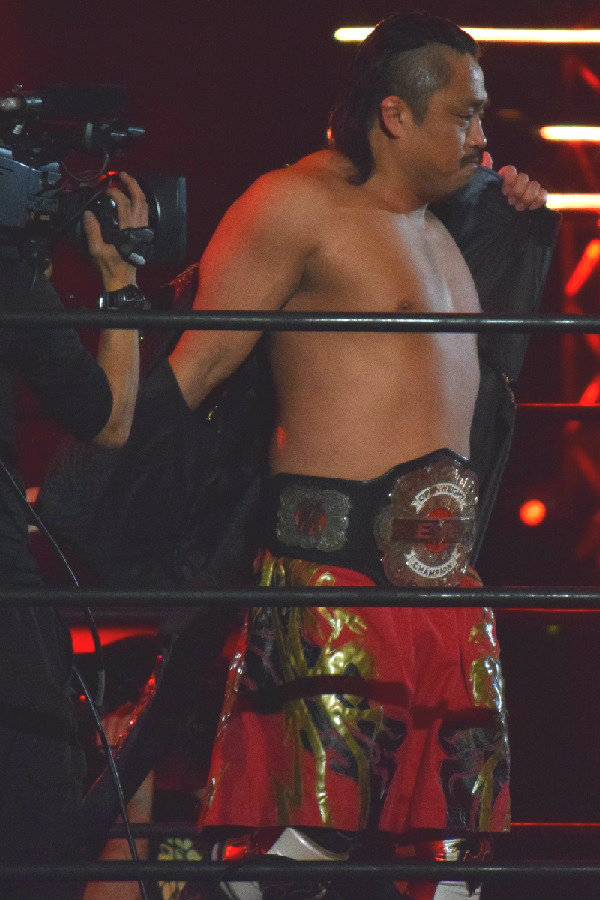
Hirooki Goto, who was set to defend the NEVER Openweight Championship at the event

In the NEVER Openweight Championship match, defending champion Hirooki Goto was set to take on Zack Sabre Jr. in his third defense. Sabre made his NJPW debut on March 6, defeating Katsuyori Shibata with help from Davey Boy Smith Jr. and Minoru Suzuki to capture the British Heavyweight Championship, joining the Suzuki-gun stable in the process. The following day, Sabre pinned Goto in an eight-man tag team match to set himself up as the next challenger for Goto's NEVER Openweight Championship.

Both of NJPW's tag team championships would also be on the line at Sakura Genesis 2017. In the IWGP Tag Team Championship match, defending champions Tencozy (Hiroyoshi Tenzan and Satoshi Kojima) would take on the Ring of Honor (ROH) tag team War Machine (Hanson and Raymond Rowe). War Machine made their NJPW debut in late 2016 during the 2016 World Tag League and put themselves in title contention in February 2017 by defeating The Young Bucks (Matt Jackson and Nick Jackson) and Guerrillas of Destiny (Tama Tonga and Tanga Loa) during the NJPW and ROH co-produced Honor Rising: Japan 2017 shows. Tencozy captured the IWGP Tag Team Championship on March 6 by defeating Tomohiro Ishii and Toru Yano, after stepping in as a late replacement team for Togi Makabe and Tomoaki Honma. Winning the title for the first time in three years and four months, Tencozy vowed to hold and defend the title until Honma was able to return to NJPW from his spinal cord injury. This would mark their first title defense. In the IWGP Junior Heavyweight Tag Team Championship match, Suzuki-gun's Taichi and Yoshinobu Kanemaru were set to make their first title defense against the veteran team Jado & Gedo. The match was initially set up on March 6, when Jado & Gedo saved previous champions Roppongi Vice (Beretta and Rocky Romero) from Taichi and Kanemaru, after the Suzuki-gun duo had defeated them to become the new IWGP Junior Heavyweight Tag Team Champions. On March 20, Jado submitted Taichi in a six-man tag team match and afterwards made a challenge for a title match, which was made official the following day. Jado & Gedo were looking to win the IWGP Junior Heavyweight Tag Team Championship for the first time in ten years.

Other matches at Sakura Genesis 2017 would include Los Ingobernables de Japón (Bushi, Evil, Sanada and Tetsuya Naito) taking on Taguchi Japan (Hiroshi Tanahashi, Juice Robinson, Ricochet and Ryusuke Taguchi) in an eight-man tag team match, which followed Tanahashi, Ricochet and Taguchi defeating Bushi, Evil and Sanada for the NEVER Openweight 6-Man Tag Team Championship on April 4, as well as a tag team match between the Bullet Club duo of Bad Luck Fale and Kenny Omega and the Chaos duo of Tomohiro Ishii and Toru Yano, which stemmed from the New Japan Cup, where Ishii eliminated Omega in the first round and Fale eliminated Yano in the second.

== Event ==
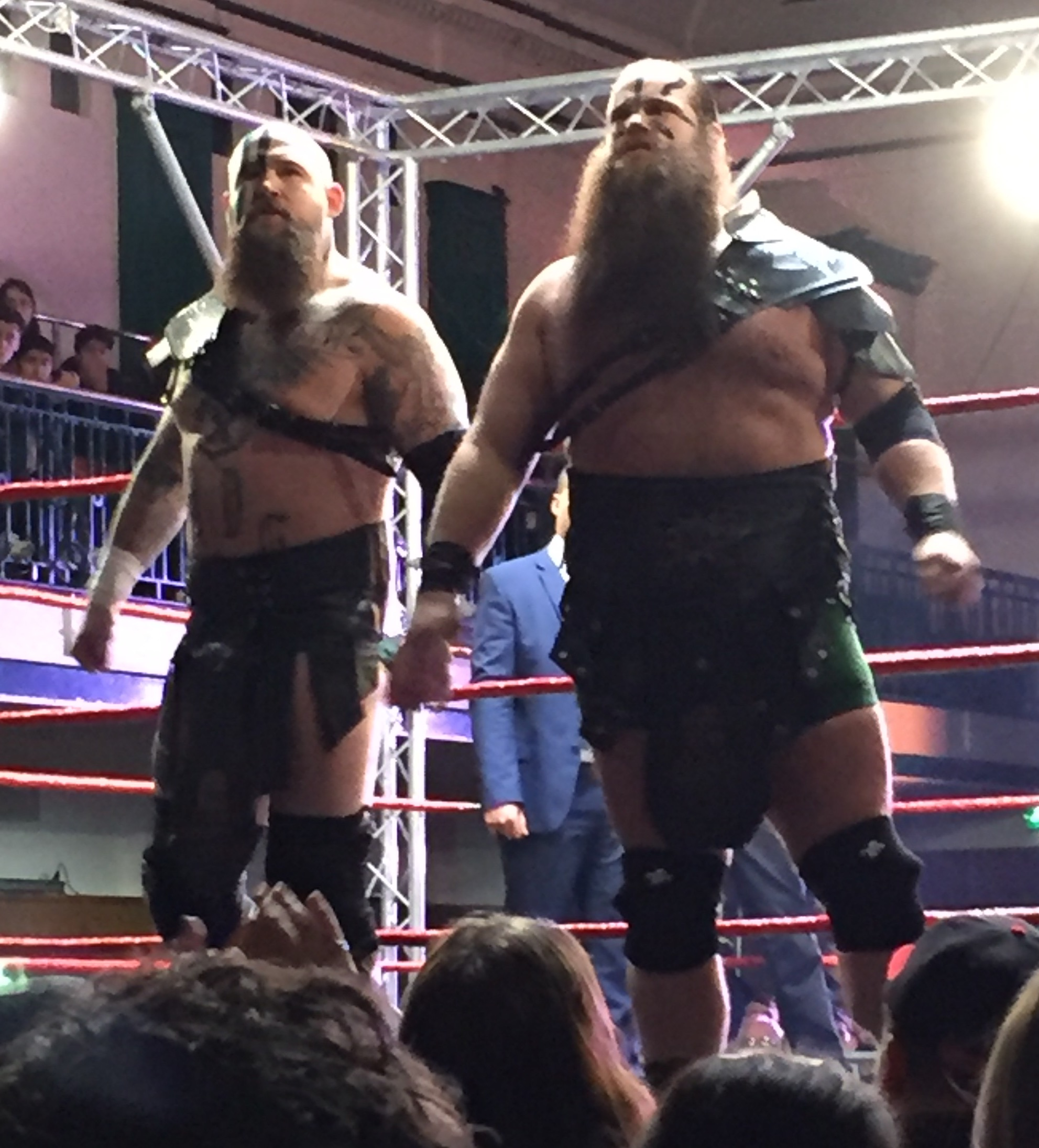
War Machine (Raymond Rowe and Hanson), who captured the IWGP Tag Team Championship in the only title change of the event

In the first title match of the event, Suzuki-gun's Taichi and Yoshinobu Kanemaru made their first successful defense of the IWGP Junior Heavyweight Tag Team Championship against Jado & Gedo with help from their stablemate El Desperado. Afterwards, the champions were challenged by Beretta and Rocky Romero. In the eight-man tag team match between Los Ingobernables de Japón and Taguchi Japan, Juice Robinson picked up the win for Taguchi Japan by pinning IWGP Intercontinental Champion Tetsuya Naito in what was called "the biggest win of his career". Naito, who had entered the match without a clear challenger in sight, was afterwards challenged to a title match by Robinson. The second title match saw War Machine defeat Tencozy to become the new IWGP Tag Team Champions. Afterwards, Tencozy asked for a rematch, which War Machine accepted, shaking hands with the former champions and bowing to them.

In the third title match, Hirooki Goto made his third successful defense of the NEVER Openweight Championship against Zack Sabre Jr., despite outside interference from Sabre's Suzuki-gun stablemates Minoru Suzuki and El Desperado. After the match, Goto brawled with Suzuki, setting up the next title program. The fourth title match saw Hiromu Takahashi defeat Kushida in just 116 seconds to make his third successful defense of the IWGP Junior Heavyweight Championship. Afterwards, Takahashi was challenged by Ricochet. In the main event, Kazuchika Okada made his fourth successful defense of the IWGP Heavyweight Championship against New Japan Cup winner Katsuyori Shibata. Following the match, Okada was attacked and challenged by Bad Luck Fale.

== Reception ==
Following the event, Dave Meltzer of the Wrestling Observer Newsletter called Okada's first months of 2017, which included singles matches with Kenny Omega, Minoru Suzuki, Tiger Mask W and Katsuyori Shibata, "on par with any first four plus months of anyone you'll see", adding that "[t]he big take on all this is Okada has won every match clean, and in every case, the loser has gotten over more just by being in the match". Meltzer also praised Tetsuya Naito and the booking around the match between Los Ingobernables de Japón and Taguchi Japan, stating that Juice Robinson was made a star in one night. Meltzer later gave the main event a full five-star rating. The main event also finished first in the 2017 Voices of Wrestling Match of the Year poll.

== Aftermath ==
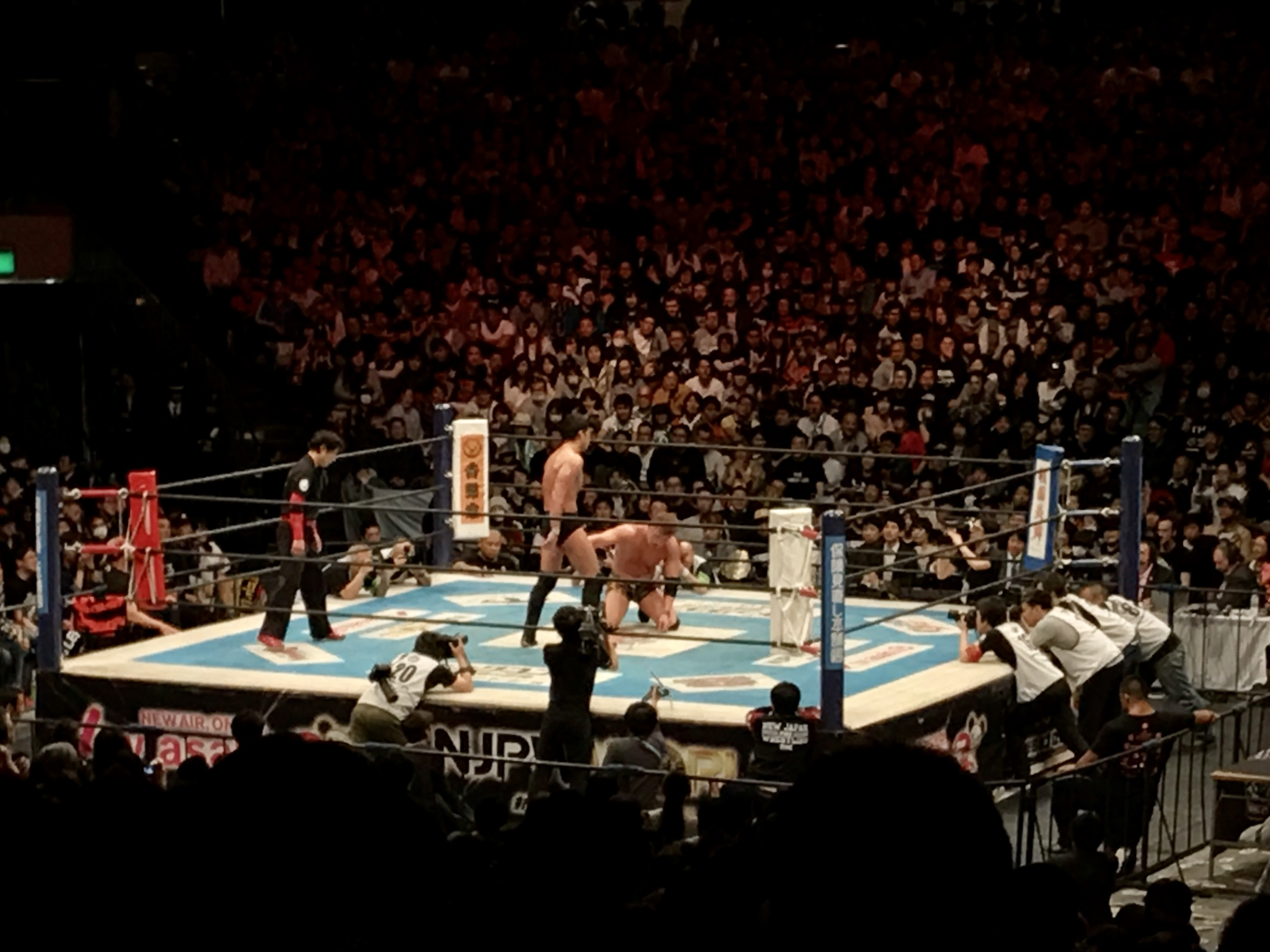
Kazuchika Okada vs. Katsuyori Shibata at Sakura Genesis 2017

During the main event, Katsuyori Shibata delivered a headbutt, which was described as "nasty" and split his head open. After the match, Shibata collapsed backstage and was rushed to a hospital, where it was discovered that he had a subdural hematoma, which required emergency surgery. During the incident, Shibata also experienced some paralysis on his right side. On April 13, Dave Meltzer reported that it was believed that Shibata would never be cleared to wrestle again. Shibata made an emotional surprise appearance at the 2017 G1 Climax finals on August 13, walking to the ring and simply stating "I am alive. That is all". He was described as looking smaller, but healthy. His recovery to the level he had gotten was described as a miracle, but it was still believed he would never wrestle again. At the G1 Climax 31 finals on October 21, 2021, Shibata had an unannounced 5-minute UWF Rules exhibition match with Zack Sabre Jr. which ended in a time limit draw. His first official wrestling match after the injury took place at Wrestle Kingdom 16 on January 4, 2022, nearly five years after his injury.

== Results ==
No.	Results	Stipulations	Times
1^{P}	David Finlay, Jyushin Thunder Liger and Manabu Nakanishi defeated Hirai Kawato, Katsuya Kitamura and Tomoyuki Oka	Six-man tag team match	07:00
2	Bullet Club (Chase Owens, Tama Tonga, Tanga Loa and Yujiro Takahashi) (with Pieter) defeated Tiger Mask, Tiger Mask W, Togi Makabe and Yuji Nagata	Eight-man tag team match	08:40
3	Chaos (Beretta, Rocky Romero and Yoshi-Hashi) defeated Suzuki-gun (El Desperado, Minoru Suzuki and Taka Michinoku)	Six-man tag team match	06:50
4	Suzuki-gun (Taichi and Yoshinobu Kanemaru) (c) (with El Desperado and Miho Abe) defeated Jado & Gedo	Tag team match for the IWGP Junior Heavyweight Tag Team Championship	10:26
5	Bullet Club (Bad Luck Fale and Kenny Omega) defeated Chaos (Tomohiro Ishii and Toru Yano)	Tag team match	10:15
6	Taguchi Japan (Hiroshi Tanahashi, Juice Robinson, Ricochet and Ryusuke Taguchi) defeated Los Ingobernables de Japón (Bushi, Evil, Sanada and Tetsuya Naito)	Eight-man tag team match	11:30
7	War Machine (Hanson and Raymond Rowe) defeated Tencozy (Hiroyoshi Tenzan and Satoshi Kojima) (c)	Tag team match for the IWGP Tag Team Championship	14:06
8	Hirooki Goto (c) defeated Zack Sabre Jr.	Singles match for the NEVER Openweight Championship	16:16
9	Hiromu Takahashi (c) defeated Kushida (with Ryusuke Taguchi)	Singles match for the IWGP Junior Heavyweight Championship	01:56
10	Kazuchika Okada (c) (with Gedo) defeated Katsuyori Shibata	Singles match for the IWGP Heavyweight Championship	38:09
(c) / – the champion(s) heading into the match; P / – the match was broadcast on the pre-show
