= Invasion Attack (2013) =

Professional wrestling event in Japan

- Promotional poster for the event, featuring Togi Makabe, Kazuchika Okada, Hiroshi Tanahashi and Shinsuke Nakamura
- Promotion: New Japan Pro-Wrestling
- Date: April 7, 2013
- City: Tokyo, Japan
- Venue: Ryōgoku Kokugikan
- Attendance: 8,200

Pay-per-view chronology
← Previous; New Japan Cup	Next → Wrestling Dontaku

Invasion Attack/Sakura Genesis chronology
← Previous; First	Next → 2014

New Japan Pro-Wrestling events chronology
← Previous; The New Beginning	Next → Wrestling Dontaku 2013

Invasion Attack was a professional wrestling pay-per-view event promoted by New Japan Pro-Wrestling (NJPW). The event took place on April 7, 2013, in Tokyo at Ryōgoku Kokugikan. The event featured nine matches, five of which were contested for championships.

As part of the "invasion" theme, the event featured title matches involving championships from Consejo Mundial de Lucha Libre (CMLL) and the National Wrestling Alliance (NWA) as well as participation from outside workers Akebono and Bob Sapp. It was the first event under the Invasion Attack name.

== Storylines ==
Invasion Attack featured nine professional wrestling matches that involved different wrestlers from pre-existing scripted feuds and storylines. Wrestlers portrayed villains, heroes, or less distinguishable characters in the scripted events that built tension and culminated in a wrestling match or series of matches.

== Event ==
The first title match, where Time Splitters (Alex Shelley and Kushida) successfully defended the IWGP Junior Heavyweight Tag Team Championship against Apollo 55 (Prince Devitt and Ryusuke Taguchi), led to a major storyline development, when Devitt turned on Taguchi after the match and joined forces with the returning King Fale, now renamed "Bad Luck Fale". The turn led to the formation of Bullet Club later in the year. In the second title match, NJPW wrestler Tama Tonga and CMLL wrestler El Terrible successfully defended the CMLL World Tag Team Championship against the Consejo Mundial de Lucha Libre (CMLL) duo of La Máscara and Valiente. The sixth match of the event, a tag team grudge match between the teams of Hirooki Goto and Yuji Nagata and Laughter7 (Katsuyori Shibata and Kazushi Sakuraba) had to be ended early, when Sakuraba dislocated his right elbow, which would sideline him for the next three months. The event was concluded with what NJPW billed as a "triple main event", featuring three title matches. The third title match of the event featured the NJPW in-ring debut of Rob Conway, who successfully defended the NWA World Heavyweight Championship against Satoshi Kojima. In the fourth title match, Shinsuke Nakamura successfully defended the IWGP Intercontinental Championship against IWGP Tag Team Champion Davey Boy Smith Jr., avenging a first round loss suffered during the 2013 New Japan Cup. In the final match of the evening, the winner of the 2013 New Japan Cup, Kazuchika Okada, defeated Hiroshi Tanahashi to regain the IWGP Heavyweight Championship and start his second reign as the top champion of NJPW. Post-match Okada was challenged by Minoru Suzuki, which led to the main event of Wrestling Dontaku 2013.

== Reception ==
The main event earned a five-star rating from sports journalist Dave Meltzer and was voted the 2013 Match of the Year by readers of his Wrestling Observer Newsletter.

== Results ==
No.	Results	Stipulations	Times
1	Time Splitters (Alex Shelley and Kushida) (c) defeated Apollo 55 (Prince Devitt and Ryusuke Taguchi)	Tag team match for the IWGP Junior Heavyweight Tag Team Championship	10:42
2	Akebono, Hiroyoshi Tenzan, Manabu Nakanishi and Super Strong Machine defeated Bob Sapp and Chaos (Takashi Iizuka, Tomohiro Ishii and Yoshi-Hashi)	Eight-man tag team match	10:00
3	Tama Tonga and El Terrible (c) defeated La Máscara and Valiente	Tag team match for the CMLL World Tag Team Championship	08:57
4	Complete Players (Masato Tanaka and Yujiro Takahashi) defeated G.B.H. (Togi Makabe and Tomoaki Honma)	Tag team match	10:41
5	Minoru Suzuki (with Taichi) defeated Toru Yano	Singles match	10:09
6	Hirooki Goto and Yuji Nagata defeated Laughter7 (Katsuyori Shibata and Kazushi Sakuraba) by referee stoppage	Tag team match	11:32
7	Rob Conway (c) (with Bruce Tharpe and Jax Dane) defeated Satoshi Kojima (with Hiroyoshi Tenzan)	Singles match for the NWA World Heavyweight Championship	14:24
8	Shinsuke Nakamura (c) defeated Davey Boy Smith Jr. (with Lance Archer and Taka Michinoku)	Singles match for the IWGP Intercontinental Championship	18:04
9	Kazuchika Okada (with Gedo) defeated Hiroshi Tanahashi (c)	Singles match for the IWGP Heavyweight Championship	31:41
(c) / – the champion(s) heading into the match
