= Sakura Genesis =

- Promotions: New Japan Pro-Wrestling
- Other names: Invasion Attack (2013-2016)
- First event: Invasion Attack (2013)

Sakura Genesis is an annual professional wrestling event promoted by New Japan Pro-Wrestling (NJPW) since 2013. Held annually at Tokyo's Ryōgoku Kokugikan, the event has been nicknamed "Spring Showdown at Ryōgoku" (春の両国決戦, Haru no Ryōgoku Kessen). Originally known as Invasion Attack, the event was renamed in 2017 after the sakura, in English "cherry blossom", which blooms in early April.

The event follows the New Japan Cup, with the main event being the winner of the New Japan Cup against the champion of their choice, usually being the IWGP Heavyweight Champion. The event was not held in 2019, the NJPW-Ring of Honor co-produced G1 Supercard event was held instead. The event was originally scheduled to take place in 2020 on March 31, but was cancelled due to the COVID-19 pandemic. In 2022, the annual April event in Ryōgoku Kokugikan will not use the Sakura Genesis name, instead using the name Hyper Battle which was the name of series of events from 1993 until 2004, this due NJPW using names from old events for their 50th anniversary.

The event has aired domestically as a pay-per-view (PPV). From 2013 to 2014, the event aired internationally as an internet pay-per-view (iPPV) and since 2015, it has aired worldwide on NJPW's internet streaming site, NJPW World.

== Events ==
#	Event	Date	City	Venue	Attendance	Main event	Ref(s)
1	Invasion Attack (2013)	April 7, 2013	Tokyo, Japan	Ryōgoku Kokugikan	8,200	Hiroshi Tanahashi (c) vs. Kazuchika Okada for the IWGP Heavyweight Championship	
2	Invasion Attack 2014	April 6, 2014	Tokyo, Japan	Ryōgoku Kokugikan	8,500	Hiroshi Tanahashi (c) vs. Shinsuke Nakamura for the IWGP Intercontinental Championship	
3	Invasion Attack 2015	April 5, 2015	Tokyo, Japan	Ryōgoku Kokugikan	9,500	A.J. Styles (c) vs. Kota Ibushi for the IWGP Heavyweight Championship	
4	Invasion Attack 2016	April 10, 2016	Tokyo, Japan	Ryōgoku Kokugikan	9,078	Kazuchika Okada (c) vs. Tetsuya Naito for the IWGP Heavyweight Championship	
5	Sakura Genesis 2017	April 9, 2017	Tokyo, Japan	Ryōgoku Kokugikan	10,231	Kazuchika Okada (c) vs. Katsuyori Shibata for the IWGP Heavyweight Championship	
6	Sakura Genesis 2018	April 1, 2018	Tokyo, Japan	Ryōgoku Kokugikan	9,882	Kazuchika Okada (c) vs. Zack Sabre Jr. for the IWGP Heavyweight Championship	
7	Sakura Genesis 2021	April 4, 2021	Tokyo, Japan	Ryōgoku Kokugikan	4,484	Kota Ibushi (c) vs. Will Ospreay for the IWGP World Heavyweight Championship	
8	Sakura Genesis (2023)	April 8, 2023	Tokyo, Japan	Ryōgoku Kokugikan	6,510	Kazuchika Okada (c) vs. Sanada for the IWGP World Heavyweight Championship	
9	Sakura Genesis (2024)	April 6, 2024	Tokyo, Japan	Ryōgoku Kokugikan	6,632	Tetsuya Naito (c) vs. Yota Tsuji for the IWGP World Heavyweight Championship	
10	Sakura Genesis (2025)	April 5, 2025	Tokyo, Japan	Ryōgoku Kokugikan	6,640	Hirooki Goto (c) vs. David Finlay for the IWGP World Heavyweight Championship	
11	Sakura Genesis (2026)	April 4, 2026	Tokyo, Japan	Ryōgoku Kokugikan		Yota Tsuji (c) vs. Callum Newman for the IWGP Heavyweight Championship	
(c) – refers to the champion(s) heading into the match

== See also ==
- List of New Japan Pro-Wrestling pay-per-view events
