= Sakura Genesis 2021 =

2021 New Japan Pro-Wrestling event

Sakura Genesis
- Promotion: New Japan Pro-Wrestling
- Date: April 4, 2021
- City: Tokyo, Japan
- Venue: Ryōgoku Kokugikan
- Attendance: 4,484

Event chronology
← Previous; NJPW 49th Anniversary Show	Next → Wrestling Dontaku

Sakura Genesis chronology
← Previous; 2018	Next → 2023

Sakura Genesis was a professional wrestling event promoted by New Japan Pro-Wrestling (NJPW). The event took place on April 4, 2021 in Tokyo at Ryōgoku Kokugikan. It was the third event to be held under the Sakura Genesis name, and the first since the 2018 event

Six matches were contested at the event. In the main event, Will Ospreay defeated Kota Ibushi to win the IWGP World Heavyweight Championship. In another prominent match, Roppongi 3K (Sho and Yoh) defeated El Desperado and Yoshinobu Kanemaru to win the IWGP Junior Heavyweight Tag Team Championship for the fifth time.

== Production ==
Other on-screen personnel
Role:	Name:
English Commentators	Kevin Kelly
English Commentators	Chris Charlton
English Commentators	Gino Gambino
Japanese Commentators	Shinpei Nogami
Japanese Commentators	Milano Collection A.T.
Japanese Commentators	Katsuhiko Kanazawa
Japanese Commentators	Kazuyoshi Sakai
Japanese Commentators	Togi Makabe
Japanese Commentators	Miki Motoi
Japanese Commentators	Jushin Thunder Liger
Japanese Commentators	Masahiro Chono
Ring announcers	Makoto Abe
Ring announcers	Kimihiko Ozaki
Referees	Kenta Sato
Referees	Marty Asami
Referees	Red Shoes Unno

=== Background ===
Since 2020, NJPW was unable to run events with a full arena capacity due to COVID-19 restrictions. On January 22, NJPW announced Sakura Genesis for April 4, 2021, making it the first time the event will held since 2018 due to the G1 Supercard taking place instead in 2019 and the 2020 event being cancelled due the COVID-19 pandemic.

=== Storylines ===
Sakura Genesis will feature professional wrestling matches that involve different wrestlers from pre-existing scripted feuds and storylines. Wrestlers portray villains, heroes, or less distinguishable characters in the scripted events that build tension and culminate in a wrestling match or series of matches.

On March 1, NJPW announced that the IWGP Heavyweight and IWGP Intercontinental Championships would be unified to create the new IWGP World Heavyweight Championship with the inaugural champion being decided at 49th Anniversary Show, following the IWGP Heavyweight and IWGP Intercontinental Champion Kota Ibushi defending the titles for the final time against El Desperado in the main event. At the anniversary event Ibushi defeated El Desperado to become the inaugural champion. Ibushi will make his first title defense of the IWGP World Heavyweight Championship at Sakura Genesis against the New Japan Cup winner. On March 21, Will Ospreay defeated Shingo Takagi in the New Japan Cup final to face Ibushi at Sakura Genesis.

== Results ==
No.	Results	Stipulations	Times
1	Suzuki-gun (Douki, Zack Sabre Jr. and Taichi) defeated Bullet Club (Jado, Tama Tonga and Tanga Loa)	Six-man tag team match	10:10
2	Chaos (Yoshi-Hashi, Tomohiro Ishii, Hirooki Goto, Toru Yano and Kazuchika Okada) defeated Bullet Club (Dick Togo, Yujiro Takahashi, Taiji Ishimori, Kenta and Evil)	Ten-man tag team match	11:37
3	United Empire (Great-O-Khan, Jeff Cobb and Aaron Henare) defeated Los Ingobernables de Japón (Tetsuya Naito, Sanada and Shingo Takagi)	Six-man tag team match	9:51
4	Satoshi Kojima and Hiroshi Tanahashi defeated Bullet Club (Jay White and Bad Luck Fale)	Tag team match	10:05
5	Roppongi 3K (Sho and Yoh) defeated Suzuki-gun (El Desperado and Yoshinobu Kanemaru) (c)	Tag team match for the IWGP Junior Heavyweight Tag Team Championship	20:48
6	Will Ospreay defeated Kota Ibushi (c)	Singles match for the IWGP World Heavyweight Championship	30:13
(c) / – the champion(s) heading into the match

== See also ==
- 2021 in professional wrestling
- List of major NJPW events
