= Sakura Genesis (2025) =

2025 New Japan Pro-Wrestling event

- Promotional poster of the event
- Promotion: New Japan Pro-Wrestling
- Date: April 5, 2025
- City: Tokyo, Japan
- Venue: Ryōgoku Kokugikan
- Attendance: 6,640

Event chronology
← Previous; The New Beginning in Osaka	Next → Windy City Riot

Sakura Genesis chronology
← Previous; 2024	Next → 2026

Sakura Genesis was a professional wrestling event promoted by New Japan Pro-Wrestling (NJPW). The event took place on April 5, 2025, in Tokyo at Ryōgoku Kokugikan. Previously held under the Invasion Attack name, this was the sixth event to be held under the Sakura Genesis name.

== Production ==
=== Storylines ===
Sakura Genesis will feature professional wrestling matches that involve different wrestlers from pre-existing scripted feuds and storylines. Wrestlers portray villains, heroes, or less distinguishable characters in the scripted events that build tension and culminate in a wrestling match or series of matches.

On March 20, 2025, David Finlay would win the New Japan Cup by defeating Shota Umino in the finals, allowing Finlay to challenge Hirooki Goto for the IWGP World Heavyweight Championship at Sakura Genesis.

=== Event ===
The event started with the preshow singles confrontation between Daiki Nagai and Katsuya Murashima solded with the victory of the latter.

In the first main card bout, Yuya Uemura defeated Sanada in singles competition. Next up, Great-O-Khan defeated El Phantasmo to win the NJPW World Television Championship, ending the latter's reign at 91 days and four defenses. The third bout saw Shota Umino picking up a victory over Hiroshi Tanahashi in singles competition. Next up, Ren Narita, Sho and Yujiro Takahashi defeated Gabe Kidd, Drilla Moloney and Taiji Ishimori to secure the first successful defense of the NEVER Openweight 6-Man Tag Team Championship. Sanada turned on the War Dogs by attacking Moloney mid match and joined House of Torture, thus handing the latter team the win. Next up, Konosuke Takeshita defeated Ryohei Oiwa to secure the fifth consecutive defense of the NEVER Openweight Championship in that respective reign. The seventh bout saw Jeff Cobb and Callum Newman defeat Tetsuya Naito and Hiromu Takahashi to win the IWGP Tag Team Championship, ending the latter teams' reign at 53 days and no defenses. In the semi main event, Yota Tsuji defeated Evil to secure the third consecutive defense of the IWGP Global Heavyweight Championship in that respective reign. Yuya Uemura stepped up as Tsuji's next challenger after the bout concluded.

In the main event, Hirooki Goto defeated 2025 New Japan Cup winner David Finlay to secure the third consecutive defense of the IWGP World Heavyweight Championship in that respective reign. After the bout concluded, Shota Umino challenged Goto for a title match which was set to occur at Windy City Riot one week after the event.

== Results ==
No.	Results	Stipulations	Times
1^{P}	Katsuya Murashima defeated Daiki Nagai by submission	Singles match	8:13
2	Yuya Uemura defeated Sanada by submission	Singles match	10:26
3	Great-O-Khan defeated El Phantasmo (c) by countout	Singles match for the NJPW World Television Championship	11:09
4	Shota Umino defeated Hiroshi Tanahashi by pinfall	Singles match	12:47
5	House of Torture (Ren Narita, Sho and Yujiro Takahashi) (c) defeated Bullet Club War Dogs (Gabe Kidd, Drilla Moloney and Taiji Ishimori) by pinfall	Six-man tag team match for the NEVER Openweight 6-Man Tag Team Championship	7:30
6	Konosuke Takeshita (c) defeated Ryohei Oiwa by pinfall	Singles match for the NEVER Openweight Championship	12:54
7	United Empire (Jeff Cobb and Callum Newman) defeated Los Ingobernables de Japon (Tetsuya Naito and Hiromu Takahashi) (c) by pinfall	Tag team match for the IWGP Tag Team Championship	10:45
8	Yota Tsuji (c) defeated Evil by pinfall	Singles match for the IWGP Global Heavyweight Championship	21:24
9	Hirooki Goto (c) defeated David Finlay by pinfall	Singles match for the IWGP World Heavyweight Championship	24:21
(c) / – the champion(s) heading into the match; P / – the match was broadcast on the pre-show

== See also ==
- 2025 in professional wrestling
- List of major NJPW events
