= Invasion Attack 2014 =

- Promotional poster for the event, featuring Tetsuya Naito, Kazuchika Okada, Hiroshi Tanahashi and Shinsuke Nakamura
- Promotion: New Japan Pro-Wrestling
- Date: April 6, 2014
- City: Tokyo, Japan
- Venue: Ryōgoku Kokugikan
- Attendance: 8,500

Pay-per-view chronology
← Previous; Road to Invasion Attack	Next → Wrestling Dontaku

Invasion Attack/Sakura Genesis chronology
← Previous; 2013	Next → 2015

New Japan Pro-Wrestling events chronology
← Previous; The New Beginning in Osaka	Next → Wrestling Dontaku 2014

Invasion Attack 2014 was a professional wrestling pay-per-view (PPV) event promoted by New Japan Pro-Wrestling (NJPW). The event took place on April 6, 2014, in Tokyo at Ryōgoku Kokugikan. The event featured nine matches, five of which were contested for championships. It was the second event under the Invasion Attack name.

== Storylines ==
Invasion Attack 2014 featured nine professional wrestling matches that involved different wrestlers from pre-existing scripted feuds and storylines. Wrestlers portrayed villains, heroes, or less distinguishable characters in the scripted events that built tension and culminated in a wrestling match or series of matches.

== Event ==
In the first title match, The Young Bucks (Matt Jackson and Nick Jackson) defended the IWGP Junior Heavyweight Tag Team Championship against El Desperado and Kota Ibushi. El Desperado and Ibushi had faced off in an IWGP Junior Heavyweight Championship match at February's The New Beginning in Osaka, where, following Ibushi's win, he was challenged by Nick Jackson. This led to a singles title match between the two for April 3, where Ibushi was victorious, and a tag team title match three days later, where The Young Bucks made their third successful title defense. In the second title match, Tencozy (Hiroyoshi Tenzan and Satoshi Kojima) won the NWA World Tag Team Championship for the first time, defeating the returning National Wrestling Alliance (NWA) team The IronGodz (Jax Dane and Rob Conway).

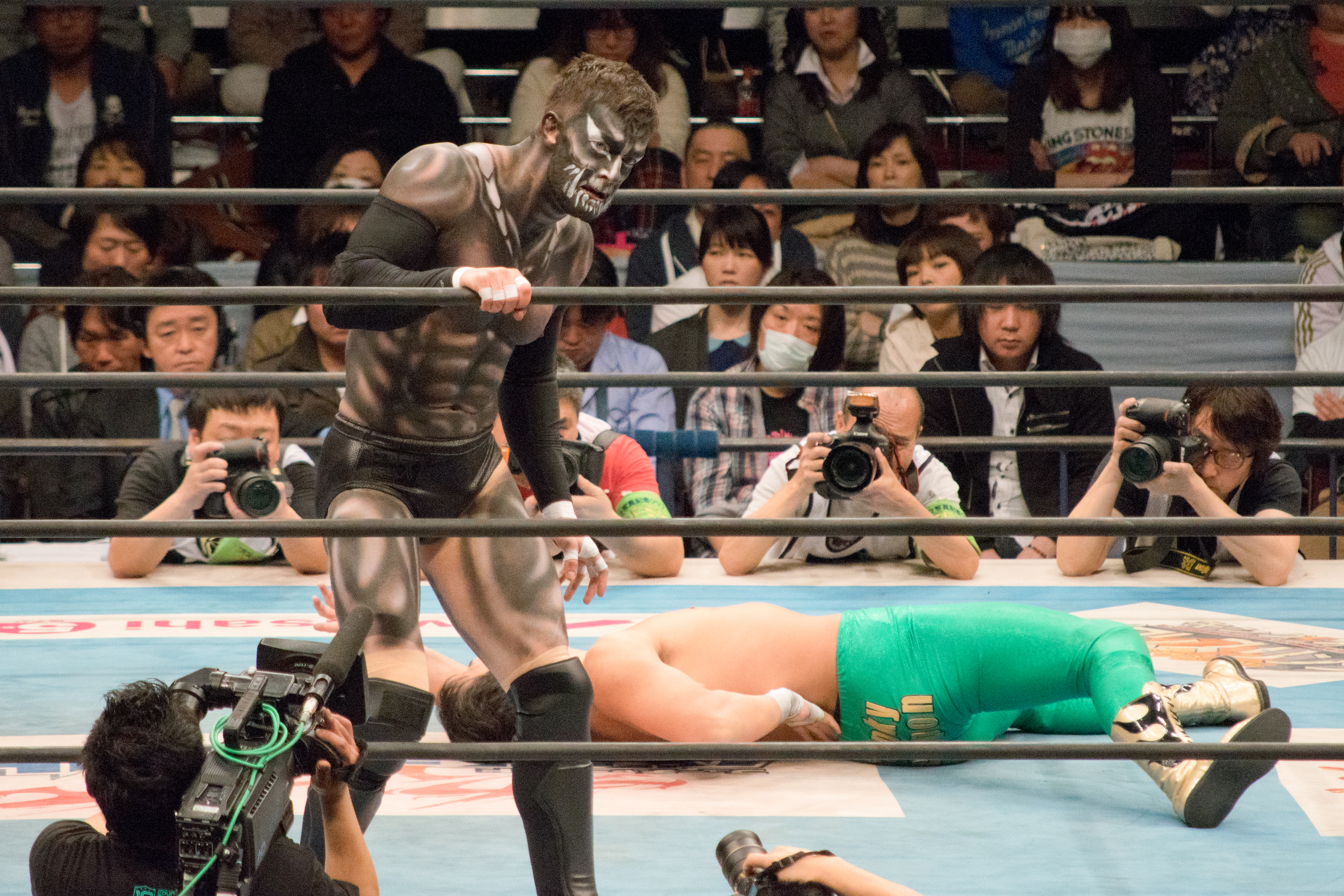
Prince Devitt and Ryusuke Taguchi at Invasion Attack 2014 in what would turn out to be Devitt's final NJPW match

The midcard of the event featured a major storyline development involving the Bullet Club stable. One year after the break-up of Apollo 55, Bullet Club leader Prince Devitt and Ryusuke Taguchi faced off in a singles grudge match, during which The Young Bucks turned on Devitt, after he told them not to interfere in the match. After Taguchi had won the match, he and Devitt shook hands and ended their storyline rivalry with each other. After the following match, A.J. Styles debuted as the newest member of Bullet Club, attacking IWGP Heavyweight Champion Kazuchika Okada.

The third title match saw Tomohiro Ishii defend the NEVER Openweight Championship against Tetsuya Naito. Following The New Beginning in Osaka, where Ishii defeated Naito to win the title, Naito had avenged the loss by defeating Ishii in both the first round of the 2014 New Japan Cup and a six-man tag team match, which set up the title rematch, where Ishii made his first successful defense. Following his win, Ishii was challenged by Kushida. The semi-main event featured Bullet Club representatives Doc Gallows and Karl Anderson defending the IWGP Tag Team Championship against Hirooki Goto and Katsuyori Shibata. The two teams previously faced off in a non-title match on March 5 at NJPW's 42nd anniversary event, where Goto and Shibata were victorious. In addition, Goto and Shibata eliminated both Gallows and Anderson from the 2014 New Japan Cup in their first round matches. Anderson and Gallows, however, were victorious in the title match, making their second successful defense. Finally, in the main event, Hiroshi Tanahashi defended the IWGP Intercontinental Championship against previous champion Shinsuke Nakamura in a rematch of both January's Wrestle Kingdom 8 in Tokyo Dome and February's The New Beginning in Hiroshima. Nakamura had earned the right to challenge for either the IWGP Intercontinental or the IWGP Heavyweight Championship after winning the 2014 New Japan Cup, but opted to try to end his two-match losing streak against Tanahashi. In the end, Nakamura was victorious, winning the IWGP Intercontinental Championship for the third time. Post-match, Nakamura was challenged by Daniel and Rolles Gracie, while Kazushi Sakuraba offered to form a tag team with him.

== Aftermath ==
The day after Invasion Attack 2014, NJPW announced Prince Devitt's resignation from the promotion, while also naming Ryusuke Taguchi and A.J. Styles the number one contenders to the IWGP Junior Heavyweight and Heavyweight Championships, respectively.

== Results ==
No.	Results	Stipulations	Times
1	The Young Bucks (Matt Jackson and Nick Jackson) (c) defeated Shinsei Tag (El Desperado and Kota Ibushi)	Tag team match for the IWGP Junior Heavyweight Tag Team Championship	11:47
2	Kazushi Sakuraba, Togi Makabe and Yuji Nagata defeated Suzuki-gun (Minoru Suzuki, Taichi and Taka Michinoku)	Six-man tag team match	09:39
3	Tencozy (Hiroyoshi Tenzan and Satoshi Kojima) defeated The IronGodz (Jax Dane and Rob Conway) (c) (with Bruce Tharpe)	Tag team match for the NWA World Tag Team Championship	10:36
4	Gracie Ichizoku (Daniel Gracie and Rolles Gracie) defeated Crazy Ichizoku (Takashi Iizuka and Toru Yano)	Ishu kakutōgi sen rules tag team match	06:56
5	Ryusuke Taguchi defeated Prince Devitt	Singles match	12:03
6	Chaos (Kazuchika Okada and Yoshi-Hashi) defeated Bullet Club (Bad Luck Fale and Tama Tonga)	Tag team match	08:43
7	Tomohiro Ishii (c) defeated Tetsuya Naito	Singles match for the NEVER Openweight Championship	17:45
8	Bullet Club (Doc Gallows and Karl Anderson) (c) defeated Meiyu Tag (Hirooki Goto and Katsuyori Shibata)	Tag team match for the IWGP Tag Team Championship	18:31
9	Shinsuke Nakamura defeated Hiroshi Tanahashi (c)	Singles match for the IWGP Intercontinental Championship	26:49
(c) / – the champion(s) heading into the match
