= Wrestle Kingdom 8 =

2014 New Japan Pro-Wrestling event

- Promotional poster for the event, featuring caricatures of various NJPW wrestlers
- Promotion: New Japan Pro-Wrestling
- Date: January 4, 2014
- City: Tokyo, Japan
- Venue: Tokyo Dome
- Attendance: 35,000

Pay-per-view chronology
← Previous; World Tag League	Next → New Year Dash!!

Wrestle Kingdom chronology
← Previous; 7	Next → 9

New Japan Pro-Wrestling events chronology
← Previous; Power Struggle	Next → The New Beginning in Hiroshima

Wrestle Kingdom 8 in Tokyo Dome was a professional wrestling pay-per-view (PPV) event produced by the New Japan Pro-Wrestling (NJPW) promotion, which took place at the Tokyo Dome in Tokyo, Japan on January 4, 2014. It was the 23rd January 4 Tokyo Dome Show and the eighth held under the "Wrestle Kingdom" name. Like the previous year, the event aired worldwide on internet pay-per-view (iPPV).

The event featured ten matches, six of which were contested for championships. For the first time in twenty years, the National Wrestling Alliance (NWA) World Heavyweight Championship was defended during the event with NWA representative Rob Conway defending against Satoshi Kojima. The event was headlined by a double main event; Shinsuke Nakamura defending the IWGP Intercontinental Championship against Hiroshi Tanahashi and Kazuchika Okada defending the IWGP Heavyweight Championship against the winner of the 2013 G1 Climax, Tetsuya Naito. A fan vote decided the order in which the two matches took place during the event; the Heavyweight Championship match went first and the Intercontinental Championship match was the final match of the event. The event also featured outside participation from Wrestle-1 representative Keiji Mutoh, who worked under his Great Muta character. The event also featured appearances by Harley Race, Marty Friedman and Stan Hansen.

== Production ==
Other on-screen personnel
Role:	Name:
Commentators	Jim Ross (English-language announcer)
Commentators	Matt Striker (English-language announcer)
Ring announcers	Makoto Abe
Referees	Kenta Sato
Referees	Marty Asami
Referees	Red Shoes Unno
Referees	Tiger Hattori

=== Background ===
In addition to airing on traditional pay-per-view (PPV) in Japan, the event also aired worldwide on internet pay-per-view (iPPV) through Niconico and Ustream.

=== Storylines ===
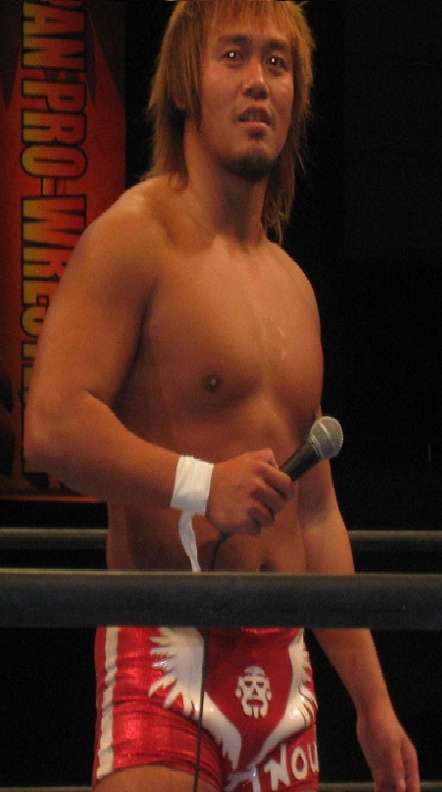
Tetsuya Naito, who was slated to headline Wrestle Kingdom 8, but ultimately lost the spot due to his inability to connect with NJPW fans

Wrestle Kingdom 8 featured eleven professional wrestling matches that involved different wrestlers from pre-existing scripted feuds and storylines. Wrestlers portrayed villains, heroes, or less distinguishable characters in the scripted events that built tension and culminated in a wrestling match or series of matches.

On August 11, 2013, Tetsuya Naito defeated Hiroshi Tanahashi in the finals to win the 2013 G1 Climax. The following day, Naito was given a contract granting him a shot at the IWGP Heavyweight Championship in the main event of Wrestle Kingdom 8. Despite being a clean cut babyface, Naito was thoroughly disliked by NJPW fans, which led to NJPW changing their course of action, announcing a fan vote to decide whether the match between him and Okada or an IWGP Intercontinental Championship match between Shinsuke Nakamura and Hiroshi Tanahashi would main event Wrestle Kingdom 8. Nakamura and Tanahashi won the vote with Naito and Okada being demoted to the semi-main event.

The event was also set to feature Hirooki Goto's return match against Katsuyori Shibata. Goto had broken his jaw during the previous summer's G1 Climax tournament and made a surprise appearance on December 8 to request Shibata as his opponent in his return match at Wrestle Kingdom 8. The two former high school classmates had faced off three times since May 2013 with two matches ending in draws and Shibata winning once. They were scheduled to wrestle again during the G1 Climax, but Goto had to pull out of the tournament with his injury just prior to the match taking place.

On October 14, 2013, mixed martial artists Daniel Gracie and Rolles Gracie appeared at King of Pro-Wrestling, announcing they would take part in Wrestle Kingdom 8. Later in the event, Kazushi Sakuraba and Yuji Nagata, after their match against each other, accepted the Gracies' challenge for a tag team match at Wrestle Kingdom 8. Sakuraba had previously created a name for himself on the mixed martial arts scene as the "Gracie Hunter".

== Event ==
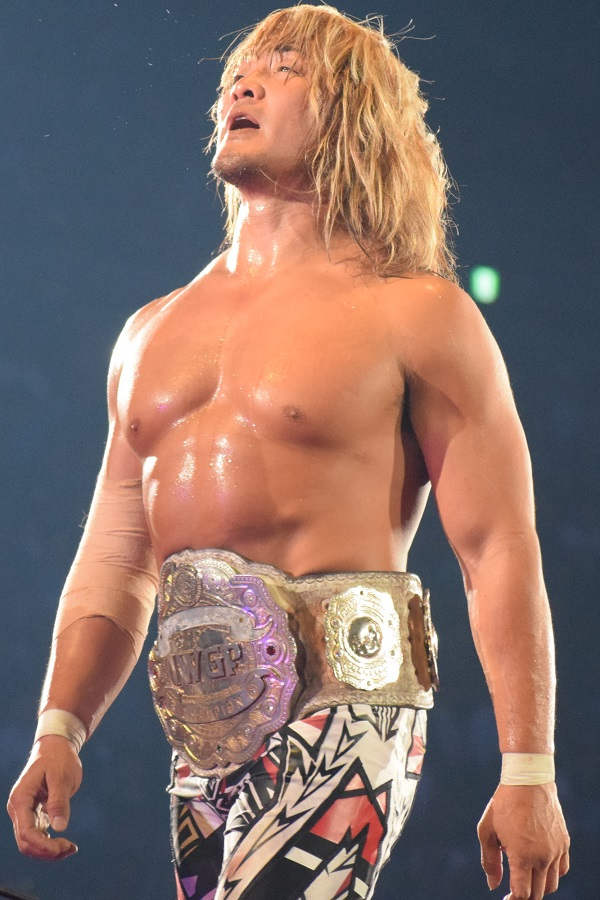
Hiroshi Tanahashi, who captured the IWGP Intercontinental Championship in the final match of the event

Wrestle Kingdom 8 was headlined by a "double main event", featuring Kazuchika Okada defending the IWGP Heavyweight Championship against Tetsuya Naito and Shinsuke Nakamura defending the IWGP Intercontinental Championship against Hiroshi Tanahashi. In the first of the main events, Okada made his seventh successful defense of the IWGP Heavyweight Championship against Naito, while the second main event saw Tanahashi defeat Nakamura to become the new IWGP Intercontinental Champion.

The event also saw Kota Ibushi defeat Prince Devitt to become the new IWGP Junior Heavyweight Champion. Devitt wrestled the match covered in face and bodypaint, debuting what would later become his signature big match look and part of his "Demon" persona. After the match, Ibushi was approached by an unknown masked man, later identified as El Desperado, who handed him a bouquet of roses. In his return match, Hirooki Goto defeated Katsuyori Shibata, who afterwards helped him backstage.

Other title matches included Satoshi Kojima defeat National Wrestling Alliance (NWA) representative Rob Conway to capture the NWA World Heavyweight Championship in a match that featured an appearance by Harley Race. This marked the first time the NWA title had changed hands in Japan since March 2002. Bullet Club's Doc Gallows and Karl Anderson, the winners of the 2013 World Tag League, defeated the Killer Elite Squad (Davey Boy Smith Jr. and Lance Archer) with help from their stablemate Tama Tonga to become the new IWGP Tag Team Champions, while The Young Bucks (Matt Jackson and Nick Jackson) successfully defended the IWGP Junior Heavyweight Tag Team Championship in a four-way match.

== Reception ==
Dave Meltzer of the Wrestling Observer Newsletter wrote that "by most normal standards, the show was very good", but felt that it did not match the previous year's show, which he called "among the greatest wrestling events of all-time". He praised the final four matches, giving both of the main events four and a quarter stars out of five, while calling the first half "not good" and the tag team match involving the Gracies "kind of an atrocity". In his review of the show, James Caldwell of Pro Wrestling Torch wrote that "[t]he big matches delivered, the undercard was hit-or-miss, and the event production was top-notch".

== Aftermath ==
Tetsuya Naito used the snub he suffered at Wrestle Kingdom 8 to turn heel and form the Los Ingobernables de Japón stable. When he finally won the IWGP Heavyweight Championship from Okada in April 2016 at Invasion Attack, Naito had managed to turn his career around and was now fully embraced by the NJPW fans. There was another rematch between the two at Wrestle Kingdom 12 on January 4, 2018, with the same result as Okada retained against Naito. 2 years later, in the main event of night 2 of Wrestle Kingdom 14, IWGP Intercontinental Champion Naito defeated IWGP Heavyweight Champion Okada in a Double Gold Dash match for both of the championships.

On the following months after his defeat to Hiroshi Tanahashi, Shinsuke Nakamura would go on to win that year's New Japan Cup and challenge Tanahashi for a rematch in Invasion Attack 2014 and would win the intercontinental title again.

== Results ==
No.	Results	Stipulations	Times
1^{D}	Bushi, Captain New Japan, Hiroyoshi Tenzan and Tomoaki Honma defeated Jushin Thunder Liger, Manabu Nakanishi, Super Strong Machine and Yohei Komatsu	Eight-man tag team match	08:11
2	The Young Bucks (Matt Jackson and Nick Jackson) (c) defeated Forever Hooligans (Alex Koslov and Rocky Romero), Suzuki-gun (Taichi and Taka Michinoku) and Time Splitters (Alex Shelley and Kushida)	Four-way tag team match for the IWGP Junior Heavyweight Tag Team Championship	10:35
3	Bullet Club (Doc Gallows and Karl Anderson) (with Tama Tonga) defeated K.E.S. (Davey Boy Smith Jr. and Lance Archer) (c)	Tag team match for the IWGP Tag Team Championship	10:27
4	Satoshi Kojima (with Hiroyoshi Tenzan) defeated Rob Conway (c) (with Bruce Tharpe and Jax Dane)	Singles match for the NWA World Heavyweight Championship	08:27
5	Kazushi Sakuraba and Yuji Nagata defeated Daniel Gracie and Rolles Gracie by disqualification	Tag team match	09:50
6	The Great Muta and Toru Yano defeated Suzuki-gun (Minoru Suzuki and Shelton X Benjamin) (with Taichi and Taka Michinoku)	Tag team match	12:04
7	Togi Makabe defeated Bad Luck Fale	King of Destroyer match	15:05
8	Hirooki Goto defeated Katsuyori Shibata	Singles match	15:33
9	Kota Ibushi defeated Prince Devitt (c) (with Doc Gallows, Karl Anderson, Matt Jackson, Nick Jackson and Tama Tonga)	Singles match for the IWGP Junior Heavyweight Championship	16:22
10	Kazuchika Okada (c) (with Gedo) defeated Tetsuya Naito	Singles match for the IWGP Heavyweight Championship	30:58
11	Hiroshi Tanahashi defeated Shinsuke Nakamura (c)	Singles match for the IWGP Intercontinental Championship	23:24
(c) / – the champion(s) heading into the match; D / – this was a dark match
