= Wrestling Dontaku 2015 =

- Promotional poster for the event, featuring caricatures of several NJPW wrestlers
- Promotion: New Japan Pro-Wrestling
- Date: May 3, 2015
- City: Fukuoka, Japan
- Venue: Fukuoka Kokusai Center
- Attendance: 5,180

Pay-per-view chronology
← Previous; Invasion Attack	Next → Global Wars: Night #1

Wrestling Dontaku chronology
← Previous; 2014	Next → 2016

Wrestling Dontaku 2015 was a professional wrestling pay-per-view (PPV) event promoted by New Japan Pro-Wrestling (NJPW). The event took place on May 3, 2015, in Fukuoka, Fukuoka at Fukuoka Kokusai Center and featured nine matches, three of which were contested for championships.

In addition to streaming worldwide through NJPW World, the event also aired in Japan as a regular PPV through SKY PerfecTV!'s Sukachan service. It was the twelfth event under the Wrestling Dontaku name.

== Storylines ==
Wrestling Dontaku 2015 featured nine professional wrestling matches that involved different wrestlers from pre-existing scripted feuds and storylines. Wrestlers portrayed villains, heroes, or less distinguishable characters in the scripted events that built tension and culminated in a wrestling match or series of matches.

Wrestling Dontaku 2015 was main evented by Shinsuke Nakamura defending the IWGP Intercontinental Championship against Hirooki Goto. After failing to win the 2015 New Japan Cup and earn himself an IWGP Heavyweight Championship match, Goto announced he was changing his target to the IWGP Intercontinental Championship. Initially Nakamura did not take Goto's challenge seriously, but this changed on April 5 at Invasion Attack 2015, when he was pinned in a six-man tag team match by Goto, who then publicly challenged him to a title match, which was made official the next day. Goto is a former one-time IWGP Intercontinental Champion and lost the title to Nakamura in July 2012. Before the title match, Goto announced his goal was to first win the IWGP Intercontinental Championship and then unify it with the IWGP Heavyweight Championship.

Wrestling Dontaku 2015 also featured two more title matches, contested for NJPW's junior heavyweight titles. First, new champions Roppongi Vice (Beretta and Rocky Romero), who won the IWGP Junior Heavyweight Tag Team Championship at Invasion Attack 2015, were set to make their first title defense in a three-way match against previous champions The Young Bucks (Matt Jackson and Nick Jackson) and former one-time champions reDRagon (Bobby Fish and Kyle O'Reilly). Meanwhile, Kenny Omega was scheduled to defend the IWGP Junior Heavyweight Championship against Alex Shelley. This match was a result of events taking place at Invasion Attack 2015, where, after successfully defending his title against Máscara Dorada, Omega nominated Shelley as his next challenger.

The semi-main event of the show built up the July Dominion 7.5 in Osaka-jo Hall IWGP Heavyweight Championship main event between A.J. Styles and Kazuchika Okada with Styles teaming with his Bullet Club stablemate Yujiro Takahashi to face Okada and his Chaos stablemate Yoshi-Hashi in a tag team match. The previous year at Wrestling Dontaku 2014, Takahashi turned on Chaos and joined Bullet Club by costing Okada the IWGP Heavyweight Championship in a match against Styles. One of the matches at Wrestling Dontaku 2015 pitted three sets of rivals against each other in a six-man tag team match as Kazushi Sakuraba, Tomohiro Ishii and Toru Yano were set to take on Hiroshi Tanahashi, Katsuyori Shibata and Togi Makabe. Sakuraba and Shibata started their feud with each other after Invasion Attack 2015, where Sakuraba submitted his former protégé in a tag team match, Ishii and Makabe had feuded since the beginning of the year over the NEVER Openweight Championship, which Makabe won from Ishii on both January 4 and April 29, while Yano and Tanahashi had feuded since March's New Japan Cup with Yano scoring multiple upset wins over his rival. Another big match would see Bullet Club's Amber Gallows, Doc Gallows and Karl Anderson face The Kingdom's Maria Kanellis, Matt Taven and Michael Bennett in a six-person intergender tag team match. At Invasion Attack 2015, Taven and Bennett defeated Gallows and Anderson to capture the IWGP Tag Team Championship, largely thanks to a distraction from Bennett's wife Maria Kanellis. The next day, it was announced that Bullet Club would be bringing in Gallows' wife, wrestler Amber Gallows, to take on Taven, Bennett and Kanellis in a rare intergender match. This marked the first NJPW match involving female wrestlers since October 2002.

== Event ==
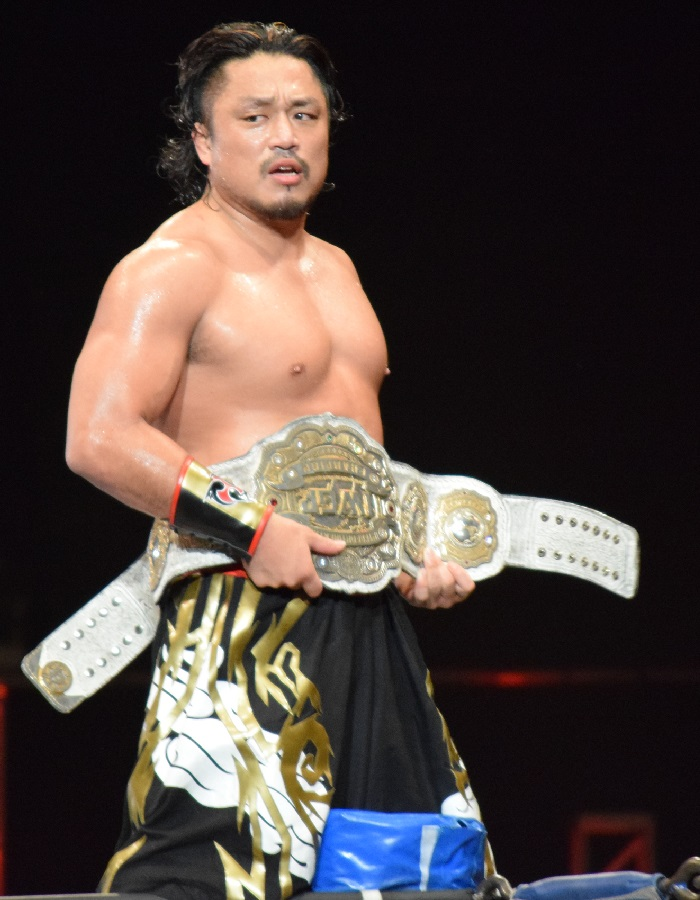
Hirooki Goto, holding the IWGP Intercontinental Championship belt he captured in the main event of Wrestling Dontaku 2015

The event started with a ten-bell salute to Ashura Hara. In the first title match of the event, The Young Bucks won the IWGP Junior Heavyweight Tag Team Championship for the third time by defeating Roppongi Vice and reDRagon in a three-way match, pinning Beretta to end his and Rocky Romero's title reign in their first defense. In the following match, Kenny Omega successfully defended the IWGP Junior Heavyweight Championship against Alex Shelley. The match featured outside interference from The Young Bucks, who pulled the referee out of the ring as Shelley was about to win and who were then attacked by his tag team partner Kushida. Following his win, Omega announced that he would not be taking part in the upcoming Best of the Super Juniors and would instead next defend his title against the winner of the tournament at Dominion 7.5 in Osaka-jo Hall. Next up was the six-person intergender tag team match between Bullet Club and The Kingdom. Throughout the match, NJPW continued a storyline, where Karl Anderson's infatuation with Maria Kanellis distracted him from the match. In the finish of the match, Anderson went to kiss Kanellis, but got hit with a low blow instead by Kanellis, who then pinned Amber Gallows for the win. After the match, Anderson turned on Kanellis, throwing her into a punch from Doc Gallows, which was followed by the two performing their signature double-team move, Magic Killer, on her, before being chased away from the ring by Bennett and Taven.

The seventh match of the event saw Hiroshi Tanahashi, Katsuyori Shibata and Togi Makabe defeat Kazushi Sakuraba, Tomohiro Ishii and Toru Yano. In the finish of the match, Tanahashi used Yano's own tactics against him by grabbing him by his hair and then pinning him to finally pick up a win over his rival. The semi-main event saw Bullet Club's A.J. Styles and Yujiro Takahashi defeat Chaos' Kazuchika Okada and Yoshi-Hashi with Styles pinning Yoshi-Hashi for the win. After the match, Styles and Okada both tried to hit their respective finishing moves, Styles Clash and Rainmaker, on each other, but both managed to avoid them. Okada then posed with Styles' IWGP Heavyweight Championship belt, before handing it back to him. In the main event of the show, Hirooki Goto defeated Shinsuke Nakamura to win the IWGP Intercontinental Championship for the second time. Following the win, Goto reiterated that his goal was to unify the Intercontinental and Heavyweight Championships.

== Results ==
No.	Results	Stipulations	Times
1	Jyushin Thunder Liger, Máscara Dorada, Tiger Mask and Yuji Nagata defeated Captain New Japan, Kushida, Manabu Nakanishi and Ryusuke Taguchi	Eight-man tag team match	08:29
2	Kota Ibushi and Yohei Komatsu defeated Sho Tanaka and Tetsuya Naito	Tag team match	11:55
3	Hiroyoshi Tenzan, Satoshi Kojima and Tomoaki Honma defeated Bullet Club (Bad Luck Fale, Cody Hall and Tama Tonga)	Six-man tag team match	08:57
4	The Young Bucks (Matt Jackson and Nick Jackson) defeated Roppongi Vice (Beretta and Rocky Romero) (c) and reDRagon (Bobby Fish and Kyle O'Reilly)	Three-way tag team match for the IWGP Junior Heavyweight Tag Team Championship	17:17
5	Kenny Omega (c) (with Matt Jackson and Nick Jackson) defeated Alex Shelley (with Kushida and Ryusuke Taguchi)	Singles match for the IWGP Junior Heavyweight Championship	16:07
6	The Kingdom (Maria Kanellis, Matt Taven and Michael Bennett) defeated Bullet Club (Amber Gallows, Doc Gallows and Karl Anderson)	Six-person intergender tag team match	08:09
7	Hiroshi Tanahashi, Katsuyori Shibata and Togi Makabe defeated Kazushi Sakuraba, Tomohiro Ishii and Toru Yano	Six-man tag team match	15:52
8	Bullet Club (AJ Styles and Yujiro Takahashi) defeated Chaos (Kazuchika Okada and Yoshi-Hashi) (with Gedo)	Tag team match	13:20
9	Hirooki Goto defeated Shinsuke Nakamura (c)	Singles match for the IWGP Intercontinental Championship	20:53
(c) / – the champion(s) heading into the match
