= Sakura Genesis (2024) =

2024 New Japan Pro-Wrestling event

- Full-section promotional poster of the event
- Promotion: New Japan Pro-Wrestling
- Date: April 6, 2024
- City: Tokyo, Japan
- Venue: Ryōgoku Kokugikan
- Attendance: 6,632

Event chronology
← Previous; The New Beginning in Sapporo	Next → Windy City Riot

Sakura Genesis chronology
← Previous; 2023	Next → 2025

Sakura Genesis was professional wrestling event promoted by New Japan Pro-Wrestling (NJPW). The event took place on April 6, 2024, in Tokyo at Ryōgoku Kokugikan. Previously held under the Invasion Attack name, this was the fifth event to be held under the Sakura Genesis name.

== Production ==
=== Storylines ===
Sakura Genesis will feature professional wrestling matches that involve different wrestlers from pre-existing scripted feuds and storylines. Wrestlers portray villains, heroes, or less distinguishable characters in the scripted events that build tension and culminate in a wrestling match or series of matches.

On March 20, 2024, Yota Tsuji would win the New Japan Cup by defeating three-time winner Hirooki Goto in the finals, allowing Tsuji to challenge Tetsuya Naito for the IWGP World Heavyweight Championship at Sakura Genesis.

== Results ==
No.	Results	Stipulations	Times
1^{P}	Chaos (Tomohiro Ishii and Toru Yano) and Oleg Boltin defeated Ayato Yoshida, Takuro Niki and Chicharito Shoki by pinfall	Six-man tag team match	8:33
2	TMDK (Zack Sabre Jr. and Kosei Fujita) defeated El Desperado and Ryusuke Taguchi by pinfall	Tag team match	9:33
3	Los Ingobernables de Japon (Hiromu Takahashi and Bushi) defeated Bullet Club War Dogs (David Finlay and Gedo) by submission	Tag team match	5:39
4	Just 5 Guys (Sanada, Douki and Yuya Uemura) defeated United Empire (Great-O-Khan, Jeff Cobb and Callum Newman) by pinfall	Six-man tag team match	8:53
5	Bullet Club War Dogs (Drilla Moloney and Clark Connors) (c) defeated Intergalactic Jet Setters (Kushida and Kevin Knight) and Catch 2/2 (TJP and Francesco Akira) by pinfall	Three-way tornado tag team match for the IWGP Junior Heavyweight Tag Team Championship	17:57
6	Bishamon (Hirooki Goto and Yoshi-Hashi) defeated Bullet Club (Kenta and Chase Owens) (c) by pinfall	Tag team match for the IWGP Tag Team Championship	13:57
7	Sho (c) defeated Yoh by referee stoppage	Singles match for the IWGP Junior Heavyweight Championship	1:50
8	Shota Umino and Jon Moxley defeated House of Torture (Ren Narita and Jack Perry) by pinfall	Tag team match	14:35
9	Shingo Takagi defeated Evil (c) (with Yoshinobu Kanemaru) by pinfall	Singles match for the NEVER Openweight Championship	21:17
10	Tetsuya Naito (c) defeated Yota Tsuji by pinfall	Singles match for the IWGP World Heavyweight Championship	34:25
(c) / – the champion(s) heading into the match; P / – the match was broadcast on the pre-show

== See also ==
- 2024 in professional wrestling
- List of major NJPW events
