= Sakura Genesis (2026) =

2026 New Japan Pro-Wrestling event

- Promotional poster of the event
- Promotion: New Japan Pro-Wrestling
- Date: April 4, 2026
- City: Tokyo, Japan
- Venue: Ryōgoku Kokugikan
- Attendance: 6,009

Event chronology
← Previous; NJPW 54th Anniversary Show	Next → Fantastica Mania USA

Sakura Genesis chronology
← Previous; 2025	Next → —

Sakura Genesis was a professional wrestling event promoted by New Japan Pro-Wrestling (NJPW). The event took place on April 4, 2026, in Tokyo at Ryōgoku Kokugikan. Previously held under the Invasion Attack name, this was the seventh event to be held under the Sakura Genesis name.

== Production ==
=== Storylines ===
Sakura Genesis featured professional wrestling matches that involve different wrestlers from pre-existing scripted feuds and storylines. Wrestlers portray villains, heroes, or less distinguishable characters in the scripted events that build tension and culminate in a wrestling match or series of matches.

=== Event ===
The event started with the tag team confrontation between Tatsuya Matsumoto and Taisei Nakahara, and Kushida and Masatora Yasuda, scored with the victory of the latter.

Next up, Hartley Jackson and Kosei Fujita picked up a victory over Togi Makabe and Master Wato in tag team competition.

The third bout saw Shingo Takagi Taiji Ishimori, and Robbie X outmatch Jake Lee, Francesco Akira, and Jakob Austin Young in six-man tag team competition.

Next up, Aaron Wolf, Tiger Mask, Toru Yano, and Yoh defeated Don Fale, Douki, Sho, and Yoshinobu Kanemaru in eight-man tag team competition.

In the sixth bout, Boltin Oleg, Hirooki Goto and Yoshi-Hashi defeated Ren Narita, Yujiro Takahashi, and Chase Owens to secure the second consecutive defense of the NEVER Openweight 6-Man Tag Team Championship in that respective reign.

Next up, Konosuke Takeshita wrestled Shota Umino into a time-limit draw in a bout disputed for the NJPW World Television Championship, rendering Takeshita as retaining the title for the second time successfully in that respective reign. After the bout concluded, the latter was attacked by Chase Owens who declared a challenge for the title.

In the semi-main event, Oskar and Yuto-Ice defeated Zack Sabre Jr. and Ryohei Oiwa to secure the fifth consecutive defense of the IWGP Tag Team Championship in that respective reign. After the bout concluded, Great-O-Khan and Henare stepped up to challenge Ice and Oskar, only for the champion team to furtherly nominate former multi-time champions Hirooki Goto and Yoshi-Hashi. A number one contender's match between the two teams was scheduled to take part on further notice.

In the main event, 2026 New Japan Cup winner Callum Newman defeated Yota Tsuji to win the IWGP Heavyweight Championship, ending the latter's reign at 90 days and one defense. Over this, Newman became the youngest IWGP Heavyweight Champion at 23 years, 7 months and 4 days, beating the previous record held by Shinsuke Nakamura at the time of his win. After the bout concluded, Tsuji, who was also the IWGP Global Heavyweight Champion, was attacked by a masked figure who was instantly revealed to be Gabe Kidd, thus cementing the latter's challenge for Tsuji's title. Newman was challenged by Shingo Takagi who unsuccessfully tried to help Unbound Co. stablemate Tsuji to fight Kidd off.

== Results ==
No.	Results	Stipulations	Times
1^{P}	Kushida and Masatora Yasuda defeated Tatsuya Matsumoto and Taisei Nakahara by submission	Tag team match	8:05
2	TMDK (Hartley Jackson and Kosei Fujita) defeated Togi Makabe and Master Wato by pinfall	Tag team match	7:02
3	Unbound Co. (Shingo Takagi, Taiji Ishimori, and Robbie X) (with Daiki Nagai) defeated United Empire (Jake Lee, Francesco Akira, and Jakob Austin Young) by pinfall	Six-man tag team match	8:17
4	Aaron Wolf, Tiger Mask, Toru Yano, and Yoh defeated House of Torture (Don Fale, Douki, Sho, and Yoshinobu Kanemaru) by submission	Eight-man tag team match	7:23
5	United Empire (Will Ospreay, Great-O-Khan, and Henare) defeated Yuya Uemura, Taichi, and El Desperado by pinfall	Six-man tag team match	14:54
6	Bishamon-tin (Boltin Oleg, Hirooki Goto and Yoshi-Hashi) (c) defeated House of Torture (Ren Narita, Yujiro Takahashi, and Chase Owens) (with Dick Togo) by pinfall	Six-man tag team match for the NEVER Openweight 6-Man Tag Team Championship	12:44
7	Konosuke Takeshita (c) vs. Shota Umino ended in a time limit draw	Singles match for the NJPW World Television Championship	15:00
8	Knock Out Brothers (Oskar and Yuto-Ice) (c) defeated TMDK (Zack Sabre Jr. and Ryohei Oiwa) by pinfall	Tag team match for the IWGP Tag Team Championship	22:31
9	Callum Newman (with Will Ospreay, Great-O-Khan, Henare, Jake Lee, Francesco Akira, Jakob Austin Young, and Zane Jay) defeated Yota Tsuji (c) (with Daiki Nagai) by pinfall	Singles match for the IWGP Heavyweight Championship	24:18
(c) / – the champion(s) heading into the match; P / – the match was broadcast on the pre-show

== See also ==
- 2026 in professional wrestling
- List of major NJPW events
