= Sakura Genesis (2023) =

2023 New Japan Pro-Wrestling event

- Promotional poster of the event
- Promotion: New Japan Pro-Wrestling
- Date: April 8, 2023
- City: Tokyo, Japan
- Venue: Ryōgoku Kokugikan
- Attendance: 6,510

Event chronology
← Previous; Multiverse United	Next → Capital Collision

Sakura Genesis chronology
← Previous; 2021	Next → 2024

Sakura Genesis was a professional wrestling event promoted by New Japan Pro-Wrestling (NJPW). The event took on April 8, 2023, in Tokyo at Ryōgoku Kokugikan. Previously held under the Invasion Attack name, this was the fourth event to be held under the Sakura Genesis name.

The main event saw the 2023 New Japan Cup winner Sanada defeat Kazuchika Okada to win the IWGP World Heavyweight Championship.

== Production ==
=== Storylines ===
Sakura Genesis featured professional wrestling matches that involve different wrestlers from pre-existing scripted feuds and storylines. Wrestlers portray villains, heroes, or less distinguishable characters in the scripted events that build tension and culminate in a wrestling match or series of matches.

On January 8, 2023, NJPW announced the New Japan Cup dates with the participants being announced on February 13. Sanada won the tournament by defeating David Finlay in the finals, receiving an IWGP World Heavyweight Championship match at Sakura Genesis.

At the New Japan Cup finals, Hiromu Takahashi successfully defended the IWGP Junior Heavyweight Championship against Lio Rush. After the match, Zack Sabre Jr. came out to ringside and introduced the newest member of TMDK who was revealed to be Robbie Eagles, Eagles issued a title challenge for Sakura Genesis which Takahashi accepted.

== Results ==
No.	Results	Stipulations	Times
1	Minoru Suzuki, Toru Yano and Great-O-Khan defeated Hiroshi Tanahashi, El Desperado and Yoh by pinfall	Six-man tag team match	13:10
2	United Empire (Jeff Cobb, Aaron Henare and Francesco Akira) defeated House of Torture (Evil, Yujiro Takahashi and Sho) by pinfall	Six-man tag team match	8:01
3	Just 5 Guys (Taichi, Yoshinobu Kanemaru and Douki) (with Taka Michinoku) defeated Los Ingobernables de Japon (Tetsuya Naito, Shingo Takagi and Bushi) by submission	Six-man tag team match	9:20
4	Bullet Club (David Finlay, El Phantasmo and Kenta) (with Gedo) defeated Guerrillas of Destiny (Tama Tonga and Hikuleo) and Master Wato by pinfall	Six-man tag team match	8:46
5	Mercedes Moné (c) defeated AZM and Hazuki by pinfall	Three-way match for the IWGP Women's Championship	13:53
6	Zack Sabre Jr. (c) (with Kosei Fujita) defeated Shota Umino by pinfall	Singles match for the NJPW World Television Championship	13:35
7	Aussie Open (Mark Davis and Kyle Fletcher) defeated Bishamon (Hirooki Goto and Yoshi-Hashi) (c) by pinfall	Tag team match for the IWGP Tag Team Championship	15:30
8	Hiromu Takahashi (c) defeated Robbie Eagles (with Kosei Fujita) by pinfall	Singles match for the IWGP Junior Heavyweight Championship	21:12
9	Sanada (with Just 5 Guys (Taichi, Yoshinobu Kanemaru, Taka Michinoku and Douki)) defeated Kazuchika Okada (c) by pinfall	Singles match for the IWGP World Heavyweight Championship	26:58
(c) / – the champion(s) heading into the match

== See also ==
- 2023 in professional wrestling
- List of major NJPW events
