= Wrestling Dontaku 2014 =

- Promotional poster for the event, featuring caricatures of several NJPW wrestlers
- Promotion: New Japan Pro-Wrestling
- Date: May 3, 2014
- City: Fukuoka, Japan
- Venue: Fukuoka Kokusai Center
- Attendance: 7,190

Pay-per-view chronology
← Previous; Invasion Attack	Next → Global Wars

Wrestling Dontaku chronology
← Previous; 2013	Next → 2015

New Japan Pro-Wrestling events chronology
← Previous; Invasion Attack	Next → Global Wars

Wrestling Dontaku 2014 was a professional wrestling pay-per-view (PPV) event promoted by New Japan Pro-Wrestling (NJPW). The event took place on May 3, 2014, in Fukuoka, Fukuoka, at the Fukuoka Kokusai Center. The event featured ten matches (including one dark match), five of which were contested for championships. It was the eleventh event under the Wrestling Dontaku name.

== Storylines ==
Wrestling Dontaku 2014 featured ten professional wrestling matches that involved different wrestlers from pre-existing scripted feuds and storylines. Wrestlers portrayed villains, heroes, or less distinguishable characters in the scripted events that built tension and culminated in a wrestling match or series of matches.

== Event ==
In the first title match of the event, The Young Bucks (Matt Jackson and Nick Jackson) successfully defended the IWGP Junior Heavyweight Tag Team Championship against former two-time champions, Forever Hooligans (Alex Koslov and Rocky Romero), who had earned their title shot during NJPW's April trip to Taiwan. The second title match featured the NJPW debut of National Wrestling Alliance (NWA) representative Wes Brisco, who unsuccessfully challenged Satoshi Kojima for the NWA World Heavyweight Championship, which his uncle Jack has held in the past. The third title match saw Ryusuke Taguchi return to the IWGP Junior Heavyweight Championship picture by challenging Kota Ibushi. Taguchi, coming off a big grudge match win over Prince Devitt at Invasion Attack 2014, had challenged Ibushi for the title twice before, but was defeated both times. The match at Wrestling Dontaku 2014 ended with the same result with Ibushi making his third successful title defense. The fourth title match featured Tomohiro Ishii also making his third successful defense of the NEVER Openweight Championship against Tomoaki Honma, avenging a six-man tag team loss from April 19 in the process. Post-match, Ishii was challenged by Ibushi.

One of the big matches of the event saw the Bullet Club stable, which was celebrating its one-year anniversary, take on representatives of NJPW in a four-on-four elimination tag team match. Hiroshi Tanahashi and Togi Makabe survived the match, winning it for NJPW, and afterwards challenged Bullet Club's IWGP Tag Team Champions, Doc Gallows and Karl Anderson, to a title match, but were interrupted by Hirooki Goto and Katsuyori Shibata, who were also eyeing a shot at the title. Another match featured IWGP Intercontinental Champion Shinsuke Nakamura teaming up with Kazushi Sakuraba to take on Daniel and Rolles Gracie. After regaining his title at Invasion Attack 2014, Nakamura was challenged by the Gracies, leading to Sakuraba offering to form a tag team with him. In the build-up to the match, NJPW noted that Daniel holds a mixed martial arts win over Nakamura from December 2002. The Gracies won the match, after which Daniel challenged Nakamura to a title match. The main event featured Kazuchika Okada defending the IWGP Heavyweight Championship against A.J. Styles, who debuted at Invasion Attack 2014 by attacking Okada and revealing himself as the newest member of Bullet Club. At the end of the match, Yujiro Takahashi, who had recently started a storyline, where he began showing disgruntlement towards his current position in NJPW and started walking out on his tag team matches alongside his Chaos stablemates, turned on Okada and the stable and helped Styles win the match and become the 60th IWGP Heavyweight Champion. With the win, Styles became the sixth foreigner to win NJPW's top title.

== Results ==
No.	Results	Stipulations	Times
1^{D}	Bushi, Captain New Japan, El Desperado and Máscara Dorada defeated Hiroyoshi Tenzan, Kushida, Tiger Mask and Yohei Komatsu	Eight-man tag team match	09:16
2	The Young Bucks (Matt Jackson and Nick Jackson) (c) defeated Forever Hooligans (Alex Koslov and Rocky Romero)	Tag team match for the IWGP Junior Heavyweight Tag Team Championship	15:09
3	Crazy Ichizoku (Takashi Iizuka and Toru Yano) defeated Suzuki-gun (Minoru Suzuki and Shelton X Benjamin) (with Taichi and Taka Michinoku) by disqualification	Tag team match	09:02
4	Satoshi Kojima (c) (with Hiroyoshi Tenzan) defeated Wes Brisco (with Bruce Tharpe)	Singles match for the NWA World Heavyweight Championship	09:25
5	Meiyu Tag (Hirooki Goto and Katsuyori Shibata) defeated Manabu Nakanishi and Yuji Nagata	Tag team match	10:50
6	Kota Ibushi (c) defeated Ryusuke Taguchi	Singles match for the IWGP Junior Heavyweight Championship	14:03
7	Tomohiro Ishii (c) defeated Tomoaki Honma	Singles match for the NEVER Openweight Championship	14:07
8	Jyushin Thunder Liger, Hiroshi Tanahashi, Tetsuya Naito and Togi Makabe defeated Bullet Club (Bad Luck Fale, Doc Gallows, Karl Anderson and Tama Tonga)	Eight-man elimination tag team match	15:36
9	Gracie Ichizoku (Daniel Gracie and Rolles Gracie) defeated Kazushi Sakuraba and Shinsuke Nakamura	Ishu kakutōgi sen rules tag team match	08:30
10	A.J. Styles (with Karl Anderson, Matt Jackson and Nick Jackson) defeated Kazuchika Okada (c) (with Gedo)	Singles match for the IWGP Heavyweight Championship	24:31
(c) / – the champion(s) heading into the match; D / – this was a dark match
