= Sakura Genesis 2018 =

2018 New Japan Pro-Wrestling event

- Promotion: New Japan Pro-Wrestling
- Date: April 1, 2018
- City: Tokyo, Japan
- Venue: Ryōgoku Kokugikan
- Attendance: 9,882

Event chronology
← Previous; Strong Style Evolved	Next → Lions Gate Project 11

Sakura Genesis chronology
← Previous; 2017	Next → 2021

Sakura Genesis 2018 was a professional wrestling event promoted by New Japan Pro-Wrestling (NJPW), which took place on April 1, 2018, in Tokyo at Ryōgoku Kokugikan. The main event featured the 2018 New Japan Cup winner Zack Sabre Jr. challenging Kazuchika Okada for the IWGP Heavyweight Championship. It was the second event under the Sakura Genesis name.

== Storylines ==
Other on-screen personnel
Role:	Name:
Commentators	Don Callis (English-language announcer)
Commentators	Kevin Kelly (English-language announcer)
Ring announcers	Makoto Abe
Referees	Kenta Sato
Referees	Marty Asami
Referees	Red Shoes Unno
Referees	Tiger Hattori

Sakura Genesis 2018 will feature professional wrestling matches that involved different wrestlers from pre-existing scripted feuds and storylines. Wrestlers portrayed villains, heroes, or less distinguishable characters in the scripted events that built tension and culminated in a wrestling match or series of matches.

On March 21, 2018, Zack Sabre Jr. won the New Japan Cup after defeating Hiroshi Tanahashi in the final. Sabre Jr. had previously beaten Tetsuya Naito in the first round on March 11, Kota Ibushi in the second round on March 15, and Sanada in the semifinals on March 18. Since the winner of the New Japan Cup gets to challenge for the NEVER Openweight Championship, IWGP Intercontinental Championship, or IWGP Heavyweight Championship, Sabre Jr. decided to challenge Kazuchika Okada for the Heavyweight Title after his finals match. The match is set to happen on Sakura Genesis.

On the second night of The New Beginning in Sapporo, Roppongi 3K (Sho and Yoh) won the IWGP Junior Heavyweight Tag Team Championship. They would lose the titles to Suzuki-gun (El Desperado and Yoshinobu Kanemaru) on the NJPW 46th Anniversary Show in a triple threat involving Los Ingobernables de Japón (Bushi and Hiromu Takahashi). Bushi and Takahashi would be in matches against Suzuki-gun multiple times after the Anniversary Show, much to Roppongi 3K's chagrin. This would lead to post-match attacks by Bushi and Takahashi on Desperado and Kanemaru, leading to Roppongi 3K coming to stop the fighting and asserting their spot as the next challengers for the championship. On March 23, NJPW made the triple threat rematch official.

== Results ==
No.	Results	Stipulations	Times
1	The Young Bucks (Matt Jackson and Nick Jackson) defeated Bullet Club (Chase Owens and Yujiro Takahashi)	Tag team match	9:23
2	Chaos (Tomohiro Ishii and Toru Yano) defeated Suzuki-gun (Taichi and Takashi Iizuka)	Tag team match	7:42
3	Bullet Club (Bad Luck Fale, Tama Tonga and Tanga Loa) (c) defeated Michael Elgin, Ryusuke Taguchi and Togi Makabe	Six-man tag team match for the NEVER Openweight 6-Man Tag Team Championship	11:20
4	Taguchi Japan (Hiroshi Tanahashi, Juice Robinson and David Finlay) defeated Chaos (Hirooki Goto, Jay White and Yoshi-Hashi)	Six-man tag team match	9:18
5	Suzuki-gun (Minoru Suzuki, Davey Boy Smith Jr. and Lance Archer) defeated Los Ingobernables de Japón (Tetsuya Naito, Evil and Sanada)	Six-man tag team match	11:24
6	Suzuki-gun (El Desperado and Yoshinobu Kanemaru) (c) defeated Los Ingobernables de Japón (Bushi and Hiromu Takahashi) and Roppongi 3K (Sho and Yoh)	Three-way tag team match for the IWGP Junior Heavyweight Tag Team Championship	12:45
7	Will Ospreay (c) defeated Marty Scurll	Singles match for the IWGP Junior Heavyweight Championship	30:44
8	Bullet Club (Cody and Hangman Page) defeated Golden☆Lovers (Kenny Omega and Kota Ibushi)	Tag team match	23:52
9	Kazuchika Okada (c) (with Gedo) defeated Zack Sabre Jr. (with Taka Michinoku)	Singles match for the IWGP Heavyweight Championship	34:58
(c) / – the champion(s) heading into the match
