= New Japan Pro-Wrestling World =

- Broadcast area: Worldwide
- Headquarters: Roppongi, Minato, Tokyo, Japan

Programming
- Languages: Japanese; English; French
- Picture format: 720p HD

Ownership
- Owner: New Japan Pro-Wrestling; TV Asahi

History
- Launched: December 1, 2014

Links
- Website: njpwworld.com

New Japan Pro-Wrestling World (新日本プロレスワールド, Shin Nihon Puroresu Wārudo), also referred to as NJPW World and New Japan World, is a subscription-based video streaming service owned by the Japanese professional wrestling promotion New Japan Pro-Wrestling (NJPW). On December 1, 2014, NJPW and its minority owner TV Asahi announced it as a new worldwide streaming site for the promotion's events. All major NJPW events air live on the service, which also features matches from the promotion's archives, dating back to 1972.

In 2015, King of Pro-Wrestling marked the first ever event on NJPW World to feature English commentary. As part of a working relationship between NJPW and the Mexican Consejo Mundial de Lucha Libre (CMLL) promotion, NJPW began airing CMLL's Viernes Espectaculares show on NJPW World, starting July 9, 2016. On April 8, 2022, it was announced that as part of a working relationship between NJPW and the American All Elite Wrestling (AEW) promotion, NJPW began airing AEW's Dynamite and Rampage weekly shows on NJPW World.

Since inception, the service has had a monthly subscription price of ¥999 (US$9.1). As of May 2017, subscription numbers were roughly 50,000 subscribers with 10,000 outside Japan. By July 2018, the subscription's numbers had risen to 100,000 in total, with 40,000 outside of Japan.

== See also ==
- All Japan Pro Wrestling TV
- Honor Club
- TNA+
- UFC Fight Pass
- Wrestle Universe
- WWE Network
- WWNLive
