= The New Beginning in Hiroshima (2014) =

Professional wrestling event in Hiroshima, Japan

- Promotional poster for the event, featuring Hiroshi Tanahashi and Shinsuke Nakamura
- Promotion: New Japan Pro-Wrestling
- Date: February 9, 2014
- City: Hiroshima, Japan
- Venue: Hiroshima Sun Plaza Hall
- Attendance: 5,040

Pay-per-view chronology
← Previous; Wrestle Kingdom 8 in Tokyo Dome	Next → The New Beginning in Osaka

The New Beginning chronology
← Previous; 2013	Next → Osaka 2014

The New Beginning in Hiroshima was a professional wrestling pay-per-view (PPV) event promoted by New Japan Pro-Wrestling (NJPW). The event took place on February 9, 2014, in Hiroshima, Hiroshima at the Hiroshima Sun Plaza Hall. The event featured ten matches, three of which were contested for championships. It was the fifth event under the New Beginning name.

== Storylines ==
The New Beginning in Hiroshima featured ten professional wrestling matches that involved different wrestlers from pre-existing scripted feuds and storylines. Wrestlers portrayed villains, heroes, or less distinguishable characters in the scripted events that built tension and culminated in a wrestling match or series of matches.

== Event ==
Several matches during the event built to matches taking place at The New Beginning in Osaka two days later. The event also featured the NJPW debuts of National Wrestling Alliance (NWA) representatives Michael Tarver and Big Daddy Yum-Yum, who unsuccessfully challenged Satoshi Kojima for the NWA World Heavyweight Championship in the first title match of the event. The two other title matches were rematches from January 4's Wrestle Kingdom 8 in Tokyo Dome event; in the first Doc Gallows and Karl Anderson made their first successful defense of the IWGP Tag Team Championship against K.E.S. (Davey Boy Smith Jr. and Lance Archer) and in the main event Hiroshi Tanahashi made his first successful defense of the IWGP Intercontinental Championship against Shinsuke Nakamura.

== Results ==
No.	Results	Stipulations	Times
1	El Desperado and Jyushin Thunder Liger defeated Bushi and Kota Ibushi	Tag team match	08:46
2	Minoru Suzuki (with Taichi) defeated Tama Tonga	Singles match	05:32
3	Crazy Ichizoku (Takashi Iizuka and Toru Yano) defeated Kazushi Sakuraba and Yuji Nagata by disqualification	Tag team match	09:16
4	Michael Tarver defeated Hiroyoshi Tenzan	Singles match	09:15
5	Satoshi Kojima (c) defeated Big Daddy Yum-Yum (with Bruce Tharpe)	Singles match for the NWA World Heavyweight Championship	11:04
6	Chaos (Tomohiro Ishii and Yujiro Takahashi) defeated Tetsuya Naito and Tomoaki Honma	Tag team match	11:27
7	Bullet Club (Bad Luck Fale, Matt Jackson, Nick Jackson and Prince Devitt) defeated Ryusuke Taguchi, Time Splitters (Alex Shelley and Kushida) and Togi Makabe	Eight-man tag team match	11:28
8	Hirooki Goto and Katsuyori Shibata defeated Chaos (Kazuchika Okada and Yoshi-Hashi)	Tag team match	14:38
9	Bullet Club (Doc Gallows and Karl Anderson) (c) (with Tama Tonga) defeated K.E.S. (Davey Boy Smith Jr. and Lance Archer) (with Taka Michinoku)	Tag team match for the IWGP Tag Team Championship	12:08
10	Hiroshi Tanahashi (c) defeated Shinsuke Nakamura	Singles match for the IWGP Intercontinental Championship	22:32
(c) / – the champion(s) heading into the match
