= The New Beginning in Osaka (2014) =

Professional wrestling event in Osaka, Japan

- Promotional poster for the event, featuring Kazuchika Okada and Hirooki Goto
- Promotion: New Japan Pro-Wrestling
- Date: February 11, 2014
- City: Osaka, Japan
- Venue: Osaka Prefectural Gymnasium
- Attendance: 6,400

Pay-per-view chronology
← Previous; The New Beginning in Hiroshima	Next → Hataage Kinenbi

The New Beginning chronology
← Previous; Hiroshima	Next → Osaka 2015

New Japan Pro-Wrestling events chronology
← Previous; The New Beginning in Hiroshima	Next → Invasion Attack

The New Beginning in Osaka (2014) was a professional wrestling pay-per-view (PPV) event promoted by New Japan Pro-Wrestling (NJPW). The event took place on February 11, 2014, in Osaka, Osaka at the Osaka Prefectural Gymnasium. The event featured ten matches, four of which were contested for championships. It was the sixth event under the New Beginning name.

== Storylines ==
The New Beginning in Osaka featured ten professional wrestling matches that involved different wrestlers from pre-existing scripted feuds and storylines. Wrestlers portrayed villains, heroes, or less distinguishable characters in the scripted events that built tension and culminated in a wrestling match or series of matches.

== Event ==
In the opening match, The Young Bucks (Matt Jackson and Nick Jackson) made their second successful defense of the IWGP Junior Heavyweight Tag Team Championship against former champions, the Time Splitters (Alex Shelley and Kushida). In the fourth match, Ryusuke Taguchi picked up his first win since returning from an eight-month injury break at the beginning of the month by pinning former Apollo 55 partner and Bullet Club leader Prince Devitt in a tag team match. The working relationship between NJPW and the National Wrestling Alliance (NWA) continued in the fifth match, where Tencozy (Hiroyoshi Tenzan and Satoshi Kojima) defeated Big Daddy Yum-Yum and Michael Tarver, with Tenzan submitting Tarver to avenge a loss suffered two days earlier. As a result, Tencozy earned another shot at the NWA World Tag Team Championship, held by The IronGodz (Jax Dane and Rob Conway). The sixth match of the event featured the returns of mixed martial artists Daniel and Rolles Gracie to take on Kazushi Sakuraba and Yuji Nagata in a rematch from Wrestle Kingdom 8 in Tokyo Dome after the original match ended in a disqualification. After the Gracies had won, Takashi Iizuka and Toru Yano came out to challenge them.

In the second title match of the event, Kota Ibushi made his first successful defense of the IWGP Junior Heavyweight Championship against El Desperado, who had made his debut appearance at Wrestle Kingdom 8 in Tokyo Dome. Following the match, Nick Jackson challenged Ibushi to a title match. The ninth match saw Tomohiro Ishii win his first title in NJPW, eight years after starting to work regularly for the promotion, as he defeated Tetsuya Naito to become the third NEVER Openweight Champion. Finally, in the main event of the evening, Kazuchika Okada made his eighth successful defense of the IWGP Heavyweight Championship against Hirooki Goto. Post-match, Goto's tag team partner Katsuyori Shibata expressed interest in challenging Okada, but Okada instead told him to first win the New Japan Cup.

== Results ==
No.	Results	Stipulations	Times
1	The Young Bucks (Matt Jackson and Nick Jackson) (c) defeated Time Splitters (Alex Shelley and Kushida)	Tag team match for the IWGP Junior Heavyweight Tag Team Championship	13:05
2	Katsuyori Shibata defeated Yoshi-Hashi	Singles match	05:21
3	Suzuki-gun (Davey Boy Smith Jr., Lance Archer and Minoru Suzuki) (with Taichi and Taka Michinoku) defeated Bullet Club (Doc Gallows, Karl Anderson and Tama Tonga)	Six-man tag team match	07:53
4	Ryusuke Taguchi and Togi Makabe defeated Bullet Club (Bad Luck Fale and Prince Devitt)	Tag team match	09:53
5	Tencozy (Hiroyoshi Tenzan and Satoshi Kojima) defeated Big Daddy Yum-Yum and Michael Tarver (with Bruce Tharpe)	Tag team match for the #1 contendership to the NWA World Tag Team Championship	12:54
6	Gracie Ichizoku (Daniel Gracie and Rolles Gracie) defeated Kazushi Sakuraba and Yuji Nagata	Ishu kakutōgi sen rules tag team match	09:28
7	Hiroshi Tanahashi and Jyushin Thunder Liger defeated Chaos (Shinsuke Nakamura and Yujiro Takahashi)	Tag team match	12:43
8	Kota Ibushi (c) defeated El Desperado	Singles match for the IWGP Junior Heavyweight Championship	13:34
9	Tomohiro Ishii defeated Tetsuya Naito (c)	Singles match for the NEVER Openweight Championship	23:41
10	Kazuchika Okada (c) (with Gedo) defeated Hirooki Goto (with Katsuyori Shibata)	Singles match for the IWGP Heavyweight Championship	22:51
(c) / – the champion(s) heading into the match
