= Michael Tarver =

American wrestler (born 1977)

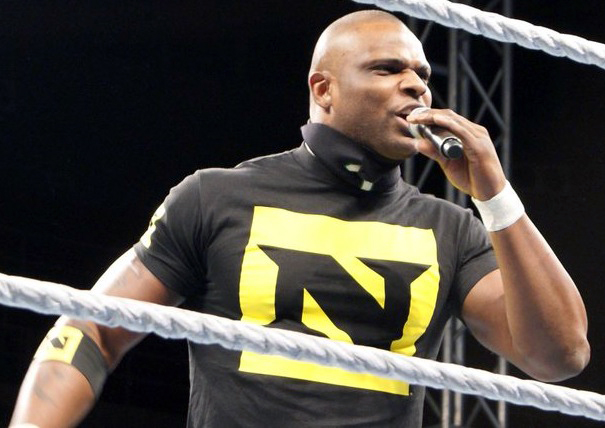
- Tarver in 2010

Personal information
- Born: Tyrone Evans; March 8, 1977 (age 49) Akron, Ohio, U.S.

Professional wrestling career
- Ring name(s): Michael Tarver; Mike Tarver; Monster Tarver; Mr. Tarver; Tyrone Evans; Tyrone Jones; Tyson Tarver; Tarver
- Billed height: 6 ft 2 in (1.88 m)
- Billed weight: 256 lb (116 kg)
- Billed from: Akron, Ohio
- Trained by: FCW
- Debut: 2005
- Retired: 2026

Tyrone Evans (born March 8, 1977) is an American retired professional wrestler and rapper known as Michael Tarver. He is best known for his time with WWE where he appeared on the first season of WWE NXT and later debuted as a member of the faction The Nexus. After he left WWE in 2011, he wrestled for the National Wrestling Alliance and made a few appearances for New Japan Pro-Wrestling and Chikara.

== Professional wrestling career ==
=== Early career (2005–2008) ===
Evans defeated Brandon X in a match at an NWA East / Pro Wrestling eXpress event on February 19, 2005. Evans defeated Daron Smythe for the Pro Wrestling Express (PWX) Brass Knuckles Championship on April 2, 2005. On June 11, Venom defeated Evans for the Brass Knuckles Championship. After the title loss, Evans challenged Brandon K for the territory's Heavyweight Championship on September 8, 2006, and was unsuccessful. Later that year, he wrestled for Coldwater Michigan-based promotion Price of Glory Wrestling, where he participated in an elimination match won by N8 Mattson.

Evans also wrestled for several Cleveland, Ohio-based promotions. In March 2006, Evans debuted for the Main Event Wrestling League in Ohio, teaming with Kato to defeat Chris Kole in a handicap match. In December, Evans challenged Robby Starr for the MEWL Championship, but lost the match by disqualification. A rematch in March 2007, saw Starr defeat Evans again. At MEWL's Honky Tonk Saturday Night show the following month, however, Evans defeated Starr and won the MEWL Heavyweight Championship. In July 2006, Evans beat Savage at an Absolute Intense Wrestling (AIW) show. He returned to AIW in May 2007, losing to Thrillbilly, and in September 2007, where he defeated Eddie Kingston by submission in the third round of their 'Strong Style' Challenge match. In April 2007, Evans challenged Jason Bane for the Cleveland All-Pro Wrestling (CAPW) Television Championship, but was unsuccessful. On May 6, at May Meltdown, The B.E.T. (Evans and Josh Emmanuel) defeated Jeff Brooks and Kid Hybrid in a tag team match, and the following month at A Hot Summer's Night The B.E.T. defeated The Clash of Ernie Ballz and Brian Bender.

Evans also wrestled for Pro Wrestling Unplugged, making his debut on October 27, 2007, at Dark Night, where he introduced himself as "The Panther" Tyrone Evans before losing to The Sandman by disqualification. In December, Evans lost once again to The Sandman, before he changed his nickname to "Black Panther" in February 2008 at Last Chance: Do or Die.

=== World Wrestling Entertainment/WWE (2008-2011) ===
==== Florida Championship Wrestling (2008–2010) ====
In 2008, Evans signed a WWE contract and was assigned to Florida Championship Wrestling (FCW), a WWE developmental territory. At WrestleMania XXIV, he appeared as one of the bodyguards for Floyd Mayweather Jr. in Mayweather's match against Big Show. In FCW, he began wrestling under the ring name Tyrone Jones. In May, he feuded with Atlas DaBone. Throughout June and July, he faced wrestlers including Kevin Kiley and TJ Wilson, and on July 21, he lost a dark match to Jamie Noble on July 21 prior to Raw. In September he gained Byron Saxton as a manager, and changed his ring name to Tyson Tarver. He became part of The Saxton Conglomerate, a faction composed of Tarver, Black Pain, Stu Sanders and led by Byron Saxton. Tarver had his first match with the Conglomerate on October 30, where he, Pain and Sanders lost to Johnny Prime, Kafu and Sinn Bowdee. Prime soon began feuding with the Conglomerate, and on November 20, Tarver lost to him in a singles match. On December 18, Tarver and Sanders lost to Prime and Kaleb O'Neal.

In 2009, Evans changed his ring name to 'Michael Tarver'. He continued competing in FCW throughout the remainder of 2009, facing wrestlers including Wes Brisco and Skip Sheffield, with whom he feuded in November 2009. In December, Tarver became associated with Heath Slater, interfering in Slater's matches and accompanying him to the ring. The following month, Tarver began a feud with Titus O'Neil. After twice interrupting O'Neil, Tarver defeated him in a singles match on February 18.

==== The Nexus (2010–2011) ====
On February 16, 2010, it was announced that Tarver was one of the eight FCW wrestlers that would be competing on the first season of the NXT show, with Carlito as his storyline mentor. On the inaugural episode of NXT on February 23, Tarver and Carlito were defeated by Christian and Heath Slater in a tag team match. After six more losses and being ranked second to last in the first Pro's Poll, Tarver picked up his first victory on the May 4 episode of NXT by defeating Daniel Bryan. Tarver also neglected to perform any of the rookie challenges in NXT stating that he was not there to perform menial tasks. On May 11, Tarver was eliminated during the first elimination round of NXT alongside Daniel Bryan as they lacked the confidence to continue in the competition.

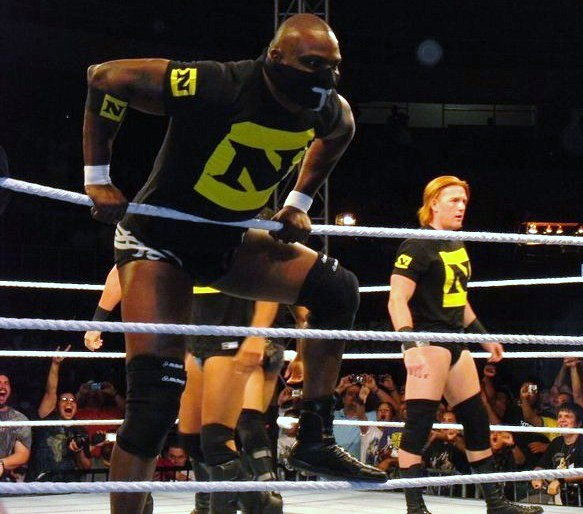
Tarver (left) with Heath Slater (right) at a house show in September 2010.

The week after the NXT season finale, Tarver and the rest of the season one NXT rookies interfered in the main event match between John Cena and CM Punk on Raw, attacking Cena, Punk, the announce team and ring announcer Justin Roberts, before dismantling the ring area and surrounding equipment, turning heel in the process. On the June 14, 2010, edition of Raw the rookies (excluding Daniel Bryan) attacked General Manager Bret Hart, when he refused to give them contracts. The following week on Raw, Vince McMahon fired Hart and announced the hiring of a new general manager, who had signed the seven season one NXT rookies to contracts. The following week the group was named The Nexus.

On the July 12 edition of Raw, The Nexus competed in their first match together, without Darren Young, defeating John Cena in a 6–on–1 handicap match. The Nexus continued to feud with Cena and the Raw roster, resulting in a seven-on-seven elimination tag team match at SummerSlam which saw the return of former Nexus member Daniel Bryan, who aligned himself with team WWE. Tarver was the second person eliminated from the match when he was pinned by John Morrison, and The Nexus went on to lose the match. On the October 4 edition of Raw, Tarver was attacked by Cena, with Barrett later stating that he would have thrown Tarver out of The Nexus anyway, but Cena did him a favor. This storyline was put in place due to Tarver sustaining a groin injury.

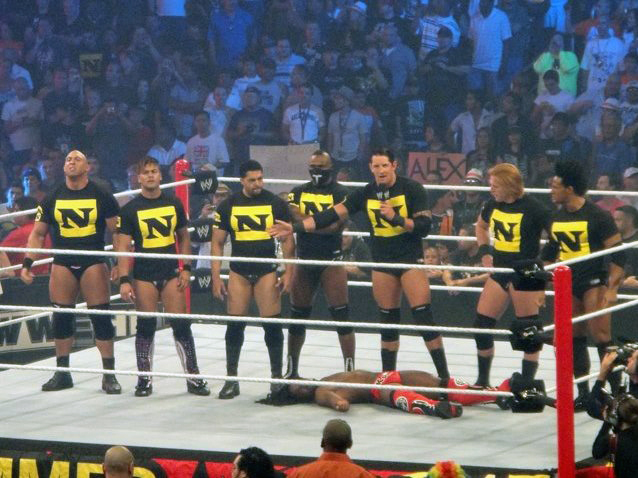
Michael Tarver, after the beat-up of Kofi Kingston, with six others of the original incarnation of The Nexus (L-R): Skip Sheffield, Justin Gabriel, David Otunga, Michael Tarver, Wade Barrett, Heath Slater and Darren Young at SummerSlam.

At the December 9 FCW television tapings, Tarver returned from his injury and defeated Donny Marlow. In 2011, Tarver began mysteriously appearing in the background of backstage segments on both Raw and SmackDown. However, nothing would ultimately come of this and on June 13, 2011, it was announced that Tarver had been released from his contract.

=== National Wrestling Alliance (2011–2014) ===
After his release, he started to wrestle in the independent circuit under his real name but eventually reverted to Michael Tarver. Evans debuted in Florida Underground Wrestling. On March 3, 2012, Tarver defeated Eddie Taurus to become the first FUW Bruiserweight Champion. During his reign as champion, he took on Kahagas for the NWA National Heavyweight Championship but lost. On February 2, 2013, Tarver won the vacant NWA FUW Heavyweight Championship and would lose his Bruiserweight Championship a month later to Bruce Santee. On May 25, 2013, Evans defended the title at FUW Throwdown 3 against TNA wrestler Robbie E. Tarver would go on to lose the NWA Florida Underground heavyweight title in August 2013. On February 21, 2014, at The Silver Screen Showdown, Tarver defeated Matt Morgan to win the NWA FUW Heavyweight Championship. However, Tarver lost the title two weeks later at Ides of March to Wes Brisco.

=== New Japan Pro-Wrestling (2014) ===
On January 6, 2014, New Japan Pro-Wrestling (NJPW) announced that Tarver would be making his debut for the promotion on February 9 at The New Beginning in Hiroshima, representing the National Wrestling Alliance (NWA). In his debut match, Tarver defeated Hiroyoshi Tenzan. Two days later at The New Beginning in Osaka, Tarver teamed with fellow NWA representative Big Daddy Yum-Yum in an NWA World Tag Team Championship number one contender's match, where they were defeated by Tencozy (Tenzan and Satoshi Kojima).

=== Independent circuit (2011–present) ===
Tarver made his first wrestling appearance after being released from WWE, where he began a five-year tenure at Florida Underground Wrestling. He won the FUW Bruiserweight Championship after defeating Eddie Taurus on March 20, 2012. He won the vacant NWA FUW Heavyweight Championship on February 1, 2013, against Deimos, before losing the title six months later on August 31 at NWA FUW Throwdown 6 in a Brass Brass Knuckles On A Pole match against The Grease. He defeated fellow WWE alumni Wes Brisco during the December 12, 2013, edition of NWA FUW. Tarver won the FWA Heavyweight title again on February 21, 2014, defeating the defending champion and fellow WWE superstar Matt Morgan. On December 18, Tarver competed in a Four-Way match in Hard Knock Wrestling for the HKW Championship held by Josh Emanuel against fellow challengers Kombat Kidd and Patrick Hayes.

On September 5, 2014, at Full Impact Pro Fallout, Tarver along Mason Ryan and Shaun Ricker participated in a trios tournament. but were defeated by Full Impact Puerto Ricans (Lince Dorado, Jay Cruz and Jay Rios). On January 9, 2015, at FIP Kickoff 2015 Tarver entered the ring with Martin Stone under the team name MSL Universe. they won their debut match, defeating team Generation Genesis (Jeff Boom & Mitch Mitchell). On April 8, 2016, at FIP Florida Rumble 2016, Tarver wrestled in a battle royal for the number one contender to the FIP World Heavyweight Championship but was defeated by Fred Yehi.

The Nexus reunited for Chikara 2018 King of Trios tournament as The Nexus Alliance, being represented by Fred Rosser (previously Darren Young), Michael Tarver, and PJ Black (previously Justin Gabriel). During 2018 Tarver made three appearances on Ring Warriors television show airing on WGN America. He also wrestled for The Great Khali's Continental Wrestling Entertainment promotion, winning the CWE National Title in a ladder match on November 11, 2018. He would go on to lose the title two days later on the same tour.

Tarver announced his retirement following his final professional wrestling match on May 24, 2026.

== Music career ==
Evans is also a Christian rapper under the name Monster Tarver. Tarver has been showcasing his lyrical talent on his instagram page and released his Control Freestyle called "Monster Control Verse. On January 7, 2022, Tarver released his debut single on digital streaming platforms titled, "Black Roses". On April 29, 2022, Bizzle & Datin announced Monster Tarver as the first artist to sign with God Over Money and Menace Movement as he makes his rap label debut on God Over Money's album Us Against the World with a song called "GOM Menace".

== Championships and accomplishments ==
- Brain Buster Pro Wrestling
  - BBPW Heavyweight Championship (1 time)
- Christian Wrestling Federation
  - Champions Cup (2012) – with Tim Storm
- Continental Wrestling Entertainment
  - CWE Heavyweight Championship (1 time)
  - CWE National Championship (1 time)
- Hard Knock Wrestling
  - HKW Championship (1 time)
- NWA Florida Underground Wrestling
  - NWA Florida Heavyweight Championship (2 times)
  - FUW Bruiserweight Championship (1 time)
- Main Event Wrestling League
  - MEWL Heavyweight Championship (1 time)
- Pro Wrestling eXpress
  - PWX Brass Knuckles Championship (1 time)
- Pro Wrestling Illustrated
  - Feud of the Year (2010) The Nexus vs. WWE
  - Most Hated Wrestler of the Year (2010) As part of The Nexus
  - Ranked No. 132 of the top 500 singles wrestlers in the PWI 500 in 2011
- World Wrestling Entertainment
  - Slammy Award (1 time)
    - Shocker of the Year (2010) The debut of The Nexus
