= The New Beginning (2013) =

Professional wrestling event in Hiroshima, Japan

- Promotional poster for the event, featuring three of its four title matches
- Promotion: New Japan Pro-Wrestling
- Date: February 10, 2013
- City: Hiroshima, Japan
- Venue: Hiroshima Sun Plaza Hall
- Attendance: 4,780

Pay-per-view chronology
← Previous; Wrestle Kingdom 7 in Tokyo Dome	Next → New Japan Cup

The New Beginning chronology
← Previous; 2012	Next → Hiroshima

New Japan Pro-Wrestling events chronology
← Previous; Wrestle Kingdom 7	Next → Invasion Attack

The New Beginning (2013) was a professional wrestling pay-per-view (PPV) promoted by New Japan Pro-Wrestling (NJPW). The event took place on February 10, 2013, in Hiroshima, Hiroshima, at the Hiroshima Sun Plaza Hall. The event featured nine matches, four of which were contested for championships. It was the fourth event under the New Beginning name.

== Storylines ==
The New Beginning featured ten professional wrestling matches that involved different wrestlers from pre-existing scripted feuds and storylines. Wrestlers portrayed villains, heroes, or less distinguishable characters in the scripted events that built tension and culminated in a wrestling match or series of matches.

== Event ==
All four champions were successful in their defenses. Time Splitters (Alex Shelley and Kushida) successfully defended the IWGP Junior Heavyweight Tag Team Championship against the previous champions, Forever Hooligans (Alex Koslov and Rocky Romero), Prince Devitt successfully defended the IWGP Junior Heavyweight Championship against Apollo 55 partner Ryusuke Taguchi, K.E.S. (Davey Boy Smith Jr. and Lance Archer) successfully defended the IWGP Tag Team Championship against previous champions, Tencozy (Hiroyoshi Tenzan and Satoshi Kojima), and Hiroshi Tanahashi defeated Karl Anderson for his seventh successful defense of the IWGP Heavyweight Championship.

== Results ==
No.	Results	Stipulations	Times
1	Jyushin Thunder Liger, Manabu Nakanishi, Tama Tonga, Tiger Mask and Yuji Nagata defeated Chaos (Jado, Takashi Iizuka, Tomohiro Ishii, Toru Yano and Yoshi-Hashi)	Ten-man tag team match	08:20
2	Time Splitters (Alex Shelley and Kushida) (c) defeated Forever Hooligans (Alex Koslov and Rocky Romero)	Tag team match for the IWGP Junior Heavyweight Tag Team Championship	11:26
3	Prince Devitt (c) defeated Ryusuke Taguchi	Singles match for the IWGP Junior Heavyweight Championship	14:01
4	K.E.S. (Davey Boy Smith Jr. and Lance Archer) (c) defeated Tencozy (Hiroyoshi Tenzan and Satoshi Kojima)	Tag team match for the IWGP Tag Team Championship	14:16
5	Togi Makabe defeated Yujiro Takahashi	Singles match	08:00
6	Laughter7 (Katsuyori Shibata and Kazushi Sakuraba) defeated Hirooki Goto and Wataru Inoue	Tag team match	11:07
7	Shinsuke Nakamura defeated Kengo Mashimo	Singles match	11:21
8	Minoru Suzuki (with Taichi) defeated Kazuchika Okada (with Gedo)	Singles match	15:59
9	Hiroshi Tanahashi (c) defeated Karl Anderson	Singles match for the IWGP Heavyweight Championship	25:10
(c) / – the champion(s) heading into the match
