= Wrestle Kingdom 7 =

2013 pro wrestling show in Tokyo, Japan

- Promotional poster for the event, featuring Hiroshi Tanahashi and Kazuchika Okada
- Promotion: New Japan Pro-Wrestling
- Date: January 4, 2013
- City: Tokyo, Japan
- Venue: Tokyo Dome
- Attendance: 29,000
- Tagline: Evolution

Pay-per-view chronology
← Previous; World Tag League	Next → The New Beginning

Wrestle Kingdom chronology
← Previous; 6	Next → 8

New Japan Pro-Wrestling events chronology
← Previous; Power Struggle	Next → The New Beginning

Wrestle Kingdom 7 in Tokyo Dome was a professional wrestling pay-per-view (PPV) event produced by the New Japan Pro-Wrestling (NJPW) promotion, which took place at the Tokyo Dome in Tokyo, Japan on January 4, 2013. It was the 22nd January 4 Tokyo Dome Show and the seventh held under the "Wrestle Kingdom" name. The event featured eleven matches (including two dark matches), five of which were contested for championships.

For the first time, the event was made available for international market on internet pay-per-view (iPPV). The event drew 29,000 fans to the Tokyo Dome, supposedly down from the three previous years, although NJPW president Naoki Sugabayashi revealed that for the first time, the promotion announced a legitimate number of tickets sold instead of a "papered" number of attendees.

The event featured outside participation from All Japan Pro Wrestling (AJPW) representative Keiji Mutoh, Pro Wrestling Zero1 representative Shinjiro Otani, and American freelancer Shelton Benjamin. For the first time in five years, the event did not feature wrestlers from Consejo Mundial de Lucha Libre (CMLL).

== Production ==
Other on-screen personnel
Role:	Name:
Commentators	Shinji Yoshino
Commentators	Shinpei Nogami
Ring announcers	Kimihiko Ozaki
Referees	Kenta Sato
Referees	Marty Asami
Referees	Red Shoes Unno
Referees	Tiger Hattori

=== Background ===
In addition to airing in Japan as a traditional pay-per-view (PPV), the event was for the first time also aired internationally on internet pay-per-view (iPPV).

=== Storylines ===
Wrestle Kingdom 7 featured eleven professional wrestling matches that involved different wrestlers from pre-existing scripted feuds and storylines. Wrestlers portrayed villains, heroes, or less distinguishable characters in the scripted events that built tension and culminated in a wrestling match or series of matches.

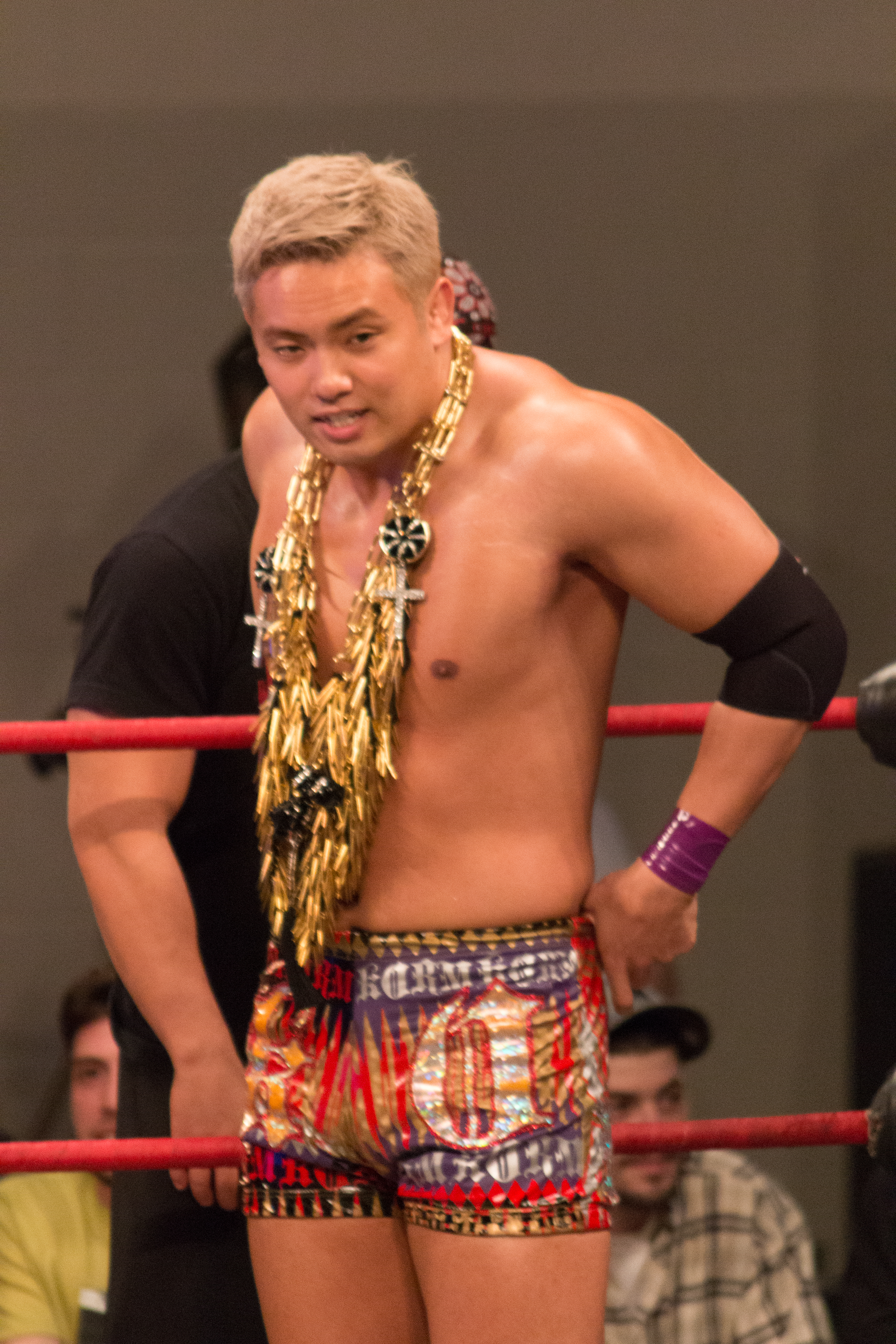
Kazuchika Okada, who challenged for the IWGP Heavyweight Championship in the main event

On August 12, 2012, Kazuchika Okada defeated Karl Anderson in the finals to win the 2012 G1 Climax, winning the tournament in his first attempt, while also breaking the record for the tournament's youngest winner. Okada immediately announced his intention of regaining the IWGP Heavyweight Championship at Wrestle Kingdom 7. Okada then signed a contract for the title match, which was then sealed in a briefcase, which he would be forced to defend until January 4. After successfully defending the contract against Karl Anderson and Hirooki Goto, the Wrestle Kingdom 7 main event was officially set between Okada and IWGP Heavyweight Champion Hiroshi Tanahashi.

The top two matches underneath the main event featured mixed martial artists Kazushi Sakuraba and Katsuyori Shibata. The two had made a surprise return to NJPW on August 12, 2012, and worked several matches during the rest of the year with both remaining undefeated. At the end of the year, Shinsuke Nakamura nominated Sakuraba as his challenger for the IWGP Intercontinental Championship at Wrestle Kingdom 7. Meanwhile, Shibata had entered a rivalry with Togi Makabe, which was set to culminate at Wrestle Kingdom 7.

Wrestle Kingdom 7 was also supposed the feature the NJPW debut of Daichi Hashimoto. The Pro Wrestling Zero1 representative was to be the focal point of a tag team match that would also feature Keiji Mutoh, Hiroyoshi Tenzan and Satoshi Kojima, three wrestlers his father Shinya had had classic matches with during NJPW's heyday. However, on December 27, 2012, it was announced that Hashimoto had fractured his left forearm in a match on Christmas Eve and would be replaced by Zero1 president Shinjiro Otani.

== Event ==
In the main event of Wrestle Kingdom 7, Hiroshi Tanahashi made his sixth successful defense of the IWGP Heavyweight Championship against 2012 G1 Climax winner Kazuchika Okada. In the semi-main event, billed by NJPW as the second of the "double main event", Shinsuke Nakamura made his fourth successful defense of the IWGP Intercontinental Championship against Kazushi Sakuraba. The event also featured a three-way match, where Prince Devitt made his first defense of the IWGP Junior Heavyweight Championship against Low Ki and Kota Ibushi. Low Ki wrestled the match as a protest over NJPW suspending him for a year for refusing to wrestle a show in Fukushima because of the Fukushima Daiichi nuclear disaster. NJPW was reportedly "furious" over Low Ki wrestling a title match in a suit (specifically, a cosplay of Agent 47 from the Hitman video game series) without clearing it with them first to the point that even years later, the company was said to be open to bringing anyone back "with the exception of Low Ki".

Other title matches featured the Killer Elite Squad (Davey Boy Smith Jr. and Lance Archer) making their second successful defense of the IWGP Tag Team Championship against the winners of the 2012 World Tag League, Sword & Guns (Hirooki Goto and Karl Anderson) and Masato Tanaka making his first successful defense of the NEVER Openweight Championship against Shelton Benjamin.

Daichi Hashimoto, who was forced to miss the event due to injury, accompanied Shinjiro Otani to his and Keiji Mutoh's tag team match against Hiroyoshi Tenzan and Satoshi Kojima. After Tenzan had pinned Otani to win the match, Hashimoto had a heated exchange with the winners, slapping Tenzan, who responded with a headbutt.

== Reception ==
Dave Meltzer of the Wrestling Observer Newsletter called Wrestle Kingdom 7 "the best Tokyo Dome show the promotion has ever put on", praising the main event as a "classic world title match". Meltzer also noted that if NJPW were being truthful about the attendance number being the actual number of paid attendees, the show would have to be considered a "huge success" as the last time the company drew a larger attendance number of paid fans to the Tokyo Dome was in 2003.

== Aftermath ==
The day after Wrestle Kingdom 7, Takaaki Kidani resigned from his position as NJPW chairman. Dave Meltzer wrote that while Kidani was an "enthusiastic supporter" of NJPW, his hero in professional wrestling was Eric Bischoff and like Bischoff, he wanted to be a part of the show. Kidani had been the one to sign Kazushi Sakuraba and Katsuyori Shibata and wanted to do a full invasion storyline with shooters. Meltzer noted that the last time NJPW had tried a similar storyline under Antonio Inoki it killed the company's in-ring product. At Wrestle Kingdom 7, Kidani wanted both Sakuraba and Shibata to win and he wanted to personally be in Sakuraba's corner as he became the new Intercontinental Champion. However, a conflict with NJPW bookers Gedo and Jado led to both Sakuraba and Shibata losing and Kidani announcing his resignation. While Kidani left his position inside NJPW, his company Bushiroad retained ownership of NJPW.

== Results ==
No.	Results	Stipulations	Times
1^{D}	Captain New Japan, Tama Tonga and Wataru Inoue defeated Chaos (Jado, Tomohiro Ishii and Yoshi-Hashi)	Six-man tag team match	05:58
2^{D}	Bushi, Kushida and Ryusuke Taguchi defeated Hiromu Takahashi, Jyushin Thunder Liger and Tiger Mask	Six-man tag team match	07:12
3	Akebono, Manabu Nakanishi, MVP and Strong Man defeated Bob Sapp and Chaos (Takashi Iizuka, Toru Yano and Yujiro Takahashi)	Eight-man tag team match	07:53
4	Masato Tanaka (c) defeated Shelton Benjamin	Singles match for the NEVER Openweight Championship	06:41
5	K.E.S. (Davey Boy Smith Jr. and Lance Archer) (c) defeated Sword & Guns (Hirooki Goto and Karl Anderson)	Tag team match for the IWGP Tag Team Championship	10:52
6	Yuji Nagata defeated Minoru Suzuki	Singles match	17:03
7	Prince Devitt (c) defeated Kota Ibushi and Low Ki	Three-way match for the IWGP Junior Heavyweight Championship	14:45
8	Tencozy (Hiroyoshi Tenzan and Satoshi Kojima) defeated Keiji Mutoh and Shinjiro Otani (with Daichi Hashimoto)	Tag team match	15:36
9	Togi Makabe defeated Katsuyori Shibata	Singles match	08:37
10	Shinsuke Nakamura (c) defeated Kazushi Sakuraba	Singles match for the IWGP Intercontinental Championship	11:12
11	Hiroshi Tanahashi (c) defeated Kazuchika Okada	Singles match for the IWGP Heavyweight Championship	33:34
(c) / – the champion(s) heading into the match; D / – this was a dark match
