= Kazuchika Okada =

Japanese professional wrestler (born 1987)

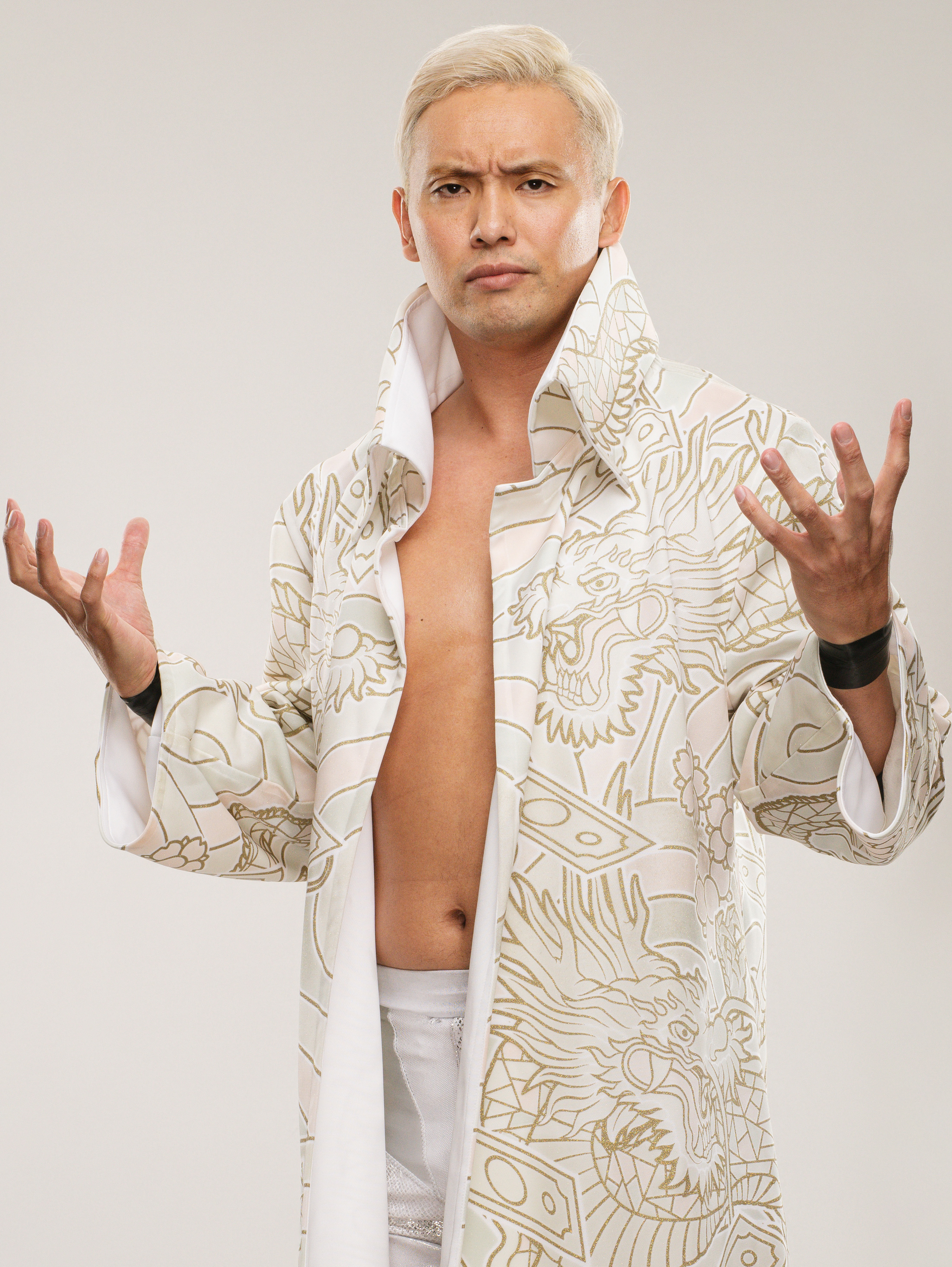
- Okada In 2024

Personal information
- Born: November 8, 1987 (age 39) Anjō, Aichi, Japan
- Spouse: Suzuko Mimori (m. 2019)
- Children: 2

Professional wrestling career
- Ring name(s): Kazuchika Okada; Okada; Suicide; Okato; Dragon George
- Billed height: 1.91 m (6 ft 3 in)
- Billed weight: 107 kg (236 lb)
- Billed from: Aichi, Japan; Anjō, Aichi, Japan
- Trained by: Último Dragón; Yuji Nagata
- Debut: August 29, 2004 (vs. Negro Navarro)

Japanese name
- Kanji: 岡田 和睦
- Hiragana: おかだ かずちか
- Katakana: オカダ・カズチカ
Transcriptions
- Romanization: Okada Kazuchika

Kazuchika Okada (岡田 和睦, Okada Kazuchika; ring name: オカダ・カズチカ; born November 8, 1987) is a Japanese professional wrestler. As of March 2024, he is signed to All Elite Wrestling (AEW), where he is a member of the Don Callis Family stable and is the current AEW International Champion in his second reign. He is also a former AEW World Trios Champion (with Kyle Fletcher and Mark Davis). He is also a former one-time AEW Continental Champion, holding the record for the longest reign in the title's history and the longest for any AEW championship at 647 days. He was also the inaugural and only AEW Unified Champion when he simultaneously held the Continental and International titles together.

Okada is best known for his 18-year original tenure in New Japan Pro-Wrestling (NJPW), where he was a seven-time IWGP Heavyweight Champion, with his fourth reign being the longest in the company's history at 720 days. He also holds the record for most successful title defenses with 12 and the most defenses as the champion with 36.

Initially trained by Último Dragón and making his debut in August 2004, Okada spent his first years in professional wrestling working in Mexico before returning to Japan and making NJPW his home promotion in mid-2007. Originally working as a junior heavyweight, Okada graduated to the heavyweight division in April 2008 with limited success. In February 2010, NJPW sent Okada on a learning excursion to American promotion Total Nonstop Action Wrestling (TNA) where he spent the next 20 months, mainly performing on the promotion's secondary television program, Xplosion. From January to March 2011, he performed under the name Okato on TNA's primary television program, Impact!, as Samoa Joe's sidekick in his rivalry with D'Angelo Dinero.

Okada's run with TNA ended in October 2011 and he returned to NJPW in January 2012, repackaged as the "Rainmaker" (レインメーカー, Reinmēkā), complete with a new look and a villainous persona. Just a month later, Okada defeated Hiroshi Tanahashi to win NJPW's top title, the IWGP Heavyweight Championship, which he would hold for four months before losing it back to Tanahashi. The following August, Okada won NJPW's premier tournament, the G1 Climax. At the end of the year, Tokyo Sports magazine named Okada the 2012 MVP in all of Japanese professional wrestling. The following year, Okada first won the New Japan Cup in March and then regained the IWGP Heavyweight Championship from Tanahashi in April. After a 13-month reign, Okada lost the title in May 2014. Three months later, he won his second G1 Climax. Okada went on to win his third G1 Climax in 2021 and his fourth in 2022, which makes him the wrestler with the second-most wins in the tournament with four, just behind Masahiro Chono with five. Okada won the IWGP Heavyweight Championship three more times and headlined NJPW's biggest annual event—Wrestle Kingdom—nine times (7, 9, 10, 11, 12, 14, 16, 17 and 20). Okada left NJPW in March 2024, immediately signing with AEW.

Considered as one of the greatest professional wrestlers of all time, he became the first Japanese wrestler to top Pro Wrestling Illustrated's list of the top 500 wrestlers in the world in 2017. Readers of the Wrestling Observer Newsletter named him as the most outstanding wrestler of the 2010s in March 2020. Okada's match with Kenny Omega at Dominion 6.9 in Osaka-jo Hall in June 2018 is regarded as one of the greatest professional wrestling matches of all time, and received a rating of seven stars by journalist Dave Meltzer, the highest rating Meltzer has ever awarded a wrestling match. Okada was inducted into the Wrestling Observer Newsletter Hall of Fame in 2021 (his first year of eligibility).

== Early life ==
Okada was born on November 8, 1987, in Anjō, Aichi. As a child, he lived and attended a primary school in Anjō. However, before completing primary school, Okada was lured by the nature in his mother's hometown in the Gotō Islands in Nagasaki Prefecture and chose to complete the rest of his primary education in a special boarding school there. Upon graduation, he returned to Anjō.

In middle school, Okada joined the school's baseball and track team. Although he did not stand out as a baseball player, Okada was able to win first place in a regional 100 meter dash competition. His reputation as a sprinter was good enough to be scouted by high school recruiters. He was exposed to professional wrestling for the first time when one of his older brothers happened to borrow a New Japan Pro-Wrestling (NJPW) video game from his friend.

== Professional wrestling career ==
=== Training and early career (2004–2007) ===
Trained by Último Dragón at his Toryumon professional wrestling school, Okada made his debut on August 29, 2004, losing to Negro Navarro and would spend the next couple of years wrestling primarily in Toryumon Mexico. In December 2005, Okada won the 2005 Young Dragons Cup. Okada would also make appearances in the United States and Canada for promotions such as UWA Hardcore Wrestling and Chikara.

On October 27, 2006, Okada participated in UWA Hardcore Wrestling's 2006 Grand Prix Tournament, but was eliminated in the first round by Puma. The following day, Okada and Último Dragón unsuccessfully challenged Alex Shelley and Chris Sabin for the NWA International Lightweight Tag Team Championship. On November 12, 2006, Okada made his debut for Chikara by defeating Osiris.

During his time in UWA Hardcore Wrestling, Okada also unsuccessfully challenged Josh Prohibition for the UWA Canadian Championship on May 26, 2007. On July 22, 2007, Okada took part in Último Dragón's 20th anniversary show, where he wrestled in a six-man tag team match alongside NJPW wrestlers Jyushin Thunder Liger and Milano Collection A.T. After the match, it was announced that Okada was graduating from Toryumon and joining NJPW.

=== New Japan Pro-Wrestling (2007–2024) ===
==== Young Lion (2007–2010) ====
Upon joining NJPW, Okada entered the NJPW Dojo, where he went through further training. He would have a pre-debut match for the company on August 26, 2007, losing to Tetsuya Naito. A legitimate injury would sideline Okada for the next eight months and upon his return in April 2008 he would be billed as a heavyweight instead of a junior heavyweight, and have his official debut match on April 12, 2008, against Taichi Ishikari. His career would start to pick up steam the following year with breakout performances in the NJPW vs. Pro Wrestling Noah war against the likes of Takashi Sugiura and Go Shiozaki. He would also wrestle main eventers such as Shinsuke Nakamura, Hirooki Goto and Tajiri and—despite losing all of his big matches—he was becoming a big crowd favorite. In January 2010, NJPW announced that they would be sending Okada to Total Nonstop Action Wrestling (TNA) for a developmental tour in order for him to become the wrestler NJPW believed he could be. NJPW president Naoki Sugabayashi predicted the tour could take up to two or three years. On January 31, 2010, Okada was defeated by former four-time IWGP Heavyweight Champion Hiroshi Tanahashi in his NJPW farewell match.

==== Return from excursion (2011–2012) ====
On December 14, 2010, NJPW announced that Okada would be returning to the promotion on January 4, 2011, at Wrestle Kingdom V in Tokyo Dome, where he would team with Hirooki Goto against Noah representatives Takashi Sugiura and Yoshihiro Takayama. On December 23, he made a surprise return to the promotion, performing a German suplex on Takayama, after a match where he and Minoru Suzuki had defeated Yuji Nagata and Wataru Inoue. At Wrestle Kingdom V in Tokyo Dome, Takayama pinned Okada to win the match. After the event, Okada returned to the United States and TNA. Okada returned to NJPW during the NJPW Invasion Tour 2011 (NJPW's first tour of the United States) on May 13 in Rahway, New Jersey, but was defeated by MVP in the first round of a tournament to determine the inaugural IWGP Intercontinental Champion. At the following day's event in New York City, Okada teamed with Ryusuke Taguchi and Togi Makabe in a six-man tag team match, where they were defeated by Davey Richards, Homicide and Rhino. On May 15, during the final day of the tour in Philadelphia, Pennsylvania, Okada teamed with Charlie Haas, Josh Daniels and Tiger Mask in an eight-man tag team match, where they were defeated by Chaos (Shinsuke Nakamura, Gedo, Jado and Yujiro Takahashi). On December 9, 2011, NJPW announced that Okada, having gained 11 kg (24 lb) of muscle to increase his overall weight from 96 kg (212 lb) to 107 kg (236 lb), would be returning to the promotion on January 4, 2012, at Wrestle Kingdom VI in Tokyo Dome, where he would face Yoshi-Hashi, also making his return after a learning excursion to Consejo Mundial de Lucha Libre (CMLL).

==== Feud with Hiroshi Tanahashi (2012–2016) ====
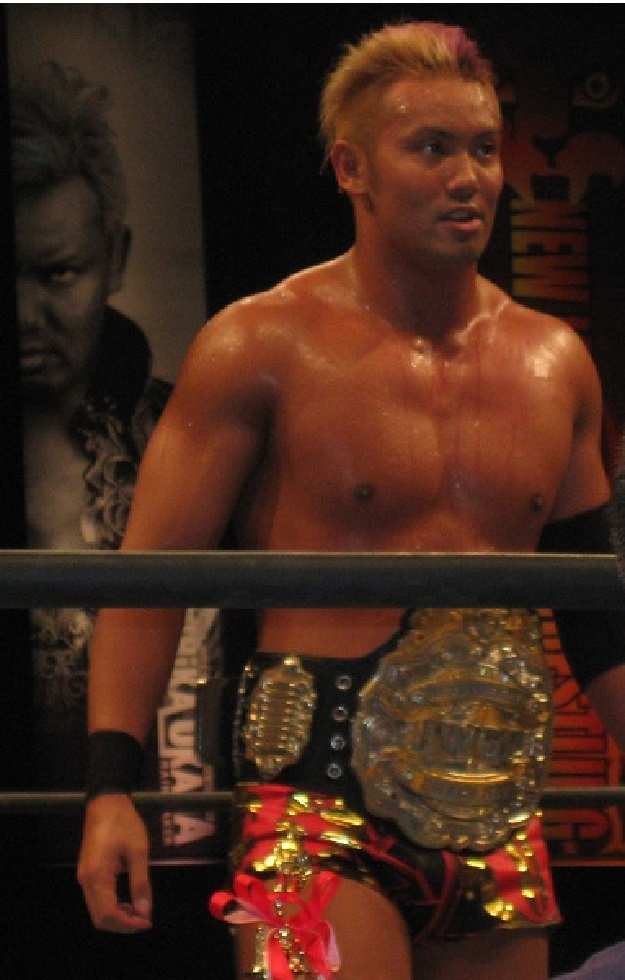
Okada as the IWGP Heavyweight Champion in February 2012

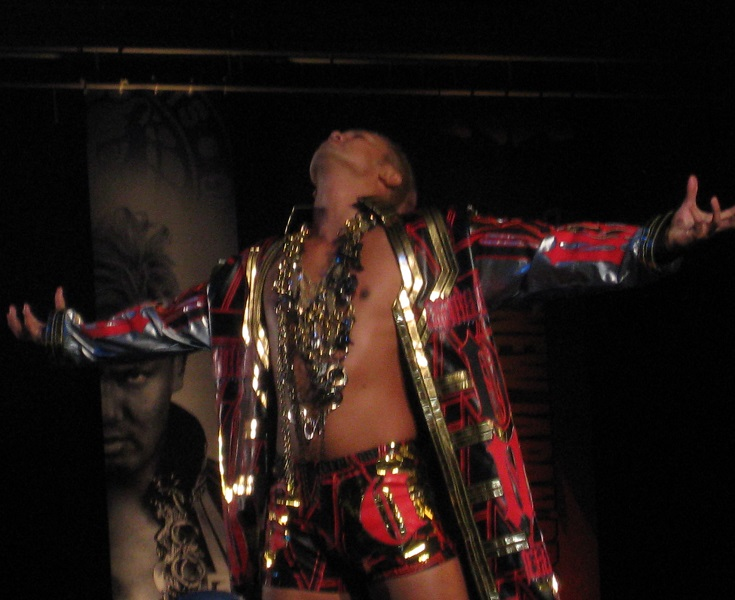
Okada in his Rainmaker pose in February 2012

On January 4, 2012, Okada defeated Yoshi-Hashi in his return match and then challenged Hiroshi Tanahashi to a match for the IWGP Heavyweight Championship following the show's main event. At the following day's press conference, where the title match was made official, Okada revealed that he had joined Chaos, NJPW's top villainous stable, enlisting new stablemate Gedo as his manager and spokesperson. Adopting the new villainous persona of "Rainmaker", Okada changed the Japanese writing of his ring name from "岡田かずちか" to "オカダ・カズチカ". Okada described his new persona as a combination of the three professional wrestling styles he had learned, stating that he took his dropkick from Mexico, his "fighting spirit" from Japan and the "TV and the entertainment" from the United States.

In the month leading to the title match, Okada went on a main event win streak, which included pinning Tanahashi in a tag team match on January 29. On February 12 at The New Beginning, Okada defeated Tanahashi to win the IWGP Heavyweight Championship for the first time. Okada made his first title defense on March 4, defeating Tetsuya Naito in the main event of NJPW's 40th anniversary event. On May 3 at Wrestling Dontaku 2012, Okada defeated 2012 New Japan Cup winner and reigning IWGP Intercontinental Champion Hirooki Goto to make his second successful title defense. On June 16 at Dominion 6.16, Okada lost the IWGP Heavyweight Championship back to Hiroshi Tanahashi, ending his reign at 125 days.

On August 1, Okada entered his first G1 Climax tournament. In the tournament, Okada wrestled in the same block as Chaos leader Shinsuke Nakamura and, on August 5, was defeated by Nakamura, who effectively solidified his spot as the group's leader in the process. However, Okada bounced back from the loss, winning five of his eight round-robin stage matches and finished at the top of his block, advancing to the finals of the tournament. In the finals on August 12, Okada defeated Karl Anderson to win the 2012 G1 Climax. Breaking Masahiro Chono's record for the youngest G1 Climax winner in history, Okada announced that he wanted his shot at the IWGP Heavyweight Championship on January 4, 2013, at Wrestle Kingdom 7 in Tokyo Dome. Okada signed a contract for the Tokyo Dome match on September 6, making him the official number one contender to the IWGP Heavyweight Championship at NJPW's biggest event of the year. However, before January 4, Okada would have to defend his contract as if it were a championship. On October 8 at King of Pro-Wrestling, Okada made his first successful defense of the contract against Karl Anderson. On November 11 at Power Struggle, Okada made another successful defense against Hirooki Goto. Later in the event, after Hiroshi Tanahashi had successfully defended the IWGP Heavyweight Championship against Yujiro Takahashi, the Tokyo Dome title match between him and Okada was made official. From November 20 to December 1, Okada took part in the round-robin portion of the 2012 World Tag League, alongside stablemate Yoshi-Hashi under the team name "Chaos Ride the Lightning". The team finished with a record of three wins and three losses, with a loss to Sword & Guns (Hirooki Goto and Karl Anderson) on the final day, costing them a spot in the semifinals of the tournament. On December 10, Tokyo Sports named Okada the 2012 MVP in all of puroresu. His match with Hiroshi Tanahashi from June 16 was also named the Match of the Year. On January 4, 2013, at Wrestle Kingdom 7 in Tokyo Dome, Okada failed in his title challenge against Tanahashi. On January 15, Okada publicly dismissed rumors that he was going to be signing with WWE and instead announced that he had just signed a contract extension with NJPW.

In February, Okada led Chaos to a war with NJPW's other heel stable, Suzuki-gun, which built to a match on February 10 at The New Beginning, where Okada, positioned as the face, was defeated by the stable's leader Minoru Suzuki, following interference from Taichi. In preparation for the 2013 New Japan Cup, Okada announced that he had created a new submission finishing maneuver, the Red Ink, in order to win the tournament. On March 11, he used the Red Ink to defeat Suzuki-gun member and IWGP Tag Team Champion Lance Archer in his first round match. Six days later, Okada advanced to the semifinals of the tournament with a win over Karl Anderson. On March 23, Okada first defeated Chaos stablemate Toru Yano in the semifinals and then Hirooki Goto in the finals to win the 2013 New Japan Cup and once again become the number one contender to Tanahashi's IWGP Heavyweight Championship. On April 7 at Invasion Attack, Okada defeated Tanahashi to win the IWGP Heavyweight Championship for the second time. On May 3 at Wrestling Dontaku 2013, Okada made his first successful title defense against Minoru Suzuki. His second successful defense took place on June 22 at Dominion 6.22 against Togi Makabe. On July 20, Okada made his third successful title defense against IWGP Junior Heavyweight Champion Prince Devitt. From August 1 to 11, Okada took part in the 2013 G1 Climax, where he opened by losing three of his first four matches. After bouncing back to a three-match win streak and a time limit draw with Hiroshi Tanahashi, Okada finished his tournament with a loss against Satoshi Kojima, which meant that he was eliminated from the tournament. On August 18, Okada made a rare appearance outside of NJPW, when he took part in the DDT Pro-Wrestling promotion's annual Ryōgoku Peter Pan event, defeating Kota Ibushi in a special non-title match. On September 29 at Destruction, Okada avenged the loss from G1 Climax by defeating Satoshi Kojima for his fourth successful defense of the IWGP Heavyweight Championship.

On October 14 at King of Pro-Wrestling, Okada made his fifth successful title defense against Hiroshi Tanahashi in what Tanahashi claimed would be his final challenge for the title. On November 9 at Power Struggle, Okada defeated Karl Anderson in a rematch of the 2012 G1 Climax finals for his sixth successful title defense. Okada and his next challenger, 2013 G1 Climax winner Tetsuya Naito, faced off on November 23 during the first day of the 2013 World Tag League in a match, where Okada and Yoshi-Hashi were victorious over Naito and La Sombra. Okada and Yoshi-Hashi however managed to win only one of their five remaining matches in the tournament and finished second to last in their block, failing to advance to the semifinals. Following a disappointing fan reaction to a confrontation between Okada and Naito, NJPW announced that fans would get to vote whether they or Shinsuke Nakamura and Hiroshi Tanahashi for the IWGP Intercontinental Championship would be the true main event of the Tokyo Dome show. When the results were released on December 9, Okada and Naito had gotten only half the votes Nakamura and Tanahashi had gotten and, as a result, lost their main event spot for NJPW's biggest show of the year. That same day, Okada became the first wrestler in 25 years to win back-to-back MVP awards from Tokyo Sports. On January 4, 2014, at Wrestle Kingdom 8 in Tokyo Dome, Okada defeated Naito for his seventh successful title defense. Okada's eighth successful title defense took place on February 11 at The New Beginning in Osaka, where he defeated Hirooki Goto. On April 6 at Invasion Attack 2014, Okada found himself a new challenger in Bullet Club's newest member, the debuting A.J. Styles, who claimed that Okada was still the same "young boy" (rookie) he had known in TNA. On May 3 at Wrestling Dontaku 2014, Okada's thirteen-month reign as the IWGP Heavyweight Champion came to an end, when he lost the title to Styles in his ninth defense, after Yujiro Takahashi turned on him and Chaos and joined Bullet Club.

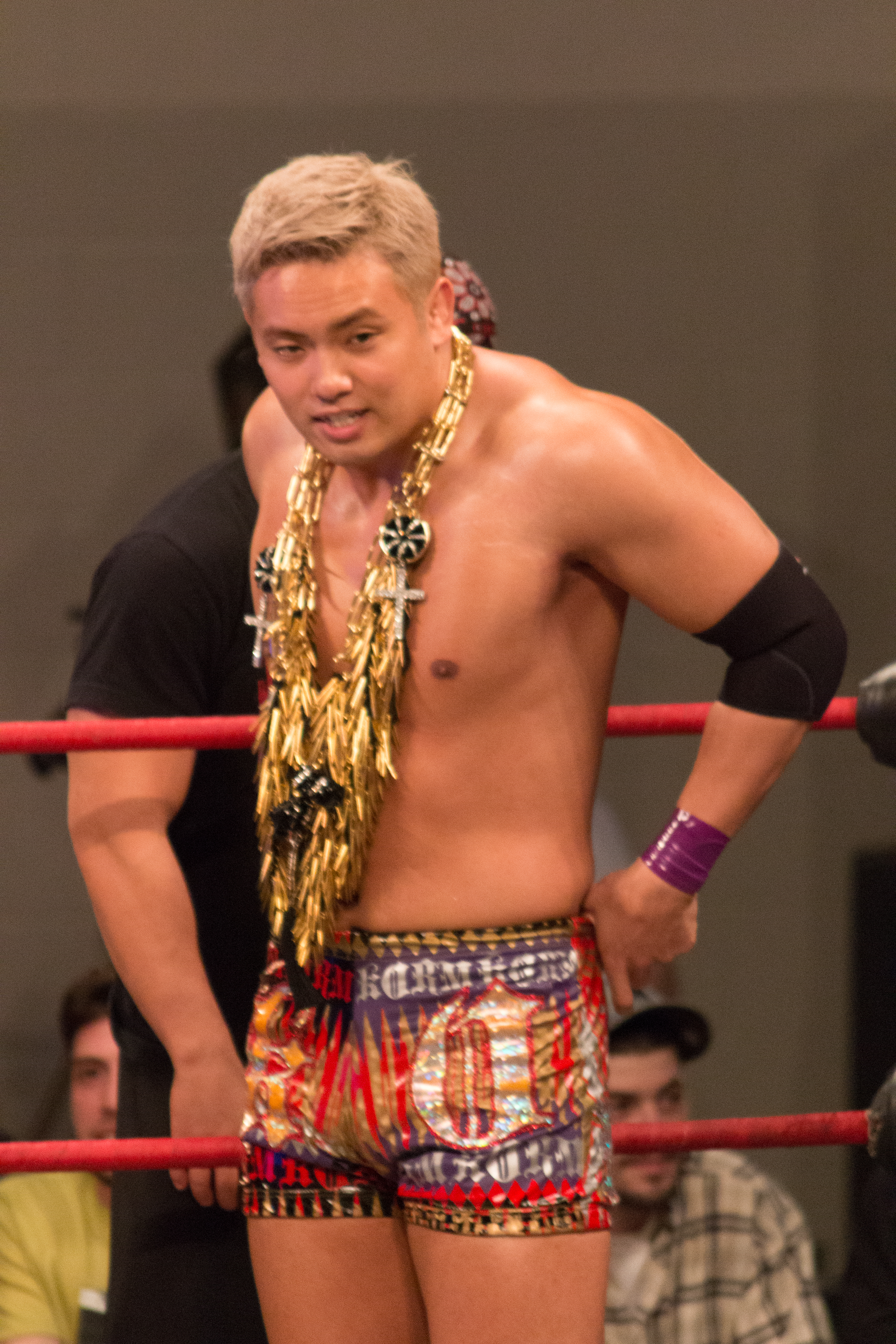
Okada in May 2014

In May, Okada took part in NJPW's North American tour, during which he received a rematch for the IWGP Heavyweight Championship. On May 17 at War of the Worlds in New York City, Okada unsuccessfully challenged Styles for the title in a three-way match, which also included Michael Elgin, whom Styles pinned for the win. Okada received another shot at the title on May 25 at Back to the Yokohama Arena, but was again defeated by Styles. From July 21 to August 8, Okada took part in the 2014 G1 Climax, where he won his block with a record of eight wins and two losses, which included a win over Styles, advancing to the finals. On August 10, Okada defeated Chaos stablemate Shinsuke Nakamura to win the 2014 G1 Climax. On September 21 at Destruction in Kobe, Okada teamed with Yoshi-Hashi to unsuccessfully challenge Bullet Club's Doc Gallows and Karl Anderson for the IWGP Tag Team Championship. Two days later at Destruction in Okayama, Okada successfully defended his IWGP Heavyweight Championship number one contender's contract against Karl Anderson. On October 13 at King of Pro-Wrestling, Okada made another successful defense of his contract against Tetsuya Naito. The following month, Okada once again teamed up with Yoshi-Hashi for the 2014 World Tag League. The team finished their block with a record of four wins and three losses, failing to advance to the finals. On January 4, 2015, at Wrestle Kingdom 9 in Tokyo Dome, Okada received his shot at the IWGP Heavyweight Championship, but was defeated by the defending champion, Hiroshi Tanahashi. Okada then started a storyline, where the loss to Tanahashi had broken him both physically and mentally, causing him to enter a slump. This led to a rivalry between him and Bullet Club's Bad Luck Fale, who scored several pinfall wins over Okada, including in the first round of the 2015 New Japan Cup. Okada finally defeated Fale in a singles match on April 5 at Invasion Attack 2015, after which he announced his intention of regaining the IWGP Heavyweight Championship by attacking A.J. Styles at the conclusion of the event.

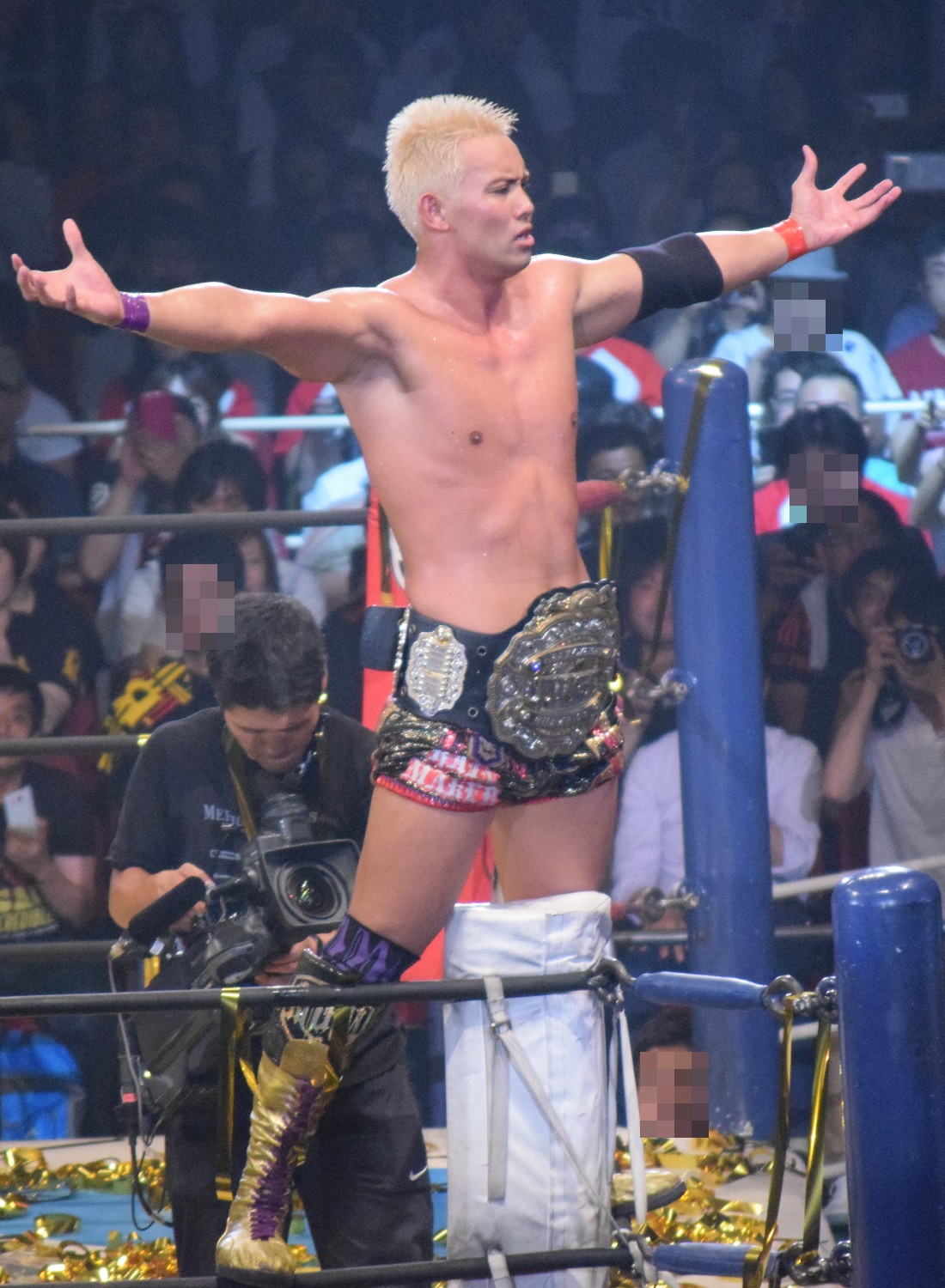
Okada celebrating after capturing the IWGP Heavyweight Championship for the third time in July 2015

On July 5 at Dominion 7.5 in Osaka-jo Hall, Okada defeated Styles to win the IWGP Heavyweight Championship for the third time. From July 23 to August 15, Okada took part in the 2015 G1 Climax. He entered the final day with a chance to advance from his block, but a loss against Chaos stablemate Shinsuke Nakamura cost him a spot in the finals, giving him a record of seven wins and two losses. On August 16, Okada had a staredown with Genichiro Tenryu, who chose him to be his opponent in his retirement match. On November 15 at Revolution Final, Okada defeated Tenryu in his retirement match. On December 7, Okada won his third MVP award from Tokyo Sports, while his match with Tenryu was named the Match of the Year. With the win, Okada became only the fifth three-time MVP award winner. In December 2015, Okada signed a one-year contract extension with NJPW. However, following A.J. Styles and Shinsuke Nakamura's departures from the promotion the following month, NJPW owner Takaaki Kidani announced that the promotion was scrapping the one-year contract system and was looking to offer Okada, their top priority, a new five-year ¥200 million contract. On January 4, 2016, Okada defeated 2015 G1 Climax winner Hiroshi Tanahashi in the main event of Wrestle Kingdom 10 in Tokyo Dome to retain the IWGP Heavyweight Championship and becoming the new ace of the promotion, the match at that time was the longest in the history of the January 4 Dome Show .

==== Longest-reigning IWGP Heavyweight Champion (2016–2018) ====
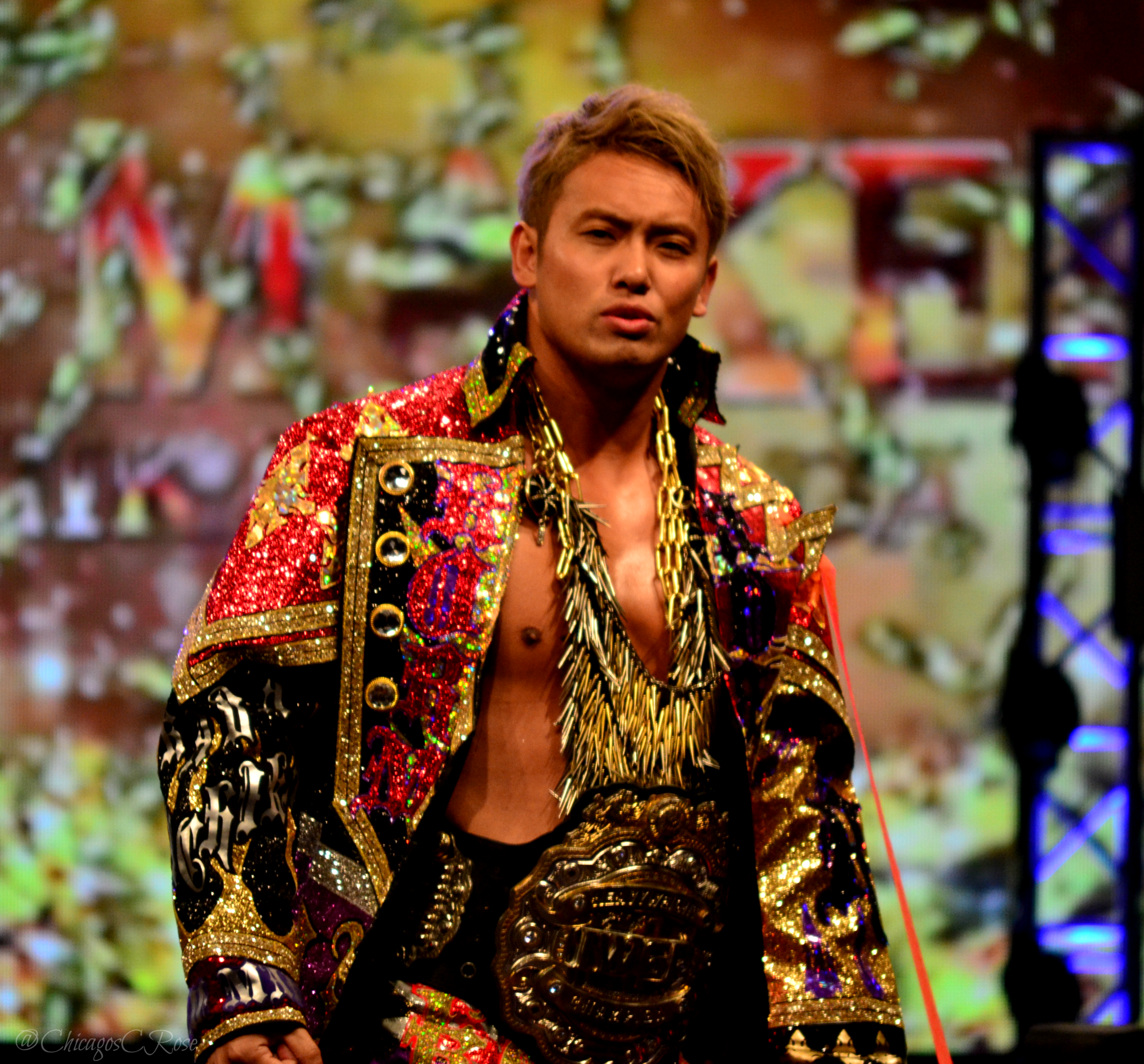
Okada as the IWGP Heavyweight Champion in February 2016

Okada made his third successful title defense on February 11 at The New Beginning in Osaka against Hirooki Goto. On April 10 at Invasion Attack 2016, Okada lost the IWGP Heavyweight Championship to 2016 New Japan Cup winner Tetsuya Naito, following outside interference from Naito's Los Ingobernables de Japón stablemates Bushi, Evil and the debuting Sanada. Okada gained revenge on Sanada by defeating him on May 3 at Wrestling Dontaku 2016. This led to a rematch with Naito on June 19 at Dominion 6.19 in Osaka-jo Hall, where Okada won the IWGP Heavyweight Championship for the fourth time. From July 18 to August 12, Okada took part in the 2016 G1 Climax, where he finished tied second in his block with a record of five wins, one draw and three losses. A 30-minute time limit draw against Hiroshi Tanahashi on the final day eliminated both men from advancing to the finals. During the G1 Climax, Okada was defeated by Pro Wrestling Noah representative Naomichi Marufuji, which led to his first title defense following the tournament on October 10 at King of Pro-Wrestling, where Okada retained the IWGP Heavyweight Championship against Marufuji, thus setting up the main event of Wrestle Kingdom 11 in Tokyo Dome between Okada and the 2016 G1 Climax winner Kenny Omega. On December 14, Okada became the second wrestler to win three consecutive Match of the Year awards from Tokyo Sports for his 2016 G1 Climax opener against Naomichi Marufuji.

On January 4, 2017, Okada successfully defended the IWGP Heavyweight Championship against Kenny Omega at Wrestle Kingdom 11 in Tokyo Dome. At 46 minutes and 45 seconds, the match was the longest in the history of the January 4 Tokyo Dome Show until the main event of Wrestle Kingdom 15. Wrestling journalist Dave Meltzer, in his Wrestling Observer Newsletter, gave the match a six-star rating. He added that Okada and Omega "may have put on the greatest match in pro wrestling history" and that it was the best match he had ever seen. The match was also praised by the likes of Daniel Bryan, Mick Foley and Stone Cold Steve Austin. The day after Wrestle Kingdom 11, Okada and Chaos were attacked by the returning Minoru Suzuki and his Suzuki-gun stable, which led to his third title defense on February 5 at The New Beginning in Sapporo, where he defeated Suzuki. Okada's fourth defense took place on April 9 at Sakura Genesis 2017, where he defeated 2017 New Japan Cup winner Katsuyori Shibata. Okada's fifth defense took place on May 3 at Wrestling Dontaku 2017, where he defeated Bad Luck Fale. After the match, Okada nominated Omega as his next challenger for the championship. The rematch between Okada and Omega on June 11 at Dominion 6.11 in Osaka-jo Hall ended in NJPW's first 60-minute time limit draw in 12 years, meaning that Okada was successful in his sixth defense. Okada's seventh title defense took place during the first night of G1 Special in USA on July 1, where he defeated Cody. Okada then entered the 2017 G1 Climax, where he finished with a record of six wins, one draw and two losses, failing to advance to the finals due to losing to Kenny Omega in their third match against each other on August 12. On October 9 at King of Pro-Wrestling, Okada avenged a loss suffered during the 2017 G1 Climax by making his eighth successful title defense against Evil, setting him up against G1 Climax winner Tetsuya Naito in the main event of Wrestle Kingdom 12.

On October 22, Okada became the longest-reigning IWGP Heavyweight Champion in history by breaking the previous record of 489 days, held by Shinya Hashimoto. On January 3, 2018, Okada also broke Hiroshi Tanahashi's record of 1,358 combined days as champion. The following day at Wrestle Kingdom 12, Okada defeated Tetsuya Naito to retain the title. On February 10 at The New Beginning in Osaka, Okada defeated Sanada to retain the championship for the tenth time. On March 21, Okada was challenged for the title by New Japan Cup winner Zack Sabre Jr. and at Sakura Genesis went on to defeat Sabre to tie Hiroshi Tanahashi's record for most successful title defenses in one reign at 11 defenses. After the match, Okada was confronted by Tanahashi, indicating a future match for the title. They met at Wrestling Dontaku 2018, where Okada defeated Tanahashi for his record-breaking 12th successful title defense, breaking Tanahashi's record of 11, and earning a 5 1/2 Star rating from Wrestling Observer Newsletter. His next challenger was then revealed to be Kenny Omega, having been chosen due to Okada's frustration with having one win, draw, and loss against him. In their fourth match, they competed in a two out of three falls match at Dominion 6.9 in Osaka-jo Hall (with no time limit to ensure there is no possibility of a draw as in their second singles match at Dominion 6.11), where Omega defeated Okada 2–1 to win the championship after a 65-minute match, ending Okada's record-breaking championship reign at 720 days.

==== Gedo's betrayal and various feuds (2018–2021) ====
Okada then entered the 2018 G1 Climax, where he finished with a record of six wins, one draw and two losses, exactly the same as the previous year's event, failing to advance to the finals. The event saw a change of image for Okada following the defeat by Omega, with his hair dyed red and portraying an indifferent attitude. This caused him to lose his first two matches against Jay White and Bad Luck Fale, although he would go on to the win the rest of the matches in his block, until the last one; another 30-minute time limit draw against Tanahashi. At the 2018 G1 Climax Finals, Okada parted ways with his longtime manager Gedo. Unsatisfied by their draw in the G1, Tanahashi opted to defend the contract for his Wrestle Kingdom 13 title shot against Okada. On September 23 at Destruction in Kobe, Okada was defeated by Tanahashi.

Afterwards, he was attacked by Jay White before Gedo, his former manager, came out seemingly to stop him, only to betray Okada by hitting him in the back with a chair. This led to a match between White and Okada at Wrestle Kingdom 13, where he was defeated. In March, Okada competed in the New Japan Cup. He defeated Michael Elgin in the first round, and fellow Chaos members Mikey Nicholls, Will Ospreay, and Tomohiro Ishii in the second round, the quarter-finals, and semi-finals, respectively. He went on to defeat Sanada in the finals of the tournament and win his second New Japan Cup. In doing so, he won the opportunity to challenge Jay White at New Japan/Ring of Honor joint show, G1 Supercard, for the IWGP Heavyweight Championship. At the event on April 6, Okada defeated White to win the title for the fifth time.

Okada then successfully defended his title against Sanada on the second night of the Wrestling Dontaku 2019 event. Then, Okada successfully defended his title against Chris Jericho at Dominion 6.9 for his second title defense. At Royal Quest, Okada defeated Minoru Suzuki for his third title defense, subsequently going on retain the title again at King of Pro Wrestling vs Sanada which would set up a title match with G1 Climax winner Kota Ibushi at Wrestle Kingdom 14. On the first night of the two-day event, Okada retained the Championship against Ibushi, enabling him to advance to the Double Gold Dash Title-For-Title Match on Night 2, where Okada's fifth reign was ended by IWGP Intercontinental Champion Tetsuya Naito.

Okada then entered a feud with Taichi, where at night two of The New Beginning in Sapporo, Okada defeated Taichi. Okada was then announced to be facing Jay White in the first round of the New Japan Cup, however due to the COVID-19 pandemic, all New Japan Cup and further New Japan events were postponed. Okada defeated Gedo in the first round of the New Japan Cup, followed by subsequent victories over Yuji Nagata, Taiji Ishimori, and Hiromu Takahashi, before losing to Evil in the final.

At Dominion in Osaka-jo Hall, Okada was on the losing side of a tag team match, teaming with Goto against Bullet Club's Yujiro Takahashi and Taiji Ishimori, when Takahashi pinned Goto. This began a small feud with Takahashi, culminating in Okada defeating him at Sengoku Lord in Nagoya on July 25. During a post-match interview, Okada teased a "controversial announcement". Three days later, during a press conference, NJPW chairman Naoki Sugabayashi alongside Okada announced the creation of the KOPW Championship; Okada then proceeded to introduce the title and its concept, also announcing KOPW 2021 for the following year. The tournament to crown the inaugural champion began on August 26 with four first round matches leading to a four-way final at Summer Struggle in Jingu. In the first round, Okada was paired off against Takahashi and the fans were allowed to vote for the stipulations online on the social networking service Twitter. Fans had the choice to vote for either a three-on-one handicap match including Gedo and Jado (Okada's choice) or a lumberjack with leather belts match (Takahashi's choice); fans voted for the former. On August 26, Okada soundly defeated his three opponents but would lose to stablemate Toru Yano three days later in the final which also included El Desperado and Sanada. From September 19 until October 16, Okada took part in G1 Climax 30 as part of block A, finishing the tournament with a record of six wins and three losses. Going into the final day of block A matches, Okada had a slim chance to qualify for the final needing a victory against Ospreay and for both Kota Ibushi and Jay White to lose their respective matches. However, Ospreay's girlfriend Bea Priestley and the returning Great-O-Khan interfered in the match, helping earn victory for Ospreay and ending Okada's tournament. Afterwards, Ospreay cemented his heel turn by attacking Okada and would officially leave Chaos to start a new faction named The Empire. Following the tournament, Okada was gunning for revenge against Ospreay for his actions. On November 7, at Power Struggle, Okada defeated O-Khan via referee's decision. Post match, he was confronted by Ospreay who challenged him to a match at Wrestle Kingdom 15, which Okada accepted. On January 4, 2021, at night one of Wrestle Kingdom 15, Okada defeated Ospreay.

==== Championship reigns and departure (2021–2024) ====
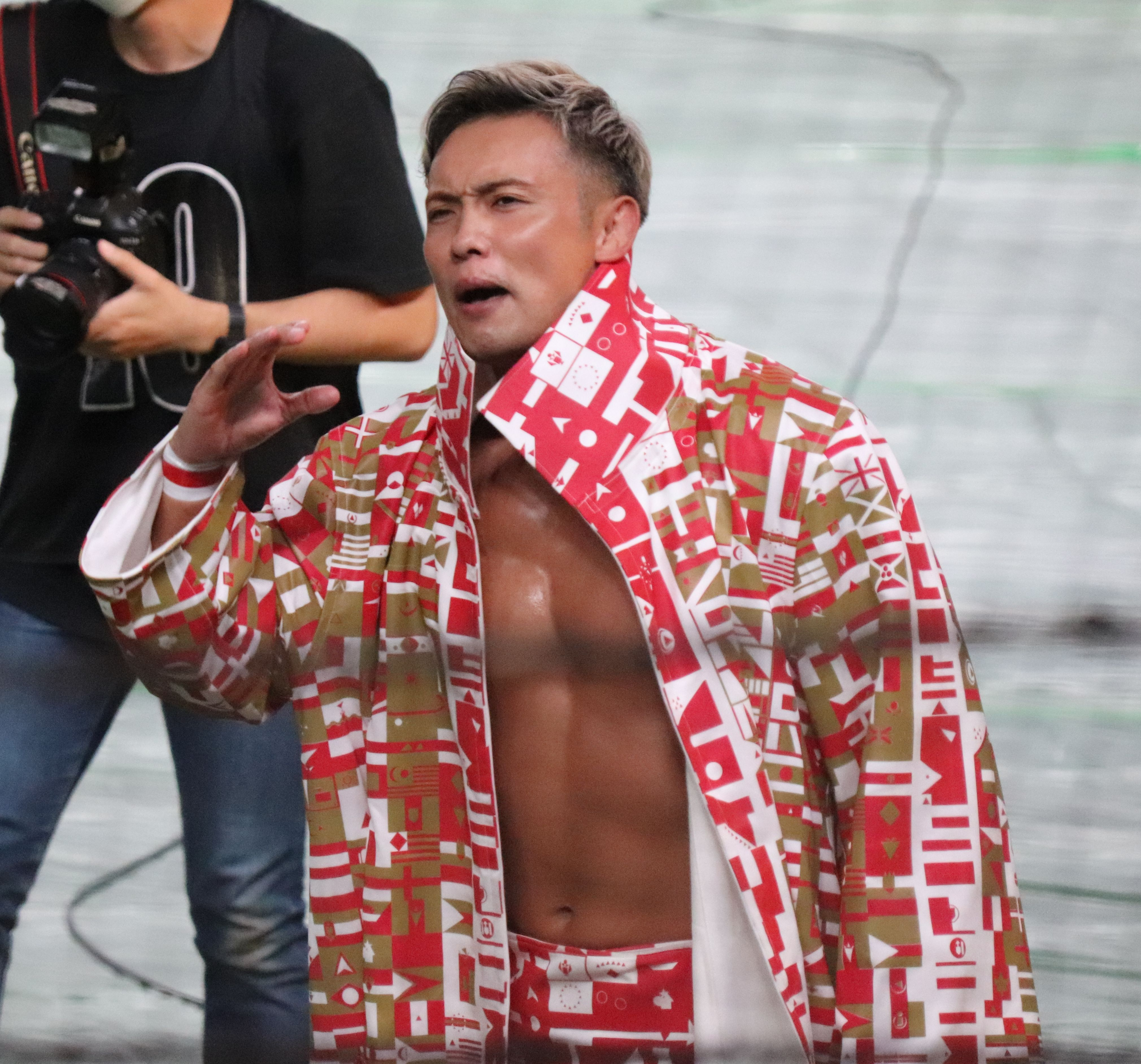
Okada in September 2021

Following Will Ospreay relinquishing the IWGP World Heavyweight Championship after Wrestling Dontaku, Okada faced Shingo Takagi at Dominion 6.6 in Osaka-jo Hall in a losing effort for the vacant title. In October 2021, Okada would win the G1 Climax for the third time in his career, finishing top of his block with 16 points (a joint record for ten-man G1 blocks) and defeating Kota Ibushi in the tournament finals, and earning himself another shot at Takagi and the championship. After winning the G1, Okada requested that, instead of the usual briefcase and contract for the title shot at Wrestle Kingdom, he be awarded the former IWGP Heavyweight Championship belt which Ibushi had retired earlier in 2021. Okada's request was approved and he appeared at Road to Power Struggle on October 25 with the belt, and he would defeat Tama Tonga at the event to retain the certificate. On November 13, Okada returned to the United States to defeat Buddy Matthews at Battle in the Valley. On night one of Wrestle Kingdom 16, Okada defeated Takagi to win the IWGP World Heavyweight Championship for the first time. On night two, he would also retain it against a returning Ospreay. On night three, Okada teamed with Hiroshi Tanahashi to defeat Pro Wrestling Noah's Keiji Muto and Kaito Kiyomiya.

Okada's second title defense came on February 20, during the NJPW New Years Golden Series, where he defeated Tetsuya Naito. Okada once again teamed with Tanahashi alongside Tatsumi Fujinami to defeat Zack Sabre Jr., Minoru Suzuki and Yoshiaki Fujiwara, at the NJPW 50th Anniversary Show on March 1. On April 9, Okada defeated Sabre, who had won the New Japan Cup, at Hyper Battle. On May 1, Okada once again defeated Naito at Wrestling Dontaku. After being attacked by the returning Jay White, Okada was scheduled to face White at Dominion 6.12 in Osaka-jo Hall. White defeated Okada for the World Championship at the event, ending Okada's reign at 159 days.

Also at Dominion, Okada was announced to be part of the G1 Climax 32 tournament in July, where he would compete in the A Block. He finished with 10 points, only losing once to Jonah, to advance to the semi-finals. In the semi-final round, Okada defeated B Block winner Tama Tonga. In the final, Okada defeated Ospreay to win his second consecutive and fourth overall G1 Climax. The following day, during a press conference, instead of receiving a briefcase containing a contract for a title shot at Wrestle Kingdom, Okada proposed the winner of the G1 Climax should be automatically inserted into the main event at the Tokyo Dome, instead of defending his title shot. On October 10 at Declaration of Power, Okada avenged a loss suffered during the 2022 G1 Climax by defeating Jonah. Later that night, Okada confronted Jay White, after he successfully defended the IWGP World Heavyweight Championship, setting up the main event for Wrestle Kingdom 17. On December 15, Okada won his fifth MVP award from Tokyo Sports, while his match with Will Ospreay was named the Match of the Year. With his fifth overall MVP award, he is just one behind Antonio Inoki in most overall MVP Awards. On January 4, 2023, at Wrestle Kingdom 17, Okada defeated White, regaining the IWGP World Heavyweight Championship. The following day at New Year Dash, Okada teamed with longtime rival and new IWGP United States Heavyweight Champion, Kenny Omega to defeat United Empire's Aaron Henare and Jeff Cobb.

Following his victory at Wrestle Kingdom 17, Okada began an interpromotional rivalry with Kiyomiya, who was the reigning GHC Heavyweight Champion at Pro Wrestling Noah. The feud began when at night two of Wrestle Kingdom 17, a tag-team match between NJPW's Okada and Togi Makabe and Noah's Kiyomiya and Yoshiki Inamura, broke down as Okada and Kiyomiya continuously brawled outside the ring, due to Kiyomiya kicking Okada in the head and causing him to bleed, which infuriated Okada. This caused the match to end in a no-contest as Makabe and Inamura attempted to restrain their partners. The rivalry intensified when Okada attacked Kiyamoya at Noah Great Voyage in Osaka, following Kiyomiya's successful title defense. A few weeks later, Okada made his first IWGP World Heavyweight title defense on February 11 at The New Beginning in Osaka, defeating Shingo Takagi. Okada made a second successful title defense the following week at Battle in the Valley, defeating Hiroshi Tanahashi. On February 21, Okada defeated Kiyomiya at Keiji Muto Grand Final Pro-Wrestling "Last" Love. Okada lost the IWGP World Heavyweight Championship at Sakura Genesis to New Japan Cup winner Sanada, ending his second reign at 94 days.

On May 3, at Wrestling Dontaku, Okada teamed with Ishii and Tanahashi to defeat Strong Style (Suzuki, El Desperado and Ren Narita) to win the NEVER Openweight 6-Man Tag Team Championship, marking Okada's first non-world/heavyweight championship and first ever tag team championship in his entire wrestling career. At the Dominion 6.4 in Osaka-jo Hall event on June 4, Okada, Ishii and Tanahashi successfully defended the NEVER Openweight 6-Man Tag Team Championship against Blackpool Combat Club (BCC) (Jon Moxley and Claudio Castagnoli) and Shota Umino). After the match, Moxley announced that he had an announcement for Okada, leading to a pre-taped video being shown, involving Moxley and Castagnoli's BCC teammate Bryan Danielson, who challenged Okada to a future match. In a NJPW press conference two days after the event, Okada officially accepted Danielson's challenge, setting up a match between the two at Forbidden Door. Before the event, Okada represented NJPW at All Together Again, which was a co-event between Japan's top three wrestling promotions, teaming with All Japan Pro Wrestling's (AJPW) Yuma Aoyagi and Pro Wrestling Noah's (Noah) Kenoh to defeat Kento Miyahara (AJPW), Kaito Kiyomiya (Noah) and Hiroshi Tanahashi (NJPW).

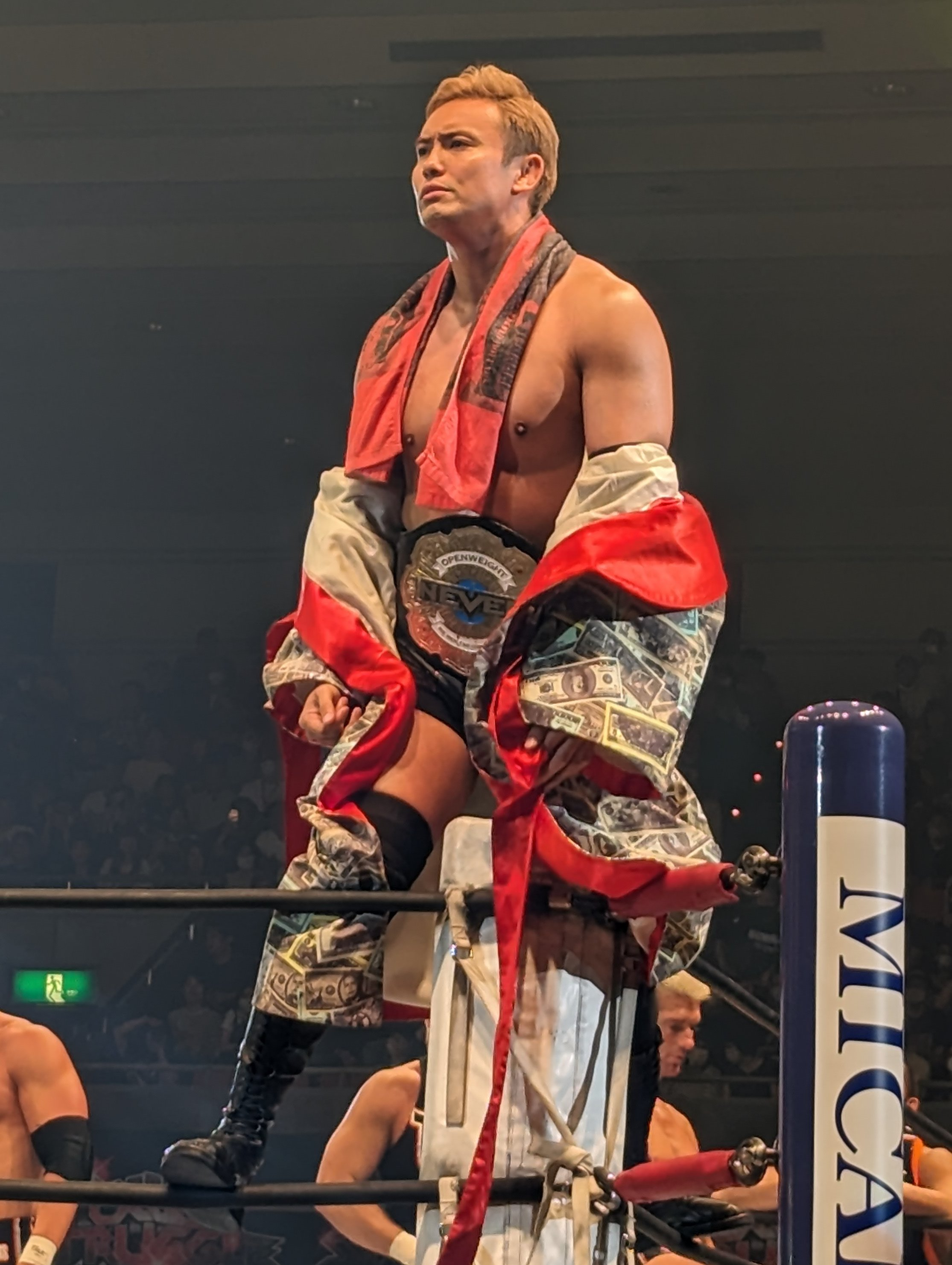
Okada as one-third of the NEVER Openweight 6-Man Tag Team Champions in November 2023

Following a loss to Danielson at Forbidden Door, Okada attempted to rebound by competing in the annual G1 Climax tournament in July. Okada would compete in the B Block, finishing with a near-perfect record of 12 points, after losing to rival Will Ospreay. Despite this, Okada finished top of the block, thus advancing him to the quarterfinal round. Okada went on to defeat both Zack Sabre Jr and Evil to advance to the finals. In the tournament final, Okada lost to Tetsuya Naito, marking Okada's first-ever loss in a G1 final. Okada, Tanahashi and Ishii continued defending their Never Openweight 6-man tag-team Championships, defeating Impact Wrestling's Motor City Machine Guns (Alex Shelley and Chris Sabin) and Josh Alexander, at Destruction in Ryōgoku in October. Another successful title defense was made the following month at Power Struggle, where the trio defeated TMDK (Mikey Nicholls, Shane Haste and Zack Sabre Jr.). After the match, Bryan Danielson appeared on the titantron, challenging Okada to a rematch at Wrestle Kingdom 18, which Okada immediately accepted. On January 4, 2024, at Wrestle Kingdom 18, Okada defeated Danielson, avenging his loss at Forbidden Door. Following the match, the two men bowed to each other, showing their mutual respect.

In January 2024, NJPW announced that Okada would not be renewing his contract at the end of that month, and would cease being a full-time performer for the company after fulfilling his dates at The New Beginning series of events a month later. On January 24, after successfully defending the NEVER Openweight 6-Man Tag Team Championship against TMDK (Kosei Fujita, Mikey Nicholls and Shane Haste), Okada decided to vacate the titles, due to him leaving NJPW, ending their reign at 266 days. On February 11 at The New Beginning in Osaka, Okada defeated Hiroshi Tanahashi. Okada wrestled his last match as a NJPW talent on night 2 of The New Beginning in Sapporo, teaming with fellow Chaos members Hiroki Goto, Yoshi-Hashi, Tomohiro Ishii, and Toru Yano, in a winning effort against United Empire and Matt Riddle.

=== Total Nonstop Action Wrestling (2010–2011, 2024) ===
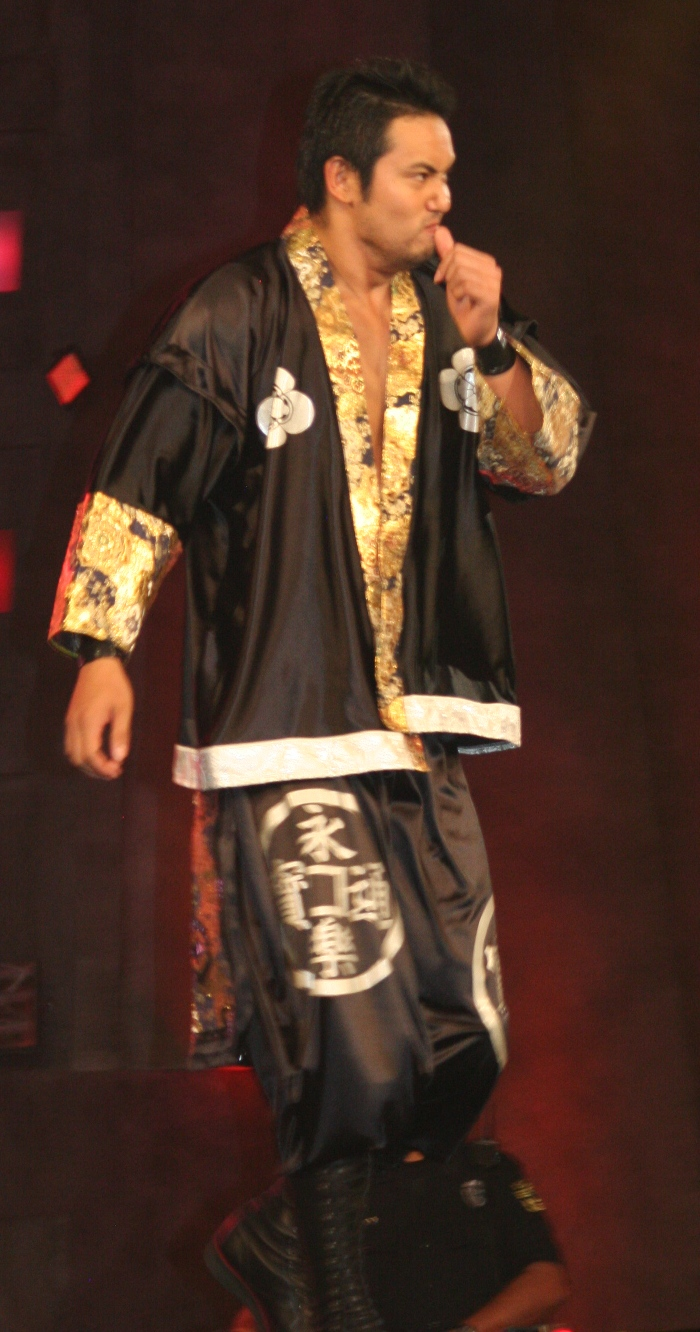
Okada at a TNA Xplosion taping in July 2010

Okada made his TNA debut at the February 16, 2010, tapings of Impact!, losing to Alex Shelley in a dark match. At the March 9 tapings, Okada was defeated by Jay Lethal in another dark match. On March 20, Okada made his debut for Jersey All Pro Wrestling (JAPW) at Wild Card VI, where he was defeated by fellow TNA wrestler Samoa Joe. Okada's dark matches for TNA continued on March 23 with a loss against Daniels. On April 6, Okada, using only his last name, competed in his first televised TNA match when he and Homicide were defeated by Generation Me (Jeremy and Max Buck) in a tag team match, which was later broadcast on the Xplosion television program and the company's official website and YouTube channel. That same week, Okada also began wrestling at TNA's live events. On May 4, Okada and Homicide were defeated in another Xplosion match by Ink Inc. (Jesse Neal and Shannon Moore). On May 17, X Division Champion Douglas Williams defeated Okada in a non-title Xplosion match. On July 15, Okada made his first appearance on Impact!, running out to the ring in an attempt to stop former ECW wrestlers from taking over the show. At the August 9 tapings, Okada picked up his first victory in TNA, defeating Kid Kash in a dark match. On the October 8 Xplosion, Okada formed a tag team with compatriot Kiyoshi, but the two of them were then defeated in their first match together by Ink Inc. On the November 26 Xplosion, Okada was defeated by Rob Terry. On the December 17 Xplosion, Okada was defeated by Stevie Richards. Okada and Kiyoshi had a rematch with Ink Inc. at the December 7 tapings of Xplosion, but were once again defeated.

On January 20, 2011, Okada turned into a fan favorite as he made his second appearance on Impact!, when he was revealed as the camera man whom Samoa Joe had hired to follow D'Angelo Dinero in order to expose his lies about helping the needy. During the appearance, Okada debuted a new look inspired by Kato from The Green Hornet series. Okada, now renamed Okato, made his first TNA pay-per-view appearance at Against All Odds on February 13, preventing Dinero from leaving the ring during his match with Joe. After losing the match, Dinero attacked both Okato and Joe. Okato made his Impact! in-ring debut on March 24, when he defeated Dinero via disqualification. The match concluded Okato's participation in the feud between Joe and Dinero and he subsequently returned to performing under his real surname. On the June 21 Xplosion, Okada was defeated by Alex Shelley in the first round of the Xplosion Championship Challenge. On October 13, his profile was removed from TNA's roster page.

TNA's handling of Okada was reportedly one of the reasons NJPW ceased the relationship between the two promotions shortly afterwards. Despite not being used by TNA, Okada has stated that he felt that his time in the promotion was beneficial to him as he learned he needed more than just a good match—he needed a character. According to Okada, in Japanese professional wrestling "there is no character – it's fight, fight, fight", but TNA's agents kept telling him that he needed a character, which led to him creating the "Rainmaker" persona upon his return to NJPW. In October 2017, it was reported that while representatives of the American promotion, now known as Impact Wrestling, were visiting Japan, attempting to revive the relationship between their company and NJPW, they specifically apologized to Okada for his treatment.

After thirteen-years, Okada returned to TNA on the January 13, 2024 episode of Impact!, teaming with the Motor City Machine Guns (Alex Shelley and Chris Sabin) to defeat The System (Brian Myers, Eddie Edwards, and Moose).

=== Consejo Mundial de Lucha Libre (2018) ===
On August 17, 2018, Okada, with Negro Casas and Último Guerrero, defeated Diamante Azul, Valiente and Místico in Arena México.

=== All Elite Wrestling (2022–present) ===
==== Sporadic appearances (2022–2023) ====
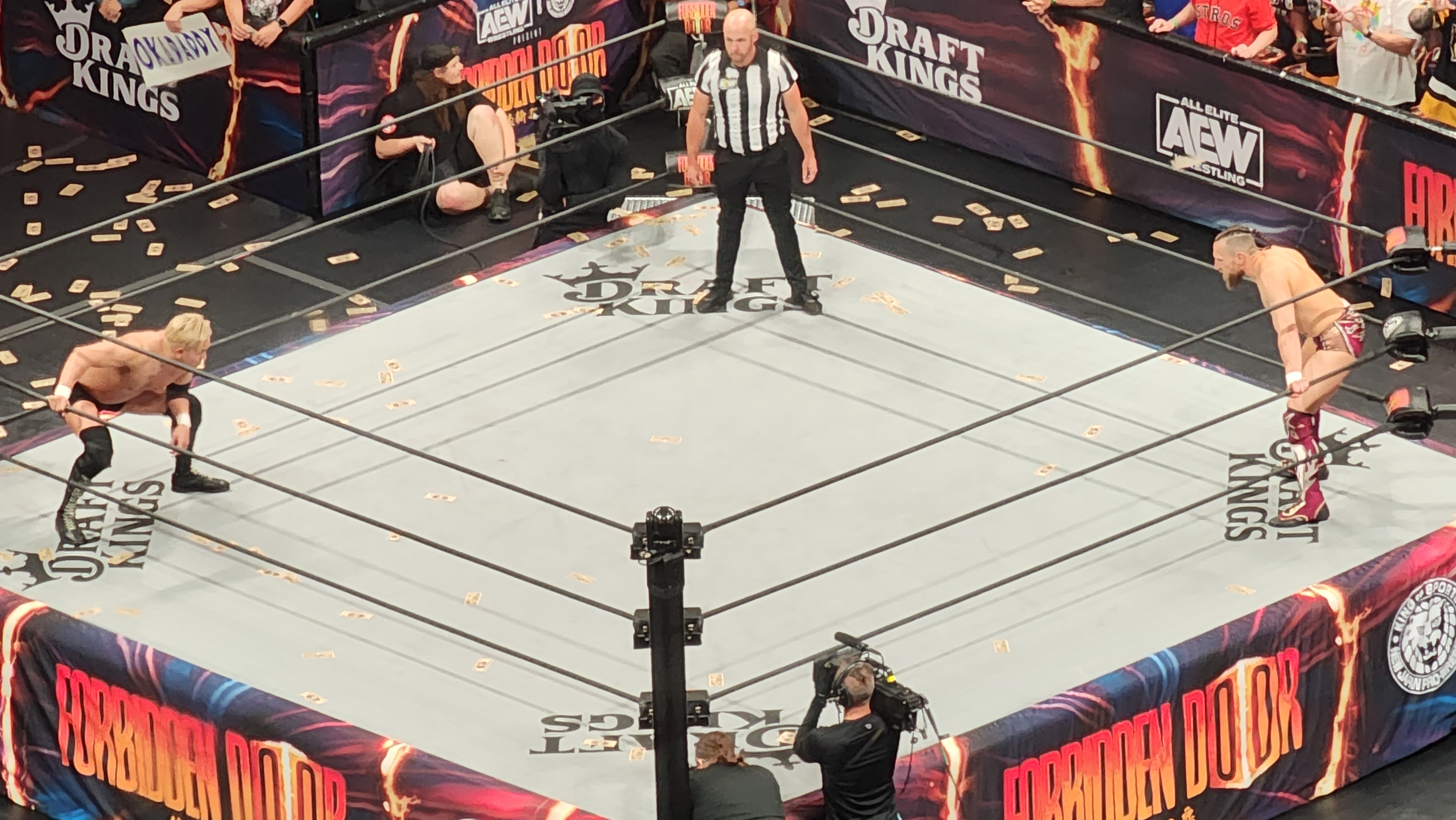
Okada (left) facing off against Bryan Danielson (right) at Forbidden Door in June 2023

Due to NJPW's working relationship with All Elite Wrestling (AEW), Okada made some appearances in AEW. He made his debut on the June 22, 2022 episode of AEW Dynamite, coming to the aid of Adam Page while he was being attacked by Jay White and Adam Cole. He would have his first match at Forbidden Door, where he lost to Jay White in a four-way match for the IWGP World Heavyweight Championship, also including Cole and Page. On the June 21, 2023 episode of Dynamite, Okada made his return to AEW to confront Bryan Danielson ahead of their match at Forbidden Door. At the event on June 25, Okada lost to Danielson via submission.

==== The Elite (2024–2025) ====
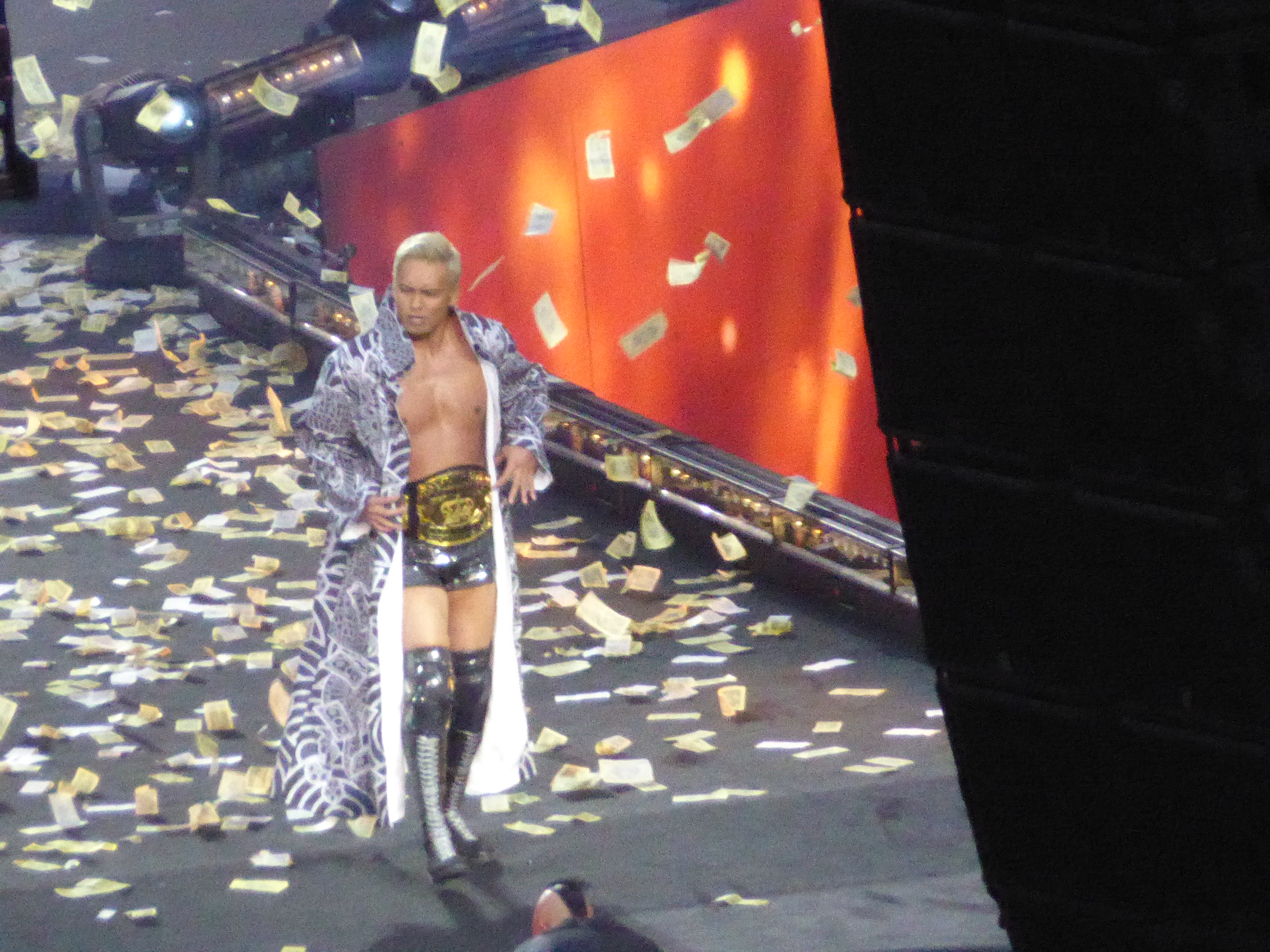
Okada making his entrance at All In in August 2024

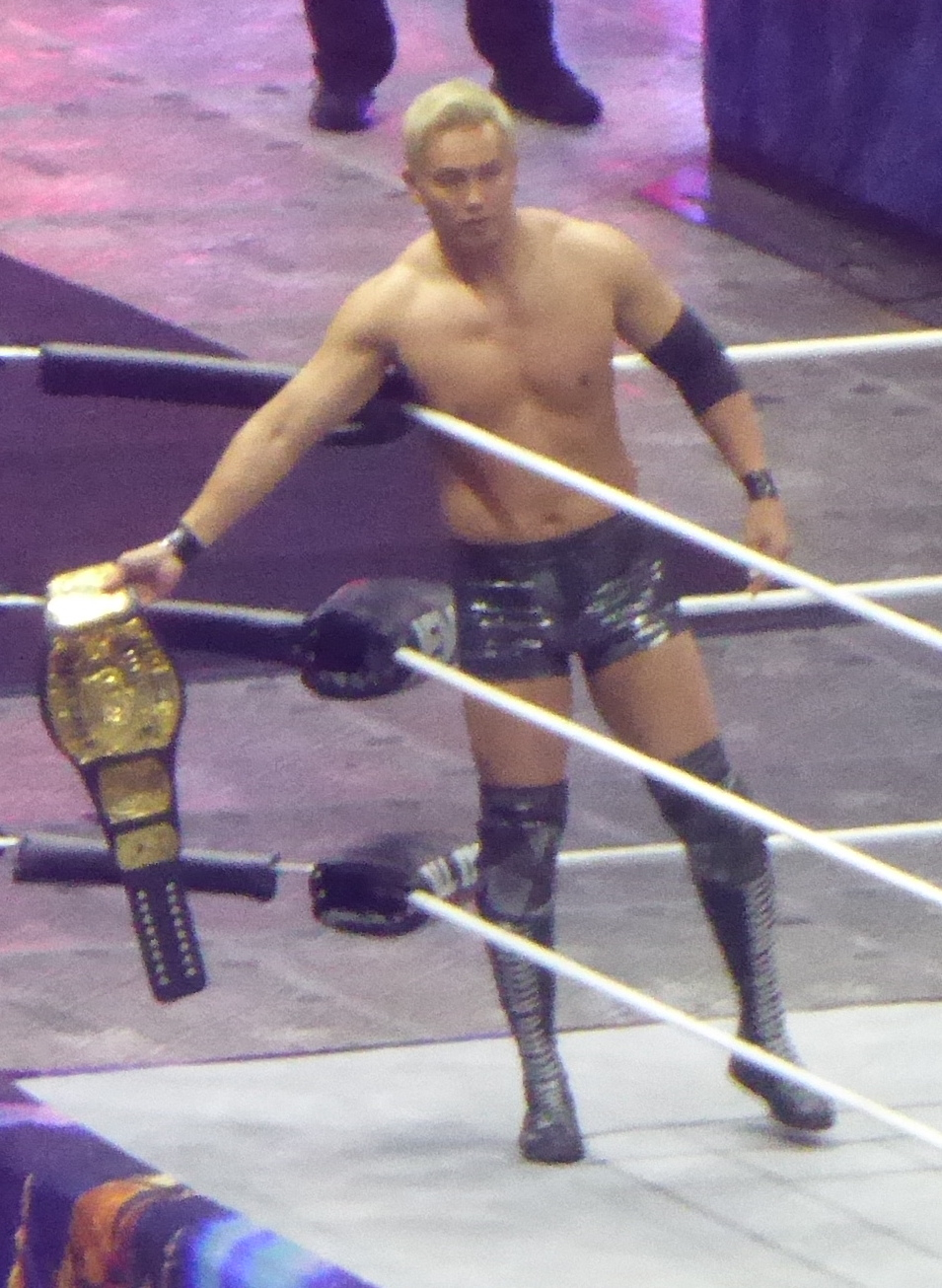
Okada holding the AEW Continental Championship in August 2024

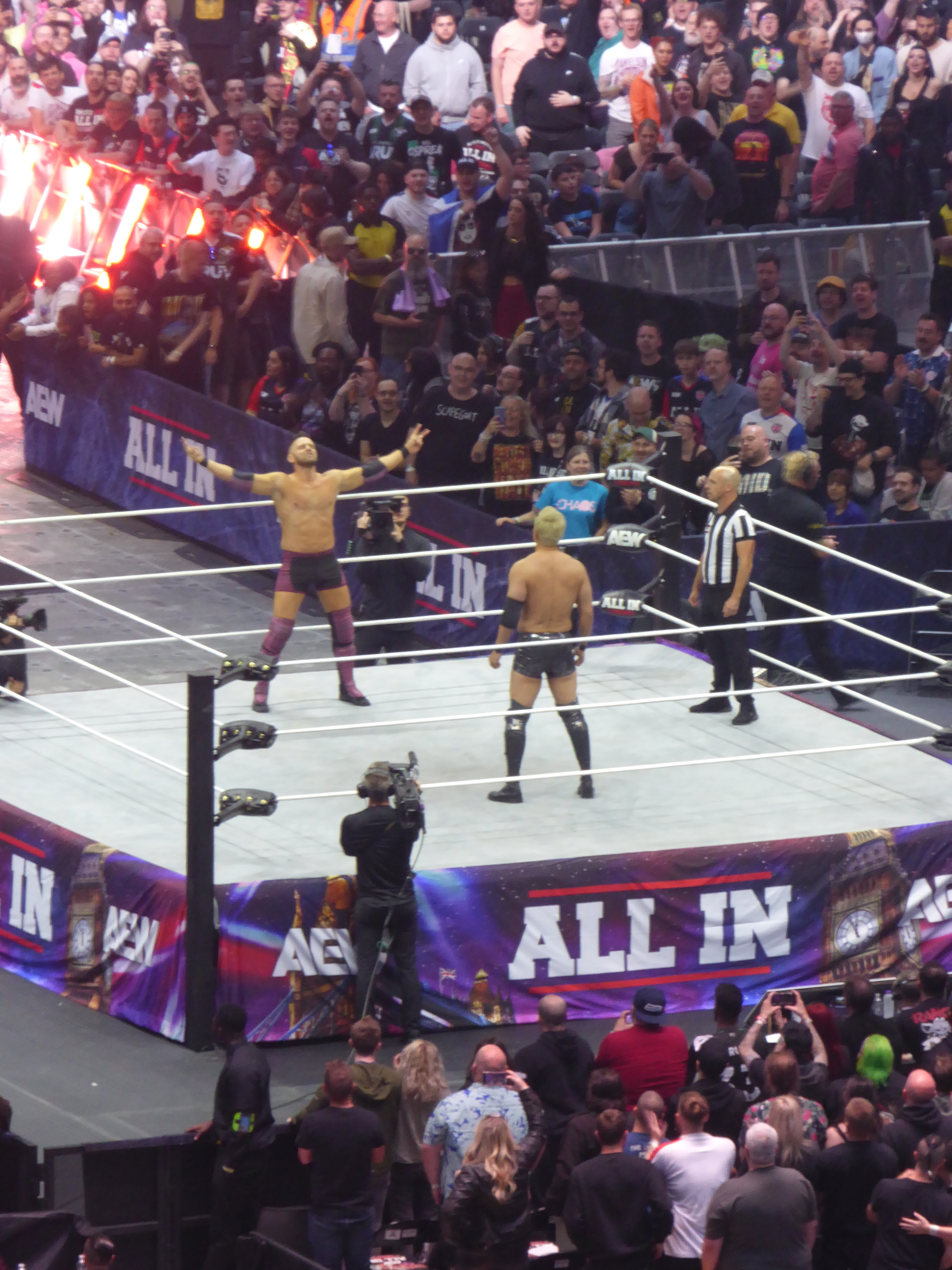
Okada face to face with Nigel McGuinness in August 2024

On the March 6, 2024 episode of Dynamite, Okada returned to AEW, now as a signed talent, turning heel and joining The Elite when he attacked Eddie Kingston, siding with the Young Bucks. On the March 20 episode of Dynamite, Okada defeated Kingston to win the AEW Continental Championship. On April 21 at Dynasty, Okada successfully defended his title in his first title defense against Pac. On the April 24 episode of Dynamite, Okada and the rest of The Elite (now including Jack Perry) attacked AEW President and CEO Tony Khan. At Double or Nothing on May 26, The Elite defeated Team AEW (Bryan Danielson, Darby Allin, and FTR (Cash Wheeler and Dax Harwood)) in an Anarchy in the Arena match. On July 24 at Blood & Guts, The Elite lost to Team AEW (Darby Allin, Mark Briscoe, Swerve Strickland, and The Acclaimed (Anthony Bowens and Max Caster)) in a Blood and Guts match. At All In on August 25, Okada was unsuccessful at winning the Casino Gauntlet, which was won by Christian Cage. On September 7 at All Out, Okada successfully defended the Continental Championship in a four-way match against Mark Briscoe, Orange Cassidy and Konosuke Takeshita. On October 2 of the 5th anniversary show of Dynamite, Okada unsuccessfully challenged Bryan Danielson for the AEW World Championship, suffering his first singles loss as an AEW talent. As Continental Champion, Okada was an automatic participant in the 2024 Continental Classic, where he was placed in the Blue league. Okada finished the tournament with 10 points and advanced to the playoff stage on December 30 at Worlds End. At Worlds End, Okada defeated Ricochet in the semi-finals and Will Ospreay in the grand finals, winning the 2024 Continental Classic and retaining his Continential Championship. After defeating Ospreay, Okada was confronted by his long-time rival Kenny Omega, who made his return after a lengthy hiatus due to a recovering from diverticulitis.

On February 15, 2025 at Grand Slam Australia, Okada successfully defended his title against Buddy Matthews. On March 9 at Revolution, Okada successfully defended his title against Matthews' Hounds of Hell stablemate Brody King. On May 25 at Double or Nothing, Okada successfully defended his title against "Speedball" Mike Bailey.

==== Don Callis Family (2025–present) ====
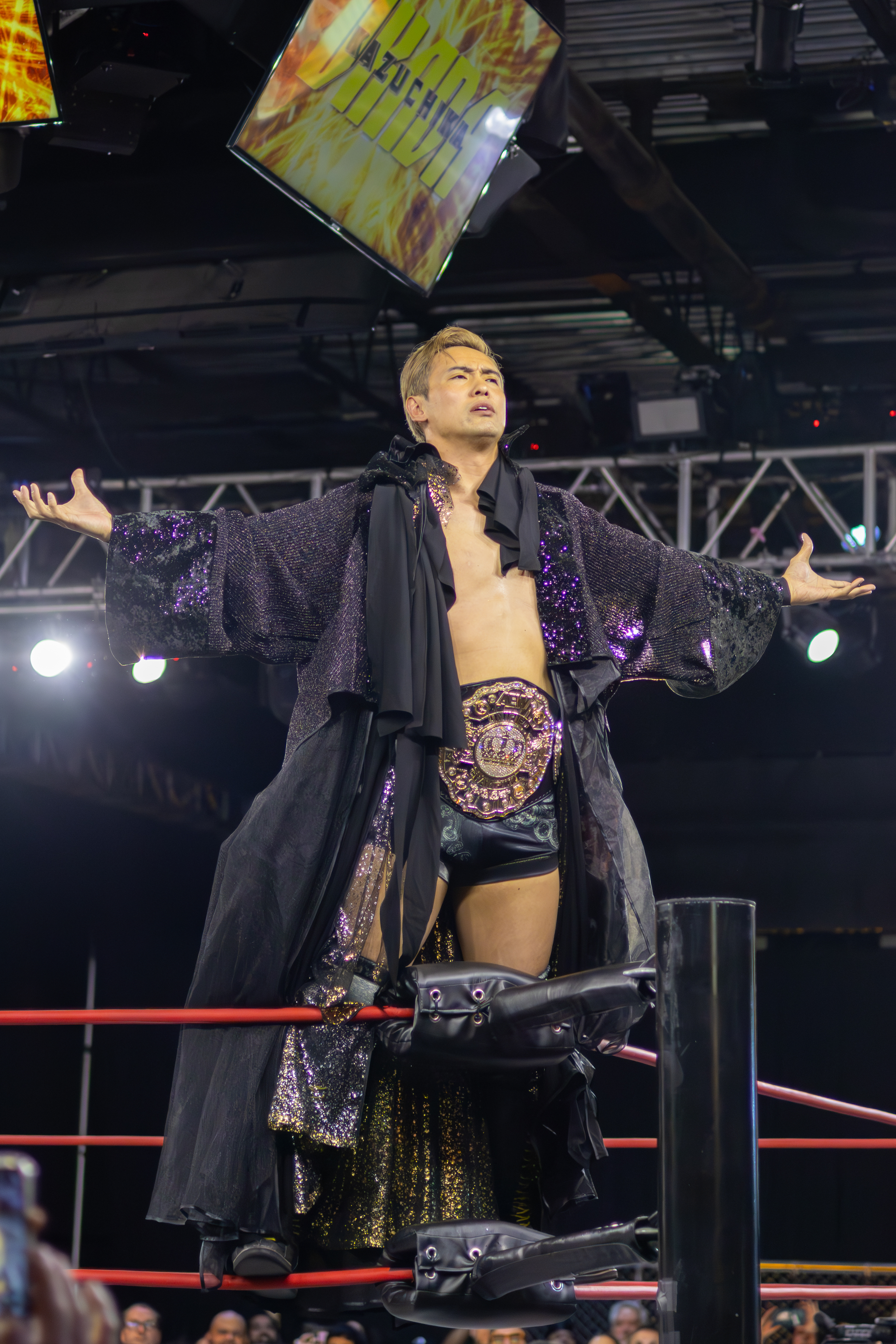
Okada as the AEW Unified Champion in September 2025

At Fyter Fest on June 4, Okada confronted Omega after the latter had just successfully defended his AEW International Championship, leading to a Winner Takes All Championship Unification match at All In on July 12, where Okada defeated Omega to become the inaugural and AEW Unified Champion, while also retaining his Continential Championship and winning the International Championship. During the feud, Okada aligned with Don Callis and joined the Don Callis Family, leaving The Elite in the process. On August 11, Okada became the longest-reigning champion in AEW's history at 509 days as Continential Champion, surpassing Jade Cargill's 508-day reign as AEW TBS Champion. Despite holding all three titles, Okada would primarily defend the Unified Championship. On August 24 at Forbidden Door, Okada successfully defended his title against Swerve Strickland. On September 20 at All Out, Okada successfully defended his title against Máscara Dorada and Konosuke Takeshita in a three-way match. On October 7 at Dynamite: Title Tuesday, Okada and Takeshita defeated the reigning AEW World Tag Team Champions Brodido (Brody King and Bandido) in a "Double Jeopardy Eliminator" match to earn a shot at the titles at WrestleDream on October 18, but failed to win the titles at the event. At Full Gear on November 22, Okada, Hechicero and Takeshita failed to win the CMLL World Trios Championship from El Sky Team (Místico, Máscara Dorada, and Neón). Okada was once again an automatic participant in the 2025 Continental Classic, where he was placed in the Gold League. Okada finished the tournament second in his league with 9 points (losing the first place tiebreaker to Kyle Fletcher) and advanced to the semi-finals at Worlds End on December 27, where he defeated Konosuke Takeshita in the semi-finals but lost to Jon Moxley in the championship final, ending his record-setting reign as Continental Champion at 647 days and was also forced to vacate the Unified Championship, ending that reign at 168 days. AEW later retroactivley made the title inactive, with Okada being the title's only champion.

On the March 4, 2026 episode of Dynamite, Okada would become a double champion again, winning the AEW World Trios Championship with Kyle Fletcher and Mark Davis by defeating Jet Set Rodeo ("Hangman" Adam Page, "Speedball" Mike Bailey, and "The Jet" Kevin Knight). They would only hold the Trios title for 11 days, losing it to Místico and JetSpeed at Revolution on March 15. On April 12 at Dynasty, tensions continued to rise between Okada and Takeshita as the two teamed in a losing effort against The Young Bucks, where Takeshita allowed The Young Bucks to hit the Meltzer Driver on Okada to win the match. At Double or Nothing on May 24, Okada lost the International Championship to Takeshita, ending his reign at 316 days. Okada regained the title at All In on 30 August, defeating Takeshita and the champion Kyle Fletcher in a three-way match. On September 26 at All Out, Okada retaind his title against Tommaso Ciampa. In October, Okada challenged Will Ospreay for the AEW World Championship twice, but was unsuccessful both times: first at Grand Slam France on October 6, and then at WrestleDream on October 17 in a Clockwork Carnage match. On November 4, Okada and his stablemates competed in a Blood and Guts match at the namesake event, where they were victorious. At Full Gear on November 14, Okada successfully defended his title against Adam Copeland.

=== Return to NJPW (2025–2026) ===
On November 8, 2025, Okada made his surprise return to NJPW as a heel, flanked by Gedo, where he confronted Hiroshi Tanahashi and was confirmed to be Tanahashi's opponent in his retirement match at Wrestle Kingdom 20. At the event on January 4, 2026, he defeated Tanahashi, ending their 18-year rivalry.

== Other media ==
Along with fellow NJPW wrestler Shinsuke Nakamura, Okada is featured in the Japanese music video for Pharrell Williams' song Happy, released in May 2014. In 2015, Okada voiced a character in the World Trigger anime series. The following year, he voiced a character in another anime, Future Card Buddy Fight 100. Okada, along with fellow NJPW wrestlers Hiroshi Tanahashi, Hiroyoshi Tenzan, Satoshi Kojima, Tetsuya Naito and Toru Yano, appears as a member of the gang Justis in the 2016 video game Yakuza 6: The Song of Life. In January 2017, it was announced that the Tekken 7: Fated Retribution video game would feature Okada's in-ring costume as an alternate outfit for the character King. When equipped, King performs Okada's finishing maneuver, the Rainmaker, as his "Rage Art" move. The Okada-geared King was featured on the September 12, 2017 episode of WWE's 205 Live program. Okada also appears as a wrestler in the 2017 NJPW-licensed video game Fire Pro Wrestling World.

Okada played rhythm guitar on several tracks on The High Crusade's extended play Main Statement, which was released on January 20, 2020.

== Personal life ==
Okada was engaged to TV Asahi presenter Yoko Mori, whom he had been in a relationship with from 2013 to 2017. In August 2014, after his uncle and cousin had both been diagnosed with cancer, Okada established the "Rainmaker Kikin" ("Rainmaker Fund") to battle children's cancer. For every match Okada won, he pledged to donate ¥30,000 (the equivalent of US$277.20).

In April 2019, voice actress Suzuko Mimori announced her marriage to Okada. In May 2022, it was announced that the couple are expecting their first child. In August, they welcomed a son. In November 2024, the couple welcomed their second son.

Okada supports Premier League club Manchester City, having become a supporter after watching the All or Nothing documentary on Amazon Prime, chronicling their success. He also supports J1 League club FC Tokyo, and attended the club's 2023 squad launch as well as their match against Shonan Bellmare on 9 April 2023. He is also a fan of the New York Knicks.

== Filmography ==
=== Film ===
| Year | Title | Role | Notes |
|---|---|---|---|
| 2018 | My Dad is a Heel Wrestler | Dragon Joji | |

=== Television ===
| Year | Title | Role | Notes |
|---|---|---|---|
| 2009 | Atashinchi no Danshi | Goro | |
| 2015 | World Trigger | Himself | Voice |
| 2015 | Tamiou | Okada | |
| 2016 | Future Card Buddy Fight 100 | Himself | Voice |
| 2016–18 | 99.9 Criminal Lawyer | Himself | 2 episodes |

=== Video games ===
| Year | Title | Role | Notes |
|---|---|---|---|
| 2016 | Yakuza 6: The Song of Life | Okada | Fictionalized version of himself |
| 2017 | Yakuza Kiwami 2 | Okada | Fictionalized version of himself, likeness only |
| 2017 | Fire Pro Wrestling World | Himself | Likeness only |

== Championships and accomplishments ==
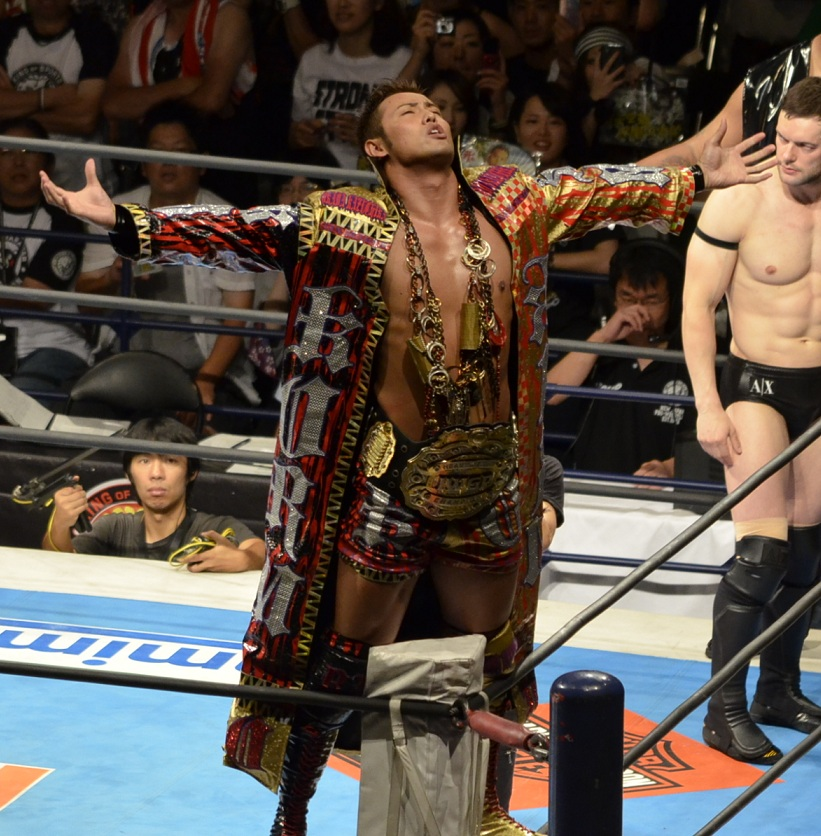
Okada is a seven-time IWGP Heavyweight Champion

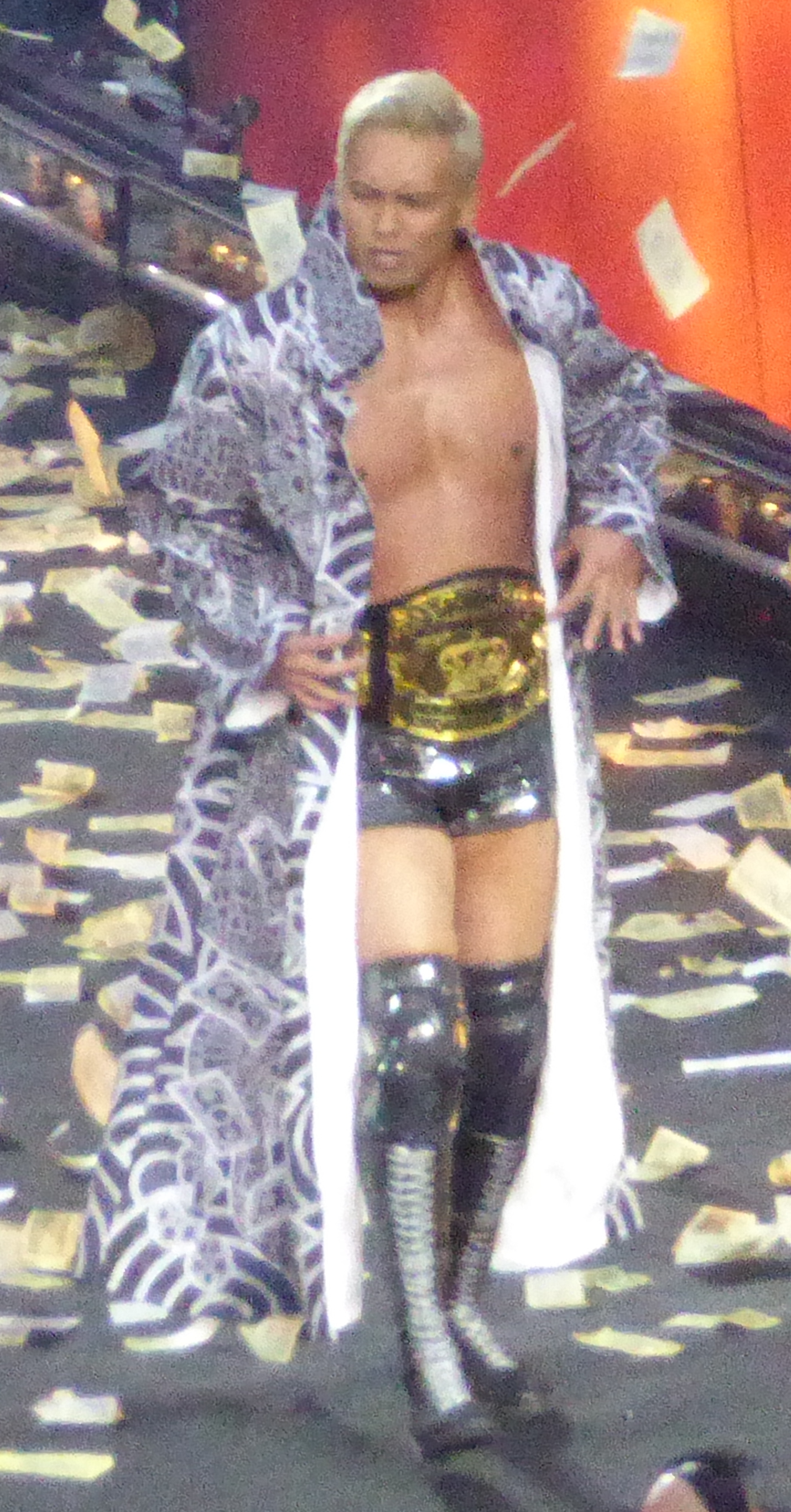
Okada is a one-time AEW Continental Champion

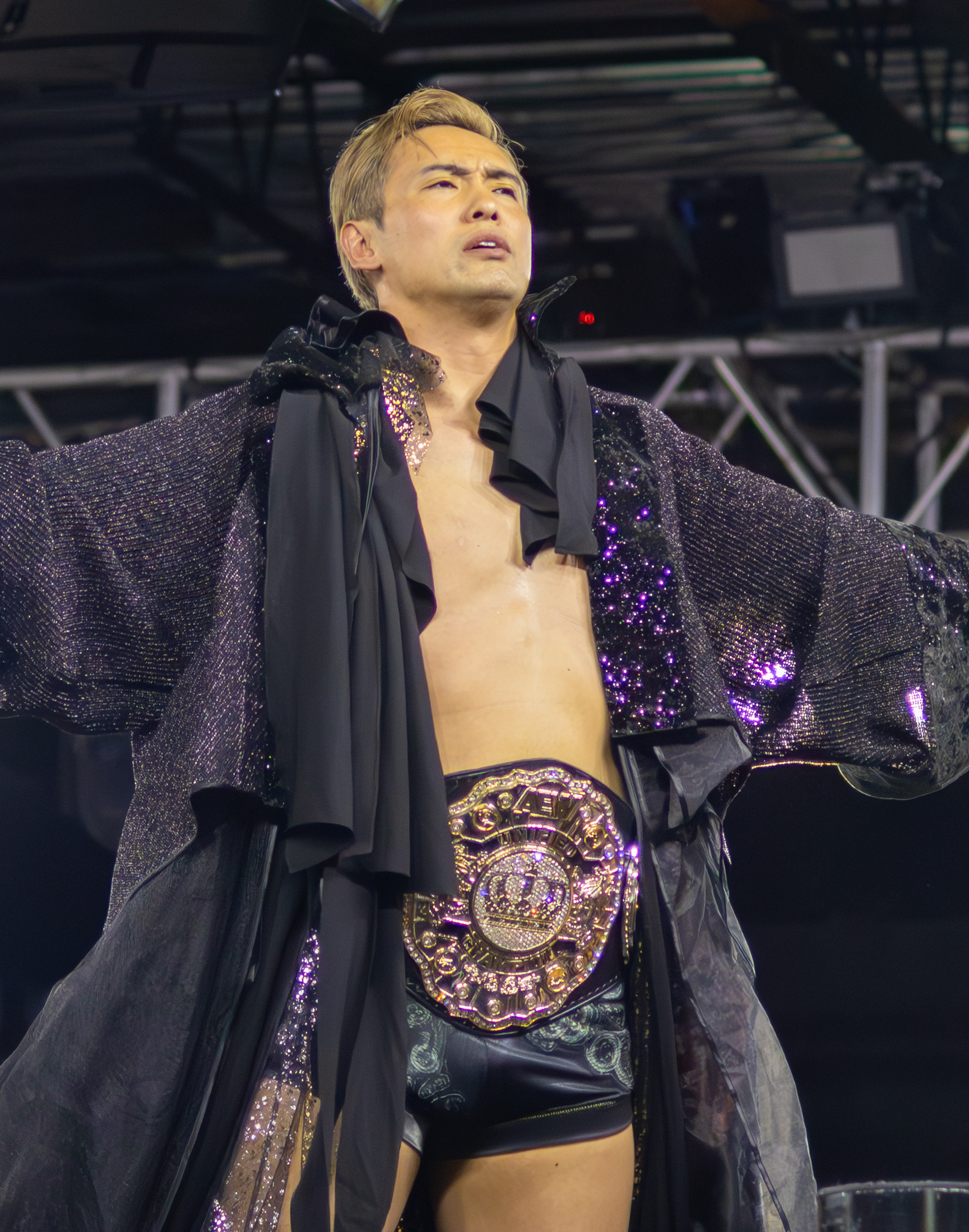
Okada is the inaugural AEW Unified Champion

- All Elite Wrestling
  - AEW Unified Championship (1 time, inaugural)
  - AEW International Championship (2 times, current)
  - AEW Continental Championship (1 time)
  - AEW World Trios Championship (1 time) – with Kyle Fletcher and Mark Davis
  - Continental Classic (2024)
- CBS Sports
  - Match of the Year (2018) vs. Kenny Omega at Dominion 6.9
- New Japan Pro-Wrestling
  - IWGP Heavyweight Championship (7 times) (Note: During Okada's sixth and seventh reigns, the title was called the IWGP World Heavyweight Championship.)
  - IWGP Intercontinental Championship (2 times) (Note: With the reactivation of the IWGP Heavyweight Championship and the restored and combined histories of both it, the World Heavyweight, and the Intercontinental titles, all former IWGP World Heavyweight Champions are retroactively recognized as having been an IWGP Intercontinental Champion.)
  - NEVER Openweight 6-Man Tag Team Championship (1 time) – with Hiroshi Tanahashi and Tomohiro Ishii
  - G1 Climax (2012, 2014, 2021, 2022)
  - New Japan Cup (2013, 2019)
  - Best Bout (2017) vs. Kenny Omega on June 11
- Nikkan Sports
  - MVP Award (2012, 2013, 2015, 2017)
  - Match of the Year Award (2012) vs. Hiroshi Tanahashi on February 12
  - Match of the Year Award (2014) vs. Shinsuke Nakamura on August 10
  - Match of the Year Award (2017) vs. Kenny Omega on January 4
  - Match of the Year Award (2018) vs. Kenny Omega on June 9
  - Outstanding Performance Award (2012)
- Pro Wrestling Illustrated
  - Ranked No. 1 of the top 500 singles wrestlers in the PWI 500 in 2017
  - Faction of the Year (2025) as part of the Don Callis Family
  - Feud of the Year (2017) vs. Kenny Omega
  - Match of the Year (2017) vs. Kenny Omega at Wrestle Kingdom 11
  - Match of the Year (2018) vs. Kenny Omega at Dominion 6.9 in Osaka-jo Hall
- Sports Illustrated
  - Ranked No. 4 of the top 10 male wrestlers in 2019 – tied with Seth Rollins
  - Ranked No. 6 of the top 10 wrestlers in 2017
- Tokyo Sports
  - Best Bout Award (2012) vs. Hiroshi Tanahashi on June 16
  - Best Bout Award (2014) vs. Shinsuke Nakamura on August 10
  - Best Bout Award (2015) vs. Genichiro Tenryu on November 15
  - Best Bout Award (2016) vs. Naomichi Marufuji on July 18
  - Best Bout Award (2017) vs. Kenny Omega on January 4
  - Best Bout Award (2018) vs. Kenny Omega on June 9
  - Best Bout Award (2019) vs. Sanada on October 14
  - Best Bout Award (2020) vs. Tetsuya Naito on January 5 at Wrestle Kingdom 14
  - Best Bout Award (2022) vs. Will Ospreay on August 18
  - MVP Award (2012, 2013, 2015, 2019, 2022)
- Toryumon Mexico
  - Young Dragons Cup (2005)
- Wrestling Observer Newsletter
  - Best Wrestling Maneuver (2012, 2013) Rainmaker
  - Feud of the Year (2012, 2013) vs. Hiroshi Tanahashi
  - Feud of the Year (2017) vs. Kenny Omega
  - Most Improved (2012)
  - Most Outstanding Wrestler (2017)
  - Pro Wrestling Match of the Year (2013) vs. Hiroshi Tanahashi on April 7
  - Pro Wrestling Match of the Year (2016) vs. Hiroshi Tanahashi on January 4
  - Pro Wrestling Match of the Year (2017) vs. Kenny Omega on January 4
  - Pro Wrestling Match of the Year (2018) vs. Kenny Omega on June 9
  - Pro Wrestling Match of the Year (2022) vs. Will Ospreay on August 18
  - Wrestler of the Year (2017)
  - Japan MVP (2019, 2022)
  - Most Outstanding Wrestler of the Decade (2010s)
  - Best Matches of the Decade (2010s)
  - Wrestling Observer Newsletter Hall of Fame (Class of 2021)
