= Bullet Club =

Professional wrestling stable

- The stable's logo

Stable
- Name: (The) Bullet Club (Note: Although NJPW does not, some promotions do occasionally use the definite article as part of the stable's name.)
- Leaders: Prince Devitt (I); AJ Styles (II); Kenny Omega (III); Jay White (IV); David Finlay (V)
- Members: See below
- Debut: May 3, 2013
- Disbanded: January 5, 2026
- Years active: 2013–2026

Bullet Club (バレットクラブ, Barettokurabu), stylized as BULLET CLUB and sometimes shortened to BC, was a professional wrestling stable primarily appearing in the Japanese promotion New Japan Pro-Wrestling (NJPW). In the United States, the group appeared on events run by the company's U.S. subsidiary, New Japan Pro-Wrestling of America, as well as U.S. partner promotions Total Nonstop Action Wrestling (TNA, formerly Impact Wrestling), All Elite Wrestling (AEW) and Ring of Honor (ROH). The group also previously appeared on events promoted by Tamashii, NJPW's Australasian affiliate, as well as on events of other Australasian independent promotions, on Consejo Mundial de Lucha Libre (CMLL) events in Mexico, and on Revolution Pro Wrestling (RevPro/RPW) and TNT Extreme Wrestling (TNT) events in the United Kingdom, as well as many other independent promotions around the world.

The group was formed in May 2013 when Irish wrestler Prince Devitt betrayed his Japanese partner Ryusuke Taguchi and came together with American wrestler Karl Anderson and Tongan wrestlers Bad Luck Fale and Tama Tonga to form a villainous stable of foreigners, which they subsequently named Bullet Club. Before the end of the year, the stable was also joined by three other Americans, The Young Bucks (Matt and Nick Jackson) and Doc Gallows. Wrestlers from the Mexican Consejo Mundial de Lucha Libre (CMLL) promotion have also worked tours of NJPW as members of Bullet Club, which led to the formation of an offshoot group named Bullet Club Latinoamerica in CMLL in October 2013. The stable marked a major turning point for the career of Devitt, a longtime fan favorite, who began his ascent out of the junior heavyweight division and into the IWGP Heavyweight Championship picture.

In April 2014, Devitt left NJPW and was replaced in Bullet Club by American wrestler AJ Styles. The following month, Styles captured the IWGP Heavyweight Championship. The stable continued adding members, most notably Canadian wrestler Kenny Omega, who became the group's third leader in early 2016 when Styles, Anderson and Gallows all left NJPW. After a "civil war" between The Elite and OG factions within the stable, Omega, Cody, Marty Scurll, Adam Page and The Young Bucks quietly left the faction in October 2018 to continue on their own as The Elite and to later form All Elite Wrestling (AEW) with New Zealand wrestler Jay White taking over as the fourth leader of the group. Due to COVID-19 pandemic travel restrictions in 2020, Evil becoming a temporary top representative member of the group in the Japan-based contingent of the group. In March 2023, David Finlay became the fifth leader of the group following Jay White's exit from NJPW. On January 5, 2026, David Finlay and Yota Tsuji announced the dissolution of the stable, officially merging both War Dogs and Unaffiliated into the new Unbound Co. stable.

During the 13 years of Bullet Club, the stable held every NJPW title, with a total of 75 title reigns, including 6 reigns with the IWGP Heavyweight Championship. Bullet Club members also won several NJPW tournaments, like Best of the Super Juniors, World Tag League, Super Jr. Tag Tournament, New Japan Cup and NJPW most prestigious tournament, the G1 Climax. Outside NJPW, Bullet Club also won championships in promotions like Impact Wrestling, All Elite Wrestling, Consejo Mundial de Lucha Libre or Ring of Honor. Several members also won awards from several publications like Wrestling Observer Newsletter or Tokyo Sports.

== Concept ==
Bullet Club was conceived by New Japan Pro-Wrestling (NJPW) in early 2013, following a positive fan response to a storyline, where Prince Devitt turned on his longtime tag team partner Ryusuke Taguchi to form a villainous partnership with Bad Luck Fale. Originally, Devitt and Fale were scheduled to go on as a duo, but the storyline was altered with them instead coming together with Karl Anderson and Tama Tonga to form an all-gaijin (foreigner) stable. Devitt came up with the name Bullet Club, which was in reference to his finger gun hand gesture and "Real Shooter" nickname and Anderson's nickname, "The Machine Gun". In naming the group, Devitt has stated that he specifically did not want the word "the" in front of the name or a name consisting of just three letters. Other names considered for the group included Bullet Parade, Bullet League and Bullet Brigade. As of May 2016, the Bullet Club trademark is owned by NJPW. Behind the scenes, the four founding members of Bullet Club were best friends and travel partners.

The group has been compared to the World Championship Wrestling (WCW) stable New World Order (nWo). As a way of paying homage to the nWo, members of Bullet Club began using the stable's signature "Too Sweet" hand gesture. The gesture, originally conceived by The Kliq's Sean Waltman and referred to by Kevin Nash as the "Turkish wolf", had supposedly been used by Anderson and Devitt behind the scenes since 2006. In March 2015, WWE filed a trademark application for the hand gesture. Some, including Matt and Nick Jackson, suggested this was done due to Bullet Club's popularity. The application was ultimately abandoned by WWE. In August 2015, after Devitt had joined WWE as Finn Bálor, WWE released Bálor Club merchandise playing off Bullet Club. WWE recognized Bullet Club in the first week of January 2016, when discussing rumors about members of the stable joining the promotion, preceding A.J. Styles' debut in the WWE as a 2016 Royal Rumble contestant. In April 2016, the former Bullet Club tag team of Gallows and Anderson debuted for WWE, with their NJPW background again being acknowledged by the company, eventually forming The Club with Styles. On September 25, 2017, Bullet Club appeared outside WWE's Raw show in Ontario, California, spoofing a segment from 1998 where D-Generation X "invaded" WCW's Nitro. Afterwards, WWE sent members of the stable a cease and desist letter, claiming they were using the company's intellectual property, specifically the Too Sweet hand gesture, leading to merchandise featuring the gesture being pulled from stores. WWE writer Jimmy Jacobs was let go by the company for posting a photo on Instagram with members of Bullet Club, taken during the mock invasion.

nWo's founding member Kevin Nash has praised Bullet Club as a more athletic version of the nWo, stating that there is mutual respect between the two stables, and informally passing the torch from his stable to Bullet Club. Jeff Jarrett, who has represented both Bullet Club and nWo, has named in-ring ability as the main difference between the two stables, stating "Bullet Club is off the charts bell to bell more talented". Former NJPW wrestler and current WWE trainer Matt Bloom has stated that Bullet Club's popularity helped the promotion become global.

Bullet Club's matches often involve excessive outside interference, ref bumps and other tactics, which are more common in American professional wrestling and are rarely seen in Japanese puroresu, even in matches involving other villainous acts. This disregard for Japanese traditions and culture got the stable over as a top act. Bullet Club has garnered a substantial amount of worldwide popularity, especially among American professional wrestling fans. As of March 2016, the stable's original Bone Soldier shirt was the top selling shirt on the Pro Wrestling Tees store, outselling all top independent wrestlers and WWE veterans that are affiliated with the site. In 2017, Bullet Club shirts were made available at Hot Topic stores, where they also became big sellers, supposedly selling 100,000 copies in the first three months. Bullet Club's popularity in the United States has led to members of the stable working as fan favorites at events held in the country.

As Bullet Club is owned by NJPW, all wrestlers joining the stable, including those who have joined at Ring of Honor (ROH) events, have to be approved by NJPW booker Gedo.

== History ==
=== Formation; Prince Devitt's leadership (2013–2014) ===
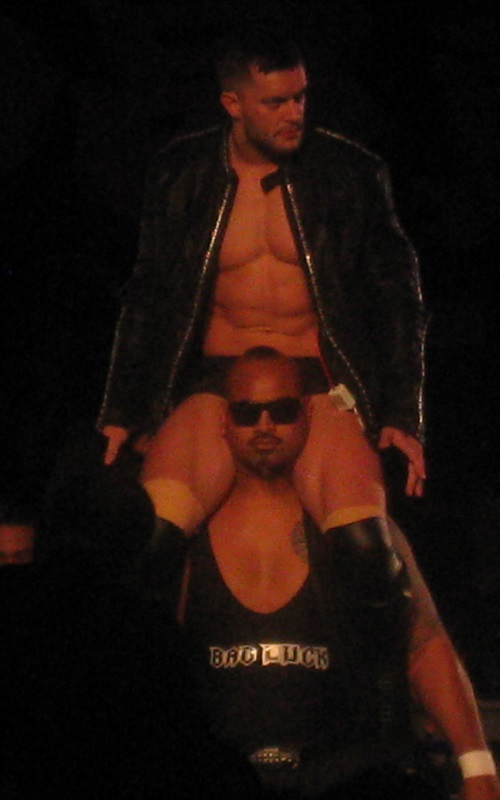
Prince Devitt, founder and the original leader of Bullet Club, on the shoulders of fellow founding member Bad Luck Fale

In 2013, IWGP Junior Heavyweight Champion Prince Devitt and member of the team Apollo 55 with Ryusuke Taguchi began portraying a more cocky and villainous persona, regularly disrespecting both partners and opponents. The stable was created at Invasion Attack pay-per-view, when Devitt and King Fale attacked Taguchi, and the Time Splitters (Alex Shelley and Kushida) and Captain New Japan. At the following pay-per-view, Wrestling Dontaku 2013 on May 3, Devitt and Fale teamed up for the first time to defeat Taguchi and Captain New Japan in a tag team match. They were joined by Karl Anderson and Tama Tonga.

Devitt won the 2013 Best of the Super Juniors tournament with a clean record of eight wins and zero losses, and moved to the heavyweight division, aiming to become the first wrestler to hold the IWGP Junior Heavyweight and IWGP Heavyweight Championships simultaneously. On June 22 at Dominion 6.22, Devitt defeated Tanahashi, to earn his first-ever shot at the IWGP Heavyweight Championship. The reigning champion, Kazuchika Okada, accepted Devitt's challenge for the title later in the event on the condition that he first defend the IWGP Junior Heavyweight Championship against his Chaos stablemate Gedo. Bullet Club's feud with Tanahashi continued at the July 5 Kizuna Road 2013 pay-per-view, where Tama Tonga and visiting Mexican wrestler Terrible lost the Consejo Mundial de Lucha Libre (CMLL) World Tag Team Championship to Tanahashi and Jyushin Thunder Liger. Terrible worked also the rest of his two-week NJPW tour as a member of Bullet Club. After successfully defending his IWGP Junior Heavyweight Championship against Gedo, Devitt received his match for the IWGP Heavyweight Championship on July 20, but was defeated by Okada, despite interference from the rest of Bullet Club. From August 1 to 11, both Devitt and Anderson took part in the 2013 G1 Climax, wrestling in separate round-robin blocks. During the tournament, Devitt picked up big wins, albeit through outside interference, over reigning IWGP Heavyweight Champion Kazuchika Okada and former champions Hiroshi Tanahashi, Satoshi Kojima and Togi Makabe, but failed to advance from his block. Meanwhile, Anderson entered the final day with a chance to reach the finals, but a loss against Tetsuya Naito eliminated him from the tournament. On September 5, Rey Bucanero, another CMLL wrestler, started a NJPW tour working as a member of Bullet Club. On September 14, the rest of Bullet Club helped Bucanero and Tama Tonga defeat Hiroshi Tanahashi and Jyushin Thunder Liger for the CMLL World Tag Team Championship. The rivalry between Devitt and Tanahashi culminated in a Lumberjack Deathmatch on September 29 at Destruction, where Tanahashi was victorious.

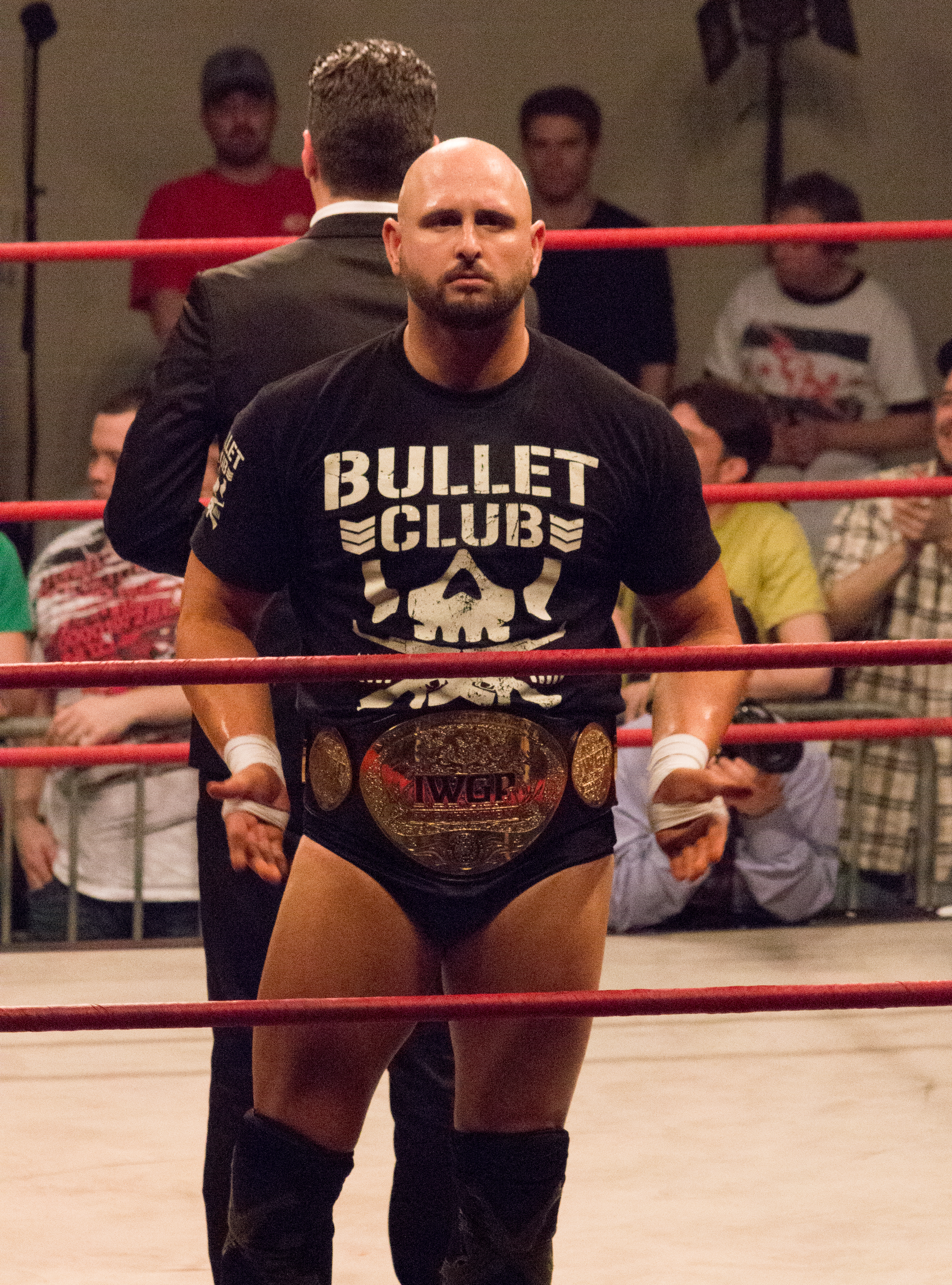
Karl Anderson, founding member and mouthpiece of Bullet Club as one half of the IWGP Tag Team Champions

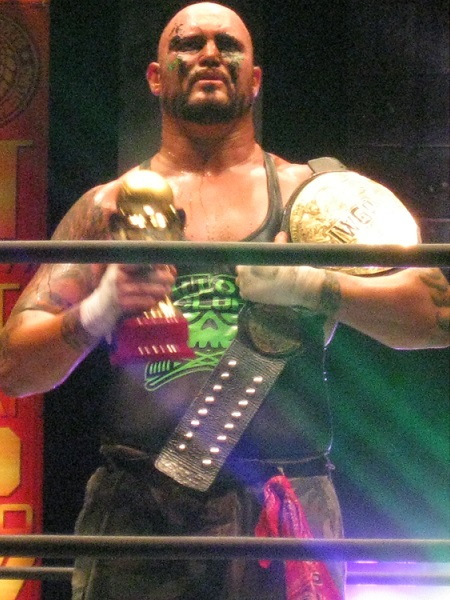
and his partner Doc Gallows, the other half of the championship pair

On October 11, Tonga and Bucanero returned to CMLL, where they formed "Bullet Club Latinoamerica" with CMLL World Heavyweight Champion Terrible and female wrestler and manager La Comandante. However, a week later, Tonga and Bucanero were stripped of the CMLL World Tag Team Championship, when they were unable to defend the title against La Máscara and Rush due to Bucanero being sidelined with an injury. On October 25, American tag team The Young Bucks (Matt Jackson and Nick Jackson) made their NJPW debut as the newest members of Bullet Club by entering the 2013 Super Jr. Tag Tournament. In early November, The Young Bucks defeated the Forever Hooligans (Alex Koslov and Rocky Romero) in the finals to win the tournament, later defeating Suzuki-gun (Taichi and Taka Michinoku) to become the new IWGP Junior Heavyweight Tag Team Champions. On November 11, NJPW announced the participating teams in the 2013 World Tag League. In the tournament, Bullet Club would be represented by two teams in separate blocks; Devitt and Fale in block A and Anderson and the debuting American Doc Gallows in block B. On December 7, both teams entered the final day of the round-robin portion of the tournament with a chance to advance to the semifinals. Anderson and Gallows won their block with a record of four wins and two losses by defeating NWA World Tag Team Champions The IronGodz (Jax Dane and Rob Conway), while Devitt and Fale were eliminated with a record of three wins and three losses, after losing to Captain New Japan and Hiroshi Tanahashi, who had lost all their other matches in the tournament. The following day, Anderson and Gallows first defeated Togi Makabe and Tomoaki Honma in the semifinals and then Hiroyoshi Tenzan and Satoshi Kojima in the finals to win the tournament. This led to a match on January 4, 2014, at Wrestle Kingdom 8, where they defeated K.E.S. (Davey Boy Smith Jr. and Lance Archer) to win the IWGP Tag Team Championship. During the same event, Devitt lost the IWGP Junior Heavyweight Championship to Kota Ibushi, ending his fourteen-month reign.

February's The New Beginning tour featured Bullet Club defending both of their tag team championships and the re-ignition of a rivalry between Devitt and his former partner Ryusuke Taguchi, who returned from an eight-month injury break. Devitt dominated his encounters with Taguchi for most of the tour, including pinning him in his return eight-man tag team match on February 2, but at the tour ending event, The New Beginning in Osaka, Taguchi pinned his former partner in a tag team match, where he teamed with Togi Makabe and Devitt with Fale. On March 8, 2014, at Raising the Bar: Night 2 The Young Bucks defeated reDRagon to win the ROH World Tag Team Championship, and with their Junior Tag Team Titles they became double champions. In March, Bad Luck Fale made it to the finals of the 2014 New Japan Cup, but was defeated there by Shinsuke Nakamura. As the one-year anniversary of the break-up of Apollo 55 approached, the rivalry between Devitt and Taguchi escalated, leading to Taguchi challenging his rival to a Loser Leaves Town match. However, the stipulation was never made official for their Invasion Attack 2014 match on April 6. During the match, Devitt got into an argument with The Young Bucks, after the two repeatedly interfered in the match despite his orders not to do so. This led to The Young Bucks turning on Devitt, who responded by diving onto his Bullet Club stablemates. After Taguchi defeated Devitt, the two men shook hands, ending their rivalry with each other and Devitt's association with Bullet Club. Devitt's resignation from NJPW was announced the following day.

=== A.J. Styles's leadership (2014–2016) ===
==== 2014 ====
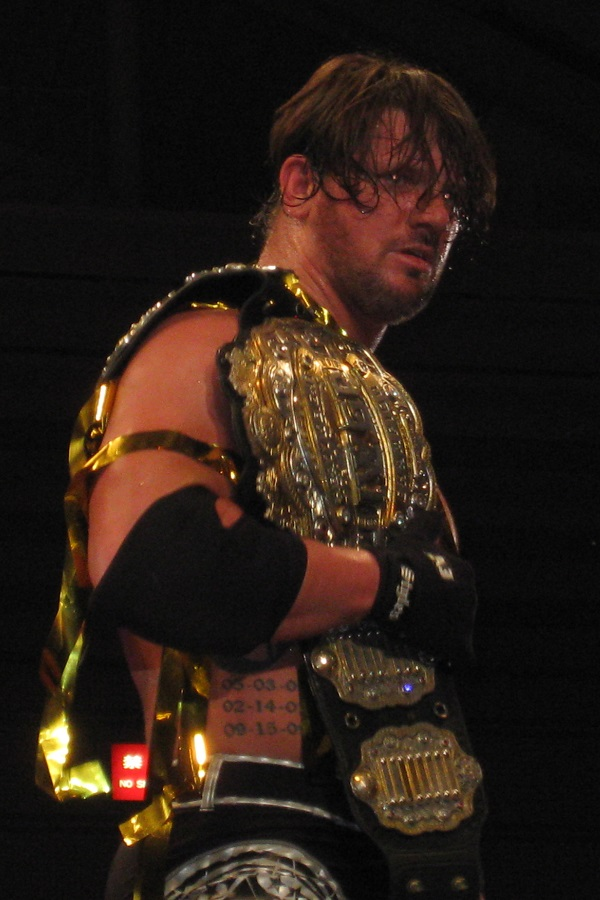
A.J. Styles, who joined the group in April 2014 and brought the IWGP Heavyweight Championship the following month. He is recognized by NJPW as the second leader, despite him not claiming the title himself.

Later at Invasion Attack 2014, American wrestler A.J. Styles debuted as the newest member of Bullet Club, attacking IWGP Heavyweight Champion Kazuchika Okada. On May 3 at Wrestling Dontaku 2014, Styles defeated Okada to become the new IWGP Heavyweight Champion, when Yujiro Takahashi turned on Okada and the Chaos stable and jumped to Bullet Club, becoming its first Japanese member. With Bullet Club capturing NJPW's top title, while also holding both of its tag team titles, and adding new members, this was billed as a "rebirth" for the stable, which was celebrating its one-year anniversary during the event.

Later in the month, Bullet Club took part in NJPW's North American tour, produced in collaboration with ROH. The Young Bucks, who entered the tour as both the IWGP Junior Heavyweight and ROH World Tag Team Champions, lost the latter title to reDRagon (Bobby Fish and Kyle O'Reilly) on May 17, ending their two-month reign in their first defense. Meanwhile, their seven-month reign as the IWGP Junior Heavyweight Tag Team Champions ended on June 21 at Dominion 6.21, where they were defeated by the Time Splitters in their sixth defense. During the following months, the stable won more championships when Fale defeated Shinsuke Nakamura to become the new IWGP Intercontinental Champion and Takahashi defeated Tomohiro Ishii to win the NEVER Openweight Championship. With the win, Bullet Club had won every title in NJPW, now simultaneously holding all four of its heavyweight titles.

From July 21 to August 8, five members of Bullet Club took part in the 2014 G1 Climax, but all five failed to advance from their blocks. On August 10, Jeff Jarrett and Scott D'Amore joined the group. On September 21 at Destruction in Kobe, Fale lost the IWGP Intercontinental Championship back to Shinsuke Nakamura in his first defense. Bullet Club lost their two remaining singles titles on October 13 at King of Pro-Wrestling with Takahashi losing the NEVER Openweight Championship back to Tomohiro Ishii in his second title defense, while in the main event Styles lost the IWGP Heavyweight Championship to Hiroshi Tanahashi in his third defense, after Jeff Jarrett's outside interference was stopped by the returning Yoshitatsu (Jarrett would leave the faction shortly after).

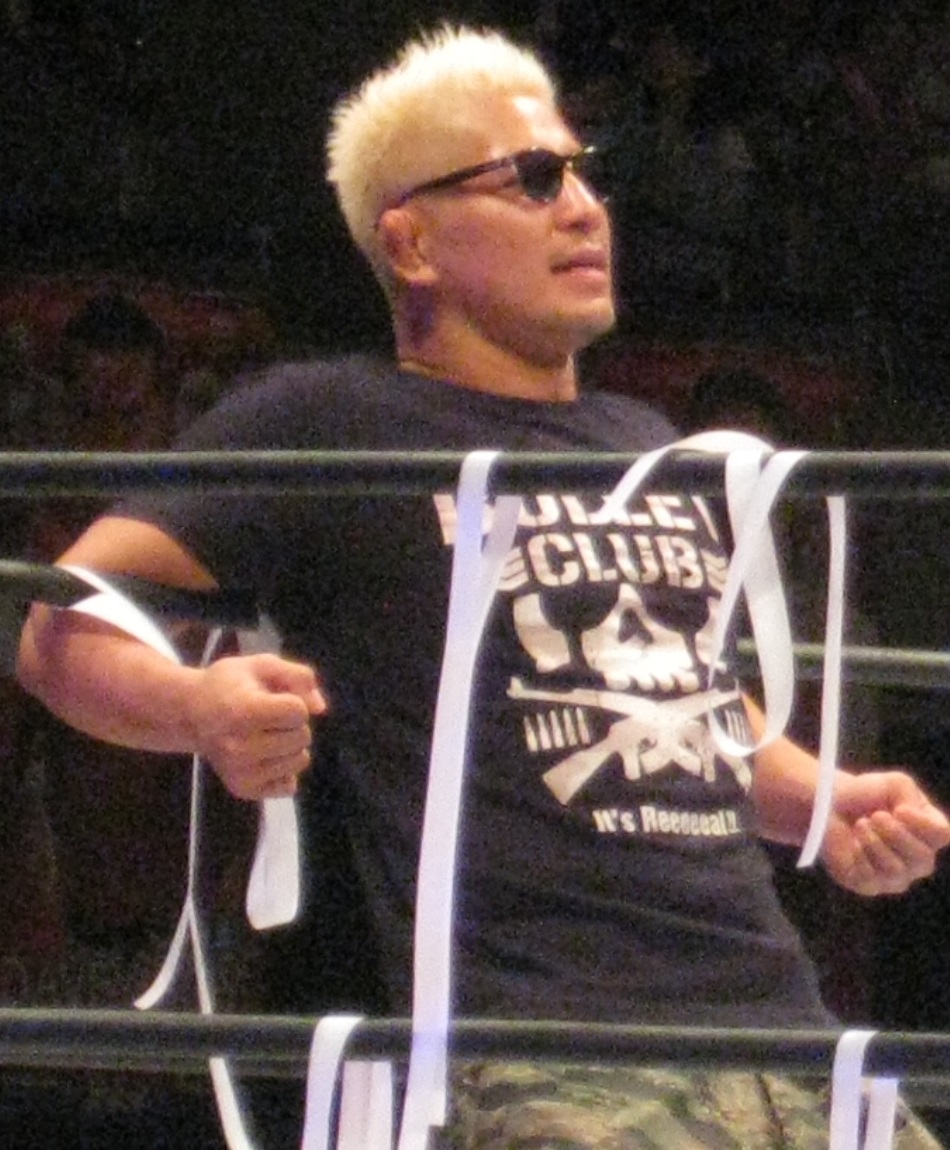
Yujiro Takahashi, Bullet Club's first Japanese member

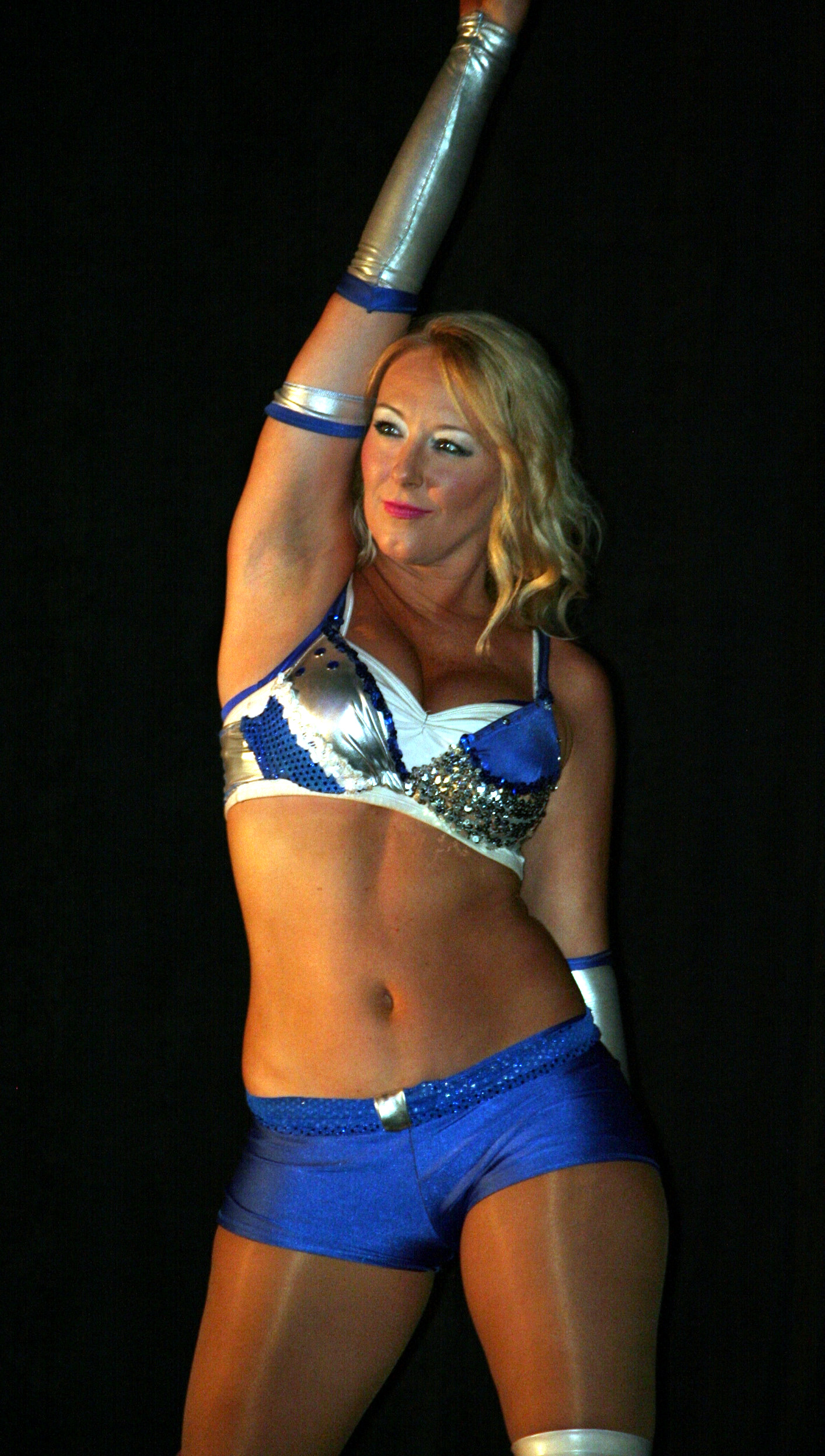
The "Bullet Babe" Amber O'Neal/Gallows, Gallows's then wife/valet, Second Woman to join overall, and the first/only woman that brought a Women's World title to the stable (NWA World Women's Championship)

On November 8 at Power Struggle, Kenny Omega, who had joined NJPW at the beginning of the month, became the newest member of Bullet Club, challenging Ryusuke Taguchi to a match for the IWGP Junior Heavyweight Championship. Omega had earlier dismissed the idea of joining Bullet Club as he did not consider himself a gaijin after six years of living in Japan, but now claimed he had lied and only wanted money and the title. Refusing to speak Japanese despite being fluent in the language, Omega dubbed himself "The Cleaner" with the idea of him being there to "clean up" the junior heavyweight division. From November 22 to December 5, three Bullet Club teams took part in the 2014 World Tag League; Anderson and Gallows and Styles and Takahashi in block A and Fale and Tonga in block B. Anderson and Gallows won their block with a record of five wins and two losses, while Styles and Takahashi finished close behind with four wins and three losses. Styles and Takahashi were victorious over the reigning IWGP Tag Team Champions in the head-to-head match between the Bullet Club teams, but were left behind them in the final standings due to losing to Okada and Yoshi-Hashi on the final day. Meanwhile, Fale and Tonga finished at the bottom of their block with a record of three wins and four losses. On December 5 at Shine Wrestling's Shine 23, Amber O'Neal joined the group when she was confronted by her former tag team partner Santana Garrett who made her return and stopped O'Neal's attacked on her schedule opponent Luscious Latasha, with O'Neal explaining her actions and new attitude to Garrett, that she only knew Amber O'Neal and proceed to renamed herself by her marriage name as Amber Gallows, "The Bullet Babe". She challenged Garrett for a match later on the event, which she lost in quick fashion and took all the anger on everyone around her. December 7, Anderson and Gallows were defeated in the finals of the tournament by Hirooki Goto and Katsuyori Shibata.

==== 2015 ====
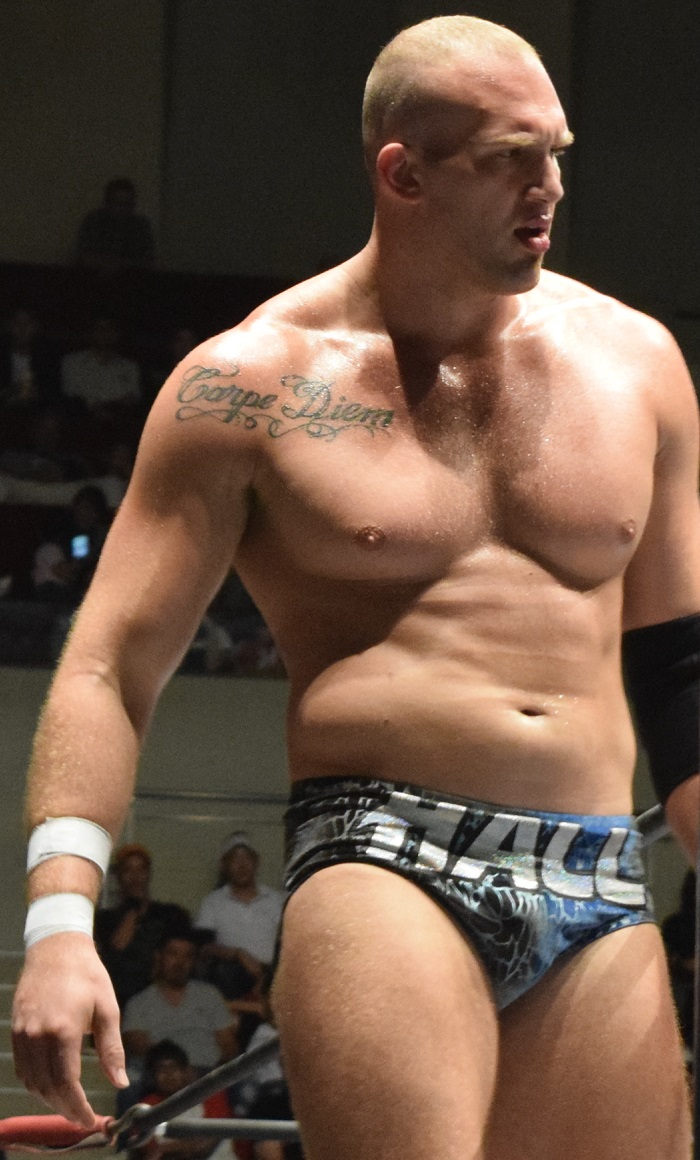
Cody Hall, the first "young boy" brought in as a personal understudy of Bullet Club

On January 4, 2015, at Wrestle Kingdom 9, Omega, in his first match as a member of Bullet Club, defeated Ryusuke Taguchi to become the new IWGP Junior Heavyweight Champion, while Anderson and Gallows lost the IWGP Tag Team Championship to Goto and Shibata, ending their year-long reign in their seventh defense. The following day, Cody Hall, the son of nWo founding member Scott Hall, joined Bullet Club as the stable's personal "young boy" with Anderson stating that he would have to earn his spot as a full-fledged member. Later that month, NJPW relaunched Bullet Club Latin-American in time for the Fantastica Mania 2015 tour, co-produced by NJPW and CMLL. On January 18, during the fifth day of Fantastica Mania 2015, CMLL wrestler Mephisto joined Bullet Club, prior to successfully defending his Mexican National Light Heavyweight Championship against Stuka Jr. On February 11 at The New Beginning in Osaka, The Young Bucks regained the IWGP Junior Heavyweight Tag Team Championship by defeating defending champions reDRagon and Time Splitters in a three-way match. Later that same event, Anderson and Gallows regained the IWGP Tag Team Championship from Goto and Shibata, while in the main event A.J. Styles defeated Hiroshi Tanahashi to also bring the IWGP Heavyweight Championship back to Bullet Club. Both of Bullet Club's tag team championship reigns ended in their first title defenses on April 5 at Invasion Attack 2015 with The Young Bucks being defeated by Roppongi Vice (Beretta and Rocky Romero) and Anderson and Gallows by the ROH tag team The Kingdom (Matt Taven and Michael Bennett).

The Young Bucks regained the title on May 3 at Wrestling Dontaku 2015 in a three-way match with Roppongi Vice and reDRagon. Also during the event, Bullet Club was involved in the first NJPW match to feature female wrestlers in over twelve years, where Karl Anderson, Doc Gallows and his wife Amber Gallows were defeated by Maria Kanellis, Matt Taven and Michael Bennett in a six-person intergender tag team match. On July 5 at Dominion 7.5 in Osaka-jo Hall, Kenny Omega lost the IWGP Junior Heavyweight Championship to the 2015 Best of the Super Juniors winner Kushida in his fourth defense, while Anderson and Gallows defeated Bennett and Taven in a rematch to win the IWGP Tag Team Championship for the third time. In the main event, Styles lost the IWGP Heavyweight Championship to Kazuchika Okada in his second defense. From July 20 to August 15, five members of Bullet Club took part in the 2015 G1 Climax with Fale, Gallows and Styles in block A and Anderson and Takahashi in block B. Both Styles and Anderson entered their last round-robin matches with a chance to advance to the finals, but were eliminated after losing to Hiroshi Tanahashi and Satoshi Kojima, respectively. On August 16, The Young Bucks lost the IWGP Junior Heavyweight Tag Team Championship to reDRagon in their second defense. From September 4 to 6, Styles and The Young Bucks represented Bullet Club in American promotion Chikara's 2015 King of Trios tournament, where they made it to the finals, before losing to Team AAA (Aero Star, Drago and Fénix). On September 23 at Destruction in Okayama, Omega defeated Kushida, following outside interference from Anderson, to regain the IWGP Junior Heavyweight Championship. On October 23, Chase Owens became the newest member of Bullet Club.

=== Kenny Omega's leadership (2016–2018) ===
==== 2016 ====
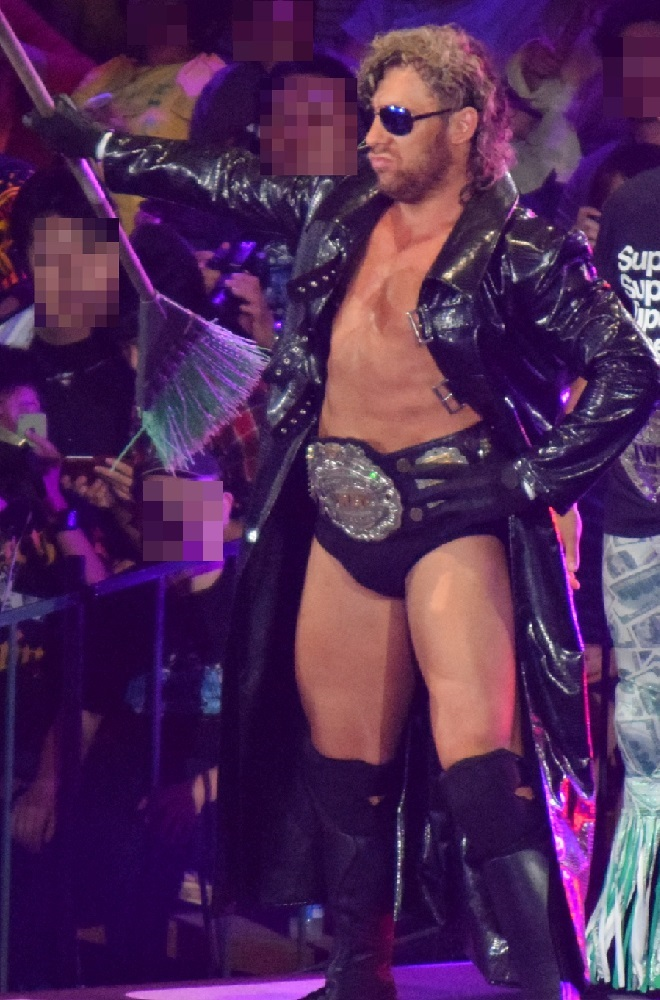
Kenny Omega, who took over as the third leader of Bullet Club in January 2016

On January 4, 2016, at Wrestle Kingdom 10, The Young Bucks regained the IWGP Junior Heavyweight Tag Team Championship, Omega lost the IWGP Junior Heavyweight Championship back and Anderson and Gallows lost the IWGP Tag Team Championship. In Bullet Club's final title match of the event, Styles unsuccessfully challenged Shinsuke Nakamura for the IWGP Intercontinental Championship. Hours after the event, it was reported that Anderson, Gallows, and Styles had all given their notice to NJPW and would be leaving the promotion for WWE. The following day, the rest of Bullet Club turned on Styles and kicked him out of the group with Omega taking over the leadership. Omega also announced his graduation from the junior heavyweight division, stating that he did not want a rematch with Kushida, but instead a match with Nakamura for the IWGP Intercontinental Championship.

==== Formation of The Elite ====
In the aftermath of Omega taking over Bullet Club's leadership, he and The Young Bucks formed their own subgroup within the stable, called The Elite. Omega and The Young Bucks came up with the idea for The Elite themselves, feeling the need to create something new after being forced by NJPW into Bullet Club and what Omega called a "Too Sweet", "Suck it" parody of the nWo. Omega stated that he and The Young Bucks were The Elite, but accepted if NJPW continued calling them Bullet Club "in parentheses" as the stable was their "cash cow". He explained the name change by stating that following Anderson, Gallows and Styles' departures from NJPW, "Bullet Club [was not] so much the Bullet Club anymore". Omega later added his opinion that Anderson, Gallows and Styles' departures had "watered down" Bullet Club's ranks, which is why he wanted to push The Elite to the forefront, claiming that when people said that "Bullet Club [had] been doing some really cool stuff", they always meant him and The Young Bucks and not the other members of the group.

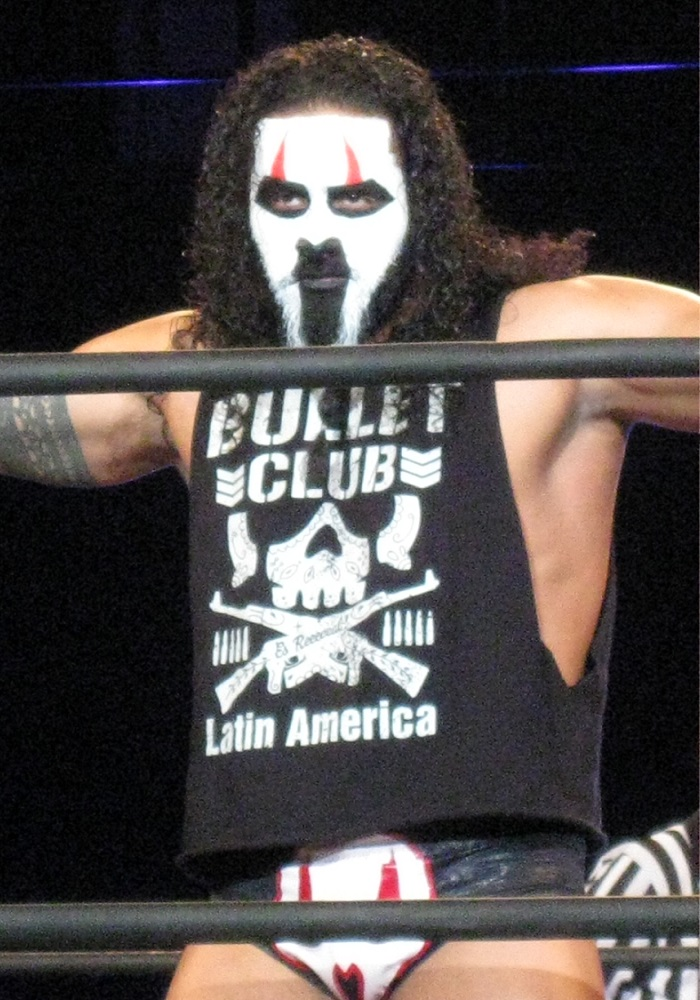
Tama Tonga, one of the four founding members of Bullet Club

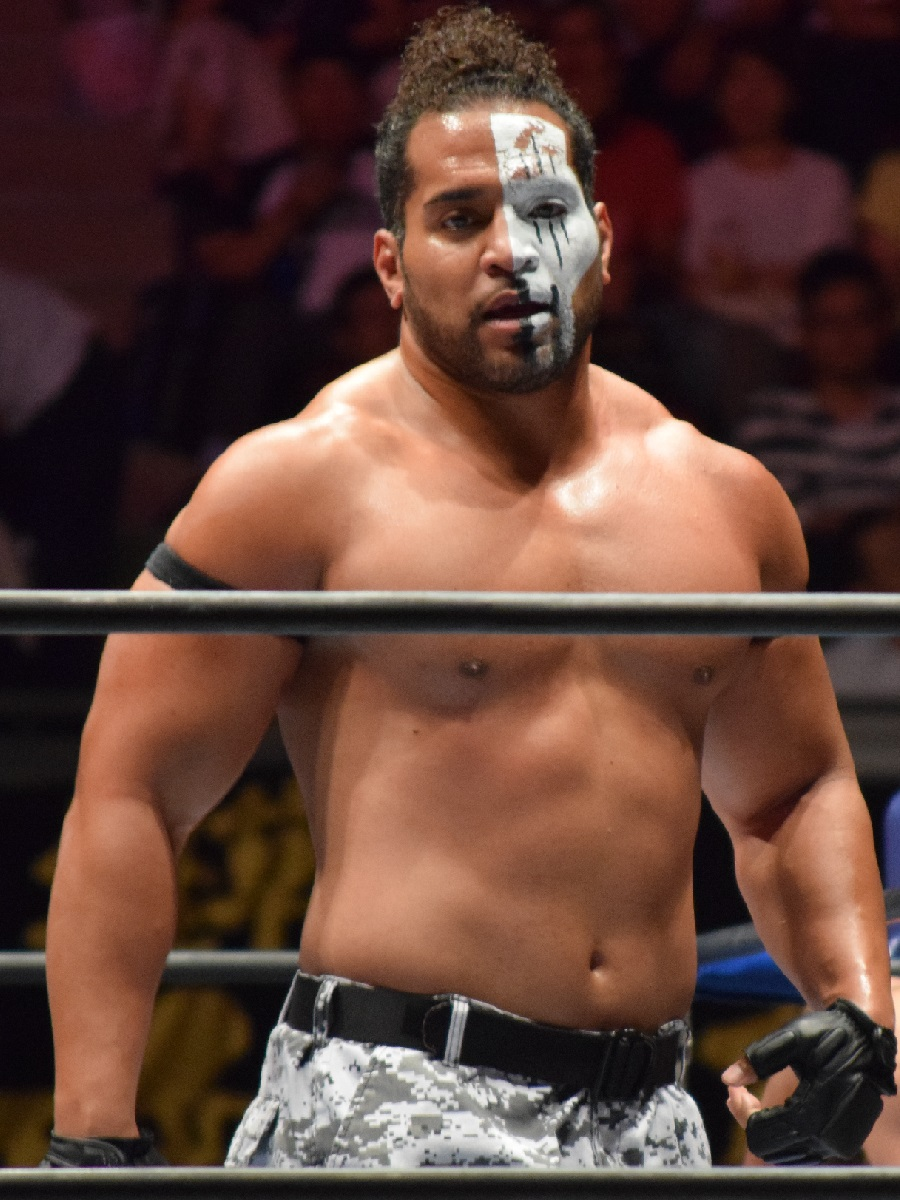
Tanga Loa, who was brought in to form the Guerrillas of Destiny tag team alongside Tonga

During 2016, Gallows and Anderson also left NJPW after signing a contract with WWE, with their final match in NJPW taking place at Honor Rising: Japan in an eight-man tag team match where Bullet Club lost. However, on March 12, Tonga revealed that his partner for the upcoming IWGP Tag Team Championship match and the newest member of Bullet Club was his real-life brother Tevita Fifita, who was two days later given the ring name "Tanga Loa", with the tag team between him and Tonga dubbed "Guerrillas of Destiny" (GOD). In ROH, Anderson, Gallows, and Styles left the stable in a more peaceful goodbye, compared to their more violent NJPW departure, where the stable kicked them out by beating them up. Also, ROH wrestlers Adam Cole and Adam Page joined the stable in May. Cole went on to form another Bullet Club sub-group with The Young Bucks, named "Superkliq". In NJPW, Page was given the ring name "Hangman Page", which he eventually also began using in ROH.

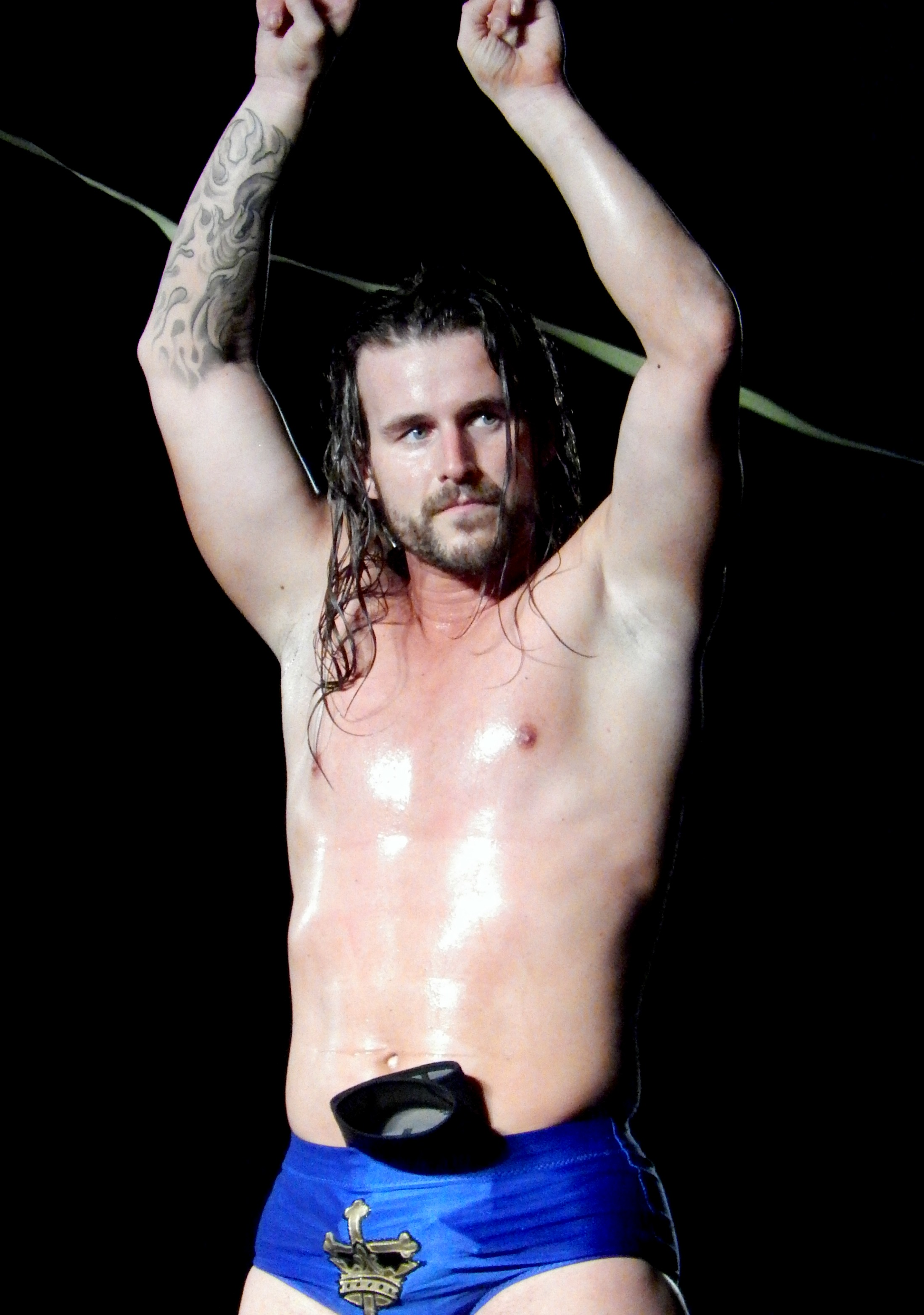
Adam Cole, who brought the Ring of Honor (ROH) World Championship to the stable

Before summer, several members of the Bullet Club won titles, like the Young Bucks winning the IWGP Jr. Tag team Titles, Guerrillas of Destiny winning the IWGP Tag Team Titles and Omega winning the Intercontinental title. However, the biggest accomplishment was Omega winning the 2016 G1 Climax, becoming the third wrestler to win the tournament in his first attempt as well as the first non-Japanese wrestler in history to win the tournament. During the following month, Captain New Japan and Cody joined Bullet Club. Captain changed his character to "Bone Soldier". The name came from Bullet Club's original shirt, which featured a character named Bone Soldier. In addition, the term had previously also been used as a nickname for members of Bullet Club. Also, The Young Bucks won the ROH World Tag Team Championship for the second time and Guerrillas of Destiny regained the IWGP Tag Team Championship, but Adam Cole lost the ROH World Championship.

On January 4, 2017, at Wrestle Kingdom 11, The Young Bucks lost the IWGP Junior Heavyweight Tag Team Championship to Roppongi Vice. while the Guerrillas of Destiny lost the IWGP Tag Team Championship to Tomohiro Ishii and Toru Yano. In the main event of the show, Omega unsuccessfully challenged Kazuchika Okada for the IWGP Heavyweight Championship. Afterwards, Omega took a hiatus from NJPW to "reassess [his] future". Upon his return on February 26, a new storyline involving tension between Omega and Cole was started, with The Young Bucks caught in the middle. On February 11, Frankie Kazarian joined Bullet Club, turning on longtime tag team partner Christopher Daniels at a taping of Ring of Honor Wrestling. On March 4, The Young Bucks lost the ROH World Tag Team Championship to The Hardys (Matt and Jeff Hardy). On March 10 at ROH's 15th Anniversary Show, Kazarian turned on Adam Cole and Bullet Club, revealing his tenure was only a ruse to help Christopher Daniels become the new ROH World Champion. The following day, Cole, disappointed with The Young Bucks for not having his back, tried to fire them from Bullet Club, but the two responded by stating that he could not fire them as Omega, not Cole, was the leader of the stable. On May 12, Omega fired Cole from Bullet Club and gave his spot in the stable to ROH World Television Champion Marty Scurll. Two days later, on the final night of the tour, Scurll lost the ROH World Television Championship to Kushida, following a distraction from Cole.

In the months following Wrestle Kingdom 11, Omega looked for another shot at the IWGP Heavyweight Championship, but his plan of obtaining one through the 2017 New Japan Cup was derailed, when he was eliminated in his first round match by Tomohiro Ishii. After defeating Ishii in a rematch on May 3 at Wrestling Dontaku 2017, Omega was nominated by Kazuchika Okada for an IWGP Heavyweight Championship rematch at Dominion 6.11 in Osaka-jo Hall. On June 11 at Dominion 6.11 in Osaka-jo Hall, The Young Bucks defeated Roppongi Vice to win the IWGP Junior Heavyweight Tag Team Championship for the sixth time. In the main event of the show, Omega and Okada wrestled to a 60-minute time limit draw for the IWGP Heavyweight Championship. The match also started a storyline, where Omega and Cody began having problems with each other with Cody wanting to throw in the towel for Omega, insisting he was too badly injured. On June 23 at Best in the World, Cody defeated Christopher Daniels to bring the ROH World Championship back to Bullet Club. On July 1, during the first night of G1 Special in USA, Cody unsuccessfully challenged Okada for the IWGP Heavyweight Championship. During the match, Omega, playing off what had happened at Dominion, walked out, wanting to throw in the towel for Cody, which led to Cody confronting him after the show. The following day, Omega defeated Tomohiro Ishii in the finals of an eight-man tournament to become the inaugural IWGP United States Heavyweight Champion.

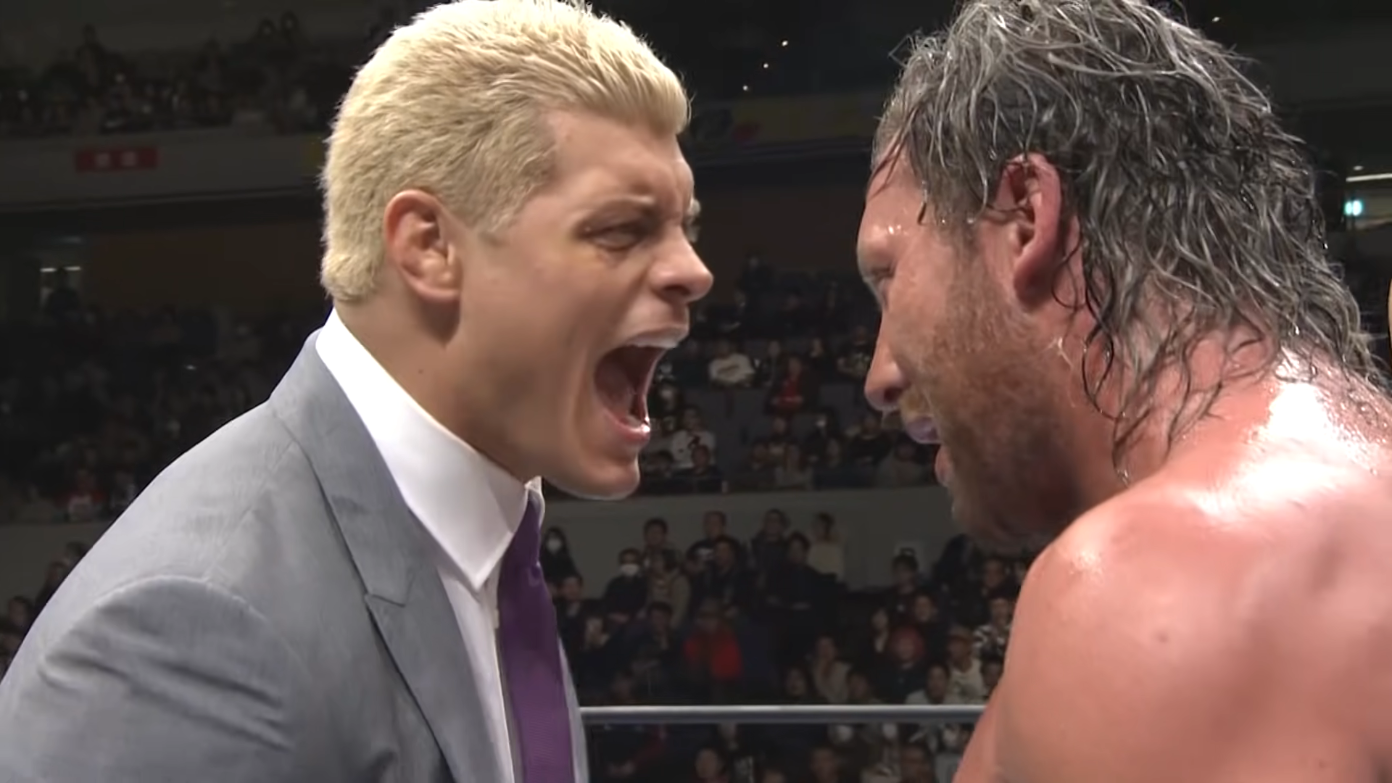
During their time together in NJPW, Cody and Omega consistently butted heads over control of the Bullet Club...

... eventually culminating in Cody attacking Omega at The New Beginning in Sapporo, leading to a "Civil War" within the group.

Later that month, three members of Bullet Club took part in the 2017 G1 Climax; Fale in block A and Omega and Tonga in block B. Omega won his block and advanced to the finals of the tournament with a record of seven wins and two losses by defeating IWGP Heavyweight Champion Okada in their third match against each other on August 12. During the head-to-head match between Omega and Tonga, which was won by the former, tensions escalated between the two with Tonga questioning Omega's leadership of Bullet Club due to his association with The Elite. On August 13, Omega was defeated in the finals of the 2017 G1 Climax by Tetsuya Naito. On September 6, it was announced that Tonga and Loa's youngest brother, NJPW young lion Leo Tonga, was joining Bullet Club, replacing Omega on an upcoming tour due to him having suffered a knee injury. On September 22 at Death Before Dishonor XV, The Young Bucks lost the ROH World Tag Team Championship to The Motor City Machine Guns. On November 5 at Power Struggle, Scurll defeated Will Ospreay to bring the IWGP Junior Heavyweight Championship back to Bullet Club. On November 11, Australian Wrestler Gino Gambino joined the group after being invited by Fale with a BC shirt after their tag match, and formed a tag team in Melbourne City Wrestling (MCW) with Gambino as "Bullet Club Down Under". Gambino primarily wrestled representing the group in the oceanian circuit most notably for MCW and in NJPW events in Australia. On November 17, actor Stephen Amell, who had befriended Cody when they worked together in WWE, joined Bullet Club, wrestling his first match as a member at ROH's show later that same day. The following month, Guerrillas of Destiny made it to their second consecutive World Tag League final by winning their block in the 2017 tournament with a record of five wins and two losses. On December 11, they were defeated in the finals of the tournament by Los Ingobernables de Japón (Evil and Sanada). Four days later at ROH's Final Battle, Cody lost the ROH World Championship to Dalton Castle. On December 17, Fale and Guerrillas of Destiny defeated Bushi, Evil and Sanada to become the new NEVER Openweight 6-Man Tag Team Champions.

On January 4, 2018, at Wrestle Kingdom 12, the Young Bucks defeated Roppongi 3K (Sho and Yoh) to regain the IWGP Junior Heavyweight Tag Team Championship. Also at the event, Fale and the Guerrillas of Destiny lost the NEVER Openweight 6-Man Tag Team Championship and Marty Scurll lost the IWGP Junior Heavyweight Championship back to Will Ospreay. The following night at New Year Dash!! 2018, Fale and the G.O.D. defeated Beretta, Ishii and Yano to win back the NEVER Openweight 6-Man Tag Team Championship, beginning 2018 with six members of Bullet Club holding championships in NJPW (the others being Omega and the Young Bucks with the IWGP United States Championship and the IWGP Jr. Tag Team Championships respectively). At the same event, Bullet Club, with Cody leading, attempted to attack Kota Ibushi with a chair following a 10-man tag match, but were stopped by Omega, teasing tension between the two men over the leadership of Bullet Club. On night two of The New Beginning in Sapporo, following Omega's loss of the IWGP United States Championship to Jay White, he was attacked by Cody and hit with the Cross Rhodes, continuing the infighting within the faction.

=== Bullet Club Civil War ===
The rivalry between Cody and Omega continued throughout February and March at both Ring Of Honor and NJPW events, beginning a series of matches pitting members of Bullet Club against each other in both tag and singles matches. During this time, Tongan members Tonga, Loa and Fale keep distance with the two factions, being known as Bullet Club OGs. Around this time, the tension within Bullet Club would be documented as the focus of the YouTube series Being The Elite. G.O.D. also began their own YouTube series following the members of Bullet Club who are stationed mainly in NJPW.

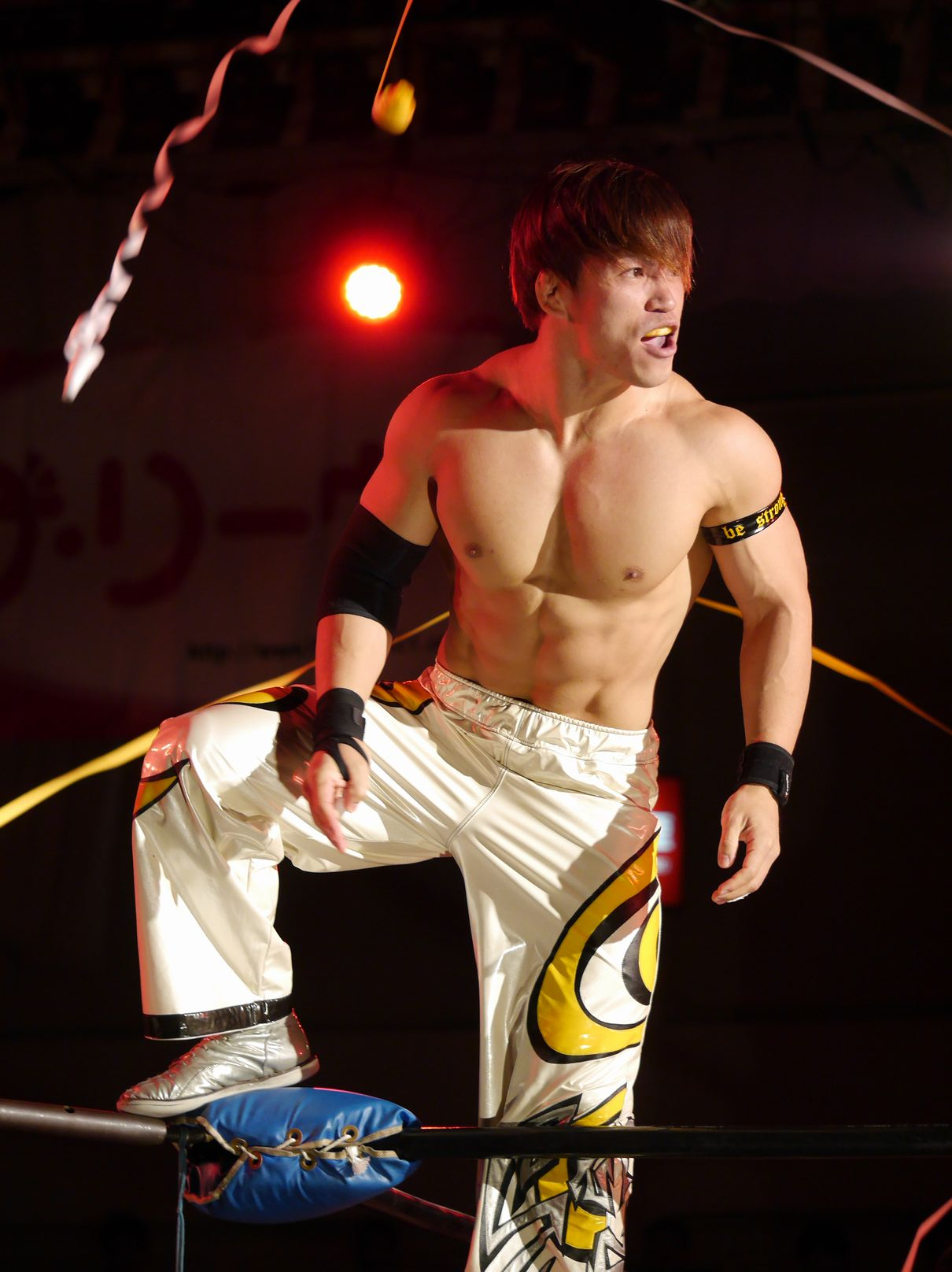
Taiji Ishimori, Bullet Club's third Japanese member

On April 7, Omega and Cody fought in a singles match at Supercard of Honor XII. During the match, the Young Bucks attempted to help Omega by superkicking Cody. However, this backfired when Cody moved out of the way, with the Bucks kicking Omega instead. Thanks to this, Cody was able to use the Cross Rhodes on Omega to win the match. Following the reunion of the Golden☆Lovers and despite not joining Bullet Club as a member, Ibushi would become a regular in Bullet Club tag matches. On May 3, the first night of Wrestling Dontaku 2018, the trio of the Young Bucks and Scurll defeated Fale and the G.O.D. to capture the NEVER Six-Man Tag Team Championship. During the second night of Wrestling Dontaku, Tama Tonga introduced the new "Bone Soldier", who attacked Ospreay and revealed himself to be Taiji Ishimori. Ishimori would go on to win Block A of the Best of the Super Juniors 2018 tournament, but ended up losing to Hiromu Takahashi in the finals.

On June 9 at Dominion 6.9 in Osaka-jo Hall, the Young Bucks defeated Evil and Sanada to win the IWGP Heavyweight Tag Team Championships for the first time, and Omega would defeat Kazuchika Okada 2 falls to 1 to win the IWGP Heavyweight Championship for the first time, ending Okada's reign as the longest champion in history at 720 days. After the match, Omega made peace with the Young Bucks in the ring, and would announce during the post match comments that Ibushi, the Young Bucks, and himself had the formed a new sub-group called The Golden Elite. The following day at a press conference aired on NJPW World, Omega confirmed that he and the Young Bucks were still a part of the Bullet Club, as well as clarifying that while Ibushi had joined The Elite, he was not a member of Bullet Club. Omega also claimed he was still the leader of Bullet Club, and announced that his first defense of the IWGP Heavyweight Championship would be against Cody at the G1 Special at the Cow Palace in San Francisco.

On July 7, at the G1 Special, Omega defeated Cody to retain the IWGP Heavyweight Title. After Omega's usual post-match address to the fans, he and The Young Bucks were joined by Tonga, Loa and King Haku. The Tongans appeared to be congratulating Omega, only to attack them soon after, revealing new "B.C. Firing Squad" T-shirts, as they did so. Page and Scurll both came to The Elite's defense by attacking the Tongans, before Yujiro Takahashi and Owens attempted to bring the conflict to a halt; the Tongans ultimately dismantled all four. Cody then came out and was offered a chance to attack Omega with a steel chair, only to go after the Tongans and be attacked as well. As the Tongans left, declaring themselves to be the true Bullet Club, Omega and Cody embraced, finally realigning and in effect restoring Omega's leadership of the group on their side. Fale and Hikuleo were shown to have aligned with the Bullet Club OG contingent in a video entitled "Don't Call it a Comeback" on G.O.D.'s official YouTube channel. During a livestream on Instagram on August 10, 2018, Tama Tonga confirmed that Ishimori is aligned with Bullet Club OG. On the final of the G1 Climax 28, the trio of Tama Tonga, Tanga Loa and Taiji Ishimori beat the trio of the Young Bucks and Marty Scurll for the NEVER Openweight Six-Man Championship. On October 8, 2018, at King of Pro-Wrestling, former Chaos members Jay White, Jado and Gedo joined Bullet Club. Australian wrestler Robbie Eagles was also announced as a new member as Ishimori's tag team partner in the Super Jr. Tag League. On October 24, 2018, Cody announced that he was no longer a member of the Bullet Club via his official Twitter account. On the Talk is Jericho podcast with Chris Jericho on October 30, Matt Jackson confirmed that he, Cody Rhodes, Kenny Omega, Marty Scurll, his brother Nick Jackson, and Adam Page are now called simply The Elite and that they are no longer part of the Bullet Club. All members except one (Scurll) left NJPW and ROH and became part of the brand-new promotion All Elite Wrestling.

=== Jay White's leadership (2018–2023) ===
==== 2018–2019 ====
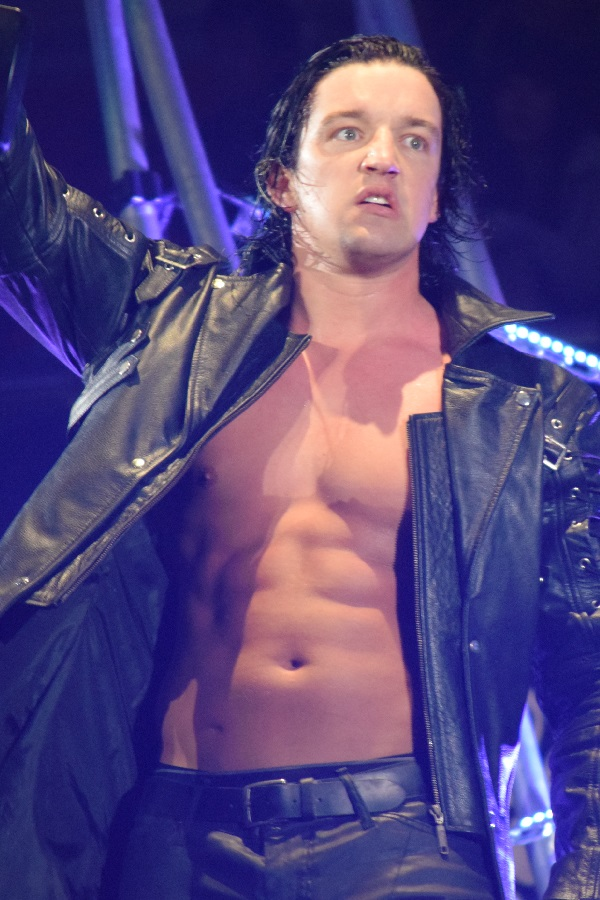
Jay White, who took over as the fourth leader of Bullet Club in December 2018. He was the longest-tenured Bullet Club leader.

At the end of 2018, Taiji Ishimori and Robbie Eagles ended the Super Jr. Tag League in a tie for 4th place with 3 wins and 4 losses for a total score of 6, while Tama Tonga and Tanga Loa lost in the finals of the World Tag League 2018 against Los Ingobernables de Japón (Evil and Sanada). Chase Owens and Yujiro Takahashi rejoined Bullet Club at New Year Dash. On December 22, Tama Tonga announced that White was the new leader of the Bullet Club. At Wrestle Kingdom 13, White defeated Okada in a singles match. Also, during the event Ishimori defeated Kushida to win the IWGP Jr. Heavyweight Title. At The New Beginning in Osaka, White defeated Hiroshi Tanahashi with a Blade Runner to win the IWGP Heavyweight Title. On February 23, Guerillas of Destiny would capture their fifth tag team heavyweight championship against EVIL and Sanada of Los Ingobernables de Japón at Honor Rising. On March 8, it was announced that El Phantasmo would be joining Bullet Club. On April 6, at G1 Supercard in Madison Square Garden the Guerrillas of Destiny retained their IWGP Heavyweight Tag Team Titles and won the ROH World Tag Team Titles from Villain Enterprises (Brody King and PCO) in a Winner take all Fatal 4 Way Match that also involved the Teams of Los Ingobernables de Japón (Evil and Sanada) and The Briscoe Brothers (Mark and Jay Briscoe). The same night however Taiji Ishimori lost the Jr. Heavyweight Title to Dragon Lee in a triple threat match that also involved Bandido and in the Main Event Jay White lost the IWGP Heavyweight Championship to Kazuchika Okada.

Ishimori, Phantasmo, and Eagles would all enter the Best of the Super Juniors tournament, with Ishimori ending with 14 points, Phantasmo ending with 12 points, and Eagles ending with 10 points. Ishimori and Phantasmo would defeat Roppongi 3K to win the Junior Heavyweight Tag Team Titles on June 16, 2019. On June 30, at Southern Showdown in Sydney, Australia, Robbie Eagles defected from Bullet Club after refusing to hit Will Ospreay with a chair at the request of White, Jado, and Bad Luck Fale. Eagles hit White with a superkick and helped Ospreay up to his feet, then aided Ospreay, Hiroshi Tanahashi, and Kazuchika Okada in fending off the Bullet Club members, following which they accepted him as an official member of CHAOS, completing his defection. On August 12, at the 2019 G1 Climax Final, Kenta turned on Tomohiro Ishii and Yoshi-Hashi in a match against Bad Luck Fale and the Guerillas of Destiny, aligning himself with Bullet Club. After the match, Kenta was attacked by Katsuyori Shibata for his betrayal, but Shibata was quickly overwhelmed by Bullet Club. In the main event, Kota Ibushi defeated White to win the 2019 G1 Climax. On August 25, 2019, El Phantasmo won the Super J-Cup when he defeated Dragon Lee. On August 31 at Royal Quest, NJPW's first independently promoted show in the United Kingdom, Kenta defeated Tomohiro Ishii for the NEVER Openweight Championship, thus winning his first championship in NJPW and bringing the title to Bullet Club. At the Destruction in Kobe event, White defeated Tetsuya Naito to win the IWGP Intercontinental Championship in the main event.

==== 2020 ====
At Wrestle Kingdom 14 (Jan 4–5), Bullet Club went on a losing streak at the event when they lost 6 of 7 of their matches at the event, Chaos (Goto, Ishii, Yano and Hashi) defeated Bullet Club's Kenta, Fale, Takahashi and Owens w/ Pieter) (night 1), Guerillas of Destiny (Tonga and Loa) would lose the IWGP tag team championships to Robinson and Finlay (night 1), White would lose the Intercontinental Championship back to Naito (night 1), LIJ (Evil, Takagi and Bushi) defeated Taguchi Japan (Makabe, Yano, and Taguchi) (c), Chaos (Ishii, Hashi and Eagles), Suzuki-gun (Taichi, Desperado and Kanemaru) and Bullet Club (Fale, Takahashi and Owens) in a Gauntlet match for the NEVER Openweight 6-Man Tag Team Championships (night 2), Ishimori and Phantasmo would lose the Junior Heavyweight Tag Team Championships back to Roppongi 3K (Sho and Yoh w/ Rocky Romero) (night 2), and Kenta would lose the NEVER Openweight Championship to Goto (night 2) and Jay White (w/ Gedo) defeated Kota Ibushi (night 2), the latter being Bullet Club's first and only win. After defeating Kazuchika Okada in the New Japan Cup 2020 finals, Evil then callout his fellow Los Ingobernables de Japon stablemate, leader and now future opponent double IWGP Champion Tetsuya Naito for a celebration, but ended in betrayal after performing "Everything is Evil" on Naito, with Bullet Club members Gedo, Jado, Ishimori and Takahashi joining in celebration, thus betraying LIJ and joining Bullet Club. The next night at Dominion in Osaka-jo Hall, Evil defeated Naito to become the IWGP Heavyweight and Intercontinental Double Champion with the help of Bullet Club's newest member Dick Togo. On August 21, 2020 Kenta defeated David Finlay to win the first ever New Japan Cup USA, and therefore earn a future match for the IWGP United States Championship.

On August 29, 2020, at Summer Struggle in Jingu, Ishimori would bring back the IWGP Junior Heavyweight Championship by beating Hiromu Takahashi, meanwhile Evil would lose the Heavyweight and Intercontinental titles back to Naito. Both Jay White and Kenta made their return to Japan for G1 Climax 30, with fellow Bullet Club members Evil and Takahashi also taking part in the tournament. The tournament marked the beginning of an internal conflict within Bullet Club, most notably on October 1 when Evil defeated Kenta with a low blow after interference from Togo. On October 5, Jay White during a backstage promo answered harshly against Evil for his previous actions against fellow member Kenta and addressed that he wouldn't have gotten far like winning both IWGP Heavyweight and IC titles if wasn't thanks to the Bullet Club. Both White (in block A) and Evil (in block B) came close to winning their respective blocks with scores of 12, but were ultimately unsuccessful. On November 7 at Power Struggle, Kenta successfully defended his New Japan Cup USA-earned IWGP United States Championship challenge rights certificate, while White defeated G1 Climax winner Kota Ibushi to win Ibushi's IWGP Heavyweight and Intercontinental Championships challenge rights certificate for Wrestle Kingdom 15, marking the first time in G1 Climax history that the winner would fail to successfully defend their challenge rights certificate. In the main event, Evil attempted to regain the Heavyweight and Intercontinental titles from Naito, with White interfering towards the end of the match, and teasing an attack on Evil before proceeding to attack Naito instead; however, Ibushi chased White away, and Naito eventually defeated Evil to retain his titles.

==== 2021 ====
At Wrestle Kingdom 15, White failed to win the Heavyweight and Intercontinental titles from Ibushi. In a backstage comment after the match, White without Gedo teased quitting the company, stating, "maybe my time should be spent somewhere else." At New Year's Dash the following day, White took the pin fall in a ten-man tag team match with Bad Luck Fale, Chase Owens, Evil, and Yujiro Takahashi, against Chaos members Yoshi-Hashi, Tomohiro Ishii, Kazuchika Okada, Hirooki Goto and Toru Yano (Ishii pinned White after a Vertical Drop Brainbuster). His teammates assisted him to the back. On the Road to The New Beginning on January 23, 2021, El Phantasmo and Taiji Ishimori defeated El Desperado and Yoshinobu Kanemaru of Suzuki-Gun to win the IWGP Junior Heavyweight Tag Team Championship for a second time. After a month-long hiatus, White returned on February 1 on the Road to the New Beginning show attacking Ishii continuing their feud.

On the February 3 episode of AEW Dynamite, Kenta appeared and launched a sneak attack on current IWGP United States Champion Jon Moxley after Moxley attacked Kenny Omega. After the match, Omega said he would team with Kenta in a match against Moxley and Lance Archer. At The New Beginning USA on February 26 Kenta finally received his title match against Moxley, but ultimately lost. At Road to Castle Attack on February 25 Ishimori and Phantasmo lost the IWGP Junior Heavyweight Tag Team Championship back to Suzuki-Gun. On Night 1 of Castle Attack Jay White defeated Tomohiro Ishii in the semi-main event while Evil lost to Kazuchika Okada in the main event. On the second night G.O.D. successfully retained their IWGP Tag Team titles against the team of Hirooki Goto and Yoshi-Hashi while El Phantasmo failed to win the vacant IWGP Junior Heavyweight Championship. On June 1, G.O.D. lost their IWGP Tag Team Championships to the Dangerous Tekkers. On June 23, At Kizuna Road Taiji Ishimori and El Phantasmo defeated Roppongi 3K to win the IWGP Junior Heavyweight Tag Team Championship for the third time.

Following Roppongi 3K's break-up during the August 16, 2021, edition of Super Junior Tag League, a grudge match between Sho and Yoh was set up on night one of Wrestle Grand Slam in MetLife Dome which Sho won. After the match, Bullet Club's EVIL, Yujiro Takahashi, and Dick Togo would enter the ring and present SHO with a Bullet Club shirt signalling SHO's welcoming into Bullet Club. They would announce the four of them would form a subgroup within Bullet Club called House of Torture. On November 6 at Power Struggle, Kenta defeated Hiroshi to win the IWGP United States Championship while House of Torture defeated Yoshi, Tomohiro, and Hirooki to win the NEVER Openweight 6-Man Tag Team Championship.

==== Expansion into Impact Wrestling/TNA Wrestling ====
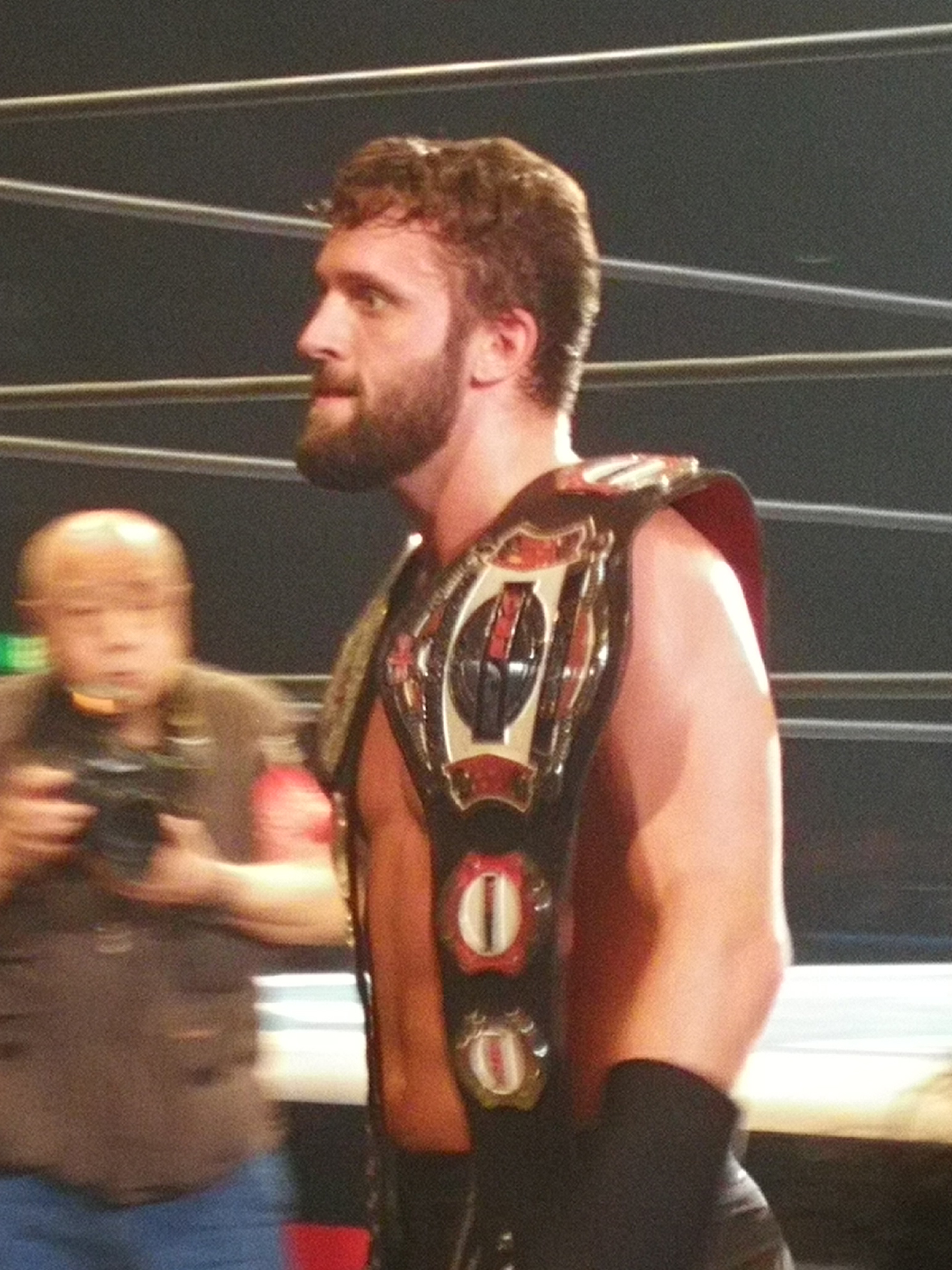
El Phantasmo, who along with Chris Bey and Hikuleo established a U.S. based branch of Bullet Club in Impact Wrestling in 2021

On the July 19 tapings for Impact Wrestling, Chris Bey took on Juice Robinson and after the match, Jay White gave Bey a Bullet Club shirt and the two threw up the "Too Sweet", making Bey the first African American wrestler and first active Impact star to join Bullet Club. Throughout the summer of 2021, Hikuleo and El Phantasmo would begin making frequent appearances in Impact Wrestling, and by fall would ultimately become listed as members of the Impact roster, establishing them and Bey as a U.S. based branch of the stable in Impact Wrestling. By late January, Jay White would return to Impact Wrestling and bring the G.O.D. along with him. On February 9, Jay White would walk through the Forbidden Door to AEW by seemingly helping The Elite take out Trent Barreta and Rocky Romero. At Impact Wrestling's No Surrender PPV, Jay White attacked G.O.D, costing them the Impact World Tag Team Championship and kicking them out of Bullet Club, while reinstating Gallows and Anderson.

On February 25, 2023, Ace Austin and Chris Bey, better known as ABC, defeated the Motor City Machine Guns (Alex Shelley and Chris Sabin) to capture the Impact World Tag Team Championships and bringing them back to Bullet Club. On July 15, at Slammiversary, Austin and Bey lost the tag titles to Subculture in a four-way tag team match also involving Rich Swann and Sami Callihan, and Moose and Brian Myers, thanks to The Rascalz interfering in the match. On July 20, during the rematch, The Rascalz once again cost Austin and Bey their rematch against Subculture for the Impact World Tag Team Championships. However, on IMPACT 1000, Austin and Bey were involved in a Feast or Fired match where Bey secured one of the cases which contained an Impact Tag team Title shot whenever they feel like it. On October 5, Impact announced that Bey and Austin would invoke this opportunity at Bound for Glory for the Impact World Tag Team Championship against The Rascalz. At Bound for Glory, Austin and Bey defeated The Rascalz to become Impact Tag Team Champions for the second time in their careers.

On March 8, 2024, at Sacrifice, Bey and Austin lost their tag team belts to Eddie Edwards, and Brian Myers of The System. On July 20, 2024, at Slammiversary, Austin and Bey won back their TNA World Tag Team Championship against The System members Eddie Edwards and Brian Myers. On September 13, 2024, at Victory Road, Austin and Bey lost their titles back to Edwards and Myers of The System. On Saturday October 26, 2024, at Bound for Glory Ace Austin, & Chris Bey were a part of a 3-way Full Metal Mayhem match with Eddie Edwards and Brian Myers of The System and Jeff Hardy and Matt Hardy of the Hardy Boyz The Hardys. However they were unsuccessful of getting the titles back as Matt Hardy and Jeff Hardy were victorious that night. On the following episode of Impact!, Bey suffered a broken neck, rendering him out of action indefinitely and putting the team on hiatus, leaving Austin as a singles competitor. In December 2024, the working relationship between NJPW and TNA quietly ended, therefore ABC quietly ceased their association with Bullet Club.

==== 2022 ====
At Wrestle Kingdom 16 Night 1, Evil defeated Tomohiro Ishii for the NEVER Openweight title, becoming a double champion again. At Night 2, Kenta lost the IWGP United States Heavyweight title back to Hiroshi Tanahashi. On February 19, Anderson and Gallows would rejoin the Bullet Club. On March 13, Evil defeated Tonga. Following this match, Evil and the rest of Bullet Club attacked G.o.D. and Jado, officially ejecting them from the group as a result, and siding with White. This would also break up Jado and Gedo's 33-year-long tenure as a tag team. On April 5, former nWo and nWo Japan member Scott Norton was announced on NJPW's official X account, that he would be joining The Good Brothers (Karl Anderson and Doc Gallows), Hikuleo, El Phantasmo and Chris Bey as an official member of Bullet Club for one night only in a 12-man Tag Team Match vs United Empire's Great-O-Khan, Jeff Cobb, TJP, Aaron Henare and Aussie Open (Kyle Fletcher and Mark Davis) at Windy City Riot on April 16, which resulted in a losing effort.

At Wrestling Dontaku 2022, Juice Robinson attacked Hiroshi Tanahashi post-match, becoming the newest member of the faction. At the Best of the Super Juniors 29 final on June 3, 2022, during a 6-man Tag Team match between Bullet Club and the United Empire, Ace Austin ran down to the ring and distracted Henare by pulling out an ace of spades playing card out of his sleeve that said "Bullet Club" on it which led to El Phantasmo hitting Henare with the "Sudden Death" superkick for the win. After the match, Ace Austin threw up the too sweet with Phantasmo, Fale, and Chase Owens, signifying his initiation into the faction. At Dominion 6.12 in Osaka-jo Hall, Fale and Owens lost the IWGP Heavyweight Tag Team Championship back to United Empire (Great-O-Khan and Jeff Cobb), while Juice Robinson was forced to vacate the IWGP United States Heavyweight Championship due to suffering appendicitis prior to the event, Karl Anderson defeated Tama Tonga to win the NEVER Openweight Championship and Jay White defeated Kazuchika Okada to win the IWGP World Heavyweight Championship. At Forbidden Door on June 26, 2022, Jay White retained the IWGP World Heavyweight Championship in a four-way match that also involved Kazuchika Okada and AEW wrestlers Adam Cole and Adam Page. El Phantasmo teamed up with The Young Bucks who briefly reunited with Bullet Club in a six-man tag team match against Dudes with Attitudes (Shingo Takagi, Sting and Darby Allin), which Phantasmo and the Bucks lost. At New Japan Road on July 5, the House of Torture lost the NEVER Openweight 6-Man Tag Team Championship to Hirooki Goto, YOH and Yoshi-Hashi.

At Burning Spirit on September 23, the House Of Torture regained the NEVER Openweight 6-Man Tag Team Championship. Two nights later on September 25, Hikuleo would turn his back on Bullet Club and side with his brother Tama Tonga. On October 10, Gallows and Anderson left the Bullet Club due to signing back with WWE. However, Anderson still had the NEVER Openweight Championship in his possession, leading to disputes between the two companies. In November NJPW would run the first Tamashii events where Bad Luck Fale began forming the "Rogue Army" subgroup with the recently recruited Jack Bonza.

==== 2023 ====
At Wrestle Kingdom 17 Night 1, Anderson lost the NEVER Openweight Championship to Tama Tonga, and White would lose the World Heavyweight title back to Okada. On the February 3 Tamashii event Lyrebird Luchi would be introduced as a new member, before Caveman Ugg was recruited the following night. On February 11, White lost to Hikuleo in a "Loser Leaves Japan Match" and Eddie Kingston in a "Loser Leaves New Japan Match" at Battle in the Valley on February 18, forcing him to leave NJPW in the process. After the match, White was attacked by former partner and longtime rival David Finlay before he could address the fans one last time.

=== David Finlay's leadership/War Dogs (2023–2026) ===
==== 2023 ====
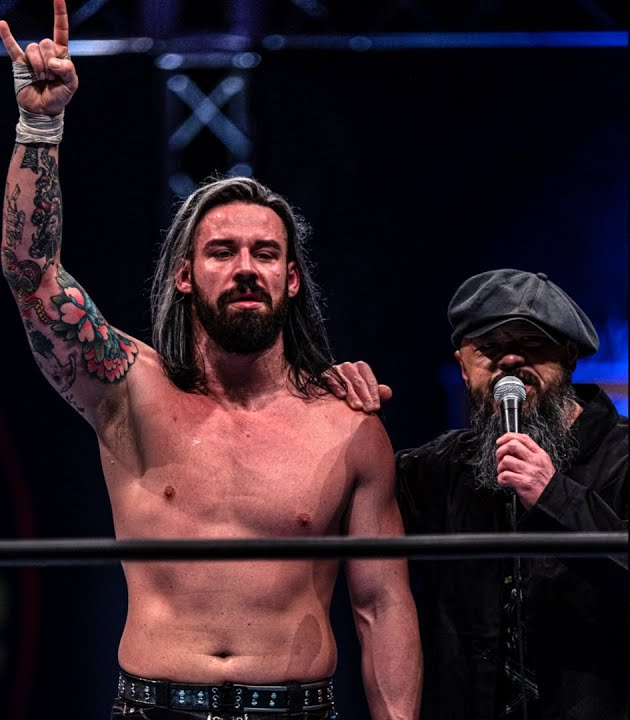
David Finlay with his manager Gedo, who took over as the fifth and final leader of Bullet Club in March 2023

On March 5 at the NJPW 51st Anniversary Show, after David Finlay defeated Tomohiro Ishii in the first round of the New Japan Cup, Gedo cut a promo after the match saying, "Bullet Club needs a rebel", making Finlay the new leader of Bullet Club. El Phantasmo wasn't happy about this because he said all of the members of Bullet Club had agreed to not attack Jay White and kick him from Bullet Club. El Phantasmo openly opposed Finlay and at Sakura Genesis, Finlay and Kenta would turn on Phantasmo after the match, removing him from Bullet Club. At Capital Collision, Finlay would replace El Phantasmo with Clark Connors. On April 16, the Natural Classics would be inducted into Bullet Club's sub group, the Rogue Army in Tamashii. At Dominion 6.4 in Osaka-jo Hall, Dan Moloney would join Bullet Club after attacking Francesco Akira and TJP with Connors after they won IWGP Junior Heavyweight Tag Team Championship, betraying United Empire. The same night, Alex Coughlin and Gabe Kidd would also join Bullet Club by attacking the newly crowned IWGP Tag Team and Strong Openweight Tag Team Champions Yoshi-Hashi and Goto. At the same time, Jay White also appeared on All Elite Wrestling, where he created his own sub-faction, Bang Bang Gang.

==== 2024 ====
At Wrestle Kingdom 18, Finlay defeated Will Ospreay and Jon Moxley to become the inaugural IWGP Global Heavyweight Champion. At New Year Dash!!, Bullet Club War Dogs were scheduled in a ten-man tag against United Empire, however, the match never began as the two stables brawled with each other ending the match in a no contest. After the match, Ospreay challenged Bullet Club War Dogs to a match at The New Beginning in Osaka and allowed Finlay to pick the stipulation. Finlay made the match a steel cage match and it was later made official. At The New Beginning in Nagoya, Evil defeated Tama Tonga to capture his third NEVER Openweight Championship. At The New Beginning in Osaka, Bullet Club War Dogs defeated United Empire.

On night 1 of The New Beginning in Sapporo, Sho defeated El Desperado to win his first IWGP Junior Heavyweight Championship, while Finlay lost his IWGP Global Heavyweight Championship to Nic Nemeth. On March 6, House of Torture assisted Jack Perry to defeat Shota Umino in the first round of the 2024 New Japan Cup. After the match, Perry accepted House of Torture's offer to join the stable. On March 23, Coughlin announced his retirement from professional wrestling. At Sakura Genesis, Evil lost the NEVER Openweight Championship to Shingo Takagi. On April 23, Pro Wrestling Noah's Jake Lee assisted Moloney in his defeat of Tetsuya Naito, kicking off a feud between Lee and Naito. Lee has continued working in partnership with the War Dogs while he feuds with Naito, however he has not been acknowledged by NJPW as an actual member of the group and is still contracted to Pro Wrestling Noah. At Wrestling Dontaku: Night 2, Finlay defeated Nemeth to win back the IWGP Global Heavyweight Championship.

On July 13 at Noah Destination 2024, Jake Lee's Good Looking Guys stable held their official disbandment match as a six-man tag between the stablemates, with Lee, Yo-Hey, and Tadasuke defeating Jack Morris, Anthony Greene and LJ Cleary. After the match, Gedo presented Lee with a Bullet Club War Dogs shirt. Lee accepted it over Morris' objection, before attacking his protesting stablemate and announcing his departure from NOAH to join Bullet Club. In early October Ishimori would announce that he and a new member, revealed to be Robbie X at Royal Quest IV, would be competing in the Super Junior Tag League. On November 4 at Power Struggle, Sanada joined Bullet Club War Dogs by assisting Finlay retain his Global Heavyweight Championship against Taichi.

==== 2025 ====
After Wrestle Kingdom 19, where Finlay lost the IWGP Global Heavyweight Championship, the stable changed the formation. Kenta left the stable when he also left NJPW while, in a post show interview, Ishimori announced that he was now a member of Bullet Club War Dogs. At The New Beginning in Osaka, Bullet Club factions War Dogs and House of Torture started a feud where Chase Owens joined the War Dogs and Sanada turned on the War Dogs and joined House of Torture in the process. Meanwhile, Finlay won the New Japan Cup, challenging Hirooki Goto for the IWGP World Heavyweight Championship at Sakura Genesis, where he lost. The two factions wrestled in a Dog Pound match at Wrestling Dontaku: Night 1 where the losers must leave Bullet Club. At the event, the War Dogs defeated House of Torture. Bad Luck Fale and Chase Owens, members of War Dogs, later left the faction and joined the House of Torture. Bullet Club members unsuccessfully competed in the G1 Climax 35 following which the Knock Out Brothers (Oskar and Yuto-Ice) joined War Dogs, while Ace Austin rejoined the stable as part of the Bang Bang Gang. The Knock Out Brothers defeated Taichi and Ishii to win the IWGP World Tag Team Championship, while Kidd lost the IWGP Global Heavyweight Championship back to Tsuji, following which the War Dogs made an alliance with Tsuji's Unaffiliated group. Bullet Clubs members would partner with Unaffiliated in the 2025 Super Junior Tag League and 2025 World Tag League, but lost both tournaments.

==== 2026 ====
On January 4, 2026, at Wrestle Kingdom 20, Jake Lee left the War Dogs and joined the United Empire to defeat Finlay, Moloney, Kidd, Takagi, and Takahashi in a ten-man tag team match. On January 5, 2026, David Finlay and Yota Tsuji announced the dissolution of the stable, officially merging War Dogs and Unaffiliated into the new Unbound Co. stable.

== Reception ==
The group has been compared to the World Championship Wrestling stable New World Order (nWo). As a way of paying homage to the nWo, members of Bullet Club began using the stable's signature "Too Sweet" hand gesture. The gesture, also known as the "Turkish Wolf", had supposedly been used by Anderson and Devitt behind the scenes since 2006. In March 2015, WWE filed a trademark application for the hand gesture. Some, including Matt and Nick Jackson, suggested this was done due to Bullet Club's popularity. The application was ultimately abandoned by WWE. In August 2015, after Devitt had joined WWE as "Finn Bálor", WWE released "Bálor Club" merchandise playing off Bullet Club. WWE recognized Bullet Club in the first week of January 2016, when discussing rumors about members of the stable joining the promotion, preceding A.J. Styles' debut in the WWE as a 2016 Royal Rumble contestant. In April 2016, the former Bullet Club tag team of Karl Anderson and Luke Gallows debuted for WWE, with their NJPW background again being acknowledged by the company, eventually forming "The Club/The O.C." with Styles.

On September 25, 2017, Bullet Club appeared outside WWE's Raw show in Ontario, California, spoofing a segment from 1998 where D-Generation X "invaded" WCW Nitro. Afterwards, WWE sent members of the stable a cease and desist letter, claiming they were using the company's intellectual property, specifically the "Too Sweet" hand gesture, leading to merchandise featuring the gesture being pulled from stores. WWE writer Jimmy Jacobs was let go by the company for posting a photo on Instagram with members of Bullet Club, taken during the mock invasion. They returned to use the "Too Sweet" hand gesture only during the 2017 World Tag League press conference. The nWo's founding member Kevin Nash has praised Bullet Club as a more athletic version of the nWo, stating that there is mutual respect between the two stables, and informally passing the torch from his stable to Bullet Club. Jeff Jarrett, who has represented both Bullet Club and nWo, has named in-ring ability as the main difference between the two stables, stating "Bullet Club is off the charts bell to bell more talented". Former NJPW wrestler Matt Bloom has stated that Bullet Club's popularity helped the promotion become global.

Bullet Club has garnered a substantial amount of worldwide popularity, especially among American professional wrestling fans. As of March 2016, the stable's original "Bone Soldier" shirt was the top selling shirt on the Pro Wrestling Tees store, outselling all top independent wrestlers and WWE veterans that are affiliated with the site. In 2017, Bullet Club shirts were made available at Hot Topic stores, where they also became big sellers, supposedly selling 100,000 copies in the first three months. Hot Topic executives reportedly became aware of Bullet Club after seeing the large number of the stable's shirts being worn by fans at WWE's WrestleMania 33. WWE then had to "awkwardly" tell the executives that the shirt was not one of theirs. Bullet Club's popularity in the United States has led to members of the stable working as babyfaces at events held in the country.

== Related and inspired groups ==
Former Bullet Club members AJ Styles, Karl Anderson and Luke Gallows started a new Bullet Club-inspired group, The O.C. (originally known as "The Club"), while in WWE. Later, original Bullet Club leader Finn Bálor, previously known as Prince Devitt, would form Bálor Club with Anderson and Gallows. In 2022, Styles and Bálor joined forces in an informal incarnation of the club also including Liv Morgan, during a feud with The Judgment Day which consisted of Edge, Rhea Ripley and Damian Priest at the time. Bálor would abandon Styles and Morgan to join The Judgment Day, also urging them to oust Edge from the group, and would later attempt to recruit Styles, who rejected the offer. This led to Styles reconstituting The O.C. with Anderson and Gallows, who later added Mia Yim to its ranks.

The Elite, originally a Bullet Club sub-group, became an independent entity in NJPW before its members ultimately left the promotion to set up the American wrestling promotion All Elite Wrestling (AEW). In AEW, the group was referred to as "The Super Elite", following the additions of then-Impact talent Don Callis, Anderson, and Gallows to the group. The Elite later expanded to include Adam Cole, Bobby Fish, and Kyle O'Reilly – former members of the WWE stable The Undisputed Era – and briefly became known as The Undisputed Elite before the stable fell apart.

Another unit which was originally a tag team within Bullet Club is Guerrillas of Destiny, which originally consisted of Tama Tonga and his brother Tanga Loa. They were kicked out of Bullet Club by Jay White in February 2022 and were followed by former Bullet Club mate Jado. They were later joined by their younger brother Hikuleo in September 2022 and El Phantasmo in July 2023. Tonga and Loa (who went by the modified ring name of Tonga Loa) would later join Solo Sikoa in his hostile takeover of The Bloodline stable, originally founded by Roman Reigns and The Usos of the Anoaʻi family, in April and May 2024. In July 2024, Hikuleo left, concluding the group's dissolution with Phantasmo being the only one remaining with NJPW while Tonga and Loa began to compete under the name of The Tongans. In June 2025, Hikuleo would formally make his debut in WWE, joining his brothers, along with former United Empire member Jeff Cobb, now competing by the name JC Mateo, in Sikoa's now-offshoot Bloodline faction under the new ring name of Talla Tonga. A month later the group was officially renamed MFT (My Family Tree) by Sikoa.

Following the absorption of Bullet Club into Yota Tsuji's Unbound Co. in January 2026, Jay White's Bang Bang Gang, originally established in AEW as the sub-faction Bullet Club Gold, continued to operate as an independent spin-off stable. In March 2026, former Bullet Club members Clark Connors, David Finlay, and Gabe Kidd formed The Dogs stable in AEW, a spinoff stable to the War Dogs sub-group of Bullet Club. In October 2026, the Bang Bang Gang and The Dogs merged to form The Cut.

== Other media ==
In January 2016, NJPW announced a DVD chronicling the history of Bullet Club and featuring interviews with members of the stable, which was released on March 30, 2016. In January 2017, it was announced that the arcade game Tekken 7: Fated Retribution would feature a variety of Bullet Club related apparel for use with all characters. The outfits would later be available in the home version of Tekken 7.

== Championships and accomplishments ==
- AAW Wrestling
  - AAW Heritage Championship (1 time) – Ace Austin
- All Elite Wrestling
  - AEW World Trios Championship (1 time) – Jay White and The Gunns
  - Dynamite Dozen Battle Royale (2023) – Juice Robinson
- All Pro Wrestling
  - APW Junior Heavyweight Championship (1 time, final) – Chris Bey
- Battle Championship Wrestling
  - BCW Tag Team Championship (1 time) – The Natural Classics (Stevie Filip and Tome Filip)
- Canadian Wrestling's Elite
  - Elite 8 (2017) – Chase Owens
- Consejo Mundial de Lucha Libre
  - CMLL World Heavyweight Championship (1 time) – El Terrible
  - CMLL World Tag Team Championship (2 times) – El Terrible and Tama Tonga (1), Rey Bucanero and Tama Tonga (1)
  - Mexican National Light Heavyweight Championship (1 time) – Mephisto
- Global Force Wrestling
  - GFW NEX*GEN Championship (1 time) – Cody
- DDT Pro-Wrestling
  - Ironman Heavymetalweight Championship (1 time) – Ishimori
- DEFY Wrestling
  - DEFY World Championship (2 time) – Kenta (1), Connors (1)
  - Super 8XGP Tournament (2025) – Connors
- NWA Smoky Mountain Wrestling
  - NWA Southeastern Heavyweight Championship (1 time) – Chase Owens
- Family Wrestling Entertainment
  - FWE Heavyweight Championship (1 time) – AJ Styles
  - FWE Tag Team Championship (1 time) – Young Bucks
- Future Stars of Wrestling
  - FSW Mecca Grand Championship (1 time) – Chris Bey
  - FSW Tag Team Championship (1 time) – Ace Austin and Chris Bey
- German Wrestling Federation
  - Light Heavyweight World Cup (2019) – El Phantasmo
- Impact Wrestling/Total Nonstop Action Wrestling
  - Impact/TNA World Tag Team Championship (5 times) – The Good Brothers (2), Ace Austin and Chris Bey (3)
  - Impact X Division Championship (1 time) – Ace Austin
  - Feast or Fired (2023) – Tag Team Championship contract) – Chris Bey
  - Impact/TNA Year End Award (2 times)
    - Male Tag Team of the Year (2023, 2024) – Ace Austin and Chris Bey
- Melbourne City Wrestling
  - MCW World Heavyweight Championship (2 times) – Caveman Ugg
- National Wrestling Alliance
  - NWA World Women's Championship (1 time) – Amber O'Neal/Gallows
  - NWA World Heavyweight Championship (1 time) – Cody
- New Japan Pro-Wrestling
  - IWGP Heavyweight Championship (6 times) – AJ Styles (2), Kenny Omega (1), Jay White (2), Evil (1)
  - IWGP Global Heavyweight Championship (3 times, inaugural) – David Finlay (2, inaugural), Gabe Kidd (1)
  - IWGP Intercontinental Championship (5 times) – Bad Luck Fale (1), Kenny Omega (1), Jay White (2), Evil (1)
  - IWGP Junior Heavyweight Championship (8 times) – Prince Devitt (1), (Note: Devitt is a three-time former champion, but his first two reigns pre-date the formation of Bullet Club.) Kenny Omega (2), Marty Scurll (1), Taiji Ishimori (3), Sho (1)
  - IWGP Junior Heavyweight Tag Team Championship (12 times) Young Bucks (7), El Phantasmo and Taiji Ishimori (3), Drilla Moloney and Clark Connors (2)
  - IWGP Tag Team Championship (15 times) – Good Brothers (3), Tanga Loa and Tama Tonga (7), Young Bucks (1), Bad Luck Fale and Chase Owens (1), Chase Owens and Kenta (2), Knock Out Brothers (1)
  - IWGP United States Championship (4 times) – Kenny Omega (1), Cody (1), Kenta (1), Juice Robinson (1)
  - NEVER Openweight Championship (7 times) – Yujiro Takahashi (1), Kenta (1), Jay White (1), Evil (3), Karl Anderson (1), David Finlay (1)
  - NJPW World Television Championship (1 time) – Narita
  - Strong Openweight Championship (3 times) – Kenta (2), Kidd (1)
  - Strong Openweight Tag Team Championship (1 time) – Alex Coughlin & Gabe Kidd
  - NEVER Openweight 6-Man Tag Team Championship (10 times) – Bad Luck Fale, Yujiro Takahashi and Tama Tonga (1), Kenny Omega and Young Bucks (2), Bad Luck Fale, Tama Tonga and Tanga Loa (2), Marty Scurll and Young Bucks (1), Taiji Ishimori, Tama Tonga and Tanga Loa (1), Evil, Sho and Yujiro Takahashi (2), Narita, Sho and Takahashi (1)
  - Best of the Super Juniors (2013) – Prince Devitt
  - World Tag League (2013) – Good Brothers
  - World Tag League (2020) – Tanga Loa and Tama Tonga
  - Super J-Cup (2019, 2020) – El Phantasmo
  - Super Jr. Tag Tournament (2013) – Young Bucks
  - G1 Climax (2016) – Kenny Omega
  - New Japan Cup (2020) – Evil
  - New Japan Cup (2025) – Finlay
  - New Japan Cup USA (2020) – Kenta
  - NJPW Tamashii Oceania Cup (2024) – Jack J. Bonza
  - New Japan Rambo (2021) – Bad Luck Fale and Chase Owens
  - IWGP United States Championship Tournament (2017) – Kenny Omega
  - KOPW (3 times) – Chase Owens (1), Sho (1) and Taiji Ishimori (1)
  - STRONG Survivor (2023) – Kenta
- Pro Wrestling Guerrilla
  - PWG World Tag Team Championship (1 time) – Young Bucks
- Pro Wrestling Illustrated
  - Feud of the Year (2017) Kenny Omega vs. Kazuchika Okada
- DDT Pro-Wrestling
  - Ironman Heavymetalweight Championship (2 times) – Young Bucks (1), Brandi Rhodes (1)
- Rocket City Championship Wrestling
  - RCCW Sean Shocker Evans Memorial Tournament (2024) – Chase Owens
- Renegades Of Wrestling
  - ROW World Championship (1 time) – Caveman Ugg
- Revolution Pro Wrestling
  - RPW British Heavyweight Championship (1 time) – AJ Styles
  - RPW British Cruiserweight Championship (2 times) – Prince Devitt (1), El Phantasmo (1)
- Ring of Honor
  - ROH World Championship (3 times) – Adam Cole (2), Cody (1)
  - ROH World Six-Man Tag Team Championship (3 times) – Adam Page and Young Bucks (1), (Note: Cody, Omega and Scurll were also allowed to defend the title under Bullet Club Rules. However, only Page and The Young Bucks were recognized as official champions.) Cody and Young Bucks (1), Jay White and The Gunns (1)
  - ROH World Tag Team Championship (4 times) – Tanga Loa and Tama Tonga (1), Young Bucks (3)
  - ROH World Television Championship (1 time) – Marty Scurll
  - ROH Wrestler of the Year (2017) – Cody
  - Tag Team of the Year (2017) – Young Bucks
  - Best Final Battle Entrance (2017) – Marty Scurll
  - Breakout Star of the Year (2017) – Adam Page
- Slam! Pro Wrestling League
  - Slam! Tag Team Championship (1 time, inaugural) – The Natural Classics (Stevie Filip and Tome Filip)
- Sports Illustrated
  - Wrestler of the Year (2017) – Kenny Omega
- Texas Wrestling Cartel
  - TWC Tag Team Championship (1 time, inaugural) – Chase Owens and Kenta
- TNT Extreme Wrestling
  - TNT Ultra X Championship (1 time) – Robbie X
- Tri States Wrestling
  - TSW Heavyweight Championship (1 time) – Ace Austin
- Tokyo Sports
  - Technique Award (2016) – Kenny Omega
  - Best Bout Award (2017) Kenny Omega vs. Kazuchika Okada on January 4
  - Best Bout Award (2018) Kenny Omega vs. Kazuchika Okada on June 9
- World Series Wrestling
  - WSW World Heavyweight Championship (1 time) – Robbie Eagles
  - WSW Tag Team Championship (1 time) – Young Bucks
- WrestleCircus
  - Big Top Tag-Team Championship (1 time) – Tanga Loa and Tama Tonga
- What Culture Pro Wrestling/Defiant Wrestling
  - WCPW/Defiant Championship (1 time) – Marty Scurll
  - WCPW Internet Championship (1 time) – Cody
- Wrestling Observer Newsletter
  - Best Wrestling Maneuver
    - (2014) Young Bucks' Meltzer Driver
    - (2015) AJ Styles' Styles Clash
    - (2016, 2017, 2018) Kenny Omega's One-Winged Angel
  - Feud of the Year (2017) Kenny Omega vs. Kazuchika Okada
  - Most Outstanding Wrestler
    - (2014, 2015, 2016) AJ Styles
    - (2018) – Kenny Omega
  - Japan MVP (2018) – Kenny Omega
  - Most Improved (2018) – Adam Page
  - Pro Wrestling Match of the Year
    - (2014) AJ Styles vs. Minoru Suzuki on August 1
    - (2017) Kenny Omega vs. Kazuchika Okada on January 4
    - (2018) Kenny Omega vs. Kazuchika Okada on June 9
  - Tag Team of the Year (2014, 2015, 2016, 2017, 2018) Young Buck
  - Worst Gimmick (2016) Bone Soldier
  - Most Overrated (2021) Evil
  - Wrestler of the Year (2015, 2016) AJ Styles
  - Best Booker – Gedo (2018, 2019)
  - Wrestling Observer Newsletter Hall of Fame (Class of 2019) – Gedo

== See also ==
- The O.C. (professional wrestling)
- New World Order (professional wrestling)
- The Elite (professional wrestling)
- The Cut (professional wrestling)
