= Silent fox gesture =

Hand gesture used in education

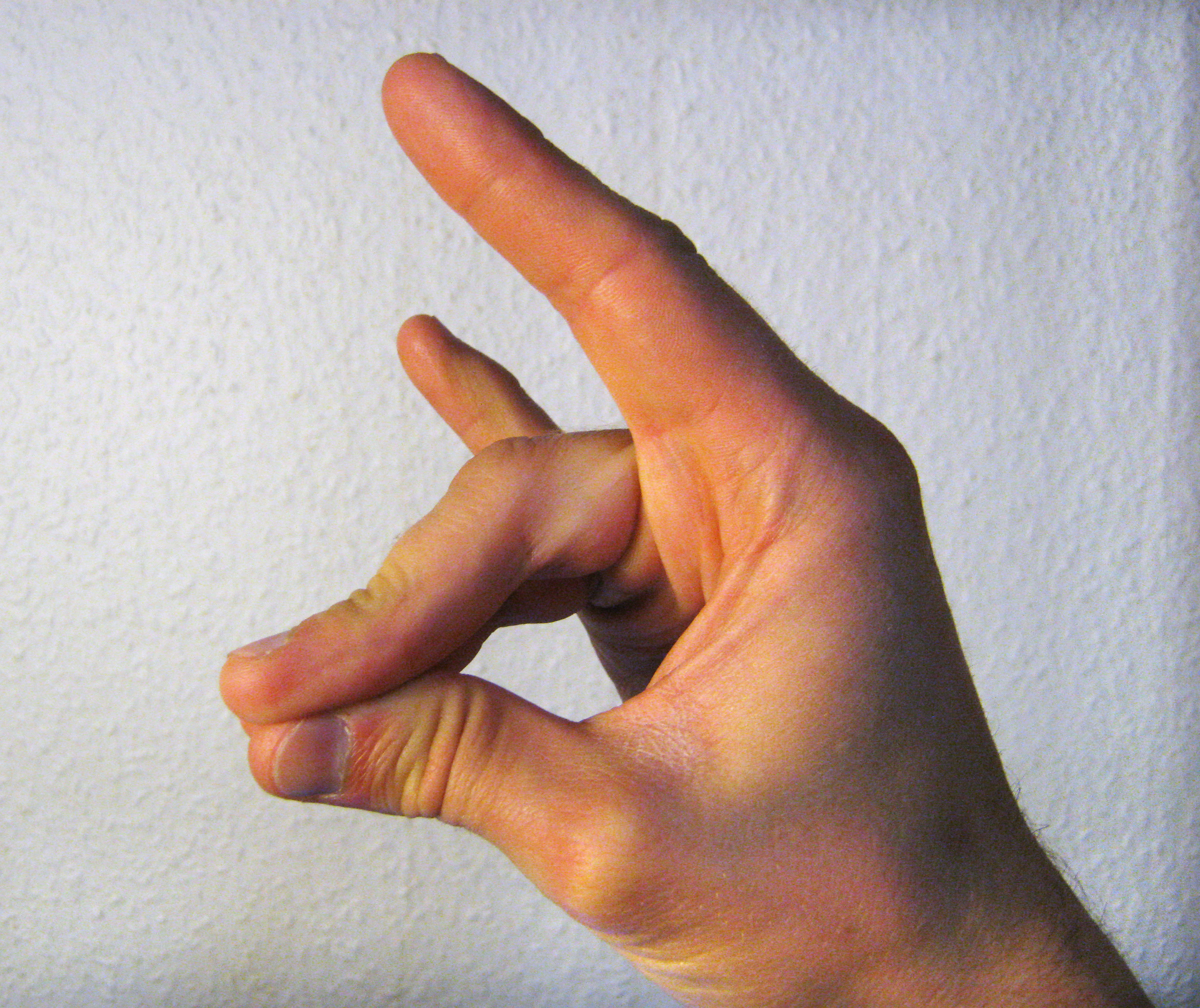
The silent fox hand signal

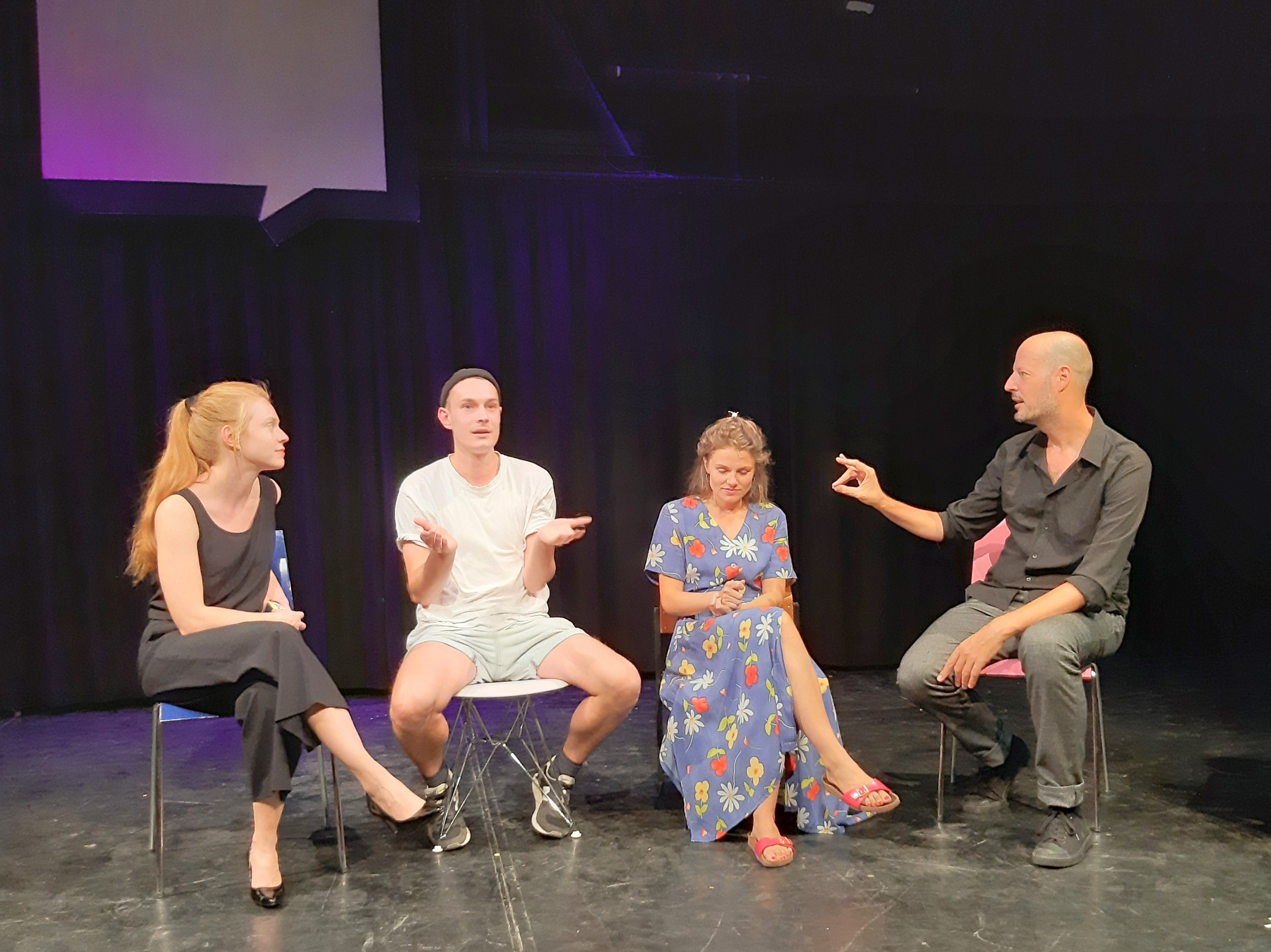
A man (right) using the silent fox gesture at a rehearsal in the Staatsschauspiel Dresden

The silent fox, also known as the quiet fox, whispering fox, listening fox, or the quiet coyote, is a hand gesture used in parts of Europe and North America, and is mostly done in schools by teachers to calm down a loud classroom.

The silent fox gesture is supposed to be a sign of non-verbal communication. If the noise level within a classroom rises above a certain level, the teacher can raise their hand and show the silent fox. The silent fox gesture depicts a fox with its ears pointed up and its mouth closed. It is intended to encourage the students to do the same as the fox, which is to listen closely and to stop speaking.

The silent fox is also used in speech therapy, and often used in family homes and in group counseling or therapy to calm down the competitive speaker environment. The one making the silent fox gesture is the one who can speak, this teaches the kids that "only one person can speak at a time". This has a positive effect on decreasing cluttering, especially in younger children.

Usage has declined in some areas of Europe as the gesture is also used as the wolf salute, a Turkish nationalist gesture. Because of this, several alternative signals have been used instead of the silent fox, such as the use of acoustic signals or active movement around the classroom.
