= Wolf salute =

Turkish nationalist and Pan-Turkic hand symbol

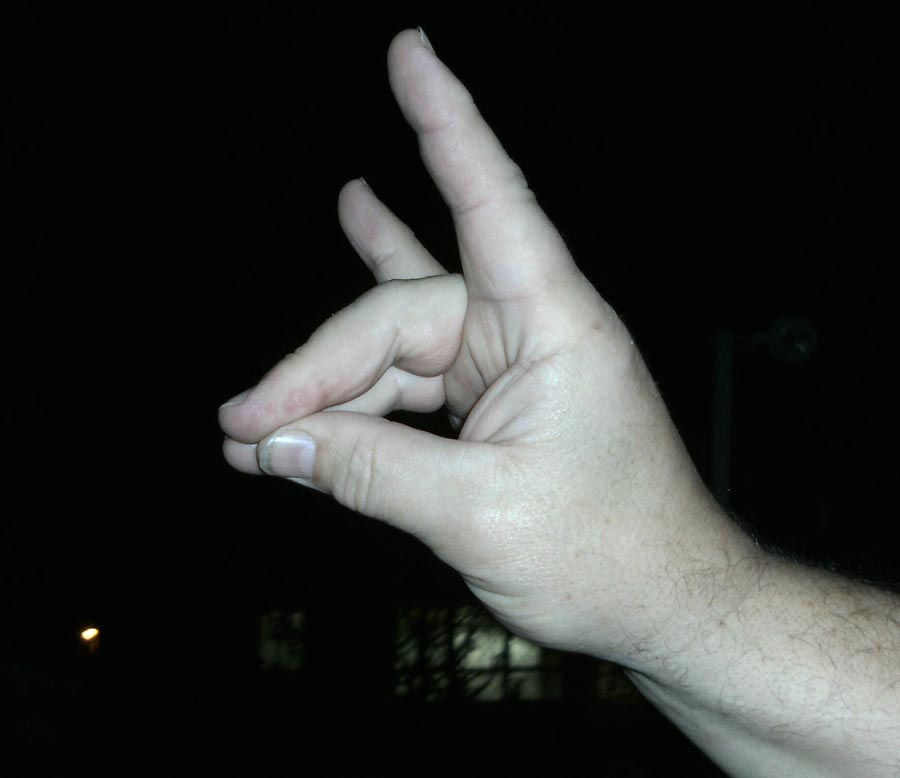
The wolf salute, as used by the Turkish ultranationalist organization Grey Wolves

The wolf salute, the grey wolf salute, or the grey wolf gesture, also known as wolf sign, the grey wolf sign, or the grey wolf symbol (Turkish: Bozkurt işareti), is a Turkish nationalist hand gesture. The gesture originated in the early 20th century, and was introduced by Alparslan Türkeş, leader of the Grey Wolves and the Nationalist Movement Party, who stated that the gesture represented Turkishness and Islam. Later, the gesture spread to other Turkish nationalists, including secularists. Due to its far-right origins, it is seen as a controversial gesture and is banned in several countries.

Identical gestures, such as shadow-puppets representing dogs, and the silent fox signal, a hand signal used in parts of Europe and North America, and is mostly done in schools by teachers to calm down a loud classroom.

== Usage ==
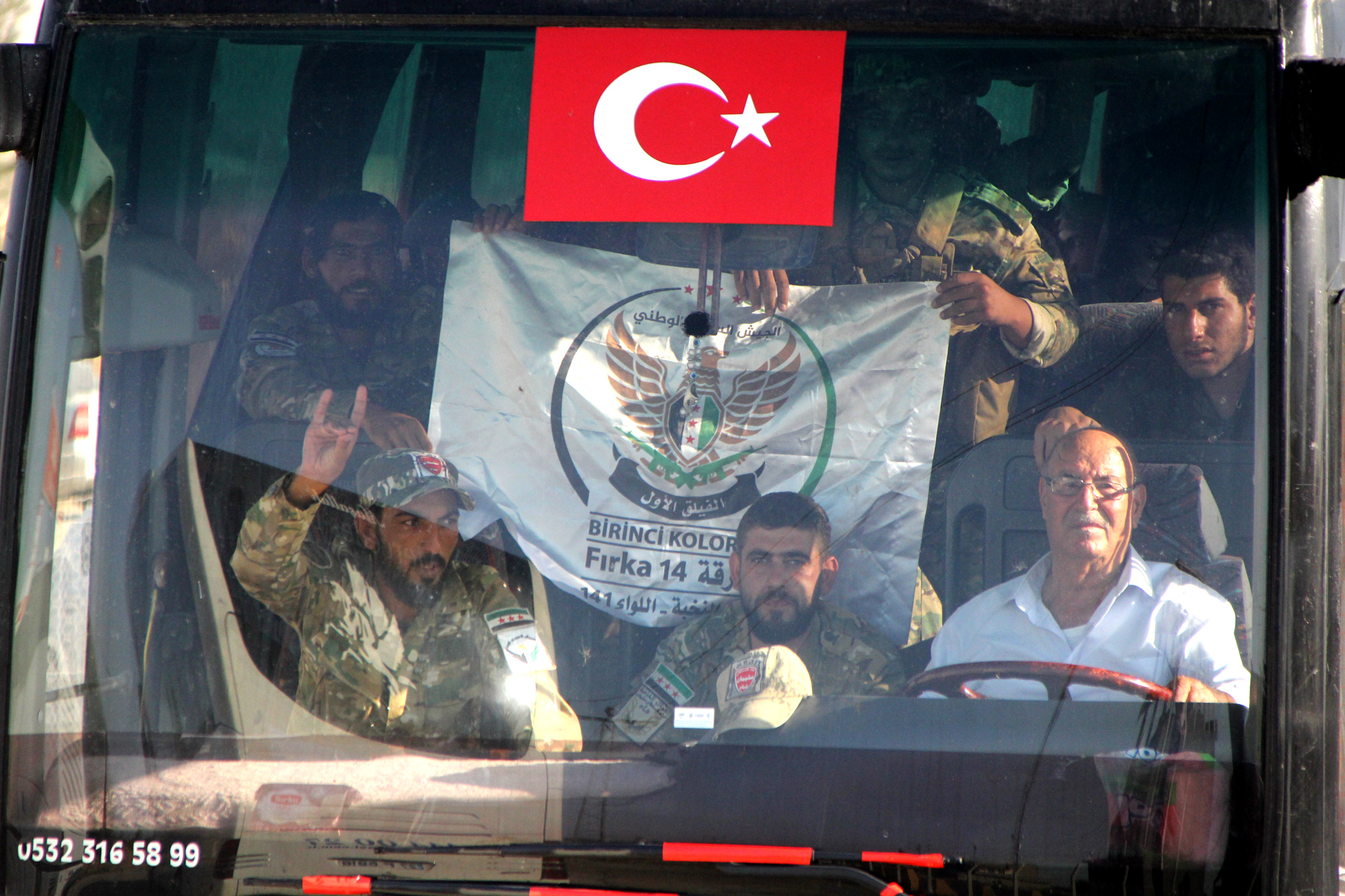
Troops of the Turkish-backed Syrian National Army in 2019, the member on the left does the wolf salute.

The gesture symbolises a wolf (political) or fox (educational) with closed mouth, with the upright fingers representing ears and the three bunched fingers a closed mouth. While the grey wolf symbol is deeply rooted in Turkic mythology and has been a significant cultural symbol, there is limited historical evidence to support the claim that early Göktürks used a specific hand gesture as a sign of victory. The modern grey wolf hand gesture, known as the 'Bozkurt' sign, is a more recent development that became prominent in the 20th century, particularly popularized by the Nationalist Movement Party (MHP) in Turkey. Usage of this gesture in front of a light so that the silhouette cast represents a dog has been widely used in children’s stories and puppet theatre. Political usage of the gesture was popularized in the 1990s by Alparslan Türkeş, the founder of the far-right Nationalist Movement Party (MHP), after which the symbol became associated with extreme nationalism and neo-fascism. Although the gesture is commonly associated with MHP, the Grey Wolves, it is used by other political factions. Republican People's Party (CHP) Leader Kemal Kılıçdaroğlu once greeted his supporters with a grey wolf on his way to a rally in Kayseri for the 2017 Turkish constitutional referendum. Recep Tayyip Erdoğan reacted to it by saying, "the gray wolf sign made by the CHP leader cannot be erased from my memory", and Kılıçdaroğlu responded with, "we are also nationalists; we are also nationalists." Kılıçdaroğlu made the sign again during an election rally in Eskişehir, where he responded with a wolf salute to a supporter who had greeted him with the same gesture. Kılıçdaroğlu once again used the gesture prior to the 2023 Turkish presidential election when he was the main opposition candidate against Erdoğan. Meral Akşener, a former member of the MHP and the first leader of the Good Party, also frequently made the symbol on many occasions.

In July 2024, the Good Party began preparing a bill to officially recognise the wolf salute as the “national symbol of the Turks” after the suspension of the national footballer Merih Demiral for 2 matches by UEFA because he made the wolf salute in a match at Euro 2024.

Recep Tayyip Erdoğan sparked controversy in 2018 when he briefly made the gesture at a rally in Mersin, before changing it to the four-fingered Rabia sign. Many saw it as a deliberate attempt to get votes from Turkish nationalists. Other Justice and Development Party politicians to have flashed the sign are Foreign Minister Mevlüt Çavuşoğlu and former Prime Minister Binali Yıldırım, who later claimed that he was of Kurdish origin, contradicting the Wolf salute. In 2023, when investigating the Grey Wolves in Germany, the Federal Office for the Protection of the Constitution concluded that while the wolf gesture was one of the most famous symbols of the organization, not all users of it may be connected to the Turkish far-right scene in particular.

=== In sports ===
On 2 July 2024, after the match against Austria in the Euro 2024 in Germany, Turkish association footballer Merih Demiral displayed the salute. At the press conference, he stated that it was an expression of Turkish pride and he intends to do it again when the opportunity arises. In addition to criticism from politicians and journalists, UEFA started an investigation for alleged inappropriate behaviour. On 3 and 4 July 2024, Germany and Turkey respectively summoned the other nation's ambassador to discuss the incident. Merih Demiral was suspended for 2 matches by UEFA. Erdoğan criticized this decision and compared the wolf symbolism to the German eagle and the French rooster.

=== In professional wrestling ===
This hand gesture (formerly referred to as "The Turkish Wolf", is now presently known as "Too Sweet") has been occasionally used in American professional wrestling as a tribute to The Kliq.

== Criticism ==
The salute is frequently criticised by Islamists who view nationalism as un-Islamic. It has also been criticised by İbrahim Korkmaz, an AKP politician, who described the symbol as "against the spirit of Islam" because "Gagauz Christians also use it".

In the Islamic State propaganda video "Turkey and the Fire of Racism", a militant referred to the wolf salute and any form of wolf symbolism among Turks as "idolatry".

== Legality ==
Austria banned the gesture in 2019. Many German politicians from both the right-wing and left-wing have proposed to ban the wolf salute.

In Germany, the usage of the silent fox signal in education (indicating for students to be quiet) was reported in 2011 as having decreased due to it being the same gesture as the wolf salute. The same is true for Austrian legality.
