= Hyper Battle '22 =

2022 New Japan Pro-Wrestling professional wrestling event

- Promotion: New Japan Pro-Wrestling
- Date: April 9, 2022
- City: Tokyo, Japan
- Venue: Ryōgoku Kokugikan
- Attendance: 4,755

Event chronology
← Previous; Lonestar Shootout 2022; New Japan Cup	Next → Windy City Riot

Hyper Battle '22 was a professional wrestling event produced by New Japan Pro-Wrestling (NJPW). It took place on April 9, 2022 in Tokyo at Ryōgoku Kokugikan. The event was named after the Hyper Battle events which originally took place from 1993 until 2004.

== Storylines ==
Hyper Battle '22 featured eight professional wrestling matches that involved different wrestlers from pre-existing scripted feuds and storylines. Wrestlers portrayed villains, heroes, or less distinguishable characters in the scripted events that built tension and culminated in a wrestling match or series of matches.

On March 27, 2022, Zack Sabre Jr. won the New Japan Cup for the second time after defeating Tetsuya Naito in the tournament final with Sabre challenging for the IWGP World Heavyweight Championship. The match between Sabre and the champion Kazuchika Okada for the title was made official the following day.

== Results ==
No.	Results	Stipulations	Times
1	Hiroshi Tanahashi and Guerrillas of Destiny (Tama Tonga, Tanga Loa, and Jado) defeated Bullet Club (Bad Luck Fale, Chase Owens, Yujiro Takahashi, and Gedo) by submission	Eight-man tag team match	10:28
2	Los Ingobernables de Japon (Tetsuya Naito and Shingo Takagi) defeated United Empire (Will Ospreay and Aaron Henare) by pinfall	Tag team match	9:23
3	Six or Nine (Ryusuke Taguchi and Master Wato) (c) defeated Bullet Club's Cutest Tag Team (Taiji Ishimori and El Phantasmo) by pinfall	Tag team match for the IWGP Junior Heavyweight Tag Team Championship	15:13
4	Taichi defeated Toru Yano (c)	No-rope ring-out match for the Provisional KOPW 2022 Trophy	4:18
5	Evil (c) defeated Hiromu Takahashi by pinfall	Singles match for the NEVER Openweight Championship	15:47
6	United Empire (Great-O-Khan and Jeff Cobb) defeated Bishamon (Hirooki Goto and Yoshi-Hashi) (c) by pinfall	Tag team match for the IWGP Tag Team Championship	16:05
7	El Desperado (c) defeated Sho by pinfall	Singles match for the IWGP Junior Heavyweight Championship	20:33
8	Kazuchika Okada (c) defeated Zack Sabre Jr. by pinfall	Singles match for the IWGP World Heavyweight Championship	28:25
(c) / – the champion(s) heading into the match
