= NJPW 49th Anniversary Show =

2021 professional wrestling event

- Promotion: New Japan Pro-Wrestling
- Date: March 4, 2021
- City: Tokyo, Japan
- Venue: Nippon Budokan
- Attendance: 3,026

Event chronology
← Previous; Castle Attack	Next → New Japan Cup; Road to Sakura Genesis 2021

NJPW Anniversary Show chronology
← Previous; 48th	Next → 50th

The NJPW 49th Anniversary Show was a professional wrestling event promoted by New Japan Pro-Wrestling (NJPW). The event took place on March 4, 2021 in Tokyo, Japan at the Nippon Budokan arena.

The event featured six matches, including the start of the annual New Japan Cup. In the main event match, Kota Ibushi defeated the IWGP Junior Heavyweight Champion El Desperado to retain his IWGP Heavyweight and IWGP Intercontinental Championships and become the first IWGP World Heavyweight Champion.

== Production ==
Other on-screen personnel
Role:	Name:
English Commentators	Kevin Kelly
English Commentators	Chris Charlton
English Commentators	Rocky Romero
Japanese Commentators	Shinpei Nogami
Japanese Commentators	Milano Collection A.T.
Japanese Commentators	Katsuhiko Kanazawa
Japanese Commentators	Kazuyoshi Sakai
Japanese Commentators	Togi Makabe
Japanese Commentators	Miki Motoi
Japanese Commentators	Jushin Thunder Liger
Japanese Commentators	Masahiro Chono
Ring announcers	Makoto Abe
Ring announcers	Kimihiko Ozaki
Referees	Kenta Sato
Referees	Marty Asami
Referees	Red Shoes Unno

=== Background ===
NJPW was founded by Antonio Inoki on January 13, 1972 after his departure from the Japan Pro Wrestling Alliance promotion. The first NJPW event, titled Opening Series, took place on March 6, 1972, in the Ota Ward Gymnasium in Tokyo, to a crowd of 5,000. The NJPW Anniversary Show has since been held annually in the first week of March to celebrate the anniversary of the company, starting with the 40th Anniversary Show in 2012.

Since 2020, NJPW has been unable to run events with a full arena capacity due to COVID-19 restrictions. The 49th Anniversary Show continued this policy.

=== Storylines ===
The NJPW 49th Anniversary Show featured professional wrestling matches that involve different wrestlers from pre-existing scripted feuds and storylines. Wrestlers portray villains, heroes, or less distinguishable characters in the scripted events that build tension and culminate in a wrestling match or series of matches.

After Kota Ibushi defeated Tetsuya Naito at Castle Attack, he was confronted by the IWGP Junior Heavyweight Champion El Desperado. A match between the two wrestlers was later signed for the Anniversary Show. While the Anniversary Show traditionally features a non-title match between the IWGP Heavyweight Champion and the current IWGP Junior Heavyweight Champion, it was announced that Kota Ibushi vs. El Desperado will be a title match for Ibushi's IWGP Heavyweight and IWGP Intercontinental Championships while also crowning the first IWGP World Heavyweight Champion.

== Results ==
No.	Results	Stipulations	Times
1	Master Wato, Gabriel Kidd, Tomoaki Honma and Hirooki Goto defeated Suzuki-gun (Douki, Zack Sabre Jr., Minoru Suzuki and Taichi)	Eight-man tag team match	10:39
2	Bullet Club (Taiji Ishimori, Jay White, Chase Owens, Kenta and Evil) defeated Taguchi Japan (Ryusuke Taguchi, Toa Henare, David Finlay, Juice Robinson and Hiroshi Tanahashi)	Ten-man tag team match	7:39
3	Chaos (Sho, Tomohiro Ishii and Kazuchika Okada) defeated Los Ingobernables de Japón (Bushi, Sanada and Shingo Takagi)	Six-man tag team match	9:13
4	Jeff Cobb defeated Satoshi Kojima	Singles match New Japan Cup first round match	11:50
5	Great-O-Khan defeated Tetsuya Naito by referee stoppage	Singles match New Japan Cup first round match	20:20
6	Kota Ibushi (c) defeated El Desperado	Singles match for the IWGP Heavyweight Championship and IWGP Intercontinental Championship; Both titles were unified; Ibushi was crowned the inaugural IWGP World Heavyweight Champion immediately after the match.	20:36
(c) / – the champion(s) heading into the match

== See also ==
- 2021 in professional wrestling
- List of major NJPW events
