= NJPW 50th Anniversary Show =

Professional wrestling event

- Promotion: New Japan Pro-Wrestling
- Date: March 1, 2022
- City: Tokyo, Japan
- Venue: Nippon Budokan
- Attendance: 3,182

Event chronology
← Previous; Wrestle Kingdom 16; New Years Golden Series	Next → New Japan Cup; Lonestar Shootout 2022

NJPW Anniversary Show chronology
← Previous; 49th	Next → 51st

The NJPW 50th Anniversary Show was a professional wrestling event promoted by New Japan Pro-Wrestling (NJPW). The event took place on March 1, 2022, in Tokyo, Japan at the Nippon Budokan. The event was to commemorate the fiftieth anniversary of the promotion, which was founded in 1972 by Antonio Inoki.

== Production ==
Other on-screen personnel
Role:	Name:
English Commentators	Kevin Kelly
English Commentators	Chris Charlton
Japanese Commentators	Shinpei Nogami
Japanese Commentators	Milano Collection A.T.
Japanese Commentators	Katsuhiko Kanazawa
Japanese Commentators	Kazuyoshi Sakai
Japanese Commentators	Masahiro Chono
Japanese Commentators	Riki Choshu
Ring announcers	Makoto Abe
Ring announcers	Taisei Watanabe
Ring announcers	Kero Tanaka (main event)
Referees	Kenta Sato
Referees	Marty Asami
Referees	Norio Honaga (match 5)
Referees	Red Shoes Unno

=== Background ===
On November 15, 2021, NJPW announced that the promotion would hold its fiftieth anniversary show at Nippon Budokan on March 1 of the following year. Kota Ibushi and Hiroyoshi Tenzan were originally scheduled to take part in the event, but both pulled out due to injuries.

NJPW legends Minoru Tanaka, Shiro Koshinaka, Norio Honaga, Tatsumi Fujinami, and Yoshiaki Fujiwara took part in several matches at the event. Along with the aforementioned legends; Wataru Inoue, Jushin Liger, Kuniaki Kobayashi, Seiji Sakaguchi, Tiger Hattori, Motoyuki Kitazawa, Milano Collection A.T., Masahito Kakihara, Kazuo Yamazaki, Akira Maeda, Kengo Kimura, Masahiro Chono, Keiji Mutoh, and Riki Choshu took part of the pre-show with Chono and Choshu also providing Japanese commentary for the event. Former ring announcer Kero Tanaka, was the special guest announcer for the main event.

=== Storylines ===
The NJPW 50th Anniversary Show features professional wrestling matches that involve different wrestlers from pre-existing scripted feuds and storylines. Wrestlers portray villains, heroes, or less distinguishable characters in the scripted events that build tension and culminate in a wrestling match or series of matches.

== Results ==
No.	Results	Stipulations	Times
1	House of Torture (Evil, Yujiro Takahashi, and Sho) defeated Tiger Mask, Yoh, and Ryohei Oiwa by pinfall	Six-man tag team match	6:35
2	Bullet Club (Bad Luck Fale, Taiji Ishimori, and El Phantasmo) defeated Suzuki-gun (Taichi and Taka Michinoku) and Minoru Tanaka by pinfall	Six-man tag team match	9:50
3	#StrongHearts (Cima, T-Hawk, and El Lindaman) defeated Suzuki-gun (El Desperado, Yoshinobu Kanemaru, and Douki) by pinfall	Six-man tag team match	9:22
4	United Empire (Great-O-Khan, Will Ospreay, Jeff Cobb, and Aaron Henare) defeated Satoshi Kojima, Yuji Nagata, Kosei Fujita, and Yuto Nakashima by pinfall	Eight-man tag team match	9:20
5	Los Ingobernables de Japon (Sanada, Tetsuya Naito, Shingo Takagi, Bushi, and Hiromu Takahashi) defeated Great Bash Heel (Togi Makabe and Tomoaki Honma), Chaos (Tomohiro Ishii and Toru Yano), and Shiro Koshinaka by pinfall	Ten-man tag team match with Norio Honaga as special guest referee	12:38
6	Bishamon (Hirooki Goto and Yoshi-Hashi) (IWGP Tag Team) defeated Six or Nine (Ryusuke Taguchi and Master Wato) (IWGP Junior Heavyweight Tag Team) by pinfall	Champion vs. Champion tag team match	15:04
7	Kazuchika Okada, Hiroshi Tanahashi, and Tatsumi Fujinami defeated Suzuki-gun (Zack Sabre Jr. and Minoru Suzuki), and Yoshiaki Fujiwara by pinfall	Six-man tag team match	18:12

== See also ==
- 2022 in professional wrestling
- List of major NJPW events
