= Lonestar Shootout (2022) =

2022 New Japan Pro-Wrestling event

- Promotional poster of the event
- Promotion: New Japan Pro-Wrestling
- Brand: NJPW Strong
- Date: April 1, 2022 (Night 2: Aired May 7, 2022)
- City: Dallas, Texas
- Venue: Farimont Hotel
- Attendance: 582

Event chronology
| ← Previous; NJPW 50th Anniversary Show | Next → Hyper Battle '22 |

Lonestar Shootout chronology
| ← Previous; First | Next → 2023 |

Lonestar Shootout (2022) was a two-night (Note: The second show was recorded on the same date and in front of the same audience but aired later as an episode of NJPW Strong.) professional wrestling event promoted by New Japan Pro-Wrestling (NJPW). It took place on April 1, 2022 at the Farimont Dallas Hotel in Dallas, Texas in conjunction with WrestleCon during WrestleMania 38 weekend and was streamed live as a pay-per-view event on FITE TV with the second part airing on tape delay on May 7 as an episode of NJPW's weekly show NJPW Strong. The event was promoted as part of New Japan Pro-Wrestling of America (NJoA)'s Strong brand.

== Storylines ==
Lonestar Shootout featured five professional wrestling matches on each show that involved different wrestlers from pre-existing scripted feuds and storylines. Wrestlers portray villains, heroes, or less distinguishable characters in the scripted events that build tension and culminate in a wrestling match or series of matches.

== Night 1 ==
=== Event ===
The event started with the singles confrontation between Rocky Romero and Ren Narita, solded with the victory of the latter. Next up, Clark Connors, Karl Fredericks, Máscara Dorada and Yuya Uemura outmatched David Finlay, Juice Robinson, Daniel Garcia and Kevin Knight in eight-man tag team action. In the third bout, Minoru Suzuki defeated Killer Kross in singles competition. In the semi main event, Bullet Club leader Jay White picked up a victory over Mike Bailey in one of his open challenge series of matches.

In the main event, Tomohiro Ishii defeated Chris Dickinson in singles competition.

April 1
| No. | Results | Stipulations | Times |
|---|---|---|---|
| 1 | Ren Narita defeated Rocky Romero | Singles match | 7:42 |
| 2 | Clark Connors, Karl Fredericks, Máscara Dorada and Yuya Uemura defeated FinJuice (David Finlay and Juice Robinson), Daniel Garcia and Kevin Knight | Eight-man tag team match | 10:45 |
| 3 | Minoru Suzuki defeated Killer Kross | Singles match | 9:48 |
| 4 | Jay White defeated Mike Bailey | "U-S-of-Jay" open challenge series | 14:10 |
| 5 | Tomohiro Ishii defeated Chris Dickinson | Singles match | 16:11 |

== Night 2 ==
Matches recorded on April 1, 2022 at Fairmont Hotel. Aired May 7, 2022.
| No. | Results | Stipulations | Times |
|---|---|---|---|
| 1 | Bullet Club (Chris Bey and Hikuleo) defeated Stray Dog Army (Barrett Brown and Bateman) | Tag team match | 12:16 |
| 2 | Jonah defeated Blake Christian | Singles match | 6:56 |
| 3 | Team Filthy (J. R. Kratos, Royce Isaacs and Tom Lawlor) defeated Fred Rosser, Alex Coughlin and The DKC | Six-man tag team match | 11:12 |
