= New Japan Cup =

- New Japan Cup
- Promotions: NJPW
- First event: New Japan Cup (2005)
- Event gimmick: Single-elimination tournament for a championship match

The New Japan Cup (NJC) is an annual single-elimination professional wrestling tournament held by New Japan Pro-Wrestling (NJPW) since 2005. It is considered the second most prominent heavyweight tournament in NJPW, after the G1 Climax which follows a round-robin format.

Since the 2006 edition, the winner of the tournament, like with the G1 Climax, would receive a championship match, originally, for the IWGP Heavyweight Championship. However, unlike with the G1 Climax, the reigning IWGP Heavyweight Champion could not participate in the tournament (in the case of the champion winning the G1 Climax, he would get to pick the next challenger for his title). In 2014–2018, the winner could choose to challenge for the IWGP Intercontinental Championship instead, while in 2015–2018, the NEVER Openweight Championship was also an option; only the 2014 winner Shinsuke Nakamura chose not to compete for the Heavyweight Championship, challenging for the Intercontinental Championship instead. In 2020, due to Tetsuya Naito being both the Heavyweight and Intercontinental Champion, the winner received a match for both titles, and in 2021, after the Heavyweight and Intercontinental Championships were unified into a new championship, the IWGP World Heavyweight Championship, the latter became the title the winner of the New Japan Cup would automatically challenge for; like previously with the Heavyweight title, the World Heavyweight Champion cannot compete. However, in 2022, it was once again an openweight tournament and featured all the champions from both the heavyweight and junior heavyweight divisions including the IWGP World Heavyweight Champion. The first night of the 2022 tournament saw the IWGP World Heavyweight Champion take on the IWGP Junior Heavyweight Champion in the first round, a match that usually happens at NJPW's anniversary event.

The number of participants in the New Japan Cup has varied over the years, from a lowest of 14 in 2007 and 2009 to a highest of 48 in 2022; the 2021 tournament features 30 entrants. It is considered a heavyweight tournament, although the 2005, 2008–09, 2020, and 2022 editions were openweight tournaments instead, also featuring junior heavyweights; in 2020, NJPW premiered the New Japan Cup USA, a version of the tournament taking place in the United States to determine a contender for the IWGP United States Heavyweight Championship.

Hiroshi Tanahashi is both the inaugural winner of the New Japan Cup, and the first wrestler to have won it twice; Hirooki Goto, Yuji Nagata, Kazuchika Okada, and Zack Sabre Jr. have since also become two-time winners. Goto is both the only three-time winner and the only person to have won the tournament two years in a row.

== Tournament finals ==
#	Event	Date	City	Venue	Attendance	Final
1	New Japan Cup: New Japan Openweight Tournament	April 24, 2005	Osaka	Osaka Prefectural Gymnasium	5,800	Hiroshi Tanahashi vs. Manabu Nakanishi
2	New Japan Cup 2006	April 30, 2006	Amagasaki	Amagasaki Memorial Park Gymnasium	5,200	Yuji Nagata vs. Giant Bernard
3	Circuit 2007 New Japan Evolution: New Japan Cup	March 21, 2007	Tokyo	Korakuen Hall	1,450	Yuji Nagata vs. Togi Makabe
4	Circuit 2008 New Japan Cup: Who Is the Highest	March 23, 2008	Amagasaki	Amagasaki Memorial Park Gymnasium	5,200	Hiroshi Tanahashi vs. Giant Bernard
5	Circuit 2009 New Japan Cup: Soul on the Ring	March 22, 2009	Amagasaki	Amagasaki Memorial Park Gymnasium	5,300	Hirooki Goto vs. Giant Bernard
6	Circuit 2010 New Japan Cup: The Perfect Generalist	March 22, 2010	Amagasaki	Amagasaki Memorial Park Gymnasium	5,500	Togi Makabe vs. Hirooki Goto
7	New Japan Cup 2011	March 20, 2011	Amagasaki	Amagasaki Memorial Park Gymnasium	5,500	Yuji Nagata vs. Shinsuke Nakamura
8	NJPW 40th Anniversary Tour: New Japan Cup 2012	April 8, 2012	Tokyo	Korakuen Hall	2,040	Hiroshi Tanahashi vs. Hirooki Goto
9	New Japan Cup 2013	March 23, 2013	Tokyo	Korakuen Hall	2,015	Hirooki Goto vs. Kazuchika Okada
10	New Japan Cup 2014	March 23, 2014	Amagasaki	Amagasaki Memorial Park Gymnasium	5,800	Shinsuke Nakamura vs. Bad Luck Fale
11	New Japan Cup 2015	March 15, 2015	Hiroshima	Hiroshima Sun Plaza	5,120	Hirooki Goto vs. Kota Ibushi
12	New Japan Cup 2016	March 12, 2016	Aomori	Maeda Arena	2,919	Hirooki Goto vs. Tetsuya Naito
13	New Japan Cup 2017	March 20, 2017	Nagaoka	City Hall Plaza Aore Nagaoka	4,079	Katsuyori Shibata vs. Bad Luck Fale
14	New Japan Cup 2018	March 21, 2018	Nagaoka	City Hall Plaza Aore Nagaoka	3,996	Hiroshi Tanahashi vs. Zack Sabre Jr.
15	New Japan Cup 2019	March 24, 2019	Nagaoka	City Hall Plaza Aore Nagaoka	3,991	Kazuchika Okada vs. Sanada
16	New Japan Cup 2020	July 11, 2020	Osaka	Osaka-jō Hall	3,318	Kazuchika Okada vs. Evil
17	New Japan Cup 2021	March 21, 2021	Sendai	Xebio Arena Sendai	2,299	Shingo Takagi vs. Will Ospreay
18	New Japan Cup 2022	March 27, 2022	Osaka	Osaka-jō Hall	2,987	Tetsuya Naito vs. Zack Sabre Jr.
19	New Japan Cup 2023	March 21, 2023	Nagaoka	City Hall Plaza Aore Nagaoka	3,384	Sanada vs. David Finlay
20	New Japan Cup 2024	March 20, 2024	Nagaoka	City Hall Plaza Aore Nagaoka	3,003	Hirooki Goto vs. Yota Tsuji
21	New Japan Cup 2025	March 20, 2025	Nagaoka	City Hall Plaza Aore Nagaoka	3,271	David Finlay vs. Shota Umino
22	New Japan Cup 2026	March 21, 2026	Nagaoka	City Hall Plaza Aore Nagaoka	3,007	Yuya Uemura vs. Callum Newman

== Tournaments ==
Year	Tournament			Aftermath		
Year	Winner	Times won	Participants	Challenged for	Match	Result
2005	Hiroshi Tanahashi	1	16	—N/a		
2006	Giant Bernard	1	16	IWGP Heavyweight Championship	vs. Brock Lesnar at New Japan Cup 2006 Special	Lost
2007	Yuji Nagata	1	14	IWGP Heavyweight Championship	vs. Hiroshi Tanahashi at 35th Anniversary Tour: Circuit 2007 New Japan Brave	Won
2008	Hiroshi Tanahashi	2	16	IWGP Heavyweight Championship	vs. Shinsuke Nakamura at New Dimension	Lost
2009	Hirooki Goto	1	14	IWGP Heavyweight Championship	vs. Hiroshi Tanahashi at Wrestling Dontaku	Lost
2010	Hirooki Goto	2	15	IWGP Heavyweight Championship	vs. Shinsuke Nakamura at New Dimension	Lost
2011	Yuji Nagata	2	16	IWGP Heavyweight Championship	vs. Hiroshi Tanahashi at New Dimension	Lost
2012	Hirooki Goto	3	16	IWGP Heavyweight Championship	vs. Kazuchika Okada at Wrestling Dontaku	Lost
2013	Kazuchika Okada	1	16	IWGP Heavyweight Championship	vs. Hiroshi Tanahashi at Invasion Attack	Won
2014	Shinsuke Nakamura	1	16	IWGP Intercontinental Championship	vs. Hiroshi Tanahashi at Invasion Attack	Won
2015	Kota Ibushi	1	16	IWGP Heavyweight Championship	vs. A.J. Styles at Invasion Attack	Lost
2016	Tetsuya Naito	1	16	IWGP Heavyweight Championship	vs. Kazuchika Okada at Invasion Attack	Won
2017	Katsuyori Shibata	1	16	IWGP Heavyweight Championship	vs. Kazuchika Okada at Sakura Genesis	Lost
2018	Zack Sabre Jr.	1	16	IWGP Heavyweight Championship	vs. Kazuchika Okada at Sakura Genesis	Lost
2019	Kazuchika Okada	2	32	IWGP Heavyweight Championship	vs. Jay White at G1 Supercard	Won
2020	Evil	1	32	IWGP Heavyweight Championship & IWGP Intercontinental Championship	vs. Tetsuya Naito at Dominion in Osaka-jo Hall	Won
2021	Will Ospreay	1	30	IWGP World Heavyweight Championship	vs. Kota Ibushi at Sakura Genesis	Won
2022	Zack Sabre Jr.	2	48	IWGP World Heavyweight Championship	vs. Kazuchika Okada at Hyper Battle '22	Lost
2023	Sanada	1	24	IWGP World Heavyweight Championship	vs. Kazuchika Okada at Sakura Genesis	Won
2024	Yota Tsuji	1	28	IWGP World Heavyweight Championship	vs. Tetsuya Naito at Sakura Genesis	Lost
2025	David Finlay	1	24	IWGP World Heavyweight Championship	vs. Hirooki Goto at Sakura Genesis	Lost
2026	Callum Newman	1	24	IWGP Heavyweight Championship	vs. Yota Tsuji at Sakura Genesis	Won

== Results ==
=== 2005 ===
New Japan Cup 2005
- Promotion: New Japan Pro-Wrestling
- Date: April 19–24, 2005
- City: Various, Japan; Final: Osaka, Osaka, Japan
- Venue: Various; Final: Osaka Prefectural Gymnasium

New Japan Cup chronology
← Previous —	Next → 2006

The 2005 New Japan Cup was held from April 19 to April 24. The first two rounds were held on individual nights, with round one taking up the entire card on April 19.

Round 1 April 19
Hiroshi Tanahashi	DQ
Yuji Nagata	24:12
Koji Kanemoto	Pin
Ryushi Yanagisawa	8:19
Minoru	CO
Osamu Nishimura	16:47
Hiroyoshi Tenzan	Pin
Jushin Thunder Liger	15:54
Kendo Kashin	Pin
Shinsuke Nakamura	8:55
Yutaka Yoshie	Pin
Scott Norton	9:07
Tiger Mask	Pin
Masahiro Chono	10:29
Hirooki Goto	Pin
Manabu Nakanishi	7:34

Round 2 April 21
Hiroshi Tanahashi	Pin
Koji Kanemoto	17:38
Osamu Nishimura†	Sub
Hiroyoshi Tenzan	20:47
Kendo Kashin	Pin
Yutaka Yoshie	15:48
Masahiro Chono	Pin
Manabu Nakanishi	14:16

Semifinals; April 24
Hiroshi Tanahashi	Pin
Hiroyoshi Tenzan	19:45
Kendo Kashin	Pin
Manabu Nakanishi	10:20

Final; April 24
Hiroshi Tanahashi	Pin
Manabu Nakanishi	19:21

† Minoru was forced to pull out before his Round 2 match, due to suffering severe dizziness, and was replaced by Osamu Nishimura, who he beat in Round 1.

=== 2006 ===
New Japan Cup 2006
- Promotion: New Japan Pro-Wrestling
- Date: April 16–30, 2006
- City: Various, Japan; Final: Amagasaki, Hyogo, Japan
- Venue: Various; Final: Memorial Park Gymnasium

New Japan Cup chronology
← Previous; 2005	Next → 2007

The 2006 New Japan Cup was held from April 16 to April 30. Giant Bernard, the winner of the tournament, went on to fail in his challenge against IWGP Champion Brock Lesnar on May 3.

Round 1 April 16, 20, 21, 22
Giant Bernard	Pin
Toru Yano	8:19
Black Strong Machine	Pin
Riki Choshu	6:46
Manabu Nakanishi	Pin
Takashi Iizuka	11:31
Ryoji Sai	Pin
Naofumi Yamamoto	13:59
Hiroshi Tanahashi	Pin
Masahiro Chono	25:12
Hiroyoshi Tenzan	Pin
Scott Norton	12:30
Togi Makabe	Pin
Tatsutoshi Goto	1:24
Yuji Nagata	Pin
Tomohiro Ishii	9:57

Round 2 April 23,25,26
Giant Bernard	Pin
Riki Choshu	9:11
Manabu Nakanishi	Pin
Ryoji Sai	14:56
Hiroshi Tanahashi	Pin
Hiroyoshi Tenzan	14:27
Togi Makabe	Pin
Yuji Nagata	10:50

Semifinals; April 28,29
Giant Bernard	Pin
Manabu Nakanishi	16:43
Hiroshi Tanahashi	Pin
Yuji Nagata	18:49

Final; April 30
Giant Bernard	Pin
Yuji Nagata	19:40

=== 2007 ===
New Japan Cup 2007
- Promotion: New Japan Pro-Wrestling
- Date: March 3–21, 2007
- City: Various, Japan; Final: Tokyo, Japan
- Venue: Various; Final: Korakuen Hall

New Japan Cup chronology
← Previous; 2006	Next → 2008

The 2007 New Japan Cup was a 14-man tournament held from March 3 to March 21. Giant Bernard and Hiroyoshi Tenzan received byes to the second round, due to their victories in the 2006 New Japan Cup and G1 Climax respectively. Shinsuke Nakamura was injured in a non-tournament match on March 13, giving Tenzan an additional pass to the semifinals. The winner, Yuji Nagata, went on to defeat Hiroshi Tanahashi for the championship on April 13, beginning his second reign with the title. He also became the first person to reach the NJC final twice, and the first to win both the New Japan Cup and G1 Climax.

Round 1 March 3, 4, 9, 10, 11
Togi Makabe	Pin
Travis Tomko	9:29
Tomoaki Honma	Sub
Takashi Iizuka	14:06
Shinsuke Nakamura	Pin
Toru Yano	10:16
Tomohiro Ishii	Pin
Yuji Nagata	12:12
Masahiro Chono	Pin
Riki Choshu	8:44
Shiro Koshinaka	Pin
Manabu Nakanishi	10:03

Round 2 March 13, 15
Togi Makabe	Pin
Takashi Iizuka	11:32
Shinsuke Nakamura	Forfeit
Hiroyoshi Tenzan	N/A
Yuji Nagata	Pin
Masahiro Chono	17:25
Manabu Nakanishi	Pin
Giant Bernard	13:05

Semifinals; March 18
Togi Makabe	DQ
Hiroyoshi Tenzan	12:27
Yuji Nagata	Sub
Giant Bernard	18:22

Final; March 21
Togi Makabe	Pin
Yuji Nagata	20:05

=== 2008 ===
New Japan Cup 2008
- Promotion: New Japan Pro-Wrestling
- Date: March 9–23, 2008
- City: Various, Japan; Final: Amagasaki, Hyogo, Japan
- Venue: Various; Final: Amagasaki Memorial Park Gymnasium

New Japan Cup chronology
← Previous; 2007	Next → 2009

The 2008 New Japan Cup was a 16-man tournament held from March 9 to March 23. The winner, Hiroshi Tanahashi, became the first two-time winner of the NJC and went on to fail in his challenge against IWGP Champion Shinsuke Nakamura on March 30.

Round 1
Tomohiro Ishii	Sub
Hiroyoshi Tenzan	13:03
Takashi Iizuka	Pin
Togi Makabe	10:27
Hirooki Goto	Pin
Hiroshi Tanahashi	20:32
Jushin Thunder Liger	Pin
Ryusuke Taguchi	11:33
Koji Kanemoto	Sub
Karl Anderson	9:05
Giant Bernard	Pin
Tomoaki Honma	10:43
Milano Collection A.T.	Pin
Toru Yano	11:25
Manabu Nakanishi	Pin
Rhino	10:17

Round 2
Hiroyoshi Tenzan	Pin^{1}
Togi Makabe	18:07
Hiroshi Tanahashi	Pin
Ryusuke Taguchi	13:42
Koji Kanemoto	Pin
Giant Bernard	9:45
Toru Yano	Pin
Rhino	11:21

Semifinals
Togi Makabe	Pin
Hiroshi Tanahashi	12:11
Giant Bernard	Pin
Toru Yano	10:44

Final
Hiroshi Tanahashi	Pin
Giant Bernard	18:24

^{1}This match originally ended in a double countout at 2:35, but it was restarted with Makabe winning via pinfall in 14:49.

=== 2009 ===
New Japan Cup 2009
- Promotion: New Japan Pro-Wrestling
- Date: March 8–22, 2009
- City: Various, Japan; Final: Amagasaki, Hyogo, Japan
- Venue: Various; Final: Amagasaki Memorial Park Gymnasium

New Japan Cup chronology
← Previous; 2008	Next → 2010

The 2009 New Japan Cup was a 14-man tournament held from March 8 to March 22. Giant Bernard and Yuji Nagata, the winners of the Cups of 2006 and 2007, received byes in the first round of the tournament. The eventual winner of the tournament, Hirooki Goto, went on to lose the IWGP Heavyweight Championship match to Hiroshi Tanahashi on May 3 at Wrestling Dontaku 2009.

Round 1 March 8
Hirooki Goto	Sub
Karl Anderson	11:10
Shinsuke Nakamura	Pin
Togi Makabe	15:32
Takashi Iizuka	Pin
Tomoaki Honma	10:53
Milano Collection A.T.	Pin
Toru Yano	09:50
Yutaka Yoshie	Pin
Manabu Nakanishi	20:29
Tomohiro Ishii	CO^{1}
Wataru Inoue	12:33

Round 2 March 15
Hirooki Goto	Pin
Shinsuke Nakamura	19:00
Yuji Nagata	DQ
Takashi Iizuka	14:49
Milano Collection A.T.	Pin
Giant Bernard	9:13
Yutaka Yoshie	Pin
Tomohiro Ishii	13:38

Semifinals; March 22
Hirooki Goto	Sub
Yuji Nagata	14:51
Giant Bernard	Pin
Yutaka Yoshie	08:56

Final; March 22
Hirooki Goto	Sub
Giant Bernard	18:18

^{1}This match originally ended in a double countout at 3:18, but it was restarted with Ishii winning via countout in 9:15.

=== 2010 ===
New Japan Cup 2010
- Promotion: New Japan Pro-Wrestling
- Date: March 14–22, 2010
- City: Various, Japan; Final: Amagasaki, Hyogo, Japan
- Venue: Various; Final: Amagasaki Memorial Park Gymnasium

New Japan Cup chronology
← Previous; 2009	Next → 2011

The 2010 New Japan Cup was a 15-man tournament held from March 14 to March 22. As the previous winner of the Cup, Hirooki Goto received a bye in the first round of the tournament. With his victory, Goto became the second two-time winner of the tournament and the first to win it back-to-back. Goto went on to challenge the IWGP Heavyweight Champion Shinsuke Nakamura on April 4, but would once again fail in his attempt to win the title.

Round 1 March 14
Yujiro Takahashi	Pin
Yuji Nagata	13:41
Wataru Inoue	Pin
Giant Bernard	7:39
Masato Tanaka	Pin
Manabu Nakanishi	18:01
Togi Makabe	Pin
Tomohiro Ishii	11:46
Toru Yano	Pin
Tomoaki Honma	10:34
Hiroshi Tanahashi	Pin
Strong Man	8:37
Tetsuya Naito	Pin
Karl Anderson	9:52

Round 2 March 20
Hirooki Goto	Pin
Yujiro Takahashi	15:04
Wataru Inoue	Pin
Masato Tanaka	13:05
Togi Makabe	Pin
Toru Yano	14:26
Hiroshi Tanahashi	Pin
Tetsuya Naito	23:17

Semifinals; March 22
Hirooki Goto	Pin
Masato Tanaka	11:15
Togi Makabe	Pin
Tetsuya Naito	15:52

Final; March 22
Hirooki Goto	Pin
Togi Makabe	21:42

=== 2011 ===
New Japan Cup 2011
- Promotion: New Japan Pro-Wrestling
- Date: March 6–20, 2011
- City: Various, Japan; Final: Amagasaki, Hyogo, Japan
- Venue: Various; Final: Amagasaki Memorial Park Gymnasium

New Japan Cup chronology
← Previous; 2010	Next → 2012

The 2011 New Japan Cup was a 16-man tournament held from March 6 to March 20. The winner, Yuji Nagata, went on to unsuccessfully challenge Hiroshi Tanahashi for the IWGP Heavyweight Championship on April 3.

Round 1 March 6 March 13
Manabu Nakanishi	Pin
Yujiro Takahashi	9:50
Hirooki Goto	Pin
Shinsuke Nakamura	13:45
Karl Anderson	Sub
MVP	12:20
Togi Makabe	Pin
Satoshi Kojima	16:01
Wataru Inoue	Pin
Toru Yano	10:17
Hiroyoshi Tenzan	Sub
Takashi Iizuka	12:50
Tetsuya Naito	Pin
Masato Tanaka	13:03
Yuji Nagata	Pin
Giant Bernard	11:32

Round 2 March 19
Manabu Nakanishi	Pin
Shinsuke Nakamura	8:49
MVP	Pin
Togi Makabe	10:41
Toru Yano	Pin
Hiroyoshi Tenzan	11:09
Masato Tanaka	Pin
Yuji Nagata	16:33

Semifinals; March 20
Shinsuke Nakamura	Pin
Togi Makabe	9:55
Toru Yano	Sub
Yuji Nagata	7:27

Final; March 20
Shinsuke Nakamura	Pin
Yuji Nagata	14:44

=== 2012 ===
New Japan Cup 2012
- Promotion: New Japan Pro-Wrestling
- Date: April 1–8, 2012
- City: Various, Japan; Final: Tokyo, Japan
- Venue: Various; Final: Korakuen Hall

New Japan Cup chronology
← Previous; 2011	Next → 2013

The 2012 New Japan Cup was a 16-man tournament held from April 1 to April 8. With his win, Hirooki Goto, became the first three-time winner of the tournament.

Round 1 April 1
Hiroshi Tanahashi	Pin
Toru Yano	17:25
Satoshi Kojima	Pin
Tetsuya Naito	17:53
Hiroyoshi Tenzan	Pin
Karl Anderson	8:00
MVP	Pin
Shinsuke Nakamura	9:45
Togi Makabe	Pin
Lance Archer	8:47
Yuji Nagata	Pin
Minoru Suzuki	15:31
Hirooki Goto	Pin
Yujiro Takahashi	9:55
La Sombra	Pin
Yoshi-Hashi	9:41

Round 2 April 5
Hiroshi Tanahashi	Pin
Tetsuya Naito	18:21
Karl Anderson	Pin
Shinsuke Nakamura	15:22
Togi Makabe	Pin
Minoru Suzuki	13:34
Hirooki Goto	Pin
La Sombra	9:51

Semifinals; April 8
Hiroshi Tanahashi	Pin
Karl Anderson	12:36
Togi Makabe	Pin
Hirooki Goto	9:22

Final; April 8
Hiroshi Tanahashi	Pin
Hirooki Goto	25:25

=== 2013 ===
New Japan Cup 2013
- Promotion: New Japan Pro-Wrestling
- Date: March 11–23, 2013
- City: Various, Japan; Final: Tokyo, Japan
- Venue: Various; Final: Korakuen Hall

New Japan Cup chronology
← Previous; 2012	Next → 2014

The 2013 New Japan Cup was a 16-man tournament held from March 11 to March 23. The winner of the tournament, Kazuchika Okada, went on to defeat Hiroshi Tanahashi for the IWGP Heavyweight Championship at Invasion Attack on April 7.

Round 1 March 11
Togi Makabe	Pin
Yujiro Takahashi	10:45
Shinsuke Nakamura	Pin
Davey Boy Smith Jr.	13:06
Satoshi Kojima	Pin
Tomohiro Ishii	13:37
Hirooki Goto	Pin
Tama Tonga	9:37
Hiroyoshi Tenzan	Pin
Karl Anderson	8:42
Kazuchika Okada	Sub
Lance Archer	10:14
Yuji Nagata	Pin
Minoru Suzuki	10:24
Manabu Nakanishi	Pin
Toru Yano	6:18

Round 2 March 17
Yujiro Takahashi	Pin
Davey Boy Smith Jr.	11:43
Tomohiro Ishii	Pin
Hirooki Goto	18:46
Karl Anderson	Pin
Kazuchika Okada	15:27
Minoru Suzuki	Pin
Toru Yano	10:14

Semifinals; March 23
Davey Boy Smith Jr.	Pin
Hirooki Goto	8:14
Kazuchika Okada	Sub
Toru Yano	10:42

Final; March 23
Hirooki Goto	Pin
Kazuchika Okada	23:52

=== 2014 ===
New Japan Cup 2014
- Promotion: New Japan Pro-Wrestling
- Date: March 15–23, 2014
- City: Various, Japan; Final: Amagasaki, Hyogo, Japan
- Venue: Various; Final: Amagasaki Memorial Park Gymnasium

New Japan Cup chronology
← Previous; 2013	Next → 2015

The 2014 New Japan Cup took place between March 15 and 23. The winner of the tournament got to choose whether to challenge for the IWGP Heavyweight or the IWGP Intercontinental Championship.

Round 1 March 15
Togi Makabe	Pin
Bad Luck Fale	9:36
Tetsuya Naito	Pin
Tomohiro Ishii	12:55
Katsuyori Shibata	Sub
Karl Anderson	9:14
Yujiro Takahashi	Pin
Shelton X Benjamin	6:21
Hirooki Goto	Pin
Doc Gallows	6:59
Toru Yano	Pin
Minoru Suzuki	8:01
Shinsuke Nakamura	Pin
Davey Boy Smith Jr.	14:59
Prince Devitt	Pin
Lance Archer	7:57

Round 2 March 22
Bad Luck Fale	Pin
Tetsuya Naito	11:29
Katsuyori Shibata	Pin
Shelton X Benjamin	10:06
Hirooki Goto	Pin
Minoru Suzuki	12:27
Shinsuke Nakamura	Pin
Prince Devitt	10:23

Semifinals; March 23
Bad Luck Fale	Pin
Shelton X Benjamin	4:13
Minoru Suzuki	Pin
Shinsuke Nakamura	13:12

Final; March 23
Bad Luck Fale	Pin
Shinsuke Nakamura	15:20

=== 2015 ===
New Japan Cup 2015
- Promotion: New Japan Pro-Wrestling
- Date: March 5–15, 2015
- City: Various, Japan; Final: Hiroshima, Hiroshima, Japan
- Venue: Various; Final: Hiroshima Sun Plaza

New Japan Cup chronology
← Previous; 2014	Next → 2016

The 2015 New Japan Cup took place between March 5 and 15. The winner of the tournament got to choose whether to challenge for the IWGP Heavyweight, IWGP Intercontinental or the NEVER Openweight Championship at Invasion Attack 2015 on April 5.

Round 1 March 5
Hiroshi Tanahashi	Pin
Toru Yano	2:47
Kota Ibushi	Pin
Doc Gallows	8:49
Tetsuya Naito	Pin
Karl Anderson	12:10
Kazuchika Okada	Pin
Bad Luck Fale	16:34
Togi Makabe	Pin
Tomoaki Honma	10:10
Yoshi-Hashi	Pin
Yujiro Takahashi	8:02
Yuji Nagata	Pin
Hirooki Goto	11:24
Satoshi Kojima	Pin
Katsuyori Shibata	8:53

Round 2 March 8
Toru Yano	Pin
Kota Ibushi	2:44
Tetsuya Naito	Pin
Bad Luck Fale	12:51
Togi Makabe	Pin
Yujiro Takahashi	10:13
Hirooki Goto	Pin
Katsuyori Shibata	17:18

Semifinals; March 15
Kota Ibushi	Pin
Tetsuya Naito	14:14
Togi Makabe	Pin
Hirooki Goto	8:11

Final; March 15
Kota Ibushi	Pin
Hirooki Goto	17:31

=== 2016 ===
New Japan Cup 2016
- Promotion: New Japan Pro-Wrestling
- Date: March 3–12, 2016
- City: Various, Japan; Final: Aomori, Aomori, Japan
- Venue: Various; Final: New Aomori Prefecture Sports Park Maeda Arena

Event chronology
← Previous; Lion's Gate Project 1	Next → Road To Invasion Attack

New Japan Cup chronology
← Previous; 2015	Next → 2017

The 2016 New Japan Cup took place between March 3 and 12. The winner of the tournament would once again get to choose whether to challenge for the IWGP Heavyweight, IWGP Intercontinental or NEVER Openweight Championship at Invasion Attack 2016 on April 10.

Round 1 March 3
Hiroshi Tanahashi	Pin
Bad Luck Fale	13:55
Hiroyoshi Tenzan	Pin
Michael Elgin	8:22
Togi Makabe	Pin
Tama Tonga	7:40
Yuji Nagata	Pin
Hirooki Goto	11:28
Tomoaki Honma	Pin
Satoshi Kojima	11:50
Toru Yano	CO
Yujiro Takahashi	1:13
Tomohiro Ishii	Pin
Evil	15:20
Yoshi-Hashi	Pin
Tetsuya Naito	13:42

Round 2 March 4
Bad Luck Fale	Pin
Michael Elgin	10:10
Tama Tonga	Pin
Hirooki Goto	9:24
Satoshi Kojima	Pin
Toru Yano	5:41
Tomohiro Ishii	Pin
Tetsuya Naito	16:21

Semifinals; March 12
Michael Elgin	Pin
Hirooki Goto	9:28
Toru Yano	Pin
Tetsuya Naito	2:32

Final; March 12
Hirooki Goto	Pin
Tetsuya Naito	20:15

=== 2017 ===
New Japan Cup 2017
- Promotion: New Japan Pro-Wrestling
- Date: March 11–20, 2017
- City: Various, Japan; Final: Nagaoka, Niigata, Japan
- Venue: Various; Final: Aore Nagaoka

Event chronology
← Previous; Anniversary Show	Next → Road To Sakura Genesis 2017

New Japan Cup chronology
← Previous; 2016	Next → 2018

The 2017 New Japan Cup took place between March 11 and 20. Unlike previous years, this tournament was held across eight events in 10 days. Tomoaki Honma was originally announced for the tournament, but was pulled out and replaced with Yuji Nagata after suffering a spinal cord injury.

Round 1 March 11, 12
Hiroshi Tanahashi	Pin
Evil	22:55
Yuji Nagata	Pin
Tanga Loa	11:45
Michael Elgin	Pin
Bad Luck Fale	10:32
Toru Yano	Pin
Tama Tonga	3:46
Katsuyori Shibata	Pin
Minoru Suzuki	19:44
Juice Robinson	Pin
Yujiro Takahashi	10:21
Tomohiro Ishii	Pin
Kenny Omega	29:45
Yoshi-Hashi	Sub
Sanada	13:57

Round 2 March 13, 14, 15, 17
Evil	Pin
Yuji Nagata	13:33
Bad Luck Fale	Pin
Toru Yano	8:33
Katsuyori Shibata	Pin
Juice Robinson	11:23
Tomohiro Ishii	Pin
Sanada	14:02

Semifinals; March 19
Evil	Pin
Bad Luck Fale	12:20
Katsuyori Shibata	Sub
Tomohiro Ishii	22:32

Final; March 20
Bad Luck Fale	Pin
Katsuyori Shibata	18:48

=== 2018 ===
New Japan Cup 2018
- Promotion: New Japan Pro-Wrestling
- Date: March 9–21, 2018
- City: Various, Japan; Final: Nagaoka, Niigata, Japan
- Venue: Various; Final: Aore Nagaoka

Event chronology
← Previous; Anniversary Show	Next → Strong Style Evolved

New Japan Cup chronology
← Previous; 2017	Next → 2019

The 2018 New Japan Cup took place between March 9 and 21. The winner of the tournament, Zack Sabre Jr., challenged Kazuchika Okada for the IWGP Heavyweight Championship. Sabre also became the second non-Japanese wrestler, after Giant Bernard, to win the New Japan Cup.

Round 1 March 9, 10, 11, 12
Michael Elgin	Pin
Tomohiro Ishii	29:02
Juice Robinson	Pin
Yujiro Takahashi	16:08
Hiroshi Tanahashi	Pin
Taichi	23:53
Bad Luck Fale	Pin
Lance Archer	11:02
Yoshi-Hashi	Pin
Kota Ibushi	22:23
Tetsuya Naito	Sub
Zack Sabre Jr.	22:43
Toru Yano	12:52
Davey Boy Smith Jr.	CO
Chuckie T.	Pin
Sanada	21:31

Round 2 March 14, 15
Michael Elgin	Pin
Juice Robinson	17:04
Hiroshi Tanahashi	CO
Bad Luck Fale	14:36
Kota Ibushi	Stop
Zack Sabre Jr.	21:02
Toru Yano	Sub
Sanada	4:51

Semifinals; March 16, 18
Juice Robinson	Pin
Hiroshi Tanahashi	29:53
Zack Sabre Jr.	Sub
Sanada	26:36

Final; March 21
Hiroshi Tanahashi	Sub
Zack Sabre Jr.	34:02

=== 2019 ===
New Japan Cup 2019
- Promotion: New Japan Pro-Wrestling
- Date: March 8–24, 2019
- City: Various, Japan; Final: Nagaoka, Niigata, Japan
- Venue: Various; Final: Aore Nagaoka

Event chronology
← Previous; Anniversary Show	Next → G1 Supercard

New Japan Cup chronology
← Previous; 2018	Next → 2020

The 2019 New Japan Cup took place between March 8 and 24. Unlike the previous year, the tournament featured 32 wrestlers instead of 16 and marks the New Japan Cup debut of 7 wrestlers. After David Finlay was pulled out of the tournament due to an injury, Ryusuke Taguchi was announced as his replacement.

Round 1 March 8, 9, 10, 11
Yuji Nagata	21:34
Tomohiro Ishii	Pin
Tomoaki Honma	17:54
Taichi	Sub
Manabu Nakanishi	12:26
Yoshi-Hashi	Sub
Juice Robinson	24:36
Chase Owens	Pin
Kazuchika Okada	Pin
Michael Elgin	24:06
Mikey Nicholls	Pin
Hikuleo	08:55
Will Ospreay	Pin
Bad Luck Fale	11:30
Toa Henare	11:11
Lance Archer	Pin
Hiroshi Tanahashi	Sub
Shota Umino	16:48
Hiroyoshi Tenzan	12:08
Ryusuke Taguchi	Pin
Kota Ibushi	Pin
Tetsuya Naito	20:38
Evil	15:33
Zack Sabre Jr.	Sub
Togi Makabe	07:26
Colt Cabana	Pin
Toru Yano	Pin
Davey Boy Smith Jr.	05:30
Satoshi Kojima	13:43
Minoru Suzuki	Pin
Hirooki Goto	20:47
Sanada	Pin

Round 2 March 13, 14, 16, 17
Tomohiro Ishii	Pin
Taichi	22:55
Yoshi-Hashi	Pin
Chase Owens	14:10
Kazuchika Okada	Pin
Mikey Nicholls	17:25
Will Ospreay	Pin
Lance Archer	18:08
Hiroshi Tanahashi	Pin
Ryusuke Taguchi	17:18
Kota Ibushi	16:07
Zack Sabre Jr.	Sub
Colt Cabana	Pin
Toru Yano	7:47
Minoru Suzuki	28:45
Sanada	Pin

Quarterfinals; March 20, 21
Tomohiro Ishii	Pin
Yoshi-Hashi	20:25
Kazuchika Okada	Pin
Will Ospreay	20:10
Hiroshi Tanahashi	Pin
Zack Sabre Jr.	21:11
Colt Cabana	14:56
Sanada	Sub

Semifinals; March 23
Tomohiro Ishii	21:10
Kazuchika Okada	Pin
Hiroshi Tanahashi	24:11
Sanada	Sub

Final; March 24
Kazuchika Okada	Pin
Sanada	33:07

=== 2020 ===
New Japan Cup 2020
- Promotion: New Japan Pro-Wrestling
- Date: June 16 – July 11, 2020
- City: Various, Japan; Final: Osaka, Japan
- Venue: Various; Final: Osaka-jō Hall

Event chronology
← Previous; Together Project Special	Next → Dominion in Osaka-jo Hall

New Japan Cup chronology
← Previous; 2019	Next → 2021

The 2020 New Japan Cup took place between June 16 and July 11. It was originally going to take place from March 4 until March 21, but was postponed when New Japan Pro-Wrestling suspended all of its activities due to the COVID-19 pandemic.

On June 9, New Japan Pro-Wrestling announced that it would resume its activities, beginning with the 2020 edition of the New Japan Cup, which would now be an Openweight tournament and take place from June 16 until July 11, with the final being held at Osaka-jō Hall in Osaka.

Due to both the Heavyweight and Intercontinental titles being held by Tetsuya Naito, the winner of the tournament would earn a match against him for both titles at Dominion in Osaka-jo Hall, instead of choosing one title to challenge for.

Round 1 June 16, 17, 22, 23
Togi Makabe	Pin
Yota Tsuji	08:41
Tomohiro Ishii	Pin
El Desperado	20:17
Toru Yano	Pin
Jado	09:07
Tomoaki Honma	18:45
Hiromu Takahashi	Pin
Kazuchika Okada	Sub
Gedo	15:30
Yuji Nagata	Pin
Minoru Suzuki	20:35
Yuya Uemura	09:32
Yoshinobu Kanemaru	Pin
Gabriel Kidd	08:53
Taiji Ishimori	Sub
Hiroshi Tanahashi	21:51
Taichi	Pin
Kota Ibushi	Pin
Zack Sabre Jr.	15:15
Ryusuke Taguchi	15:47
Sanada	Pin
Sho	Pin
Shingo Takagi	17:06
Hiroyoshi Tenzan	17:35
Yoshi-Hashi	Sub
Yoh	15:42
Bushi	Pin
Satoshi Kojima	20:08
Evil	Pin
Hirooki Goto	Pin
Yujiro Takahashi	16:40

Round 2 June 24, July 1
Togi Makabe	13:28
Tomohiro Ishii	Pin
Toru Yano	09:17
Hiromu Takahashi	CO
Kazuchika Okada	Sub
Yuji Nagata	20:14
Yoshinobu Kanemaru	09:18
Taiji Ishimori	Pin
Taichi	Pin
Kota Ibushi	18:08
Sanada	Sub
Sho	14:43
Yoshi-Hashi	Pin
Bushi	10:22
Evil	Pin
Hirooki Goto	18:25

Quarterfinals; July 2
Tomohiro Ishii	19:12
Hiromu Takahashi	Pin
Kazuchika Okada	Sub
Taiji Ishimori	16:52
Taichi	22:50
Sanada	Pin
Yoshi-Hashi	2:00
Evil	Stop

Semifinals; July 3
Hiromu Takahashi	27:00
Kazuchika Okada	Stop
Sanada	20:13
Evil	Pin

Final; July 11
Kazuchika Okada	31:50
Evil	Pin

==== Original card ====
The original card for the New Japan Cup, when it was scheduled to take place from March 4 to March 21, had to be completely re-worked for the eventual final card, as several wrestlers who originally planned to participate could not go to Japan when NJPW resumed its activities due to travel restrictions amid the pandemic.

Of the 32 wrestlers included in the original card, 14 were not a part of the eventual tournament in June–July: Alex Coughlin, Bad Luck Fale, Chase Owens, Colt Cabana, David Finlay, Karl Fredericks, Jay White, Kenta, Jeff Cobb, Juice Robinson, Mikey Nicholls, Tanga Loa, Toa Henare, and Will Ospreay.

Cancelled Round 1 card

Day 1 (March 4)
Togi Makabe vs Jeff Cobb	Tomohiro Ishii vs Toa Henare	Toru Yano vs. Chase Owens	Colt Cabana vs. Bad Luck Fale
Day 2 (March 7)
Kazuchika Okada vs. Jay White	Yuji Nagata vs. Minoru Suzuki	Juice Robinson vs. Alex Coughlin	David Finlay vs. Tanga Loa
Day 3 (March 8)
Hiroshi Tanahashi vs. Taichi	Kota Ibushi vs. Zack Sabre Jr.	Mikey Nicholls vs. Sanada	Will Ospreay vs. Shingo Takagi
Day 4 (March 9)
Hiroyoshi Tenzan vs. Yoshi-Hashi	Karl Fredericks vs. Kenta	Satoshi Kojima vs. Evil	Hirooki Goto vs. Yujiro Takahashi

=== 2021 ===
New Japan Cup 2021
- Promotional poster for the March 14 show of the tournament, featuring various NJPW wrestlers.
- Promotion: New Japan Pro-Wrestling
- Date: March 4–21, 2021
- City: Various, Japan; Final: Sendai, Miyagi, Japan
- Venue: Various; Final: Xebio Arena Sendai

Event chronology
← Previous; Anniversary Event	Next → Road to Sakura Genesis 2021

New Japan Cup chronology
← Previous; 2020	Next → —

The 2021 edition's schedule was announced on January 13. The tournament ran from March 4, on NJPW's anniversary event, to March 21. The final night was NJPW's first show held at Xebio Arena Sendai. Evil and Hiroshi Tanahashi received byes on account of being the previous edition's winner and the reigning NEVER Openweight Champion respectively.

At the semifinals on March 20, the match between Kazuchika Okada, Hiroshi Tanahashi and Kota Ibushi and Bullet Club's Jay White, Kenta and Yujiro Takahashi was stopped due to a 7.0 magnitude earthquake that occurred in the Miyagi prefecture. While Bullet Club went backstage; Okada, Tanahashi, and Ibushi stayed in the ring area to calm the crowd and pose for pictures while New Japan employees were performing safety checks throughout the arena, which took about half an hour. After the safety checks were made, the match was able to continue with ring announcer Makoto Abe informing attendees shortly beforehand the rest of the event would be canceled if they were any additional aftershocks.

Round 1 March 4, 5, 6, 7, 9, 10
Satoshi Kojima	11:50
Jeff Cobb	Pin
Tetsuya Naito	20:20
Great-O-Khan	Stop
Toru Yano	CO
Bad Luck Fale	5:50
Taichi	22:43
Hirooki Goto	Pin
Kazuchika Okada	23:58
Shingo Takagi	Pin
Tomoaki Honma	14:54
Minoru Suzuki	Pin
Juice Robinson	17:17
Kenta	Sub
Hiroyoshi Tenzan	13:37
Will Ospreay	Pin
Gabriel Kidd	17:21
Zack Sabre Jr.	Sub
Yota Tsuji	13:42
Yuji Nagata	Pin
Tomohiro Ishii	25:18
Sanada	Pin
David Finlay	Pin
Chase Owens	11:20
Yoshi-Hashi	Pin
Yujiro Takahashi	15:50
Toa Henare	24:46
Jay White	Pin

Round 2 March 11, 13, 14, 15
Evil	Pin
Jeff Cobb	23:08
Great-O-Khan	13:02
Toru Yano	Pin
Hirooki Goto	23:51
Shingo Takagi	Pin
Minoru Suzuki	16:50
Kenta	Pin
Will Ospreay	Pin
Zack Sabre Jr.	21:23
Yuji Nagata	18:18
Sanada	Pin
David Finlay	Pin
Yoshi-Hashi	13:12
Jay White	Pin
Hiroshi Tanahashi	19:54

Quarterfinals; March 16, 18
Evil	Pin
Toru Yano	7:54
Shingo Takagi	Pin
Kenta	23:47
Will Ospreay	Pin
Sanada	18:56
David Finlay	Pin
Jay White	19:24

Semifinals; March 20
Evil	22:43
Shingo Takagi	Pin
Will Ospreay	Pin
David Finlay	21:04

Final; March 21
Shingo Takagi	30:06
Will Ospreay	Pin

=== 2022 ===
New Japan Cup 2022
- Promotion: New Japan Pro-Wrestling
- Date: March 2–27, 2022
- City: Various, Japan; Final: Osaka, Japan
- Venue: Various; Final: Osaka-jo Hall

Event chronology
← Previous; NJPW 50th Anniversary Show	Next → Hyper Battle

New Japan Cup chronology
← Previous; 2021	Next → —

The 2022 edition's schedule was announced on December 28, 2021, and the tournament ran from March 2 until March 27. The 2022 edition featured 48 participants & six rounds - the most of any NJC tournament - which included wrestlers from both heavyweight and junior heavyweight divisions including the champions.

Round 1 March 2, 6, 7
Kazuchika Okada	Pin
El Desperado	26:21
Toru Yano	6:25
Taichi	Pin
Yuji Nagata	12:37
Hirooki Goto	Pin
Cima	Pin
Taka Michinoku	9:48
Hiroshi Tanahashi	Pin
Yoh	16:50
Tetsuya Naito	Pin
Yujiro Takahashi	18:11
Togi Makabe	8:10
Jeff Cobb	Pin
Tomoaki Honma	9:45
Yoshi-Hashi	Pin
Kota Ibushi	Forfeit (Note: Forfeited due to Ibushi's lingering injuries.)
Great-O-Khan	N/A
Ryohei Oiwa	10:35
Zack Sabre Jr.	Sub
Yuto Nakashima	8:40
Aaron Henare	Pin
Bushi	12:48
Will Ospreay	Pin
Tomohiro Ishii	23:32
Shingo Takagi	Pin
Chase Owens	Pin
Jado	7:13
Ryusuke Taguchi	7:26
Evil	Pin
Hiromu Takahashi	Pin
Sho	15:45

Round 2 March 9, 10, 12, 13
Kazuchika Okada	Pin
Master Wato	18:34
Taichi	N/A
Hiroyoshi Tenzan	Forfeit (Note: Forfeited due to a knee injury.)
Hirooki Goto	Sub
Dick Togo	9:50
Cima	Pin
Yoshinobu Kanemaru	14:46
Hiroshi Tanahashi	Pin
Bad Luck Fale	15:01
Tetsuya Naito	Pin
Gedo	14:18
Jeff Cobb	Pin
Satoshi Kojima	15:36
Yoshi-Hashi	Sub
Kosei Fujita	9:20
Great-O-Khan	Pin
Taiji Ishimori	16:43
Zack Sabre Jr.	Sub
Douki	15:03
Aaron Henare	25:07
Sanada	Pin
Will Ospreay	Pin
El Phantasmo	17:31
Shingo Takagi	Pin
Tanga Loa	12:31
Chase Owens	Pin
Tiger Mask	10:33
Evil	Pin
Tama Tonga	14:21
Hiromu Takahashi	Pin
Minoru Suzuki	19:27

Round 3 March 14, 15, 17, 18
Kazuchika Okada	Pin
Taichi	24:17
Hirooki Goto	17:20
Cima	Pin
Hiroshi Tanahashi	18:41
Tetsuya Naito	Pin
Jeff Cobb	Pin
Yoshi-Hashi	17:22
Great-O-Khan	20:03
Zack Sabre Jr.	Sub
Sanada	16:56
Will Ospreay	Stop
Shingo Takagi	Pin
Chase Owens	16:41
Evil	15:52
Hiromu Takahashi	Pin

Quarterfinals; March 20, 21
Kazuchika Okada	Pin
Cima	20:52
Tetsuya Naito	Pin
Jeff Cobb	19:04
Zack Sabre Jr.	Sub
Will Ospreay	23:04
Shingo Takagi	Pin
Hiromu Takahashi	23:43

Semifinals; March 26
Kazuchika Okada	27:42
Tetsuya Naito	Pin
Zack Sabre Jr.	Stop
Shingo Takagi	19:24

Final; March 27
Tetsuya Naito	24:43
Zack Sabre Jr.	Pin

=== 2023 ===
New Japan Cup 2023
- Promotion: New Japan Pro-Wrestling
- Date: March 5–21, 2023
- City: Various, Japan; Final: Nagaoka, Japan
- Venue: Various; Final: City Hall Plaza Aore Nagaoka

New Japan Cup chronology
← Previous; 2022	Next → 2024

The 2023 edition's schedule was announced on January 7, 2023, and the tournament ran from March 5 until March 21.

Round 1 March 5, 6, 8, 10
Sanada	Pin
Taichi	24:27
Tetsuya Naito	Pin
El Phantasmo	17:32
Ren Narita	18:44
Evil	Pin
Toru Yano	12:33
Mark Davis	Pin
Yoshi-Hashi	20:06
Kyle Fletcher	Pin
Shingo Takagi	20:46
Aaron Henare	Pin
David Finlay	Pin
Tomohiro Ishii	18:40
Shota Umino	Pin
Yujiro Takahashi	9:47

Round 2 March 11, 12, 13, 15
Kenta	29:12
Sanada	Pin
Chase Owens	18:07
Tetsuya Naito	Pin
Jeff Cobb	17:42
Evil	Pin
Will Ospreay	Pin
Mark Davis	20:01
Hirooki Goto	Pin
Kyle Fletcher	20:43
Tama Tonga	Pin
Aaron Henare	16:34
Great-O-Khan	13:07
David Finlay	Pin
Zack Sabre Jr.	26:12
Shota Umino	Pin

Quarterfinals; March 17, 18
Sanada	Pin
Tetsuya Naito	24:41
Evil	15:30
Mark Davis (Note: Ospreay withdrew from the tournament due to a shoulder injury. Davis replaced Ospreay.)	Pin
Hirooki Goto	16:38
Tama Tonga	Pin
David Finlay	Pin
Shota Umino	17:50

Semifinals; March 19
Sanada	Pin
Mark Davis	13:20
Tama Tonga	18:27
David Finlay	Pin

Final; March 21
Sanada	Pin
David Finlay	19:56

=== 2024 ===
New Japan Cup 2024
- Promotion: New Japan Pro-Wrestling
- Date: March 6–20, 2024
- City: Various, Japan; Final: Nagaoka, Japan
- Venue: Various; Final: City Hall Plaza Aore Nagaoka

New Japan Cup chronology
← Previous; 2023	Next → 2025

The 2024 edition's schedule was announced on December 27, 2023, and the tournament ran from March 6 until March 20.

Round 1 March 6, 7, 8, 10
Yoshi-Hashi	Pin
Kenta	10:55
Shota Umino	12:20
Jack Perry	Pin
Toru Yano	Countout
Yujiro Takahashi	2:56
TJP	16:17
David Finlay	Pin
Tanga Loa	Pin
Great-O-Khan	15:50
Tomohiro Ishii	16:20
Chase Owens	Pin
Hikuleo	Pin
Oleg Boltin	9:21
Shingo Takagi	Pin
Yuya Uemura	23:22
Callum Newman	14:10
Gabe Kidd	Pin
Yota Tsuji	Pin
Jeff Cobb	21:41
El Phantasmo	Pin
Mikey Nicholls	13:21
Taichi	18:54
Ren Narita	Pin

Round 2 March 11, 12, 13, 15
Sanada	Pin
Yoshi-Hashi	23:51
Jack Perry	Pin
Toru Yano	8:28
David Finlay	Pin
Tanga Loa	16:42
Chase Owens	21:36
Hirooki Goto	Pin
Evil	Pin
Hikuleo	14:32
Shingo Takagi	Pin
Gabe Kidd	18:20
Yota Tsuji	Pin
El Phantasmo	21:56
Ren Narita	Pin
Zack Sabre Jr.	23:08

Quarterfinals; March 16, 17
Sanada	Pin
Jack Perry	16:02
David Finlay	(Note: Finlay forfeited his match due to suffering an illness.)
Hirooki Goto	Forfeit
Evil	Pin
Shingo Takagi	17:33
Yota Tsuji	Pin
Ren Narita	18:08

Semifinals; March 18
Sanada	19:05
Hirooki Goto	Pin
Evil	16:50
Yota Tsuji	Pin

Final; March 20
Hirooki Goto	23:01
Yota Tsuji	Pin

=== 2025 ===
New Japan Cup 2025
- Promotion: New Japan Pro-Wrestling
- Date: March 8–20, 2025
- City: Various, Japan; Final: Nagaoka, Japan
- Venue: Various; Final: City Hall Plaza Aore Nagaoka

New Japan Cup chronology
← Previous; 2024	Next → 2026

The 2025 edition's schedule was announced on December 28, 2024, and the tournament ran from March 8 until March 20.

Round 1 March 8, 9
Yota Tsuji	4:53
Evil	Pin
Yuya Uemura	Pin
Sanada	15:47
Ryohei Oiwa	Pin
Chase Owens	9:39
Gabe Kidd	Pin
Ren Narita	22:15
El Phantasmo	13:59
Great-O-Khan	Pin
Tetsuya Naito	Pin
Callum Newman	11:05
Tomohiro Ishii	14:04
Drilla Moloney	Pin
Boltin Oleg	Pin
Bad Luck Fale	7:11

Round 2 March 11, 12, 14
David Finlay	Countout
Evil	17:03
Yoshi-Hashi	14:49
Yuya Uemura	Pin
Zack Sabre Jr.	Pin
Ryohei Oiwa	19:12
Taichi	Countout
Gabe Kidd	20:35
Shota Umino	Pin
Great-O-Khan	22:55
Jeff Cobb	Pin
Tetsuya Naito	15:03
TJP	15:04
Drilla Moloney	Pin
Shingo Takagi	Pin
Boltin Oleg	18:45

Quarterfinals; March 15
David Finlay	Pin
Yuya Uemura	14:59
Zack Sabre Jr.	Pin
Taichi	26:27
Shota Umino	Pin
Jeff Cobb	10:25
Drilla Moloney	11:13
Shingo Takagi	Pin

Semifinals; March 16, 17
David Finlay	Pin
Zack Sabre Jr.	20:12
Shota Umino	Pin
Shingo Takagi	24:10

Final; March 20
David Finlay	Pin
Shota Umino	27:58

=== 2026 ===
New Japan Cup 2026
- Promotion: New Japan Pro-Wrestling
- Date: March 4–21, 2026
- City: Various, Japan; Final: Nagaoka, Japan
- Venue: Various; Final: City Hall Plaza Aore Nagaoka

New Japan Cup chronology
← Previous; 2025	Next → —

The 2026 edition's schedule was announced on February 13, 2026, and the tournament ran from March 4 until March 21.

Round 1 March 4, 5, 6, 8
Yuya Uemura	22:03
Great-O-Khan	Pin
Aaron Wolf	Pin
Don Fale	8:46
Taichi	Pin
Ren Narita	22:46
El Phantasmo	Pin
Boltin Oleg	18:09
Yoshi-Hashi	TKO
Jake Lee	14:04
Oskar	Pin
Callum Newman	11:18
Shota Umino	19:39
Chase Owens	Pin
Yuto-Ice	Pin
Ryohei Oiwa	16:04

Round 2 March 10, 12, 13, 14
Yuya Uemura	22:26
Drilla Moloney	Pin
Don Fale	Pin
Shingo Takagi	9:28
Ren Narita	12:10
Satoshi Kojima (Note: Originally Tomohiro Ishii was scheduled to compete but he was removed from the tournament entirely due to a neck injury.)	Pin
Boltin Oleg	22:11
Henare	Pin
Jake Lee	Pin
Hirooki Goto	15:09
Callum Newman	14:43
Hartley Jackson	Pin
Shota Umino	18:14
Yujiro Takahashi	Pin
Ryohei Oiwa	Pin
Zack Sabre Jr.	28:07

Quarterfinals; March 15, 17
Yuya Uemura	26:07
Shingo Takagi	Pin
Ren Narita	Pin
Boltin Oleg	13:22
Hirooki Goto	Pin
Callum Newman	12:34
Shota Umino	25:39
Zack Sabre Jr.	Pin

Semifinals; March 20
Yuya Uemura	19:25
Boltin Oleg	Pin
Callum Newman	30:02
Shota Umino	Pin

Final; March 21
Yuya Uemura	Pin
Callum Newman	25:50

== See also ==
- New Japan Pro-Wrestling
- New Japan Cup USA
- King of DDT Tournament
- Ōdō Tournament
- Ryūkon Cup
- Tennōzan
- Wrestle-1 Grand Prix
