= IWGP Heavyweight Championship =

Men's championship of New Japan Pro-Wrestling

- The "V4" IWGP Heavyweight Championship belt (2008 – 2021, 2026 – present)

Details
- Promotion: New Japan Pro-Wrestling (NJPW)
- Date established: June 12, 1987
- Current champion: Yota Tsuji
- Date won: June 14, 2026

Other names
- IWGP Heavyweight Championship (1987–2021, 2026–present); IWGP World Heavyweight Championship (2021–2026)
Statistics
- First champion: Antonio Inoki
- Most reigns: Hiroshi Tanahashi (8 reigns)
- Longest reign: Kazuchika Okada (4th reign) (720 days)
- Shortest reign: Kensuke Sasaki (4th reign) (16 days)
- Oldest champion: Genichiro Tenryu (49 years, 10 months and 8 days)
- Youngest champion: Callum Newman (23 years, 7 months and 4 days)
- Heaviest champion: Big Van Vader (185 kg (408 lb))
- Lightest champion: Kota Ibushi (93 kg (205 lb))

The IWGP Heavyweight Championship (IWGPヘビー級王座, IWGP hebī-kyū ōza) is a men's professional wrestling world heavyweight championship owned by New Japan Pro-Wrestling (NJPW). (Note: "IWGP" is the acronym of NJPW's storyline governing body, the International Wrestling Grand Prix (インターナショナル・レスリング・グラン・プリ, intānashonaru resuringu guran puri).) The current champion is Yota Tsuji in his second reign. He won the title by defeating Callum Newman at Dominion 6.14 in Osaka-jo Hall in Osaka, Japan, on June 14, 2026.

The title was first introduced on June 12, 1987 as the prize of that year's IWGP League tournament, with Antonio Inoki crowned as the inaugural champion. Although bearing the same name, it was established as the successor to the original IWGP Heavyweight Championship that existed from 1983 to 1987. The title was later unified with the IWGP Intercontinental Championship on March 4, 2021 to form the IWGP World Heavyweight Championship, which was originally recognized as a new separate title, with both the Heavyweight and Intercontinental championships retired. However, on January 6, 2026, Tsuji declared, two days after winning the title, that the Heavyweight Championship was reactivated, replacing the World Heavyweight Championship and retroactively unifying the lineages of both titles.

The championship has been primarily represented by five different belt designs from 1987 to 2026, including the IWGP World Heavyweight Championship. The fourth design, or the V4, was introduced in March 2008, previously retired in 2021, and reintroduced in 2026. The IWGP Heavyweight Championship is regularly defended as the primary heavyweight championship in NJPW.

== Title history ==
=== IWGP Heavyweight Championship (1987–2021) ===
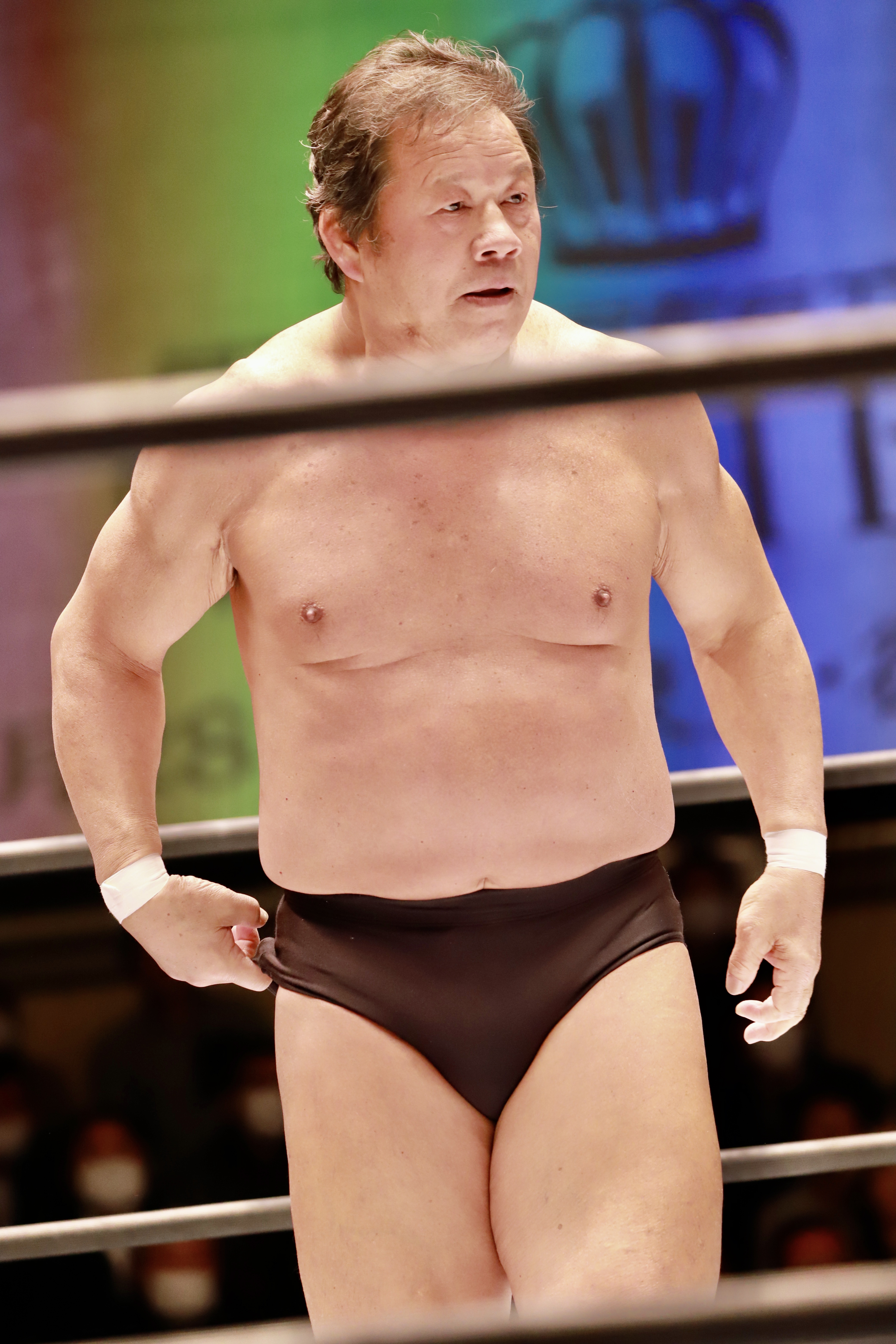
Tatsumi Fujinami, who (as the Inoki-anointed top star of NJPW) won the Heavyweight title six times between 1988 and 1998.

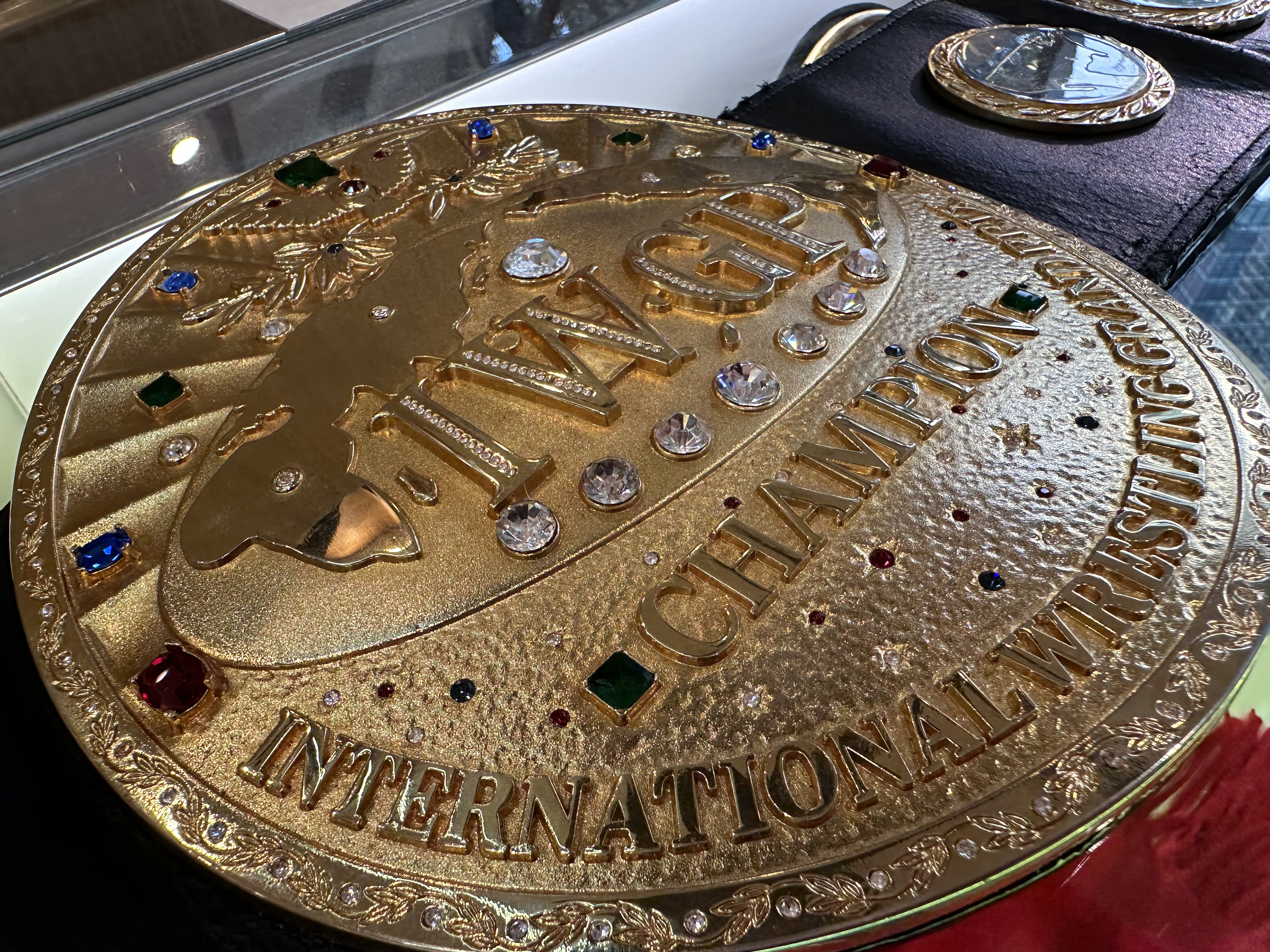
The original IWGP Heavyweight Championship belt design, used for both the V1 of the defended title belt and the original design of the original title.

An early version of this championship was introduced as the prize of the 1983 IWGP League (which later evolved into the G1 Climax), which was won by Hulk Hogan. In 1984 and 1985, the winner of the IWGP League instead earned the right to challenge for the championship at the conclusion of the tournament, and in 1986, then-champion and company founder Antonio Inoki vacated the championship in order to compete in that year's tournament. In 1987, this version of the championship was deactivated and the winner of that year's tournament, Inoki, was recognized as the inaugural IWGP Heavyweight Champion. His student, Tatsumi Fujinami, who had become NJPW's first homegrown star, won the championship after Inoki had an injury in 1988, after defeating one of Inoki's main rivals in the American Big Van Vader in May 1988. After Fujinami and Riki Choshu had fought to a no contest that same month, the title was vacated pending an immediate rematch for the title, which Fujinami won in June. Choshu, Fujinami, and Vader traded the championship from 1989 until 1992 (with the exception of Salman Hashimikov, who won the title from Vader in 1989, and lost it to Choshu later).

Keiji Muto, as his Great Muta persona, was the first of the Toukon Sanjushi, or Three Musketeers of NJPW, to win the championship, when he defeated Riki Choshu in Fukuoka in 1992. In the same match, he gained Choshu's Greatest 18 Club Championship, which retired afterward. In his championship reign, he assumed the longest up to that point at 400 days; he lost the belt to a fellow Musketeer, Shinya Hashimoto, in September 1993. Muto won the championship again in 1995, during the invasion by UWF International. After UWFi founder and ace Nobuhiko Takada won the belt off Muto at Wrestling World 1996, Hashimoto gained the title from the invading Takada, and put an end to the rivalry.

In the early 2000s, Inoki saw the rise of several mixed-martial-arts or hybrid-MMA/pro-wrestling stars to become IWGP Heavyweight Champions. The first was Kazuyuki Fujita in 2001, which was followed afterward (after Fujita suffered an injury) by Tadao Yasuda. Yoshihiro Takayama, Yuji Nagata and Shinsuke Nakamura, who were trained wrestlers that did MMA consecutively, also won the title during this period; the latter, Nakamura, became the youngest IWGP Heavyweight Champion at the age of 23. After Bob Sapp won the title and Fujita had his second and third reigns, this style of booking was dropped.

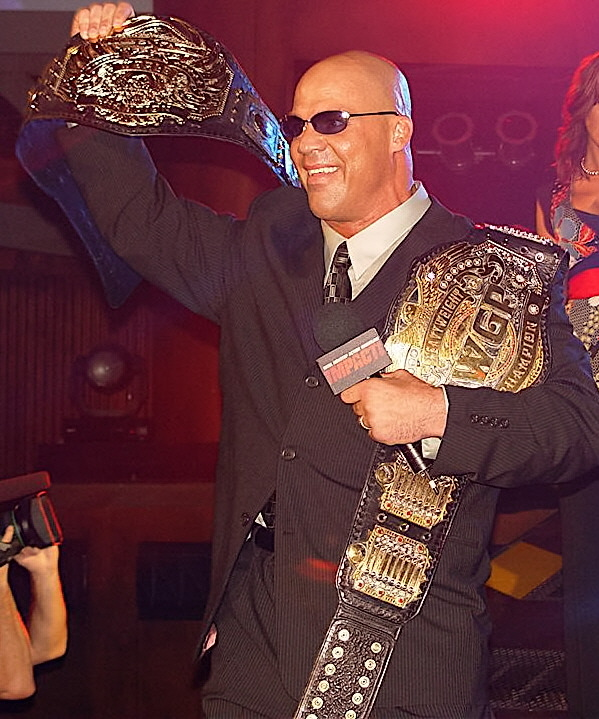
Kurt Angle, with the IWGP Heavyweight Championship (recognized by NJPW as the "IWGP 3rd Belt Champion") in his left arm

As part of a storyline between 2003-2004, NJPW recognized the previously-established NWF Heavyweight Championship as the second primary heavyweight championship in the company, which was unified after IWGP champion Shinsuke Nakamura defeated NWF champion Yoshihiro Takayama at Wrestling World 2004. In July 2006, Brock Lesnar was stripped of the title after he refused to defend it, claiming he was owed money by NJPW. The company proceeded to crown a new champion, while Lesnar kept the physical belt. He signed with Antonio Inoki's Inoki Genome Federation (IGF) in 2007, and lost the championship to Kurt Angle at the promotion's inaugural event. Angle, who was recognized by his home promotion Total Nonstop Action Wrestling (TNA) as the "IWGP Heavyweight Champion" and by NJPW as the "IWGP 3rd Belt Champion", lost the IGF title in a unification match to the NJPW-recognized Heavyweight Champion Shinsuke Nakamura in February 2008.

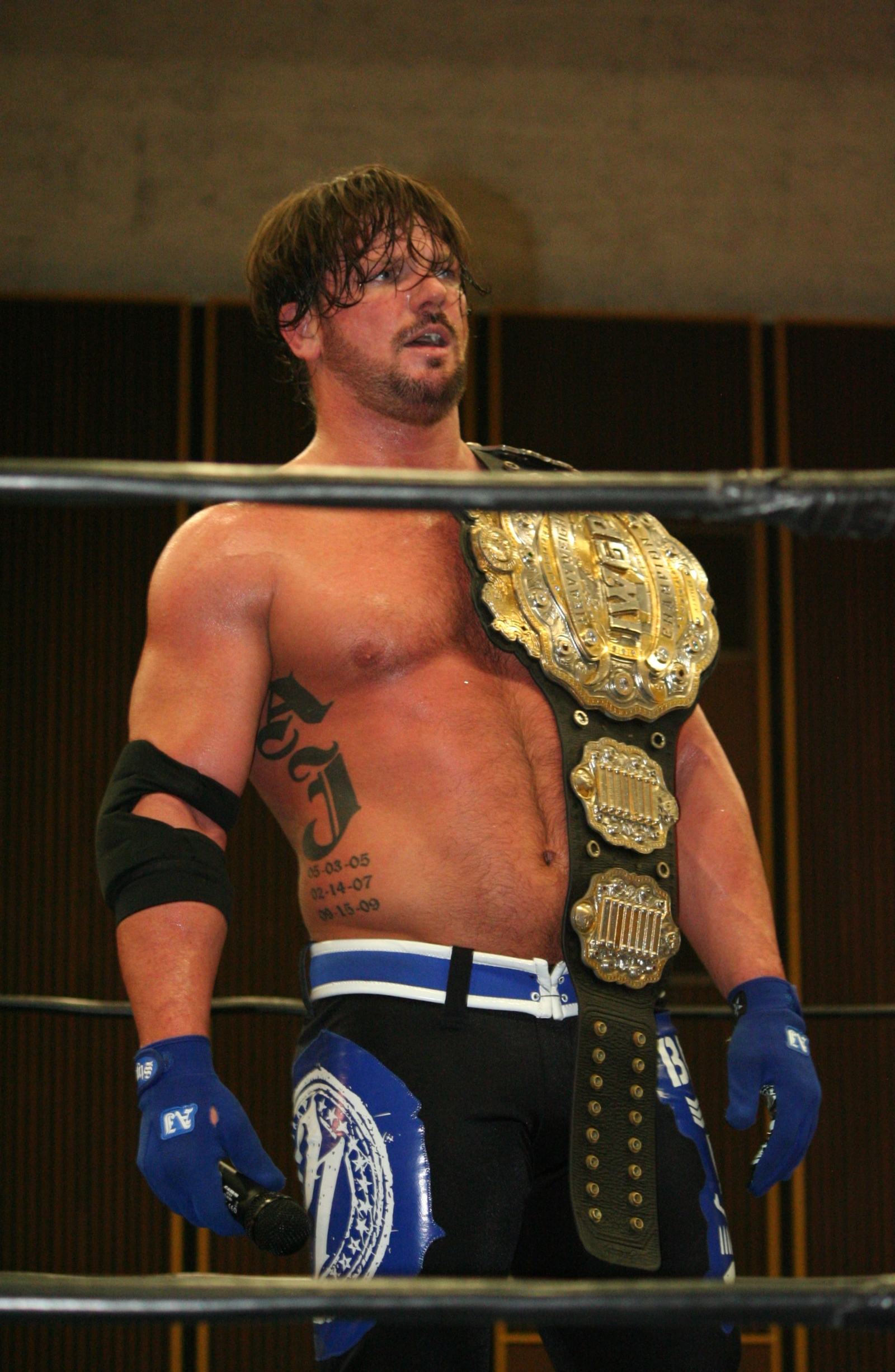
AJ Styles with the IWGP Heavyweight Championship in 2014

In the midst of a one year reign as champion, NJPW ace Hiroshi Tanahashi was challenged by the recently-returned Kazuchika Okada. A change in booking was made apparent by Okada winning the championship from Tanahashi, as Bushiroad had just bought NJPW for ¥500 million and Gedo assumed the role as head booker of NJPW. Okada and Tanahashi traded the championship with themselves and others, with a break in-between for wrestlers like AJ Styles and Tetsuya Naito, who had also become popular established stars. Between 2012 and 2018, there were no unsuccessful championship defenses that took place at the January 4th Tokyo Dome event (Wrestle Kingdoms VI through 12). Within 2016 to 2018, Kazuchika Okada had, in his fourth overall reign, the longest reigning (720 days) and the most successfully-defense championship (twelve defenses) reign of the title, which began with a win against the incumbent Tetsuya Naito at Dominion 6.19, and ended with a loss to Kenny Omega at Dominion 6.9 (both at Osaka-jō Hall).

In 2019, when he was IWGP Intercontinental Champion, Tetsuya Naito declared his intention of making history by becoming the first to hold the IWGP Heavyweight and Intercontinental Championship at the same time. By the end of the year, Jay White, who had won the Intercontinental Championship from Naito, and Kota Ibushi, who was the next challenger for the Heavyweight Championship, also expressed the same desire. After a fan vote, it was decided that Naito, White, Ibushi, and Heavyweight Champion Kazuchika Okada would compete at Wrestle Kingdom 14 on January 4–5, 2020, where one would end up with both titles. Naito achieved the feat to become the first "Double Champion" and the two titles were defended together since (apart from one time). During 2020, Naito said his original intention was for the titles to be defended separately. He requested for this, or otherwise for the titles to be unified, but no change happened. Both titles kept their individual history, but were defended at the same time and were sometimes referred to as the "Double Championship".

=== IWGP World Heavyweight Championship (2021–2026) ===
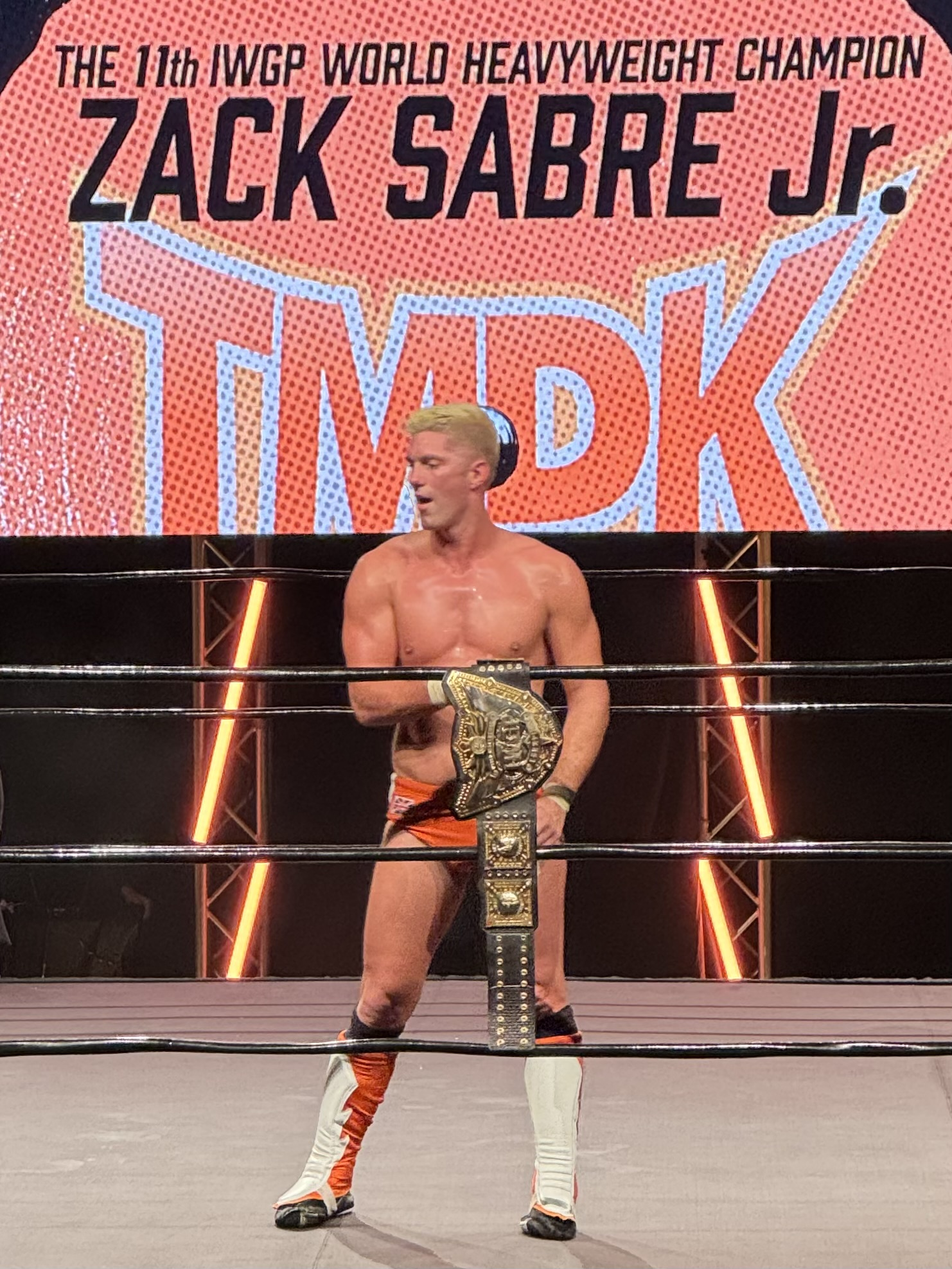
Zack Sabre Jr. with the IWGP World Heavyweight Championship, at Revolution Pro Wrestling's Global Wars UK in 2024

The IWGP World Heavyweight Championship title's design, used from 2021–2026

After Ibushi won the titles from Naito at Wrestle Kingdom 15 on January 4, 2021, he expressed his desire for the titles to be unified. On March 1, 2021, with Ibushi still champion, the unification of the titles to create the new IWGP World Heavyweight Championship was officially announced, with Ibushi as the inaugural World Heavyweight Champion. After the announcement, Ibushi, who was scheduled to face then-IWGP Junior Heavyweight Champion El Desperado at the NJPW 49th Anniversary Show on March 4, 2021 in a non-title match, requested for the match to be for both belts to determine the first World Heavyweight Champion. Ibushi won the match, and the new belt was eventually revealed and presented on March 30, 2021. Its design incorporated the past belt designs of the two old titles. The design also drew a negative reaction from fans and commentators, the Last Word on Sports citing its unusual shaped front plate as a reason for its unpopularity. While champion, Ibushi noted the negative reaction in interviews.

Unusually for a unification, during the time the World Heavyweight Championship was active, NJPW considered both the Heavyweight Championship and the Intercontinental Champion deactivated, with the World Heavyweight Championship using a brand new lineage rather than continuing one of the belts' history. As part of a storyline in late 2021, Kazuchika Okada was awarded the old Heavyweight Championship belt after defeating Ibushi in that year's G1 Climax final. After defeating then-champion Shingo Takagi at Wrestle Kingdom 16, he elected to be recognized as the World Heavyweight Champion instead of reviving the Heavyweight Championship.

=== IWGP Heavyweight Championship (2026–present) ===
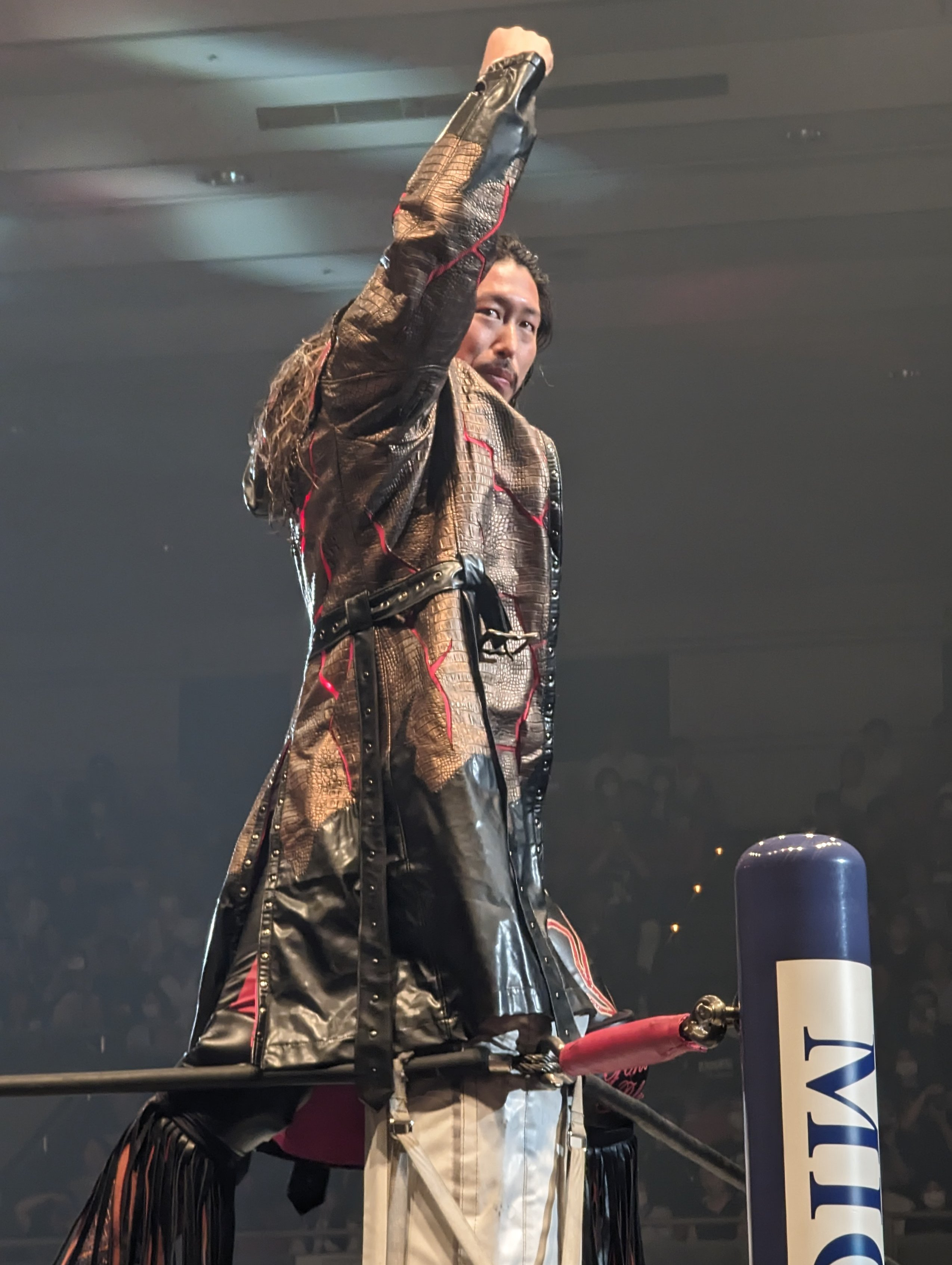
Yota Tsuji reactivated the championship in 2026, and combined the lineages of both the Heavyweight and the World Heavyweight titles.

At Wrestle Kingdom 20 in January 2026, Yota Tsuji defended the IWGP Global Heavyweight Championship against incumbent IWGP World Heavyweight Champion Konosuke Takeshita in a double-title match. Tsuji defeated Takeshita and proclaimed himself the IWGP Heavyweight Champion both in the post-match in-ring promo, and at New Year Dash!! a day later, stating that the World title was "cursed". In accordance with his wishes, NJPW revived the IWGP Heavyweight Championship V4 belt, reactivating its and the IWGP Intercontinental Championship's lineages, and combined said lineages with the World Heavyweight Championship. As a result, all former World Heavyweight Champions were retroactively recognized as both former Heavyweight and Intercontinental Champions, and Tsuji was recognized as the 87th IWGP Heavyweight Champion.

== Reigns ==
As of October 31, 2026, there have been 89 reigns shared among 40 different wrestlers with 11 vacancies. Title changes predominantly occur during NJPW-promoted events. There have been 12 foreign-born IWGP Heavyweight Champions, including six Americans (Big Van Vader, Scott Norton, Bob Sapp, Brock Lesnar, AJ Styles and Jon Moxley) and three Brits (Will Ospreay, Zack Sabre Jr. and Callum Newman). Those that hail from other foreign nations include Salman Hashimikov (the Soviet Union in what is now Kazakhstan), Kenny Omega (Canada) and Jay White (New Zealand). Masahiro Chono, despite being born in the United States, is not classified as foreign-born due to his being raised in Japan by Japanese nationals.

Antonio Inoki was the first champion in the title's history; Hiroshi Tanahashi holds the record for most reigns with eight. Kazuchika Okada holds the record for the longest reign in the title's history at 720 days during his fourth reign, over which he successfully defended the title 12 times, more defenses than any other title holder; Kensuke Sasaki's fourth reign of 16 days is the shortest in the title's history. Over his seven reigns, Okada successfully defended the title 36 times, the most of any champion; sixteen championship reigns have had zero defenses. Callum Newman is the youngest champion at the age of 23 years, 7 months and 4 days.

Yota Tsuji is the current champion in his second reign. He won the title by defeating Callum Newman at Dominion 6.14 in Osaka-jo Hall in Osaka, Japan, on June 14, 2026.

Key
No.	Overall reign number
Reign	Reign number for the specific champion
Days	Number of days held
Defenses	Number of successful defenses

No.	Champion	Championship change			Reign statistics			Notes	Ref.
No.	Champion	Date	Event	Location	Reign	Days	Defenses	Notes	Ref.
1	Antonio Inoki	June 12, 1987	IWGP Champion Series 1987	Tokyo, Japan	1	325	4	Defeated Masa Saito in a tournament final.	
—	Vacated	May 2, 1988	—	—	—	—	—	Vacated due to Inoki fracturing his left foot.	
2	Tatsumi Fujinami	May 8, 1988	Super Fight Series 1988	Tokyo, Japan	1	19	1	Defeated Big Van Vader to win the vacant title.	
—	Vacated	May 27, 1988	—	—	—	—	—	Title held up after defense against Riki Choshu ended in a no contest.	
3	Tatsumi Fujinami	June 24, 1988	IWGP Champion Series 1988	Osaka, Japan	2	285	7	Defeated Riki Choshu to win the vacant title.	
—	Vacated	April 5, 1989	—	—	—	—	—	Vacated so the title could be decided in a tournament.	
4	Big Van Vader	April 24, 1989	Battle Satellite in Tokyo Dome	Tokyo, Japan	1	31	0	Defeated Shinya Hashimoto in a tournament final to win the vacant title.	
5	Salman Hashimikov	May 25, 1989	Battle Satellite 1989 in Osaka Dome	Osaka, Japan	1	48	0		
6	Riki Choshu	July 12, 1989	Summer Fight Series 1989	Osaka, Japan	1	29	0		
7	Big Van Vader	August 10, 1989	Fighting Satellite of 1989	Tokyo, Japan	2	374	4		
8	Riki Choshu	August 19, 1990	Summer Night Fever II	Tokyo, Japan	2	129	1		
9	Tatsumi Fujinami	December 26, 1990	King of Kings	Hamamatsu, Japan	3	22	0		
10	Big Van Vader	January 17, 1991	New Year Dash 1991	Yokohama, Japan	3	46	0		
11	Tatsumi Fujinami	March 4, 1991	Big Fight Series 1991	Hiroshima, Japan	4	306	3		
12	Riki Choshu	January 4, 1992	Super Warriors in Tokyo Dome	Tokyo, Japan	3	225	4	This match was also for Choshu's Greatest 18 Championship.	
13	The Great Muta	August 16, 1992	G1 Climax Special 1992	Fukuoka, Japan	1	400	5	This match was also for Choshu's Greatest 18 Championship.	
14	Shinya Hashimoto	September 20, 1993	G1 Climax Special 1993	Nagoya, Japan	1	196	4		
15	Tatsumi Fujinami	April 4, 1994	Battle Line Kyushu	Hiroshima, Japan	5	27	0		
16	Shinya Hashimoto	May 1, 1994	Wrestling Dontaku 1994	Fukuoka, Japan	2	367	9		
17	Keiji Muto	May 3, 1995	Wrestling Dontaku 1995	Fukuoka, Japan	2	246	5	Muto previously won the title as The Great Muta.	
18	Nobuhiko Takada	January 4, 1996	Wrestling World 1996	Tokyo, Japan	1	116	1		
19	Shinya Hashimoto	April 29, 1996	Battle Formation	Tokyo, Japan	3	489	7		
20	Kensuke Sasaki	August 31, 1997	Final Power Hall in Yokohama	Yokohama, Japan	1	216	3		
21	Tatsumi Fujinami	April 4, 1998	Antonio Inoki Retirement Show	Tokyo, Japan	6	126	2		
22	Masahiro Chono	August 8, 1998	Rising the Next Generation in Osaka Dome	Osaka, Japan	1	44	0		
—	Vacated	September 21, 1998	—	—	—	—	—	Title was vacated due to Chono's neck injury.	
23	Scott Norton	September 23, 1998	Big Wednesday	Yokohama, Japan	1	103	4	Defeated Yuji Nagata to win the vacant title.	
24	Keiji Muto	January 4, 1999	Wrestling World 1999	Tokyo, Japan	3	340	5		
25	Genichiro Tenryu	December 10, 1999	Battle Final 1999	Osaka, Japan	1	25	0		
26	Kensuke Sasaki	January 4, 2000	Wrestling World 2000	Tokyo, Japan	2	279	5		
—	Vacated	October 9, 2000	—	—	—	—	—	Vacated after Sasaki lost a non-title match to Toshiaki Kawada at Do Judge!!.	
27	Kensuke Sasaki	January 4, 2001	Wrestling World 2001	Tokyo, Japan	3	72	1	Defeated Toshiaki Kawada in a tournament final to win the vacant title.	
28	Scott Norton	March 17, 2001	Hyper Battle 2001	Nagoya, Japan	2	23	0		
29	Kazuyuki Fujita	April 9, 2001	Strong Style 2001	Osaka, Japan	1	270	2		
—	Vacated	January 4, 2002	—	—	—	—	—	Fujita vacated the title due to an injured achilles tendon.	
30	Tadao Yasuda	February 16, 2002	Fighting Spirit 2002	Tokyo, Japan	1	48	1	Defeated Yuji Nagata in a tournament final to win the vacant title.	
31	Yuji Nagata	April 5, 2002	Toukon Special	Tokyo, Japan	1	392	10		
32	Yoshihiro Takayama	May 2, 2003	Ultimate Crush	Tokyo, Japan	1	185	3	This match was also for Takayama's NWF Heavyweight Championship.	
33	Hiroyoshi Tenzan	November 3, 2003	Yokohama Dead Out	Yokohama, Japan	1	36	0		
34	Shinsuke Nakamura	December 9, 2003	Battle Final 2003	Osaka, Japan	1	58	1	Defeated Yoshihiro Takayama to unify the IWGP Heavyweight Championship with the NWF Heavyweight Championship on January 4, 2004, at Wrestling World 2004.	
—	Vacated	February 5, 2004	—	—	—	—	—	Title was vacated due to Nakamura suffering various injuries.	
35	Hiroyoshi Tenzan	February 15, 2004	Fighting Spirit 2004	Tokyo, Japan	2	26	1	Defeated Genichiro Tenryu in a tournament final for the vacant title.	
36	Kensuke Sasaki	March 12, 2004	Hyper Battle 2004	Tokyo, Japan	4	16	0		
37	Bob Sapp	March 28, 2004	King of Sports	Tokyo, Japan	1	66	1		
—	Vacated	June 2, 2004	—	—	—	—	—	Title vacated after Sapp lost a K-1 fight to Kazuyuki Fujita.	
38	Kazuyuki Fujita	June 5, 2004	The Crush II	Osaka, Japan	2	126	1	Defeated Hiroshi Tanahashi to win the vacant title.	
39	Kensuke Sasaki	October 9, 2004	Pro-Wrestlers Be Strongest	Tokyo, Japan	5	64	2		
40	Hiroyoshi Tenzan	December 12, 2004	Battle Final 2004	Nagoya, Japan	3	70	0		
41	Satoshi Kojima	February 20, 2005	New Year Gold Series	Tokyo, Japan	1	83	1	This match was also for Kojima's Triple Crown Heavyweight Championship.	
42	Hiroyoshi Tenzan	May 14, 2005	Nexess VI	Tokyo, Japan	4	65	1		
43	Kazuyuki Fujita	July 18, 2005	Summer Fight Series 2005	Sapporo, Japan	3	82	0		
44	Brock Lesnar	October 8, 2005	Toukon Souzou New Chapter	Tokyo, Japan	1	280	3	This was a three-way match, also involving Masahiro Chono.	
—	Vacated	July 15, 2006	—	—	—	—	—	Title was vacated due to Lesnar refusing to return and defend it due to a contract dispute. Lesnar kept the physical championship belt, and later was recognized by the Inoki Genome Federation as their first champion, using the same belt.	
45	Hiroshi Tanahashi	July 17, 2006	Circuit2006 Turbulence	Sapporo, Japan	1	270	4	Defeated Giant Bernard in a tournament final for the title.	
46	Yuji Nagata	April 13, 2007	Circuit2007 New Japan Brave tour	Osaka, Japan	2	178	2		
47	Hiroshi Tanahashi	October 8, 2007	Explosion '07	Tokyo, Japan	2	88	1		
48	Shinsuke Nakamura	January 4, 2008	Wrestle Kingdom II in Tokyo Dome	Tokyo, Japan	2	114	2	Defeated Kurt Angle on February 17, 2008, on the Circuit2008 New Japan Ism tour to unify the NJPW and IGF versions of the IWGP Heavyweight Championship.	
49	Keiji Muto	April 27, 2008	Circuit2008 New Japan Brave tour	Osaka, Japan	4	252	4		
50	Hiroshi Tanahashi	January 4, 2009	Wrestle Kingdom III in Tokyo Dome	Tokyo, Japan	3	122	3		
51	Manabu Nakanishi	May 6, 2009	Dissidence	Tokyo, Japan	1	45	0		
52	Hiroshi Tanahashi	June 20, 2009	Dominion 6.20	Osaka, Japan	4	58	1		
—	Vacated	August 17, 2009	—	—	—	—	—	Title vacated due to Tanahashi fracturing his eye socket.	
53	Shinsuke Nakamura	September 27, 2009	Circuit2009 New Japan Generation tour	Kobe, Japan	3	218	6	Defeated Togi Makabe to win the vacant title.	
54	Togi Makabe	May 3, 2010	Wrestling Dontaku 2010	Fukuoka, Japan	1	161	3		
55	Satoshi Kojima	October 11, 2010	Destruction '10	Tokyo, Japan	2	85	1		
56	Hiroshi Tanahashi	January 4, 2011	Wrestle Kingdom V in Tokyo Dome	Tokyo, Japan	5	404	11		
57	Kazuchika Okada	February 12, 2012	The New Beginning	Osaka, Japan	1	125	2		
58	Hiroshi Tanahashi	June 16, 2012	Dominion 6.16	Osaka, Japan	6	295	7		
59	Kazuchika Okada	April 7, 2013	Invasion Attack	Tokyo, Japan	2	391	8		
60	AJ Styles	May 3, 2014	Wrestling Dontaku 2014	Fukuoka, Japan	1	163	2		
61	Hiroshi Tanahashi	October 13, 2014	King of Pro-Wrestling	Tokyo, Japan	7	121	1		
62	AJ Styles	February 11, 2015	The New Beginning in Osaka	Osaka, Japan	2	144	1		
63	Kazuchika Okada	July 5, 2015	Dominion 7.5 in Osaka-jo Hall	Osaka, Japan	3	280	3		
64	Tetsuya Naito	April 10, 2016	Invasion Attack 2016	Tokyo, Japan	1	70	1		
65	Kazuchika Okada	June 19, 2016	Dominion 6.19 in Osaka-jo Hall	Osaka, Japan	4	720	12		
66	Kenny Omega	June 9, 2018	Dominion 6.9 in Osaka-jo Hall	Osaka, Japan	1	209	3	This was a no time limit two out of three falls match in which Omega won 2–1.	
67	Hiroshi Tanahashi	January 4, 2019	Wrestle Kingdom 13 in Tokyo Dome	Tokyo, Japan	8	38	0		
68	Jay White	February 11, 2019	The New Beginning in Osaka	Osaka, Japan	1	54	0		
69	Kazuchika Okada	April 6, 2019	G1 Supercard	New York City, U.S.	5	274	5		
70	Tetsuya Naito	January 5, 2020	Wrestle Kingdom 14 in Tokyo Dome; Night 2	Tokyo, Japan	2	189	1	This match was also for Naito's IWGP Intercontinental Championship.	
71	Evil	July 12, 2020	Dominion in Osaka-jo Hall	Osaka, Japan	1	48	1	This match was also for Naito's IWGP Intercontinental Championship.	
72	Tetsuya Naito	August 29, 2020	Summer Struggle in Jingu	Tokyo, Japan	3	128	1	This match was also for Evil's IWGP Intercontinental Championship.	
73	Kota Ibushi	January 4, 2021	Wrestle Kingdom 15 in Tokyo Dome; Night 1	Tokyo, Japan	1	90	3	This match was also for Naito's IWGP Intercontinental Championship. After Ibushi successfully defended both the IWGP Heavyweight and Intercontinental Championship against El Desperado at the 49th Anniversary Show, they were unified into the IWGP World Heavyweight Championship, with Ibushi as the inaugural champion.	
—	Unified	March 4, 2021	Anniversary Event	Tokyo, Japan	—	—	—	Unified with the IWGP Intercontinental Championship to form the IWGP World Heavyweight Championship. During the period when the IWGP World Heavyweight Championship was active, it was considered to have a distinct lineage to the IWGP Heavyweight Championship.	
74	Will Ospreay	April 4, 2021	Sakura Genesis	Tokyo, Japan	1	46	1		
—	Vacated	May 20, 2021	—	—	—	—	—	The championship was vacated due to Will Ospreay sustaining a neck injury.	
75	Shingo Takagi	June 7, 2021	Dominion 6.6 in Osaka-jo Hall	Osaka, Japan	1	211	3	Defeated Kazuchika Okada to win the vacant championship.	
76	Kazuchika Okada	January 4, 2022	Wrestle Kingdom 16; Night 1	Tokyo, Japan	6	159	4		
77	Jay White	June 12, 2022	Dominion 6.12 in Osaka-jo Hall	Osaka, Japan	2	206	2		
78	Kazuchika Okada	January 4, 2023	Wrestle Kingdom 17	Tokyo, Japan	7	94	2		
79	Sanada	April 8, 2023	Sakura Genesis	Tokyo, Japan	1	271	4		
80	Tetsuya Naito	January 4, 2024	Wrestle Kingdom 18	Tokyo, Japan	4	99	2		
81	Jon Moxley	April 12, 2024	Windy City Riot	Chicago, Illinois, U.S.	1	79	4		
82	Tetsuya Naito	June 30, 2024	AEW x NJPW: Forbidden Door	Elmont, New York, U.S.	5	106	1		
83	Zack Sabre Jr.	October 14, 2024	King of Pro-Wrestling	Tokyo, Japan	1	120	4		
84	Hirooki Goto	February 11, 2025	The New Beginning in Osaka	Osaka, Japan	1	138	7		
85	Zack Sabre Jr.	June 29, 2025	Tanahashi Jam	Nagoya, Japan	2	106	2		
86	Konosuke Takeshita	October 13, 2025	King of Pro-Wrestling	Tokyo, Japan	1	83	1		
87	Yota Tsuji	January 4, 2026	Wrestle Kingdom 20	Tokyo, Japan	1	90	1	This was a Winner Takes All match in which Tsuji's IWGP Global Heavyweight Championship was also on the line. On January 6, at the post Wrestle Kingdom 20 and New Year Dash!! press conference, Tsuji officially retired the IWGP World Heavyweight Championship, declaring himself the IWGP Heavyweight Champion and retroactively merging the lineage of the two titles.	
88	Callum Newman	April 4, 2026	Sakura Genesis	Tokyo, Japan	1	71	1		
89	Yota Tsuji	June 14, 2026	Dominion 6.14 in Osaka-jo Hall	Osaka, Japan	2	139+	2		

== Combined reigns ==
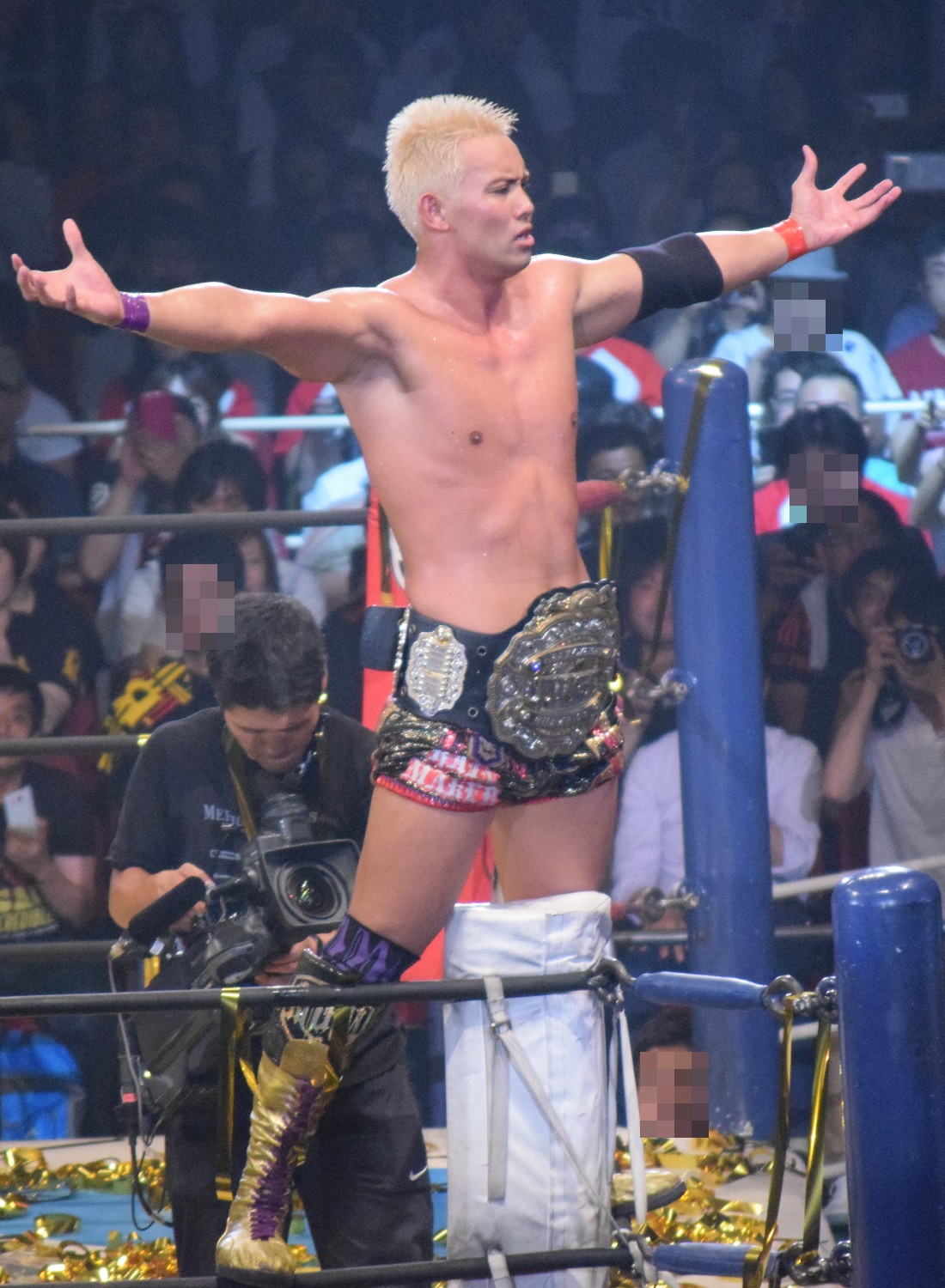
Seven-time champion Kazuchika Okada holds the records for the longest reign (720 days; 65th), combined tenure (2,043 days), most single-reign defenses (12; 65th), and most combined defenses (36)

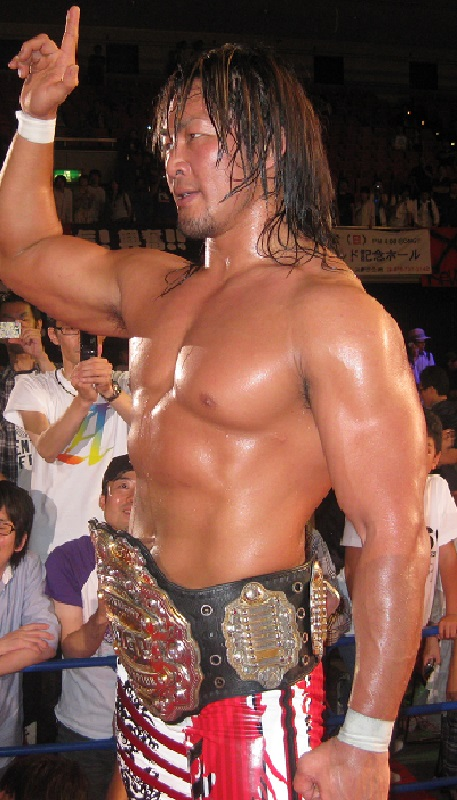
Record eight-time champion Hiroshi Tanahashi

Rank	Wrestler	No. of reigns	Combined defenses	Combined days
1	Kazuchika Okada	7	36	2,043
2	Hiroshi Tanahashi	8	28	1,396
3	Keiji Muto/The Great Muta	4	19	1,238
4	Shinya Hashimoto	3	20	1,052
5	Tatsumi Fujinami	6	13	785
6	Kensuke Sasaki	5	11	647
7	Tetsuya Naito	5	6	592
8	Yuji Nagata	2	12	570
9	Kazuyuki Fujita	3	3	478
10	Big Van Vader	3	4	451
11	Shinsuke Nakamura	3	9	390
12	Riki Choshu	3	5	383
13	Antonio Inoki	1	4	325
14	AJ Styles	2	3	307
15	Brock Lesnar	1	3	280
16	Sanada	1	4	271
17	Jay White	2	2	260
18	Yota Tsuji †	2	3	229+
19	Zack Sabre Jr.	2	6	226
20	Shingo Takagi	1	3	211
21	Kenny Omega	1	3	209
22	Hiroyoshi Tenzan	4	2	197
23	Yoshihiro Takayama	1	3	185
24	Satoshi Kojima	2	2	168
25	Togi Makabe	1	3	161
26	Hirooki Goto	1	7	138
27	Scott Norton	2	4	126
28	Nobuhiko Takada	1	1	116
29	Kota Ibushi	1	3	90
30	Konosuke Takeshita	1	1	83
31	Jon Moxley	1	4	79
32	Callum Newman	1	1	71
33	Bob Sapp	1	1	66
34	Evil	1	1	48
34	Tadao Yasuda	1	1	48
34	Salman Hashimikov	1	0	48
37	Will Ospreay	1	1	46
38	Manabu Nakanishi	1	0	45
39	Masahiro Chono	1	0	44
40	Genichiro Tenryu	1	0	25

== See also ==
- G1 Climax
- New Japan Cup
- IWGP Heavyweight Championship (original version)
- IWGP Heavyweight Championship (IGF)

== Footnotes ==
Sporting positions
Preceded by IWGP Heavyweight Championship (original version)	New Japan Pro-Wrestling's top heavyweight championship 1987–2021; 2026–present	Succeeded by IWGP World Heavyweight Championship
Preceded by IWGP World Heavyweight Championship	New Japan Pro-Wrestling's top heavyweight championship 1987–2021; 2026–present	Succeeded by Current
