= Wrestling Dontaku 2025 =

2025 New Japan Pro-Wrestling professional wrestling event

Wrestling Dontaku
- Promotional poster of the event
- Promotion: New Japan Pro-Wrestling
- Date: May 3–4, 2025
- City: Fukuoka, Japan
- Venue: Fukuoka Kokusai Center
- Attendance: Night 1: 2,903; Night 2: 5,407

Event chronology
← Previous; Windy City Riot	Next → Resurgence

Wrestling Dontaku chronology
← Previous; 2024	Next → 2026

Wrestling Dontaku 2025 was a two-night professional wrestling event promoted by New Japan Pro-Wrestling (NJPW). The event took place on May 3 and 4, 2025, in Fukuoka, at the Fukuoka Kokusai Center. It was the 20th event under the Wrestling Dontaku name.

The event was also notable for the final NJPW matches of Tetsuya Naito and Bushi as they would depart the company after the event.

== Storylines ==
Wrestling Dontaku featured professional wrestling matches that involved different wrestlers from pre-existing scripted feuds and storylines. Wrestlers portrayed villains, heroes, or less distinguishable characters in the scripted events that built tension and culminated in a wrestling match or series of matches.

== Night 1 (May 3) ==
=== Event ===
The event started with the preshow singles confrontation between Daiki Nagai and Katsuya Murashima solded with the victory of the latter. In the first main card bout, Master Wato, Oleg Boltin, Toru Yano and Yoh picked up a victory over Hartley Jackson, Kosei Fujita, Robbie Eagles and Ryohei Oiwa in eight-man tag team competition. Next up, Tomohiro Ishii, Taichi, Taka Michinoku and Yuya Uemura defeated Bushi, Hiromu Takahashi, Tetsuya Naito and Yota Tsuji in another eight-man tag team competition bout. The fourth match saw Ryusuke Taguchi, Hirooki Goto and Yoshi-Hashi picked up a victory over Callum Newman, Great-O-Khan and Jakob Austin Young in six-man tag team competition. Next up, El Phantasmo and Konosuke Takeshita wrestled into a time-limit draw for the NJPW World Television Championship, rendering Phantasmo as the title retainer, having scored the first successful defense of the NJPW World Television Championship in that respective reign. The sixth bout saw Zack Sabre Jr. defeat Hiroshi Tanahashi in one of the latter's retirement road bouts. Next up, Shingo Takagi defeated Shota Umino in singles competition.

In the main event, Bullet Club War Dogs (David Finlay, Clark Connors, Drilla Moloney, Gabe Kidd and Taiji Ishimori) defeated House of Torture (Evil, Ren Narita, Sanada, Sho and Yoshinobu Kanemaru) in a loser leaves stable Dog Pound match. House of Torture members were kicked out of the Bullet Club in the process following the stipulation.

=== Results ===
No.	Results	Stipulations	Times
1^{P}	Katsuya Murashima defeated Daiki Nagai by submission	Singles match	7:26
2	Master Wato, Oleg Boltin, Toru Yano and Yoh defeated TMDK (Hartley Jackson, Kosei Fujita, Robbie Eagles and Ryohei Oiwa) by pinfall	Eight-man tag team match	8:40
3	Tomohiro Ishii and Just 4 Guys (Taichi, Taka Michinoku and Yuya Uemura) defeated Los Ingobernables de Japon (Bushi, Hiromu Takahashi, Tetsuya Naito and Yota Tsuji) by pinfall	Eight-man tag team match	9:03
4	Ryusuke Taguchi and Bishamon (Hirooki Goto and Yoshi-Hashi) defeated United Empire (Callum Newman, Great-O-Khan and Jakob Austin Young) by pinfall	Six-man tag team match	10:43
5	El Phantasmo (c) vs. Konosuke Takeshita ended in a time-limit draw	Singles match for the NJPW World Television Championship	15:00
6	Zack Sabre Jr. defeated Hiroshi Tanahashi by pinfall	Singles match	13:07
7	Shingo Takagi defeated Shota Umino by pinfall	Singles match	15:07
8	Bullet Club War Dogs (David Finlay, Clark Connors, Drilla Moloney, Gabe Kidd and Taiji Ishimori) defeated House of Torture (Evil, Ren Narita, Sanada, Sho and Yoshinobu Kanemaru) by pinfall	Dog Pound match Since House of Torture lost, they were forced to leave Bullet Club.	26:17
(c) / – the champion(s) heading into the match; P / – the match was broadcast on the pre-show

== Night 2 (May 4) ==
=== Event ===
In the preshow tag team bout, Hitamaru Sasaki and Jet Wei from Kyushu Pro-Wrestling faced Katsuya Murashima and Ryusuke Taguchi in a losing effort.

In the first main card bout, Gedo and Taiji Ishimori picked up a victory over Batten Burabura and Mentai Kid in tag team competition. Next up, Master Wato and Yoshi-Hashi outmatched Great-O-Khan and Jakob Austin Young in tag team action. The fourth bout saw World Wonder Ring Stardom's Maika, Hazuki and Koguma defeat Starlight Kid, AZM and Yuna Mizumori in six-woman tag team competition. Next up, El Phantasmo and Oleg Boltin picked up a victory over Konosuke Takeshita and Rocky Romero in tag team competition. In the sixth bout, Hiroshi Tanahashi, Toru Yano, Ryota Chikuzen, Tajiri and Yoh defeated Hartley Jackson, Kosei Fujita, Robbie Eagles, Ryohei Oiwa and Zack Sabre Jr. in ten-man tag team competition as one of Tanahashi's retirement road matches. Next up, Bushi, Hiromu Takahashi, Shingo Takagi and Tetsuya Naito defeated Taichi, Taka Michinoku, Shota Umino and Tomohiro Ishii in eight-man tag team competition which represented Naito and Bushi's last match in NJPW before their departures.

In the semi main event, Yota Tsuji defeated Yuya Uemura to secure the fourth consecutive defense of the IWGP Global Heavyweight Championship in that respective reign. After the bout concluded, Tetsuya Naito passed the leadership of Los Ingobernables de Japon to Tsuji. Gabe Kidd stepped up to challenge Tsuji for the Global title in a match which was scheduled to take place at Dominion 6.15 in Osaka-jo Hall.

In the main event, Hirooki Goto defeated Callum Newman to secure the fifth consecutive defense of the IWGP World Heavyweight Championship in that respective reign. After the bout concluded, Zack Sabre Jr. challenged Goto for the title. Shingo Takagi also stepped up for a challenge, demanding that he would face the winner between Goto and Sabre for the title.

=== Results ===
No.	Results	Stipulations	Times
1^{P}	Katsuya Murashima and Ryusuke Taguchi defeated Hitamaru Sasaki and Jet Wei by pinfall	Tag team match	9:06
2	Bullet Club War Dogs (Gedo and Taiji Ishimori) defeated Batten Burabura and Mentai Kid by pinfall	Tag team match	6:00
3	Master Wato and Yoshi-Hashi defeated United Empire (Great-O-Khan and Jakob Austin Young) by pinfall	Tag team match	8:49
4	Fukuoka Triple Crazy (Maika, Hazuki and Koguma) defeated Yuna Mizumori and Star Bomb (Starlight Kid and AZM) by pinfall	Stardom exhibition six-woman tag team match	9:14
5	El Phantasmo and Oleg Boltin (with Jado) defeated The Don Callis Family (Konosuke Takeshita and Rocky Romero) by pinfall	Tag team match	8:04
6	Ryota Chikuzen, Tajiri, Yoh and Be-Bop Tag Team (Hiroshi Tanahashi and Toru Yano) defeated TMDK (Hartley Jackson, Kosei Fujita, Robbie Eagles, Ryohei Oiwa and Zack Sabre Jr.) b pinfall	Ten-man tag team match	10:22
7	Los Ingobernables de Japon (Bushi, Hiromu Takahashi, Shingo Takagi and Tetsuya Naito) defeated Shota Umino, Tomohiro Ishii and Just 4 Guys (Taichi and Taka Michinoku) by pinfall	Eight-man tag team match	10:05
8	Yota Tsuji (c) defeated Yuya Uemura by pinfall	Singles match for the IWGP Global Heavyweight Championship	23:43
9	Hirooki Goto (c) defeated Callum Newman by pinfall	Singles match for the IWGP World Heavyweight Championship	24:01
(c) / – the champion(s) heading into the match; P / – the match was broadcast on the pre-show
