= New Year Dash!! =

- NJPW New Year Dash!! logo used since 2020
- Promotions: New Japan Pro-Wrestling
- First event: New Year Dash!! (2014)

New Year Dash!! is a professional wrestling event held annually by New Japan Pro-Wrestling (NJPW). It is held every year the day after Wrestle Kingdom, the biggest show of the year for New Japan, starting at Wrestle Kingdom 8 in 2014. There have been eight events under the name held so far, with the traditional January 5 date. In 2020 and 2021, with Wrestle Kingdom a two-night event, New Year Dash!! was held on January 6. The event was not held in 2022. After it was confirmed that Wrestle Kingdom would return to a one-day event for 2023, the event returned to its original January 5 date.

== Production ==
=== Background ===
New Year Dash!! is traditionally held at Korakuen Hall, a prestigious venue right next to the Tokyo Dome, where Wrestle Kingdom is held. The 2020 edition, however, was held at Ota City General Gymnasium due to the event being the official retirement ceremony for Jyushin Thunder Liger. The 2021 edition was held at Tokyo Dome City Hall, another venue right next to the Dome.

=== Storylines ===
New Year Dash!! features professional wrestling matches that involved different wrestlers from pre-existing scripted feuds and storylines. Wrestlers portray villains, heroes, or less distinguishable characters in scripted events that built tension and culminated in a wrestling match or series of matches. New Year Dash!! is the night were New Japan Pro-Wrestling starts many new storylines and feuds after most have ended the night before at Wrestle Kingdom. Dash!! is an exciting show, where fans tune in to see how the promotion will start the year in terms of stories leading into the New Beginning shows. Because of its "reset"-like nature after the company's biggest show of the year, many fans see Dash!! as NJPW's equivalent to the first Raw after WrestleMania in WWE.

== Date and venues ==
| Event | Date | City | Venue | Main event |
|---|---|---|---|---|
| New Year Dash!! (2014) | January 5, 2014 | Tokyo, Japan | Korakuen Hall | Captain New Japan, Hirooki Goto, Hiroshi Tanahashi, and Tetsuya Naito vs. Chaos (Shinsuke Nakamura, Kazuchika Okada, Tomohiro Ishii, and Yoshi-Hashi) |
| New Year Dash!! (2015) | January 5, 2015 | Tokyo, Japan | Korakuen Hall | Bullet Club (AJ Styles, Doc Gallows, Karl Anderson, and Yujiro Takahashi) vs. Hirooki Goto, Hiroshi Tanahashi, Katsuyori Shibata and Tetsuya Naito |
| New Year Dash!! (2016) | January 5, 2016 | Tokyo, Japan | Korakuen Hall | Toru Yano and The Briscoes (Jay Briscoe and Mark Briscoe) (c) vs. Bullet Club (Bad Luck Fale, Nick Jackson and Matt Jackson) for the NEVER Openweight 6-Man Tag Team Championship |
| New Year Dash!! (2017) | January 5, 2017 | Tokyo, Japan | Korakuen Hall | Los Ingobernables de Japón (Evil, Bushi, and Sanada) (c) vs. Hiroshi Tanahashi, Manabu Nakanishi, and Ryusuke Taguchi for the NEVER Openweight 6-Man Tag Team Championship |
| New Year Dash!! (2018) | January 5, 2018 | Tokyo, Japan | Korakuen Hall | Los Ingobernables de Japón (Evil, Bushi, Sanada, Hiromu Takahashi, and Tetsuya Naito) vs. Chaos (Kazuchika Okada, Hirooki Goto, Gedo, Will Ospreay, and Yoshi-Hashi) |
| New Year Dash!! (2019) | January 5, 2019 | Tokyo, Japan | Korakuen Hall | Bullet Club (Jay White, Bad Luck Fale, and Gedo) vs. Hiroshi Tanahashi and Chaos (Kazuchika Okada and Yoshi-Hashi) |
| New Year Dash!! (2020) | January 6, 2020 | Tokyo, Japan | Ota City General Gymnasium | Los Ingobernables de Japón (Sanada and Tetsuya Naito) vs. Bullet Club (Jay White and Kenta) |
| New Year Dash!! (2021) | January 6, 2021 | Tokyo, Japan | Tokyo Dome City Hall | Los Ingobernables de Japón (Tetsuya Naito, Sanada, Shingo Takagi, Hiromu Takahashi, and Bushi) vs. Master Wato, Golden Ace (Kota Ibushi and Hiroshi Tanahashi) and Roppongi 3K (Rocky Romero and Sho) |
| New Year Dash!! (2023) | January 5, 2023 | Tokyo, Japan | Ota City General Gymnasium | Kazuchika Okada and Kenny Omega vs. United Empire (Aaron Henare and Jeff Cobb) |
| New Year Dash!! (2024) | January 5, 2024 | Tokyo, Japan | Sumida City Gymnasium | TMDK (Zack Sabre Jr., Kosei Fujita, Shane Haste and Mikey Nicholls) vs Chaos (Tomohiro Ishii and Kazuchika Okada) and Blackpool Combat Club (Jon Moxley and Bryan Danielson) |
| New Year Dash!! (2025) | January 6, 2025 | Tokyo, Japan | Ota City General Gymnasium | Chaos (Rocky Romero, Yoh, Hirooki Goto and Yoshi-Hashi) vs. TMDK (Zack Sabre Jr., Ryohei Oiwa, Kosei Fujita and Robbie Eagles)) |
| New Year Dash!! (2026) | January 5, 2026 | Tokyo, Japan | Ota City General Gymnasium | Knock Out Brothers (Oskar and Yuto-Ice) (c) vs. TMDK (Zack Sabre Jr. and Ryohei Oiwa) for the IWGP Tag Team Championship |

== Results ==
=== 2014 ===
New Year Dash!! (2014)
- Promotion: New Japan Pro-Wrestling
- Date: January 5, 2014
- City: Tokyo, Japan
- Venue: Korakuen Hall
- Attendance: 2,015

Pay-per-view chronology
| ← Previous; Wrestle Kingdom 8 | Next → Fantastica Mania 2014 |

New Year Dash!! chronology
| ← Previous; First | Next → 2015 |

| No. | Results | Stipulations | Times |
|---|---|---|---|
| 1 | Time Splitters (Alex Shelley & Kushida) defeated The Young Bucks (Matt Jackson & Nick Jackson), Suzuki-gun (Taichi & Taka Michinoku), and Forever Hooligans (Alex Koslov & Rocky Romero) | Four-way tag team match | 7:01 |
| 2 | Minoru Suzuki defeated Sho Tanaka | Singles match | 4:30 |
| 3 | Chaos (Jado, Takashi Iizuka, Toru Yano & Yujiro Takahashi) defeated Manabu Nakanishi, Super Strong Machine, Yohei Komatsu & Yuji Nagata | Eight-man tag team match | 11:16 |
| 4 | El Desperado & Jyushin Thunder Liger defeated Bushi & Kota Ibushi | Tag team match | 8:22 |
| 5 | Bullet Club (Bad Luck Fale & Prince Devitt) defeated Great Bash Heel (Togi Makabe & Tomoaki Honma) | Tag team match | 9:43 |
| 6 | Suzuki-gun (Killer Elite Squad (Davey Boy Smith Jr. and Lance Archer) & Shelton Benjamin) defeated Bullet Club (Gallows and Anderson (Doc Gallows and Karl Anderson) & Tama Tonga) | Six-man tag team match | 11:50 |
| 7 | The IronGodz (Jax Dane & Rob Conway) (c) defeated Tencozy (Hiroyoshi Tenzan & Satoshi Kojima) | Tag team match for the NWA World Tag Team Championship | 11:29 |
| 8 | Captain New Japan, Hirooki Goto, Hiroshi Tanahashi & Tetsuya Naito defeated Chaos (Kazuchika Okada, Chaos Invincibles (Shinsuke Nakamura and Tomohiro Ishii) & Yoshi-Hashi) | Eight-man tag team match | 20:30 |
(c) / – the champion(s) heading into the match

=== 2015 ===
New Year Dash!! (2015)
- Promotion: New Japan Pro-Wrestling
- Date: January 5, 2015
- City: Tokyo, Japan
- Venue: Korakuen Hall
- Attendance: 1,995

Pay-per-view chronology
| ← Previous; Wrestle Kingdom 9 | Next → Fantastica Mania 2015 |

New Year Dash!! chronology
| ← Previous; 2014 | Next → 2016 |

| No. | Results | Stipulations | Times |
|---|---|---|---|
| 1 | Suzuki-gun (Taichi & Taka Michinoku) defeated Sho Tanaka & Tiger Mask | Tag team match | 7:29 |
| 2 | reDRagon (Bobby Fish & Kyle O'Reilly) defeated Forever Hooligans (Alex Koslov & Rocky Romero) | Tag team match | 10:30 |
| 3 | Suzuki-gun (Killer Elite Squad (Davey Boy Smith Jr. and Lance Archer), Minoru Suzuki, Shelton Benjamin & Takashi Iizuka) defeated Tencozy (Hiroyoshi Tenzan & Satoshi Kojima), Captain New Japan, Manabu Nakanishi & Tomoaki Honma | Ten-man tag team match | 11:59 |
| 4 | Jyushin Thunder Liger (c) defeated El Desperado | Singles match for the NWA World Junior Heavyweight Championship | 16:56 |
| 5 | Time Splitters (Alex Shelley & Kushida) & Ryusuke Taguchi defeated Bullet Club (Kenny Omega and The Young Bucks (Matt Jackson & Nick Jackson)) | Six-man tag team match | 9:16 |
| 6 | Bullet Club (Bad Luck Fale & Tama Tonga) defeated Chaos (Kazuchika Okada & Toru Yano) | Tag team match | 10:17 |
| 7 | Kota Ibushi, Togi Makabe & Yuji Nagata defeated Chaos (Shinsuke Nakamura, Tomohiro Ishii & Yoshi-Hashi) | Six-man tag team match | 13:58 |
| 8 | Bullet Club (AJ Styles, The Good Brothers (Doc Gallows and Karl Anderson) & Yujiro Takahashi) (with Cody Hall) defeated Hirooki Goto, Hiroshi Tanahashi, Katsuyori Shibata & Tetsuya Naito | Eight-man tag team match | 14:45 |
(c) / – the champion(s) heading into the match

=== 2016 ===
New Year Dash!! (2016)
- Promotion: New Japan Pro-Wrestling
- Date: January 5, 2016
- City: Tokyo, Japan
- Venue: Korakuen Hall
- Attendance: 1,726

New Japan Pro-Wrestling events chronology
| ← Previous; Wrestle Kingdom 10 | Next → Fantastica Mania 2016 |

New Year Dash!! chronology
| ← Previous; 2015 | Next → 2017 |

| No. | Results | Stipulations | Times |
|---|---|---|---|
| 1 | Manabu Nakanishi, Ryusuke Taguchi, Shiro Koshinaka, Sho Tanaka & Yuji Nagata defeated Cheeseburger, Jyushin Thunder Liger, Tiger Mask, Yohei Komatsu & Yoshiaki Fujiwara | Ten-man tag team match | 10:13 |
| 2 | Matt Sydal & Ricochet defeated David Finlay & Jay White | Tag team match | 6:46 |
| 3 | Jay Lethal (with Truth Martini) defeated Juice Robinson | Singles match | 7:11 |
| 4 | Bullet Club (The Good Brothers (Doc Gallows and Karl Anderson), Tama Tonga & Yujiro Takahashi) & King Haku defeated Great Bash Heel (Togi Makabe & Tomoaki Honma), Kushida & Tencozy (Hiroyoshi Tenzan & Satoshi Kojima) | Ten-man tag team match | 11:10 |
| 5 | Los Ingobernables de Japón (Bushi, Evil & Tetsuya Naito) defeated Hiroshi Tanahashi, Mascara Dorada & Michael Elgin | Six-man tag team match | 11:57 |
| 6 | Bullet Club (AJ Styles & Kenny Omega) defeated Chaos (Shinsuke Nakamura & Yoshi-Hashi) | Tag team match | 12:01 |
| 7 | Hirooki Goto, Katsuyori Shibata & reDRagon (Bobby Fish & Kyle O'Reilly) defeated Chaos (Roppongi Vice (Beretta and Rocky Romero) and Chaos Invincibles (Kazuchika Okada & Tomohiro Ishii)) | Eight-man tag team match | 13:19 |
| 8 | The Briscoes (Jay Briscoe & Mark Briscoe) & Toru Yano (c) defeated Bullet Club (Bad Luck Fale and The Young Bucks Matt Jackson & Nick Jackson) | Six-man tag team match for the NEVER Openweight 6-Man Tag Team Championship | 11:02 |
(c) / – the champion(s) heading into the match

=== 2017 ===
New Year Dash!! (2017)
- Promotion: New Japan Pro-Wrestling
- Date: January 5, 2017
- City: Tokyo, Japan
- Venue: Korakuen Hall
- Attendance: 1,738

Pay-per-view chronology
| ← Previous; Wrestle Kingdom 11 | Next → Fantastica Mania 2017 |

New Year Dash!! chronology
| ← Previous; 2016 | Next → 2018 |

| No. | Results | Stipulations | Times |
|---|---|---|---|
| 1 | David Finlay, Kyle O'Reilly & Ricochet defeated Henare, Jyushin Thunder Liger & Tiger Mask | Six-man tag team match | 6:16 |
| 2 | Dick and Balls (Hangman Page & Yujiro Takahashi) defeated Billy Gunn & Yoshitatsu | Tag team match | 6:39 |
| 3 | Chaos (Roppongi Vice (Beretta and Rocky Romero) & Yoshi-Hashi) defeated Superkliq (Adam Cole, Matt Jackson & Nick Jackson) | Six-man tag team match | 9:59 |
| 4 | Team 2000 (Hiro Saito, Hiroyoshi Tenzan, Satoshi Kojima & Scott Norton) & Cheeseburger defeated Bullet Club (Bad Luck Fale, Bone Soldier, Kenny Omega and Guerillas of Destiny (Tama Tonga & Tanga Loa)) | Ten-man tag team match | 9:57 |
| 5 | Kushida & Michael Elgin defeated Los Ingobernables de Japón (Hiromu Takahashi & Tetsuya Naito) | Tag team match | 13:45 |
| 6 | Great Bash Heel (Togi Makabe & Tomoaki Honma), Juice Robinson, Katsuyori Shibata & Yuji Nagata defeated Chaos (Hirooki Goto, Chaos Invincibles (Kazuchika Okada and Tomohiro Ishii), Toru Yano & Will Ospreay) | Ten-man tag team match | 14:54 |
| 7 | Hiroshi Tanahashi, Manabu Nakanishi & Ryusuke Taguchi defeated Los Ingobernables de Japón (Bushi, Evil & Sanada) (c) | Six-man tag team match for the NEVER Openweight 6-Man Tag Team Championship | 13:24 |
(c) / – the champion(s) heading into the match

=== 2018 ===
New Year Dash!! (2018)
- Promotion: New Japan Pro-Wrestling
- Date: January 5, 2018
- City: Tokyo, Japan
- Venue: Korakuen Hall
- Attendance: 1,737

Pay-per-view chronology
| ← Previous; Wrestle Kingdom 12 | Next → Fantastica Mania 2018 |

New Year Dash!! chronology
| ← Previous; 2017 | Next → 2019 |

| No. | Results | Stipulations | Times |
|---|---|---|---|
| 1 | Tencozy (Hiroyoshi Tenzan & Satoshi Kojima), Manabu Nakanishi & Yuji Nagata defeated Ren Narita, Shota Umino, Tetsuhiro Yagi & Tomoyuki Oka | Eight-man tag team match | 7:09 |
| 2 | Suzuki-gun (El Desperado, Taichi, Taka Michinoku, Takashi Iizuka & Yoshinobu Kanemaru) defeated Hirai Kawato, Jyushin Thunder Liger, Tiger Mask, Toa Henare & Togi Makabe | Ten-man tag team match | 8:49 |
| 3 | Jay White defeated Katsuya Kitamura | Singles match | 7:31 |
| 4 | Bullet Club (Kenny Omega and The Young Bucks (Matt Jackson & Nick Jackson)) defeated Roppongi 3K (Sho & Yoh) & Cheeseburger (with Rocky Romero) | Six-man tag team match | 11:19 |
| 5 | Bullet Club Elite (Chase Owens, Cody, Leo Tonga, Marty Scurll & Yujiro Takahashi) (with Brandi Rhodes) defeated FinJuice (David Finlay and Juice Robinson), Kota Ibushi, Kushida & Ryusuke Taguchi | Ten-man tag team match | 13:20 |
| 6 | Bullet Club (Bad Luck Fale and Guerillas of Destiny (Tama Tonga & Tanga Loa)) defeated Chaos (Beretta, Tomohiro Ishii & Toru Yano) (c) | Six-man tag team match for the NEVER Openweight 6-Man Tag Team Championship | 14:40 |
| 7 | Suzuki-gun (Killer Elite Squad (Davey Boy Smith Jr. and Lance Archer), Minoru Suzuki & Zack Sabre Jr.) defeated War Machine (Hanson & Raymond Rowe), Hiroshi Tanahashi & Michael Elgin | Eight-man tag team match | 11:36 |
| 8 | Los Ingobernables de Japón (Bushi, Evil, Hiromu Takahashi, Sanada & Tetsuya Naito) defeated Chaos (Gedo, Hirooki Goto, Will Ospreay & Chaos Ride the Lightning (Kazuchika Okada and Yoshi-Hashi)) | Ten-man tag team match | 13:50 |
(c) / – the champion(s) heading into the match

=== 2019 ===
New Year Dash!! (2019)
- Promotion: New Japan Pro-Wrestling
- Date: January 5, 2019
- City: Tokyo, Japan
- Venue: Korakuen Hall
- Attendance: 1,730

Pay-per-view chronology
| ← Previous; Wrestle Kingdom 13 | Next → Fantastica Mania 2019 |

New Year Dash!! chronology
| ← Previous; 2018 | Next → 2020 |

| No. | Results | Stipulations | Times |
|---|---|---|---|
| 1 | Roppongi 3K (Rocky Romero, Sho & Yoh) defeated Suzuki-gun (Killer Elite Squad (Davey Boy Smith Jr., Lance Archer) & Takashi Iizuka) | Six-man tag team match | 8:34 |
| 2 | Bullet Club (Chase Owens & Yujiro Takahashi) defeated Toa Henare & Tomoaki Honma | Tag team match | 9:24 |
| 3 | FinJuice (David Finlay & Juice Robinson) defeated Best Friends (Beretta & Chuckie T) by disqualification | Tag team match | 9:02 |
| 4 | Chaos (Hirooki Goto, Tomohiro Ishii & Will Ospreay) defeated Jeff Cobb, Kushida & Yuji Nagata | Six-man tag team match | 14:09 |
| 5 | Bullet Club (Taiji Ishimori and Guerillas of Destiny (Tama Tonga & Tanga Loa)) (c) defeated Ryusuke Taguchi, Togi Makabe & Toru Yano | Six-man tag team match for the NEVER Openweight 6-Man Tag Team Championship | 11:33 |
| 6 | Suzuki-gun (El Desperado, Minoru Suzuki, Taichi, Yoshinobu Kanemaru & Zack Sabre Jr.) defeated Los Ingobernables de Japón (Bushi, Evil, Sanada, Shingo Takagi & Tetsuya Naito) | Ten-man tag team match | 14:45 |
| 7 | Bullet Club O.G. (Bad Luck Fale, Gedo & Jay White) defeated Chaos Ride the Lightning (Kazuchika Okada & Yoshi-Hashi) & Hiroshi Tanahashi | Six-man tag team match | 15:16 |
(c) / – the champion(s) heading into the match

=== 2021 ===
New Year Dash!! (2021)
- Promotion: New Japan Pro-Wrestling
- Date: January 6, 2021
- City: Tokyo, Japan
- Venue: Tokyo Dome City Hall
- Attendance: 1,019

Pay-per-view chronology
| ← Previous; Wrestle Kingdom 15 | Next → Road to The New Beginning |

New Year Dash!! chronology
| ← Previous; 2020 | Next → 2023 |

| No. | Results | Stipulations | Times |
|---|---|---|---|
| 1 | Yuji Nagata defeated Gabriel Kidd by submission | Singles match | 7:59 |
| 2 | Suzuki-gun (Minoru Suzuki & Douki) defeated Tiger Mask & Yuya Uemura | Tag team match | 10:45 |
| 3 | United Empire (Will Ospreay, Great-O-Khan & Jeff Cobb) defeated Tencozy (Hiroyoshi Tenzan & Satoshi Kojima) & Yota Tsuji | Six-man tag team match | 9:44 |
| 4 | Bullet Club (Guerrillas of Destiny (Tama Tonga & Tanga Loa) and Bullet Club's Cutest Tag Team Taiji Ishimori & El Phantasmo)) defeated Suzuki-gun (Dangerous Tekkers (Taichi & Zack Sabre Jr.), El Desperado & Yoshinobu Kanemaru) | Eight-man tag team match | 11:35 |
| 5 | Chaos (Kazuchika Okada, Toru Yano, Hirooki Goto, Tomohiro Ishii & Yoshi-Hashi) defeated Bullet Club (Jay White, Evil, Yujiro Takahashi and General's Jewel (Bad Luck Fale and Chase Owens)) | Ten-man tag team match | 13:47 |
| 6 | Los Ingobernables de Japón (Sanada, Shingo Takagi, Tetsuya Naito, Hiromu Takahashi & Bushi) defeated Golden Ace (Kota Ibushi & Hiroshi Tanahashi), Roppongi 3K (Rocky Romero & Sho) & Master Wato | Ten-man tag team match | 17:23 |

=== 2023 ===
New Year Dash!! (2023)
- Promotion: New Japan Pro-Wrestling
- Date: January 5, 2023
- City: Tokyo, Japan
- Venue: Ota City General Gymnasium
- Attendance: 2,713

Event chronology
| ← Previous; Wrestle Kingdom 17 | Next → The New Beginning in Nagoya |

New Year Dash!! chronology
| ← Previous; 2021 | Next → — |

| No. | Results | Stipulations | Times |
|---|---|---|---|
| 1 | House of Torture (Evil, Yujiro Takahashi and Dick Togo) defeated Tomoaki Honma, Tiger Mask and Ren Narita by pinfall | Six-man tag team match | 8:26 |
| 2 | Taichi, Yoshinobu Kanemaru and Douki defeated United Empire (Will Ospreay, TJP and Francesco Akira) by pinfall | Six-man tag team match | 9:17 |
| 3 | TMDK (Zack Sabre Jr., Mikey Nicholls and Shane Haste) defeated Chaos (Tomohiro Ishii, Hirooki Goto and Yoshi-Hashi) by pinfall | Six-man tag team match | 8:02 |
| 4 | Shota Umino, Togi Makabe, Ryusuke Taguchi and Yoh defeated Los Ingobernables de Japon (Tetsuya Naito, Sanada, Bushi and Hiromu Takahashi) by pinfall | Eight-man tag team match | 13:17 |
| 5 | Guerrillas of Destiny (Hikuleo and Tama Tonga), Hiroshi Tanahashi and Master Wato defeated Bullet Club (El Phantasmo, Jay White, Kenta and Taiji Ishimori) by disqualification | Eight-man tag team match | 11:29 |
| 6 | Shingo Takagi defeated Sho, Great-O-Khan and Toru Yano by pinfall | Four-way match to determine the inaugural Provisional KOPW 2023 Champion | 12:50 |
| 7 | Kazuchika Okada and Kenny Omega defeated United Empire (Aaron Henare and Jeff Cobb) by pinfall | Tag team match | 13:36 |

=== 2024 ===
New Year Dash!! (2024)
- Promotion: New Japan Pro-Wrestling
- Date: January 5, 2024
- City: Tokyo, Japan
- Venue: Sumida City Gymnasium
- Attendance: 2,910

Event chronology
| ← Previous; Wrestle Kingdom 18 | Next → Battle in the Valley |

New Year Dash!! chronology
| ← Previous; 2023 | Next → 2025 |

| No. | Results | Stipulations | Times |
|---|---|---|---|
| 1 | Hiroshi Tanahashi (c) defeated Ryusuke Taguchi by pinfall | Singles match for the NJPW World Television Championship | 5:40 |
| 2 | Bishamon (Hirooki Goto and Yoshi-Hashi) defeated Ryohei Oiwa and Kaito Kiyomiya by pinfall | Tag team match | 7:40 |
| 3 | Guerrillas of Destiny (El Phantasmo and Hikuleo) defeated Oskar Leube and Yuto Nakashima by pinfall | Tag team match | 8:06 |
| 4 | Great Bash Heel (Togi Makabe and Tomoaki Honma), El Desperado, Master Wato, Tama Tonga, and Shota Umino defeated House of Torture (Dick Togo, Yujiro Takahashi, Ren Narita, Sho, Yoshinobu Kanemaru, and Evil) by pinfall | Twelve-man tag team match | 9:02 |
| 5 | United Empire (Will Ospreay, Jeff Cobb, Henare and Catch 2/2 (TJP and Francesco Akira)) vs. Bullet Club War Dogs (David Finlay, Alex Coughlin, Gabriel Kidd, Drilla Moloney and Clark Connors) ended in a no contest | Ten-man tag team match | 5:10 |
| 6 | Just 5 Guys (Sanada, Douki, Yuya Uemura, Taichi and Taka Michinoku) defeated Los Ingobernables de Japon (Bushi, Hiromu Takahashi, Yota Tsuji, Shingo Takagi and Tetsuya Naito) by pinfall | Ten-man tag team match | 8:47 |
| 7 | Taiji Ishimori defeated Great-O-Khan, Toru Yano and Yoh | Four-way match to determine the inaugural Provisional KOPW 2024 Champion | 10:00 |
| 8 | TMDK (Zack Sabre Jr., Kosei Fujita, Shane Haste and Mikey Nicholls) defeated Chaos (Tomohiro Ishii and Kazuchika Okada) and Blackpool Combat Club (Jon Moxley and Bryan Danielson) by pinfall | Eight-man tag team match | 13:50 |
(c) / – the champion(s) heading into the match

=== 2025 ===
New Year Dash!! (2025)
- Promotion: New Japan Pro-Wrestling
- Date: January 6, 2025
- City: Tokyo, Japan
- Venue: Ota City General Gymnasium
- Attendance: 2,348

Event chronology
| ← Previous; Wrestle Dynasty | Next → Battle in the Valley |

New Year Dash!! chronology
| ← Previous; 2024 | Next → — |

| No. | Results | Stipulations | Times |
|---|---|---|---|
| 1^{P} | Yuji Nagata and TenKoji (Hiroyoshi Tenzan and Satoshi Kojima) defeated Daiki Nagai, Katsuya Murashima, and Shoma Kato by submission | Six-man tag team match | 8:51 |
| 2 | Josh Barnett vs. Oleg Boltin ended in a time limit draw | Exhibition match | 5:00 |
| 3 | United Empire (TJP, Great-O-Khan, Francesco Akira, Jeff Cobb, and Jakob Austin Young) defeated El Phantasmo, Jado, Master Wato, Shota Umino, and Tomoaki Honma by pinfall | Ten-man tag team match | 10:49 |
| 4 | House of Torture (Ren Narita, Yoshinobu Kanemaru, Yujiro Takahashi, and Sho) defeated Tiger Mask, Togi Makabe, and Be-Bop Tag Team (Toru Yano and Hiroshi Tanahashi) by pinfall | Eight-man tag team match | 7:47 |
| 5 | Bullet Club War Dogs (Clark Connors and Sanada) defeated Just 4 Guys (Taichi and Taka Michinoku) by submission | Tag team match | 9:30 |
| 6 | El Desperado and Kushida defeated Bullet Club (Kenta and Taiji Ishimori) by submission | Tag team match | 9:08 |
| 7 | Los Ingobernables de Japon (Bushi, Shingo Takagi, Yota Tsuji, and Titán) defeated Bullet Club War Dogs (David Finlay, Drilla Moloney, Gabe Kidd, and Gedo) by pinfall | Eight-man tag team match | 11:59 |
| 8 | Los Ingobernables de Japón (Tetsuya Naito and Hiromu Takahashi) defeated Funky Sauce (Alex Zayne and Ryusuke Taguchi) by pinfall | Tag team match | 8:36 |
| 9 | Bishamon (Hirooki Goto and Yoshi-Hashi) and Roppongi ReVice (Rocky Romero and Yoh) defeated TMDK (Zack Sabre Jr., Ryohei Oiwa, Kosei Fujita and Robbie Eagles) by pinfall | Eight-man tag team match | 18:34 |
P / – the match was broadcast on the pre-show

=== 2026 ===
New Year Dash!! (2026)
- Promotion: New Japan Pro-Wrestling
- Date: January 5, 2026
- City: Tokyo, Japan
- Venue: Ota City General Gymnasium
- Attendance: 3,523

Event chronology
| ← Previous; Wrestle Kingdom 20 | Next → The New Beginning in Osaka |

New Year Dash!! chronology
| ← Previous; 2025 | Next → — |

| No. | Results | Stipulations | Times |
|---|---|---|---|
| 1 | Team 150 (Tomohiro Ishii, Taichi, and Satoshi Kojima) defeated Katsuya Murashima and RoughStorm (Shota Umino and Yuya Uemura) by submission | Six-man tag team match | 10:23 |
| 2 | The Don Callis Family (Konosuke Takeshita and Rocky Romero) defeated El Phantasmo and Shoma Kato (with Jado) by submission | Tag team match | 8:44 |
| 3 | Boltin Oleg and Bishamon (Hirooki Goto and Yoshi-Hashi) defeated House of Torture (Sanada, Yujiro Takahashi and Yoshinobu Kanemaru) by pinfall | Six-man tag team match | 9:32 |
| 4 | United Empire (Andrade El Ídolo, Francesco Akira, and Jakob Austin Young) defeated Hiromu Takahashi and Bullet Club War Dogs (Gabe Kidd and Clark Connors) by pinfall | Six-man tag team match | 10:38 |
| 5 | Aaron Wolf, Toru Yano and Spiritech (Master Wato and Yoh) defeated House of Torture (Evil, Ren Narita, Don Fale, and Dick Togo) by submission | Eight-man tag team match | 5:53 |
| 6 | United Empire (Callum Newman, Great-O-Khan, Henare, and Jake Lee) defeated Bullet Club War Dogs (David Finlay and Drilla Moloney) and Unaffiliated (Shingo Takagi and Yota Tsuji) (with Gedo) by pinfall | Eight-man tag team match | 9:11 |
| 7 | Ichiban Sweet Boys (Robbie Eagles and Kosei Fujita) defeated Douki and Sho (c), El Desperado and Kuukai and Bullet Club (Taiji Ishimori and Robbie X) by pinfall | Four-way tag team match for the IWGP Junior Heavyweight Tag Team Championship | 7:30 |
| 8 | Knock Out Brothers (Oskar and Yuto-Ice) (c) defeated TMDK (Zack Sabre Jr. and Ryohei Oiwa) (with Hartley Jackson) by pinfall | Tag team match for the IWGP Tag Team Championship | 26:22 |
(c) / – the champion(s) heading into the match
