= Bishamon (professional wrestling) =

Professional wrestling tag team

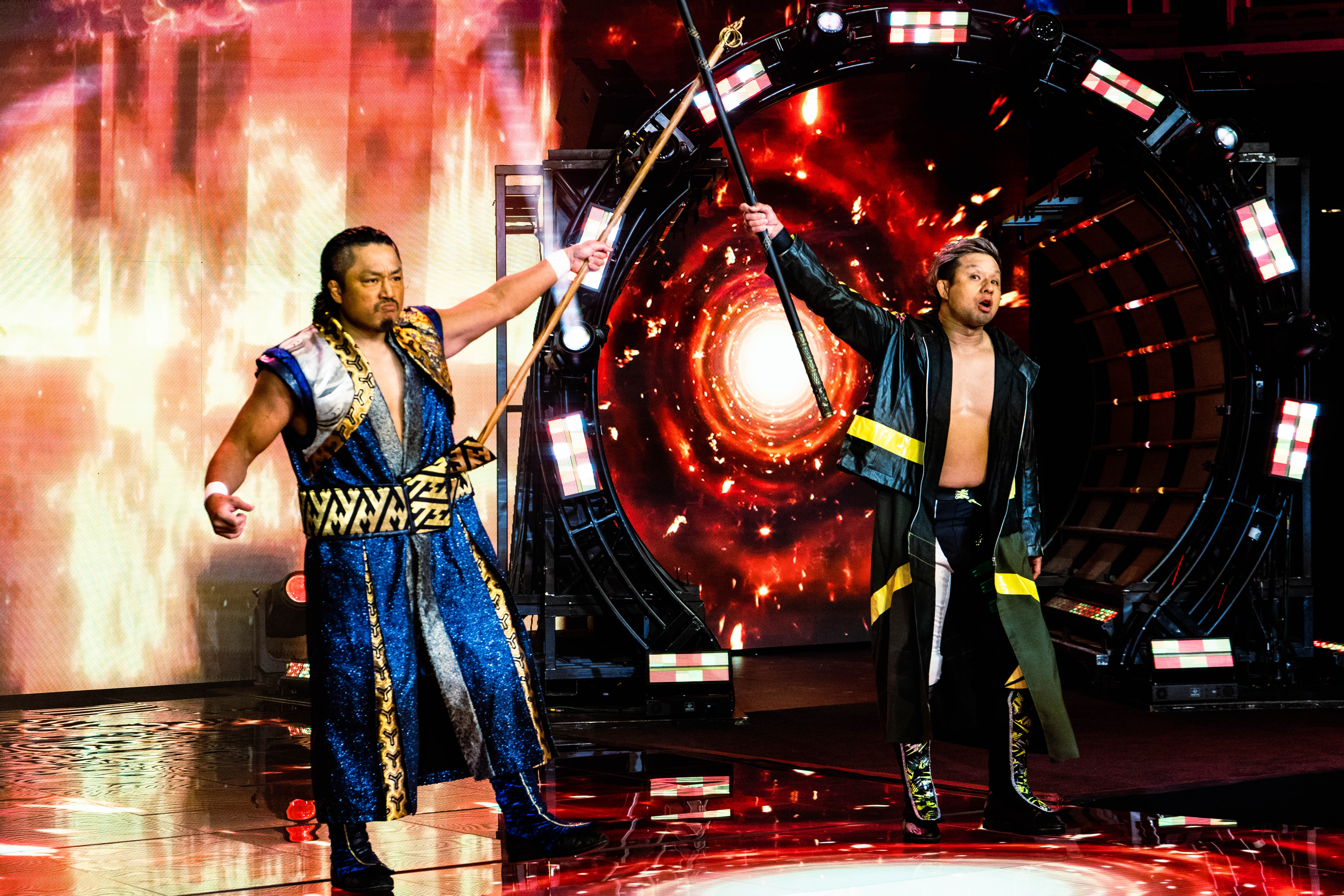
- Hirooki Goto (left) and Yoshi-Hashi (right) in 2022

Tag team
- Name: Bishamon
- Members: Hirooki Goto; Yoshi-Hashi
- Billed heights: Goto: 6 ft 0 in (1.83 m); Yoshi-Hashi: 5 ft 11 in (1.80 m)
- Combined billed weight: 205 kg (452 lb)
- Debut: October 23, 2020
- Years active: 2020–present

Bishamon (毘沙門) is a professional wrestling tag team consisting of Hirooki Goto and Yoshi-Hashi. They currently perform in New Japan Pro-Wrestling (NJPW), where they are also members of the Goto Revolutionary Army alongside Tatsuya Matsumoto.

In NJPW, Goto is a former IWGP World Heavyweight Champion. As a tag team, they are former four-time IWGP Tag Team Champions, former three-time NEVER Openweight Six-Man Tag Team Champions and three-time World Tag League winners. They were formerly a sub-group of the Chaos stable.

== History ==
=== Formation ===
Hirooki Goto and Yoshi-Hashi first teamed as a duo during the second night of NJPW's Kizuna Road of 2016 defeating Evil and Sanada, and a year later, they teamed up together for the 2017 World Tag League, where they ended up fourth in their block with 8 points. In October 2020, Goto, Yoshi-Hashi and their Chaos stablemate Tomohiro Ishii began feuding with Suzuki-gun, leading to a title match for the NEVER Openweight 6-Man Tag Team Championship. On October 23 at Road to Power Struggle: Night 1, Goto, Yoshi-Hashi and Ishii successfully defended the NEVER Openweight 6-Man Tag Team Championship against Suzuki-gun's Douki, Taichi and Zack Sabre Jr. Afterwards, Yoshi-Hashi stated that he wanted to win the IWGP Tag Team Championship with Goto. On November 11 during the Road to Power Struggle: Night 8 show, Goto and Yoshi-Hashi unsuccessfully challenged Dangerous Tekkers (Taichi and Zack Sabre Jr.) for the IWGP Tag Team Championship.

=== Championship pursuits and breakthroughs (2020–present) ===
On August 1 at Summer Struggle: Night 13, Goto, Yoshi-Hashi and Tomohiro Ishii successfully defended the NEVER Openweight 6-Man Tag Team Championship against Suzuki-gun's Taichi, Sabre and Minoru Suzuki. On September 5 at Wrestle Grand Slam in MetLife Dome, Goto and Yoshi-Hashi failed to win the IWGP Tag Team Championship in a three-way match involving Dangerous Tekkers and Los Ingobernables de Japon (Tetsuya Naito and SANADA).

The team won their first World Tag League in 2021 and defeated Taichi and Sabre to win the IWGP Tag Team Championship on the first night of Wrestle Kingdom 16. Afterwards, their team was dubbed as "Bishamon" in reference to the Japanese mythology, of the Buddhist guardian of the north, who was one of the Shichi-fuku-jin ("Seven Gods of Luck"). They lost the titles to United Empire's Great-O-Khan and Jeff Cobb on April 9 at Hyper Battle. They also had a brief reign with Yoh as NEVER Openweight 6-Man Tag Team Champions. Bishamon also won the 2022 edition of World Tag League, making them the fifth team to win the tournament in back-to-back years.

On January 4, 2023, at Wrestle Kingdom 17, Goto and Yoshi-Hashi defeated FTR (Cash Wheeler and Dax Harwood) to win the IWGP Tag Team Championship for the second time. They lost the titles to Aussie Open on April 8 at Sakura Genesis in their third title defense. On June 4 at Dominion 6.4 in Osaka-jo Hall, Goto and Yoshi-Hashi defeated Evil and Yujiro Takahashi and United Empire's Henare and Great-O-Khan in three-way match to win the vacant IWGP and Strong Openweight Tag Team Championship. On July 4 at NJPW Independence Day, Bishamon lost the Strong Openweight Tag Team Championship to Bullet Club War Dogs' Gabe Kidd and Alex Coughlin. The following night in a rematch, the duo defeated Coughlin and Kidd to retain the IWGP Tag Team Championship. From November 25 until December 6, Goto and Yoshi-Hashi took part in the 2023 World Tag League, finishing the tournament with a record of four wins, one draw and two losses, advancing to the semifinals of the tournament. On December 8, Goto and Yoshi-Hashi defeated Gabe and Coughlin and then Hikuleo and El Phantasmo, on December 10 in the semifinals and the finals respectively to win the 2023 World Tag League, becoming the first team to win the tournament for three consecutive years. Afterwards, they used their champions privilege to choose their opponents for Wrestle Kingdom 18, challenging the Hikuleo and Phantasmo to a match, for both IWGP and Hikuleo and Phantasmo's Strong Openweight Tag Team Championship in a Winner Takes All match. At the event, on January 4, 2024, Bishamon lost the IWGP Tag Team Championship to Hikuleo and Phantasmo. In March, Goto made it to the finals of the 2024 New Japan Cup, before losing to Yota Tsuji on March 20. On April 6 at Sakura Genesis, Bishamon defeated Bullet Club's Kenta and Chase Owens to win the IWGP Tag Team Championship for the fourth time, before losing the titles back to them on May 4 at Wrestling Dontaku. Their feud culminated in a four way tornado tag team elimination Winners Take All match for both the IWGP Tag Team Championship and Strong Openweight Tag Team Championship on June 9 at Dominion 6.9 in Osaka-jo Hall also involving Guerrillas of Destiny (Hikuleo and El Phantasmo) and TMDK (Mikey Nicholls and Shane Haste), which they failed to win.

On January 4, 2025 at Wrestle Kingdom 19 in Tokyo Dome, Goto won the New Japan Ranbo by last eliminating Great-O-Khan to become the number one contender to the IWGP World Heavyweight Championship. In the month ahead, Goto teased that it would be his final chance at the title, considering it was his tenth overall challenge for the main singles title (after the IWGP Heavyweight Championship) in over 17 years. On February 11, 2025 at The New Beginning in Osaka, Goto defeated Zack Sabre Jr. to win IWGP World Heavyweight Championship and his first world title in NJPW. On June 29, 2025, Goto lost the IWGP World Heavyweight Championship back to Sabre at Tanahashi Jam, ending his reign at 138 days. On July 5, 2025, Goto withdrew from G1 Climax 35 as a result of an elbow injury.

== Championships and accomplishments ==
- New Japan Pro-Wrestling
  - IWGP World Heavyweight Championship (1 time) – Goto
  - NEVER Openweight 6-Man Tag Team Championship (3 times) – with Tomohiro Ishii (1), Yoh (1) and Boltin Oleg (1)
  - IWGP Tag Team Championship (4 times)
  - Strong Openweight Tag Team Championship (1 time)
  - World Tag League (2021, 2022, 2023)
- Tokyo Sports
  - Best Tag Team Award (2023)
  - Best Bout Award (2024) Goto vs. Yota Tsuji on March 20
