= Destruction in Kobe (2026) =

2026 New Japan Pro-Wrestling event

- Promotional poster of the event
- Promotion: New Japan Pro-Wrestling
- Date: September 27, 2026
- City: Kobe, Japan
- Venue: Kobe World Memorial Hall
- Attendance: 4,870

Event chronology
← Previous; G1 Climax 36	Next → King of Pro-Wrestling

Destruction chronology
← Previous; Kobe (2025)	Next → —

Destruction in Kobe was a professional wrestling event promoted by New Japan Pro-Wrestling (NJPW) that took place at Kobe World Memorial Hall in Kobe, Japan on September 27, 2026. It was the twenty-eighth event in the Destruction chronology.

== Production ==
=== Storylines ===
Destruction in Kobe features professional wrestling matches that will involve different wrestlers from pre-existing scripted feuds and storylines. Wrestlers portrayed villains, heroes, or less distinguishable characters in the scripted events that built tension and culminated in a wrestling match or series of matches.

On July 18, at day 2 of the G1 Climax, Hirooki Goto defeated the IWGP Heavyweight Champion Yota Tsuji in their tournament Block match. At the G1 finals on August 16, Goto challenged Tsuji for the title which the match being set for Destruction.

At Dominion 6.14 in Osaka-jo Hall, Drilla Moloney would lose a three-way match for IWGP Global Heavyweight Championship which also involved champion Andrade El Idolo and Shota Umino. After the match, Gabe Kidd attacked eventual winner Umino while Moloney stood out of the ring and watch; Umino would lose the title to Kidd in the following weeks. On day 2 of the G1 Climax, Moloney would defeat Kidd in their block match. At the G1 Climax finals, Moloney and Shingo Takagi defeated Kidd and his Death Riders teammate Wheeler Yuta, after a match for between Kidd and Moloney for IWGP Global Heavyweight Championship was schelued for Destruction in Kobe.

On the July 2 episode of AEW Collision, Takagi and Moloney was defeated by Claudio Castagnoli and PAC in the opening match. Takagi would enter the G1 Climax only to end up in the bottom three of A Block with 8 points. After winning his tag team match with Moloney against Kidd and Wheeler at the G1 finals, Takagi blamed his lost to Castagnoli at Collision for ruining his momentum leading into the G1 and challenged him to a match at Kobe. On September 9 at a Road to Destruction event, Castagnoli accepted Takagi's challenge via video.

== Results ==
No.	Results	Stipulations	Times
1	Shota Umino, Boltin Oleg, Místico, El Desperado and Toru Yano defeated House of Torture (Ren Narita, Sanada, Douki, Sho and Dick Togo) by pinfall	Ten-man tag team match	8:29
2	Yoh, Master Wato and Ryusuke Taguchi defeated Unbound Co. (Taiji Ishimori, Robbie X and Gedo) by pinfall	Six-man tag team match	3:36
3	Unbound Co. (Yuto-Ice, Oskar and Daiki Nagai) defeated United Empire (Henare, Great-O-Khan and Zane Jay) by pinfall	Six-man tag team match	9:42
4	TMDK (Zack Sabre Jr. and Ryohei Oiwa) defeated Aaron Wolf and Taichi by pinfall	Tag team match	10:08
5	Callum Newman defeated Jeff Cobb by pinfall	Singles match	13:56
6	Shun Skywalker defeated Konosuke Takeshita (c) by pinfall	Singles match for the NJPW World Television Championship	10:14
7	Shingo Takagi (with Daiki Nagai) defeated Claudio Castagnoli by pinfall	Singles match	15:43
8	Gabe Kidd (c) defeated Drilla Moloney by pinfall	Singles match for the IWGP Global Heavyweight Championship	19:37
9	Yota Tsuji (c) defeated Hirooki Goto by pinfall	Singles match for the IWGP Heavyweight Championship	24:01
(c) / – the champion(s) heading into the match
