= The New Beginning in Osaka (2025) =

2025 professional wrestling event

- Promotional poster
- Promotion: New Japan Pro-Wrestling
- Date: February 11, 2025
- City: Osaka, Japan
- Venue: Osaka Prefectural Gymnasium
- Attendance: 5,502

Event chronology
← Previous; Battle in the Valley	Next → NJPW 53rd Anniversary Show

The New Beginning chronology
← Previous; Sapporo (2024)	Next → Osaka (2026)

The New Beginning in Osaka was a professional wrestling event promoted by New Japan Pro-Wrestling (NJPW). The event took place on February 11, 2025, in Osaka at the Osaka Prefectural Gymnasium. It was the forty-first event under the New Beginning name and the ninth to take place in Osaka.

== Production ==
=== Storylines ===
The New Beginning in Osaka featured professional wrestling matches that involves different wrestlers from pre-existing scripted feuds and storylines. Wrestlers portrayed villains, heroes, or less distinguishable characters in scripted events that built tension and culminated in a wrestling match or series of matches.

On the pre-show at Wrestle Kingdom 19, Hirooki Goto won the New Japan Ranbo earning him a IWGP World Heavyweight Championship match. IWGP World Heavyweight champion Zack Sabre Jr. would successfully defend the title in the main event against Shota Umino and on the following night at Wrestle Dynasty against Ricochet. On January 7, 2025, the title match between Sabre and Goto was set for The New Beginning in Osaka.

=== Event ===
The event started with the tag team confrontation between El Desperado and Katsuya Murashima, and Francesco Akira and Jeff Cobb, solded with the victory of the latter team. Next up, Hiroshi Tanahashi picked up a victory over Togi Makabe in singles competition. The third bout saw Drilla Moloney defeating Shingo Takagi. Next up, Great-O-Khan defeated Shota Umino in a Hair vs. Hair match after which Umino refused to let O-Khan shave his head as he did it himself instead. Next up, Sanada defeated Taichi in singles competition. In the sixth bout, Robbie Eagles and Kosei Fujita defeated Rocky Romero and Yoh to secure the first successful defense of the IWGP Junior Heavyweight Tag Team Championship in that respective reign. After the bout concluded, Taiji Ishimori announced himself and Robbie X as the next challengers. Next up, Konosuke Takeshita defeated Boltin Oleg to secure the third consecutive defense of the NEVER Openweight Championship in that respective reign. After the bout concluded, Ryohei Oiwa stepped up as the next challenger. The eighth bout saw 2024 World Tag League winners Tetsuya Naito and Hiromu Takahashi defeating Matthew Jackson and Nicholas Jackson to win the IWGP Tag Team Championship. Takahashi became the first junior heavyweight wrestler since 1987 until the time of the event to hold a heavyweight championship in NJPW. In the semi main event, Yota Tsuji fought Gabe Kidd into a double knockout to secure the second consecutive defense of the IWGP Global Heavyweight Championship. After the bout concluded, Evil returned to action as the House of Torture contingent of the Bullet Club attacked Gabe Kidd, declaring that they cut ties with the War Dogs sub-unit.

In the main event, Hirooki Goto defeated Zack Sabre Jr. to win the IWGP World Heavyweight Championship, ending the latter's reign at 120 days and four defenses.

== Results ==
No.	Results	Stipulations	Times
1^{P}	United Empire (Francesco Akira and Jeff Cobb) defeated El Desperado and Katsuya Murashima by pinfall	Tag team match	8:20
2	Hiroshi Tanahashi defeated Togi Makabe by pinfall	Singles match	9:24
3	Drilla Moloney defeated Shingo Takagi by pinfall	Singles match	10:40
4	Great-O-Khan defeated Shota Umino by pinfall	Singles match	9:38
5	Sanada (with Taiji Ishimori) defeated Taichi (with Taka Michinoku) by pinfall	Singles match	8:35
6	Ichiban Sweet Boys (Robbie Eagles and Kosei Fujita) (c) (with Hartley Jackson) defeated Chaos (Rocky Romero and Yoh) by pinfall	Tag team match for the IWGP Junior Heavyweight Tag Team Championship	11:43
7	Konosuke Takeshita (c) defeated Boltin Oleg by pinfall	Singles match for the NEVER Openweight Championship	11:33
8	Los Ingobernables de Japon (Tetsuya Naito and Hiromu Takahashi) defeated The Young Bucks (Matthew Jackson and Nicholas Jackson) (c) by pinfall	Tag team match for the IWGP Tag Team Championship	9:48
9	Yota Tsuji (c) vs. Gabe Kidd ended in a double knockout	Singles match for the IWGP Global Heavyweight Championship	21:24
10	Hirooki Goto (with Yoshi-Hashi) defeated Zack Sabre Jr. (c) (with Ryohei Oiwa, Hartley Jackson, Robbie Eagles and Kosei Fujita) by pinfall	Singles match for the IWGP World Heavyweight Championship	20:07
(c) / – the champion(s) heading into the match; P / – the match was broadcast on the pre-show
