= Wrestling Dontaku 2026 =

2026 New Japan Pro-Wrestling professional wrestling event

Wrestling Dontaku
- Promotional poster of the event
- Promotion: New Japan Pro-Wrestling
- Date: May 3–4, 2026
- City: Fukuoka, Japan
- Venue: Fukuoka Kokusai Center
- Attendance: Night 1: 2,477; Night 2: 3,603

Event chronology
| ← Previous; Death Vegas Invitational | Next → Best of the Super Jr. 33 |

Wrestling Dontaku chronology
| ← Previous; 2025 | Next → — |

Wrestling Dontaku 2026 was a two-night professional wrestling event promoted by New Japan Pro-Wrestling (NJPW). The event took place on May 3 and 4, 2026, in Fukuoka, at the Fukuoka Kokusai Center. It was the 21st event under the Wrestling Dontaku name.

== Storylines ==
Wrestling Dontaku featured professional wrestling matches that involved different wrestlers from pre-existing scripted feuds and storylines. Wrestlers portrayed villains, heroes, or less distinguishable characters in the scripted events that built tension and culminated in a wrestling match or series of matches.

== Night 1 ==
=== Results ===
May 3
| No. | Results | Stipulations | Times |
|---|---|---|---|
| 1 | Toru Yano, Yoh, and Master Wato defeated Tiger Mask, Ryusuke Taguchi, and Taisei Nakahara by pinfall | Six-man tag team match | 5:14 |
| 2 | Knock Out Brothers (Yuto-Ice and Oskar) defeated Tomoaki Honma and Masatora Yasuda by knockout | Tag team match | 3:15 |
| 3 | Yuya Uemura, Taichi, El Desperado, and Místico and Yuya Uemura defeated TMDK (Ryohei Oiwa, Hartley Jackson, Robbie Eagles, and Kosei Fujita) by pinfall | Eight-man tag team match | 10:29 |
| 4 | United Empire (Will Ospreay, Henare, and Great-O-Khan) defeated Goto Revolutionary Army (Hirooki Goto, Yoshi-Hashi, and Tatsuya Matsumoto) by pinfall | Six-man tag team match | 10:08 |
| 5 | Konosuke Takeshita and Shota Umino defeated House of Torture (Chase Owens and Yujiro Takahashi) by pinfall | Tag team match | 11:19 |
| 6 | Unbound Co. (Shingo Takagi, Drilla Moloney, Taiji Ishimori, Robbie X, and Daiki Nagai) defeated United Empire (Callum Newman, Jake Lee, Francesco Akira, Jakob Austin Young, and Zane Jay) by pinfall | Ten-man tag team match | 10:32 |
| 7 | Aaron Wolf defeated Don Fale by pinfall | Singles match | 10:35 |
| 8 | Ren Narita (c) (with Dick Togo) defeated Boltin Oleg by submission | Singles match for the NEVER Openweight Championship | 15:20 |
| 9 | Andrade El Ídolo defeated Yota Tsuji (c) by pinfall | Singles match for the IWGP Global Heavyweight Championship | 32:56 |
(c) / – the champion(s) heading into the match

== Night 2 ==
=== Results ===
May 4
| No. | Results | Stipulations | Times |
|---|---|---|---|
| 1^{P} | Masatora Yasuda defeated Taisei Nakahara by submission | Singles match | 7:10 |
| 2 | Konosuke Takeshita (c) defeated Chase Owens (with Yujiro Takahashi) by pinfall | Singles match for the NJPW World Television Championship | 11:33 |
| 3 | Unbound Co. (Gedo and Daiki Nagai) defeated Ryusuke Taguchi and Tatsuya Matsumoto by pinfall | Tag team match | 6:49 |
| 4 | Knock Out Brothers (Yuto-Ice and Oskar) defeated Shota Umino and Tomoaki Honma by submission | Tag team match | 9:01 |
| 5 | Aaron Wolf, Toru Yano, Tiger Mask, Yoh, and Master Wato defeated House of Torture (Ren Narita, Don Fale, Yujiro Takahashi, Sho, and Yoshinobu Kanemaru) (with Dick Togo) by pinfall | Ten-man tag team match | 9:43 |
| 6 | Yuya Uemura and Taichi defeated TMDK (Ryohei Oiwa and Hartley Jackson) by pinfall | Tag team match | 13:49 |
| 7 | Unbound Co. (Yota Tsuji, Drilla Moloney, Taiji Ishimori, and Robbie X) defeated United Empire (Jake Lee, Francesco Akira, Jakob Austin Young, and Zane Jay) by submission | Eight-man tag team match | 8:33 |
| 8 | El Desperado and Místico defeated Ichiban Sweet Boys (Robbie Eagles and Kosei Fujita) (c) by submission | Tag team match for the IWGP Junior Heavyweight Tag Team Championship | 20:23 |
| 9 | United Empire (Will Ospreay, Henare, and Great-O-Khan) defeated Bishamon-tin (Boltin Oleg, Hirooki Goto and Yoshi-Hashi) (c) by pinfall | Six-man tag team match for the NEVER Openweight 6-Man Tag Team Championship | 24:06 |
| 10 | Callum Newman (c) defeated Shingo Takagi by pinfall | Singles match for the IWGP Heavyweight Championship | 35:29 |
(c) / – the champion(s) heading into the match; P / – the match was broadcast on the pre-show
