= Yō =

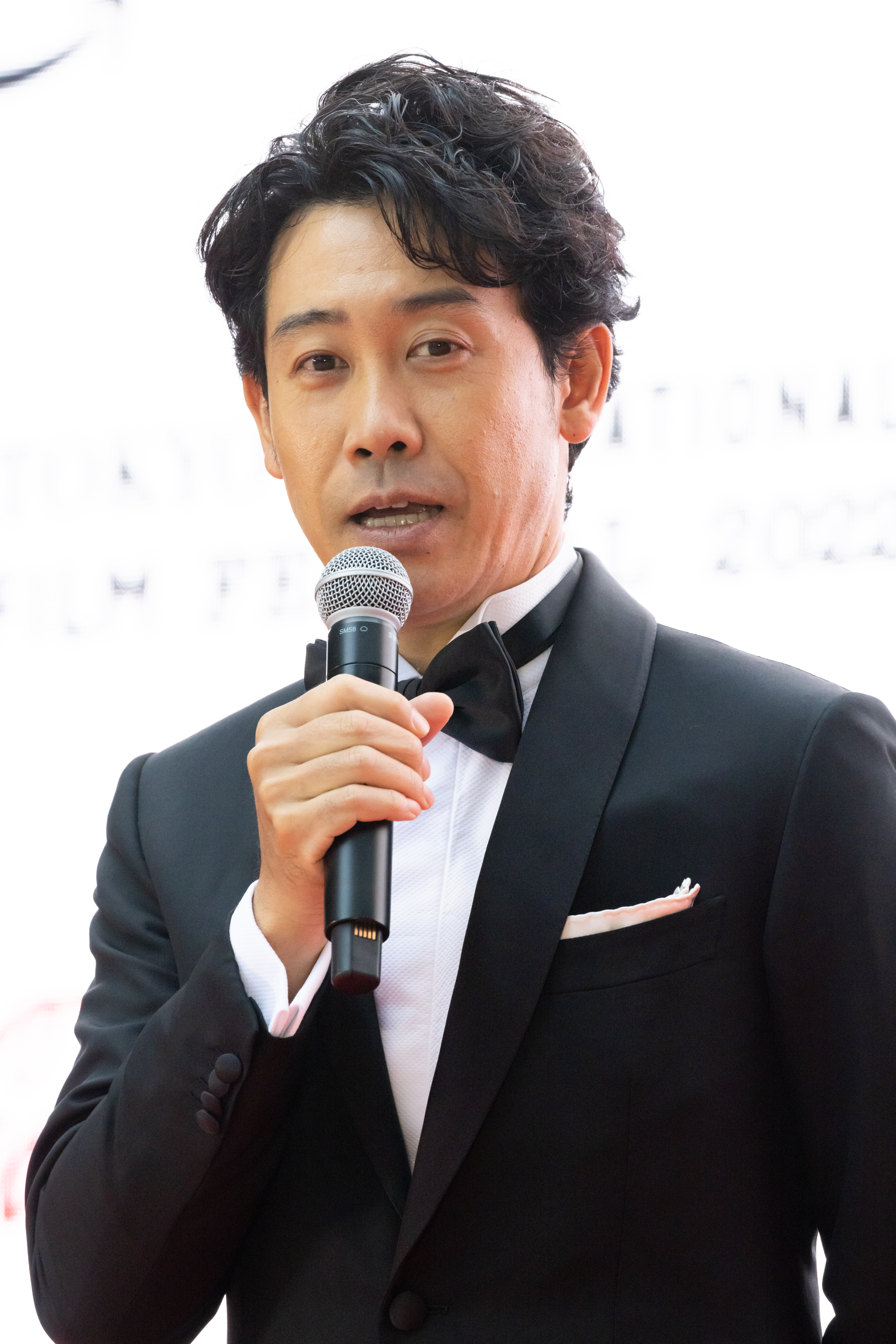
- Yo Oizumi, Japanese actor
- Pronunciation: joɯ (IPA)
- Gender: Unisex

Origin
- Origin: Japanese
- Meaning: Different meanings depending on the kanji used

Other names
- Alternative spelling: Yô (Kunrei-shiki) Yô (Nihon-shiki) Yō, Yo, You (Hepburn)

Yō, Yo, You or Yoh is a unisex (usually masculine) Japanese given name.

== Written forms ==
Yō can be written using different kanji characters. Some examples:

- 洋, "ocean"
- 羊, "sheep"
- 瑶, "precious stone"
- 陽, "sunshine"
- 容, "contain"
- 曜, "weekday"
- 葉, "leaf"
- 要, "essential"
- 蓉, "lotus"
- 庸, "common"
- 楊, "willow"
- 燿, "shine"
- 窯, "kiln"

The name can also be written in hiragana よう or katakana ヨウ.

== Notable people with the name ==
- Yo Akiyama (秋山 陽; born 1953), Japanese artist specializing in ceramics
- Yo Hitoto (一青 窈; born 1976), Japanese singer
- Yo Inoue (井上 瑤; 1946–2003), Japanese voice actress
- Yo Kitazawa (北沢 洋; born 1963), Japanese actor and voice actor
- Yo Kobayashi (小林 洋; born 1981), Japanese roboticist
- Yo Oizumi (大泉 洋; born 1973), Japanese actor
- Yo Taichi (大地 葉; born 1994), Japanese voice actress
- Yo Takeyama (竹山 洋; born 1946), Japanese screenwriter
- Yo Yoshida (吉田 羊; born 1974), Japanese actress
- Yo Yoshimura (吉村 傭; 1954–1991), Japanese voice actor
- Yo Yoshinari (吉成 曜; born 1971), Japanese key animator, storyboard artist, and anime director

== Fictional characters ==
- Yoh Asakura (麻倉 葉), a character in the manga series Shaman King
- Yō Hinomura (火野村 窯), a character in the manga series Crying Freeman
- Yo Shindo (真堂 揺), a character in the manga series My Hero Academia
- Yoh Takami (鷹見 羊), a character in the manga series Deadman Wonderland
- You Watanabe (渡辺曜), a character in the media franchise Love Live! Sunshine!!
- You Kasukabe (春日部 耀), a character in the light novel, manga, and anime series Problem Children Are Coming from Another World, Aren't They?
- Robert Dazai Yo, a character in Daniel Keys Moran's science fiction novel, The Last Dancer

== See also ==
- Yo (greeting)
- Crochet where "yoh", yarn over hook, is a common term.
