= Gabe Kidd =

English professional wrestler (born 1997)

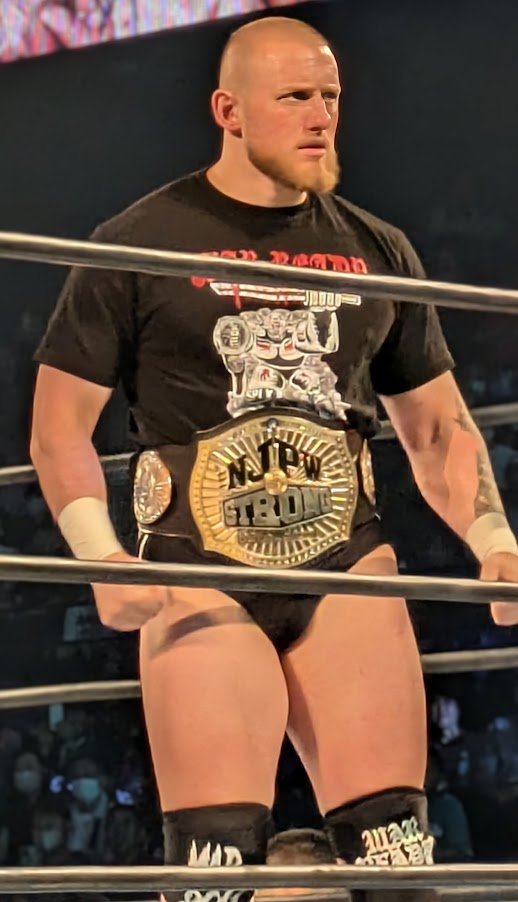
- Kidd in 2024

Personal information
- Born: 24 April 1997 (age 29) Nottingham, England

Professional wrestling career
- Ring names: Gabriel Kidd; Gabe Kidd; Kid Danger
- Billed height: 1.83 m (6 ft 0 in)
- Billed weight: 107 kg (236 lb; 16 st 12 lb)
- Billed from: Nottingham, England
- Trained by: HOP Wrestling Academy; Joseph Conners; Katsuyori Shibata; Marty Jones; NJPW L.A. Dojo; Paul Grint
- Debut: 12 November 2011

Gabriel Michael McMenamin (born 24 April 1997), better known by his ring name Gabe Kidd, is an English professional wrestler. As of March 2026, he is signed to All Elite Wrestling (AEW), where he is a member of the Death Riders stable. He also makes appearances for New Japan Pro-Wrestling (NJPW), where he is the current IWGP Global Heavyweight Champion in his record-tying second reign.

He began his career in 2011 on the British independent scene, working for promotions such as WhatCulture Pro Wrestling (WCPW), where he performed under the name Gabriel Kidd and became a WCPW Internet Champion. In 2020, he signed with NJPW after being recruited by Katsuyori Shibata. In 2023, he joined the Bullet Club War Dogs sub-unit, shortened his name to Gabe Kidd, and would go on to become a IWGP Global Heavyweight Champion, Strong Openweight Champion, and Strong Openweight Tag Team Champion. He departed NJPW in 2026 and signed with AEW, later winning the AEW World Trios Championship with David Finlay and Clark Connors as The Dogs.

== Professional wrestling career ==
=== Early career (2011–2019) ===
McMenamin made his debut in 2011 under the name Kid Danger and at that time, he wrestled under a mask to conceal his age. In 2013, McMenamin switched to the name of Gabriel Kidd.

On 29 April 2017, Kidd won the WCPW Internet Championship, one of the titles of WhatCulture Pro Wrestling, in a triple threat match involving defending champion Cody Rhodes and Joe Hendry. He lost the title to Zack Sabre Jr. on 21 September. On 2 June 2019, Kidd lost to Hendry in a "Loser Leaves Town" match, after which he left Defiant Wrestling.

On 29 June, at a Revolution Pro Wrestling event, Kidd teamed with Kenneth Halfpenny and Shaun Jackson where they defeated Brendan White, NJPW young lions Clark Connors and Karl Fredericks. Katsuyori Shibata, was so impressed with Kidd and he went on to recommend him to NJPW officials, leading Kidd to be signed by NJPW.

=== New Japan Pro-Wrestling (2020–present) ===
==== Young Lion (2020–2023) ====
On 25 January 2020, Kidd made his debut at New Japan Pro-Wrestling. Later the same year, he entered the New Japan Cup and lost to Taiji Ishimori in the first round on 17 June. In early 2022, Kidd took a hiatus from professional wrestling to prioritize his mental health.

On 20 November 2022, at Historic X-Over, Kidd teamed with LA Dojo stablemates, Clark Connors, Kevin Knight and Alex Coughlin to defeat Kosei Fujita, Oskar Leube, Ryohei Oiwa and Yuto Nakashima. A few days later, Coughlin and Kidd teamed together in the World Tag League, where they finished bottom of their block with just 2 points.

==== Bullet Club War Dogs and Unbound Co. (2023–2026) ====
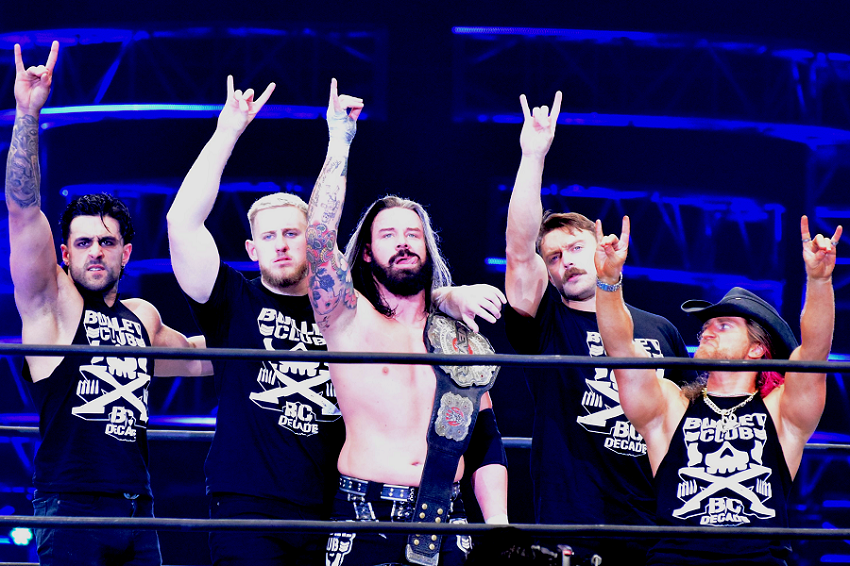
Kidd (second from the left) with other members of the War Dogs sub-group in June 2023

On 4 June 2023, at Dominion, Coughlin and Kidd, branded as Bullet Club War Dogs attacked Bishamon (Hirooki Goto and Yoshi-Hashi), following their victory of capturing both the IWGP Tag Team Championship and the Strong Openweight Tag Team Championships, signalling their challenge for both titles, officially turning both men heel for the first time. The duo later accompanied Bullet Club leader, David Finlay to the ring in Bullet Club shirts, officially joining the stable. On 4 July, night 1 of NJPW Independence Day, Kidd (now under the shortened name Gabe Kidd) and Coughlin defeated Bishamon to win the Strong Openweight Tag Team Championships, marking both men’s first NJPW championships. Later in the month, Kidd participated in the G1 Climax making his tournament debut and competing in the A Block. Before the tournament, at the press conference Kidd attacked fellow A Block participants, Yota Tsuji and Kaito Kiyomiya, causing him to be removed from the conference prematurely. In the tournament, Kidd finished with 5 points, failing to advance to the quarterfinal round. On 9 October at Destruction in Ryōgoku, Kidd and Coughlin lost the Strong Openweight Tag Team Titles to Guerrillas of Destiny (El Phantasmo and Hikuleo), ending their reign at 97 days.

The duo attempted to rebound the following month, entering the annual World Tag League, competing in the A-Block. Kidd and Coughlin finished joint top of their block, with 10 points, advancing to the semi-final round. In the semi-final round, the duo were defeated by Bishamon, eliminating them from the tournament. On 17 March 2024 it was reported that Kidd had re-signed with NJPW. Kidd participated in the 2024 New Japan Cup, where he defeated Callum Newman in the first round, but would be eliminated by Shingo Takagi in the second. At Sakura Genesis, Kidd attacked Takagi after the latter defeated Evil for the NEVER Openweight Championship and cut a worked shoot promo, criticizing NJPW, spitting in the face of NJPW President Hiroshi Tanahashi, and then challenged Takagi for his championship. On night 2 of Wrestling Dontaku, Kidd was unsuccessful in winning the championship from Takagi. On 11 May he defeated Eddie Kingston in a No Ropes Last Man Standing match at Resurgence to become the youngest ever Strong Openweight Champion. On 9 June Kidd appeared in Pro Wrestling Noah, teaming with Jake Lee, who was aligned with Bullet Club War Dogs, to face All Rebellion's Kaito Kiyomiya and Kenoh in a double count out. During the match, Kidd busted open Kiyomiya, though afterwards Kiyomiya got the upper hand and proclaimed that the GHC Heavyweight Championship wasn't for him to own and that he would return the "bloodbath" in their title match. On 16 June at Grand Ship In Yokohama, Kidd unsuccessfully challenged Kiyomiya for the GHC Heavyweight title, ending Bullet Club War Dogs' feud with Kiyomiya's All Rebellion. From 20 July and 14 August, Kidd took part in the 2024 G1 Climax finishing the tournament with a record of four wins and five losses, failing to advance to the play-off match of the tournament. For the 2024 World Tag League, Kidd teamed with the newest War Dogs addition Sanada, where they were placed in A-Block. The duo finished at the top of their block and advanced to the grand finals, where they lost to Tetsuya Naito and Hiromu Takahashi.

On 5 January 2025 at Wrestle Dynasty, Kidd was defeated by Kenny Omega. Kidd then wrestled Yota Tsuji at The New Beginning in Osaka to a double knockout draw, failing to capture the IWGP Global Heavyweight Championship. After the bout concluded, Evil returned to action as the House of Torture contingent of the Bullet Club attacked Kidd, declaring that they cut ties with the War Dogs sub-unit. On 11 April at Windy City Riot, Kidd lost his Strong Openweight title to Tomohiro Ishii in a 30-minute Iron Man match in sudden death overtime 2-1. On 15 June at Dominion 6.15 in Osaka-jo Hall, Kidd captured the IWGP Global Heavyweight Championship by defeating then reigning champion Yota Tsuji. Kidd participated in the 2025 G1 Climax, where he lost his first round match to Konosuke Takeshita, during which he suffered an injury to his right knee. The injury forced him to withdraw from the tournament, forfeiting the rest of his matches. On 13 October at King of Pro-Wrestling, Kidd was defeated by Tsuji via submission, resulting in Tsuji regaining the IWGP Global Heavyweight Championship.

After Wrestle Kingdom 20, at New Year Dash!!, David Finlay and Yota Tsuji announced the dissolution of Bullet Club and Mushozoku, replacing the alliance with Unbound Company, which was a complete merger. On February 11, 2026 at The New Beginning in Osaka, Kidd was defeated Andrade El Idolo in his final match as an NJPW talent. In March 2026, Kidd signed with partner promotion All Elite Wrestling and later confirmed that he had left NJPW, ending his six-year tenure with the promotion.

==== Sporadic appearances (2026–present) ====
On April 4 at Sakura Genesis, Kidd made his first NJPW appearance since leaving the promotion, representing AEW. Following the main event, he attacked his former stablemate Yota Tsuji and challenged him for the IWGP Global Heavyweight Championship. Kidd was originally scheduled to challenge Tsuji for the title at Wrestling Dontaku, but was forced to withdraw from the match on 14 April due to injury and was replaced by Andrade El Idolo. Kidd returned on June 14 at Dominion 6.14 in Osaka-jo Hall, where he attacked the newly crowned Global Heavyweight Champion Shota Umino and challenged him to a title match. During the Road to G1 Climax tour on July 6, Kidd defeated Umino to win his second IWGP Global Heavyweight Championship. From July to August, Kidd competed in the G1 Climax as part of B Block, where he finished with 12 points but failed to advance to the semi-finals due to losing tiebreakers to Callum Newman and Yuya Uemura. Over the following months, Kidd would successfully defend his title against the likes of his former stablemate Drilla Moloney on 27 September at Destruction in Kobe, Shota Umino in a rematch on 12 October at King of Pro-Wrestling, and Taichi on 4 November at Power Struggle.

=== All Elite Wrestling (2024–present) ===
==== Sporadic appearances (2024–2025) ====
Due to the relationship between NJPW and All Elite Wrestling (AEW), Kidd has appeared on both AEW and its sister promotion Ring of Honor (ROH) in 2024 and 2025. During his appearances, Kidd notably aligned himself with the Death Riders (Jon Moxley, Claudio Castagnoli, Pac, Wheeler Yuta, and Marina Shafir) as a "hired mercenary", teaming with and assisting the stable in matches without being recognized as an official member. On 12 July 2025 at AEW's biggest event of the year All In, Kidd teamed with Castagnoli and Yuta to unsuccessfully challenge The Opps (Samoa Joe, Katsuyori Shibata, and Powerhouse Hobbs) for the AEW World Trios Championship.

==== The Dogs and Death Riders (2026–present) ====
In January 2026, Kidd, along with his Unbound Co. stablemate Clark Connors, feuded with Darby Allin. The duo of Kidd and Connors would be known as "The Dogs" (a reference to their former NJPW stable, Bullet Club War Dogs). On the March 4 episode of Dynamite, Kidd and Connors were joined by their former Bullet Club leader David Finlay in The Dogs. It was later announced that all three were now signed to AEW. At Revolution on March 15, The Dogs were defeated by Allin, Orange Cassidy, and Roderick Strong in a tornado trios match. On the following episode of Dynamite, Kidd was defeated by Allin in a coffin match, ending their feud.

On the April 8 tapings of Collision, The Dogs defeated Místico and JetSpeed (Kevin Knight and "Speedball" Mike Bailey) to win the AEW World Trios Championship, marking Kidd's first championship in AEW. AEW officially began recognizing this reign when the episode aired on tape delay on April 11. They then lost the Trios Title to The Conglomeration (Orange Cassidy, Roderick Strong, and Kyle O'Reilly) at Dynasty on April 12, ending their reign at 4 days, although AEW officially recognizes that their reign only lasted one day. During the match, Kidd suffered a legitimate shoulder injury and was later rendered out indefinitely by AEW president Tony Khan in the post-show media scrum. On June 14 at NJPW's Dominion 6.14 in Osaka-jo Hall, Kidd announced that he was now an official member of the Death Riders, while also keeping his status in The Dogs. It was later revealed that Kidd had been off AEW progamming due to visa issues. Kidd returned on the August 19 episode of Dynamite. On August 30 at All In, The Dogs failed to regain the AEW World Trios Championship in a Trios Roulette Royale. On the October 21 episode of Dynamite, Kidd was attacked and kicked out of The Dogs by Finlay and Connors, becoming a full-fledged member of the Death Riders and turning face in the process. Kidd and the Death Riders teamed with the Conglomeration to face the Dogs and Bang Bang Gang – who had merged into a new faction, The Cut – at Full Gear on November 14 in an Anarchy in the Arena match, which they lost.

== Personal life ==
As of March 2026, McMenamin resides in Manhattan, New York. McMenamin has publicly discussed facing mental health struggles throughout his career. At a NJPW Strong event in 2022, he revealed that he had attempted suicide twice while quarantining in Japan during the COVID-19 pandemic and was checked into a psychiatric hospital. McMenamin also revealed that fellow wrestler Hiroshi Tanahashi spent an hour with him every day through video calls while he was being treated in the psychiatric hospital.

== Championships and accomplishments ==
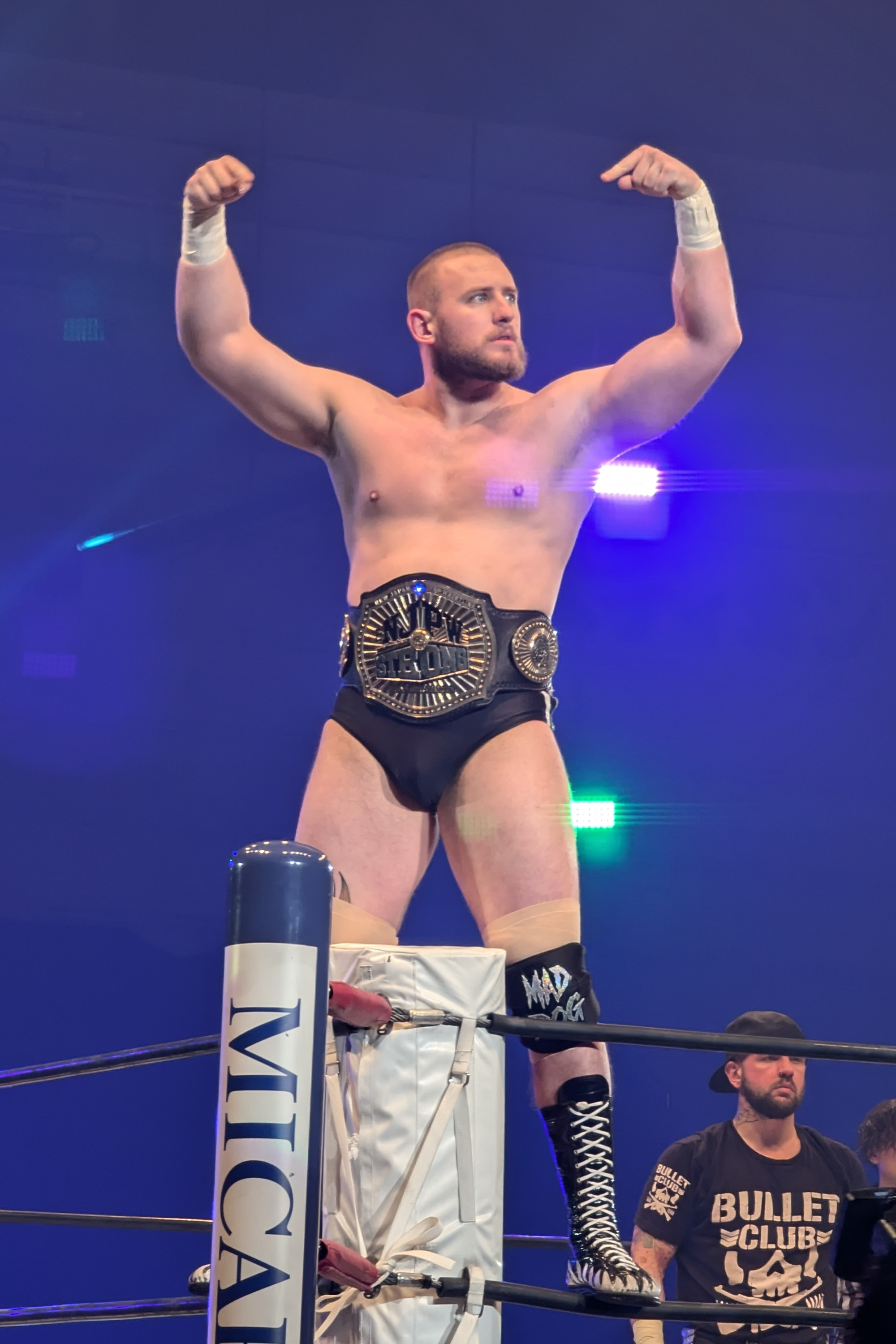
Kidd is a one-time Strong Openweight Champion

- All Elite Wrestling
  - AEW World Trios Championship (1 time) – with David Finlay and Clark Connors
- Empire Wrestling
  - Empire Tag Team Championship (1 time, inaugural) – with Saxon Huxley
- House Of Pain Wrestling
  - HOP Heavyweight Championship (1 time)
  - HOP Tag Team Championship (2 times) – with Moustachio (1) and Matt Hopkins (1)
- Kamikaze Pro
  - Relentless Division Championship (1 time)
- New Japan Pro-Wrestling
  - IWGP Global Heavyweight Championship (2 times, current)
  - Strong Openweight Championship (1 time)
  - Strong Openweight Tag Team Championship (1 time) – with Alex Coughlin
- Underground Wrestling Revolution
  - UWR Empire Championship (1 time)
- WhatCulture Pro Wrestling
  - WCPW Internet Championship (1 time)
- Pro Wrestling Illustrated
  - Ranked No. 35 of the top 500 singles wrestlers in the PWI 500 in 2025
- Wrestling Observer Newsletter
  - Pro Wrestling Match of the Year (2025) vs. Kenny Omega at Wrestle Dynasty
