= Yota Tsuji =

Japanese professional wrestler (born 1993)

- Tsuji as the IWGP Global Heavyweight Champion in January 2025

Personal information
- Born: Yota Tsuji; September 8, 1993 (age 33) Yokohama, Japan
- Education: Nippon Sport Science University

Professional wrestling career
- Ring name(s): Yota Tsuji; Yota; Mascara Kantansu Tomato; Philip Marlowe Jr.
- Billed height: 1.82 m (5 ft 11 1/2 in)
- Billed weight: 227 lb (103 kg)
- Billed from: Yokohama, Japan
- Trained by: Animal Hamaguchi; Hiroshi Tanahashi; NJPW Dojo; Tetsuya Naito; Ultimo Guerrero
- Debut: April 10, 2018

Yota Tsuji (辻 陽太, Tsuji Yōta; born September 8, 1993) is a Japanese professional wrestler. He is signed to New Japan Pro-Wrestling (NJPW), where he is a member of the Unbound Co. stable and is the current IWGP Heavyweight Champion in his second reign.

Tsuji made his debut for NJPW in April 2018 as a "Young Lion", working as one for the next three years until going on an overseas excursion. He initially wrestled for Revolution Pro Wrestling (RevPro) in the United Kingdom before moving to Consejo Mundial de Lucha Libre (CMLL) in Mexico, where he worked under the mononym Yota. Tsuji returned to NJPW in May 2023 and has since won the 2024 New Japan Cup, became a one-time NEVER Openweight 6-Man Tag Team Champion with Bushi and Hiromu Takahashi, a two-time IWGP Heavyweight Champion, and two-time IWGP Global Heavyweight Champion. He has also wrestled for All Elite Wrestling (AEW) in the United States.

== Professional wrestling career ==
=== New Japan Pro-Wrestling (2017–present) ===
==== Young lion and foreign excursion (2017–2023) ====
In April 2017, Tsuji was signed to New Japan Pro-Wrestling (NJPW) under their "young lion" system, having passed an entrance test four months prior. A year later, on April 10, 2018, Tsuji made his professional wrestling debut at Lion's Gate Project 11, losing to Tomoyuki Oka. On Night 1 of Wrestling Dontaku 2018 on May 3, Tsuji and Shota Umino were defeated by Bullet Club (Chase Owens and Yujiro Takahashi). Tsuji's first victory came on September 5, as he teamed with Ren Narita to defeat Umino and Yuya Uemura. On April 13, 2019, he scored his first singles victory against Uemura. From September 4 to 20, Tsuji took part in the Young Lion Cup, where he scored only four points after two wins and five losses, finishing in seventh place overall.

On January 4, 2020, Tsuji wrestled on the pre-show of Wrestle Kingdom 14 in Tokyo Dome, where he, Uemura, Togi Makabe and Tomoaki Honma lost to Alex Coughlin, Clark Connors, Karl Fredericks and Toa Henare. Shortly after, he participated in the Fantastica Mania 2020 tour, a series of shows in Japan co-promoted by NJPW and Mexican promotion Consejo Mundial de Lucha Libre (CMLL). Tsuji participated in the New Japan Cup in June 2020 and March 2021, but lost his first round matches to Makabe and Yuji Nagata, respectively. In late July 2021, it was announced that Tsuji would go on an excursion overseas, wrestling his "farewell match" in a loss to Tetsuya Naito on August 1.

==== Los Ingobernables de Japon (2023–2025) ====
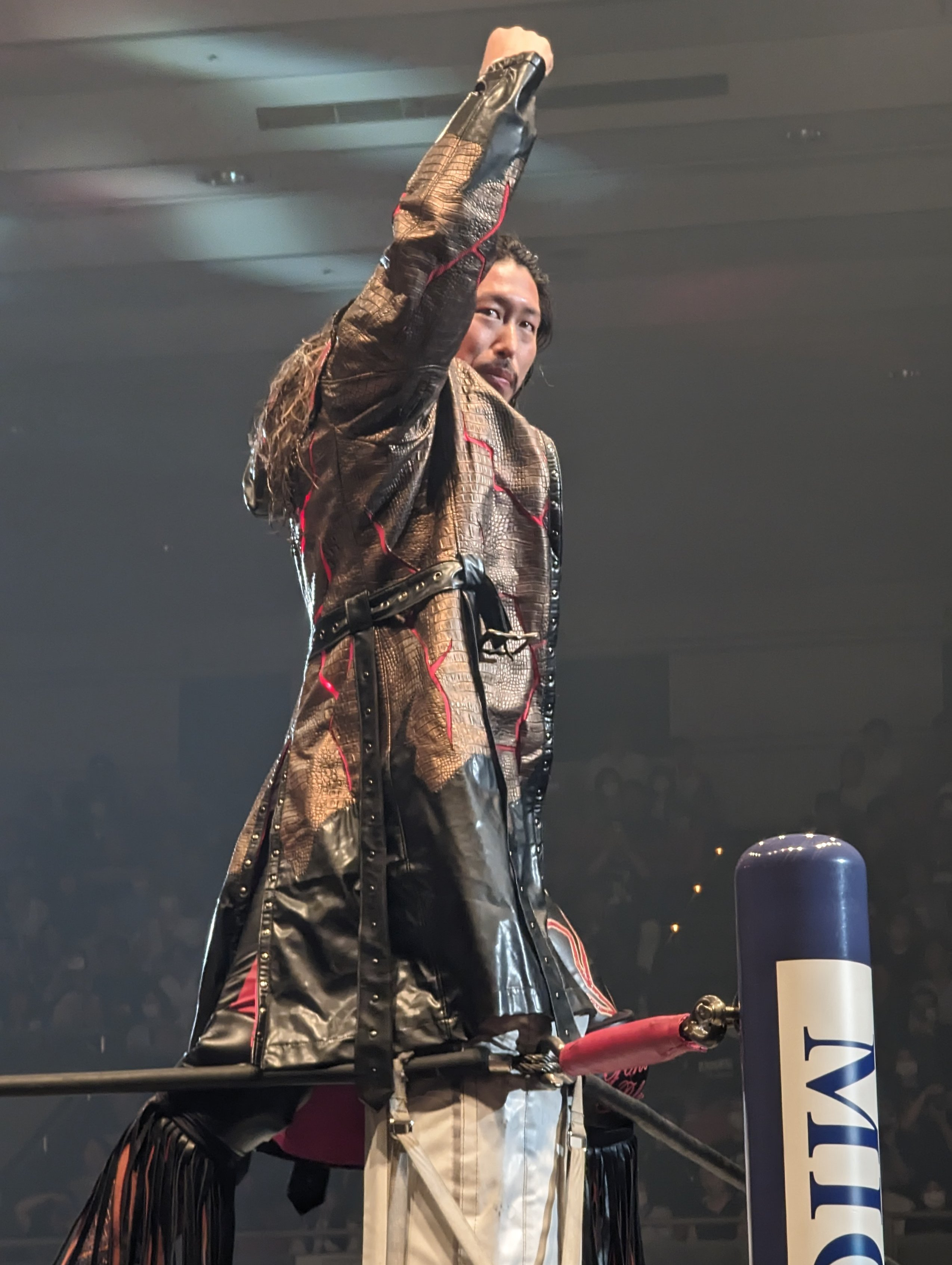
Tsuji in November 2023

On May 3, 2023, at Wrestling Dontaku 2023, Tsuji returned from his excursion, attacking IWGP World Heavyweight Champion Sanada and Just 5 Guys. Afterwards, he performed the signature gesture by Los Ingobernables de Japón (L.I.J.). During a press conference on June 3, Tsuji officially joined the stable. The next night, at Dominion 6.4 in Osaka-jo Hall, Tsuji unsuccessfully challenged Sanada for the IWGP World Heavyweight Championship. Following the event, Tsuji made his debut in the annual G1 Climax tournament, competing in the A Block. He finished the tournament with seven points after three wins, three losses and one draw, failing to advance to the quarter-finals. At Destruction in Kobe on September 24, he failed to win the IWGP United Kingdom Heavyweight Championship from Will Ospreay. On November 19, Tsuji revealed CMLL's Zandokan Jr. as his partner in the World Tag League. The duo finished the tournament with six points after three wins and three losses, failing to advance to the semi-finals. Tsuji subsequently renewed a feud with former Young Lion dojo stablemate and Just 5 Guys member Uemura, who pinned Tsuji in both a six-man tag team and singles match. At Wrestle Kingdom 18 on January 4, 2024, Tsuji lost to Uemura. On February 5, he challenged Uemura to a hair vs. hair match at The New Beginning in Sapporo, which Uemura accepted. At the event on February 24, Tsuji defeated Uemura, who was forced to have his head shaved in the process.

The following month, Tsuji entered the New Japan Cup, defeating Jeff Cobb in the first round, El Phantasmo in the second round, Narita in the quarter-finals and Evil in the semi-finals. On March 20, Tsuji defeated Hirooki Goto in the finals to win the New Japan Cup, his first major accolade in NJPW, earning him an IWGP World Heavyweight Championship match against L.I.J. leader and stablemate Tetsuya Naito at Sakura Genesis on April 6, which he lost. At Dominion 6.9 in Osaka-jo Hall on June 9, Tsuji won his first championship in NJPW, as he, Bushi and Hiromu Takahashi defeated Hiroshi Tanahashi, Oleg Boltin and Toru Yano for the NEVER Openweight 6-Man Tag Team Championship, but lost it in a rematch seven days later. That same month, he was announced as a B Block participant in the G1 Climax. Tsuji finished with ten points, allowing him to qualify for the playoff stage, where he defeated Konosuke Takeshita in the quarter-finals. After defeating David Finlay in the semi-finals, Tsuji lost to Zack Sabre Jr. in the finals on August 18. On September 8, he fought Cobb for the NJPW World Television Championship, but the match ended in a time limit draw. At King of Pro-Wrestling on October 14, he and Cobb were involved in a three-way match for the title, which was won by Narita.

At Wrestle Kingdom 19 on January 4, 2025, Tsuji defeated Finlay to win the IWGP Global Heavyweight Championship, his first singles title. The next night, he successfully defended the title against Jack Perry at Wrestle Dynasty. At The New Beginning in Osaka on February 11, Tsuji's title defense against Gabe Kidd ended in a double knockout. On March 8, he lost to Evil in the first round of the New Japan Cup after interference from Dick Togo. At Sakura Genesis on April 5, Tsuji successfully defended his title against Evil, enlisting the help of his twin brother, Shota, to fend off Evil's House of Torture stablemates. After the disbandment of L.I.J., Tsuji and the remaining members formed a new stable called "Unaffiliated". At Dominion 6.15 in Osaka-jo Hall on June 15, Tsuji lost his title to Kidd, ending his reign at 162 days. During the G1 Climax in August, as part of the A Block, Tsuji scored ten points to advance to the playoffs, where he defeated Shota Umino in the quarter-finals, before losing to Evil in the semi-finals. At King of Pro-Wrestling on October 13, Tsuji regained the title from Kidd; after the match, Unaffiliated formed an alliance with Kidd's stable, Bullet Club. On November 2, he successfully defended the title against Tanahashi. The following month, Tsuji and Kidd advanced to the semi-finals of that year's World Tag League, where they defeated Knockout Brothers (OSKAR and Yuto-Ice). On December 14, they lost to TMDK (Ryohei Oiwa and Zack Sabre Jr.) in the finals.

==== Unbound Co. (2026–present) ====
On January 4, 2026, at Wrestle Kingdom 20, Tsuji defeated Takeshita in a Winner Takes All match, retaining the IWGP Global Heavyweight Championship and capturing the IWGP World Heavyweight Championship. After the match, he was attacked by Jake Lee. The next day, at New Year Dash!!, Tsuji announced the dissolution of Bullet Club and Unaffiliated, replacing both groups with Unbound Co., a complete merger of the two factions. During the event, Tsuji also unveiled the V4 design of the IWGP Heavyweight Championship. With the approval of NJPW president Tanahashi, the championship was officially revived; its lineage was merged with those of the IWGP World Heavyweight Championship and the IWGP Intercontinental Championship, recognizing Tsuji as the 87th IWGP Heavyweight Champion and the final IWGP Intercontinental Champion. Tsuji successfully defended the title against Lee at The New Beginning in Osaka on February 11, as well as the IWGP Global Heavyweight Championship against Andrade El Ídolo at The New Beginning USA on February 27. However, he lost the IWGP Heavyweight Championship to 2026 New Japan Cup winner Callum Newman on April 4 at Sakura Genesis, and the IWGP Global Heavyweight Championship to Andrade El Ídolo in a rematch on Night 1 of Wrestling Dontaku on May 3. After pinning Newman in a tag team match, Tsuji earned a rematch and defeated him to regain the IWGP Heavyweight Championship on June 14 at Dominion 6.14 in Osaka-jo Hall. From July 11 till August 16, Tsuji participated in G1 Climax (A block) and finished with 12 points (6–3) to qualify for the semis; where he lost to Yuya Uemura. On September 27 at Destruction in Kobe, Tsuji successfully defended his title against Hirooki Goto who had defeated him in the G1 block stage. On October 12 at King of Pro-Wrestling. Tsuji successfully defended his title against 2026 G1 Climax winner Ryohei Oiwa. After the match, Tsuji was challenged by Boltin Oleg before both men were attacked by Kenny Omega.

=== Revolution Pro Wrestling (2021–2024) ===
As part of his foreign excursion, Tsuji joined Revolution Pro Wrestling (RevPro), wrestling his first match overseas in a losing effort against Kyle Fletcher on September 4, 2021. He and Shota Umino formed a tag team called The Legion, competing in Block B of the Great British Tag League tournament in May 2022, which they finished with two points after a singular victory over Lykos Gym (Kid Lykos and Kid Lykos II). Tsuji defeated Umino at Summer Sizzler on July 3, but lost to him in a strap match on Night 1 of RevPro's ten year anniversary show on August 20. Tsuji's last appearance for RevPro saw him participate in the Revolution Rumble entry tournament on March 19, 2023, where he defeated David Francisco in the semi-finals, before losing to Joshua James in the finals. On October 19, 2024, Tsuji returned to RevPro for one night at Global Wars UK, defeating Máscara Dorada.

=== Consejo Mundial de Lucha Libre (2022–2024) ===
Tsuji debuted for CMLL on November 11, 2022, under the mononymous name of Yota, where he, El Mesías and Vincent defeated Blue Panther, Soberano Jr. and Valiente. Later that month, he participated in a torneo cibernetico as part of the Leyenda de Azul ("The Blue Legend") tournament, but was eliminated by Ángel de Oro. On May 14, 2023, Yota unsuccessfully challenged Gran Guerrero for the CMLL World Heavyweight Championship. On July 24, 2024, Yota was announced as a participant in that year's International Grand Prix tournament on August 23, where he was disqualified and eliminated for attacking the referee. Four days later, he again failed to win the title from Guerrero, being disqualified when the referee caught him cheating.

On November 13, 2026, Tsuji returned to CMLL, attacking Místico ahead of the CMLL and NJPW co-promoted Lucha Kingdom event.

=== All Elite Wrestling (2024) ===
On June 30, 2024, Tsuji made his debut for All Elite Wrestling (AEW) at Forbidden Door Zero Hour, where he and Los Ingobernables de Japón stablemates Hiromu Takahashi and Titán lost to Místico and The Lucha Brothers (Penta El Zero Miedo and Rey Fénix).

== Personal life ==
Before wrestling, Tsuji had played baseball, American football and done taekwondo. He is a graduate of Nippon Sport Science University. Tsuji has a twin brother named Shota, who works as a stuntman.

== Championships and accomplishments ==
Tsuji is a two-time IWGP Global Heavyweight Champion

- ESPN
  - Ranked No. 23 of the 30 best Pro Wrestlers Under 30 in 2023
- New Japan Pro-Wrestling
  - IWGP Heavyweight Championship (Note: When Tsuji won the title, it was known as the IWGP World Heavyweight Championship but is reverted to IWGP Heavyweight Championship.) (2 times, current)
  - IWGP Intercontinental Championship (1 time, final)
  - IWGP Global Heavyweight Championship (2 times)
  - NEVER Openweight 6-Man Tag Team Championship (1 time) – with Bushi and Hiromu Takahashi
  - New Japan Cup (2024)
- Pro Wrestling Illustrated
  - Ranked No. 7 of the top 500 singles wrestlers in the PWI 500 in 2026
- Tokyo Sports
  - Best Bout Award (2024) Tsuji vs. Hirooki Goto on March 20

== Luchas de Apuestas record ==
Winner (wager)	Loser (wager)	Location	Event	Date	Notes
Yota Tsuji (hair)	Yuya Uemura (hair)	Sapporo, Japan	The New Beginning in Sapporo: Night 2	February 24, 2024	
