= Dominion 6.14 in Osaka-jo Hall =

2026 New Japan Pro-Wrestling event

- Promotion: New Japan Pro-Wrestling
- Date: June 14, 2026
- City: Osaka, Japan
- Venue: Osaka-jō Hall
- Attendance: 6,890

Event chronology
| ← Previous; Best of the Super Jr. 33 | Next → Fantastica Mania Mexico |

Dominion chronology
| ← Previous; 6.15 | Next → — |

Dominion 6.14 in Osaka-jo Hall was a professional wrestling event promoted by New Japan Pro-Wrestling (NJPW). The event took place on June 14, 2026, in Osaka, Japan at the Osaka-jō Hall. It was the 18th event under the Dominion name and the twelfth in a row to take place at the Osaka-jō Hall.

== Production ==
=== Storylines ===
Dominion 6.14 in Osaka-jo Hall featured professional wrestling matches that involved different wrestlers from pre-existing scripted feuds and storylines. Wrestlers portrayed villains, heroes, or less distinguishable characters in the scripted events that built tension and culminated in a wrestling match or series of matches.

== Results ==
| No. | Results | Stipulations | Times |
|---|---|---|---|
| 1 | Konosuke Takeshita (c) defeated Sanada by pinfall | Singles match for the NJPW World Television Championship | 8:26 |
| 2 | Jake Lee defeated El Phantasmo (with Jado) by referee stoppage | No Disqualification match | 9:40 |
| 3 | Yuya Uemura and Taichi defeated TMDK (Zack Sabre Jr. and Ryohei Oiwa) by pinfall | Tag team match | 13:15 |
| 4 | El Desperado defeated Místico by submisson | Singles match | 9:35 |
| 5 | Aaron Wolf defeated Ren Narita (c) (with Dick Togo, Yujiro Takahashi, and Yoshinobu Kanemaru) by pinfall | Singles match for the NEVER Openweight Championship | 9:25 |
| 6 | United Empire (Great-O-Khan and Henare) defeated Knock Out Brothers (Yuto-Ice and Oskar) (c) by pinfall | Tag team match for the IWGP Tag Team Championship; The winning team also earned spots in G1 Climax 36. | 21:32 |
| 7 | Shota Umino defeated Andrade El Ídolo (c) and Drilla Moloney by pinfall | Three-way match for the IWGP Global Heavyweight Championship | 16:25 |
| 8 | Yoh defeated Douki (c) by pinfall | Singles match for the IWGP Junior Heavyweight Championship | 17:54 |
| 9 | Yota Tsuji (with Shingo Takagi) defeated Callum Newman (c) (with Francesco Akira and Jake Lee) by pinfall | Singles match for the IWGP Heavyweight Championship | 24:33 |
(c) / – the champion(s) heading into the match
