= List of Bullet Club members =

The following is a list of members of Bullet Club, a professional wrestling stable that performed primarily in New Japan Pro-Wrestling (NJPW), All Elite Wrestling (AEW), Ring of Honor (ROH), and Consejo Mundial de Lucha Libre (CMLL) from 2013 to 2026.

== Members ==
=== Former ===
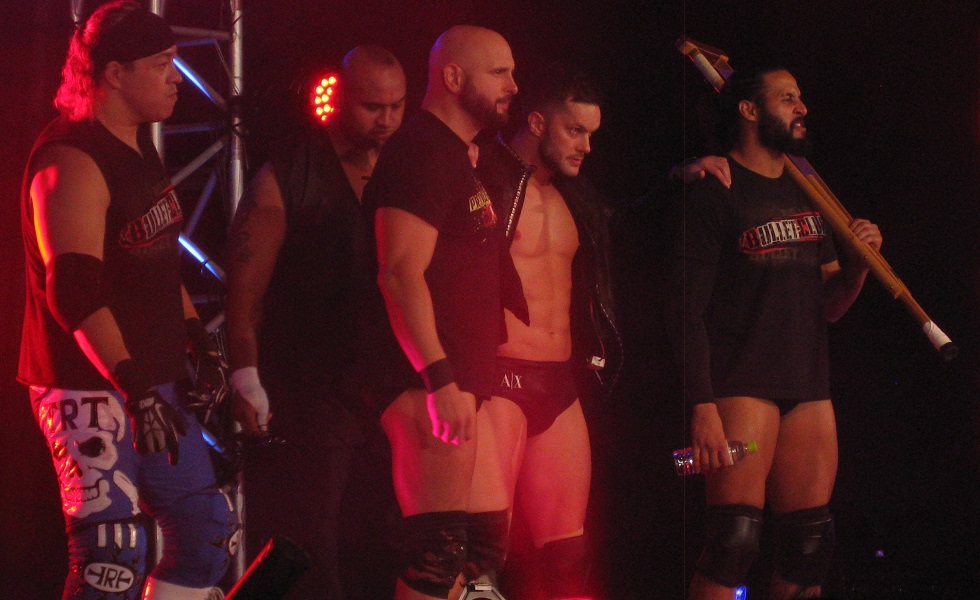
Bullet Club in September 2013: (left to right) Rey Bucanero, Bad Luck Fale, Karl Anderson, Prince Devitt, and Tama Tonga.

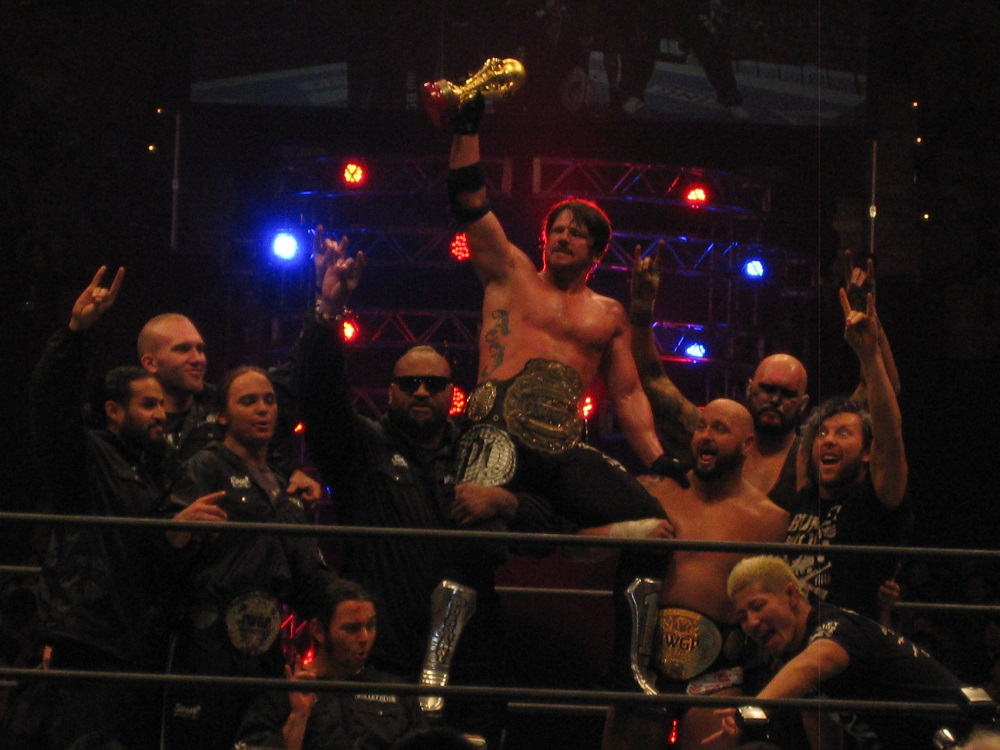
The 2015 incarnation of Bullet Club, featuring A.J. Styles being hoisted as the IWGP Heavyweight Champion as well as Nick Jackson wearing the IWGP Junior Heavyweight Tag Team Championship belt and Karl Anderson wearing the IWGP Tag Team Championship belt.

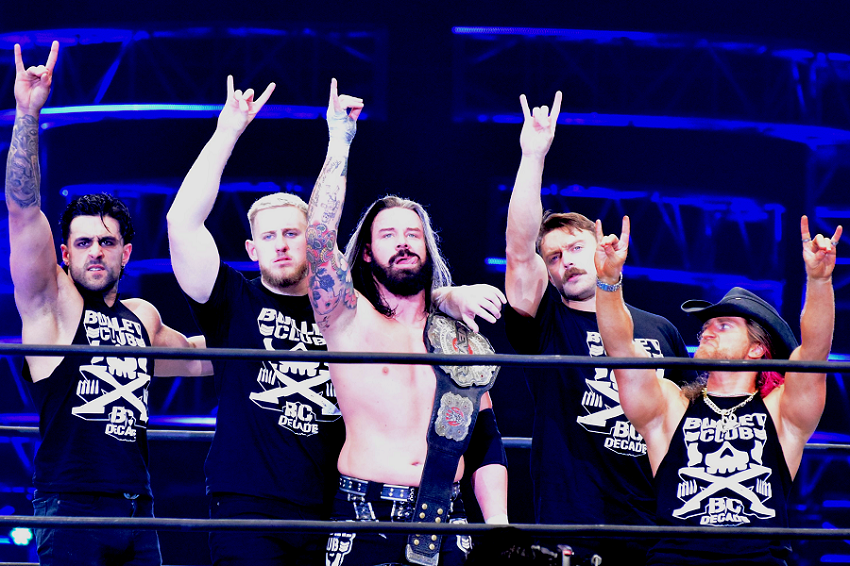
Bullet Club War Dogs contingent in 2023 from left to right: Drilla Moloney, Gabe Kidd, David Finlay, Alex Coughlin and Clark Connors.

*	Founding member
1st–5th	Leader(s)
M	Manager
V	Valet

Member		Joined	Left	Notes
Ace Austin		June 3, 2022	January 5, 2026	
Adam Cole		May 8, 2016	May 12, 2017	
"Hangman" Adam Page		May 9, 2016	October 30, 2018	
AJ Styles	2nd	April 6, 2014	January 5, 2016	
Alex Coughlin		June 4, 2023	March 24, 2024	
Amber O'Neal/Gallows	V	December 5, 2014	November 26, 2016	(Note: This member never officially left the stable. The date represents their final appearance as a member.)
Austin Gunn		June 24, 2023	January 5, 2026	
Bad Luck Fale	*	May 3, 2013	June 15, 2025	
Bone Soldier		September 25, 2016	January 5, 2017	
Brandi Rhodes	V	December 10, 2016	October 30, 2018	
Caveman Ugg		February 4, 2023	June 15, 2025	
Chase Owens		October 23, 2015; January 5, 2019	October 30, 2018; June 15, 2025	
Chris Bey		July 19, 2021	January 3, 2025	(Note: NJPW and TNA ended their partnership in December 2024.)
Clark Connors		April 15, 2023	January 5, 2026	
Cody Rhodes		December 10, 2016	October 30, 2018	
Cody Hall		January 5, 2015	April 10, 2016	
Colten Gunn		June 24, 2023	January 5, 2026	
David Finlay	5th	March 6, 2023	January 5, 2026	
Dick Togo		July 12, 2020	May 3, 2025	
Doc Gallows		November 23, 2013; May 1, 2021	February 20, 2016; October 10, 2022	
Drilla Moloney		June 4, 2023	January 5, 2026	
El Phantasmo		May 4, 2019	April 8, 2023	
El Terrible		July 5, 2013	December 13, 2013	
Evil		July 11, 2020	May 3, 2025	
Frankie Kazarian		February 11, 2017	March 10, 2017	
Gabe Kidd		June 4, 2023	January 5, 2026	
Gedo	M	October 8, 2018	January 5, 2026	
Gino Gambino		November 11, 2017	June 30, 2019	
Hikuleo		September 7, 2017	September 25, 2022	(Note: Formerly billed as Leo Tonga and currently billed as Hikuleo by NJPW)
Jack Bonza		October 21, 2022	June 15, 2025	
Jack Perry		March 6, 2024	January 5, 2025	
Jado		October 8, 2018	March 13, 2022	
Jake Lee		July 13, 2024	January 4, 2026	
Jay White	4th	October 8, 2018; April 5, 2023	January 5, 2026	
Jeff Jarrett	M	August 10, 2014	January 4, 2015	
Juice Robinson		May 1, 2022	January 5, 2026	
Karl Anderson	*	May 3, 2013; May 1, 2021	February 20, 2016; January 4, 2023	
Kenny Omega	3rd	November 8, 2014	October 30, 2018	
Kenta		August 12, 2019	January 6, 2025	
King Haku	M	January 4, 2016; July 2, 2017; July 7, 2018; July 28, 2021		
La Comandante	M	October 11, 2013	December 13, 2013	
Lyrebird Luchi		January 27, 2023	June 10, 2023	
Mao	V	May 3, 2014	January 4, 2016	(Note: Although not full-fledged members of Bullet Club, Mao and Pieter have frequently accompanied Yujiro Takahashi to the ring, oftentimes dressed in Bullet Club gear.)
Marty Scurll		May 12, 2017	October 30, 2018	
Matt Jackson		October 25, 2013; June 26, 2022	October 30, 2018; June 26, 2022	
Mephisto		January 18, 2015	January 19, 2015	
Naomichi Marufuji		January 21, 2023		
Nick Jackson		October 25, 2013; June 26, 2022	October 30, 2018; June 26, 2022	
Oskar		August 17, 2025	January 5, 2026	
Prince Devitt	*1st	May 3, 2013	April 6, 2014	
Pieter	V	September 22, 2016	May 3, 2025	(Note: "Tokyo Latina" Pieter occasionally appeared for NJPW as the valet for Yujiro. She was aligned with the House of Torture contingent due her association with Yujiro from 2021 to 2025)
Ren Narita		December 6, 2023	May 3, 2025	
Rey Bucanero		September 5, 2013	October 13, 2013	
Robbie Eagles		October 8, 2018	June 30, 2019	
Robbie X		October 20, 2024	January 5, 2026	
Sanada		November 4, 2024	May 3, 2025	
Scott D'Amore	M	August 10, 2014	January 4, 2015	
Scott Norton		April 16, 2022		
Sho		September 4, 2021	May 3, 2025	
Stephen Amell		November 17, 2017; September 1, 2018		
Stevie Filip		April 16, 2023	June 15, 2025	
Taiji Ishimori		May 4, 2018	January 5, 2026	
Tama Tonga	*	May 3, 2013	February 19, 2022	
Tanga Loa		March 12, 2016	February 19, 2022	(Note: The name has been written as both Tanga Roa and Tanga Loa. NJPW originally used the spelling Roa, but have since switched to Loa. CMLL used the spelling Roa, while ROH has used both Loa and Roa.)
Templario		January 14, 2018	January 11, 2019	
Tome Filip		April 16, 2023	June 15, 2025	
Yujiro Takahashi		May 3, 2014; January 5, 2019	October 30, 2018; May 3, 2025	
Yoshinobu Kanemaru		September 24, 2023	May 3, 2025	
Yuto-Ice		August 17, 2025	January 5, 2026	

== Sub-groups ==
=== Former ===
Affiliate	Members	Tenure	Type	Promotion(s)
The Ace and Bey Connection; A.B.C.	Ace Austin; Chris Bey	2022–2024	Tag team	NJPW; Strong; TNA; Independent circuit
Bang Bang Gang; Bullet Club Gold	Jay White; Juice Robinson; Austin Gunn; Colten Gunn; Ace Austin	2023–2026	Stable	AEW; ROH
Bullet Club Elite "The Elite"	Cody Rhodes; Kenny Omega; Matt Jackson; Nick Jackson; Hangman Page; Marty Scurll; Yujiro Takahashi; Chase Owens; Stephen Amell	2018–2019	Stable	NJPW; ROH
Bullet Club Latinoamerica; Bullet Club Latin-American	El Terrible; La Comandante; Rey Bucanero; Tama Tonga; Yujiro Takahashi; Mephisto	2013; 2015	Stable (2013); Tag Team (2015)	NJPW; CMLL
Bullet Club OG "Firing Squad"	Tama Tonga; Tanga Loa; Taiji Ishimori; Jado; Gedo; Gino Gambino; Bad Luck Fale; Jay White; Robbie Eagles; Hikuleo; King Haku	2018–2019	Stable	NJPW
Bullet Club USA	AJ Styles; Matt Jackson; Nick Jackson; Doc Gallows; Karl Anderson; Adam Cole; Hangman Page; Cody; Marty Scurll; Frankie Kazarian	2014–2018	Stable	ROH
Bullet Club War Dogs	David Finlay; Drilla Moloney; Alex Coughlin; Gabe Kidd; Gedo; Clark Connors; Jake Lee; Sanada; Taiji Ishimori; Robbie X Chase Owens; Oskar; Yuto-Ice	2023–2026	Stable	NJPW; AEW; RevPro
Guerrillas of Destiny; G.O.D. The Tongans	Tama Tonga; Tanga Loa	2016–2022	Tag team	NJPW; ROH; Strong; Impact
Guns and Gallows; The Good Brothers	Karl Anderson; Doc Gallows	2013–2016; 2021–2022	Tag team	NJPW; Strong; Impact; AEW
House of Torture	Evil; Dick Togo; Yujiro Takahashi; Sho; Yoshinobu Kanemaru; Ren Narita; Jack Perry; Sanada	2021–2025	Stable	NJPW
The Hung Bucks	Hangman Page; Matt Jackson; Nick Jackson	2017–2018	Trio	ROH
Jado and Gedo	Jado; Gedo	2018–2022	Tag team	NJPW
The Jay and Bey Connection	Jay White; Chris Bey	2021–2022	Tag team	Impact
Luxury Trio	Cody Rhodes; Kenny Omega; Marty Scurll	2017–2018	Trio	NJPW; ROH
Knock Out Brothers	Oskar; Yuto-Ice	2025–2026	Tag team	NJPW
Superkliq	Adam Cole; Matt Jackson; Nick Jackson	2016–2017	Trio	NJPW; ROH; Independent circuit
Super Villains	Marty Scurll; Matt Jackson; Nick Jackson	2017–2018	Trio	NJPW; ROH; Independent circuit
The Elite	Kenny Omega; Matt Jackson; Nick Jackson	2016–2018; 2021	Trio	NJPW; ROH; AEW; Independent circuit
The Gunns	Austin Gunn; Colten Gunn	2023–2026	Tag team	AEW; ROH
The Young Bucks	Matt Jackson; Nick Jackson	2013–2018; 2022	Tag team	AEW; NJPW; ROH; Independent circuit
Team All In	Cody Rhodes; Matt Jackson; Nick Jackson	2018–2019	Trio	ROH
