= Great-O-Khan =

Japanese professional wrestler (born 1991)

Great O-Khan
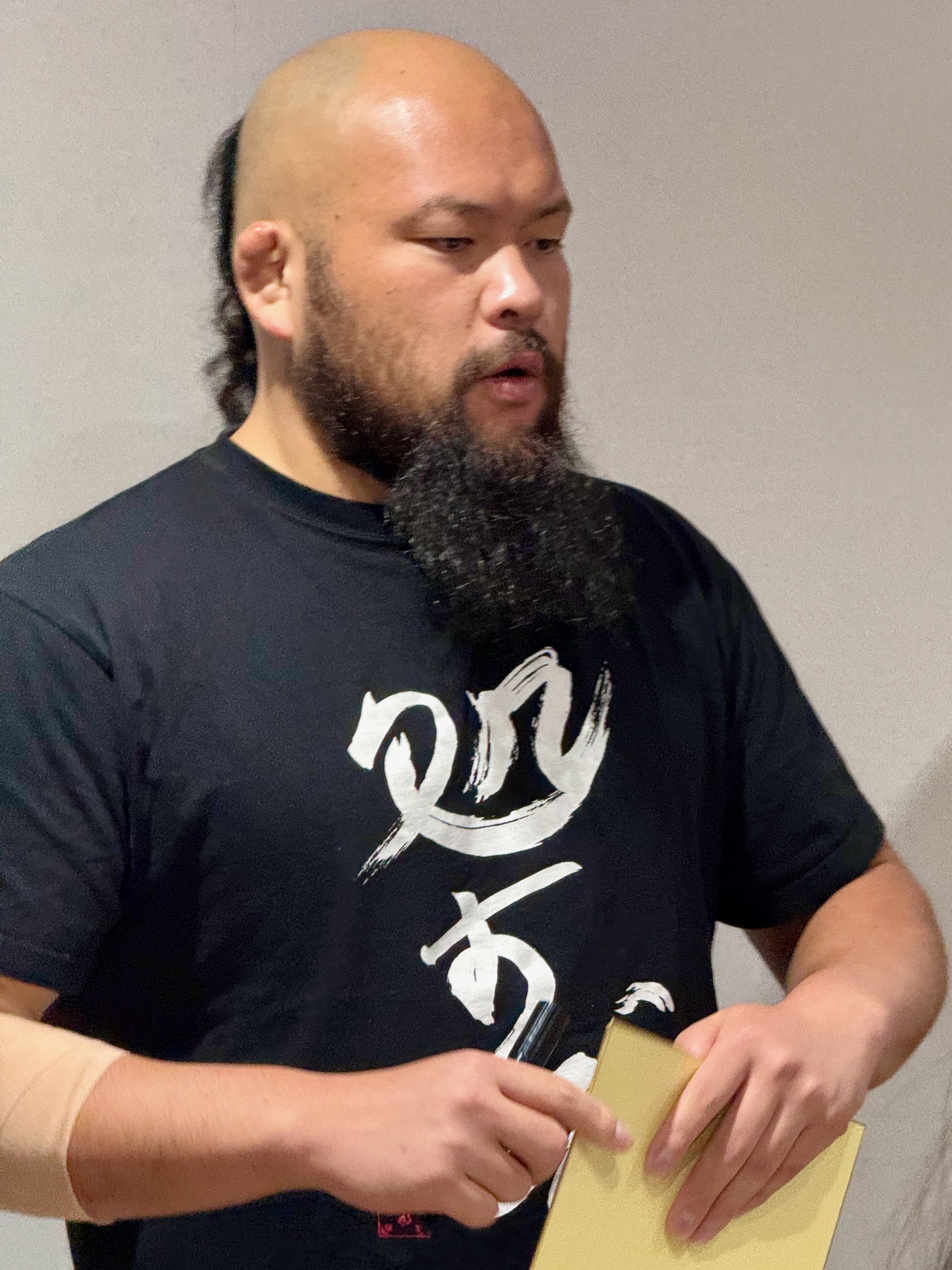
- O-Khan in 2025

Personal information
- Born: Tomoyuki Oka; 12 June 1991 (age 35) Maebashi, Gunma, Japan

Professional wrestling career
- Ring name(s): Great-O-Khan; Great-O-Kharn; Tomoyuki Oka
- Billed height: 188 cm (6 ft 2 in)
- Billed weight: 120 kg (265 lb)
- Trained by: NJPW Dojo; Hiroyoshi Tenzan; Yuji Nagata
- Debut: February 25, 2016

Tomoyuki Oka (岡 倫之, Oka Tomoyuki; born June 12, 1991), better known by his ring name Great-O-Khan (グレート-O-カーン, Gurēto-Ō-Kān), is a Japanese professional wrestler. He is signed to New Japan Pro-Wrestling (NJPW), where he is a member of the United Empire stable.

In NJPW, O-Khan is a former one-time NEVER Openweight 6-Man Tag Team Champion with Henare and Will Ospreay, a former NJPW World Television Champion, the final official KOPW Champion and a five-time IWGP Tag Team Champion, (twice with Jeff Cobb, twice with Henare, and once with Callum Newman).

== Early life ==
Oka excelled in amateur wrestling while in school, winning the All Japan Wrestling Championship in the 120 kg Freestyle class in 2012. Oka met Takaaki Kidani, president of Bushiroad in 2013, and was signed to New Japan Pro-Wrestling (NJPW) shortly after, but didn't begin training until 2015 as he was still in university at the time. In the past, Oka has also competed in judo, karate, sambo, kickboxing, pankration, jiu-jitsu and mixed-martial arts.

== Professional wrestling career ==
=== New Japan Pro-Wrestling (2015–present) ===
==== Young Lion and excursion (2015–2020) ====
Oka began training with New Japan Pro-Wrestling (NJPW) in 2015, and made his in-ring debut on February 25, 2016, wrestling fellow rookie Katsuya Kitamura to a draw in a dark match at Lion's Gate Project 1. Oka and Kitamura wrestled to another draw in a dark match on September 1 at Lion's Gate Project 3. Oka made his televised debut on January 3, 2017, losing to his trainer Yuji Nagata. Oka once again lost to Nagata on January 27, January 31, and February 2. On February 9, Oka, Yoshitatsu and Henare were defeated by Nagata, Hirai Kawato and Jyushin Thunder Liger. Oka's first victory came on February 21, when he defeated Henare via referee stoppage after Henare suffered an ankle injury during their match. On April 13 at Lion's Gate Project 4, he teamed with his trainer Yuji Nagata to defeat Katsuya Kitamura and Manabu Nakanishi. On July 22, he and Nagata defeated Kitamura and Hiroshi Tanahashi. Oka then formed a tag team named "Monster Rage" with Kitamura. From October 12 to December 21, Oka took part in the 2017 Young Lion Cup, where he finished third with a record of three wins and two losses. Oka and Kitamura made their debuts in All Japan Pro Wrestling (AJPW) on July 5, 2017, losing to Wild Burning (Jun Akiyama and Takao Omori).

On June 30, 2018, Oka debuted a new look and ring name, Great-O-Kharn, inspired by the jiangshi vampire from Chinese folklore. He defeated Shota Umino with a new finisher, a Mongolian chop delivered from the second turnbuckle.

==== United Empire (2020–present) ====
On October 16, 2020, O-Kharn, now going by the slightly modified ring name Great-O-Khan, returned to NJPW during G1 Climax 30, helping Will Ospreay defeat Kazuchika Okada. He joined Ospreay and his girlfriend, Bea Priestley, in a new faction, The Empire. In November 2020, O-Khan and new member of The Empire, Jeff Cobb would enter World Tag League where they finished with a record of 5 wins and 4 losses. The faction would rename itself United Empire in January 2021. O-Khan would wrestle and lose to Hiroshi Tanahashi at Wrestle Kingdom 15. After Tanahashi defeated Shingo Takagi in the main event of The New Beginning in Nagoya to win the NEVER Openweight Championship, O-Khan would attack Tanahashi and then issue a challenge for the following months Castle Attack event. At Castle Attack, Tanahashi would once again defeat O-Khan. In March 2021, O-Khan entered the New Japan Cup for the first time, where he defeated Tetsuya Naito in the first round, but lost to Toru Yano in the second round. Following this O-Khan feuded with Tetsuya Naito culminating in a singles match at the 26th April Road To Wrestling Dontaku event. O-Khan was defeated by Naito in this match. In September O-Khan was announced as a participant in G1 Climax 31, his first appearance in the tournament. He finished the tournament with a record of four wins and five defeats, for a total of 8 points. At Power Struggle, O-Khan unsuccessfully challenged Toru Yano in an amateur rules match for the 2021 KOPW provisional championship. O-Khan's 2021 concluded with World Tag League, teaming with Aaron Henare. The team finished with a score of fourteen points, seven wins and four losses.

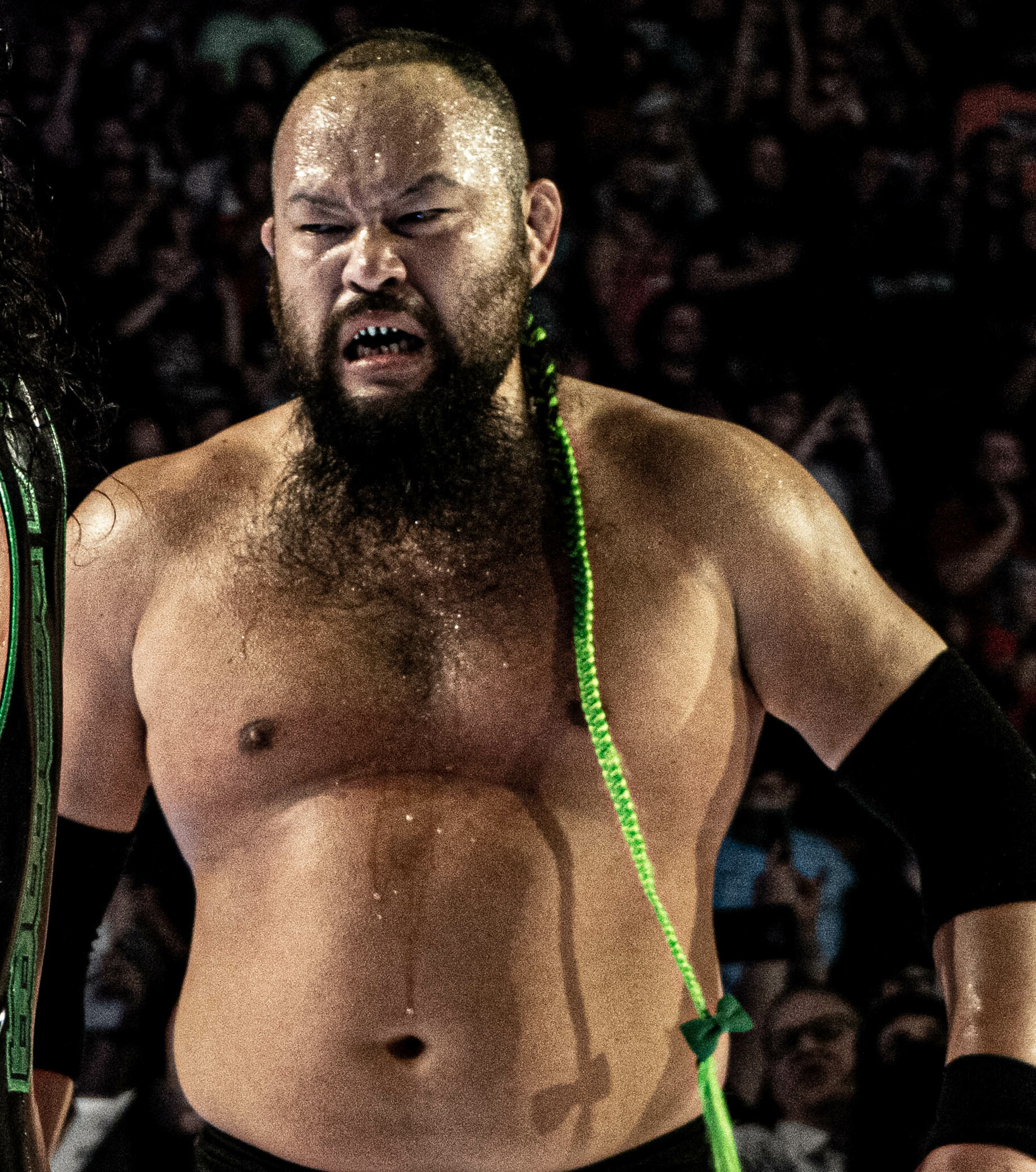
O-Khan in June 2022

O-Khan began 2022 with a loss to Sanada at Wrestle Kingdom 16 in a special singles match. An entrant in the 2022 New Japan Cup, O-Khan was defeated by Zack Sabre Jr. in the third round. On April 9, O-Khan and Cobb became the IWGP Tag-team Champions for the first time in both men's careers, during the Hyper Battle series. The two lost the titles at Wrestling Dontaku, ending their reign at 22 days. They regained the titles on June 12, at Dominion 6.12 in Osaka-jo Hall. After losing the titles at Forbidden Door, O-Khan was announced to be a part of the G1 Climax 32 in July, where he would compete in the B Block. O-Khan finished the tournament with 4 points, failing to advance to the semi-finals.

In September, O-Khan made his debut for Pro Wrestling Noah, teaming with The Great Muta and Nosawa Rongai to defeat Kongo (Tadasuke, Manabu Soya and Kenoh), at the finals of the N-1 Victory. In October, O-Khan competed in a tournament to crown, the inaugural NJPW World Television Champion. O-Khan lost in the first round to Toru Yano, following being misted by The Great Muta. The following month, O-Khan once again teamed with Aaron Henare in the World Tag League, finishing with 10 points, failing to advance to the tournament finals. On December 17, O-Khan returned to RevPro winning the Undisputed British Heavyweight Championship, defeating Zak Zodiac, who was replacing champion Ricky Knight Jr.

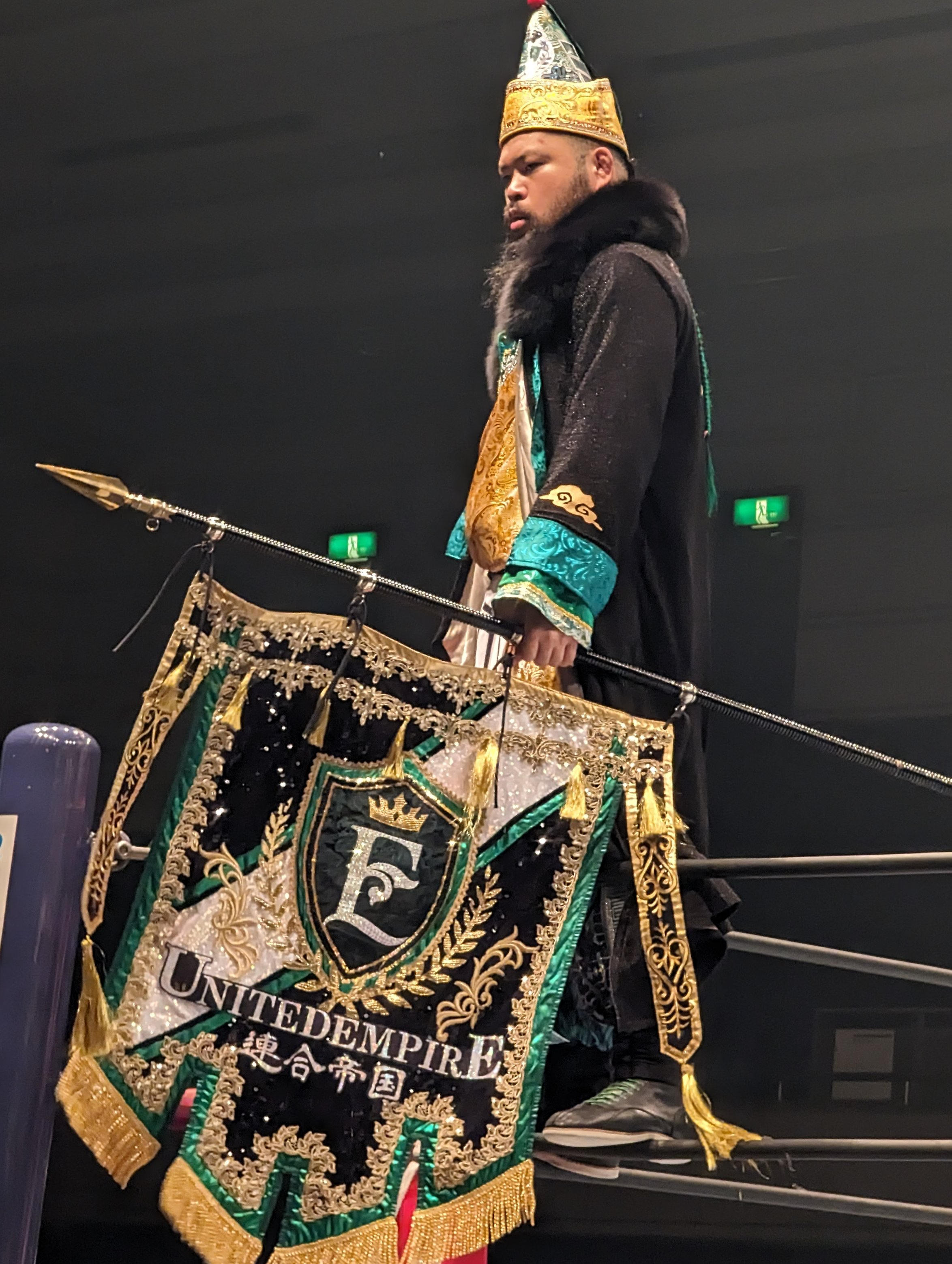
O-Khan in November 2023

On January 4, 2023 at Wrestle Kingdom 17, O-Khan entered the New Japan Rambo, lasting till the final 4 and advancing to the four-way match the following day, for the Provisional KOPW Championship. The following day at New Year Dash, O-Khan failed to win the Provisional KOPW Championship, after the four-way match was won by Shingo Takagi, with the match also including Toru Yano and Sho. Later that month, O-Khan faced Takagi for the provisional title, at The New Beginning in Nagoya, losing in a Mixed Martial Arts rules match. In March, O-Khan entered the New Japan Cup tournament, receiving a bye to the second round, although he lost to David Finlay. Later that month, O-Khan successfully defended the Undisputed British Heavyweight Championship against Ricky Knight Jr. In June at Dominion 6.4 in Osaka-jo Hall, O-Khan teamed with Aaron Henare in a three-way tag-team match for both the IWGP Tag Team Championships and the Strong Openweight Tag Team Championships, which were both vacant. The match was won by Bishamon (Hirooki Goto and Yoshi-Hashi). In July, O-Khan lost the Undisputed British Heavyweight Championship to Michael Oku, ending his reign at 204 days. The following week, O-Khan entered the G1 Climax tournament, participating in the B Block. O-Khan finished the tournament with 6 points, failing to advance to the tournament's quarterfinals. O-Khan attacked Takagi, during a post-match interview, before forcing him to lick his boots, as he promised an "execution" at the hands of the United Empire. On September 24 at Destruction, O-Khan was defeated by Takagi.

On January 5, 2024 at New Year Dash, O-Khan was defeated by Taiji Ishimori in the match to crown the first Provisional 2024 KOPW Champion, with Ishimori avoiding O-Khan to win the match. Afterwards, in a post-match interview, O-Khan challenged Ishimori to a rematch. On January 11, both wrestlers proposed the rules for the match, with O-Khan suggesting a Bullrope Deathmatch, after Ishimori drew the ire of O-Khan. On January 22 at The New Beginning in Nagoya, O-Khan defeated Ishimori to win the provisional 2024 KOPW Championship in a 10-minute Ishimori Ring Fit match. After his win, O-Khan stated that he would be taking the title to be defended around Japan and not simply at the big tour ending dates.

In March, O-Khan took part in the 2024 New Japan Cup, before being eliminated from the tournament by Tanga Loa on March 7 in the first round in an upset win. Afterwards, Loa began constantly challenging O-Khan; despite O-Khan stating that Loa was not up to the task, this led on March 18, O-Khan finally accepted Loa's challenge leading to the match becoming official three days later. On March 25, ahead of their match, a fan vote was held by each men proposing each stipulation, Jado, on the behalf of Loa, proposed a “King of Kaiju Match", as much like a Texas Deathmatch, with the bout seeing competitors looking to score a pinfall, after which a ten count was applied, with the last man standing being the winner. O-Khan then sneered that ‘that’s something an ape would think up’. Afterwards, O-Khan proposed a "Rural Revitalization Match in Hamamatsu", with O-Khan stating that the match would be a ‘two out of three falls’, but with very different interpretations of falls. The first fall would be held under a ten minute time limit most cover rules, with every pinfall attempt counting as a point in the scenario. The second round would be an eating contest, with the local specialty of eel being the focus for five minutes, while the third would a strap match with two wrestlers connected via a strap with the winner having to touch all four corners consecutively to win the match. O-Khan then reiterated the only way to watch the match was to be live in person; although suggested that fans would be able to see the match later at NJPW World. Two days later, it was announced that O-Khan and Loa would face each other in a Rural Revitalization Match in Hamamatsu, following the result of a fan poll. On March 31, O-Khan defeated Loa to make his first title defense, with O-Khan scoring the second and third falls; despite Loa winning the first fall.

On April 6, at Sakura Genesis, O-Khan along with his stablemates Jeff Cobb and Callum Newman lost in a six-man tag team match against Just 5 Guys (Sanada, Yuya Uemura and Douki), after Uemura directly pinned O-Khan. Uemura who had been gaining momentum since the New Japan Cup, challenged O-Khan, with O-Khan accepting the challenge. On April 18, ahead of their match, a fan vote was held by each men proposing each stipulation, Uemura proposed a Catch Rules Match, alluding to O-Khan’s proficient grappling background while O-Khan once again proposed a "Rural Revitalization Match in Hamamatsu" in a pledge to ‘unite the fiefdoms’ across Japan under his suzerainty. Four days later, it was announced that O-Khan and Uemura would face each other in a Rural Revitalization Match in Hamamatsu, following the result of a fan poll. On April 27, Uemura defeated O-Khan to become the Provisional KOPW Champion after Uemura defeated O-Khan in the first and third falls. He regain it on June 9 at Dominion 6.9 in Osaka-jo Hall in a Storm Catch Rules match. From July 20 and August 12, O-Khan took part in the 2024 G1 Climax, where he lost his three opening block matches, before bouncing back winning his next five matches including an upset win over IWGP World Heavyweight Champion Tetsuya Naito on August 12, the final day of the tournament, to advance to the A block play-off match to decide the semifinalists of the tournament. At the play-off match, on August 14, O-Khan was defeated by Shingo Takagi. On September 29 at Destruction in Kobe, O-Khan unsuccessfully challenged Tetsuya Naito for the IWGP World Heavyweight Championship.

On April 5, 2025 at Sakura Genesis, O-Khan successfully defeated El Phantasmo, for the NJPW World Television Championship On April 26, at Wrestling Redzone in Hiroshima, O-Khan and Callum Newman defeated Bishamon (Hirooki Goto and Yoshi-Hashi) to win the vacant IWGP Tag Team Championship. On April 29 at Wrestling Hizen no Kuni, O-Khan lost the NJPW World Television Championship back to El Phantasmo.

On Night 2 of Wrestling Dontaku on May 4, 2026, O-Khan, Henare, and the recently returned Will Ospreay defeated Bishamon-tin (Boltin Oleg, Hirooki Goto, and Yoshi-Hashi) to win the NEVER Openweight 6-Man Tag Team Championship. On June 14 at Dominion 6.14 in Osaka-jo Hall, O-Khan and Henare defeated Knock Out Brothers (Oskar and Yuto-Ice) to win the IWGP Tag Team Championship. O-Khan and Henare lost the titles back to Knock Out Brothers on October 6 during the Road to King of Pro-Wrestling tour, ending their reign at 114 days. On October 12 at King of Pro-Wrestling, O-Khan, Henare, and Ospreay lost the titles to Unbound Co. (Yuto-Ice, Oskar, and Jeff Cobb), ending their reign at 161 days.

=== Revolution Pro Wrestling (2018–2019) ===
Great O-Kharn started his excursion in the United Kingdom with New Japan affiliate Revolution Pro Wrestling and has started with 3 impressive wins and has since reinvented his finisher into a Crossbow submission. At Revolution Pro Wrestling's Summer Sizzler O-Kharn defeated American Superstar Shane Strickland and continued his winning streak into the Rev Pro tapings. On October 13, 2019, The Great O-Kharn teamed with Rampage Brown to win the RPW Tag Titles. A month later, on November 24, O-Kharn and Brown unified the RPW Tag Titles with the SWE Tag Titles when they defeated The Moonlight Express

=== All Elite Wrestling (2022) ===
On the May 25, 2022 episode of Dynamite, O-Khan and Cobb interrupted the ROH World Tag Team Championship match between FTR and Roppongi Vice, attacking both teams and raising the championships, indicating their intentions of challenging for the championships. On the June 15 episode of Dynamite, and after O-Khan and Cobb and the rest of United Empire attacked both tag teams, Ospreay was announced to face Orange Cassidy, whilst O-Khan and Cobb were placed into a triple-threat tag-team Winner Takes All match for their newly won IWGP Tag Team Championships and FTR's ROH World Tag Team Championships, along with Roppongi Vice at Forbidden Door. At the event, Cobb and O-Khan both failed to capture the ROH World Tag Team Titles, and lost their IWGP Tag Team Titles to FTR.

== Personal life ==
Oka is an avid anime fan, citing Tantei Opera Milky Holmes as his favorite series.

On April 4, 2022, Oka was given a letter of appreciation by Kawasaki City police after saving a teenage girl who had been grabbed by a drunk man at JR Musashi Kosugi Station on March 29, 2022. He displayed the letter during his entrance at his next match, to raise awareness for crime prevention.

== Championships and accomplishments ==
- Pro Wrestling Illustrated
  - Ranked No. 137 of the top 500 singles wrestlers in the PWI 500 in 2025
- New Japan Pro-Wrestling
  - NJPW World Television Championship (1 time)
  - IWGP Tag Team Championship (5 times) – with Jeff Cobb (2), Henare (2), and Callum Newman (1)
  - NEVER Openweight 6-Man Tag Team Championship (1 time) – with Will Ospreay and Henare
  - KOPW Provisional Championship (2 times)
  - KOPW (2024, final)
- Revolution Pro Wrestling
  - British Heavyweight Championship (1 time)
  - RPW Undisputed British Tag Team Championship (1 time) – with Rampage Brown
- Southside Wrestling Entertainment
  - SWE Tag Team Championship (1 time) – with Rampage Brown
- Tokyo Sports
  - Technique Award (2021)
  - Fighting Spirit Award (2022)
  - Best Tag Team Award (2022) – with Jeff Cobb
