= Taichi =

- Gender: Male

Origin
- Origin: Japanese
- Meaning: Different meanings depending on the kanji used

Taichi is a Japanese given name and surname.

== Given name ==
Taichi (written: 汰一, 太一, 太地, 大地, 多一, 泰稚 or 泰地) is a masculine Japanese given name.

=== People with the given name ===
Notable people with the name include:

- Taichi Fukui (福井 太智; born 2004), Japanese professional footballer
- Taichi Fukuyama (福山 汰一; born 1993), Japanese volleyball player
- Taichi Hara (原 大智; born 1999), Japanese professional footballer
- Taichi Hasegawa (長谷川 太一; born 1981), Japanese footballer
- Taichi Ichikawa (市川太一), Japanese voice actor
- Taichi Ishikari (石狩 太一; born 1980), Japanese professional wrestler
- Taichi Ishiyama (石山 泰稚; born 1988), Japanese baseball player
- Taichi Kato (加藤 大智; born 1997), Japanese former professional footballer
- Taichi Kikuchi (菊地 泰智; born 1999), Japanese footballer
- Taichi Kokubun (国分 太一; born 1974), Japanese musician and actor
- Taichi Mukai (向井 太一; born 1992), Japanese singer, songwriter and model
- Taichi Nakamura (footballer) (中村 太一; born 1993), Japanese footballer
- Taichi Nakamura (shogi) (中村 太地; born 1988), Japanese shogi player
- Taichi Okazaki (岡崎 太一; born 1983), Japanese baseball player
- Taichi Saito (齋藤 太一; born 1993), Japanese badminton player
- Taichi Sakaiya (堺屋 太一; 1935–2019), Japanese economist and author
- Taichi Saotome (早乙女 太一; born 1991), Japanese actor
- Taichi Sato (佐藤 太一; born 1977), Japanese footballer
- Taichi Takahashi (高橋 汰地; born 1996), Japanese rugby union player
- Taichi Takami (髙見 泰地; born 1993), Japanese shogi player
- Taichi Takeda (武田 太一; born 1997), Japanese former footballer
- Taichi Teshima (手嶋 多一; born 1968), Japanese golfer
- Taichi Vakasama (born 1999) Fijian swimmer
- Taichi Watarai (渡会 太一; born 2004), Japanese racing driver
- Taichi Yamada (山田 太一; born 1934), Japanese writer and screenwriter
- Taichi Yamada (rower) (山田 太一; 1917–?), Japanese rower
- Taichi Yamano (山野 太一; born 1999), Japanese professional baseball player
- Taichi Yoshizawa (吉澤 太一; born 1991), Japanese rugby sevens player

=== Fictional characters with the given name ===
Fictional characters with the given name include:

- Taichi Mashima, a character in the manga series Chihayafuru
- Taichi Yagami (Tai Kamiya in English dub), a character in the anime series Digimon Adventure
- Taichi Yaegashi, a character in the light novel series Kokoro Connect
- Taichi Kawanishi (川西 太一), a character from the manga and anime Haikyu!! with the position of middle blocker from Shiratorizawa Academy
- Taichi Suzuki, the identity of Kazuma Kiryu in Yakuza 5

== Surname ==
Taichi (written: 太地) is also a Japanese surname. Notable people with the surname include:

- Kiwako Taichi (太地 喜和子; 1943–1992), Japanese actress
