= The New Beginning in Osaka (2026) =

2026 professional wrestling event

- Promotion: New Japan Pro-Wrestling
- Date: February 11, 2026
- City: Osaka, Japan
- Venue: Osaka Prefectural Gymnasium
- Attendance: 5,507

Event chronology
← Previous; New Year Dash!!	Next → The New Beginning USA

The New Beginning chronology
← Previous; Osaka (2025)	Next → USA (2026)

The New Beginning in Osaka was a professional wrestling event promoted by New Japan Pro-Wrestling (NJPW). The event took place on February 11, 2026, in Osaka at the Osaka Prefectural Gymnasium. It was the forty-second event under the New Beginning name and the tenth to take place in Osaka.

Nine matches were contested at the event, including one on the pre-show. In the main event, Yota Tsuji defeated Jake Lee to retain the IWGP Heavyweight Championship. In other prominent matches, Knock Out Brothers (Oskar and Yuto-Ice) defeated RoughStorm (Shota Umino and Yuya Uemura) to retain the IWGP Tag Team Championship, Ren Narita defeated Aaron Wolf to win the NEVER Openweight Championship, and Callum Newman defeated David Finlay. The event also featured the final NJPW match of Hiromu Takahashi.

== Production ==
=== Storylines ===
The New Beginning in Osaka featured professional wrestling matches that involves different wrestlers from pre-existing scripted feuds and storylines. Wrestlers portrayed villains, heroes, or less distinguishable characters in scripted events that built tension and culminated in a wrestling match or series of matches.

== Results ==
No.	Results	Stipulations	Times
1^{P}	The Most Violent Players (Togi Makabe and Toru Yano) defeated Katsuya Murashima and Shoma Kato by pinfall	Tag team match	8:15
2	Unbound Co. (Hiromu Takahashi and Taiji Ishimori) defeated United Empire (Francesco Akira and Jakob Austin Young) by submission	Tag team match This was Takahashi's final NJPW match.	9:40
3	War Dragons (Shingo Takagi and Drilla Moloney) defeated United Empire (Great-O-Khan and Henare) by pinfall	Tag team match	9:29
4	Boltin Oleg and Bishamon (Hirooki Goto and Yoshi-Hashi) (c) defeated TMDK (Zack Sabre Jr., Ryohei Oiwa and Hartley Jackson) (with Kosei Fujita) by pinfall	Six-man tag team match for the NEVER Openweight 6-Man Tag Team Championship	12:21
5	Andrade El Ídolo defeated Gabe Kidd by pinfall	Singles match to determine the #1 contender to the IWGP Global Heavyweight Championship	14:19
6	Callum Newman (with Zane Jay) defeated David Finlay (with Gedo) by pinfall	Singles match	13:54
7	Ren Narita (with Dick Togo) defeated Aaron Wolf (c) by pinfall	Singles match for the NEVER Openweight Championship	2:09
8	Knock Out Brothers (Oskar and Yuto-Ice) (c) defeated Shota Umino and Yuya Uemura by pinfall	Tag team match for the IWGP Tag Team Championship	19:49
9	Yota Tsuji (c) defeated Jake Lee by pinfall	Singles match for the IWGP Heavyweight Championship	23:36
(c) / – the champion(s) heading into the match; P / – the match was broadcast on the pre-show
