= Wrestle Kingdom 17 =

2023 New Japan Pro-Wrestling event

- Promotional poster for night 1 featuring various NJPW wrestlers and Antonio Inoki
- Promotion(s): New Japan Pro-Wrestling; Pro Wrestling Noah (January 21)
- Date: January 4, 2023; January 21, 2023
- City: Tokyo, Japan; Yokohama, Japan
- Venue: Tokyo Dome; Yokohama Arena
- Attendance: Night 1: 26,085; Night 2: 5,533; Combined: 31,618
- Tagline(s): Antonio Inoki Memorial Spectacular; Fighting Spirit Forever

Event chronology
← Previous; Historic X-Over; Road to Tokyo Dome	Next → New Year Dash!!

Wrestle Kingdom chronology
← Previous; 16	Next → 18

Wrestle Kingdom 17 was a two-day professional wrestling pay-per-view (PPV) event co-produced by the New Japan Pro-Wrestling (NJPW) and Pro Wrestling Noah (Noah) promotions. The first day of the event took place on January 4, 2023, at the Tokyo Dome in Tokyo, Japan and the second day of the event took place on January 21, 2023, at the Yokohama Arena in Yokohama, Japan. It is the 32nd January 4 Tokyo Dome Show and the 17th promoted under the Wrestle Kingdom name. The event was held in honor of the NJPW founder Antonio Inoki, who died on October 1, 2022.

In the main event of night 1, Kazuchika Okada defeated Jay White to win the IWGP World Heavyweight Championship. In other prominent matches, Kenny Omega defeated Will Ospreay to win the IWGP United States Heavyweight Championship, Keiji Muto teamed with Hiroshi Tanahashi and Shota Umino to defeat Los Ingobernables de Japon (Tetsuya Naito, Sanada and Bushi) in Muto's final NJPW match, and Kairi defeated Tam Nakano to retain the IWGP Women's Championship – following the match, Mercedes Moné, formerly known as Sasha Banks in WWE, made her NJPW debut. The event's first night also notably featured appearances from wrestlers signed to All Elite Wrestling, WWE, NJPW's sister promotion World Wonder Ring Stardom, and Noah. In the main event of the second night, which was co-promoted by Noah, Tetsuya Naito defeated Kenoh – after the match, Naito was announced as Keiji Muto's last ever opponent at Keiji Muto Grand Final Pro-Wrestling "Last-Love". In other prominent matches, Shingo Takagi defeated Katsuhiko Nakajima, Kazuchika Okada and Togi Makabe wrestled Kaito Kiyomiya and Yoshiki Inamura to a no contest, and Hiroshi Tanahashi teamed with Takashi Sugiura, Toru Yano and Satoshi Kojima to defeat Bullet Club (El Phantasmo, Kenta and Gedo) and Naomichi Marufuji.

Night 1 of the event set an all-time viewership record for the NJPW World streaming service.

== Production ==
=== Background ===
The January 4 Tokyo Dome Show is NJPW's biggest annual event and has been called "the largest professional wrestling show in the world outside of the United States" and the "Japanese equivalent to the Super Bowl". The show has been promoted under the Wrestle Kingdom name since 2007.

Wrestle Kingdom 17 was officially announced on August 18, 2022, during the finals of the G1 Climax. On November 24, NJPW announced a second night for the event, taking place on January 21 at the Yokohama Arena.

The January 4 event featured wrestlers from All Elite Wrestling (AEW), World Wonder Ring Stardom, and WWE. The January 21 event will see involvement from Pro Wrestling Noah.

The event honors the company's founder Antonio Inoki, who died on October 1, 2022.

=== Storylines ===
==== Night 1 ====
Wrestle Kingdom 17 featured professional wrestling matches that involved different wrestlers from pre-existing scripted feuds and storylines. Wrestlers portrayed villains, heroes, or less distinguishable characters in the scripted events that built tension and culminated in a wrestling match or series of matches.

At Dominion 6.12 in Osaka-jo Hall, Bullet Club leader Jay White defeated Kazuchika Okada to win the IWGP World Heavyweight Championship. Okada would later win the G1 Climax for a fourth time (and becoming a back-to-back winner), earning himself another title shot and the main event of Wrestle Kingdom. White defended the title against former Bullet Club original Tama Tonga at Declaration of Power, setting up his and Okada's rematch for the main event of Wrestle Kingdom.

Also at Declaration of Power, New Japan Pro-Wrestling president & CEO Takami Ohbari and TV Asahi representative Hiroyoki Mihira announced the creation of the NJPW World Television Championship. The title's first champion was determined in a sixteen-man single-elimination tournament, which began on October 14, 2022, at night 1 of Battle Autumn, and will conclude at Wrestle Kingdom. Zack Sabre Jr. defeated Alex Zayne, David Finlay, and EVIL to reach the finals, and Ren Narita defeated Tomohiro Ishii, Toru Yano, and Sanada for his finals spot.

After Will Ospreay defended the IWGP United States Heavyweight Championship at Historic X-Over, his celebration was interrupted by a video from AEW's Kenny Omega. Omega blamed Ospreay for not being a suitable replacement for him in NJPW and, after receiving a call from management, decided to return to the company after four years and challenged Ospreay for the title at Wrestle Kingdom, which Ospreay accepted.

On November 20, at Historic X-Over, Kairi defeated Mayu Iwatani in the finals of a seven-woman single-elimination tournament to become the inaugural IWGP Women's Champion. After the match, Tam Nakano challenged Kairi for the title at Wrestle Kingdom.

After Taiji Ishimori lost a non-title match to Master Wato at Declaration of Power, he was confronted by Hiromu Takahashi and previous champion El Desperado, who both wanted a shot at the IWGP Junior Heavyweight Championship after accusing Ishimori of not being a fighting champion. Ishimori, who wanted to establish himself as the "big one" in the junior heavyweight division, decided to defend his title against both competitors and Wato at Wrestle Kingdom in a four-way match.

On December 22, 2022, NJPW revealed a championship belt to represent the KOPW Championship, replacing the trophy which had been destroyed and vandalized many times since its inception. The belt will be presented to the first provisional champion of 2023, to be determined in the New Japan Rumble, with the last four competitors competing in a four-way match at New Year Dash!! on the following night.

==== Night 2 ====
On night three of Wrestle Kingdom 16, Los Ingobernables de Japon defeated Kongo at the NJPW and Pro Wrestling Noah joint event on January 8, 2022 at Yokohama Arena. On night one of Wrestle Kingdom 17, Kongo confronted Los Ingobernables de Japon backstage after Los Ingobernables de Japon lost their match against Keiji Muto, Hiroshi Tanahashi and Shota Umino. It was announced that Los Ingobernables de Japon and Kongo would take apart in a best of five singles matches on night two with Bushi facing Tadasuke, Takahashi facing Hajime Ohara, Sanada facing Manabu Soya, Shingo Takagi facing Katsuhiko Nakajima and Tetsuya Naito will face Kenoh in the main event.

== Event ==
Other on-screen personnel
Role:	Name:
English Commentators	Kevin Kelly
English Commentators	Chris Charlton
English Commentators	Gino Gambino
English Commentators	Rocky Romero
Japanese Commentators	Shinpei Nogami
Japanese Commentators	Milano Collection A.T.
Japanese Commentators	Katsuhiko Kanazawa
Japanese Commentators	Kazuyoshi Sakai
Japanese Commentators	Togi Makabe (Guest)
Japanese Commentators	Masahiro Chono (Guest)
Ring announcers	Hidekazu Tanaka
Ring announcers	Kimihiko Ozaki
Ring announcers	Makoto Abe
Referees	Norio Honaga
Referees	Kenta Sato
Referees	Yuya Sakamoto
Referees	Marty Asami
Referees	Red Shoes Unno
Referees	Tiger Hattori

=== Night 1 ===
==== Pre-show ====
Three matches took place at the pre-show of Night 1. In the first, Ryohei Oiwa took on Oleg Boltin in a three minute exhibition match. Boltin performed a slam for a nearfall, after which, the time expired.

The second pre-show match was the New Japan Rambo to determine the number one contender for the Provisional KOPW 2023 Championship at New Year Dash!!. In the end, Sho (who entered at #1), Toru Yano (#16), Shingo Takagi (#19) and Great-O-Khan (#5) were the winners.

In the main event of the pre-show of Night 1, Yuji Nagata, Satoshi Kojima and Togi Makabe teamed up to take on Tatsumi Fujinami, Minoru Suzuki and Tiger Mask in the Antonio Inokie Memorial match. In the closing stages, Makabe blocked a reverse hurricarana from Tiger. Makabe then rolled Tiger for the pin.

==== Preliminary matches ====
The opening contest saw Catch 2/2 defend the IWGP Junior Heavyweight Tag Team Championship against LiYoh. In the end, LiYoh hit the 3K on TJP, but Francesco Akira broke it up. As Yoh was looking for the Direct Drive, TJP countered it into an inside cradle for the victory.

Next, Kairi defended the IWGP Women's Championship against Tam Nakano. In the closing stages, Kairi hit two spinning backfists and the Insane Elbow to pick up the victory. After the match, Mercedes Moné made her long awaited debut, announcing herself as the CEO of the women's division, and challenged Kairi to a match at Battle in the Valley, which Kairi accepted.

The next bout saw FTR face Bishamon for the IWGP World Tag Team Championship. In the end, Yoshi-Hashi blocked the Big Rig, and hit a superkick on Cash Wheeler. Bishamon then hit Shoto on Dax Harwood to become the new tag team champions.

The fourth match was to determine the inaugural NJPW World Television Champion, contested between Zack Sabre Jr. and Ren Narita. Sabre Jr. won after countering the Narita Special #3 and delivering the Cross Arm-Breaker. After the match, Sabre Jr. joined TMDK.

Next, WWE's Karl Anderson defended the NEVER Openweight Championship against Tama Tonga (with Jado). In the end, Tonga hit an enzuigiri, a DDT and a Gun Stun to become the new champion.

The next bout featured Keiji Muto, Hiroshi Tanahashi and Shota Umino teaming up in Muto'a final NJPW match against Los Ingobernables de Japon. Tanahashi delivered sling blades on Bushi and Sanada. Muto and Umino then hit simultaneous shining wizards on Bushi to pic kup the victory.

In the tenth match, Hiromu Takahashi, Taiji Ishimori, El Desperado and Master Wato squared off for the IWGP Junior Heavyweight Championship. In the end, Wato delivered Recientemente, but Takahashi broke up the pin. Takahashi then plabted Wato with the Time Bomb to become the new champion.

In the penultimate match, Kenny Omega and Will Ospreay squared off with the IWGP United States Championship on the line. Osprey hit the Oscutter, but Omega rolled out of the ring. Ospreay then bir the Styles Clash. Omega escaped the Stormbreaker and hit the V-Trigger. As Ospreay was looking for a Spanish Fly, Omega countered it into a DDT into an exposed turnbuckle, causing Ospreay's head to be busted open. Omega performed a straight jacket German suplex, the Kamigoye and the One Winged Angel to pick up the victory and the title.

==== Main event ====
In the main event, Jay White (with Gedo) defended the IWGP World Heavyweight Championship against Kazuchika Okada. White hit Okada with a Saito suplex. Okada hit a DDT on the ramp. Okada countered the Blade Runner into a German suplex. As Okada was looking for the Rainmaker, White countered it into the Blade Runner. White then hit a lariat and the Jay Maker. Okada started gaining momentum, hitting three uppercuts and an enzuigiri. Okada connected with the Blade Runner, The Cobra Flowsion and The Rainmaker for the victory. After the match, Shingo Takagi challenged Okada to a championship match at The New Beginning in Osaka.

=== Night 2 ===
==== Pre-show ====
There were two matches contested on the pre-show. In the opener, Kosei Fujita and Ryohei Oiwa teamed up to take on Daishi Ozawa and Yasutaka Yano. In the end, Oiwa and Fujita tossed Yano over the ropes, allowing Fujita to lock in a Boston Crab submission, forcing Ozawa to tap out. (NJPW 1 vs. Noah 0)

The main event of the pre-show saw Masa Kitamiya and Daiki Inaba take on Tomohiro Ishii and Oskar Leube. In the closing stages, Kitamiya overpowered Leube ando locked in the Prison Lock for the submission win. (NJPW 1 vs. NOAH 1)

==== Preliminary matches ====
The show opened with a ten-bell salute to Jay Briscoe, who was a tag team champion in NJPW and NOAH.

The opening contest was Hiroshi Tanahashi, Toru Yano, Satoshi Kojima and Takashi Suguira taking on Naomichi Marufuji, Kenta, El Phantasmo and Gedo. In the end, as Kenta and Gedo were trying to Two Sweet Marufuji, Yano snuck in and delivered a low blow on Gedo and rolled him up for the win.

Next, El Desperado faced Yo-Hey. In the end, as Desperado was looking for Pinche Loco, Yo-Hey countered it into a pin. Desperado then locked in the Numero Dias for the submission win. (NJPW 2 vs. NOAH 1)

Next, Alejandro, Junta Miyawaki and Amakusa took on Master Wato, Ryusuke Taguchi and Tiger Mask. In the end, Amakusa performed a suplex and hit the Freebird Splash for the win. (NJPW 2 vs. NOAH 2)

Next, Kazuchika Okada and Togi Makabe faced Kaito Kiyomiya and Yoshiki Inamura. The matches ended in a no-contest after both teams were brawling on the outside for a long time.

The next match featured Tadasuke taking on Bushi. Bushi used the mist on Tadasuke, but he replied with a crucifix pin for the win (NJPW 2 vs. NOAH 3; LIJ 0 vs. Kongo 1)

The eighth match saw Hiromu Takahashi face Hajime Ohara. In the end, Takahashi won after hitting the Victory Royal and the Time Bomb for the win. (NJPW 3 vs. NOAH 3; LIJ 1 vs. Kongo 1)

Next, Manabu Soya and Sanada faced off. Soya won after a Death Valley Bomb and the Bomber. (NJPW 3 vs. NOAH 4; LIJ 1 vs. Kongo 2)

In the penultimate match, Shingo Takagi and Katsuhiko Nakajima go one-on-one. In the closing stages, Takagi hit the Made in Japan, a pumping bomber and the Last of the Dragon for the win. (NJPW 4 vs. NOAH 4; LIJ 2 vs. Kongo 2)

==== Main event ====
The main event featured Tetsuya Naito and Kenoh square off in the final match of the NJPW vs. NOAH and Los Ingobernables de Japon vs. Kongo series. In the opening stages, Kenoh threw Naito into the barricade. Kenoh tried throwing Naito in the corner, but Naito countered it into a swinging neckbreaker. Kenoh then delivered a diving double-foot stomp. As Kenoh was looking for Ring of Fire, Naito countered it into a spinebuster. As Kenoh was looking for a suplex, Naito turned it into a Destino and delivered one for good measure again to win the match. After the match, Naito tried to help Kenoh, but Kenoh refused. As Naito was delivering a promo, Keiji Muto came out and challenged Naito be his final opponent of his career at Keiji Muto Grand Final Pro-Wrestling "Last-Love", which Naito gladly accepted. (NJPW 5 vs. NOAH 4; LIJ 3 vs. Kongo 2).

== Results ==
Night 1 (January 4)
No.	Results	Stipulations	Times
1^{P}	Ryohei Oiwa vs. Oleg Boltin ended in a time limit draw	Exhibition match	3:00
2^{P}	Great-O-Khan, Shingo Takagi, Sho and Toru Yano won (Note: Participants were: Sho, Hikuleo, Evil, Tomohiro Ishii, Great-O-Khan, Douki, Rocky Romero, Kenta, Yoshinobu Kanemaru, Aaron Henare, Ryusuke Taguchi, Jeff Cobb, Shane Haste, Mikey Nicholls, Yujiro Takahashi, Toru Yano, El Phantasmo, Taichi and Shingo Takagi)	New Japan Ranbo to determine who will challenge for the Provisional KOPW 2023 Championship at New Year Dash!!	30:37
3^{P}	Yuji Nagata, Satoshi Kojima and Togi Makabe defeated Tatsumi Fujinami, Minoru Suzuki and Tiger Mask by pinfall	Antonio Inoki Memorial six-man tag team match	9:10
4	Catch 2/2 (TJP and Francesco Akira) (c) (with Gideon Grey) defeated LiYoh (Lio Rush and Yoh) by pinfall	Tag team match for the IWGP Junior Heavyweight Tag Team Championship	10:29
5	Kairi (c) defeated Tam Nakano by pinfall	Singles match for the IWGP Women's Championship	5:56
6	Bishamon (Hirooki Goto and Yoshi-Hashi) defeated FTR (Dax Harwood and Cash Wheeler) (c) by pinfall	Tag team match for the IWGP Tag Team Championship	10:10
7	Zack Sabre Jr. defeated Ren Narita by submission	Tournament final for the inaugural NJPW World Television Championship	10:32
8	Tama Tonga (with Jado) defeated Karl Anderson (c) by pinfall	Singles match for the NEVER Openweight Championship	9:35
9	Keiji Muto, Hiroshi Tanahashi and Shota Umino defeated Los Ingobernables de Japon (Tetsuya Naito, Sanada and Bushi) by pinfall	Six-man tag team match This was Muto's last NJPW match.	9:20
10	Hiromu Takahashi defeated Taiji Ishimori (c), El Desperado, and Master Wato by pinfall	Four-way match for the IWGP Junior Heavyweight Championship	16:43
11	Kenny Omega (with Don Callis) defeated Will Ospreay (c) (with United Empire (Aaron Henare, Catch 2/2 (TJP and Francesco Akira), Great-O-Khan, and Jeff Cobb)) by pinfall	Singles match for the IWGP United States Heavyweight Championship	34:38
12	Kazuchika Okada defeated Jay White (c) (with Gedo) by pinfall	Singles match for the IWGP World Heavyweight Championship	33:03
(c) / – the champion(s) heading into the match; P / – the match was broadcast on the pre-show

Night 2 (January 21)
No.	Results	Stipulations	Times
1^{P}	Kosei Fujita and Ryohei Oiwa defeated Taishi Ozawa and Yasutaka Yano by submission	Tag team match	12:12
2^{P}	Masa Kitamiya and Daiki Inaba defeated Tomohiro Ishii and Oskar Leube by submission	Tag team match	10:28
3	Hiroshi Tanahashi, Takashi Sugiura, Toru Yano and Satoshi Kojima defeated Bullet Club (El Phantasmo, Kenta, Gedo and Naomichi Marufuji) by pinfall	Eight-man tag team match	12:20
4	El Desperado defeated Yo-Hey by submission	Singles match	10:57
5	Alejandro, Junta Miyawaki and Amakusa defeated Master Wato, Ryusuke Taguchi and Tiger Mask by pinfall	Six-man tag team match	9:37
6	Kazuchika Okada and Togi Makabe vs. Kaito Kiyomiya and Yoshiki Inamura ended in a no contest	Tag team match	6:35
7	Tadasuke defeated Bushi by pinfall	Singles match	11:09
8	Hiromu Takahashi defeated Hajime Ohara by pinfall	Singles match	13:05
9	Manabu Soya defeated Sanada by pinfall	Singles match	13:57
10	Shingo Takagi defeated Katsuhiko Nakajima by pinfall	Singles match	18:28
11	Tetsuya Naito defeated Kenoh by pinfall	Singles match	26:57
P / – the match was broadcast on the pre-show

=== NJPW World Television Championship Inaugural Tournament bracket ===
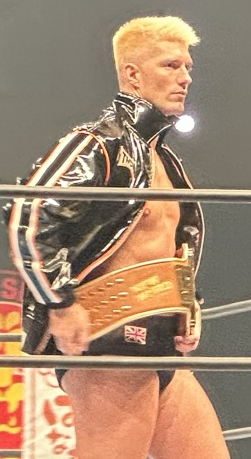
Zack Sabre Jr., who won a tournament and became the first champion. He also holds the record for longest reign and most successful defenses.

The first champion was determined in a sixteen-man single-elimination tournament, which began on October 14, 2022, at Battle Autumn (Night 1) and concluded on January 4, 2023, at Wrestle Kingdom 17. In the event of a time limit draw during the tournament, the winner (and thus, person advancing) was decided by a coin toss.

== See also ==
- 2023 in professional wrestling
- List of NJPW pay-per-view events
- Professional wrestling at the Tokyo Dome
