= List of NEVER Openweight 6-Man Tag Team Champions =

List of professional wrestling 6-man tag team championship

The NEVER Openweight 6-Man Tag Team Championship is a professional wrestling championship owned by the New Japan Pro-Wrestling (NJPW) promotion.

NEVER is an acronym of the terms "New Blood", "Evolution", "Valiantly", "Eternal", and "Radical" and was a NJPW-promoted series of events, which featured younger up-and-coming talent and outside wrestlers not signed to the promotion. The title was announced on December 21, 2015, with the first champions crowned on January 4, 2016. Through NJPW's relationship with Ring of Honor (ROH), the title has also been defended in the American promotion. The championship is contested for by teams of three wrestlers and is the first title of its kind in the history of NJPW. The title's openweight nature means that both heavyweight and junior heavyweight wrestlers are eligible to challenge for it.

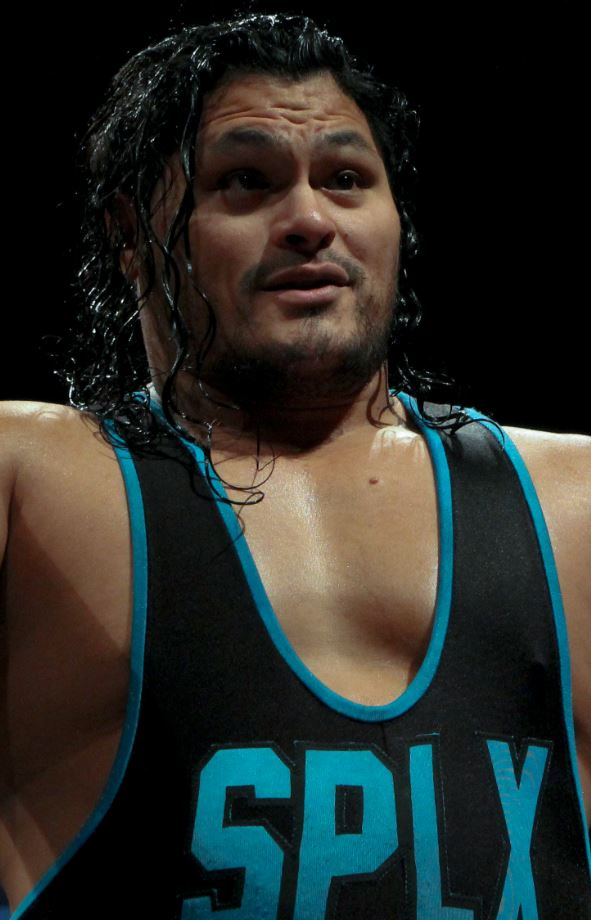
Current champions Unbound Co. (Yuto-Ice, Oskar, and Jeff Cobb)

Chaos (Jay Briscoe, Mark Briscoe and Toru Yano) were the first champions in the title's history. Los Ingobernables de Japón (Bushi, Evil and Sanada) and Chaos (Tomohiro Ishii, Toru Yano, and Beretta) both hold the record for shortest reign at 1 day each, while Chaos (Hirooki Goto, Tomohiro Ishii and Yoshi-Hashi) hold the record for longest reign at 454 days and record for most defenses at 9 defenses. Los Ingobernables de Japón also hold the record for most reigns as a team with three. Individually, Bushi and Evil hold the record for title defenses with 6 each. Bushi, Evil, Tonga, and Yano share the record for individual reigns at 4 each.

Unbound Co. (Yuto-Ice, Oskar, and Jeff Cobb) are the current champions, in their first reign as a team and individually. They won the title by defeating United Empire (Will Ospreay, Henare, and Great-O-Khan) at King of Pro-Wrestling in Tokyo, Japan, on October 12, 2026.

== Title history ==
Key
| No. | Overall reign number |
| Reign | Reign number for the specific team—reign numbers for the individuals are in parentheses, if different |
| Days | Number of days held |
| Defenses | Number of successful defenses |
| + | Current reign is changing daily |

| No. | Champion | Championship change | | | Reign statistics | | | Notes | Ref. |
| No. | Champion | Date | Event | Location | Reign | Days | Defenses | Notes | Ref. |
|---|---|---|---|---|---|---|---|---|---|
New Japan Pro Wrestling (NJPW)
| 1 | Toru Yano and The Briscoe Brothers (Jay Briscoe and Mark Briscoe) | January 4, 2016 | Wrestle Kingdom 10 in Tokyo Dome | Tokyo, Japan | 1 | 38 | 1 | Defeated Bullet Club (Bad Luck Fale, Tama Tonga and Yujiro Takahashi) to become the inaugural champions. | |
| 2 | Bullet Club (Bad Luck Fale, Tama Tonga and Yujiro Takahashi) | February 11, 2016 | The New Beginning in Osaka | Osaka, Japan | 1 | 3 | 0 | | |
| 3 | Toru Yano and The Briscoe Brothers (Jay Briscoe and Mark Briscoe) | February 14, 2016 | The New Beginning in Niigata | Nagaoka, Japan | 2 | 6 | 0 | | |
| 4 | The Elite (Kenny Omega, Matt Jackson and Nick Jackson) | February 20, 2016 | Honor Rising: Japan 2016 | Tokyo, Japan | 1 | 50 | 2 | | |
| 5 | Hiroshi Tanahashi, Michael Elgin and Yoshitatsu | April 10, 2016 | Invasion Attack 2016 | Tokyo, Japan | 1 | 23 | 1 | | |
| 6 | The Elite (Kenny Omega, Matt Jackson and Nick Jackson) | May 3, 2016 | Wrestling Dontaku 2016 | Fukuoka, Japan | 2 | 61 | 0 | | |
| 7 | Matt Sydal, Ricochet and Satoshi Kojima | July 3, 2016 | Kizuna Road 2016 | Takizawa, Japan | 1 | 84 | 0 | | |
| — | Vacated | September 25, 2016 | — | — | — | — | — | Title vacated due to Sydal failing to make a scheduled championship defense because of "travel issues". | |
| 8 | David Finlay, Ricochet and Satoshi Kojima | September 25, 2016 | Destruction in Kobe | Kobe, Japan | 1 (1, 2, 2) | 101 | 1 | Defeated Superkliq (Adam Cole, Matt Jackson and Nick Jackson) to win the vacant title. | |
| 9 | Los Ingobernables de Japón (Bushi, Evil and Sanada) | January 4, 2017 | Wrestle Kingdom 11 in Tokyo Dome | Tokyo, Japan | 1 | 1 | 0 | This was a gauntlet match, also involving Bullet Club (Bad Luck Fale, Hangman Page and Yujiro Takahashi) and Chaos (Jado, Will Ospreay and Yoshi-Hashi). | |
| 10 | Taguchi Japan (Hiroshi Tanahashi, Manabu Nakanishi and Ryusuke Taguchi) | January 5, 2017 | New Year Dash!! | Tokyo, Japan | 1 (2, 1, 1) | 37 | 0 | | |
| 11 | Los Ingobernables de Japón (Bushi, Evil and Sanada) | February 11, 2017 | The New Beginning in Osaka | Osaka, Japan | 2 | 52 | 1 | | |
| 12 | Taguchi Japan (Hiroshi Tanahashi, Ricochet and Ryusuke Taguchi) | April 4, 2017 | Road to Sakura Genesis 2017 | Tokyo, Japan | 1 (3, 3, 2) | 29 | 0 | | |
| 13 | Los Ingobernables de Japón (Bushi, Evil and Sanada) | May 3, 2017 | Wrestling Dontaku 2017 | Fukuoka, Japan | 3 | 228 | 3 | | |
| 14 | Bullet Club (Bad Luck Fale, Tama Tonga and Tanga Loa) | December 17, 2017 | Road to Tokyo Dome | Tokyo, Japan | 1 (2, 2, 1) | 18 | 0 | | |
| 15 | Chaos (Beretta, Tomohiro Ishii and Toru Yano) | January 4, 2018 | Wrestle Kingdom 12 in Tokyo Dome | Tokyo, Japan | 1 (1, 1, 3) | 1 | 0 | This was a gauntlet match, also involving Michael Elgin and War Machine (Hanson and Raymond Rowe), Suzuki-gun (Taichi, Takashi Iizuka and Zack Sabre Jr.) and Taguchi Japan (Juice Robinson, Ryusuke Taguchi and Togi Makabe). | |
| 16 | Bullet Club (Bad Luck Fale, Tama Tonga and Tanga Loa | January 5, 2018 | New Year Dash!! | Tokyo, Japan | 2 (3, 3, 2) | 118 | 3 | | |
| 17 | Super Villains (Marty Scurll, Matt Jackson and Nick Jackson) | May 3, 2018 | Wrestling Dontaku 2018 | Fukuoka, Japan | 1 (1, 3, 3) | 101 | 0 | | |
| 18 | Bullet Club (Tama Tonga, Tanga Loa and Taiji Ishimori) | August 12, 2018 | G1 Climax 28 | Tokyo, Japan | 1 (4, 3, 1) | 171 | 2 | | |
| 19 | Ryusuke Taguchi, Togi Makabe and Toru Yano | January 30, 2019 | Road to The New Beginning | Miyagi, Japan | 1 (3, 1, 4) | 340 | 4 | | |
| 20 | Los Ingobernables de Japón (Bushi, Evil and Shingo Takagi) | January 5, 2020 | Wrestle Kingdom 14 in Tokyo Dome | Tokyo, Japan | 1 (4, 4, 1) | 208 | 2 | This was a gauntlet match, also involving Bullet Club (Bad Luck Fale, Yujiro Takahashi, and Chase Owens), Chaos (Tomohiro Ishii, Yoshi-Hashi, and Robbie Eagles) and Suzuki-gun (Taichi, El Desperado, and Yoshinobu Kanemaru). | |
| — | Vacated | July 31, 2020 | — | — | — | — | — | After leaving Los Ingobernables de Japón during the finals of the New Japan Cup on July 11, 2020, Evil claimed on July 12 that he had "no interest" in defending the title with his former stablemates, leading NJPW to eventually vacate the championship. | |
| 21 | Chaos (Hirooki Goto, Tomohiro Ishii and Yoshi-Hashi) | August 9, 2020 | Summer Struggle 2020 | Tokyo, Japan | 1 (1, 2, 1) | 454 | 9 | Defeated fellow Chaos stablemates Kazuchika Okada, Toru Yano and Sho in the finals of an eight-team tournament to win the vacant titles. | |
| 22 | House of Torture (Evil, Sho and Yujiro Takahashi) | November 6, 2021 | Power Struggle | Osaka, Japan | 1 (5, 1, 2) | 241 | 4 | | |
| 23 | Chaos (Hirooki Goto, Yoshi-Hashi and Yoh) | July 5, 2022 | New Japan Road | Tokyo, Japan | 1 (2, 1, 2) | 80 | 0 | | |
| 24 | House of Torture (Evil, Sho and Yujiro Takahashi) | September 23, 2022 | New Japan Burning Spirit | Takamatsu, Japan | 2 (6, 2, 3) | 141 | 1 | This was a tornado dog cage match. | |
| 25 | Strong Style (Ren Narita, Minoru Suzuki and El Desperado) | February 11, 2023 | The New Beginning in Osaka | Osaka, Japan | 1 | 81 | 1 | If House of Torture did not defend, they would have been stripped of the titles. | |
| 26 | Hiroshi Tanahashi and Chaos (Tomohiro Ishii and Kazuchika Okada) | May 3, 2023 | Wrestling Dontaku | Fukuoka, Japan | 1 (4, 3, 1) | 266 | 8 | | |
| — | Vacated | January 24, 2024 | Road to the New Beginning 2024 | Tokyo, Japan | — | — | — | After a successful defense against The Mighty Don't Kneel (Kosei Fujita, Mikey Nicholls and Shane Haste), Okada, whose contract with NJPW expired on that day, announced that he was vacating the titles. | |
| 27 | Hiroshi Tanahashi, Toru Yano and Oleg Boltin | April 14, 2024 | Wrestling World 2024 in Taiwan | Taipei, Taiwan | 1 (5, 5, 1) | 56 | 1 | Defeated House of Torture (Evil, Sho and Yoshinobu Kanemaru) in a four-team tournament to win the vacant titles. | |
| 28 | Los Ingobernables de Japón (Yota Tsuji, Bushi and Hiromu Takahashi) | June 9, 2024 | Dominion 6.9 in Osaka-jo Hall | Osaka, Japan | 1 (1, 5, 1) | 7 | 0 | | |
| 29 | Hiroshi Tanahashi, Toru Yano and Oleg Boltin | June 16, 2024 | New Japan Soul 2024 | Sapporo, Japan | 2 (6, 6, 2) | 228 | 2 | | |
| 30 | House of Torture (Sho, Yujiro Takahashi and Ren Narita) | January 30, 2025 | Road to the New Beginning: Night 3 | Sendai, Japan | 1 (2, 3, 4) | 155 | 1 | Narita, Sho and Takahashi held the titles as a Bullet Club contingent under the House of Torture subgroup until May 3, 2025, at Wrestling Dontaku where House of Torture split up from Bullet Club to act as a separate unit. | |
| 31 | Toru Yano and Master Wato and Yoh | July 4, 2025 | New Japan Soul: Night 8 | Tokyo, Japan | 1 (7, 1, 2) | 184 | 2 | | |
| 32 | TMDK (Zack Sabre Jr., Ryohei Oiwa, and Hartley Jackson) | January 4, 2026 | Wrestle Kingdom 20 | Tokyo, Japan | 1 | 15 | 0 | Last eliminated Boltin Oleg and Bishamon (Hirooki Goto and Yoshi-Hashi) in a Ranbo. | |
| 33 | Boltin Oleg and Bishamon (Hirooki Goto and Yoshi-Hashi) | January 19, 2026 | Road to the New Beginning: Night 1 | Tokyo, Japan | 1 (3, 3, 3) | 105 | 2 | | |
| 34 | United Empire (Will Ospreay, Henare, and Great-O-Khan) | May 4, 2026 | Wrestling Dontaku; Night 2 | Fukuoka, Japan | 1 | 161 | 0 | | |
| 35 | Unbound Co. (Yuto-Ice, Oskar, and Jeff Cobb) | October 12, 2026 | King of Pro-Wrestling | Tokyo, Japan | 1 | 37+ | 0 | | |

== Combined reigns ==
As of November 18, 2026.

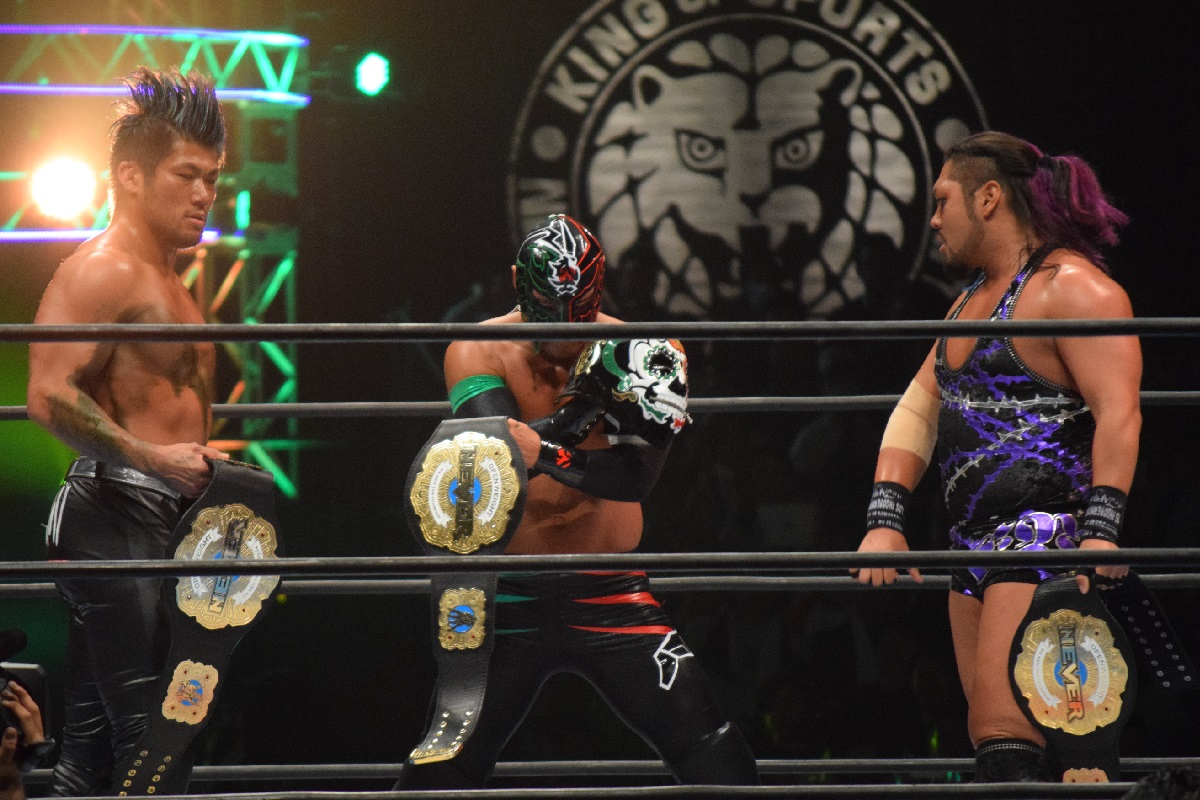
Record three-time champions Los Ingobernables de Japón (Sanada, Bushi, and Evil)

| † | Indicates the current champion |

=== By team ===
| Rank | Team | No. of reigns | Combined defenses | Combined days |
|---|---|---|---|---|
| 1 | Chaos (Hirooki Goto, Tomohiro Ishii, and Yoshi-Hashi) | 1 | 9 | 454 |
| 2 | House of Torture (Evil, Sho, and Yujiro Takahashi) | 2 | 5 | 382 |
| 3 | Ryusuke Taguchi, Togi Makabe, and Toru Yano | 1 | 4 | 340 |
| 4 | Hiroshi Tanahashi, Toru Yano, and Oleg Boltin | 2 | 3 | 284 |
| 5 | Los Ingobernables de Japón (Bushi, Evil, and Sanada) | 3 | 4 | 281 |
| 6 | Hiroshi Tanahashi and Chaos (Tomohiro Ishii and Kazuchika Okada) | 1 | 8 | 266 |
| 7 | Los Ingobernables de Japón (Bushi, Evil, and Shingo Takagi) | 1 | 2 | 208 |
| 8 | Toru Yano and Spiritech (Master Wato and Yoh) | 1 | 2 | 184 |
| 9 | Bullet Club (Tama Tonga, Tanga Loa, and Taiji Ishimori) | 1 | 2 | 171 |
| 10 | United Empire (Will Ospreay, Henare, and Great-O-Khan) | 1 | 0 | 161 |
| 11 | House of Torture (Ren Narita, Sho, and Yujiro Takahashi) | 1 | 1 | 155 |
| 12 | Bullet Club (Bad Luck Fale, Tama Tonga, and Tanga Loa) | 2 | 3 | 136 |
| 13 | The Elite (Kenny Omega, Matt Jackson, and Nick Jackson) | 2 | 2 | 111 |
| 14 | Boltin Oleg and Bishamon (Hirooki Goto and Yoshi-Hashi) | 1 | 2 | 105 |
| 15 | David Finlay Jr., Ricochet, and Satoshi Kojima | 1 | 1 | 101 |
| 15 | Super Villains (Marty Scurll, Matt Jackson, and Nick Jackson) | 1 | 0 | 101 |
| 17 | Matt Sydal, Ricochet, and Satoshi Kojima | 1 | 0 | 84 |
| 18 | Strong Style (Ren Narita, Minoru Suzuki, and El Desperado) | 1 | 1 | 81 |
| 19 | Chaos (Hirooki Goto, Yoh, and Yoshi-Hashi) | 1 | 0 | 80 |
| 20 | Chaos (Jay Briscoe, Mark Briscoe, and Toru Yano) | 2 | 1 | 44 |
| 21 | Unbound Co. † (Yuto-Ice, Oskar, and Jeff Cobb) | 1 | 0 | 37+ |
| 22 | Taguchi Japan (Hiroshi Tanahashi, Manabu Nakanishi, and Ryusuke Taguchi) | 1 | 0 | 37 |
| 23 | Taguchi Japan (Hiroshi Tanahashi, Ricochet, and Ryusuke Taguchi) | 1 | 0 | 29 |
| 24 | Hiroshi Tanahashi, Michael Elgin, and Yoshitatsu | 1 | 1 | 23 |
| 25 | TMDK (Zack Sabre Jr., Ryohei Oiwa, and Hartley Jackson) | 1 | 0 | 15 |
| 26 | Los Ingobernables de Japón (Yota Tsuji, Bushi and Hiromu Takahashi) | 1 | 0 | 7 |
| 27 | Bullet Club (Bad Luck Fale, Tama Tonga, and Yujiro Takahashi) | 1 | 0 | 3 |
| 28 | Chaos (Beretta, Tomohiro Ishii, and Toru Yano) | 1 | 0 | 1 |

=== By wrestler ===
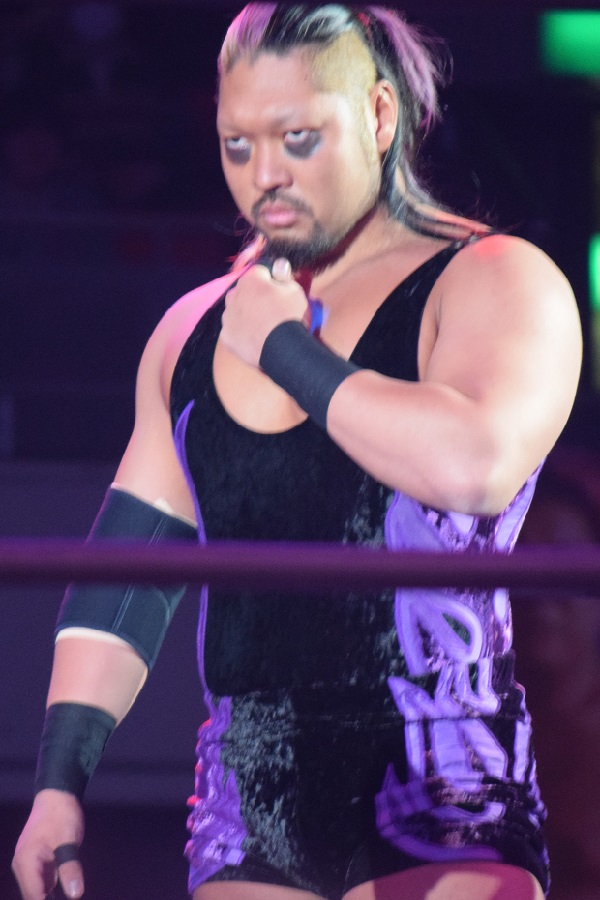
Evil holds the record for most combined days as champion with 871.

| Rank | Wrestler | No. of reigns | Combined defenses | Combined days |
|---|---|---|---|---|
| 1 | Evil | 6 | 11 | 871 |
| 2 | Toru Yano | 7 | 10 | 853 |
| 3 | Tomohiro Ishii | 3 | 17 | 721 |
| 4 | Hiroshi Tanahashi | 6 | 12 | 639 |
| 5 | Hirooki Goto | 3 | 11 | 639 |
| 5 | Yoshi-Hashi | 3 | 11 | 639 |
| 7 | Yujiro Takahashi | 4 | 5 | 540 |
| 8 | Sho | 3 | 5 | 537 |
| 9 | Bushi | 5 | 6 | 496 |
| 10 | Ryusuke Taguchi | 3 | 4 | 406 |
| 11 | Oleg Boltin | 3 | 5 | 389 |
| 12 | Togi Makabe | 1 | 4 | 340 |
| 13 | Tama Tonga | 4 | 5 | 310 |
| 14 | Tanga Loa | 3 | 5 | 310 |
| 15 | Sanada | 3 | 4 | 281 |
| 16 | Kazuchika Okada | 1 | 8 | 266 |
| 17 | Yoh | 2 | 2 | 264 |
| 18 | Ren Narita | 2 | 1 | 236 |
| 19 | Ricochet | 3 | 1 | 214 |
| 20 | Matt Jackson | 3 | 2 | 212 |
| 20 | Nick Jackson | 3 | 2 | 212 |
| 22 | Shingo Takagi | 1 | 2 | 208 |
| 23 | Satoshi Kojima | 2 | 1 | 185 |
| 24 | Master Wato | 1 | 2 | 184 |
| 25 | Taiji Ishimori | 1 | 2 | 171 |
| 26 | Will Ospreay | 1 | 0 | 161 |
| 26 | Henare | 1 | 0 | 161 |
| 26 | Great-O-Khan | 1 | 0 | 161 |
| 29 | Bad Luck Fale | 3 | 3 | 139 |
| 30 | Kenny Omega | 2 | 2 | 111 |
| 31 | David Finlay Jr. | 1 | 0 | 101 |
| 32 | Marty Scurll | 1 | 0 | 101 |
| 33 | Matt Sydal | 1 | 0 | 84 |
| 34 | El Desperado | 1 | 1 | 81 |
| 34 | Minoru Suzuki | 1 | 1 | 81 |
| 36 | Jay Briscoe | 2 | 1 | 44 |
| 36 | Mark Briscoe | 2 | 1 | 44 |
| 38 | Yuto-Ice † | 1 | 0 | 37+ |
| 38 | Oskar † | 1 | 0 | 37+ |
| 38 | Jeff Cobb † | 1 | 0 | 37+ |
| 41 | Manabu Nakanishi | 1 | 0 | 37 |
| 42 | Michael Elgin | 1 | 1 | 23 |
| 42 | Yoshitatsu | 1 | 1 | 23 |
| 44 | Hartley Jackson | 1 | 0 | 15 |
| 44 | Ryohei Oiwa | 1 | 0 | 15 |
| 44 | Zack Sabre Jr. | 1 | 0 | 15 |
| 47 | Hiromu Takahashi | 1 | 0 | 7 |
| 47 | Yota Tsuji | 1 | 0 | 7 |
| 49 | Beretta | 1 | 0 | 1 |
