= Oleg Boltin =

Kazakh professional wrestler (born 1993)

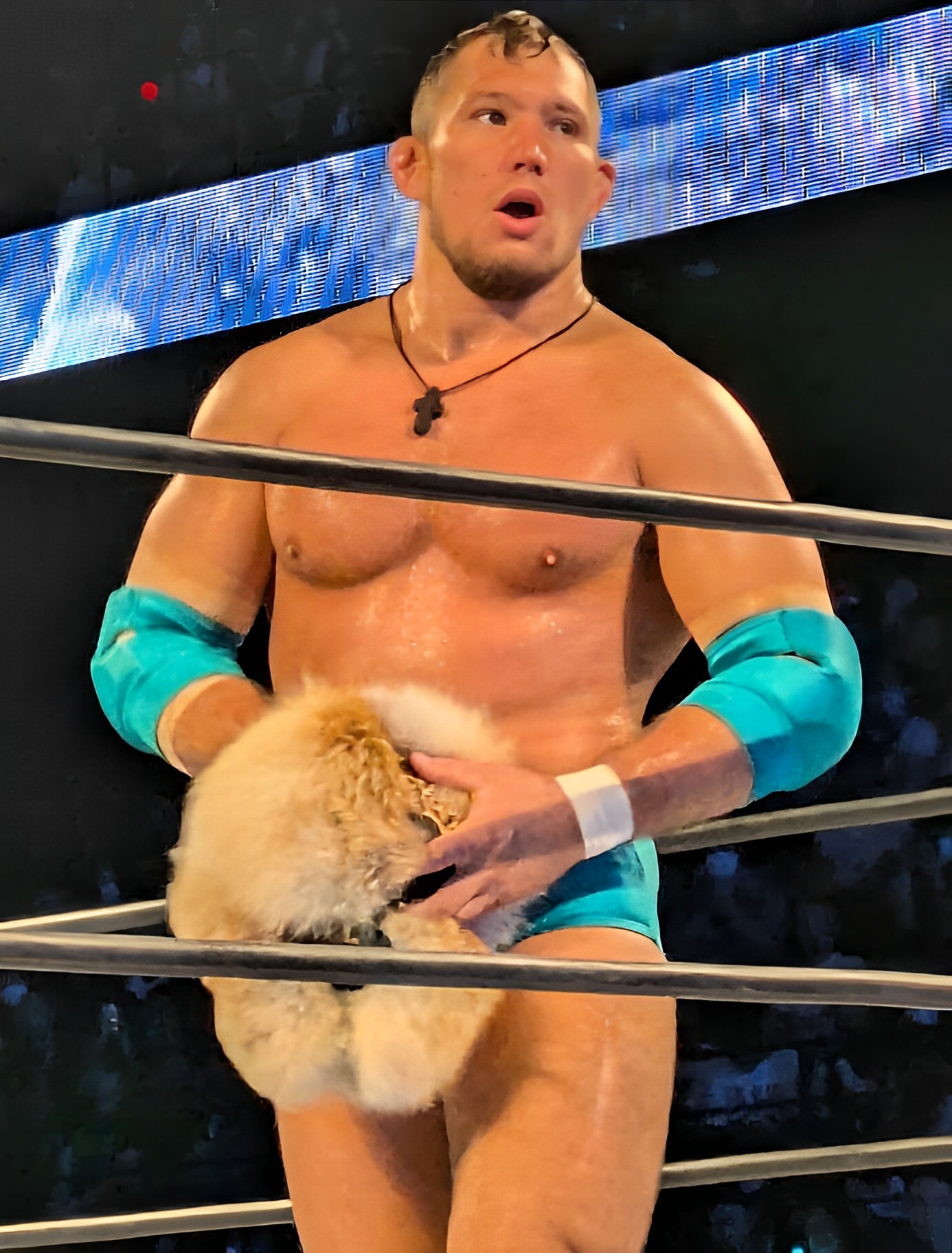
- Oleg Boltin in 2024

Personal information
- Born: Oleg Igorevich Boltin; February 10, 1993 (age 33) Ridder, Kazakhstan

Professional wrestling career
- Ring name(s): Boltin Oleg; Masked Boltin; Oleg Boltin
- Billed height: 187 cm (6 ft 2 in)
- Billed weight: 120 kg (265 lb)
- Billed from: Almaty, Kazakhstan
- Trained by: NJPW Dojo; Yuji Nagata
- Debut: April 2, 2023
- Sports career
Medal record
Men's freestyle wrestling
Representing Kazakhstan
Asian Championships
Gold medal – first place	2021 Almaty	125 kg
Grand Prix
Silver medal – second place	2018 New York	125 kg
Silver medal – second place	2019 Taras	125 kg
Bronze medal – third place	2017 Minsk	125 kg
Bronze medal – third place	2017 Taras	125 kg
Bronze medal – third place	2018 Ulaanbaatar	125 kg
Bronze medal – third place	2019 Sassari	125 kg
Bronze medal – third place	2021 Kaspisk	125 kg
Bronze medal – third place	2022 Bucharest	125 kg

Oleg Igorevich Boltin (Note: Kazakh: Олег Игоревич Болтин) (born February 10, 1993) is a Kazakh professional wrestler and former freestyle wrestler. He is signed to New Japan Pro-Wrestling (NJPW), where he performs under the ring name Boltin Oleg (Note: As it is custom in Japan when it comes to Slavic languages (akin to Japanese language names and customs), the name as stated is ordered Boltin Oleg.) (ボルチン・オレッグ, Boruchin Oreggu) and is the current Strong Openweight Champion in his first reign. He is also a former one-time NEVER Openweight Champion. As a freestyle wrestler, he was the gold medalist of the 125 kg (275 lb) division at the 2021 Asian Wrestling Championships.

== Early life ==
Oleg Igorevich Boltin was born on February 10, 1993 in Ridder, East Kazakhstan Region, Kazakhstan.

== Freestyle wrestling career ==
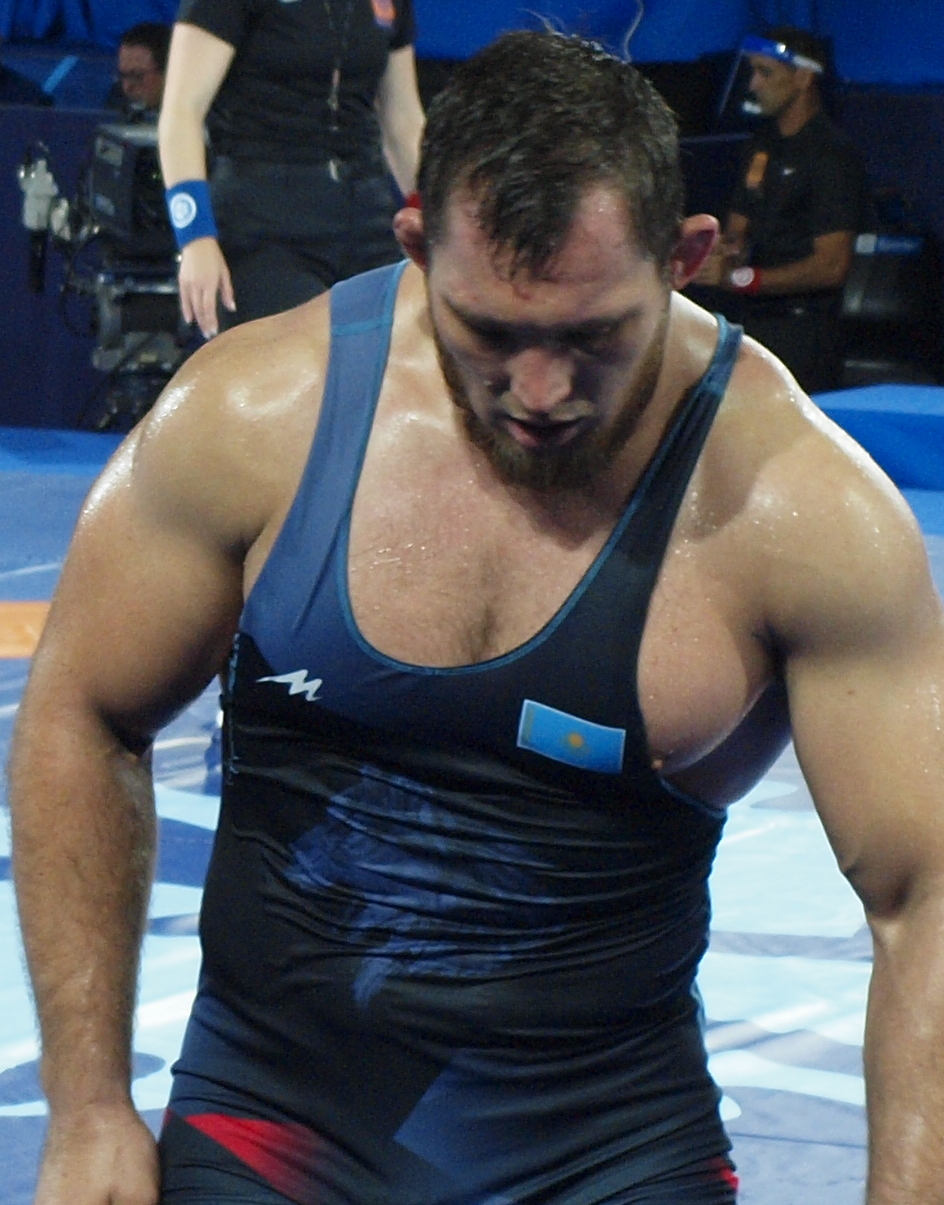
Boltin at the 2021 World Wrestling Championships

Boltin had been training in freestyle wrestling in Japan since the early 2010s. In 2017, he joined the Bushiroad Club (later known as Team New Japan).

In 2020, Boltin won the gold medal at the Kazakhstani Wrestling Championships in the 125 kg category. In the same category, he won the gold medal at the 2021 Asian Wrestling Championships. Boltin finished in fifth-place at the 2021 World Wrestling Championships. In October 2022, he retired from amateur wrestling after he signed a contract with the Japanese professional wrestling promotion New Japan Pro-Wrestling (NJPW).

== Professional wrestling career ==
=== New Japan Pro-Wrestling (2022–present) ===
On October 10, 2022, at Declaration of Power, Yuji Nagata introduced Boltin as a future NJPW wrestler, the first from Kazakhstan since Vladimir Berkovich in 1990. Boltin, in turn, expressed a desire to become as "strong and famous as possible", and cited The Rock and Brock Lesnar as role models. Boltin's first in-ring match as "Young Lion" took place on January 4, 2023, at Wrestle Kingdom 17, where he had a three-minute exhibition match against Ryohei Oiwa on the pre-show. The match ended in a draw. He made his official in-ring debut at night two of Road To Sakura Genesis on April 2, where he, Ryusuke Taguchi, and Shota Umino lost to TMDK (Zack Sabre Jr., Robbie Eagles, and Kosei Fujita). On May 28, at day 12 of the 2023 Best of the Super Juniors, Boltin earned his first win when he teamed up with Togi Makabe to defeat Yuto Nakashima and Oskar Leube.

In March 2024, Boltin began teaming up with Hiroshi Tanahashi and Toru Yano. The trio defeated House of Torture (Evil, Sho, and Yoshinobu Kanemaru) at Wrestling World 2024 in Taiwan to win the vacant NEVER Openweight 6-Man Tag Team Championship. Yano, Tanahashi, and Boltin lost the titles to Yota Tsuji, Bushi, and Hiromu Takahashi at Dominion 6.9 in Osaka-jo Hall, but regained them the following week at New Japan Soul 2024. Boltin then competed in his first ever G1 Climax tournament, where he was placed in B-Block and finished with 8 points and failed to advance to the playoff stage. During the tournament, Boltin retired his black "Young Lion" gear in favor of light blue gear and a malahi for his entrance, officially graduating from his "Young Lion" status.

Oleg Boltin Entrance at G1 Climax 35, Fukuoka in August 2025

In January 2025, Yano, Tanahashi, and Boltin lost the titles to House of Torture (Yujiro Takahashi, Ren Narita, and Sho). At Dominion 6.15 in Osaka-jo Hall, Boltin defeated Konosuke Takeshita to win the NEVER Openweight Championship. This marked Boltin's first ever singles championship in his career. His reign as NEVER Openweight Champion ended on October 13 at King of Pro-Wrestling after losing to Evil.

On January 19, 2026, during the Road to The New Beginning tour, Oleg teamed with Bishamon (Hirooki Goto and Yoshi-Hashi) as Bishamon-tin to defeat TMDK (Hartley Jackson, Ryohei Oiwa, and Zack Sabre Jr.) to win the NEVER Openweight 6-Man Tag Team Championship. On February 27, 2026, at The New Beginning USA, Boltin wrestled his first match in the United States and defeated Tomohiro Ishii to win the Strong Openweight Championship. On Night 2 of Wrestling Dontaku on May 4, 2026, Bishamon-tin lost their titles to the United Empire (Great-O-Khan, Henare, and Will Ospreay). In the same month, NJPW announced that Oleg would be sidelined due to an elbow injury. Oleg would return in time for the 2026 G1 Climax.

== Name clarification ==
Although NJPW had occasionally referred to Oleg by his birth name "Oleg Boltin", the promotion has since given him the ring name "Boltin Oleg". This ring name follows Japanese language naming customs.

== Personal life ==
He is of Kazakh descent. Boltin speaks Japanese fluently.

== Championships and accomplishments ==
=== Freestyle wrestling ===
- Asian Wrestling Championships
  - 2021 Asian Wrestling Championships gold medalist (125 kg)
- Kazakhstani Wrestling Championships
  - 2020 Kazakhstani Wrestling Championships gold medalist (125 kg)

=== Professional wrestling ===
In New Japan Pro-Wrestling, Boltin is a one-time Strong Openweight Champion.

- New Japan Pro-Wrestling
  - Strong Openweight Championship (1 time, current)
  - NEVER Openweight Championship (1 time)
  - NEVER Openweight 6-Man Tag Team Championship (3 times) – with Hiroshi Tanahashi and Toru Yano (2) and Hirooki Goto and Yoshi-Hashi (1)
  - G1 Climax Awards (1 time)
    - Outstanding Achievement Award (2026)
- Pro Wrestling Illustrated
  - Ranked No. 91 of the top 500 singles wrestlers in the PWI 500 in 2026
- Tokyo Sports
  - Newcomer Award (2024)
