= Destruction in Kobe (2025) =

2025 New Japan Pro-Wrestling event

- Promotional poster featuring Hiroshi Tanahashi
- Promotion: New Japan Pro-Wrestling
- Date: September 28, 2025
- City: Kobe, Japan
- Venue: Kobe World Memorial Hall
- Attendance: 4,674

Event chronology
← Previous; Forbidden Door	Next → Historic X-Over in Guangzhou

Destruction chronology
← Previous; Kobe (2024)	Next → Kobe (2026)

Destruction in Kobe (2025) was a professional wrestling event promoted by New Japan Pro-Wrestling (NJPW) that place at Kobe World Memorial Hall in Kobe, Japan on September 28, 2025. It was the twenty-seventh event in the Destruction chronology.

== Production ==
=== Storylines ===
Destruction in Kobe will feature professional wrestling matches that will involve different wrestlers from pre-existing scripted feuds and storylines. Wrestlers portrayed villains, heroes, or less distinguishable characters in the scripted events that built tension and culminated in a wrestling match or series of matches.

Taiji Ishimori is scheduled to challenge Hiromu Takahashi for the GHC Junior Heavyweight Championship. The winner of this match will face Eita on October 11.

== Results ==
No.	Results	Stipulations	Times
1	Shota Umino, Yuya Uemura, Yoshi-Hashi, El Desperado and Yoh defeated House of Torture (Evil, Sanada, Dick Togo, Douki and Sho) by pinfall	Ten-man tag team match	7:35
2	Hiroshi Tanahashi defeated Great-O-Khan by pinfall	Singles match	7:45
3	Boltin Oleg (c) defeated Don Fale (with Evil and Dick Togo) by pinfall	Singles match for the NEVER Openweight Championship	6:05
4	Knock Out Brothers (Oskar and Yuto-Ice) defeated Taichi and Tomohiro Ishii (c) by pinfall	Tag team match for the IWGP Tag Team Championship	13:30
5	Hiromu Takahashi (c) defeated Taiji Ishimori by pinfall	Singles match for the GHC Junior Heavyweight Championship	11:28
6	Yota Tsuji defeated David Finlay (with Gedo) by pinfall	Singles match	14:37
7	Gabe Kidd (c) defeated Shingo Takagi by pinfall	Singles match for the IWGP Global Heavyweight Championship	21:40
8	Zack Sabre Jr. (c) defeated Ren Narita by pinfall	Singles match for the IWGP World Heavyweight Championship	29:23
(c) / – the champion(s) heading into the match
