= The New Beginning USA (2026) =

2026 New Japan Pro-Wrestling professional wrestling event

The New Beginning in USA
- Promotion: New Japan Pro-Wrestling
- Date: February 27, 2026
- City: Trenton, New Jersey, United States
- Venue: CURE Insurance Arena
- Attendance: 2,605

Event chronology
← Previous; The New Beginning in Osaka	Next → NJPW 54th Anniversary Show

The New Beginning chronology
← Previous; Osaka (2026)	Next → —

The New Beginning in USA was a professional wrestling pay-per-view event promoted by New Japan Pro-Wrestling (NJPW). The event took place on February 27, 2026, in Trenton, New Jersey at the CURE Insurance Arena. It was the 44th event under the New Beginning name and streamed live on NJPW World.

Eight matches were contested at the event. In the main event, Yota Tsuji defeated Andrade El Ídolo to retain the IWGP Global Heavyweight Championship. In other prominent matches, Syuri defeated Athena to retain the IWGP Women's Championship, Knock Out Brothers (Yuto-Ice and Oskar) defeated GOA (Bishop Kaun and Toa Liona) to retain the IWGP Tag Team Championship, and Konosuke Takeshita defeated El Phantasmo in overtime to win the NJPW World Television Championship. The event also featured the final NJPW match of David Finlay.

== Production ==
=== Storylines ===
The New Beginning in Osaka featured professional wrestling matches that involves different wrestlers from pre-existing scripted feuds and storylines. Wrestlers portrayed villains, heroes, or less distinguishable characters in scripted events that built tension and culminated in a wrestling match or series of matches.

== Results ==
No.	Results	Stipulations	Times
1	David Finlay defeated Fred Rosser by pinfall	Singles match	12:21
2	Boltin Oleg defeated Tomohiro Ishii (c) by pinfall	Singles match for the Strong Openweight Championship	14:02
3	Ricochet (c) defeated Taiji Ishimori by pinfall	Singles match for the AEW National Championship	14:29
4	El Desperado and Kushida defeated Bustah and The Brain (Alec Price and Jordan Oliver) by pinfall	Tag team match	13:58
5	Konosuke Takeshita (with Rocky Romero) defeated El Phantasmo (c) (with Jado) by pinfall	Singles match for the NJPW World Television Championship	17:44 (Note: The match originally ended in a 15 minute time-limit draw, but was continued for a fixed time period of 5 minutes.)
6	Knock Out Brothers (Yuto-Ice and Oskar) (c) defeated GOA (Bishop Kaun and Toa Liona) by pinfall	Tag team match for the IWGP Tag Team Championship	17:58
7	Syuri (c) defeated Athena by pinfall	Singles match for the IWGP Women's Championship	17:55
8	Yota Tsuji (c) defeated Andrade El Ídolo by Submission	Singles match for the IWGP Global Heavyweight Championship	26:41
(c) / – the champion(s) heading into the match
