= Unbound Co. =

Professional wrestling stable

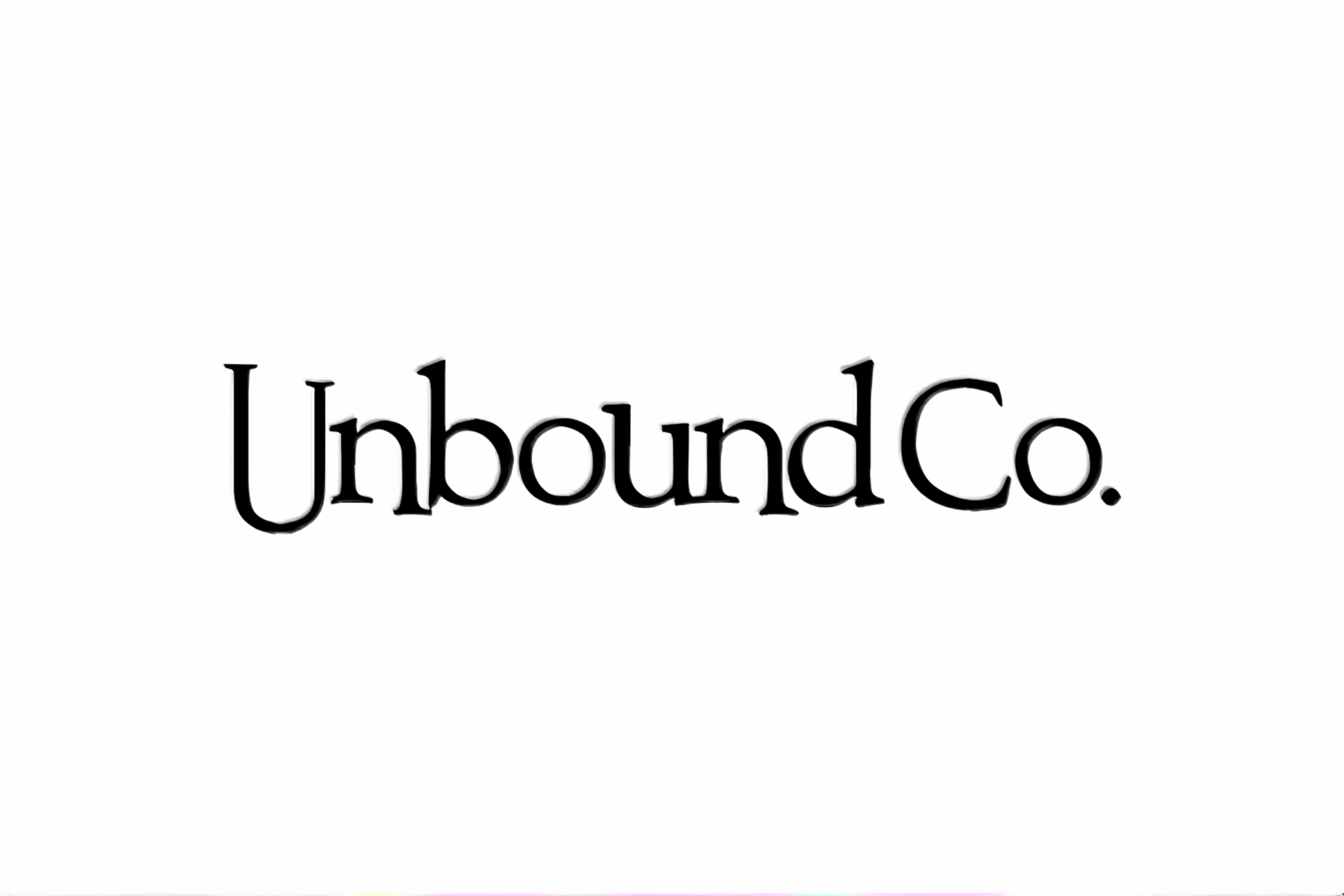
- Unbound Co. logo

Stable
- Name: Unbound Co.
- Members: See below
- Manager: Gedo
- Former members: Hiromu Takahashi; David Finlay; Clark Connors; Gabe Kidd
- Debut: January 5, 2026
- Years active: 2026–present

Unbound Co. (pronounced Unbound Company) (Japanese: アンバウンド・カンパニー, Hepburn: Anbaundo Kanpanī) is a Japanese professional wrestling stable performing in New Japan Pro-Wrestling (NJPW).

The group was formed in 2026 as a merger between Los Ingobernables de Japón spinoff Unaffiliated, consisting of former members of Los Ingobernables de Japon, and the Bullet Club sub-unit the War Dogs, led by David Finlay.

== History ==
At King of Pro-Wrestling on October 13, 2025, David Finlay and the Bullet Club War Dogs (Clark Connors, Drilla Moloney, Gabe Kidd, Gedo, Oskar, Robbie X, Taiji Ishimori, and Yuto-Ice) formed an alliance with the Unaffiliated stable (Shingo Takagi, Hiromu Takahashi, Titán, Yota Tsuji and Daiki Nagai). At New Year Dash!! on January 5, 2026, backstage, Tsuji announced the merger of both Bullet Club and the Unaffiliated stable, into the Unbound Co. stable.

However, several members left NJPW and the stable in February and March: first, Takahashi at The New Beginning in Osaka, then Finlay at The New Beginning USA, and then Connors and Kidd after signing with All Elite Wrestling (AEW). On March 6, 2026 at NJPW's 54th Anniversary Show, Ishimori and Robbie X defeated Ichiban Sweet Boys (Robbie Eagles and Kosei Fujita) to win the IWGP Junior Heavyweight Tag Team Championship. On April 4 at Sakura Genesis, Tsuji lost the IWGP Heavyweight Championship to Callum Newman, ending his reign at 90 days. After the match, Gabe Kidd returned to NJPW and attacked Tsuji and Takagi, confirming his departure from the stable. On April 25 at Wrestling RedZone, Ishimori and Robbie X lost their titles back to Ichiban Sweet Boys, ending their reign at 50 days. On night 1 of Wrestling Dontaku on May 3, Tsuji lost the Global Heavyweight Championship to Andrade El Idolo, ending his reign at 202 days. On June 14 at Dominion 6.14 in Osaka-jo Hall, Knock Out Brothers would lose the IWGP Tag Team Championship to Great-O-Khan and Henare, while Tsuji would regain the IWGP Heavyweight Championship from Callum Nemwn. On August 16, Jeff Cobb made his return to NJPW, joining the stable. Knock Out Brothers regained the IWGP Tag Team Championship from O-Khan and Henare on October 6 during the Road to King of Pro-Wrestling tour. On October 12 at King of Pro-Wrestling, Knock Out Brothers and Cobb defeated O-Khan, Henare, and Will Ospreay to win the NEVER Openweight Six-Man Tag Team Championship. On November 3 at Power Struggle, Ishimori and Robbie X defeated the Ichiban Sweet Boys to win the 2026 Super Junior Tag League.

== Members ==
Unbound Co.
Drilla Moloney

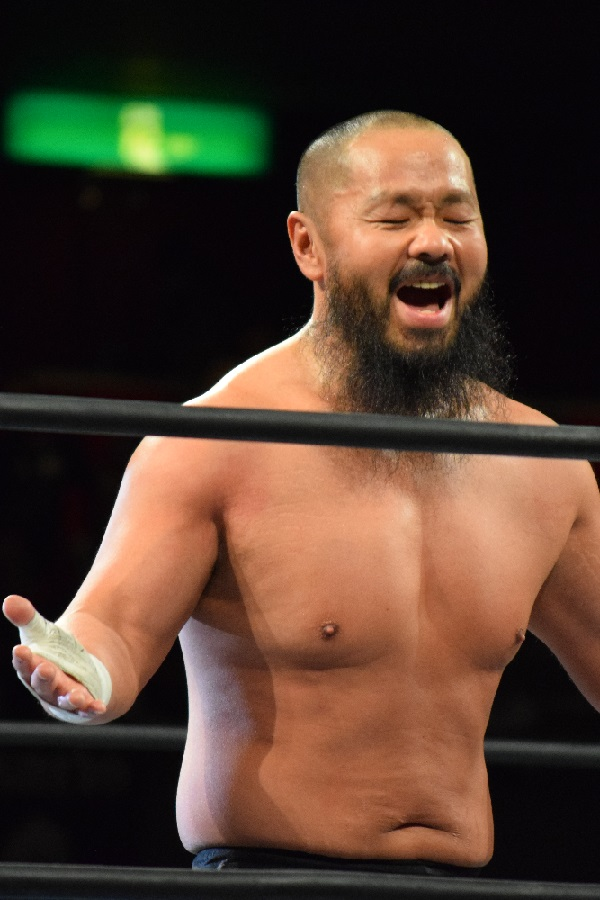
Gedo (M)

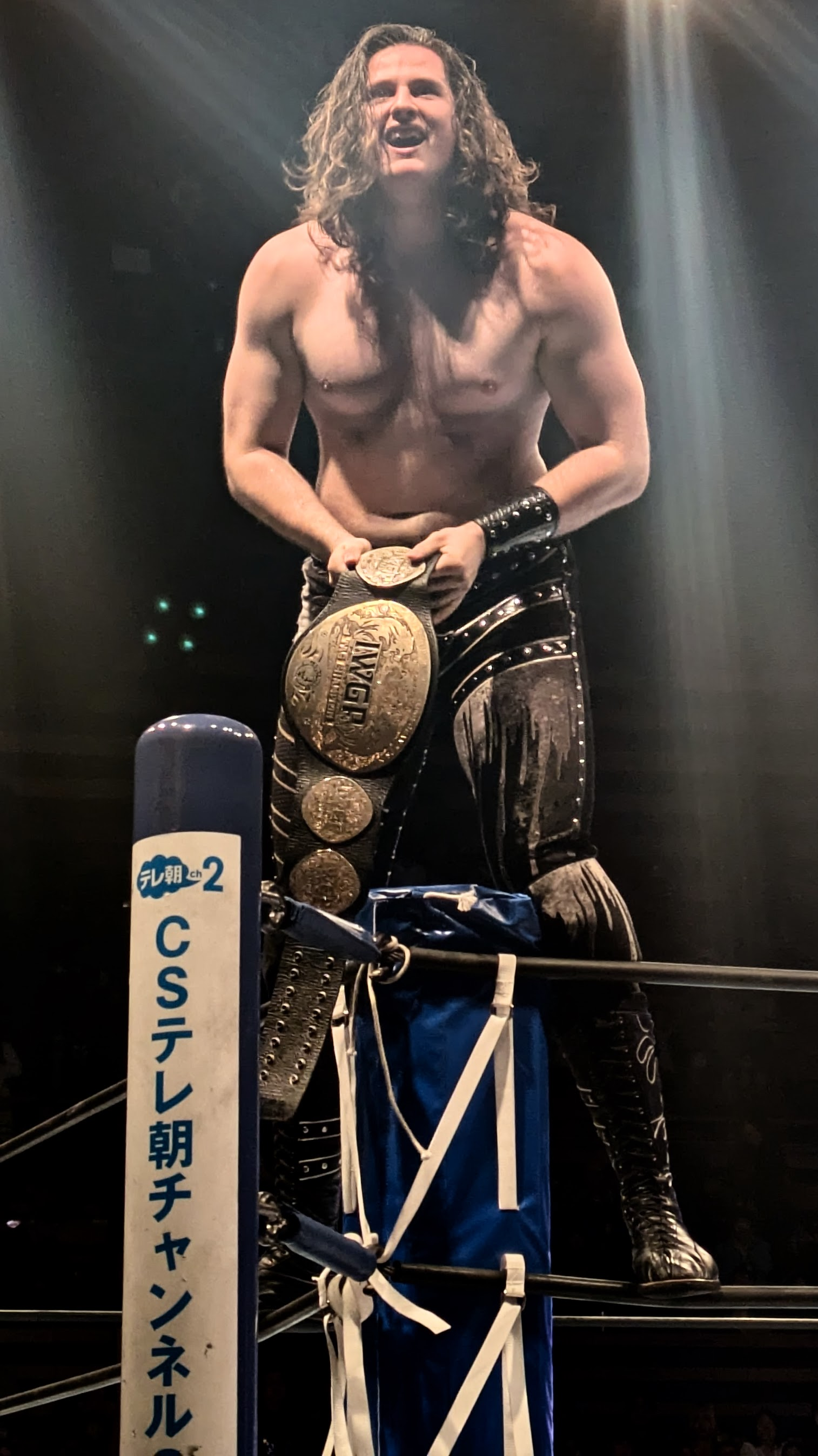
Oskar

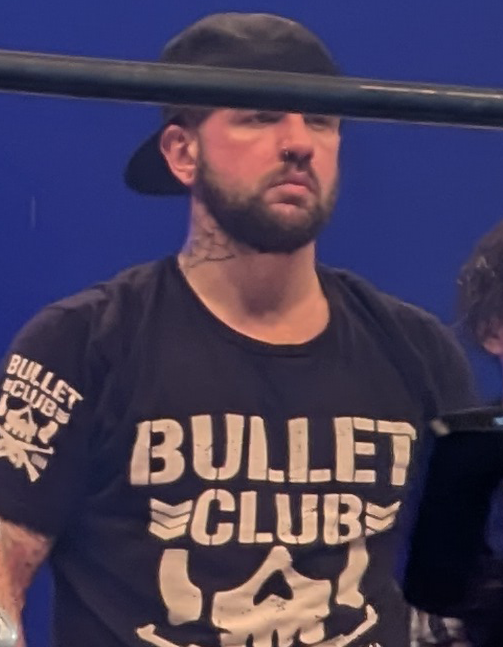
Robbie X

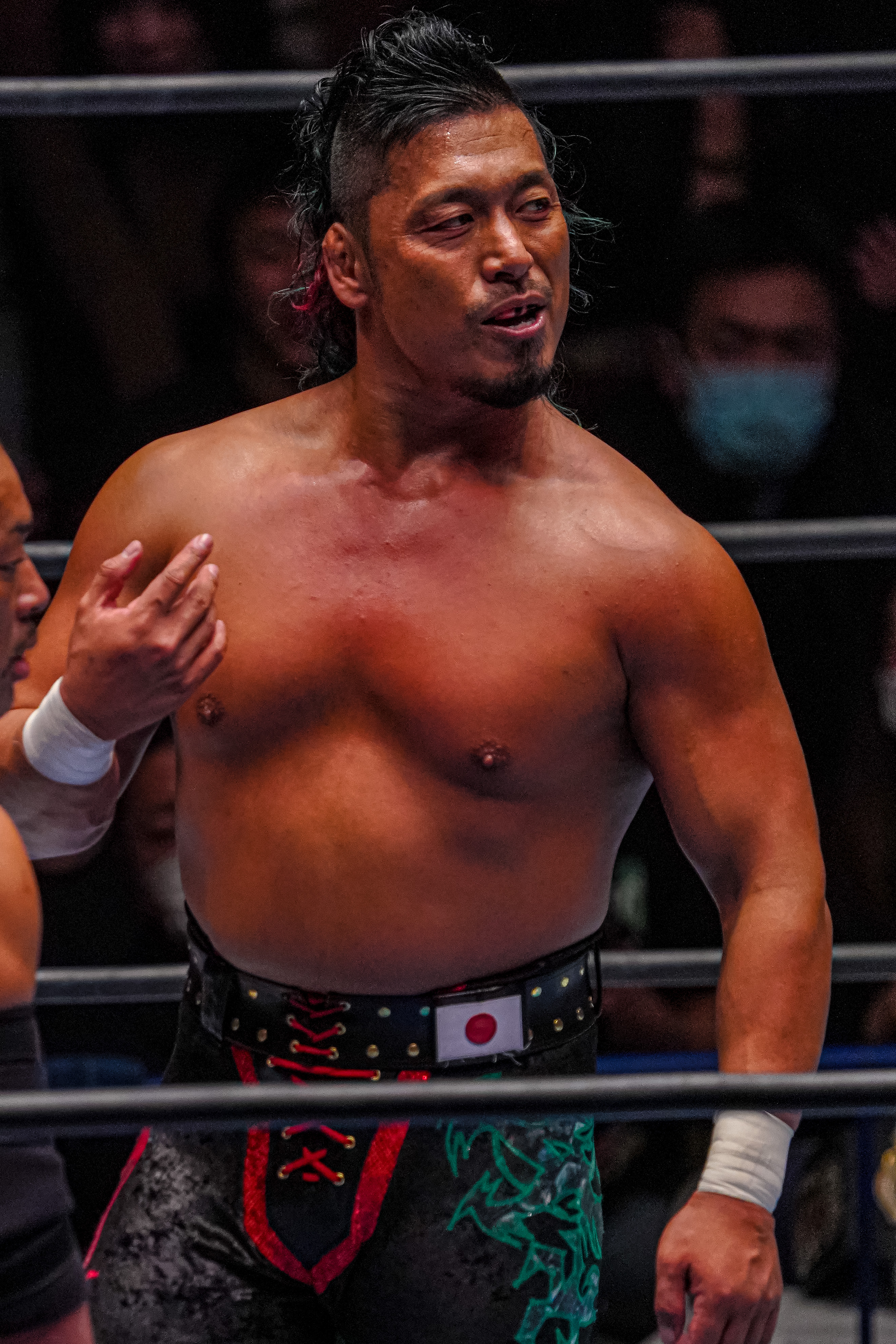
Shingo Takagi

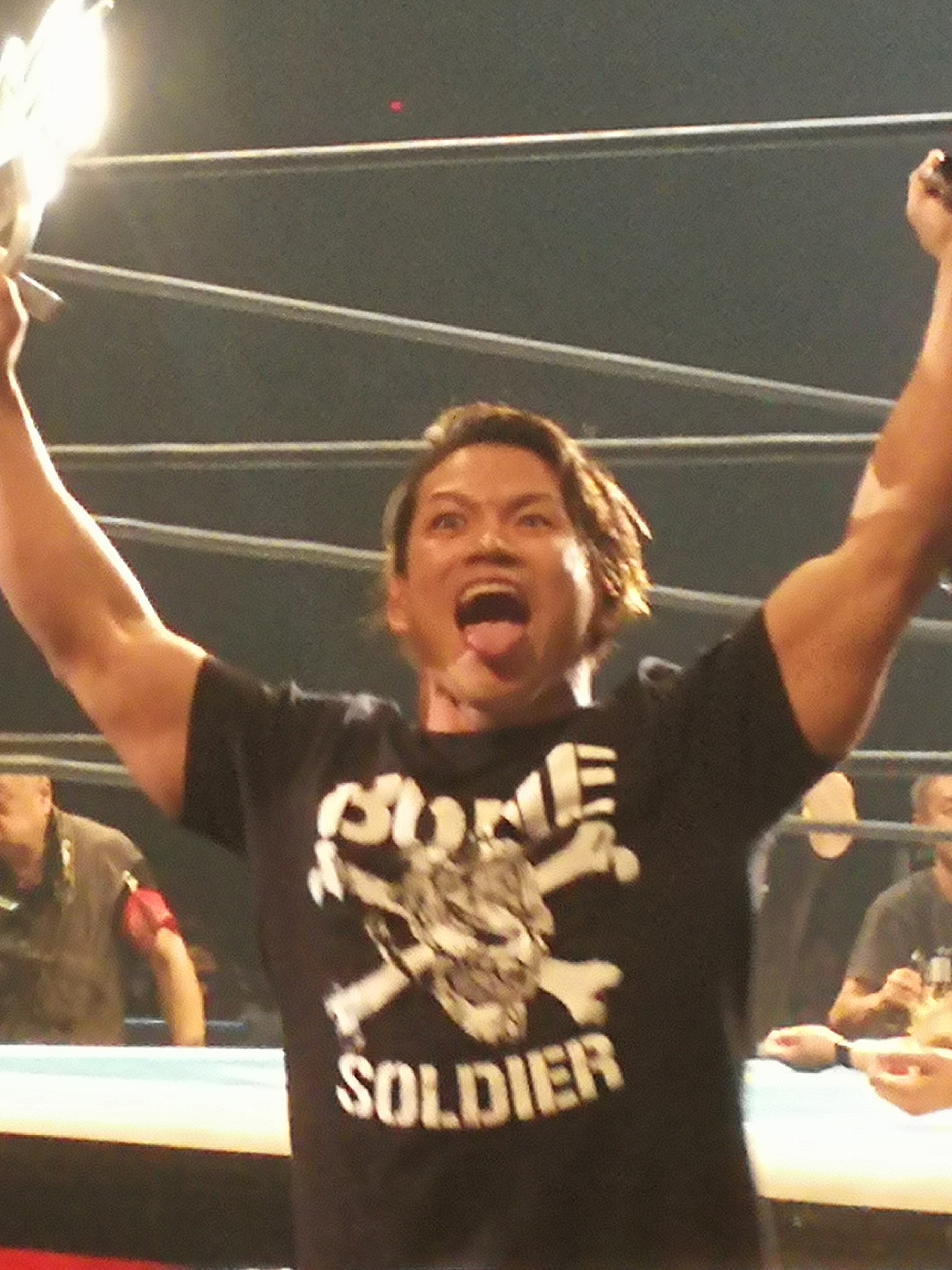
Taiji Ishimori

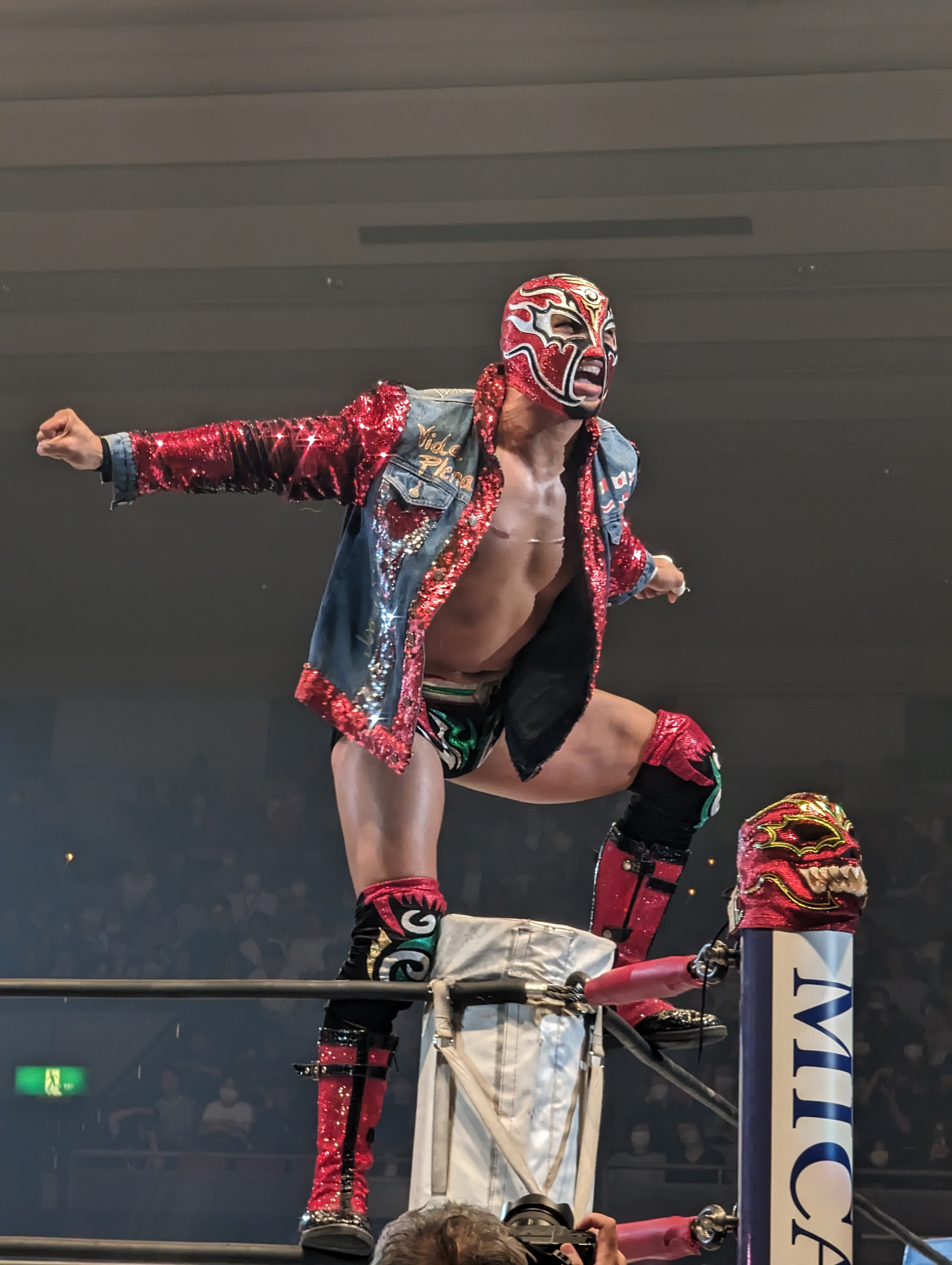
Titán

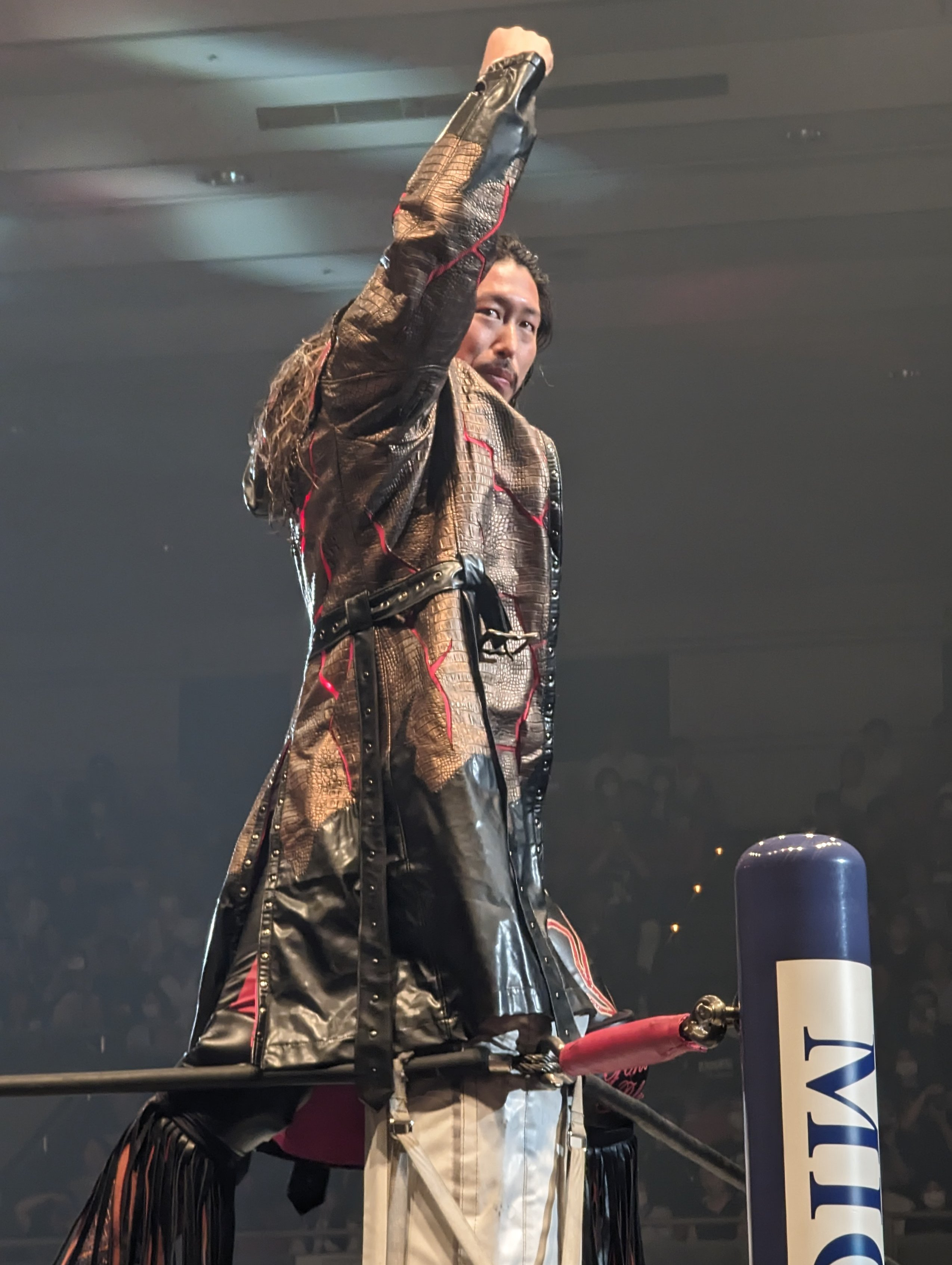
Yota Tsuji

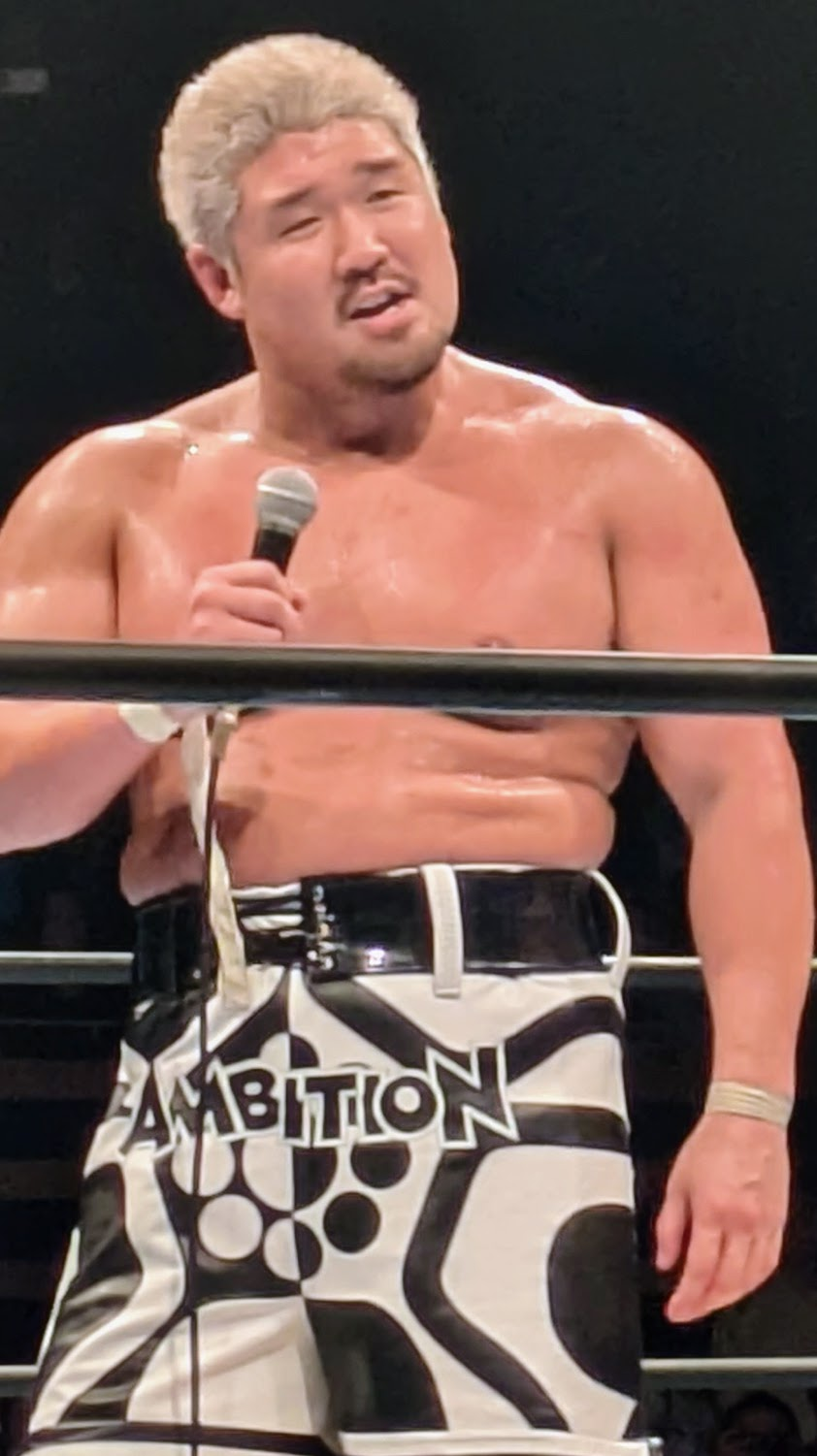
Yuto-Ice

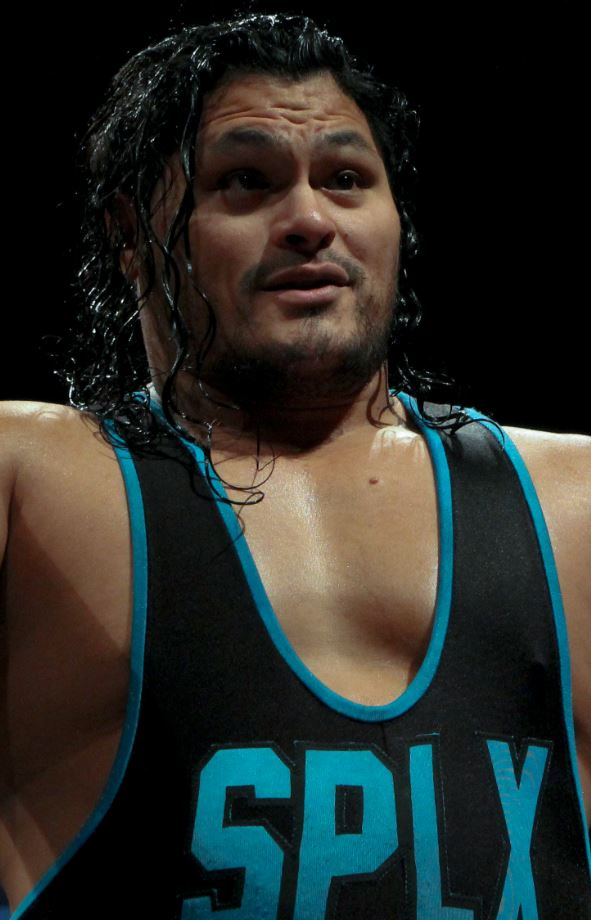
Jeff Cobb

*	Founding member
M	Manager

=== Current ===
Member		Joined
Daiki Nagai	*	January 5, 2026
Drilla Moloney	*	January 5, 2026
Gedo	*M	January 5, 2026
Oskar	*	January 5, 2026
Robbie X	*	January 5, 2026
Shingo Takagi	*	January 5, 2026
Taiji Ishimori	*	January 5, 2026
Titán	*	January 5, 2026
Yota Tsuji	*	January 5, 2026
Yuto-Ice	*	January 5, 2026
Jeff Cobb		August 16, 2026

=== Former ===
Member		Joined	Left
Hiromu Takahashi	*	January 5, 2026	February 11, 2026
David Finlay	*	January 5, 2026	February 27, 2026 (Note: This member never officially left the stable. The date represents their final appearance as a member.)
Clark Connors	*	January 5, 2026	March 4, 2026
Gabe Kidd	*	January 5, 2026	April 4, 2026

== Sub-groups ==
Affiliate	Members	Tenure	Type
Knock Out Brothers (K.O.B)	Oskar; Yuto-Ice	2026–present	Tag team

== Championships and accomplishments ==
- New Japan Pro-Wrestling
  - IWGP Heavyweight Championship (Note: During Tsuji's first reign, the championship was known as the IWGP World Heavyweight Championship, but the name and lineage have since reverted to the IWGP Heavyweight Championship.) (2 times, current) – Tsuji
  - IWGP Intercontinental Championship (1 time, final) (Note: With the reactivation of the IWGP Heavyweight Championship and the restored and combined histories of both it, the World Heavyweight, and the Intercontinental titles, all former IWGP World Heavyweight Champions are retroactively recognized as having been an IWGP Intercontinental Champion.) – Tsuji
  - IWGP Global Heavyweight Championship (1 time) – Tsuji
  - IWGP Tag Team Championship (2 times, current) – Ice and Oskar
  - IWGP Junior Heavyweight Tag Team Championship (1 time) – Ishimori and Robbie
  - NEVER Openweight 6-Man Tag Team Championship (1 time, current) – Ice, Oskar and Cobb
  - Super Jr. Tag League (2026) – with Ishimori and Robbie
  - Strong Openweight Tag Team Championship (1 time, current) – Titán and Ishimori
- Pro Wrestling Illustrated
  - Singles wrestlers
    - Ranked Yota Tsuji No. 7 of the top 500 singles wrestlers in the PWI 500 of 2026.
    - Ranked Drilla Moloney No. 159 of the top 500 singles wrestlers in the PWI 500 of 2026.
    - Ranked Robbie X No. 210 of the top 500 singles wrestlers in the PWI 500 of 2026.
    - Ranked Shingo Takagi No. 103 of the top 500 singles wrestlers in the PWI 500 of 2026.
    - Ranked Taiji Ishimori No. 279 of the top 500 singles wrestlers in the PWI 500 of 2026.
    - Ranked Titán No. 137 of the top 500 singles wrestlers in the PWI 500 of 2026.
