= Ryohei Oiwa =

Japanese professional wrestler (born 1998)

- Oiwa in August 2026

Personal information
- Born: November 7, 1998 (age 27) Kōnan, Aichi, Japan

Professional wrestling career
- Ring name: Ryohei Oiwa
- Billed height: 5 ft 11 in (1.80 m)
- Billed weight: 243 lb (110 kg)
- Trained by: Hiroyoshi Tenzan; Kaito Kiyomiya; NJPW Dojo; Yoshinari Ogawa; Zack Sabre Jr.
- Debut: August 24, 2021

Ryohei Oiwa (大岩 陵平, Ōiwa Ryōhei; born November 7, 1998) is a Japanese professional wrestler. He is signed to New Japan Pro-Wrestling (NJPW), where he is a member of the TMDK stable and the incumbent winner of the G1 Climax. He is also a former NEVER Openweight 6-Man Tag Team Champion.

== Early life ==
Oiwa was born in Kōnan, Aichi, Japan on November 7, 1998. He began amateur wrestling at Zen Total Wrestling Club in his third year of junior high school, and won the bronze medal in the 86 kg freestyle division at the 2018 JOC Junior Olympic Cup.

== Professional wrestling career ==
=== New Japan Pro-Wrestling (2021–present) ===
==== Early career (2021–2023) ====
Oiwa passed New Japan Pro-Wrestling's new apprentice test held in December 2020, and joined the dojo in April 2021 after graduating from Hosei University's Faculty of Law. On August 24, 2021, he made his in-ring debut match against Kosei Fujita, at Korakuen Hall, ending in a 10-minute time limit draw. On April 18, 2022, Oiwa defeated Fujita for his first professional victory. He also defeated fellow young lion Yuto Nakashima on August 20.

At night 2 of Wrestle Kingdom 17, Fujita and Oiwa teamed up to take on Daishi Ozawa and Yasutaka Yano. In the end, Oiwa and Fujita tossed Yano over the ropes, allowing Fujita to lock in a Boston Crab submission, forcing Ozawa to tap out. On August 13, 2023, at the Ryōgoku Kokugikan, Oiwa and Kaito Kiyomiya teamed up to defeat Toru Yano and Oskar Leube in the G1 Climax 33 finals, winning their first match in four attempts. Backstage after the match, Kiyomiya proposed to Oiwa that they join forces in NOAH, to which Oiwa readily accepted. This marked the start of an unusual domestic training program for a Young Lion.

On September 3, 2023, in his first match since graduating from the Young Lions, Oiwa teamed up with Kiyomiya to face Zack Sabre Jr. and Yoshinari Ogawa at the Osaka Prefectural Gymnasium and won the match. Five days later, at the New Japan Pro-Wrestling Korakuen Hall event, he unsuccessfully challenged Sabre Jr. for the NJPW World Television Championship. On November 20, Oiwa and Kiyomiya entered the A block of the World Tag League 2023. They faced Bullet Club's Gabe Kidd and Alex Coughlin, with Kiyomiya winning by ring out. At the Nagoya International Conference Center event on November 28, Oiwa and Kiyomiya faced Shota Umino and Ren Narita in the main event and lost, As a result, WTL ended up with two wins and missed out on advancing to the finals.

==== TMDK (2024–present) ====
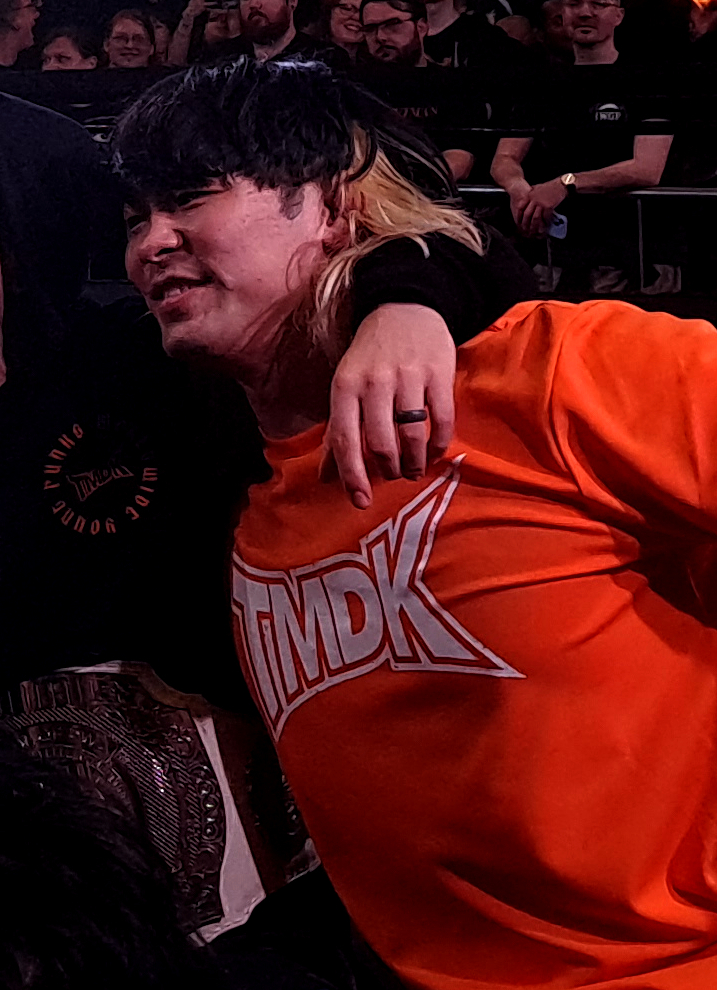
Oiwa in 2024

On September 29, at Destruction in Kobe, Oiwa teamed up with Zack Sabre Jr. and Kosei Fujita, joining TMDK, and defeating Sanada, Taichi, and Taka Michinoku of Just 5 Guys. In March 2025, Oiwa participated in his first New Japan Cup, defeating Chase Owens in the first round, but lost to Sabre Jr.. in the second. On April 4, 2025 at Sakura Genesis, Oiwa unsuccessfully challenged Konosuke Takeshita for the NEVER Openweight Championship. In July to August, Oiwa participated in his first G1 Climax tournament, where he was placed in A-Block. Oiwa scored 8 points in his block and failed to advance to the semi-finals. For the 2025 World Tag League, Oiwa teamed with Sabre Jr., where they were placed in A block and scored 8 points. They were able to advance to the playoff stage, defeating the reigining Bishamon (Hirooki Goto and Yoshi-Hashi) in the semi-finals, and Yota Tsuji and Gabe Kidd in the grand finals, winning the World Tag League and earning an IWGP Tag Team Championship match.

On January 5, 2026 at Wrestle Kingdom 20, Oiwa, Sabre, and Hartley Jackson won a Ranbo to win the NEVER Openweight 6-Man Tag Team Championship, marking Oiwa's first title in his career. The following night at New Year Dash!!, Oiwa and Sabre unsuccessfully challenged Knock Out Brothers (Oskar and Yuto-Ice) for the IWGP Tag Team Championship. On January 19, TMDK lost their titles to Bishamon-tin (Boltin Oleg, Hirooki Goto and Yoshi-Hashi). In March 2026, Oiwa competed in the New Japan Cup, eliminating Yuto-Ice in the first round before being eliminated by Sabre again in the second round. On April 4 at Sakura Genesis, Oiwa and Sabre once again failed to defeat Knock Out Brothers for the IWGP Tag Team Championship. From July 11 till August 16, Oiwa participated in G1 Climax 36 (A block) and finished with 12 points (6–3) to qualify for the semis; he went on to defeat Callum Newman in the semifinals before defeating Yuya Uemura in the final to capture the G1 Climax for the first time in his career. Oiwa chose to invoke his guaranteed IWGP Heavyweight Championship match from winning the tournament at King of Pro-Wrestling on October 12, where he failed to win the title from Yota Tsuji.

=== Pro Wrestling Noah (2023–2024) ===
Oiwa made his Pro Wrestling Noah debut on September 3, 2023. This was seen as an unusual decision as most NJPW Young Lions choose to have learning excursions overseas rather than domestically. Oiwa and Kaito Kiyomiya entered the Victory Challenge Tag League, held on February 24, 2024. They advanced to the finals with a record of 4 wins, 2 losses and 1 draw, defeating the team of Saxon Huxley and Timothy Thatcher to win the tournament. After that, they challenged for the GHC Tag Team Championship, but lost to Jack Morris and Anthony Greene and failed to win the title. On May 7, Kiyomiya formed a new unit, "All Rebellion," with Kenoh and others. On May 21, just as it seemed that Oiwa would follow suit, he suddenly attacked Kiyomiya and Kenoh, thus refusing to join All Rebellion. On September 14 at Noah Star Navigation in Tokyo 2024, Oiwa was defeated by Kiyomiya in his final match in his learning excursion. After returning to NJPW, Oiwa made a one night appearance for Noah at Wrestle Magic on June 30, 2025, teaming with Kiyomiya, Yuki Ueno, and Yuki Yoshioka defeat Akito, Daiki Inaba, KAI, and YOSHI-HASHI.

== Championships and accomplishments ==
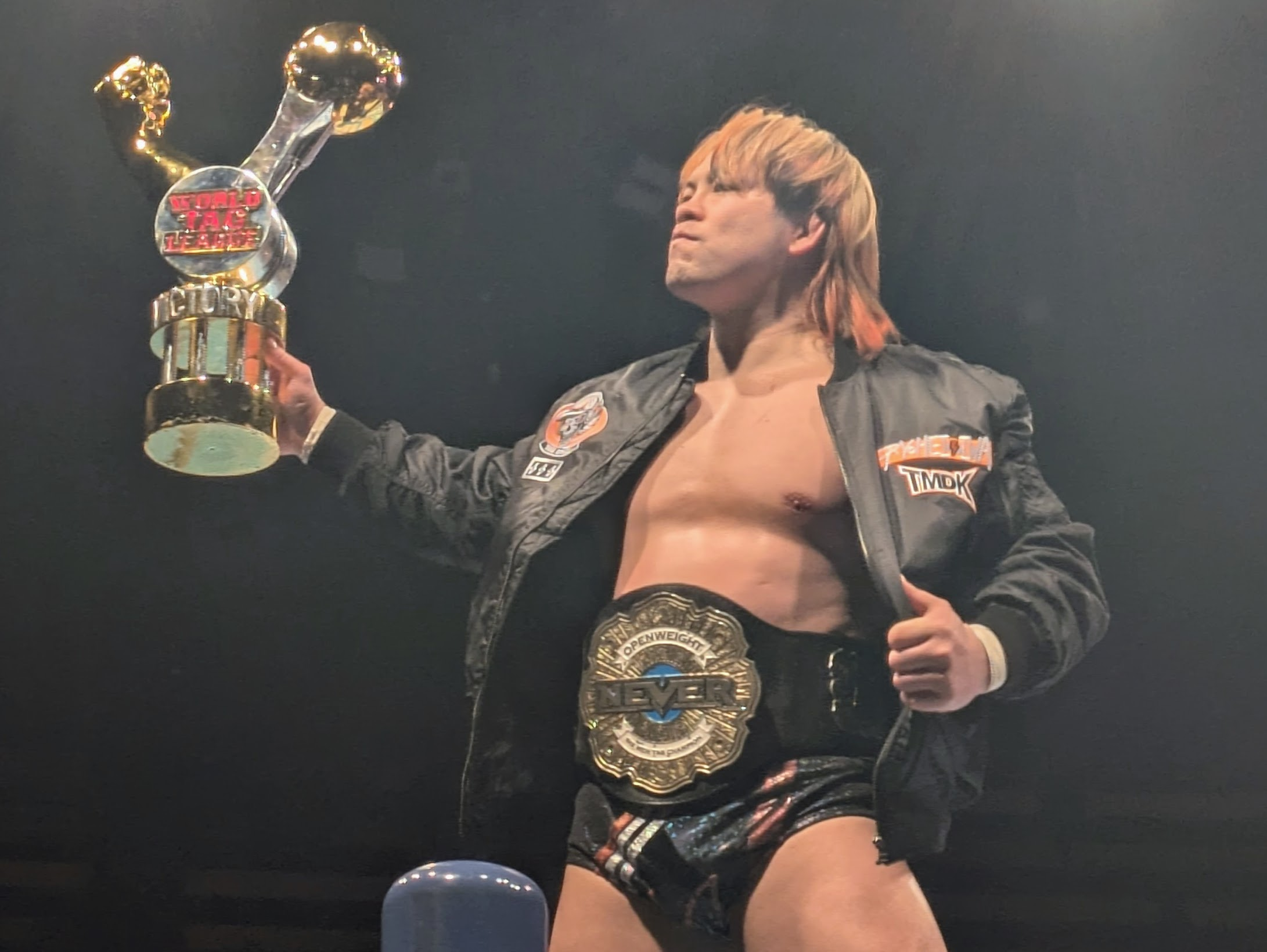
Oiwa is a one-time NEVER Openweight 6-Man Tag Team Champion, the winner the 2025 World Tag League...

...and the winner of the 2026 G1 Climax.

- New Japan Pro-Wrestling
  - NEVER Openweight 6-Man Tag Team Championship (1 time) – with Zack Sabre Jr. and Hartley Jackson
  - G1 Climax (2026)
  - G1 Climax Awards (1 time)
    - Technique Award (2026)
  - World Tag League (2025) – with Zack Sabre Jr.
- Pro Wrestling Illustrated
  - Ranked No. 182 of the top singles wrestlers in the PWI 500 in 2026
- Pro Wrestling Noah
  - Victory Challenge Tag League (2024) – with Kaito Kiyomiya
