= Yuto-Ice =

Japanese professional wrestler (born 1997)

- Yuto-Ice in 2026

Personal information
- Born: Yuto Nakashima; January 7, 1997 (age 29) Ōgaki, Gifu, Japan

Professional wrestling career
- Ring names: Yuto Nakashima; Yuto-Ice
- Billed height: 1.80 m (5 ft 11 in)
- Billed weight: 105 kg (231 lb)
- Billed from: Ōgaki, Gifu, Japan
- Trained by: Bad Luck Fale; NJPW Dojo; Hiroshi Tanahashi
- Debut: February 14, 2021

Yuto Nakashima (中島佑斗, Nakashima Yūto; born January 7, 1997) is a Japanese professional wrestler. He is signed to New Japan Pro-Wrestling (NJPW), where he performs under the ring name Yuto-Ice. He is a member of the Unbound Co. stable and is one-half of the Knock Out Brothers with stablemate Oskar. With Oskar, he is one-half of the current IWGP Tag Team Champions in their second reign as a team, and also one-third of the NEVER Openweight 6-Man Tag Team Champions with Oskar and Jeff Cobb.

Known for his martial arts background, he has competed internationally, including notable appearances in Revolution Pro Wrestling (RevPro) and Westside Xtreme Wrestling (wXw).

== Early life ==
Nakashima was born in Ōgaki, Gifu Prefecture, Japan. He trained in judo from a young age, achieving black belt status before transitioning to mixed martial arts and then professional wrestling.

== Professional wrestling career ==
=== New Japan Pro-Wrestling (2021–present) ===
==== Young Lion and foreign excursion (2021–2025) ====
Nakashima made his debut for NJPW on February 14, 2021, during the Road to Castle Attack event, facing Yuya Uemura. However, the match was stopped after Nakashima dislocated his elbow. Following his recovery, Nakashima participated in NJPW's Young Lion matches, frequently competing against wrestlers like Ryohei Oiwa and Kosei Fujita. He achieved his first victory on April 20, 2022, defeating Oiwa. In 2023, Nakashima formed a tag team with Oskar Leube, known as "Young Blood".

In January 2024 at New Year Dash!!, Young Blood wrestled their final match as young lions before embarking on learning excursion (as is customary for NJPW Young Lions), losing to El Phantasmo and Hikuleo.

==== Knock Out Brothers (2025–present) ====
On the final night of G1 Climax 35 on August 17, 2025, Bullet Club War Dogs leader David Finlay introduced Nakashima (now known as Yuto-Ice) and Leube (now known as Oskar) as the newest members of Bullet Club War Dogs as they attacked Satoshi Kojima, Taichi and Katsuya Murashima. Yuto and Oskar also changed their tag team name to "Knock Out Brothers". At Destruction in Kobe, Yuto and Oskar defeated Taichi and Tomohiro Ishii to win the IWGP Tag Team Championship, marking their first championship in NJPW.

After Wrestle Kingdom 20, at New Year Dash!!, David Finlay and Yota Tsuji announced the dissolution of Bullet Club and Mushozoku, replacing the alliance with Unbound Co., which was a complete merger, also in the main event of the show Knock Out Brothers defeated Ryohei Oiwa and Zack Sabre Jr. to retain their tag titles. Over the following months, Knock Out Brothers would sucussefully defened their titles against various teams such as RoughStorm, TMDK, and Bishamon. On June 14 at Dominion 6.14 in Osaka-jo Hall, Knock Out Brothers lost the titles to United Empire's Great-O-Khan and Henare, ending their reign at 259 days. On June 23, Yuto defeated Taichi to qualify for the A-Block in his first G1 Climax tournament. From July to August, Yuto finished with 8 points and failed to advance to the semi-finals. Knock Out Brothers regained the IWGP Tag Team Championship from O-Khan and Henare on October 6 during the Road to King of Pro-Wrestling tour. On October 12 at King of Pro-Wrestling, Yuto-Ice, Oskar and Jeff Cobb defeated Will Ospreay, Henare, and O-Khan to win the NEVER Openweight Six-Man Tag Team Championship

=== European independent circuit (2024–2025) ===
In early 2024, Nakashima embarked on an excursion to Europe, wrestling for the likes of Revolution Pro Wrestling (RevPro) and Westside Xtreme Wrestling (wXw). At RevPro’s High Stakes 2024 event, Young Blood defeated Kieron Lacey and Mark Trew in a tag team match. Young Blood also participated in a tag team match to defeat David Francisco and Goldenboy Santos in a street fight at a subsequent RevPro event. In wXw, Young Blood won the wXw World Tag Team Championship at the World Tag Team Festival in October 2024, defeating KXS (Axel Tischer and Fast Time Moodo) in the finals. In March 2025, they lost the titles to Big Bucks (Alex Duke and Norman Harras), ending their reign at 152 days.

== Professional wrestling style and persona ==
Nakashima’s background in judo and MMA has heavily influenced his wrestling style. His in-ring persona is often described as stoic and disciplined, focusing on technical grappling. His wrestling persona is characterized by his brash attitude, street-inspired charisma, and aggressive in-ring style.

== Championships and accomplishments ==
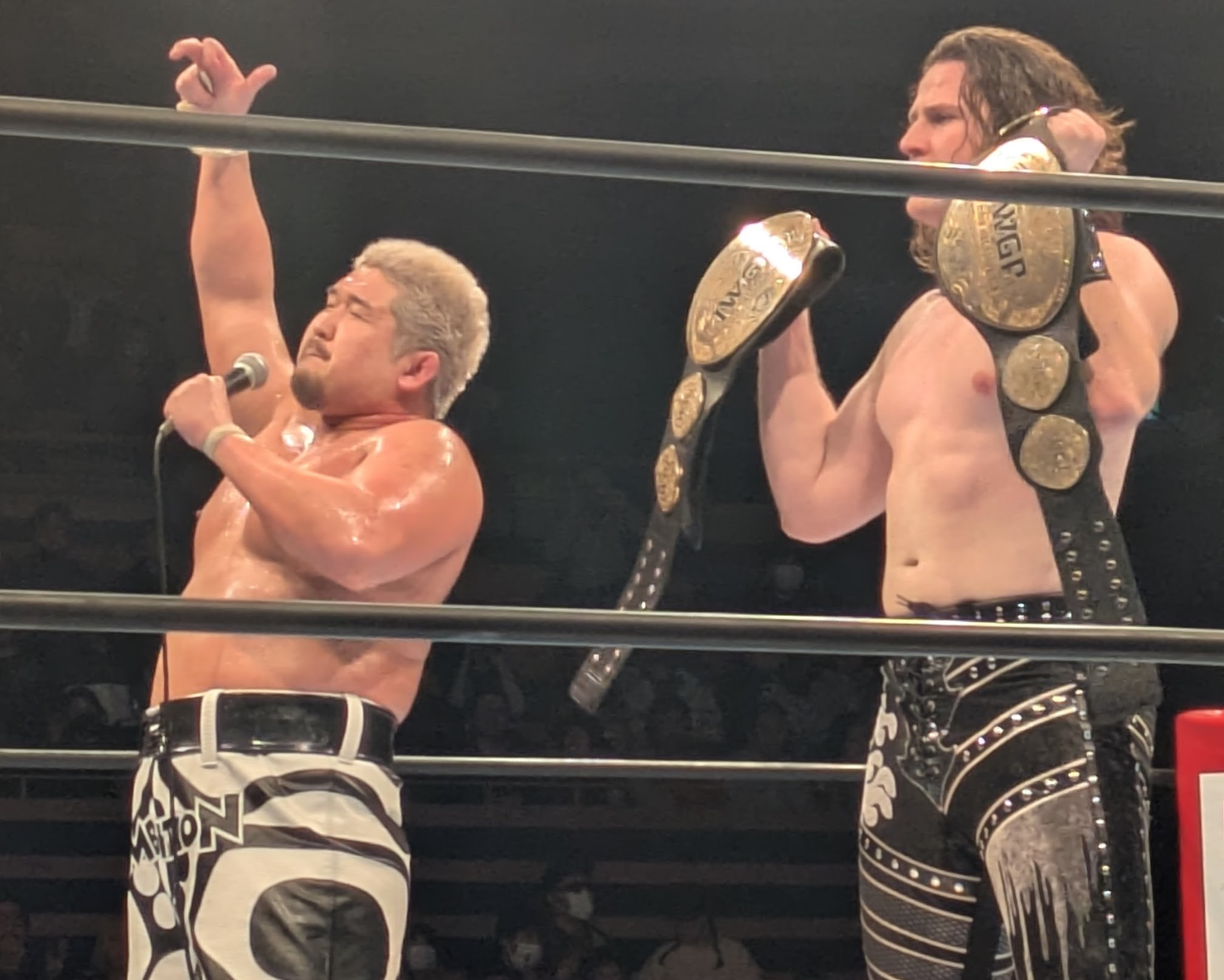
Yuto-Ice and Oskar as the IWGP Tag Team Champions in January 2026

- New Japan Pro-Wrestling
  - IWGP Tag Team Championship (2 times, current) – with Oskar
  - NEVER Openweight 6-Man Tag Team Championship (1 time, current) – with Oskar and Jeff Cobb
  - G1 Climax Awards (1 time)
    - Fighting Spirit Award (2026)
- Pro Wrestling Holland
  - PWH Tag Team Championship (1 time) – with Oskar Leube
- Westside Xtreme Wrestling
  - wXw World Tag Team Championship (1 time) – with Oskar Leube
  - wXw World Tag Team Festival (2024) — with Oskar Leube
- Tokyo Sports
  - Best Tag Team Award (2025) - with Oskar
