= Oskar (wrestler) =

German professional wrestler (born 1998)

- Leube in 2026

Personal information
- Born: Oskar Münchow; 14 July 1998 (age 28) Hamburg, Germany

Professional wrestling career
- Ring name(s): Oskar; Oskar Leube; Oskar Münchow
- Billed height: 201 cm (6 ft 7 in)
- Billed weight: 115 kg (254 lb)
- Trained by: Nordisch Fight Club; Karsten Kretschmer; Fale Dojo; Bad Luck Fale; Tony Kozina; NJPW Dojo
- Debut: March 3, 2019

Oskar Münchow (born 14 July 1998) is a German professional wrestler. He is signed to New Japan Pro-Wrestling (NJPW), where he performs mononymously as Oskar (stylized in all caps and shortened from his previous ring name Oskar Leube) and is a member of Unbound Co.. He is one-half of the IWGP Tag Team Champions with fellow stablemate Yuto-Ice as the Knock Out Brothers, and is also one-third of the NEVER Openweight 6-Man Tag Team Champions with Yuto-Ice and Jeff Cobb.

== Professional wrestling career ==
=== Early career (2019–2022) ===
In January 2019, Münchow began training at the Fale Dojo in New Zealand. It was also around that time, he would befriend his future tag partner in Yuto Nakashima who was also training in the dojo. Two months later, on 3 March, Münchow had his debut professional wrestling match. Beginning of January 2020, he trained in the NJPW Dojo for the first time before returning to Germany. In November 2021, Münchow began to compete in Westside Xtreme Wrestling (wXw) under the ring name Oskar. On November 13, in his wXw debut, Oskar defeated Norman Harras by pinfall. On 5 March 2022, at wXwNOW & Friends, he won the wXw Academy Trophy Championship defeating Goldenboy Santos.

=== New Japan Pro-Wrestling (2022–present) ===
==== Young Lion and European excursions (2022–2025) ====
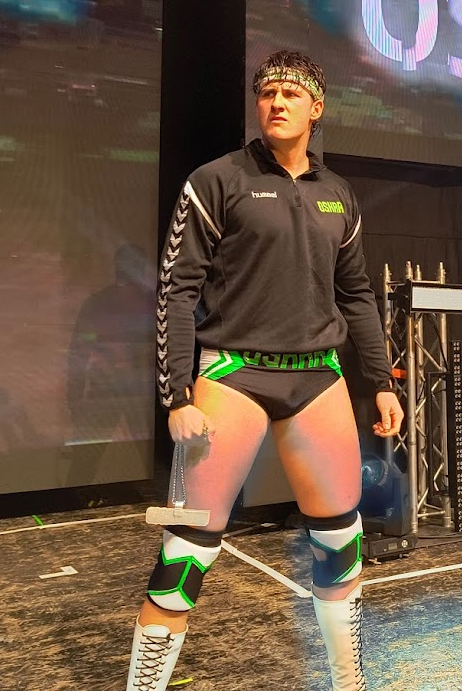
Oskar Leube in 2024

On 20 November 2022, at Historic X-Over, Münchow made his NJPW debut under the ring name Oskar Leube. At the event, Leube, Kosei Fujita, Nakashima, Ryohei Oiwa lost to Alex Coughlin, Clark Connors, Gabriel Kidd and Kevin Knight. Three days later, at night two of the Super Junior Tag League, Leube had his first win in NJPW when he teamed up with Fujita to defeat Oiwa and Nakashima. Throughout 2023, Leube would continue to wrestle primary in the undercard and opening matches as a Young Lion as he gained experience, and during that time, he and Nakashima would regularly team up, and soon the duo would go by the tag team name Young Blood. At New Year's Dash 2024, he had his final match as a Young Lion in New Japan where he and Nakashima lost to then IWGP Tag Team Champions and Strong Openweight Tag Champions in Hikuleo and El Phantasmo, as it was announced he was going on excursion together with Nakashima. The two would go to Europe where they would begin competing in promotions such as RevPro Wrestling and Oskar's old home promotion in wXw.

==== Knock Out Brothers (2025–present) ====
On the final night of G1 Climax 35 on August 17, 2025, Bullet Club War Dogs leader David Finlay introduced Leube (now performing as Oskar) and Nakashima (now known as Yuto-Ice) as the newest members of Bullet Club as they attacked Satoshi Kojima, Taichi and Katsuya Murashima. Oskar and Yuto also changed their tag team name to "Knock Out Brothers". At Destruction in Kobe, Oskar and Yuto defeated Taichi and Tomohiro Ishii to win the IWGP Tag Team Championship, marking their first championship in NJPW.

After Wrestle Kingdom 20, at New Year Dash!!, David Finlay and Yota Tsuji announced the dissolution of Bullet Club and Mushozoku, replacing the alliance with Unbound Company, which was a complete merger. Knock Out Brothers would successfully defend their titles against various teams such as RoughStorm, TMDK, and Bishamon. On June 14 at Dominion 6.14 in Osaka-jo Hall, Knock Out Brothers lost the titles to United Empire's Great-O-Khan and Henare, ending their reign at 259 days. On July 6, Oskar defeated Yujiro Takahashi to qualify for the G1 Climax as part of B-Block, his first time competiting in the tournament. Oskar finished the tournament with 8 points and failed to advance to the semi-finals. Knock Out Brothers regained the IWGP Tag Team Championship from O-Khan and Henare on October 6 during the Road to King of Pro-Wrestling tour. On October 12 at King of Pro-Wrestling, Knock Out Brothers teamed with stablemate Jeff Cobb to defeat O-Khan, Henare, and Will Ospreay to win the NEVER Openweight Six-Man Tag Team Championship, becoming a double champion.

=== European independent circuit (2024–2025) ===
At RevPro’s High Stakes 2024 event, Leube and Nakashima defeated Kieron Lacey and Mark Trew in a tag team match. They also participated in a tag team match to defeat David Francisco and Goldenboy Santos in a street fight at a subsequent RevPro event. In wXw, Nakashima and Leube won the wXw World Tag Team Championship at the World Tag Team Festival in October 2024, defeating KXS (Axel Tischer and Fast Time Moodo) in the finals. In March 2025, they lost the titles to Big Bucks (Alex Duke and Norman Harras), ending their reign at 152 days.

== Championships and accomplishments ==
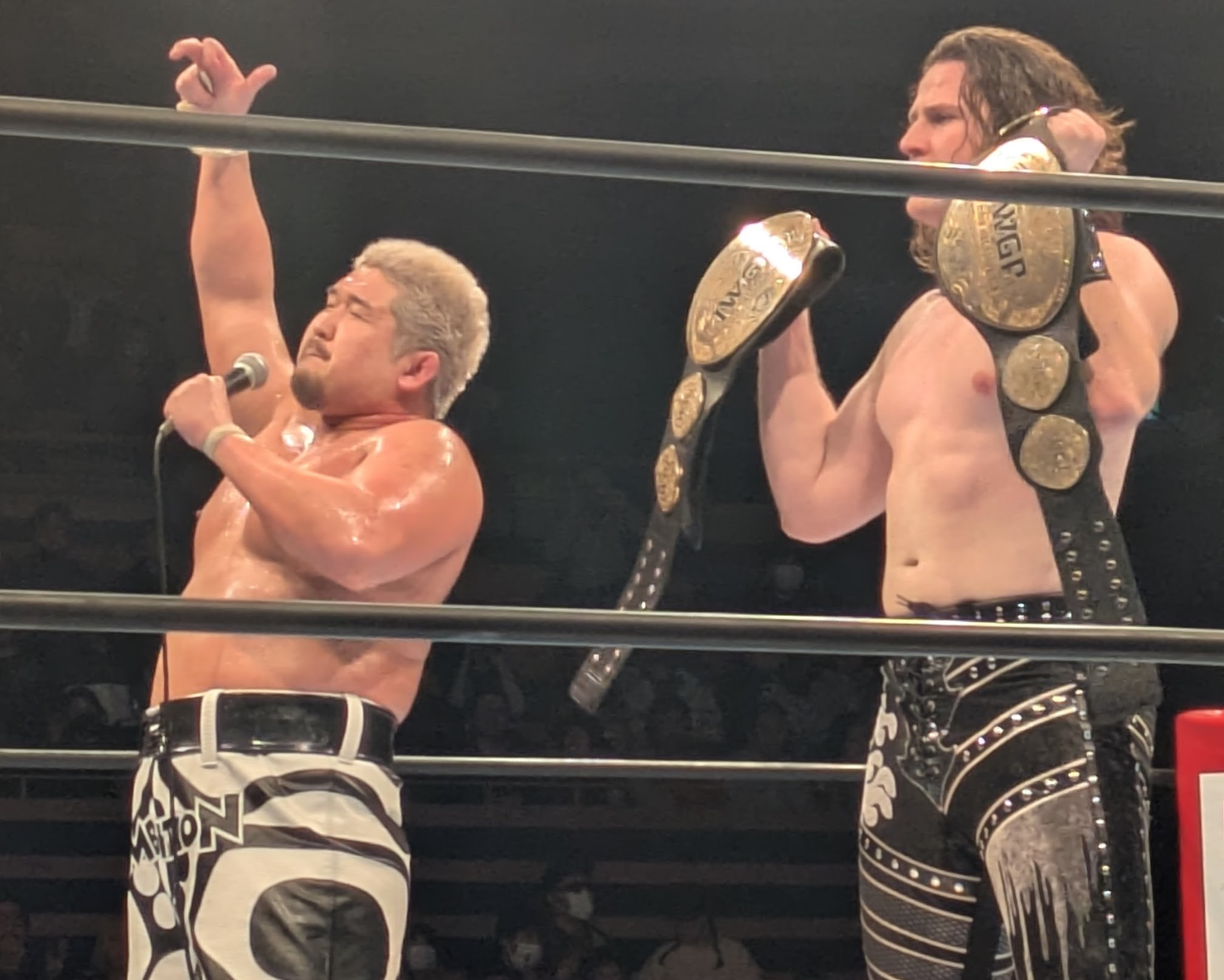
Leube and Yuto-Ice as the IWGP Tag Team Champions in January 2026

- New Japan Pro-Wrestling
  - IWGP Tag Team Championship (2 times, current) – with Yuto-Ice
  - NEVER Openweight 6-Man Tag Team Championship (1 time, current) – with Yuto-Ice and Jeff Cobb
- Pro Wrestling Holland
  - PWH Tag Team Championship (1 time) – with Yuto-Ice
- Westside Xtreme Wrestling
  - wXw Academy Trophy Championship (1 time)
  - wXw World Tag Team Championship (1 time) – with Yuto Nakashima
  - wXw World Tag Team Festival (2024) – with Yuto Nakashima
- Tokyo Sports
  - Best Tag Team Award (2025) - with Yuto-Ice
