= Kosei Fujita =

Japanese professional wrestler (born 2002)

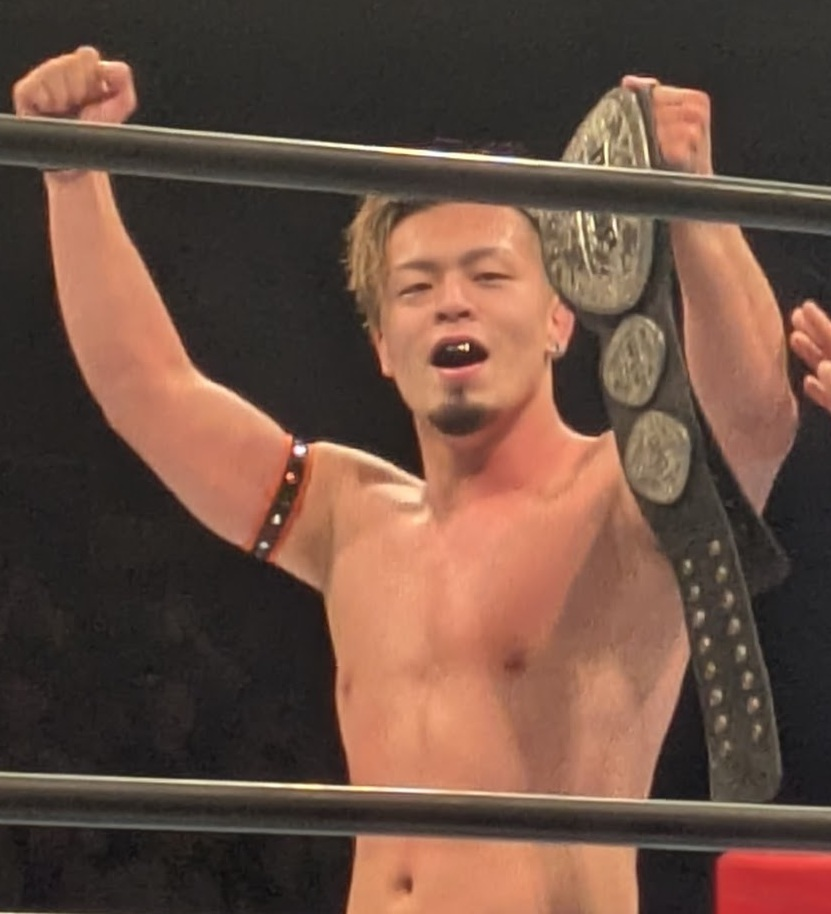
- Fujita in January 2026

Personal information
- Born: July 14, 2002 (age 24) Niihama, Ehime, Japan

Professional wrestling career
- Ring name: Kosei Fujita
- Billed height: 5 ft 10 in (1.78 m)
- Billed weight: 187 lb (85 kg)
- Trained by: NJPW Dojo; Togi Makabe; Yuji Nagata; Zack Sabre Jr.
- Debut: August 24, 2021

Kosei Fujita (Japanese: 藤田 晃生, Fujita Kosei; born July 14, 2002) is a Japanese professional wrestler. He is signed to New Japan Pro-Wrestling (NJPW), where he is a member of The Mighty Don't Kneel stable. He is a three-time IWGP Junior Heavyweight Tag Team Champion and the winner of the 32nd Best of the Super Juniors tournament.

== Early life ==
Fujita was born in Niihama, Ehime, Japan on July 14, 2002. He competed in amateur wrestling in high school, and in 2019, he won the JOC Chugoku/Shikoku Championship 80 kg class.

== Professional wrestling career ==
=== New Japan Pro-Wrestling (2021–present) ===
==== Young Lion (2021–2022) ====
Fujita passed the new apprentice test in December 2020. He entered the NJPW Dojo in April 2021.

On August 24, 2021, Kosei made his in-ring debut match against Ryohei Oiwa, at Korakuen Hall, ending in a 10-minute time limit draw. At the Korakuen Hall 60th Anniversary 60th Birthday Festival held at Korakuen Hall on April 16, 2022, he defeated Ryo Inoue of All Japan Pro Wrestling in the first match, thus winning his first singles match. On August 10, 2022, he appeared as a double of Zack Sabre Jr. who was in Suzuki-gun at the G1 CLIMAX 32 Hiroshima tournament. On October 2, at AJPW Raising An Army Memorial Series, Fujita, Yuji Nagata, Yuto Nakashima, and Oiwa fought against Kento Miyahara, Inoue, Yuma Anzai, and Takuya Nomura of Big Japan Pro-Wrestling, in an eight-man tag team match where the former won the match. On November 5, he became Sabre's body double with Ryohei Oiwa and assisted in the victory.

==== TMDK (2023–present) ====
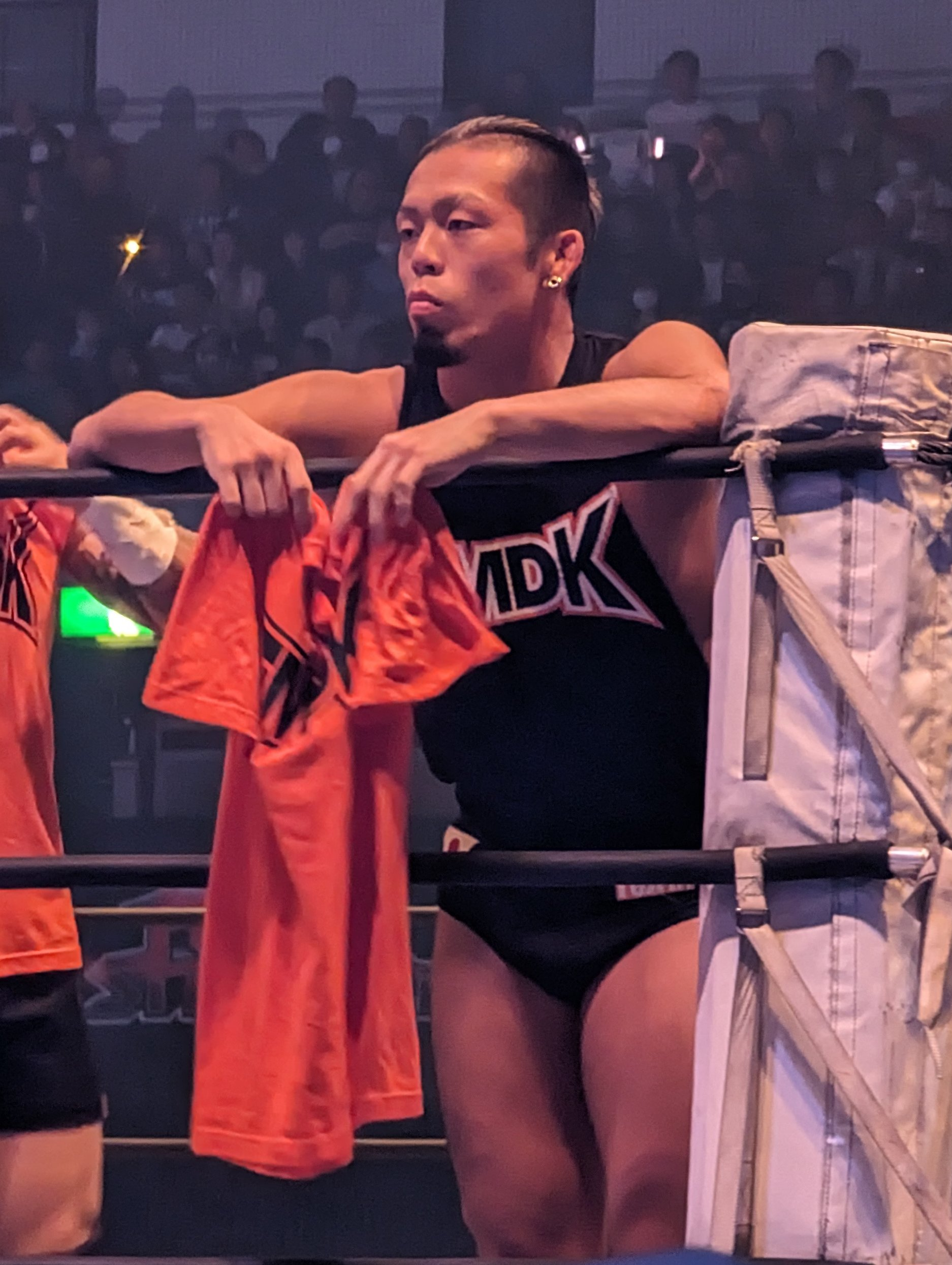
Fujita in November 2023

On January 5, 2023, at New Year Dash!!, Fujita accepted an offer from Sabre to join TMDK. On August 13, he declared that he graduated from the Young Lions. On November 4, 2024, at Power Struggle, Fujita and Robbie Eagles as the "Ichiban Sweet Boys", won the Super Junior Tag League.

On January 4, 2025, at Wrestle Kingdom 19, the Ichiban Sweet Boys won the IWGP Junior Heavyweight Tag Team Championship, marking Fujita's first title in his career. On April 29, 2025 at Wrestling Hizen no Kuni, Ichiban Sweetboys lost their titles to YOH and Master Wato. On June 1, 2025, Fujita defeated YOH to win 32nd Best of the Super Juniors tournament, becoming the youngest to ever do so. On July 6 at New Japan Soul, Fujita failed to defeat El Desperado for the IWGP Junior Heavyweight Championship.

On January 5, 2026 at New Year Dash!!. Ichiban Sweet Boys won the IWGP Junior Heavyweight Tag Team Championship for the second time in a four-way tag, but lost them two months later to Robbie X and Taiji Ishimori of Unbound Co.. They regained the titles on April 25 at Wrestling RedZone, but lost it again nine days later to El Desperado and Místico at Wrestling Dontaku. In the following months, Fujita would make to the finals of both the Best of the Super Juniors and Super Junior Tag League as well as challenging Aaron Wolf for the NEVER Openweight Championship, but would lose in all three matches.

=== Other promotions (2022–present) ===
Due to NJPW's working relationships, Fujita has made appearances for other promotions such as All Japan Pro Wrestling (AJPW), Major League Wrestling (MLW), and Ring of Honor (ROH).

Fujita made his debut for AJPW on July 9, 2022, teaming with Tiger Mask to defeat Dan Tamura and Ryo Inoue. Fujita made his ROH debut on December 15, 2023 at Final Battle, teaming with his TMDK stablemates with Bad Dude Tito and Shane Haste to unsuccessfully challenge Mogul Embassy (Bishop Kaun, Brian Cage, and Toa Liona) for the ROH World Six-Man Tag Team Championship. On March 29, at MLW's War Chamber, Fujita usuccessfully challenged Matt Riddle for the NJPW World Television Championship.

== Championships and accomplishments ==
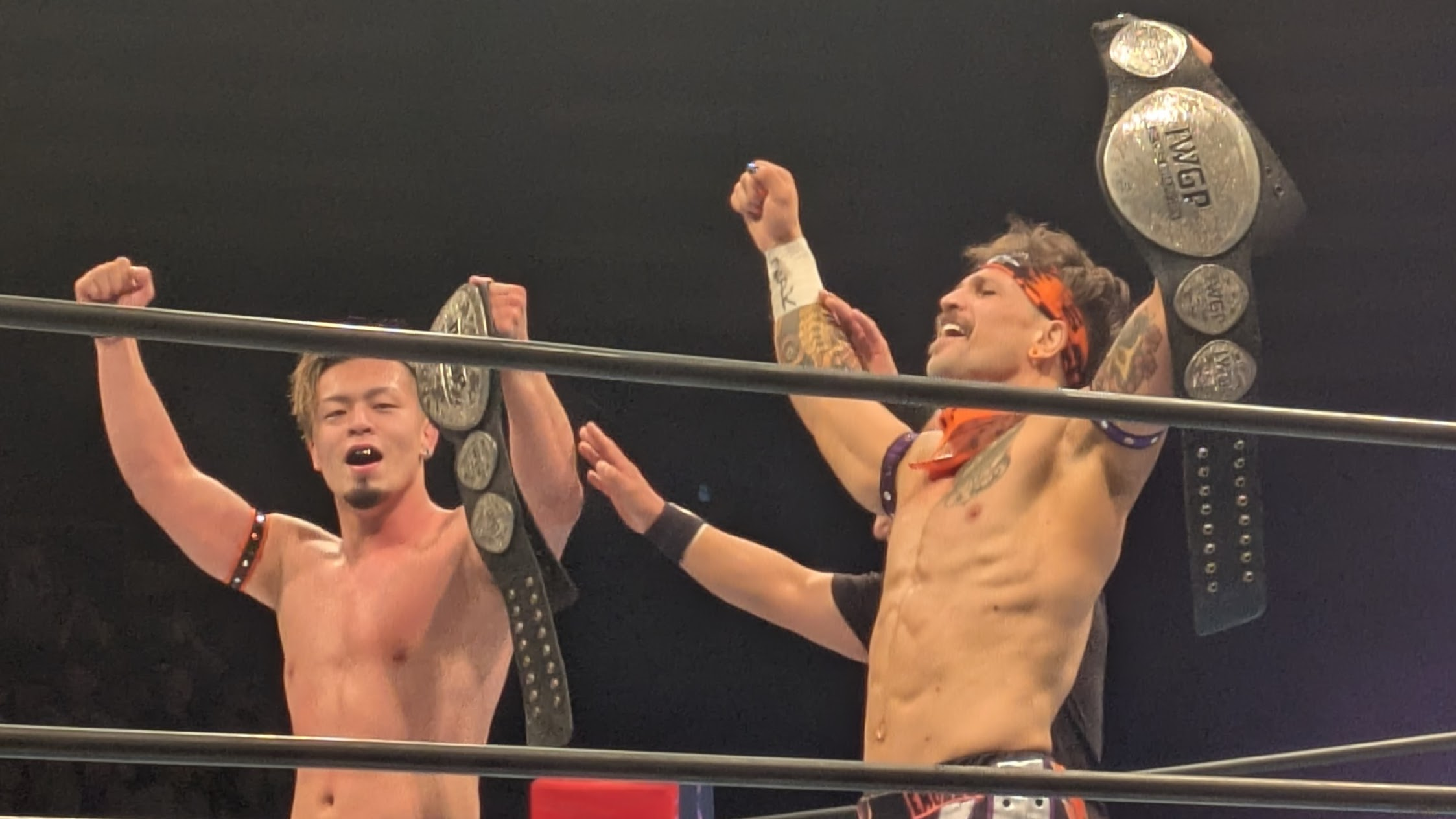
Fujita and Robbie Eagles are three-time IWGP Junior Heavyweight Tag Team Champions

- New Japan Pro-Wrestling
  - IWGP Junior Heavyweight Tag Team Championship (3 times) – with Robbie Eagles
  - Best of the Super Juniors (2025)
  - Super Junior Tag League (2024) – with Robbie Eagles
- Pro Wrestling Illustrated
  - Ranked No. 70 of the top 500 singles wrestlers in the PWI 500 in 2025
