= King of Pro-Wrestling (2017) =

- Promotional poster for the event, featuring Kazuchika Okada, Hiroshi Tanahashi, Tetsuya Naito and Kenny Omega
- Promotion: New Japan Pro-Wrestling
- Date: October 9, 2017
- City: Tokyo, Japan
- Venue: Ryōgoku Kokugikan
- Attendance: 9,234

Event chronology
← Previous; New Japan Road: Ganbarou! Uonuma	Next → Lion's Gate Project 8

King of Pro-Wrestling chronology
← Previous; 2016	Next → 2018

New Japan Pro-Wrestling events chronology
← Previous; Destruction	Next → Global Wars 2017

King of Pro-Wrestling (2017) was a professional wrestling event promoted by New Japan Pro-Wrestling (NJPW), which took place on October 9, 2017, in Tokyo at Ryōgoku Kokugikan. This was the sixth event under the King of Pro-Wrestling branding.

The top two matches featured Kazuchika Okada defending the IWGP Heavyweight Championship against Evil and Tetsuya Naito defending his status as the number one contender to the IWGP Heavyweight Championship at Wrestle Kingdom 12 against Tomohiro Ishii.

== Production ==
=== Background ===
King of Pro-Wrestling is considered NJPW's biggest event between August's G1 Climax and the January 4 Tokyo Dome Show.

=== Storylines ===
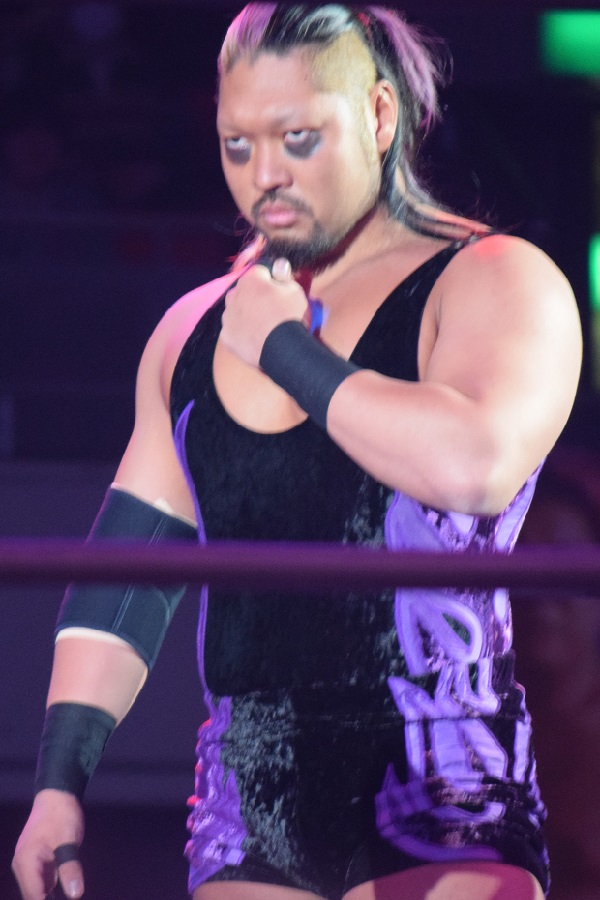
Evil, the number one contender to the IWGP Heavyweight Championship heading into King of Pro-Wrestling

King of Pro-Wrestling featured nine professional wrestling matches that involved different wrestlers from pre-existing scripted feuds and storylines. Wrestlers portrayed villains, heroes, or less distinguishable characters in the scripted events that built tension and culminated in a wrestling match or series of matches.

King of Pro-Wrestling was main evented by Kazuchika Okada defending the IWGP Heavyweight Championship against Evil. In July, Okada, having at that point held the IWGP Heavyweight Championship for over a year, entered the 2017 G1 Climax with the goal of winning the tournament as the reigning heavyweight champion, arrogantly asking for anyone to stop him. On August 5, Okada suffered his first singles match loss in almost a year, when Evil scored an upset win over him. Okada then went on to wrestle Minoru Suzuki to a draw, before losing another match to Kenny Omega, thus failing to advance to the finals of the tournament. With Evil also failing to reach the finals, he established himself as the next challenger for Okada's title by attacking him after a match on August 13. Eight days later, NJPW officially announced the match between Okada and Evil for King of Pro-Wrestling. The match would mark Evil's first-ever shot at the IWGP Heavyweight Championship. The match would mark the eighth title defense for Okada, whose reign had started on June 19, 2016. With a successful title defense, Okada stood to break Shinya Hashimoto's 489-day record for the longest reign as IWGP Heavyweight Champion on October 22.

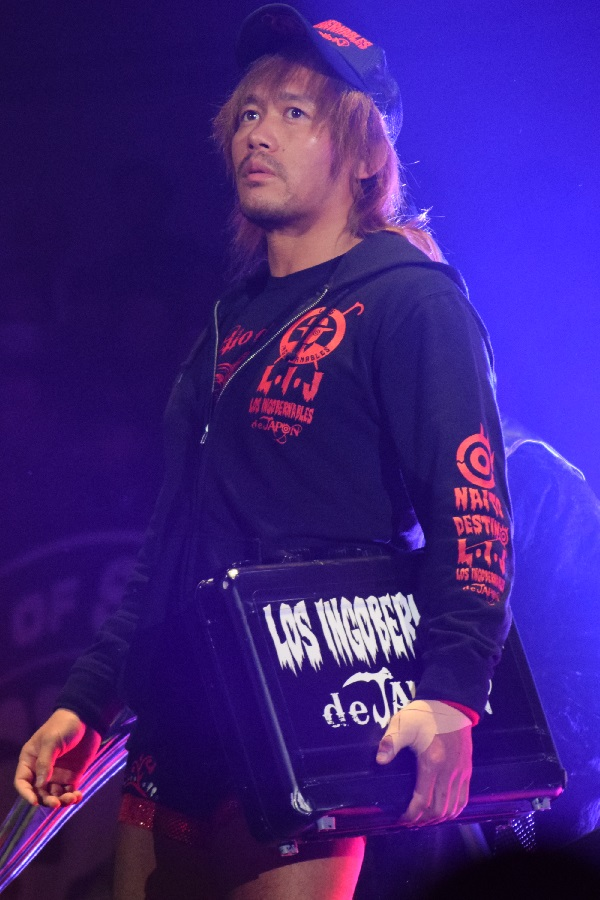
Tetsuya Naito carrying the briefcase containing the Tokyo Dome IWGP Heavyweight Championship challenge rights certificate

On August 13, Tetsuya Naito defeated Kenny Omega in the finals to win the 2017 G1 Climax. Following the win, Naito gained possession of the Tokyo Dome IWGP Heavyweight Championship challenge rights certificate, granting him an IWGP Heavyweight Championship match at NJPW's biggest event of the year, Wrestle Kingdom 12 in Tokyo Dome on January 4, 2018. Upon receiving the certificate, Naito nominated Tomohiro Ishii as his first challenger for it due to Ishii defeating him not only during the 2017 G1 Climax, but also during the IWGP United States Heavyweight Championship tournament in July. The match was officially announced for King of Pro-Wrestling on August 21.

The rest of the matches for the show were announced on September 25, the day after Destruction in Kobe. Added were title matches for both of NJPW's junior heavyweight titles. In the IWGP Junior Heavyweight Championship match, Kushida would defend the title against Will Ospreay. After successfully defending the title against El Desperado on September 16 at Destruction in Hiroshima, Kushida was approached by Ospreay, who stated that he was being defined as the man who could not beat Kushida and wanting to change that perception, challenged him to a title match. This was followed by Hiromu Takahashi entering the ring, but before he could make his own challenge, he was knocked out by Ospreay. Ospreay had been defeated by Kushida in all four of their previous matches against each other, including the finals of the 2017 Best of the Super Juniors and What Culture Pro Wrestling's 2017 Pro Wrestling World Cup tournaments, as well as two IWGP Junior Heavyweight Championship matches, which took place on April 10, 2016, at Invasion Attack 2016 and June 19, 2016, at Dominion 6.19 in Osaka-jo Hall. In the IWGP Junior Heavyweight Tag Team Championship match, Funky Future (Ricochet and Ryusuke Taguchi) were set to defend the title against the mystery team known only as "Roppongi 3K". After dissolving his Roppongi Vice tag team with Beretta on September 16, Rocky Romero approached Ricochet and Taguchi after they had successfully defended the IWGP Junior Heavyweight Tag Team Championship against Taichi and Yoshinobu Kanemaru and announced he was bringing in a new team to challenge them for the title. Heading into the title match, the identities of Roppongi 3K were kept secret.

The IWGP Tag Team Championship was to be defended in a three-way tornado elimination match, where the defending champions Killer Elite Squad (Davey Boy Smith Jr. and Lance Archer) would face the Guerrillas of Destiny (Tama Tonga and Tanga Loa) and War Machine (Hanson and Raymond Rowe). The three teams faced off in three separate three-way title matches during the previous Destruction tour; the first two matches were won by the defending champions War Machine, while the third match was won by the Killer Elite Squad, who captured the IWGP Tag Team Championship for the first time in three years and eight months. Following the conclusion of the third match, both Guerrillas of Destiny and War Machine challenged Killer Elite Squad to another three-way match, which would this time be contested under elimination rules.

== Results ==
No.	Results	Stipulations	Times
1	Los Ingobernables de Japón (Bushi, Hiromu Takahashi and Sanada) defeated Bullet Club (Bad Luck Fale, Leo Tonga and Yujiro Takahashi) (with Pieter and Raby)	Six-man tag team match	06:44
2	Chaos (Hirooki Goto and Toru Yano) defeated Suzuki-gun (Minoru Suzuki and Zack Sabre Jr.) (with El Desperado and Taka Michinoku) by Count Out	Tag team match	09:18
3	Roppongi 3K (Sho and Yoh) (with Rocky Romero) defeated Funky Future (Ricochet and Ryusuke Taguchi) (c)	Tag team match for the IWGP Junior Heavyweight Tag Team Championship	14:52
4	Killer Elite Squad (Davey Boy Smith Jr. and Lance Archer) (c) defeated Guerrillas of Destiny (Tama Tonga and Tanga Loa) and War Machine (Hanson and Raymond Rowe)	Three-way tornado elimination match for the IWGP Tag Team Championship	16:10
5	Luxury Trio (Cody, Kenny Omega and Marty Scurll) defeated Chaos (Beretta, Jado and Yoshi-Hashi)	Six-man tag team match	13:42
6	Juice Robinson and Kota Ibushi defeated Ace to King (Hiroshi Tanahashi and Togi Makabe)	Tag team match	10:26
7	Will Ospreay defeated Kushida (c)	Singles match for the IWGP Junior Heavyweight Championship	15:32
8	Tetsuya Naito defeated Tomohiro Ishii	Singles match for the Tokyo Dome IWGP Heavyweight Championship challenge rights certificate	23:56
9	Kazuchika Okada (c) (with Gedo) defeated Evil	Singles match for the IWGP Heavyweight Championship	33:26
(c) / – the champion(s) heading into the match
