= King of Pro-Wrestling (2014) =

- Promotional poster for the event, featuring various NJPW wrestlers
- Promotion: New Japan Pro-Wrestling
- Date: October 13, 2014
- City: Tokyo, Japan
- Venue: Ryōgoku Kokugikan
- Attendance: 9,100

Pay-per-view chronology
← Previous; Destruction in Okayama	Next → Road to Power Struggle

King of Pro-Wrestling chronology
← Previous; 2013	Next → 2015

New Japan Pro-Wrestling events chronology
← Previous; Destruction in Okayama	Next → Power Struggle

King of Pro-Wrestling (2014) was a professional wrestling pay-per-view (PPV) event promoted by New Japan Pro-Wrestling (NJPW). The event took place on October 13, 2014, in Tokyo at Ryōgoku Kokugikan and featured ten matches, six of which were contested for championships. It was the third event under the King of Pro-Wrestling name.

== Storylines ==
King of Pro-Wrestling featured ten professional wrestling matches that involved different wrestlers from pre-existing scripted feuds and storylines. Wrestlers portrayed villains, heroes, or less distinguishable characters in the scripted events that built tension and culminated in a wrestling match or series of matches.

The entire card for the event was revealed on September 24, 2014, the day after Destruction in Okayama. The event featured two matches involving championships from the National Wrestling Alliance (NWA). In the first, the debuting Chase Owens was set to defend the NWA World Junior Heavyweight Championship against Bushi. Owens' debut was announced in a vignette at Destruction in Okyama, after which he was instantly challenged by Bushi. The second would feature the NJPW tag team Tencozy (Hiroyoshi Tenzan and Satoshi Kojima) making their fifth defense of the NWA World Tag Team Championship against previous champions K.E.S. (Davey Boy Smith Jr. and Lance Archer). At Destruction in Okayama, the Time Splitters (Alex Shelley and Kushida) successfully defended their IWGP Junior Heavyweight Tag Team Championship against El Desperado and Taichi, after which they were challenged by both Forever Hooligans (Alex Koslov and Rocky Romero) and The Young Bucks (Matt Jackson and Nick Jackson), leading to King of Pro-Wrestling, where the three teams would face off in a three-way match for the title. Meanwhile, El Desperado, who had attacked IWGP Junior Heavyweight Champion Ryusuke Taguchi at Destruction in Kobe, was set to challenge Taguchi for the junior heavyweight singles title. Also at Destruction in Okayama, Bullet Club's Yujiro Takahashi successfully defended the NEVER Openweight Championship against Chaos' Yoshi-Hashi, after which he was confronted by Yoshi-Hashi's stablemate, the previous NEVER Openweight Champion Tomohiro Ishii. At King of Pro-Wrestling Takahashi and Ishii were set to face off in another title match, a rematch from June 29 and the Kizuna Road 2014 event.

In the semi-main event, Kazuchika Okada was booked to defend his certificate for an IWGP Heavyweight Championship match at Wrestle Kingdom 9 in Tokyo Dome, which he had obtained by winning the 2014 G1 Climax, against Tetsuya Naito. During G1 Climax, Okada had been defeated by Naito, which resulted in him nominating Naito as his next challenger for the certificate. In the main event, Bullet Club's A.J. Styles would make his third defense of the IWGP Heavyweight Championship against Hiroshi Tanahashi. After failing to capture the IWGP Heavyweight Championship from Okada at the 2013 King of Pro-Wrestling, Tanahashi announced that he was leaving the title picture. However, after defeating Katsuyori Shibata at Destruction in Kobe, Tanahashi announced he was back and looking for a shot at A.J. Styles. Tanahashi and Styles previously faced off in Ryōgoku Kokugikan on February 17, 2008, and more recently met in a special non-tournament singles match during the final day of the 2014 G1 Climax. Tanahashi won the match, but was afterwards attacked by Bullet Club's newest member, Jeff Jarrett. Jarrett did not make another appearance for NJPW for two months, but was working behind the scenes on getting Wrestle Kingdom 9 in Tokyo Dome broadcast on the American PPV market. On September 29, Jarrett announced he was returning to NJPW at King of Pro-Wrestling.

== Event ==
In the second match of the event, the debuting Chase Owens successfully defended the NWA World Junior Heavyweight Championship against Bushi. After the match, NWA president Bruce Tharpe, who had accompanied Owens to the ring, nominated NJPW wrestler Jyushin Thunder Liger as the next challenger for Owens' title. In the following match, Tencozy's six-month reign as the NWA World Tag Team Champions came to an end as they were defeated by K.E.S. in their fifth title defense. Post-match, Kojima and Tenzan began arguing with each other, setting up a potential break-up storyline. In the third title match of the event, Time Splitters made their third successful defense of the IWGP Junior Heavyweight Tag Team Championship, defeating Forever Hooligans and The Young Bucks in a three-way match. This was followed by Ryusuke Taguchi also successfully defending the IWGP Junior Heavyweight Championship against El Desperado, despite a pre-match attack by El Desperado's Suzuki-gun stablemates Taichi and Taka Michinoku. Following the match, Taichi and Michinoku attacked Taguchi once more. In the fifth title match, Tomohiro Ishii became the first ever two-time NEVER Openweight Champion by defeating Yujiro Takahashi in his second title defense. The event also featured a tag team match, where Hirooki Goto and Katsuyori Shibata defeated Shinsuke Nakamura and Yoshi-Hashi, with Shibata pinning Yoshi-Hashi for the win. After the match, Nakamura nominated Shibata as his next challenger for the IWGP Intercontinental Championship.

In the semi-main event, 2014 G1 Climax winner Kazuchika Okada defeated 2013 G1 Climax winner Tetsuya Naito to retain his status as the number one contender to the IWGP Heavyweight Championship at the Tokyo Dome. Finally, in the main event, A.J. Styles, accompanied by Jeff Jarrett, defended the IWGP Heavyweight Championship against Hiroshi Tanahashi. Towards the end of the match, as Jarrett went to interfere in the match, Yoshitatsu made his return to NJPW after a seven-year stint in WWE and stopped his attempt. This was followed by Tanahashi hitting Styles with the High Fly Flow to win the match and become the IWGP Heavyweight Champion for the record-breaking seventh time. The event concluded with Tanahashi having a staredown with Kazuchika Okada, setting up the main event for Wrestle Kingdom 9 in Tokyo Dome.

== Reception ==
Dave Meltzer of the Wrestling Observer Newsletter called the show "excellent", giving the highest rating of four and a half stars out of five to the NEVER Openweight Championship match, calling it "the best singles match with Takahashi that [he had] ever seen". Meltzer gave the lowest rating of two stars to the NWA World Junior Heavyweight Championship match, writing that the debuting Chase Owens "seemed out of his league here, both in look and work". Overall, Meltzer called King of Pro-Wrestling "excellent show by most standards", while also noting that NJPW had produced better shows earlier in the year, calling the matches before the intermission (matches 1–6) "so-so". In reviewing the show for the Pro Wrestling Torch, Sean Radican gave the highest rating of four and a half stars out of five to both the IWGP Heavyweight Championship match and the match between Okada and Naito. Overall, Radican called the show "amazing".

== Results ==
No.	Results	Stipulations	Times
1	Kota Ibushi, Togi Makabe, Tomoaki Honma and Yuji Nagata defeated Bullet Club (Bad Luck Fale, Doc Gallows, Karl Anderson and Tama Tonga)	Eight-man tag team match	07:48
2	Chase Owens (c) (with Bruce Tharpe) defeated Bushi	Singles match for the NWA World Junior Heavyweight Championship	07:02
3	K.E.S. (Davey Boy Smith Jr. and Lance Archer) defeated Tencozy (Hiroyoshi Tenzan and Satoshi Kojima) (c)	Tag team match for the NWA World Tag Team Championship	11:22
4	Kazushi Sakuraba and Toru Yano defeated Suzuki-gun (Minoru Suzuki and Takashi Iizuka)	Tag team match	05:30
5	Time Splitters (Alex Shelley and Kushida) (c) defeated Forever Hooligans (Alex Koslov and Rocky Romero) and The Young Bucks (Matt Jackson and Nick Jackson)	Three-way tag team match for the IWGP Junior Heavyweight Tag Team Championship	18:56
6	Ryusuke Taguchi (c) defeated El Desperado (with Taichi and Taka Michinoku)	Singles match for the IWGP Junior Heavyweight Championship	12:12
7	Tomohiro Ishii defeated Yujiro Takahashi (c) (with Mao)	Singles match for the NEVER Openweight Championship	17:48
8	Meiyu Tag (Hirooki Goto and Katsuyori Shibata) defeated Chaos (Shinsuke Nakamura and Yoshi-Hashi)	Tag team match	13:49
9	Kazuchika Okada (with Gedo) defeated Tetsuya Naito	Singles match for the Tokyo Dome IWGP Heavyweight Championship challenge rights certificate	19:17
10	Hiroshi Tanahashi defeated A.J. Styles (c) (with Jeff Jarrett)	Singles match for the IWGP Heavyweight Championship	27:04
(c) / – the champion(s) heading into the match
