= King of Pro-Wrestling (2015) =

2015 New Japan Pro-Wrestling pay-per-view event

- Promotional poster for the event, featuring various NJPW wrestler
- Promotion: New Japan Pro-Wrestling
- Date: October 12, 2015
- City: Tokyo, Japan
- Venue: Ryōgoku Kokugikan
- Attendance: 8,302

Pay-per-view chronology
| ← Previous; G1 Climax 25 | Next → Power Struggle |

King of Pro-Wrestling chronology
| ← Previous; 2014 | Next → 2016 |

New Japan Pro-Wrestling events chronology
| ← Previous; Global Wars UK | Next → Power Struggle |

King of Pro-Wrestling (2015) was a professional wrestling pay-per-view (PPV) event promoted by New Japan Pro-Wrestling (NJPW). The event took place on October 12, 2015, in Tokyo at Ryōgoku Kokugikan. The main event saw Kazuchika Okada defending the IWGP Heavyweight Championship against A.J. Styles. All in all, the event featured nine matches, four of which were contested for championships.

In addition to airing worldwide through NJPW World, the event also aired in Japan as a regular PPV through SKY PerfecTV!. It was also first event on NJPW World to feature English commentary, provided by Kevin Kelly and Matt Striker. It was the fourth event under the King of Pro-Wrestling name.

== Production ==
=== Background ===
King of Pro-Wrestling is considered NJPW's biggest event between August's G1 Climax and the January 4 Tokyo Dome Show.

=== Storylines ===
King of Pro-Wrestling featured nine professional wrestling matches that involved different wrestlers from pre-existing scripted feuds and storylines. Wrestlers portrayed villains, heroes, or less distinguishable characters in the scripted events that built tension and culminated in a wrestling match or series of matches.

King of Pro-Wrestling was main evented by Kazuchika Okada defending his IWGP Heavyweight Championship against A.J. Styles in a rematch from July's Dominion 7.5 in Osaka-jo Hall, where Okada defeated Styles to become the new champion. Following Dominion 7.5, both Okada and Styles entered NJPW's annual premier tournament, the G1 Climax, where they wrestled in separate blocks. Both entered their final round-robin matches with a chance to advance to the finals of the tournament, but were both eliminated after losing to Shinsuke Nakamura and Hiroshi Tanahashi, respectively. On August 16, the final day of the tournament, Okada and Styles faced off in a six-man tag team match, where Okada teamed with Matt Taven and Michael Bennett and Styles with his Bullet Club stablemates Doc Gallows and Karl Anderson. Styles won the match for his team by scoring a direct pinfall over Okada and afterwards posed with his IWGP Heavyweight Championship belt. On August 24, NJPW announced a title rematch between Okada and Styles for King of Pro-Wrestling. This would mark the fifth singles match between the two with both having won two of their previous encounters.

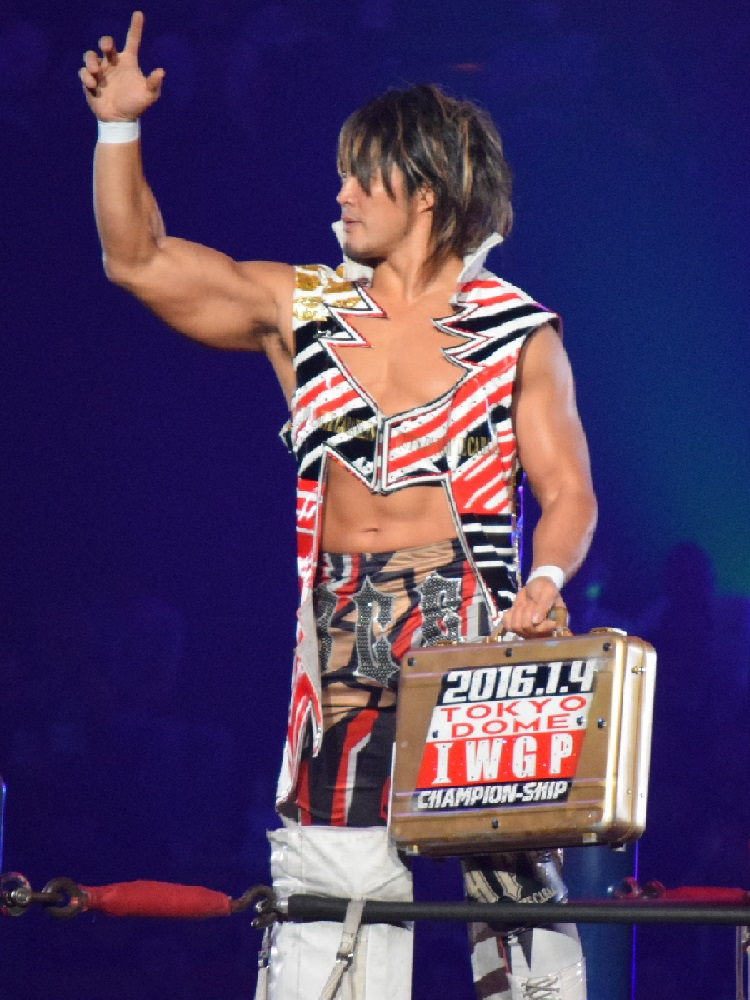
Hiroshi Tanahashi holding a briefcase containing the Wrestle Kingdom 10 IWGP Heavyweight Championship match contract

The rest of the matches for King of Pro-Wrestling were announced on September 28, the day after Destruction in Kobe. One of the top matches would see 2015 G1 Climax winner Hiroshi Tanahashi put his prize for winning said tournament, a contract for an IWGP Heavyweight Championship match at Wrestle Kingdom 10 in Tokyo Dome, on the line against Tetsuya Naito. During the tournament, Tanahashi suffered two losses; against Bad Luck Fale and Naito. After successfully defending the contract against Fale at Destruction in Kobe, Tanahashi himself nominated Naito as his next challenger. This marks the final defense of the contract with the winner securing a spot in the main event of Wrestle Kingdom 10. Naito, however, sarcastically suggested a fan vote to determine the true main event of show, making it known he still held a grudge against Tanahashi and NJPW fans for the events that led to the 2014 Wrestle Kingdom 8 in Tokyo Dome event. Naito had won the 2013 G1 Climax and was in line to main event the Tokyo Dome event, however, following a fan voting, his IWGP Heavyweight Championship match was demoted with Tanahashi and Shinsuke Nakamura's IWGP Intercontinental Championship match taking over the main event spot. Naito also teased bringing in a pareja (Spanish for "partner") to witness the match at King of Pro-Wrestling. Over the summer, Naito had joined Los Ingobernables, a stable based in the Mexican Consejo Mundial de Lucha Libre (CMLL) promotion, which led to him debuting a new villainous persona in NJPW. Between the G1 Climax and King of Pro-Wrestling, Naito had been involved in a heated rivalry with Katsuyori Shibata.

The event was also set to feature the fourth NEVER Openweight Championship match of 2015 between Togi Makabe and Tomohiro Ishii. The previous matches took place on January 4 at Wrestle Kingdom 9 in Tokyo Dome, April 29 at Wrestling Hinokuni and July 5 at Dominion 7.5 in Osaka-jo Hall and were all won by Makabe. After successfully defending his title against Kota Ibushi at Destruction in Okayama on September 23, Makabe was confronted by Ishii and promptly accepted a challenge for another title match between the two.

Both of NJPW's junior heavyweight championships were also defended at King of Pro-Wrestling. Kenny Omega would defend the IWGP Junior Heavyweight Championship against former Dragon Gate and WWE worker Matt Sydal. Sydal first entered the title picture in August by defeating then IWGP Junior Heavyweight Champion Kushida in a non-title match at a Ring of Honor (ROH) event, after which Kushida agreed to defend the title against him. Sydal debuted for NJPW at Destruction in Okayama, however, his title match with Kushida never came to fruition as the same day, Kushida lost the title back to previous champion Kenny Omega, setting up a title match between Sydal and Omega instead. Four days later at Destruction in Kobe, Sydal pinned Omega in a six-man tag team match. Meanwhile, the IWGP Junior Heavyweight Tag Team Champions reDRagon (Bobby Fish and Kyle O'Reilly) would defend their title against Roppongi Vice (Beretta and Rocky Romero). This match stemmed from Destruction in Kobe, where Roppongi Vice attacked reDRagon after they had successfully defended their title against Time Splitters (Alex Shelley and Kushida).

King of Pro-Wrestling also featured a six-man tag team match between the Bullet Club trio of Bad Luck Fale and IWGP Tag Team Champions Doc Gallows and Karl Anderson and the trio of Kazushi Sakuraba, Shinsuke Nakamura and Toru Yano, which builds to a future IWGP Intercontinental Championship match between champion Nakamura and challenger Anderson. The undercard also featured a singles match between Tomoaki Honma and Yoshi-Hashi, stemming from the fact that Yoshi-Hashi wanted to take part in the 2015 G1 Climax, but was ultimately forced to sit out with Honma taking the final open spot in the tournament. NJPW also suggested that the winner of the match could be in line for a shot at the NEVER Openweight Championship.

== Event ==
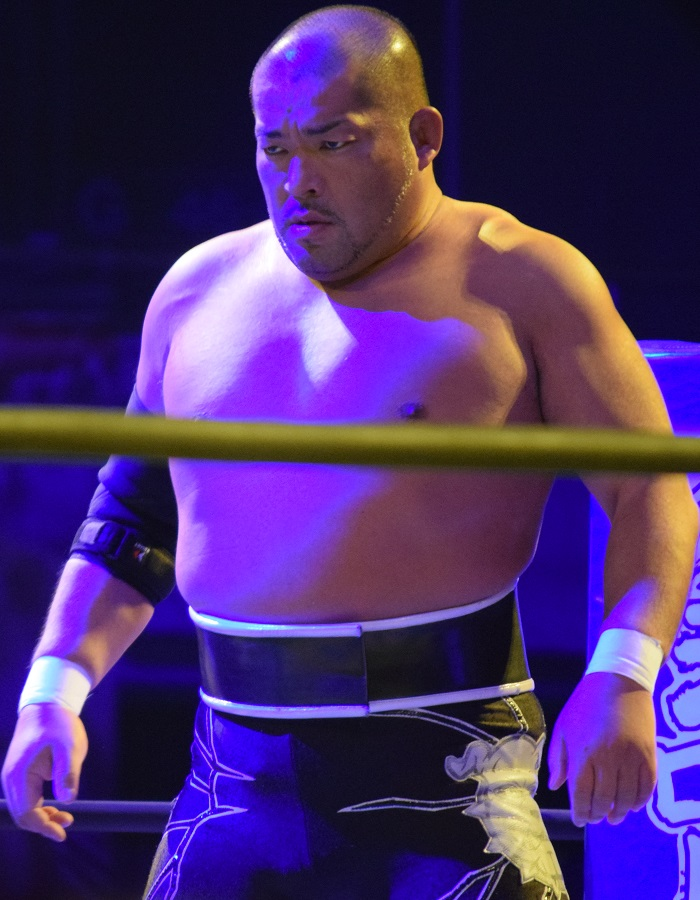
Tomohiro Ishii, who regained the NEVER Openweight Championship in the only title change of King of Pro-Wrestling

The first title match of the event saw reDRagon make their second successful defense of the IWGP Junior Heavyweight Tag Team Championship against Roppongi Vice. The match was ended early as a result of a botch, when Rocky Romero was late in breaking up a pin attempt made by Kyle O'Reilly. In the second title match, Kenny Omega made his first successful defense of the IWGP Junior Heavyweight Championship against Matt Sydal. The third championship match of the event saw the only title change of the event, when Tomohiro Ishii defeated Togi Makabe to win the NEVER Openweight Championship for the fourth time. Afterwards, Ishii was challenged by Tomoaki Honma, who had defeated Yoshi-Hashi in their match earlier in the event.

In the semi-main event of the show, Hiroshi Tanahashi successfully defended his Tokyo Dome contract against Tetsuya Naito. Naito was accompanied to the match by his pareja, a man in a mask. After Naito threw Tanahashi into referee Red Shoes Unno, the man entered the ring, unmasked himself as Takaaki Watanabe and attacked Tanahashi. This marked Watanabe's return to NJPW following a two-year overseas learning excursion. Eventually Naito's rival Katsuyori Shibata and his tag team partner Hirooki Goto ran out to put a stop to Watanabe's outside interference, which led to Tanahashi pinning Naito for the win. Following the match, Watanabe laid out Goto, before exiting the arena with Naito. The main event saw Kazuchika Okada make his first successful defense of the IWGP Heavyweight Championship against A.J. Styles, setting up Okada and Tanahashi as the main event of Wrestle Kingdom 10 in Tokyo Dome.

== Reception ==
Dave Meltzer of the Wrestling Observer Newsletter wrote that King of Pro-Wrestling exemplified the "feeling of sameness" in NJPW and that while the show in his opinion had only one bad match (the six-man tag team match), it was lacking compared to similar big shows in recent years. Meltzer also noted that several wrestlers, most notably Hiroshi Tanahashi, Shinsuke Nakamura, Tomoaki Honma and Tomohiro Ishii had not recovered from the G1 Climax, while highlighting what he considered "elementary booking issues", such as booking back-to-back junior heavyweight title matches with all foreign wrestlers and the final two matches being "Americanized" with ref bumps and outside interference. Mike Johnson of Pro Wrestling Insider called the main event "excellent" and "well worth going out of your way to see". Sean Radican of Pro Wrestling Torch gave the event an overall score of 8.0, calling it a "very good show", though adding that the undercard tag team matches were "a bit of a chore to get through" and that "some of the big matches on the card didn't deliver as [he] expected".

== Results ==
| No. | Results | Stipulations | Times |
|---|---|---|---|
| 1 | Jyushin Thunder Liger, Kushida, Máscara Dorada, Ryusuke Taguchi and Tiger Mask defeated David Finlay, Jay White, Juice Robinson, Sho Tanaka and Yohei Komatsu | Ten-man tag team match | 08:47 |
| 2 | Tomoaki Honma defeated Yoshi-Hashi | Singles match | 08:55 |
| 3 | Hiroyoshi Tenzan, Manabu Nakanishi, Satoshi Kojima and Yuji Nagata defeated Captain New Japan, Hirooki Goto, Katsuyori Shibata and Kota Ibushi | Eight-man tag team match | 12:12 |
| 4 | reDRagon (Bobby Fish and Kyle O'Reilly) (c) defeated Roppongi Vice (Beretta and Rocky Romero) | Tag team match for the IWGP Junior Heavyweight Tag Team Championship | 15:21 |
| 5 | Kenny Omega (c) (with Cody Hall) defeated Matt Sydal | Singles match for the IWGP Junior Heavyweight Championship | 15:26 |
| 6 | Chaos (Kazushi Sakuraba, Shinsuke Nakamura and Toru Yano) defeated Bullet Club (Bad Luck Fale, Doc Gallows and Karl Anderson) (with Tama Tonga) | Six-man tag team match | 07:03 |
| 7 | Tomohiro Ishii defeated Togi Makabe (c) | Singles match for the NEVER Openweight Championship | 17:54 |
| 8 | Hiroshi Tanahashi (with Captain New Japan) defeated Tetsuya Naito (with EVIL) | Singles match for the Tokyo Dome IWGP Heavyweight Championship challenge rights certificate | 19:55 |
| 9 | Kazuchika Okada (c) (with Gedo) defeated A.J. Styles (with Doc Gallows, Karl Anderson and Tama Tonga) | Singles match for the IWGP Heavyweight Championship | 30:15 |
(c) / – the champion(s) heading into the match
