= King of Pro-Wrestling (2013) =

2013 New Japan Pro-Wrestling event

- Promotional poster for the event, featuring Kazuchika Okada, Hiroshi Tanahashi, Shinsuke Nakamura and Prince Devitt
- Promotion: New Japan Pro-Wrestling
- Date: October 14, 2013
- City: Tokyo, Japan
- Venue: Ryōgoku Kokugikan
- Attendance: 9,000

Pay-per-view chronology
← Previous; Destruction	Next → Power Struggle

King of Pro-Wrestling chronology
← Previous; 2012	Next → 2014

King of Pro-Wrestling (2013) was a professional wrestling pay-per-view (PPV) event promoted by New Japan Pro-Wrestling (NJPW). The event took place on October 14, 2013, in Tokyo at Ryōgoku Kokugikan and featured ten matches (including one dark match), four of which were contested for championships. It was the second event under the King of Pro-Wrestling name.

== Storylines ==
King of Pro-Wrestling featured ten professional wrestling matches that involved different wrestlers from pre-existing scripted feuds and storylines. Wrestlers portrayed villains, heroes, or less distinguishable characters in the scripted events that built tension and culminated in a wrestling match or series of matches.

== Event ==
Alex Shelley was scheduled to wrestle at the event, teaming with Kushida to challenge for the IWGP Junior Heavyweight Tag Team Championship, however, he was forced to pull out after suffering a back injury. Shelley and Kushida were replaced in the title match by Taichi and Taka Michinoku, who would ultimately go on to defeat the Forever Hooligans (Alex Koslov and Rocky Romero) and become the new champions. The third match on the pay-per-view, saw Hiroyoshi Tenzan wrestle his return match from a rib injury and rookie Takaaki Watanabe his final match before leaving for a learning excursion to the United States. The event featured Kota Ibushi's first match under a NJPW contract, Tetsuya Naito successfully defending the NEVER Openweight Championship and his status as the number one contender to the IWGP Heavyweight Championship against former partner Yujiro Takahashi as well as outside participation from Pro Wrestling Noah representative Naomichi Marufuji, who unsuccessfully challenged Shinsuke Nakamura for the IWGP Intercontinental Championship. The event also featured an appearance by Daniel Gracie and Rolles Gracie, who announced that they were going to be taking part in Wrestle Kingdom 8 in Tokyo Dome in January 2014. In the main event Kazuchika Okada successfully defended the IWGP Heavyweight Championship against Hiroshi Tanahashi, who vowed to pull himself out of the Heavyweight title picture as a result.

== Reception ==
For the second year in a row, the main event of King of Pro-Wrestling received a five-star rating from sports journalist Dave Meltzer.

== Results ==
No.	Results	Stipulations	Times
1^{D}	Jyushin Thunder Liger, Manabu Nakanishi, Super Strong Machine and Tiger Mask defeated Chaos (Gedo, Jado, Takashi Iizuka and Yoshi-Hashi)	Eight-man tag team match	08:28
2	Suzuki-gun (Taichi and Taka Michinoku) defeated Forever Hooligans (Alex Koslov and Rocky Romero) (c)	Tag team match for the IWGP Junior Heavyweight Tag Team Championship	07:27
3	Minoru Suzuki defeated Toru Yano	Singles match	07:09
4	K.E.S. (Davey Boy Smith Jr. and Lance Archer) defeated Hiroyoshi Tenzan and EVIL	Tag team match	11:48
5	Bullet Club (Bad Luck Fale, Karl Anderson and Prince Devitt) defeated G.B.H. (Togi Makabe and Tomoaki Honma) and Kota Ibushi	Six-man tag team match	10:37
6	Katsuyori Shibata defeated Tomohiro Ishii	Singles match	15:47
7	Yuji Nagata defeated Kazushi Sakuraba	Singles match	10:25
8	Tetsuya Naito (c) defeated Yujiro Takahashi (with Lisa and Mao)	Singles match for the NEVER Openweight Championship and Tokyo Dome IWGP Heavyweight Championship challenge rights certificate	16:35
9	Shinsuke Nakamura (c) defeated Naomichi Marufuji	Singles match for the IWGP Intercontinental Championship	16:18
10	Kazuchika Okada (c) (with Gedo) defeated Hiroshi Tanahashi	Singles match for the IWGP Heavyweight Championship	35:17
(c) / – the champion(s) heading into the match; D / – this was a dark match
