= King of Pro-Wrestling (2016) =

2016 New Japan Pro-Wrestling event

- Promotional poster for the event, featuring various NJPW wrestlers
- Promotion: New Japan Pro-Wrestling
- Date: October 10, 2016
- City: Tokyo, Japan
- Venue: Ryōgoku Kokugikan
- Attendance: 9,671

Event chronology
← Previous; New Japan Road: Ganbarou! Uonuma	Next → Wrestling World 2016 in Taiwan

King of Pro-Wrestling chronology
← Previous; 2015	Next → 2017

New Japan Pro-Wrestling events chronology
← Previous; Destruction	Next → Power Struggle

King of Pro-Wrestling (2016) was a professional wrestling event promoted by New Japan Pro-Wrestling (NJPW), which took place on October 10, 2016, in Tokyo at Ryōgoku Kokugikan. It was the fifth event under the King of Pro-Wrestling name.

== Production ==
=== Background ===
King of Pro-Wrestling is considered NJPW's biggest event between August's G1 Climax and the January 4 Tokyo Dome Show.

=== Storylines ===
King of Pro-Wrestling featured nine professional wrestling matches that involved different wrestlers from pre-existing scripted feuds and storylines. Wrestlers portrayed villains, heroes, or less distinguishable characters in the scripted events that built tension and culminated in a wrestling match or series of matches.

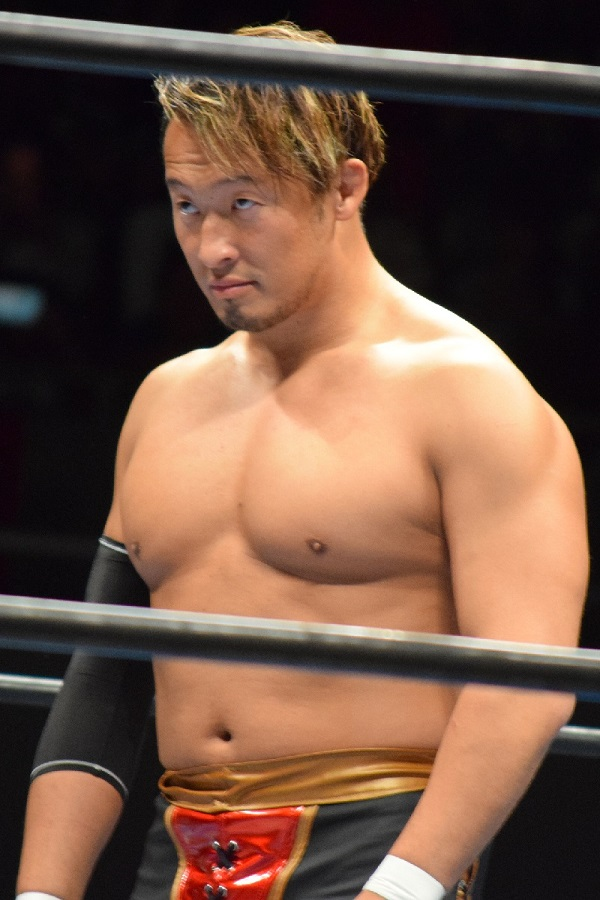
Pro Wrestling Noah representative Naomichi Marufuji, who challenged for the IWGP Heavyweight Championship in the main event

King of Pro-Wrestling was main evented by Kazuchika Okada defending the IWGP Heavyweight Championship against Pro Wrestling Noah representative Naomichi Marufuji. The match stemmed from the previous summer's G1 Climax tournament, where the two wrestled in the same block. While both failed to advance from the block, Okada with a record of five wins, three losses and one draw and Marufuji with a record of five wins and four losses, Marufuji was victorious over the reigning IWGP Heavyweight Champion in their opening match on July 18. On August 14, the final day of the tournament, Okada himself nominated Marufuji as his next title challenger. During the two months between the announcement and the match, Marufuji's GHC Tag Team Championship, which he held in his home promotion with Okada's Chaos stablemate Toru Yano, also came into play. On September 25, after Okada and his Chaos stablemates Gedo, Jado and Yoshi-Hashi had defeated Marufuji, Yano and two other Noah representatives, Atsushi Kotoge and Daisuke Harada, in an eight-man tag team match, Okada and Yoshi-Hashi challenged Marufuji and Yano to a tag team title match at Noah's October 8 event. Marufuji and Yano went on to retain their title with Marufuji pinning Yoshi-Hashi for the win. The King of Pro-Wrestling main event marked Marufuji's second shot at the IWGP Heavyweight Championship, having unsuccessfully challenged Hiroshi Tanahashi for the title in September 2012.

The semi-main event of the show featured a rematch from the finals of the 2016 G1 Climax as Kenny Omega took on Hirooki Goto. On August 14, Omega defeated Goto to win the G1 Climax and earn a contract for a shot at the IWGP Heavyweight Championship on January 4, 2017, at Wrestle Kingdom 11 in Tokyo Dome. The holder of the contract would have to defend it until the end of the year in order to get his title shot. Omega made his first defense on September 22 at Destruction in Hiroshima, defeating Chaos member Yoshi-Hashi, who had defeated him during the G1 Climax. Following the match, Yoshi-Hashi's stablemate Hirooki Goto entered the ring and challenged Omega to a rematch from their final match. Omega first asked the audience if they wanted to see the match, but when the audience responded with a loud cheer, told Goto to "go to hell". NJPW, however, officially announced the rematch on September 26.

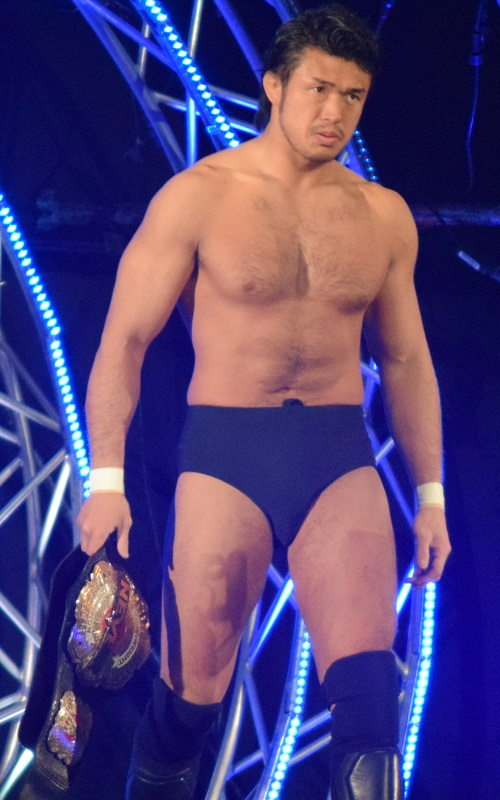
Katsuyori Shibata, defended the NEVER Openweight Championship at the event

The NEVER Openweight Championship would also be defended at King of Pro-Wrestling as reigning champion Katsuyori Shibata defends against Kyle O'Reilly. This match stemmed from the September 19 Destruction in Tokyo event, where Shibata successfully defended the title against O'Reilly's reDRagon tag team partner Bobby Fish. Following the match, O'Reilly confronted Shibata, challenging him to a title match, which was accepted by Shibata and officially announced on September 26. O'Reilly, much like Fish, held a victory over Shibata from a Ring of Honor (ROH) event the previous August.

Both of NJPW's tag team titles would also be defended at the event. The IWGP Tag Team Championship match was set to feature a rematch from the previous June's Dominion 6.19 in Osaka-jo Hall, where The Briscoe Brothers (Jay Briscoe and Mark Briscoe) would defend against the Guerrillas of Destiny (Tama Tonga and Tanga Loa). After capturing the title at Dominion 6.19, The Briscoe Brothers went on to make their first successful title defense against The Young Bucks (Matt Jackson and Nick Jackson) on September 22, but were afterwards attacked by the Guerrillas of Destiny, who demanded a rematch. In the IWGP Junior Heavyweight Tag Team Championship match, The Young Bucks were set to defend the title against David Finlay and Ricochet. On September 25 at Destruction in Kobe, Finlay, who had recently graduated from his "young lion" status, replaced Ricochet's regular tag team partner Matt Sydal in a match, where the two teamed with Satoshi Kojima to defeat The Young Bucks and Adam Cole for the vacant NEVER Openweight 6-Man Tag Team Championship. Following the win, Finlay proceeded to challenge The Young Bucks to a match for their junior heavyweight tag team title. Sydal had missed the Hiroshima and Kobe shows officially due to "travel issues". Heading into King of Pro-Wrestling, Finlay essentially took over his spot as Ricochet's regular tag team partner.

Other featured matches included an eight-man tag team match, where the Los Ingobernables de Japón (L.I.J.) stable of Bushi, Evil, Sanada and Tetsuya Naito take on Hiroshi Tanahashi, Jay Lethal, Kushida and Michael Elgin. Over September's Destruction tour, Bushi captured the IWGP Junior Heavyweight Championship from Kushida, while Naito, the leader of L.I.J., defeated Elgin for the IWGP Intercontinental Championship in a match, which featured outside interference from not only Bushi, Evil and Sanada, but also Kushida and Tanahashi, with the latter two coming to Elgin's aid. ROH wrestler Jay Lethal had been a part of L.I.J., before having a falling out with the group during an ROH show in August. Another eight-man tag team match will feature four wrestlers from the Pro Wrestling Noah promotion; Go Shiozaki, Katsuhiko Nakajima, Masa Kitamiya and Maybach Taniguchi taking on the NJPW quartet of Hiroyoshi Tenzan, Manabu Nakanishi, Satoshi Kojima and Yuji Nagata.

Prior to King of Pro-Wrestling, NJPW was set to present a special match celebrating the October 1 launch of the new Tiger Mask W anime on TV Asahi. In the match, Tiger Mask W would take on Red Death Mask.

== Event ==
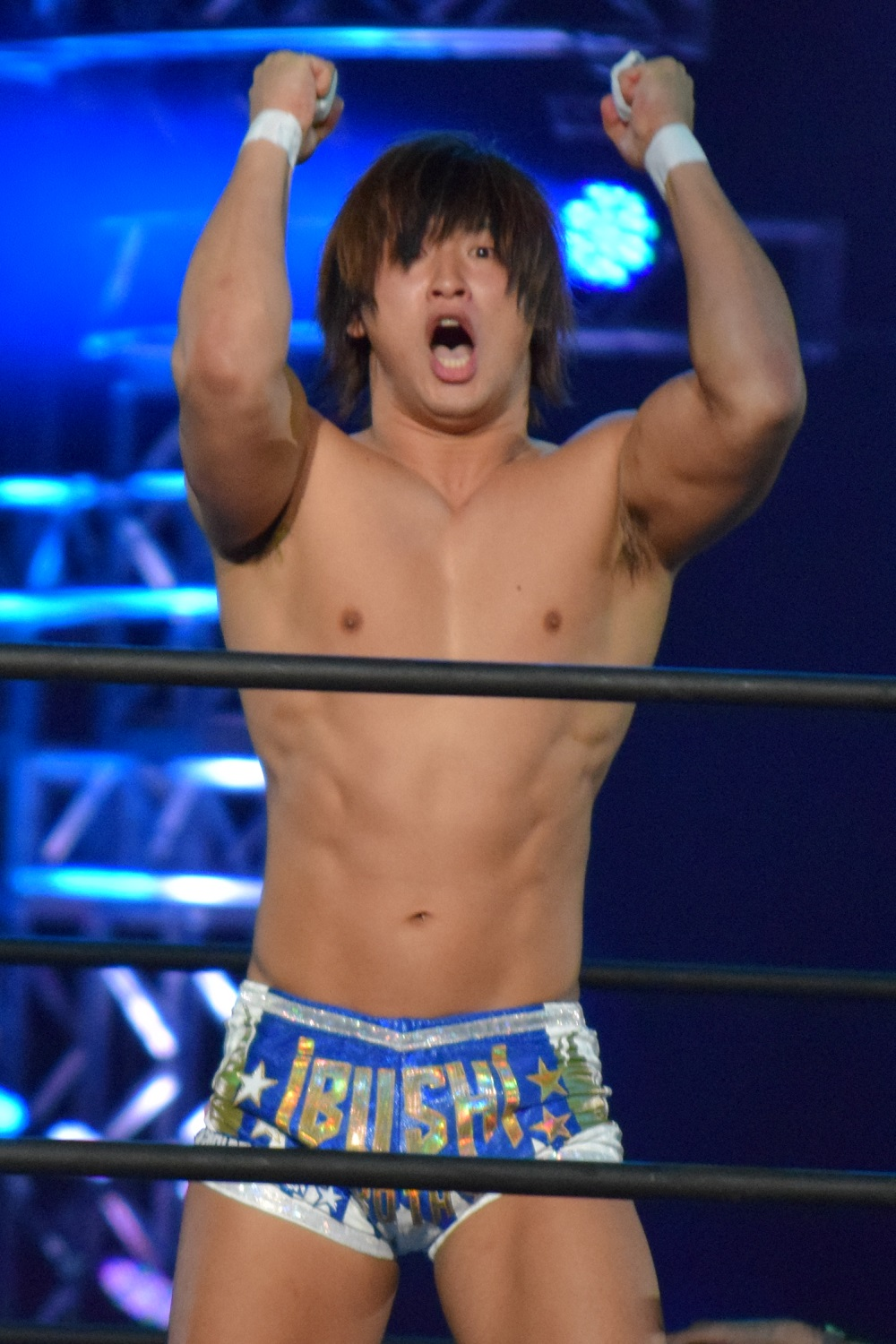
Kota Ibushi, who made a surprise return to NJPW as "Tiger Mask W"

Prior to the King of Pro-Wrestling event, Tiger Mask W defeated Red Death Mask in a pre-show match. During the match, Tiger Mask W performed several of Kota Ibushi's signature moves, which led to the crowd chanting Ibushi's name. Shortly after the event it was confirmed that the character had been portrayed by Ibushi. Ibushi had resigned from NJPW in February 2016, stating that he wanted to continue his career as a freelancer. Throughout 2016, Ibushi wrestled for several promotions in both Japan and the United States, most notably taking part in WWE's Cruiserweight Classic tournament. WWE reportedly made several attempts to sign Ibushi to a contract, but he insisted on remaining a free agent. Prior to his surprise return to NJPW, WWE had already announced Ibushi for their upcoming Dusty Rhodes Tag Team Classic tournament.

The first title match of King of Pro-Wrestling saw The Young Bucks make their second successful defense of the IWGP Junior Heavyweight Tag Team Championship against David Finlay and Ricochet with Matt Jackson pinning Finlay following the More Bang for Your Buck. In the next match, the Guerrillas of Destiny defeated the Briscoe Brothers to regain the IWGP Tag Team Championship with Tama Tonga pinning Mark Briscoe with the Guerrilla Warfare double-team finishing maneuver. After the match, the Guerrillas of Destiny, along with their Bullet Club stablemates The Young Bucks, continued attacking the Briscoe Brothers. This led to Tomohiro Ishii trying to make the save, but he was stopped after being hit with the Guerrilla Warfare.

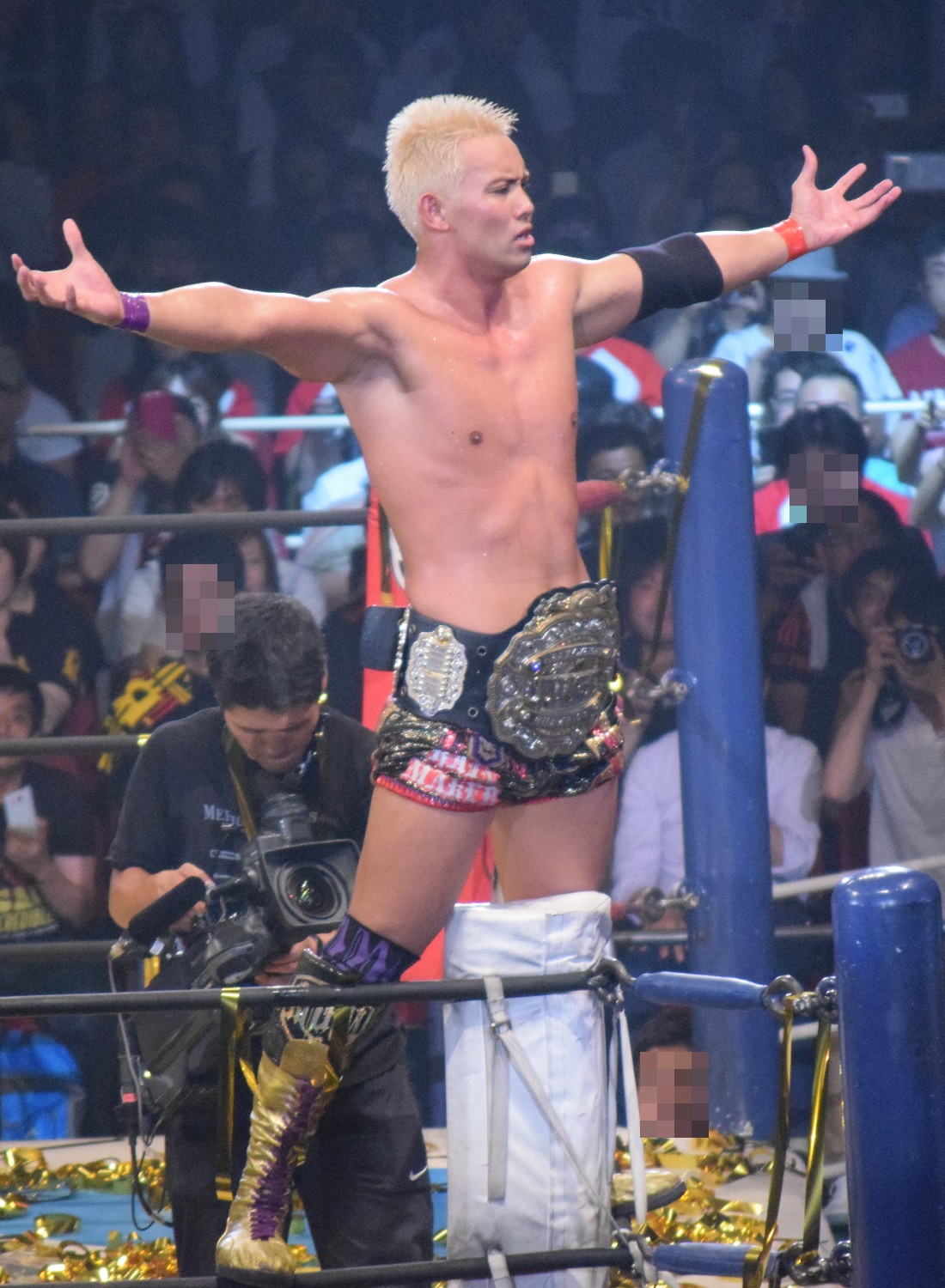
Kazuchika Okada, who retained the IWGP Heavyweight Championship in the main event

The next match saw Hiroshi Tanahashi, Jay Lethal, Kushida and Michael Elgin take on the Los Ingobernables de Japón stable of Bushi, Evil, Sanada and Tetsuya Naito. The match ended with Lethal and Elgin isolating Naito from his stablemates with Lethal hitting him with the Lethal Injection, after which Elgin pinned him for the win with the Elgin Bomb. Following the match, Elgin posed with Naito's IWGP Intercontinental Championship belt, before the victors were attacked by L.I.J. As Kushida was being stretchered out of the arena with a supposed neck injury, Bushi nominated him as his next challenger for the IWGP Junior Heavyweight Championship.

The next title match saw Katsuyori Shibata make his third successful defense of the NEVER Openweight Championship against Kyle O'Reilly. Shibata won the match by referee stoppage after locking O'Reilly in a sleeper hold. Following the match, Pro Wrestling Noah representative Go Shiozaki entered the ring, indicating he wanted a shot at the NEVER Openweight Championship. After Shiozaki had exited the ring, Shibata was attacked by Evil, who laid him out with the Evil and then posed with the NEVER Openweight Championship belt.

The next match saw Kenny Omega defend his contract for a shot at the IWGP Heavyweight Championship at Wrestle Kingdom 11 against Hirooki Goto. Goto attacked Omega before the opening bell, hitting him with his contract briefcase and then dropping him with a DDT on top of it. Omega, however, recovered with help from the interfering Young Bucks, and eventually won the match following a V-Trigger and the Katayoku no Tenshi, retaining his contract. In the main event of the show, Kazuchika Okada made his first successful defense of the IWGP Heavyweight Championship against Pro Wrestling Noah's Naomichi Marufuji. Towards the end of the match, Okada hit Marufuji with Noah founder Mitsuharu Misawa's signature Emerald Flowsion move and then pinned him for the win with his own finishing maneuver, the Rainmaker. After the match, Okada had a staredown with Kenny Omega, setting up the main event of Wrestle Kingdom 11 in Tokyo Dome.

== Results ==
No.	Results	Stipulations	Times
1^{P}	Tiger Mask W defeated Red Death Mask	Singles match	07:25
2	Chaos (Tomohiro Ishii, Will Ospreay and Yoshi-Hashi) defeated Bullet Club (Adam Cole, Bad Luck Fale and Yujiro Takahashi)	Six-man tag team match	08:40
3	Bobby Fish, Ryusuke Taguchi, Togi Makabe and Tomoaki Honma defeated Chaos (Beretta, Jado, Rocky Romero and Toru Yano)	Eight-man tag team match	08:10
4	Team NOAH (Go Shiozaki, Katsuhiko Nakajima, Masa Kitamiya and Maybach Taniguchi) defeated Team NJPW (Hiroyoshi Tenzan, Manabu Nakanishi, Satoshi Kojima and Yuji Nagata)	Eight-man tag team match	12:49
5	The Young Bucks (Matt Jackson and Nick Jackson) (c) defeated David Finlay and Ricochet	Tag team match for the IWGP Junior Heavyweight Tag Team Championship	12:47
6	Guerrillas of Destiny (Tama Tonga and Tanga Loa) defeated The Briscoe Brothers (Jay Briscoe and Mark Briscoe) (c)	Tag team match for the IWGP Tag Team Championship	13:57
7	Hiroshi Tanahashi, Jay Lethal, Kushida and Michael Elgin defeated Los Ingobernables de Japón (Bushi, Evil, Sanada and Tetsuya Naito)	Eight-man tag team match	11:42
8	Katsuyori Shibata (c) defeated Kyle O'Reilly (with Bobby Fish)	Singles match for the NEVER Openweight Championship	18:09
9	Kenny Omega (with Matt Jackson and Nick Jackson) defeated Hirooki Goto (with Yoshi-Hashi)	Singles match for the Tokyo Dome IWGP Heavyweight Championship challenge rights certificate	21:52
10	Kazuchika Okada (c) (with Gedo) defeated Naomichi Marufuji (with Go Shiozaki, Katsuhiko Nakajima, Masa Kitamiya and Maybach Taniguchi)	Singles match for the IWGP Heavyweight Championship	28:00
(c) / – the champion(s) heading into the match; P / – the match was broadcast on the pre-show
