= King of Pro-Wrestling (2019) =

- Promotional poster featuring Kazuchika Okada, Hiroshi Tanahashi, Tetsuya Naito, Kota Ibushi, Jay White and Kenta
- Promotion: New Japan Pro-Wrestling
- Date: October 14, 2019
- City: Tokyo, Japan
- Venue: Ryōgoku Kokugikan
- Attendance: 9,573

Event chronology
← Previous; Fighting Spirit Unleashed; New Japan Road	Next → Road to Power Struggle

King of Pro-Wrestling chronology
← Previous; 2018	Next → 2024

King of Pro-Wrestling (2019) was a professional wrestling event promoted by New Japan Pro-Wrestling. It took place on October 14, 2019 at the Ryōgoku Kokugikan in Tokyo, Japan. It was the eighth event under the King of Pro-Wrestling name.

== Production ==
=== Background ===
King of Pro-Wrestling took place on October 14, 2019, on Health and Sports Day (体育の日, Taiiku no hi), a Japanese public holiday. Due to the events of the Typhoon Hagibis, Jon Moxley and Zack Sabre Jr. were unable to fly in to Japan, prompting last minute changes to the card.

=== Storylines ===
King of Pro-Wrestling featured professional wrestling matches that involved different wrestlers from pre-existing scripted feuds and storylines. Wrestlers portrayed villains, heroes, or less distinguishable characters in the scripted events that built tension and culminated in a wrestling match or series of matches.

At the Best of the Super Juniors 26 finals on June 5, Jon Moxley defeated Juice Robinson to win the IWGP United States Heavyweight Championship. Later, Moxley and Robinson would wrestle again in the G1 Climax on August 11, with Robinson winning and thereby preventing Moxley from winning the tournament. Moxley subsequently challenged Robinson to a No Disqualification match for the United States Championship at King of Pro-Wrestling. However, Moxley was unable to attend the event due to travel issues stemming from Typhoon Hagibis. Per NJPW rules, he was stripped of the title and a match between Robinson and Lance Archer for the vacant title was scheduled instead.

On night three of the G1 Climax on July 14, Evil defeated Kota Ibushi in a block match. Despite the loss, Ibushi went on to win the tournament, becoming the holder of the Tokyo Dome IWGP Heavyweight Championship challenge rights certificate. In a post-tournament interview, Ibushi declared that he wanted to defend the certificate against those who had beaten him, setting up a match between the two for this event.

== Results ==
No.	Results	Stipulations	Times
1	Suzuki-gun (El Desperado and Yoshinobu Kanemaru) defeated Roppongi 3K (Sho and Yoh)	Tag team match	10:44
2	Hiroshi Tanahashi and Tomoaki Honma defeated The Most Violent Players (Togi Makabe and Toru Yano)	Tag team match	9:43
3	Los Ingobernables de Japón (Tetsuya Naito and Shingo Takagi) defeated Suzuki-gun (Taichi and Douki) by disqualification	Tag team match	9:00
4	Minoru Suzuki defeated Jyushin Thunder Liger	Singles match	17:38
5	Will Ospreay (c) defeated El Phantasmo	Singles match for the IWGP Junior Heavyweight Championship	27:58
6	Chaos (Hirooki Goto, Tomohiro Ishii and Yoshi-Hashi) defeated Bullet Club (Jay White, Kenta and Yujiro Takahashi)	Six-man tag team match	12:27
7	Lance Archer defeated Juice Robinson	No Disqualification match for the vacant IWGP United States Heavyweight Championship	14:58
8	Kota Ibushi defeated Evil	Singles match for the Tokyo Dome IWGP Heavyweight Championship challenge rights certificate	24:05
9	Kazuchika Okada (c) defeated Sanada	Singles match for the IWGP Heavyweight Championship	36:21
(c) / – the champion(s) heading into the match

== See also ==
- 2019 in professional wrestling
- List of NJPW pay-per-view events
