= Destruction (2017) =

Professional wrestling event

- Promotional poster for Destruction in Kobe, featuring various NJPW wrestlers
- Promotion: New Japan Pro-Wrestling
- Date: September 10, 2017; September 16, 2017; September 24, 2017
- City: Fukushima; Hiroshima; Kobe
- Venue: Azuma Gymnasium; Hiroshima Sun Plaza Hall; Kobe World Memorial Hall
- Attendance: 2,056; 3,601; 5,482

Event chronology
← Previous; Road to Destruction	Next → New Japan Road: Ganbarou! Uonuma

Destruction chronology
← Previous; 2016	Next → 2018

New Japan Pro-Wrestling events chronology
← Previous; War of the Worlds UK	Next → King of Pro-Wrestling

Destruction is a series of professional wrestling events promoted by New Japan Pro-Wrestling (NJPW) in 2017; Destruction in Fukushima on September 10, Destruction in Hiroshima on September 16, and Destruction in Kobe on September 24. Together, they were events fifteen to seventeen under the Destruction name.

== Production ==
=== Background ===
2017 was the second consecutive year in which NJPW held three events under the Destruction name. From 2007 to 2013, NJPW held one Destruction event per year, expanding to two shows in 2014 and 2015 and to three shows in 2016.

The three shows aired live through NJPW's internet streaming service, NJPW World, with English commentary provided for the Hiroshima and Kobe events.

=== Storylines ===
The Destruction shows featured professional wrestling matches, each of which involved different wrestlers from pre-existing scripted feuds and storylines. Wrestlers portrayed villains, heroes, or less distinguishable characters in the scripted events that built tension and culminated in a wrestling match or series of matches.

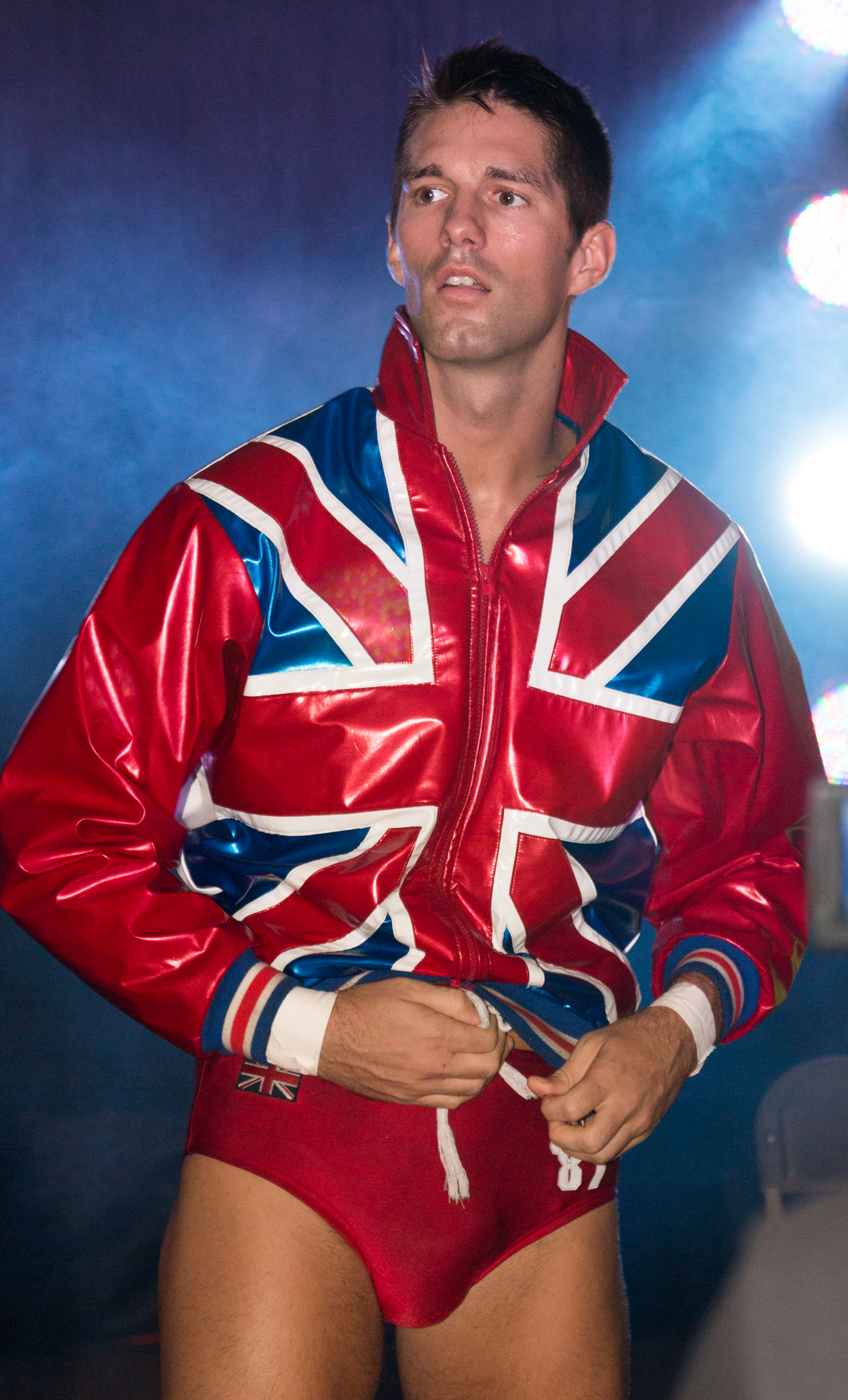
Zack Sabre Jr. challenged for the IWGP Intercontinental Championship in the main event of Destruction in Hiroshima

Destruction in Fukushima would be headlined by Minoru Suzuki making his third defense of the NEVER Openweight Championship against Michael Elgin. This match stemmed from the 2017 G1 Climax, where Elgin defeated Suzuki, challenging him to a title match afterwards. On September 7, Suzuki and Elgin agreed to turn the match into a lumberjack deathmatch, which was made official the following day. The show would also feature Chaos' Kazuchika Okada, Rocky Romero and Toru Yano challenging Los Ingobernables de Japón's Bushi, Evil and Sanada for the NEVER Openweight 6-Man Tag Team Championship. The match would mark IWGP Heavyweight Champion Okada's first-ever shot at the title and also served as a prelude to Evil challenging him for the Heavyweight title on October 9 at King of Pro-Wrestling.

Destruction in Hiroshima would be headlined by Hiroshi Tanahashi making his second IWGP Intercontinental Championship defense against Zack Sabre Jr. During the 2017 G1 Climax, Sabre put himself in title contention by scoring two submission wins over Tanahashi, first in their opening tournament match on July 17 and again in a non-tournament six-man tag team match on August 13. In the semi-main event, Sabre's Suzuki-gun stablemate El Desperado would challenge Kushida for the IWGP Junior Heavyweight Championship in the champion's second title defense. El Desperado defeated Kushida during the 2017 Best of the Super Juniors and on June 27, after Kushida had successfully defended the IWGP Junior Heavyweight Championship against Bushi, hit him with a guitar and challenged him to a title match. While Kushida was absent from the G1 Climax tour, El Desperado made repeated challenges towards him. When the two finally met on August 12, El Desperado hit Kushida with his own title belt, which he then proceeded to steal. The show would also feature Suzuki-gun, with Taichi and Yoshinobu Kanemaru challenging Funky Future (Ricochet and Ryusuke Taguchi) for the IWGP Junior Heavyweight Tag Team Championship. In addition, the show would feature Roppongi Vice's final match together as a tag team. After unsuccessfully challenging then IWGP Junior Heavyweight Tag Team Champions The Young Bucks (Matt Jackson and Nick Jackson) for the title on July 2, Roppongi Vice agreed to disband with Rocky Romero giving Beretta his blessing to move to the heavyweight division.

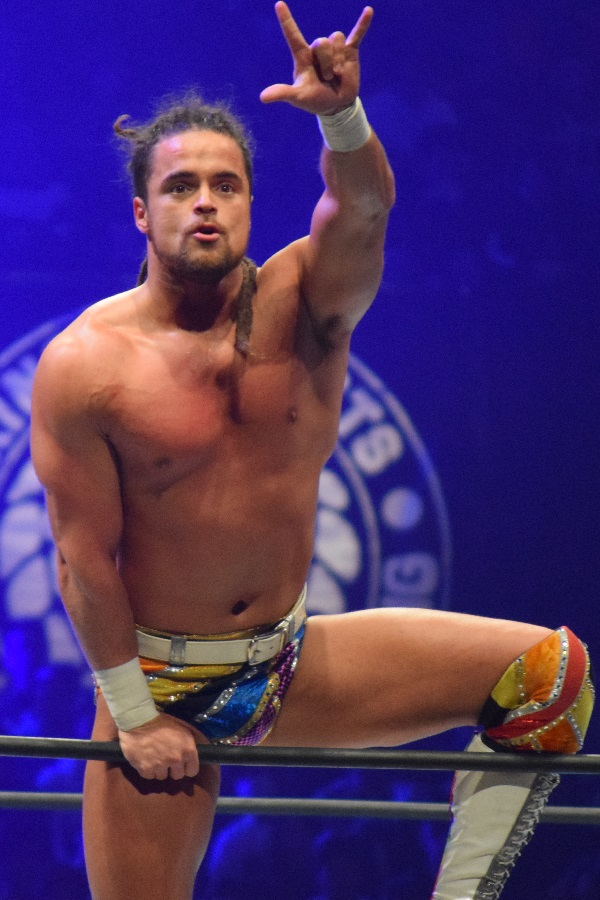
Juice Robinson, who challenged for the IWGP United States Heavyweight Championship in the main event of Destruction in Kobe

Destruction in Kobe would be headlined by Kenny Omega defending the IWGP United States Heavyweight Championship against Juice Robinson. This match also stemmed from the 2017 G1 Climax, where Robinson picked up a win over Omega, asking for a shot at his IWGP United States Heavyweight Championship in a post-match interview. With Omega having won the tournament on July 2 to become the inaugural IWGP United States Heavyweight Champion, this match would mark the first-ever defense of the title. Omega was scheduled to participate in the entire tour, but on September 6, it was announced that he had suffered a knee injury and was pulled from shows between September 7 and 22. He was replaced by the debuting Leo Tonga, the youngest brother of Tama Tonga and Tanga Loa. Several matches on the Kobe card were changed following events that took place at the Hiroshima show.

In addition to these title matches, all three shows would also feature a three-way tag team match for the IWGP Tag Team Championship with War Machine (Hanson and Raymond Rowe) taking on Killer Elite Squad (Davey Boy Smith Jr. and Lance Archer) and Guerrillas of Destiny (Tama Tonga and Tanga Loa). The first two matches would take place under regular three-way rules, while the third match would be contested under tornado tag team match rules. After successfully defending the title against Bullet Club's Cody and Hangman Page on August 13, War Machine were confronted and challenged to a title rematch by Guerrillas of Destiny. However, before they could respond, both teams were attacked by the Killer Elite Squad. This marked a return for K.E.S., who had not been seen together since the previous February, when Archer was sidelined with a lumbar disc herniation.

== Reception ==
Destruction in Fukushima

Bryan Rose of the Wrestling Observer Newsletter wrote that Destruction in Fukushima was "one of the weaker cards New Japan has put out this year, topped by a main event that was one of the worst New Japan main events in I don't know how long". Larry Csonka of 411Mania had similar sentiments, calling the show "extremely disappointing" and "possibly the laziest, most lifeless show the promotion has put on all year". He rated the main event a "dud", calling it "an embarrassment". Dave Meltzer, also of the Wrestling Observer Newsletter, wrote that fan response to the show had been "very negative, by far the worst of any major show for the company this year".

Destruction in Hiroshima

The show was better received than its predecessor. Csonka wrote that Destruction in Hiroshima "wasn't a great show, but it was closer to the company getting back to form" after the Fukushima show. Rose wrote that the Hiroshima show exceeded the Fukushima show "pretty much in every way".

Destruction in Kobe

Rose called the show "just there", deeming everything but the two title matches and the match between Beretta and Yujiro Takahashi "skippable". Rose praised the main event of the show as "fantastic". Csonka rated the show "good". While being down on the first three matches, he praised the main event as a "must see".

== Results ==
=== Destruction in Fukushima ===
No.	Results	Stipulations	Times
1	Hirai Kawato and Yuji Nagata defeated Manabu Nakanishi and Shota Umino	Tag team match	05:47
2	Chaos (Hirooki Goto and Yoshi-Hashi) defeated Monster Rage (Katsuya Kitamura and Tomoyuki Oka)	Tag team match	07:35
3	Bullet Club (Chase Owens and Yujiro Takahashi) defeated Chaos (Beretta and Jado)	Tag team match	07:36
4	Taguchi Japan (David Finlay and Juice Robinson) defeated Bullet Club (Bad Luck Fale and Leo Tonga)	Tag team match	05:04
5	Taguchi Japan (Hiroshi Tanahashi, Kushida, Ricochet, Ryusuke Taguchi and Togi Makabe) defeated Suzuki-gun (El Desperado, Taichi, Taka Michinoku, Takashi Iizuka and Yoshinobu Kanemaru)	Ten-man tag team match	10:40
6	War Machine (Hanson and Raymond Rowe) (c) defeated Guerrillas of Destiny (Tama Tonga and Tanga Loa) and Killer Elite Squad (Davey Boy Smith Jr. and Lance Archer)	Three-way tag team match for the IWGP Tag Team Championship	11:09
7	Los Ingobernables de Japón (Hiromu Takahashi and Tetsuya Naito) defeated Chaos (Tomohiro Ishii and Will Ospreay)	Tag team match	12:04
8	Los Ingobernables de Japón (Bushi, Evil and Sanada) (c) defeated Chaos (Kazuchika Okada, Rocky Romero and Toru Yano) (with Gedo)	Six-man tag team match for the NEVER Openweight 6-Man Tag Team Championship	14:00
9	Minoru Suzuki (c) (with El Desperado, Taichi, Taka Michinoku and Yoshinobu Kanemaru) defeated Michael Elgin (with Hiroshi Tanahashi, Kushida, Ricochet and Ryusuke Taguchi)	Lumberjack deathmatch for the NEVER Openweight Championship	19:07
(c) / – the champion(s) heading into the match

=== Destruction in Hiroshima ===
No.	Results	Stipulations	Times
1	Chaos (Hirooki Goto, Jado and Yoshi-Hashi) defeated Hiroyoshi Tenzan, Jyushin Thunder Liger and Tiger Mask	Six-man tag team match	07:20
2	Taguchi Japan (David Finlay and Juice Robinson) defeated Bullet Club (Bad Luck Fale and Leo Tonga)	Tag team match	04:32
3	Roppongi Vice (Beretta and Rocky Romero) defeated Bullet Club (Chase Owens and Yujiro Takahashi) (with Pieter)	Tag team match	06:55
4	Kota Ibushi, Michael Elgin and Togi Makabe defeated Suzuki-gun (Minoru Suzuki, Taka Michinoku and Takashi Iizuka)	Six-man tag team match	08:09
5	Funky Future (Ricochet and Ryusuke Taguchi) (c) defeated Suzuki-gun (Taichi and Yoshinobu Kanemaru)	Tag team match for the IWGP Junior Heavyweight Tag Team Championship	15:41
6	War Machine (Hanson and Raymond Rowe) (c) defeated Guerrillas of Destiny (Tama Tonga and Tanga Loa) and Killer Elite Squad (Davey Boy Smith Jr. and Lance Archer)	Three-way tag team match for the IWGP Tag Team Championship	11:05
7	Los Ingobernables de Japón (Bushi, Evil, Hiromu Takahashi, Sanada and Tetsuya Naito) defeated Chaos (Gedo, Kazuchika Okada, Tomohiro Ishii, Toru Yano and Will Ospreay)	Ten-man tag team match	12:17
8	Kushida (c) defeated El Desperado (with Taka Michinoku)	Singles match for the IWGP Junior Heavyweight Championship	16:56
9	Hiroshi Tanahashi (c) defeated Zack Sabre Jr. (with Taka Michinoku)	Singles match for the IWGP Intercontinental Championship	30:13
(c) / – the champion(s) heading into the match

=== Destruction in Kobe ===
No.	Results	Stipulations	Times
1	Hirai Kawato and Hiroyoshi Tenzan defeated Monster Rage (Katsuya Kitamura and Tomoyuki Oka)	Tag team match	05:42
2	Jyushin Thunder Liger, Ricochet, Ryusuke Taguchi, Tiger Mask and Togi Makabe defeated Suzuki-gun (El Desperado, Taichi, Taka Michinoku, Takashi Iizuka and Yoshinobu Kanemaru)	Ten-man tag team match	07:17
3	Chaos (Hirooki Goto and Yoshi-Hashi) defeated Bullet Club (Bad Luck Fale and Chase Owens)	Tag team match	05:41
4	Beretta defeated Yujiro Takahashi (with Pieter)	Singles match	13:21
5	Killer Elite Squad (Davey Boy Smith Jr. and Lance Archer) defeated War Machine (Hanson and Raymond Rowe) (c) and Guerrillas of Destiny (Tama Tonga and Tanga Loa)	Three-way tornado tag team match for the IWGP Tag Team Championship	13:34
6	Hiroshi Tanahashi and Michael Elgin defeated David Finlay and Kota Ibushi	Tag team match	12:01
7	Chaos (Rocky Romero, Tomohiro Ishii and Toru Yano) defeated Los Ingobernables de Japón (Bushi, Sanada and Tetsuya Naito)	Six-man tag team match	11:56
8	Chaos (Kazuchika Okada and Will Ospreay) (with Gedo) defeated Los Ingobernables de Japón (Evil and Hiromu Takahashi)	Tag team match	12:39
9	Kenny Omega (c) defeated Juice Robinson	Singles match for the IWGP United States Heavyweight Championship	32:55
(c) / – the champion(s) heading into the match
