= King of Pro-Wrestling (2024) =

2024 New Japan Pro-Wrestling event

- Promotional poster
- Promotion: New Japan Pro-Wrestling
- Date: October 14, 2024
- City: Tokyo, Japan
- Venue: Ryōgoku Kokugikan
- Attendance: 6,211

Event chronology
← Previous; Destruction in Kobe	Next → Royal Quest IV

King of Pro-Wrestling chronology
← Previous; 2019	Next → 2025

King of Pro-Wrestling (2024) was a professional wrestling event promoted by New Japan Pro-Wrestling (NJPW). It took place on October 14, 2024, at the Ryōgoku Kokugikan in Tokyo, Japan. It was the ninth event under the King of Pro-Wrestling name.

== Production ==
=== Background ===
This will be the first King of Pro-Wrestling event since 2019. The event will mark Hiroshi Tanahashi's 25th anniversary which he debuted in October 1999.

=== Storylines ===
King of Pro-Wrestling featured professional wrestling matches that involved different wrestlers from pre-existing scripted feuds and storylines. Wrestlers portrayed villains, heroes, or less distinguishable characters in the scripted events that built tension and culminated in a wrestling match or series of matches.

On August 18, 2024, Zack Sabre Jr. defeated Yota Tsuji in the G1 Climax 34 finals to win the tournament. After the match Sabre declared that he would challenge for the IWGP World Heavyweight Championship at King of Pro-Wrestling instead; usually the winner of the G1 Climax would receive an IWGP World Heavyweight Championship match at Wrestle Kingdom. Zack will face Tetsuya Naito for the IWGP World Heavyweight Championship after Naito successfully defended his title against Great-O-Khan at Destruction in Kobe.

=== Event ===
The event started with the singles confrontation between Consejo Mundial De Lucha Libre (CMLL)'s Místico and Hiromu Takahashi, solded with the victory of the latter. The second bout saw Kevin Knight and Kushida defeating Clark Connors and Drilla Moloney to win the IWGP Junior Heavyweight Tag Team Championship, ending the latter team's reign at 253 days and three successful defenses. Next up, Mikey Nicholls and Shane Haste defeated Bad Luck Fale and Caveman Ugg to secure the first successful defense of the IWGP Tag Team Championship in that respective reign. After the bout concluded, Nicholls and haste received a title challenge from Henare and Great-O-Khan. The fourth bout saw Shingo Takagi defeating Ryohei Oiwa to secure the first successful defense of the NEVER Openweight Championship in that respective reign. Next up, Ren Narita defeated reigning champion Jeff Cobb and Yota Tsuji to win the NJPW World Television Championship, ending Cobb's reign at 164 days and three defenses. In the sixth bout, Hiroshi Tanahashi, Shota Umino and El Phantasmo picked up a win over Evil, Yujiro Takahashi and Yoshinobu Kanemaru in six-man tag team action. After the bout concluded, Tanahashi announced that he will be retiring from professional wrestling at Wrestle Kingdom 20 on January 4, 2026. In the seventh bout, Douki defeated Sho in just 14 seconds to secure the third consecutive defense of the IWGP Junior Heavyweight Championship. Sho unmasked Douki before getting sprayed by the latter with a red mist. In the semi main event, David Finlay defeated Hirooki Goto to secure the third consecutive defense of the IWGP Global Heavyweight Championship in that respective reign. After the bout concluded, Finlay nominated Yuya Uemura as his next challenger, however, the one to respond him instead was Taichi who settled himself as the next challenger.

In the main event, G1 Climax 34 winner Zack Sabre Jr. defeated Tetsuya Naito to win the IWGP World Heavyweight Championship, ending the latter's reign at 106 days and one successful defense. After the bout concluded, Sabre received a title challenge from Sanada as they converted their match from Royal Quest IV which was initially scheduled to be a singles bout into a match disputed for the IWGP Heavyweight title itself. Afterwards, Shingo Takagi and Shota Umino also demanded a title shot from Sabre who stated that they will all receive their title shots one after another.

== Results ==
No.	Results	Stipulations	Times
1	Hiromu Takahashi defeated Místico by submission	Singles match	8:01
2	Intergalactic Jet Setters (Kevin Knight and Kushida) defeated Bullet Club War Dogs (Clark Connors and Drilla Moloney) (c) by pinfall	Tag team match for the IWGP Junior Heavyweight Tag Team Championship	12:21
3	TMDK (Mikey Nicholls and Shane Haste) (c) defeated The Rogue Army (Bad Luck Fale and Caveman Ugg) by pinfall	Tag team match for the IWGP Tag Team Championship	7:49
4	Shingo Takagi (c) defeated Ryohei Oiwa by pinfall	Singles match for the NEVER Openweight Championship	10:42
5	Ren Narita defeated Jeff Cobb (c) and Yota Tsuji by pinfall	Three-way match for the NJPW World Television Championship	12:27
6	Hiroshi Tanahashi, Shota Umino and El Phantasmo (with Jado) defeated House of Torture (Evil, Yujiro Takahashi and Yoshinobu Kanemaru) (with Dick Togo) by pinfall	Six-man tag team match	9:05
7	Douki (c) defeated Sho by pinfall	Singles match for the IWGP Junior Heavyweight Championship	0:14
8	David Finlay (c) (with Gedo) defeated Hirooki Goto by pinfall	Singles match for the IWGP Global Heavyweight Championship	16:58
9	Zack Sabre Jr. defeated Tetsuya Naito (c) by pinfall	Singles match for the IWGP World Heavyweight Championship	24:41
(c) / – the champion(s) heading into the match

== See also ==
- 2024 in professional wrestling
- List of NJPW major events
