= King of Pro-Wrestling (2012) =

- Promotional poster for the event, featuring Togi Makabe, Shinsuke Nakamura, Hiroshi Tanahashi and Kazuchika Okada
- Promotion: New Japan Pro-Wrestling
- Date: October 8, 2012
- City: Tokyo, Japan
- Venue: Ryōgoku Kokugikan
- Attendance: 9,000

Pay-per-view chronology
← Previous; Destruction	Next → Power Struggle

King of Pro-Wrestling chronology
← Previous; First	Next → 2013

New Japan Pro-Wrestling events chronology
← Previous; Destruction	Next → Power Struggle

King of Pro-Wrestling (2012) was a professional wrestling pay-per-view (PPV) event promoted by New Japan Pro-Wrestling (NJPW). The event took place on October 8, 2012, in Tokyo at Ryōgoku Kokugikan. The event featured nine matches, five of which were contested for championships.

It was the first event under the King of Pro-Wrestling name, and the first NJPW PPV that could be bought outside Japan through Ustream.

== Storylines ==
King of Pro-Wrestling featured nine professional wrestling matches that involved different wrestlers from pre-existing scripted feuds and storylines. Wrestlers portrayed villains, heroes, or less distinguishable characters in the scripted events that built tension and culminated in a wrestling match or series of matches.

== Event ==
The opening match saw Manabu Nakanishi return from a back injury and wrestle his first match since June 2011. The second match saw Forever Hooligans (Alex Koslov and Rocky Romero) make their successful defense of the IWGP Junior Heavyweight Tag Team Championship against the Time Splitters (Alex Shelley and Kushida). The event featured two title switches; in the first Low Ki defeated Kota Ibushi to win the IWGP Junior Heavyweight Championship for the third time and end Ibushi's two-month-long reign, while in the second, K.E.S. (Davey Boy Smith Jr. and Lance Archer) defeated Tencozy (Hiroyoshi Tenzan and Satoshi Kojima) to win the IWGP Tag Team Championship for the first time. The event also featured a grudge match between former No Limit tag team partners Tetsuya Naito and Yujiro Takahashi, which was used as a way to write off Naito, who had suffered a knee injury and would have to undergo a reconstructive knee surgery. He would remain sidelined until Dominion 6.22 in June 2013. The event concluded with Shinsuke Nakamura making his second successful defense of the IWGP Intercontinental Championship against Hirooki Goto and Hiroshi Tanahashi his fourth successful defense of the IWGP Heavyweight Championship against Minoru Suzuki.

== Reception ==
The main event between Tanahashi and Suzuki was later given a five-star rating by sports journalist Dave Meltzer, making it the first NJPW match in nearly twelve years to receive the rating. At the end of the year, readers of Meltzer's Wrestling Observer Newsletter voted the match the 2012 Match of the Year, while also naming the event as a whole the Best Major Wrestling Show of the year.

== Results ==
No.	Results	Stipulations	Times
1	Chaos (Takashi Iizuka, Tomohiro Ishii and Toru Yano) defeated Muscle Orchestra (Manabu Nakanishi and Strong Man) and Yuji Nagata	Six-man tag team match	11:29
2	Forever Hooligans (Alex Koslov and Rocky Romero) (c) defeated Time Splitters (Alex Shelley and Kushida)	Tag team match for the IWGP Junior Heavyweight Tag Team Championship	14:55
3	Low Ki defeated Kota Ibushi (c)	Singles match for the IWGP Junior Heavyweight Championship	17:05
4	K.E.S. (Davey Boy Smith Jr. and Lance Archer) (with Taka Michinoku) defeated Tencozy (Hiroyoshi Tenzan and Satoshi Kojima) (c)	Tag team match for the IWGP Tag Team Championship	12:47
5	Yujiro Takahashi defeated Tetsuya Naito	Singles match	05:41
6	Laughter7 (Katsuyori Shibata and Kazushi Sakuraba) defeated Always Hypers (Togi Makabe and Wataru Inoue)	Tag team match	07:10
7	Kazuchika Okada (with Gedo) defeated Karl Anderson	Singles match for the Tokyo Dome IWGP Heavyweight Championship challenge rights certificate	16:26
8	Shinsuke Nakamura (c) defeated Hirooki Goto	Singles match for the IWGP Intercontinental Championship	15:12
9	Hiroshi Tanahashi (c) defeated Minoru Suzuki	Singles match for the IWGP Heavyweight Championship	29:22
(c) / – the champion(s) heading into the match
