= King of Pro-Wrestling (2018) =

- Promotion: New Japan Pro-Wrestling
- Date: October 8, 2018
- City: Tokyo, Japan
- Venue: Ryōgoku Kokugikan
- Attendance: 9,152

Event chronology
← Previous; New Japan Road: Ganbaro! Uonuma; Fighting Spirit Unleashed	Next → Road to Power Struggle; Global Wars UK 2018

King of Pro-Wrestling chronology
← Previous; 2017	Next → 2019

King of Pro-Wrestling was a professional wrestling event promoted by New Japan Pro-Wrestling. The event took place on October 8, 2018 at the Ryōgoku Kokugikan in Tokyo. This was the seventh event under the King of Pro-Wrestling branding.

== Storylines ==
King of Pro-Wrestling will feature professional wrestling matches that involve different wrestlers from pre-existing scripted feuds and storylines. Wrestlers portrayed villains, heroes, or less distinguishable characters in the scripted events that built tension and culminated in a wrestling match or series of matches.

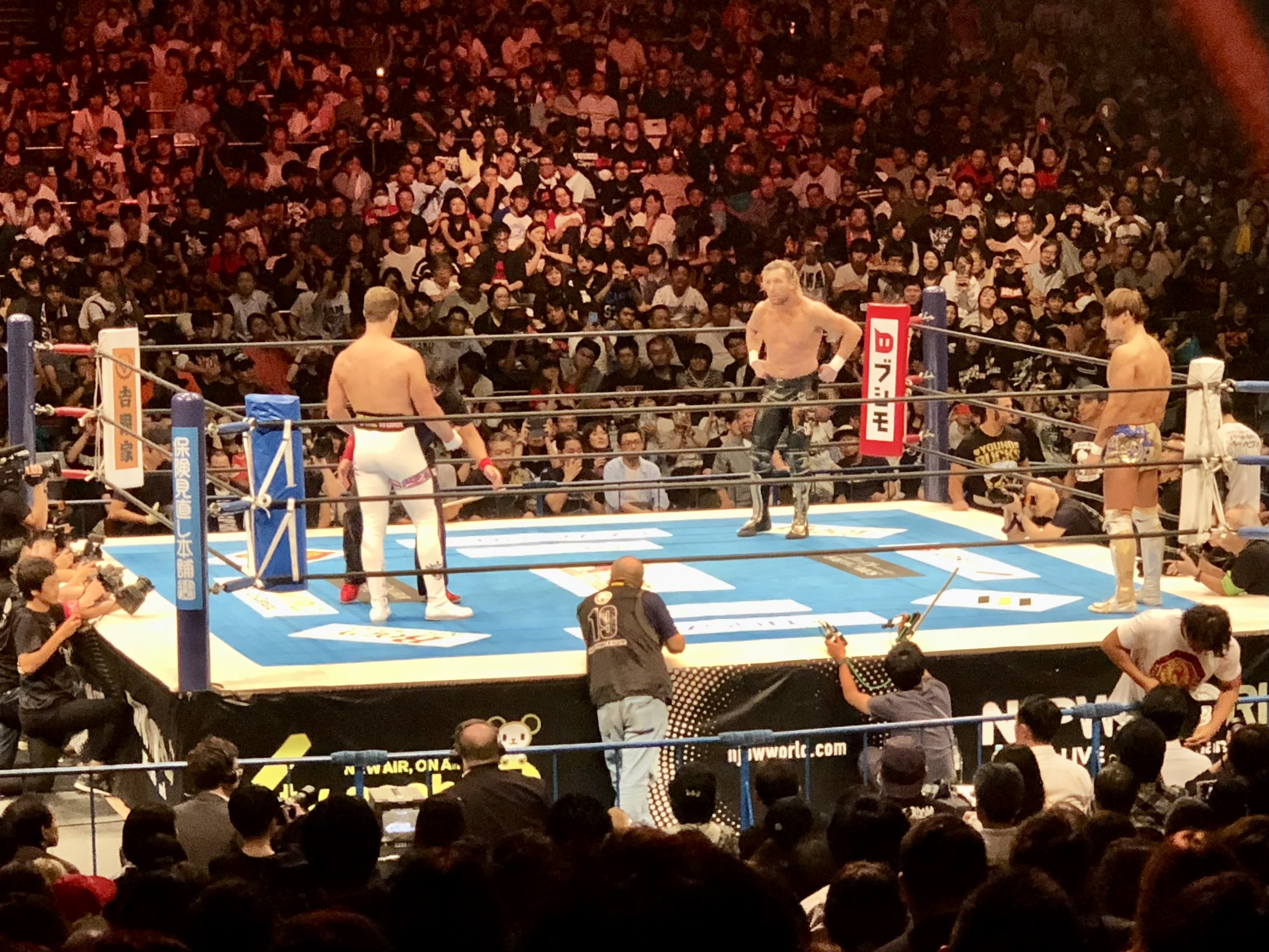
Kenny Omega vs. Cody vs. Kota Ibushi at King of Pro-Wrestling (2018)

The main event of King of Pro-Wrestling will be a three-way match for the IWGP Heavyweight Championship. At Fighting Spirit Unleashed, Kenny Omega decided his next opponent for the championship will be Kota Ibushi, his tag partner in the Golden☆Lovers. This is due to Ibushi beating Omega in the 2018 G1 Climax. Immediately after the announcement, IWGP United States Champion and Bullet Club stablemate Cody stated he wanted to help both of them out and lessen the burden on them and asked for a triple threat match involving him. Omega granted his wish. This is only the third time in NJPW history that the IWGP Heavyweight Championship will be defended in a three-way match.

At the 2018 G1 Climax, Hiroshi Tanahashi won the Tokyo Dome IWGP Heavyweight Championship challenge rights certificate for the right to challenge for the IWGP Heavyweight Championship at Wrestle Kingdom 13. Tanahashi successfully defended the certificate against Kazuchika Okada at Destruction in Kobe. However, Chaos stablemate Jay White with the help of Okada's former manager Gedo, attacked both Tanahashi and Okada after the match; turning heel. Gedo claimed that the certificate belongs to White not Tanahashi nor Okada as White defeated both of them at the G1 Climax, setting up a match between Tanahasi and White for the Tokyo Dome IWGP Heavyweight Championship challenge rights certificate at King of Pro-Wrestling. On October 2, Chaos member Will Ospreay, tweeted the names of current Chaos members; White and Gedo's names were not included, indicating that they have left the stable.

At G1 Special in San Francisco Hiromu Takahashi successfully defended his IWGP Junior Heavyweight Championship against Dragon Lee. However, during the match, Hiromu injured his neck and was forced to relinquish the championship. The news led to NJPW announcing a four-man single-elimination tournament to crown a new champion. At Destruction in Kobe 2018, Kushida defeated Bushi, and at Fighting Spirit Unleashed, Marty Scurll defeated Will Ospreay. Kushida and Scurll will now face off at King of Pro-Wrestling for the vacant IWGP Junior Heavyweight Championship.

On October 1, Los Ingobernables de Japón released a video on New Japan's YouTube page. In it, Tetsuya Naito made it clear that the faction will wait for member Hiromu Takahashi to return. But, Naito made a surprise announcement, saying "5, not 4 of us will wait for Hiromu's return" and "On October 8, we will introduce our new 'pareja'", indicating that a new member of Los Ingobernables de Japón will debut at King of Pro-Wrestling.

Other matches at King of Pro-Wrestling include an IWGP Junior Heavyweight Tag Team Championship match between Suzuki-gun (El Desperado and Yoshinobu Kanemaru) and the team of Jyushin Thunder Liger and Tiger Mask IV and a singles match between Suzuki-gun's Zack Sabre Jr. and Los Ingobernables de Japón's EVIL.

== Results ==
No.	Results	Stipulations	Times
1	Suzuki-gun (El Desperado and Yoshinobu Kanemaru) (c) defeated Jyushin Thunder Liger and Tiger Mask	Tag team match for the IWGP Junior Heavyweight Tag Team Championship	9:51
2	Great Bash Heel (Togi Makabe and Tomoaki Honma) defeated Taguchi Japan (Juice Robinson and Toa Henare)	Tag team match	10:20
3	Bullet Club OG (Bad Luck Fale, Tama Tonga, Tanga Loa and Taiji Ishimori) defeated Bullet Club Elite (Matt Jackson, Nick Jackson, Hangman Page and Chase Owens)	Eight-man tag team match	12:06
4	Chaos (Tomohiro Ishii, Hirooki Goto and Will Ospreay) defeated Suzuki-gun (Minoru Suzuki, Taichi and Takashi Iizuka)	Six-man tag team match	12:10
5	Los Ingobernables de Japón (Tetsuya Naito, Sanada, Bushi and Shingo Takagi) defeated Chaos (Kazuchika Okada, Toru Yano, Yoh and Sho)	Eight-man tag team match	9:30
6	Evil vs. Zack Sabre Jr. ended in a no contest	Singles match	—
7	Kushida defeated Marty Scurll	Singles match for the vacant IWGP Junior Heavyweight Championship	18:33
8	Hiroshi Tanahashi defeated Jay White (with Gedo)	Singles match for the Tokyo Dome IWGP Heavyweight Championship challenge rights certificate	20:40
9	Kenny Omega (c) defeated Cody and Kota Ibushi	Three-way match for the IWGP Heavyweight Championship	34:13
(c) / – the champion(s) heading into the match
