= King of Pro-Wrestling =

Event promoted by the New Japan Pro-Wrestling

- NJPW King of Pro-Wrestling logo
- Promotions: New Japan Pro-Wrestling
- First event: King of Pro-Wrestling (2012)

King of Pro-Wrestling is an annual professional wrestling event promoted by New Japan Pro-Wrestling (NJPW). The event has been held every October since 2012 and aired domestically as a pay-per-view (PPV). The event also aired internationally as an internet pay-per-view (iPPV) until 2015, when it was moved to NJPW's worldwide internet streaming site, NJPW World.

King of Pro-Wrestling was created by Bushiroad, a card game company, which had bought NJPW in January 2012. The event became NJPW's main show of October, a spot previously held by Destruction, which was instead moved back to September. The event takes place annually on the second Monday of October, the day of the Japanese public holiday known as the Health and Sports Day (体育の日, Taiiku no hi). Held annually at Tokyo's Ryōgoku Kokugikan, the event has been nicknamed "Autumn Showdown at Ryōgoku" (秋の両国決戦, Aki no Ryōgoku Kessen) and is considered NJPW's biggest event between August's G1 Climax and the January 4 Tokyo Dome Show. Traditionally, King of Pro-Wrestling is main evented by the final defense of the IWGP Heavyweight Championship before the January 4 Tokyo Dome Show.

King of Pro-Wrestling is also the name of a collectible card game, created by Bushiroad.

== Events ==
#	Event	Date	City	Venue	Attendance	Main event	Ref(s)
1	King of Pro-Wrestling (2012)	October 8, 2012	Tokyo, Japan	Ryōgoku Kokugikan	9,000	Hiroshi Tanahashi (c) vs. Minoru Suzuki for the IWGP Heavyweight Championship	
2	King of Pro-Wrestling (2013)	October 14, 2013	Tokyo, Japan	Ryōgoku Kokugikan	9,000	Kazuchika Okada (c) vs. Hiroshi Tanahashi for the IWGP Heavyweight Championship	
3	King of Pro-Wrestling (2014)	October 13, 2014	Tokyo, Japan	Ryōgoku Kokugikan	9,100	A.J. Styles (c) vs. Hiroshi Tanahashi for the IWGP Heavyweight Championship	
4	King of Pro-Wrestling (2015)	October 12, 2015	Tokyo, Japan	Ryōgoku Kokugikan	8,302	Kazuchika Okada (c) vs. A.J. Styles for the IWGP Heavyweight Championship	
5	King of Pro-Wrestling (2016)	October 10, 2016	Tokyo, Japan	Ryōgoku Kokugikan	9,671	Kazuchika Okada (c) vs. Naomichi Marufuji for the IWGP Heavyweight Championship	
6	King of Pro-Wrestling (2017)	October 9, 2017	Tokyo, Japan	Ryōgoku Kokugikan	9,234	Kazuchika Okada (c) vs. Evil for the IWGP Heavyweight Championship	
7	King of Pro-Wrestling (2018)	October 8, 2018	Tokyo, Japan	Ryōgoku Kokugikan	9,152	Kenny Omega (c) vs. Kota Ibushi vs. Cody in a three-way match for the IWGP Heavyweight Championship	
8	King of Pro-Wrestling (2019)	October 14, 2019	Tokyo, Japan	Ryōgoku Kokugikan	9,573	Kazuchika Okada (c) vs. Sanada for the IWGP Heavyweight Championship	
9	King of Pro-Wrestling (2024)	October 14, 2024	Tokyo, Japan	Ryōgoku Kokugikan	6,211	Tetsuya Naito (c) vs. Zack Sabre Jr. for the IWGP World Heavyweight Championship	
10	King of Pro-Wrestling (2025)	October 13, 2025	Tokyo, Japan	Ryōgoku Kokugikan	5,372	Zack Sabre Jr. (c) vs. Konosuke Takeshita for the IWGP World Heavyweight Championship	
11	King of Pro-Wrestling (2026)	October 12, 2026	Tokyo, Japan	Ryōgoku Kokugikan	6,422	Yota Tsuji (c) vs. Ryohei Oiwa for the IWGP Heavyweight Championship	
(c) – refers to the champion(s) heading into the match

== See also ==
- List of New Japan Pro-Wrestling pay-per-view events
