= King of Pro-Wrestling (2025) =

2025 New Japan Pro-Wrestling event

- Promotional poster featuring various NJPW wrestlers.
- Promotion: New Japan Pro-Wrestling
- Date: October 13, 2025
- City: Tokyo, Japan
- Venue: Ryōgoku Kokugikan
- Attendance: 5,372

Event chronology
← Previous; Historic X-Over in Guangzhou	Next → Tanahashi Final Homecoming

King of Pro-Wrestling chronology
← Previous; 2024	Next → 2026

King of Pro-Wrestling (2025) was a professional wrestling event promoted by New Japan Pro-Wrestling (NJPW). It took place on October 13, 2025, at the Ryōgoku Kokugikan in Tokyo, Japan. It was the tenth event under the King of Pro-Wrestling name.

== Production ==
=== Storylines ===
King of Pro-Wrestling featured professional wrestling matches that will involve different wrestlers from pre-existing scripted feuds and storylines. Wrestlers portrayed villains, heroes, or less distinguishable characters in the scripted events that built tension and culminated in a wrestling match or series of matches.

=== Event ===
The event started with the confrontation between reigning champion Sareee and World Wonder Ring Stardom's Syuri for the IWGP Women's Championship which the latter won, ending Sareee's reign at 114 days and three defenses.

Next up, David Finlay, Taiji Ishimori and Clark Connors picked up a victory over Shingo Takagi, Hiromu Takahashi and Titán in six-man tag team competition. The third bout saw Drilla Moloney defeat Sanada in a No disqualification match. Next up, Hirooki Goto, Yoshi-Hashi and Yoh outmatched Ryohei Oiwa, Hartley Jackson and Kosei Fujita in six-man tag team competition. In the fifth bout, El Phantasmo wrestled Hiroshi Tanahashi into a time limit draw, thus securing the third consecutive defense of the NJPW World Television Championship in that respective reign. Next up, Evil defeated Boltin Oleg to win the NEVER Openweight Championship, ending the latter's reign at 120 days and two defenses.

In the seventh bout, Yuto-Ice and Oskar defeated Shota Umino and Yuya Uemura to secure the first defense of the IWGP Tag Team Championship in that respective reign. In the semi main event, Yota Tsuji defeated Gabe Kidd to win the IWGP Global Heavyweight Championship, ending the latter's reign at 120 days and two defenses. After the bout concluded, Tsuji was furtherly challenged by David Finlay.

In the main event, G1 Climax 35 winner Konosuke Takeshita defeated Zack Sabre Jr. to win the IWGP World Heavyweight Championship, ending the latter's reign at 106 days and two defenses. After the bout concluded, Takeshita was furtherly challenged by Hirooki Goto.

== Results ==
No.	Results	Stipulations	Times
1	Syuri defeated Sareee (c) by pinfall	Singles match for the IWGP Women's Championship	14:56
2	Bullet Club War Dogs (David Finlay, Taiji Ishimori and Clark Connors) (with Gedo) defeated Mushozoku (Shingo Takagi, Hiromu Takahashi and Titán) by pinfall	Six-man tag team match	7:58
3	Drilla Moloney defeated Sanada by pinfall	No disqualification, no countout match	13:37
4	Bishamon (Hirooki Goto and Yoshi-Hashi) and Yoh defeated TMDK (Ryohei Oiwa, Hartley Jackson and Kosei Fujita) by pinfall	Six-man tag team match	7:54
5	El Phantasmo (c) (with Jado) vs. Hiroshi Tanahashi ended in a time limit draw	Singles match for the NJPW World Television Championship	15:00
6	Evil (with Dick Togo and Don Fale) defeated Boltin Oleg (c) by pinfall	Singles match for the NEVER Openweight Championship	11:40
7	Knock Out Brothers (Yuto-Ice and Oskar) (c) defeated Shota Umino and Yuya Uemura by pinfall	Tag team match for the IWGP Tag Team Championship	14:40
8	Yota Tsuji defeated Gabe Kidd (c) by submission	Singles match for the IWGP Global Heavyweight Championship	24:13
9	Konosuke Takeshita defeated Zack Sabre Jr. (c) by pinfall	Singles match for the IWGP World Heavyweight Championship	31:16
(c) / – the champion(s) heading into the match
