= King of Pro-Wrestling (2026) =

2026 New Japan Pro-Wrestling event

- Promotion: New Japan Pro-Wrestling
- Date: October 12, 2026
- City: Tokyo, Japan
- Venue: Ryōgoku Kokugikan
- Attendance: 6,422

Event chronology
← Previous; Destruction in Kobe	Next → Super Junior Tag League

King of Pro-Wrestling chronology
← Previous; 2025	Next → —

King of Pro-Wrestling (2026) was a professional wrestling event promoted by New Japan Pro-Wrestling (NJPW). It was the eleventh King of Pro-Wrestling event and took place on October 12, 2026, at the Ryōgoku Kokugikan in Tokyo, Japan.

== Production ==
=== Storylines ===
King of Pro-Wrestling will feature professional wrestling matches that will involve different wrestlers from pre-existing scripted feuds and storylines. Wrestlers portrayed villains, heroes, or less distinguishable characters in the scripted events that built tension and culminated in a wrestling match or series of matches. It was the tenth event under the King of Pro-Wrestling name.

On August 16, 2026, at the G1 Climax finals, Ryohei Oiwa defeated Yuya Uemura in the finals to win the G1 tournament. After the match, Oiwa announced that he would challenge for the IWGP Heavyweight Championship at King of Pro-Wrestling. At Destruction in Kobe, the IWGP Heavyweight champion Yota Tsuji would defeat Hirooki Goto to retain the title; setting the match between Tsuji and Oiwa for the title at King of Pro-Wrestling.

At Dominion 6.14 in Osaka-jo Hall, Shota Umino won the IWGP Global Heavyweight Championship after defeating champion Andrade El Idolo and Drilla Moloney in a three-way match. Gabe Kidd attacked Umino after the match and would defeat him for the title weeks later. After the first day of the G1 Climax, Umino would pull out of the tournament due to injury and forfeit the rest of his matches; Umino would return during the Road to Destruction tour. At Destruction in Kobe, Kidd defeated Moloney to retain IWGP Global Heavyweight Championship and after the match, Kidd said that he wouldn't return to New Japan to defend his title until Wrestle Kingdom. Umino would come out to the ring and challenge Kidd for the title; Kidd attempted to attack him, but Umino countered his attack. NJPW made the match for King of Pro-Wrestling official soon after.

== Results ==
No.	Results	Stipulations	Times
1	Unbound Co. (Shingo Takagi and Daiki Nagai) defeated Goto Revolutionary Army (Hirooki Goto and Tatsuya Matsumoto) by pinfall	Tag team match	6:23
2	Yuya Uemura, Taichi and El Desperado defeated House of Torture (Sanada, Yujiro Takahashi, and Yoshinobu Kanemaru) by pinfall	Six-man tag team match	8:20
3	Hechicero and Boltin Oleg defeated TMDK (Zack Sabre Jr. and Hartley Jackson) by pinfall	Tag team match	7:02
4	Konosuke Takeshita and Toru Yano defeated House of Torture (Ren Narita and Shun Skywalker) (with Dick Togo) by pinfall	Tag team match	4:07
5	Unbound Co. (Yuto-Ice, Oskar, and Jeff Cobb) defeated United Empire (Will Ospreay, Henare, and Great-O-Khan) (c) (with Callum Newman, Francesco Akira, Jake Lee, Jakob Austin Young, and Zane Jay) by pinfall	Six-man tag team match for the NEVER Openweight 6-Man Tag Team Championship	17:29
6	Aaron Wolf (c) defeated Kosei Fujita by pinfall	Singles match for the NEVER Openweight Championship	14:47
7	Gabe Kidd (c) defeated Shota Umino by pinfall	Singles match for the IWGP Global Heavyweight Championship	22:25
8	Yoh (c) defeated Robbie Eagles by pinfall	Singles match for the IWGP Junior Heavyweight Championship	13:02
9	Yota Tsuji (c) defeated Ryohei Oiwa by pinfall	Singles match for the IWGP Heavyweight Championship	35:08
(c) / – the champion(s) heading into the match
