= Forever Hooligans =

Professional wrestling tag team

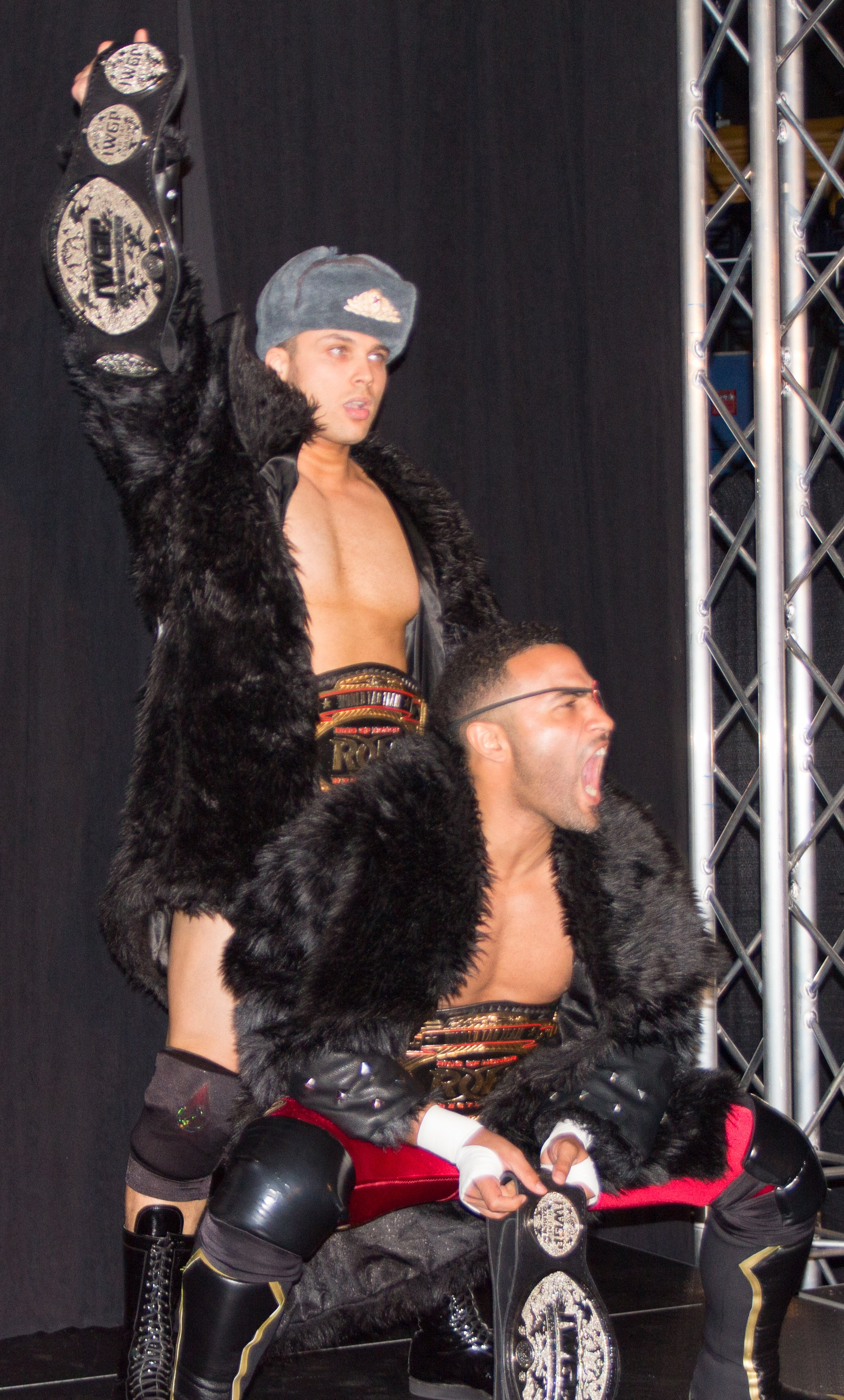
- Koslov (left) and Romero with both the IWGP Junior Heavyweight Tag Team Championship and ROH World Tag Team Championship belts

Tag team
- Members: Alex Koslov; Rocky Romero
- Name: Forever Hooligans
- Billed heights: 5 ft 9 in (1.75 m) – Koslov; 5 ft 7 in (1.70 m) – Romero
- Combined billed weight: 362 lb (164 kg)
- Debut: 2012
- Disbanded: 2015

Forever Hooligans was a professional wrestling tag team consisting of Alex Koslov and Rocky Romero. They are best known for working for New Japan Pro-Wrestling, where they are former two-time IWGP Jr. Heavyweight Tag Team Champions. They have also worked for Ring of Honor, where they are former ROH World Tag Team Champions.

== Career ==
=== New Japan Pro-Wrestling ===
Alex Koslov returned to New Japan on July 7, 2012, now representing the promotion's top villainous stable, Chaos, as a member of which he also reunited with former AAA partner Rocky Romero, with the two dubbing their tag team "Forever Hooligans". On July 22, Koslov and Romero defeated Jyushin Thunder Liger and Tiger Mask to win the IWGP Junior Heavyweight Tag Team Championship. Koslov and Romero made their first successful title defense on August 26 at a Sacramento Wrestling Federation (SWF) event in Gridley, California, defeating the team of A.J. Kirsch and Alex Shelley. Forever Hooligans made their second successful title defense on October 8 at King of Pro-Wrestling, defeating the Time Splitters (Alex Shelley and Kushida). On October 21, Forever Hooligans entered the 2012 Super Jr. Tag Tournament, defeating Jyushin Thunder Liger and Tiger Mask IV in their first round match. On November 2, Koslov and Romero were eliminated from the tournament in the semifinals by Apollo 55 (Prince Devitt and Ryusuke Taguchi). On November 11 at Power Struggle, Forever Hooligans lost the IWGP Junior Heavyweight Tag Team Championship to the winners of the Super Jr. Tag Tournament, the Time Splitters, ending their reign at 112 days. On February 10 at The New Beginning, Hooligans unsuccessfully challenged the Time Splitters for the IWGP Junior Heavyweight Tag Team Championship. On May 3 at Wrestling Dontaku 2013, Koslov and Romero regained the IWGP Junior Heavyweight Tag Team Championship from the Time Splitters. Koslov and Romero made their first successful defense of the IWGP Junior Heavyweight Tag Team Championship on June 22 at Dominion 6.22 in a rematch with the Time Splitters. Koslov and Romero then got involved in Chaos' rivalry with the Suzuki-gun stable, which led to their second successful title defense on July 20 against Taichi and Taka Michinoku. The Forever Hooligans lost the title to Taichi and Michinoku in a rematch on October 14 at King of Pro-Wrestling. On November 6, 2013, The Forever Hooligans lost to The Young Bucks in the finals of the 2013 Super Jr. Tag Tournament. On May 10, 2014 at Global Wars, a special event co-produced by NJPW and Ring of Honor (ROH) in Toronto, Forever Hooligans received another title shot for the IWGP Junior Heavyweight Tag Team Championships being defeated by The Young Bucks in a three-way match, also involving Time Splitters. On January 9, 2015, Koslov announced he was taking an "indefinite sabbatical" from professional wrestling.

=== Ring of Honor ===
Forever Hooligans made their debut for Ring of Honor at the ROH 11th Anniversary Show PPV, where they were defeated by the American Wolves (Davey Richards and Eddie Edwards). The next day, they were defeated by reDRagon (Bobby Fish and Kyle O'Reilly) for the ROH World Tag Team Championship. On July 27, 2013, Koslov and Romero returned to ROH and defeated reDRagon to become the new ROH World Tag Team Champions. They lost the title to The American Wolves in their first defense on August 3. At Manhattan Mayhem V, they defeated The Young Bucks in a Dream Match. On September 20 at Death Before Dishonor XI, The Forever Hooligans successfully defended the IWGP Junior Heavyweight Tag Team Championship against the American Wolves. At the following day's tapings of Ring of Honor Wrestling, Koslov and Romero unsuccessfully challenged reDRagon for the ROH World Tag Team Championship in a three-way match, which also included C&C Wrestle Factory (Caprice Coleman and Cedric Alexander).

=== Pro Wrestling Guerrilla ===
On August 9, 2013, Forever Hooligans made their debut for Pro Wrestling Guerrilla (PWG) at the promotion's tenth anniversary event, where they defeated the RockNES Monsters (Johnny Goodtime and Johnny Yuma). On August 30, 2013, Forever Hooligans and TJ Perkins were defeated by Adam Cole and The Young Bucks.

=== Independent circuit ===
On November 29, 2013, Forever Hooligans defeated Project Ego (Kris Travis and Martin Kirby) at RPW New Territory. On November 30, 2013, Forever Hooligans unsuccessfully challenged Hot And Spicy (Axel Dieter Jr. & Da Mack) for the wXw World Tag Team Championship at wXw 13th Anniversary Tour Finale. On December 7, 2013, Forever Hooligans competed in a one night tournament for the WCA Golden State Tag Team Championships defeating The Ballard Brothers (Shane Ballard and Shannon Ballard) in the first round and faced Team APW (Oliver John and Timothy Thatcher) in the tournament finals which ended in a no contest.

From January 24 to 25, 2015, Forever Hooligans participated in the Alternative Wrestling Show's Race for the Ring Tag Team Tournament. They were defeated in the finals by the ASW Tag team Champions PPRay (Peter Avalon and Ray Rosas). It was Koslov's final wrestling match.

=== New Japan Pro Wrestling Reunion ===
On October 28, 2022 on New Japan Pro Wrestling PPV Rumble on 44th Street, Alex Koslov came back to wrestle one more time with fellow tag team partner Rocky Romero in a briefly reunion of the Forever Hooligans in a losing effort against The DKC and Kevin Knight, ending a 7-Year absence of Koslov from a ring of professional wrestling.

== Championships and accomplishments ==
- New Japan Pro-Wrestling
  - IWGP Junior Heavyweight Tag Team Championship (2 times)
- Ring of Honor
  - ROH World Tag Team Championship (1 time)
