= Time Splitters (professional wrestling) =

Professional wrestling tag team

Tag team
- Name(s): Time Splitters; Kushida and Alex Shelley; Time Machine; Time Splitters V2; TV2
- Former members: Alex Shelley; Kushida; Chris Sabin; Nick Wayne
- Debut: August 26, 2012
- Years active: 2012–2015; 2020; 2022–2024; 2026

Time Splitters, also known as Time Machine or Time Splitters V2, is a professional wrestling tag team in New Japan Pro-Wrestling (NJPW).

Originally formed as Time Splitters in 2012 in NJPW, Kushida and Alex Shelley would go on to become two-time IWGP Junior Heavyweight Tag Team Champions and winning the 2012 Super Jr. Tag Tournament, while Kushida became a three-time IWGP Junior Heavyweight Champion and winner of the 2015 Best of the Super Juniors during the team's existence. The team disbanded in 2015 after Shelley departed NJPW. The team would have sproadic reuinions in WWE in 2020, and in Impact Wrestling from 2022 to 2024, where the team would rebrand to Time Machine after adding Chris Sabin. The team was revived for a third time in 2026 with Kushida and Nick Wayne as Time Splitters V2 or TV2.

== History ==
=== New Japan Pro-Wrestling (2012–2015) ===
==== Formation and Tag Team Champions (2012–2013) ====
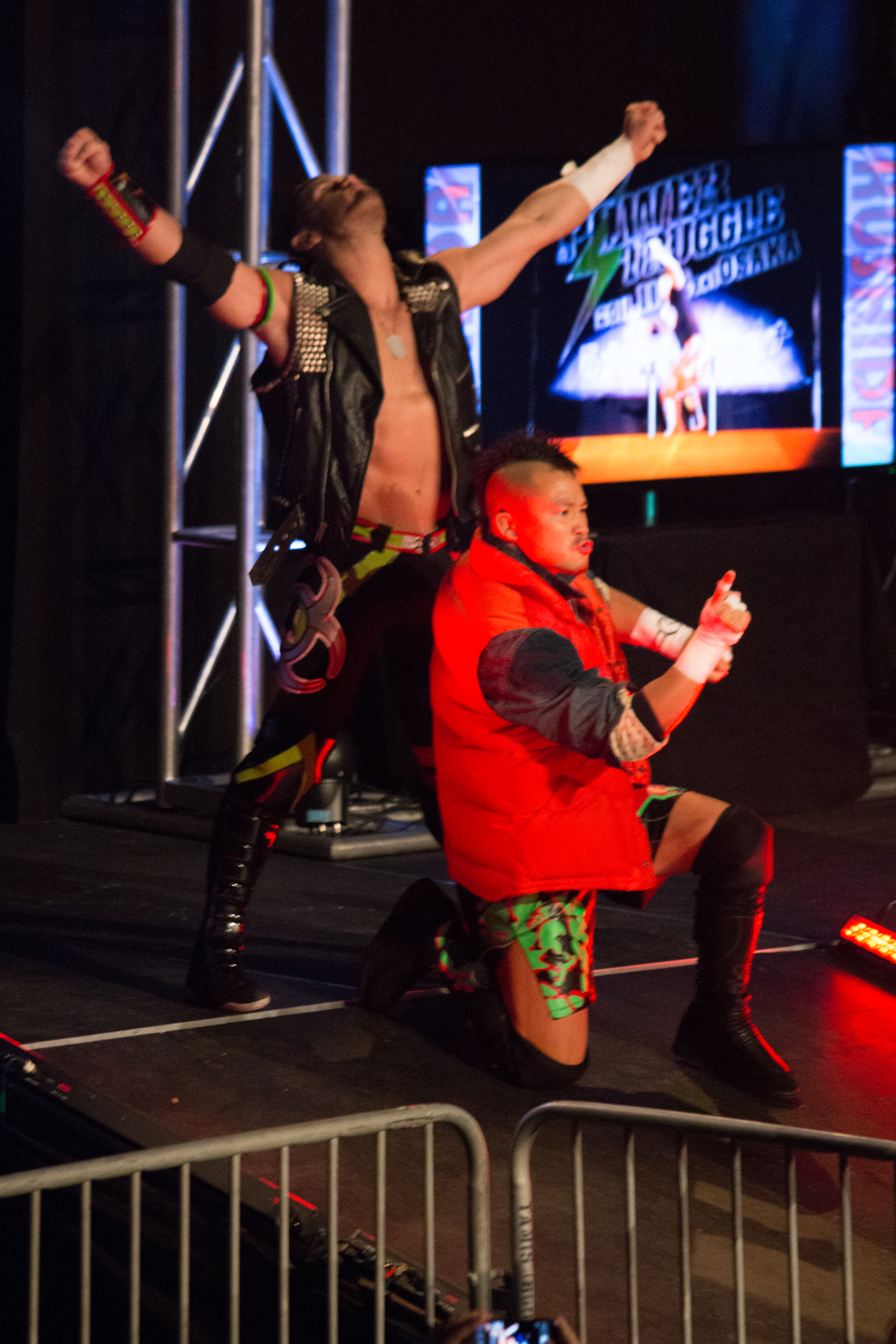
The original Time Splitters making their entrance in May 2014

On August 26, 2012, Alex Shelley and A.J. Kirsch unsuccessfully challenged Forever Hooligans (Alex Koslov and Rocky Romero) for the IWGP Junior Heavyweight Tag Team Championship at a Sacramento Wrestling Federation (SWF) event in Gridley, California. Following the match, Kushida saved Shelley from a beatdown at the hands of Koslov and Romero. Shelley and Kushida began forming the tag team "Time Splitters" and scoring several wins over Koslov and Romero in multiple man teamed matches, after debuting their new double-team finishing maneuver, the I-94. On October 8 at King of Pro-Wrestling, Time Splitters unsuccessfully challenged Forever Hooligans for the IWGP Junior Heavyweight Tag Team Championship.

On October 21, the Time Splitters entered the 2012 Super Jr. Tag Tournament, defeating Jado & Gedo in their first round match. On November 2, Shelley and Kushida defeated Suzuki-gun (Taichi and Taka Michinoku) to advance to the finals, where, later that same day, they defeated Apollo 55 to win the tournament and become the number one contenders to the IWGP Junior Heavyweight Tag Team Championship. On November 11 at Power Struggle, the Time Splitters defeated Forever Hooligans in a rematch to win the IWGP Junior Heavyweight Tag Team Championship. Time Splitters made their first successful title defense on February 10, 2013, at The New Beginning, defeating Forever Hooligans in the third title match between the two teams. Their second successful defense took place on March 3 at New Japan's 41st anniversary event, where they defeated Jyushin Thunder Liger and Tiger Mask.

On April 5, Shelley received his first shot at the IWGP Junior Heavyweight Championship, but was defeated by the defending champion, Prince Devitt. Two days later at Invasion Attack, Time Splitters defeated Devitt and Ryusuke Taguchi for their third successful defense of the IWGP Junior Heavyweight Tag Team Championship. On May 3 at Wrestling Dontaku 2013, Time Splitters lost the IWGP Junior Heavyweight Tag Team Championship back to the Forever Hooligans in their fourth defense.

==== Pursuit of the Tag Team Championships (2013–2015) ====
On June 22 at Dominion 6.22, Time Splitters failed in their attempt to regain the IWGP Junior Heavyweight Tag Team Championship from the Forever Hooligans. On September 29 at Destruction, Shelley and Kushida defeated Suzuki-gun (Taichi and Taka Michinoku) to earn another shot at the Forever Hooligans and the IWGP Junior Heavyweight Tag Team Championship. However, on October 7, New Japan announced that Shelley had suffered a back injury, which would force Time Splitters to back out of the title match. Shelley later revealed that he had received a severe sciatica taking a sitout powerbomb from Taichi, which marked his fourth injury in the promotion since his September 2012 return. Shelley wrestled his return match on January 4, 2014, at Wrestle Kingdom 8 in Tokyo Dome, where he and Kushida unsuccessfully challenged The Young Bucks for the IWGP Junior Heavyweight Tag Team Championship in a four-way match, which also included the Forever Hooligans and Suzuki-gun. Time Splitters were victorious in a non-title rematch the following day, after which they asserted themselves as The Young Bucks' next challengers. They received their title shot on February 11 at The New Beginning in Osaka, but were again defeated by The Young Bucks.

On May 9, Time Splitters made their Border City Wrestling (BCW) debut at the New Japan vs. Border City event, defeating former TNA wrestler Petey Williams and Brent B. Time Splitters received another title shot on May 10 at Global Wars, a special event co-produced by NJPW and Ring of Honor (ROH) in Toronto, but were defeated by The Young Bucks in a three-way match, also involving Forever Hooligans. On June 21 at Dominion 6.21, Time Splitters defeated The Young Bucks to win the IWGP Junior Heavyweight Tag Team Championship for the second time. On July 4, Kushida defeated Kota Ibushi to also win the IWGP Junior Heavyweight Championship. On August 10, Time Splitters made their first successful defense of the IWGP Junior Heavyweight Tag Team Championship against the ROH World Tag Team Champions reDRagon (Bobby Fish and Kyle O'Reilly). On September 21 at Destruction in Kobe, Kushida lost the IWGP Junior Heavyweight Championship to Ryusuke Taguchi in his first defense. Two days later at Destruction in Okayama, Time Splitters made their second successful defense of the IWGP Junior Heavyweight Tag Team Championship against Suzuki-gun (El Desperado and Taichi). On October 13 at King of Pro-Wrestling, Time Splitters made their third successful title defense in a three-way match against Forever Hooligans and The Young Bucks. On November 8 at Power Struggle, Time Splitters lost the title to 2014 Super Jr. Tag Tournament winners reDRagon.

On December 7, Time Splitters returned to ROH at Final Battle 2014, where they unsuccessfully challenged reDRagon for the ROH World Tag Team Championship. Time Splitters received a rematch for the IWGP Junior Heavyweight Tag Team Championship on January 4, 2015, at Wrestle Kingdom 9 in Tokyo Dome, in a four-way match also involving Forever Hooligans and The Young Bucks, but were again defeated by reDRagon. On February 11 at The New Beginning in Osaka, Time Splitters received another title shot in a three-way match, but were this time defeated by The Young Bucks, who became the new champions.

Following November's 2015 Super Jr. Tag Tournament, Shelley left Japan and returned to ROH, where he reformed Motor City Machine Guns tag team with Chris Sabin.

=== WWE (2020) ===
Shelley and Kushida were announced as participant of the 2020 Dusty Rhodes Tag Team Classic on January 8, when Alex was announced as Kushida's mystery partner. This was Shelley's first appearance for WWE, after a one-off appearance on WWE Heat back in his early wrestling days in 2005. On the January 15 episode of NXT, Kushida and Shelley lost to Grizzled Young Veterans (James Drake and Zack Gibson) in the first round of the tournament.

=== Impact Wrestling (2022–2024) ===
In 2022, Kushida began making appearances in Impact Wrestling, and would reunite with Shelley - who had himself already reunited with Chris Sabin to reform their long time team of The Motor City Machine Guns - and the three of them combined to form a faction called Time Machine (a nod to both the Time Splitters and the Machine Guns). Time Machine defeated The System

=== Return to NJPW (2026) ===
In October 2026, Kushida revived Time Splitters with Nick Wayne to form "Time Splliters V2" (also shortened to "TV2") to compete in the 2026 Super Junior Tag League as part of Block A. The duo finished the tournament with finished with 4 points (2–3) and failed to qualify for the finals.

== Championships and accomplishments ==
- New Japan Pro-Wrestling
  - IWGP Junior Heavyweight Championship (1 times) – Kushida
  - IWGP Junior Heavyweight Tag Team Championship (2 times) – Kushida and Shelley
  - Best of the Super Juniors (2015) – Kushida
  - Super Jr. Tag Tournament (2012) – Kushida and Shelley
