= Killer Elite Squad =

Professional wrestling tag team

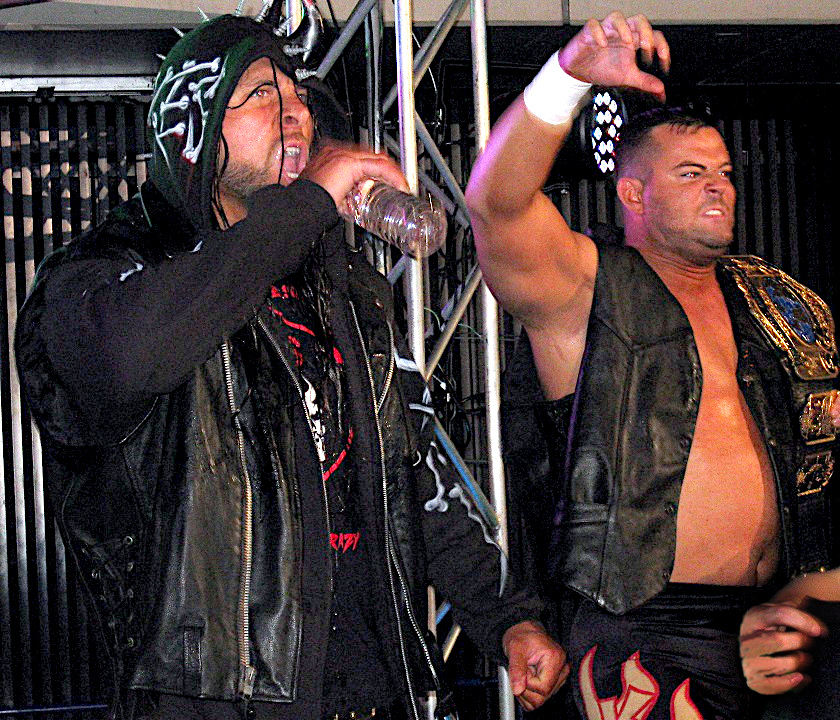
- (Left to right) Lance Archer and Davey Boy Smith Jr. in June 2013 as NWA World Tag Team Champions

Tag team
- Members: Davey Boy Smith Jr./Harry Smith; Lance Archer/Lance Hoyt
- Name: Killer Elite Squad (K.E.S.)
- Billed heights: Archer: 2.03 m (6 ft 8 in); Smith: 1.98 m (6 ft 6 in)
- Combined billed weight: 240 kg (530 lb)
- Debut: September 7, 2012
- Disbanded: June 15, 2019
- Years active: 2012–2019

Killer Elite Squad, often abbreviated to K.E.S., was the professional wrestling tag team of Davey Boy Smith Jr. and Lance Archer. The team made its debut in the New Japan Pro-Wrestling (NJPW) promotion in September 2012 and have since worked together also in North America, most notably for the National Wrestling Alliance (NWA). In Japan, they have worked as part of the larger Suzuki-gun stable ever since being put together by NJPW.

They are seven-time Tag Team Champions between the U.S. and Japan, being former three-time IWGP Tag Team Champions, two-time GHC Tag Team Champions and two-time NWA World Tag Team Champions.

Japanese promotions usually refer to the team only by the initials, while North American promotions use the full name, while sometimes also referring to Archer and Smith by the ring names Lance Hoyt and Harry Smith, respectively.

== History ==
=== New Japan Pro-Wrestling (2012–2015) ===
On July 22, 2012, New Japan Pro-Wrestling (NJPW) presented a show, during which Lance Archer, member of the villainous Suzuki-gun stable, challenged Tencozy (Hiroyoshi Tenzan and Satoshi Kojima) to a match for the IWGP Tag Team Championship, however, without specifying who his partner would be. The partner was eventually revealed on August 13 as Harry Smith, best known from the WWE, but who also had worked for NJPW in 2005. Smith made his debut as a member of Suzuki-gun on September 7 in an eight-man tag team match, where he, Archer, the stable's leader Minoru Suzuki and Taka Michinoku were defeated by Tenzan, Kojima, Togi Makabe and Yuji Nagata via disqualification. On September 24, Smith was renamed Davey Boy Smith Jr., after his late father.

On October 8 at King of Pro-Wrestling, Archer and Smith, now known collectively as K.E.S. (Killer Elite Squad), defeated Tencozy to win the IWGP Tag Team Championship, bringing Suzuki-gun its first title. They made their first successful title defense on November 11 at Power Struggle, defeating Tencozy in a rematch. From November 20 to December 1, K.E.S. took part in the round-robin portion of the 2012 World Tag League, finishing with a record of four wins and two losses, advancing to the semifinals of the tournament in the second place in their block. On December 2, K.E.S. defeated Always Hypers (Togi Makabe and Wataru Inoue) to advance to the finals of the tournament, where, later that same day, they were defeated by Sword & Guns (Hirooki Goto and Karl Anderson). This led to a rematch on January 4, 2013, at Wrestle Kingdom 7 in Tokyo Dome, where K.E.S. successfully defended the IWGP Tag Team Championship against Sword & Guns.

Back in NJPW, Suzuki-gun, K.E.S. included, entered a storyline rivalry with the Chaos stable. On February 10 at The New Beginning, K.E.S. retained the IWGP Tag Team Championship against Tencozy, after which Archer challenged Chaos' Shinsuke Nakamura to a match for his IWGP Intercontinental Championship. Archer went on to fail in his title challenge on March 3 at New Japan's 41st anniversary event. The rivalry between Suzuki-gun and Chaos continued during the 2013 New Japan Cup with Archer being eliminated in the first round by Kazuchika Okada, while Smith eliminated Nakamura in his first round match. After defeating another Chaos member, Yujiro Takahashi, in the second round, Smith was eventually eliminated from the tournament in the semifinals by Hirooki Goto. On April 5, K.E.S. made their fourth successful defense of the IWGP Tag Team Championship against Chaos representatives Shinsuke Nakamura and Tomohiro Ishii. Two days later at Invasion Attack, Smith unsuccessfully challenged Nakamura for the IWGP Intercontinental Championship in a rematch of their New Japan Cup bout.

Through NJPW's relationship with the National Wrestling Alliance (NWA), Archer and Smith took part in an NWA event in Houston, Texas on April 20, where they defeated the Kingz of the Underground (Ryan Genesis and Scot Summers) to not only retain the IWGP Tag Team Championship, but to also win the NWA World Tag Team Championship. On May 3 at Wrestling Dontaku 2013, K.E.S. lost the IWGP Tag Team Championship back to Tencozy in a four-way match, which also included the Chaos team of Takashi Iizuka and Toru Yano, and Muscle Orchestra (Manabu Nakanishi and Strong Man), ending their reign at 207 days. On August 11, Archer and Smith faced off during the final day of the 2013 G1 Climax. Smith entered the match with a chance to advance from the block, but was in the end eliminated after being defeated by Archer.

On November 9 at Power Struggle, K.E.S. faced Tencozy and The IronGodz (Jax Dane and Rob Conway) in a two-fall three-way match, contested for both the IWGP Tag Team Championship and the NWA World Tag Team Championship. In the first fall, they lost the NWA World Tag Team Championship to The IronGodz, but came back in the second to defeat Tencozy to win the IWGP Tag Team Championship for the second time. On November 24, K.E.S. entered the 2013 World Tag League, where they won their block with a record of five wins and one loss. On December 8, K.E.S. was eliminated from the tournament in the semifinals by their old rival team, Tencozy. On January 4, 2014, at Wrestle Kingdom 8 in Tokyo Dome, K.E.S. lost the IWGP Tag Team Championship to the winners of the tournament, Bullet Club (Doc Gallows and Karl Anderson). K.E.S. received a rematch for the IWGP Tag Team Championship on February 9 at The New Beginning in Hiroshima, but were again defeated by Bullet Club.

On May 25 at Back to the Yokohama Arena, K.E.S. failed in their attempt to regain the NWA World Tag Team Championship from Tencozy in a three-way match, which also included Rob Conway and Wes Brisco. On June 21 at Dominion 6.21, K.E.S. received another shot at the NWA World Tag Team Championship, this time in a regular tag team match, but were again defeated by Tencozy. Yet another match between the two teams took place on October 13 at King of Pro-Wrestling, where K.E.S. finally defeated Tencozy to win the NWA World Tag Team Championship for the second time. From November 22 to December 5, K.E.S. took part in the 2014 World Tag League. Finishing their block with a record of four wins and three losses, the two failed to advance to the finals due to losing to Kazushi Sakuraba and Toru Yano on the final day.

=== Independent circuit (2013–2015) ===
On January 18, 2013, Killer Elite Squad made their North American debut for Hart Legacy Wrestling (HLW) in Calgary, Alberta, Canada. After their original tag team match against Team Body Guys (Bobby Lashley and Chris Masters) was thrown out due to outside interference, they teamed with Lance Storm to defeat Lashley, Masters and Johnny Devine in a six-man tag team match. On November 15, 2014, at House of Hardcore VII, K.E.S. were defeated by Team 3D (Bully Ray and Devon) in a non-title match.

On April 4, 2015, K.E.S. made their debut for the American Ring of Honor (ROH) promotion as part of a storyline, where they were brought in by Michael Elgin to take care of War Machine (Hanson and Raymond Rowe). Their debut match against War Machine ended in a no contest.

On August 21, 2015, K.E.S. made their debut for Global Force Wrestling (GFW), where they took part in a tournament to crown the inaugural GFW Tag Team Champions, losing to Bullet Club (Doc Gallows and Karl Anderson) in the quarterfinals. On October 10, 2015, at an NWA Mid South event, K.E.S. lost the NWA World Tag Team Championship to the Heatseekers (Elliott Russell and Sigmon) in a three-way match, also involving the Illuminati (Chase Owens and Chris Richards).

=== Pro Wrestling Noah (2015–2016) ===
On January 10, 2015, K.E.S., along with the rest of Suzuki-gun, took part in a major storyline, where the stable invaded a Pro Wrestling Noah show. During the attack, K.E.S. beat down GHC Tag Team Champions TMDK (Mikey Nicholls and Shane Haste). This led to a match on February 11, where K.E.S. defeated TMDK with help from Suzuki-gun stablemate El Desperado to become the new GHC Tag Team Champions – and when added with their NWA World Tag Team title, making them double champions. A rematch between the two teams took place on March 15, which saw K.E.S. make their first successful defense of the GHC title. From April 19 through May 4, K.E.S. took part in the 2015 Global Tag League, where they made it to the finals where they were defeated by Masato Tanaka and Takashi Sugiura. K.E.S. held the GHC Tag Team Championship for the rest of 2015 and into 2016, setting a new record for most successful defenses. From April 21 to May 4, K.E.S. took part in the 2016 Global Tag League, again making it to the finals, where they were defeated by Naomichi Marufuji and Toru Yano. On May 28, K.E.S. lost the GHC Tag Team Championship to Marufuji and Yano in their 11th defense. Their 15-month title reign was the second longest in Noah history. K.E.S. regained the GHC Tag Team Championship from Marufuji and Yano on November 23. They lost the title to Go Shiozaki and Maybach Taniguchi on December 3. Two days later, it was announced that Suzuki-gun was gone from Noah, concluding the invasion storyline.

=== Return to NJPW (2017–2019) ===
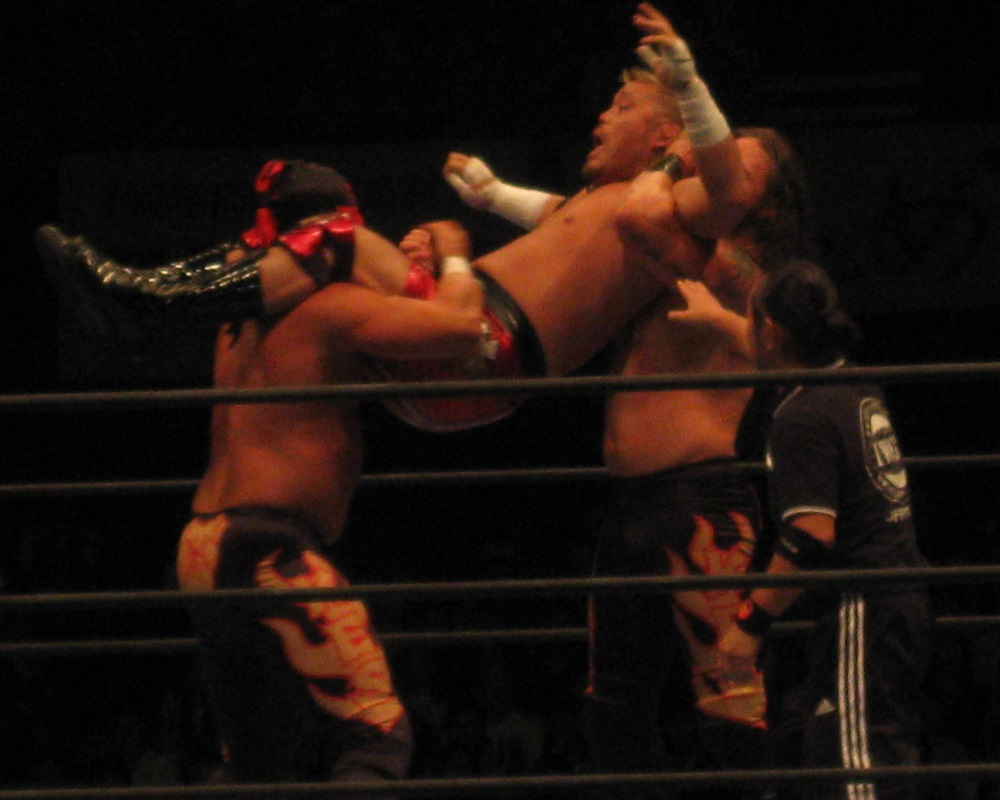
Archer and Smith performing the Killer Bomb on Hiroyoshi Tenzan

On January 5, 2017, K.E.S., along with the rest of Suzuki-gun, returned to NJPW, attacking the Chaos stable with Archer and Smith targeting IWGP Tag Team Champions Tomohiro Ishii and Toru Yano. On February 5 at The New Beginning in Sapporo, K.E.S. unsuccessfully challenged Ishii and Yano for the IWGP Tag Team Championship in a three-way match, also involving Togi Makabe and Tomoaki Honma. Following the event, Archer was sidelined with a herniated disc in his lower back, which would require surgery and sideline him for a significant amount of time. Prior to the injury, K.E.S. were primed for a run as NJPW's top foreign tag team. Archer returned from his injury on August 13, when he and Smith attacked IWGP Tag Team Champions War Machine and Guerrillas of Destiny (Tama Tonga and Tanga Loa). On the following tour, K.E.S., War Machine and Guerrillas of Destiny were booked in three three-way matches for the IWGP Tag Team Championship. The first two matches on September 10 at Destruction in Fukushima and September 16 at Destruction in Hiroshima were won by War Machine. The third match, contested under tornado tag team match rules, on September 24 at Destruction in Kobe was won by K.E.S., who became the new IWGP Tag Team Champions, winning the title for the first time in three years and eight months. At the end of the year, K.E.S. took part in the 2017 World Tag League, where they finished with a record of five wins and two losses, failing to advance to the finals due to losing to block winners Guerrillas of Destiny in their head-to-head match. On January 4, 2018, at Wrestle Kingdom 12 in Tokyo Dome, K.E.S. lost the IWGP Tag Team Championship to the winners of the World Tag League, Los Ingobernables de Japón (Evil and Sanada). On June 15, 2019, it was reported that Smith would no longer be wrestling for NJPW.

== Championships and accomplishments ==
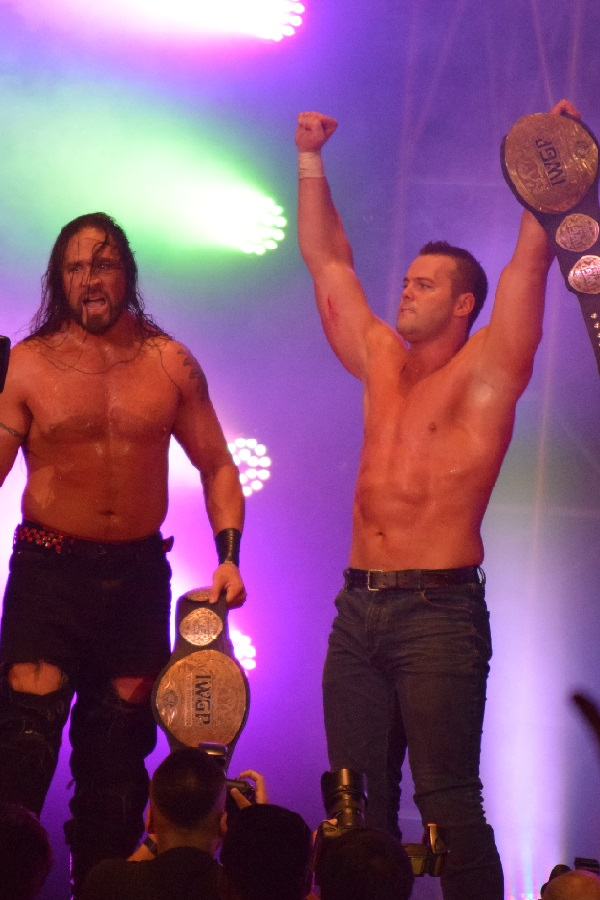
Archer and Smith as the IWGP Tag Team Champions in September 2017

- National Wrestling Alliance
  - NWA World Tag Team Championship (2 times)
- New Japan Pro-Wrestling
  - IWGP Tag Team Championship (3 times)
- Pro Wrestling Illustrated
  - Ranked Archer No. 92 of the 500 best singles wrestlers in the PWI 500 in 2015
  - Ranked Smith Jr. No. 81 of the 500 best singles wrestlers in the PWI 500 in 2015
- Pro Wrestling Noah
  - GHC Tag Team Championship (2 times)
