= Power Struggle (2026) =

2026 New Japan Pro-Wrestling event

- Promotional poster
- Promotion: New Japan Pro-Wrestling
- Date: November 3, 2026
- City: Hiroshima, Japan
- Venue: Hiroshima Sun Plaza
- Attendance: 3,683

Event chronology
← Previous; King of Pro-Wrestling	Next → Wrestle Kingdom 21

Power Struggle chronology
← Previous; 2024	Next → —

Power Struggle was a professional wrestling event promoted by New Japan Pro-Wrestling. It was took place on November 3, 2026, in Hiroshima, Japan, at the Hiroshima Sun Plaza. It was the fourteenth event under the Power Struggle chronology.

== Storylines ==
Power Struggle featured professional wrestling matches that involved different wrestlers from pre-existing scripted feuds and storylines. Wrestlers portrayed villains, heroes, or less distinguishable characters in the scripted events that built tension and culminated in a wrestling match or series of matches.

== Results ==
No.	Results	Stipulations	Times
1	Aaron Wolf, Master Wato, and Kuukai defeated United Empire (Francesco Akira, Jakob Austin Young, and Zane Jay) by submission	Six-man tag team match	5:57
2	Místico, Kushida, and Masatora Yasuda defeated Unbound Co. (Titán, Gedo, and Daiki Nagai) by submission	Six-man tag team match	4:46
3	TMDK (Ryohei Oiwa and Hartley Jackson) defeated The Swirl (Blake Christian and Lee Johnson) by submission	Tag team match	7:30
4	Yuya Uemura, Toru Yano, Ryusuke Taguchi, and Kazuma Sumi defeated House of Torture (Ren Narita, Shun Skywalker, Douki, and Yoshinobu Kanemaru) by pinfall	Eight-man tag team match	8:18
5	Shota Umino, Yoh, and Hyo defeated House of Torture (Yujiro Takahashi, Sho, and Dick Togo) by pinfall	Six-man tag team match	7:02
6	Unbound Co. (Shingo Takagi and Jeff Cobb) defeated Death Riders (Jon Moxley and Wheeler Yuta) by pinfall	Tag team match	14:02
7	Knock Out Brothers (Yuto-Ice and Oskar) (c) defeated United Empire (Will Ospreay and Callum Newman) by disqualification	Tag team match for IWGP Tag Team Championship	18:27
8	Kenny Omega defeated Yota Tsuji and Boltin Oleg by pinfall	Three-way match Since Omega won, he receivee a title match for Tsuji's IWGP Heavyweight Championship at Wrestle Kingdom 21.	12:54
9	Unbound Co. (Taiji Ishimori and Robbie X) defeated Ichiban Sweet Boys (Robbie Eagles and Kosei Fujita) by pinfall	2026 Super Junior Tag League tournament final	11:29
10	Gabe Kidd (c) defeated Taichi by pinfall	Singles match for the IWGP Global Heavyweight Championship; Had Gabe lost, he would have never step foot in a NJPW ring again.	29:58
(c) / – the champion(s) heading into the match
