= G1 Climax 34 =

2024 edition of the G1 Climax

- Promotional poster of the tournament featuring Tetsuya Naito
- Promotion: New Japan Pro-Wrestling
- Date: July 20 – August 18, 2024
- City: See venues
- Venue: See venues

Event chronology
← Previous; 2024 Fantastica Mania: USA	Next → Capital Collision

G1 Climax chronology
← Previous; G1 Climax 33	Next → G1 Climax 35

G1 Climax 34
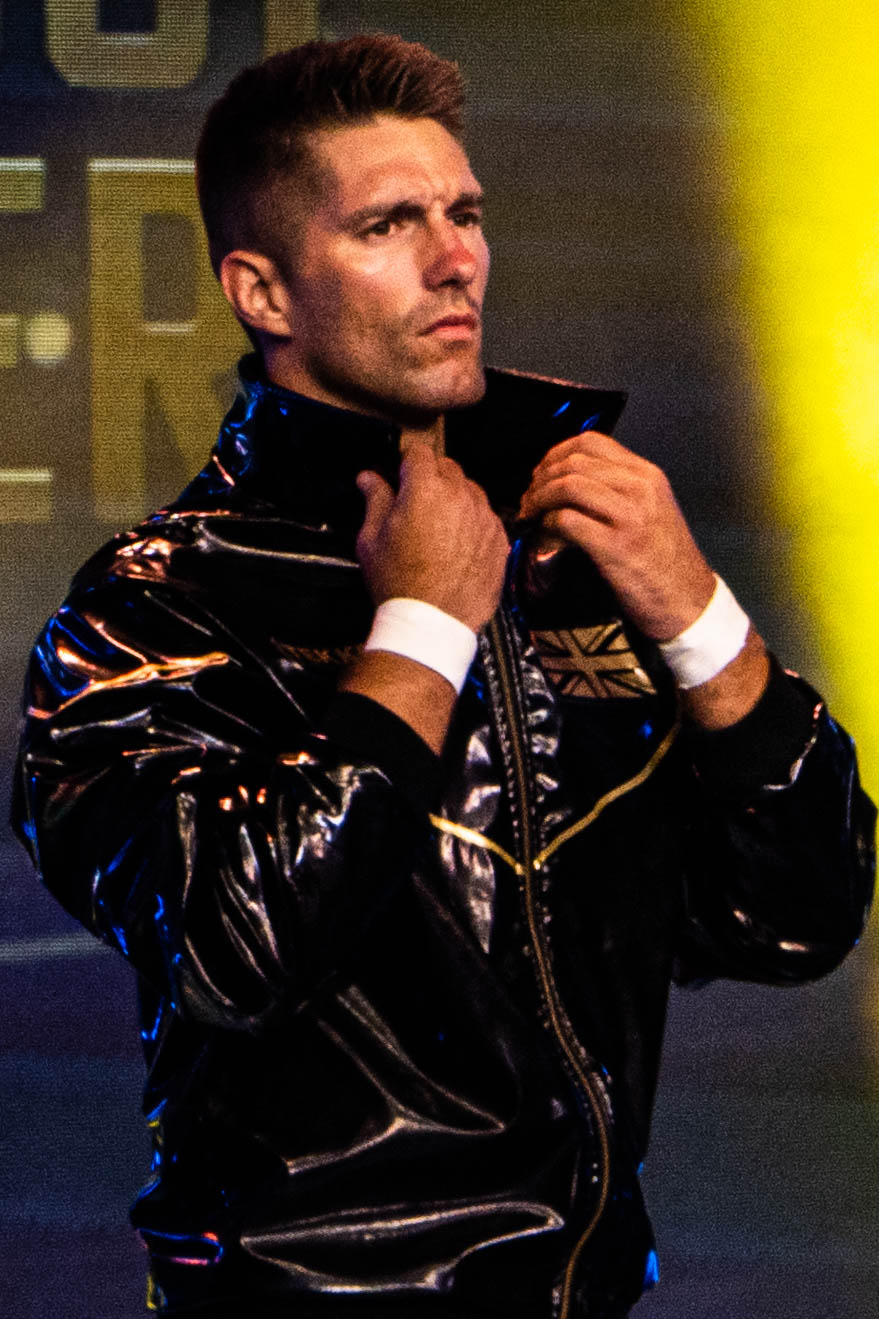
- Zack Sabre Jr., winner of G1 Climax 34

Tournament information
- Sport: Professional wrestling
- Location: Japan
- Dates: July 20, 2024–August 18, 2024
- Tournament format: Two-block round-robin tournament
- Participants: 20

Final positions
- Champion: Zack Sabre Jr.
- Runner-up: Yota Tsuji

Tournament statistics
- Attendance: 48,683
- Bouts fought: 94

The G1 Climax 34 was a professional wrestling tournament promoted by New Japan Pro-Wrestling (NJPW). The tournament commenced on July 20 and concluded on August 18, 2024. It was the thirty-fourth edition of G1 Climax and the fiftieth edition of the tournament counting its previous forms under different names.

Considered NJPW's most important tournament, the G1 Climax features 20 wrestlers, divided into two blocks of ten ("A" and "B"). Each participant faces all nine other wrestlers within the same block in singles matches. The 2024 tournament saw a return to 20 participants split into two 10-man blocks for the first time since 2021.

== Production ==
=== Tournament rules ===
The tournament features 20 wrestlers, divided into two blocks of ten ("A "B"). Each participant faces all nine other wrestlers within the same block in singles matches. The winner of each block is determined via a point system, with two points for a win, one point for a draw, and no points for a loss; each night of the event sees one match from each block between two members competing for the tournament. In case of several wrestlers sharing the top score, the results of the matches those wrestlers had when facing each other in the tournament act as tiebreaker, with the one having the most wins over the other top-scorers determining the winner of the block.

On the final three days of the event, top 3 wrestlers in each block advances and enter into a six-man playoff, with the block winners earning a bye into the semifinals to determine the winner of the G1 Climax, who would gain a future match for the IWGP World Heavyweight Championship, NJPW's top championship, at Wrestle Kingdom, NJPW's biggest yearly event; if the IWGP Heavyweight Champion himself wins, he selects his opponent at Wrestle Kingdom. The matches of the tournament have a 30-minutes time limit (with the time limit being reached resulting in a tie); the quarterfinals (2nd and 3rd places of the block), the semifinal (block winners and quarterfinals winners) and final (semifinal winners) matches, where a winner must be determined, have no time limit.

=== History ===
On April 3, 2024, NJPW officially announced the 2024 edition of the tournament between July 20 and August 18; as usual, the tournament took place over several cities and locations across Japan.

=== Storylines ===
The event includes matches that result from scripted storylines, where wrestlers portray heroes, villains, or less distinguishable characters in scripted events that build tension and culminate in a wrestling match or series of matches.

=== Venues ===
Dates	Venue	Location
July 20	Osaka Prefectural Gymnasium	Namba, Osaka
July 21	Osaka Prefectural Gymnasium	Namba, Osaka
July 23	Hiroshima Sun Plaza	Nishi-ku, Hiroshima
July 25	Sunmesse Kagawa	Takamatsu, Kagawa
July 27	Dejima Messe Nagasaki	Nagasaki City, Nagasaki
July 28	Fukuoka Convention Center	Hakata-ku, Fukuoka
July 29	Fukuoka Convention Center	Hakata-ku, Fukuoka
July 31	KDDI Ishin Hall	Yamaguchi City, Yamaguchi
August 3	Yamato Arena	Suita, Osaka
August 4	Aichi Prefectural Gymnasium	Nagoya, Aichi
August 6	Korakuen Hall	Bunkyo, Tokyo
August 7	Korakuen Hall	Bunkyo, Tokyo
August 8	Yokohama Budokan	Naka-ku, Yokohama
August 10	Xebio Arena Sendai	Sendai, Miyagi
August 12	City Hall Plaza Aore Nagaoka	Nagaoka, Niigata
August 14	Hamamatsu Arena	Higashi-ku, Hamamatsu
August 15	Makuhari Messe	Mihama-ku, Chiba
August 17	Ryōgoku Kokugikan	Sumida, Tokyo
August 18	Ryōgoku Kokugikan	Sumida, Tokyo

== Qualifying Tournament ==
Before the main tournament there was a Qualifying Tournament during New Japan Soul tour to determine one entrant for each block.

Block A Qualifying Tournament

Quarterfinals
Yoshi-Hashi	Pin
Chase Owens	14:01
Yujiro Takahashi	12:12
Callum Newman	Pin

Semifinals
Tomohiro Ishii	26:01
Yoshi-Hashi	Pin
Kenta	14:38
Callum Newman	Pin

Finals
Yoshi-Hashi	11:59
Callum Newman	Pin

Block B Qualifying Tournament

Quarterfinals
Toru Yano	9:16
Boltin Oleg	Sub
Satoshi Kojima	12:50
TJP	Pin

Semifinals
Hiroshi Tanahashi	6:50
Boltin Oleg	Pin
Taichi	Pin
TJP	19:26

Finals
Boltin Oleg	Pin
Taichi	16:27

== Participants ==
New Japan Pro Wrestling announced the eighteen official participants of the two blocks on June 16, 2024, with six qualifiers who competed in Qualifying Tournament.

*Noted underneath are the champions who held their titles at the time of the tournament.

Wrestler	Unit	Notes
Tetsuya Naito	Los Ingobernables de Japon	IWGP World Heavyweight Champion, G1 Climax winner (23, 27, 33), 15th appearance
Shota Umino	Unaffiliated	2nd appearance
Shingo Takagi	Los Ingobernables de Japon	6th appearance
Sanada	Just 5 Guys	9th appearance
Great-O-Khan	United Empire	KOPW 2024 Provisional Champion, 4th appearance
Zack Sabre Jr.	TMDK	8th appearance
Gabe Kidd	Bullet Club War Dogs	NJPW Strong Openweight Champion, 2nd appearance
Evil	House of Torture	9th appearance
Jake Lee	Bullet Club War Dogs	1st appearance
Callum Newman	United Empire	Winner of Block A Qualifying Tournament, 1st appearance
Hirooki Goto	Chaos	G1 Climax winner (18), 17th appearance
El Phantasmo	Guerrillas of Destiny	3rd appearance
Yota Tsuji	Los Ingobernables de Japon	2nd appearance
Yuya Uemura	Just 5 Guys	1st appearance
Jeff Cobb	United Empire	NJPW World Television Champion, 6th appearance
Henare	United Empire	NEVER Openweight Champion, 3rd appearance
David Finlay	Bullet Club War Dogs	IWGP Global Heavyweight Champion, 3rd appearance
Ren Narita	House of Torture	2nd appearance
Konosuke Takeshita	Don Callis Family (AEW-DDT)	1st appearance
Oleg Boltin	Unaffiliated	NEVER Openweight 6-Man Tag Team Champion, Winner of Block B Qualifying Tournament, 1st appearance

== Results ==
=== Night 1 ===
The first night of the tournament took place on July 20, 2024, at Osaka Prefectural Gymnasium in Namba, Osaka.

No.	Results	Stipulations	Times
1	Oleg Boltin defeated Ren Narita by pinfall	B Block singles match in the G1 Climax tournament	7:46
2	Callum Newman defeated Shota Umino by pinfall	A Block singles match in the G1 Climax tournament	9:45
3	Henare defeated El Phantasmo (with Jado) by pinfall	B Block singles match in the G1 Climax tournament	9:26
4	Zack Sabre Jr. (with Kosei Fujita) defeated Great-O-Khan by pinfall	A Block singles match in the G1 Climax tournament	11:10
5	Jeff Cobb defeated Hirooki Goto by pinfall	B Block singles match in the G1 Climax tournament	7:24
6	Jake Lee defeated Sanada by pinfall	A Block singles match in the G1 Climax tournament	4:57
7	Yuya Uemura defeated David Finlay by pinfall	B Block singles match in the G1 Climax tournament	16:22
8	Evil (with Dick Togo) defeated Gabe Kidd by pinfall	A Block singles match in the G1 Climax tournament	10:19
9	Konosuke Takeshita defeated Yota Tsuji by pinfall	B Block singles match in the G1 Climax tournament	17:14
10	Shingo Takagi defeated Tetsuya Naito by pinfall	A Block singles match in the G1 Climax tournament	23:13

=== Night 2 ===
The second night of the tournament took place on July 21, 2024, at Osaka Prefectural Gymnasium in Namba, Osaka.

No.	Results	Stipulations	Times
1	Sanada defeated Callum Newman by pinfall	A Block singles match in the G1 Climax tournament	8:41
2	Henare defeated Oleg Boltin by pinfall	B Block singles match in the G1 Climax tournament	8:07
3	Gabe Kidd defeated Great-O-Khan by pinfall	A Block singles match in the G1 Climax tournament	12:01
4	Ren Narita defeated El Phantasmo (with Jado) by pinfall	B Block singles match in the G1 Climax tournament	14:16
5	Evil (with Dick Togo) defeated Jake Lee by pinfall	A Block singles match in the G1 Climax tournament	11:20
6	Yuya Uemura defeated Hirooki Goto by pinfall	B Block singles match in the G1 Climax tournament	12:38
7	Shota Umino defeated Shingo Takagi by pinfall	A Block singles match in the G1 Climax tournament	18:22
8	Zack Sabre Jr. (with Kosei Fujita) defeated Tetsuya Naito by pinfall	A Block singles match in the G1 Climax tournament	16:03
9	Yota Tsuji defeated David Finlay (with Gedo) by pinfall	B Block singles match in the G1 Climax tournament	19:50

=== Night 3 ===
The third night of the tournament took place on July 23, 2024, at Hiroshima Sun Plaza in Nishi-ku, Hiroshima.

No.	Results	Stipulations	Times
1	Katsuya Murashima, Toru Yano and Oleg Boltin defeated Shoma Kato, Tomoaki Honma and Hirooki Goto by submission	Six-man tag team match	5:09
2	Los Ingobernables de Japón (Bushi and Yota Tsuji) defeated Jado and El Phantasmo by pinfall	Tag team match	7:04
3	United Empire (Henare and Francesco Akira) defeated Bullet Club War Dogs (David Finlay and Gedo) by pinfall	Tag team match	8:13
4	Konosuke Takeshita defeated Jeff Cobb by pinfall	B Block singles match in the G1 Climax tournament	10:28
5	Zack Sabre Jr. (with Kosei Fujita) defeated Callum Newman by submission	A Block singles match in the G1 Climax tournament	11:56
6	Shingo Takagi defeated Great-O-Khan by pinfall	A Block singles match in the G1 Climax tournament	11:04
7	Gabe Kidd defeated Shota Umino by pinfall	A Block singles match in the G1 Climax tournament	15:56
8	Evil (with Dick Togo) defeated Sanada by pinfall	A Block singles match in the G1 Climax tournament	18:04
9	Tetsuya Naito defeated Jake Lee by pinfall	A Block singles match in the G1 Climax tournament	17:03

=== Night 4 ===
The fourth night of the tournament took place on July 25, 2024, at Sunmesse Kagawa in Takamatsu, Kagawa.

No.	Results	Stipulations	Times
1	Just 5 Guys (Sanada and Taka Michinoku) defeated Katsuya Murashima and Toru Yano by submission	Tag team match	6:34
2	United Empire (Callum Newman, Great-O-Khan and Francesco Akira) defeated Shoma Kato, Tomoaki Honma and Shota Umino by pinfall	Six-man tag team match	7:49
3	Bullet Club War Dogs (Jake Lee and Gabe Kidd) defeated TMDK (Kosei Fujita and Zack Sabre Jr.) by pinfall	Tag team match	6:30
4	Los Ingobernables de Japón (Tetsuya Naito and Shingo Takagi) defeated House of Torture (Dick Togo and Evil) by pinfall	Tag team match	8:44
5	Hirooki Goto defeated Oleg Boltin by pinfall	B Block singles match in the G1 Climax tournament	10:17
6	Ren Narita defeated Jeff Cobb by pinfall	B Block singles match in the G1 Climax tournament	12:02
7	El Phantasmo (with Jado) defeated Yota Tsuji by pinfall	B Block singles match in the G1 Climax tournament	17:57
8	David Finlay (with Gedo) defeated Henare by pinfall	B Block singles match in the G1 Climax tournament	16:09
9	Yuya Uemura defeated Konosuke Takeshita by pinfall	B Block singles match in the G1 Climax tournament	23:10

=== Night 5 ===
The fifth night of the tournament took place on July 27, 2024, at Dejima Messe Nagasaki in Nagasaki City, Nagasaki.

No.	Results	Stipulations	Times
1	Henare and Konosuke Takeshita defeated Katsuya Murashima and Shoma Kato by pinfall	Tag team match	6:44
2	Oleg Boltin and Toru Yano defeated Jado and El Phantasmo by pinfall	Tag team match	6:17
3	United Empire (Jeff Cobb and Francesco Akira) defeated Just 5 Guys (Taka Michinoku and Yuya Uemura) by pinfall	Tag team match	5:50
4	House of Torture (Ren Narita and Yoshinobu Kanemaru) defeated Bullet Club War Dogs (David Finlay and Gedo) by pinfall	Tag team match	5:23
5	Los Ingobernables de Japón (Bushi and Yota Tsuji) defeated Tomoaki Honma and Hirooki Goto by pinfall	Tag team match	6:03
6	Callum Newman defeated Shingo Takagi by pinfall	A Block singles match in the G1 Climax tournament	12:51
7	Sanada defeated Gabe Kidd by pinfall	A Block singles match in the G1 Climax tournament	12:13
8	Shota Umino defeated Great-O-Khan by pinfall	A Block singles match in the G1 Climax tournament	15:06
9	Zack Sabre Jr. (with Kosei Fujita) defeated Jake Lee by submission	A Block singles match in the G1 Climax tournament	17:46
10	Evil (with Dick Togo) defeated Tetsuya Naito by pinfall	A Block singles match in the G1 Climax tournament	16:11

=== Night 6 ===
The sixth night of the tournament took place on July 28, 2024, at Fukuoka Convention Center in Hakata-ku, Fukuoka.

No.	Results	Stipulations	Times
1	Be-Bop Tag Team (Toru Yano and Hiroshi Tanahashi) defeated Just 5 Guys (Taka Michinoku and Sanada) by submission	Tag team match	6:22
2	United Empire (Callum Newman and Great-O-Khan) defeated House of Torture (Dick Togo and Evil) by pinfall	Tag team match	6:43
3	TMDK (Kosei Fujita and Zack Sabre Jr.) defeated Tomoaki Honma and Shota Umino by pinfall	Tag team match	6:10
4	Los Ingobernables de Japón (Tetsuya Naito, Shingo Takagi and Bushi) defeated Bullet Club War Dogs (Gedo, Jake Lee and Gabe Kidd) by pinfall	Six-man tag team match	7:09
5	Oleg Boltin defeated El Phantasmo (with Jado) by pinfall	B Block singles match in the G1 Climax tournament	12:16
6	Jeff Cobb defeated Yuya Uemura by pinfall	B Block singles match in the G1 Climax tournament	12:29
7	Konosuke Takeshita defeated Henare by pinfall	B Block singles match in the G1 Climax tournament	13:19
8	David Finlay (with Gedo) defeated Ren Narita (with Yoshinobu Kanemaru) by pinfall	B Block singles match in the G1 Climax tournament	11:01
9	Hirooki Goto defeated Yota Tsuji by pinfall	B Block singles match in the G1 Climax tournament	17:05

=== Night 7 ===
The seventh night of the tournament took place on July 29, 2024, at Fukuoka Convention Center in Hakata-ku, Fukuoka.

No.	Results	Stipulations	Times
1	Be-Bop Tag Team (Hiroshi Tanahashi and Toru Yano) defeated Just 5 Guys (Taka Michinoku and Yuya Uemura) by pinfall	Tag team match	3:41
2	Los Ingobernables de Japón (Yota Tsuji and Bushi) defeated Katsuya Murashima and Oleg Boltin by submission	Tag team match	8:27
3	United Empire (Jeff Cobb and Henare) defeated Jado and El Phantasmo by submission	Tag team match	7:40
4	House of Torture (Yoshinobu Kanemaru and Ren Narita) defeated Tomoaki Honma and Hirooki Goto by pinfall	Tag team match	5:12
5	Konosuke Takeshita and Francesco Akira and defeated Bullet Club War Dogs (Gedo and David Finlay) by pinfall	Tag team match	6:58
6	Evil (with Dick Togo) defeated Callum Newman by pinfall	A Block singles match in the G1 Climax tournament	8:40
7	Great-O-Khan defeated Jake Lee by pinfall	A Block singles match in the G1 Climax tournament	11:19
8	Shota Umino defeated Zack Sabre Jr. (with Kosei Fujita) by pinfall	A Block singles match in the G1 Climax tournament	19:13
9	Gabe Kidd defeated Shingo Takagi by pinfall	A Block singles match in the G1 Climax tournament	13:34
10	Tetsuya Naito defeated Sanada by pinfall	A Block singles match in the G1 Climax tournament	17:43

=== Night 8 ===
The eighth night of the tournament took place on July 31, 2024, at KDDI Ishin Hall in Yamaguchi City, Yamaguchi.

No.	Results	Stipulations	Times
1	Bullet Club War Dogs (Gabe Kidd and Jake Lee) defeated Katsuya Murashima and Shoma Kato by pinfall	Tag team match	4:36
2	United Empire (Great-O-Khan and Callum Newman) defeated House of Torture (Dick Togo and Evil) by pinfall	Tag team match	7:10
3	Tomoaki Honma and Shota Umino defeated Just 5 Guys (Taka Michinoku and Sanada) by pinfall	Tag team match	7:03
4	Los Ingobernables de Japón (Tetsuya Naito and Shingo Takagi) defeated TMDK (Kosei Fujita and Zack Sabre Jr.) by pinfall	Tag team match	7:03
5	Yota Tsuji defeated Oleg Boltin by pinfall	B Block singles match in the G1 Climax tournament	10:06
6	Henare defeated Yuya Uemura by pinfall	B Block singles match in the G1 Climax tournament	15:33
7	Jeff Cobb defeated El Phantasmo (with Jado) by pinfall	B Block singles match in the G1 Climax tournament	11:12
8	Ren Narita defeated Hirooki Goto by pinfall	B Block singles match in the G1 Climax tournament	12:19
9	David Finlay (with Gedo) defeated Konosuke Takeshita by pinfall	B Block singles match in the G1 Climax tournament	18:22

=== Night 9 ===
The ninth night of the tournament took place on August 3, 2024, at Yamato Arena in Suita, Osaka.

No.	Results	Stipulations	Times
1	Konosuke Takeshita and United Empire (Henare, Jeff Cobb and Francesco Akira) defeated Katsuya Murashima, Shoma Kato, Tomoaki Honma and Hirooki Goto by pinfall	Eight-man tag team match	8:18
2	Oleg Boltin and Toru Yano defeated Bullet Club War Dogs (Gedo and David Finlay) by pinfall	Tag team match	5:40
3	Just 5 Guys (Taka Michinoku and Yuya Uemura) defeated Jado and El Phantasmo by submission	Tag team match	7:34
4	Los Ingobernables de Japón (Bushi and Yota Tsuji) defeated House of Torture (Yoshinobu Kanemaru and Ren Narita) by pinfall	Tag team match	5:59
5	Jake Lee defeated Callum Newman by pinfall	A Block singles match in the G1 Climax tournament	11:14
6	Great-O-Khan defeated Evil (with Dick Togo) by pinfall	A Block singles match in the G1 Climax tournament	16:25
7	Tetsuya Naito defeated Gabe Kidd by pinfall	A Block singles match in the G1 Climax tournament	13:41
8	Sanada defeated Shota Umino by pinfall	A Block singles match in the G1 Climax tournament	15:57
9	Shingo Takagi defeated Zack Sabre Jr. (with Kosei Fujita) by pinfall	A Block singles match in the G1 Climax tournament	15:06

=== Night 10 ===
The tenth night of the tournament took place on August 4, 2024, at Aichi Prefectural Gymnasium in Nagoya, Aichi.

No.	Results	Stipulations	Times
1	United Empire (Callum Newman, Francesco Akira and Great-O-Khan) defeated Be-Bop Tag Team (Hiroshi Tanahashi and Toru Yano) and Shoma Kato by pinfall	Six-man tag team match	7:15
2	Bullet Club War Dogs (Gabe Kidd and Jake Lee) defeated Tomoaki Honma and Shota Umino by technical submission	Tag team match	10:00
3	Los Ingobernables de Japón (Tetsuya Naito and Shingo Takagi) defeated Just 5 Guys (Taka Michinoku and Sanada) by pinfall	Tag team match	7:23
4	David Finlay (with Gedo) defeated Oleg Boltin by pinfall	B Block singles match in the G1 Climax tournament	12:44
5	El Phantasmo (with Jado) defeated Yuya Uemura by pinfall	B Block singles match in the G1 Climax tournament	14:21
6	Jeff Cobb defeated Henare by pinfall	B Block singles match in the G1 Climax tournament	12:40
7	Hirooki Goto defeated Konosuke Takeshita by pinfall	B Block singles match in the G1 Climax tournament	14:04
8	Yota Tsuji defeated Ren Narita by pinfall	B Block singles match in the G1 Climax tournament	20:21

=== Night 11 ===
The eleventh night of the tournament took place on August 6, 2024, at Korakuen Hall in Bunkyo, Tokyo.

No.	Results	Stipulations	Times
1	Los Ingobernables de Japón (Yota Tsuji and Bushi) defeated Katsuya Murashima and Shoma Kato by submission	Tag team match	3:43
2	Konosuke Takeshita and United Empire (Francesco Akira, Jeff Cobb, and Henare) defeated Jado, El Phantasmo, Toru Yano and Oleg Boltin by submission	Tag team match	3:48
3	House of Torture (Ren Narita and Yoshinobu Kanemaru) defeated Just 5 Guys (Taka Michinoku and Yuya Uemura) by pinfall	Eight-man tag team match	5:50
4	Tomoaki Honma and Hirooki Goto defeated Bullet Club War Dogs (Gedo and David Finlay) by pinfall	Tag team match	2:49
5	Great-O-Khan defeated Callum Newman by pinfall	A Block singles match in the G1 Climax tournament	8:16
6	Jake Lee defeated Gabe Kidd by countout	A Block singles match in the G1 Climax tournament	5:11
7	Zack Sabre Jr. defeated Evil (with Dick Togo) by pinfall	A Block singles match in the G1 Climax tournament	0:19
8	Tetsuya Naito defeated Shota Umino by pinfall	A Block singles match in the G1 Climax tournament	14:47
9	Sanada defeated Shingo Takagi by pinfall	A Block singles match in the G1 Climax tournament	19:45

=== Night 12 ===
The twelfth night of the tournament took place on August 7, 2024, at Korakuen Hall in Bunkyo, Tokyo.

No.	Results	Stipulations	Times
1	United Empire (Great-O-Khan and Callum Newman) defeated Just 5 Guys (Taka Michinoku and Sanada) by pinfall	Tag team match	5:44
2	Bullet Club War Dogs (Jake Lee and Gabe Kidd) defeated Tomoaki Honma and Shota Umino by pinfall	Tag team match	6:38
3	Los Ingobernables de Japón (Shingo Takagi and Tetsuya Naito) defeated House of Torture (Dick Togo and Evil) by submission	Tag team match	6:17
4	Jeff Cobb defeated Oleg Boltin by pinfall	B Block singles match in the G1 Climax tournament	10:09
5	Konosuke Takeshita defeated El Phantasmo (with Jado) by pinfall	B Block singles match in the G1 Climax tournament	17:21
6	Yota Tsuji defeated Henare by pinfall	B Block singles match in the G1 Climax tournament	15:37
7	Ren Narita (with Yoshinobu Kanemaru) defeated Yuya Uemura by pinfall	B Block singles match in the G1 Climax tournament	11:47
8	Hirooki Goto defeated David Finlay (with Gedo) by pinfall	B Block singles match in the G1 Climax tournament	17:47

=== Night 13 ===
The thirteenth night of the tournament took place on August 8, 2024, at Yokohama Budokan in Naka-ku, Yokohama.

No.	Results	Stipulations	Times
1	Toru Yano and Oleg Boltin defeated Katsuya Murashima and Shoma Kato by pinfall	Tag team match	4:09
2	Konosuke Takeshita and Henare defeated House of Torture (Yoshinobu Kanemaru and Ren Narita) by submission	Tag team match	5:34
3	Tomoaki Honma and Hirooki Goto defeated Jado and El Phantasmo by pinfall	Tag team match	3:57
4	United Empire (Jeff Cobb and Francesco Akira) defeated Bullet Club War Dogs (Gedo and David Finlay) by pinfall	Tag team match	5:55
5	Los Ingobernables de Japón (Yota Tsuji and Bushi) defeated Just 5 Guys (Taka Michinoku and Yuya Uemura) by submission	Tag team match	6:04
6	Tetsuya Naito defeated Callum Newman by pinfall	A Block singles match in the G1 Climax tournament	5:54
7	Great-O-Khan defeated Sanada by pinfall	A Block singles match in the G1 Climax tournament	11:11
8	Jake Lee defeated Shota Umino by pinfall	A Block singles match in the G1 Climax tournament	16:03
9	Zack Sabre Jr. defeated Gabe Kidd by technical submission	A Block singles match in the G1 Climax tournament	16:19
10	Shingo Takagi defeated Evil (with Dick Togo) by pinfall	A Block singles match in the G1 Climax tournament	16:54

=== Night 14 ===
The fourteenth night of the tournament took place on August 10, 2024, at Xebio Arena Sendai in Sendai, Miyagi.

On this night of B Block competition, Yuya Uemura suffered a legitimate right arm injury in his match with Yota Tsuji, resulting in Uemura having to withdraw from the tournament. Last remaining tournament match against Oleg Boltin on Night 16 was declared forfeit on Uemura's part.

No.	Results	Stipulations	Times
1	United Empire (Callum Newman, Great-O-Khan and Francesco Akira) defeated Be-Bop Tag Team (Hiroshi Tanahashi and Toru Yano) and Katsuya Murashima by submission	Six-man tag team match	6:31
2	Bullet Club War Dogs (Gedo, Gabe Kidd and Jake Lee) defeated Los Ingobernables de Japón (Bushi, Tetsuya Naito and Shingo Takagi) by submission	Six-man tag team match	8:43
3	Tomoaki Honma and Shota Umino defeated House of Torture (Dick Togo and Evil) by pinfall	Tag team match	8:03
4	Oleg Boltin defeated Konosuke Takeshita by pinfall	B Block singles match in the G1 Climax tournament	12:09
5	Ren Narita defeated Henare by pinfall	B Block singles match in the G1 Climax tournament	13:17
6	El Phantasmo (with Jado) defeated Hirooki Goto by pinfall	B Block singles match in the G1 Climax tournament	13:04
7	David Finlay (with Gedo) defeated Jeff Cobb by pinfall	B Block singles match in the G1 Climax tournament	11:39
8	Yuya Uemura defeated Yota Tsuji by pinfall	B Block singles match in the G1 Climax tournament	16:09

=== Night 15 ===
The fifteenth night of the tournament took place on August 12, 2024, at City Hall Plaza Aore Nagaoka in Nagaoka, Niigata.

No.	Results	Stipulations	Times
1	Hiroshi Tanahashi and Hirooki Goto defeated Los Ingobernables de Japón (Bushi and Yota Tsuji) by pinfall	Tag team match	6:39
2	Jado and El Phantasmo defeated Bullet Club War Dogs (Gedo and David Finlay) by pinfall	Tag team match	7:02
3	House of Torture (Ren Narita, Sho, Yujiro Takahashi and Yoshinobu Kanemaru) defeated United Empire (Francesco Akira, Jeff Cobb and Henare) and Konosuke Takeshita by pinfall	Eight-man tag team match	9:01
4	Gabe Kidd defeated Callum Newman by pinfall	A Block singles match in the G1 Climax tournament	4:51
5	Zack Sabre Jr. defeated Sanada by pinfall	A Block singles match in the G1 Climax tournament	15:44
6	Shingo Takagi defeated Jake Lee by pinfall	A Block singles match in the G1 Climax tournament	13:49
7	Shota Umino defeated Evil (with Dick Togo) by pinfall	A Block singles match in the G1 Climax tournament	19:46
8	Great-O-Khan defeated Tetsuya Naito by pinfall	A Block singles match in the G1 Climax tournament	18:57

=== Night 16 ===
The sixteenth night of the tournament took place on August 14, 2024, at Hamamatsu Arena in Higashi-ku, Hamamatsu.

No.	Results	Stipulations	Times
1	Toru Yano and Oleg Boltin defeated Katsuya Murashima and Shoma Kato by pinfall	Tag team match	4:13
2	Bullet Club War Dogs (Gabe Kidd and Jake Lee) defeated Just 5 Guys (Taka Michinoku and Sanada) by submission	Tag team match	4:54
3	Tomoaki Honma and Shota Umino defeated House of Torture (Dick Togo and Evil) by submission	Tag team match	7:13
4	United Empire (Callum Newman, Francesco Akira and Great-O-Khan) defeated Los Ingobernables de Japón (Bushi, Tetsuya Naito and Shingo Takagi) by pinfall	Six-man tag team match	8:31
5	Henare defeated Hirooki Goto by pinfall	B Block singles match in the G1 Climax tournament	12:46
6	David Finlay (with Gedo) defeated El Phantasmo (with Jado) by pinfall	B Block singles match in the G1 Climax tournament	12:32
7	Konosuke Takeshita defeated Ren Narita (with Evil and Dick Togo) by pinfall	B Block singles match in the G1 Climax tournament	16:48
8	Yota Tsuji defeated Jeff Cobb by pinfall	B Block singles match in the G1 Climax tournament	11:36

=== Night 17 ===
The seventeenth night of the tournament took place on August 15, 2024, at Makuhari Messe in Mihama-ku, Chiba.

No.	Results	Stipulations	Times
1	Just 5 Guys (Taka Michinoku, Sanada, Taichi and Douki) defeated Bishamon (Hirooki Goto and Yoshi-Hashi), Tomoaki Honma and Katsuya Murashima by pinfall	Eight-man tag team match	7:14
2	Oleg Boltin and Be-Bop Tag Team (Hiroshi Tanahashi and Toru Yano) defeated House of Torture (Yoshinobu Kanemaru, Sho and Yujiro Takahashi) by pinfall	Six-man tag team match	8:54
3	Bullet Club War Dogs (Gabe Kidd and Jake Lee) defeated United Empire (Francesco Akira and Jeff Cobb) by pinfall	Tag team match	6:57
4	United Empire (Callum Newman and Henare) defeated Los Ingobernables de Japón (Bushi and Tetsuya Naito) by submission	Tag team match	6:10
5	House of Torture (Ren Narita, Dick Togo and Evil) defeated Jado, El Phantasmo and Shota Umino by pinfall	Six-man tag team match	7:44
6	TMDK (Zack Sabre Jr. and Hartley Jackson) defeated Bullet Club War Dogs (Gedo and David Finlay) by pinfall	Tag team match	9:33
7	Shingo Takagi defeated Great-O-Khan by pinfall	Quarter-final singles match in the G1 Climax tournament	20:49
8	Yota Tsuji defeated Konosuke Takeshita by pinfall	Quarter-final singles match in the G1 Climax tournament	21:29

=== Night 18 ===
The eighteenth night of the tournament took place on August 17, 2024, at Ryōgoku Kokugikan in Sumida, Tokyo.

No.	Results	Stipulations	Times
1	TMDK (Mikey Nicholls and Robbie Eagles) defeated Yoshi-Hashi and Shoma Kato by pinfall	Tag team match	9:25
2	Bullet Club War Dogs (Gabe Kidd and Jake Lee) defeated Hirooki Goto and Tomoaki Honma by pinfall	Tag team match	7:41
3	United Empire (Callum Newman and Jeff Cobb) and Konosuke Takeshita defeated Jado, El Phantasmo and Shota Umino by pinfall	Six-man tag team match	8:32
4	House of Torture (Yoshinobu Kanemaru, Sho, Yujiro Takahashi, Ren Narita and Evil) defeated Ryusuke Taguchi, Tiger Mask, Oleg Boltin and Be-Bop Tag Team (Hiroshi Tanahashi and Toru Yano) by pinfall	Ten-man tag team match	9:44
5	Bullet Club (Clark Connors, Drilla Moloney and Taiji Ishimori) defeated Just 5 Guys (Taka Michinoku, Taichi and Douki) by submission	Six-man tag team match	8:02
6	United Empire (Francesco Akira, Great-O-Khan and Henare) defeated Los Ingobernables de Japón (Bushi, Hiromu Takahashi and Tetsuya Naito) by submission	Six-man tag team match	9:12
7	Yota Tsuji defeated David Finlay (with Gedo) by pinfall	Semi-final singles match in the G1 Climax tournament	28:04
8	Zack Sabre Jr. defeated Shingo Takagi by submission	Semi-final singles match in the G1 Climax tournament	27:36

=== Night 19 ===
The nineteenth and final night of the tournament took place on August 18, 2024, at Ryōgoku Kokugikan in Sumida, Tokyo.

No.	Results	Stipulations	Times
1	Ryusuke Taguchi and Tencozy (Satoshi Kojima and Hiroyoshi Tenzan) defeated Shoma Kato, Tiger Mask and Yuji Nagata by submission	Six-man tag team match	8:12
2	Taichi defeated Katsuya Murashima by pinfall	Singles match	7:15
3	TMDK (Mikey Nicholls and Robbie Eagles) (with Kosei Fujita) defeated Francesco Akira and Konosuke Takeshita by pinfall	Tag team match	9:29
4	Bullet Club (Clark Connors, Drilla Moloney and Taiji Ishimori) defeated Just 5 Guys (Taka Michinoku, Sanada and Douki) by pinfall	Six-man tag team match	8:57
5	Tomoaki Honma and Bishamon (Hirooki Goto and Yoshi-Hashi) defeated Bullet Club War Dogs (Gabe Kidd, Jake Lee and David Finlay) by pinfall	Six-man tag team match	9:36
6	House of Torture (Yoshinobu Kanemaru, Sho, Yujiro Takahashi, Ren Narita and Evil) defeated El Phantasmo, Shota Umino, Oleg Boltin and Be-Bop Tag Team (Hiroshi Tanahashi and Toru Yano) by pinfall	Ten-man tag team match	8:48
7	Los Ingobernables de Japón (Tetsuya Naito, Bushi, Shingo Takagi and Hiromu Takahashi) defeated United Empire (Callum Newman, Great-O-Khan, Henare and Jeff Cobb) by pinfall	Eight-man tag team match	11:40
8	Zack Sabre Jr. (with Kosei Fujita, Robbie Eagles and Mikey Nicholls) defeated Yota Tsuji by submission	G1 Climax 34 tournament final	31:03

== Blocks ==
Standings
Block A		Block B	
Zack Sabre Jr.	14	David Finlay	12
Shingo Takagi	10	Konosuke Takeshita	10
Great-O-Khan	10	Yota Tsuji	10
Evil	10	Ren Narita	10
Tetsuya Naito	10	Jeff Cobb	10
Jake Lee	8	Henare	8
Sanada	8	Hirooki Goto	8
Gabe Kidd	8	Oleg Boltin	8
Shota Umino	8	Yuya Uemura (withdrawn)	8
Callum Newman	4	El Phantasmo	6

Block A	Evil	Kidd	Lee	Naito	Newman	O-Khan	Sanada	Sabre	Takagi	Umino
Evil	—N/a	Evil (10:19)	Evil (11:20)	Evil (16:11)	Evil (8:40)	O-Khan (16:25)	Evil (18:04)	Sabre (0:19)	Takagi (16:57)	Umino (19:46)
Kidd	Evil (10:19)	—N/a	Lee (4:53)	Naito (14:08)	Kidd (4:51)	Kidd (12:01)	Sanada (11:14)	Sabre (16:19)	Kidd (13:50)	Kidd (15:56)
Lee	Evil (11:20)	Lee (4:53)	—N/a	Naito (17:02)	Lee (11:14)	O-Khan (11:19)	Lee (4:57)	Sabre (17:46)	Takagi (13:49)	Lee (16:03)
Naito	Evil (15:11)	Naito (14:08)	Naito (17:03)	—N/a	Naito (6:55)	O-Khan (18:57)	Naito (17:43)	Sabre (16:03)	Takagi (23:23)	Naito (14:47)
Newman	Evil (8:40)	Kidd (4:51)	Lee (11:14)	Naito (6:55)	—N/a	O-Khan (8:16)	Sanada (8:41)	Sabre (11:56)	Newman (12:51)	Newman (9:45)
O-Khan	O-Khan (16:21)	Kidd (12:01)	O-Khan (11:19)	O-Khan (18:57)	O-Khan (8:16)	—N/a	O-Khan (11:11)	Sabre (11:10)	Takagi (11:04)	Umino (15:06)
Sanada	Evil (18:06)	Sanada (11:14)	Lee (4:57)	Naito (17:43)	Sanada (8:41)	O-Khan (11:11)	—N/a	Sabre (15:44)	Sanada (19:45)	Sanada (15:57)
Sabre	Sabre (0:19)	Sabre (16:19)	Sabre (17:46)	Sabre (16:03)	Sabre (11:56)	Sabre (11:10)	Sabre (15:44)	—N/a	Takagi (16:13)	Umino (19:13)
Takagi	Takagi (16:57)	Kidd (13:50)	Takagi (13:49)	Takagi (23:23)	Newman (12:51)	Takagi (11:04)	Sanada (19:45)	Takagi (16:13)	—N/a	Umino (18:22)
Umino	Umino (19:46)	Kidd (15:56)	Lee (16:03)	Naito (14:47)	Newman (9:45)	Umino (15:06)	Sanada (15:57)	Umino (19:13)	Umino (18:22)	—N/a
Block B	Cobb	Finlay	Goto	Henare	Narita	Boltin	Phantasmo	Takeshita	Tsuji	Uemura
Cobb	—N/a	Finlay (11:39)	Cobb (7:24)	Cobb (12:40)	Narita (12:02)	Cobb (10:09)	Cobb (11:12)	Takeshita (10:28)	Tsuji (11:36)	Cobb (12:29)
Finlay	Finlay (11:39)	—N/a	Goto (17:47)	Finlay (16:09)	Finlay (11:01)	Finlay (12:44)	Finlay (12:32)	Finlay (18:22)	Tsuji (19:50)	Uemura (16:22)
Goto	Cobb (7:24)	Goto (17:47)	—N/a	Henare (12:46)	Narita (12:19)	Goto (10:17)	Phantasmo (13:04)	Goto (14:04)	Goto (17:05)	Uemura (12:38)
Henare	Cobb (12:40)	Finlay (16:09)	Henare (12:46)	—N/a	Narita (13:17)	Henare (8:07)	Henare (9:26)	Takeshita (13:19)	Tsuji (15:37)	Henare (15:33)
Narita	Narita (12:02)	Finlay (11:01)	Narita (12:19)	Narita (13:17)	—N/a	Boltin (7:46)	Narita (14:16)	Takeshita (16:48)	Tsuji (20:21)	Narita (11:47)
Boltin	Cobb (10:09)	Finlay (12:44)	Goto (10:17)	Henare (8:07)	Boltin (7:46)	—N/a	Boltin (12:16)	Boltin (12:09)	Tsuji (10:06)	Boltin (Forfeit)
Phantasmo	Cobb (11:12)	Finlay (12:32)	Phantasmo (13:04)	Henare (9:26)	Narita (14:16)	Boltin (12:16)	—N/a	Takeshita (17:21)	Phantasmo (17:57)	Phantasmo (14:21)
Takeshita	Takeshita (10:28)	Finlay (18:22)	Goto (14:04)	Takeshita (13:19)	Takeshita (16:48)	Boltin (12:09)	Takeshita (17:21)	—N/a	Takeshita (17:14)	Uemura (23:10)
Tsuji	Tsuji (11:36)	Tsuji (19:50)	Goto (17:05)	Tsuji (15:37)	Tsuji (20:21)	Tsuji (10:06)	Phantasmo (17:57)	Takeshita (17:14)	—N/a	Uemura (16:09)
Uemura	Cobb (12:29)	Uemura (16:22)	Uemura (12:38)	Henare (15:33)	Narita (11:47)	Boltin (Forfeit)	Phantasmo (14:21)	Uemura (23:10)	Uemura (16:09)	—N/a

Quarterfinals
A2	Shingo Takagi	Pin
A3	Great-O-Khan	20:49
B2	Konosuke Takeshita	21:29
B3	Yota Tsuji	Pin

Semifinals
A1	Zack Sabre Jr.	Sub
A2	Shingo Takagi	27:36
B1	David Finlay	28:05
B3	Yota Tsuji	Pin

Finals
A1	Zack Sabre Jr.	Sub
B3	Yota Tsuji	31:04
