= Wrestle Kingdom 20 =

2026 New Japan Pro-Wrestling event

- Promotional poster featuring images of Hiroshi Tanahashi throughout his career
- Promotion: New Japan Pro-Wrestling
- Date: January 4, 2026
- City: Tokyo, Japan
- Venue: Tokyo Dome
- Attendance: 46,913

Event chronology
← Previous; World Tag League 2025	Next → New Year Dash!!

Wrestle Kingdom chronology
← Previous; 19	Next → 21

Wrestle Kingdom 20 was a professional wrestling event promoted by New Japan Pro-Wrestling (NJPW). The event took place on January 4, 2026 at the Tokyo Dome, in Tokyo, Japan. It was the 35th January 4 Tokyo Dome Show and the 20th promoted under the Wrestle Kingdom name.

It was the first January 4 Tokyo Dome show to be aired on TV Asahi in Japan since 2004 and was also broadcast live on the NJPW World streaming service. Wrestle Kingdom 20 featured the final match of Hiroshi Tanahashi's 25-year professional wrestling career, the professional wrestling debut of former judoka Olympic gold medalist Aaron Wolf, the NJPW debuts of DDT Pro Wrestling's Chris Brookes and Kaisei Takechi, and the NJPW return of Andrade El Ídolo, who last wrestled in NJPW as La Sombra back in 2015. The event also marked the NJPW returns of Jake Lee, Francesco Akira, Jay White, Will Ospreay, Kenny Omega, Kota Ibushi, Katsuyori Shibata, Keiji Muto, Tatsumi Fujinami, Tetsuya Naito, and Bushi.

Nine matches were contested at the event, with two taking place on the pre-show. In the main event, Kazuchika Okada defeated Hiroshi Tanahashi. In other prominent matches, Yota Tsuji defeated Konosuke Takeshita in a Winner Takes All match to win the IWGP World Heavyweight Championship and retain the IWGP Global Heavyweight Championship, Aaron Wolf defeated Evil to win the NEVER Openweight Championship, United Empire (Callum Newman, Great-O-Khan, Henare, Andrade El Ídolo, and Jake Lee) defeated Bullet Club War Dogs (David Finlay, Gabe Kidd, and Drilla Moloney) and Unaffiliated (Shingo Takagi and Hiromu Takahashi) in a ten-man tag team match, and Syuri defeated Saya Kamitani in a Winner Takes All match to retain the IWGP Women's Championship and win the Strong Women's Championship.

== Production ==
Other on-screen personnel
Role:	Name:
English Commentators	Walker Stewart
English Commentators	Chris Charlton
English Commentators	Rocky Romero (Guest)
Japanese Commentators	Shinpei Nogami
Japanese Commentators	Milano Collection A.T.
Japanese Commentators	Katsuhiko Kanazawa
Japanese Commentators	Kazuyoshi Sakai
Japanese Commentators	Maika (Guest)
Japanese Commentators	Toru Yano (Guest)
Japanese Commentators	Masahiro Chono (Guest)
Ring announcers	Taisei Watanabe
Ring announcers	Makoto Abe
Referees
Referees	Daichi Murayama
Referees	Kenta Sato
Referees	Yuya Sakamoto
Referees	Marty Asami
Referees	Red Shoes Unno

=== Background ===
The January 4 Tokyo Dome Show is NJPW's biggest annual event and has been called "the largest professional wrestling show in the world outside of the United States" and the "Japanese equivalent to the Super Bowl". The show has been promoted under the Wrestle Kingdom name since 2007.

Wrestle Kingdom 20 was announced on October 14, 2024 at King of Pro-Wrestling by NJPW president Hiroshi Tanahashi; who would retire from in-ring competition at the event.

On June 23, 2025, NJPW announced that they signed former Olympic judoka gold medalist Aaron Wolf and that he would make his pro wrestling debut at Wrestle Kingdom 20.

On October 2, NJPW announced that over 20,000 tickets had been sold in the first day of onsale, with sales increasing to over 31,000 by November 3. By November 16, the event was completely sold out; as a result, NJPW announced they'd be expanding the seating plan in order to release more tickets, which went on sale on November 30.

== Results ==
No.	Results	Stipulations	Times
1^{P}	Katsuya Murashima and Masatora Yasuda defeated Shoma Kato and Tatsuya Matsumoto by submission	Tag team match	6:19
2^{P}	El Phantasmo (c) (with Jado) defeated Chris Brookes by pinfall	Singles match for the NJPW World Television Championship	11:48
3	TMDK (Zack Sabre Jr., Ryohei Oiwa, and Hartley Jackson) won last eliminating Boltin Oleg and Bishamon (Hirooki Goto and Yoshi-Hashi) (Note: Other participants in order of elimination: Bullet Club War Dogs (Clark Connors, Oskar, and Yuto-Ice), Tiger Mask, Togi Makabe, and Ryusuke Taguchi, Team 150 (Tomohiro Ishii, Taichi and Satoshi Kojima), Kaisei Takechi, Shota Umino and Yuya Uemura), Toru Yano, Master Wato and Yoh (c), and House of Torture (Ren Narita, Sanada, and Yoshinobu Kanemaru).)	Ranbo for the NEVER Openweight 6-Man Tag Team Championship	20:43
4	Syuri (IWGP) defeated Saya Kamitani (Strong) by pinfall	Winner Takes All match for the IWGP Women's Championship and Strong Women's Championship	12:10
5	United Empire (Callum Newman, Great-O-Khan, Henare, Andrade El Ídolo, and Jake Lee) (with Jakob Austin Young) defeated Bullet Club War Dogs (David Finlay, Gabe Kidd, and Drilla Moloney) and Unaffiliated (Shingo Takagi and Hiromu Takahashi) (with Gedo) by pinfall	Ten-man tag team match	14:40
6	El Desperado defeated Kosei Fujita, Taiji Ishimori, and Sho (with Yoshinobu Kanemaru) by pinfall	Four-way match to determine the #1 contender for IWGP Junior Heavyweight Championship	8:25
7	Aaron Wolf defeated Evil (c) (with Dick Togo, Don Fale, Sanada, Yujiro Takahashi and Ren Narita) by technical submission	Singles match for the NEVER Openweight Championship; This was Wolf's professional wrestling debut.	12:10
8	Yota Tsuji (Global) defeated Konosuke Takeshita (World) (with Rocky Romero) by submission	Winner Takes All match for the IWGP World Heavyweight Championship and IWGP Global Heavyweight Championship	29:30
9	Kazuchika Okada (with Gedo) defeated Hiroshi Tanahashi by pinfall	Singles match This was Tanahashi's retirement match.	33:00
(c) / – the champion(s) heading into the match; P / – the match was broadcast on the pre-show
