= G1 Climax 35 =

2025 edition of the G1 Climax

- Promotional poster of the tournament
- Promotion: New Japan Pro-Wrestling
- Date: July 19 – August 17, 2025
- City: See venues
- Venue: See venues

Event chronology
← Previous; New Japan Soul	Next → AEW x NJPW: Forbidden Door

G1 Climax chronology
← Previous; G1 Climax 34	Next → G1 Climax 36

G1 Climax 35
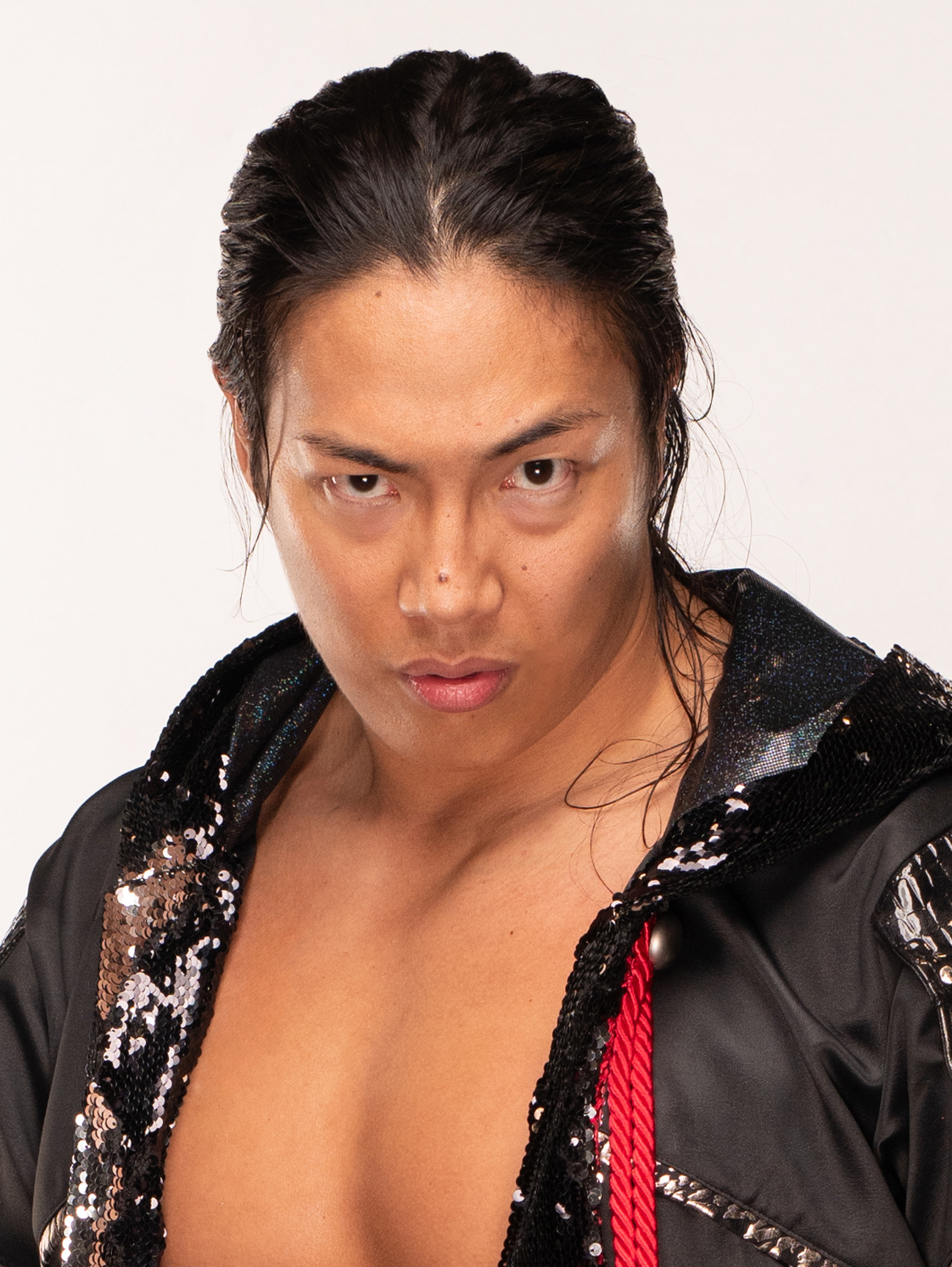
- Konosuke Takeshita, winner of G1 Climax 35

Tournament information
- Sport: Professional wrestling
- Location: Japan
- Dates: July 19, 2025–August 17, 2025
- Tournament format: Two-block round-robin tournament
- Participants: 20

Final positions
- Champion: Konosuke Takeshita
- Runner-up: Evil

Tournament statistics
- Bouts fought: 87

The G1 Climax 35 was a professional wrestling tournament promoted by New Japan Pro-Wrestling (NJPW). The tournament commenced on July 19 and concluded on August 17, 2025. It was the thirty-fifth edition of G1 Climax, and the fifty-first edition of the tournament, counting its previous forms under different names.

Considered NJPW's most important tournament, the G1 Climax features 20 wrestlers, divided into two blocks of ten ("A" and "B"). Each participant will face all nine other wrestlers within the same block in singles matches. The winner of each block will be determined via a point system, with two points for a win, one point each for a draw, and no points for a defeat. Each night of the event seen matches from two blocks per night. On the final three days of the event, top 3 wrestlers in each block will advance and will enter into a six-man playoff, with the block winners earning a bye into the semifinals to determine the winner of the tournament, who also receives a future match for the IWGP World Heavyweight Championship.

== Production ==
=== Tournament rules ===
The tournament features 20 wrestlers, divided into two blocks of ten ("A" and "B"). Each participant faces all nine other wrestlers within the same block in singles matches. The winner of each block is determined via a point system, with two points for a win, one point for a draw, and no points for a loss; each night of the event sees one match from each block between two members competing for the tournament. In case of several wrestlers sharing the top score, the results of the matches those wrestlers had when facing each other in the tournament act as a tiebreaker, with the one having the most wins over the other top-scorers determining the winner of the block.

On the final three days of the event, top 3 wrestlers in each block advances and enter into a six-man playoff, with the block winners earning a bye into the semifinals to determine the winner of the G1 Climax, who would gain a future match for the IWGP World Heavyweight Championship, NJPW's top championship, at Wrestle Kingdom, NJPW's biggest yearly event; if the IWGP Heavyweight Champion himself wins, he selects his opponent at Wrestle Kingdom. The matches of the tournament have a 30-minutes time limit (with the time limit being reached resulting in a tie); the quarterfinals (2nd and 3rd places of the block), the semifinal (block winners and quarterfinals winners), and final (semifinal winners) matches, where a winner must be determined, have no time limit.

=== History ===
On April 7, 2025, after Sakura Genesis, NJPW officially announced the 2025 edition of the tournament will take place between July 19 and August 17; as usual, the tournament will take place over several cities and locations across Japan.

=== Storylines ===
The event includes matches that result from scripted storylines, where wrestlers portray heroes, villains, or less distinguishable characters in scripted events that build tension and culminate in a wrestling match or series of matches.

=== Venues ===
The venue list was announced on April 7, 2025, after Sakura Genesis.

Dates	Venue	Location	Block play
July 19	Hokkai Kitayell	Sapporo, Hokkaido	A and B
July 20	Hokkai Kitayell	Sapporo, Hokkaido	A and B
July 22	Sendai Sun Plaza Hall	Sendai, Miyagi	A
July 23	City Hall Plaza Aore Nagaoka	Nagaoka, Niigata	B
July 25	Ota City General Gymnasium	Ōta, Tokyo	A
July 26	Ota City General Gymnasium	Ōta, Tokyo	B
July 27	Port Messe Nagoya	Nagoya, Aichi	A
July 30	Yamato Arena	Suita, Osaka	B
August 1	Sun Messe Kagawa	Takamatsu, Kagawa	A
August 2	Hiroshima Sun Plaza	Nishi-ku, Hiroshima	B
August 3	Fukuoka Convention Center	Hakata-ku, Fukuoka	A
August 5	Intex Osaka	Suminoe-ku, Osaka	B
August 7	Korakuen Hall	Bunkyo, Tokyo	A
August 8	Yokohama Budokan	Naka-ku, Yokohama	B
August 10	G Messe Gunma	Takasaki, Gunma	A
August 13	Act City Hamamatsu	Hamamatsu, Shizuoka	B
August 14	Korakuen Hall	Bunkyo, Tokyo	Playoffs
August 16	Ariake Arena	Kōtō, Tokyo	Semifinals
August 17	Ariake Arena	Kōtō, Tokyo	Final

== Participants ==
New Japan Pro-Wrestling announced the sixteen pre-qualified participants at Dominion on June 15. A day later, they announced the eight wrestlers who would wrestle in a play-in tournament for the remaining four slots. On June 25, NJPW announced that Don Fale, who was scheduled to compete in a play-in match against Ryohei Oiwa, had pulled out due to a family tragedy, and was replaced by Satoshi Kojima. On July 5, NJPW announced that Hirooki Goto had sustained an elbow injury during his IWGP World Heavyweight Championship defence on June 29 and would have to withdraw; his spot in the tournament will be filled by the winner of a gauntlet match between the four play-in tournament losers.

Block	Wrestler	Unit	Notes
A	Boltin Oleg	Main Unit	NEVER Openweight Champion. 2nd appearance.
A	Evil	House of Torture	10th appearance.
A	David Finlay	Bullet Club War Dogs	4th appearance.
A	Callum Newman	United Empire	2nd appearance.
A	Ryohei Oiwa	TMDK	Debutant.
A	Sanada	House of Torture	10th appearance.
A	Taichi	Main Unit	IWGP Tag Team Champion. 6th appearance.
A	Hiroshi Tanahashi	Main Unit	Three-time G1 Climax winner (17, 25, 28). 23rd and final appearance.
A	Yota Tsuji	Unaffiliated	3rd appearance.
A	Yuya Uemura	Main Unit	2nd appearance.
B	El Phantasmo	Main Unit	NJPW World Television Champion. 4th appearance.
B	Gabe Kidd	Bullet Club War Dogs	IWGP Global Heavyweight Champion. 3rd appearance.
B	Drilla Moloney	Bullet Club War Dogs	Debutant.
B	Ren Narita	House of Torture	3rd appearance.
B	Great-O-Khan	United Empire	5th appearance.
B	Zack Sabre Jr.	TMDK	IWGP World Heavyweight Champion. G1 Climax winner (34). 9th appearance.
B	Shingo Takagi	Unaffiliated	7th appearance.
B	Konosuke Takeshita	Don Callis Family (AEW/DDT)	2nd appearance.
B	Shota Umino	Main Unit	3rd appearance.
B	Yoshi-Hashi	Main Unit	8th appearance.
Play-in tournament
A	Satoshi Kojima	Main Unit	Prospective 16th appearance. Replaced Don Fale, who withdrew from the play-in tournament for personal reasons.
B	Tomohiro Ishii	Main Unit	Strong Openweight and IWGP Tag Team Champion. Prospective 12th appearance.
B	Chase Owens	House of Torture	Prospective 4th appearance.
Withdrew before the tournament
A	Don Fale	House of Torture	Prospective 8th appearance. Withdrew due to personal reasons; replaced in the play-in tournament by Satoshi Kojima.
A	Hirooki Goto	Main Unit	G1 Climax winner (18). Prospective 18th appearance. Withdrew due to an elbow injury.

== Results ==
=== Play-in tournament ===
New Japan Soul, Night 5 (June 23, Korakuen Hall, Tokyo; qualifying matches only)
No.	Results	Stipulations	Times
1	Drilla Moloney defeated Tomohiro Ishii by pinfall	Singles match to determine qualification to the B Block in the G1 Climax tournament	17:10
2	Callum Newman defeated Taichi by pinfall	Singles match to determine qualification to the A Block in the G1 Climax tournament	23:32

New Japan Soul, Night 8 (July 4, Nippon Budokan, Tokyo; qualifying matches only)
No.	Results	Stipulations	Times
1	Ryohei Oiwa defeated Satoshi Kojima	Singles match to determine qualification to the A Block in the G1 Climax tournament	9:45
2	Yoshi-Hashi defeated Chase Owens	Singles match to determine qualification to the B Block in the G1 Climax tournament	12:02

New Japan Soul, Night 9 (July 6, Korakuen Hall, Tokyo; qualifying match only)
No.	Results	Stipulations	Times
1	Taichi defeated Tomohiro Ishii, Chase Owens and Satoshi Kojima	Last Chance Gauntlet match to determine qualification to the A Block in the G1 Climax tournament	17:33

=== Night 1 ===
The first night took place at the Hokkaido Prefectural Sports Center in Sapporo, Hokkaido on July 19, 2025.

No.	Results	Stipulations	Times
1	Yoshi-Hashi defeated Shingo Takagi by pinfall	B Block singles match in the G1 Climax tournament	4:45
2	Evil (with Dick Togo and Don Fale) defeated Callum Newman by submission	A Block singles match in the G1 Climax tournament	9:02
3	Drilla Moloney defeated Great-O-Khan by pinfall	B Block singles match in the G1 Climax tournament	9:08
4	Yuya Uemura defeated Boltin Oleg by pinfall	A Block singles match in the G1 Climax tournament	11:03
5	Shota Umino defeated El Phantasmo by pinfall	B Block singles match in the G1 Climax tournament	11:29
6	Ryohei Oiwa defeated David Finlay (with Gedo) by pinfall	A Block singles match in the G1 Climax tournament	13:10
7	Konosuke Takeshita defeated Gabe Kidd by referee stoppage	B Block singles match in the G1 Climax tournament	13:15
8	Yota Tsuji defeated Sanada by pinfall	A Block singles match in the G1 Climax tournament	5:11
9	Ren Narita defeated Zack Sabre Jr. by pinfall	B Block singles match in the G1 Climax tournament	16:14
10	Hiroshi Tanahashi defeated Taichi by pinfall	A Block singles match in the G1 Climax tournament	20:21

=== Night 2 ===
The second night took place at the Hokkaido Prefectural Sports Center in Sapporo, Hokkaido on July 20, 2025.

After his match with Konosuke Takeshita the previous night, Gabe Kidd sustained a hyperextended knee injury and withdrew from his scheduled matches on Night 2 and Night 3 against Zack Sabre Jr., and Shingo Takagi, before officially withdrawing from the tournament.

No.	Results	Stipulations	Times
1	Callum Newman defeated Hiroshi Tanahashi by pinfall	A Block singles match in the G1 Climax tournament	7:32
2	Drilla Moloney defeated Shota Umino by pinfall	B Block singles match in the G1 Climax tournament	12:30
3	Boltin Oleg defeated Ryohei Oiwa by pinfall	A Block singles match in the G1 Climax tournament	9:10
4	Yoshi-Hashi defeated Ren Narita by pinfall	B Block singles match in the G1 Climax tournament	1:26
5	David Finlay (with Gedo) defeated Sanada by pinfall	A Block singles match in the G1 Climax tournament	10:21
6	Great-O-Khan defeated Shingo Takagi (with Daiki Nagai) by pinfall	B Block singles match in the G1 Climax tournament	12:12
7	Evil (with Dick Togo and Don Fale) defeated Yota Tsuji (with Daiki Nagai) by pinfall	A Block singles match in the G1 Climax tournament	11:01
8	El Phantasmo defeated Konosuke Takeshita (with Rocky Romero) by pinfall	B Block singles match in the G1 Climax tournament	15:02
9	Taichi defeated Yuya Uemura by pinfall	A Block singles match in the G1 Climax tournament	19:02

=== Night 3 ===
The third night took place at the Sendai Sun Plaza Hall in Sendai, Miyagi on July 22, 2025.

No.	Results	Stipulations	Times
1	Bullet Club War Dogs (Drilla Moloney and Taiji Ishimori) defeated Shoma Kato and Yoshi-Hashi by submission	Tag team match	6:30
2	House of Torture (Ren Narita and Yoshinobu Kanemaru) defeated El Phantasmo and Jado by submission	Tag team match	6:08
3	The Don Callis Family (Konosuke Takeshita and Rocky Romero) defeated United Empire (Great-O-Khan and Jakob Austin Young) by pinfall	Tag team match	7:30
4	TMDK (Zack Sabre Jr. and Hartley Jackson) defeated Shota Umino and Katsuya Murashima by pinfall	Tag team match	8:53
5	Ryohei Oiwa defeated Callum Newman by pinfall	A Block singles match in the G1 Climax tournament	10:24
6	Boltin Oleg defeated Hiroshi Tanahashi by pinfall	A Block singles match in the G1 Climax tournament	9:50
7	Sanada defeated Evil (with Dick Togo and Don Fale) by pinfall	A Block singles match in the G1 Climax tournament	6:33
8	Taichi defeated David Finlay (with Gedo) by pinfall	A Block singles match in the G1 Climax tournament	13:35
9	Yota Tsuji defeated Yuya Uemura by pinfall	A Block singles match in the G1 Climax tournament	16:56

=== Night 4 ===
The fourth night took place at Aore Nagaoka in Nagaoka, Niigata on July 23, 2025.

No.	Results	Stipulations	Times
1	Boltin Oleg and Toru Yano defeated House of Torture (Sanada and Yoshinobu Kanemaru) by pinfall	Tag team match	6:01
2	United Empire (Callum Newman and Jakob Austin Young) defeated Yuya Uemura and Shoma Kato by pinfall	Tag team match	6:42
3	House of Torture (Evil and Dick Togo) (with Don Fale) defeated Taichi and Masatora Yasuda by submission	Tag team match	6:30
4	TMDK (Ryohei Oiwa and Hartley Jackson) defeated Yota Tsuji and Daiki Nagai defeated by pinfall	Tag team match	6:25
5	Hiroshi Tanahashi and Katsuya Murashima defeated Bullet Club War Dogs (David Finlay and Gedo) defeated by submission	Tag team match	7:56
6	Yoshi-Hashi defeated Drilla Moloney by pinfall	B Block singles match in the G1 Climax tournament	11:32
7	Ren Narita defeated El Phantasmo (with Jado) by pinfall	B Block singles match in the G1 Climax tournament	9:50
8	Konosuke Takeshita defeated Great-O-Khan by pinfall	B Block singles match in the G1 Climax tournament	17:05
9	Shota Umino defeated Zack Sabre Jr. by pinfall	B Block singles match in the G1 Climax tournament	22:10

=== Night 5 ===
The fifth night took place at Ota City General Gymnasium in Ōta, Tokyo on July 25, 2025.

No.	Results	Stipulations	Times
1	United Empire (Great-O-Khan and Jakob Austin Young) defeated Yoshi-Hashi and Shoma Kato by pinfall	Tag team match	7:40
2	El Phantasmo and Jado defeated TMDK (Zack Sabre Jr. and Hartley Jackson) by pinfall	Tag team match	6:37
3	House of Torture (Ren Narita and Yoshinobu Kanemaru) defeated Shota Umino and Tomoaki Honma by pinfall	Tag team match	7:07
4	The Don Callis Family (Konosuke Takeshita and Rocky Romero) defeated Shingo Takagi and Daiki Nagai by submission	Tag team match	7:32
5	Boltin Oleg defeated Sanada by pinfall	A Block singles match in the G1 Climax tournament	9:57
6	Yuya Uemura defeated Callum Newman by pinfall	A Block singles match in the G1 Climax tournament	10:32
7	Evil (with Dick Togo and Don Fale) defeated Taichi by pinfall	A Block singles match in the G1 Climax tournament	10:31
8	Yota Tsuji defeated Ryohei Oiwa by pinfall	A Block singles match in the G1 Climax tournament	13:43
9	Hiroshi Tanahashi defeated David Finlay (with Gedo) by pinfall	A Block singles match in the G1 Climax tournament	16:02

=== Night 6 ===
The sixth night took place at Ota City General Gymnasium in Ōta, Tokyo on July 26, 2025. In addition to the wrestling matches, the event also included a ten-bell salute and tribute ceremony to international wrestling legend, 1983 IWGP League tournament winner and inaugural IWGP champion Hulk Hogan, who died at 71 two days prior.

No.	Results	Stipulations	Times
1	Boltin Oleg and Toru Yano defeated Yota Tsuji and Daiki Nagai by pinfall	Tag team match	4:44
2	United Empire (Callum Newman and Jakob Austin Young) defeated Bullet Club War Dogs (David Finlay and Gedo) by pinfall	Tag team match	5:41
3	House of Torture (Sanada and Yoshinobu Kanemaru) defeated Taichi and Masatora Yasuda by submission	Tag team match	8:25
4	House of Torture (Evil and Dick Togo) (with Don Fale) defeated Yuya Uemura and Tomoaki Honma by pinfall	Tag team match	7:33
5	TMDK (Ryohei Oiwa and Hartley Jackson) defeated Hiroshi Tanahashi and Katsuya Murashima by pinfall	Tag team match	6:54
6	Great-O-Khan defeated Yoshi-Hashi by pinfall	B Block singles match in the G1 Climax tournament	12:27
7	Zack Sabre Jr. defeated El Phantasmo by submission	B Block singles match in the G1 Climax tournament	19:20
8	Ren Narita defeated Shota Umino by pinfall	B Block singles match in the G1 Climax tournament	17:45
9	Konosuke Takeshita defeated Shingo Takagi by referee stoppage	B Block singles match in the G1 Climax tournament	23:56

=== Night 7 ===
The seventh night took place at Port Messe Nagoya in Nagoya, Aichi on July 27, 2025.

No.	Results	Stipulations	Times
1	El Phantasmo and Jado defeated United Empire (Great-O-Khan and Jakob Austin Young) by pinfall	Tag team match	8:03
2	Shota Umino and Katsuya Murashima defeated Shingo Takagi and Daiki Nagai by submission	Tag team match	7:07
3	Bullet Club War Dogs (Gedo and Taiji Ishimori) defeated House of Torture (Ren Narita and Yoshinobu Kanemaru) by pinfall	Tag team match	6:32
4	TMDK (Zack Sabre Jr. and Hartley Jackson) defeated The Don Callis Family (Konosuke Takeshita and Rocky Romero) by pinfall	Tag team match	9:01
5	Yota Tsuji defeated Boltin Oleg by pinfall	A Block singles match in the G1 Climax tournament	10:03
6	Callum Newman defeated David Finlay (with Gedo) by pinfall	A Block singles match in the G1 Climax tournament	10:32
7	Sanada (with Yoshinobu Kanemaru) defeated Taichi by pinfall	A Block singles match in the G1 Climax tournament	14:05
8	Yuya Uemura defeated Evil (with Dick Togo and Don Fale) by pinfall	A Block singles match in the G1 Climax tournament	13:42
9	Ryohei Oiwa defeated Hiroshi Tanahashi by pinfall	A Block singles match in the G1 Climax tournament	14:20

=== Night 8 ===
The eighth night took place at Yamato Arena in Suita, Osaka on July 30, 2025.

No.	Results	Stipulations	Times
1	Yota Tsuji and Daiki Nagai defeated Taichi and Masatora Yasuda by submission	Tag team match	7:11
2	Yuya Uemura and Shoma Kato defeated Hiroshi Tanahashi and Katsuya Murashima by submission	Tag team match	9:02
3	House of Torture (Sanada and Yoshinobu Kanemaru) defeated United Empire (Callum Newman and Jakob Austin Young) by pinfall	Tag team match	6:43
4	TMDK (Ryohei Oiwa and Hartley Jackson) defeated House of Torture (Evil and Dick Togo) (with Don Fale) by submission	Tag team match	5:57
5	Boltin Oleg and Toru Yano defeated Bullet Club War Dogs (David Finlay ans Gedo) by pinfall	Tag team match	6:23
6	Great-O-Khan defeated El Phantasmo by pinfall	B Block singles match in the G1 Climax tournament	14:50
7	Drilla Moloney defeated Ren Narita (with Yoshinobu Kanemaru) by pinfall	B Block singles match in the G1 Climax tournament	9:52
8	Shingo Takagi defeated Shota Umino by pinfall	B Block singles match in the G1 Climax tournament	22:45
9	Zack Sabre Jr. defeated Konosuke Takeshita by submission	B Block singles match in the G1 Climax tournament	22:37

=== Night 9 ===
The ninth night took place at Sun Messe Kagawa in Takamatsu, Kagawa on August 1, 2025.

No.	Results	Stipulations	Times
1	Shota Umino and Katsuya Murashima defeated Yoshi-Hashi and Shoma Kato by pinfall	Tag team match	7:09
2	Bullet Club War Dogs (Drilla Moloney and Taiji Ishimori) defeated The Don Callis Family (Konosuke Takeshita and Rocky Romero) by submission	Tag team match	7:24
3	El Phantasmo and Jado defeated Shingo Takagi and Daiki Nagai by pinfall	Tag team match	5:55
4	TMDK (Zack Sabre Jr. and Hartley Jackson) defeated United Empire (Great-O-Khan and Jakob Austin Young) by pinfall	Tag team match	6:42
5	Callum Newman defeated Sanada by pinfall	A Block singles match in the G1 Climax tournament	10:11
6	Evil (with Dick Togo and Don Fale) defeated Ryohei Oiwa by pinfall	A Block singles match in the G1 Climax tournament	9:27
7	David Finlay (with Gedo) defeated Boltin Oleg by pinfall	A Block singles match in the G1 Climax tournament	10:52
8	Taichi defeated Yota Tsuji by pinfall	A Block singles match in the G1 Climax tournament	15:58
9	Yuya Uemura defeated Hiroshi Tanahashi by pinfall	A Block singles match in the G1 Climax tournament	18:40

=== Night 10 ===
The tenth night took place at Hiroshima Sun Plaza in Nishi-ku, Hiroshima on August 2, 2025.

No.	Results	Stipulations	Times
1	Boltin Oleg and Toru Yano defeated United Empire (Callum Newman and Jakob Austin Young) by pinfall	Tag team match	3:58
2	TMDK (Ryohei Oiwa and Hartley Jackson) defeated Taichi and Masatora Yasuda by pinfall	Tag team match	8:12
3	House of Torture (Sanada and Yoshinobu Kanemaru) defeated Yuya Uemura and Shoma Kato by submission	Tag team match	7:22
4	Hiroshi Tanahashi and Katsuya Murashima defeated Yota Tsuji and Daiki Nagai by submission	Tag team match	6:38
5	House of Torture (Evil and Dick Togo) defeated Bullet Club War Dogs (David Finlay and Gedo) by submission	Tag team match	5:22
6	Shota Umino defeated Yoshi-Hashi by pinfall	B Block singles match in the G1 Climax tournament	13:30
7	Shingo Takagi defeated El Phantasmo by pinfall	B Block singles match in the G1 Climax tournament	14:27
8	Konosuke Takeshita defeated Drilla Moloney by pinfall	B Block singles match in the G1 Climax tournament	14:01
9	Zack Sabre Jr. defeated Great-O-Khan by submission	B Block singles match in the G1 Climax tournament	20:01

=== Night 11 ===
The eleventh night took place at Fukuoka Convention Center in Hakata-ku, Fukuoka on August 3, 2025.

No.	Results	Stipulations	Times
1	The Don Callis Family (Konosuke Takeshita and Rocky Romero) defeated Yoshi-Hashi and Shoma Kato by pinfall	Tag team match	8:13
2	House of Torture (Ren Narita and Yoshinobu Kanemaru) defeated United Empire (Great-O-Khan and Jakob Austin Young) by submission	Tag team match	7:16
3	Bullet Club War Dogs (Drilla Moloney and Taiji Ishimori) defeated El Phantasmo and Jado by pinfall	Tag team match	6:05
4	TMDK (Zack Sabre Jr. and Hartley Jackson) defeated Shingo Takagi and Daiki Nagai by pinfall	Tag team match	7:16
5	Boltin Oleg defeated Callum Newman by pinfall	A Block singles match in the G1 Climax tournament	10:54
6	Ryohei Oiwa defeated Taichi by pinfall	A Block singles match in the G1 Climax tournament	11:50
7	Sanada defeated Yuya Uemura by pinfall	A Block singles match in the G1 Climax tournament	11:41
8	David Finlay (with Gedo) defeated Evil (with Dick Togo and Don Fale) by pinfall	A Block singles match in the G1 Climax tournament	10:31
9	Hiroshi Tanahashi defeated Yota Tsuji by pinfall	A Block singles match in the G1 Climax tournament	16:46

=== Night 12 ===
The twelfth night took place at Intex Osaka in Suminoe-ku, Osaka on August 5, 2025.

No.	Results	Stipulations	Times
1	United Empire (Callum Newman and Jakob Austin Young) defeated Taichi and Masatora Yasuda by pinfall	Tag team match	7:55
2	Boltin Oleg and Toru Yano defeated House of Torture (Evil and Dick Togo) by pinfall	Tag team match	4:57
3	House of Torture (Sanada and Yoshinobu Kanemaru) defeated Hiroshi Tanahashi and Katsuya Murashima by submission	Tag team match	6:27
4	TMDK (Ryohei Oiwa and Hartley Jackson) defeated Yuya Uemura and Shoma Kato by pinfall	Tag team match	6:01
5	Bullet Club War Dogs (David Finlay and Gedo) defeated Yota Tsuji and Daiki Nagai by pinfall	Tag team match	6:36
6	Konosuke Takeshita defeated Yoshi-Hashi by pinfall	B Block singles match in the G1 Climax tournament	15:13
7	Ren Narita defeated Great-O-Khan by submission	B Block singles match in the G1 Climax tournament	12:13
8	El Phantasmo (with Jado) defeated Drilla Moloney by pinfall	B Block singles match in the G1 Climax tournament	5:03
9	Zack Sabre Jr. defeated Shingo Takagi (with Daiki Nagai) by pinfall	B Block singles match in the G1 Climax tournament	20:53

=== Night 13 ===
The thirteenth night took place at Korakuen Hall in Bunkyō, Tokyo on August 7, 2025.

No.	Results	Stipulations	Times
1	El Phantasmo and Jado defeated Yoshi-Hashi and Shoma Kato by pinfall	Tag team match	5:35
2	TMDK (Zack Sabre Jr. and Hartley Jackson) defeated Bullet Club War Dogs (Drilla Moloney and Taiji Ishimori) by pinfall	Tag team match	7:32
3	House of Torture (Ren Narita and Yoshinobu Kanemaru) defeated Shingo Takagi and Daiki Nagai by submission	Tag team match	6:40
4	The Don Callis Family (Konosuke Takeshita and Rocky Romero) defeated Shota Umino and Tomoaki Honma by submission	Tag team match	5:38
5	Callum Newman defeated Taichi by pinfall	A Block singles match in the G1 Climax tournament	12:50
6	Evil (with Dick Togo and Don Fale) defeated Boltin Oleg by pinfall	A Block singles match in the G1 Climax tournament	9:44
7	Hiroshi Tanahashi defeated Sanada by pinfall	A Block singles match in the G1 Climax tournament	2:48
8	Yuya Uemura defeated Ryohei Oiwa by pinfall	A Block singles match in the G1 Climax tournament	18:23
9	David Finlay (with Gedo) defeated Yota Tsuji by pinfall	A Block singles match in the G1 Climax tournament	15:21

=== Night 14 ===
The fourteenth night took place at Yokohama Budokan in Naka-ku, Yokohama on August 8, 2025.

No.	Results	Stipulations	Times
1	Boltin Oleg and Toru Yano defeated Taichi and Masatora Yasuda by pinfall	Tag team match	6:58
2	House of Torture (Sanada and Yoshinobu Kanemaru) defeated TMDK (Ryohei Oiwa and Hartley Jackson) by disqualification	Tag team match	7:19
3	Yota Tsuji and Daiki Nagai defeated United Empire (Callum Newman and Jakob Austin Young) by pinfall	Tag team match	5:32
4	House of Torture (Evil and Dick Togo) (with Don Fale) defeated Hiroshi Tanahashi and Katsuya Murashima by submission	Tag team match	5:44
5	Yuya Uemura and Tomoaki Honma defeated Bullet Club War Dogs (David Finlay and Gedo) by submission	Tag team match	5:26
6	El Phantasmo defeated Yoshi-Hashi by pinfall	B Block singles match in the G1 Climax tournament	12:30
7	Zack Sabre Jr. defeated Drilla Moloney by submission	B Block singles match in the G1 Climax tournament	14:01
8	Shingo Takagi defeated Ren Narita (with Yoshinobu Kanemaru) by pinfall	B Block singles match in the G1 Climax tournament	17:10
9	Shota Umino defeated Konosuke Takeshita by pinfall	B Block singles match in the G1 Climax tournament	25:46

=== Night 15 ===
The fifteenth night took place at G Messa Gunma in Takasaki, Gunma on August 10, 2025.

No.	Results	Stipulations	Times
1	Bullet Club War Dogs (Drilla Moloney and Taiji Ishimori) defeated Shingo Takagi and Daiki Nagai by submission	Tag team match	7:26
2	TMDK (Zack Sabre Jr. and Hartley Jackson) defeated Yoshi-Hashi and Shoma Kato by pinfall	Tag team match	7:30
3	United Empire (Great-O-Khan and Jakob Austin Young) defeated Shota Umino and Katsuya Murashima by pinfall	Tag team match	7:30
4	House of Torture (Ren Narita and Yoshinobu Kanemaru) defeated The Don Callis Family (Konosuke Takeshita and Rocky Romero) by submission	Tag team match	6:25
5	Boltin Oleg defeated Taichi by pinfall	A Block singles match in the G1 Climax tournament	12:14
6	Sanada defeated Ryohei Oiwa by pinfall	A Block singles match in the G1 Climax tournament	10:26
7	Yota Tsuji defeated Callum Newman by pinfall	A Block singles match in the G1 Climax tournament	11:17
8	Evil defeated Hiroshi Tanahashi by pinfall	A Block singles match in the G1 Climax tournament	12:50
9	David Finlay (with Gedo) defeated Yuya Uemura	A Block singles match in the G1 Climax tournament	23:01

=== Night 16 ===
The sixteenth night took place at Act City Hamamatsu in Hamamatsu, Shizuoka on August 13, 2025.

No.	Results	Stipulations	Times
1	Hiroshi Tanahashi and Katsuya Murashima defeated Taichi and Masatora Yasuda by submission	Tag team match	8:18
2	TMDK (Ryohei Oiwa and Hartley Jackson) defeated United Empire (Callum Newman and Jakob Austin Young) by pinfall	Tag team match	6:22
3	Boltin Oleg and Toru Yano defeated House of Torture (Sanada and Yoshinobu Kanemaru) by pinfall	Tag team match	5:30
4	Yota Tsuji and Daiki Nagai defeated Yuya Uemura and Shoma Kato by submission	Tag team match	6:38
5	House of Torture (Evil and Dick Togo) (with Don Fale) defeated Bullet Club War Dogs (David Finlay and Gedo) by pinfall	Tag team match	4:31
6	Shingo Takagi defeated Drilla Moloney by pinfall	B Block singles match in the G1 Climax tournament	12:06
7	Zack Sabre Jr. defeated Yoshi-Hashi by submission	B Block singles match in the G1 Climax tournament	17:36
8	Shota Umino defeated Great-O-Khan by pinfall	B Block singles match in the G1 Climax tournament	12:05
9	Konosuke Takeshita (with Rocky Romero) defeated Ren Narita by referee stoppage	B Block singles match in the G1 Climax tournament	20:50

=== Night 17 ===
The seventeenth night, including the playoff round of the tournament, took place at Korakuen Hall in Bunkyo, Tokyo on August 14, 2025.

No.	Results	Stipulations	Times
1	Taichi and Satoshi Kojima defeated Yoshi-Hashi and Shoma Kato by pinfall	Tag team match	7:02
2	House of Torture (Yoshinobu Kanemaru, Yujiro Takahashi, Sanada and Ren Narita) defeated El Phantasmo, Boltin Oleg, Toru Yano and Jado by submission	Eight-man tag team match	6:45
3	United Empire (Callum Newman, Great-O-Khan and Jakob Austin Young) defeated Hiroshi Tanahashi, Yuya Uemura and Katsuya Murashima by pinfall	Six-man tag team match	8:37
4	Bullet Club War Dogs (Drilla Moloney and Taiji Ishimori) defeated Shingo Takagi and Daiki Nagai by submission	Tag team match	7:40
5	House of Torture (Evil, Dick Togo and Don Fale) defeated TMDK (Zack Sabre Jr., Ryohei Oiwa and Hartley Jackson) by pinfall	Six-man tag team match	7:05
6	Konosuke Takeshita (with Rocky Romero) defeated David Finlay (with Gedo) by pinfall	G1 Climax tournament playoff match	17:12
7	Yota Tsuji defeated Shota Umino by pinfall	G1 Climax tournament playoff match	28:18

=== Night 18 ===
The eighteenth night, including the semifinal round of the tournament, took place at Ariake Arena in Tokyo, Japan on August 16, 2025.

No.	Results	Stipulations	Times
1^{P}	Togi Makabe, Tiger Mask and Tatsuya Matsumoto defeated Shoma Kato, Masatora Yasuda and Zane Jay by submission	Six-man tag team match	9:48
2	Shota Umino, Yuya Uemura, Yoshi-Hashi, El Desperado and Ryusuke Taguchi defeated Taichi, Satoshi Kojima, Toru Yano and Spiritech (Master Wato and Yoh) by pinfall	Ten-man tag team match	8:54
3	House of Torture (Don Fale and Yujiro Takahashi) defeated Boltin Oleg and Tomoaki Honma by pinfall	Tag team match	4:28
4	United Empire (Callum Newman, Great-O-Khan and Jakob Austin Young) defeated Hiroshi Tanahashi, El Phantasmo and Katsuya Mirashima (with Jado) by pinfall	Six-man tag team match	9:34
5	Shingo Takagi and Daiki Nagai defeated Bullet Club War Dogs (David Finlay and Gedo) by submission	Tag team match	6:34
6	House of Torture (Sanada and Yoshinobu Kanemaru) defeated Bullet Club War Dogs (Drilla Moloney and Taiji Ishimori) by pinfall	Tag team match	6:25
7	House of Torture (Ren Narita, Sho, and Douki)) defeated TMDK (Kosei Fujita, Ryohei Oiwa and Hartley Jackson) by submission	Six-man tag team match	8:30
8	Evil (with Dick Togo and Don Fale) defeated Yota Tsuji (with Shingo Takagi and Daiki Nagai) by referee stoppage	G1 Climax tournament semifinal	18:02
9	Konosuke Takeshita (with Rocky Romero) defeated Zack Sabre Jr. by pinfall	G1 Climax tournament semifinal	26:46
P / – the match was broadcast on the pre-show

=== Night 19 ===
The nineteenth and final night, including the final of the tournament, took place at Ariake Arena in Tokyo, Japan on August 17, 2025.

No.	Results	Stipulations	Times
1	Masatora Yasuda and Zane Jay defeated Shoma Kato and Tatsuya Matsumoto by submission	Tag team match	6:27
2	Satoshi Kojima and Taichi defeated Katsuya Mirashima and Togi Makabe by pinfall	Tag team match	7:14
3	Toru Yano and Spiritech (Master Wato and Yoh) defeated El Desperado, Ryusuke Taguchi, and Yoshi-Hashi by pinfall	Six-man tag team match	6:40
4	House of Torture (Yoshinobu Kanemaru, Sanada, and Don Fale) defeated El Phantasmo, Boltin Oleg, and Tiger Mask (with Jado) by pinfall	Six-man tag team match	6:58
5	Hiroshi Tanahashi, Shota Umino, and Yuya Uemura defeated United Empire (Callum Newman, Great-O-Khan, and Jakob Austin Young) by pinfall	Six-man tag team match	8:24
6	Bullet Club War Dogs (David Finlay, Drilla Moloney, Gedo, and Taiji Ishimori) defeated Daiki Nagai, Shingo Takagi, Hiromu Takahashi, and Yota Tsuji by pinfall	Eight-man tag team match	10:10
7	House of Torture (Ren Narita, Yujiro Takahashi, Douki, and Sho)) defeated TMDK (Zack Sabre Jr., Hartley Jackson, Kosei Fujita, and Ryohei Oiwa) by pinfall	Eight-man tag team match	10:59
8	Konosuke Takeshita (with Rocky Romero) defeated Evil (with Dick Togo, Don Fale, Ren Narita, Sho, Yujiro Takahashi, Yoshinobu Kanemaru, Douki, and Sanada) by pinfall	G1 Climax tournament final	26:26

== Blocks ==
Final standings
Block A		Block B	
Evil	12	Zack Sabre Jr.	14
David Finlay	10	Shota Umino	12
Yota Tsuji	10	Konosuke Takeshita	12
Yuya Uemura	10	Shingo Takagi	10
Boltin Oleg	10	Ren Narita	10
Hiroshi Tanahashi	8	Great-O-Khan	8
Callum Newman	8	Drilla Moloney	8
Ryohei Oiwa	8	El Phantasmo	8
Sanada	8	Yoshi-Hashi	8
Taichi	6	Gabe Kidd	0

Tournament overview
Block A	Boltin	Evil	Finlay	Newman	Oiwa	Sanada	Taichi	Tanahashi	Tsuji	Uemura
Boltin	—N/a	Evil (9:44)	Finlay (10:52)	Boltin (10:54)	Boltin (9:10)	Boltin (9:57)	Boltin (12:14)	Boltin (9:50)	Tsuji (10:03)	Uemura (11:03)
Evil	Evil (9:44)	—N/a	Finlay (10:32)	Evil (9:02)	Evil (9:27)	Sanada (6:33)	Evil (10:31)	Evil (12:50)	Evil (11:01)	Uemura (13:42)
Finlay	Finlay (10:52)	Finlay (10:32)	—N/a	Newman (10:31)	Oiwa (13:10)	Finlay (10:21)	Taichi (13:35)	Tanahashi (16:02)	Finlay (15:21)	Finlay (23:01)
Newman	Boltin (10:54)	Evil (9:02)	Newman (10:31)	—N/a	Oiwa (10:24)	Newman (10:11)	Newman (12:50)	Newman (7:32)	Tsuji (11:17)	Uemura (10:32)
Oiwa	Boltin (9:10)	Evil (9:27)	Oiwa (13:10)	Oiwa (10:24)	—N/a	Sanada (10:26)	Oiwa (11:50)	Oiwa (14:20)	Tsuji (13:43)	Uemura (18:23)
Sanada	Boltin (9:57)	Sanada (6:33)	Finlay (10:21)	Newman (10:11)	Sanada (10:26)	—N/a	Sanada (14:05)	Tanahashi (2:48)	Tsuji (5:11)	Sanada (11:41)
Taichi	Boltin (12:14)	Evil (10:31)	Taichi (13:35)	Newman (12:50)	Oiwa (11:50)	Sanada (14:05)	—N/a	Tanahashi (20:21)	Taichi (15:58)	Taichi (19:02)
Tanahashi	Boltin (9:50)	Evil (12:50)	Tanahashi (16:02)	Newman (7:32)	Oiwa (14:20)	Tanahashi (2:48)	Tanahashi (20:21)	—N/a	Tanahashi (16:46)	Uemura (18:40)
Tsuji	Tsuji (10:03)	Evil (11:01)	Finlay (15:21)	Tsuji (11:17)	Tsuji (13:43)	Tsuji (5:11)	Taichi (15:58)	Tanahashi (16:46)	—N/a	Tsuji (16:56)
Uemura	Uemura (11:03)	Uemura (13:42)	Finlay (23:01)	Uemura (10:32)	Uemura (18:23)	Sanada (11:41)	Taichi (19:02)	Uemura (18:40)	Tsuji (16:56)	—N/a
Block B	Phantasmo	Kidd	Moloney	Narita	O-Khan	Sabre Jr.	Takagi	Takeshita	Umino	Yoshi-Hashi
Phantasmo	—N/a	Phantasmo (Forfeit)	Phantasmo (5:03)	Narita (9:50)	O-Khan (14:50)	Sabre Jr. (19:20)	Takagi (14:27)	Phantasmo (15:02)	Umino (11:29)	Phantasmo (12:30)
Kidd	Phantasmo (Forfeit)	—N/a	Moloney (Forfeit)	Narita (Forfeit)	O-Khan (Forfeit)	Sabre Jr. (Forfeit)	Takagi (Forfeit)	Takeshita (13:15)	Umino (Forfeit)	Yoshi-Hashi (Forfeit)
Moloney	Phantasmo (5:03)	Moloney (Forfeit)	—N/a	Moloney (9:52)	Moloney (9:08)	Sabre Jr. (14:01)	Takagi (12:06)	Takeshita (14:01)	Moloney (12:30)	Yoshi-Hashi (11:32)
Narita	Narita (9:50)	Narita (Forfeit)	Moloney (9:52)	—N/a	Narita (12:13)	Narita (16:14)	Takagi (17:10)	Takeshita (20:50)	Narita (17:45)	Yoshi-Hashi (1:26)
O-Khan	O-Khan (14:50)	O-Khan (Forfeit)	Moloney (9:08)	Narita (12:13)	—N/a	Sabre Jr. (20:01)	O-Khan (12:12)	Takeshita (17:05)	Umino (12:05)	O-Khan (12:27)
Sabre Jr.	Sabre Jr. (19:20)	Sabre Jr. (Forfeit)	Sabre Jr. (14:01)	Narita (16:14)	Sabre Jr. (20:01)	—N/a	Sabre Jr. (20:53)	Sabre Jr. (22:37)	Umino (22:10)	Sabre Jr. (17:36)
Takagi	Takagi (14:27)	Takagi (Forfeit)	Takagi (12:06)	Takagi (17:10)	O-Khan (12:12)	Sabre Jr. (20:53)	—N/a	Takeshita (23:56)	Takagi (22:45)	Yoshi-Hashi (4:45)
Takeshita	Phantasmo (15:02)	Takeshita (13:15)	Takeshita (14:01)	Takeshita (20:50)	Takeshita (17:05)	Sabre Jr. (22:37)	Takeshita (23:56)	—N/a	Umino (25:46)	Takeshita (15:13)
Umino	Umino (11:29)	Umino (Forfeit)	Moloney (12:30)	Narita (17:45)	Umino (12:05)	Umino (22:10)	Takagi (22:45)	Umino (25:46)	—N/a	Umino (13:30)
Yoshi-Hashi	Phantasmo (12:30)	Yoshi-Hashi (Forfeit)	Yoshi-Hashi (11:32)	Yoshi-Hashi (1:26)	O-Khan (12:27)	Sabre Jr. (17:36)	Yoshi-Hashi (4:45)	Takeshita (15:13)	Umino (13:30)	—N/a

Playoffs; August 14; Korakuen Hall, Tokyo
B2	Shota Umino	28:18
A3	Yota Tsuji	Pin
A2	David Finlay	17:12
B3	Konosuke Takeshita	Pin

Semifinals; August 16; Ariake Arena, Tokyo
A1	Evil	TKO
A3	Yota Tsuji	18:02
B1	Zack Sabre Jr.	26:46
B3	Konosuke Takeshita	Pin

Final; August 17; Ariake Arena, Tokyo
A1	Evil	26:26
B3	Konosuke Takeshita	Pin
