= Callum Newman =

English professional wrestler (born 2002)

- Newman in October 2026

Personal information
- Born: Callum Joseph Newman; 31 August 2002 (age 24) Havering, London, England

Professional wrestling career
- Ring names: Callum Newman; Dark Britannico (II); Tomar Vuelo
- Billed height: 1.85 m (6 ft 1 in)
- Billed weight: 102 kg (225 lb; 16 st 1 lb)
- Billed from: Romford, Essex, England
- Trained by: Garry Vanderhorn; Greg Burridge; London School of Lucha Libre; Rampage Brown; Toni Granzi; Will Ospreay
- Debut: December 2017

Callum Joseph Newman (born 31 August 2002) is an English professional wrestler. He is signed to New Japan Pro-Wrestling (NJPW), (Note: When wrestling in Japan, his ring name is written in katakana as カラム・ニューマン (Karamu Nyūman).) where he is the leader of the NJPW branch of the United Empire and overall leader of the stable. He also makes sporadic appearances for partner promotion All Elite Wrestling (AEW) and on the British independent circuit.

Newman began his professional wrestling career in 2017 under the mentorship of Will Ospreay. He would mainly perform in the British independent scene for promotions such as London Lucha League (LLL), Revolution Pro Wrestling (RevPro), and Progress Wrestling. In 2023, Newman signed with NJPW and joined the United Empire. He would become the leader of the stable in 2025 after incumbent leaders Ospreay and TJP left NJPW. As leader, he would become a two-time IWGP Tag Team Champion and the 2026 New Japan Cup winner, the latter of which led to him becoming a one-time IWGP Heavyweight Champion, becoming the youngest wrestler to win both the tournament and the championship.

== Early life ==
Callum Joseph Newman was born in Havering, London on 31 August 2002. He initially began training to become a professional wrestler at the age of seven under his grandfather, Toni Granzi, one of the UK's most renowned heel wrestlers of the 1950s and 1960s. He had an unofficial debut match at age 13 but later took a hiatus from wrestling to focus on football. As a footballer, he played for Tottenham Hotspur's youth academy and was also scouted by Arsenal and West Ham United, but ultimately quit the sport due to a lack of passion and chose return to professional wrestling. At the age of 15, he was also planning to quit professional wrestling altogether but attended a two-day professional wrestling seminar near his home as a surprise from his parents, where he met Will Ospreay, who was able to convince him and his parents to continue his training at the London School of Lucha Libre as his protege.

== Professional wrestling career ==
=== British independent circuit (2017–present) ===
Newman made his official in-ring debut in December 2017 on the British independent scene. Newman initially wrestled under the name Tomar Vuelo and briefly wrestled under a mask as Dark Britannico (the second wrestler to portray this character after Will Ospreay) before switching to using his real name soon after. In May 2019, Newman was awarded the inaugural WrestleTalk Scholarship, which included coaching from Rampage Brown, a personal graphic designer for his social media branding, merchandise, and wrestling gear, brand-new wrestling attire funded by WrestleTalk, £2,000 in cash, and the services of an accountant from the London-based firm Streets Accountants. Newman continued wrestle on the British independent scene for promotions such as London Lucha League (LLL), Revolution Pro Wrestling (RevPro), and Progress Wrestling until 2023, where he was recruited by Ospreay to join him in Japan. Newman made his return to RevPro at RevPro Live in London 81 on January 7, 2024, where he was defeated by JJ Gale. Newman would continue to make sporadic appearances for RevPro in 2024, 2025 and 2026.

=== New Japan Pro-Wrestling (2023–present) ===
==== Early beginnings (2023–2025) ====
On 8 September 2023, at Road to Destruction, Newman made his debut for New Japan Pro-Wrestling (NJPW) as a member of the United Empire and the protégé of the group's leader, Will Ospreay. He competed in an eight-man tag team match with his stablemates against Los Ingobernables de Japón, ending in defeat. Newman would spend the majority of the year competing in tag matches with the United Empire before earning his first singles victory in NJPW on 3 December against Shoma Kato.

Newman entered the 2024 New Japan Cup, where he lost to Gabe Kidd in the first round. On July 5, he defeated Yoshi-Hashi in the final of a six-man qualifying tournament to secure one of two remaining spots in the 2024 G1 Climax. He competed in the tournament from July to August, finishing with a record of two wins and seven losses, failing to advance to the knockout stage. Newman later teamed with stabelmate Jeff Cobb in the 2024 World Tag League. The pair competed in A Block and finished with six points before Newman suffered a knee injury during their final block match against TMDK (Ryohei Oiwa and Zack Sabre Jr.) on December 5, forcing him to withdraw from the tournament.

In March 2025, Newman returned from injury and participated in the 2025 New Japan Cup, where he lost to Tetsuya Naito in the first round.

==== Leader of the United Empire (2025–present) ====
On April 4 at Sakura Genesis, Newman and Cobb defeated Tetsuya Naito and Hiromu Takahashi to win the IWGP Tag Team Championship, marking Newman's first ever championship in a major promotion. Their reign lasted nine days before the titles were vacated following Cobb's departure from NJPW. Afterward, Newman declared himself the new leader of the United Empire and challenged Hirooki Goto for the IWGP World Heavyweight Championship at Wrestling Dontaku. On April 26, at Wrestling Redzone in Hiroshima, Newman and Great-O-Khan defeated Bishamon (Hirooki Goto and Yoshi-Hashi) to win the vacant IWGP Tag Team Championship. On 4 May at Wrestling Dontaku, Newman failed to defeat Goto for the world heavyweight title. At Dominion 6.15 in Osaka-jo Hall, Newman and O-Khan lost their titles to Taichi and Tomohiro Ishii, ending their reign at 50 days. Newman then entered the 2025 G1 Climax after defeating Taichi in the play-in. Competing in A Block, he finished with eight points and failed to advance to the knockout stage. Following the tournament, Newman entered into a rivalry with Bullet Club War Dogs leader David Finlay, blaming him for the United Empire's decline following the events of The New Beginning in Osaka in 2024, which culminated in Ospreay's departure from NJPW. During this period, Newman gradually adopted a more ruthless, aggressive, and arrogant persona.

On January 4, 2026, at Wrestle Kingdom 20, Newman teamed with Great-O-Khan, Henare, and new United Empire recruits Andrade El Idolo and Jake Lee to defeat the alliance of Bullet Club War Dogs (David Finlay, Gabe Kidd, and Drilla Moloney) and the unaffiliated team of Shingo Takagi and Hiromu Takahashi in a ten-man tag team match. Following the victory, Newman and the United Empire attacked their opponents, completing the group's heel turn Following the event, he entered into a storyline at New Year Dash!! on January 5 with Will Ospreay, who returned to NJPW and promised to support the stable. Newman later teased attacking Ospreay, but was restrained by Henare and Great-O-Khan. In the same month, Newman announced that he had signed a multi-year deal with NJPW. On February 11 at The New Beginning in Osaka, Newman defeated Finlay to end their feud.

In March 2026, Newman competed and won the New Japan Cup, defeating Oskar in the first round, Hartley Jackson in the second round, Hirooki Goto in the quarterfinals, Shota Umino in the semifinals, and finally Yuya Uemura in the grand finals to become the youngest wrestler ever to win the tournament. At Sakura Genesis on 4 April, Newman defeated Yota Tsuji to become the new IWGP Heavyweight Champion and the youngest wrestler to win the title. On Night 2 of Wrestling Dontaku on 4 May, Newman successfully defended his title against Shingo Takagi. Following the match, tensions between Ospreay and Newman escalated when Newman pressured Ospreay into attacking Takagi and criticized him for aligning himself with the Death Riders in All Elite Wrestling. On June 14 at Dominion 6.14 in Osaka-jo Hall, Newman lost the title back to Yota Tsuji, ending his reign at 71 days. After the event, it was revealed that Newman had suffered a shoulder injury, although he was medically cleared to compete in the G1 Climax.

From July 11 till August 16, Newman participated in G1 Climax (B block) and finished with 12 points (6–3) to qualify for the semis; where he lost to eventual winner Ryohei Oiwa. On the final night of the G1 Climax tour, Newman was confronted by a returning Jeff Cobb, who refused to rejoin United Empire and opted to join Unbound Co. instead. On 27 September at Destruction in Kobe, Newman defeated Cobb. On November 3 at Power Struggle, Newman and Ospreay failed to win the IWGP Tag Team Championship from the Knock Out Brothers (Oskar and Yuto-Ice) after Newman caused a disqualification. Following the match, Newman brawled with Ospreay after months of tension before challenging him to a match at Wrestle Kingdom 21 which Ospreay accepted.

=== All Elite Wrestling (2026–present) ===
Due to NJPW's working relationshiip with All Elite Wrestling (AEW), Newman has made appearances for the promotion since 2026, teaming with his United Empire stablemates against rival stables such as the Death Riders, The Dogs, and The Demand as well as accompanying Will Ospreay to the ring for his AEW World Championship match against Kenny Omega at All In on August 30, 2026.

== Championships and accomplishments ==
- London Lucha League
  - LLL Championship (2 times)
- New Japan Pro-Wrestling
  - IWGP Heavyweight Championship (1 time)
  - IWGP Tag Team Championship (2 times) – with Jeff Cobb (1) and Great-O-Khan (1)
  - New Japan Cup (2026)
- Pro Wrestling Illustrated
  - Ranked No. 14 of the top 500 singles wrestlers in the PWI 500 in 2026
- Reloaded Championship Wrestling Alliance
  - RCWA British Tag Team Championship (1 time) – with Maverick Mayhew
