= Wrestle Kingdom 21 =

2027 New Japan Pro-Wrestling event

- Promotional poster featuring various NJPW wrestlers throughout the promotion's history
- Promotion: New Japan Pro-Wrestling
- Date: January 4, 2027
- City: Tokyo, Japan
- Venue: Tokyo Dome

Event chronology
← Previous; World Tag League 2026	Next → New Year Dash!!

Wrestle Kingdom chronology
← Previous; 20	Next → —

Wrestle Kingdom 21 is an upcoming professional wrestling event promoted by New Japan Pro-Wrestling (NJPW). The event will take place on January 4, 2027 at the Tokyo Dome, in Tokyo, Japan. It will be the 36th January 4 Tokyo Dome Show and the 21st promoted under the Wrestle Kingdom name.

== Production ==
=== Background ===
The January 4 Tokyo Dome Show is NJPW's biggest annual event and has been called "the largest professional wrestling show in the world outside of the United States" and the "Japanese equivalent to the Super Bowl". The show has been promoted under the Wrestle Kingdom name since 2007.

Wrestle Kingdom 21 was announced at the semifinals of the G1 Climax on August 15, 2025.

=== Storylines ===
Wrestle Kingdom 21 will feature professional wrestling matches that involved different wrestlers from pre-existing scripted feuds and storylines. Wrestlers portrayed villains, heroes, or less distinguishable characters in the scripted events that built tension and culminated in a wrestling match or series of matches.

== Matches ==
No.	Matches*	Stipulations
1	Unbound Co. (Taiji Ishimori and Robbie X) vs. Ichiban Sweet Boys (Robbie Eagles and Kosei Fujita) vs. Místico and TBA	Three-way tag team match for the vacant IWGP Junior Heavyweight Tag Team Championship
2	Ryohei Oiwa vs. MJF	Singles match
3	Yoh (c) vs. Sho	Singles match for the IWGP Junior Heavyweight Championship; If Yoh loses, he must leave NJPW. If Sho loses, he must leave House of Torture and reform Roppongi 3K with Yoh.
4	Shingo Takagi vs. Jon Moxley	Unbound Deathmatch
5	Will Ospreay (with Francesco Akira and Henare) vs. Callum Newman (with Jake Lee, Jakob Austin Young, and Zane Jay)	Singles match
6	Zack Sabre Jr. (c) vs. Hechicero	Singles match for the CMLL World Heavyweight Championship
7	Gabe Kidd (c) vs. Yuya Uemura	Singles match for the IWGP Global Heavyweight Championship
8	Yota Tsuji (c) vs. Kenny Omega	Singles match for the IWGP Heavyweight Championship
(c) / – the champion(s) heading into the match; *Card subject to change

== See also ==
- 2027 in professional wrestling
- List of NJPW pay-per-view events
- Professional wrestling at the Tokyo Dome
