= House of Torture =

Professional wrestling stable

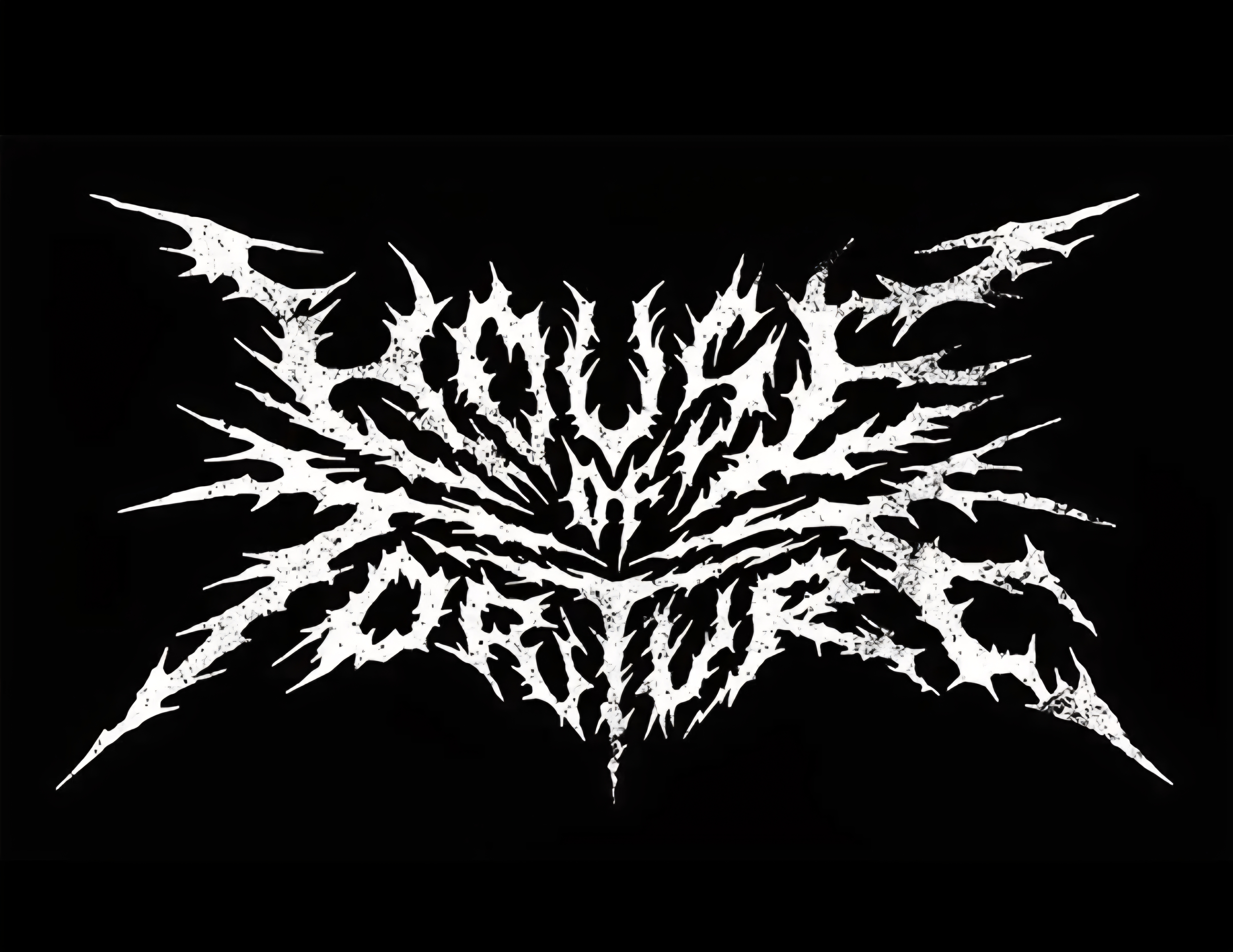
- House of Torture Logo

Stable
- Name: House of Torture
- Leader: Ren Narita (II)
- Members: See below
- Former members: Jack Perry; Evil (I)
- Debut: September 4, 2021
- Years active: 2021–present

House of Torture (HoT) is a professional wrestling stable currently performing for the Japanese promotion New Japan Pro-Wrestling (NJPW). The villainous stable consists of second leader Ren Narita, Chase Owens, Dick Togo, Don Fale, Douki, Sanada, Sho, Shun Skywalker, Yoshinobu Kanemaru, and Yujiro Takahashi.

The stable was initially formed by Evil on September 4, 2021 as a sub-group of Bullet Club, before being kicked out after losing a Dog Pound match to Bullet Club War Dogs at Wrestling Dontaku on May 3, 2025.

== Background ==
The House of Torture was conceived by New Japan Pro-Wrestling (NJPW) in mid 2021, by NJPW booker Dick Togo, who came up with the idea of continuing Evil's long term push as a top star by surrounding him with an entourage, which would lead to an eventual split from the Bullet Club, after he had filled in as the temporary top representative member, due to Jay White's travel restrictions as a result of the COVID-19 pandemic, with White still serving as the recognized official leader. Sho, who became one of the founding members of the stable, was eager to work a singles career alongside Yoh, both were pushing for a split of Roppongi 3K. Their disbanding was debated internally, with NJPW booker Gedo being initially opposed, due to a variety of reasons including merchandise sales. However, Togo pitched Sho to be part of the stable and was responsible for booking the storyline of the Roppongi 3K split.

== History ==
=== Formation; Evil's leadership (2021–2026) ===
After Evil won the 2020 New Japan Cup, in part due to outside interference by Bullet Club, he defected to the stable, after turning on Los Ingobernables de Japón leader Tetsuya Naito. Evil went on to win the IWGP Heavyweight and IWGP Intercontinental Championships and enlisted a new stablemate, Dick Togo, as his manager and spokesperson. He also temporarily took over as the top representative member of Bullet Club in Jay White's absence due to the restrictions imposed by the COVID-19 pandemic, with White still serving as the recognized official leader. As Evil was still NEVER Openweight 6-Man Tag Team Champion with Bushi and Takagi despite his betrayal, he became the first triple champion in the history of New Japan Pro-Wrestling. Meanwhile, Sho began pursuing his singles career, following his partner Yoh's injury. After a losing streak in August 2021, Sho turned on Yoh, disbanding Roppongi 3K.

Their rivalry culminated into a match on September 4 at Wrestle Grand Slam in MetLife Dome, where Sho defeated his former teammate. Afterwards, Sho was accepted into Bullet Club by Togo, Evil and Yujiro Takahashi. In the aftermath of Sho's addition, he, Togo, Evil and Takahashi formed their own subgroup within the stable, called "House of Torture". The following day, Evil unsuccessfully challenged Shingo Takagi for the IWGP World Heavyweight Championship. On January 5, 2023, at New Year Dash!!, House of Torture (Evil, Togo and Takahashi) attacked Ren Narita, before Minoru Suzuki and his former Suzuki-gun stablemate El Desperado came out for the save. Afterwards, in a post-match interview, Desperado, Suzuki and Narita challenged Evil, Takahashi and Sho for the NEVER Openweight 6-Man Tag Team Championship at The New Beginning in Osaka on February 11. At the event, Evil, Takahashi and Sho lost the titles to Strong Style (Suzuki, Narita and Desperado). Both trios continued feuding with each other over the following months, culminating in a No Countouts match on April 3 during the Road to Sakura Genesis tour, where Evil, Takahashi and Sho failed to regain the titles. The following months, Sho took part in the 2023 Best of the Super Juniors while Evil participated in the 2023 G1 Climax, but they didn't win their tournaments. Following the tournament, on August 13, House of Torture embarked on a feud with Just 5 Guys, where Sho won the Provisional KOPW Championship from Taichi at Destruction in Kobe after Yoshinobu Kanemaru turned on Taichi and the Just 5 Guys stable and jumped to House of Torture. On October 9 at Destruction in Ryogoku, Evil unsuccessfully challenged Sanada for the IWGP World Heavyweight Championship. Five days later, in the final round robin match of the World Tag League, Ren Narita turned on his partner Shota Umino to join the House of Torture.

Starting 2024, HoT won two more championships: Evil won the NEVER Openweight Championship for the third time, while Sho won the IWGP Junior Heavyweight Championship. On March 6 at NJPW's 52nd Anniversary Show, All Elite Wrestling's Jack Perry joined the stable, but silently left the group on May 11 at Resurgence. Despite Evil lost his title to Shingo Takagi at Sakura Genesis, and Sho lost the title on June 16 at New Japan Soul: Night 1 to Desperado in a Steel Cage match at King of Pro-Wrestling, Narita won the NJPW World Television Championship. In August, a storyline began where the two Bullet Club factions (House of Torture and Bullet Club War Dogs), leading to Bullet Club leader David Finlay to expel House of Torture from Bullet Club on September 26, with the stable becoming an independent entity separated from Bullet Club.

On January 4, 2025 at Wrestle Kingdom 19, Narita lost the NJPW World Television Championship to El Phantasmo in a four-way match also involving Cobb and Ryohei Oiwa. On January 30, during the Road to the New Beginning tour, Narita, Sho and Yujiro Takahashi defeated Hiroshi Tanahashi, Toru Yano and Boltin Oleg to win the NEVER Openweight 6-Man Tag Team Championship. On April 5 at Sakura Genesis, Sanada turned on the War Dogs and joined House of Torture. In a post-match interview, Finlay alongside the War Dogs (Kidd, Moloney, Connors and Ishimori) challenged House of Torture (Evil, Narita, Sho, Kanemaru and Sanada) to a Dog Pound match, which was later made official for May 3 at Wrestling Dontaku: Night 1. Finlay later added the stipulation that the losers must leave Bullet Club. At the event, the War Dogs defeated House of Torture, thus HoT were forced to leave Bullet Club. At Dominion 6.15 in Osaka-jo Hall on June 15, 2025, Don Fale, Chase Owens and Douki joined the stable, while Douki and Sho won the IWGP Junior Heavyweight Tag Team Championship that same night, and Evil defeated Finlay in a Dog Collar Deathmatch to end the feud with the War Dogs. On July 4, during the New Japan Soul tour, Narita, Sho and Takahashi lost the NEVER Openweight Six-Man Tag Team Championship to Wato, Yoh and Toru Yano. From July 19 until August 17, Evil, Narita and Sanada participated in G1 Climax 35 (A, B, and A Block respectively); Narita and Sanada failed to advance out of their blocks while Evil made it to the finals but lost to Konosuke Takeshita. At King of Pro-Wrestling on October 13, Evil defeated Boltin Oleg to win his fourth NEVER Openweight Championship. On October 6 at Road to King of Pro Wrestling: Night 2, Douki defeated El Desperado to win his second IWGP Junior Heavyweight Championship. From October 21 till November 2, IWGP Junior Heavyweight Tag Team Champions (Douki and Sho) participated in the 2025 Super Junior Tag League in Block A, finishing with a perfect 5—0 record and won the tournament when they defeated Ishimori and Robbie X, becoming the first team to win the trophy while also being champions.

At Wrestle Kingdom 20 on January 4, 2026, Sho failed to win a four-way match to determine the #1 contender to Douki's IWGP Junior Heavyweight Championship, while Evil lost the NEVER Openweight Championship to Aaron Wolf. At New Year Dash the following night, Douki and Sho lost the IWGP Junior Heavyweight Tag Team Championship in a four-way tag team match to Ichiban Sweet Boys (Robbie Eagles and Kosei Fujita).

=== Ren Narita's leadership (2026–present) ===
On January 25, NJPW announced that Evil would not be renewing his contract and would be leaving the promotion. Shortly after, in an interview for Tokyo Sports, Narita declared he had taken over House of Torture, becoming the new leader. On February 11 at The New Beginning in Osaka, Narita defeated Wolf to win the NEVER Openweight Championship. From March 6 till March 15, Yujiro and Narita participated in the 2026 New Japan Cup, with Yujiro being eliminated in the second round by Shota Umino and Narita beating Taichi and Satoshi Kojima in the first and second round respectively before being knocked out by Boltin Oleg in the quarterfinals. On May 3rd and 4th at Wrestling Dontaku, Narita defeated Oleg to retain the NEVER Openweight Championship, and Konosuke Takeshita defeated Owens to retain the NJPW World Television Championship, with Sanada making his NJPW return after 4 months and attacking Takeshita. From May 14 till June 3, Sho and Kanemaru participated in Best of the Super Juniors 33 (both in the B block), with Sho finishing with 10 points (5–4) and Kanemaru finishing with 6 points (3–6), with both failing to qualify for the semis. From July 11 till August 13, Narita and Sanada participated in G1 Climax 36, with Narita finishing with 10 points (5–4) and Sanada finishing with 8 points (4–5), with both failing to qualify for the semis. On August 15 at G1 Climax 36: Night 18, former Dragongate wrestler Shun Skywalker joined House of Torture. On September 27 at Destruction in Kobe, Skywalker defeated Konosuke Takeshita to win the NJPW World Television Championship.

== Members ==
House of Torture
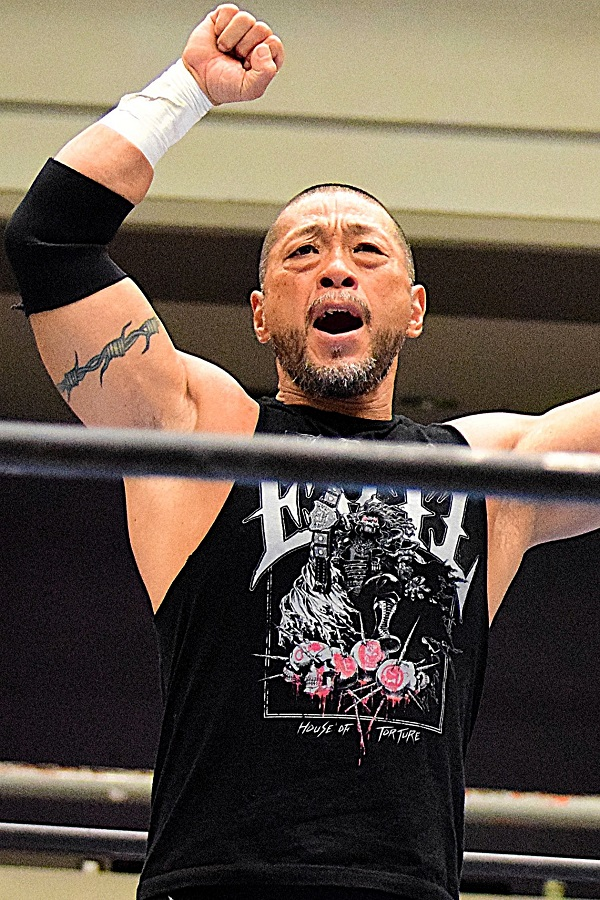
Dick Togo (M)

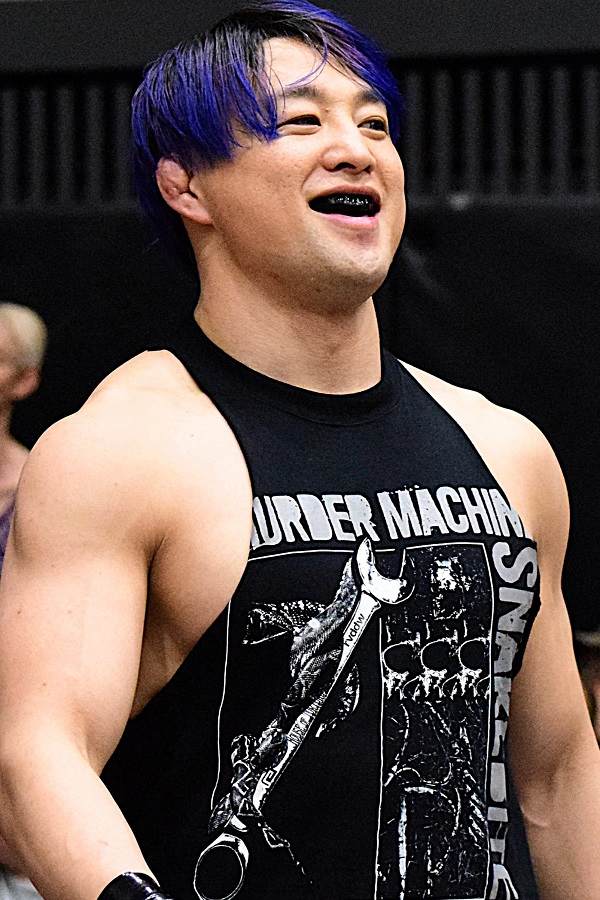
Sho

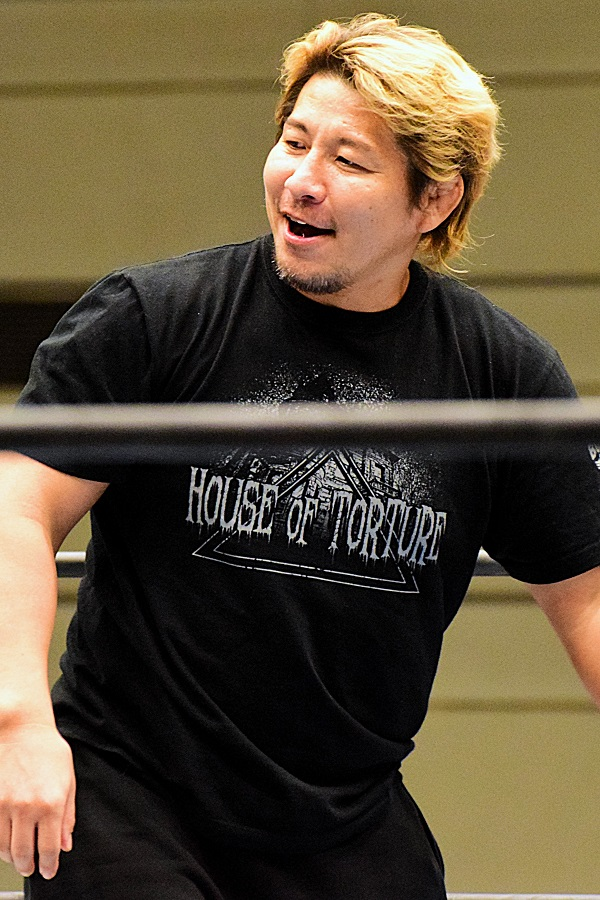
Yujiro Takahashi

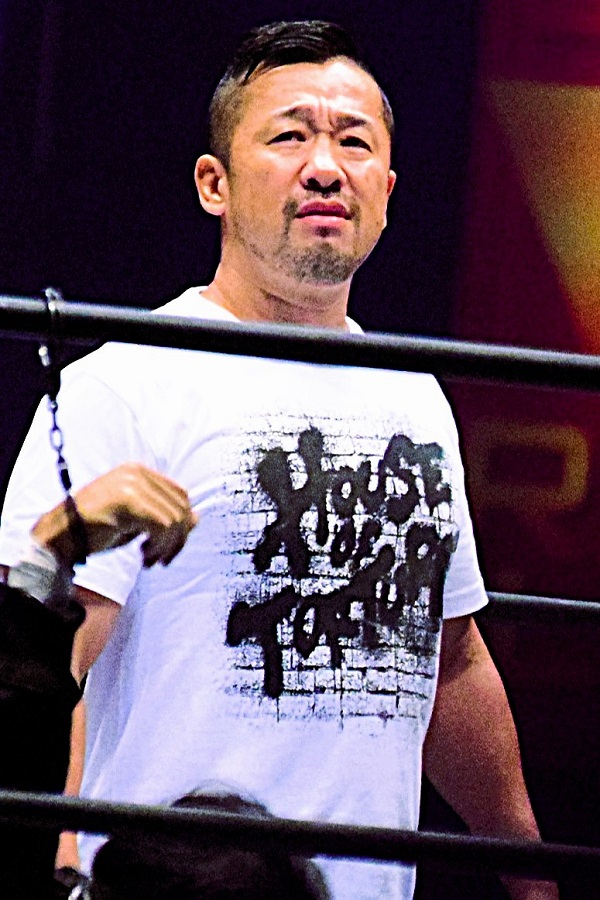
Yoshinobu Kanemaru

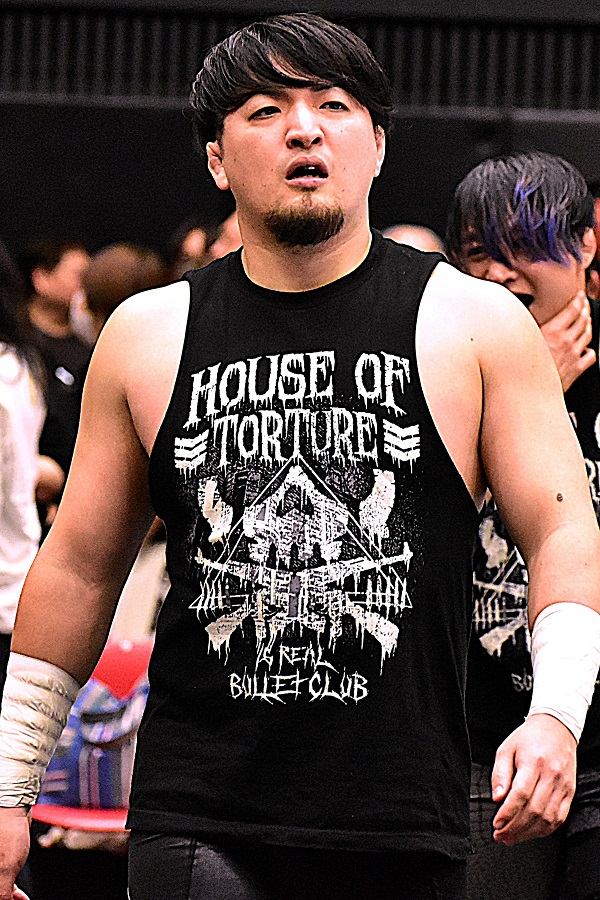
Ren Narita (II)

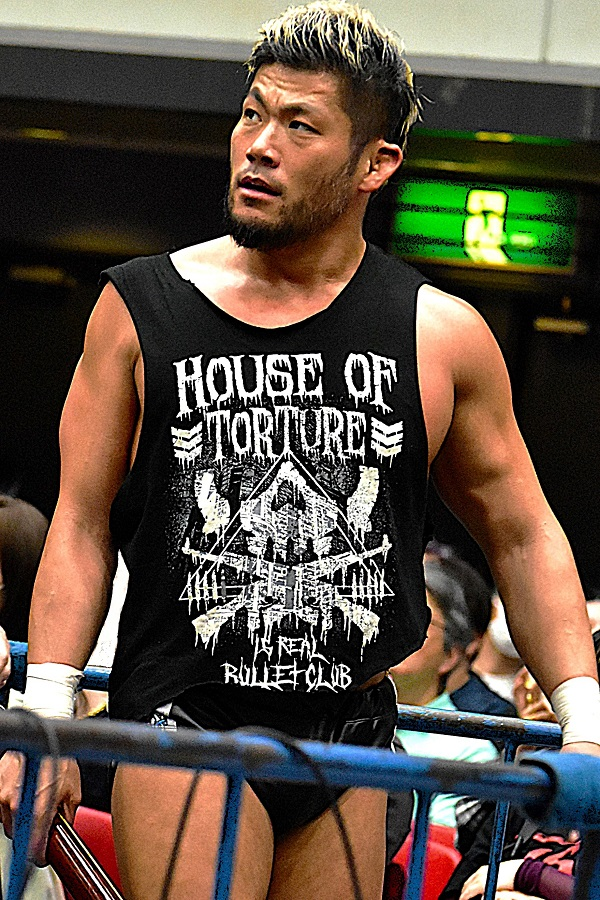
Sanada

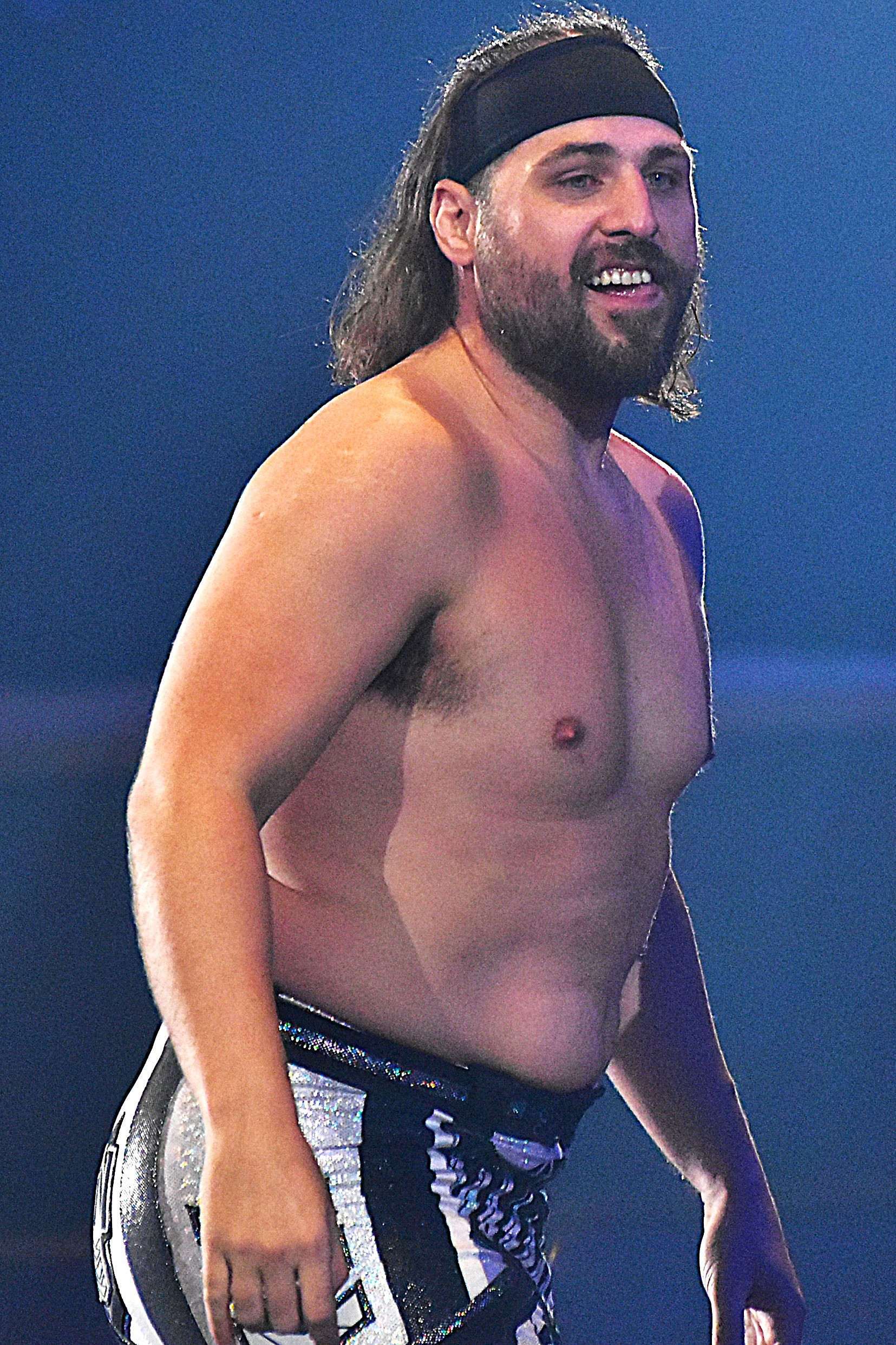
Chase Owens

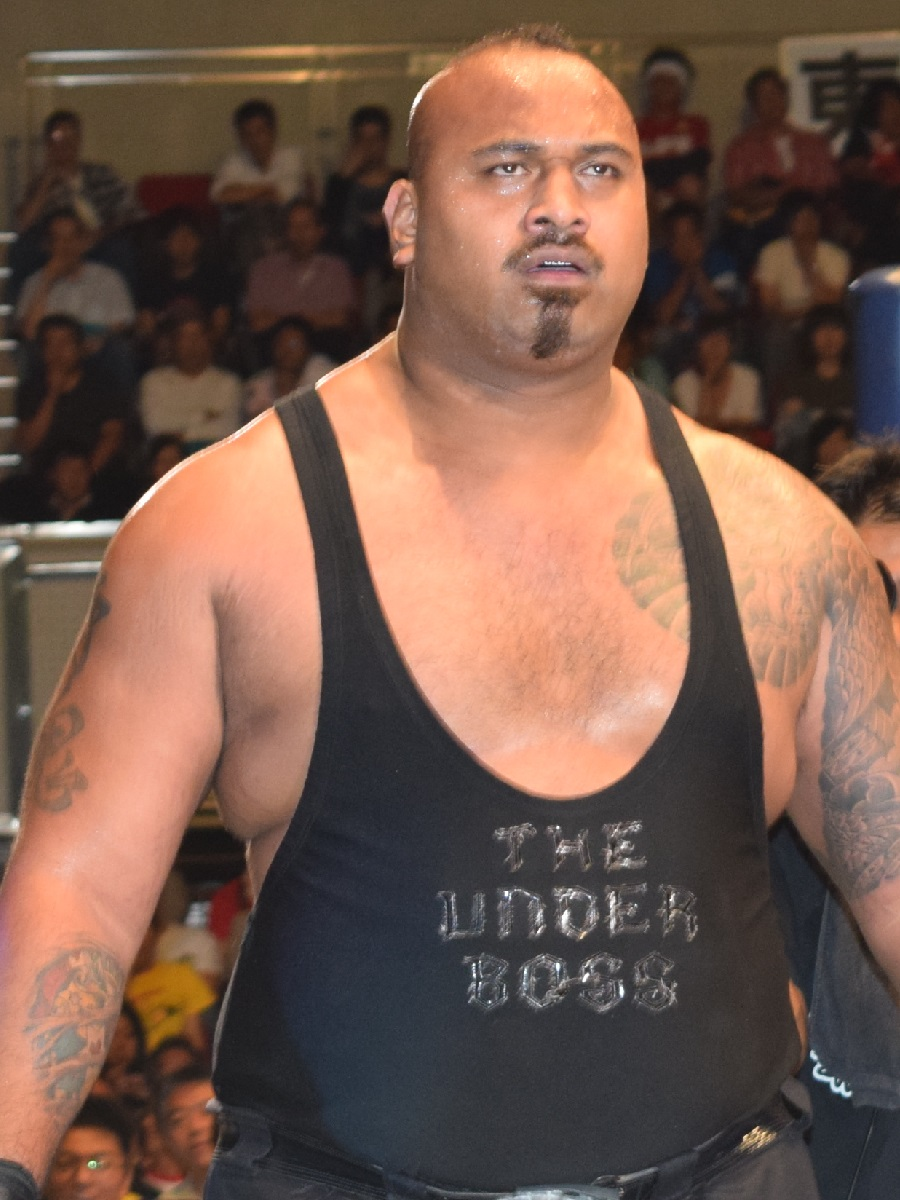
Don Fale

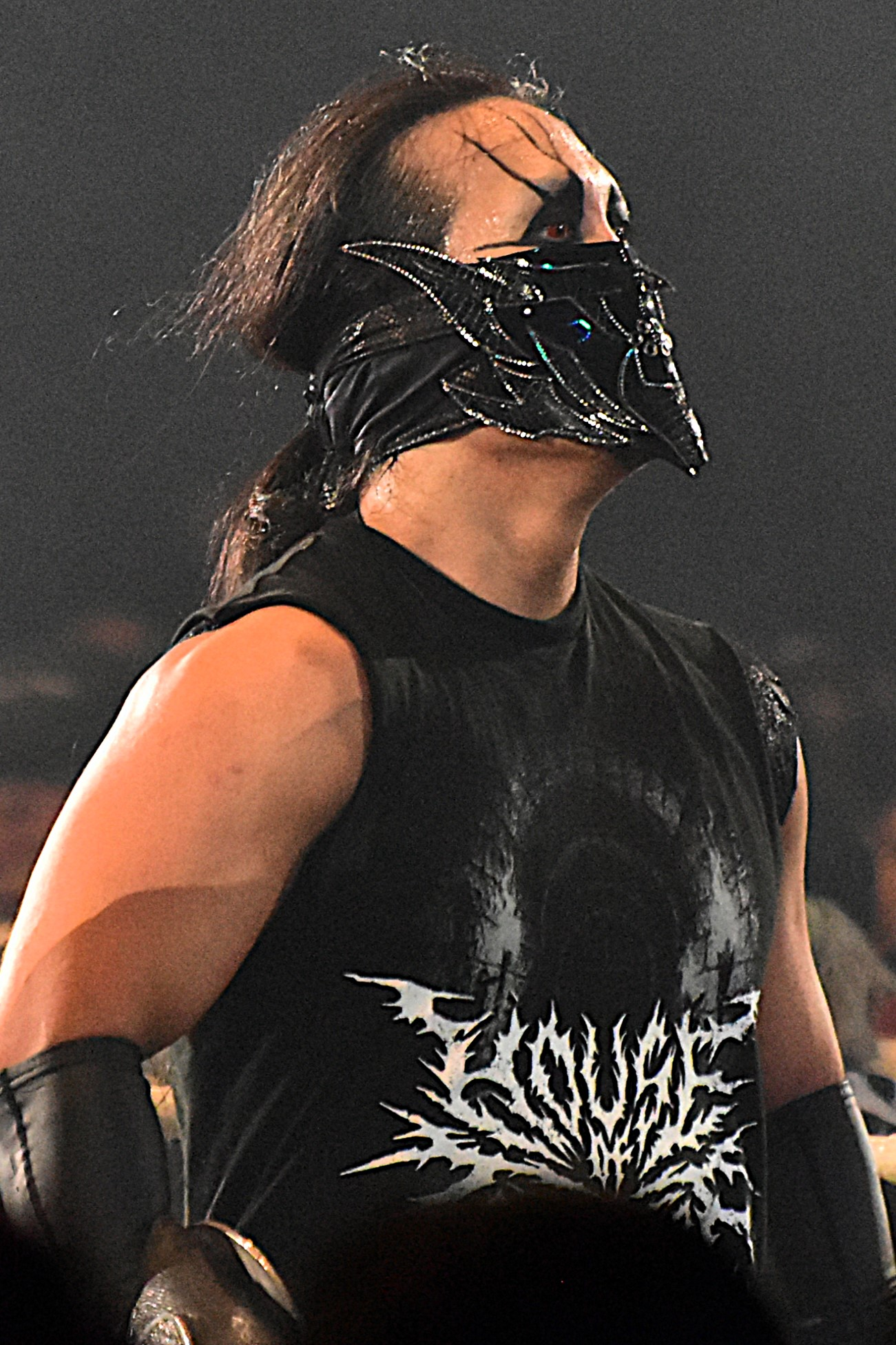
Douki

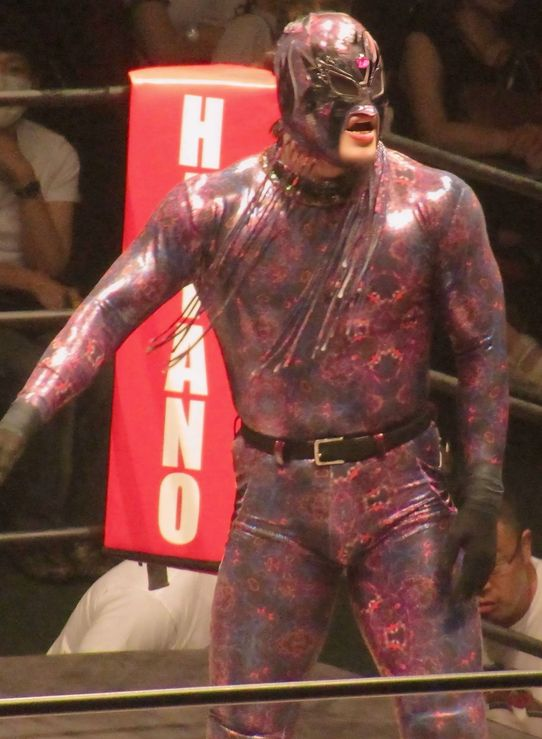
Shun Skywalker

*	Founding member
I-II	Leader(s)
M	Manager

=== Current ===
Member		Joined
Dick Togo	*M	September 4, 2021
Sho	*	September 4, 2021
Yujiro Takahashi	*	September 4, 2021
Yoshinobu Kanemaru		September 24, 2023
Ren Narita	II	December 6, 2023
Sanada		April 5, 2025
Chase Owens		June 15, 2025
Don Fale		June 15, 2025
Douki		June 15, 2025
Shun Skywalker		August 15, 2026

=== Former ===
Member		Joined	Left
Jack Perry		March 6, 2024	November 5, 2024
Evil	*I	September 4, 2021	January 25, 2026

== Championships and accomplishments ==
- New Japan Pro Wrestling
  - IWGP Junior Heavyweight Championship (2 times) – Sho (1), Douki (1)
  - IWGP Junior Heavyweight Tag Team Championship (1 time) – Sho and Douki
  - NEVER Openweight Championship (4 times) – Evil (3) and Narita (1)
  - NEVER Openweight 6-Man Tag Team Championship (3 times) – Evil, Sho and Yujiro (2) and Narita, Sho and Yujiro (1)
  - NJPW TAMASHII Openweight Championship (1 time, inaugural, current) – Fale
  - NJPW World Television Championship (2 times) – Narita (1), Skywalker (1)
  - Super Junior Tag League (2025) – Sho and Douki
- Pro Wrestling Illustrated
    - Ranked Evil No. 29 of the top 500 singles wrestlers in the PWI 500 of 2021
    - Ranked Sho No. 103 of the top 500 singles wrestlers in the PWI 500 of 2024
    - Ranked Ren Narita No. 83 of the top 500 singles wrestlers in the PWI 500 of 2026
    - Ranked Sanada No. 179 of the top 500 singles wrestlers in the PWI 500 of 2025
    - Ranked Shun Skywalker No. 114 of the top 500 singles wrestlers in the PWI 500 of 2026.
