= Wrestle Kingdom 12 =

2018 New Japan Pro-Wrestling event

- Promotional poster for the event, featuring various NJPW wrestlers
- Promotion: New Japan Pro-Wrestling
- Date: January 4, 2018
- City: Tokyo, Japan
- Venue: Tokyo Dome
- Attendance: 43,000 (total); 34,995 (paid)
- Tagline: Pro-Wrestling Together! 1.4!! (Japanese: みんなでプロレス! イッテンヨン!!, Hepburn: Minnade Puroresu! Ittenyon!!)

Event chronology
← Previous; Dai Puroresu Matsuri; Lion's Gate Project 10	Next → New Year Dash!!

Wrestle Kingdom chronology
← Previous; 11	Next → 13

Wrestle Kingdom 12 in Tokyo Dome was a professional wrestling event promoted by New Japan Pro-Wrestling (NJPW). The event took place on January 4, 2018, at the Tokyo Dome in Tokyo, Japan. It was the 27th January 4 Tokyo Dome Show.

The show was headlined by Kazuchika Okada defending the IWGP Heavyweight Championship against the winner of the 2017 G1 Climax, Tetsuya Naito, in a rematch from Wrestle Kingdom 8 in 2014. The second match of the show's "double main event" saw Kenny Omega defend the IWGP United States Heavyweight Championship against Chris Jericho in a no disqualification match, the latter of whom returned to the NJPW ring after nearly 20 years away from the promotion.

Six other title matches also took place on the show with Hiroshi Tanahashi defending the IWGP Intercontinental Championship against Jay White, Marty Scurll defending the IWGP Junior Heavyweight Championship in a four-way match against Hiromu Takahashi, Kushida and Will Ospreay, Minoru Suzuki defending the NEVER Openweight Championship against Hirooki Goto in a hair vs. hair match, Killer Elite Squad (Davey Boy Smith Jr. and Lance Archer) defending the IWGP Tag Team Championship against the 2017 World Tag League winners Los Ingobernables de Japón (Evil and Sanada), Bullet Club (Bad Luck Fale, Tama Tonga and Tanga Loa) defending the NEVER Openweight 6-Man Tag Team Championship in a five-team gauntlet match and Roppongi 3K (Sho and Yoh) defending the IWGP Junior Heavyweight Tag Team Championship against The Young Bucks (Matt Jackson and Nick Jackson). All in all, the event featured ten matches (including one on the pre-show).

== Production ==
Other on-screen personnel
Role:	Name:
Commentators	Don Callis (English-language announcer)
Commentators	Kevin Kelly (English-language announcer)
Ring announcers	Makoto Abe
Referees	Kenta Sato
Referees	Marty Asami
Referees	Red Shoes Unno
Referees	Tiger Hattori

=== Background ===
The January 4 Tokyo Dome Show is NJPW's biggest annual event and has been called "the largest wrestling show in the world outside of the United States" and the "Japanese equivalent to the Super Bowl". Wrestle Kingdom 12 was officially announced on August 13, 2017, during the final of the 2017 G1 Climax. Jurina Matsui of SKE48 was appointed the special ambassador of the event. The event would air live through NJPW's internet streaming site, NJPW World, with English commentary provided by Kevin Kelly and Don Callis.

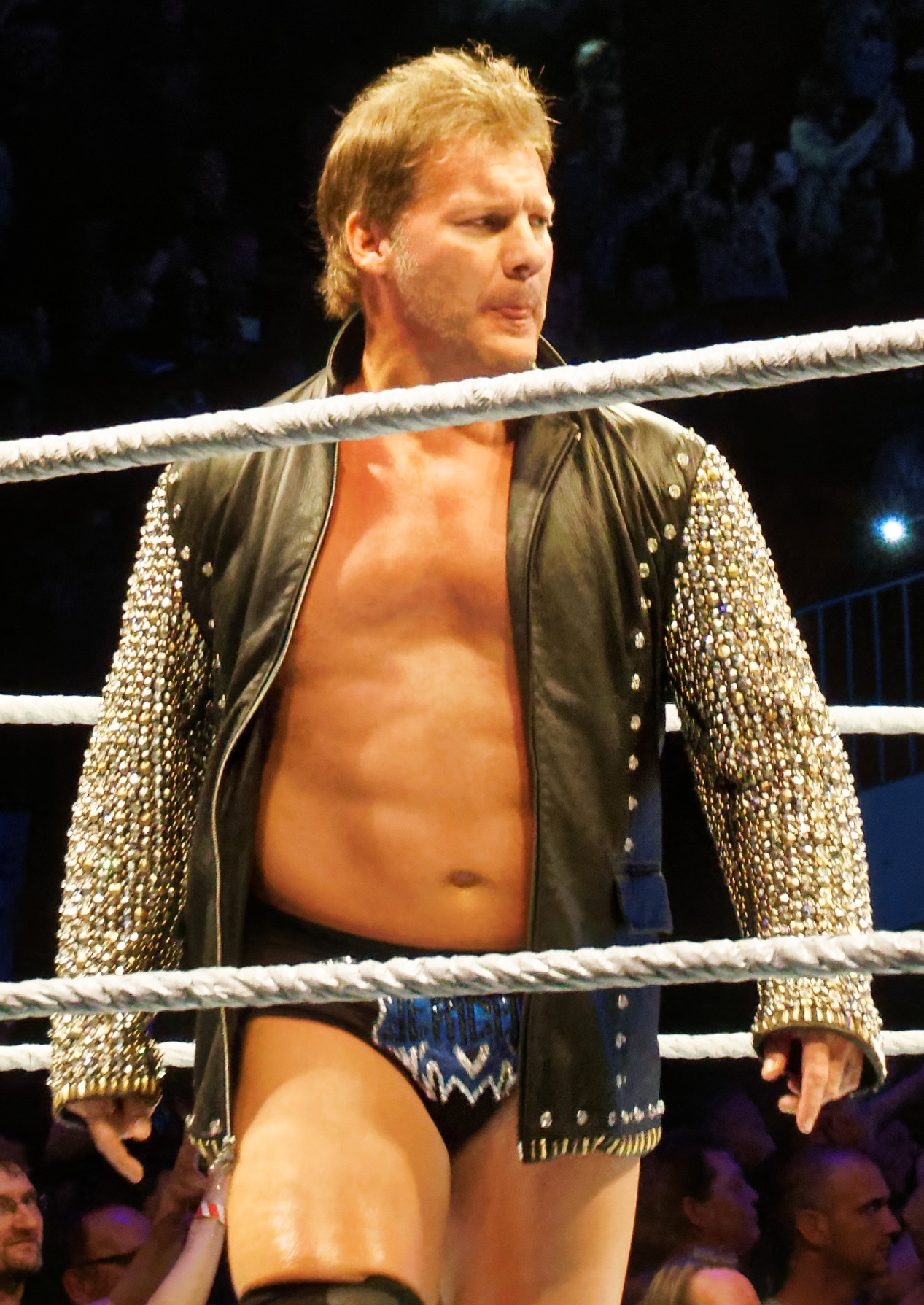
Chris Jericho wrestled his first NJPW match in nearly two decades at the event

Takaaki Kidani announced that NJPW looked to get 30,000 fans in attendance for the show. Tickets for the event went on sale on October 25, 2017. NJPW was said to have been shocked at the large number of tickets sold outside of Japan with the situation being described as "like nothing before for any Japanese pro wrestling show in history". On November 27, NJPW announced that ticket sales were up 80% from the previous year with 20,000 tickets having already been sold. On December 25, the promotion announced that 30,000 tickets had been sold. Three days later, NJPW announced it would be making more seats available on the day on the show.

The event would feature a special appearance by Chris Jericho, wrestling his first NJPW match in nearly two decades against Kenny Omega. Billed as "Alpha vs. Omega", the match marked Jericho's first match outside of WWE since 1999. Jericho previously worked for NJPW in 1997, originally as the masked Super Liger, before returning to the Chris Jericho name. Jericho's last NJPW match before Wrestle Kingdom 12 took place on September 23, 1998, teaming with the late Black Tiger II in a loss to Shinjiro Otani and Tatsuhito Takaiwa for the IWGP Junior Heavyweight Tag Team Championship. He most recently worked for WWE in July 2017, but was now a free agent. NJPW color commentator Don Callis, a mutual friend of Jericho and Omega, came up with the idea for the match between his fellow Winnipeggers. He pitched the idea to Jericho, expecting him to laugh it off, but Jericho instead was interested in the match, seeing parallels between it and the August 2017 fight between Conor McGregor and Floyd Mayweather Jr. Jericho finally realized that NJPW was serious about putting the match together, when four of the promotion's officials, including booker Gedo, flew to New York City for the first meeting between the two parties. After several weeks of negotiating, a deal for the match was reached, at which point Jericho, despite not being under a WWE contract, talked to the company's chairman Vince McMahon, who was said to have been "fine" with the idea of Jericho working a NJPW event. At that time, Jericho's appearance at Wrestle Kingdom 12 was scheduled to be a one-time deal. Jericho called the match a throwback to the 1980s, where wrestlers would travel overseas for matches and stated that the match would push promotions to think more and be more creative.

Behind the scenes, Jericho became part of a group of people that started pushing for the show to air on American pay-per-view (PPV) for the first time since Wrestle Kingdom 9 in 2015. Some in NJPW felt that airing the show through NJPW World would be enough, hoping that the Jericho signing would increase subscriber numbers. While NJPW was now considered more popular than in 2015, when Wrestle Kingdom 9 did 14,000 buys on American PPV, it was noted that the 2018 show would take place early Thursday morning in the United States as opposed to a weekend like it did in 2015, which was seen as a major negative in terms of getting buys from the country. In late November, it was reported that NJPW had turned down FITE TV's offer for PPV rights outside of Japan and would not be allowing the event to air on American PPV, wanting their streaming service to be the only way to see the event live. On December 3, it was announced that the top matches from the show would air on AXS TV on January 6, 2018, as part of an 11-hour block of NJPW programming with additional matches airing between January 12 and February 9. Five matches, including the top three matches, will air on TV Asahi as part of a special episode of World Pro Wrestling on the night of January 4.

=== Storylines ===
Wrestle Kingdom 12 featured ten professional wrestling matches that involved different wrestlers from pre-existing scripted feuds and storylines. Wrestlers portrayed villains, heroes, or less distinguishable characters in the scripted events that built tension and culminated in a wrestling match or series of matches.

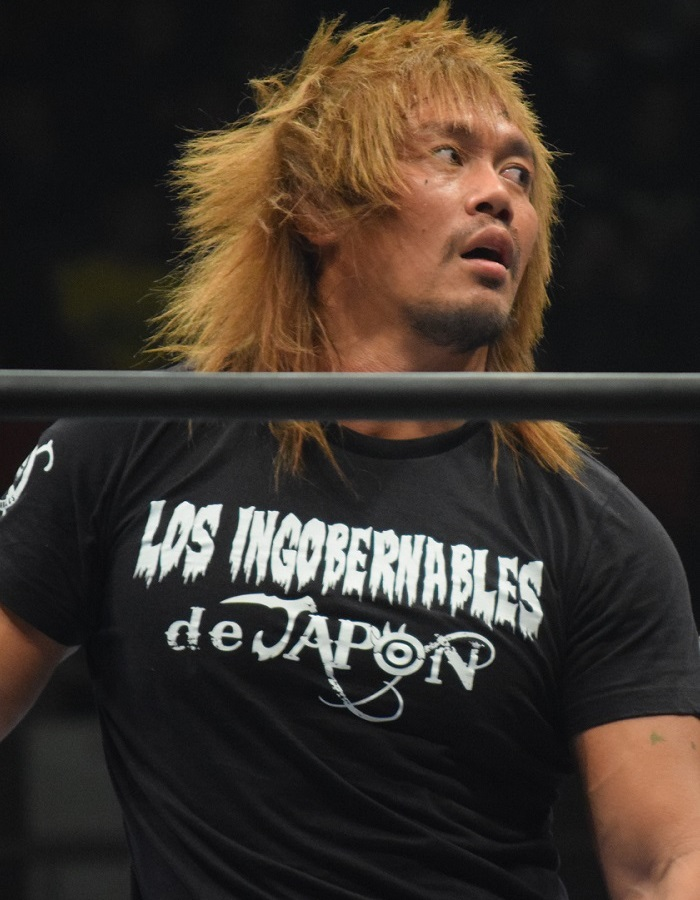
Tetsuya Naito, the winner of the 2017 G1 Climax and the number one contender to the IWGP Heavyweight Championship

Wrestle Kingdom 12 was main evented by Kazuchika Okada defending the IWGP Heavyweight Championship against Tetsuya Naito. The storyline behind the match dates back to 2013, when Naito won the G1 Climax tournament to earn a shot at Okada and the IWGP Heavyweight Championship at Wrestle Kingdom 8 on January 4, 2014. However, at that time, Naito, despite being a clean cut babyface, was disliked by NJPW fans, which led to the company changing their course of action, announcing a fan vote to determine whether the match between Okada and Naito or an IWGP Intercontinental Championship match between Shinsuke Nakamura and Hiroshi Tanahashi would main event Wrestle Kingdom 8. Nakamura and Tanahashi won the vote, resulting in Okada and Naito losing their main event spot. Okada went on to defeat Naito in the match to retain the title. In the summer of 2015, Naito traveled to Mexico to work for the Consejo Mundial de Lucha Libre (CMLL) promotion, where he joined the villainous Los Ingobernables stable. Upon his return to NJPW, Naito, using the NJPW fans' rejection of him as a catalyst, completely reinvented his character, eventually leading to him forming the Los Ingobernables de Japón stable. Despite now being a villain, fans eventually started getting behind Naito with Los Ingobernables de Japón merchandise becoming NJPW's top seller. When Naito defeated Okada at Invasion Attack 2016 on April 10 to win the IWGP Heavyweight Championship for the first time, he had the crowd solidly behind him. Naito eventually went on to lose the title back to Okada on June 19, 2016, at Dominion 6.19 in Osaka-jo Hall.

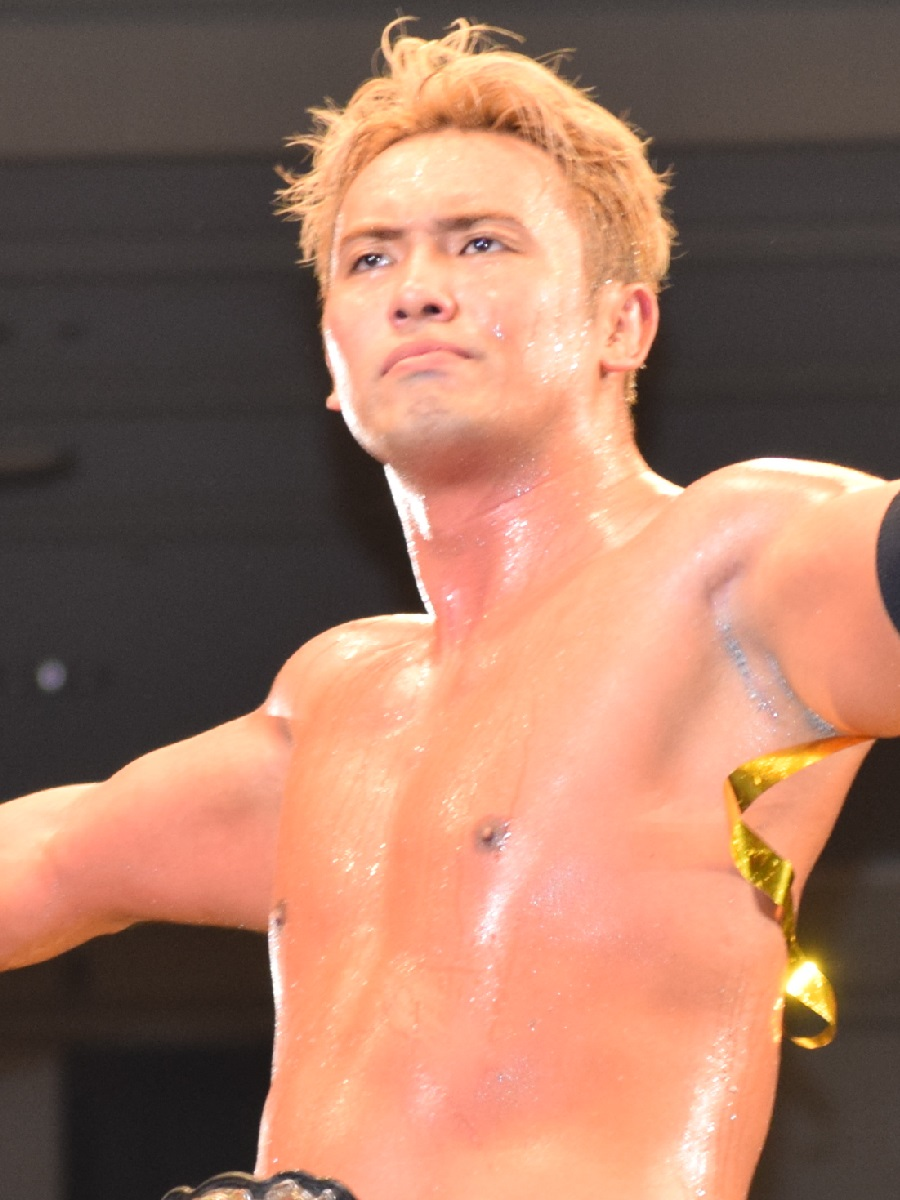
Kazuchika Okada, the defending and longest-reigning IWGP Heavyweight Champion

On August 13, 2017, Naito defeated Kenny Omega in the final to win the 2017 G1 Climax. With Naito now being fully embraced by NJPW fans, this was seen as the conclusion of a four-year arc that started at the 2013 G1 Climax, where he was rejected by the same fans. Following the win, Naito gained possession of the Tokyo Dome IWGP Heavyweight Championship challenge rights certificate, which granted him a shot at the IWGP Heavyweight Championship at Wrestle Kingdom 12. On October 9 at King of Pro-Wrestling, Naito successfully defended the certificate against Tomohiro Ishii, while Kazuchika Okada successfully defended the IWGP Heavyweight Championship against Evil, setting up the main event of Wrestle Kingdom 12 between champion Okada and challenger Naito. The match was officially announced in a press conference the following day. As part of the build-up to the title match, Okada introduced a new submission hold, a cobra clutch, as a counter to Naito's finishing maneuver, Destino. However, on December 18, in their final confrontation before Wrestle Kingdom 12, Naito managed to counter himself out of the hold and hit Okada with the Destino, leaving him laid out. Okada has held the IWGP Heavyweight Championship ever since defeating Naito at Dominion 6.19 in Osaka-jo Hall, having successfully defended the title eight times, and enters the match as the longest-reigning champion in the title's history. This match would mark Okada's fourth consecutive and overall fifth Wrestle Kingdom main event, while Naito had never main evented the show before.

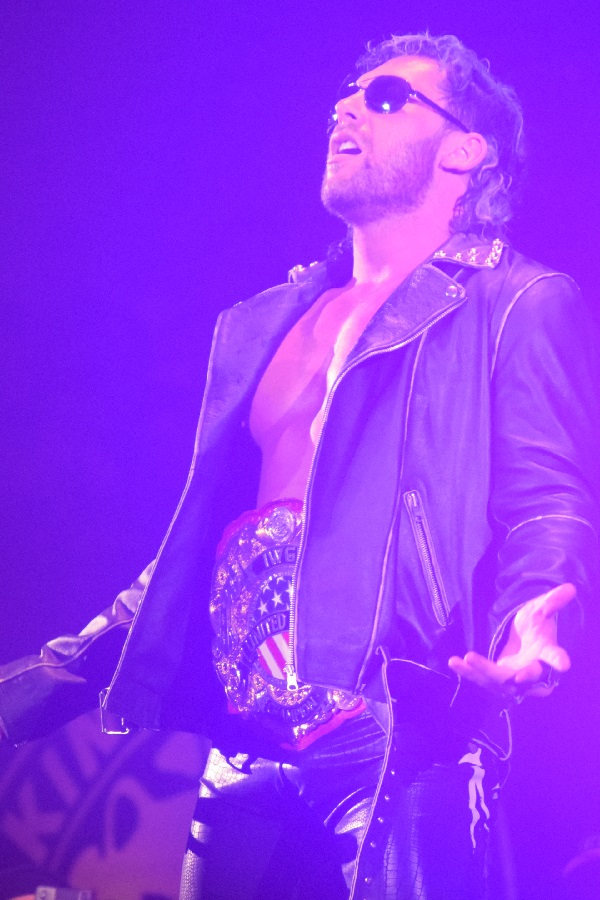
Kenny Omega, who defended the IWGP United States Heavyweight Championship as part of the show's double main event

On November 5, 2017, at Power Struggle, Chris Jericho made a surprise return to NJPW, appearing in a video, where he challenged Kenny Omega to a match at Wrestle Kingdom 12 in Tokyo Dome. The challenge was quickly accepted by Omega, who had been engaged in a "Twitter feud" with his fellow Winnipegger over the past weeks. The match, contested for Omega's IWGP United States Heavyweight Championship, was officially announced the following day. Due to the high-profile status of the match, Omega began petitioning for Wrestle Kingdom 12 to have a "double main event" much like the Wrestle Kingdom shows had had in 2013, 2014 and 2015. Omega stated that he agreed that Okada and Naito should have the final match of the show, but felt that he and Jericho should have the second to last match, claiming that just four months after the creation of the IWGP United States Heavyweight Championship, he had already made it the number two title in NJPW over the IWGP Intercontinental Championship. Jericho made his in person return at the December 11 show, attacking and bloodying Omega following his match, while also laying out a referee, a young lion and Don Callis. At a press conference the following day, Omega stated that with the attack Jericho had turned their upcoming "gentleman's contest" into a fight, before attacking his Wrestle Kingdom 12 opponent. During the same conference, NJPW officially announced that Wrestle Kingdom 12 would feature a double main event with the IWGP Heavyweight and United States Heavyweight Championship matches. Naito stated that he was disappointed with the decision, adding that NJPW would never become the number one promotion in the world as long as they were humoring WWE. On December 18, NJPW announced that, as a result of both Omega and Jericho demanding it, the match had been turned into a no disqualification match.

In the IWGP Intercontinental Championship match, Hiroshi Tanahashi defended the title against Jay White. White joined NJPW in January 2015 and worked for the promotion as a young lion until June 2016, when he left for an indefinite learning excursion to the United States, where he worked for Ring of Honor (ROH). During the 2017 G1 Climax, NJPW started airing vignettes for an individual dubbed "Switchblade", who was announced as making his debut on November 5 at Power Struggle. Following the main event of the show, where Tanahashi successfully defended the IWGP Intercontinental Championship against Kota Ibushi, Switchblade was revealed as the returning Jay White, who confronted Tanahashi and challenged him to a title match at Wrestle Kingdom 12, before laying him out with the Shellshock. The following day, NJPW officially announced the match between Tanahashi and White for Wrestle Kingdom 12. In December, Tanahashi was sidelined with a knee injury when an MRI discovered arthritis and water in his knee. However, as he had a long history of working hurt and not missing major shows, it was noted that the injury would have to be "unbearably bad" for him to miss Wrestle Kingdom 12. Tanahashi appeared at NJPW's December 18 show, assuring that he would be defending his title at Wrestle Kingdom 12, before being attacked by White, who targeted his injured knee.

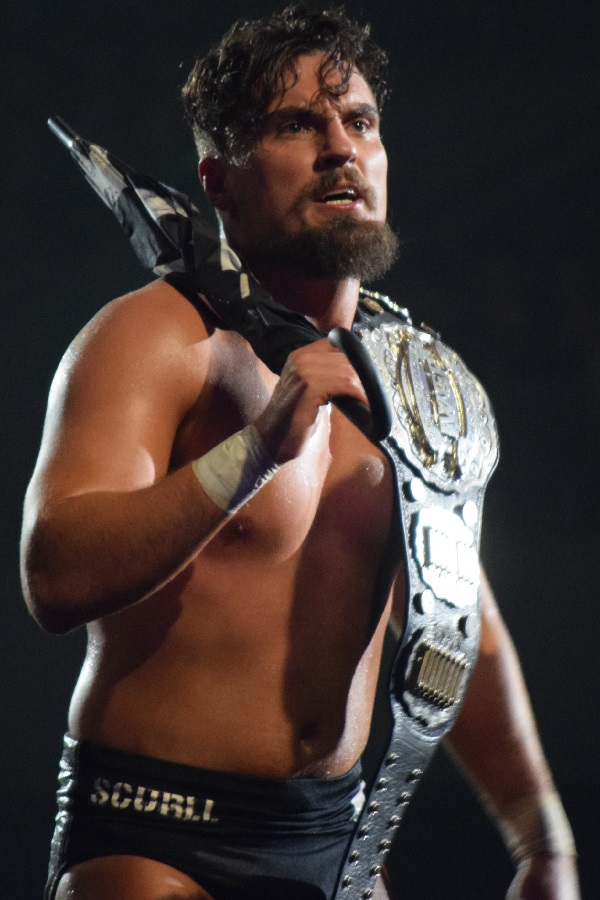
Marty Scurll, who defended the IWGP Junior Heavyweight Championship in the first four-way match in the title's history

Wrestle Kingdom 12 also featured the first-ever four-way match for the IWGP Junior Heavyweight Championship, where Marty Scurll defended the title against Hiromu Takahashi, Kushida and Will Ospreay. The match was set up through a series of title challenges in the second half of 2017. After Kushida had successfully defended the title against El Desperado on September 16 at Destruction in Hiroshima, he was confronted by Takahashi, who was ready to challenge him to a title match. However, before Takahashi could complete his challenge, he was knocked out by Ospreay, who took the title match for himself and went on to defeat Kushida to become the new champion on October 9 at King of Pro-Wrestling. Following the match, Takahashi again came out to issue a title challenge, but was again interrupted, this time by Scurll, who snapped his fingers and made his own challenge to Ospreay. This led to a match on November 5 at Power Struggle, where Scurll defeated Ospreay to become the new champion. Following the match, Scurll and Ospreay continued arguing, while Kushida came out to challenge Scurll to a title match at Wrestle Kingdom 12. Finally, Takahashi also came out, this time wearing a helmet and gloves to prevent the other challengers from knocking him out or breaking his fingers, and made his own title challenge. Scurll then declared that he would take on all three challengers. The IWGP Junior Heavyweight Championship has previously been defended in a three-way match, with Prince Devitt defending the title against Kota Ibushi and Low Ki at Wrestle Kingdom 7 in Tokyo Dome, but this marked the first four-way for the title.

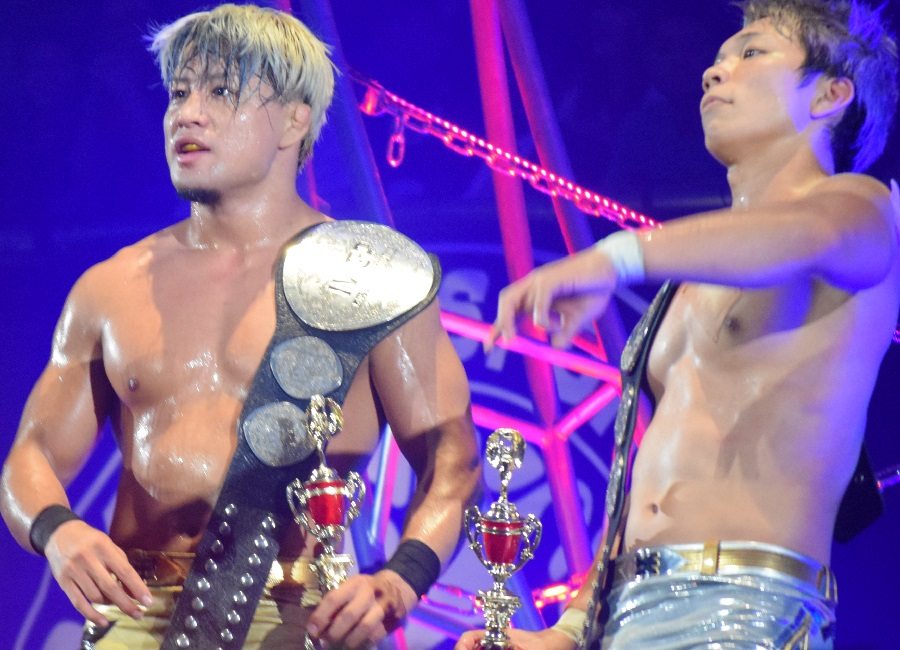
Roppongi 3K after winning both the IWGP Junior Heavyweight Tag Team Championship and the 2017 Super Jr. Tag Tournament en route to Wrestle Kingdom 12

On October 9 at King of Pro-Wrestling, Sho Tanaka and Yohei Komatsu made their return to NJPW from their overseas learning excursion, when they were revealed as Rocky Romero's new mystery team Roppongi 3K. Working under the names "Sho" and "Yoh", the two defeated Ricochet and Ryusuke Taguchi to become the new IWGP Junior Heavyweight Tag Team Champions in their first match back. The following month at Power Struggle, Roppongi 3K also won the 2017 Super Jr. Tag Tournament by defeating Taguchi and A. C. H. in the final, becoming the first team to win the annual tournament as the reigning champions. Following the win, the two were challenged by The Young Bucks, which was accepted by Romero, who had significant history with the two involving the IWGP Junior Heavyweight Tag Team Championship and his previous team Roppongi Vice. Ever since their NJPW debut in October 2013, The Young Bucks had become synonymous with the IWGP Junior Heavyweight Tag Team Championship with would mark the first match between the teams since Sho and Yoh's "rebirth" as Roppongi 3K.

Also at Power Struggle, Cody confronted Kota Ibushi after he had been defeated by Tanahashi in the main event, offering to defend the ROH World Championship against him at Wrestle Kingdom 12. Initially announced the following day as a potential title match, the match instead became a non-title "special singles match", when Cody lost the ROH World Championship to Dalton Castle at ROH's Final Battle on December 15. Prior to the Chris Jericho announcement, Ibushi had been seen as a possible opponent for Kenny Omega at Wrestle Kingdom 12, with the two former tag team partners having teased a match against each other since Ibushi's June 2017 return to NJPW. In the build-up to the match, Cody, Omega's Bullet Club stablemate, compared Ibushi to Brutus Beefcake and Omega to Hulk Hogan, claiming that Ibushi was nothing more than a sidekick in their team.

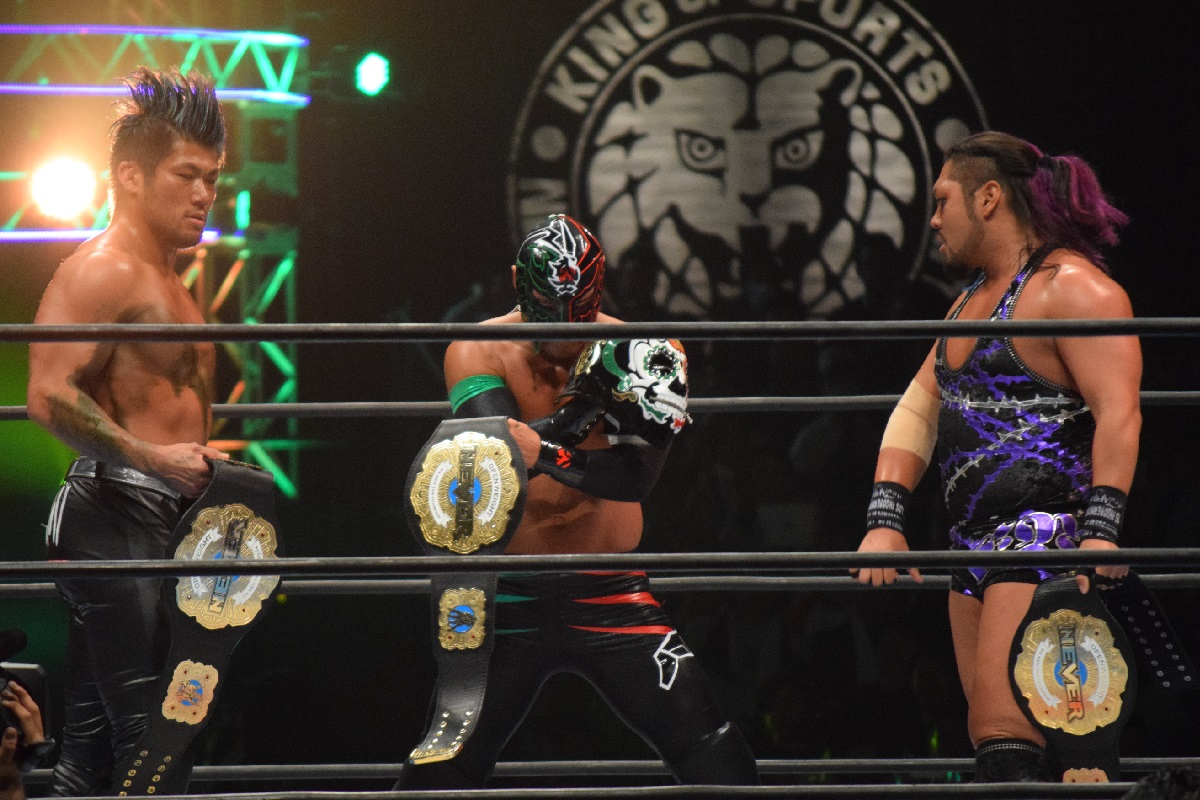
Sanada (left) and Evil (right) (pictured with Bushi), the winners of the 2017 World Tag League

On December 11, Los Ingobernables de Japón members Evil and Sanada defeated Guerrillas of Destiny (Tama Tonga and Tanga Loa) to win the 2017 World Tag League. Traditionally, the winners of the tournament have earned a shot at the IWGP Tag Team Championship at the January 4 Tokyo Dome Show and following the win, Evil and Sanada called out reigning champions, Killer Elite Squad (Davey Boy Smith Jr. and Lance Archer), and challenged them to a title match, which they accepted. The match was officially announced the following day. Evil and Sanada entered the World Tag League as two thirds of the reigning NEVER Openweight 6-Man Tag Team Champions with stablemate Bushi, but decided to put that title on hold in order to challenge for the tag team title at the biggest event of the year. The three were looking to defend the title the day after Wrestle Kingdom 12, but NJPW instead announced that they would defend it against the Guerrillas of Destiny and Bad Luck Fale on December 17. Bushi insinuated that NJPW wanted to have a six-man tag team title match in the Tokyo Dome and were looking to get the title off him, Evil and Sanada. On December 17, Guerrillas of Destiny and Fale defeated the Los Ingobernables de Japón trio to become the new NEVER Openweight 6-Man Tag Team Champions. Two days later, it was announced that the new champions would defend the title in a five-team gauntlet match at Wrestle Kingdom 12.

At Power Struggle, after Minoru Suzuki had defeated Toru Yano to retain the NEVER Openweight Championship, he was challenged by Hirooki Goto. Suzuki, however, turned down the challenge, stating that he was done with Goto, having first defeated him to win the title in April and again to retain the title in June. On November 18, Goto pinned Suzuki in their opening match in the 2017 World Tag League and afterwards made another challenge for the NEVER Openweight Championship. On December 11, when Suzuki again turned down Goto's challenge, stating he had nothing to offer in return for another title match, Goto offered to put his hair on the line in the match. On December 17, Suzuki tried to cut Goto's hair with clippers, but was thwarted, which led to him shaving young lion Tetsuhiro Yagi instead. After being pinned by Goto again the following day, Suzuki accepted his challenge for a title match, stating that the match would be one-on-one with no seconds at ringside and with the loser getting his head shaved. The match was officially announced the following day.

== Results ==
No.	Results	Stipulations	Times
1^{P}	Masahito Kakihara won by last eliminating Cheeseburger	New Japan Rumble	32:06
2	The Young Bucks (Matt Jackson and Nick Jackson) defeated Roppongi 3K (Sho and Yoh) (c) (with Rocky Romero) by submission	Tag team match for the IWGP Junior Heavyweight Tag Team Championship	18:49
3	Chaos (Beretta, Tomohiro Ishii and Toru Yano) defeated Bullet Club (Bad Luck Fale, Tama Tonga and Tanga Loa) (c), Michael Elgin and War Machine (Hanson and Raymond Rowe), Suzuki-gun (Taichi, Takashi Iizuka and Zack Sabre Jr.) (with El Desperado, Taka Michinoku and Yoshinobu Kanemaru) and Taguchi Japan (Juice Robinson, Ryusuke Taguchi and Togi Makabe)	Gauntlet match for the NEVER Openweight 6-Man Tag Team Championship	17:03
4	Kota Ibushi defeated Cody (with Brandi Rhodes)	Singles match	15:08
5	Los Ingobernables de Japón (Evil and Sanada) defeated Killer Elite Squad (Davey Boy Smith Jr. and Lance Archer) (c)	Tag team match for the IWGP Tag Team Championship	14:14
6	Hirooki Goto defeated Minoru Suzuki (c)	Hair vs. hair and no seconds deathmatch for the NEVER Openweight Championship	18:04
7	Will Ospreay defeated Marty Scurll (c), Hiromu Takahashi, and Kushida	Four-way match for the IWGP Junior Heavyweight Championship	21:18
8	Hiroshi Tanahashi (c) defeated Jay White	Singles match for the IWGP Intercontinental Championship	19:43
9	Kenny Omega (c) defeated Chris Jericho	No Disqualification match for the IWGP United States Heavyweight Championship	34:36
10	Kazuchika Okada (c) (with Gedo) defeated Tetsuya Naito	Singles match for the IWGP Heavyweight Championship	34:26
(c) / – the champion(s) heading into the match; P / – the match was broadcast on the pre-show

- ^{a} Also in the New Japan Rumble match were Bushi, Chase Owens, David Finlay, Delirious, El Desperado, Gino Gambino, Hiroyoshi Tenzan, Jyushin Thunder Liger, Katsuya Kitamura, Leo Tonga, Manabu Nakanishi, Satoshi Kojima, Taka Michinoku, Tiger Mask, Toa Henare, Yoshi-Hashi, Yoshinobu Kanemaru, Yuji Nagata and Yujiro Takahashi

=== Gauntlet match ===
Elimination	Wrestler	Team	Eliminated by	Elimination move	Time	Ref.
1	Raymond Rowe	Michael Elgin and War Machine	Zack Sabre Jr.	Referee stoppage	06:05	
2	Taichi	Suzuki-gun	Toru Yano	Pinned with a Schoolboy	06:46	
3	Ryusuke Taguchi	Taguchi Japan	Toru Yano	Pinned with a Schoolboy	10:15	
4	Tama Tonga	Bullet Club	Beretta	Pinned after a Dudebuster	17:03	
Winners:	Chaos (Beretta, Tomohiro Ishii and Toru Yano)					

== See also ==
- 2018 in professional wrestling
- Professional wrestling at the Tokyo Dome
