= Wrestling Dontaku 2017 =

2017 New Japan Pro-Wrestling event

- Promotional poster for the event, featuring caricatures of several NJPW wrestlers
- Promotion: New Japan Pro-Wrestling
- Date: May 3, 2017
- City: Fukuoka, Japan
- Venue: Fukuoka Kokusai Center
- Attendance: 6,126

Event chronology
← Previous; Sakura Genesis; Road to Wrestling Dontaku; Lion's Gate Project 4	Next → New Japan Road; War of the Worlds; Lion's Gate Project 5

Wrestling Dontaku chronology
← Previous; 2016	Next → 2018

Wrestling Dontaku 2017 was a professional wrestling event promoted by New Japan Pro-Wrestling (NJPW). The event took place on May 3, 2017, in Fukuoka, Fukuoka at Fukuoka Kokusai Center and featured ten matches, three of which were contested for championships. The show was headlined by Kazuchika Okada defending the IWGP Heavyweight Championship against Bad Luck Fale. This was the fourteenth event under the Wrestling Dontaku name.

== Production ==
=== Storylines ===
Wrestling Dontaku 2017 featured ten professional wrestling matches that involved different wrestlers from pre-existing scripted feuds and storylines. Wrestlers portrayed villains, heroes, or less distinguishable characters in the scripted events that built tension and culminated in a wrestling match or series of matches.

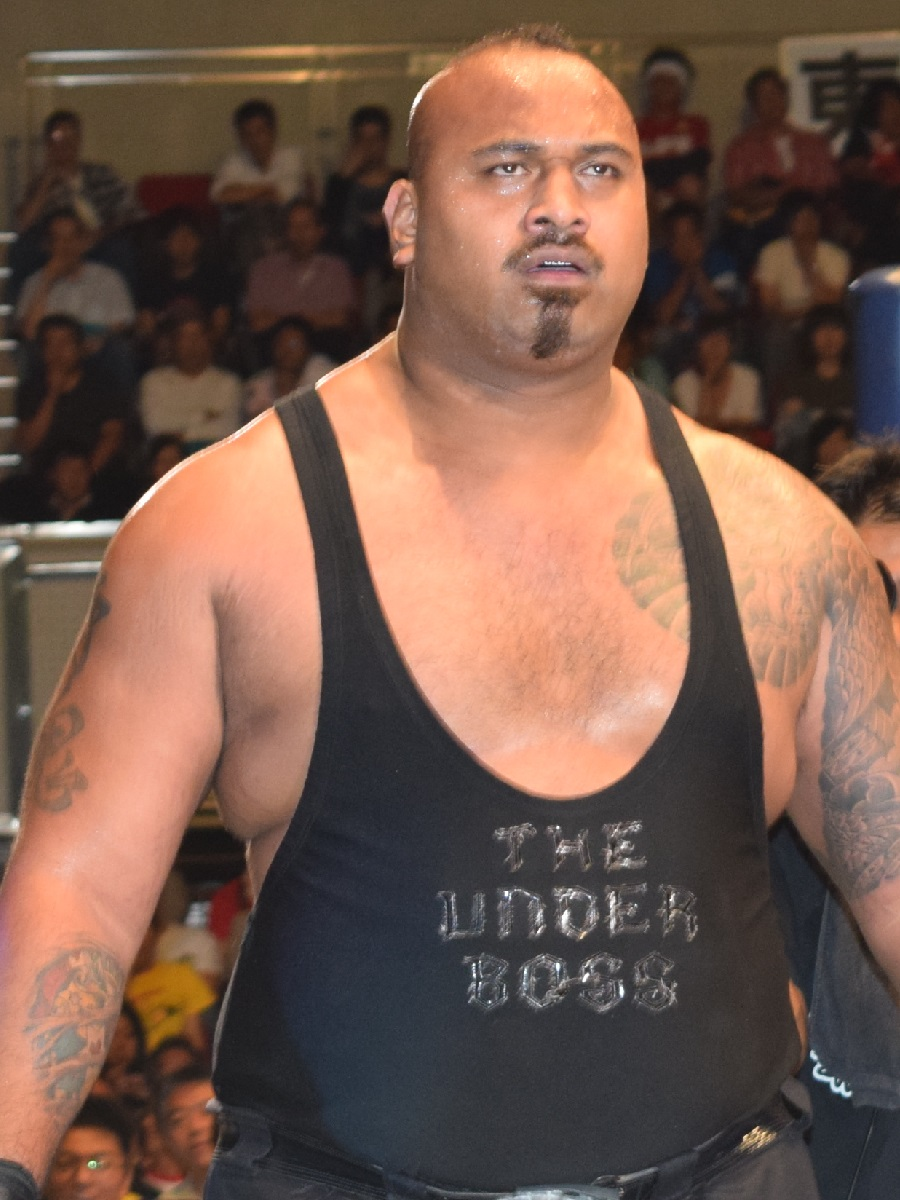
Bad Luck Fale challenged for the IWGP Heavyweight Championship in the main event of Wrestling Dontaku 2017

Wrestling Dontaku 2017 was headlined by Kazuchika Okada making his fifth defense of the IWGP Heavyweight Championship against Bad Luck Fale. This match was set up on April 9 at Sakura Genesis 2017, where Fale attacked Okada after he had made his fourth successful title defense against the 2017 New Japan Cup winner Katsuyori Shibata. Fale, who had lost to Shibata in the final of the New Japan Cup, had defeated Okada on August 8, 2016, during the 2016 G1 Climax, but instead of a title shot, was granted a non-title match against Okada on September 22 at Destruction in Hiroshima, where he was defeated by the reigning IWGP Heavyweight Champion. The match at Wrestling Dontaku 2017 marked Fale's first shot at the IWGP Heavyweight Championship.

In the semi-main event, Kenny Omega took on Tomohiro Ishii. Prior to challenging Kazuchika Okada for the IWGP Heavyweight Championship at Wrestle Kingdom 11 in Tokyo Dome on January 4, 2017, Omega stated that he wanted to defend the title against Ishii. After failing to capture the title, Omega and Ishii faced off in the first round of the 2017 New Japan Cup, where Ishii was victorious, derailing Omega's quest for another shot at the IWGP Heavyweight Championship. On April 9, Omega pinned Ishii in a tag team match and afterwards requested a singles rematch with him, which was made official the following day.

Two more title matches were scheduled to take place at Wrestling Dontaku 2017. In the NEVER Openweight 6-Man Tag Team Championship match, Taguchi Japan (Hiroshi Tanahashi, Ricochet and Ryusuke Taguchi) would defend against previous champions Los Ingobernables de Japón (Bushi, Evil and Sanada) in a rematch from April 4. Meanwhile, the IWGP Tag Team Championship would be defended in a three-way match with new champions War Machine (Hanson and Raymond Rowe) facing Guerrillas of Destiny (Tama Tonga and Tanga Loa) and Tencozy (Hiroyoshi Tenzan and Satoshi Kojima). After defeating Tencozy for the title on April 9, War Machine accepted a rematch challenge from the previous champions as well as another challenge made backstage by Guerrillas of Destiny, leading to NJPW announcing the three-way match the following day.

Other matches at the event included the returning Cody taking on David Finlay and the Chaos and Suzuki-gun stables facing off in a ten-man tag team match.

== Results ==
No.	Results	Stipulations	Times
1^{P}	Hirai Kawato and Yoshitatsu defeated Katsuya Kitamura and Tomoyuki Oka	Tag team match	07:54
2	Chaos (Will Ospreay and Yoshi-Hashi) defeated Bullet Club (Chase Owens and Yujiro Takahashi)	Tag team match	06:53
3	Tiger Mask, Tiger Mask W and Togi Makabe defeated Jyushin Thunder Liger, Manabu Nakanishi and Yuji Nagata	Six-man tag team match	07:06
4	Chaos (Beretta, Hirooki Goto, Jado, Rocky Romero and Toru Yano) defeated Suzuki-gun (El Desperado, Minoru Suzuki, Taichi, Taka Michinoku and Yoshinobu Kanemaru)	Ten-man tag team match	12:20
5	Cody defeated David Finlay	Singles match	07:31
6	Los Ingobernables de Japón (Hiromu Takahashi and Tetsuya Naito) defeated Taguchi Japan (Juice Robinson and Kushida)	Tag team match	09:00
7	War Machine (Hanson and Raymond Rowe) (c) defeated Guerrillas of Destiny (Tama Tonga and Tanga Loa) and Tencozy (Hiroyoshi Tenzan and Satoshi Kojima)	Three-way tag team match for the IWGP Tag Team Championship	11:43
8	Los Ingobernables de Japón (Bushi, Evil and Sanada) defeated Taguchi Japan (Hiroshi Tanahashi, Ricochet and Ryusuke Taguchi) (c)	Six-man tag team match for the NEVER Openweight 6-Man Tag Team Championship	15:48
9	Kenny Omega defeated Tomohiro Ishii	Singles match	23:55
10	Kazuchika Okada (c) (with Gedo) defeated Bad Luck Fale (with Chase Owens and Yujiro Takahashi)	Singles match for the IWGP Heavyweight Championship	21:47
(c) / – the champion(s) heading into the match; P / – the match was broadcast on the pre-show
