= Wrestling Dontaku 2018 =

2018 New Japan Pro-Wrestling event

- Promotion: New Japan Pro-Wrestling
- Date: May 3-4, 2018
- City: Fukuoka, Japan
- Venue: Fukuoka Kokusai Center
- Attendance: 10,373 (total); Night 1: 4,066; Night 2: 6,307

Event chronology
← Previous; Road to Wrestling Dontaku; Wrestling Hinokuni	Next → New Japan Road; War of the Worlds; Lion's Gate Project 12

Wrestling Dontaku chronology
← Previous; 2017	Next → 2019

Wrestling Dontaku 2018 was a professional wrestling event promoted by New Japan Pro-Wrestling (NJPW). The event took place on May 3 and 4, 2018, in Fukuoka, at the Fukuoka Kokusai Center. The first night of the event featured nine matches, with a championship at stake in one of these, while the second night featured two championship matches out of nine overall. The main event of the first night was Kenny Omega against Hangman Page, and the second night's main event was Kazuchika Okada defending the IWGP Heavyweight Championship against Hiroshi Tanahashi. This was the fifteenth event under the Wrestling Dontaku name.

== Storylines ==
Other on-screen personnel
Role:	Name:
Commentators	Don Callis (English-language announcer)
Commentators	Kevin Kelly (English-language announcer)
Ring announcers	Makoto Abe
Referees	Kenta Sato
Referees	Marty Asami
Referees	Red Shoes Unno
Referees	Tiger Hattori

Each night of Wrestling Dontaku 2018 featured nine professional wrestling matches that involved different wrestlers from pre-existing scripted feuds and storylines. Wrestlers portrayed villains, heroes, or less distinguishable characters in the scripted events that built tension and culminated in a wrestling match or series of matches.

== Results ==
=== Night 1 ===
No.	Results	Stipulations	Times
1	Bullet Club (Chase Owens and Yujiro Takahashi) defeated Yota Tsuji and Shota Umino	Tag team match	05:32
2	Taguchi Japan (Ryusuke Taguchi and Jyushin Thunder Liger), and Tiger Mask defeated Ren Narita, Tomoyuki Oka and Yuji Nagata	Six-man tag team match	07:12
3	Chaos (Sho, Yoh and Rocky Romero) defeated Suzuki-gun (Takashi Iizuka, Davey Boy Smith Jr. and Lance Archer)	Six-man tag team match	02:04
4	Chaos (Hirooki Goto, Jay White, Tomohiro Ishii, Toru Yano and Yoshi-Hashi) defeated Taguchi Japan (Toa Henare, Michael Elgin, Togi Makabe, David Finlay and Juice Robinson)	Ten-man tag team match	10:25
5	Super Villains (Marty Scurll, Matt Jackson & Nick Jackson) defeated Bullet Club (Bad Luck Fale, Tama Tonga and Tanga Loa) (c)	Six-man tag team match for the NEVER Openweight 6-Man Tag Team Championship	12:05
6	Los Ingobernables de Japón (Hiromu Takahashi, Bushi, Evil, Sanada and Tetsuya Naito) defeated Suzuki-gun (Minoru Suzuki, Zack Sabre Jr., Taichi, Yoshinobu Kanemaru and El Desperado)	Ten-man tag team match	13:36
7	Chaos (Will Ospreay and Kazuchika Okada) defeated Taguchi Japan (Hiroshi Tanahashi and Kushida)	Tag team match	16:15
8	Cody defeated Kota Ibushi	Singles match	23:36
9	Kenny Omega defeated Hangman Page	Singles match	18:23
(c) / – the champion(s) heading into the match

=== Night 2 ===
No.	Results	Stipulations	Times
1	Taguchi Japan (Ryusuke Taguchi and Jyushin Thunder Liger), and Tiger Mask defeated Ren Narita, Shota Umino and Yuya Uemura	Six-man tag team match	06:34
2	Bullet Club (Chase Owens and Yujiro Takahashi) defeated Tomoyuki Oka and Yuji Nagata	Tag team match	06:11
3	Chaos (Sho, Yoh and Rocky Romero) defeated Suzuki-gun (Takashi Iizuka, Taichi and Taka Michinoku)	Six-man tag team match	06:00
4	Chaos (Toru Yano and Tomohiro Ishii) defeated Toa Henare and Togi Makabe	Tag team match	07:12
5	Chaos (Jay White, Yoshi-Hashi & Hirooki Goto) defeated Taguchi Japan (Michael Elgin, David Finlay and Juice Robinson)	Six-man tag team match	11:04
6	Los Ingobernables de Japón (Hiromu Takahashi, Bushi, Evil, Sanada and Tetsuya Naito) defeated Suzuki-gun (Minoru Suzuki, Davey Boy Smith Jr., Lance Archer, Yoshinobu Kanemaru and El Desperado)	Ten-man tag team match	08:31
7	Bullet Club (Bad Luck Fale, Tama Tonga, Tanga Loa) and Golden☆Lovers (Kenny Omega & Kota Ibushi) defeated Bullet Club (Cody, Hangman Page, Marty Scurll, Matt Jackson & Nick Jackson)	Ten-man tag team match	08:47
8	Will Ospreay (c) defeated Kushida	Singles match for the IWGP Junior Heavyweight Championship	23:46
9	Kazuchika Okada (c) defeated Hiroshi Tanahashi	Singles match for the IWGP Heavyweight Championship	34:36
(c) / – the champion(s) heading into the match
