= Lion's Gate Project =

Japanese professional wrestling promotion

Logo of the first Lion's Gate Project show

Lion's Gate is the developmental branch of professional wrestling promotion New Japan Pro-Wrestling (NJPW), which holds events under the banner of Lion's Gate Project. The branch was officially announced on July 18, 2015, and held its first show on February 25, 2016. In addition to NJPW wrestlers, the Lion's Gate Project shows also feature wrestlers from other promotions, resulting in unique cards.

The events are held at Tokyo's Shinjuku Face. The first three shows featured heavy participation from wrestlers from the Pro Wrestling Noah promotion. Wrestlers from promotions such as All Japan Pro Wrestling (AJPW), Big Japan Pro Wrestling (BJW) and Kaientai Dojo (K-Dojo) have also taken part in the project. NJPW rookies Takumi Honjo, Shota Umino, Tetsuhiro Yagi and Ren Narita have made their official debuts at Lion's Gate Project shows, while Katsuya Kitamura and Tomoyuki Oka wrestled their unofficial debuts as part of the project.

== History ==
On July 18, 2015, NJPW held a press conference on various items relating to the future of the promotion. One of these was the establishment of a developmental branch, where NJPW could discover and develop both Japanese and foreign wrestlers. It was also intended as a place where trials could be held for outside wrestlers and where injured wrestlers could go to get back in shape. The plan was for the branch to eventually start running its own small shows. The project quickly drew comparisons to WWE's NXT developmental branch. NJPW had earlier attempted a developmental branch with a project named NEVER, which held shows between 2010 and 2012.

Recently, NJPW had been described as "lax in cultivation of new talent", however, on January 3, 2016, the promotion introduced four new wrestlers with Hirai Kawato and Teruaki Kanemitsu wrestling their debut matches, while Katsuya Kitamura and Tomoyuki Oka were announced as the two newest recruits to the NJPW dojo. Dave Meltzer called the recruitment of the two former top amateur wrestlers "[p]robably the biggest move in a couple of years when it comes to new talent". The same day, NJPW announced that their developmental branch Lion's Gate would be holding its first show on February 25, 2016, in Tokyo's Shinjuku Face.

== Events ==
=== Lion's Gate Project 1 ===
Lion's Gate Project 1
- Promotion: New Japan Pro-Wrestling
- Brand: Lion's Gate
- Date: February 25, 2016
- City: Tokyo, Japan
- Venue: Shinjuku Face
- Attendance: 467

Event chronology
| ← Previous; Honor Rising: Japan | Next → New Japan Cup |

Lion's Gate Project chronology
| ← Previous — | Next → Lion's Gate Project 2 |

New Japan Pro-Wrestling events chronology
| ← Previous; Honor Rising: Japan 2016 | Next → Invasion Attack 2016 |

The first Lion's Gate Project event was held on February 25, 2016, in Tokyo at Shinjuku Face. The event featured ten matches, including one dark match, an "exhibition match" featuring the unofficial debuts of Katsuya Kitamura and Tomoyuki Oka, working under amateur wrestling rules. The other nine matches featured NJPW wrestlers taking on Pro Wrestling Noah wrestlers. The second match saw the debut of Animal Hamaguchi trainee Takumi Honjo, who was defeated by Noah's Maybach Taniguchi. The show was main evented by NJPW veteran Yuji Nagata defeating Noah's Mitsuhiro Kitamiya.

| No. | Results | Stipulations | Times |
|---|---|---|---|
| 1^{D} | Katsuya Kitamura vs. Tomoyuki Oka ended in a time limit draw | Singles match | 03:00 |
| 2 | Maybach Taniguchi defeated Takumi Honjo | Singles match | 04:24 |
| 3 | Hitoshi Kumano defeated Hirai Kawato | Singles match | 04:32 |
| 4 | Ryusuke Taguchi defeated Kaito Kiyomiya | Singles match | 06:20 |
| 5 | Taiji Ishimori defeated David Finlay | Singles match | 08:08 |
| 6 | Yoshinari Ogawa defeated Jay White | Singles match | 08:50 |
| 7 | Manabu Nakanishi defeated Quiet Storm | Singles match | 07:47 |
| 8 | Tencozy (Hiroyoshi Tenzan and Satoshi Kojima) defeated Captain Noah and Genba Hirayanagi | Tag team match | 11:08 |
| 9 | Katsuhiko Nakajima defeated Juice Robinson | Singles match | 12:20 |
| 10 | Yuji Nagata defeated Mitsuhiro Kitamiya | Singles match | 14:28 |
D / – this was a dark match

=== Lion's Gate Project 2 ===
Lion's Gate Project 2
- Promotion: New Japan Pro-Wrestling
- Brand: Lion's Gate
- Date: May 19, 2016
- City: Tokyo, Japan
- Venue: Shinjuku Face
- Attendance: 467

Event chronology
| ← Previous; Global Wars | Next → Best of the Super Jr. XXIII |

Lion's Gate Project chronology
| ← Previous; Lion's Gate Project 1 | Next → Lion's Gate Project 3 |

New Japan Pro-Wrestling events chronology
| ← Previous; Global Wars | Next → Dominion 6.19 in Osaka-jo Hall |

The second Lion's Gate Project event was held on May 19, 2016, in Tokyo at Shinjuku Face. Much like the first Lion's Gate Project show, the event featured several wrestlers from Pro Wrestling Noah as well as Ayato Yoshida from Kaientai Dojo (K-Dojo). All in all, the event featured eight matches.

| No. | Results | Stipulations | Times |
|---|---|---|---|
| 1 | Kaito Kiyomiya defeated Hirai Kawato | Singles match | 05:51 |
| 2 | Shiro Tomoyose vs. Teruaki Kanemitsu ended in a time limit draw | Singles match | 10:00 |
| 3 | Hitoshi Kumano defeated Ayato Yoshida | Singles match | 06:10 |
| 4 | Yoshinari Ogawa defeated David Finlay | Singles match | 08:30 |
| 5 | Muhammad Yone and Ryusuke Taguchi defeated Captain Noah and Genba Hirayanagi | Tag team match | 13:26 |
| 6 | Naomichi Marufuji defeated Jay White | Singles match | 12:41 |
| 7 | Go Shiozaki defeated Juice Robinson | Singles match | 14:53 |
| 8 | Hiroyoshi Tenzan, Manabu Nakanishi, Satoshi Kojima and Yuji Nagata defeated Katsuhiko Nakajima, Masa Kitamiya, Maybach Taniguchi and Quiet Storm | Eight-man tag team match | 12:55 |

=== Lion's Gate Project 3 ===
Lion's Gate Project 3
- Promotion: New Japan Pro-Wrestling
- Brand: Lion's Gate
- Date: September 1, 2016
- City: Tokyo, Japan
- Venue: Shinjuku Face
- Attendance: 467

Event chronology
| ← Previous; Super J-Cup | Next → Destruction in Tokyo |

Lion's Gate Project chronology
| ← Previous; Lion's Gate Project 2 | Next → Lion's Gate Project 4 |

New Japan Pro-Wrestling events chronology
| ← Previous; Dominion 6.19 in Osaka-jo Hall | Next → Destruction (2016) |

The third Lion's Gate Project event was held on September 1, 2016, in Tokyo at Shinjuku Face. The event featured nine matches, including one dark match, and again featured heavy participation from Pro Wrestling Noah. One of the matches saw the NJPW debut of the promotion's newest international trainee, Henare, who was defeated by Noah's Quiet Storm. In addition to the NJPW and Noah wrestlers, the event featured Ayato Yoshida and Go Asakawa from Kaientai Dojo (K-Dojo). The dark match featured another exhibition match between NJPW trainees Katsuya Kitamura and Tomoyuki Oka, this time worked under professional wrestling rules.

| No. | Results | Stipulations | Times |
|---|---|---|---|
| 1^{D} | Katsuya Kitamura vs. Tomoyuki Oka ended in a time limit draw | Singles match | 05:00 |
| 2 | Quiet Storm defeated Henare | Singles match | 06:02 |
| 3 | Hajime Ohara defeated Hirai Kawato | Singles match | 08:08 |
| 4 | Kenoh defeated Teruaki Kanemitsu | Singles match | 06:38 |
| 5 | Tomoaki Honma defeated Shiro Tomoyose | Singles match | 07:13 |
| 6 | David Finlay defeated Go Asakawa | Singles match | 06:30 |
| 7 | Juice Robinson defeated Ayato Yoshida | Singles match | 07:42 |
| 8 | Ryusuke Taguchi defeated Hitoshi Kumano | Singles match | 08:41 |
| 9 | Hiroyoshi Tenzan, Katsuyori Shibata, Manabu Nakanishi, Satoshi Kojima and Yuji Nagata defeated Go Shiozaki, Kaito Kiyomiya, Katsuhiko Nakajima, Masa Kitamiya and Maybach Taniguchi | Ten-man tag team match | 17:46 |
D / – this was a dark match

=== Lion's Gate Project 4 ===
Lion's Gate Project 4
- Promotion: New Japan Pro-Wrestling
- Date: April 13, 2017
- City: Tokyo, Japan
- Venue: Shinjuku Face
- Attendance: 467

Event chronology
| ← Previous; Sakura Genesis | Next → Road to Wrestling Dontaku; Wrestling Dontaku 2017 |

Lion's Gate Project chronology
| ← Previous; Lion's Gate Project 3 | Next → Lion's Gate Project 5 |

The fourth Lion's Gate Project event was held on April 13, 2017, in Tokyo at Shinjuku Face. The event featured six matches, including the debut match of Shota Umino, son of NJPW referee Red Shoes Unno. Unno refereed the match, where his son was defeated by Taka Michinoku. Following the dissolution of the partnership between NJPW and Pro Wrestling Noah at the end of 2016, this was the first Lion's Gate Project show not to feature any wrestlers from Noah, instead Ayato Yoshida and Dinosaur Takuma from Kaientai Dojo (K-Dojo), Koji Iwamoto and Yuma Aoyagi from All Japan Pro Wrestling (AJPW) and Toru Sugiura from Pro Wrestling Freedoms took part in the event as outsiders.

| No. | Results | Stipulations | Times |
|---|---|---|---|
| 1 | Taka Michinoku defeated Shota Umino | Singles match | 06:11 |
| 2 | El Desperado defeated Hirai Kawato | Singles match | 09:21 |
| 3 | Gedo and Jado defeated Koji Iwamoto and Yuma Aoyagi | Tag team match | 13:30 |
| 4 | Yoshi-Hashi defeated Toru Sugiura | Singles match | 09:44 |
| 5 | Tencozy (Hiroyoshi Tenzan and Satoshi Kojima) defeated Ayato Yoshida and Dinosaur Takuma | Tag team match | 11:26 |
| 6 | Tomoyuki Oka and Yuji Nagata defeated Katsuya Kitamura and Manabu Nakanishi | Tag team match | 14:18 |

=== Lion's Gate Project 5 ===
Lion's Gate Project 5
- Promotion: New Japan Pro-Wrestling
- Brand: Lion's Gate
- Date: May 9, 2017
- City: Tokyo, Japan
- Venue: Shinjuku Face
- Attendance: 444

Event chronology
| ← Previous; Wrestling Dontaku 2017; New Japan Road | Next → Best of the Super Jr. 24; War of the Worlds: Night 2 |

Lion's Gate Project chronology
| ← Previous; Lion's Gate Project 4 | Next → Lion's Gate Project 6 |

The fifth Lion's Gate Project event was held on May 9, 2017, in Tokyo at Shinjuku Face. The event featured six matches, including the debut of Tetsuhiro Yagi in the opening match. Outsiders taking part in the event included Ayato Yoshida and Dinosaur Takuma from Kaientai Dojo, Daisuke Kanehira from Pro Wrestling Heat Up and Toru Sugiura from Pro Wrestling Freedoms. In the main event of the show, the veteran duo of Manabu Nakanishi and Yuji Nagata were victorious over the rookie team of Katsuya Kitamura and Tomoyuki Oka in what marked Nagata's fifth straight main event win as part of Lion's Gate Project.

| No. | Results | Stipulations | Times |
|---|---|---|---|
| 1 | Hirai Kawato defeated Tetsuhiro Yagi | Singles match | 05:07 |
| 2 | El Desperado defeated Shota Umino | Singles match | 09:12 |
| 3 | Hiroyoshi Tenzan and Tiger Mask defeated Dinosaur Takuma and Toru Sugiura | Tag team match | 12:40 |
| 4 | Yoshi-Hashi defeated Daisuke Kanehira | Singles match | 12:23 |
| 5 | Satoshi Kojima defeated Ayato Yoshida | Singles match | 10:35 |
| 6 | Manabu Nakanishi and Yuji Nagata defeated Katsuya Kitamura and Tomoyuki Oka | Tag team match | 13:38 |

=== Lion's Gate Project 6 ===
Lion's Gate Project 6
- Promotion: New Japan Pro-Wrestling
- Brand: Lion's Gate
- Date: June 15, 2017
- City: Tokyo, Japan
- Venue: Shinjuku Face
- Attendance: 467

Event chronology
| ← Previous; Dominion 6.11 in Osaka-jo Hall | Next → Kizuna Road; G1 Special in USA |

Lion's Gate Project chronology
| ← Previous; Lion's Gate Project 5 | Next → Lion's Gate Project 7 |

The sixth Lion's Gate Project event was held on June 15, 2017, in Tokyo at Shinjuku Face. The event featured six matches and outside participation from Ayato Yoshida and Dinosaur Takuma from Kaientai Dojo (K-Dojo), Takuya Nomura from Big Japan Pro Wrestling (BJW) and Yuma Aoyagi from All Japan Pro Wrestling (AJPW).

| No. | Results | Stipulations | Times |
|---|---|---|---|
| 1 | El Desperado defeated Tetsuhiro Yagi | Singles match | 07:46 |
| 2 | Gedo and Jado defeated Hirai Kawato and Shota Umino | Tag team match | 10:45 |
| 3 | Hiroyoshi Tenzan and Tiger Mask defeated Dinosaur Takuma and Takuya Nomura | Tag team match | 11:15 |
| 4 | Manabu Nakanishi defeated Katsuya Kitamura | Singles match | 06:54 |
| 5 | Yoshi-Hashi defeated Yuma Aoyagi | Singles match | 11:33 |
| 6 | Ayato Yoshida and Satoshi Kojima defeated Tomoyuki Oka and Yuji Nagata | Tag team match | 17:32 |

=== Lion's Gate Project 7 ===
Lion's Gate Project 7
- Promotion: New Japan Pro-Wrestling
- Brand: Lion's Gate
- Date: July 4, 2017
- City: Tokyo, Japan
- Venue: Shinjuku Face
- Attendance: 444

Event chronology
| ← Previous; G1 Special in USA | Next → G1 Climax 27; War of the Worlds UK |

Lion's Gate Project chronology
| ← Previous; Lion's Gate Project 6 | Next → Lion's Gate Project 8 |

The seventh Lion's Gate Project event was held on July 4, 2017, in Tokyo at Shinjuku Face. The event featured seven matches, including the debut of Ren Narita in the opening match. Outsiders taking part in the event included Dinosaur Takuma and Go Asakawa from Kaientai Dojo (K-Dojo), Koji Iwamoto from All Japan Pro Wrestling (AJPW) and freelancer Dick Togo, who made his first NJPW appearance since 2011. Following the main event of the show, Yuji Nagata, seeing the recent influx of new talent into NJPW, proposed bringing back the Young Lion Cup for the first time in 12 years.

| No. | Results | Stipulations | Times |
|---|---|---|---|
| 1 | Ren Narita vs. Shota Umino ended in a time limit draw | Singles match | 10:00 |
| 2 | Taka Michinoku defeated Tetsuhiro Yagi | Singles match | 10:45 |
| 3 | Hiroyoshi Tenzan and Dinosaur Takuma defeated Katsuya Kitamura and Manabu Nakanishi | Tag team match | 09:25 |
| 4 | Dick Togo defeated Hirai Kawato | Singles match | 09:27 |
| 5 | Hiroyoshi Tenzan defeated Tomoyuki Oka | Singles match | 07:27 |
| 6 | Yoshi-Hashi defeated Koji Iwamoto | Singles match | 12:46 |
| 7 | Yuji Nagata defeated Go Asakawa | Singles match | 12:21 |

=== Lion's Gate Project 8 ===
Lion's Gate Project 8
- Promotion: New Japan Pro-Wrestling
- Brand: Lion's Gate
- Date: October 12, 2017
- City: Tokyo, Japan
- Venue: Shinjuku Face
- Attendance: 462

Event chronology
| ← Previous; King of Pro-Wrestling | Next → Global Wars |

Lion's Gate Project chronology
| ← Previous; Lion's Gate Project 7 | Next → Lion's Gate Project 9 |

The eighth Lion's Gate Project event was held on October 12, 2017, in Tokyo at Shinjuku Face. The event featured six matches, including the first three matches of the 2017 Young Lion Cup. NJPW announced on September 26 that it was bringing back the tournament for the first time in 12 years and dedicating it to the memory of Kotetsu Yamamoto, the former head of the NJPW dojo. The round-robin tournament would feature six NJPW rookies who debuted in 2016 and 2017. Non-tournament matches featured outside participation from Daisuke Kanehira from Pro Wrestling Heat Up, Go Asakawa and Kotaro Yoshino from Kaientai Dojo (K-Dojo) and Yuma Aoyagi from All Japan Pro Wrestling (AJPW).

| No. | Results | Stipulations | Times |
|---|---|---|---|
| 1 | Hirai Kawato defeated Ren Narita | Singles match in the 2017 Young Lion Cup | 07:14 |
| 2 | Katsuya Kitamura defeated Tetsuhiro Yagi | Singles match in the 2017 Young Lion Cup | 08:32 |
| 3 | Tomoyuki Oka defeated Shota Umino | Singles match in the 2017 Young Lion Cup | 10:50 |
| 4 | Manabu Nakanishi defeated Kotaro Yoshino | Singles match | 07:32 |
| 5 | Tencozy (Hiroyoshi Tenzan and Satoshi Kojima) defeated Go Asakawa and Yuma Aoyagi | Tag team match | 12:33 |
| 6 | Yuji Nagata defeated Daisuke Kanehira | Singles match | 12:12 |

=== Lion's Gate Project 9 ===
Lion's Gate Project 9
- Promotion: New Japan Pro-Wrestling
- Brand: Lion's Gate
- Date: November 16, 2017
- City: Tokyo, Japan
- Venue: Shinjuku Face
- Attendance: 467

Event chronology
| ← Previous; Power Struggle; Global Wars UK 2017 Night 2 | Next → World Tag League; Lion's Gate Project 10 |

Lion's Gate Project chronology
| ← Previous; Lion's Gate Project 8 | Next → Lion's Gate Project 10 |

The ninth Lion's Gate Project event was held on November 16, 2017, in Tokyo at Shinjuku Face. The event featured six matches, including the continuation of the 2017 Young Lion Cup. Non-tournament matches featured outside participation from Daisuke Kanehira from Pro Wrestling Heat Up, Go Asakawa and the tag team Dino Stones (Dinosaur Takuma and Kotaro Yoshino) from Kaientai Dojo (K-Dojo) and Yuma Aoyagi from All Japan Pro Wrestling (AJPW).

| No. | Results | Stipulations | Times |
|---|---|---|---|
| 1 | Tomoyuki Oka defeated Ren Narita | Singles match in the 2017 Young Lion Cup | 13:22 |
| 2 | Katsuya Kitamura defeated Shota Umino | Singles match in the 2017 Young Lion Cup | 10:04 |
| 3 | Hirai Kawato defeated Tetsuhiro Yagi | Singles match in the 2017 Young Lion Cup | 06:43 |
| 4 | Hiroyoshi Tenzan and Manabu Nakanishi defeated Dino Stones (Dinosaur Takuma and Kotaro Yoshino) | Tag team match | 11:55 |
| 5 | Ryusuke Taguchi defeated Go Asakawa | Singles match | 10:31 |
| 6 | Satoshi Kojima and Yuji Nagata defeated Daisuke Kanehira and Yuma Aoyagi | Tag team match | 15:14 |

=== Lion's Gate Project 10 ===
Lion's Gate Project 10
- Promotion: New Japan Pro-Wrestling
- Brand: Lion's Gate
- Date: December 21, 2017
- City: Tokyo, Japan
- Venue: Shinjuku Face
- Attendance: 467

Event chronology
| ← Previous; Road to Tokyo Dome | Next → Dai Puroresu Matsuri; Wrestle Kingdom 12 |

Lion's Gate Project chronology
| ← Previous; Lion's Gate Project 9 | Next → Lion's Gate Project 11 |

The tenth Lion's Gate Project event was held on December 21, 2017, in Tokyo at Shinjuku Face. The event featured six matches, including the conclusion of the 2017 Young Lion Cup with its three final matches. Katsuya Kitamura won the tournament with a clean record of five wins and zero losses. Non-tournament matches featured outside participation from Daisuke Kanehira from Pro Wrestling Heat Up, Dinosaur Takuma and Kotaro Yoshino from Kaientai Dojo (K-Dojo) and Yuma Aoyagi from All Japan Pro Wrestling (AJPW).

| No. | Results | Stipulations | Times |
|---|---|---|---|
| 1 | Ren Narita vs. Tetsuhiro Yagi ended in a draw | Singles match in the 2017 Young Lion Cup | 15:00 |
| 2 | Hirai Kawato defeated Shota Umino | Singles match in the 2017 Young Lion Cup | 08:27 |
| 3 | Katsuya Kitamura defeated Tomoyuki Oka | Singles match in the 2017 Young Lion Cup | 11:20 |
| 4 | Kotaro Yoshino and Manabu Nakanishi defeated Dinosaur Takuma and Hiroyoshi Tenzan | Tag team match | 12:42 |
| 5 | Satoshi Kojima defeated Daisuke Kanehira | Singles match | 11:01 |
| 6 | Yuji Nagata defeated Yuma Aoyagi | Singles match | 12:10 |

=== Lion's Gate Project 11 ===
Lion's Gate Project 11
- Promotion: New Japan Pro-Wrestling
- Brand: Lion's Gate
- Date: April 10, 2018
- City: Tokyo, Japan
- Venue: Shinjuku Face
- Attendance: 467

Event chronology
| ← Previous; Sakura Genesis | Next → Wrestling Hinokuni; Road to Wrestling Dontaku |

Lion's Gate Project chronology
| ← Previous; Lion's Gate Project 10 | Next → Lion's Gate Project 12 |

The eleventh Lion's Gate Project event was held on April 10, 2018, in Tokyo at Shinjuku Face. The event featured five matches. Two new rookies wrestled their debut match: Yuya Uemura and Yota Tsuji. Some matches featured outside participation: Manjimaru and Ken45°, from Michinoku Pro Wrestling, made their New Japan Pro-Wrestling debut and Ayato Yoshida and Go Asakawa made their return, from Kaientai Dojo (K-Dojo).

| No. | Results | Stipulations | Times |
|---|---|---|---|
| 1 | Ren Narita defeated Yuya Uemura | Singles match | 08:16 |
| 2 | Tomoyuki Oka defeated Yota Tsuji | Singles match | 07:17 |
| 3 | Hiro Saito and Gedo defeated Tiger Mask and Tetsuhiro Yagi | Tag team match | 14:59 |
| 4 | Hiroyoshi Tenzan and Manabu Nakanishi defeated Manjimaru and Ken45° | Tag team match | 13:35 |
| 5 | Ayato Yoshida and Go Asakawa defeated Yuji Nagata and Shota Umino | Tag team match | 12:03 |

=== Lion's Gate Project 12 ===
Lion's Gate Project 12
- Promotion: New Japan Pro-Wrestling
- Brand: Lion's Gate
- Date: May 15, 2018
- City: Tokyo, Japan
- Venue: Shinjuku Face
- Attendance: 419

Event chronology
| ← Previous; New Japan Road; War of the Worlds | Next → Best of the Super Jr. 25; Dominion 6.9 in Osaka-jo Hall |

Lion's Gate Project chronology
| ← Previous; Lion's Gate Project 11 | Next → Lion's Gate Project 13 |

The twelfth Lion's Gate Project event was held on May 15, 2018, in Tokyo at Shinjuku Face. Some matches featured outside participation: Daisuke Sekimoto from Big Japan Pro Wrestling and Ayato Yoshida from Kaientai Dojo (K-Dojo). The main event was a previously postponed one-on-one match between Yoshida and Yuji Nagata.

| No. | Results | Stipulations | Times |
|---|---|---|---|
| 1 | Yota Tsuji vs. Yuya Uemura ended in a draw | Singles match | 10:00 |
| 2 | Manabu Nakanishi defeated Tomoyuki Oka | Singles match | 09:04 |
| 3 | Hiroyoshi Tenzan and Hiro Saito defeated Ren Narita and Ryusuke Taguchi | Tag team match | 12:13 |
| 4 | Daisuke Sekimoto defeated Shota Umino | Singles match | 14:38 |
| 5 | Yuji Nagata defeated Ayato Yoshida | Singles match | 12:47 |

=== Lion's Gate Project 13 ===
Lion's Gate Project 13
- Promotion: New Japan Pro-Wrestling
- Brand: Lion's Gate
- Date: June 13, 2018
- City: Tokyo, Japan
- Venue: Shinjuku Face
- Attendance: 364

Event chronology
| ← Previous; Dominion 6.9 in Osaka-jo Hall | Next → Kizuna Road; CEO×NJPW: When Worlds Collide |

Lion's Gate Project chronology
| ← Previous; Lion's Gate Project 12 | Next → — |

The thirteenth Lion's Gate Project event was held on June 13, 2018, in Tokyo at Shinjuku Face. Some matches featured outside participation: Shunsuke Sayama, from Asuka Project, who made his New Japan Pro-Wrestling debut, and Dinosaur Takuma and Ayato Yoshida from Kaientai Dojo (K-Dojo).

| No. | Results | Stipulations | Times |
|---|---|---|---|
| 1 | Yota Tsuji vs. Yuya Uemura ended in a time limit draw | Singles match | 10:00 |
| 2 | Ren Narita defeated Shunsuke Sayama | Singles match | 08:02 |
| 3 | Manabu Nakanishi and Toa Henare defeated Hiroyoshi Tenzan and Dinosaur Takuma | Tag team match | 10:33 |
| 4 | Yuji Nagata defeated Tomoyuki Oka | Singles match | 12:38 |
| 5 | Ayato Yoshida defeated Shota Umino | Singles match | 16:47 |

== See also ==
- New Japan Pro-Wrestling
- NEVER
