= Taguchi Japan =

Professional wrestling stable

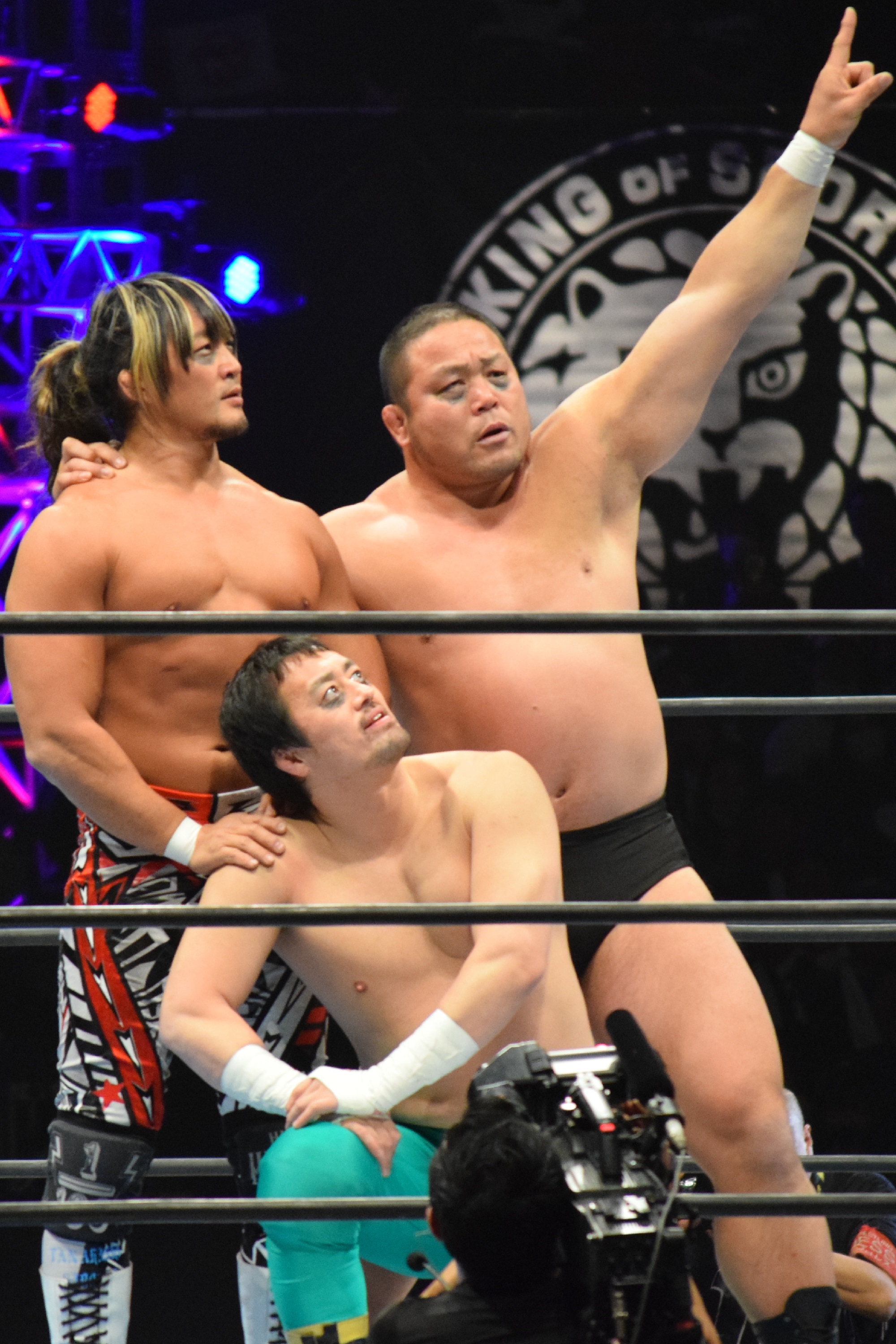
- Founding members (clockwise from top left) Hiroshi Tanahashi, Manabu Nakanishi and leader Ryusuke Taguchi in February 2017

Stable
- Members: Ryusuke Taguchi (leader); David Finlay; Togi Makabe; Hiroshi Tanahashi; Kushida; Sami Callihan; A. C. H. Master Wato
- Debut: January 5, 2017
- Years active: 2017–present

Taguchi Japan (タグチジャパン, Taguchi Japan) is a professional wrestling stable in the Japanese promotion New Japan Pro-Wrestling (NJPW). The group was formed the night after Wrestle Kingdom 11 on January 5, 2017. Starting out as a trio formed by Hiroshi Tanahashi, Manabu Nakanishi and Ryusuke Taguchi, the stable appointed Taguchi as their namesake and leader, and have gone on to primarily feud with Los Ingobernables de Japón over the IWGP Intercontinental, IWGP Junior Heavyweight, and NEVER Openweight 6-Man Tag Team Championships. Later members included Juice Robinson, Michael Elgin and Ricochet.

The stable initially found its roots within the tag team of Tanahashi and Elgin, as well as their occasional team-ups with Robinson. After an eye injury suffered by Elgin, Tanahashi teamed with Nakanishi and Taguchi to capture the NEVER Openweight 6-Man Tag Team Championship from Los Ingobernables de Japón, leading to the official foundation of the stable. Once Elgin was healed, he was invited into the stable, along with Robinson and Ricochet, the latter of whom had recently lost the NEVER Openweight 6-Man Tag Team Championship to L.I.J. Their membership was certified when Ricochet teamed with Taguchi and Tanahashi to win the NEVER Openweight 6-Man Tag Team Championship on April 4.

Due to Taguchi Japan open door policy, several wrestlers such as Yoshitatsu, Katsuya Kitamura and War Machine (Hanson and Raymond Rowe) have made one-off appearances representing the stable. However, the regular members were Tanahashi, Makabe, Kojima, Nakanishi, Kushida, Ricochet and Finlay.

== History ==
=== Background (2016) ===
Through ROH's working relationship with NJPW, Ring of Honor mainstay Michael Elgin made his debut for NJPW by taking part in the 2015 G1 Climax between July 23 and August 15. Elgin quickly became popular among Japanese crowds and his performance in the tournament was called a "career resurgence".

On February 20, it was reported that Elgin had signed a two-year deal with NJPW. This was confirmed by NJPW on March 3 and on March 20, he and Hiroshi Tanahashi teamed with Juice Robinson to unsuccessfully challenge Bullet Club (Kenny Omega and The Young Bucks) for the NEVER Openweight 6-Man Tag Team Championship.

On April 10, Elgin and Tanahashi teamed with Yoshitatsu at Invasion Attack 2016, to win the titles from Bullet Club. They made their first successful defense on April 23 against Bad Luck Fale, Kenny Omega and Yujiro Takahashi. before losing the championships back to The Elite at Wrestling Dontaku 2016.

On June 19 at Dominion 6.19 in Osaka-jo Hall, Elgin replaced an injured Hiroshi Tanahashi and defeated Kenny Omega in NJPW's first ever ladder match to become the new IWGP Intercontinental Champion. On September 25 at Destruction in Kobe, Elgin lost the IWGP Intercontinental Championship to Tetsuya Naito, beginning a feud between Elgin, Tanahashi and several others with Naito's Los Ingobernables de Japón stable. At Wrestle Kingdom 11, Tanahashi unsuccessfully challenged Naito for the IWGP Intercontinental Championship.

=== Taguchi Japan (2017) ===
On January 5, 2017, the day after Wrestle Kingdom 11 in Tokyo Dome, Tanahashi teamed with Ryusuke Taguchi and Manabu Nakanishi to defeat Los Ingobernables de Japón (Bushi, Evil and Sanada to win the NEVER Openweight 6-Man Tag Team Championship. Shortly afterwards, the group became known as "Taguchi Japan", while adding Elgin, David Finlay, Dragon Lee and Kushida as members. They lost the title back to L.I.J. on February 11 at The New Beginning in Osaka, while Elgin unsuccessfully challenged Naito for the IWGP Intercontinental Championship. On March 6 at NJPW's 45th anniversary event, Taguchi unsuccessfully challenged Hiromu Takahashi for the IWGP Junior Heavyweight Championship. Over the following month, Taguchi Japan expanded to also include Juice Robinson and Ricochet. On April 4, Taguchi, Ricochet and Tanahashi defeated L.I.J. to bring the NEVER Openweight 6-Man Tag Team Championship back to Taguchi Japan. On April 29 at Wrestling Toyonokuni 2017, members of Taguchi Japan and L.I.J. faced off two title matches, which were both won by L.I.J. with Hiromu Takahashi retaining the IWGP Junior Heavyweight Championship against Ricochet and Tetsuya Naito retaining the IWGP Intercontinental Championship against Juice Robinson. On May 3 at Wrestling Dontaku 2017, Taguchi Japan lost the NEVER Openweight 6-Man Tag Team Championship back to L.I.J. Also in May, Satoshi Kojima joined Taguchi Japan as a replacement for an injured Hiroshi Tanahashi. On June 3, Kushida defeated Will Ospreay in the final to win his second Best of the Super Juniors. On June 11 at Dominion 6.11 in Osaka-jo Hall, Kushida defeated Hiromu Takahashi to win the IWGP Junior Heavyweight Championship for the fifth time. Later that same event, Tanahashi defeated Tetsuya Naito to win the IWGP Intercontinental Championship. As part of Taguchi Japan, Taguchi and Ricochet formed a tag team named "Funky Future", defeating The Young Bucks for the IWGP Junior Heavyweight Tag Team Championship on August 13. On October 9 at King of Pro-Wrestling, Funky Future lost the IWGP Junior Heavyweight Tag Team Championship to Roppongi 3K (Sho and Yoh), while Kushida lost the IWGP Junior Heavyweight Championship to Will Ospreay. Ricochet blamed himself for Funky Future's loss and resigned not only from Taguchi Japan, but NJPW altogether immediately following the match.

== Current members ==
*	Founding member
I	First leader

Member		Duration
Ryusuke Taguchi (leader)	I *	January 5, 2017 – present
Master Wato		August 7, 2021 – present

=== Former members ===
Member		Duration
Hanson		August 11, 2017 – January 5, 2018
Hiroshi Tanahashi	*	January 5, 2017 – January 4, 2026
Juice Robinson		February 21, 2017 – May 1, 2022
Kushida		March 21, 2017 – January 29, 2019
Manabu Nakanishi	*	January 5, 2017 – January 7, 2020
Raymond Rowe		August 11, 2017 – January 5, 2018
Ricochet		March 24, 2017 – October 9, 2017
Yoshitatsu		April 14, 2017 - May 4, 2017

=== Sub-groups ===
Affiliate	Members	Tenure	Type	Promotion(s)
FinJuice	David Finlay; Juice Robinson	2017–2022	Tag team	NJPW; Impact Wrestling
War Machine	Hanson; Raymond Rowe	2017–2018	Tag team	NJPW
6 Or 9	Master Wato; Ryusuke Taguchi	2021–present	Tag team	NJPW

== Championships and accomplishments ==
- New Japan Pro-Wrestling
  - IWGP Junior Heavyweight Championship (1 time) – Kushida
  - IWGP Junior Heavyweight Tag Team Championship (1 time) – Ricochet and Taguchi
  - NEVER Openweight 6-Man Tag Team Championship (2 times) – Nakanishi, Taguchi and Tanahashi (1), Ricochet, Taguchi and Tanahashi (1)
  - Best of the Super Juniors (2017) – Kushida
- Ring of Honor
  - ROH World Television Championship (1 time) – Kushida
