= Tanga Loa =

American professional wrestler (born 1983)

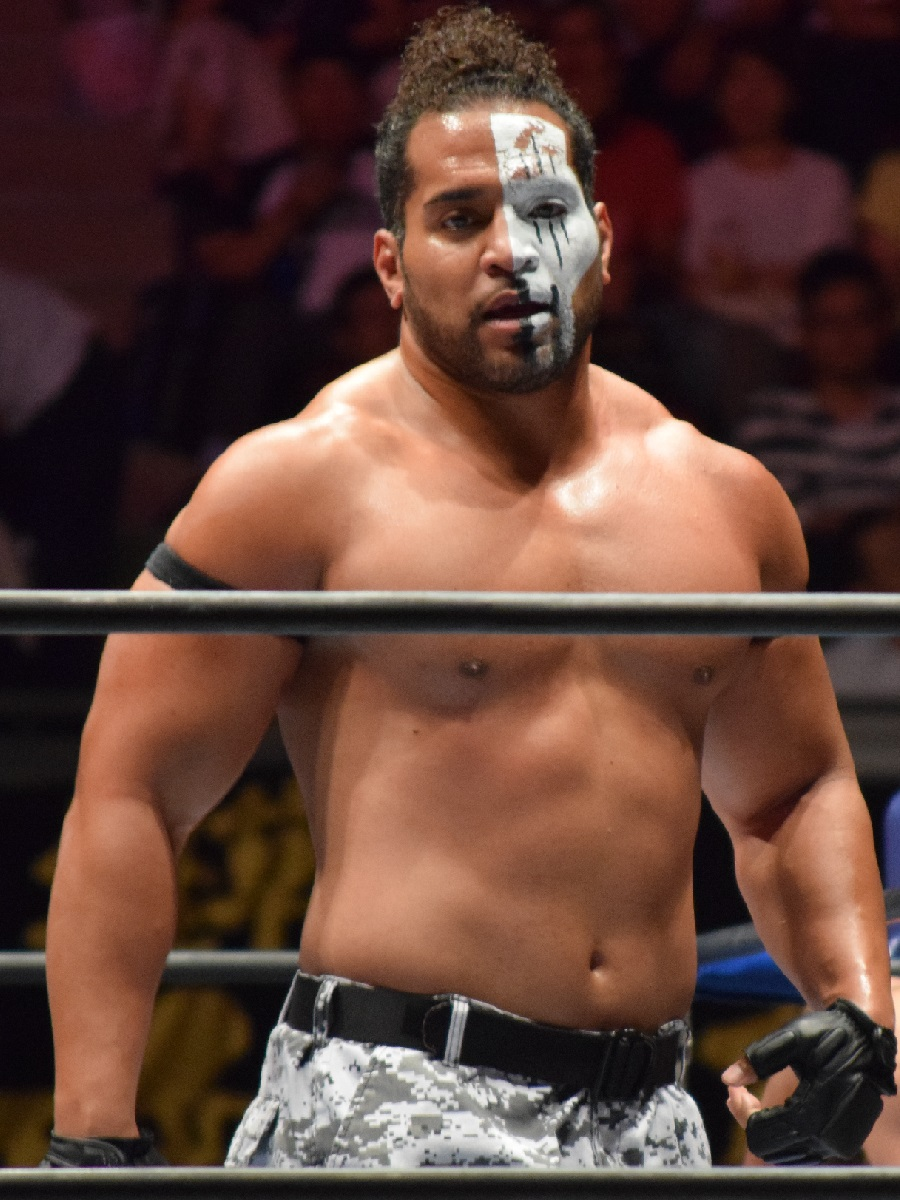
- Loa in 2016

Personal information
- Born: Tevita Tu'amoeloa Fetaiakimoeata Fifita; May 7, 1983 (age 43) Honolulu, Hawaii, U.S.
- Education: University of Texas at El Paso
- Parent: Haku (father)
- Relatives: Tama Tonga (cousin); Hikuleo (cousin)

Professional wrestling career
- Ring name(s): Camacho; Agent T Donny Marlow; Micah; Nuku; Tanga Loa; Tanga Roa; Tevita Fifita; Tonga; Tonga Loa
- Billed height: 6 ft 2 in (188 cm)
- Billed weight: 220 lb (100 kg)
- Billed from: Florida; Honolulu, Hawaii; Juárez, Mexico
- Trained by: D-Von Dudley; Bubba Ray Dudley; Florida Championship Wrestling; Ricky Santana; Haku
- Debut: November 8, 2008

Tevita Tu'amoeloa Fetaiakimoeata Fifita (born May 7, 1983) is an American professional wrestler. He is known for his tenures in New Japan Pro-Wrestling (NJPW) as Tanga Loa and WWE as Tonga Loa.

Fifita started his professional wrestling career in WWE's farm territory Florida Championship Wrestling (FCW) in 2009 as at first Tonga, then later known as Agent T and Donny Marlow. He was promoted to the main roster in 2011, where he worked as a Mexican character named Camacho in a tag team with Hunico. They worked on the undercard on the SmackDown and NXT brands for a few years. After he left WWE in 2014, he worked for two years in Total Nonstop Action Wrestling (TNA) under the name Micah, where he won the 2015's Gut Check. Later, he left the promotion and joined New Japan Pro-Wrestling (NJPW) under the ring name Tanga Loa, joining his brother Tama Tonga as Guerrillas of Destiny (G.O.D.), a subgroup of the heel faction Bullet Club. In NJPW, Loa and Tonga are seven-time IWGP Tag Team Champions and former three-time NEVER Openweight 6-Man Tag Team Champions with Bad Luck Fale and Taiji Ishimori. He also has made appearances in Ring of Honor (ROH), where the Guerrillas of Destiny are former one-time ROH World Tag Team Champions. He worked for WWE for a second time from 2024 to 2026, under the ring name Tonga Loa as a member of The Bloodline and MFTs.

Fifita is part of the Fifita wrestling family, being the son of Haku and brother of Tama Tonga and Talla Tonga.

== Early years ==
Born in Honolulu, Hawaii, Fifita attended the University of Texas at El Paso, where he played football as a defensive end. Fifita graduated with a degree in liberal arts with major in Communications Electronic Media and minor in criminal justice.

== Professional wrestling career ==
=== World Wrestling Entertainment/WWE (2009–2014) ===
==== Florida Championship Wrestling (2009–2011) ====
After taking part in a World Wrestling Entertainment (WWE) tryout alongside his adoptive brother Alipate, Fifita signed a developmental contract with the promotion on February 10, 2009, and was assigned to its developmental territory Florida Championship Wrestling (FCW) as Tonga. In March, he became known as Agent T, as part of Abraham Washington's Secret Service stable, alongside Agent D and Agent J. He later changed his name to Donny Marlow. On July 21, 2011, Marlow and CJ Parker defeated Calvin Raines and Big E Langston to win the FCW Florida Tag Team Championship. On November 3, Marlow and Parker lost the Tag Team Championship to Brad Maddox and Briley Pierce.

==== Teaming with Hunico (2011–2013) ====
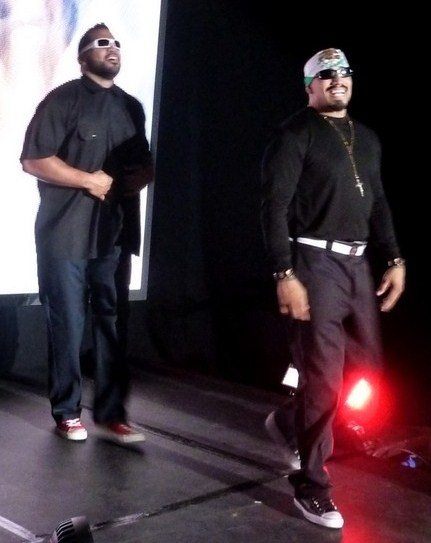
Camacho (left) and Hunico in November 2013

On the December 15, 2011, episode of Superstars, Fifita came to the ring as the new enforcer of Hunico, and his new ring name was revealed as Camacho. Hunico and Camacho first teamed together on the April 26 episode of Superstars where they beat the Usos. Camacho made his pay-per-view debut at Over the Limit, where he was defeated by Ryback in a singles match. Camacho began appearing again on WWE's developmental territory, the former FCW, which had been rebranded into NXT Wrestling; He made his NXT debut on the July 4, 2012, episode of the rebooted NXT, first losing to Seth Rollins but emerging victorious later that episode in a six-man tag match while teaming with Hunico and Michael McGillicutty against Rollins, Bo Dallas, and Tyson Kidd. On the next episode of NXT, Camacho defeated Kidd in a singles match following a distraction from McGillicutty. In the pre-show of Money in the Bank, he and Hunico lost to the WWE Tag Team Champions, Kofi Kingston and R-Truth in a non-title match. At Raw 1,000, Camacho, along with Hunico and four other wrestlers attempted to ambush Kane to make a statement, but The Undertaker's return resulted in Brothers of Destruction disposing of all six would-be attackers. With Hunico out injured, Camacho continued to compete on NXT; after a $5,000 bounty was promised to anyone who could put Big E Langston "on the shelf"; Camacho attempted to claim the bounty in late-2012 so that he could "get Hunico out of Mexico", but he was squashed by Langston. On April 4, 2013, Camacho reunited with Hunico at the WrestleMania Axxess live event. On the November 6, 2013, episode of Main Event he and Hunico made their first televised tag team match since July 2012, losing to The Usos. He and Hunico then started a feud against The Ascension, defeating them in a non-title match, but were then defeated in a NXT championship match.

==== NXT and departure (2014) ====
Once Hunico started portraying Sin Cara again, Camacho started to wrestle solo on NXT. Camacho scored a rare victory over the returning Oliver Grey at the March 13 television tapings. His last feud in WWE was with Adam Rose on NXT, which began when he attacked one of Rose's followers after a match and ended at NXT Takeover when Camacho lost to Rose. On June 12, 2014, Camacho was released from his contract.

=== Total Nonstop Action Wrestling (2015–2016) ===
On February 16, 2015, Fifita participated at Total Nonstop Action Wrestling's TNA One Night Only's Gut Check, where he won a tournament to earn a spot in the company. On March 15, 2015, Fifita, under the ring name of Micah and announcing himself as the son of Haku, made his debut at Impact Wrestling as a member of The Rising, a stable consisting of himself, Drew Galloway, and Eli Drake. On the April 24 edition of Impact Wrestling, Micah defeated Kenny King. On the May 22 episode of Impact Wrestling, Micah wrestled against Kenny King for his TNA X Division Championship, but failed to win the title. On the June 3 episode of Impact Wrestling, The Rising defeated The Beat Down Clan. On the July 1 edition of Impact Wrestling, The Beat Down Clan defeated The Rising in a 4-on-3 handicap match, forcing The Rising to dissolve. On the September 9 edition of Impact Wrestling, Micah, Tigre Uno and Robbie E defeated Jessie Godderz, Kenny King and his former partner Eli Drake in a six-man tag team match. From October to November (during which Impact Wrestling had been taped from July 22-July 25), Micah participated in the TNA World Title Series in the "Future 4" group, during which he earned 4 points and thus failed to qualify for the successive round of 16. On the December 16 edition of Impact Wrestling, Micah wrestled his final match for TNA, where he teamed up with Eli Drake, Jessie Godderz and Crimson in a losing effort against Tigre Uno, DJ Z, Manik and Mandrews in an Eight-Man Tag Team match. Micah did not appear after this leading to his release.

=== New Japan Pro-Wrestling (2016–2024) ===
On March 12, 2016, Fifita was announced as the newest member of New Japan Pro-Wrestling (NJPW) stable Bullet Club. The announcement was made by his brother Tama Tonga, who challenged Togi Makabe and Tomoaki Honma to a match for the IWGP Tag Team Championship at Invasion Attack 2016. Two days later, Fifita was given the new ring name Tanga Loa (sometimes spelled "Tanga Roa"), while his team with his brother was dubbed Guerrillas of Destiny (G.O.D). Fifita's ring name was taken from Tangaloa, a family of gods in Tongan mythology. Loa made his NJPW debut on March 27 by attacking Togi Makabe during his match with Tonga, causing a disqualification. Loa's debut match took place on April 1, when he and Bullet Club stablemates Tonga, Bad Luck Fale, Kenny Omega and Yujiro Takahashi were defeated by Makabe, Honma, Juice Robinson, Hiroshi Tanahashi and Michael Elgin in a ten-man elimination tag team match. On April 10 at Invasion Attack 2016, G.O.D defeated Makabe and Honma to become the new IWGP Tag Team Champions. They lost the title to The Briscoe Brothers (Jay and Mark) on June 19 at Dominion 6.19 in Osaka-jo Hall. On October 10 at King of Pro-Wrestling, the Guerrillas of Destiny regained the IWGP Tag Team Championship from the Briscoe Brothers. In December, the Guerrillas of Destiny won their block in the 2016 World Tag League with a record of six wins and one loss and advanced to the finals of the tournament. On December 10, the Guerrillas of Destiny were defeated in the finals of the tournament by Togi Makabe and Tomoaki Honma. On January 4, 2017, Loa and Tonga lost the IWGP Tag Team Championship to Tomohiro Ishii and Toru Yano in a three-way match, also involving Makabe and Honma. On June 11 at Dominion 6.11 in Osaka-jo Hall, Loa and Tonga defeated War Machine (Hanson and Raymond Rowe) to win the IWGP Tag Team Championship for the third time. They lost the title back to War Machine in a no disqualification match on July 1 at G1 Special in USA. In December, Guerrillas of Destiny won their block in the 2017 World Tag League with a record of five wins and two losses, advancing to the finals of the tournament. On December 11, they were defeated in the finals of the tournament by Los Ingobernables de Japón (Evil and Sanada). Six days later, Guerrillas of Destiny and Bad Luck Fale defeated Evil, Sanada and Bushi to become the new NEVER Openweight 6-Man Tag Team Champions. They lost the title to Chaos (Beretta, Tomohiro Ishii and Toru Yano) in a five-team gauntlet match on January 4, 2018, at Wrestle Kingdom 12 in Tokyo Dome. The following day at New Year's Dash, they would regain the title from Chaos.

At The New Beginning in Sapporo, Bullet Club stablemate Cody turned on the leader of the stable, Kenny Omega. This led to there being two sides to Bullet Club; Team Cody and Team Kenny. While Tama and Loa stayed neutral at Strong Style Evolved before a tag team match against Marty Scurll and Cody, Loa speaking for both himself and his brother, stated if they were to be on a team it wouldn't be Team Cody. On the first night of the Wrestling Dontaku 2018 shows, G.O.D and Fale lost the NEVER Openweight 6-Man Tag Team Championship to the Super Villains (Marty Scurll and the Young Bucks). The second night, Tama debuted the newest member to Bullet Club, Taiji Ishimori. Later, it was announced that Tama will be competing in the G1 Climax 28.

At the G1 Special in San Francisco, Tama, Loa, King Haku, Chase Owens, and Yujiro Takahashi defeated CHAOS members Gedo, Yoshi-Hashi, and Roppongi 3K (Rocky Romero, Sho and Yoh), with Tama pinning Gedo after a Tongan Death Grip by Haku to Gedo followed by a Gun Stun. At the end of the night, following Kenny's victory over Cody in the main event, Tama, Loa, and Haku came out to seemingly celebrate with Kenny and the Young Bucks in a show of loyalty, only to attack The Elite, as well as fellow Bullet Club members Hangman Page, Marty Scurll, even Chase and Takahashi, and finally Cody, when they tried to intervene. They then left the ring declaring that they were the true Bullet Club. On January 30, 2019, they lost the NEVER Openweight 6-Man Championship against Ryusuke Taguchi, Makabe and Yano. On February 23, 2019, they would regain the IWGP Heavyweight Tag Team Titles by defeating Sanada & Evil at Honor Rising 2019: Day 2, starting their fifth reign. After defending the championships seven times, their reign would end when G.O.D lost to FinJuice (Juice Robinson & David Finlay) at Wrestle Kingdom 14. They would soon immediately regain the belts at The New Beginning in the USA event in Atlanta, before again losing them without a defence to Golden*Ace (Hiroshi Tanahashi & Kota Ibushi) on a New Japan Road show in Korakuen Hall.

After the 2020 Pandemic, Guerrillas of Destiny would make their return to Japan as participants of the World Tag League. They would win the tournament for the first time after defeating FinJuice in the finals. They would go on to win an IWGP Tag Team Title match at the Tokyo Dome for the first time, defeating champions Dangerous Tekkers (Taichi & Zack Sabre Jr.) after Loa hit 'ApeSh*t' (a Sitout Reverse Piledriver) on Taichi after 19 minutes & 18 seconds. They lost the championships back to the Dangerous Tekkers on June 1. On June 1, 2022, Tanga Loa suffered an injury to his right knee, it is later confirmed by his brother, Tama, that Loa suffered a torn MCL on his right knee. He underwent successful operation but missed out the remainder of 2022. Loa returned to NJPW in July 2023, competing in the annual G1 Climax tournament. Loa competed in the B Block, finishing with 6 points and therefore failing to advance to the quarterfinals.

On March 31, 2024, at Road to Sakura Genesis, he wrestled his final NJPW match, challenging for the KOPW trophy in a losing effort to The Great O-Khan.

=== Consejo Mundial de Lucha Libre (2016) ===
On June 1, 2016, the Mexican Consejo Mundial de Lucha Libre (CMLL) promotion announced Roa and Tonga as participants in the 2016 International Gran Prix. On June 24, Roa, Tonga and Sam Adonis defeated Atlantis, Diamante Azul and Volador Jr. in Arena México. On July 1, Roa took part in the 2016 International Gran Prix, from which he was eliminated by Último Guerrero.

=== Return to WWE (2024–2026) ===
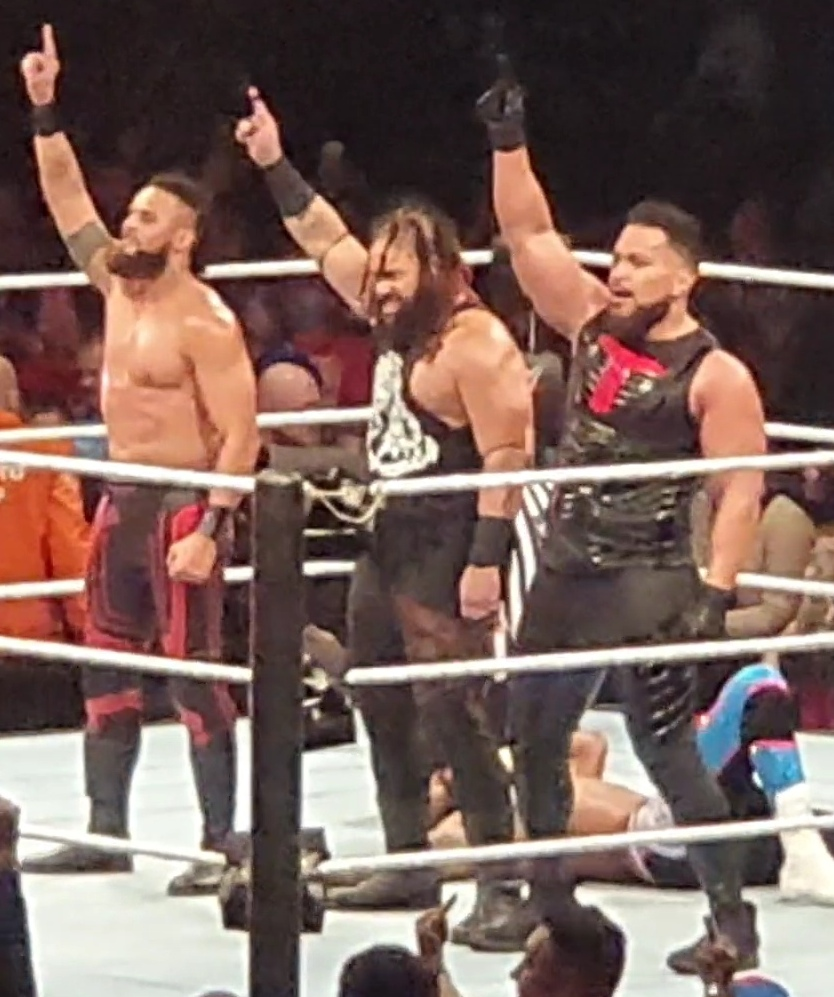
Loa (right) with Jacob Fatu (center) and Tama Tonga (left) at a house show in November 2024

Fifita made his return to WWE after nearly ten years at Backlash France on May 4, 2024, under the tweaked ring name Tonga Loa, assisting Solo Sikoa and his brother Tama Tonga in defeating Kevin Owens and Randy Orton in a Tag Team Street Fight establishing himself as a heel in the process and joining The Bloodline. His previous run as Camacho was not mentioned on WWE programming. Loa made his WWE in-ring return on the May 31 episode of WWE SmackDown, teaming with his brother Tama, now going by the tag team name of "The Tongans", to defeat Street Profits (Angelo Dawkins and Montez Ford). On the August 23 episode of SmackDown, Solo Sikoa had Jacob Fatu relinquish his share of the title to Loa so that Fatu could be Sikoa's personal enforcer. On the October 25 episode of SmackDown, Loa and Tonga lost the titles to The Motor City Machine Guns (Alex Shelley and Chris Sabin) after interference from Jey Uso ending their reign at 84 days. At Survivor Series: WarGames on November 30, Loa along with The Bloodline and Bronson Reed lost to Roman Reigns, The Usos, Sami Zayn and CM Punk in a WarGames match. After the match, it was revealed that Loa suffered a torn bicep and would be out of action for seven to eight months.

On June 28 at Night of Champions, Loa returned from injury, where he assisted Sikoa in defeating Jacob Fatu for the WWE United States Championship. After Night of Champions, Loa, Sikoa, JC Mateo, and the debuting Talla Tonga (formerly known as "Hikuleo") rebranded the Bloodline as the "MFT" (standing for "My Family Tree").

On May 2, 2026, Loa was released from WWE, ending his second tenure with the promotion.

== Championships and accomplishments ==
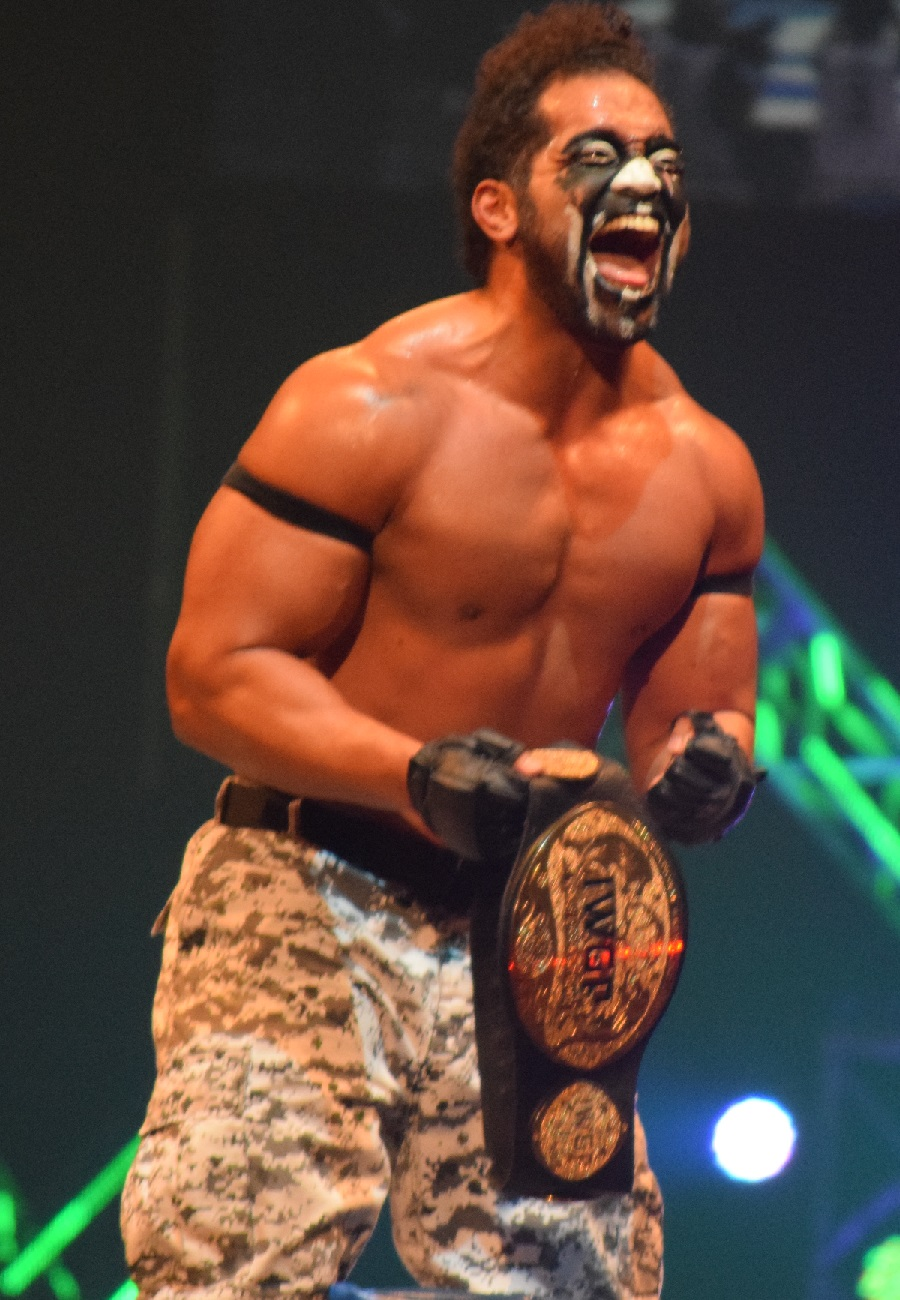
Loa as one half of the IWGP Tag Team Champions in November 2016

- Florida Championship Wrestling
  - FCW Florida Tag Team Championship (1 time) – with CJ Parker
- New Japan Pro-Wrestling
  - IWGP Tag Team Championship (7 times) – with Tama Tonga
  - NEVER Openweight 6-Man Tag Team Championship (3 times) – with Bad Luck Fale and Tama Tonga (2), and Taiji Ishimori and Tama Tonga (1)
  - World Tag League (2020) – with Tama Tonga
- Pro Wrestling Illustrated
  - Faction of the Year (2024) – with The Bloodline
  - Ranked No. 97 of the top 500 singles wrestlers in the PWI 500 in 2019
  - Ranked No. 6 of the top 50 tag teams in the PWI Tag Team 50 in 2020 with Tama Tonga
- Ring of Honor
  - ROH World Tag Team Championship (1 time) – with Tama Tonga
- Total Nonstop Action Wrestling
  - TNA Gut Check (2015)
- WrestleCircus
  - WC Big Top Tag Team Championship (1 time) – with Tama Tonga
- WWE
  - WWE Tag Team Championship (1 time) – with Tama Tonga
