= Dominion 6.19 in Osaka-jo Hall =

2016 New Japan Pro-Wrestling event

- Promotional poster for the event, featuring various NJPW wrestlers
- Promotion: New Japan Pro-Wrestling
- Date: June 19, 2016
- City: Osaka, Japan
- Venue: Osaka-jō Hall
- Attendance: 9,925

Event chronology
← Previous; Best of the Super Juniors XXIII	Next → Kizuna Road

Dominion chronology
← Previous; 7.5	Next → 6.11

New Japan Pro-Wrestling events chronology
← Previous; Lion's Gate Project 2	Next → Lion's Gate Project 3

Dominion 6.19 in Osaka-jo Hall was a professional wrestling event promoted by New Japan Pro-Wrestling (NJPW). The event took place on June 19, 2016, in Osaka, Osaka, at the Osaka-jō Hall and was the eighth event under the Dominion name and second in a row to take place at the Osaka-jō Hall.

The event featured ten matches with six of NJPW's seven championships on the line. The main event saw Kazuchika Okada defeat Tetsuya Naito to win the IWGP Heavyweight Championship for the fourth time. Other top matches included Michael Elgin defeating Kenny Omega in NJPW's first-ever ladder match to win the IWGP Intercontinental Championship and Kushida successfully defending the IWGP Junior Heavyweight Championship against 2016 Best of the Super Juniors winner Will Ospreay. All in all, the event featured five title changes.

== Production ==
=== Background ===
In July 2015, NJPW returned to the Osaka-jō Hall for the first time in 21 years, drawing a full capacity crowd for Dominion 7.5 in Osaka-jo Hall, which was dubbed a "great success" for the company. On January 4, 2016, NJPW made the official announcement of a return to Osaka-jō Hall the following June. In addition to airing worldwide on the NJPW World internet streaming service, the event also aired in Japan through SKY PerfecTV! as well as in various cinemas across the country through Live Viewing Japan.

=== Storylines ===
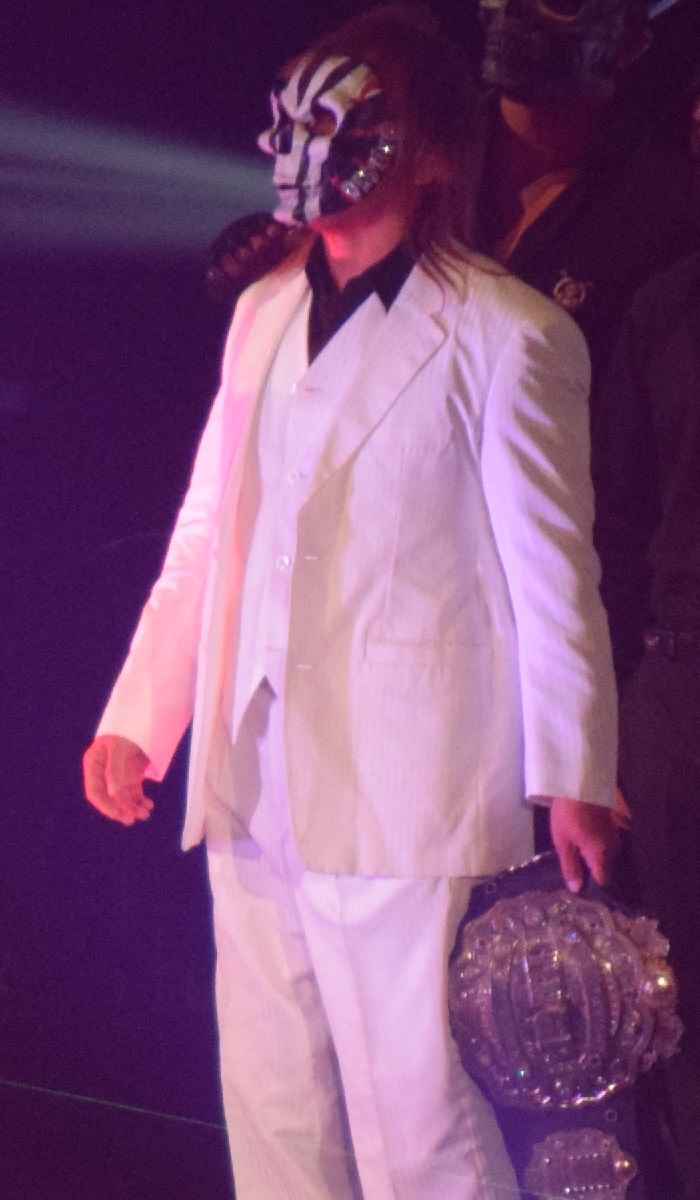
Tetsuya Naito, who defended the IWGP Heavyweight Championship in the main event

Dominion 6.19 in Osaka-jo Hall featured ten professional wrestling matches that involved different wrestlers from pre-existing scripted feuds and storylines. Wrestlers portrayed villains, heroes, or less distinguishable characters in the scripted events that built tension and culminated in a wrestling match or series of matches.

Dominion 6.19 in Osaka-jo Hall was main evented by Tetsuya Naito defending the IWGP Heavyweight Championship against Kazuchika Okada. This was a rematch from April's Invasion Attack 2016, where Naito defeated Okada to win the IWGP Heavyweight Championship for the first time. Naito's win came due to outside interference from his Los Ingobernables de Japón (L.I.J.) stablemates Bushi, Evil and the debuting Sanada, which led to the continuation of a storyline rivalry between L.I.J. and Okada's Chaos stable over the next tour. On May 3 at Wrestling Dontaku 2016, Naito made his first successful defense of the IWGP Heavyweight Championship against Chaos member Tomohiro Ishii. After the match, Okada, who had defeated L.I.J. member Sanada earlier in the event, entered the ring and had a staredown with Naito, indicating he wanted the next title shot. The match was made official for Dominion 6.19 in Osaka-jo Hall three days later. Naito invited NJPW owner Takaaki Kidani to come witness the match, having earlier accused him of being in cahoots with Okada. Naito claimed that his L.I.J. stablemate Evil was a more worthy title contender than Okada and suspected that Kidani had secured Okada the title shot at Dominion 6.19 in Osaka-jo Hall. Naito noted the surge in his popularity over the past year, comparing the reception he had gotten during NJPW's 2015 North American tour to the one had gotten during the May 2016 tour and claimed he was now more popular than Okada. He confronted Kidani on May 18 at an expo in Singapore and again invited him to Dominion 6.19 to witness his popularity. On the tour leading to Dominion 6.19, Naito got the best of Okada with help from his L.I.J. stablemates. However, days prior to the event, Naito stated that he would agree to arrive to the match without his stablemates by his side as long as Okada also agreed to arrive without his manager Gedo by his side.

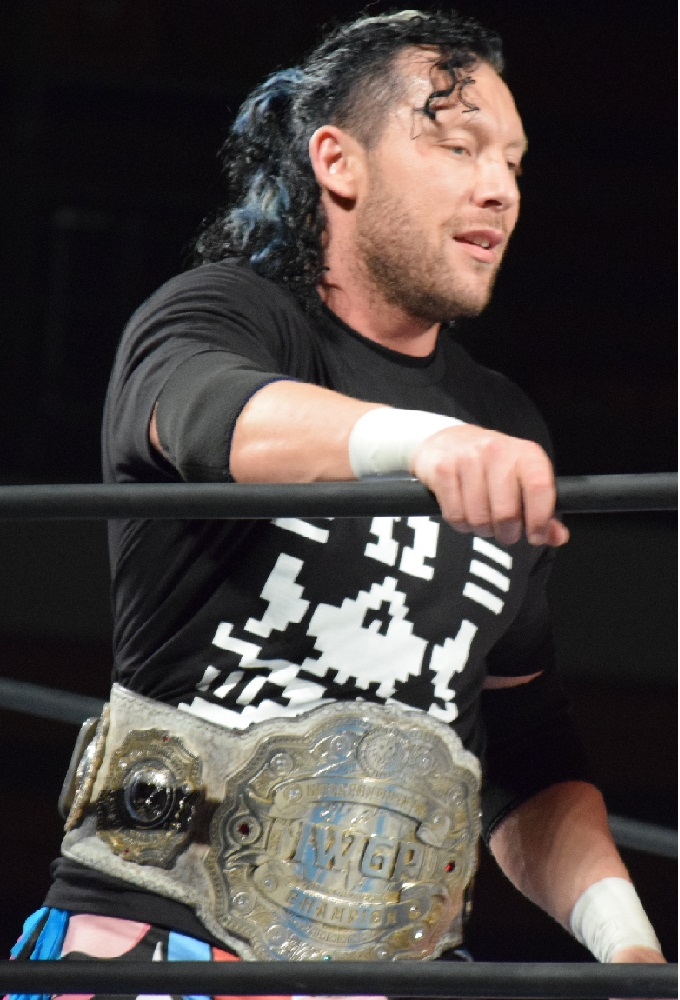
Kenny Omega, who defended the IWGP Intercontinental Championship in NJPW's first-ever ladder match

Dominion 6.19 in Osaka-jo Hall was also scheduled to feature a ladder match for the IWGP Intercontinental Championship between champion Kenny Omega and challenger Hiroshi Tanahashi. Earlier in the year, the IWGP Intercontinental Championship had been vacated after Shinsuke Nakamura departed NJPW, leading to a match on February 14, 2016, at The New Beginning in Niigata, where Omega defeated Tanahashi to become the new champion. Over the next months, Omega and Tanahashi faced off in many matches involving the NEVER Openweight 6-Man Tag Team Championship. The first title match occurred on March 20 and saw Tanahashi, Michael Elgin and Juice Robinson fail in their attempt to capture the title from Omega and his Bullet Club stablemates The Young Bucks (Matt and Nick Jackson). Tanahashi and Elgin then replaced Robinson with Yoshitatsu and on April 10 at Invasion Attack 2016, the three defeated Omega and The Young Bucks to become the new NEVER Openweight 6-Man Tag Team Champions. After a successful title defense against Omega and two other Bullet Club members, Bad Luck Fale and Yujiro Takahashi, on April 23, Tanahashi, Elgin and Yoshitatsu lost the title back to Omega and The Young Bucks on May 3 at Wrestling Dontaku 2016. Tanahashi had originally challenged Omega to an IWGP Intercontinental Championship rematch on April 27, but was turned down by the champion, who kicked Tanahashi low, raised a ladder on top of him and climbed on top of it, before stating that he never wanted to face Tanahashi again. After the match at Wrestling Dontaku 2016, Tanahashi repeated his challenge. Initially, Omega again turned down the challenge, but then added that if Tanahashi agreed to a ladder match, he would grant him the title shot. The two climbed up on the opposite sides of a ladder and shook hands to set the match up, which was made official three days later. This would mark the first-ever ladder match in NJPW history.

On May 21, Omega and Bullet Club attacked Tanahashi with a ladder and chairs, after which Tanahashi was pulled from the rest of the tour with a left shoulder avulsion fracture and a biceps tear. The angle was set up to cover for a legitimate injury Tanahashi had suffered earlier in the month and give him time to recover before Dominion 6.19. However, on June 3, Tanahashi announced he would be forced to miss Dominion 6.19 due to his injury. This led to Michael Elgin, who had been working opposite Omega in Tanahashi's absence, stepping up and volunteering to take Tanahashi's place in the ladder match. Omega and Elgin had previously faced off on April 27, when Omega successfully defended the IWGP Intercontinental Championship against Elgin in the first all-Canadian NJPW main event. Elgin had a ladder match history, having worked matches with the stipulation in 2006 and 2008. Initially, Omega rejected Elgin as Tanahashi's replacement, but changed his mind after being pinned by Elgin in a tag team match on June 7. The match was made official the following day.

Dominion 6.19 in Osaka-jo Hall also featured Yuji Nagata defending the NEVER Openweight Championship against Katsuyori Shibata in a rematch from Wrestling Dontaku 2016. On February 11 at The New Beginning in Osaka, NJPW's veteran wrestlers, the so called "third generation", came together to announce an "uprising", which Katsuyori Shibata, the reigning NEVER Openweight Champion, took exception to. After successfully defending the title against Satoshi Kojima and Hiroyoshi Tenzan, Shibata failed in his third defense against third generation's last representative with the 48-year old Yuji Nagata becoming the new NEVER Openweight Champion at Wrestling Dontaku 2016. Three days after the event, NJPW announced a rematch between the two for Dominion 6.19 in Osaka-jo Hall. Nagata stated that he had nominated Shibata as his first challenger due to feeling that the two could revive "strong style" wrestling, which in his mind was fading away from NJPW. He added that it was time for NJPW to show that no one outside of the promotion could embody the style, referring to the "King of Strong Style" Shinsuke Nakamura, who had recently left the promotion for WWE.

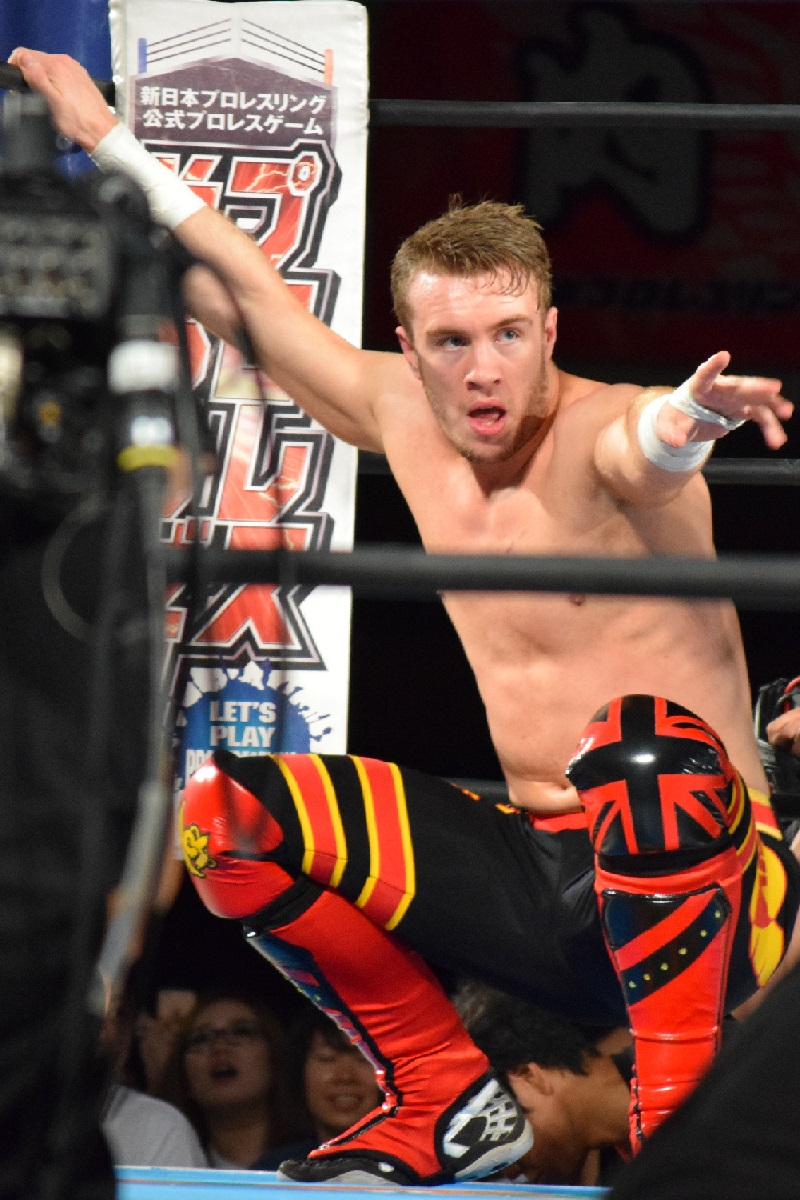
Will Ospreay, the winner of the 2016 Best of the Super Juniors, who challenged for the IWGP Junior Heavyweight Championship at the event

On June 7, Will Ospreay defeated Ryusuke Taguchi in the finals to win the 2016 Best of the Super Juniors tournament. After his win, Ospreay proceeded to challenge IWGP Junior Heavyweight Champion Kushida to a title match. Kushida accepted the challenge, stating he wanted to find out who was the strongest between the two. The match was made official for Dominion 6.19 in Osaka-jo Hall the next day. Kushida and Ospreay had previously met at April's Invasion Attack 2016, where Kushida retained the IWGP Junior Heavyweight Championship against Ospreay in his NJPW debut match.

During the final day of the 2016 Best of the Super Juniors, the reigning IWGP Junior Heavyweight Tag Team Champions Matt Sydal and Ricochet accepted challenges from both reDRagon (Bobby Fish and Kyle O'Reilly) and Roppongi Vice (Beretta and Rocky Romero) to set up a three-way match for the title at Dominion 6.19 in Osaka-jo Hall. All six men had taken part in the Best of the Super Juniors tournament with Sydal, O'Reilly and Romero in Block A and Ricochet, Fish and Beretta in Block B. In the head-to-head matches, Sydal defeated both O'Reilly and Romero, finishing second in his block with ten points, while Romero defeated O'Reilly with both finishing at eight points. In Block B, Ricochet and Fish finished tied second in the block at 8 points, with Ricochet defeating both Fish and Beretta, who finished last in the block with six points with a loss to Fish. The following day, NJPW announced that The Young Bucks (Matt Jackson and Nick Jackson), who had missed the Best of the Super Juniors due to injuries, would be added to the match, after the two had sent a video from the United States, making a title challenge. Following a suggestion made by The Young Bucks, the match was also changed to an elimination format.

The rest of the matches for Dominion 6.19 in Osaka-jo Hall were announced on June 8, including an IWGP Tag Team Championship match, where Guerrillas of Destiny (Tama Tonga and Tanga Loa) defend the title against the Ring of Honor team The Briscoe Brothers (Jay and Mark). The match was set up during May's War of the Worlds tour, co-produced by NJPW and ROH in North America. On May 14, Jay Briscoe pinned Loa to win an eight-man tag team match between Team ROH and Bullet Club and afterwards announced that he and his brother were coming to NJPW to take the IWGP Tag Team Championship from Loa and Tonga. Also added were two matches in the feud between the Chaos and L.I.J. stables, with Hirooki Goto facing Evil in a singles match, and Tomohiro Ishii and Yoshi-Hashi facing Bushi and Sanada in a tag team match. Dominion 6.19 in Osaka-jo Hall was also set to feature the NJPW debut of Bullet Club's newest member, Hangman Page, who joined the stable during the War of the Worlds tour. In the pre-show match, Jay White would make his final NJPW appearance before leaving on an indefinite learning excursion to ROH.

== Event ==
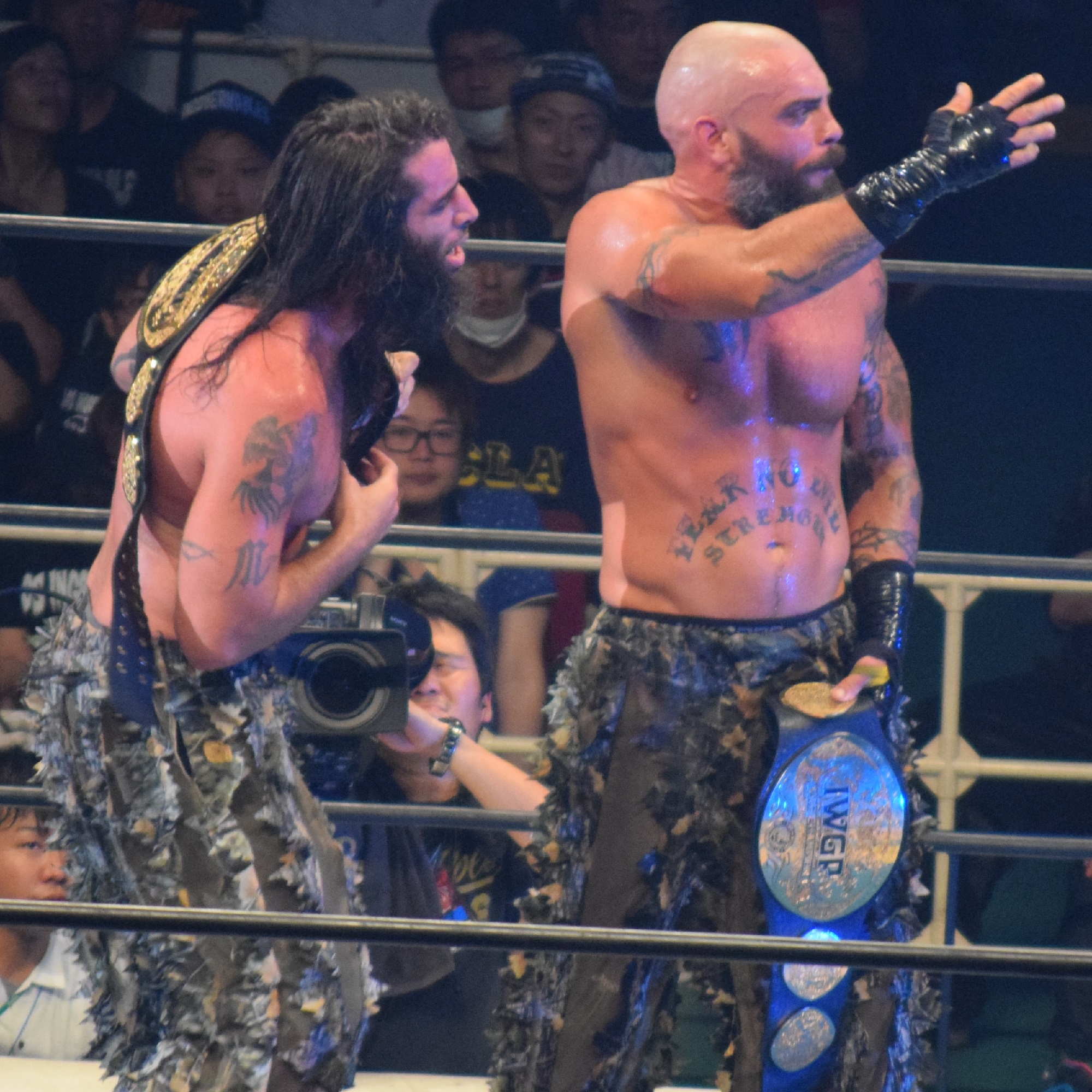
The Briscoe Brothers after winning the IWGP Tag Team Championship at the event

The first title match of the show featured Matt Sydal and Ricochet defending the IWGP Junior Heavyweight Tag Team Championship in a four-way elimination match. The match featured an added stipulation where a team could be eliminated by throwing them over the top rope out of the ring. After both Roppongi Vice and reDRagon had been eliminated via over-the-top tope eliminations, Matt Jackson pinned Sydal after the Meltzer Driver to win the title for The Young Bucks for a record-breaking fifth time. The next match saw Kushida retain the IWGP Junior Heavyweight Championship in a match against the 2016 Best of the Super Juniors winner Will Ospreay by submitting his challenger with the Hoverboard Lock. This marked Kushida's fifth successful title defense.

The third title match saw the Briscoe Brothers defeat Tama Tonga and Tanga Loa to become the new IWGP Tag Team Champions. Afterwards, the new champions were attacked by Tonga and Loa's Bullet Club stablemates Hangman Page and Yujiro Takahashi, who asserted themselves as their first challengers. The next match featured another title change as Katsuyori Shibata defeated Yuji Nagata to regain the NEVER Openweight Championship. Afterwards, Nagata endorsed Shibata as Shinsuke Nakamura's "strong style" successor. Meanwhile, Tomoaki Honma expressed his interest in being Shibata's first title challenger.

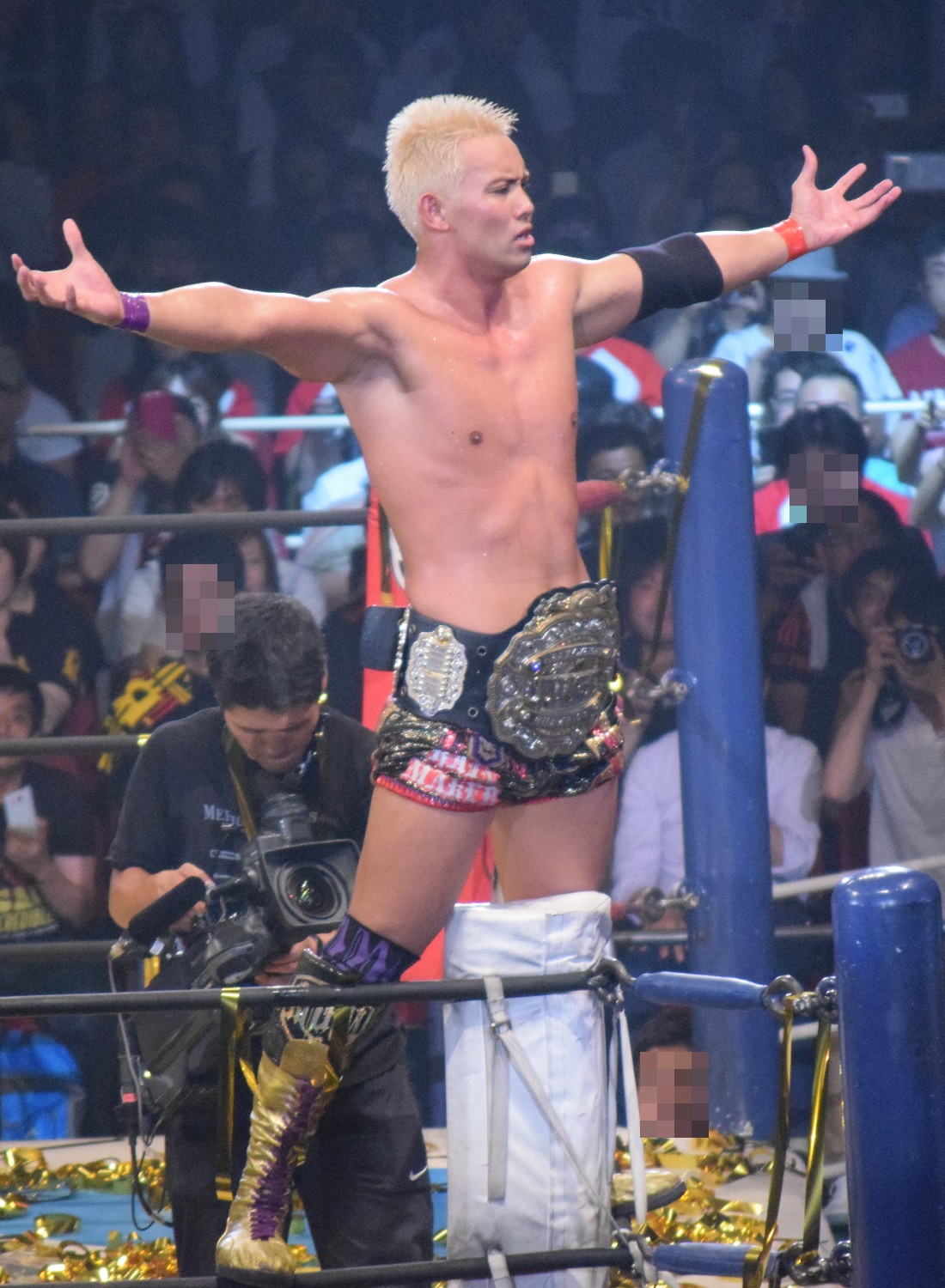
In the main event, Kazuchika Okada won the IWGP Heavyweight Championship for the fourth time

The semi-main event of the show featured Kenny Omega defending the IWGP Intercontinental Championship against Michael Elgin in NJPW's first-ever ladder match. Omega was accompanied to the match by Hangman Page and Yujiro Takahashi as opposed to his usual partners The Young Bucks. However, before the match referee Red Shoes Unno found The Young Bucks hiding under the ring and ejected all four from ringside. All four, however, eventually returned and handcuffed Elgin to the ring ropes. After a failed attempt to even the odds from Captain New Japan and Yoshitatsu, Matt Sydal came out to distract Bullet Club, while Ricochet dove onto them from the ring. As Omega went to climb the ladder to grab the title belt to win the match, Elgin broke free of the handcuffs and tipped over the ladder with Omega falling out of the ring onto the wrestlers outside. Elgin then climbed the ladder and grabbed the belt to become the new IWGP Intercontinental Champion.

In the main event Tetsuya Naito defended the IWGP Heavyweight Championship against Kazuchika Okada. As per pre-match agreement, the match was kept one-on-one with neither Okada's manager Gedo nor Naito's L.I.J. stablemates being involved. The match ended with Okada hitting Naito with three Rainmakers to become the new IWGP Heavyweight Championship. With Chaos also defeating L.I.J. in both of the undercard matches on the show, this meant a clean 3–0 sweep for the Chaos stable. Okada won the title for the fourth time, while Naito's two-month reign ended in his second title defense.

== Reception ==
Dave Meltzer of the Wrestling Observer Newsletter wrote that the last three matches of the show were all "excellent and completely different", giving the main event four and a half stars out of five, the IWGP Intercontinental Championship match four and three quarter stars and the NEVER Openweight Championship match four and a quarter stars. He, however, criticized some of the booking decisions, such as taking the IWGP Heavyweight Championship off Tetsuya Naito after just 70 days and Will Ospreay losing to Kushida for the second title match in a row. Meltzer also called for the merger of the two tag team divisions, stating that the fans in attendance did not care about the match between the Guerrillas of Destiny and the Briscoe Brothers and would not care about the upcoming match between the Briscoe Brothers and the team of Hangman Page and Yujiro Takahashi.

James Caldwell of Pro Wrestling Torch gave the main event four and a quarter stars and the IWGP Intercontinental Championship match four and a half stars out of five. Sean Radican, also of Pro Wrestling Torch, gave the show a score of 9.0, writing "[t]he main highlight of this show was the last three matches which ranged from very good to excellent".

== Results ==
No.	Results	Stipulations	Times
1^{P}	Daisan Sedai Trio (Hiroyoshi Tenzan, Manabu Nakanishi and Satoshi Kojima) defeated Dojo Boys (David Finlay, Jay White and Juice Robinson)	Six-man tag team match	07:53
2	Bullet Club (Bad Luck Fale, Hangman Page and Yujiro Takahashi) defeated Hunter Club (Captain New Japan and Yoshitatsu) and Togi Makabe	Six-man tag team match	07:05
3	Chaos (Tomohiro Ishii and Yoshi-Hashi) defeated Los Ingobernables de Japón (Bushi and Sanada)	Tag team match	07:51
4	Hirooki Goto defeated Evil	Singles match	09:51
5	The Young Bucks (Matt Jackson and Nick Jackson) defeated Matt Sydal and Ricochet (c), reDRagon (Bobby Fish and Kyle O'Reilly) and Roppongi Vice (Beretta and Rocky Romero)	Four-way tag team elimination match for the IWGP Junior Heavyweight Tag Team Championship	15:23
6	Kushida (c) defeated Will Ospreay	Singles match for the IWGP Junior Heavyweight Championship	14:36
7	The Briscoe Brothers (Jay Briscoe and Mark Briscoe) defeated Guerrillas of Destiny (Tama Tonga and Tanga Loa) (c)	Tag team match for the IWGP Tag Team Championship	14:02
8	Katsuyori Shibata defeated Yuji Nagata (c) (with Hiroyoshi Tenzan, Manabu Nakanishi and Satoshi Kojima)	Singles match for the NEVER Openweight Championship	14:53
9	Michael Elgin defeated Kenny Omega (c) (with Hangman Page and Yujiro Takahashi)	Ladder match for the IWGP Intercontinental Championship	33:32
10	Kazuchika Okada defeated Tetsuya Naito (c)	Singles match for the IWGP Heavyweight Championship	28:58
(c) / – the champion(s) heading into the match; P / – the match was broadcast on the pre-show

=== Tag team elimination match ===
Elimination	Wrestler	Team	Eliminated by	Elimination move	Time	Ref.
1	Rocky Romero	Roppongi Vice	Nick Jackson	Tossed over the top rope	08:17	
2	Bobby Fish	reDRagon	Matt Sydal	Tossed over the top rope	09:26	
3	Matt Sydal	Matt Sydal and Ricochet (c)	Matt Jackson	Pinned after a Meltzer Driver	15:23	
Winners:	The Young Bucks (Matt and Nick Jackson) (New IWGP Junior Heavyweight Tag Team Champions)					
