= Katsuya Kitamura =

Japanese professional wrestler (1985–2022)

Personal information
- Born: December 14, 1985 Suginami-ku, Tokyo, Japan
- Died: October 12, 2022 (aged 36)

Professional wrestling career
- Billed height: 183 cm (6 ft 0 in)
- Billed weight: 120 kg (265 lb)
- Trained by: NJPW Dojo
- Debut: 2015
- Retired: 2018

Katsuya Kitamura (北村 克哉, Kitamura Katsuya; December 14, 1985 – October 12, 2022) was a Japanese professional wrestler, bodybuilder and an amateur wrestler trained by New Japan Pro-Wrestling (NJPW), where he was the winner of the 2017 Young Lion Cup.

== Amateur wrestling career ==
Prior to becoming a professional wrestler, Kitamura was a highly accomplished amateur wrestler, known for being one of the largest wrestlers in all of Japan. Because of his size and physique, he earned the nickname "Wrestling Monster". He attended Senshu University, where he was a part of their wrestling team. In 2006, he won the All Japan Wrestling Championship in the 120 kg category, and later on in the same year represented Japan in the World Championships. Throughout his amateur career, Kitamura would go on to win three national championships and represent Japan on a global level twice. As well as amateur wrestling, Kitamura took part in the 2015 Ganryū-jima fighting tournament, where he defeated a Mongolian Sumo wrestler.

=== Steroids and ban ===
On June 13, 2011, Kitamura was banned from amateur wrestling for two years after testing positive for anabolic steroids, specifically, the illegal muscle building drug drostanolone. Kitamura was being tipped as a possible member of Japan's Olympic wrestling team for the 2012 London Olympic Games, but the ban ruled him out of participation. He did not appeal against the ban, but said that he "took them by accident after buying some supplements from abroad".

== Professional wrestling career ==
Kitamura began training in the New Japan Pro-Wrestling (NJPW) dojo in 2015. His first match in NJPW was not a traditional professional wrestling match, but rather a dark amateur wrestling exhibition at Lion's Gate Project 1, where he wrestled fellow trainee Tomoyuki Oka to a time limit draw.

After undergoing further training, Kitamura wrestled his first ever professional match on September 1, 2016, at Lion's Gate Project 3, another dark match where he and Oka once again wrestled to a draw. On March 13, 2017, he made his televised debut, teaming with Oka in a loss to the Guerrillas of Destiny (Tama Tonga and Tanga Loa). The following day, Kitamura teamed with Katsuyori Shibata and Yuji Nagata in a loss to TenCozy (Satoshi Kojima and Hiroyoshi Tenzan) and Juice Robinson. The day after that, he once again lost to Tonga and Loa, this time teaming with Nagata.

On June 24, 2017, three months after his debut, Kitamura won the first match in his career when he teamed with Tomoyuki Oka to defeat Manabu Nakanishi and Tetsuhiro Yagi in a tag match. Kitamura and Oka continued teaming regularly, eventually dubbing their team "Monster Rage". At the end of 2017, Kitamura took part in two tournaments held by NJPW; the 2017 World Tag League and the 2017 Young Lion Cup. In the World Tag League, Kitamura and fellow young lion David Finlay finished last in their block after losing all seven of their matches. Meanwhile, in the Young Lion Cup, Kitamura emerged victorious after winning all five of his matches. On January 5 at New Year's Dash, Katsuya began a Seven Trial series of matches where he would face seven different wrestlers. He lost his first of seven matches to Jay White at New Year Dash. At the New Beginning in Sapporo he lost his second match of seven to Michael Elgin and his third the following day to Juice Robinson. At the Road to The New Beginning event from Korakuen Hall he lost his fourth match against Hiroyoshi Tenzan, and the fifth against Manabu Nakanishi. At The New Beginning in Osaka on February 10, he lost match #6 against Yuji Nagata. At The New Beginning in Hiroshima he was scheduled to face Manabu Nakanishi, but he suffered a cerebral concussion and was unable to compete. It was reported that the severity of the injury may force him to retire. He later injured his leg in a scooter accident. After almost a year with little news or updates on his condition, Kitamura left NJPW on January 31, 2019.

== Mixed martial arts career ==
Kitamura made his mixed martial arts debut against Bobby Ologun at Rizin 32 on November 20, 2021, He lost the bout via rear-naked choke in the second round.

== Death ==
Kitamura died on October 12, 2022, at age 36; reportedly, he felt unwell and called an ambulance to take him to a hospital, where his condition rapidly deteriorated. The cause of death was not released publicly.

== Championships and accomplishments ==
=== Amateur wrestling ===
- Japan Wrestling Federation
  - All Japan Wrestling Championship in the 120 kg category

=== Professional wrestling ===
- New Japan Pro-Wrestling
  - Young Lion Cup (2017)
- Wrestling Observer Newsletter
  - Rookie of the Year (2017)

== Mixed martial arts record ==
Professional record breakdown
1 match	0 wins	1 loss
By submission	0	1

Res.	Record	Opponent	Method	Event	Date	Round	Time	Location	Notes
Loss	0–1	Bobby Ologun	Submission (rear-naked choke)	Rizin 32	November 20, 2021	2	2:34	Okinawa, Japan	
