= Dominion 6.9 in Osaka-jo Hall =

Dominion 6.9 in Osaka-jo Hall could refer to multiple instances of New Japan Pro Wrestling's annual June NJPW Dominion event that took place on June 9, but in different years:

- Dominion 6.9 in Osaka-jo Hall (2018)
- Dominion 6.9 in Osaka-jo Hall (2019)
- Dominion 6.9 in Osaka-jo Hall (2024)
