= Golden Lovers =

Professional wrestling tag team

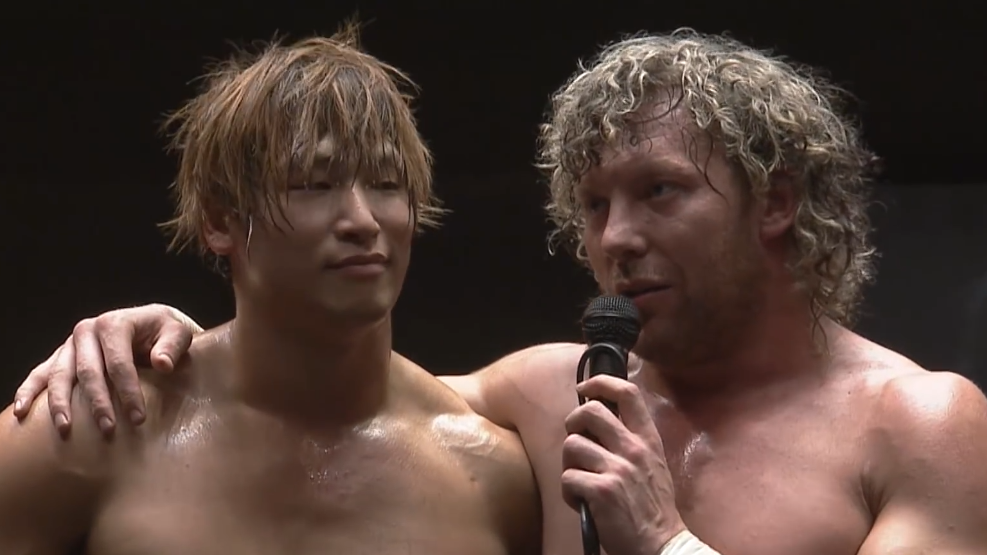
- Golden Lovers (Kota Ibushi and Kenny Omega) in 2018

Tag team
- Members: Kenny Omega; Kota Ibushi
- Name: Golden☆Lovers
- Billed heights: Omega: 6 ft 0 in (1.83 m); Ibushi: 5 ft 11 in (1.80 m)
- Combined billed weight: 434 lb (197 kg)
- Debut: January 2009
- Years active: 2009–2014; 2018–2019; 2023; 2025–present

The Golden Lovers (ゴールデン☆ラヴァーズ, Gōruden Ravāzu; stylized as Golden☆Lovers) are a professional wrestling tag team consisting of Kota Ibushi and Kenny Omega. They perform in All Elite Wrestling (AEW).

The team was formed in 2009 in the Japanese promotion DDT Pro-Wrestling, where they would win the KO-D Tag Team Championship on two occasions. They also made appearances for New Japan Pro-Wrestling (NJPW), where they won the IWGP Junior Heavyweight Tag Team Championship once. They disbanded when Omega left DDT in 2014, but have since reunited on multiple occasions.

== History ==
=== DDT Pro-Wrestling (2009–2014) ===
In July 2008, Canadian wrestler Kenny Omega started his first Japanese tour with the DDT Pro-Wrestling promotion, where he quickly became friends with Kota Ibushi, with the two forming a tag team named "Golden☆Lovers" in January 2009. On January 24, Ibushi and Omega defeated Harashima and Toru Owashi to win the KO-D Tag Team Championship for the first time. After one successful defense, they lost the title to Francesco Togo and Piza Michinoku on May 10. Over the following years, Omega and Ibushi established themselves as one of the top tag teams on the Japanese independent circuit.

Meanwhile, in DDT, Ibushi and Omega came together with Gota Ihashi to form the Golden☆Rendez-Vous stable, with the three holding the KO-D 6-Man Tag Team Championship from May 26 to June 23, 2013. On January 26, 2014, the Golden☆Lovers won the KO-D Tag Team Championship for the second time by defeating reigning champions Yankee Nichōkenjū (Isami Kodaka and Yuko Miyamoto) and the team of Konosuke Takeshita and Tetsuya Endo in a three-way match. On April 12, Ibushi and Omega became double champions, when the two, along with the newest member of the Golden☆Rendez-Vous stable, Daisuke Sasaki, defeated Team Drift (Keisuke Ishii, Shigehiro Irie and Soma Takao) for the KO-D 6-Man Tag Team Championship. The trio's reign lasted until May 4, when they were defeated by Shuten-dōji (Kudo, Masa Takanashi and Yukio Sakaguchi) in their second defense. Ibushi and Omega continued holding the KO-D Tag Team Championship until September 28, 2014, when they were defeated by Konosuke Takeshita and Tetsuya Endo.

On October 3, 2014, Omega announced he was leaving DDT and signing with NJPW, where Ibushi was already a semi-regular. However, with Ibushi having recently moved to NJPW's heavyweight division, Omega stated that the Golden☆Lovers were done as a tag team due to him wanting to remain in the junior heavyweight division. The Golden☆Lovers wrestled their final match together on October 26, 2014, when they defeated Danshoku Dino and Konosuke Takeshita in Omega's DDT farewell match.

=== New Japan Pro-Wrestling (2010–2011, 2018–2019) ===
On January 31, 2010, the Golden☆Lovers made their debut for New Japan Pro-Wrestling (NJPW), defeating Gedo and Jado by referee stoppage, when Jado was legitimately injured. Afterwards, the Golden☆Lovers engaged in a rivalry with Apollo 55, a tag team made up of Prince Devitt and Ryusuke Taguchi. On October 11 at NJPW's Destruction '10 event, the Golden☆Lovers defeated Apollo 55 to win the IWGP Junior Heavyweight Tag Team Championship, in a match that was later named the 2010 Match of the Year by Tokyo Sports, becoming the first junior heavyweight tag team match in history to win the award. After making successful title defenses against Apollo 55 and the team of Gedo and Jado, with both matches taking place back in DDT, Ibushi and Omega lost the title back to Apollo 55 on January 23, 2011, during NJPW's Fantastica Mania 2011 weekend. The Golden☆Lovers received a rematch for the title on August 14, but were again defeated by Apollo 55.

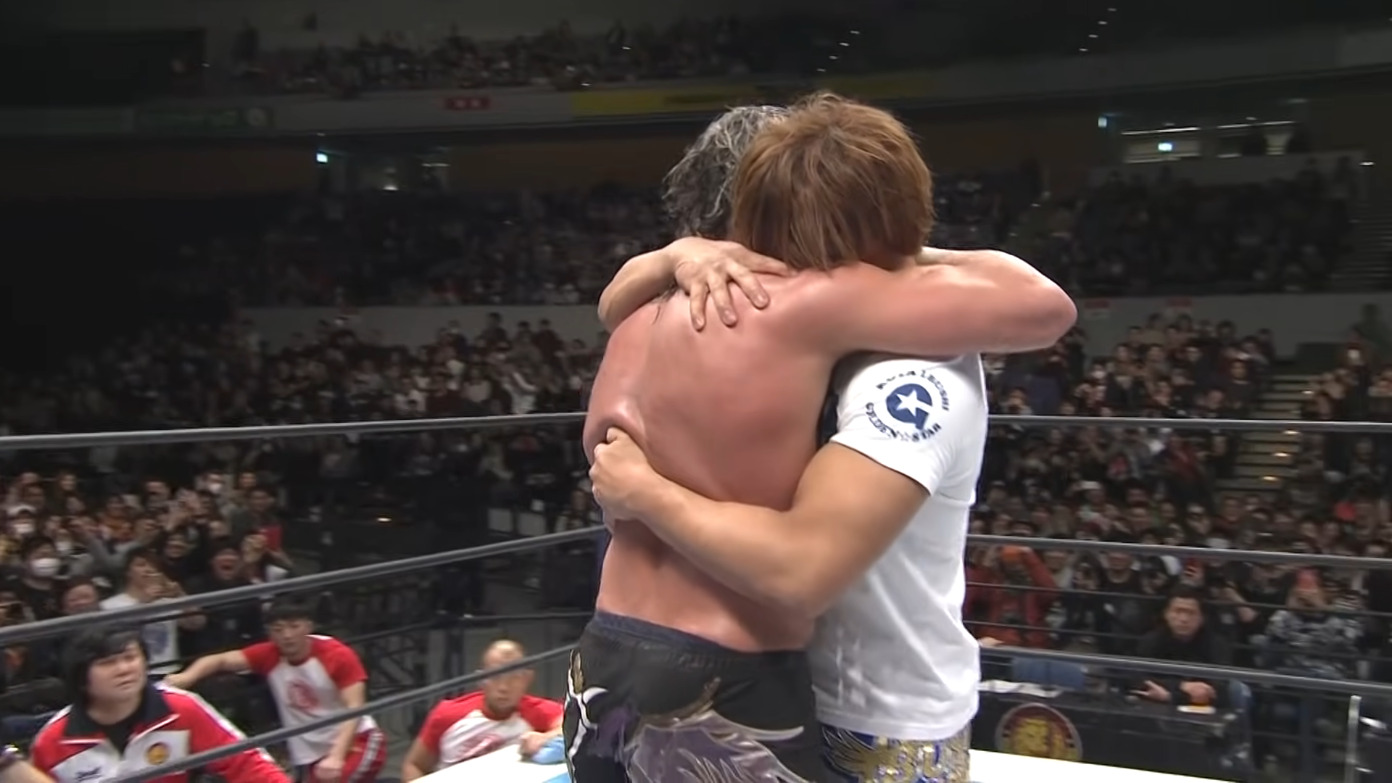
Kenny Omega and Kota Ibushi, when they reunited as a tag team in 2018

On January 28, 2018, the Golden☆Lovers were apparently reformed after Omega was seemingly kicked out of Bullet Club and attacked by fellow member Cody. Ibushi made the save for Omega as Bullet Club fled the scene. At first, Omega refused to shake Ibushi's hand, but moments after, both Omega and Ibushi emotionally embraced as confetti fell to the ring. At Honor Rising: Japan Night 2 on February 24, the Golden☆Lovers won their return match as a team against Cody and Marty Scurll. After the match, Omega and Ibushi were confronted by The Young Bucks and challenged to a match at Strong Style Evolved on March 25, which the Golden☆Lovers won.

At Dominion 6.9 in Osaka-jo Hall, Omega defeated Kazuchika Okada to win the IWGP Heavyweight Championship. After the match, Omega reunited with The Young Bucks, forming the Golden☆Elite along with Ibushi.

On the finals of the World Tag League, Ibushi defeated Hirooki Goto to win the NEVER Openweight Championship.

At Wrestle Kingdom, Ibushi lost the NEVER Openweight Championship to Will Ospreay and Omega lost the IWGP Heavyweight Championship to Hiroshi Tanahashi. At the end of January, Omega left NJPW to join All Elite Wrestling in the United States meanwhile Ibushi stayed in NJPW full-time, disbanding for the second time.

=== All Elite Wrestling (2023, 2025–present) ===
On the July 13 episode of AEW Dynamite, Ibushi was announced as the mystery partner of The Elite in their Blood and Guts match against the Blackpool Combat Club, thus reuniting with Omega and reforming the Golden Lovers, now under the "Golden Elite" name, which included teammates Hangman Page and the Young Bucks. On August 27 at All In, the Golden Lovers teamed with "Hangman" Adam Page to face Konosuke Takeshita and Bullet Club Gold (Jay White and Juice Robinson) at in a losing effort. On October 1 at WrestleDream, the Golden Lovers teamed with Chris Jericho in a losing effort against Takeshita, Sammy Guevara and Will Ospreay. On the November 15, 2023 episode of Dynamite, the Golden Lovers, Jericho, and Paul Wight defeated The Don Callis Family (Powerhouse Hobbs, Konosuke Takeshita, and Kyle Fletcher) and Brian Cage in a street fight. After this match, the team would go on hiatus due to Ibushi and Omega taking time off to recover from injuries.

On July 2 at Dynamite 300, Ibushi was defeated by Kazuchika Okada and was attacked by Okada and the Don Callis Family afterwards, leading to Omega coming to his aid, once again reuniting the Golden Lovers. On August 24 at Forbidden Door, the Golden Lovers teamed with Darby Allin, Hiroshi Tanahashi and Will Ospreay to defeat the Death Riders, The Young Bucks, and Gabe Kidd in a lights out steel cage match.

== Championships and accomplishments ==
- DDT Pro-Wrestling
  - KO-D 6-Man Tag Team Championship (2 times) – with Gota Ihashi (1) and Daisuke Sasaki (1)
  - KO-D Tag Team Championship (2 times)
  - KO-D Openweight Championship (2 times) – Omega (1), Ibushi (1)
- Japan Indie Awards
  - Best Bout Award (2012) Ibushi vs. Omega on August 18
  - Best Bout Award (2014) vs. Konosuke Takeshita and Tetsuya Endo on October 28
- New Japan Pro-Wrestling
  - IWGP Heavyweight Championship (1 time) – Omega
  - IWGP Junior Heavyweight Tag Team Championship (1 time)
  - NEVER Openweight Championship (1 time) – Ibushi
- Nikkan Sports
  - Best Tag Team Award (2010)
- SoCal Uncensored
  - Southern California Match of the Year (2018) vs. The Young Bucks on March 25
- Tokyo Sports
  - Best Bout Award (2010) vs. Apollo 55 on October 11
- Weekly Pro Wrestling
  - Best Bout Award (2010) vs. Prince Devitt and Ryusuke Taguchi (NJPW, October 11)
  - Best Tag Team Award (2010)
