= Dominion 7.5 in Osaka-jo Hall =

- Promotional poster for the event, featuring Kazuchika Okada, A.J. Styles, Shinsuke Nakamura, Togi Makabe and Hiroshi Tanahashi
- Promotion: New Japan Pro-Wrestling
- Date: July 5, 2015
- City: Osaka, Japan
- Venue: Osaka-jō Hall
- Attendance: 11,400

Pay-per-view chronology
| ← Previous; Global Wars: Night #1 | Next → G1 Climax 25 |

Dominion chronology
| ← Previous; 6.21 | Next → 6.19 |

New Japan Pro-Wrestling events chronology
| ← Previous; Global Wars '15 | Next → Destruction in Okayama |

Dominion 7.5 in Osaka-jo Hall was a professional wrestling pay-per-view (PPV) event promoted by New Japan Pro-Wrestling (NJPW). The event took place on July 5, 2015, in Osaka, Osaka, at the Osaka-jō Hall. The event featured ten matches (including one match on the pre-show) with all six of NJPW's championships on the line, main evented by an IWGP Heavyweight Championship match between champion A.J. Styles and challenger Kazuchika Okada.

In addition to airing worldwide through NJPW World, the event also aired in Japan as a regular PPV through SKY PerfecTV!. The event marked NJPW's first show in Osaka-jō Hall in 21 years and drew 11,400 fans to the arena. This was the seventh event under the Dominion name and the first to take place in July.

== Production ==
=== Background ===
Dominion 7.5 in Osaka-jo Hall was announced on November 8, 2014, during the Power Struggle event in Osaka. The event would mark NJPW's first show in the Osaka-jō Hall in 21 years. NJPW president Kaname Tezuka revealed that the decision to hold a show in the venue was made after the promotion sold out Osaka's Bodymaker Colosseum four times during 2014, claiming that they needed a bigger venue for the market. The event was to be part of NJPW's 2015 goal of expanding their presence in western Japan. The event was compared to 2014's Back to the Yokohama Arena, which was NJPW's first event in eleven years at the Yokohama Arena, but which was also ultimately deemed a failure for the company, drawing only an attendance of 7,800. Daily Sports wrote that it was imperative for NJPW to do better with Dominion 7.5 in Osaka-jo Hall, which could be seen by the promotion putting together a studded card, featuring matches for all six of its championships. All seated tickets for the event were sold out in advance.

=== Storylines ===
Dominion 7.5 in Osaka-jo Hall featured ten professional wrestling matches that involved different wrestlers from pre-existing scripted feuds and storylines. Wrestlers portrayed villains, heroes, or less distinguishable characters in the scripted events that built tension and culminated in a wrestling match or series of matches.

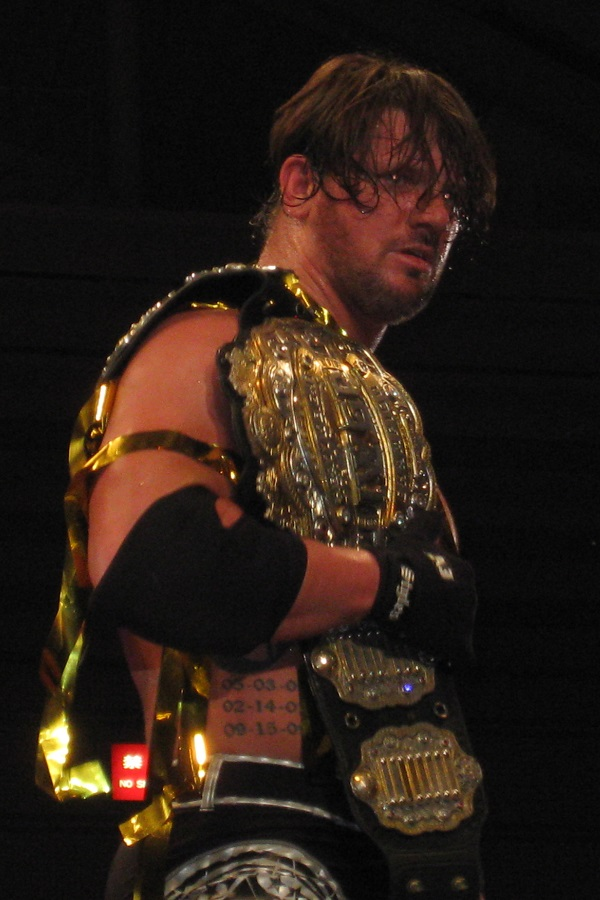
A.J. Styles, the reigning IWGP Heavyweight Champion, heading into Dominion 7.5 in Osaka-jo Hall

The first match for Dominion 7.5 in Osaka-jo Hall was announced on April 6, 2015, with A.J. Styles defending his IWGP Heavyweight Championship against Kazuchika Okada. Styles and Okada have been involved in a feud with each other ever since April 2014. After signing with NJPW, Styles made his debut appearance during Invasion Attack 2014, attacking then-champion Okada and aligning himself with the villainous Bullet Club stable. This led to a match on May 3 at Wrestling Dontaku 2014, where Okada and Styles faced off for the IWGP Heavyweight Championship. Okada was defeated, after Yujiro Takahashi betrayed him and his Chaos stable and jumped to Bullet Club, making Styles the sixth non-Japanese IWGP Heavyweight Champion in his first match under a NJPW contract. A rematch between the two was booked for Back to the Yokohama Arena on May 25, which saw Styles successfully defend his title. During the second half of 2014, Okada continued feuding with Bullet Club, primarily facing off against Styles' stablemates, including Doc Gallows and Karl Anderson, while also winning the 2014 G1 Climax tournament. Meanwhile, Styles lost the IWGP Heavyweight Championship to Hiroshi Tanahashi in his third defense on October 13 at King of Pro-Wrestling. After unsuccessfully challenging Tanahashi for the IWGP Heavyweight Championship on January 4, 2015, at Wrestle Kingdom 9 in Tokyo Dome, Okada entered a "slump", during which he feuded with another Bullet Club member, Bad Luck Fale. Meanwhile, after defeating Tetsuya Naito at Wrestle Kingdom 9 in Tokyo Dome, Styles re-entered the IWGP Heavyweight Championship picture and, on February 11 at The New Beginning in Osaka, defeated Tanahashi to regain the title. On April 5 at Invasion Attack 2015, Okada scored a decisive win over Fale, declared his "slump" over and concluded the event by attacking Styles, after he had retained the IWGP Heavyweight Championship against Kota Ibushi. The next day, the title match between the two was made official for Dominion 7.5 in Osaka-jo Hall, giving it a rare three-month build. In the subsequent three months, Styles' Bullet Club and Okada's Chaos stables faced off in multiple tag team matches with Styles' side winning all three of the matches that both he and Okada were involved in, though Styles did not score any of the wins directly over Okada. Okada, meanwhile, on two occasions laid Styles out with his Rainmaker finishing maneuver in post-match attacks. Compared to Styles' belittling of Okada in the build-up to the original Wrestling Dontaku 2014 title match between the two, he now admitted that Okada was one of NJPW's best wrestlers, but added that he himself was the world's best wrestler.

The second match for Dominion 7.5 in Osaka-jo Hall was announced on May 3, 2015, at Wrestling Dontaku 2015, where Bullet Club's Kenny Omega, having retained his IWGP Junior Heavyweight Championship against what he called "Japanese garbage" (Ryusuke Taguchi), "Mexican garbage" (Máscara Dorada) and "American garbage" (Alex Shelley), announced he would not enter the upcoming 2015 Best of the Super Juniors tournament, but would instead next defend his title against the winner of said tournament at Dominion 7.5 in Osaka-jo Hall. On June 7, Kushida defeated Kyle O'Reilly in the finals to win the 2015 Best of the Super Juniors. The nex day, the title match between Omega and Kushida was made official for July 5, marking the first time they fought in over two years, having previously met each other during the 2013 Best of the Super Juniors in a match, where Omega won. In the build-up to the title match, Omega stole Kushida's Best of the Super Juniors trophy, while also stating that after his win at Dominion 7.5 in Osaka-jo Hall, he would not defend his title again until the January 4 Dome Show in 2016. On July 3, during the final event before Dominion 7.5 in Osaka-jo Hall, Ricochet, the winner of the 2014 Best of the Super Juniors, made a surprise return to NJPW, challenging the winner of the Omega-Kushida match.

On May 7, NJPW announced the first seven matches for the event. Added was an IWGP Intercontinental Championship match between Hirooki Goto and Shinsuke Nakamura. This is a rematch from the main event of Wrestling Dontaku 2015, where Goto defeated Nakamura to capture the Intercontinental Championship. Also added was another title rematch, where Togi Makabe will defend the NEVER Openweight Championship against Tomohiro Ishii. The two had been involved in a rivalry since the previous November's Power Struggle event, where Makabe emerged as the next challenger for then NEVER Openweight Champion Ishii. On January 4, 2015, at Wrestle Kingdom 9 in Tokyo Dome, Makabe defeated Ishii to win the NEVER Openweight Championship for the first time, but was forced to vacate the title on February 14 after being unable to defend it in a rematch against Ishii due to influenza. Ishii then went on to defeat Makabe's G.B.H. stablemate Tomoaki Honma to reclaim the title. This led to a title match on April 29 at Wrestling Hinokuni, where Makabe again defeated Ishii to regain the NEVER Openweight Championship.

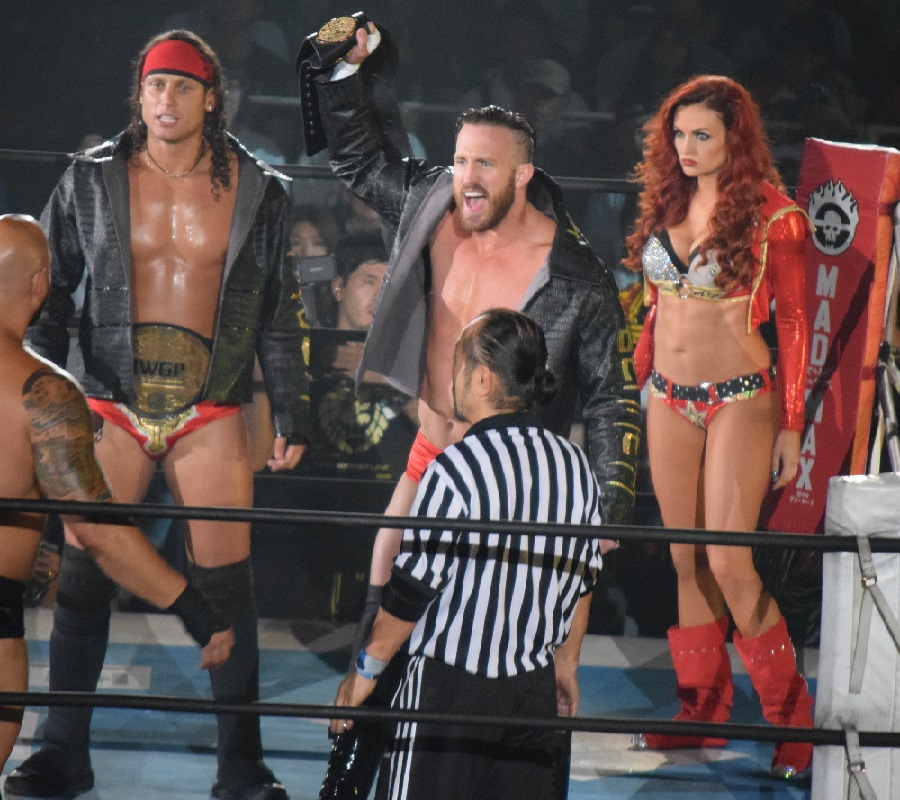
(Left to right) Matt Taven, Michael Bennett and Maria Kanellis, The Kingdom, who were involved in a storyline rivalry with Bullet Club, heading into Dominion 7.5 in Osaka-jo Hall

Also at Dominion 7.5 in Osaka-jo Hall, the Ring of Honor tag team The Kingdom (Matt Taven and Michael Bennett) were set to defend their IWGP Tag Team Championship against Bullet Club's Doc Gallows and Karl Anderson. The feud between both teams began on March 1 at ROH's 13th Anniversary Show, where Bennett and Taven pinned then IWGP Tag Team Champion Anderson to win a non-title three-way tag team match, after his partner Doc Gallows failed to make the event due to travel issues. This led to a match at Invasion Attack 2015, where Bennett and Taven defeated Anderson and Gallows to become the new IWGP Tag Team Champions, largely thanks to Bennett's wife Maria Kanellis distracting Anderson. After the event, Bullet Club recruited Gallows' wife Amber Gallows to take part in the first NJPW match involving female wrestlers since October 2002. The match took place at Wrestling Dontaku 2015 and saw Bennett, Taven and Kanellis defeat Anderson and the two Gallows with Kanellis pinning Amber for the win, after low blowing Anderson. Throughout the match, NJPW continued a storyline, where Anderson's infatuation with Kanellis distracted him from the match, but after the loss, Anderson turned on Kanellis and came together with Doc to perform their signature double-team move, Magic Killer, on her, before being chased away from the ring by Bennett and Taven. A title rematch, where The Kingdom would be accompanied by Kanellis and Bullet Club by Amber Gallows, was announced for Dominion 7.5 in Osaka-jo Hall on May 7.

Dominion 7.5 in Osaka-jo Hall was also set to feature the culmination of two big storyline rivalries that started in early 2015. In the first, Hiroshi Tanahashi will take on Toru Yano as part of a rivalry that started following March's 2015 New Japan Cup, where Yano scored an upset win over Tanahashi in the first round. In the following months, Yano's scored multiple wins over Tanahashi, before finally being pinned by Tanahashi in a six-man tag team match at Wrestling Dontaku 2015 on May 3. Using Yano's own tactics against him, Tanahashi pinned his rival by grabbing him by his hair and rolling him up for the win. In the second match, Katsuyori Shibata will take on his former mentor Kazushi Sakuraba. The two returned to NJPW from the world of mixed martial arts on August 12, 2012, and remained together as a tag team until 2014, when Shibata formed a new tag team with his former high school classmate Hirooki Goto, while Sakuraba formed a partnership with Toru Yano and the Chaos stable. Sakuraba and Shibata came on a collision course on April 5, 2015, at Invasion Attack 2015, where Sakuraba teamed with Yano as part of his rivalry with Tanahashi to take on Tanahashi and Shibata. The match ended with Sakuraba submitting his former protégé, who afterwards declared a war on his former mentor. On May 7, NJPW announced grudge matches between Tanahashi and Yano as well as Sakuraba and Shibata for Dominion 7.5 in Osaka-jo Hall.

Following the conclusion of the 2015 Best of the Super Juniors, NJPW announced a sixth title match for the event, where The Young Bucks (Matt Jackson and Nick Jackson) would defend their IWGP Junior Heavyweight Tag Team Championship in a three-way match against reDRagon (Bobby Fish and Kyle O'Reilly) and Roppongi Vice (Beretta and Rocky Romero). During the Best of the Super Juniors, Beretta and O'Reilly wrestled in the A block, while Fish, Romero and Nick Jackson wrestled in block B. In the head-to-head matches between members of the three teams, Fish and O'Reilly won all three of their matches and Romero defeated Jackson.

== Event ==
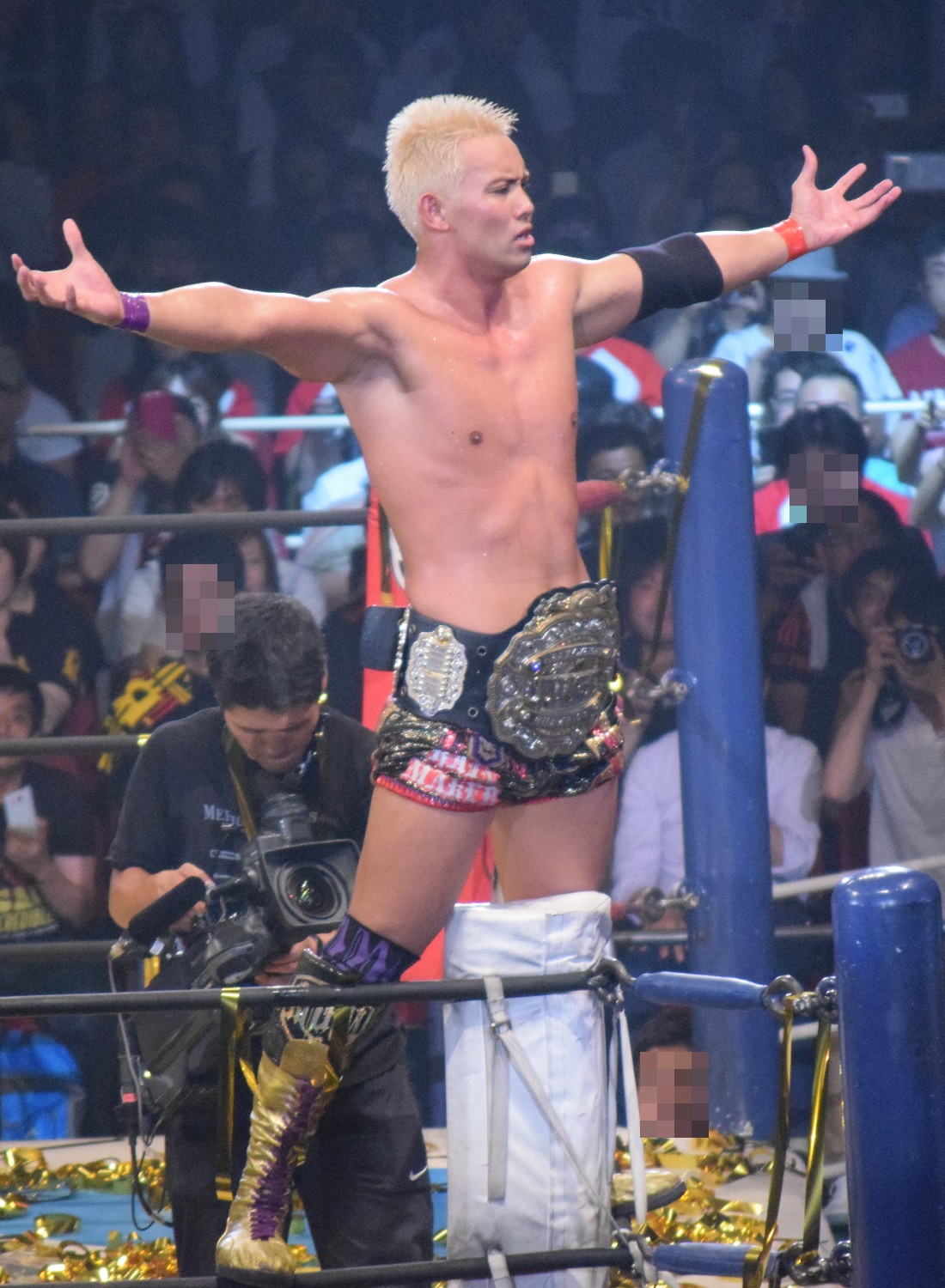
Kazuchika Okada celebrating at Dominion 7.5 in Osaka-jo Hall, after capturing the IWGP Heavyweight Championship

In the first match of Dominion 7.5 in Osaka-jo Hall, The Young Bucks made their first successful defense of the IWGP Junior Heavyweight Tag Team Championship, defeating reDRagon and Roppongi Vice in a three-way match. The third match featured former mixed martial artists Katsuyori Shibata and Kazushi Sakuraba facing off in a grudge match, where Shibata was victorious. The next match saw the 2015 Best of the Super Juniors winner Kushida submit Kenny Omega to win the IWGP Junior Heavyweight Championship for the second time. Omega's six-month reign ended at his fourth title defense. Next up was the third NEVER Openweight Championship match between Togi Makabe and Tomohiro Ishii in six months. Early in the match, Ishii went for a plancha, but landed on a shoulder he had separated the previous year, when Makabe failed to catch him properly. This led to a doctor coming ringside to check on Ishii, nearly stopping the match early. In the end, just like in the previous two matches, Makabe was again victorious, making his first successful title defense. In the fourth title match of the event, The Kingdom's Matt Taven and Michael Bennett defended the IWGP Tag Team Championship against Bullet Club's Doc Gallows and Karl Anderson. The match featured outside interference from both Amber Gallows and Maria Kanellis. Anderson's infatuation with Kanellis continued distracting him from the match, eventually leading to Doc Gallows superkicking Kanellis, removing her from the match. Shortly thereafter, Anderson and Gallows isolated Taven and hit him with the Magic Killer to win the IWGP Tag Team Championship for the third time as a team, ending The Kingdom's reign at their first defense.

The next match saw Hiroshi Tanahashi take on Toru Yano's in a grudge match. Tanahashi survived Yano's attempts to cheat his way to another victory and in the end defeated him to win their rivalry. In the semi-main event, Hirooki Goto defeated Shinsuke Nakamura to make his first successful defense of the IWGP Intercontinental Championship. The main event featured A.J. Styles defending the IWGP Heavyweight Championship against Kazuchika Okada. Early part of the match featured outside interference from Styles' Bullet Club stablemates, leading to referee Red Shoes Unno ejecting them from ringside, leaving Styles alone. Eventually, after a series of counters, Okada hit Styles with his Rainmaker finishing move to win the match and become the new IWGP Heavyweight Champion. Okada started his third reign, while Styles' second reign ended at his second defense.

== Reception ==
Dave Meltzer of the Wrestling Observer Newsletter called the event "fantastic". He praised both Okada and Styles, calling them "two of the three best wrestlers in the world beyond the top of their game", writing that their match against each other was in a "completely different league" from all other "great" matches that had taken place earlier in the show and at WWE's The Beast in the East show the previous day. Meltzer also praised the IWGP Intercontinental and IWGP Junior Heavyweight Championship matches, dubbing Kushida "one of the best wrestlers in the world today". Meltzer also praised Ishii's selling, though noting he could have been legitimately hurt in the plancha spot, noting that there was a lot of miscommunication and mistimed spots in the match following the incident. He gave the main event four and three quarter stars out of five and the IWGP Intercontinental and Junior Heavyweight Championship matches both four and a half stars.

James Caldwell of Pro Wrestling Torch called the show a "must-watch", giving the main event a full five-star rating, writing that it was "[o]ne of those matches that you just didn't want to see end". Sean Radican of the same site gave the show an overall score of 8.5, stating that it "had its peaks and valleys", though ultimately being "very good". He gave the IWGP Intercontinental Championship match four stars and the main event four and three quarter stars out of five. Radican panned the NEVER Openweight Championship match, giving it one and a quarter stars, stating he was taken out of the match when Makabe "didn't make much of an effort" to catch Ishii in the plancha at the start of the match.

Matthew Macklin of Pro Wrestling Insider called the show "the best NJPW show of the year", stating that it had "four or five matches that could be on any match of the year list".

411Mania's Larry Csonka gave the show a rating of 9.8, stating that it "just [nudged] out Wrestle Kingdom 9 for the show of the year". Csonka named both the IWGP Junior Heavyweight and the IWGP Heavyweight Championship matches match of the year candidates, giving the former four and a half stars and the latter a full five-star rating.

Several reviewers were down on the IWGP Tag Team Championship match and its "Americanized" style of professional wrestling with Csonka naming it the worst match of the event. Meltzer, Macklin and Csonka all noted the Osaka-jō Hall crowd's lack of interest in the match.

== Aftermath ==
Drawing a full capacity crowd of 11,400, the event was dubbed a great success by NJPW owner Takaaki Kidani.

Following Dominion 7.5 in Osaka-jo Hall, NJPW presented its annual premier tournament, G1 Climax, featuring twenty participants. Both Dominion 7.5 main eventers entered their final round-robin matches with a chance to advance to the finals, but A.J. Styles was eliminated after losing to Hiroshi Tanahashi, while Kazuchika Okada was eliminated after losing to his Chaos stablemate Shinsuke Nakamura. Tanahashi went on to defeat Nakamura in the finals to win the tournament. During the final day of the tournament, Styles pinned Okada in a six-man tag team match, setting up an IWGP Heavyweight Championship rematch between the two, which was eventually announced for October's King of Pro-Wrestling.

After winning the IWGP Junior Heavyweight Championship at Dominion 7.5 in Osaka-jo Hall, Kushida went on to defeat Ricochet on August 16 to make his first successful title defense. The same day, reDRagon defeated The Young Bucks to win the IWGP Junior Heavyweight Tag Team Championship for the second time.

== Results ==
| No. | Results | Stipulations | Times |
|---|---|---|---|
| 1^{P} | Manabu Nakanishi, Máscara Dorada, Ryusuke Taguchi, Sho Tanaka and Yuji Nagata defeated Hiroyoshi Tenzan, Jyushin Thunder Liger, Satoshi Kojima, Tiger Mask and Yohei Komatsu | Ten-man tag team match | 08:16 |
| 2 | The Young Bucks (Matt Jackson and Nick Jackson) (c) (with Cody Hall) defeated reDRagon (Bobby Fish and Kyle O'Reilly) and Roppongi Vice (Beretta and Rocky Romero) | Three-way tag team match for the IWGP Junior Heavyweight Tag Team Championship | 14:30 |
| 3 | Tetsuya Naito and Tomoaki Honma defeated Bullet Club (Bad Luck Fale and Yujiro Takahashi) (with Shiori) | Tag team match | 08:50 |
| 4 | Katsuyori Shibata defeated Kazushi Sakuraba | Singles match | 11:48 |
| 5 | Kushida defeated Kenny Omega (c) (with Matt Jackson and Nick Jackson) | Singles match for the IWGP Junior Heavyweight Championship | 20:44 |
| 6 | Togi Makabe (c) defeated Tomohiro Ishii | Singles match for the NEVER Openweight Championship | 17:50 |
| 7 | Bullet Club (Doc Gallows and Karl Anderson) (with Amber Gallows) defeated The Kingdom (Matt Taven and Michael Bennett) (c) (with Maria Kanellis) | Tag team match for the IWGP Tag Team Championship | 10:09 |
| 8 | Hiroshi Tanahashi defeated Toru Yano | Singles match | 12:32 |
| 9 | Hirooki Goto (c) defeated Shinsuke Nakamura | Singles match for the IWGP Intercontinental Championship | 22:40 |
| 10 | Kazuchika Okada (with Gedo) defeated A.J. Styles (c) (with Amber Gallows, Cody Hall, Doc Gallows, Karl Anderson, Matt Jackson, Nick Jackson and Tama Tonga) | Singles match for the IWGP Heavyweight Championship | 26:16 |
(c) / – the champion(s) heading into the match; P / – the match was broadcast on the pre-show
