= Apollo 55 =

Professional wrestling tag team

Tag team
- Members: Prince Devitt; Ryusuke Taguchi
- Name: Apollo 55
- Billed heights: Devitt: 1.80 m (5 ft 11 in); Taguchi: 1.80 m (5 ft 11 in)
- Combined billed weight: 172 kg (379 lb)
- Debut: January 30, 2009
- Disbanded: April 7, 2013
- Years active: 2009–2013

Apollo 55 (アポロ・ゴー・ゴー, Aporo Gō Gō) were a professional wrestling tag team consisting of Prince Devitt and Ryusuke Taguchi. One of the most accomplished junior heavyweight tag teams in New Japan Pro-Wrestling (NJPW) history, the team held the IWGP Junior Heavyweight Tag Team Championship four times and successfully defended it during their second reign record-setting seven times. While members of Apollo 55, Devitt and Taguchi also accomplished several singles achievements with Devitt holding the IWGP Junior Heavyweight Championship three times, while both he and Taguchi won the annual Best of the Super Juniors tournament. After four years of teaming together, the team disbanded in April 2013.

== History ==
=== Formation (2009) ===
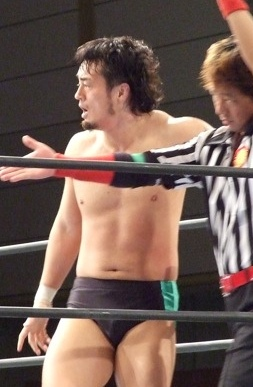
Ryusuke Taguchi

On January 4, 2009, at New Japan Pro-Wrestling's (NJPW) Wrestle Kingdom III in Tokyo Dome, The Motor City Machine Guns (Alex Shelley and Chris Sabin), representatives of American promotion Total Nonstop Action Wrestling (TNA), defeated No Limit (Tetsuya Naito and Yujiro) for the IWGP Junior Heavyweight Tag Team Championship. Following the event, several teams emerged as candidates to bring the title back to NJPW. After two of these teams, No Limit and Unione (Milano Collection A.T. and Taichi), wrestled to a draw on January 30, former IWGP Junior Heavyweight Champion Ryusuke Taguchi entered the ring alongside Irish wrestler Prince Devitt to announce that the two were also entering the race for a shot at the IWGP Junior Heavyweight Tag Team Championship. Devitt's longtime tag team partner Minoru had recently left NJPW, leading to the promotion putting him and Taguchi together because of their similarities in both age and size, despite the fact that neither of them could speak the other's language. On February 15, Devitt and Taguchi failed to earn a shot at the title, when they were defeated in a four-way number one contender's match by No Limit. After No Limit failed to regain the title from The Motor City Machine Guns, NJPW announced that Devitt and Taguchi were next in line for a shot at the title. On April 1, Devitt and Taguchi held a public training session, during which they announced that in the future their tag team would be known as "Apollo 55" (pronounced "Apollo Go Go"), while also presenting their first two double-team finishing maneuvers. Devitt has stated that he came up with the team name, combining his love of sci-fi and space with Taguchi's nickname "Funky Weapon a Go Go" ("Go" also being Japanese for the number five). Apollo 55 received their title shot on April 5, but were defeated by The Motor City Machine Guns.

=== Junior heavyweight tag team domination (2009–2012) ===
On June 20, 2009, at Dominion 6.20, Apollo 55 defeated Unione to earn another shot at the IWGP Junior Heavyweight Tag Team Championship and, on July 5, they defeated The Motor City Machine Guns in a rematch to win the title, bringing it back to NJPW. Apollo 55 made their first successful title defense just fifteen days later against Unione. On September 13, Apollo 55 defeated The Motor City Machine Guns in a rubber match for their second successful title defense. On October 17, Apollo 55 entered the 2009 G1 Tag League, where they made it all the way to the finals on November 1, before losing to the heavyweight tag team of Giant Bernard and Karl Anderson. Before the end of the year, Apollo 55 made another successful defense of the IWGP Junior Heavyweight Tag Team Championship, when they defeated Koji Kanemoto and Nobuo Yoshihashi on December 4. The team started off 2010 with their fourth successful defense, defeating the Consejo Mundial de Lucha Libre (CMLL) tag team of Averno and Último Guerrero on January 4 at Wrestle Kingdom IV in Tokyo Dome. On February 14, Apollo 55 made their fifth successful defense against Dick Togo and Gedo. Afterwards, Devitt was sidelined with an injury, which resulted in Taguchi vacating the IWGP Junior Heavyweight Tag Team Championship on April 21. Devitt was, however, able to make his return for the Super J Tag Tournament 1st, a one-night, eight-team tournament used to determine the new champions. In the tournament, Apollo 55 made it all the way to the finals, before being defeated by El Samurai and Koji Kanemoto. Following the tournament, Devitt began breaking out as a singles wrestler, first winning the 2010 Best of the Super Juniors tournament on June 13 and then defeating Naomichi Marufuji for the IWGP Junior Heavyweight Championship on June 19 at Dominion 6.19. On June 30, Devitt, Taguchi and Hirooki Goto, billed together as "Apollo 555", won the three-night J Sports Crown Openweight 6 Man Tag Tournament. On July 19, Devitt and Taguchi defeated El Samurai and Koji Kanemoto to regain the IWGP Junior Heavyweight Tag Team Championship. However, after only one successful defense, they lost the title to DDT Pro-Wrestling representatives, Golden☆Lovers (Kenny Omega and Kota Ibushi), on October 11 at Destruction '10. Apollo 55 received a rematch for the title on November 14 at a DDT event, but were again defeated by the Golden☆Lovers.

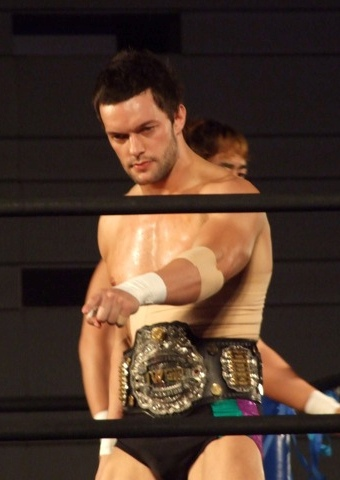
Prince Devitt

After Devitt successfully defended the IWGP Junior Heavyweight Championship against Ibushi on January 4, 2011, at Wrestle Kingdom V in Tokyo Dome, he and Taguchi were granted another shot at the IWGP Junior Heavyweight Tag Team Championship and, on January 23 during the Fantastica Mania 2011 weekend, defeated the Golden☆Lovers to win the title for the third time. During the next nine months, Apollo 55 successfully defended the title seven times, setting a new NJPW record. During the reign they also made successful defenses in the Kaientai Dojo promotion against Little☆Galaxy (Makoto Oishi and Shiori Asahi) and in the United States, during NJPW's Invasion Tour, against the Strong Style Thugz (Homicide and Low Ki). On June 23, Apollo 555 also won the second J Sports Crown Openweight 6 Man Tag Tournament. After a reign of 260 days, Apollo 55 lost the IWGP Junior Heavyweight Tag Team Championship to the No Remorse Corps (Davey Richards and Rocky Romero) in their eighth title defense on October 10, 2011, at Destruction '11. In December, Devitt made successful defenses of the IWGP Junior Heavyweight Championship against both Richards and Romero, which resulted in another IWGP Junior Heavyweight Tag Team Championship match on January 4, 2012, at Wrestle Kingdom VI in Tokyo Dome, where Apollo 55 defeated the No Remorse Corps to win the title for the fourth time, meaning that they now shared the record for most reigns as a team with Jado & Gedo (a record which has since been broken by The Young Bucks). However, just a month later on February 12 at The New Beginning, Apollo 55 lost the title back to the No Remorse Corps in their first defense. Devitt and Taguchi continued teaming together throughout 2012, though both were also involved in the IWGP Junior Heavyweight Championship picture with Taguchi most notably winning the 2012 Best of the Super Juniors. On November 2, Apollo 55 made it to the finals of the 2012 Super Jr. Tag Tournament, before losing to the Time Splitters (Alex Shelley and Kushida).

=== Dissolution and aftermath (2013–2014) ===
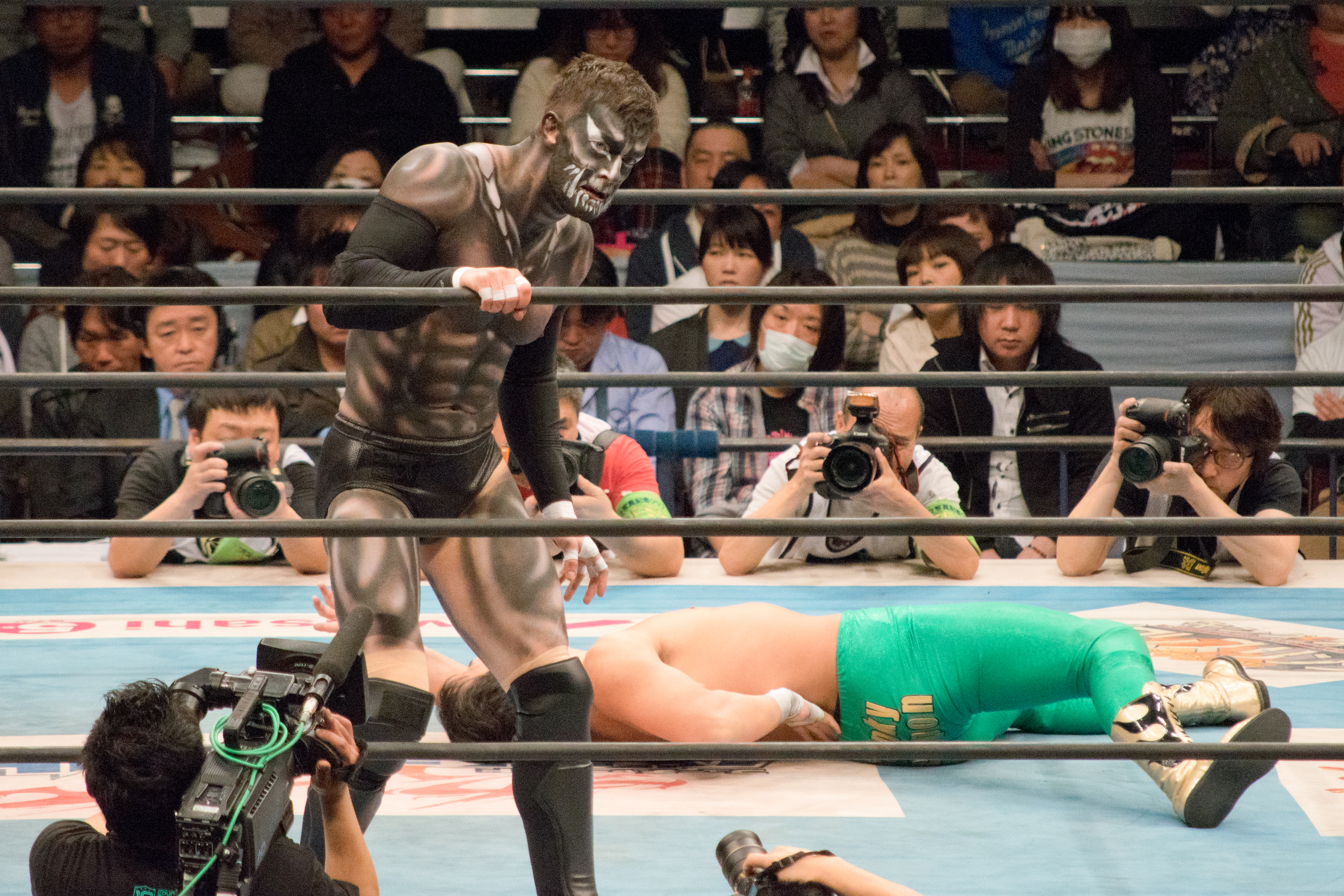
Prince Devitt and Ryusuke Taguchi during their final match against each other at Invasion Attack 2014

On January 4, 2013, at Wrestle Kingdom 7 in Tokyo Dome, after Devitt had successfully defended the IWGP Junior Heavyweight Championship in a three-way match against Low Ki and Kota Ibushi, Taguchi entered the ring to formally challenge his tag team partner to a future title match, which Devitt accepted. The title match between the two Apollo 55 members took place on February 10 at The New Beginning and saw Devitt retain his title. Shortly afterwards, after losing a high-profile non-title main event against IWGP Heavyweight Champion Hiroshi Tanahashi on March 3, Devitt began portraying a more cocky and villainous persona, regularly disrespecting both partners and opponents, with the exception of Taguchi, whom he tried to get to go along with his new attitude. On April 7 at Invasion Attack, Apollo 55 unsuccessfully challenged the Time Splitters for the IWGP Junior Heavyweight Tag Team Championship. Post-match, Devitt attacked Taguchi with help from Bad Luck Fale, signaling the end of one of the most accomplished junior heavyweight tag teams in NJPW history.

Following the dissolution of Apollo 55, Prince Devitt formed the villainous Bullet Club stable with Fale, Karl Anderson and Tama Tonga, while also beginning to move out of the junior heavyweight division and even challenging for the IWGP Heavyweight Championship. Despite this transition, Devitt kept holding the IWGP Junior Heavyweight Championship, though the title was largely pushed aside and forgotten. He ended up holding the title until January 2014, when he lost it to Kota Ibushi. Meanwhile, Taguchi suffered a hip injury shortly after the breakup of Apollo 55, but returned in February 2014, restarting his rivalry with Devitt. On April 6 at Invasion Attack 2014, one year after the dissolution of Apollo 55, Taguchi defeated Devitt in a grudge match between the two, after which they shook hands with each other. The following day, NJPW announced Devitt's resignation from the promotion.

== Championships and accomplishments ==
- Consejo Mundial de Lucha Libre
  - CMLL World Welterweight Championship (1 time) – Taguchi
  - NWA World Historic Middleweight Championship (1 time) – Devitt
- Kaientai Dojo
  - Best Tag Match Award (2011) vs. Makoto Oishi and Shiori Asahi on April 17
- New Japan Pro-Wrestling
  - IWGP Junior Heavyweight Championship (3 times) – Devitt
  - IWGP Junior Heavyweight Tag Team Championship (4 times)
  - Best of the Super Juniors (2010) – Devitt
  - Best of the Super Juniors (2012) – Taguchi
  - J Sports Crown Openweight 6 Man Tag Tournament (2010, 2011) – with Hirooki Goto
- Revolution Pro Wrestling
  - British Cruiserweight Championship (1 time) – Devitt
- Tokyo Sports
  - Best Bout Award (2010) vs. Kenny Omega and Kota Ibushi on October 11

== See also ==
- New Japan Pro-Wrestling
- Puroresu
