= Dominion 6.20 =

2009 New Japan Pro-Wrestling pay-per-view event

- The controversial promotional poster for the event, featuring Hiroshi Tanahashi, Hirooki Goto, Yuji Nagata, Shinsuke Nakamura and Togi Makabe surrounded by a swastika, SS bolts and a German eagle
- Promotion: New Japan Pro-Wrestling
- Date: June 20, 2009
- City: Osaka, Japan
- Venue: Osaka Prefectural Gymnasium
- Attendance: 5,800

Pay-per-view chronology
← Previous; Wrestling Dontaku	Next → G1 Climax 2009

Dominion chronology
← Previous; First	Next → 6.19

New Japan Pro-Wrestling events chronology
← Previous; Wrestling Dontaku 2009	Next → Destruction '09

Dominion 6.20 was a professional wrestling pay-per-view (PPV) event promoted by New Japan Pro-Wrestling (NJPW). The event took place on June 20, 2009, in Osaka, Osaka Prefecture, at the Osaka Prefectural Gymnasium.

The event featured ten matches, two of which were contested for championships. Go Shiozaki and Takashi Sugiura from Pro Wrestling Noah took part in the event as outsiders. It was the first event under the Dominion name. The original promotional poster for the event created some controversy due to the usage of Nazi symbols.

== Storylines ==
Dominion 6.20 featured ten professional wrestling matches that involved different wrestlers from pre-existing scripted feuds and storylines. Wrestlers portrayed villains, heroes, or less distinguishable characters in the scripted events that built tension and culminated in a wrestling match or series of matches.

== Event ==
The event marked the culmination of a storyline rivalry between the fifth Black Tiger and the fourth Tiger Mask in a Mask vs. Mask match, where Tiger Mask was victorious. Post-match, Black Tiger was prevented from escaping by Koji Kanemoto, the former third Tiger Mask, and then unmasked by Tiger Mask, revealing veteran wrestler Tatsuhito Takaiwa. American promotion Total Nonstop Action Wrestling (TNA) representatives Team 3D (Brother Devon and Brother Ray) returned to NJPW at the event to successfully defend the IWGP Tag Team Championship against Giant Bernard and Karl Anderson. In the main event, Hiroshi Tanahashi recaptured the IWGP Heavyweight Championship from Manabu Nakanishi and was afterwards challenged by Takashi Sugiura, setting up his first title defense.

== Results ==
No.	Results	Stipulations	Times
1	Legend (Akira and Jyushin Thunder Liger) defeated Koji Kanemoto and Nobuo Yoshihashi	Tag team match	06:47
2	Takao Omori and Yutaka Yoshie defeated Mitsuhide Hirasawa and Super Strong Machine	Tag team match	05:26
3	Apollo 55 (Prince Devitt and Ryusuke Taguchi) defeated Unione (Milano Collection A.T. and Taichi)	Tag team match to determine the number one contender to the IWGP Junior Heavyweight Tag Team Championship	13:13
4	Tiger Mask defeated Black Tiger	Mask vs. Mask match	04:32
5	Chaos (Jado, Shinsuke Nakamura, Takashi Iizuka and Tomohiro Ishii) defeated Hiroyoshi Tenzan, Tomoaki Honma, Wataru Inoue and Yuji Nagata	Eight-man tag team match	12:12
6	Go Shiozaki defeated Kazuchika Okada	Singles match	08:28
7	Team 3D (Brother Devon and Brother Ray) (c) defeated Chaos (Giant Bernard and Karl Anderson)	Hardcore tag team match for the IWGP Tag Team Championship	18:04
8	Takashi Sugiura defeated Hirooki Goto	Singles match	14:42
9	Toru Yano defeated Togi Makabe	Singles match	14:16
10	Hiroshi Tanahashi defeated Manabu Nakanishi (c)	Singles match for the IWGP Heavyweight Championship	31:18
(c) / – the champion(s) heading into the match
