= Dominion 6.22 =

- Promotional poster for the event, featuring Kazuchika Okada, Togi Makabe, Shinsuke Nakamura and Hiroshi Tanahashi
- Promotion: New Japan Pro-Wrestling
- Date: June 22, 2013
- City: Osaka, Japan
- Venue: Bodymaker Colosseum
- Attendance: 7,240

Pay-per-view chronology
← Previous; Wrestling Dontaku	Next → Kizuna Road

Dominion chronology
← Previous; 6.16	Next → 6.21

New Japan Pro-Wrestling events chronology
← Previous; Wrestling Dontaku 2013	Next → Destruction

Dominion 6.22 was a professional wrestling pay-per-view (PPV) event promoted by New Japan Pro-Wrestling (NJPW). The event took place on June 22, 2013, in Osaka, Osaka, at the Bodymaker Colosseum. The event featured ten matches (including one dark match), four of which were contested for championships. It was the fifth event under the Dominion name.

== Storylines ==
Dominion 6.22 featured ten professional wrestling matches that involved different wrestlers from pre-existing scripted feuds and storylines. Wrestlers portrayed villains, heroes, or less distinguishable characters in the scripted events that built tension and culminated in a wrestling match or series of matches.

== Event ==
The event featured a special three-way tag team match, where IWGP Tag Team Champions Tencozy (Hiroyoshi Tenzan and Satoshi Kojima) faced GHC Tag Team Champions Takashi Iizuka and Toru Yano and NWA World Tag Team Champions K.E.S. (Davey Boy Smith Jr. and Lance Archer), though only the IWGP title was on the line. As part of the newly revived relationship between NJPW and the National Wrestling Alliance (NWA), the event featured the second time Rob Conway defended the NWA World Heavyweight Championship in a NJPW ring. During the event, Tetsuya Naito wrestled his first match since King of Pro-Wrestling in October 2012, defeating former No Limit partner Yujiro Takahashi, who in storyline had caused his knee injury. In the semi-main event, Prince Devitt defeated rival Hiroshi Tanahashi to earn his first shot at the IWGP Heavyweight Championship, held by Kazuchika Okada, who retained the title against Togi Makabe in the main event. Following his win, Okada accepted Devitt's challenge on the condition that he first defend his IWGP Junior Heavyweight Championship against Okada's manager Gedo.

== Results ==
No.	Results	Stipulations	Times
1^{D}	Suzuki-gun (Taichi and Taka Michinoku) defeated Jyushin Thunder Liger and Tiger Mask	Tag team match	07:09
2	Forever Hooligans (Alex Koslov and Rocky Romero) (c) defeated Time Splitters (Alex Shelley and Kushida)	Tag team match for the IWGP Junior Heavyweight Tag Team Championship	13:09
3	Bullet Club (Bad Luck Fale, Karl Anderson and Tama Tonga) defeated Captain New Japan, Tomoaki Honma and Yuji Nagata	Six-man tag team match	08:19
4	Tencozy (Hiroyoshi Tenzan and Satoshi Kojima) (c) defeated Chaos (Takashi Iizuka and Toru Yano) and K.E.S. (Davey Boy Smith Jr. and Lance Archer)	Three-way tag team match for the IWGP Tag Team Championship	11:50
5	Rob Conway (c) (with Bruce Tharpe) defeated Manabu Nakanishi	Singles match for the NWA World Heavyweight Championship	08:32
6	Suzuki-gun (Minoru Suzuki and Shelton X Benjamin) (with Taichi) defeated Chaos (Shinsuke Nakamura and Tomohiro Ishii)	Tag team match	12:36
7	Tetsuya Naito defeated Yujiro Takahashi (with Ami Kasai and Ririsu Ayaka)	Singles match	15:01
8	Katsuyori Shibata defeated Hirooki Goto	Singles match	13:16
9	Prince Devitt (with Bad Luck Fale, Karl Anderson and Tama Tonga) defeated Hiroshi Tanahashi	Singles match to determine the number one contender to the IWGP Heavyweight Championship	15:33
10	Kazuchika Okada (c) (with Gedo) defeated Togi Makabe	Singles match for the IWGP Heavyweight Championship	25:04
(c) / – the champion(s) heading into the match; D / – this was a dark match
