= Dominion 6.11 in Osaka-jo Hall =

2017 New Japan Pro-Wrestling event

- Promotional poster for the event, featuring various NJPW wrestlers
- Promotion: New Japan Pro-Wrestling
- Date: June 11, 2017
- City: Osaka, Japan
- Venue: Osaka-jō Hall
- Attendance: 11,756

Event chronology
← Previous; Road to Dominion; War of the Worlds	Next → Lion's Gate Project 6; G1 Special in USA

Dominion chronology
← Previous; 6.19	Next → 6.9

Dominion 6.11 in Osaka-jo Hall was a professional wrestling event promoted by New Japan Pro-Wrestling (NJPW). The event took place on June 11, 2017, in Osaka, Osaka, at the Osaka-jō Hall and was the ninth event under the Dominion name and third in a row to take place at the Osaka-jō Hall.

The event was NJPW's biggest between January's Wrestle Kingdom 11 in Tokyo Dome and July–August's G1 Climax and three of its four top matches were rematches from the January show; Hiromu Takahashi defended the IWGP Junior Heavyweight Championship against the 2017 Best of the Super Juniors winner Kushida, Tetsuya Naito defended the IWGP Intercontinental Championship against Hiroshi Tanahashi and in the main event Kazuchika Okada defended the IWGP Heavyweight Championship against Kenny Omega. The NEVER Openweight Championship, NEVER Openweight 6-Man Tag Team Championship, IWGP Tag Team Championship and IWGP Junior Heavyweight Tag Team Championship were also defended as part of the ten-match card.

== Production ==
=== Background ===
Dominion 6.11 in Osaka-jo Hall was officially announced on January 4, 2017, during Wrestle Kingdom 11 in Tokyo Dome. The event was NJPW's biggest between Wrestle Kingdom 11 and July–August's G1 Climax. The event aired through NJPW's internet streaming site, NJPW World, and featured English commentary. The main event of the show, along with two other matches, would air on AXS TV on June 30, the day before the live G1 Special in USA show.

=== Storylines ===
Dominion 6.11 in Osaka-jo Hall featured ten professional wrestling matches that involved different wrestlers from pre-existing scripted feuds and storylines. Wrestlers portrayed villains, heroes, or less distinguishable characters in the scripted events that built tension and culminated in a wrestling match or series of matches.

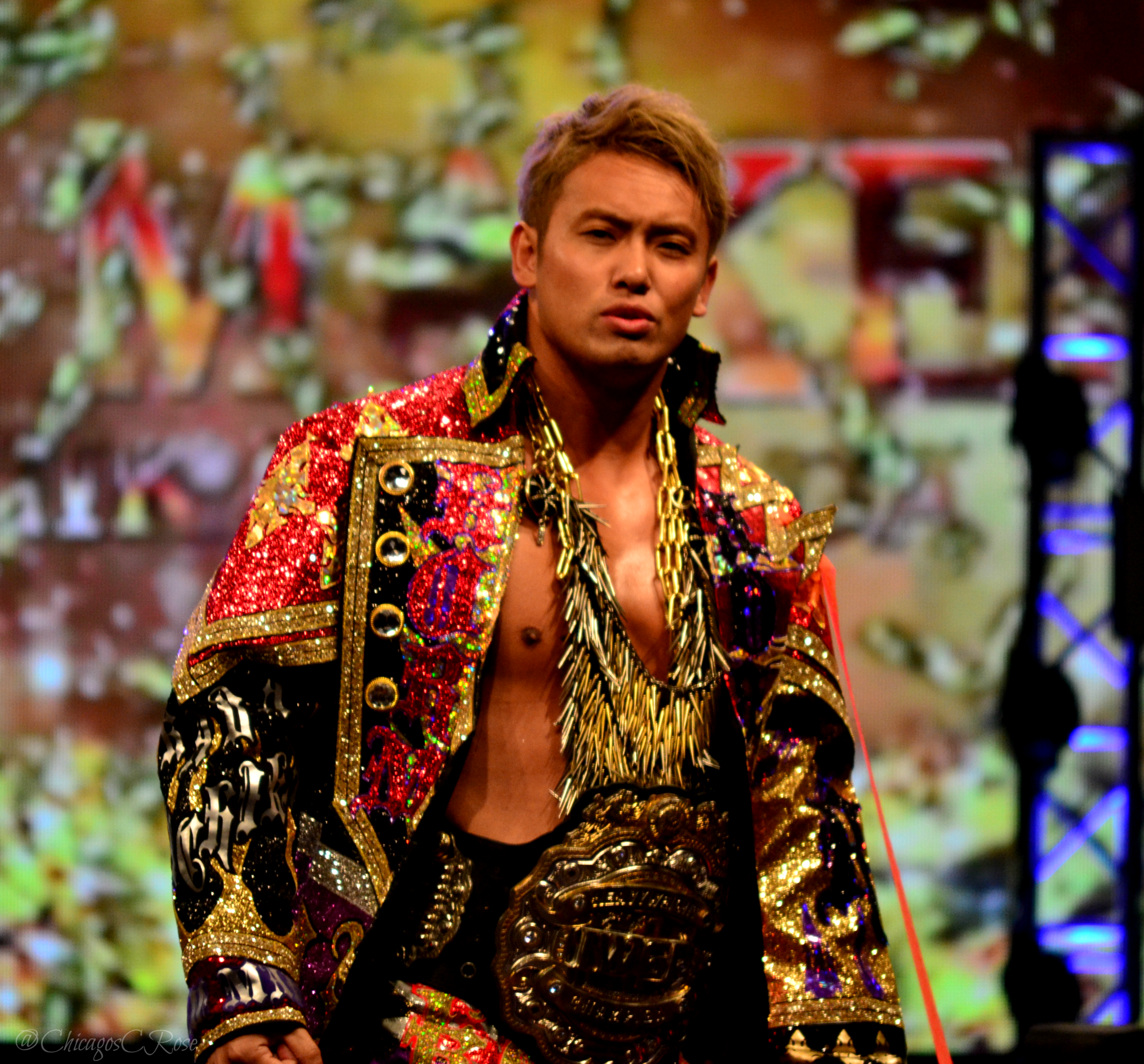
Kazuchika Okada, who made his sixth defense of the IWGP Heavyweight Championship in the main event

Dominion 6.11 in Osaka-jo Hall was main evented by Kazuchika Okada making his sixth defense of the IWGP Heavyweight Championship against Kenny Omega. This would be a rematch from Wrestle Kingdom 11 in Tokyo Dome, where Okada successfully defended the title against Omega in a match that earned critical acclaim, including a six-star rating (on a scale of zero to five) from Dave Meltzer of the Wrestling Observer Newsletter. Following Wrestle Kingdom 11, Omega took a hiatus from NJPW to "reassess [his] future", stating he was "weighing all options". Despite interest from WWE, Omega eventually decided to remain with NJPW and returned to the promotion in late February. Upon his return, Omega set himself a deadline to claim the IWGP Heavyweight Championship, planning to be the champion when NJPW presents the G1 Special in USA shows in Long Beach, California on July 1 and 2, 2017. His quickest way to another title shot was through the 2017 New Japan Cup, but his plan was derailed by Tomohiro Ishii, who eliminated him from the tournament in the first round. Meanwhile, Okada continued defending the IWGP Heavyweight Championship, defeating Minoru Suzuki and New Japan Cup winner Katsuyori Shibata. On May 3 at Wrestling Dontaku 2017, Omega avenged his loss from the New Japan Cup by defeating Tomohiro Ishii and following the main event of the show, where Okada successfully defended the IWGP Heavyweight Championship against Omega's Bullet Club stablemate Bad Luck Fale, he was nominated by the champion as his next challenger at Dominion 6.11 in Osaka-jo Hall. Okada stated that he decided to nominate Omega due to wanting to face the strongest possible challenger. The match was officially announced two days later. In an out-of-character interview, Omega stated that he thought that it was "too soon to revisit [the match]", but recognized that "there comes a time in business when it's just important to move numbers, put asses in seats, as the saying goes, and you have to come out guns blazing".

Dominion 6.11 in Osaka-jo Hall would also feature another rematch from Wrestle Kingdom 11 in Tokyo Dome, with Tetsuya Naito defending the IWGP Intercontinental Championship against Hiroshi Tanahashi. After successfully defending the title against Juice Robinson on April 29, Naito was challenged by Tanahashi, who had defeated his Los Ingobernables de Japón stablemate Evil earlier that same day. Naito, however, tried to turn down Tanahashi's challenge, noting that he and Evil were only tied 1–1 in their series against each other. Tanahashi had lost to Naito at Wrestle Kingdom 11, but was compelled to challenge him to a rematch due to disliking how Naito was treating the championship belt, throwing and kicking it around. Others like Jyushin Thunder Liger had also voiced their displeasure over Naito's actions. The match was officially announced on May 5. On May 18, NJPW announced that Tanahashi had ruptured his right biceps tendon during a recent tour of North America, but stated that he was scheduled to return to the ring in time for Dominion 6.11. In the weeks leading to Dominion 6.11 in Osaka-jo Hall, Naito criticized NJPW's decision to introduce the IWGP United States Heavyweight Championship, stating that it had the same concept as the Intercontinental Championship. Feeling that the Intercontinental Championship was now worth less than a ¥10 coin, Naito stated that if he won at Dominion, he wanted the title retired and if NJPW didn't accept it, he would vacate the title. Tanahashi appeared at NJPW's June 3 show, stating that he was going to be ready by Dominion, while adding that he was going to save the IWGP Intercontinental Championship from Naito.

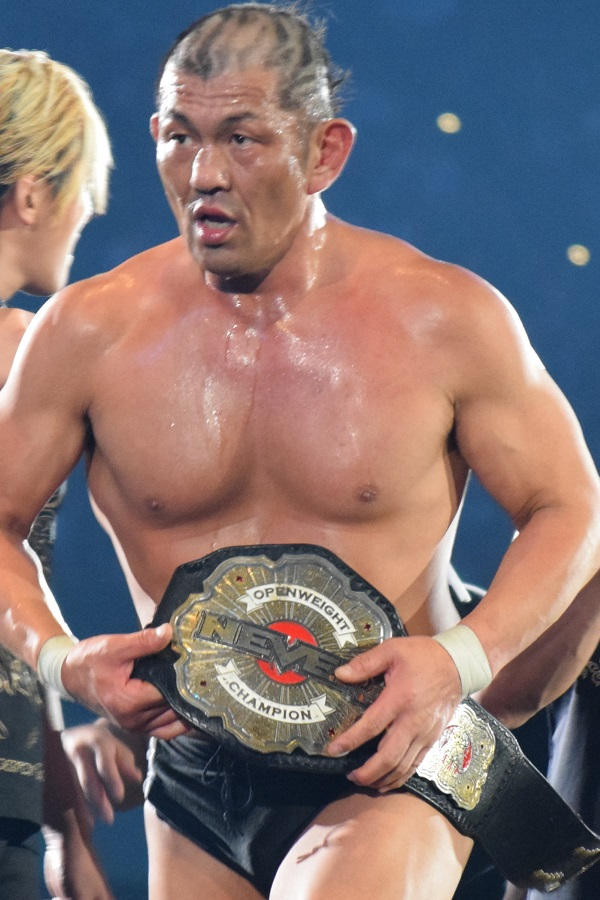
Minoru Suzuki, who defended the NEVER Openweight Championship in a lumberjack deathmatch at the event

The NEVER Openweight Championship would also be defended at Dominion 6.11 in Osaka-jo Hall with champion Minoru Suzuki taking on challenger Hirooki Goto. Suzuki won the title from Goto on April 27 with help from El Desperado, a member of his Suzuki-gun stable. Afterwards, Goto repeatedly requested a rematch with Suzuki. On May 3, Suzuki called out Goto and his entire Chaos stable, declaring war between his and Goto's stables. On May 8, NJPW announced the rematch between Suzuki and Goto, adding that the match would be contested under lumberjack deathmatch rules, where the ring would be surrounded by members of Chaos and Suzuki-gun.

On May 8, NJPW also announced matches for both of the promotion's tag team championships for Dominion 6.11 in Osaka-jo Hall. In the IWGP Tag Team Championship match, War Machine (Hanson and Raymond Rowe) were set to face Guerrillas of Destiny (Tama Tonga and Tanga Loa). War Machine made their first title defense on May 3 in a three-way match, involving Tencozy (Hiroyoshi Tenzan and Satoshi Kojima) and Guerrillas of Destiny. After pinning Tenzan to retain the title, War Machine was attacked from behind by Guerrillas of Destiny, which led to the champions challenging Tonga and Loa to confront them face-to-face. In the IWGP Junior Heavyweight Tag Team Championship match, Roppongi Vice (Beretta and Rocky Romero) would defend against The Young Bucks (Matt Jackson and Nick Jackson). The match was made as a result of a challenge made by Romero after he and Beretta captured the title from Suzuki-gun's Taichi and Yoshinobu Kanemaru on April 27.

Dominion 6.11 in Osaka-jo Hall would also feature a match between Cody and Michael Elgin. After debuting for NJPW on January 4, 2017, Cody has picked up singles match wins over Juice Robinson and David Finlay. After defeating Finlay on May 3, Cody challenged NJPW to find him a stronger opponent, which led to the promotion announcing on May 8 that he would face Elgin at Dominion 6.11. Both Elgin and The Young Bucks make their NJPW returns, after being sidelined earlier in the year due to the size of the promotion's roster.

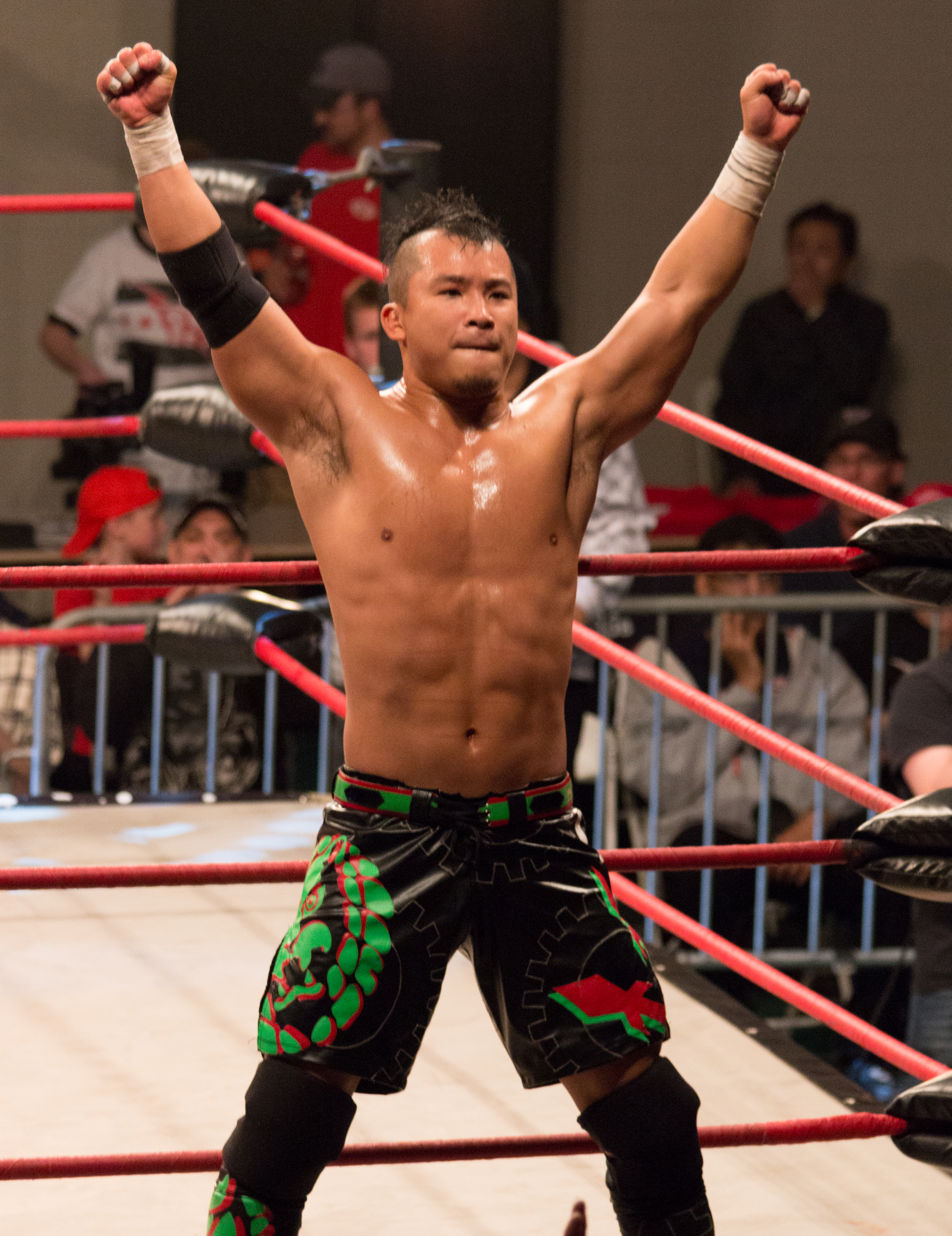
Kushida, the winner of the 2017 Best of the Super Juniors and number one contender to the IWGP Junior Heavyweight Championship

On June 3, Kushida defeated Will Ospreay in the finals to win the 2017 Best of the Super Juniors (BOSJ) tournament, his second BOSJ win in three years. Afterwards, Kushida, while acknowledging that BOSJ is not technically a tournament for the number one contendership, stated that he wanted to face Hiromu Takahashi for the IWGP Junior Heavyweight Championship. Kushida had been NJPW's top junior heavyweight wrestler until the emergence of Takahashi in 2017. After losing the IWGP Junior Heavyweight Championship to Takahashi on January 4 at Wrestle Kingdom 11, Kushida received a rematch for the title on April 9 at Sakura Genesis 2017, but suffered a "humiliating" loss by being defeated in just 116 seconds. Kushida started his resurgence in May by capturing the Ring of Honor (ROH) World Television Championship during NJPW's North American tour and his confidence was boosted during the BOSJ, when he met WWE's William Regal, who praised his 2015 Best of the Super Juniors final match with Kyle O'Reilly. After completing his comeback by winning the BOSJ, Kushida again set his sights on Takahashi, promising to avenge his previous losses. Prior to the BOSJ final, Takahashi stated that he had chosen Ospreay, who had eliminated him from the tournament, as his challenger at Dominion 6.11. Despite this, NJPW elected to make Kushida the number one contender, officially announcing the match between him and Takahashi for Dominion 6.11 on June 5. Takahashi left the press conference where the match was announced in tears, after failing to overturn the decision.

On June 5, NJPW also announced that the NEVER Openweight 6-Man Tag Team Championship would be defended at Dominion 6.11 in Osaka-jo Hall in a five-team gauntlet match with defending champions Los Ingobernables de Japón members Bushi, Evil and Sanada taking on Bullet Club's Bad Luck Fale, Hangman Page and Yujiro Takahashi, Chaos' Tomohiro Ishii, Toru Yano and Yoshi-Hashi, Suzuki-gun's Taichi, Yoshinobu Kanemaru and Zack Sabre Jr. and Taguchi Japan's Juice Robinson, Ricochet and Ryusuke Taguchi. This marked the second NEVER Openweight 6-Man Tag Team Championship gauntlet match of 2017; the previous took place at Wrestle Kingdom 11 in Tokyo Dome and was won by the Los Ingobernables de Japón trio.

== Reception ==
Dave Meltzer of the Wrestling Observer Newsletter wrote that Dominion 6.11 was "from a match quality standpoint, one of the best shows in company history", offering particular praise to the main event, stating that Okada and Omega "followed one of the greatest pro wrestling matches of all-time, with an even better sequel", awarding it a rating of six and a quarter stars. Comparing the main event to Okada and Omega's first match at Wrestle Kingdom 11 as well as a 1994 match between Mitsuharu Misawa and Toshiaki Kawada, two matches he previously thought were the best matches he had seen, Meltzer concluded that the Dominion 6.11 match was better than either of them, featuring better selling, more drama and a better story. Meltzer wrote that the Dominion 6.11 main event featured "the two best wrestlers in the world at this point in time, both in the best match of their lives" and went on to compare the program between Okada and Omega to the 1989 series of matches between Ric Flair and Ricky Steamboat.

Meltzer also praised several other matches on the card, awarding the IWGP Intercontinental Championship match four and a half stars, the IWGP Junior Heavyweight Championship match four and three quarter stars and the IWGP Junior Heavyweight Tag Team Championship match four stars.

Matthew Macklin of Pro Wrestling Insider called the main event "one of the best pro wrestling matches ever" and the event "one of the best top to bottom pro wrestling shows ever". Pro Wrestling Torch's Sean Radican called the main event "the best match [he had] ever seen".

Mike Campbell of westernlariat.com, rated the main event three and three-quarters stars. He commented that Okada and Omega had an amazing forty-five-minute-long match, but that they didn't have enough in the tank to go for a full hour. He also ranked it #3 on his list of top ten matches he'd reviewed during the year 2017.

== Aftermath ==
In August, the 2017 G1 Climax tournament culminated in rematches from the top two matches from Dominion 6.11. On August 11, Tetsuya Naito defeated Hiroshi Tanahashi to win block A and advance to the finals of the tournament. The following day, Kenny Omega defeated Kazuchika Okada in their third match against each other to win block B and claim the other spot in the finals. On August 13, Naito defeated Omega to win the 2017 G1 Climax and earn a contract for an IWGP Heavyweight Championship match at Wrestle Kingdom 12 in Tokyo Dome on January 4, 2018.

== Results ==
No.	Results	Stipulations	Times
1^{P}	David Finlay, Shota Umino and Tomoyuki Oka defeated Hirai Kawato, Katsuya Kitamura and Tetsuhiro Yagi	Six-man tag team match	07:37
2	Tiger Mask, Tiger Mask W, Togi Makabe and Yuji Nagata defeated Hiroyoshi Tenzan, Jyushin Thunder Liger, Manabu Nakanishi and Satoshi Kojima	Eight-man tag team match	07:01
3	Los Ingobernables de Japón (Bushi, Evil and Sanada) (c) defeated Bullet Club (Bad Luck Fale, Hangman Page and Yujiro Takahashi) (with Pieter and Shiori), Chaos (Tomohiro Ishii, Toru Yano and Yoshi-Hashi), Suzuki-gun (Taichi, Yoshinobu Kanemaru and Zack Sabre Jr.) and Taguchi Japan (Juice Robinson, Ricochet and Ryusuke Taguchi)	Gauntlet match for the NEVER Openweight 6-Man Tag Team Championship	18:39
4	The Young Bucks (Matt Jackson and Nick Jackson) defeated Roppongi Vice (Beretta and Rocky Romero) (c)	Tag team match for the IWGP Junior Heavyweight Tag Team Championship	14:14
5	Guerrillas of Destiny (Tama Tonga and Tanga Loa) defeated War Machine (Hanson and Raymond Rowe) (c)	Tag team match for the IWGP Tag Team Championship	10:43
6	Cody defeated Michael Elgin	Singles match	11:53
7	Kushida defeated Hiromu Takahashi (c) by submission	Singles match for the IWGP Junior Heavyweight Championship	19:12
8	Minoru Suzuki (c) (with El Desperado, Taka Michinoku, Yoshinobu Kanemaru and Zack Sabre Jr.) defeated Hirooki Goto (with Jado, Tomohiro Ishii, Toru Yano and Yoshi-Hashi)	Lumberjack deathmatch for the NEVER Openweight Championship	16:00
9	Hiroshi Tanahashi defeated Tetsuya Naito (c) by submission	Singles match for the IWGP Intercontinental Championship	25:56
10	Kazuchika Okada (c) (with Gedo) vs. Kenny Omega (with Matt Jackson and Nick Jackson) ended in a time limit draw	Singles match for the IWGP Heavyweight Championship	1:00:00
(c) / – the champion(s) heading into the match; P / – the match was broadcast on the pre-show

=== Gauntlet match ===
Elimination	Wrestler	Team	Eliminated by	Elimination move	Time	Ref.
1	Yujiro Takahashi	Bullet Club	Toru Yano	Pinned after a 634	06:01	
2	Toru Yano	Chaos	Zack Sabre Jr.	Pinned with a European Clutch	06:44	
3	Taichi	Suzuki-gun	Juice Robinson	Pinned after a Pulp Friction	11:37	
4	Ryusuke Taguchi	Taguchi Japan	Bushi	Pinned after an MX	18:39	
Winners:	Los Ingobernables de Japón (Bushi, Evil and Sanada)					
