= Dominion 6.21 =

2014 New Japan Pro-Wrestling event

- Promotional poster for the event, featuring Hiroshi Tanahashi, Shinsuke Nakamura, Kazuchika Okada, Togi Makabe, Tetsuya Naito and Hirooki Goto
- Promotion: New Japan Pro-Wrestling
- Date: June 21, 2014
- City: Osaka, Japan
- Venue: Bodymaker Colosseum
- Attendance: 7,300

Pay-per-view chronology
← Previous; Best of the Super Jr. XXI	Next → Kizuna Road

Dominion chronology
← Previous; 6.22	Next → 7.5

New Japan Pro-Wrestling events chronology
← Previous; Back to the Yokohama Arena	Next → Destruction in Kobe

Dominion 6.21 was a professional wrestling pay-per-view (PPV) event promoted by New Japan Pro-Wrestling (NJPW). The event took place on June 21, 2014, in Osaka, Osaka, at the Bodymaker Colosseum. The event featured nine matches, five of which were contested for championships. It was the sixth event under the Dominion name.

== Storylines ==
Dominion 6.21 featured nine professional wrestling matches that involved different wrestlers from pre-existing scripted feuds and storylines. Wrestlers portrayed villains, heroes, or less distinguishable characters in the scripted events that built tension and culminated in a wrestling match or series of matches.

== Event ==
In the first title match, Time Splitters (Alex Shelley and Kushida) defeated The Young Bucks (Matt Jackson and Nick Jackson) to win the IWGP Junior Heavyweight Tag Team Championship for the second time. This rematch from February's The New Beginning in Osaka was a result of the first day of the 2014 Best of the Super Juniors, where Shelley and Kushida scored back-to-back wins over Nick and Matt, respectively. In the second title match, Tencozy (Hiroyoshi Tenzan and Satoshi Kojima) made their third successful defense of the NWA World Tag Team Championship against former champions, K.E.S. (Davey Boy Smith Jr. and Lance Archer). The third title match saw Kota Ibushi make his fourth successful defense of the IWGP Junior Heavyweight Championship against the winner of the 2014 Best of the Super Juniors, Dragon Gate representative Ricochet. Post-match, Ibushi was challenged by both Kushida and El Desperado. This led to a title match on July 4 at Kizuna Road 2014, where Kushida defeated Ibushi to become a double champion. Dominion 6.21 also featured a follow-up to Back to the Yokohama Arena, where Takashi Iizuka turned on Toru Yano and jumped to Suzuki-gun. Iizuka teamed with Suzuki-gun leader and Yano's longtime rival Minoru Suzuki to defeat Yano and his new partner Kazushi Sakuraba, who had surprisingly saved Yano from the two on June 8.

The next match continued the storyline rivalry between the Bullet Club and Chaos stables, when IWGP Heavyweight Champion A.J. Styles and Yujiro Takahashi took on Kazuchika Okada and NEVER Openweight Champion Tomohiro Ishii. The match was a result of events that took place at Back to the Yokohama Arena, where Takahashi attacked Ishii and asserted himself the next challenger to his title. Later in the event, Ishii attacked Takahashi, when he was interfering in an IWGP Heavyweight Championship match between Styles and Okada. At Dominion 6.21, Takahashi pinned Ishii for the win, continuing the build-up to a title match between the two, which took place eight days later at Kizuna Road 2014 and saw Takahashi become the new NEVER Openweight Champion. In the semi main event, Bullet Club's Doc Gallows and Karl Anderson made their fifth successful defense of the IWGP Tag Team Championship against Ace to King (Hiroshi Tanahashi and Togi Makabe). The match also marked Makabe's return the ring, after he had suffered a mandibular fracture at Back to the Yokohama Arena, where he and Tanahashi had become the number one contenders. In the main event of the evening, Bullet Club's Bad Luck Fale defeated Chaos' Shinsuke Nakamura to become the new IWGP Intercontinental Champion.

== Results ==
No.	Results	Stipulations	Times
1	Time Splitters (Alex Shelley and Kushida) defeated The Young Bucks (Matt Jackson and Nick Jackson) (c)	Tag team match for the IWGP Junior Heavyweight Tag Team Championship	16:50
2	Tetsuya Naito defeated Tama Tonga	Singles match	08:13
3	Meiyu Tag (Hirooki Goto and Katsuyori Shibata) defeated Tomoaki Honma and Yuji Nagata	Tag team match	11:20
4	Tencozy (Hiroyoshi Tenzan and Satoshi Kojima) (c) defeated K.E.S. (Davey Boy Smith Jr. and Lance Archer) (with Taka Michinoku)	Tag team match for the NWA World Tag Team Championship	15:26
5	Kota Ibushi (c) (with El Desperado) defeated Ricochet (with Masaaki Mochizuki)	Singles match for the IWGP Junior Heavyweight Championship	13:37
6	Suzuki-gun (Minoru Suzuki and Takashi Iizuka) (with Taka Michinoku) defeated Kazushi Sakuraba and Toru Yano	Tag team match	15:13
7	Bullet Club (A.J. Styles and Yujiro Takahashi) defeated Chaos (Kazuchika Okada and Tomohiro Ishii) (with Gedo)	Tag team match	15:53
8	Bullet Club (Doc Gallows and Karl Anderson) (c) defeated Ace to King (Hiroshi Tanahashi and Togi Makabe)	Tag team match for the IWGP Tag Team Championship	14:41
9	Bad Luck Fale (with Tama Tonga) defeated Shinsuke Nakamura (c)	Singles match for the IWGP Intercontinental Championship	17:56
(c) / – the champion(s) heading into the match
