= NJPW Dominion =

New Japan Pro-Wrestling event series

Dominion
- Promotions: New Japan Pro-Wrestling
- First event: Dominion 6.20

Dominion is an annual professional wrestling event promoted by New Japan Pro-Wrestling (NJPW). The event has been held annually since 2009 as a pay-per-view (PPV). From 2013 to 2014, the event also aired outside Japan as an Internet pay-per-view (iPPV). Since 2015, the event has aired worldwide on NJPW's Internet streaming site, NJPW World. Dominion is the first major event following the Best of the Super Juniors tournament and usually includes a match, where the tournament winner challenges for the IWGP Junior Heavyweight Championship, assuming the champion has not won the tournament. In recent years, Dominion has developed into one of NJPW's showcase events and it is considered the biggest event since the January 4 Dome Show. The first six Dominions took place in June. In 2015, the event was moved to July, but was moved back to June the following year. Originally the event was held at Osaka Prefectural Gymnasium (also known as Bodymaker Colosseum) until 2014; since 2015, the event has been held at Osaka-jō Hall. The 2020 event was scheduled to be held on June 14 but was postponed to July 12 to allow the rescheduled New Japan Cup to take place, this is the first time since 2015 that Dominion took place in July.

== Events ==
#	Event	Date	City	Venue	Attendance	Main event	Ref(s)
1	Dominion 6.20	June 20, 2009	Osaka, Japan	Osaka Prefectural Gymnasium	5,800	Manabu Nakanishi (c) vs. Hiroshi Tanahashi for the IWGP Heavyweight Championship	
2	Dominion 6.19	June 19, 2010	Osaka, Japan	Osaka Prefectural Gymnasium	5,500	Togi Makabe (c) vs. Go Shiozaki for the IWGP Heavyweight Championship	
3	Dominion 6.18	June 18, 2011	Osaka, Japan	Osaka Prefectural Gymnasium	6,200	Hiroshi Tanahashi (c) vs. Hirooki Goto for the IWGP Heavyweight Championship	
4	Dominion 6.16	June 16, 2012	Osaka, Japan	Bodymaker Colosseum	6,850	Kazuchika Okada (c) vs. Hiroshi Tanahashi for the IWGP Heavyweight Championship	
5	Dominion 6.22	June 22, 2013	Osaka, Japan	Bodymaker Colosseum	7,240	Kazuchika Okada (c) vs. Togi Makabe for the IWGP Heavyweight Championship	
6	Dominion 6.21	June 21, 2014	Osaka, Japan	Bodymaker Colosseum	7,300	Shinsuke Nakamura (c) vs. Bad Luck Fale for the IWGP Intercontinental Championship	
7	Dominion 7.5 in Osaka-jo Hall	July 5, 2015	Osaka, Japan	Osaka-jō Hall	11,400	A.J. Styles (c) vs. Kazuchika Okada for the IWGP Heavyweight Championship	
8	Dominion 6.19 in Osaka-jo Hall	June 19, 2016	Osaka, Japan	Osaka-jō Hall	9,925	Tetsuya Naito (c) vs. Kazuchika Okada for the IWGP Heavyweight Championship	
9	Dominion 6.11 in Osaka-jo Hall	June 11, 2017	Osaka, Japan	Osaka-jō Hall	11,756	Kazuchika Okada (c) vs. Kenny Omega for the IWGP Heavyweight Championship	
10	Dominion 6.9 in Osaka-jo Hall (2018)	June 9, 2018	Osaka, Japan	Osaka-jō Hall	11,832	Kazuchika Okada (c) vs. Kenny Omega in a no time limit two out of three falls match for the IWGP Heavyweight Championship	
11	Dominion 6.9 in Osaka-jo Hall (2019)	June 9, 2019	Osaka, Japan	Osaka-jō Hall	11,901	Kazuchika Okada (c) vs. Chris Jericho for the IWGP Heavyweight Championship	
12	Dominion 7.12 in Osaka-jo Hall	July 12, 2020	Osaka, Japan	Osaka-jō Hall	3,898 (Note: Due to the COVID-19 pandemic in Japan, the arena was limited to one-third capacity.)	Tetsuya Naito (c) vs. Evil for both the IWGP Heavyweight Championship and the IWGP Intercontinental Championship	
13	Dominion 6.6 in Osaka-jo Hall	June 7, 2021 (Note: Originally scheduled for June 6, the event was postponed by a day to reflect changes to the state of emergency in place in Osaka (due to the COVID-19 pandemic).)	Osaka, Japan	Osaka-jō Hall	3,045	Kazuchika Okada vs. Shingo Takagi for the vacant IWGP World Heavyweight Championship	
14	Dominion 6.12 in Osaka-jo Hall	June 12, 2022	Osaka, Japan	Osaka-jō Hall	6,068	Kazuchika Okada (c) vs. Jay White for the IWGP World Heavyweight Championship	
15	Dominion 6.4 in Osaka-jo Hall	June 4, 2023	Osaka, Japan	Osaka-jō Hall	7,040	Sanada (c) vs. Yota Tsuji for the IWGP World Heavyweight Championship	
16	Dominion 6.9 in Osaka-jo Hall (2024)	June 9, 2024	Osaka, Japan	Osaka-jō Hall	7,254	El Desperado vs. Taiji Ishimori for the Best of the Super Jr. 31 tournament final	
17	Dominion 6.15 in Osaka-jo Hall	June 15, 2025	Osaka, Japan	Osaka-jō Hall	6,525	Hirooki Goto (c) vs. Shingo Takagi for the IWGP World Heavyweight Championship	
18	Dominion 6.14 in Osaka-jo Hall	June 14, 2026	Osaka, Japan	Osaka-jō Hall	6,890	Callum Newman (c) vs. Yota Tsuji for the IWGP Heavyweight Championship	
(c) – refers to the champion(s) heading into the match

== See also ==
- List of New Japan Pro-Wrestling pay-per-view events
