= IWGP Intercontinental Championship =

Professional wrestling championship

- The IWGP Intercontinental Championship belt (2012–2021)

Details
- Promotion: New Japan Pro-Wrestling (NJPW)
- Date established: January 5, 2011
- Date retired: January 6, 2026

Other name
- IWGP World Heavyweight Championship (2021–2026)
Statistics
- First champion: MVP
- Final champion: Yota Tsuji
- Most reigns: Tetsuya Naito (8 reigns)
- Longest reign: Shinsuke Nakamura (313 days)
- Shortest reign: Yota Tsuji (2 days)
- Oldest champion: Minoru Suzuki (49 years, 7 months and 10 days)
- Youngest champion: La Sombra (23 years, 6 months and 28 days)
- Heaviest champion: Bad Luck Fale (140 kg (310 lb))
- Lightest champion: La Sombra (80 kg (180 lb))

The IWGP Intercontinental Championship (IWGPインターコンチネンタル王座, IWGP intākonchinentaru ōza) was a professional wrestling championship owned by the New Japan Pro-Wrestling (NJPW) promotion. "IWGP" is the acronym of NJPW's governing body, the International Wrestling Grand Prix (インターナショナル・レスリング・グラン・プリ, intānashonaru resuringu guran puri). The title was officially announced on January 5, 2011, and the Inaugural Champion MVP was crowned on May 15, 2011, during NJPW's first tour of the United States. On March 4, 2021, the championship was physically retired by NJPW after being unified with the IWGP Heavyweight Championship to form the IWGP World Heavyweight Championship, with the title being officially retired on January 6, 2026 following the IWGP World Championship's reigns being merged back into the IWGP Heavyweight's, those reigns also being retroactively merged with the Intercontinental Championship's history as well. The final champion was Yota Tsuji, who was in his first reign at the time of the title's retirement.

The title formed what was unofficially called the "New Japan Triple Crown" (新日本トリプルクラウン, Shin Nihon Toripuru Kuraun) along with the IWGP Heavyweight Championship and the NEVER Openweight Championship.

== History ==
On October 3, 2010, American promotion Jersey All Pro Wrestling announced that it had reached an agreement with NJPW to co-promote NJPW's first shows in the United States. NJPW officially announced the NJPW Invasion Tour 2011: Attack on East Coast tour on January 4, 2011, with shows taking place on May 13 in Rahway, New Jersey, May 14 in New York City and May 15 in Philadelphia, Pennsylvania. The following day, NJPW added that, during the tour, the promotion would introduce the IWGP Intercontinental Championship, with the inaugural champion to be crowned in a tournament taking place over the three shows.

=== Inaugural championship tournament (2010–2011) ===
Participants for the tournament were announced on April 8, 2011. The list of participants included: former World Wrestling Entertainment performer MVP, who had signed a contract with New Japan in January 2011; Kazuchika Okada, who had been on a learning excursion to American promotion Total Nonstop Action Wrestling (TNA) since February 2010; Hideo Saito, who had been on a similar tour of Puerto Rico's World Wrestling Council since September 2010; former IWGP Tag Team and IWGP Junior Heavyweight Tag Team Champions Tetsuya Naito and Yujiro Takahashi of No Limit; NJPW regulars Tama Tonga and Toru Yano, and; American independent worker Dan Maff, who made his first appearance for NJPW during the tour. On May 6, it was announced that Tonga had suffered an injury which would force him out of the tournament. He was replaced by former TNA and Ring of Honor performer Josh Daniels. On May 15, MVP defeated Yano in the final of the tournament to become the inaugural champion.

Tournament bracket

Round One (May 13)
MVP	Sub
Kazuchika Okada	12:45
Josh Daniels	Pin
Tetsuya Naito	12:28
Dan Maff	Pin
Toru Yano	10:38
Hideo Saito	Pin
Yujiro Takahashi	08:28

Semifinals (May 14)
MVP	Sub
Tetsuya Naito	10:57
Toru Yano	Pin
Yujiro Takahashi	07:47

Final (May 15)
MVP	Sub
Toru Yano	09:27

=== Nakamura and elevation ===
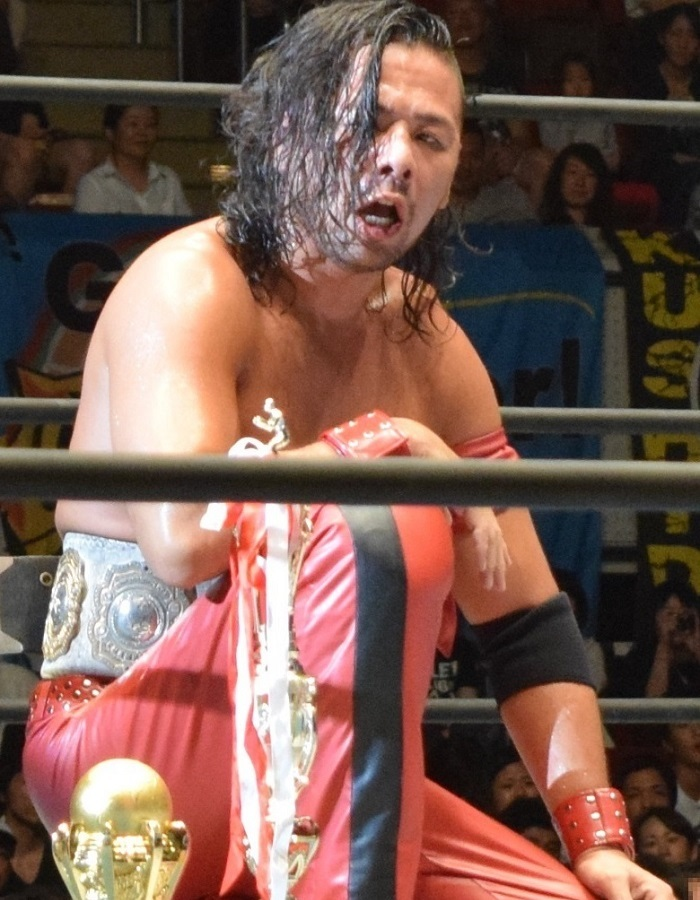
Shinsuke Nakamura is credited with establishing the prestige of the title

Through MVP's inaugural reign and the subsequent reigns of Masato Tanaka and Hirooki Goto, the IWGP Intercontinental Championship was largely a midcard title, remaining firmly behind the IWGP Heavyweight Championship and IWGP Tag Team Championship in importance. However, after Shinsuke Nakamura captured the title from Goto on July 22, 2012, the title began gaining importance. He was already a former three-time IWGP Heavyweight Champion and his first reign lasted 313 days. Nakamura also made the title international again, defending it in both the United States and Mexico. On May 31, 2013, while on tour with Mexican promotion Consejo Mundial de Lucha Libre (CMLL), with whom NJPW has a working relationship, Nakamura lost the title to La Sombra. This marked the first time the title had changed hands outside of NJPW. Nakamura regained the title back in NJPW two months later on July 20, and in the process became the first two-time holder of the title.

Nakamura continued elevating the IWGP Intercontinental Championship, culminating with the IWGP Intercontinental Championship match receiving top billing over the IWGP Heavyweight Championship match at NJPW's biggest annual event, Wrestle Kingdom 8 on January 4, 2014, where former multi-time IWGP Heavyweight Champion Hiroshi Tanahashi became the new champion. Afterwards, Tokyo Sports wrote that the Intercontinental and Heavyweight Championships were now equals, while Dave Meltzer wrote that Nakamura and Tanahashi made the Intercontinental Championship feel like "the real world title belt". Nakamura regained the title from Tanahashi in another main event match on April 6 at Invasion Attack 2014. Nakamura's association with the championship continued to 2016, when he successfully defended it against former IWGP Heavyweight Champion A.J. Styles at Wrestle Kingdom 10. On January 25, 2016, Nakamura was stripped of the title due to his departure from the promotion at the end of the month.

From 2012 to 2016, Nakamura held the IWGP Intercontinental Championship five times and defended it at four consecutive Wrestle Kingdom events. The title was also associated with Nakamura as it was he who personally introduced the new title belt design shortly into his first reign in August 2012. He was outspokenly disapproving of the first belt design—which had bronze plates on a black strap—for its resemblance to a 10 yen coin and saw it as a mockery of the IWGP. The new design featured gold plates on a white strap. The white strap was unprecedented for the IWGP, and symbolized a clean slate for its holder to add to and define.

=== Naito and unification with Heavyweight Championship ===
After Nakamura's departure, the title was most associated with Tetsuya Naito, who held the title for a record eight times. During his first reign, he began systematically destroying the title belt, forcing NJPW to have it repaired in June 2017. Unlike Nakamura, Naito firmly saw the Heavyweight Championship as the top title, and had no desire for the Intercontinental Championship when he first won it. On January 5, 2020, at Wrestle Kingdom 14, Tetsuya Naito won the Heavyweight and Intercontinental Championships. Both titles keep their individual history, but were defended at the same time. Sometimes, they were called "Double Championship". On March 4, 2021, one year after Naito's victory, the titles were unified to form the new IWGP World Heavyweight Championship. The championship would remain functionally retired until January 6, 2026, when the history of the IWGP World Heavyweight Championship would be retroactively inserted into the histories of both the reactivated IWGP Heavyweight Championship and (still retired) IWGP Intercontinental Championship; as a result, along with being recognized as Heavyweight Champions, all previous IWGP World Heavyweight Champions were credited as having been IWGP Intercontential Champions, with Yota Tsuji being recognized as the 41st and final champion.

== Reigns ==
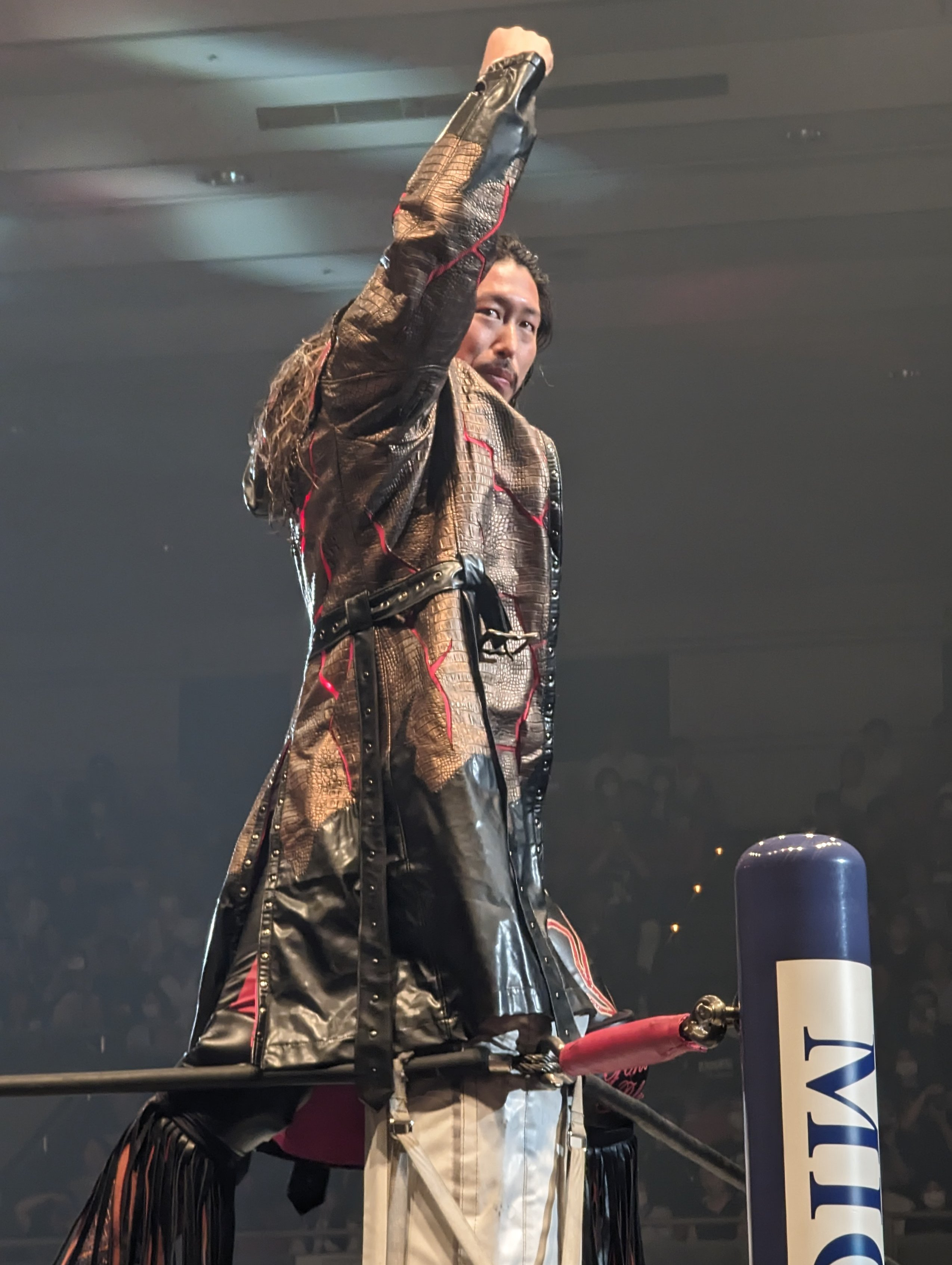
One-time and final champion Yota Tsuji

During the championship's existence there have been forty-one reigns shared among twenty-four wrestlers with two vacancy. MVP was the first champion in the title's history. Tetsuya Naito has the most reigns with eight. Shinsuke Nakamura holds the record for the longest reign in the title's history at 313 days during his first reign. Yota Tsuji's first reign of 2 days is the shortest in the title's history. Yota Tsuji was the final champion and had held the championship once.

Key
No.	Overall reign number
Reign	Reign number for the specific champion
Days	Number of days held
Defenses	Number of successful defenses

No.	Champion	Championship change			Reign statistics			Notes	Ref.
No.	Champion	Date	Event	Location	Reign	Days	Defenses	Notes	Ref.
1	MVP	May 15, 2011	Invasion Tour 2011: Attack on East Coast	Philadelphia, Pennsylvania, U.S.	1	148	2	Defeated Toru Yano in an eight–man tournament final to become the inaugural champion.	
2	Masato Tanaka	October 10, 2011	Destruction '11	Tokyo, Japan	1	125	3		
3	Hirooki Goto	February 12, 2012	The New Beginning	Osaka, Japan	1	161	2		
4	Shinsuke Nakamura	July 22, 2012	Kizuna Road	Yamagata, Japan	1	313	8		
5	La Sombra	May 31, 2013	Super Viernes	Mexico City, Mexico	1	50	1	This was a two out of three falls match.	
6	Shinsuke Nakamura	July 20, 2013	Kizuna Road	Akita, Japan	2	168	3		
7	Hiroshi Tanahashi	January 4, 2014	Wrestle Kingdom 8 in Tokyo Dome	Tokyo, Japan	1	92	1		
8	Shinsuke Nakamura	April 6, 2014	Invasion Attack	Tokyo, Japan	3	76	1		
9	Bad Luck Fale	June 21, 2014	Dominion 6.21	Osaka, Japan	1	92	1		
10	Shinsuke Nakamura	September 21, 2014	Destruction in Kobe	Kobe, Japan	4	224	3		
11	Hirooki Goto	May 3, 2015	Wrestling Dontaku	Fukuoka, Japan	2	147	1		
12	Shinsuke Nakamura	September 27, 2015	Destruction in Kobe	Kobe, Japan	5	120	2		
—	Vacated	January 25, 2016	—	Tokyo, Japan	—	—	—	Vacated due to Nakamura leaving NJPW for WWE.	
13	Kenny Omega	February 14, 2016	The New Beginning in Niigata	Nagaoka, Japan	1	126	1	Defeated Hiroshi Tanahashi to win the vacant title.	
14	Michael Elgin	June 19, 2016	Dominion 6.19 in Osaka-jo Hall	Osaka, Japan	1	98	1	This was a ladder match.	
15	Tetsuya Naito	September 25, 2016	Destruction in Kobe	Kobe, Japan	1	259	4		
16	Hiroshi Tanahashi	June 11, 2017	Dominion 6.11 in Osaka-jo Hall	Osaka, Japan	2	230	4		
17	Minoru Suzuki	January 27, 2018	The New Beginning in Sapporo	Sapporo, Japan	1	92	1		
18	Tetsuya Naito	April 29, 2018	Wrestling Hinokuni	Kumamoto, Japan	2	41	0		
19	Chris Jericho	June 9, 2018	Dominion 6.9 in Osaka-jo Hall	Osaka, Japan	1	209	1		
20	Tetsuya Naito	January 4, 2019	Wrestle Kingdom 13 in Tokyo Dome	Tokyo, Japan	3	92	1	This was a no disqualification match.	
21	Kota Ibushi	April 6, 2019	G1 Supercard	New York City, U.S.	1	64	1		
22	Tetsuya Naito	June 9, 2019	Dominion 6.9 in Osaka-jo Hall	Osaka, Japan	4	105	0		
23	Jay White	September 22, 2019	Destruction in Kobe	Kobe, Japan	1	104	1		
24	Tetsuya Naito	January 4, 2020	Wrestle Kingdom 14 in Tokyo Dome; Night 1	Tokyo, Japan	5	190	2		
25	Evil	July 12, 2020	Dominion in Osaka-jo Hall	Osaka, Japan	1	48	1	This match was also for Naito's IWGP Heavyweight Championship.	
26	Tetsuya Naito	August 29, 2020	Summer Struggle in Jingu	Tokyo, Japan	6	128	1	This match was also for Evil's IWGP Heavyweight Championship.	
27	Kota Ibushi	January 4, 2021	Wrestle Kingdom 15 in Tokyo Dome; Night 1	Tokyo, Japan	2	90	4	This match was also for Naito's IWGP Heavyweight Championship.	
—	Unified	March 4, 2021	Anniversary Event	Tokyo, Japan	—	—	—	Unified with the IWGP Heavyweight Championship to form the IWGP World Heavyweight Championship.	
28	Will Ospreay	April 4, 2021	Sakura Genesis	Tokyo, Japan	1	46	1		
—	Vacated	May 20, 2021	—	—	—	—	—	The championship was vacated due to Will Ospreay sustaining a neck injury.	
29	Shingo Takagi	June 7, 2021	Dominion 6.6 in Osaka-jo Hall	Osaka, Japan	1	211	3	Defeated Kazuchika Okada to win the vacant championship.	
30	Kazuchika Okada	January 4, 2022	Wrestle Kingdom 16; Night 1	Tokyo, Japan	1	159	4		
31	Jay White	June 12, 2022	Dominion 6.12 in Osaka-jo Hall	Osaka, Japan	2	206	2		
32	Kazuchika Okada	January 4, 2023	Wrestle Kingdom 17	Tokyo, Japan	2	94	2		
33	Sanada	April 8, 2023	Sakura Genesis	Tokyo, Japan	1	271	4		
34	Tetsuya Naito	January 4, 2024	Wrestle Kingdom 18	Tokyo, Japan	7	99	2		
35	Jon Moxley	April 12, 2024	Windy City Riot	Chicago, Illinois, U.S.	1	79	4		
36	Tetsuya Naito	June 30, 2024	AEW x NJPW: Forbidden Door	Elmont, New York, U.S.	8	106	1		
37	Zack Sabre Jr.	October 14, 2024	King of Pro-Wrestling	Tokyo, Japan	1	120	4		
38	Hirooki Goto	February 11, 2025	The New Beginning in Osaka	Osaka, Japan	3	138	7		
39	Zack Sabre Jr.	June 29, 2025	Tanahashi Jam	Nagoya, Japan	2	106	2		
40	Konosuke Takeshita	October 13, 2025	King of Pro-Wrestling	Tokyo, Japan	1	83	1		
41	Yota Tsuji	January 4, 2026	Wrestle Kingdom 20	Tokyo, Japan	1	2	0	This was a Winner Takes All match in which Tsuji's IWGP Global Heavyweight Championship was also on the line.	
—	Deactivated	January 6, 2026	Wrestle Kingdom 20 and New Year Dash!! press conference	Tokyo, Japan	—	—	—	On January 6, at the post Wrestle Kingdom 20 and New Year Dash!! press conference, Tsuji split the IWGP World Heavyweight Championship into the Heavyweight and Intercontinental Championships and retired the IWGP Intercontinental Championship. Every wrestler who won the World Heavyweight Championship were recognized as Intercontinental Champions.	

== Combined reigns ==
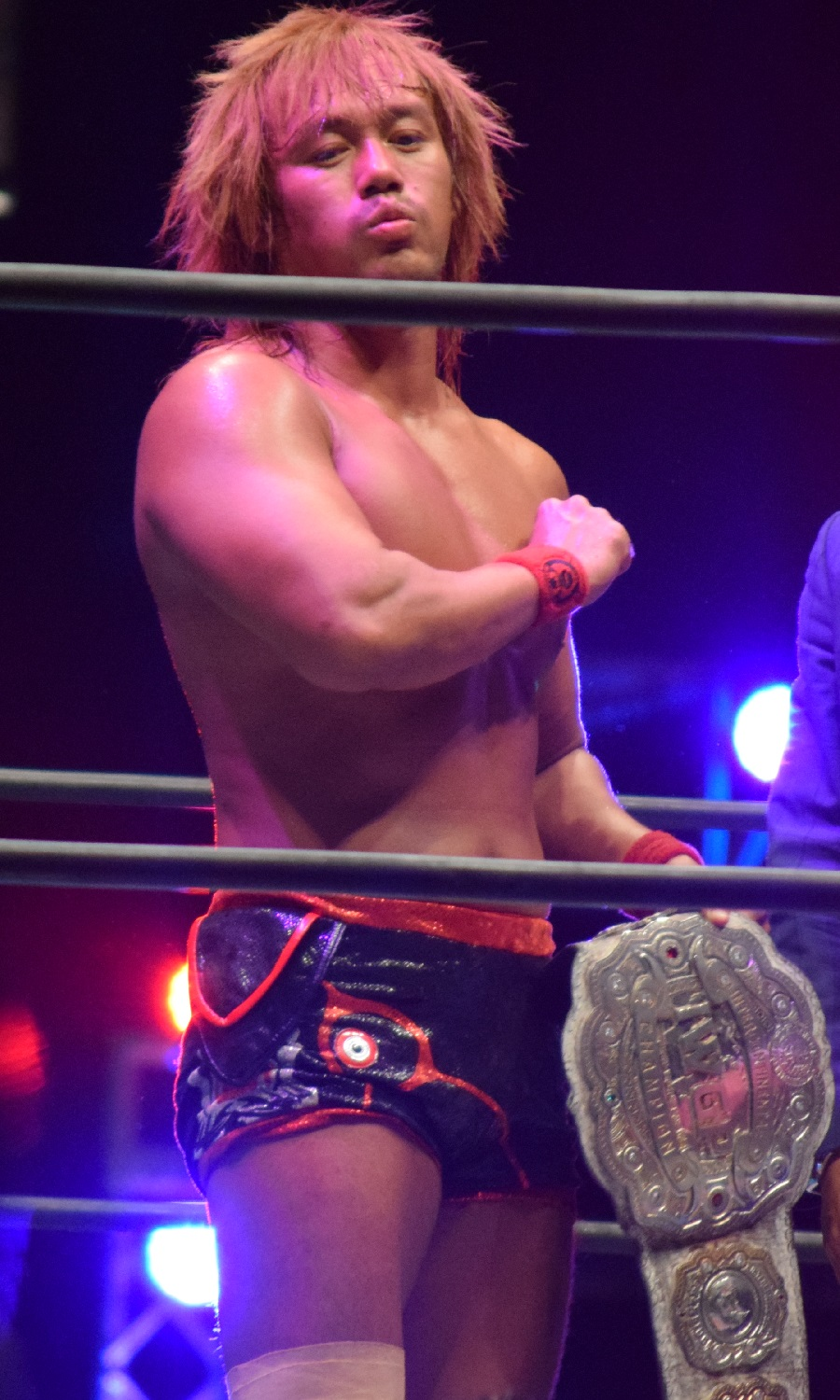
Record eight champion Tetsuya Naito

Rank	Wrestler	No. of reigns	Combined defenses	Combined days
1	Tetsuya Naito	8	11	1,019
2	Shinsuke Nakamura	5	17	901
3	Hirooki Goto	3	10	446
4	Hiroshi Tanahashi	2	5	322
5	Jay White	2	3	310
6	Sanada	1	4	271
7	Kazuchika Okada	2	6	253
8	Zack Sabre Jr.	2	6	226
9	Shingo Takagi	1	3	211
10	Chris Jericho	1	1	209
11	Kota Ibushi	2	5	154
12	MVP	1	2	148
13	Kenny Omega	1	1	126
14	Masato Tanaka	1	3	125
15	Michael Elgin	1	1	98
16	Bad Luck Fale	1	1	92
16	Minoru Suzuki	1	1	92
18	Konosuke Takeshita	1	1	83
19	Jon Moxley	1	4	79
20	La Sombra	1	1	50
21	Evil	1	1	48
22	Will Ospreay	1	1	46
23	Yota Tsuji	1	0	2

== Belt design ==
The standard Championship belt has five plates on a white leather strap.
