= Dominion 6.9 in Osaka-jo Hall (2018) =

2018 New Japan Pro-Wrestling event

- Promotional poster for the event, featuring various NJPW wrestlers
- Promotion: New Japan Pro-Wrestling
- Date: June 9, 2018
- City: Osaka, Japan
- Venue: Osaka-jō Hall
- Attendance: 11,832

Event chronology
| ← Previous; Best of the Super Jr. 25; Lion's Gate Project 12 | Next → Lion's Gate Project 13 |

Dominion chronology
| ← Previous; 6.11 | Next → 6.9 (2019) |

Dominion 6.9 in Osaka-jo Hall was a professional wrestling event promoted by New Japan Pro-Wrestling (NJPW). The event took place on June 9, 2018, at the Osaka-jō Hall, in Osaka. It is the tenth event under the Dominion name and the fourth in a row to take place at the Osaka-jō Hall.

The main event of the show saw Kenny Omega defeat Kazuchika Okada in a highly-acclaimed 2-out-of-3-falls match to win the IWGP Heavyweight Championship for the first time in his career, and end Okada's record 720-day reign. The event also saw Chris Jericho defeat Tetsuya Naito to win the IWGP Intercontinental Championship for the first time, and the 2018 Best of the Super Juniors winner Hiromu Takahashi defeat Will Ospreay to win his second IWGP Junior Heavyweight Championship.

== Production ==
Other on-screen personnel
| Role: | Name: |
|---|---|
| Commentators | Don Callis (English-language announcer) |
| Commentators | Kevin Kelly (English-language announcer) |
| Ring announcers | Makoto Abe |
| Referees | Kenta Sato |
| Referees | Marty Asami |
| Referees | Red Shoes Unno |
| Referees | Tiger Hattori |

=== Background ===
Dominion 6.9 in Osaka-jo Hall was officially announced on January 4, 2018, during Wrestle Kingdom 12. The event was NJPW's biggest between January's Wrestle Kingdom 12 and July–August's G1 Climax tournament. The event aired through NJPW's internet streaming site, NJPW World, and featured English commentary.

=== Storylines ===
Dominion 6.9 in Osaka-jo Hall featured professional wrestling matches that involve wrestlers from pre-existing scripted feuds, plots, and storylines that played out on NJPW shows. Wrestlers portray heroes or villains as they follow a series of events that build tension and culminate in a wrestling match or series of matches.

On August 14, 2016, Kenny Omega defeated Hirooki Goto to win the G1 Climax, earning an IWGP Heavyweight Championship match at Wrestle Kingdom 11. There, Kazuchika Okada beat Omega to retain the title in a critically acclaimed match. At Wrestling Dontaku, after successfully defending his title against Bad Luck Fale, Okada nominated Omega as his challenger for Dominion 6.11 in Osaka-jo Hall, where Okada and Omega's match ended in a 60-minute time limit draw with Okada retaining his title. During the same year's G1 Climax, Omega defeated Okada, advancing to the finals, but ended up losing to Tetsuya Naito in the finals. At Wrestling Dontaku 2018, after defeating Hiroshi Tanahashi, Okada once again nominated Omega as his challenger for Dominion. Okada then suggested that the match had no time limit, with Omega accepting and adding a 2-out-of-3 falls stipulation.

At 2018 New Year Dash, Chris Jericho attacked Tetsuya Naito. Despite starting a program with Naito, Jericho did not appear at any more NJPW shows. When asked on Twitter whether he was done with NJPW, Jericho said yes. At Wrestling Hinokuni Naito defeated Minoru Suzuki to win the IWGP Intercontinental Championship, and at Wrestling Dontaku Jericho returned to NJPW, attacking Naito. It was then announced that Naito would defend his title against Jericho at Dominion.

At Road to Wrestling Dontaku, Hirooki Goto successfully defended his NEVER Openweight Championship against Juice Robinson. When the match ended, Michael Elgin came to challenge Goto, but was interrupted by Taichi who would also challenge him. It was then announced that Goto would defend the title against Elgin and Taichi in a three-way match.

At Honor Rising, the Young Bucks announced their move from the junior heavyweight to the heavyweight division of NJPW. At Wrestling Dontaku's first night, following the match between Los Ingobernables de Japón and Suzuki-gun, they challenged the IWGP Tag Team Champions Sanada and Evil, who accepted the challenge. The match was made official shortly after.

At Wrestle Kingdom 12, Will Ospreay won the IWGP Junior Heavyweight Championship in a four-way match involving then champion Marty Scurll, Kushida and Hiromu Takahashi. At The New Beginning in Osaka Ospreay faced Takahashi in a singles match, defeating him to retain the title. Takahashi then went on to win the Best of the Super Juniors, earning another shot at Ospreay's title in the process.

At NJPW's 46th Anniversary Show, El Desperado and Yoshinobu Kanemaru defeated then champions Roppongi 3K (Sho and Yoh) and the team of Bushi and Hiromu Takahashi to win the IWGP Junior Heavyweight Tag Team Championship in a three-way tag team match. At Sakura Genesis, Desperado and Kanemaru defeated the two teams again to retain the titles. However, during the Best of the Super Juniors tournament, Sho and Yoh got singles victories over Desperado and Kanemaru, respectively, and were granted another shot at the belts.

At The New Beginning in Osaka, Rey Mysterio Jr. made his NJPW debut via a pre-taped message challenging Jyushin Thunder Liger to a match at Strong Style Evolved. However, Mysterio developed an injury and was forced to withdraw from the match, being replaced by Will Ospreay. Mysterio would make an appearance at the show, promising he would face Liger on a later date, and setting up feuds with Ospreay and Marty Scurll. On May 8 it was announced via NJPW's website that Mysterio would be competing at Dominion. After a match in the Best of the Super Juniors' final night, Scurll attacked Hiroshi Tanahashi with Liger making the save and setting up a six-man tag team match between Tanahashi, Liger and Mysterio and the Bullet Club team of Cody, Hangman Page and Scurll.

At The New Beginning in Sapporo, Jay White defeated Kenny Omega to win the IWGP United States Championship. David Finlay then unsuccessfully challenged for the title at Road to Wrestling Dontaku. At Wrestling Dontaku's second night, after a match between Chaos and Taguchi Japan, White tried to attack Juice Robinson and called him out on his failures to beat Naito, Omega, and Goto in title matches over the past two years. A tag team match for Dominion between the teams of White and Yoshi-Hashi and Robinson and Finlay was made official on June 5.

At the Best of the Super Juniors' final night, in a six-man tag team match, the Chaos team of Tomohiro Ishii, Toru Yano and Yoshi-Hashi defeated the Suzuki-gun team of Minoru Suzuki, Takashi Iizuka and Taka Michinoku. After the match, a confrontation began between Ishii and Suzuki. NJPW then announced, on June 5, a tag team match for Dominion with the team of Ishii and Yano facing the team of Suzuki and Zack Sabre Jr.

== Reception ==
Dominion 6.9 was met with widespread acclaim from fans and critics, with the most praise being directed towards the main event. Larry Csonka of 411mania.com stated that the show "flew by, there was nothing bad or even approaching average, and the main event delivered one of the best matches of 2018, with the crowning of Omega as champion as Okada finally falls and loses the title. This is a must see show."

Wrestling Observer Newsletter journalist Dave Meltzer gave the Okada-Omega main event 7 stars, the highest rating he has ever given. The match finished first in the 2018 Voices of Wrestling Match of the Year poll. Since its initial airing, the match has gone on to be considered among the best professional wrestling matches of all time.

== Results ==
| No. | Results | Stipulations | Times |
|---|---|---|---|
| 1 | Suzuki-gun (El Desperado and Yoshinobu Kanemaru) (c) defeated Roppongi 3K (Sho and Yoh) | Tag team match for the IWGP Junior Heavyweight Tag Team Championship | 09:29 |
| 2 | Taguchi Japan (Juice Robinson and David Finlay) defeated Chaos (Jay White and Yoshi-Hashi) | Tag team match | 07:26 |
| 3 | Suzuki-gun (Minoru Suzuki and Zack Sabre Jr.) defeated Chaos (Tomohiro Ishii and Toru Yano) | Tag team match | 08:42 |
| 4 | Michael Elgin defeated Hirooki Goto (c) and Taichi | Three-way match for the NEVER Openweight Championship | 13:46 |
| 5 | The Young Bucks (Matt Jackson and Nick Jackson) defeated Los Ingobernables de Japón (Sanada and Evil) (c) | Tag team match for the IWGP Tag Team Championship | 15:03 |
| 6 | Bullet Club (Cody, Hangman Page and Marty Scurll) defeated Hiroshi Tanahashi, Jushin Liger and Rey Mysterio Jr. | Six-man tag team match | 11:35 |
| 7 | Hiromu Takahashi defeated Will Ospreay (c) | Singles match for the IWGP Junior Heavyweight Championship | 20:20 |
| 8 | Chris Jericho defeated Tetsuya Naito (c) | Singles match for the IWGP Intercontinental Championship | 17:16 |
| 9 | Kenny Omega (with Kota Ibushi) defeated Kazuchika Okada (c) (with Gedo) 2–1 | No time limit two out of three falls match for the IWGP Heavyweight Championship | 1:04:50 |
(c) / – the champion(s) heading into the match
