= Dominion 6.19 =

- Promotion: New Japan Pro-Wrestling
- Date: June 19, 2010
- City: Osaka, Japan
- Venue: Osaka Prefectural Gymnasium
- Attendance: 5,500

Pay-per-view chronology
| ← Previous; Wrestling Dontaku | Next → Circuit New Japan Soul |

Dominion chronology
| ← Previous; 6.20 | Next → 6.18 |

New Japan Pro-Wrestling events chronology
| ← Previous; Wrestling Dontaku 2010 | Next → Destruction '10 |

Dominion 6.19 was a professional wrestling pay-per-view (PPV) event promoted by New Japan Pro-Wrestling (NJPW). The event took place on June 19, 2010, in Osaka, Osaka, at the Osaka Prefectural Gymnasium. The event featured nine matches, three of which were contested for championships.

Much like the previous year, Dominion 6.19 also featured wrestlers from Pro Wrestling Noah; namely Go Shiozaki, Muhammad Yone and Naomichi Marufuji. It was the second event under the Dominion name.

== Storylines ==
Dominion 6.19 featured ten professional wrestling matches that involved different wrestlers from pre-existing scripted feuds and storylines. Wrestlers portrayed villains, heroes, or less distinguishable characters in the scripted events that built tension and culminated in a wrestling match or series of matches.

== Event ==
The event also saw Shinsuke Nakamura make his return from a shoulder injury, defeating the debuting former WWE wrestler and mixed martial artist Daniel Puder. The match led to Nakamura and Puder teaming up for the 2010 G1 Tag League. During the event, Bad Intentions (Giant Bernard and Karl Anderson) captured the IWGP Tag Team Championship, starting a reign, which would become the longest in the title's history. The event featured the culmination of a storyline rivalry between Hiroshi Tanahashi and Toru Yano in a Hair vs. Hair match, where Tanahashi was victorious. Following the match, Tajiri made a surprise return to the promotion, saving Tanahashi from Yano and Takashi Iizuka and helping him shave Yano bald. This also led to Tanahashi and Tajiri teaming up for the 2010 G1 Tag League. The event concluded with NJPW's Togi Makabe and Prince Devitt declaring the promotion's supremacy over Pro Wrestling Noah, with Devitt having captured the IWGP Junior Heavyweight Championship from Naomichi Marufuji and Makabe retaining the IWGP Heavyweight Championship against Go Shiozaki.

== Results ==
| No. | Results | Stipulations | Times |
|---|---|---|---|
| 1 | Akira, El Samurai and Koji Kanemoto defeated Ryusuke Taguchi, Super Strong Machine and Tama Tonga | Six-man tag team match | 08:48 |
| 2 | Chaos (Gedo, Takashi Iizuka and Tomohiro Ishii) defeated Kushida, Manabu Nakanishi and Mitsuhide Hirasawa | Six-man tag team match | 09:24 |
| 3 | Muhammad Yone defeated Tomoaki Honma | Singles match | 08:58 |
| 4 | Shinsuke Nakamura defeated Daniel Puder | Singles match | 04:41 |
| 5 | Hirooki Goto defeated Masato Tanaka | Singles match | 13:39 |
| 6 | Bad Intentions (Giant Bernard and Karl Anderson) defeated Seigigun (Wataru Inoue and Yuji Nagata) (c) and No Limit (Naito and Yujiro) | Three-way elimination tag team match for the IWGP Tag Team Championship | 18:24 |
| 7 | Prince Devitt defeated Naomichi Marufuji (c) | Singles match for the IWGP Junior Heavyweight Championship | 20:20 |
| 8 | Hiroshi Tanahashi defeated Toru Yano | Hair vs. Hair match | 12:54 |
| 9 | Togi Makabe (c) defeated Go Shiozaki | Singles match for the IWGP Heavyweight Championship | 20:40 |
(c) / – the champion(s) heading into the match
