= Dominion 6.9 in Osaka-jo Hall (2019) =

2019 New Japan Pro-Wrestling event

- Promotional poster featuring Kazuchika Okada, Chris Jericho, Tomohiro Ishii, Taichi, Kota Ibushi and Tetsuya Naito
- Promotion: New Japan Pro-Wrestling
- Date: June 9, 2019
- City: Osaka, Japan
- Venue: Osaka-jō Hall
- Attendance: 11,901

New Japan Pro-Wrestling event chronology
← Previous; War of the Worlds; Best of the Super Jr. 26	Next → Kizuna Road 2019; G1 Climax 29

Dominion chronology
← Previous; 6.9 (2018)	Next → 2020

Dominion 6.9 in Osaka-jo Hall was a professional wrestling event promoted by New Japan Pro-Wrestling (NJPW). The event took place on June 9, 2019, in Osaka, Osaka, at the Osaka-jō Hall and was the eleventh event under the Dominion name and fifth in a row to take place at the Osaka-jō Hall.

The main event saw Kazuchika Okada defeat Chris Jericho to retain the IWGP Heavyweight Championship. The event also saw Tetsuya Naito defeat Kota Ibushi to win the IWGP Intercontinental Championship in a rematch from G1 Supercard, the Best of the Super Jr. 26 winner Will Ospreay defeated Dragon Lee to win his third IWGP Junior Heavyweight Championship and Tomohiro Ishii won the NEVER Openweight Champion for a record breaking fifth-time from Taichi.

Additionally, Kenta made his NJPW debut appearance at the event.

== Production ==
=== Background ===
Dominion 6.9 in Osaka-jo Hall was officially announced on January 4, 2019, during Wrestle Kingdom 13. The event is NJPW's biggest between January's Wrestle Kingdom 13 and July–August's G1 Climax tournament.

=== Storylines ===
Dominion 6.9 in Osaka-jo Hall featured professional wrestling matches that involve different wrestlers from pre-existing scripted feuds and storylines. Wrestlers portray villains, heroes, or less distinguishable characters in the scripted events that built tension and culminate in a wrestling match or series of matches.

After losing the IWGP Intercontinental Championship at Wrestle Kingdom 13 in Tokyo Dome, Chris Jericho expressed interest in challenging for the IWGP Heavyweight Championship at a later date. At Wrestling Dontaku 2019, following a successful title defense by Kazuchika Okada against Sanada, Jericho announced (on a pre-taped video package) that he would be challenging the champion Okada at this event.

At this year's New Japan Cup, Kota Ibushi defeated the then-IWGP Intercontinental Champion Tetsuya Naito in the first round, eventually setting a championship match for G1 Supercard at Madison Square Garden. There, Ibushi again defeated Naito to become Intercontinental Champion for the first time. On April 20, at Sengoku Lord in Nagoya, following Ibushi's first defense against Zack Sabre Jr., Naito went to the ring and challenged him for a rematch. Ibushi accepted the challenge and the match was scheduled for this show.

At this year's New Japan Cup, Tomohiro Ishii met Taichi in the second round, successfully defeating him. Later in the year, at Wrestling Dontaku 2019, Taichi went on to capture the NEVER Openweight Championship from Jeff Cobb while Ishii defeated Evil in a special singles match. At the Ishii vs. Evil post-match backstage interview, Taichi offered a title challenge to Ishii, with Ishii accepting. The match was then scheduled for this event.

On June 5, 2019, Will Ospreay was crowned the Best of the Super Jr. 26 tournament winner, defeating Shingo Takagi in the final at Ryōgoku Sumo Hall. By virtue of winning the tournament, he got the right to challenge the current IWGP Junior Heavyweight Champion Dragon Lee at this year's Dominion event.

After losing to Will Ospreay at the Best of the Super Jr. 26 Finals, Shingo Takagi asked to wrestle against a heavyweight at Dominion. His request was granted and will face Satoshi Kojima at this event.

At Honor Rising: Japan 2019, the Guerrillas of Destiny (Tama Tonga and Tanga Loa) won the IWGP Tag Team Championship for the fifth time when they defeated the then-champion team of Los Ingobernables de Japón (Evil and Sanada). At G1 Supercard, they won the ROH World Tag Team Championship by defeating champions Villain Enterprises (PCO and Brody King) in a winner takes all four-way tag team match for both the IWGP and ROH World Tag Team Championships which also included Evil and Sanada and The Briscoe Brothers (Jay Briscoe and Mark Briscoe). At War of the Worlds: Chicago, while Evil and Sanada defeated the team of Satoshi Kojima and Yuji Nagata, the Guerrillas of Destiny successfully defended the ROH titles against The Briscoe Brothers. Following that match, Evil and Sanada confronted the Guerrillas declaring themselves their next challengers. At a backstage interview in Best of the Super Jr. 26: Final, the Los Ingobernables de Japón team confirmed that they would be challenging for the IWGP Tag Team Championship at this event.

== Reception ==
Dave Meltzer of the Wrestling Observer Newsletter wrote that the show was notable for a "major scare in the ring" during the match between Kota Ibushi and Tetsuya Naito in which they wrestled a match exemplifying a "Can you top this?" style, but that the "risks were too high". He also considered it the modern equivalent of The Undertaker vs. Mankind. Naito attempted to German suplex Ibushi to the floor, but Ibushi's head hit the ring apron on the way down, causing "a severe whiplash that looked like it broke his neck." Ibushi claimed to have no neck injury, but Meltzer warned that "in time, this stuff adds up", pointing to the health of All Japan Pro Wrestling's 1990s stars of Kenta Kobashi, Mitsuharu Misawa and Toshiaki Kawada. Ibushi suffered a black eye from Naito's shoot (legitimate) head-butt, with Meltzer criticizing that such moves should have been banned since they ended Katsuyori Shibata's career. Due to this criticism, Meltzer decided not to rate the match. Meltzer gave the IWGP Junior Heavyweight Championship match a five star rating, the highest rated match on the card. He also awarded the IWGP Heavyweight Championship match four and a half stars. Meltzer otherwise described Dominion as a "basic major New Japan show than a card of the year candidate".

== Results ==
No.	Results	Stipulations	Times
1	Jon Moxley defeated Shota Umino	Singles match	3:52
2	Shingo Takagi defeated Satoshi Kojima	Singles match	11:14
3	Jyushin Thunder Liger and Yoshi-Hashi defeated Suzuki-gun (Minoru Suzuki and Zack Sabre Jr.)	Tag team match	9:39
4	Taguchi Japan (Hiroshi Tanahashi, Juice Robinson and Ryusuke Taguchi) defeated Bullet Club (Jay White, Chase Owens and Taiji Ishimori)	Six-man tag team match	9:48
5	Tomohiro Ishii defeated Taichi (c)	Singles match for the NEVER Openweight Championship	11:16
6	Guerrillas of Destiny (Tama Tonga and Tanga Loa) (c) (with Jado) defeated Los Ingobernables de Japón (Evil and Sanada)	Tag team match for the IWGP Tag Team Championship	16:38
7	Will Ospreay defeated Dragon Lee (c)	Singles match for the IWGP Junior Heavyweight Championship	20:07
8	Tetsuya Naito defeated Kota Ibushi (c)	Singles match for the IWGP Intercontinental Championship	22:06
9	Kazuchika Okada (c) defeated Chris Jericho	Singles match for the IWGP Heavyweight Championship	25:43
(c) / – the champion(s) heading into the match

== See also ==
- 2019 in professional wrestling
- List of NJPW pay-per-view events
