= IWGP Junior Heavyweight Tag Team Championship =

Professional wrestling tag team championship

- The IWGP Junior Heavyweight Tag Team Championship belts

Details
- Promotion: New Japan Pro-Wrestling (NJPW)
- Date established: August 8, 1998
- Status: Vacant (as of November 3, 2026)

Other names
- IWGP Junior Heavyweight Tag Team Championship (1998–present); IWGP Junior Tag Team Championship; IWGP Jr. Tag Team Championship
Statistics
- First champions: Shinjiro Otani and Tatsuhito Takaiwa
- Most reigns: As tag team: The Young Bucks (Matt Jackson and Nick Jackson) (7 reigns); As individual: Rocky Romero (8 reigns)
- Longest reign: Shinjiro Otani and Tatsuhito Takaiwa (second reign, 348 days)
- Shortest reign: Ichiban Sweet Boys (Robbie Eagles and Kosei Fujita) (third reign, 9 days)
- Oldest champion: Tiger Mask IV (51 years and 6 days)
- Youngest champion: Kosei Fujita (22 years, 5 months and 21 days)

The IWGP Junior Heavyweight Tag Team Championship (IWGPジュニアタッグ王座, IWGP juniataggu ōza) is a professional wrestling tag team championship owned by the New Japan Pro-Wrestling (NJPW) promotion. "IWGP" is the acronym of NJPW's governing body, the International Wrestling Grand Prix (インターナショナル・レスリング・グラン・プリ, intānashonaru resuringu guran puri). The title was introduced on August 8, 1998, at an NJPW live event. The IWGP Junior Heavyweight Tag Team Championship is one of two tag team titles contested for in NJPW; the IWGP Tag Team Championship is also sanctioned by NJPW. According to NJPW's official website, the Junior Heavyweight Tag Team Championship is listed as the "IWGP Jr. Tag Class", while the IWGP Tag Team Championship is considered the "IWGP Heavyweight Class". The title is contested for by junior heavyweight wrestlers; the weight-limit for the title is 100 kg (220 lb) per partner. As of November 3, 2026, the titles are currently vacated.

== History ==
Title changes happen mostly at NJPW-promoted events. The Motor City Machine Guns (Alex Shelley and Chris Sabin), a Total Nonstop Action Wrestling (TNA) tag team, defeated then-champions No Limit (Tetsuya Naito and Yujiro) on January 4, 2009, at Wrestle Kingdom III. Their reign lasted until July 5, 2009, when they were defeated by Apollo 55 (Prince Devitt and Ryusuke Taguchi) at a live event. During that time, they had three successful defenses; two were held by TNA due to a pre-existing relationship and an agreement with NJPW. Their first defense in TNA, a rematch against No Limit, occurred on March 31, 2009, at the tapings of their weekly television program TNA Impact!. On April 19, 2009, they made their second, and last, defense in TNA at the Lockdown pay-per-view event in a Three Way Tornado Tag Team Six Sides of Steel cage match against No Limit and The Latin American Xchange (Hernandez and Homicide).

== Reigns ==
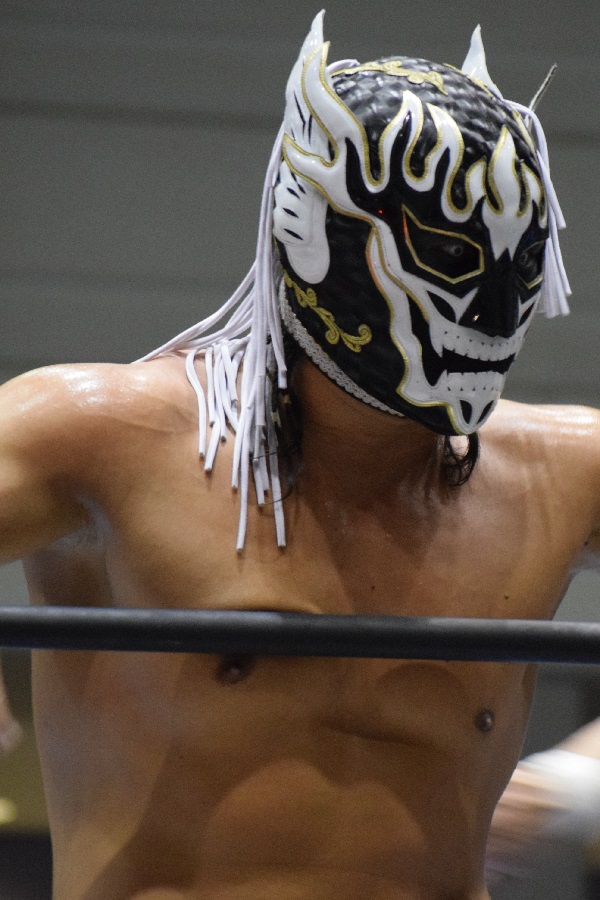
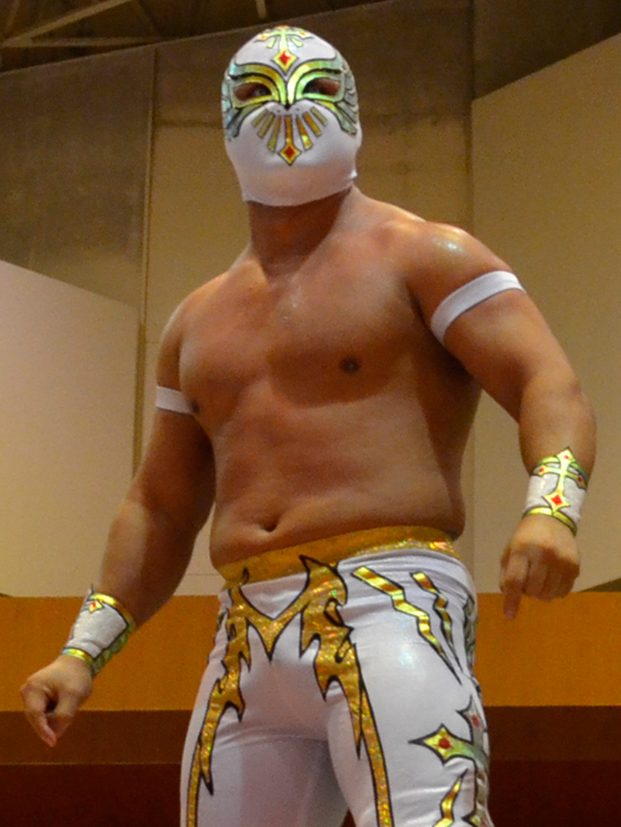
Fromer champions El Desperado and Místico

Overall, there have been 82 reigns shared among 58 different wrestlers, who made up 46 different teams. The inaugural champions were Shinjiro Otani and Tatsuhito Takaiwa, who defeated Dr. Wagner Jr. and Koji Kanemoto on August 8, 1998, in the final of a tournament.

Rocky Romero holds the record for most reigns by an individual wrestler at eight. The Young Bucks (Matt Jackson and Nick Jackson) hold the record for the most by a team at seven. Gedo and Jado's combined four reigns add up to the most of any team at 960 days, and also hold the record for most total defenses at 15. Ryusuke Taguchi holds the records for most combined days and most total defenses by an individual wrestler, with 990 days and 17 defenses respectively across his seven reigns with four different partners. Apollo 55 (Prince Devitt and Ryusuke Taguchi) hold the record for most defenses during a single reign at seven. Otani and Takaiwa's second reign is the longest in the title's history. Minoru at 348 days, and Prince Devitt's first reign is the shortest at 21 days.

The title is currently vacant after champions Las Máscaras de Oro (El Desperado and Místico) relinquished the title due to Desperado being diagnosed with spinal canal stenosis and a hernia injury. They originally won the title by defeating Ichiban Sweet Boys (Robbie Eagles and Kosei Fujita) on Night 2 of Wrestling Dontaku in Fukuoka, Japan, on May 4, 2026.
