= The New Beginning in Osaka (2015) =

Professional wrestling event in Osaka, Japan

- Promotional poster for the event, featuring Tetsuya Naito, Kazuchika Okada, Hiroshi Tanahashi, Shinsuke Nakamura, Togi Makabe and Hirooki Goto
- Promotion: New Japan Pro-Wrestling
- Date: February 11, 2015
- City: Osaka, Japan
- Venue: Osaka Prefectural Gymnasium
- Attendance: 7,500

Pay-per-view chronology
← Previous; Wrestle Kingdom 9 in Tokyo Dome	Next → New Japan Cup

The New Beginning chronology
← Previous; Osaka 2014	Next → Sendai

New Japan Pro-Wrestling events chronology
← Previous; Fantastica Mania 2015	Next → Invasion Attack

The New Beginning in Osaka (2015) was a professional wrestling pay-per-view (PPV) promoted by New Japan Pro-Wrestling (NJPW). The event took place on February 11, 2015, in Osaka, Osaka at the Osaka Prefectural Gymnasium and featured ten matches, four of which were contested for championships.

The event also aired in Japan on TV Asahi, in addition to streaming worldwide through NJPW's NJPW World service. It was the seventh event under the New Beginning name and the second under the New Beginning in Osaka name.

== Storylines ==
The New Beginning in Osaka featured ten professional wrestling matches that involved different wrestlers from pre-existing scripted feuds and storylines. Wrestlers portrayed villains, heroes, or less distinguishable characters in the scripted events that built tension and culminated in a wrestling match or series of matches.

The first matches for the event were announced on January 6, 2015, two days after NJPW's biggest event of the year, Wrestle Kingdom 9 in Tokyo Dome. The main event was scheduled to feature Hiroshi Tanahashi defending the IWGP Heavyweight Championship against A.J. Styles. This would be a rematch from King of Pro-Wrestling on October 13, 2014, where Styles lost the title to Tanahashi. At Wrestle Kingdom 9 in Tokyo Dome, Tanahashi successfully defended the title against Kazuchika Okada, while Styles earned a big win over Tetsuya Naito. The following day, Styles pinned Tanahashi in an eight-man tag team match, before requesting his title rematch. In the build-up to the title match, Tanahashi stated that he was not only looking to avenge his friend Yoshitatsu, who legitimately broke his neck in a match with Styles the previous November, but also give thanks to him for helping him overcome Styles' Bullet Club stable to capture the IWGP Heavyweight Championship.

The event would also feature several rematches from Wrestle Kingdom 9 in Tokyo Dome. Meiyu Tag (Hirooki Goto and Katsuyori Shibata), who won the IWGP Tag Team Championship at the Tokyo Dome, would defend their newly won title against the previous champions, Bullet Club's Doc Gallows and Karl Anderson. Meanwhile, Gallows and Anderson's Bullet Club stablemate Kenny Omega, who won the IWGP Junior Heavyweight Championship at the Tokyo Dome, would defend his title in a rematch with Ryusuke Taguchi. The fourth match announced on January 6 would see reDRagon (Bobby Fish and Kyle O'Reilly) make their second defense of the IWGP Junior Heavyweight Tag Team Championship in a three-way match against Time Splitters (Alex Shelley and Kushida) and The Young Bucks (Matt Jackson and Nick Jackson). At Wrestle Kingdom 9 in Tokyo Dome, reDRagon made their first defense in a four-way match against Time Splitters, The Young Bucks and Forever Hooligans (Alex Koslov and Rocky Romero). Due to being the team pinned by reDRagon at the Tokyo Dome, Forever Hooligans were removed from the title match at The New Beginning in Osaka.

The card for The New Beginning in Osaka was completed on January 20 with the addition of six more matches. Included were a singles match between Kota Ibushi and Tomoaki Honma and three six-man tag team matches. National Wrestling Alliance (NWA) wrestlers Chase Owens and Rob Conway were also added to the card as a build-up to two NWA title matches taking place at The New Beginning in Sendai three days later. They would team up to take on their title opponents Hiroyoshi Tenzan and Jyushin Thunder Liger in a tag team match. One of the six-man tag team matches saw the Bullet Club trio of Bad Luck Fale, Tama Tonga and Yujiro Takahashi take on Kazuchika Okada, Kazushi Sakuraba and Toru Yano. This was part of a storyline, where Okada was both physically and mentally broken after losing to Hiroshi Tanahashi in the main event of Wrestle Kingdom 9 in Tokyo Dome, which led to him going on a streak of "bad luck", including suffering a loss against Fale in a match the following day and being involved in a legitimate car accident.

On the morning of the event, Togi Makabe was pulled from the card due to influenza. He was replaced in a six-man tag team match, which was scheduled to act as a build-up to a NEVER Openweight Championship match between Makabe and Tomohiro Ishii, by Satoshi Kojima, who was moved up from another scheduled six-man tag team match, which was instead turned into a tag team match.

== Event ==
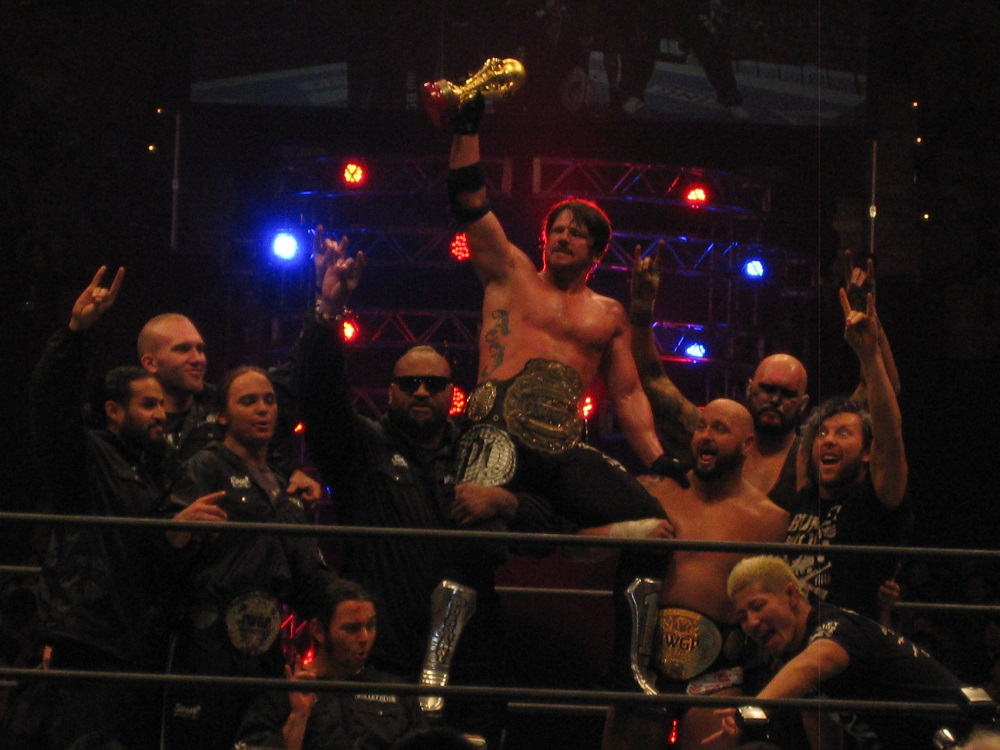
Bullet Club celebrating their success at The New Beginning in Osaka, which included three title wins and one successful title defense for members of the stable

In the first title match of the event, The Young Bucks defeated reDRagon and Time Splitters to become the new IWGP Junior Heavyweight Tag Team Champions. The Bullet Club duo won the title for the second time, while reDRagon's three-month reign ended in their second defense. In the following match, Kenny Omega made his first successful defense of the IWGP Junior Heavyweight Championship against previous champion, Ryusuke Taguchi. After the match Omega attacked Taguchi with help from The Young Bucks, before being interrupted by Alex Shelley and Máscara Dorada, with the latter proceeding to challenge Omega to a title match. In the next match, Bullet Club suffered its only loss of the night, when Bad Luck Fale, Tama Tonga and Yujiro Takahashi were defeated by Kazuchika Okada, Kazushi Sakuraba and Toru Yano. Though showing signs of revival, Okada did not manage to avenge his loss against Fale, instead pinning Tonga for the win, but provoked his rival following the match by posing over Tonga. The third title match saw Bullet Club's Doc Gallows and Karl Anderson bounce back from their loss at Wrestle Kingdom 9 in Tokyo Dome and defeat Hirooki Goto and Katsuyori Shibata to recapture the IWGP Tag Team Championship. Bullet Club's night was capped off in the main event, where A.J. Styles defeated Hiroshi Tanahashi to win the IWGP Heavyweight Championship for the second time. The match featured outside interference from Styles' Bullet Club stablemates and ended with Tanahashi bleeding, after colliding heads with Matt Jackson. Bullet Club ended the night by declaring their dominance over NJPW.

== Reception ==
Reviewing the event for his Wrestling Observer Newsletter, Dave Meltzer wrote that most of the matches at The New Beginning in Osaka were "good", but that none were "off the charts", while also noting that the crowd felt cold in what is traditionally NJPW's hottest arena. According to Meltzer, the event showed that NJPW had begun suffering from a "feeling of sameness" following Wrestle Kingdom 9 in Tokyo Dome. He gave the highest match rating of four out of five stars to the main event, though stating that the match did not have the spark that the previous two matches between Styles and Tanahashi had had.

== Results ==
No.	Results	Stipulations	Times
1	Sho Tanaka defeated Yohei Komatsu	Singles match	05:38
2	Máscara Dorada and Tiger Mask defeated Captain New Japan and Manabu Nakanishi	Tag team match	05:03
3	The Illuminati (Chase Owens and Rob Conway) (with Bruce Tharpe) defeated Hiroyoshi Tenzan and Jyushin Thunder Liger	Tag team match	07:53
4	Kota Ibushi defeated Tomoaki Honma	Singles match	12:15
5	The Young Bucks (Matt Jackson and Nick Jackson) (with Cody Hall) defeated reDRagon (Bobby Fish and Kyle O'Reilly) (c) and Time Splitters (Alex Shelley and Kushida)	Three-way tag team match for the IWGP Junior Heavyweight Tag Team Championship	13:31
6	Kenny Omega (c) (with Cody Hall, Matt Jackson and Nick Jackson) defeated Ryusuke Taguchi	Singles match for the IWGP Junior Heavyweight Championship	13:58
7	Kazuchika Okada, Kazushi Sakuraba and Toru Yano defeated Bullet Club (Bad Luck Fale, Tama Tonga and Yujiro Takahashi)	Six-man tag team match	11:45
8	Satoshi Kojima, Tetsuya Naito and Yuji Nagata defeated Chaos (Shinsuke Nakamura, Tomohiro Ishii and Yoshi-Hashi)	Six-man tag team match	16:30
9	Bullet Club (Doc Gallows and Karl Anderson) defeated Meiyu Tag (Hirooki Goto and Katsuyori Shibata) (c)	Tag team match for the IWGP Tag Team Championship	16:26
10	A.J. Styles (with Bad Luck Fale, Cody Hall, Doc Gallows, Karl Anderson, Kenny Omega, Matt Jackson, Nick Jackson, Tama Tonga and Yujiro Takahashi) defeated Hiroshi Tanahashi (c) (with Captain New Japan)	Singles match for the IWGP Heavyweight Championship	26:08
(c) / – the champion(s) heading into the match
