= The New Beginning in Sendai =

2015 professional wrestling event

- Promotional poster for the event, featuring Tetsuya Naito, Kazuchika Okada, Hiroshi Tanahashi, Shinsuke Nakamura, Togi Makabe and Hirooki Goto
- Promotion: New Japan Pro-Wrestling
- Date: February 14, 2015
- City: Sendai, Japan
- Venue: Sendai Sun Plaza Hall
- Attendance: 2,900

Event chronology
← Previous; The New Beginning in Osaka	Next → New Japan Cup

The New Beginning chronology
← Previous; 2015	Next → 2016

The New Beginning in Sendai was a professional wrestling event promoted by New Japan Pro-Wrestling (NJPW). The event took place on February 14, 2015, in Sendai, Miyagi at the Sendai Sun Plaza Hall and featured ten matches, four of which were contested for championships. The event aired worldwide through NJPW's new internet streaming site, NJPW World, and was the eighth event under the New Beginning name.

== Storylines ==
The New Beginning in Sendai featured ten professional wrestling matches that involved different wrestlers from pre-existing scripted feuds and storylines. Wrestlers portrayed villains, heroes, or less distinguishable characters in the scripted events that built tension and culminated in a wrestling match or series of matches.

The first matches for the event were announced on January 6, 2015, two days after NJPW's biggest event of the year, Wrestle Kingdom 9 in Tokyo Dome. The main event was scheduled to feature Shinsuke Nakamura defending the IWGP Intercontinental Championship against Yuji Nagata. At Wrestle Kingdom 9 in Tokyo Dome, Nakamura made the second defense of his fourth Intercontinental title reign against Kota Ibushi, while Nagata won the New Japan Rumble on the pre-show before the event. The following day, Nagata led his team to a six-man tag team match win over Nakamura and his Chaos stable, before asserting himself as the next challenger for the IWGP Intercontinental Championship. In the build-up to the title match, Nagata pinned Nakamura in a tag team match on February 1. The match marked Nagata's return to the IWGP title picture; recently Nagata had been more active in the title picture of the Pro Wrestling Noah promotion, where he held the GHC Heavyweight Championship in 2014. Last time Nagata wrestled for a title owned by NJPW was on June 19, 2010, when he and Wataru Inoue lost the IWGP Tag Team Championship.

Also announced was a rematch from Wrestle Kingdom 9 in Tokyo Dome, where Togi Makabe was scheduled to defend his newly won NEVER Openweight Championship against previous champion Tomohiro Ishii. However, on the morning of the event, NJPW announced that Makabe had not recovered from his recent influenza and would be forced to pull out of the match. As a result, the NEVER Openweight Championship was vacated and it was announced that Ishii and Tomoaki Honma would face off in a match to determine the new champion. The event would also feature two matches for titles governed by the National Wrestling Alliance (NWA). In the first, the returning Rob Conway would defend the NWA World Heavyweight Championship against Hiroyoshi Tenzan. Conway won the title on June 2, 2014, from Tenzan's longtime tag team partner Satoshi Kojima. On November 22, during the opening day of the 2014 World Tag League, Tenzan submitted Conway in a tag team match, where he and Kojima defeated Conway and Jax Dane, before challenging him to a match for his title. This match marked Tenzan's first singles title shot since October 2006. In the second match, Jyushin Thunder Liger would defend the NWA World Junior Heavyweight Championship against Chase Owens. This is a rematch from Power Struggle on November 8, 2014, where Liger defeated Owens to win the title. After making his first title defense against El Desperado on January 5, 2015, Liger named his longtime tag team partner Tiger Mask his next challenger, but the next day Owens was instead named his second challenger.

The card for The New Beginning in Sendai was completed on January 20 with the addition of six more matches; three tag team matches and three six-man tag team matches. Some matches were part of a follow-up from title matches taking place three days earlier at The New Beginning in Osaka. Early in the card, Kenny Omega and The Young Bucks (Matt Jackson and Nick Jackson), the junior heavyweight members of the villainous Bullet Club stable, were scheduled to take on Ryusuke Taguchi and the Time Splitters (Alex Shelley and Kushida). At The New Beginning in Osaka, Omega successfully defended the IWGP Junior Heavyweight Championship against Taguchi, while The Young Bucks defeated Time Splitters and defending champions, reDRagon (Bobby Fish and Kyle O'Reilly), in a three-way match to capture the IWGP Junior Heavyweight Tag Team Championship. However, on February 12, NJPW announced Taguchi had suffered a neck injury and would be replaced in the match by Máscara Dorada. Following the IWGP Junior Heavyweight Championship match at The New Beginning in Osaka, Omega and The Young Bucks attacked Taguchi, giving him a triple-team piledriver, which led to the storyline injury. Dorada, who was working his first tour under a NJPW contract, having signed one in January, then entered the ring and made a title challenge to Omega.

Meanwhile, Hiroshi Tanahashi, Hirooki Goto and Katsuyori Shibata would team up to take on Bullet Club's Doc Gallows, Karl Anderson and Tama Tonga as part of a follow-up from The New Beginning in Osaka, where Goto and Shibata lost the IWGP Tag Team Championship to Anderson and Gallows, while Tanahashi lost the IWGP Heavyweight Championship to their stablemate A.J. Styles, who instantly after his title win left the country to wrestle at an event in the United Kingdom and was thus absent from The New Beginning in Sendai. Another match would see two more Bullet Club representatives, Bad Luck Fale and Yujiro Takahashi, take on Chaos' Kazuchika Okada and Yoshi-Hashi. This was part of a storyline, where Okada was both physically and mentally broken after losing to Hiroshi Tanahashi in the main event of Wrestle Kingdom 9 in Tokyo Dome, which led to him going on a streak of "bad luck", including suffering a loss against Fale in a match the following day and being involved in a legitimate car accident. Also added to the card was the Ring of Honor (ROH) tag team reDRagon, who would take on Tiger Mask and Jay White, a New Zealand rookie, who replaced Máscara Dorada after he was moved up in the card.

== Event ==
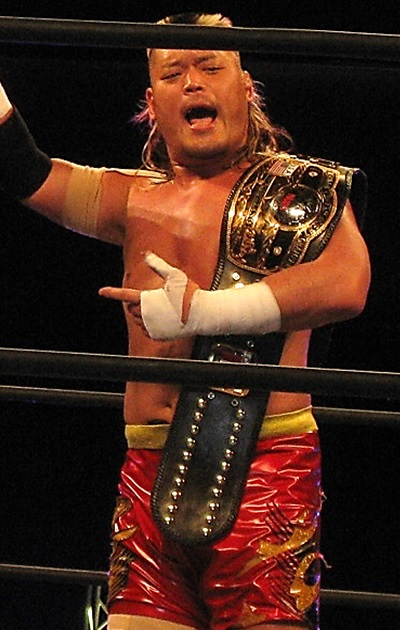
Hiroyoshi Tenzan as the NWA World Heavyweight Champion

Following The New Beginning in Osaka, where Bullet Club won all four championship matches, The New Beginning in Sendai featured three matches involving Bullet Club and all ended with the villainous stable being defeated. In the first, Máscara Dorada and the Time Splitters defeated Kenny Omega and The Young Bucks, with Dorada pinning Omega for the win, before making another challenge for a title match. In the first title match of the event, Jyushin Thunder Liger made his second successful defense of the NWA World Junior Heavyweight Championship against previous champion, Chase Owens. After the match, Liger again nominated Tiger Mask as his next challenger. The second NWA title match also ended with a win for NJPW as Hiroyoshi Tenzan defeated Rob Conway to become the new NWA World Heavyweight Champion. This marked Tenzan's first singles title win in ten years. Following the win, Tenzan was challenged to a title match by Satoshi Kojima.

The seventh match continued the rivalry between Kazuchika Okada and Bad Luck Fale. After pinning Tama Tonga at The New Beginning in Osaka, Okada continued his revival by pinning another Bullet Club member, Yujiro Takahashi, to win the match at The New Beginning in Sendai and afterwards, much like in Osaka, taunted Fale by posing over his fallen stablemate. Following the match, Okada also challenged Fale to a match at the 2015 New Japan Cup. In the third title match of the event, Tomohiro Ishii defeated Tomoaki Honma to win the now vacant NEVER Openweight Championship for the third time. Though officially recognized as the new champion, Ishii instead dubbed himself an "interim" champion, suggesting he wanted another match with Togi Makabe. In the main event of the evening, Shinsuke Nakamura made his third successful defense of the IWGP Intercontinental Championship against Yuji Nagata. Afterwards, Nakamura suggested that his Chaos stablemate Kazuchika Okada should challenge for his title next, instead of continuing to chase the IWGP Heavyweight Championship.

== Reception ==
Dave Meltzer of the Wrestling Observer Newsletter gave the match between Honma and Ishii a full five-star rating.

== Aftermath ==
The two NWA title matches teased at The New Beginning in Sendai took place during the following "Road to Invasion Attack 2015" tour. On March 21, Tenzan successfully defended the NWA World Heavyweight Championship against Kojima and the following day Liger successfully defended the NWA World Junior Heavyweight Championship against Tiger Mask.

== Results ==
No.	Results	Stipulations	Times
1	Captain New Japan and Manabu Nakanishi defeated Satoshi Kojima and Yohei Komatsu	Tag team match	06:19
2	reDRagon (Bobby Fish and Kyle O'Reilly) defeated Jay White and Tiger Mask	Tag team match	10:31
3	Time Splitters (Alex Shelley and Kushida) and Máscara Dorada defeated Bullet Club (Kenny Omega, Matt Jackson and Nick Jackson) (with Cody Hall)	Six-man tag team match	11:11
4	Jyushin Thunder Liger (c) (with Tiger Mask) defeated Chase Owens (with Bruce Tharpe)	Singles match for the NWA World Junior Heavyweight Championship	07:49
5	Hiroyoshi Tenzan (with Satoshi Kojima) defeated Rob Conway (c) (with Bruce Tharpe)	Singles match for the NWA World Heavyweight Championship	11:50
6	Kota Ibushi and Tetsuya Naito defeated Kazushi Sakuraba and Toru Yano	Tag team match	12:51
7	Chaos (Kazuchika Okada and Yoshi-Hashi) (with Gedo) defeated Bullet Club (Bad Luck Fale and Yujiro Takahashi) (with Cody Hall)	Tag team match	09:55
8	Hiroshi Tanahashi and Meiyu Tag (Hirooki Goto and Katsuyori Shibata) defeated Bullet Club (Doc Gallows, Karl Anderson and Tama Tonga) (with Cody Hall)	Six-man tag team match	12:07
9	Tomohiro Ishii defeated Tomoaki Honma	Singles match for the vacant NEVER Openweight Championship	24:46
10	Shinsuke Nakamura (c) defeated Yuji Nagata (with Hiroyoshi Tenzan, Manabu Nakanishi and Satoshi Kojima)	Singles match for the IWGP Intercontinental Championship	17:55
(c) / – the champion(s) heading into the match
