= Wrestle Kingdom 9 =

2015 professional wrestling pay-per-view event

- Promotional poster for the event, featuring various NJPW wrestlers
- Promotion: New Japan Pro-Wrestling
- Date: January 4, 2015
- City: Tokyo, Japan
- Venue: Tokyo Dome
- Attendance: 36,000

Pay-per-view chronology
← Previous; World Tag League	Next → New Year Dash!!

Wrestle Kingdom chronology
← Previous; 8	Next → 10

New Japan Pro-Wrestling events chronology
← Previous; Power Struggle	Next → The New Beginning in Osaka

Wrestle Kingdom 9 in Tokyo Dome was a pay-per-view (PPV) professional wrestling event produced by the New Japan Pro-Wrestling (NJPW) promotion, which took place at the Tokyo Dome in Tokyo, Japan on January 4, 2015. It was the 24th January 4 Tokyo Dome Show and the first event on the 2015 NJPW schedule. The event featured ten professional wrestling matches and one pre-show match, six of which were for championships.

In the double main event, Shinsuke Nakamura successfully defended the IWGP Intercontinental Championship against Kota Ibushi, and Hiroshi Tanahashi successfully defended the IWGP Heavyweight Championship against Kazuchika Okada. A Tanahashi–Okada heavyweight title match had headlined Wrestle Kingdom 7 two years earlier and was also the main event the following year at Wrestle Kingdom 10. Although the IWGP Junior Heavyweight Tag Team Championship was successfully defended, the IWGP Tag Team Championship, IWGP Junior Heavyweight Championship and NEVER Openweight Championship changed hands. The appearance of Pro Wrestling Noah wrestlers led to a storyline in which NJPW's Suzuki-gun group began wrestling at Noah events starting the week after Wrestle Kingdom 9.

The event was attended by 36,000 people. Through NJPW's partnership with Global Force Wrestling (GFW), the event was broadcast with English commentary as a GFW event. It was available on PPV television in the United States and Canada, and broadcast worldwide on the Internet via Flipps and NJPW World. Critics issued positive reviews; Philly.com said it featured "good, quality wrestling", while Paste magazine said it presented "some of the most passionate and poignant performance art today". Readers of the Wrestling Observer Newsletter voted Wrestle Kingdom 9 the Best Major Wrestling Show of 2015; they also named the Ibushi–Nakamura match as the 2015 Pro Wrestling Match of the Year.

== Production ==
Other on-screen personnel
Role:	Name:
Japanese ommentators
Japanese ommentators	Kazuo Yamazaki
Japanese ommentators	Kakuryo Yasuda
Japanese ommentators	Katsuhiko Kanazawa
Japanese ommentators	Shinpei Nogami
Japanese ommentators	Soichi Shibata
Japanese ommentators	Shumpei Terakawa
Japanese ommentators	Yohei Onishi
Japanese ommentators	Shinji Yoshino
English commentators
English commentators	Jim Ross
English commentators	Matt Striker
Ring announcers	Makoto Abe
Referees	Kenta Sato
Referees	Marty Asami
Referees	Red Shoes Unno
Referees	Tiger Hattori

=== Background ===
Wrestle Kingdom has been described as "New Japan's major annual show" and the "equivalent" of WWE's WrestleMania event. Wrestle Kingdom 9 in Tokyo Dome was promoted as the "largest wrestling show in the world outside of the United States" and was the 24th January 4 Tokyo Dome Show, although previous events were held under different names.

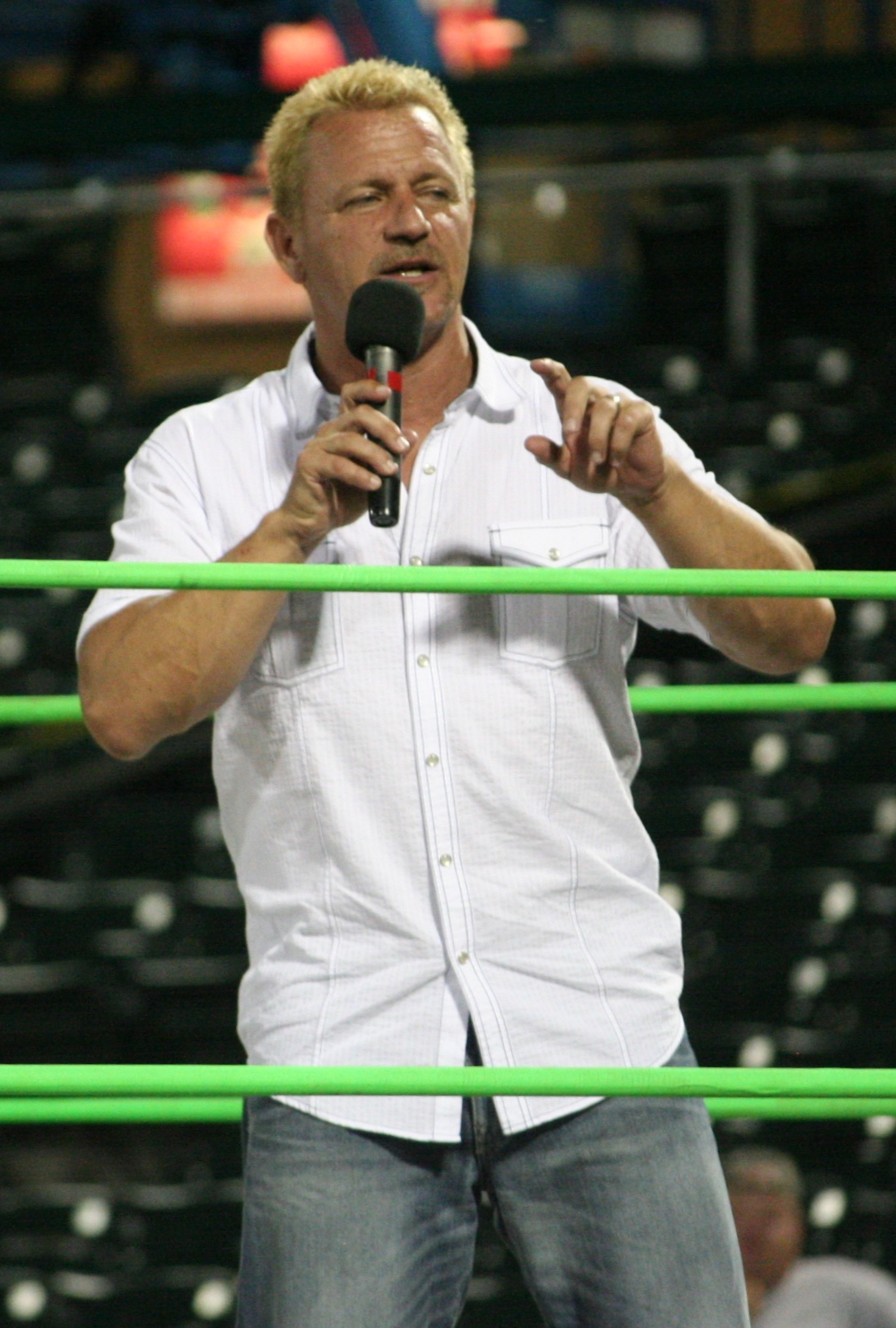
Global Force Wrestling owner Jeff Jarrett, who participated at the event and also helped broadcast the event to the American market

On August 10, 2014, NJPW made two announcements. Firstly, Wrestle Kingdom 9 would be held at the Tokyo Dome on January 4, 2015. Secondly, NJPW revealed a partnership with Jeff Jarrett's Global Force Wrestling, which it approached about bringing the event to a new market. On November 4, GFW announced that it would present the event live on American pay-per-view television and that it had a PPV market of 125 million homes.

The event was broadcast on American PPV as the first GFW event. The four-hour "GFW Presents New Japan Pro Wrestling's Wrestle Kingdom 9" telecast was available from pay-per-view providers in the United States, including DirecTV, Dish Network, AT&T U-verse, Comcast, Verizon FiOS and all cable systems, and in Canada from Bell ExpressVu, Rogers, Shaw, Sasktel and Telus. The event also aired live on NJPW World, an Internet streaming site introduced by NJPW in early December 2014 which reportedly had 20,000 subscribers worldwide in late January 2015. In Japan, the event also aired on PPV in SKY PerfecTV!'s Sukachan service. In January 2016, Dave Meltzer of the Wrestling Observer Newsletter stated that Wrestle Kingdom 9 "was the only live pro wrestling PPV event ever broadcast [internationally] from Japan".

The GFW version of the event was streamed worldwide (except in North America and Japan) on the Flipps application for Internet-connected smartphones, tablet computers and smart TVs. On Flipps, the show was available live and on-demand for 30 days after its initial airing.

On November 11, 2014, GFW announced that Jim Ross would be the lead announcer for its version of the event. It was Ross's first professional-wrestling broadcast since his 2013 departure from WWE. Ross attempted to obtain Mike Tenay of Total Nonstop Action Wrestling (TNA) for color commentary, but TNA refused. Others considered for the job were John Pollock, Mauro Ranallo and Kevin Nash, before GFW settled on Matt Striker.

Before the event, the GFW broadcasts experienced setbacks. Many cable companies decided not to air the event live, opting instead for a replay of UFC 182, and the stream would not run on three of the four most used devices compatible with Flipps: Chromecast, Xbox 360 and Xbox One. According to Dave Meltzer, NJPW undercut GFW by including the event in the $8.42 monthly price for NJPW World; the GFW broadcast of Wrestle Kingdom 9 alone was $34.95. The NJPW World stream had Japanese commentary only.

AXS TV, which acquired the rights to broadcast Wrestle Kingdom 9 from the TV Asahi Corporation, aired the event in five parts from October 9 to November 6, 2015, to viewers in the United States, Canada, Mexico and the Caribbean. Commentary was provided by Mauro Ranallo and Josh Barnett.

=== Storylines ===
Wrestle Kingdom 9 featured ten professional wrestling matches and one pre-show match. It saw professional wrestlers performing as characters in scripted events pre-determined by the hosting promotion, New Japan Pro-Wrestling.

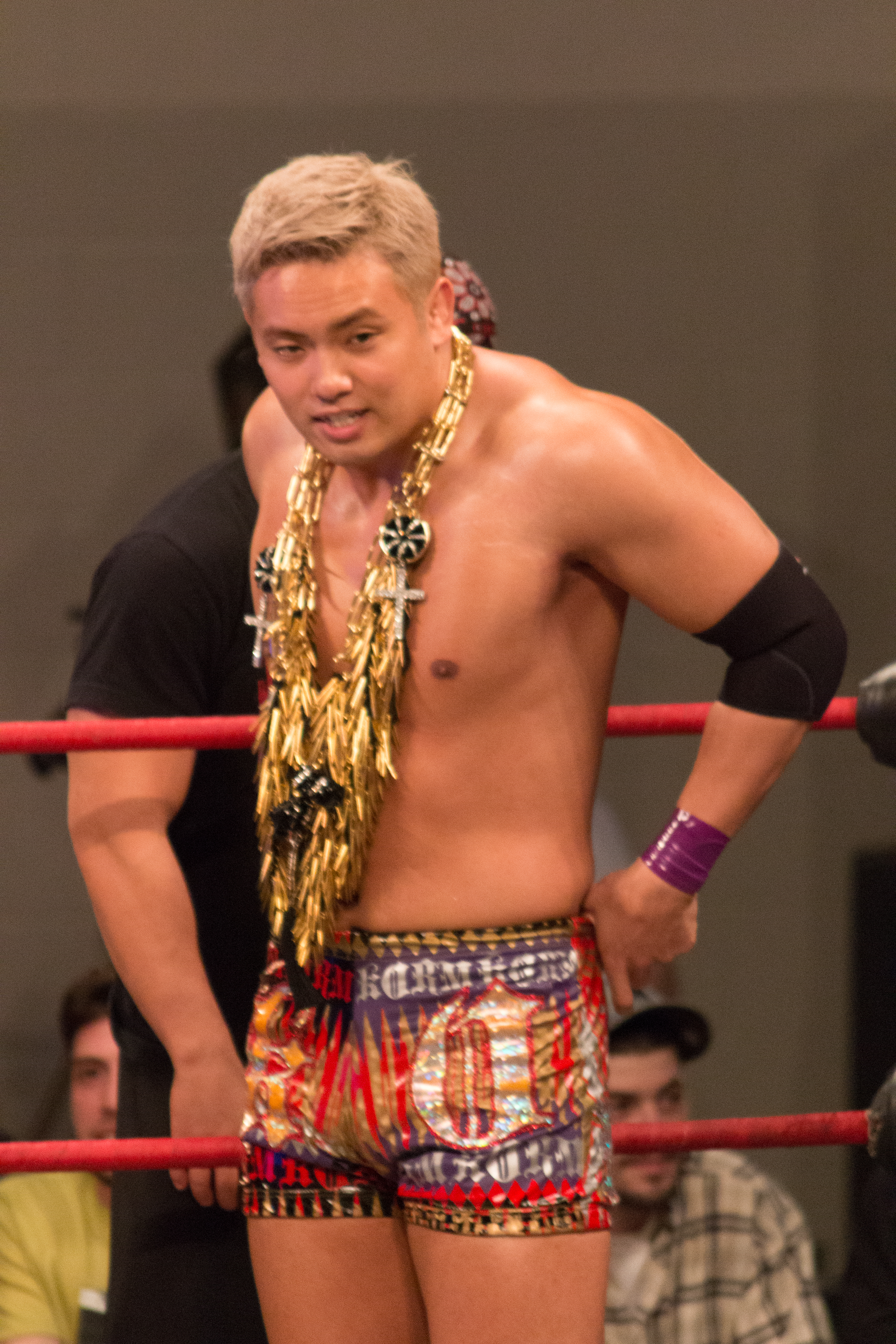
Kazuchika Okada, number-one contender for the IWGP Heavyweight Championship, at Wrestle Kingdom 9

The event was headlined by Hiroshi Tanahashi defending the IWGP Heavyweight Championship against Kazuchika Okada. Tanahashi won the title by defeating A.J. Styles on October 13, 2014, at the NJPW King of Pro-Wrestling event. Okada became the number one contender at Wrestle Kingdom 9 by winning the G1 Climax on August 10, 2014. Over the following months, he defended his position against Karl Anderson and Tetsuya Naito. The Wrestle Kingdom 9 main event was the seventh match between Okada and Tanahashi since February 2012 and their second January 4 Tokyo Dome Show main event after Wrestle Kingdom 7 on January 4, 2013.

Wrestle Kingdom 9's other main event was determined at the November 8, 2014, NJPW Power Struggle show. After Shinsuke Nakamura defended the IWGP Intercontinental Championship against Katsuyori Shibata, Kota Ibushi entered the ring, assaulted Nakamura, and issued a title challenge; Nakamura accepted. This was a turning point in Ibushi's career, since he had recently joined the heavyweight division after gaining weight. A previous singles match between Nakamura and Ibushi during the 2013 G1 Climax was ranked "Best Bout of the Year" by the Tokyo Sports newspaper.

Previous IWGP Heavyweight Champion A.J. Styles (of the Bullet Club group) and fellow top contender Tetsuya Naito were slated to wrestle each other at Wrestle Kingdom 9. During the 2014 G1 Climax (when Styles was IWGP Heavyweight Champion), Naito pinned him in a non-title tournament match but did not have a title shot before Styles lost to Tanahashi. Since Styles did not receive a rematch with Tanahashi, it was theorized by the American media that the Wrestle Kingdom 9 winner would be the top contender.

Another title that was contested at Wrestle Kingdom 9 was the IWGP Tag Team Championship, with Doc Gallows and Karl Anderson defending against Hirooki Goto and Katsuyori Shibata. Goto and Shibata teamed up after a match against each other at the January 4, 2014, NJPW Wrestle Kingdom 8, and the two former high-school classmates named their team "Meiyu Tag" (meiyu means "sworn brothers" in Japanese). In March 2014, they entered the IWGP Tag Team Championship picture by defeating the Bullet Club's IWGP Tag Team Champions Anderson and Gallows in a non-title match at NJPW's 42nd-anniversary event. This led to a title match at the April 6 NJPW Invasion Attack 2014, where Anderson and Gallows retained the title. In December, Goto and Shibata won the 2014 World Tag League tournament, defeating Anderson and Gallows in the final to earn another chance at the title.

Wrestle Kingdom 9 also showcased a rivalry between Toru Yano and the Suzuki-gun group, which had been going on since 2013. In May 2014, Yano's tag team partner Takashi Iizuka joined Suzuki-gun, which led to Yano recruiting Kazushi Sakuraba as his new tag team partner to continue the feud. The rivalry lasted for the rest of the year, resulting in two Wrestle Kingdom 9 matches: one between former mixed martial artists Sakuraba and Suzuki-gun leader Minoru Suzuki, and a tag team match pitting Yano and a "mystery partner" against a Suzuki-gun team. The latter became an eight-man tag team match, with Suzuki-gun represented by Iizuka, Shelton X Benjamin, and the Killer Elite Squad (Davey Boy Smith Jr. and Lance Archer). Yano recruited three partners from the Pro Wrestling Noah promotion: Naomichi Marufuji and TMDK (Mikey Nicholls and Shane Haste).

The Wrestle Kingdom 9 undercard featured several matches involving the Bullet Club, which was led by A.J. Styles. The group dominated NJPW for most of 2014, holding all four of its heavyweight championships during the summer. After the NJPW–GFW partnership was forged, GFW head Jeff Jarrett joined the Bullet Club on August 10. On December 7, during a Bullet Club post-match assault on Tomoaki Honma, NJPW veteran tag team Tencozy (Hiroyoshi Tenzan and Satoshi Kojima) stormed into the ring to the aid of Honma, driving the Bullet Club away. They then joined Honma to challenge the stable to a six-man tag team match at Wrestle Kingdom 9. Bad Luck Fale, Yujiro Takahashi and Jeff Jarrett—making his NJPW ring debut—were scheduled to represent the Bullet Club at the event.

== Event ==
=== Pre-show ===
The pre-show featured one match, the New Japan Rumble. Tiger Mask and Yuji Nagata began the match, with new wrestlers entering each minute. Wrestlers worked to eliminate each other, and the last remaining wrestler won. In this match, eliminations could occur via pinfall, submission, disqualification, or being thrown out of the ring over the top rope. The Great Kabuki, Yoshiaki Fujiwara, and Hiro Saito were surprise entrants. Captain New Japan was the first eliminated when Tama Tonga threw him over the top rope. Sho Tanaka and Yohei Komatsu worked together to eliminate Taichi and Tiger Mask. After Tanaka was eliminated by submitting to Manabu Nakanishi's torture rack, Tonga eliminated Nakanishi and Komatsu via pinfall, the latter after a jumping DDT. Yoshi-Hashi threw Tonga over the top rope for the elimination, leaving himself and Nagata in the match. Nagata won the match by slamming Hashi against the mat with a belly-to-back suplex, bridging into a pinfall elimination at 26 minutes and 9 seconds.

=== Undercard ===
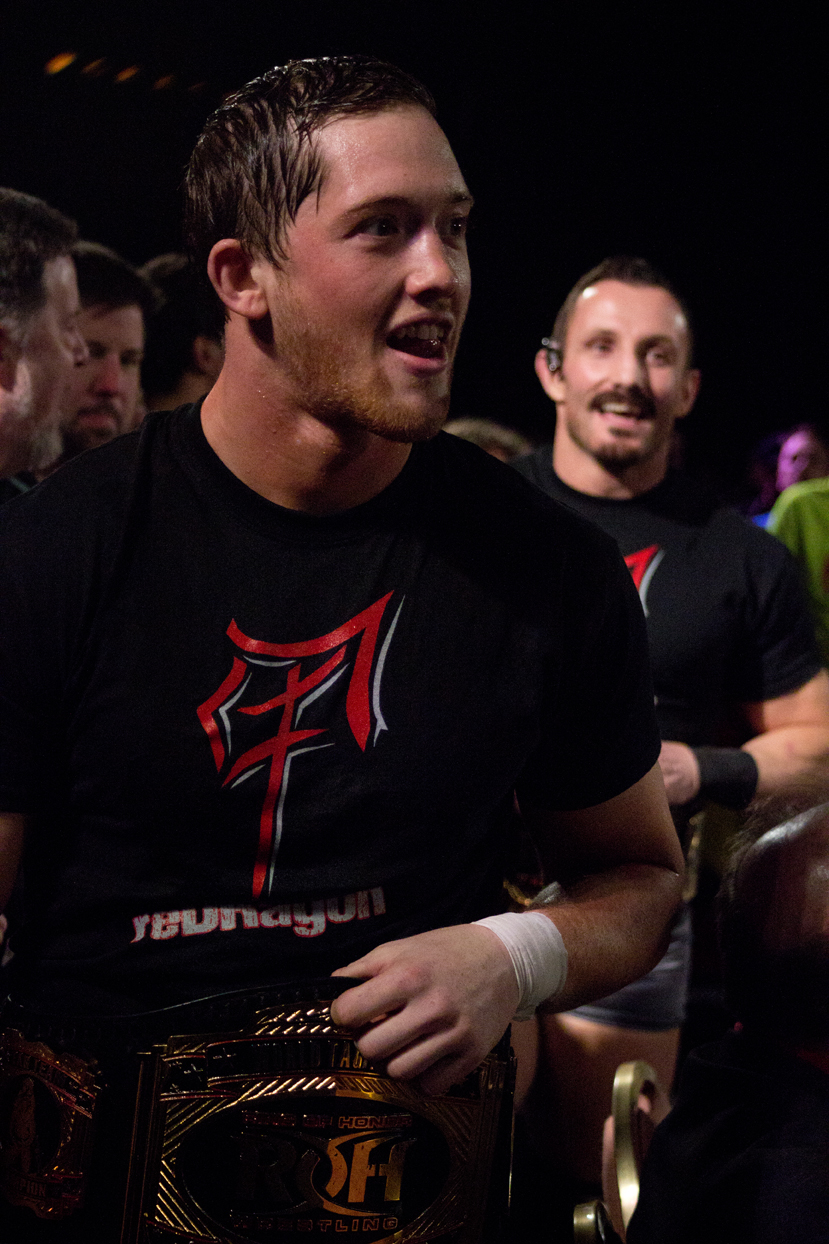
reDRagon (Kyle O'Reilly [front] and Bobby Fish [back]), who defended the IWGP Junior Heavyweight Tag Team Championship at Wrestle Kingdom 9

The first match of the PPV show saw reDRagon (Kyle O'Reilly and Bobby Fish) defending the IWGP Junior Heavyweight Tag Team Championship against Forever Hooligans (Alex Koslov and Rocky Romero), Time Splitters (Alex Shelley and Kushida), and the Young Bucks (Matt Jackson and Nick Jackson). Romero performed the Forever Clothesline (multiple corner clotheslines) and double clotheslines on his opponents. A series of dives out of the ring culminated in Kushida diving from the turnbuckles onto his opponents on the floor. Although Time Splitters followed with a neckbreaker-moonsault combination on Nick, the three-count for a pinfall was stopped at two. The Young Bucks started a Superkick Party (multiple superkicks) and continued with a Meltzer Driver (assisted Tombstone piledriver) on Koslov, but the pin was again broken up. ReDRagon took over with a backbreaker and diving knee drop on Shelley, a double arm DDT and wheelbarrow suplex on Matt, and a super falcon arrow by Fish on Nick. The first Chasing the Dragon kick/brainbuster combination attempt was countered by an inside cradle by Koslov for a two count, but the second Chasing the Dragon attempt succeeded; O'Reilly pinned Koslov to retain the title at 13 minutes and 1 second.

In the second match, the Bullet Club's Bad Luck Fale, Jeff Jarrett, and Yujiro Takahashi faced New Japan's Hiroyoshi Tenzan, Satoshi Kojima, and Tomoaki Honma. Takahashi received a Jarrett guitar shot meant for Honma, a 3D from Tencozy, and a Kokeshi diving headbutt from Honma before Honma pinned him for the victory at 5 minutes and 35 seconds.

The third match saw Suzuki-gun's Davey Boy Smith Jr., Lance Archer, Shelton Benjamin, and Takashi Iizuka opposing Toru Yano and Pro Wrestling Noah representatives Naomichi Marufuji, Mikey Nicholls, and Shane Haste. Smith's powerbomb of Nicholls, Archer's chokeslam of Haste, and Benjamin's super overhead belly-to-belly throw of Marufuji were not enough for the victory; the opposing team overwhelmed Iizuka with a low blow by Yano, a double-team gorilla press slam by TMDK, and a Tiger Uppercut knee lift by Marufuji. This led to Marufuji scoring a pinfall on Iizuka at 5 minutes and 5 seconds.

The fourth match, between Minoru Suzuki and Kazushi Sakuraba, was conducted under UWFi rules; it would end with a knockout, submission, or referee stoppage. During the match, Sakuraba and Suzuki battled onto the entrance ramp, where Sakuraba used a kimura lock to injure Suzuki's arm. When they returned to the ring, Sakuraba targeted Suzuki's injured arm with kicks, stomps, and a cross armbreaker hold. Suzuki withstood the assault, responding with slaps with his good arm and a running kick to Sakuraba's face. Suzuki applied a rear naked choke, making a judo throw while maintaining the choke (Saka Otoshi). Sakuraba fought the hold until he lost consciousness, at which point the referee stopped the match in favour of Suzuki at 9 minutes and 21 seconds. After the match, the wrestlers shook hands and embraced.

Next, Tomohiro Ishii defended the NEVER Openweight Championship against Togi Makabe. Clotheslines, forearms, shoulder blocks, slaps, headbutts, sledgehammers, powerslams, powerbombs, and German suplexes were exchanged. Makabe won the match (and the title) with a running lariat and the King Kong Knee Drop from the top rope, followed by a pinfall at 12 minutes and 23 seconds.

In the sixth match, Ryusuke Taguchi defended the IWGP Junior Heavyweight Championship against Kenny Omega of the Bullet Club. Distractions by the Bullet Club's Young Bucks allowed Omega to spray Taguchi in the eyes with an aerosol can and broke Taguchi's ankle lock on Omega later in the match. Omega captured the championship after a snap dragon suplex, a bicycle knee strike, and the One Winged Angel (electric chair dropped into a one-handed driver), pinning the champion at 13 minutes and 20 seconds.

The final tag team match of the event, the IWGP Tag Team Championship, pitted the Bullet Club's Karl Anderson and Doc Gallows against challengers Meiyu Tag (Hirooki Goto and Katsuyori Shibata). The champions controlled Goto early in the match, but after Goto tagged in Shibata, all four men battled in the ring. At the end of the match, Anderson was kicked off the ring apron by Shibata; this led to a pinfall on Gallows after a double-team GTS and Shibata's Penalty Kick, giving Meiyu Tag the title after 9 minutes.

The eighth match was between A.J. Styles and Tetsuya Naito. Although Styles twice attempted his signature Styles Clash, Naito countered and Styles then focused on attacking Naito's left leg. Styles later applied the Calf Killer, forcing Naito to grab the rope to break the hold. After another Styles Clash attempt, Naito countered by throwing Styles over the top rope to the floor. When Styles returned to the ring after a 19 count (NJPW employs a 20 count in their matches), Naito attempted a top-rope huracanrana. Styles blocked it, converting it to a Styles Clash from the second rope before pinning Naito for another Bullet Club victory at 14 minutes and 25 seconds.

=== Main event matches ===
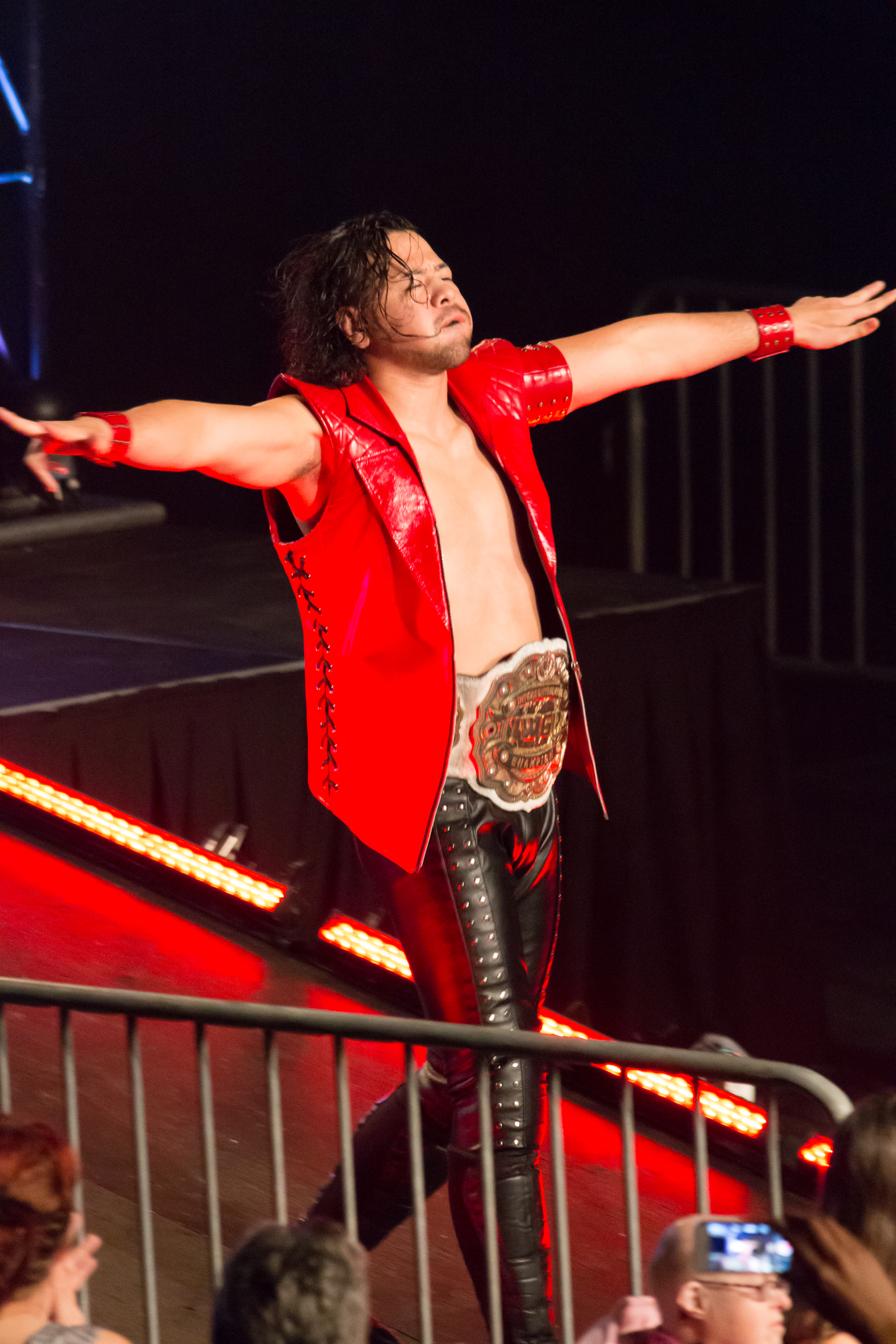
Shinsuke Nakamura defended the IWGP Intercontinental Championship at the event.

Wrestle Kingdom 9 featured two main event matches. In the first, Shinsuke Nakamura defended the IWGP Intercontinental Championship against Kota Ibushi. Ibushi ridiculed Nakamura and used several of the champion's moves, including the corner vibration boot, the reverse powerslam, and the Boma Ye knee strike. Nakamura, responding aggressively, kicked out of the latter at one. Nakamura used a variety of knee-based strikes, and Ibushi's attacks included a standing corkscrew moonsault, a roundhouse kick, an elevated sit-out powerbomb, and a double stomp to the chest. Ibushi also jumped on the top rope, grabbing Nakamura on the apron, and German-suplexed him back into the ring for a two count. In the finishing sequence, Ibushi got up immediately after receiving a knee from the second rope to the back of his head; both attempted the Boma Ye, but Nakamura recovered first with the Landslide and then the Boma Ye knee to retain the title at 20 minutes and 12 seconds. After the match, the wrestlers bumped fists.

In the second main event, Hiroshi Tanahashi defended the IWGP Heavyweight Championship against Kazuchika Okada. The challenger controlled the early match with a hanging DDT onto the floor, a Heavy Rain (Death Valley driver) on the entrance ramp, and the D.I.D. submission. After they battled on the top rope, Tanahashi missed a High Fly Flow but countered Okada's Rainmaker. The momentum shifted to Tanahashi as he performed a dragon screw legwhip and continued attacking Okada's leg. Tanahashi later dove off the top rope and over the guard rail with a High Fly Flow crossbody to Okada on the floor outside of the ring. After Tanahashi tried another High Fly Flow crossbody back in the ring, Okada rolled through for a Tombstone piledriver, which Tanahashi countered with his own Tombstone. Although Tanahashi landed a High Fly Flow to Okada's back and a traditional High Fly Flow frog splash, Okada kicked out at two for a nearfall.

Tanahashi next tried a Rainmaker, which Okada countered with one of his own and scored a nearfall. Although Okada attempted the Rainmaker three more times, Tanahashi countered with a bridging straitjacket German suplex, a bridging dragon suplex, a series of dragon-screw legwhips, and three High Fly Flows. The first was a crossbody while Okada was on the ropes; the second a frog splash to a seated Okada, and the third another frog splash, after which Tanahashi scored a pinfall on Okada to retain the title at 30 minutes and 57 seconds. Okada wept as he left the ring, and Tanahashi shouted that his opponent had a long way to go before becoming the New Japan ace. Tanahashi closed the show, thanking the fans and performing his air guitar routine.

== Reception ==
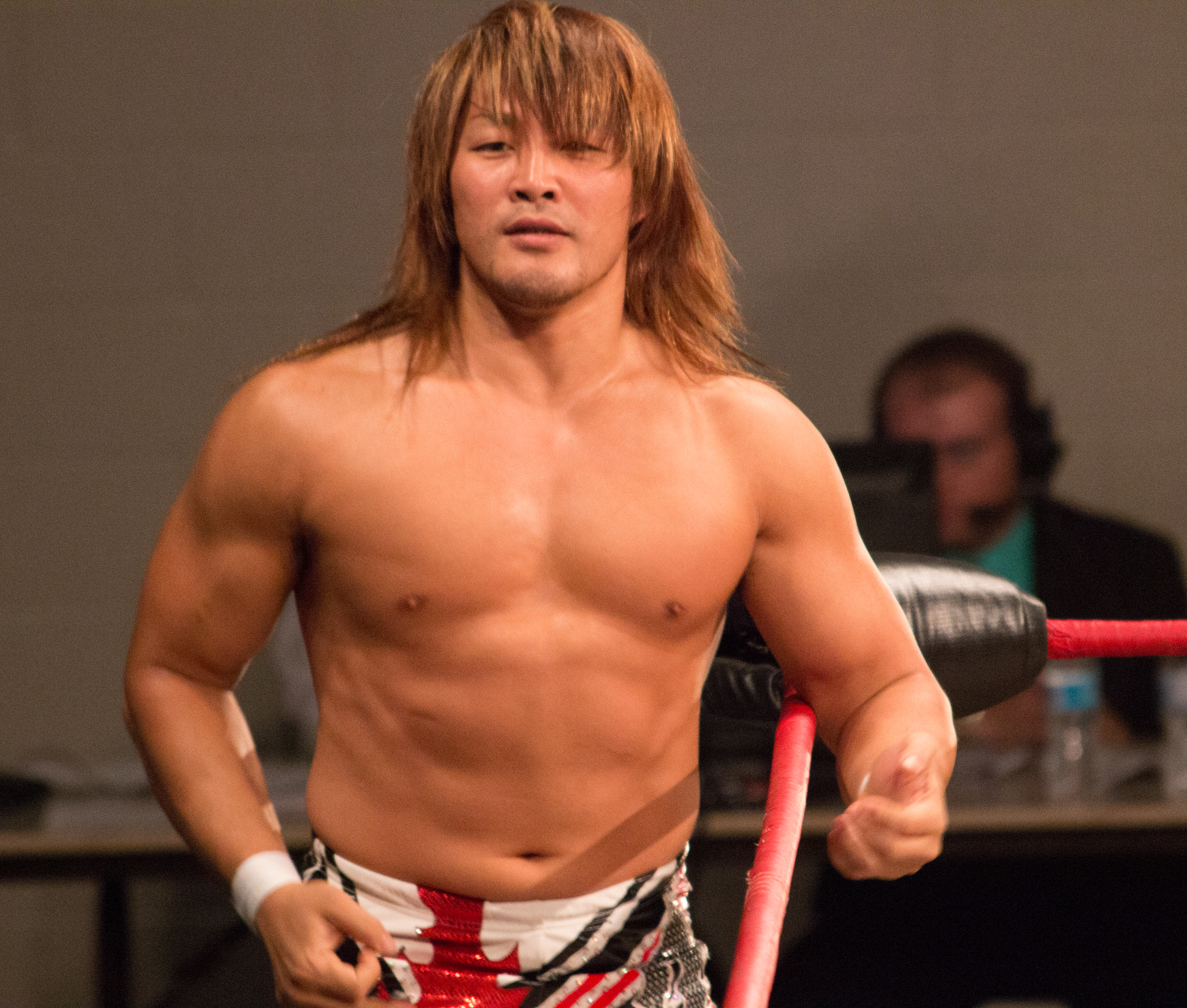
Hiroshi Tanahashi was called "Mr. Tokyo Dome" for his success at the annual January 4 Tokyo Dome Show.

Wrestle Kingdom 9 drew 36,000 fans to the Tokyo Dome, reportedly (accordingly to Wrestleview.com and the Wrestling Observer Newsletter) the best attendance for a NJPW January 4 Tokyo Dome Show in 13 years. The event reportedly had 12,000 to 15,000 purchases in North America.

Kobe Shimbun's "Daily Sports Online" called Tanahashi "Mr. Tokyo Dome" for winning his fifth consecutive Wrestle Kingdom main event in the arena. Jason Namako of Wrestleview.com, who watched the Japanese version of the show via New Japan World, said that the event "proved one thing, puroresu is, beyond a shadow of doubt, indeed ichiban!!" (Note: ichiban is Japanese for being number one.) Meanwhile, Aaron Oster of The Baltimore Sun wrote that "Wrestle Kingdom 9 has to be considered a success".

Bob Kapur of Slam! Wrestling wrote that the show was "too good to miss", "even if you're not a Japanese wrestling fan", with the positives being in-ring action, commentary and production levels, and "perhaps the only negative comment were some technical issues" with his Rogers' HD PPV feed failing. James Caldwell of the Pro Wrestling Torch Newsletter also concurred that the show was a "must-see". As well as a "fantastic opening video package running down the card", the NEVER Openweight Championship match received four out of five stars as a "fantastic match taking the Tokyo Dome to the next level." The IWGP Intercontinental Championship match received four-and-a-half stars: "... a big-time match on a big-time stage, and Ibushi looked the part of a big-time player". The IWGP Heavyweight Championship match received five stars, with Caldwell stating, "There's nothing better in the industry than these two on a big stage in a big-time main event. Just the world's best."

According to Garrett Martin of the magazine Paste, Wrestle Kingdom 9 "easily could wind up being the best [wrestling show of the year] when the year is done". He praised Jim Ross, whose "timeless voice cut through the language barrier" for American wrestling fans, and likened his commentary to "reading the first English translation of Homer." Martin commented on the ending of the show, stating that a "broken Kazuchika Okada shambling tearfully back towards the locker room ... made the moment feel real" which displayed that "Okada isn't just a great athlete but a better actor than most who step into the ring, and elevating the entire scripted, choreographed display into something beyond a sport." Martin wrote that New Japan had transcended puroresu and has produced "some of the most passionate and poignant performance art today."

Jason Powell of Pro Wrestling Dot Net predicted that even first-time viewers of New Japan would be "thrilled" watching this event. Although the "first half of the night felt rushed and had too many tag matches", the show still held his "interest from start to finish" and its final three matches were "amazing". Powell described several matches as overtaking each other as the night's best as the event progressed: the "very physical" Ishii–Makabe, then Naito–Styles, then Ibushi–Nakamura. English-language commentators Ross and Striker were endorsed as an overall positive. Lastly, Powell thought the "pay-per-view broadcast is fantastic", but he also said some Pro Wrestling Dot Net readers "reported issues with the Flipps app [broadcast] feed for the show.

In his review, Vaughn Johnson of the Philadelphia Media Network through Philly.com wrote: "Everything that was presented to the worldwide audience was simple and didn't require anyone to know the Japanese language. Good, quality wrestling is a universal language, and I got the message New Japan sent Sunday loud and clear." According to Johnson, some viewers were "exposed to a product for the first time where the outcomes of the matches are still important, as Okada showed by openly crying after his loss to Tanahashi" in a main event, which was "just as much a spectacle as it was a fantastic match athletic exhibition." He wrote that to call the Nakamura–Ibushi match "physical would be a gross understatement ... It was brutal to watch at times" but "one of the best" he had ever seen. Johnson praised the event as "devoid of popcorn matches and silly gimmicks that insult your intelligence", and commentators Ross and Striker for focusing "on the action in the ring and the significance of it instead of cracking jokes and making a million plugs."

According to the Wrestling Observer Newsletter, although several early matches were "rushed", the final two were candidates for "match of the year". Readers of the publication voted Wrestle Kingdom 9 the Best Major Wrestling Show of 2015; they also named the match between Ibushi and Nakamura the 2015 Pro Wrestling Match of the Year, and the match between Okada and Tanahashi was voted the fourth best of 2015. Dave Meltzer gave commentary for the result in January 2016, describing Wrestle Kingdom 9 as "the blow away show of" 2015 and "the peak show of the rise of New Japan Pro-Wrestling from very low levels for much of the late 00s".

The Nakamura-Ibushi match finished first in the 2015 Voices of Wrestling Match of the Year poll. The Tanahashi-Okada match finished second.

== Aftermath ==
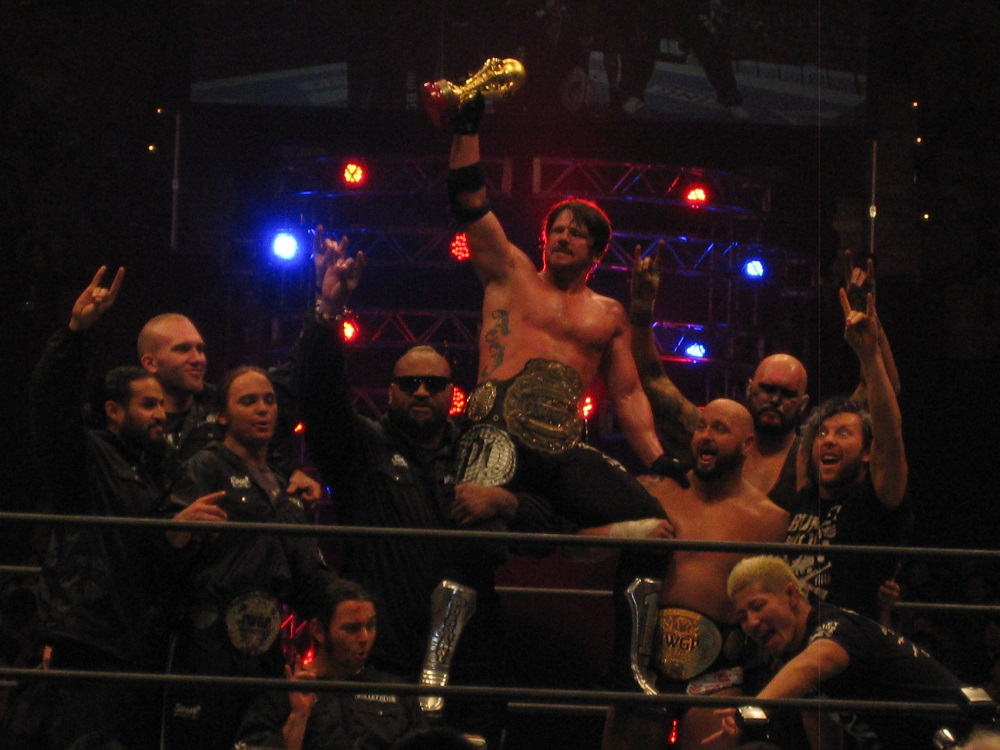
Bullet Club won three championships at NJPW The New Beginning in Osaka.

According to commentator Jim Ross, Japanese television producer TV Asahi did not contact the English-language team during the event; he and Striker announced "by our instincts and it seemed to work out pretty well". Ross also said, "Time will tell but if this was my last pro wrestling event, I picked a damn good one on which to go out on."

In the wake of his loss to Hiroshi Tanahashi in the main event, Kazuchika Okada entered a "downward spiral" storyline with three quick losses to Bad Luck Fale. The day after his win over Tetsuya Naito, A.J. Styles emerged as the next challenger for the IWGP Heavyweight Championship by pinning Tanahashi in an eight-man tag team match. Styles then defeated Tanahashi for the championship on February 11 at NJPW The New Beginning in Osaka. Bullet Club captured two more titles in that event, with the Young Bucks winning the IWGP Junior Heavyweight Tag Team Championship, and Doc Gallows and Karl Anderson defeating Hirooki Goto and Katsuyori Shibata in a rematch from Wrestle Kingdom 9 to regain the IWGP Tag Team Championship. Okada's slump ended on April 5 at NJPW Invasion Attack 2015, where he defeated Fale, which he followed with a victory over Styles on July 5 at NJPW Dominion 7.5 in Osaka-jo Hall to win the IWGP Heavyweight Championship.

Another rematch from Wrestle Kingdom 9 was scheduled for February 14 at NJPW The New Beginning in Sendai between Togi Makabe and Tomohiro Ishii for the NEVER Openweight Championship. When Makabe was sidelined with influenza, NJPW stripped him of the title and scheduled another match, in which Ishii defeated Tomoaki Honma for the now-vacant title. Ishii and Makabe had their title rematch on April 29, when Makabe regained the NEVER Openweight Championship.

Wrestle Kingdom 9 broke Yuji Nagata's streak of consecutive January 4 Tokyo Dome Show appearances at 21 by being featured on the pre-show instead of the main card. In an interview, Nagata said that he felt slighted and thought about quitting when he was relegated to the pre-show. The day after the event, he was scheduled to challenge Shinsuke Nakamura for the IWGP Intercontinental Championship, returning to the IWGP main-event picture for the first time in years. Although Nagata received his title shot at NJPW The New Beginning in Sendai, he was defeated by Nakamura. Nakamura's Wrestle Kingdom 9 opponent, Kota Ibushi, won the 2015 New Japan Cup tournament on March 15 by defeating Hirooki Goto in the finals, thus earning the right to choose a championship to challenge. Ibushi picked a match with A.J. Styles for the IWGP Heavyweight Championship (leaving Goto to challenge Nakamura). Ibushi failed in his title challenge on April 5 at NJPW Invasion Attack 2015, and Goto defeated Nakamura on May 3 at NJPW Wrestling Dontaku 2015 to become IWGP Intercontinental Champion.

After Wrestle Kingdom 9, Suzuki-gun declared war on Pro Wrestling Noah because Naomichi Marufuji and TMDK helped Toru Yano. This storyline angle appeared at the January 10 Noah event, when Suzuki-gun attacked Marufuji and TMDK at the end of the show. After the event, the eight Suzuki-gun members began working for Noah, and by March 15, the group established its dominance by winning all four of Noah's championships: Suzuki became the GHC Heavyweight Champion, Killer Elite Squad the GHC Tag Team Champions, Taichi the GHC Junior Heavyweight Champion, and El Desperado and Taka Michinoku the GHC Junior Heavyweight Tag Team Champions.

A year later, at Wrestle Kingdom 10, Okada defeated Tanahashi to retain the IWGP Heavyweight title; Nakamura beat Styles to retain the IWGP Intercontinental title; Honma and Makabe defeated Anderson and Gallows to capture the IWGP Tag Team title; Kushida beat Kenny Omega to capture the IWGP Junior Heavyweight title; the Young Bucks won a four-way match for the IWGP Junior Heavyweight Tag Team title; Goto defeated Naito in a non-title match; Shibata defeated Ishii to capture the NEVER Openweight title; while Toru Yano and the Briscoes triumphed over Bad Luck Fale, Tama Tonga, and Yujiro Takahashi to become the inaugural NEVER Openweight 6-Man Tag Team Champions.

== Results ==
No.	Results	Stipulations	Times
1^{P}	Yuji Nagata won by last eliminating Yoshi-Hashi	15-man New Japan Rumble	26:09
2	reDRagon (Bobby Fish and Kyle O'Reilly) (c) defeated Forever Hooligans (Alex Koslov and Rocky Romero), Time Splitters (Alex Shelley and Kushida), and The Young Bucks (Matt Jackson and Nick Jackson)	Four-way tag team match for the IWGP Junior Heavyweight Tag Team Championship	13:01
3	Hiroyoshi Tenzan, Satoshi Kojima, and Tomoaki Honma defeated Bullet Club (Bad Luck Fale, Jeff Jarrett, and Yujiro Takahashi) (with Karen Jarrett and Scott D'Amore)	Six-man tag team match	05:35
4	Naomichi Marufuji, TMDK (Mikey Nicholls and Shane Haste), and Toru Yano defeated Suzuki-gun (Davey Boy Smith Jr., Lance Archer, Shelton X Benjamin, and Takashi Iizuka)	Eight-man tag team match	05:05
5	Minoru Suzuki defeated Kazushi Sakuraba	Singles match which could only end by knockout, submission, or referee stoppage	09:21
6	Togi Makabe defeated Tomohiro Ishii (c)	Singles match for the NEVER Openweight Championship	12:23
7	Kenny Omega (with The Young Bucks) defeated Ryusuke Taguchi (c)	Singles match for the IWGP Junior Heavyweight Championship	13:20
8	Meiyu Tag (Hirooki Goto and Katsuyori Shibata) defeated Bullet Club (Doc Gallows and Karl Anderson) (c) (with Amber O'Neal and Tama Tonga)	Tag team match for the IWGP Tag Team Championship	09:00
9	A.J. Styles defeated Tetsuya Naito	Singles match	14:25
10	Shinsuke Nakamura (c) defeated Kota Ibushi	Singles match for the IWGP Intercontinental Championship	20:12
11	Hiroshi Tanahashi (c) defeated Kazuchika Okada	Singles match for the IWGP Heavyweight Championship	30:57
(c) / – the champion(s) heading into the match; P / – the match was broadcast on the pre-show

New Japan Rumble details

Results
Entry		Elimination		
Order	Name	Order	By	Time
1	Tiger Mask	9	Komatsu & Tanaka	23:11
2	Yuji Nagata	—	—	Winner
3	Taichi	7	Komatsu & Tanaka	21:40
4	Taka Michinoku	4	Fujiwara	20:15
5	El Desperado	3	Mask & Taichi	12:13
6	Jyushin Thunder Liger	2	Mask & Taichi	12:12
7	Sho Tanaka	10	Nakanishi	23:28
8	Hiro Saito	8	Multiple wrestlers	22:20
9	Yohei Komatsu	12	Tonga	24:05
10	Captain New Japan	1	Tonga	11:28
11	Tama Tonga	13	Yoshi-Hashi	24:30
12	Yoshi-Hashi	14	Nagata	26:09
13	Manabu Nakanishi	11	Tonga	23:38
14	Yoshiaki Fujiwara	6	Multiple wrestlers	21:10
15	The Great Kabuki	4	Disqualification	20:15
