= Togi Makabe =

Japanese professional wrestler

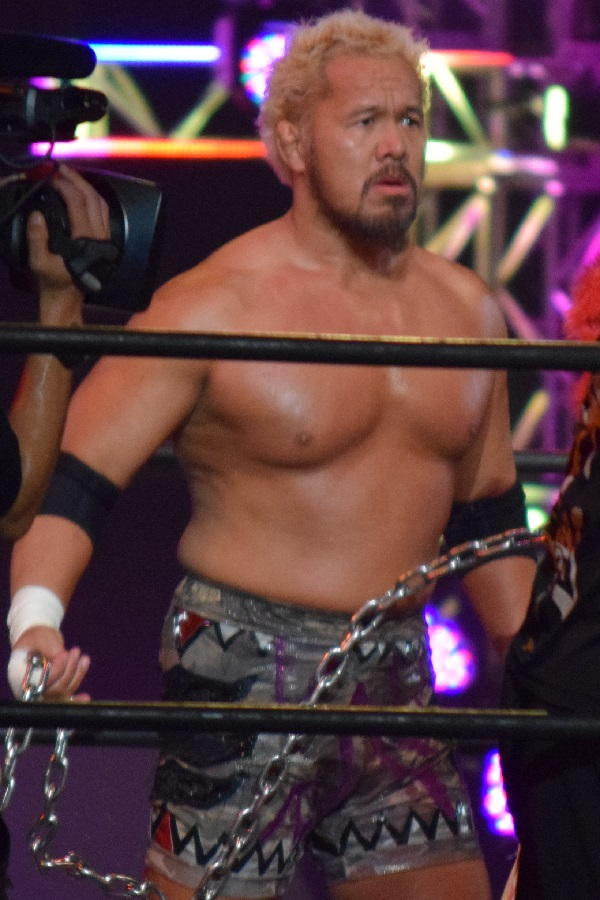
- Makabe in 2017

Personal information
- Born: Shinya Makabe; September 29, 1972 (age 53) Sagamihara, Kanagawa

Professional wrestling career
- Ring name(s): Shinya Makabe; Togi Makabe; SweetGorilla Maruyama
- Billed height: 1.81 m (5 ft 11 in)
- Billed weight: 110 kg (243 lb)
- Trained by: Joe Daigo; NJPW Dojo; Shinjiro Otani
- Debut: February 15, 1997

Shinya Makabe (真壁 伸也, Makabe Shin'ya; born September 29, 1972), better known by his ring name Togi Makabe (真壁 刀義, Makabe Tōgi) is a Japanese professional wrestler, trained by and performing for New Japan Pro-Wrestling (NJPW), where he is a former one-time IWGP Heavyweight Champion, two-time IWGP Tag Team Champion, two-time NEVER Openweight Champion and one-time NEVER Openweight 6-Man Tag Team Champion.

Debuting in 1997, Makabe originally wrestled under his birthname as a junior heavyweight (100 kilograms (220 lb), before gaining several kilograms during a global excursion in 2001 and 2002. He changed his given name to "Togi" during the 2004 G1 Climax tournament. His status in New Japan rose significantly in 2007, making it to the finals of the New Japan Cup and the semifinals of the G1 Climax, and challenging Yuji Nagata for the IWGP Heavyweight Championship. After a number of unsuccessful challenges at the title, Makabe finally won the IWGP Heavyweight Championship on May 3, 2010, by defeating Shinsuke Nakamura.

Makabe's wrestling style and character is heavily influenced by the late Bruiser Brody. Known as the "Unchained Gorilla", Makabe is known for his violent, bloody style of wrestling, often illegally employing steel chairs and chains into his offense, including a lariat with a chain wrapped around his arm (like Brody). He also uses Brody's Japan theme "Immigrant Song" (albeit a cover made by Tomoyasu Hotei) as his own.

== Professional wrestling career ==
=== New Japan Pro-Wrestling ===
==== Junior heavyweight division (1997–2001) ====
Pursuing judo while enrolled in Tokyo's Teikyo University, Shinya Makabe passed an NJPW admission test in February 1996 and enrolled in the New Japan dojo in April of that year, training there for ten months. He made his debut the following year, losing to Shinjiro Otani on February 15, 1997. Makabe began wrestling in the undercard, obtaining his first victory 20 months after his debut by defeating Yutaka Yoshie on October 15, 1998. Makabe continued to wrestle in lesser matches through 1999 against other young wrestlers such as Wataru Inoue and Katsuyori Shibata, and defeating future IWGP Heavyweight Champion Hiroshi Tanahashi in his debut match on October 10, 1999.

In April 2000, Makabe entered the Super J-Cup, a 16-man single-elimination tournament held in Michinoku Pro, involving junior heavyweights from a number of different promotions; he was eliminated in the first round by Gran Hamada. Later that month, Makabe also participated in NJPW's Young Lion Cup, a six-man round-robin tournament exclusive to young wrestlers; he finished in first place for the group stage, defeating all of his opponents (Kenzo Suzuki, Hiroshi Tanahashi, Wataru Inoue, Katsuyori Shibata and Masakazu Fukuda by forfeit), though he lost to second-place finisher Kenzo Suzuki in the final. Shinya continued his tournament participation in May and June, entering New Japan's Best of the Super Juniors (BOSJ) round-robin tournament to decide the company's top junior heavyweight wrestler. Makabe finished in last place out of six in Block A, scoring two points by defeating Dr. Wagner, Jr. He later defeated Minoru Fujita, who finished in last place for Block B to determine the tournament's 11th-place finisher, leaving Fujita at #12. Makabe received the first title shot of his career on September 12, 2000, teaming with Jyushin Thunder Liger to unsuccessfully challenge Koji Kanemoto and Minoru Tanaka for the IWGP Junior Heavyweight Tag Team Championship.

Makabe made his debut in the Tokyo Dome, one of the largest venues in Japan, during NJPW's annual event there on January 4, 2001, teaming with Tatsuhito Takaiwa in a loss to Koji Kanemoto and Minoru Tanaka. For the following few months, Makabe began competing amongst heavyweights, even teaming with Riki Choshu to challenge Satoshi Kojima and Hiroyoshi Tenzan for the IWGP World Tag Team Championship, falling to a Kojima lariat. However, he returned to the Best of the Super Juniors tournament in June, finishing in fifth place out of six in his block, earning 4 points by defeating Katsuyori Shibata and AKIRA.

On June 8, 2001, as part of a series of interpromotional matches, Makabe and Yuji Nagata entered All Japan Pro Wrestling (AJPW) to challenge for the vacant All Asia Tag Team Championship, losing to Masahito Kakihara and Mitsuya Nagai. In August 2001, Makabe announced that he would be leaving Japan indefinitely to wrestle overseas in Canada, Great Britain and Puerto Rico. He wrestled his farewell match on August 12, 2001, in a tag team loss with Yutaka Yoshie against Riki Choshu and Kenzo Suzuki. Makabe wrestled in the aforementioned countries for the following 14 months, gaining a considerable amount of muscle.

==== Move to heavyweight division and name change (2002–2006) ====
Makabe returned to New Japan on October 14, 2002 in the Tokyo Dome as a heavyweight, teaming with Minoru Fujita to defeat Kenzo Suzuki and Hiroshi Tanahashi; he continued to team with Fujita and his fellow Kaientai Dojo member Taka Michinoku over the next few tours.

In January 2003, Makabe suspended his contract with NJPW, wrestling under his own terms. Makabe once again wrestled at NJPW's annual Tokyo Dome event on January 4, 2003, competing in the four-man Young Generation Cup tournament, losing in the first round to Yutaka Yoshie. Shinya once again teamed with Minoru Fujita in February 2003, competing in an 8-team tournament to decide the #1 contenders to the IWGP Tag Team Championship; they were eliminated in the first round by Tatsutoshi Goto and Hiro Saito. Regardless, Makabe challenged for the belts with a different partner, Yoshihiro Takayama, on March 9, 2003, losing to champions Masahiro Chono and Hiroyoshi Tenzan. Around the same time, Makabe participated in the G2 U-30 Climax, a round-robin tournament featuring only wrestlers under the age of 30 (although Makabe was already 31) to decide the first IWGP U-30 Openweight Champion. Makabe finished in first place out of five in Block A, defeating Hiroshi Tanahashi, Masahito Kakihara and Dan Devine, and losing to Makai #2. He would go on to defeat Blue Wolf in the semifinals before losing to Hiroshi Tanahashi in the final on April 23, 2003.

On July 1, 2003, Makabe travelled to Pro Wrestling Noah, teaming with Yoshihiro Takayama and NOAH's Takashi Sugiura to defeat Jun Akiyama, Akitoshi Saito and Makoto Hashi. He and Takayama would go on to challenge Kenta Kobashi and Tamon Honda for the GHC Tag Team Championship, Makabe getting pinned after a Kobashi lariat. Makabe continued to wrestle mid- and uppercard wrestlers in NJPW throughout 2003 and much of 2004, before making his first appearance in New Japan's annual G1 Climax heavyweight tournament, changing his name to Togi Makabe and defeating Mitsuya Nagai on August 7, 2004 to gain entrance into the competition. Makabe finished in seventh out of eight in his block with four points, defeating Osamu Nishimura by pinfall and Yoshihiro Takayama by forfeit.

Makabe again participated in the G1 Climax in August 2005, though he was in only two matches before tearing his achilles tendon in a match against Shinsuke Nakamura. Makabe was forced to forfeit the rest of his matches due to the injury, finishing with zero points and taking him out of action for five months. He returned on January 8, 2006, teaming with Toru Yano in a losing effort against Osamu Nishimura and Naofumi Yamamoto. Makabe entered the second annual New Japan Cup in April 2006, defeating Tatsutoshi Goto in the first round before losing to Yuji Nagata in the quarterfinals.

On July 2, 2006, Makabe teamed with Shiro Koshinaka in a one-night tournament to crown the interim IWGP Tag Team Champions, after primary champions Masahiro Chono and Hiroyoshi Tenzan became inactive. The duo defeated the teams of Yuji Nagata and Naofumi Yamamoto and Giant Bernard and Travis Tomko to win the interim title; the reign would be short-lived however, as Koshinaka and Makabe would lose the title to Manabu Nakanishi and Takao Omori just 15 days later.

Makabe entered the 2006 G1 Climax in August, finishing with three points in his block with a win over Naofumi Yamamoto and a double count out against Yuji Nagata. On September 24, 2006, Makabe entered Apache Pro-Wrestling Army, defeating Kintaro Kanemura on their third anniversary show to revive the WEW Heavyweight Championship, the first official Japanese title of his career.

==== Great Bash Heel (2006–2010) ====
On October 2, 2006, Hiroyoshi Tenzan announced a new faction featuring himself, Makabe and Shiro Koshinaka, naming it Great Bash Heel (GBH) shortly afterward; Toru Yano and Tomohiro Ishii, who had been feuding with Makabe and Koshinaka, also joined the group. Makabe teamed with Koshinaka in the G1 Tag League later that month, finishing in last place in their block out of five, ending with two points via a victory over eventual winners Masahiro Chono and Shinsuke Nakamura.

Makabe entered another tag team tournament in November, the National Area Tag League, in which teams were organized by home region; Makabe teamed with Gedo, representing the Kantō region. They lost both of their matches in Block D, falling to Hiroshi Tanahashi and Naofumi Yamamoto of Kansai as well as Milano Collection AT and Prince Devitt, representing Hokkaidō. On November 18, 2006, Makabe made his first defense of the WEW title on New Japan's LOCK UP brand, defeating Kintaro Kanemura in a rematch. Makabe and Koshinaka teamed once again on December 10, 2006, unsuccessfully challenging the interpromotional team of Manabu Nakanishi and Pro Wrestling Zero1's Takao Omori for the official IWGP Tag Team title after losing the interim title in July.

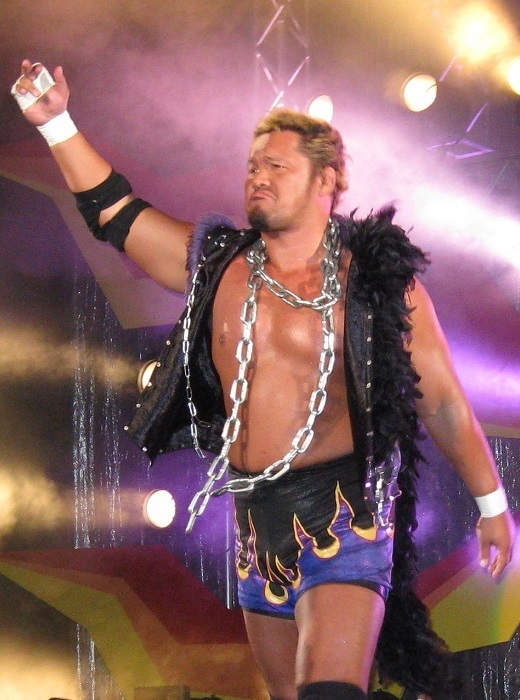
Makabe in August 2008

Makabe teamed with GBH allies Yano and Ishii on January 4, 2007, at Wrestle Kingdom in Tokyo Dome, defeating Travis Tomko and AJPW's D'Lo Brown and Buchanan. Four days later, Makabe retained the WEW title against Tetsuhiro Kuroda at an event co-produced by Apache Pro and Takashi Sasaki; he would defend the championship for a third time on February 4, 2007 at LOCK UP's first show in Korakuen Hall, defeating Mammoth Sasaki in a cage death match. On February 18, 2007, Makabe faced and lost to Shinsuke Nakamura in a match pitting GBH against Nakamura and Masahiro Chono's BLACK faction, subtitled "SANCTIONS". Makabe again entered the New Japan Cup in March 2007, making it to the finals with victories over Travis Tomko and Takashi Iizuka by pinfall and Hiroyoshi Tenzan by disqualification, before losing to Yuji Nagata in the final. On April 8, 2007, Makabe faced Nakamura in a rematch of their February contest, defeating Shinsuke in a chain death match. Makabe made his fourth defense of the WEW title on April 15, 2007 in Apache Pro, again defeating Mammoth Sasaki. Makabe battled Nakamura for a third time on May 3, 2007 in a match dubbed "Reality or Revenge", winning once more.

On May 20, 2007, GBH battled a BLACK and NJPW seikigun alliance of Yuji Nagata, Riki Choshu, Masahiro Chono, Shinsuke Nakamura and Naofumi Yamamoto; Makabe and Hiroyoshi Tenzan survived, Makabe last eliminating IWGP Heavyweight champion Nagata by pinfall. On June 24, 2007, Makabe lost the WEW Heavyweight Championship in Apache Pro to Kintaro Kanemura in their third meeting. Makabe followed up his pinfall over Nagata in May with a challenge to Nagata's title, his first singles title shot in New Japan, on July 6, 2007 in front of a sold out Korakuen Hall; Nagata won with a backdrop in just under 20 minutes.

Makabe had his strongest showing to date in the G1 Climax in August, finishing first place in his block with six points with pinfall victories over Giant Bernard, Yuji Nagata, and Masahiro Chono before losing in the semifinals to eventual winner Hiroshi Tanahashi. Makabe also made it to the semifinals in the G1 Tag League in November, scoring 8 points with Toru Yano in the tournament's single block by defeating the teams of Yuji Nagata and Manabu Nakanishi, Akebono and Masahiro Chono, and Gedo and Jado, as well as Giant Bernard in a handicap match when his partner Travis Tomko no-showed the event; Bernard and Tomko, the eventual winners, would defeat Makabe and Yano in the semifinals. On December 9, 2007, Makabe and Shinsuke Nakamura faced off in their fourth and final match of the year, this time with the winner receiving a shot at Hiroshi Tanahashi's IWGP Heavyweight title at the Tokyo Dome in January; Nakamura was victorious, tying their series at 2-2.

On January 4, 2008, at Wrestle Kingdom II in Tokyo Dome, fresh off of winning Tokyo Sports' Tag Team of the Year award for 2007, Makabe and Toru Yano were defeated by Total Nonstop Action Wrestling's (TNA) Team 3D (Brother Ray and Brother Devon) as part of an interpromotional card between TNA and NJPW. Makabe and Yano would later defeat Giant Bernard and Travis Tomko for the IWGP Tag Team Championship on February 17, 2008. Earlier in the night, GBH leader Hiroyoshi Tenzan was betrayed and attacked by fellow GBH members Tomohiro Ishii, Jado and Gedo, kicking him out of the faction.

Makabe and Yano made their first title defense on March 9, 2008, retaining over Giant Bernard and Shinsuke Nakamura when interference from both teams' respective factions led to a no contest; as a result the match was stricken from the record, and is not considered an official defense. Later that month, Makabe participated in the New Japan Cup for the third straight year, defeating Takashi Iizuka and ousted GBH leader Hiroyoshi Tenzan in the first two rounds, before falling to eventual winner Hiroshi Tanahashi in the semifinal. Makabe and Tenzan battled the following week in a non-title tag team match, Tenzan and Takashi Iizuka defeating Makabe and Yano when Tenzan pinned Makabe. The two teams battled again, this time for the championship, on April 27, 2008; Makabe and Yano came out on top in their first official defense after Iizuka betrayed Tenzan and allowed the champions to retain, seemingly joining GBH. In August Makabe once again finished first in his block of the G1 Climax tournament and advanced to the finals, where he was defeated by Hirooki Goto, despite interference from Makabe's GBH teammates.

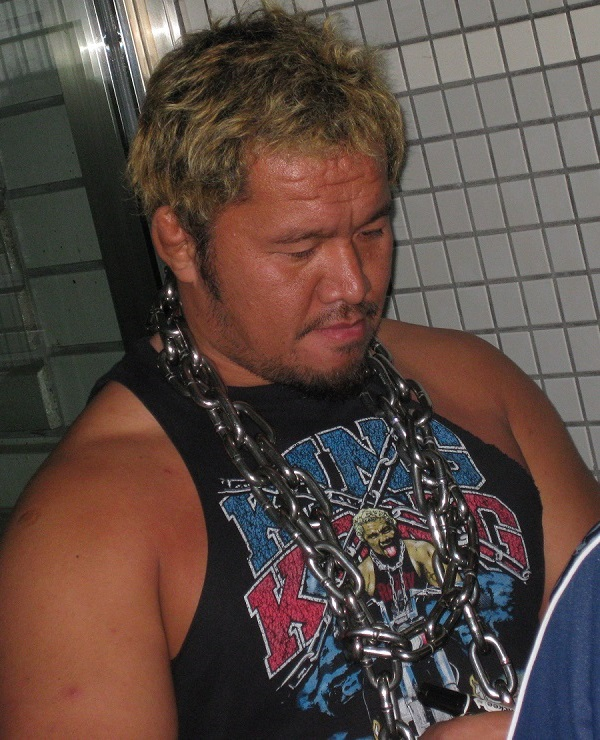
Makabe in December 2010

On January 4, 2009, Makabe and Yano were scheduled to defend the IWGP Tag Team Championship at Wrestle Kingdom III in Tokyo Dome in a three way dance against Team 3D of TNA Wrestling and Satoshi Kojima and Hiroyoshi Tenzan, but an injury to Tenzan turned it into a match between Makabe & Yano and 3D, which 3D won. 3D also won the subsequent rematch a month later. This failure inevitably lead to the Makabe/Yano team dissolving when Yano cost Makabe a match against Shinsuke Nakamura in early April. While Makabe was out due to a head injury suffered at the hands of Yano, most of GBH, Yano included, went on to form CHAOS with Shinsuke Nakamura, leaving Makabe and Tomoaki Honma on their own. In August 2009 Makabe finished first in his block of the G1 Climax tournament for the third year in a row and then defeated Takashi Sugiura and Shinsuke Nakamura to win the entire tournament. After Hiroshi Tanahashi was forced to vacate the IWGP Heavyweight Championship due to an injury, Makabe and Nakamura were booked in a rematch to determine the new champion. Nakamura defeated Makabe with the Boma Ye to become the 53rd champion. At Wrestle Kingdom IV in Tokyo Dome Makabe defeated Muhammad Yone in an interpromotional match between New Japan and Pro Wrestling Noah.

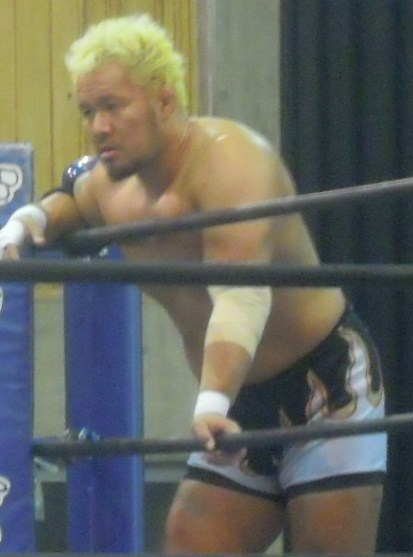
Makabe in November 2011

In January Makabe along with his ally Honma, would compete on Noah's Global Tag League. They only won one match, but Makabe left a huge mark by pinning GHC Heavyweight Champion Takashi Sugiura in a non-tournament tag team match. On February 28, Makabe failed to claim the GHC Heavyweight Championship from Takashi Sugiura at Budokan Hall.

==== IWGP Heavyweight Champion (2010–2012) ====
In March 2010 Makabe entered the 2010 New Japan Cup and defeated Tomohiro Ishii, Toru Yano and Tetsuya Naito to advance to the finals, where he was once again defeated by Hirooki Goto in a rematch of their 2008 G1 Climax final match. After Goto failed in his title match against the IWGP Heavyweight Champion Shinsuke Nakamura, Makabe laid a challenge for the belt and on May 3, 2010, at Wrestling Dontaku 2010, defeated Nakamura to win the IWGP Heavyweight Championship. On June 19 at Dominion 6.19, Makabe made his first successful title defense, defeating Pro Wrestling Noah's Go Shiozaki. On July 19 Makabe successfully defended the IWGP Heavyweight Championship against previous champion Shinsuke Nakamura. The following month Makabe entered the 2010 G1 Climax tournament. After a rocky start, which included losses to Tetsuya Naito and former tag team partner Toru Yano, Makabe came back with a four match winning streak, only to lose to Hiroshi Tanahashi on the final day of the tournament and thus miss advancing to the finals. On October 11 Makabe lost the IWGP Heavyweight Championship to G1 Climax winner, Satoshi Kojima.

During the 2010 G1 Tag League, where he teamed with Tomoaki Honma, Makabe suffered a neck injury in a match against Masato Tanaka and Tomohiro Ishii that would sideline him indefinitely. Makabe and Tanaka would settle their grudge on January 4, 2011, at Wrestle Kingdom V in Tokyo Dome, in a match, where Makabe was victorious. On May 3, Makabe formed a new partnership with Satoshi Kojima, after their match against each other, when the rest of Kojima-gun, aided by the returning Minoru Suzuki, turned on their leader. Later that same month, Makabe took part in New Japan's first ever tour of the United States, the Invasion Tour 2011, during which he feuded with Rhino. Makabe and Rhino main evented the final day of the tour on May 15 at the Asylum Arena, where Makabe was victorious in a South Philadelphia Street Fight. Makabe continued his rivalry with the Suzuki-gun by scoring victories over Taichi, Taka Michinoku and Lance Archer, before being defeated by the group's leader Minoru Suzuki in a grudge match on October 10 at Destruction '11. In the 2011 G1 Tag League, Makabe teamed with Satoshi Kojima as the "Beast Combination". After picking up three wins and one loss in their first four matches, Makabe and Kojima were defeated by the Billion Powers (Hirooki Goto and Hiroshi Tanahashi) on November 4, causing them to narrowly miss advancing to the semifinals of the tournament. In late 2011, Makabe shifted from feuding with Minoru Suzuki to his partner Yoshihiro Takayama, which built to a match on January 4, 2012, at Wrestle Kingdom VI in Tokyo Dome, where Makabe defeated Takayama in a singles match. Makabe's rivalry with Suzuki culminated on June 16 at Dominion 6.16, where Makabe was victorious in a singles grudge match. As a result, Makabe was granted a shot at the IWGP Heavyweight Championship, but he was unable to dethrone the defending champion, Hiroshi Tanahashi, in their title match on July 1. Makabe ended his long rivalry with the Suzuki-gun on September 23 at Destruction, when he defeated the stable's newest member, Kengo Mashimo, in a singles match.

==== Various feuds (2012–2014) ====
With his feud with Suzuki-gun behind him, Makabe began a new feud with the returning Laughter7 team of Katsuyori Shibata and Kazushi Sakuraba, leading to him and Wataru Inoue losing to the two in tag team matches on October 8 at King of Pro-Wrestling and November 11 at Power Struggle. From November 20 to December 1, Makabe and Inoue, billed collectively as "Always Hypers", took part in the round-robin portion of the 2012 World Tag League. The team finished with a record of four wins and two losses, winning their block and advancing to the semifinals of the tournament. On December 2, Makabe and Inoue were eliminated from the tournament in their semifinal match by the reigning IWGP Tag Team Champions, K.E.S. (Davey Boy Smith, Jr. and Lance Archer). The rivalry between Makabe and Katsuyori Shibata built to a grudge match on January 4, 2013, at Wrestle Kingdom 7 in Tokyo Dome, where Makabe was victorious.

The following month, Makabe started a new rivalry with Yujiro Takahashi. The two first met each other in a singles match on February 10 at The New Beginning, where Makabe was victorious. On March 11, Makabe and Takahashi faced off in the first round of the 2013 New Japan Cup in a match, where Takahashi emerged victorious. On March 23, Tomoaki Honma returned to New Japan, aligning himself with Makabe in his war with Takahashi and the rest of Chaos. The reunited GBH had their first match back together on April 7 at Invasion Attack, where they were defeated by Takahashi and Masato Tanaka in a tag team match. Makabe and Takahashi faced off in another singles match on May 3 at Wrestling Dontaku 2013, where Makabe picked up a decisive win. After the main event of the evening, Makabe challenged Kazuchika Okada to a match for the IWGP Heavyweight Championship. Makabe received his title shot on June 22 at Dominion 6.22, but was defeated by Okada. From August 1 to 11, Makabe took part in the 2013 G1 Climax, where he finished with a record of five wins and four losses, with a loss against Prince Devitt on the final day costing him a spot in the finals. Makabe then started feuding with Devitt and his Bullet Club stable. Later in the year, after Devitt began concentrating on defending his IWGP Junior Heavyweight Championship, Makabe made another Bullet Club member, Bad Luck Fale, whose interference had cost him his match against Devitt in the G1 Climax, his main rival. In December, Makabe and Honma made it to the semifinals of the 2013 World Tag League, before being eliminated by the Bullet Club team of Doc Gallows and Karl Anderson, following outside interference from Fale. The rivalry between Makabe and Fale culminated in a King of Destroyer match on January 4, 2014, at Wrestle Kingdom 8 in Tokyo Dome, where Makabe was victorious. Makabe and Fale faced off again on March 15 in the first round of the 2014 New Japan Cup, where Fale was victorious.

==== NEVER Openweight Champion (2014–2015) ====
The following month, Makabe and Hiroshi Tanahashi formed a tag team named "Ace to King" (Japanese for "Ace and King") to go after Bullet Club's IWGP Tag Team Championship. On May 25 at Back to the Yokohama Arena, Makabe and Tanahashi defeated Hirooki Goto and Katsuyori Shibata to earn a shot at the IWGP Tag Team Championship. Makabe and Tanahashi received their title shot on June 21 at Dominion 6.21, but were defeated by Bullet Club's Doc Gallows and Karl Anderson. Makabe then reunited with Tomoaki Honma for the 2014 World Tag League, where the two finished last in their block with a record of three wins and four losses.

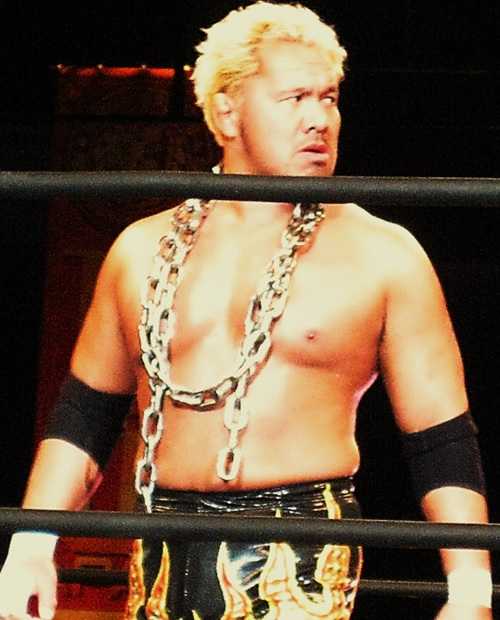
Makabe in March 2015

On January 4, 2015, at Wrestle Kingdom 9 in Tokyo Dome, Makabe defeated Tomohiro Ishii to win the NEVER Openweight Championship for the first time. After coming down with influenza, Makabe was stripped of the title on February 14 due to being unable to wrestle Ishii in a title rematch at The New Beginning in Sendai. After recovering, Makabe defeated Ishii on April 29 at Wrestling Hinokuni to regain the NEVER Openweight Championship. He made his first successful title defense against Ishii on July 5 at Dominion 7.5 in Osaka-jo Hall. From July 20 to August 14, Makabe took part in the 2015 G1 Climax, where he finished in the middle of his block with a record of four wins and five losses. On September 23 at Destruction in Okayama, Makabe made his second successful defense of the NEVER Openweight Championship against Kota Ibushi, who had defeated him during the 2015 G1 Climax. On October 12 at King of Pro-Wrestling, Makabe lost the title back to Ishii.

==== Great Bash Heel reunion (2015–present) ====
In December, Makabe and Honma won their block in the 2015 World Tag League with a record of four wins and two losses, advancing to the finals of the tournament. On December 9, Makabe and Honma defeated Los Ingobernables de Japón (Evil and Tetsuya Naito) in the finals to win the 2015 World Tag League. On January 4, 2016, at Wrestle Kingdom 10 in Tokyo Dome, Makabe and Honma defeated Bullet Club's Doc Gallows and Karl Anderson to win the IWGP Tag Team Championship. They made their first successful title defense on February 14 at The New Beginning in Niigata in a rematch against Gallows and Anderson. They lost the title to Guerrillas of Destiny (Tama Tonga and Tanga Loa) on April 10 at Invasion Attack 2016. From July 18 to August 12, Makabe took part in the 2016 G1 Climax, where he finished with a record of four wins and five losses. In December, Makabe and Honma advanced to the finals of the 2016 World Tag League by winning their block with a record of five wins and two losses. On December 10, Makabe and Honma defeated the reigning IWGP Tag Team Champions Guerrillas of Destiny to win the 2016 World Tag League, becoming the first ever team to win the tournament in two consecutive years. On January 4, 2017, at Wrestle Kingdom 11 in Tokyo Dome, Makabe and Honma took part in a three-way match for the IWGP Tag Team Championship, which was won by Tomohiro Ishii and Toru Yano. On February 21, Makabe celebrated his 20th year as a professional wrestler with a special event promoted by NJPW. In the main event, Makabe and Honma defeated IWGP Tag Team Champions Ishii and Yano in a non-title match.

On January 30, 2019, Makabe, Taguchi and Yano defeated Bullet Club to win the NEVER Openweight 6-Man Tag Team Championship.

== Other media ==
Makabe provided the voice of Rictus Erectus in the Japanese dub of the 2015 film Mad Max: Fury Road. In 2016, Makabe, along with Hiroshi Tanahashi, appeared in Garo: Ashura, the 10th anniversary special of the Japanese tokusatsu series Garo. He also provided the voice for the animated version of himself in the Tiger Mask W anime. Makabe voices a boss character on the Japanese version of the video game Let It Die.

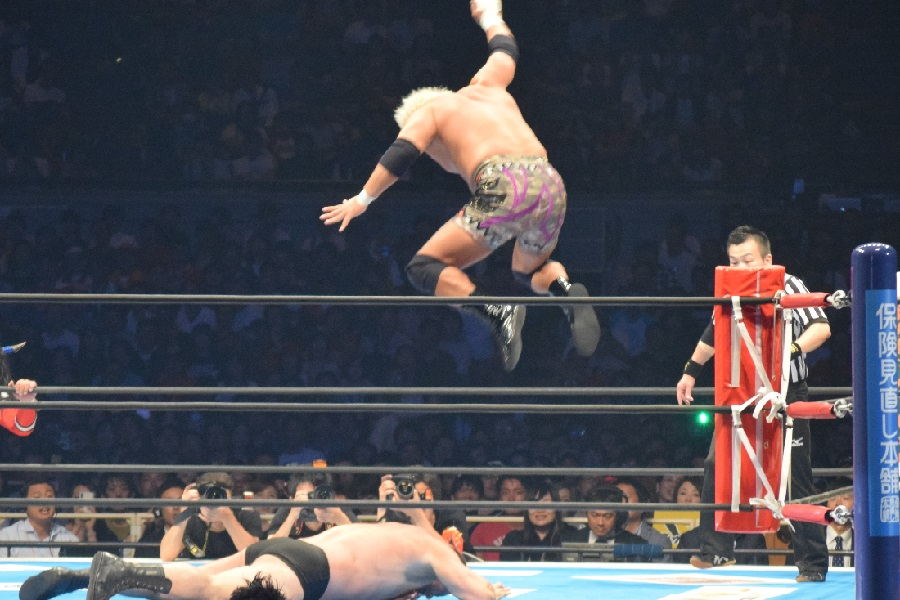
Makabe performing the King Kong Knee Drop on Manabu Nakanishi

== Championships and accomplishments ==
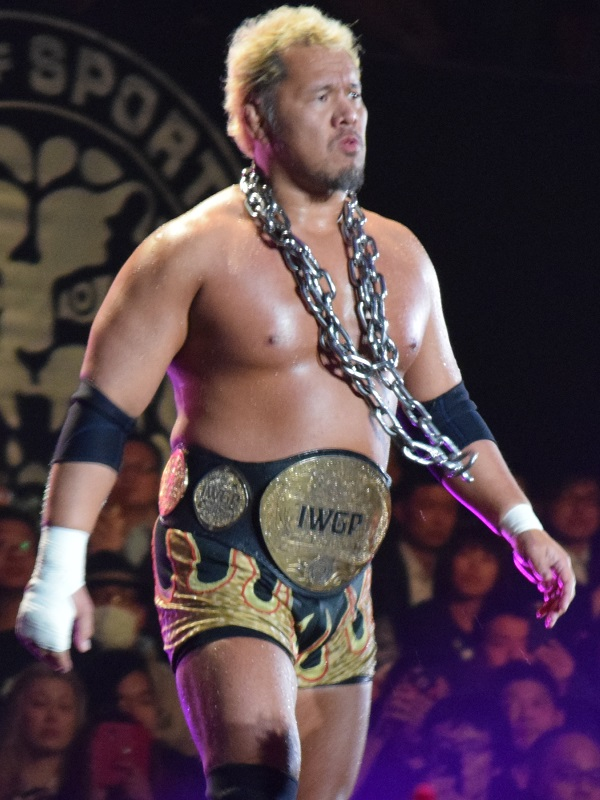
Makabe as one half of the IWGP Tag Team Champions in February 2016

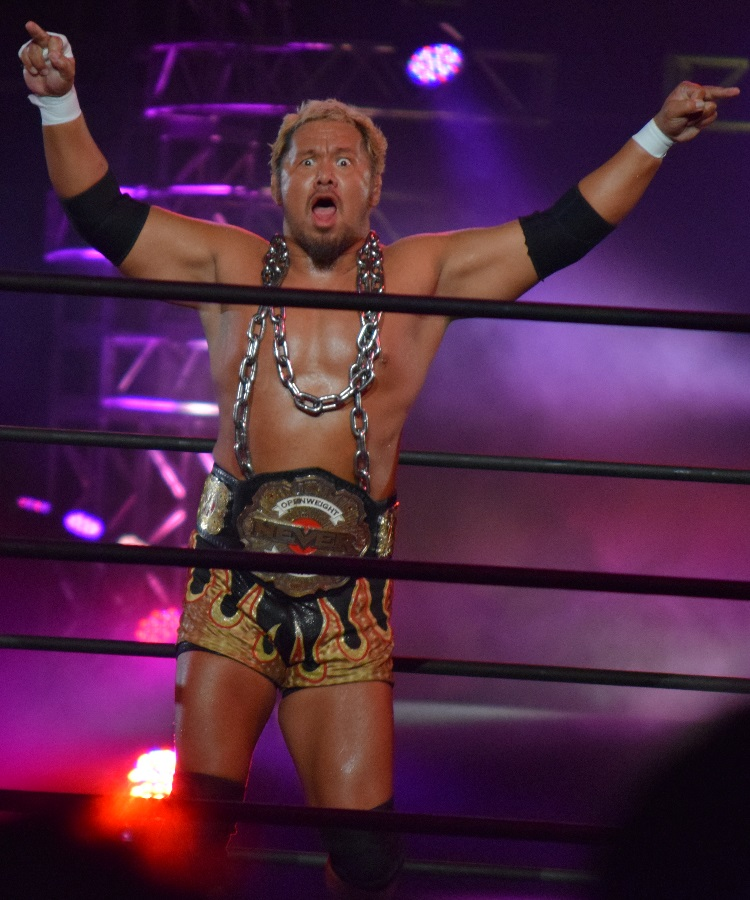
Makabe as the NEVER Openweight Champion in August 2015

- Apache Pro-Wrestling
  - WEW World Heavyweight Championship (1 time)
- New Japan Pro-Wrestling
  - IWGP Heavyweight Championship (1 time)
  - IWGP Tag Team Championship (2 times) – with Toru Yano (1) and Tomoaki Honma (1)
  - NEVER Openweight 6-Man Tag Team Championship (1 time) - with Ryusuke Taguchi and Toru Yano
  - NEVER Openweight Championship (2 times)
  - Interim IWGP Tag Team Championship (1 time) – with Shiro Koshinaka
  - G1 Climax (2009)
  - World Tag League (2015, 2016) – with Tomoaki Honma
- Nikkan Sports
  - Fighting Spirit Award (2010)
- Pro Wrestling Illustrated
  - PWI ranked him #54 of the top 500 singles wrestlers in the PWI 500 in 2011
- Tokyo Sports
  - Best Tag Team Award (2007) with Toru Yano
  - Fighting Spirit Award (2009)
