= Yuji Nagata =

Japanese professional wrestler (born 1968)

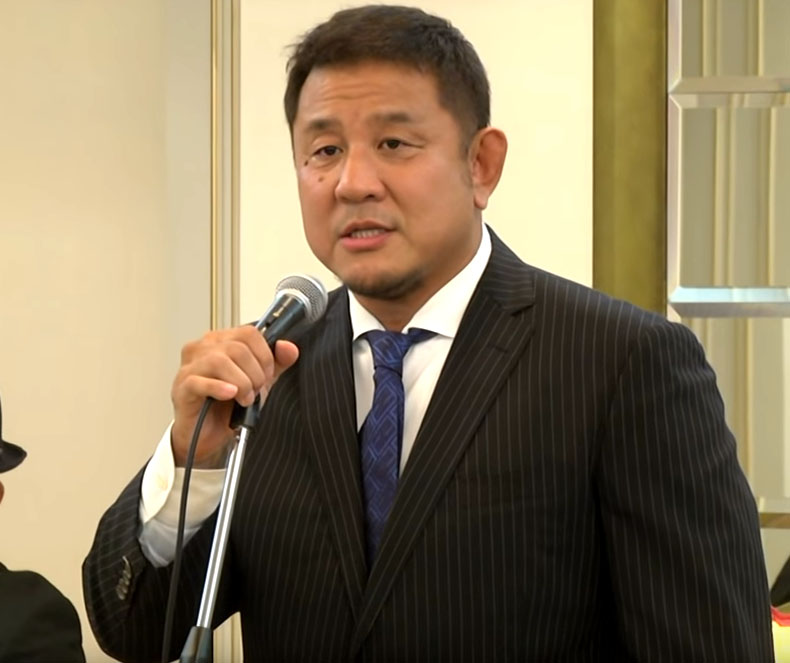
- Nagata in 2017

Personal information
- Born: April 24, 1968 (age 58) Togane, Chiba, Japan
- Spouse: Chieko Yuji (m. 2002)
- Children: 1
- Family: Katsuhiko Nagata (brother)

Professional wrestling career
- Ring name(s): Maybach Blue Justice; Super Strong Machine Justice; Yuji Nagata
- Billed height: 1.83 m (6 ft 0 in)
- Billed weight: 108 kg (238 lb)
- Trained by: NJPW Dojo; Kazuo Yamazaki
- Debut: September 14, 1992

Yuji Nagata (永田 裕志, Nagata Yūji; born April 24, 1968) is a Japanese professional wrestler, and former mixed martial artist and amateur wrestler signed to New Japan Pro-Wrestling (NJPW). He is the fifth longest-reigning IWGP Heavyweight Champion with a reign of 392 days, and formerly held the record for most successful title defenses with 10, until Hiroshi Tanahashi broke the record at Wrestle Kingdom VI. He is the only wrestler to have won Japanese professional wrestling's three biggest singles tournaments; New Japan Pro-Wrestling's G1 Climax (in 2001), All Japan Pro Wrestling's Champion Carnival (in 2011) and Pro Wrestling Noah's Global League (in 2013).

Nagata debuted and has worked for NJPW since 1992, where he was recognised as company ace in the early 2000s and is a two-time IWGP Heavyweight Champion, a two-time IWGP Tag Team Champion and a one-time NEVER Openweight Champion in addition to having won the New Japan Cup in 2007 and 2011, the G1 Tag League in 2000 and 2010, and the G1 Climax in 2001. Outside of New Japan Pro-Wrestling, he has held the Triple Crown Heavyweight Championship in All Japan Pro Wrestling and the GHC Heavyweight Championship in Pro Wrestling Noah, making him a four-time world champion in major professional wrestling promotions and one of five men to have held all three major heavyweight championships in Japanese professional wrestling. He was inducted into the Wrestling Observer Newsletter Hall of Fame in 2018.

== Amateur wrestling career ==
Before turning professional, Nagata was a successful amateur wrestler. Nagata met future professional wrestling rival Minoru Suzuki in the amateur wrestling circles. In 1986, when they both were seniors, Suzuki beat Nagata first in a Tokyo high school tournament and again at the Japanese sectionals. Competing in the Greco-Roman style, Nagata represented Japan in the Asian Championships twice, placing fifth in 1993 and placing fourth in 1994, in one World Cup at the Espoir level in 1988, and in the 1991 World Championships, placing twenty-first.

== Professional wrestling career ==
=== New Japan Pro Wrestling (1992–1997) ===
Nagata joined New Japan Pro-Wrestling in April 1992 and trained in the NJPW Dojo. He debuted on September 14 of that year, facing Hiroyoshi Yamamoto. Nagata increased in stature during the 1995 inter-promotional angle pitting NJPW loyalists against UWF International wrestlers. Taught the shoot-style by Kazuo Yamazaki, who had returned to NJPW after leaving UWFI, Nagata learned the style that has been his trademark ever since.

=== World Championship Wrestling excursion (1997–1998) ===
Nagata joined the American World Championship Wrestling promotion in March 1997 as an arrogant villain. He was managed by Sonny Onoo, who also acted as his translator. On March 3, he lost to Ernest Miller in a dark match. His TV debut match was a lost to Dean Malenko on April 21. He began feuding with Último Dragón, with Nagata repeatedly injuring Dragon's shoulder. The two rivals faced one another at Halloween Havoc on October 26, with Nagata forcing his smaller opponent to submit with an arm submission hold. They faced one another in a rematch at World War 3 on November 23, with the added stipulation that, should Dragon win, he would receive five minutes alone in the ring with the interfering Onoo. Nagata was able to pin Dragon following a distraction by Onoo, thus ending their feud.

In 1998, Nagata teamed with Kensuke Sasaki and entered a tournament for the number one contendership for the WCW World Tag Team Championship. Nagata and Sasaki won the tournament, but the title match never took place. Nagata left WCW in August 1998 and returned to New Japan.

=== Return to NJPW (1998–present) ===
==== Main event run (1998–2010) ====
Upon his return, Nagata began challenging for the IWGP Heavyweight Championship. On September 23, 1998, Nagata fought Scott Norton for the vacant title (the previous champion, Masahiro Chono, had suffered a neck injury) in Yokohama, but was defeated.

On August 28, 1999, in Tokyo, Nagata and Manabu Nakanishi defeated Tatsutoshi Goto and Michiyoshi Ohara for the IWGP Tag Team Championship. They held the title until July 20, 2000, when they lost to Satoshi Kojima and Hiroyoshi Tenzan in Sapporo, Hokkaido. Nagata and Nakanishi feuded with Kojima and Tenzan for several months, but were unable to regain the title. On January 4, 2000, his mentor Kazuo Yamazaki retired and Nagata served as his final opponent, winning the match.

In March 2000, Nagata formed an ill-fated stable known as Fighting Club G-EGGS, with all the stable member having legitimate sporting backgrounds. The stable included Manabu Nakanishi, Nagata's tag team partner and co-IWGP Tag Team Champion at the time, Masakazu Fukuda, Yutaka Yoshie and Brian Johnston. Fukuda died in April 2000 from a brain hemorrhage suffered after he took a taking a flying elbow drop during a match against rookie Katsuyori Shibata, and was honored with a ten-bell salute and a tribute show in September of that year. Johnston's participation in the group was largely limited after he suffered a stroke, and Nagata eventually disbanded G-EGGS on June 16, 2001.

In August 2001, Nagata won the eleventh annual G1 Climax tournament, defeating Keiji Mutoh in the finals by submission. Nagata had entered the tournament twice before, but was eliminated in semi-final matches on both instances. Nagata challenged for the IWGP Heavyweight Championship once again after it was vacated by the injured Kazuyuki Fujita on January 4, 2002, but lost to Tadao Yasuda on February 16, 2002, in a tournament final. Nagata defeated Yasuda for the IWGP Heavyweight Championship on April 5, 2002, in the Nippon Budokan. Immediately following his victory, Nagata was attacked by Pro Wrestling Noah mainstay Yoshihiro Takayama. He held the title for thirteen months (setting a record for most successful title defenses in the process) before losing to Takayama on May 2, 2003, in the Tokyo Dome.

On January 4, 2004, he defeated Kensuke Sasaki after 12 minutes of intense action at the Tokyo Dome. In April 2005, Nagata formed "Team JAPAN", a group of former amateur wrestlers with a grudge against the younger generation of wrestlers in NJPW. On December 11, 2005, Nagata challenged Brock Lesnar for his IWGP 3rd Belt Championship but was defeated.

On June 28, 2006, Nagata was announced as a participant in the 2006 G1 Climax, his eighth appearance in the tournament. Nagata challenged for the Triple Crown Heavyweight Championship at the January 4 Dome Show entitled Wrestle Kingdom in Tokyo Dome against the current Triple Crown champion, Minoru Suzuki. Nagata lost after Suzuki applied the Saka-otoshi. He did not submit, but was knocked-out by the hold.

On March 21, 2007, he won the third annual New Japan Cup, becoming the first man to win both the New Japan Cup and the G1 Climax Tournaments. On April 13, 2007, Nagata defeated Hiroshi Tanahashi to win the IWGP Heavyweight Title, marking his second reign, and the first time he has held the belt since April 2002. On October 8, 2007, Hiroshi Tanahashi beat Yuji Nagata at Tokyo Sumo Hall to win the IWGP title. In January 2008 Yuji faced Kurt Angle for the IGF version of the IWGP Heavyweight Championship and lost by submission.

Nagata returned from an undisclosed injury in the summer of 2008 to lead New Japan against Zero1 as New Japan's ace. Yuji feuded particularly with World Heavyweight Champion Masato Tanaka and on October 13, on a New Japan event, Nagata defeated Tanaka to win the World Heavyweight Title following two Backdrop Drivers. He recently defended the belt successfully against Kohei Sato. Nagata made his V2 title defense on December 16 against Tatsuhito Takaiwa.

Following this victory, it was announced Nagata would defend the belt at the January 4 Dome Show entitled Wrestle Kingdom III. At the event, Nagata again overcame Tanaka to make his third defense of the title in 11:41 after a Backdrop Suplex Hold.

On February 15, Nagata defeated Hirooki Goto at New Japan's ISM tour in a match that was supposed to happen at last year's ISM tour show. Nagata lost the World Heavyweight Title on February 27 to Shinjiro Otani after a Dragon Suplex Hold. The following day, Nagata and Hiroshi Tanahashi would defeat Masahiro Chono and Goto. After the match, Nagata announced his participation in the New Japan Cup and intended on winning so he could challenge the winner of the Tanahashi-Angle IWGP Title match. Nagata would make his way to the semifinals of the tournament, before losing to Hirooki Goto. In the fall of 2009 Nagata formed the stable Seigigun ("Blue Justice Army") with Wataru Inoue, Mitsuhide Hirasawa and Super Strong Machine. Yuji had started mentoring both Inoue & Hirasawa, and Strong Machine was entering the role of head trainer at New Japan's dojo.

==== Later years and role as trainer (2010–present) ====
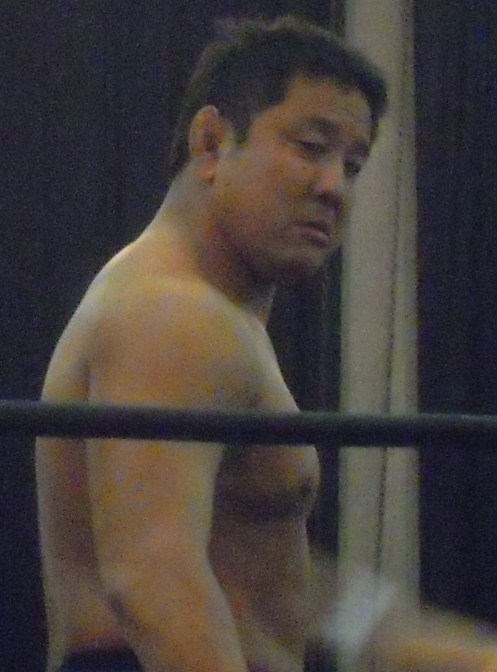
Nagata in November 2011

On May 3, 2010, at Wrestling Dontaku 2010 Nagata and Wataru Inoue defeated No Limit (Tetsuya Naito and Yujiro Takahashi) and Bad Intentions (Giant Bernard and Karl Anderson) in a three-way match to win the IWGP Tag Team Championship. On June 19 at Dominion 6.19, Nagata and Inoue lost the Tag Team Championship to Bernard and Anderson in a three-way elimination match, which also included No Limit. In September Mitsushide Hirasawa left for a learning excursion to Puerto Rico and his spot in Seigigun was given to newcomer King Fale, who was also trained by Nagata & Strong Machine. On October 22, 2010, Nagata and Inoue entered the 2010 G1 Tag League. After four wins and a loss, Nagata and Inoue won their block and advanced to the semifinals of the tournament, where, on November 7, they defeated the IWGP Tag Team Champions, Giant Bernard and Karl Anderson. In the finals of the tournament Nagata and Inoue defeated Tetsuya Naito and Yujiro Takahashi to win the 2010 G1 Tag League, ten years after the first time Nagata had won the tournament. As a result of their victory, Nagata and Inoue received a shot at the IWGP Tag Team Championship on December 11, 2010, but were defeated by the defending champions, Bad Intentions. The following day Minoru Suzuki returned to New Japan and re–ignited his old feud with Nagata by attacking him after a match. On January 4, 2011, at Wrestle Kingdom V in Tokyo Dome, Nagata defeated Suzuki in a grudge match. On March 13, Nagata entered the 2011 New Japan Cup, defeating Giant Bernard in his first round match. On March 19 Nagata defeated Masato Tanaka in the semifinals of the tournament and finally, on March 20, Shinsuke Nakamura in the finals to win the 2011 New Japan Cup and become the number one contender to the IWGP Heavyweight Championship. Nagata received his shot at the IWGP Heavyweight Championship on April 3, but was defeated by the defending champion, Hiroshi Tanahashi. The following week Nagata entered All Japan Pro Wrestling's 2011 Champion Carnival and on April 13, defeated Seiya Sanada in the finals to win the tournament, becoming only the fourth man to have won both the Champion Carnival and G1 Climax tournaments. On June 18, Seigigun member Mitsuhide Hirasawa, now working under the ring name Hideo Saito, returned from his Puerto Rican excursion, turning on Nagata and joining Chaos. The following day Nagata received the shot at Triple Crown Heavyweight Championship he had earned by winning the Champion Carnival, but was defeated by the defending champion, Suwama. In August, Nagata took part in the 2011 G1 Climax and after picking up five victories, he went to the final day of the tournament with a chance of reaching the finals. However, a loss to former protégé, Hideo Saito, who had lost all eight of his previous matches in the G1 Climax, eliminated him from the running for a spot in the finals. On September 19, Nagata seemingly wrapped up his rivalry with Saito by defeating him in a singles match, but was then attacked by his CHAOS stablemate, Toru Yano. On October 10 at Destruction '11, Nagata defeated Yano by rolling him up for the three count. Following the main event, Nagata came out to challenge Hiroshi Tanahashi for the IWGP Heavyweight Championship. However, after Tanahashi had accepted the challenge, he was attacked by Yano, who proceeded to steal the championship belt. After Tanahashi had defeated Yano for the title, he successfully defended it against Nagata on December 4, tying his record of ten successful defenses in the process.

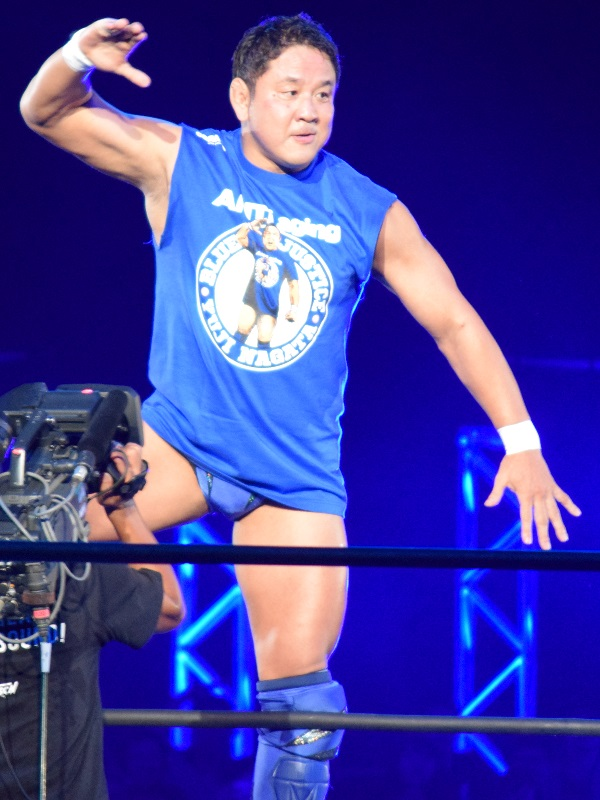
Nagata in August 2015

On January 4, 2012, at Wrestle Kingdom VI in Tokyo Dome, Nagata teamed with Wataru Inoue in a tag team match, where they were defeated by the All Japan Pro Wrestling team of Masakatsu Funaki and Masayuki Kono. During the match, Nagata broke Funaki's orbital bone, sidelining him from in-ring action for an estimated six months. Afterwards, Nagata began making more regular appearances for All Japan, feuding with Funaki's protégé, Kono, in anticipation of Funaki's return in the summer. In April and May, Nagata took part in All Japan's 2012 Champion Carnival, suffering his only round-robin loss against Kono. On May 7, Nagata was defeated in the semifinals of the tournament by Taiyō Kea, who went on to win the entire tournament. On July 29, Nagata was defeated by Masakatsu Funaki in a grudge match. On September 9, Nagata celebrated his 20th anniversary in professional wrestling with an event, which saw him, Jun Akiyama and Masaaki Mochizuki defeat Kazuchika Okada, Shinsuke Nakamura and Yujiro Takahashi in the main event, with Nagata pinning Takahashi for the win. From November 20 to December 1, Nagata and Mochizuki took part in the round-robin portion of the 2012 World Tag League, finishing with a record of four wins and two losses, narrowly missing advancing to the semifinals of the tournament.

On January 4, 2013, at Wrestle Kingdom 7 in Tokyo Dome, Nagata defeated Minoru Suzuki in another chapter of their long rivalry. Afterwards, Nagata started a new rivalry with Kazushi Sakuraba, which led to them forming a brief tag team together in October to feud with Chaos. Nagata defeated Chaos' Takashi Iizuka (Nagata's former tag partner) via disqualification when Toru Yano interfered on November 6, 3 days before Nagata & Sakuraba would take on Iizuka & Yano. At Power Struggle, they defeated Iizuka & Yano when Sakuraba submitted Iizuka. After winning Noah's Global League, Nagata worked most dates on NJPW's World Tag League tour, although due to Noah commitments, he took a break from the tournament itself. On the first day of the tour, he again faced Iizuka one on one, and again won via disqualification, this time after Iizuka used a microphone cord to choke Nagata. Nagata & Sakuraba would team up once again on the final day of the tour to take on Iizuka & his Chaos stablemate, Yoshi-Hashi. Sakuraba submitted Yoshi-Hashi in just under 9 minutes to get him and Nagata the win.

On January 4, 2014, at Wrestle Kingdom 8 in Tokyo Dome, Nagata and Sakuraba teamed up to take on Daniel Gracie & Rolles Gracie, with Nagata getting the win after Daniel illegally used his sleeve to choke Nagata. At The New Beginning in Hiroshima, Nagata and Sakuraba once again took on Chaos' Toru Yano & Takashi Iizuka, this time with Chaos getting the win after Sakuraba used Iizuka's iron glove on him. At The New Beginning in Osaka, they took on the Gracies again, this time under Brazilian jiu-jitsu exhibition rules. Rolles defeated Sakuraba to get the Gracies the win. Nagata took part in the 2014 G1 Climax, where he scored four wins and six losses in what is the largest field in the history of the G1 with 22 participants. Nagata's wins came over Tomoaki Honma, Davey Boy Smith Jr., Katsuyori Shibata & Shelton 'X' Benjamin. Kazushi Sakuraba had joined Chaos at point, so at Destruction in Okayama in September, Nagata & Manabu Nakanishi reformed their tag team to challenge Tencozy for the NWA World Tag Team Championship. Tencozy retained when Kojima pinned Nagata after a Lariat. After again competing in Noah's Global League, Nagata returned to New Japan for the World Tag League 2014 tour, this time participating. Nagata teamed with Nakanishi in the league for the first time since 2007, and the duo scored three wins and four losses, with their biggest win being over tournament winners 'Meiyu Tag' (Hirooki Goto & Katsuyori Shibata), when Nagata performed a 'Backdrop Hold' (Bridging High Angle Belly-to-Back Suplex) on Shibata.

Nagata started his 2015 without a match on the January 4 Tokyo Dome show, but he won the pre-show's New Japan Rumble, pinning Yoshi-Hashi with a Backdrop Driver to win. The next night, Nagata again pinned Yoshi-Hashi in a six-man tag team match featuring IWGP Intercontinental Champion, Shinsuke Nakamura. Nagata challenged Nakamura after the match. On February 14, 2015, Nagata returned to the singles title picture in his home promotion, when he unsuccessfully challenged Nakamura for the IWGP Intercontinental Championship at The New Beginning in Sendai. Nagata took part in the 2014 New Japan Cup, losing in the first round to Hirooki Goto after a 'Shouten-Kai' (Vertical Suplex Side Slam). From July 23 to August 15, Nagata took part in the 2015 G1 Climax. Though finishing with a record of only three wins and six losses, Nagata closed his tournament with a big win over now-reigning IWGP Intercontinental Champion, Hirooki Goto. Nagata would again team with Nakanishi in the World Tag League. In the 2015 tournament, the duo scored two wins and four losses, failing to advance to the finals, but Nagata scored a win over former tag team partner Kazushi Sakuraba with the Backdrop Driver.

Nagata was again in the New Japan Rumble on Wrestle Kingdom 10 in Tokyo Dome's pre-show, but he was unsuccessful this time, being eliminated by King Haku. Nagata participated in the 2016 New Japan Cup, once again being eliminated in the first round by Hirooki Goto, this time with the 'Goto Shiki' pin. After the tour, Nagata started feuding with former tag partner Sakuraba. The feud culminated at Invasion Attack 2016 when Nagata, Kojima & Jyushin Thunder Liger defeated Sakuraba, Yano & Yoshi-Hashi when Nagata pinned Yoshi-Hashi with the Backdrop Hold. Later that show, Nagata, Kojima & Nakanishi cornered Tenzan for his NEVER Openweight Championship challenge against Shibata. After Tenzan's loss, Nagata challenged Shibata for the belt. On May 3, 2016, at Wrestling Dontaku 2016, Nagata won his first NJPW singles title in nine years, when he defeated Katsuyori Shibata for the NEVER Openweight Championship. He lost the title back to Shibata on June 19 at Dominion 6.19 in Osaka-jo Hall. From July 22 to August 13, Nagata took part in the 2016 G1 Climax, where he finished with a record of three wins and six losses. He won his first three matches, the most notable, his first one against recent IWGP Heavyweight Champion Tetsuya Naito. At Destruction in Tokyo in September, Nagata & Nakanishi teamed up to defeat Hunter Club (Yoshitatsu & Captain New Japan) when Nagata pinned Captain after an 'Exploder of Justice' (Exploder Suplex). The duo would come up short when taking on reDRagon (Kyle O'Reilly & Bobby Fish) at Destruction in Kobe as O'Reilly would submit Nakanishi with an armbar. Also at this show, Captain New Japan would betray Yoshitatsu for Bullet Club. For the 2016 World Tag League, Nagata teamed with Shibata. This pairing would prove more successful for Nagata as the duo scored four wins and three losses, including a win over tournament winners G・B・H (Togi Makabe & Tomoaki Honma).

In 2017, Nagata again wrestled on the Wrestle Kingdom pre-show. He was again unsuccessful in the New Japan Rumble as he was eliminated by NJPW legend Hiro Saito. Nagata participated in the 2017 New Japan Cup replacing a severely injured Tomoaki Honma. He defeated Tanga Loa with a Backdrop Driver in the first round before losing to Evil. Around this time, Nagata transitioned into a much smaller role, focusing on his mentoring and training of New Japan's young prospects. He took part in his final G1 Climax, where he finished with a record of one win and eight losses. Dave Meltzer of the Wrestling Observer Newsletter wrote that Nagata had "probably his best in-ring tournament even though he was booked to lose eight of his nine matches", adding that many had him as the tournament MVP. After losing his final G1 match to Bad Luck Fale, Fale showed him respect by bowing down to him and leaving the ring immediately after. Nagata reformed his team with Nakanishi to participate in the 2017 World Tag League, scoring two wins and five losses. Nagata scored a win over former tag team partner Takashi Iizuka with a Backdrop Driver, while Nakanishi scored a submission victory over Nagata's trainee Fale's team when he submitted Chase Owens with an Argentine Backbreaker.

Nagata would spend 2018 working mostly with Young Lions. He again competed in the New Japan Rumble at Wrestle Kingdom 12, this time eliminated by Nakanishi, Chase Owens & Katsuya Kitamura all at once. The following night, at New Year Dash!!, he teamed up with fellow 'third generation' wrestlers Tenzan, Kojima & Nakanishi to defeat the 4 Young lions in training at the time, Tomoyuki Oka, Shota Umino, Tetsuhiro Yagi & Ren Narita, all of whom Nagata had a hand in training. On February 3, Nagata and Jun Akiyama defeated Naoya Nomura & Ryoji Sai to win the All Asia Tag Team Championship at All Japan Pro-Wrestling's Yokohama Twilight Blues Special. The duo first defended against a reunited 'Wild Child' (Nakanishi & Takao Omori) on March 25, and then against 'Nextream' (Naoya Nomura & Yuma Aoyagi) on June 12. Nagata took part in Super Strong Machine's Retirement Event, performing as 'Strong Machine Justice' alongside Hiroshi Tanahashi (Strong Machine Ace), Strong Machine Buffalo (Hiroyoshi Tenzan), Strong Machine Don (Manabu Nakanishi) & Strong Machine 69 (Ryusuke Taguchi) to defeat Los Ingobernables de Japón (Tetsuya Naito, Eviil, Sanada, Hiromu Takahashi & Bushi). Nagata & Akiyama would lose their tag belts a month later to Nextream at AJPW's 'Summer Action Series' on July 29. Nagata & Nakanishi once again teamed for the World Tag League, scoring three wins and ten losses in the 2018 tournament.

At Wrestle Kingdom 13's pre-show, Nagata replaced Michael Elgin in a gauntlet match to determine number one contenders to the NEVER Openweight 6-Man Tag Team Championships teaming with Jeff Cobb and David Finlay, but were unsuccessful. The next day at New Years Dash!!!, Nagata began a feud with Tomohiro Ishii. The feud would end in the first round of the New Japan Cup, with Ishii defeating Nagata after a Vertical Drop Brainbuster. Nagata & Nakanishi, in the 2019 World Tag League, teamed up in what would be Nakanishi's last Tag League. The duo finished their final tournament together with two wins and thirteen losses, coming last. In December 2019, Nagata announced his contract renewal with NJPW to confirm he would continue wrestling in 2020.

At Wrestle Kingdom 14 in Tokyo Dome, Nagata was again on the pre-show, this time in a tag team match alongside Nakanishi to take on Tencozy, which they lost. This would be Nakanishi's final match in the Dome. On February 22, Nagata teamed up with Nakanishi & Tencozy in Nakanishi's retirement match. They faced Chaos' Kazuchika Okada & Hirooki Goto, and NJPW's Hiroshi Tanahashi & Kota Ibushi in a losing effort when Nakanishi was pinned by Tanahashi following a 'High Fly Flow' (Frog splash). In June 2020, Nagata entered the 2020 New Japan Cup, which was delayed due to the COVID-19 pandemic, defeating long time rival Minoru Suzuki in round one, before losing to Kazuchika Okada in the second round. Suzuki angered by the loss, declared war on Nagata, with Suzuki eventually beating him in a singles match on Day 4 of New Japan’s Summer Struggle series, ending their feud. With Nakanishi retired and a smaller field in the 2020 World Tag League, Nagata didn't make it into the tournament.

At Wrestle Kingdom 15 in Tokyo Dome in January 2021, Nagata wrestled on the pre-show. He entered the New Japan Rambo, where he and Suzuki, who were brawling, were eliminated over the top rope simultaneously by Toa Henare. 2 nights later, at New Year Dash!!, Nagata defeated Young Lion, Gabriel Kidd via submission in 7 minutes and 59 seconds with the 'Nagata Lock II' (Arm-Trap Crossface).

On April 5, Jon Moxley–who wrestles for both NJPW and American promotion All Elite Wrestling (AEW), a company which NJPW shares a partnership with–challenged Nagata to a match for the IWGP United States Heavyweight Championship. On April 29, the match was set between the two for the May 12 episode of AEW's television show Dynamite. Moxley won the match and they bowed to each other in respect afterwards.

In the leadup to Resurgence, Jon Moxley teased that he would be joined by a mystery tag team partner in his match against The Good Brothers. On August 14, at the event, Nagata was revealed to be the mystery partner. The Good Brothers defeated Moxley and Nagata in 10 minutes and 33 seconds.

On September 21, Tetsuya Naito was forced to withdraw from the G1 Climax 31 due to a knee injury suffered during his match with Zack Sabre Jr. As a result, the remainder of Naito's matches were forfeited and replaced with Special Singles Matches. Nagata will be wrestling two of these, taking on Tanga Loa on September 23 and Shingo Takagi on September 26.

=== Pro Wrestling Noah (2012–2015) ===
In November 2012, Nagata took part in Pro Wrestling Noah's 2012 Global League, where he won four out of his six matches, with a loss to GHC Heavyweight Champion Takeshi Morishima on the final day, costing him a spot in the finals. From late October 2013 to early November, Nagata took part in Pro Wrestling Noah's 2013 Global League, defeating Takeshi Morishima in the finals on November 10 to win the tournament and become the first wrestler to have won the G1 Climax, the Champion Carnival and the Global League. As a result of his Global League win, Nagata received a shot at the GHC Heavyweight Championship, but was defeated by the defending champion, Kenta, on December 7. Nagata received another shot at the title on February 8, 2014, and defeated Takeshi Morishima to become the new champion. He lost the title to Naomichi Marufuji in his fifth defense on July 5.

In August 2015, Nagata, performing as 'Maybach Blue Justice', teamed with Maybach Taniguchi and Manabu Nakanishi (performing as 'Maybach Don') in the Arukas Cup Six-Man Tag Team Tournament. They won the tournament, defeating Suzuki-gun's Minoru Suzuki, Takashi Iizuka & El Desperado in the final.

== As a trainer ==
=== Wrestlers trained ===
- Yuya Uemura
- Yuma Anzai
- Ryuki Honda
- Momo Kohgo
- Shota Umino
- Great-O-Khan
- Master Wato
- Jay White
- Yoh
- Sho
- Bad Luck Fale
- Kazuchika Okada
- Yoshi Tatsu
- Oleg Boltin
- Aaron Wolf

== Mixed martial arts record ==
Nagata has also participated in two mixed martial arts bouts, losing in 21 seconds to Mirko Cro Cop at Inoki Bom-Ba-Ye 2001 (which was Cro Cop's third mixed martial arts fight), and in 1 minute, 2 seconds to Fedor Emelianenko at Inoki Bom-Ba-Ye 2003.

Professional record breakdown
2 matches	0 wins	2 losses
By knockout	0	2

Res.	Record	Opponent	Method	Event	Date	Round	Time	Location	Notes
Loss	0–2	Fedor Emelianenko	TKO (punches)	Inoki Bom-Ba-Ye 2003	December 31, 2003	1	1:02	Kobe, Japan	
Loss	0–1	Mirko Cro Cop	TKO (punches)	Inoki Bom-Ba-Ye 2001	December 31, 2001	1	0:21	Saitama, Japan	

== Personal life ==
Nagata is married to a woman named Chieko, with whom he has a son named Yusei, who trains in amateur wrestling.

His brother, Katsuhiko, is a former Olympic wrestler, who won silver in the 69kg Greco-Roman event at the 2000 Summer Olympics. Katsuhiko has also appeared in New Japan Pro Wrestling (NJPW), where he was defeated by his brother in an amateur wrestling exhibition at Toukon Festival: Wrestling World 2005.

== Championships and accomplishments ==
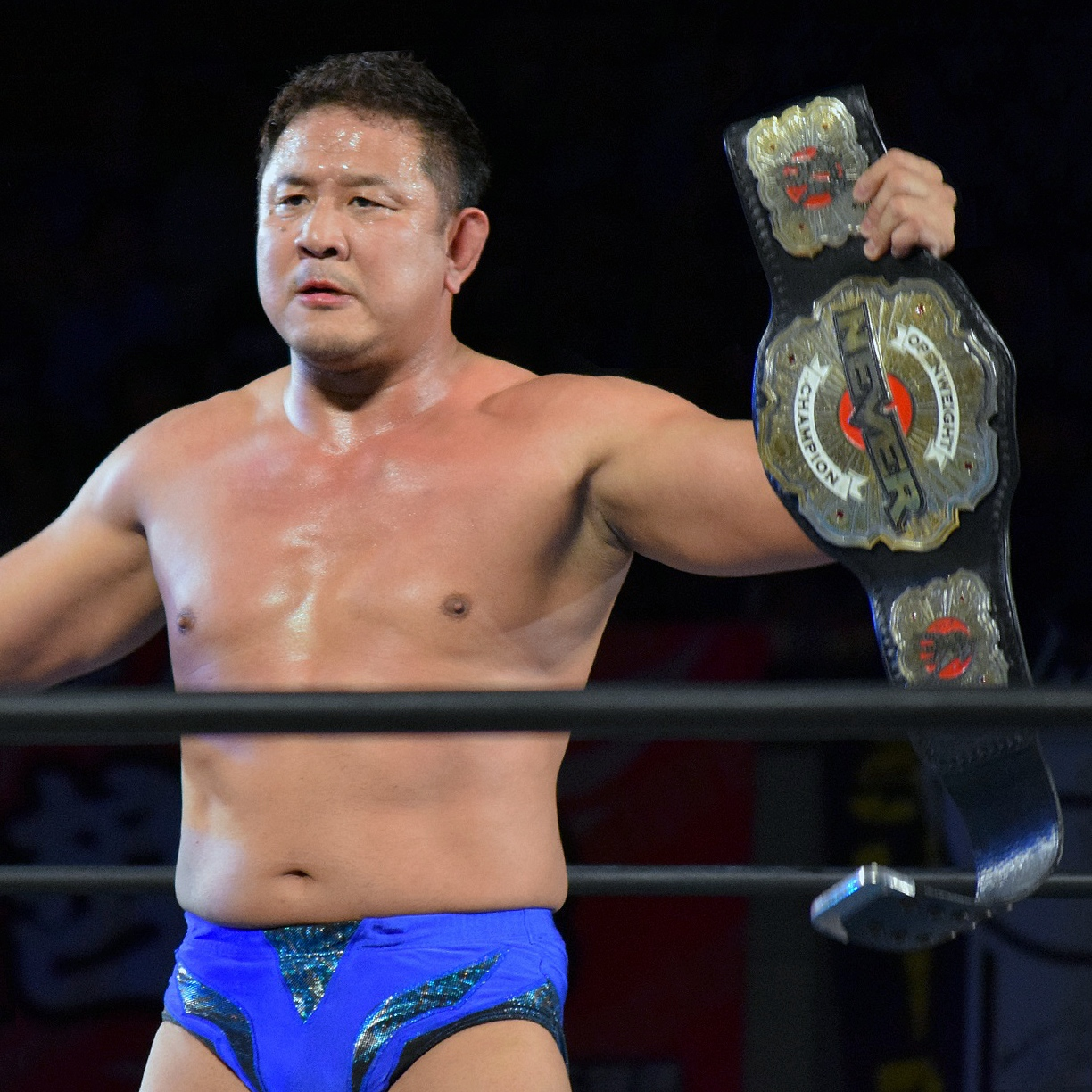
Nagata as the NEVER Openweight Champion

- All Japan Pro Wrestling
  - Triple Crown Heavyweight Championship (1 time)
  - All Asia Tag Team Championship (1 time) – with Jun Akiyama
  - World Tag Team Championship (1 time) – with Kendo Kashin
  - Champion Carnival (2011)
- DDT Pro-Wrestling
  - Ironman Heavymetalweight Championship (2 times, current)
- Kyushu Pro-Wrestling
  - Kyushu Pro-Wrestling Tag Team Championship (1 time, current) – with Tajiri
- New Japan Pro-Wrestling
  - IWGP Heavyweight Championship (2 times)
  - IWGP Tag Team Championship (2 times) – with Manabu Nakanishi (1) and Wataru Inoue (1)
  - NEVER Openweight Championship (1 time)
  - G1 Climax (2001)
  - G1 Tag League (2000) – with Takashi Iizuka
  - G1 Tag League (2010) – Wataru Inoue
  - New Japan Cup (2007, 2011)
  - New Japan Rumble (2015)
  - WCW World Tag Team Title Contenders League (1998) – with Kensuke Sasaki
  - Naeba Prince Hotel Cup Tag Tournament (2001) – with Jushin Thunder Liger
  - Samurai! TV Openweight Tag Team Tournament (2005) – with Hirooki Goto
  - MVP Award (2002)
  - Outstanding Performance Award (2001)
  - Singles Best Bout (2001) – vs. Keiji Mutoh on August 12
  - Singles Best Bout (2002) – vs. Masahiro Chono on October 26
  - Tag Team Best Bout (2000) – with Manabu Nakanishi vs. Hiroyoshi Tenzan and Satoshi Kojima on October 9
  - Tag Team Best Bout (2001) – with Jun Akiyama vs. Hiroshi Hase and Keiji Mutoh on October 8
- Nikkan Sports
  - Match of the Year (2001) – with Jun Akiyama vs. Hiroshi Hase and Keiji Mutoh on October 8
  - Fighting Spirit Award (2012)
- Pro Wrestling Illustrated
  - Ranked No. 8 of the top 500 singles wrestlers in the "PWI 500" in 2002
  - Ranked No. 218 of the top 500 singles wrestlers of the "PWI Years" in 2003
- Pro Wrestling Noah
  - GHC Heavyweight Championship (1 time)
  - GHC Tag Team Championship (1 time) – with Hiroshi Tanahashi
  - Arukas Cup 6-Man Tag Tournament (2015) – with Maybach Don and Maybach Taniguchi
  - Global League (2013)
  - Global League Fighting Spirit Award (2014)
- Pro Wrestling Zero1-Max
  - World Heavyweight Championship (1 time)
- Tokyo Sports
  - Fighting Spirit Award (2001, 2011)
  - Match of the Year Award (2001) vs. Kazuyuki Fujita on June 6
  - Match of the Year Award (2002) vs. Yoshihiro Takayama on May 2
  - Technique Award (1998, 1999)
- Wrestling Observer Newsletter
  - Wrestling Observer Newsletter Hall of Fame (Class of 2018)
