= Wrestle Kingdom 14 =

2020 New Japan Pro-Wrestling event

- Promotional poster featuring Jushin Thunder Liger
- Promotion: New Japan Pro-Wrestling
- Date: January 4–5, 2020
- City: Tokyo, Japan
- Venue: Tokyo Dome
- Attendance: Night 1: 40,008; Night 2: 30,063; Combined: 70,071
- Tagline(s): Liger the Final; Pinnacle of Strength, Birthplace of Legend

Event chronology
← Previous; NJPW Showdown; Road to Tokyo Dome	Next → New Year Dash!!

Wrestle Kingdom chronology
← Previous; 13	Next → 15

Wrestle Kingdom 14 in Tokyo Dome was a two-night professional wrestling pay-per-view (PPV) event produced by New Japan Pro-Wrestling (NJPW). The event took place on January 4 and 5, 2020, at the Tokyo Dome, in Tokyo, Japan. It was the 29th January 4 Tokyo Dome Show and the 14th promoted under the Wrestle Kingdom name; it was also the first time the event was held over two days.

The main event of night one saw Kazuchika Okada defeat Kota Ibushi to retain the IWGP Heavyweight Championship. In other prominent matches during night one, Tetsuya Naito defeated Jay White to win the IWGP Intercontinental Championship, the returning Hiromu Takahashi defeated Will Ospreay to capture the IWGP Junior Heavyweight Championship, Jon Moxley defeated Lance Archer in a Texas Death match to regain the IWGP United States Heavyweight Championship and FinJuice (Juice Robinson and David Finlay) defeated the Guerrillas of Destiny (Tama Tonga and Tanga Loa) to win the IWGP Tag Team Championship.

In night two's main event, Naito defeated Okada in a Double Gold Dash match; which was promoted as a Double Gold Dash, for both the IWGP Heavyweight and the IWGP Intercontinental championships. In other notable matches, Chris Jericho defeated Hiroshi Tanahashi, Jay White defeated Kota Ibushi, Hirooki Goto won the NEVER Openweight Championship from Kenta, Jon Moxley successfully defended the IWGP United States Heavyweight Championship against Juice Robinson, Zack Sabre Jr. retained the British Heavyweight Championship against Sanada and Roppongi 3K (Sho and Yoh) defeated Bullet Club (Taiji Ishimori and El Phantasmo) to win the IWGP Junior Heavyweight Tag Team Championship. The event also saw the retirement match of wrestling legend Jushin Thunder Liger.

== Production ==
=== Background ===
The January 4 Tokyo Dome Show is NJPW's biggest annual event and has been called "the largest professional wrestling show in the world outside of the United States" and the "Japanese equivalent to the Super Bowl". The show has been promoted under the Wrestle Kingdom name since 2007.

Wrestle Kingdom 14 was officially announced at Wrestle Kingdom 13 on January 4, 2019. It was the first January 4 Tokyo Dome Show to be held over two days.

On December 24, 2019, NJPW's sister promotion World Wonder Ring Stardom announced that they would have a match on the January 4 event. This marked the first women's match in Wrestle Kingdom history.

=== Storylines ===
Wrestle Kingdom 14 featured professional wrestling matches that will involve different wrestlers from pre-existing scripted feuds and storylines. Wrestlers portrayed villains, heroes, or less distinguishable characters in the scripted events that built tension and culminated in a wrestling match or series of matches.

On March 7, 2019, it was announced that Wrestle Kingdom 14 would feature the retirement match of NJPW's junior heavyweight legend Jushin Thunder Liger, who wrestled in the opening televised match at the first January 4 Tokyo Dome Show in 1992.

On August 12, 2019, Kota Ibushi won the G1 Climax 29 by defeating Jay White in the tournament final, entitling him to a match for the IWGP Heavyweight Championship at Wrestle Kingdom. On night eighteen of the G1 Climax, White defeated Tetsuya Naito to advanced to the final. On September 22 at Destruction in Kobe, White defeated Naito to win the IWGP Intercontinental Championship. During the year; Ibushi, Naito and White all stated their intentions to become double champion at Wrestle Kingdom. On November 3 at Power Struggle, after White's Intercontinental Championship match; Okada, Ibushi, White and Naito came to the ring where Okada suggested to have a fan vote to check if the NJPW fans wanted to see a double title match for both the IWGP Heavyweight and IWGP Intercontinental championships as the main event of night two at Wrestle Kingdom. NJPW held a public poll the next day, where the fans voted in favor for a double title match. On November 5, an IWGP Intercontinental Championship match between White and Naito for night 1 and the double title match for night 2 was scheduled. With the losers of the IWGP Heavyweight Championship and IWGP Intercontinental Championship matches on night 1, facing off in a match on the night 2.

On July 7, 2018, Hiromu Takahashi suffered a neck injury during his title defense for the IWGP Junior Heavyweight Championship against Dragon Lee at the G1 Special in San Francisco. On August 20, NJPW stripped Takahashi of the title as he would not be able to defend the title and would have been out of action for 9–12 months. On June 5, 2019, Will Ospreay won the Best of the Super Juniors by defeating Shingo Takagi in the final, and later captured the IWGP Junior Heavyweight Championship at Dominion 6.9 in Osaka-jo Hall on June 9. At Power Struggle, after Ospreay defended the title against Bushi, Ospreay issued an invitation to anyone in the Junior Heavyweight division to a match at Wrestle Kingdom for the title which was answered by a returning Takahashi. The match was officially scheduled by NJPW on November 5.

At Dominion, Chris Jericho faced Kazuchika Okada for the IWGP Heavyweight Championship, which Jericho lost. After the match, Jericho attacked Okada, which led Hiroshi Tanahashi to come to Okada's aide; when Jericho left the ring he insulted Tanahashi. At Power Struggle, after Tanahashi and Ibushi defeated Chaos' Okada and Yoshi-Hashi in a tag team match, a video of Jericho was played to Tanahashi, where Jericho challenged Tanahashi to a match at Wrestle Kingdom on January 5, which Tanahashi accepted. At the final night World Tag League tournament, another video of Jericho was played to Tanahashi. In a later interview with Tokyo Sports, Tanahashi expressed interest in challenging for Jericho's AEW World Championship if he happened to beat him. On December 28, 2019, via Jericho's Instagram, it was announced that Jericho conferred with All Elite Wrestling (AEW) founder, president, and CEO Tony Khan, and Khan granted a future title shot, should Tanahashi win.

On December 8, 2019, after the final match in the World Tag League tournament fought by Lance Archer and Minoru Suzuki, Jon Moxley appeared, to challenge Archer, demanding a Texas Death match for the IWGP United States Heavyweight Championship. The match rules were later clarified by NJPW: no disqualification rules, and the victory would come only by knockout or submission. The winner of the Texas Death match would then go on to face Juice Robinson for the title on night two.

== Event ==
=== Night 1 ===
Other on-screen personnel
Role:	Name:
English Commentators	Gino Gambino
English Commentators	Kevin Kelly
English Commentators	Chris Charlton
English Commentators	Rocky Romero
Japanese Commentators	Shinpei Nogami
Japanese Commentators	Milano Collection A.T.
Japanese Commentators	Katsuhiko Kanazawa
Japanese Commentators	Kazuyoshi Sakai
Japanese Commentators	Togi Makabe (Guest)
Ring announcers	Hidekazu Tanaka (Jushin Thunder Liger's match)
Ring announcers	Kimihiko Ozaki
Ring announcers	Makoto Abe
Referees	Norio Honaga (Jushin Thunder Liger's match)
Referees	Kenta Sato
Referees	Marty Asami
Referees	Red Shoes Unno
Referees	Tiger Hattori

==== Dark match ====
Prior to the televised portion of the event, World Wonder Ring Stardom wrestlers Mayu Iwatani and Arisa Hoshiki defeated Hana Kimura and Giulia in a Stardom Special tag team match.

==== Pre-show ====
Before the official start of the event, two matches occurred on the pre-show, the first of which pitted Alex Coughlin, Clark Connors, Karl Fredericks, and Toa Henare against Great Bash Heel (Togi Makabe and Tomoaki Honma), Yota Tsuji and Yuya Uemura in an eight-man tag team match. In the end, Henare slammed Tsuji with the "TOA Bottom" to win the match for his team.

In the second and last match on the pre-show, Tencozy (Hiroyoshi Tenzan and Satoshi Kojima) faced Yuji Nagata and Manabu Nakanishi. In the match's climax, Kojima pinned Nakanishi after a lariat.

==== Preliminary matches ====
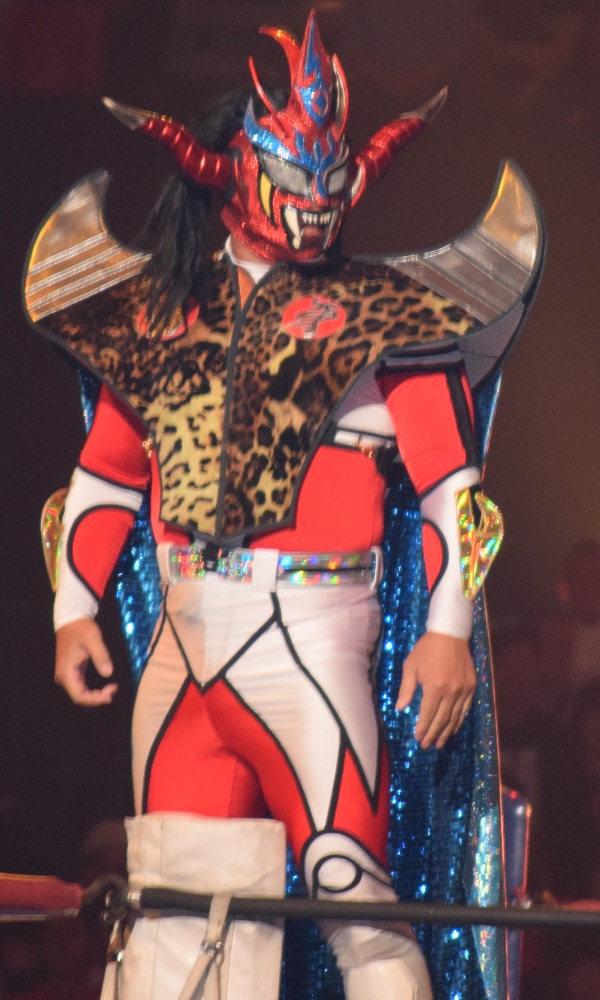
The event saw Jushin Thunder Liger's final match

The actual pay-per-view opened with an eight-man tag team match with Naoki Sano, Shinjiro Otani, Tatsuhito Takaiwa, and Ryusuke Taguchi (accompanied by Kuniaki Kobayashi) facing Jushin Thunder Liger, Tatsumi Fujinami, The Great Sasuke, and Tiger Mask IV (accompanied by El Samurai). Norio Honaga served as the special guest referee. In the end, Taguchi hit Liger with a "Dodon" to win the match.

Next, Suzuki-gun (El Desperado, Minoru Suzuki, Taichi and Zack Sabre Jr.) took on Los Ingobernables de Japón (Sanada, Evil, Shingo Takagi, and Bushi) in another eight-man tag team match. Sabre Jr. forced Bushi to submit to the "Jim Breaks Armbar" to gain the victory for Suzuki-gun.

Afterwards, Chaos (Hirooki Goto, Yoshi-Hashi, Tomohiro Ishii and Toru Yano) faced Bullet Club (Bad Luck Fale, Chase Owens, Kenta and Yujiro Takahashi). In the end, Goto performed the "GTR" on Takahashi to win.

In the following match, the Guerrillas of Destiny (Tama Tonga and Tanga Loa, accompanied by Jado) defended the IWGP Tag Team Championship against FinJuice (David Finlay and Juice Robinson). Despite interference from Jado, Finlay and Robinson managed to recover. Finlay performed an "Acid Drop" on Tonga to win the titles for the first time.

Following this, Lance Archer defended the IWGP United States Championship against Jon Moxley in a Texas Deathmatch. After the use of multiple weapons, including steel chairs, kendo sticks and trash cans, Moxley performed a "Death Rider" from the ring apron through multiple tables, allowing Moxley to win by knockout, capturing the title for the second time in the process.

The next match was for the IWGP Junior Heavyweight Championship, with champion Will Ospreay defending the title against challenger Hiromu Takahashi. In the match's climax, Takahashi performed a "Canadian Destroyer" for a near fall. Takahashi then performed a "Time Bomb" for another near fall. Takahashi then hit a "Time Bomb II", the debut of his new finishing move, on Ospreay for the victory.

Next, Jay White (accompanied by Gedo) defended the IWGP Intercontinental Championship against Tetsuya Naito. In the end, Naito performed a modified "Brainbuster" and a "Destino" for the pinfall victory. With this win, Naito became a record-tying five time IWGP Intercontinental Champion.

==== Main event ====
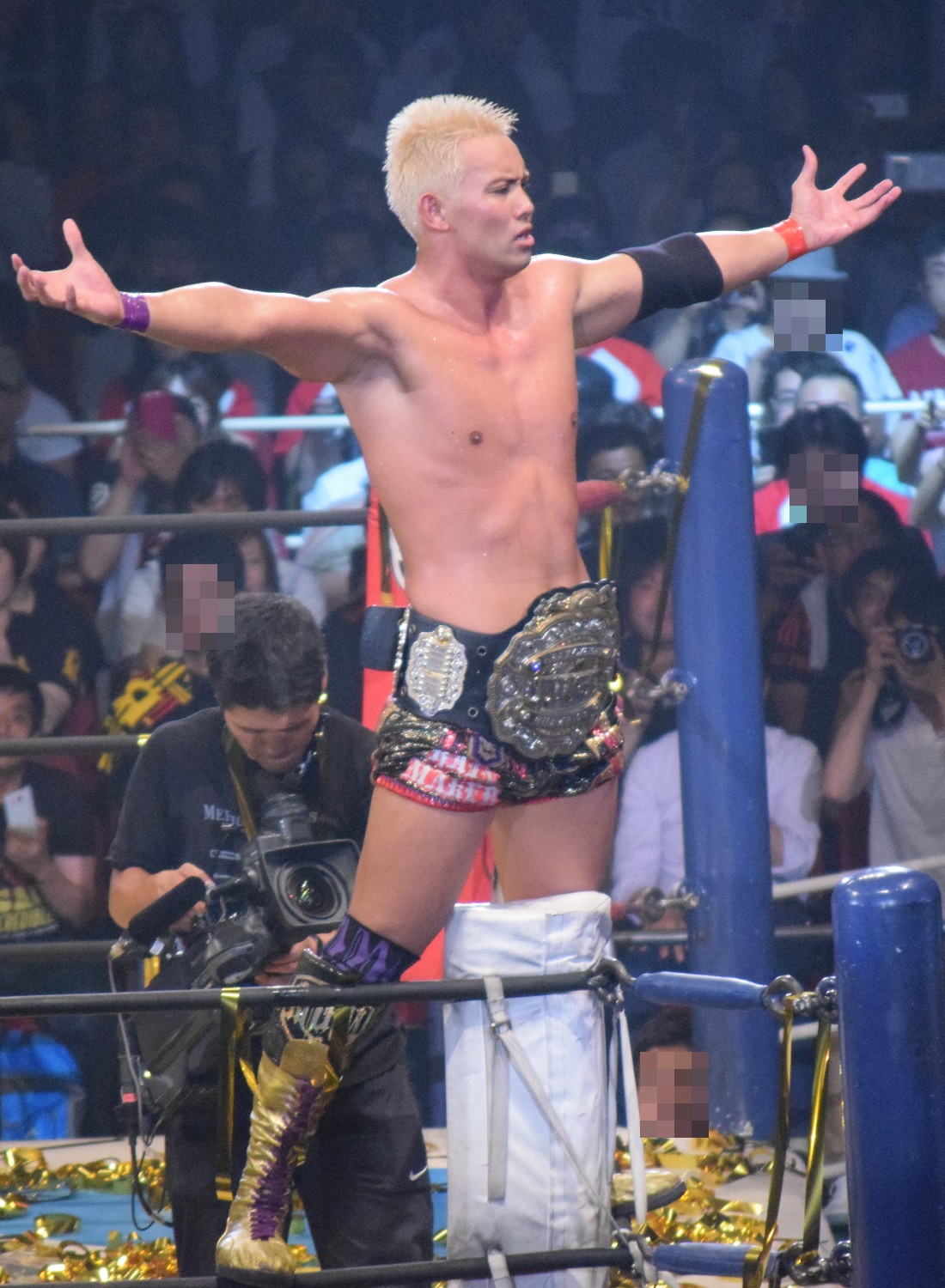
In the main event of night 1, Kazuchika Okada defeated Kota Ibushi to retain the IWGP Heavyweight Championship

The main event saw Kazuchika Okada defend the IWGP Heavyweight Championship against G1 Climax winner Kota Ibushi. In the match's closing moments, Okada avoided a "Phoenix Splash" before hitting Ibushi with a "Rainmaker" for a near-fall. Ibushi came back with a running knee strike to Okada's face, but Okada quickly recovered and performed a sit-out "Tombstone Piledriver" and another "Rainmaker" to win and retain the championship.

=== Night 2 ===
Other on-screen personnel
Role:	Name:
English Commentators	Gino Gambino
English Commentators	Kevin Kelly
English Commentators	Chris Charlton
English Commentators	Rocky Romero
Japanese Commentators	Shinpei Nogami
Japanese Commentators	Milano Collection A.T.
Japanese Commentators	Yasutaro Matsuki
Japanese Commentators	Miki Motoi
Japanese Commentators	Togi Makabe (Guest)
Ring announcers	Kimihiko Ozaki
Ring announcers	Makoto Abe
Referees	Jeremy Marcus (Pre-show)
Referees	Kenta Sato
Referees	Tiger Hattori
Referees	Marty Asami
Referees	Red Shoes Unno

==== Pre-show ====
On the pre-show, The Most Violent Players (Togi Makabe and Toru Yano) and Ryusuke Taguchi defended the NEVER Openweight 6-Man Tag Team Championship against Los Ingobernables de Japón (Evil, Shingo Takagi, and Bushi), Chaos (Tomohiro Ishii, Yoshi-Hashi, and Robbie Eagles), Suzuki-gun (Taichi, El Desperado, and Yoshinobu Kanemaru) and Bullet Club (Bad Luck Fale, Yujiro Takahashi, and Chase Owens) in a five-team gauntlet match. Bullet Club was eliminated when Ishii pinned Owens after slamming him with a "Brainbuster". Suzuki-gun was eliminated when Eagles pinned Kanemaru with a roll-up. Chaos was eliminated after Evil performed the "Darkness Falls" on Ishii. Makabe, Yano and Taguchi were eliminated when Takagi performed "Made in Japan" on Taguchi, therefore winning the match and the titles for Los Ingobernables de Japón.

==== Preliminary matches ====
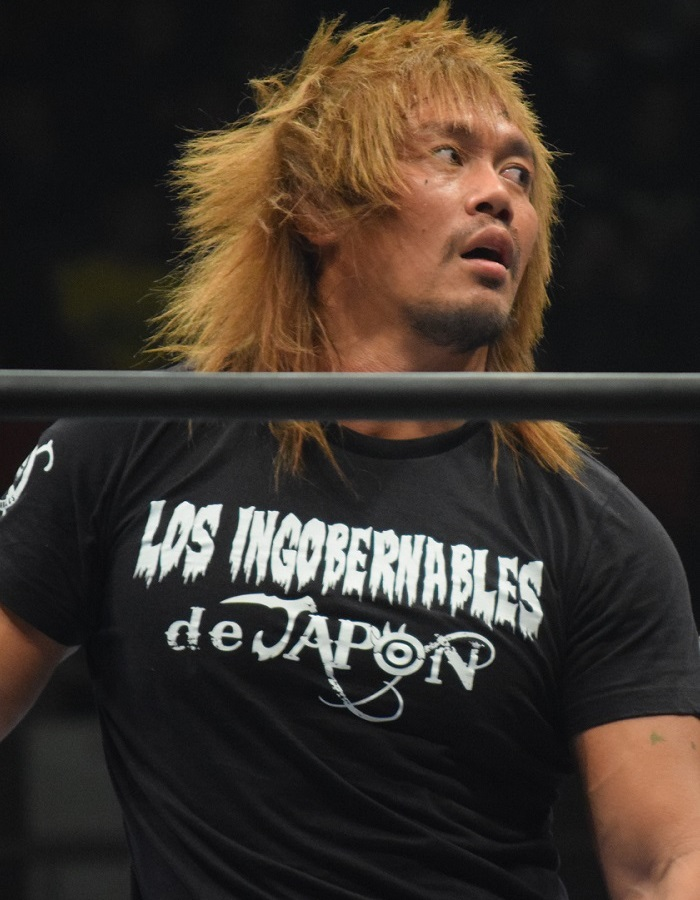
Tetsuya Naito defeated Kazuchika Okada in the main event of night 2, to become the first man to hold the IWGP Heavyweight Championship and the IWGP Intercontinental Championship simultaneously

The show started with Jushin Thunder Liger and Naoki Sano (accompanied by Yoshiaki Fujiwara) taking on Hiromu Takahashi and Ryu Lee. This was Liger's retirement match. The match ended when Takahashi performed the "Time Bomb" on Liger for the victory. After the match, Liger thanked the crowd for their years of support and bowed to them while leaving.

Next, Bullet Club (El Phantasmo and Taiji Ishimori) defended the IWGP Junior Heavyweight Tag Team Championship against Roppongi 3K (Sho and Yoh). Roppongi 3K won when Sho pinned El Phantasmo after a "Strong X", in the process capturing the tag team titles for the fourth time.

Following this, the British Heavyweight Championship was on the line as champion Zack Sabre Jr. defended the championship against Sanada. The match ended when Sabre Jr. countered a "O'Connor Roll" into a European Clutch, scoring the win and retaining the title.

After that match, Jon Moxley defended the IWGP United States Championship against Juice Robinson (accompanied by David Finlay). In the match's climax, Moxley countered a "Pulp Friction facebuster" from Robinson into a "Death Rider DDT", before picking Robinson up again and performing another of the same DDT for the victory. After the match, Moxley was attacked by Minoru Suzuki.

After this, Kenta defended the NEVER Openweight Championship against Hirooki Goto. Goto performed the "GTR" on Kenta for the victory and the championship.

The next match pitted Jay White (accompanied by Gedo) against Kota Ibushi. After heavy interference from Gedo, White eventually performed the "Blade Runner" on Ibushi to win the match via pinfall. Following the match, White and Gedo continued to attack Ibushi before leaving.

In the penultimate match, Chris Jericho took on Hiroshi Tanahashi. If Tanahashi was to defeat Jericho, he would receive a match for Jericho's AEW World Championship at a later date. The match ended when Tanahashi attempted a diving crossbody, but Jericho countered it into a "Codebreaker". Jericho then applied the "Liontamer" and forced Tanahashi to submit to win the match.

==== Main event ====
In the main event, IWGP Heavyweight Champion Kazuchika Okada faced IWGP Intercontinental Champion Tetsuya Naito in a Double Gold Dash match for both of the championships. During the match's climax, Naito countered a "Rainmaker" into a "Destino" for a near-fall. Naito later attempted another "Destino", but Okada prevented it. After finally hitting his old "Stardust Press" finisher, Naito eventually performed another "Destino" for the victory and both championships. After the match, Naito indicated that he wanted another match with Okada as Okada was being helped to the back. Shortly after, Naito was jumped by Kenta. Los Ingobernables de Japón teammate Bushi then arrived and helped Naito walk backstage as the show ended.

== Results ==
Night 1
No.	Results	Stipulations	Times
1^{D}	Stars (Mayu Iwatani and Arisa Hoshiki) defeated Hana Kimura and Giulia (with Jungle Kyona and Konami)	Tag team match This was a Stardom exhibition match.	9:04
2^{P}	Toa Henare, Karl Fredericks, Clark Connors and Alex Coughlin defeated Great Bash Heel (Togi Makabe and Tomoaki Honma), Yota Tsuji and Yuya Uemura	Eight-man tag team match	7:36
3^{P}	Tencozy (Hiroyoshi Tenzan and Satoshi Kojima) defeated Yuji Nagata and Manabu Nakanishi	Tag team match	5:47
4	Naoki Sano, Shinjiro Otani, Tatsuhito Takaiwa and Ryusuke Taguchi (with Kuniaki Kobayashi) defeated Jushin Thunder Liger, Tatsumi Fujinami, The Great Sasuke and Tiger Mask (with El Samurai)	Eight-man tag team match with Norio Honaga as special guest referee	8:52
5	Suzuki-gun (Zack Sabre Jr., Minoru Suzuki, Taichi and El Desperado) defeated Los Ingobernables de Japón (Sanada, Evil, Shingo Takagi and Bushi) by submission	Eight-man tag team match	8:39
6	Chaos (Hirooki Goto, Tomohiro Ishii, Toru Yano and Yoshi-Hashi) defeated Bullet Club (Kenta, Bad Luck Fale, Yujiro Takahashi and Chase Owens) (with Pieter)	Eight-man tag team match	8:17
7	FinJuice (Juice Robinson and David Finlay) defeated Guerrillas of Destiny (Tama Tonga and Tanga Loa) (c) (with Jado)	Tag team match for the IWGP Tag Team Championship	13:25
8	Jon Moxley defeated Lance Archer (c) by knockout	Texas Death match for the IWGP United States Heavyweight Championship; Victory could only be attained by ten-count knockout or submission.	14:26
9	Hiromu Takahashi defeated Will Ospreay (c)	Singles match for the IWGP Junior Heavyweight Championship	24:33
10	Tetsuya Naito defeated Jay White (c) (with Gedo)	Singles match for the IWGP Intercontinental Championship	33:54
11	Kazuchika Okada (c) defeated Kota Ibushi	Singles match for the IWGP Heavyweight Championship	39:16
(c) / – the champion(s) heading into the match; D / – this was a dark match; P / – the match was broadcast on the pre-show

Night 2
No.	Results	Stipulations	Times
1^{P}	Los Ingobernables de Japón (Evil, Shingo Takagi and Bushi) defeated Taguchi Japan (Togi Makabe, Toru Yano and Ryusuke Taguchi) (c), Chaos (Tomohiro Ishii, Yoshi-Hashi and Robbie Eagles), Suzuki-gun (Taichi, El Desperado and Yoshinobu Kanemaru) and Bullet Club (Bad Luck Fale, Yujiro Takahashi and Chase Owens)	Gauntlet match for the NEVER Openweight 6-Man Tag Team Championship	19:34
2	Hiromu Takahashi and Ryu Lee defeated Jushin Thunder Liger and Naoki Sano (with Yoshiaki Fujiwara)	Tag team match This was Jushin Thunder Liger's retirement match.	12:16
3	Roppongi 3K (Sho and Yoh) (with Rocky Romero) defeated Bullet Club (Taiji Ishimori and El Phantasmo) (c)	Tag team match for the IWGP Junior Heavyweight Tag Team Championship	14:08
4	Zack Sabre Jr. (c) defeated Sanada	Singles match for the British Heavyweight Championship	12:32
5	Jon Moxley (c) defeated Juice Robinson (with David Finlay)	Singles match for the IWGP United States Heavyweight Championship	12:48
6	Hirooki Goto defeated Kenta (c)	Singles match for the NEVER Openweight Championship	16:12
7	Jay White (with Gedo) defeated Kota Ibushi	Singles match	24:58
8	Chris Jericho defeated Hiroshi Tanahashi by submission	Singles match Had Tanahashi won, he would've received a match for Jericho's AEW World Championship.	22:24
9	Tetsuya Naito (IWGP Intercontinental) defeated Kazuchika Okada (IWGP Heavyweight)	Double Gold Dash match for the IWGP Heavyweight Championship and IWGP Intercontinental Championship	35:37
(c) / – the champion(s) heading into the match; P / – the match was broadcast on the pre-show

=== Six-man tag team gauntlet match eliminations ===
Eliminated	Team	Wrestler	Entered	Eliminated by	Method	Time
1	Bullet Club (Bad Luck Fale, Yujiro Takahashi and Chase Owens)	Owens	1	Ishii	Pinfall	3:40
2	Suzuki-gun (Taichi, El Desperado and Yoshinobu Kanemaru)	Kanemaru	3	Eagles	Pinfall	3:54
3	Chaos (Tomohiro Ishii, Yoshi-Hashi and Robbie Eagles)	Ishii	2	Evil	Pinfall	5:52
4	Taguchi Japan (Togi Makabe, Toru Yano and Ryusuke Taguchi)	Taguchi	5	Takagi	Pinfall	6:08
Winners	Los Ingobernables de Japón (Evil, Shingo Takagi and Bushi)		4	—N/a		

== See also ==
- 2020 in professional wrestling
- Professional wrestling at the Tokyo Dome
- List of NJPW pay-per-view events
