= New Year Dash!! (2020) =

2020 professional wrestling event produced by New Japan Pro-Wrestling

- Event poster featuring Jushin Thunder Liger
- Promotion: New Japan Pro-Wrestling
- Date: January 6, 2020
- City: Tokyo, Japan
- Venue: Ota City General Gymnasium
- Attendance: 4,078

Event chronology
← Previous; Wrestle Kingdom 14	Next → Fantastica Mania

New Year Dash!! chronology
← Previous; 2019	Next → 2021

New Year Dash!! (2020) was a professional wrestling pay-per-view (PPV) event produced by New Japan Pro-Wrestling (NJPW). It took place on January 6, 2020, one day after Wrestle Kingdom 14.

The event featured the retirement ceremony of Japanese wrestling legend Jushin Thunder Liger.

== Production ==
Other on-screen personnel
Role:	Name:
English commentators	Gino Gambino
English commentators	Kevin Kelly
English commentators	Chris Charlton
English commentators	Rocky Romero
Japanese commentators	Yohei Onishi
Japanese commentators	Milano Collection A.T.
Japanese commentators	Yusuke Okamoto
Ring announcers	Kimihiko Ozaki
Ring announcers	Makoto Abe
Referees	Jeremy Marcus
Referees	Kenta Sato
Referees	Marty Asami
Referees	Red Shoes Unno
Referees	Tiger Hattori

=== Background ===
New Year Dash!! was announced to be coming to Ōta on September 26, 2019, and was described as the "biggest New Year!! Dash" ever. The event featured blow-off matches for the previous night's Wrestle Kingdom 14 and as is tradition, all matches were revealed the night of the event.

=== Storylines ===
New Year Dash!! featured professional wrestling matches that involved different wrestlers from pre-existing scripted feuds and storylines. Wrestlers portrayed villains, heroes, or less distinguishable characters in the scripted events that build tension and culminated in a wrestling match or series of matches.

The previous night at Wrestle Kingdom 14, the IWGP Intercontinental Champion Tetsuya Naito defeated Kazuchika Okada to win the IWGP Heavyweight Championship becoming the first ever dual IWGP Heavyweight and Intercontinental champion. After the match, he was attacked by Kenta, setting up the main event for New Year Dash!! as Naito and Los Ingobernables de Japón teammate Sanada would take on Kenta and his Bullet Club partner Jay White.

== Results ==
No.	Results	Stipulations	Times
1	Alex Coughlin, Clark Connors, and Karl Fredericks defeated Yuya Uemura, Yota Tsuji, and Toa Henare by submission	Six-man tag team match	10:40
2	Suzuki-gun (Yoshinobu Kanemaru and El Desperado) defeated Roppongi 3K (Sho and Yoh), Los Ingobernables de Japón (Bushi and Hiromu Takahashi), and Bullet Club's Cutest Tag Team (El Phantasmo and Taiji Ishimori)	Fatal 4-way tag team match	13:29
3	Kota Ibushi, Hiroshi Tanahashi and FinJuice (David Finlay, and Juice Robinson) defeated Bullet Club O.G. (Chase Owens, Bad Luck Fale and Guerillas of Destiny (Tanga Loa, and Tama Tonga)) (with Jado)	Eight-man tag team match	11:39
4	Los Ingobernables de Japón (Shingo Takagi and Evil) defeated Chaos (Tomohiro Ishii and Hirooki Goto)	Tag team match	16:28
5	Chaos (Birds of Prey (Robbie Eagles and Will Ospreay) and Chaos Ride the Lightning (Yoshi-Hashi and Kazuchika Okada)) defeated Suzuki-gun (Taichi, Lance Archer, Zack Sabre Jr., and Minoru Suzuki) by disqualification	Eight-man tag team match	15:27
6	Los Ingobernables de Japón (Sanada and Tetsuya Naito) defeated Bullet Club (Jay White and Kenta) (with Gedo)	Tag team match	13:58

== See also ==
- 2020 in professional wrestling
- List of NJPW pay-per-view events
