= NJPW Showdown =

2019 New Japan Pro-Wrestling event

New Japan Showdown
- Promotion: New Japan Pro-Wrestling
- Date: November 9, 2019; November 11, 2019
- City: San Jose, California; Los Angeles, California
- Venue: San Jose Civic; Globe Theatre
- Attendance: 2,027 (San Jose); 529 (Los Angeles)

Event chronology
← Previous; Power Struggle	Next → World Tag League 2019; Wrestle Kingdom 14

New Japan Showdown chronology
← Previous; First	Next → 2020

New Japan Showdown was a two-day professional wrestling event promoted by New Japan Pro-Wrestling (NJPW). The event took place on November 9, 2019 at the San Jose Civic in San Jose, California and on November 11, 2019 at the Globe Theater in Los Angeles, California. The San Jose show was broadcast live on NJPW World, while the Los Angeles show was later available to on-demand viewing.

== Results ==
=== Night 1: San Jose ===
No.	Results	Stipulations	Times
1	Ren Narita defeated Alex Coughlin	Singles match	7:43
2	Toru Yano and Colt Cabana defeated Jyushin Thunder Liger (Note: This was Jyushin Thunder Liger's last professional wrestling match in the United States.) and Aaron Solow	Tag team match	8:01
3	Suzuki-gun (Minoru Suzuki and El Desperado) defeated Karl Fredericks and Clark Connors	Tag team match	9:56
4	Tomohiro Ishii, Juice Robinson and TJP defeated Los Ingobernables de Japón (Evil, Sanada and Bushi)	Six-man tag team match	11:58
5	Chaos (Hirooki Goto, Yoh and Rocky Romero) defeated Bullet Club (Kenta, Taiji Ishimori and Jado)	Six-man tag team match	11:00
6	El Phantasmo (c) defeated Sho	Singles match for the British Cruiserweight Championship	20:23
7	Lance Archer (c) defeated David Finlay	Singles match for the IWGP United States Heavyweight Championship	13:10
8	Los Ingobernables de Japón (Tetsuya Naito and Shingo Takagi) defeated Bullet Club (Jay White and Chase Owens)	Tag team match	15:37
9	Chaos (Kazuchika Okada and Will Ospreay) defeated Kota Ibushi and Amazing Red	Tag team match	15:35
(c) / – the champion(s) heading into the match

=== Night 2: Los Angeles ===
No.	Results	Stipulations	Times
1	Amazing Red and TJP defeated Alex Zayne and Aaron Solow	Tag team match	10:24
2	Toru Yano and Colt Cabana defeated Karl Fredericks and Alex Coughlin	Tag team match	8:47
3	Suzuki-gun (Minoru Suzuki, Lance Archer and El Desperado) defeated Juice Robinson, David Finlay and Clark Connors	Six-man tag team match	10:24
4	Los Ingobernables de Japón (Evil and Sanada) defeated Chaos (Tomohiro Ishii and Rocky Romero) by submission	Tag team match	11:22
5	Kota Ibushi defeated Ren Narita by submission	Singles match	9:26
6	Chaos (Hirooki Goto, Sho and Yoh) defeated Bullet Club (Kenta, Taiji Ishimori and El Phantasmo)	Six-man tag team match	13:30
7	Los Ingobernables de Japón (Tetsuya Naito, Shingo Takagi and Bushi) defeated Bullet Club (Jay White, Chase Owens and Gedo)	Six-man tag team match	17:24

== See also ==
- 2019 in professional wrestling
