= Power Struggle (2019) =

2019 New Japan Pro-Wrestling event

- Promotional poster of the event
- Promotion: New Japan Pro-Wrestling
- Date: November 3, 2019
- City: Osaka, Japan
- Venue: Osaka Prefectural Gymnasium
- Attendance: 5,558

Event chronology
← Previous; King of Pro-Wrestling; Road to Power Struggle	Next → New Japan Showdown

Power Struggle chronology
← Previous; 2018	Next → 2020

Power Struggle (2019) was a professional wrestling event promoted by New Japan Pro-Wrestling (NJPW). It took place on November 3, 2019, in Osaka, Osaka, at the Osaka Prefectural Gymnasium. It was the ninth event under the Power Struggle name.

== Storylines ==
Power Struggle featured nine professional wrestling matches that involved different wrestlers from pre-existing scripted feuds and storylines. Wrestlers portrayed villains, heroes, or less distinguishable characters in the scripted events that built tension and culminated in a wrestling match or series of matches.

== Results ==
No.	Results	Stipulations	Times
1	Volador Jr., Titán, TJP and Clark Connors defeated Jyushin Thunder Liger, Tiger Mask, Ryusuke Taguchi and Yuya Uemura	Eight-man tag team match	5:43
2	Bullet Club (Taiji Ishimori and El Phantasmo) defeated Chaos (Rocky Romero and Robbie Eagles)	Tag team match	8:42
3	Los Ingobernables de Japón (Evil, Sanada and Shingo Takagi) defeated Suzuki-gun (Minoru Suzuki, Zack Sabre Jr. and Lance Archer)	Six-man tag team match	9:07
4	Kota Ibushi and Hiroshi Tanahashi defeated Chaos (Kazuchika Okada and Yoshi-Hashi)	Tag team match	10:51
5	Tetsuya Naito defeated Taichi	Singles match	12:56
6	Roppongi 3K (Sho and Yoh) defeated Suzuki-gun (El Desperado and Yoshinobu Kanemaru)	Tag team match; 2019 Super Jr. Tag League final	14:13
7	Kenta (c) defeated Tomohiro Ishii	Singles match for the NEVER Openweight Championship	20:12
8	Will Ospreay (c) defeated Bushi	Singles match for the IWGP Junior Heavyweight Championship	16:20
9	Jay White (c) defeated Hirooki Goto	Singles match for the IWGP Intercontinental Championship	27:40
(c) / – the champion(s) heading into the match
