= Lance Archer =

American professional wrestler (born 1977)

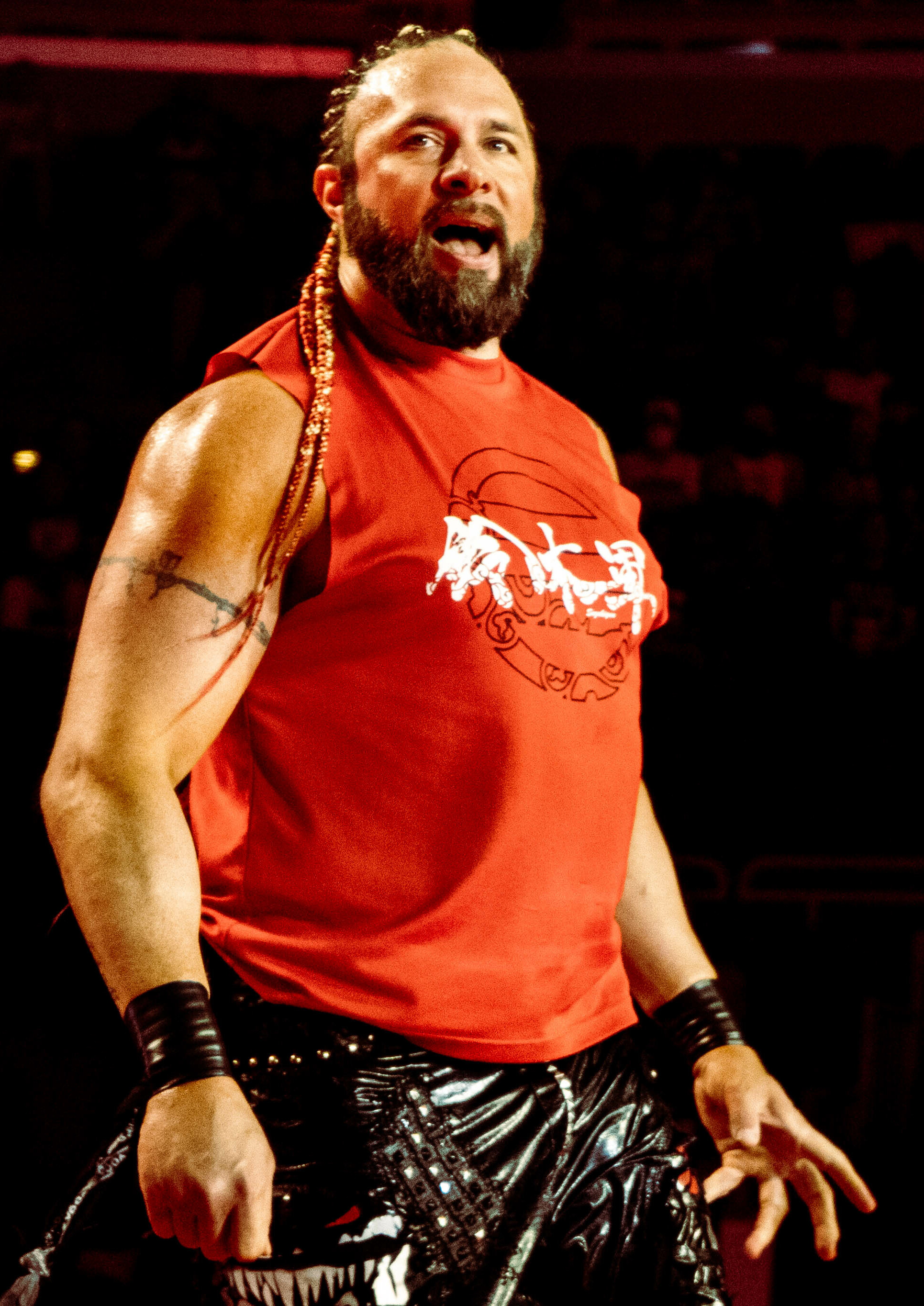
- Archer in June 2022

Personal information
- Born: Lance Hoyt; February 28, 1977 (age 49) Hearne, Texas, U.S.
- Education: Texas State University

Professional wrestling career
- Ring name(s): Lance Archer; Lance Hoyt; Lance Rock; Lance Steel; Shadow; Dallas; Vance Archer
- Billed height: 6 ft 8 in (203 cm)
- Billed weight: 289 lb (131 kg)
- Billed from: Austin, Texas; Dallas, Texas; Hearne, Texas
- Trained by: Solo Faitala
- Debut: July 2000

Lance Hoyt (born February 28, 1977), better known by his ring name Lance Archer, is an American professional wrestler. He is signed to All Elite Wrestling (AEW), where is a member of The Don Callis Family. He also makes appearances for New Japan Pro-Wrestling (NJPW), where he is a former two-time IWGP United States Heavyweight Champion. He is also known for his time with WWE as Vance Archer, and Impact Wrestling (TNA) under his real name and as Lance Rock.

Hoyt began his career in 2000 and worked in Total Nonstop Action Wrestling (TNA) from 2004 until 2009. In TNA, he wrestled first as Dallas, winning the NWA World Tag Team Championship twice with Kid Kash. After Diamond Dallas Page signed with TNA, he changed his name to Lance Hoyt and formed a rock band themed tag team with Jimmy Rave and Christy Hemme, the Rock N Rave Infection, eventually changing his name to Lance Rock in 2008. After Hoyt left TNA, he signed with WWE, where he worked until 2010 as Vance Archer. After he left WWE, he signed a contract with Japanese promotion New Japan Pro-Wrestling, where he worked as Lance Archer. During his first years, he joined Minoru Suzuki's Suzuki-Gun, winning the G1 Tag League 2011 with Suzuki. When Davey Boy Smith Jr. came to NJPW, they were paired as Killer Elite Squad, winning between 2014 and 2019 the IWGP Tag Team Championship twice, NWA World Tag Team Championship twice and NOAH'S GHC Tag Team Championship twice. When Smith left the promotion in 2019, Archer became a singles wrestler, capturing the IWGP United States Heavyweight Championship, a championship which he eventually regained for a record-tying second time in 2021. In February 2020, it was announced that Archer had joined All Elite Wrestling, though he remained making appearances for NJPW.

== Professional wrestling career ==
=== Early career (2000–2009) ===
In 2000, Hoyt began training as a wrestler under Solo Faitala, and debuted in July 2000, facing Tarzan Taylor in his first match. He spent the next four years working on the Texas independent circuit, using the ring names "Lance Steel" and "Breakdown", the latter being a character created in the spur-of-the-moment by Hoyt in Corpus Christi, Texas when he had forgotten his usual ring attire and was forced to wrestle in his street clothing.

Hoyt's most notable tenure on the Texas independent circuit was in Professional Championship Wrestling (PCW), where he debuted in 2000 as "Shadow", a dark heel character. Throughout his time in PCW, he faced notable opponents including Paul London, Jeromy Sage, and Ahmed Johnson and early in his tenure, he created a stable called "The Dark Circle". Hoyt later left PCW upon signing with Total Nonstop Action Wrestling (TNA) before later making his returned to the promotion in 2006 under his real name, while using his former Shadow ring name simply as a nickname. Soon after his return to PCW, Hoyt proceeded to win the Tag Team Championship with Wally Darkmon in 2006. Beginning in 2008, Hoyt reverted to his Shadow ring name and gimmick, while also adopting a mask. This was short-lived, however, as Hoyt unmasked and suddenly began using his Rock 'n Rave Infection gimmick from TNA a few months later. Following his release from TNA, PCW announced they had released Hoyt from his contract, which turned out to be a storyline, leading to Hoyt revealing he had a PCW "legends contract". Hoyt briefly went on become the commissioner of PCW before it was announced that he had signed a contract with World Wrestling Entertainment.

=== Total Nonstop Action Wrestling (2004–2009) ===
==== Debut and singles competition (2004–2007) ====
Hoyt was hired by Total Nonstop Action Wrestling (TNA) in March 2004 and immediately teamed up with X Division mainstay Kid Kash as Dallas, Kash's bodyguard, tag team partner and on-screen relative. He and Kash took part in a tournament for the vacant NWA World Tag Team Championship and won the vacant titles by defeating Low Ki and Christopher Daniels in the finals on April 7. They lost the titles to D'Lo Brown and Apolo the subsequent week, then regained them from Brown and Apolo the week following that. Their second and final reign ended on June 4 of that year when they were defeated by America's Most Wanted.

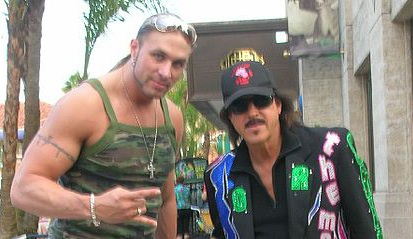
Hoyt posing with Jimmy Hart

After Kash was suspended by TNA in June 2004, Hoyt was reduced to wrestling dark matches. He appeared sporadically with TNA throughout the remainder of the year, and aided Kash in his feud with A.J. Styles upon his return from suspension. In January 2005, Hoyt began wrestling under his own name at the instruction of booker Dusty Rhodes. The common explanation for this is that they wanted no confusion between Hoyt and Diamond Dallas Page. Hoyt and Kash competed in the tag team division, unsuccessfully challenging America's Most Wanted for the NWA World Tag Team Championship at Against All Odds on February 13, until Kash was released by TNA on April 19, 2005. Left without a partner, Hoyt teamed with Chris Candido to face Sonny Siaki and Apolo in a cage match at Lockdown. In the course of the match, Candido suffered a serious leg injury and was stretchered out, and Hoyt was pinned shortly thereafter. Following the match, Candido's cohorts, The Naturals, attacked Hoyt, thus turning him into a face character.

Hoyt began developing a strong fan following, leading to his introducing a gimmick known as "Hoytamania", a reference to the "Hulkamania" surrounding Hulk Hogan. He feuded with Team Canada throughout mid-2005, and lost to Abyss at Sacrifice. He lost to Monty Brown at Bound for Glory and was involved in the 10-man Gauntlet match later in the night to determine the number one contender for Jeff Jarrett's NWA World Heavyweight Championship. In that match, Hoyt was eliminated by eventual winner Rhino. He later began teaming with Matt Bentley in mid-card tag matches until a misinterpreted steel chair incident led Bentley to believe Hoyt had "screwed" him, and he severely turned on him with a spontaneous brawl by ringside, consisting of several chairshots. Hoyt defeated Bentley at Destination X. He returned to TNA at No Surrender in the Triple Chance Tag Team battle royal as a partner to Ron "The Truth" Killings, but he was one of the first eliminated from the match. Hoyt made his Spike TV return, teaming with Killings to defeat Matt Bentley and Kazarian.

Hoyt participated in the Fight for the Right Tournament, where he was one of the last two remaining men, making it to the third stage of the match. He lost to Abyss, who won a bye to the tournament finals for a shot at the NWA World Heavyweight Championship. Even so, he wrestled Ron Killings in the quarterfinals of the tournament on the November 2 episode of Impact!, but was defeated. At Genesis, Hoyt and Killings defeated Austin Starr and Alex Shelley with Kevin Nash at ringside.

==== The Rock 'n Rave Infection (2007–2009) ====
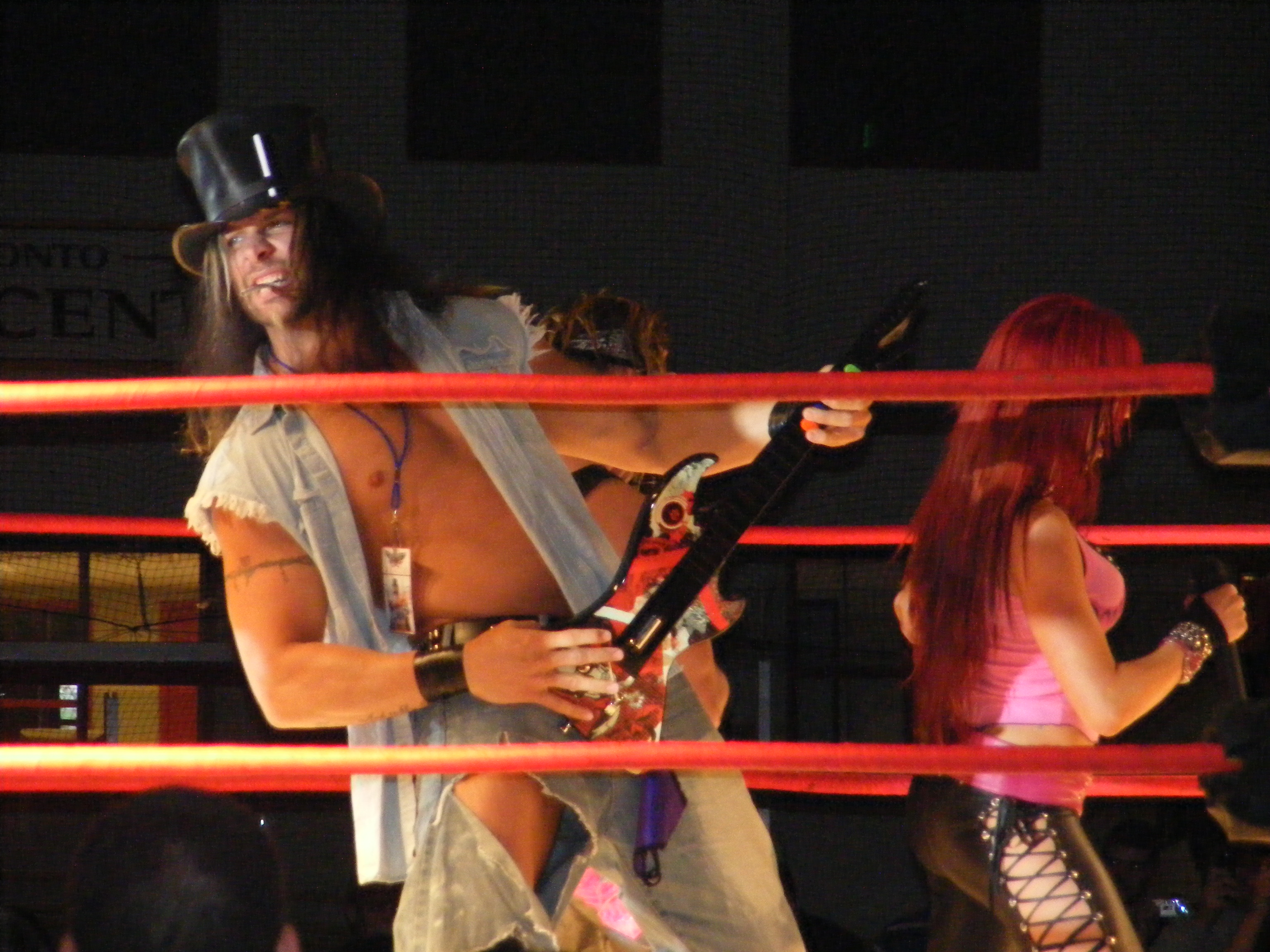
Hoyt in The Rock 'n Rave Infection with Christy Hemme

After Killings was given a new program, Hoyt started teaming up with the Voodoo Kin Mafia (VKM). His role with the team seemed to be that of a friend and bodyguard, watching their backs during their matches, and working the occasional six-man tag team match with them on Impact!. At Slammiversary, VKM defeated Basham and Damaja when Kip James pinned Basham, but Hoyt turned his back on VKM when Kip was about to attack Christy Hemme. He kissed Hemme after the match, thus re-establishing himself as a heel. Hoyt lost to Abyss on an episode of Impact! and a week after that he lost to Kip James. He then became part of a tag team managed by Hemme alongside the returning Jimmy Rave, later named The Rock 'n Rave Infection. They soon became a comedic rock band trio, with Hoyt and Rave entering the ring with Guitar Hero game controllers and Hemme screaming on a microphone.

Hoyt competed at Lockdown in a "Cuffed in the Cage" match losing to the eventual winner, Super Eric. He changed his ringname to Lance Rock on the July 17 episode of Impact!, where he defeated Matt Morgan shortly after Morgan.

Since then, The Rock 'n Rave Infection defeated the teams of Abyss and Matt Morgan, Latin American Xchange, and The Prince Justice Brotherhood (Super Eric, Shark Boy, and Curry Man), the latter of whom soon began a feud with The Rock 'n Rave Infection. On February 10, 2009, Hoyt was released from his TNA contract. He wrestled his last match in TNA on the February 26 edition of Impact!, teaming with Rave and losing to Beer Money, Inc. in an "Off the Wagon Challenge".

=== World Wrestling Entertainment (2009–2010) ===
After a brief stint in All Japan Pro Wrestling as a member of the Voodoo Murders, on April 26, 2009, Hoyt announced he had signed a deal with World Wrestling Entertainment (WWE). He wrestled in WWE's developmental promotion Florida Championship Wrestling (FCW) under the ring name Lance Archer, after his father. For his first match, he teamed up with Jon Cutler and was defeated by Duke Rotundo and Vic Adams. His ring name was then tweaked to Vance Archer.

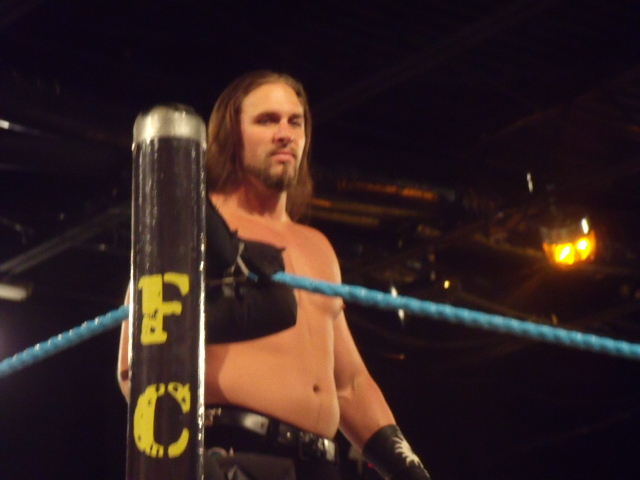
Hoyt as Vance Archer in FCW

On the November 3 episode of ECW, Hoyt, now clean shaven and sporting both a short haircut and new attire, made his WWE debut under his Vance Archer ring name as a heel, defeating Logan Jones in a squash match. After defeating several enhancement talents over the following weeks, Archer defeated Tommy Dreamer on the December 8 episode of ECW. Archer continued his winning streak when he once again defeated Dreamer on the December 17, 2009, episode of WWE Superstars. On the December 22 episode of ECW, Archer defeated Goldust in an "ECW Homecoming" qualifying match to advance to a battle royal where the winner would face the ECW Champion Christian at Royal Rumble for the ECW Championship. He then started a feud with Shelton Benjamin, which saw Archer lose to him via disqualification on the December 31 episode of Superstars. However, Archer's unpinned streak was left intact. On the January 12, 2010, episode of ECW, Archer was unable to win the "Homecoming Battle Royal" as he was eliminated by Benjamin. The next week on Superstars, Archer was defeated by Benjamin, thus breaking his streak of not being pinned. The two continued to exchange victories, as Archer defeated Benjamin on the February 2 episode of ECW while Benjamin defeated Archer in a no disqualification match the following week. At WrestleMania XXVI, Archer competed in a 26-man pre-show battle royal where he was eliminated.

Following the disbanding of the ECW brand, Archer competed in dark matches and in FCW, and was eventually moved to the SmackDown brand, forming a tag team with Curt Hawkins. They made their television debut as a team on the May 13 episode of Superstars, defeating two local competitors. After the match, Hawkins stated that he and Archer had been given a 30-day contract to "make an impact". The team made its SmackDown debut on the May 21 episode, winning another squash match. In an attempt to make an impact, the duo attacked Montel Vontavious Porter (MVP) and Christian on consecutive episodes of SmackDown on June 4 and June 11, which they followed up on by defeating both in a tag team match on June 18. The next week the duo was officially named "The Gatecrashers". On the June 25 episode of Smackdown, The Gatecrashers and Dolph Ziggler lost to Christian, MVP and Kofi Kingston in a six man tag team match. On the July 9 episode of Smackdown, The Gatecrashers defeated Christian and Matt Hardy. On the August 5 episode of WWE Superstars, The Gatecrashers defeated Trent Barreta and Caylen Croft. On the August 19 episode of Superstars after Archer's match with MVP ended in a no contest and a tag team match was made where The Gatecrashers defeated MVP and JTG. On the August 26 episode of Superstars. The Gatecrashers lost to Trent Barreta and Caylen Croft. On the September 9 episode of Superstars, The Gatecrashers lost a rematch to Caylen Croft and Trent Barreta. On the September 24 episode of Smackdown, The Gatecrashers lost to Big Show in a handicap match.

The team came to an end on the October 7 episode of Superstars after a match between Archer and Chris Masters. Archer accidentally struck Hawkins outside the ring, after which the two argued and a distracted Archer lost the match. Afterwards, Hawkins assaulted Archer. Archer returned to singles competition on the November 4 edition of Superstars, losing to Luke Gallows.

On November 19, 2010, Archer was released from his contract along with five other wrestlers.

=== New Japan Pro-Wrestling (2011–2015) ===
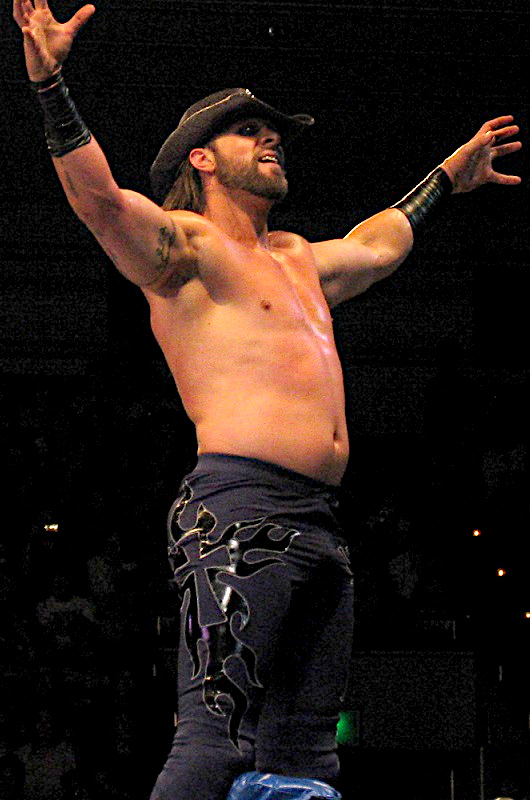
Archer in 2011, on tour with New Japan

On May 15, 2011, Hoyt made his debut for New Japan Pro-Wrestling, during the promotion's first-ever tour of the United States, attacking Satoshi Kojima after a match. The following day it was announced that Hoyt, under the ring name Lance Archer, had joined Minoru Suzuki's Suzuki-gun, who had recently begun feuding with Kojima. Archer made his in-ring debut on June 18 at Dominion 6.18 in Osaka, teaming with Suzuki in a tag team match, where they defeated Kojima and Togi Makabe. Three days later, the Suzuki-gun team of Archer, Taichi and Taka Michinoku was eliminated from the J Sports Crown Openweight 6 Man Tag Tournament in the first round by Kojima, Makabe and Tomoaki Honma. In August, Archer took part in the 2011 G1 Climax, where he managed to win four out of his nine matches, including defeating former IWGP Heavyweight Champion Togi Makabe in his opening match, finishing eighth out of the ten wrestlers in his block. Archer had his to date highest profile match in New Japan on September 19, when he was defeated by Togi Makabe. In the 2011 G1 Tag League, Archer teamed with Minoru Suzuki and, after four wins and one loss, the team finished second in their block, advancing to the semifinals of the tournament. On November 6, Archer and Suzuki first defeated the CHAOS Top Team (Shinsuke Nakamura and Toru Yano) in the semifinals and then IWGP Tag Team Champions Bad Intentions (Giant Bernard and Karl Anderson) in the finals to win the 2011 G1 Tag League. On November 12 at Power Struggle, Archer and Suzuki failed in their attempt to capture the IWGP Tag Team Championship from Bad Intentions. On February 12, 2012, at The New Beginning, Archer, Minoru Suzuki, Taichi, Taka Michinoku and Yoshihiro Takayama of the Suzuki-gun took a dominant 5–1 win over Kushida, Tiger Mask, Togi Makabe, Wataru Inoue and Yuji Nagata in a ten-man elimination tag team match, with Archer scoring eliminations over Kushida, Tiger Mask and Inoue. Afterwards, Archer and Takayama challenged Tencozy (Hiroyoshi Tenzan and Satoshi Kojima) to a match for the IWGP Tag Team Championship. On March 18, Archer and Takayama were unsuccessful in their title challenge. On July 22 at Kizuna Road, Archer, Suzuki, Michinoku and Taichi defeated Prince Devitt, Ryusuke Taguchi, Togi Makabe and Yuji Nagata in an eight-man elimination tag team match, with Archer scoring three of his team's four eliminations. Following the match, Archer had a staredown with Makabe, building up to their upcoming match in the 2012 G1 Climax tournament. The match took place on August 1, the first day of the tournament, and saw Archer pick up the win over the former IWGP Heavyweight Champion for the second year in a row. After four wins and three losses, Archer headed to the final day of the tournament on August 12 tied at the top of his block, however, a loss to MVP in his final match caused him to get eliminated from the finals.

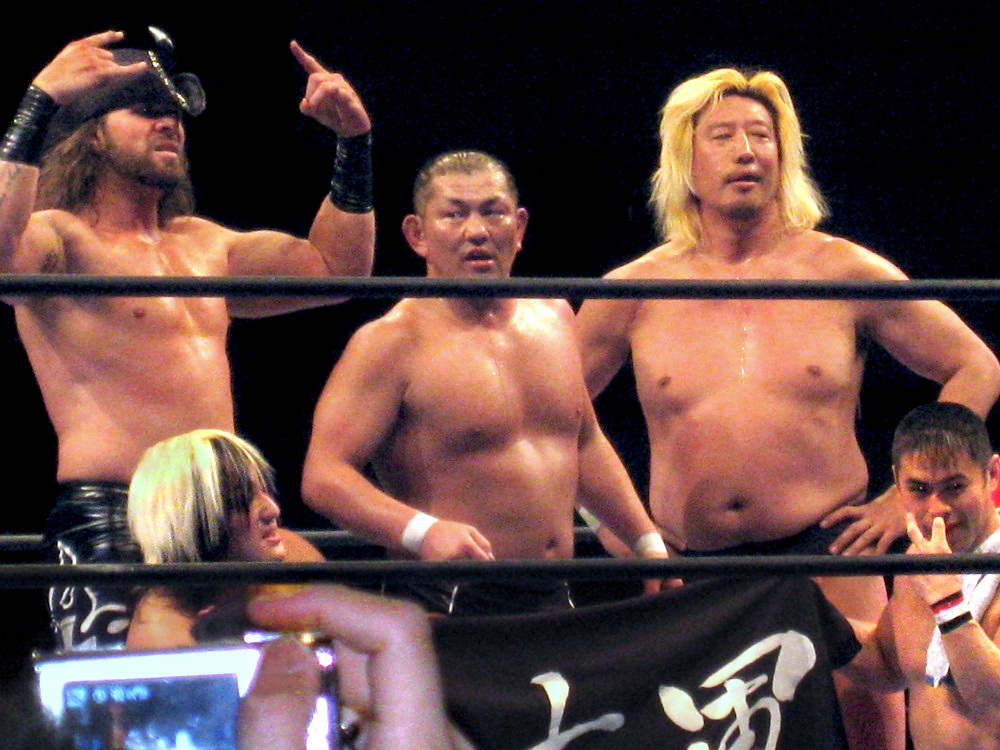
Archer with Suzuki-gun in February 2012

In the aftermath of Suzuki-gun's July 22 win, Archer had also made a challenge for the IWGP Tag Team Championship, held by Hiroyoshi Tenzan and Satoshi Kojima, but did not specify who his partner for the match would be. On August 13, Harry Smith, later renamed Davey Boy Smith, Jr., was revealed as Archer's partner and the newest member of Suzuki-gun. On October 8 at King of Pro-Wrestling, Archer and Smith, now known as the K.E.S. (Killer Elite Squad), defeated Kojima and Tenzan to win the IWGP Tag Team Championship. K.E.S. made their first successful title defense on November 11 at Power Struggle, defeating Tenzan and Kojima in a rematch. From November 20 to December 1, K.E.S. took part in the round-robin portion of the 2012 World Tag League, finishing with a record of four wins and two losses, advancing to the semifinals of the tournament in the second place in their group. On December 2, K.E.S. defeated Always Hypers (Togi Makabe and Wataru Inoue) to advance to the finals of the tournament, Archer's second in a row. Later that same day, K.E.S. was defeated in the finals of the 2012 World Tag League by Sword & Guns (Hirooki Goto and Karl Anderson). On January 4, 2013, at Wrestle Kingdom 7 in Tokyo Dome, K.E.S. defeated Sword & Guns in a rematch to retain the IWGP Tag Team Championship. On February 10 at The New Beginning, Archer and Smith defeated Tenzan and Kojima for their third successful defense of the IWGP Tag Team Championship. On March 3 at New Japan's 41st anniversary event, Archer unsuccessfully challenged Shinsuke Nakamura for the IWGP Intercontinental Championship. On April 5, Archer and Smith made their fourth successful defense of the IWGP Tag Team Championship against Nakamura and Tomohiro Ishii. On April 20, Archer and Smith defeated Ryan Genesis and Scot Summers in Houston, Texas, to not only retain the IWGP Tag Team Championship, but to also win the NWA World Tag Team Championship. On May 3 at Wrestling Dontaku 2013, K.E.S. lost the IWGP Tag Team Championship back to Tencozy in a four-way match, which also included Takashi Iizuka and Toru Yano, and Manabu Nakanishi and Strong Man, though neither Archer nor Smith was involved in the finish. K.E.S. received a rematch for the title on June 22 at Dominion 6.22 in a three-way match, which also included Iizuka and Yano, but were unable to regain the title, when Kojima pinned Archer for the win. On August 1, Archer entered the 2013 G1 Climax. The tournament concluded on August 11 with a match, where Archer defeated his tag team partner Davey Boy Smith, Jr., costing Smith a spot in the finals and giving Archer a record of four wins and five losses. On November 9 at Power Struggle, K.E.S. faced Tencozy and The IronGodz (Jax Dane and Rob Conway) in a two-fall three-way match. In the first fall, they lost the NWA World Tag Team Championship to The IronGodz, but came back in the second to defeat Tencozy for the IWGP Tag Team Championship. From November 24 to December 8, K.E.S. took part in the 2013 World Tag League. After winning their round-robin block with a record of five wins and one loss, they were eliminated from the tournament in the semifinals by their old rivals, Tencozy. On January 4, 2014, at Wrestle Kingdom 8 in Tokyo Dome, K.E.S. lost the IWGP Tag Team Championship to the winners of the tournament, Bullet Club (Doc Gallows and Karl Anderson). K.E.S. received a rematch for the title on February 9 at The New Beginning in Hiroshima, but were again defeated by Bullet Club. On May 25 at Back to the Yokohama Arena, K.E.S. failed to regain the NWA World Tag Team Championship from Tencozy in a three-way match, which also included Rob Conway and Wes Brisco. On June 21 at Dominion 6.21, K.E.S. received another shot at the NWA World Tag Team Championship, this time in a regular tag team match, but were again defeated by Tencozy. From July 23 to August 8, Archer took part in the 2014 G1 Climax, where he finished tied sixth in his block with a record of four wins and six losses. On October 13 at King of Pro-Wrestling, K.E.S. defeated Tencozy to regain the NWA World Tag Team Championship. From November 22 to December 5, K.E.S. took part in the 2014 World Tag League. The team finished their block with a record of four wins and three losses, narrowly missing the finals of the tournament.

=== Independents ===
In 2012 he was the headline act of a tour of Victoria, Australia that was titled 'The American Psycho Tour'. Here Lance won the Gippsland Pro Wrestling Heavyweight championship from Andy Rhodes before defending against other Australian wrestlers on the tour. He lost the title back to Andy Rhodes at the Moe Hotel at the end of the tour.

=== Pro Wrestling Noah (2015–2016) ===
On January 10, 2015, K.E.S., along with the rest of Suzuki-gun, took part in a major storyline, where the stable invaded a Pro Wrestling Noah show. During the attack, K.E.S. beat down GHC Tag Team Champions TMDK (Mikey Nicholls and Shane Haste). This led to a match on February 11, where K.E.S. defeated TMDK to become the new GHC Tag Team Champions. In May, K.E.S. made it to the finals of the 2015 Global Tag League, where they were defeated by Masato Tanaka and Takashi Sugiura. After ten successful title defenses, K.E.S. lost the GHC Tag Team Championship to Naomichi Marufuji and Toru Yano on May 28, 2016. K.E.S. regained the title from Marufuji and Yano on November 23. They lost the title to Go Shiozaki and Maybach Taniguchi on December 3. Two days later, it was announced that Suzuki-gun was gone from Noah, concluding the invasion storyline.

=== Global Force Wrestling (2015) ===
On May 6, 2015, Global Force Wrestling (GFW) announced Hoyt as part of their roster. He made his debut for the promotion on August 14, losing to Nick Aldis. On August 21, K.E.S lost to Bullet Club (Doc Gallows and Karl Anderson) in the quarter-finals of the GFW tag team title tournament.

=== Return to NJPW (2017–present) ===
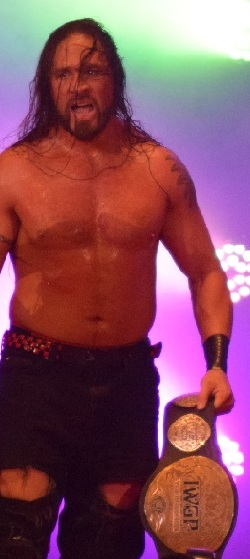
Archer as IWPG Tag Team Champion in 2017

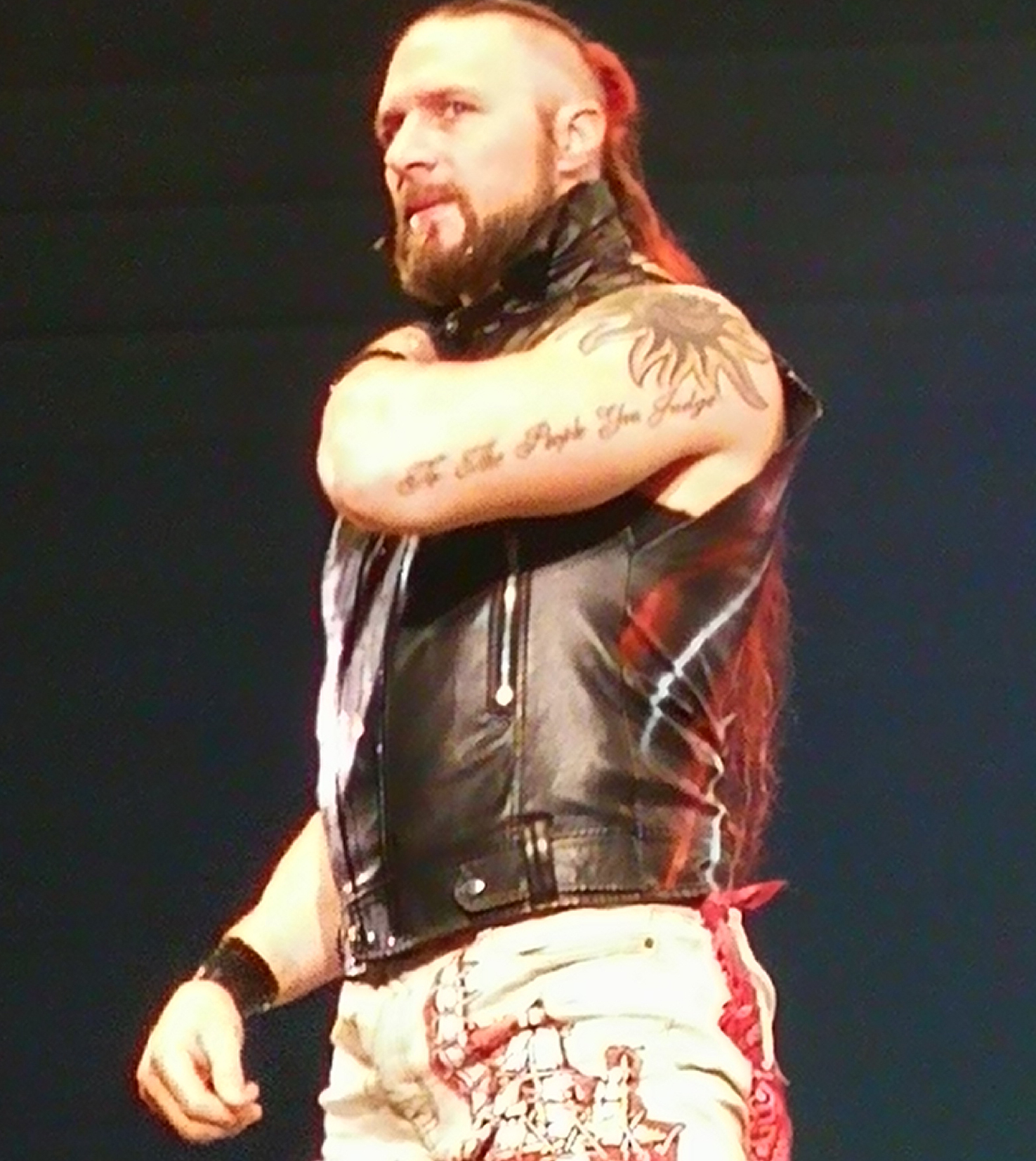
Archer in August 2019

The entire Suzuki-gun returned to NJPW on January 5, 2017, attacking the Chaos stable with K.E.S. targeting IWGP Tag Team Champions Tomohiro Ishii and Toru Yano. On February 5 at The New Beginning in Sapporo, K.E.S. unsuccessfully challenged Ishii and Yano for the IWGP Tag Team Championship in a three-way match, also involving Togi Makabe and Tomoaki Honma. Following the event, Archer was sidelined with a herniated disc in his lower back, which would require surgery and sideline him for a significant amount of time. After this injury, Archer changed his Blackout finisher to avoid a future injury. Instead of a sitout reverse crucifix powerbomb, he began to perform a reverse crucifix powerbomb.

Archer returned from his injury at G1 Finals on August 13, when he and Smith attacked IWGP Tag Team Champions War Machine (Hanson and Raymond Rowe) and Guerrillas of Destiny (Tama Tonga and Tanga Loa). On September 24 at Destruction in Kobe, K.E.S. defeated War Machine and G.O.D. in a three-way tornado tag team match to win the IWGP Tag Team Championship for the third time. At the end of the year, K.E.S. took part in the 2017 World Tag League, where they finished with a record of five wins and two losses, failing to advance to the finals due to losing to block winners G.O.D. in their head-to-head match. On January 4, 2018, at Wrestle Kingdom 12, K.E.S. lost the IWGP Tag Team Championship to Los Ingobernables de Japón (Evil and Sanada).

In June 2018, the K.E.S. made two appearances for American promotion Ring of Honor (ROH), who has a partnership with NJPW. They lost to the Bullet Club on June 15, and the Briscoe Brothers on June 16; the latter match being for the ROH Tag Team Championship. Then K.E.S. competed in the 2018 NJPW World Tag League in December 2018, ending with 18 points, therefore failing to advance to the tournament finals.

In June 2019, Smith left NJPW, disbanding the K.E.S. and leaving Archer as a singles competitor. Shortly afterwards, Archer competed in the 2019 G1 Climax, his first participation since 2014; he participated in the A Block, with a final standing of 6 points, failing to advance to the finals. At King of Pro-Wrestling on October 14, Archer replaced Jon Moxley to defeat Juice Robinson to win the vacant IWGP United States Heavyweight Championship, his first singles championship in NJPW. He successfully defended the championship against David Finlay at Showdown in San Jose on November 9. Archer lost the title to Moxley in a Texas Deathmatch at Wrestle Kingdom 14 on January 4, 2020. On February 26, Archer signed with All Elite Wrestling (AEW) and his profile was removed from NJPW's official website, signaling his departure from NJPW. He later came back to NJPW due to his membership with Suzuki-gun. He is not recognised on the NJPW personnel but he makes appearances on NJPW Strong.

On June 12, 2022, during Dominion 6.12 in Osaka-jo Hall, Archer was announced to be participating in the G1 Climax 32 in July representing AEW, as part of the A Block. Archer finished with a total of 6 points, failing to advance to the semi-finals. Archer returned to NJPW in November, teaming with Minoru Suzuki in the World Tag League, where the team finished with 8 points, failing to advance to the finals. At the World Tag League and Best of the Super Juniors finals, Suzuki announced the disbandment of Suzuki-gun by the end of the year. The final match between the faction took place on December 23, where the team of Taichi, Zack Sabre Jr., Yoshinobu Kanemaru and Douki defeated Suzuki, Archer, El Desperado and Taka Michinoku. After the match, each of the Suzuki-gun members spoke about their memories as a part of the group and thanked leader Suzuki. The night ended with all members posing with the Suzuki-gun flag, only to be interrupted by former member Takashi Iizuka, causing all nine men to pose in the ring, behind the Suzuki-gun flag.

In April 2023, NJPW announced a tournament to crown the #1 contender for the IWGP United States Heavyweight Championship, with Archer being named as one of four participants. At NJPW Collision in Philadelphia, Archer defeated Fred Rosser to advance to the tournament final. At Dominion 6.4 in Osaka-jo Hall, Archer was defeated by Will Ospreay in the tournament final.

=== All Elite Wrestling (2020–present) ===
==== Championship pursuits (2020–2024) ====
On February 26, 2020, Archer signed a multi-year deal with All Elite Wrestling (AEW). He made his debut appearance on the March 11 episode of Dynamite as a client of Jake "The Snake" Roberts and he made his in-ring debut on the April 1 episode of Dynamite, defeating Marko Stunt. Archer was then announced as a participant in tournament for the inaugural AEW TNT Championship; he defeated Colt Cabana in the quarter finals, and Dustin Rhodes in the semi-finals, but lost in the finals to Cody at Double or Nothing on May 23 after boxer Mike Tyson prevented Roberts from interfering on Archer's behalf. On September 5 at All Out, Archer won the Casino Battle Royale match to become the number one contender for the AEW World Championship. On October 14 at the Dynamite Anniversary Show, Archer failed to win the championship in a No Disqualification match against Jon Moxley. He returned in November coming to the aid of Death Triangle against Butcher and the Blade, and Eddie Kingston, turning face in the process. On the December 2 "Winter Is Coming" special episode of Dynamite, Archer and The Lucha Bros. (Rey Fénix, and Penta El Zero Miedo) lost to Eddie Kingston, The Butcher, and The Blade. On The Dynamite Tribute Show for Brodie Lee, "Brodie Lee Celebration of Life", Archer teamed with Evil Uno and Stu Grayson against Kingston, Butcher, and The Blade. Archer dressed up as Lee's classic look, with his team winning.

On the February 24, 2021, episode of Dynamite, Archer defeated former ally Rey Fénix to qualify for The Face of The Revolution Ladder Match at Revolution. At Revolution, Archer faced Cody Rhodes, Scorpio Sky, Penta El Zero M, Max Caster, and surprise entrant Ethan Page, with Sky winning. After Revolution, Lance Archer confronted Sting and Darby Allin, who was TNT Champion at the time. In May, Archer challenged new TNT Champion Miro to a match at Double or Nothing. At Double or Nothing, Miro defeated Archer. On the July 14 episode of Dynamite, Archer challenged Jon Moxley to a rematch for the IWGP United States Heavyweight Championship in a Texas Deathmatch, which Moxley accepted. The next week at AEW Fyter Fest Night 2, Archer defeated Moxley to become a record-tying two time champion. The next week at Fight for the Fallen he retained the championship against New Japan's Hikuleo, setting a match against Hiroshi Tanahashi at NJPW Resurgence which he lost thus ending his reign at 24 days, which is the shortest reign in the title history. In early September, he realigned himself with a debuting Minoru Suzuki, and subsequently rejoin the Suzuki-gun stable, reverting to a heel in the process. At Rampage: Grand Slam, the duo were defeated by Moxley and Eddie Kingston in a Lights Out match. Archer was a participant in the Casino Ladder match, won by Adam Page. He then participated in the eliminator tournament for an AEW World Championship match where he faced Eddie Kingston in the first round. Archer was scheduled to defeat Kingston, but due to falling on his head after a botched moonsault, the match was quickly ended with Kingston rolling up Archer for the win. Later, it was discovered that Archer suffered a jammed neck as a result of the botched spot. After being sidelined for a few months with the neck injury, Archer made his AEW return on the January 12, 2022, edition of Dynamite, attacking and setting his sights on AEW World Champion Adam Page. This would lead to Archer reuniting with Roberts, briefly aligning with Dan Lambert of American Top Team, and challenging Page to a Texas Death Match on the February 9 episode Dynamite.

On the April 27 episode of Dynamite, Archer would wrestle Wardlow, losing via pinfall. After being announced for NJPW's G1 Climax 32 in July, Archer defeated Nick Comoroto at the AEW x NJPW: Forbidden Door Buy-In. In November 2022, Archer participated in the AEW World Championship eliminator tournanmet, where he was eliminated by Ricky Starks in the first round. In June 2023, Archer formed an alliance with The Righteous (Dutch and Vincent), teaming with them in various trios matches. On July 15 at Battle of the Belts, Archer unsuccessfully challenged Orange Cassidy for the AEW International Championship.

==== The Don Callis Family (2024–present) ====
Archer in August 2026

On the October 8, 2024, episode of Dynamite, Archer was acquired from Jake Roberts by Don Callis to join The Don Callis Family. On the next episode of Dynamite, Archer formed a tag team within the Don Callis Family with Brian Cage, later known as "Murder Machines". In April 2025, Cage suffered an injury, putting Murder Machines on hiatus, though Archer would continue as a singles wrestler with The Don Callis Family. In May 2026, Murder Machines reunited after Cage returned from injury.

== Other media ==
Hoyt has two video game appearances; in WWE SmackDown vs. Raw 2011 as Vance Archer and in AEW Fight Forever as Lance Archer. In 2017, he appeared in The Suplex Duplex Complex, a comedy special part of Adult Swim's Infomercials.

Hoyt, along with Brian Cage and Chavo Guerrero Jr., appeared in Steven Spielberg's science fiction film Disclosure Day.

== Personal life ==
Graduating from Hearne High, Hoyt played basketball, football, and baseball. He attended Texas State University, where he played college football as a quarterback. He has a degree in English. While in college he worked at a nightclub, where an acquaintance introduced him to Solo Faitala, who trained him to be a professional wrestler. Hoyt is a devout Christian.

== Championships and accomplishments ==
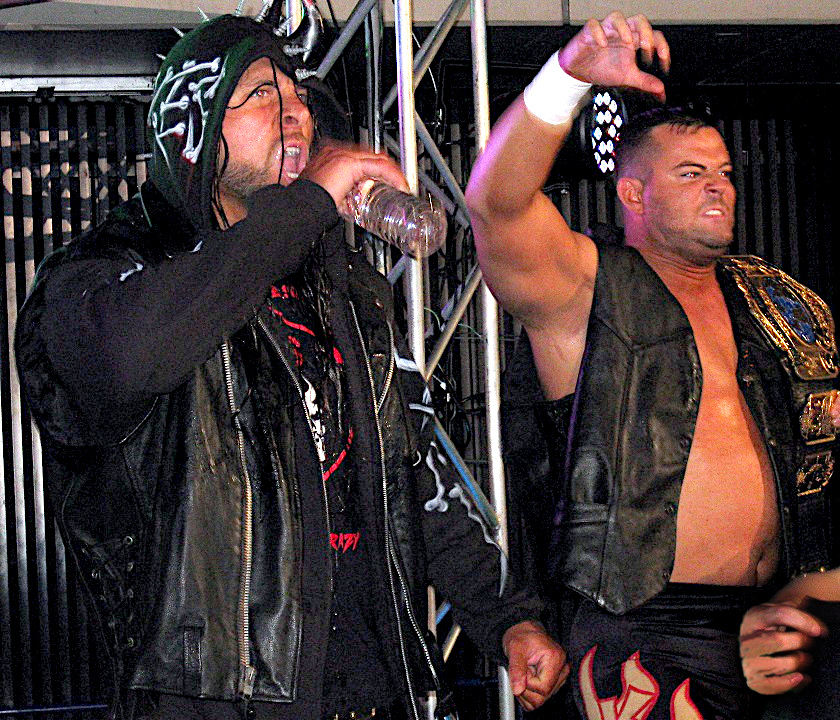
Archer (left) and Davey Boy Smith Jr. - The Killer Elite Squad - are two-time NWA World Tag Team Champions...

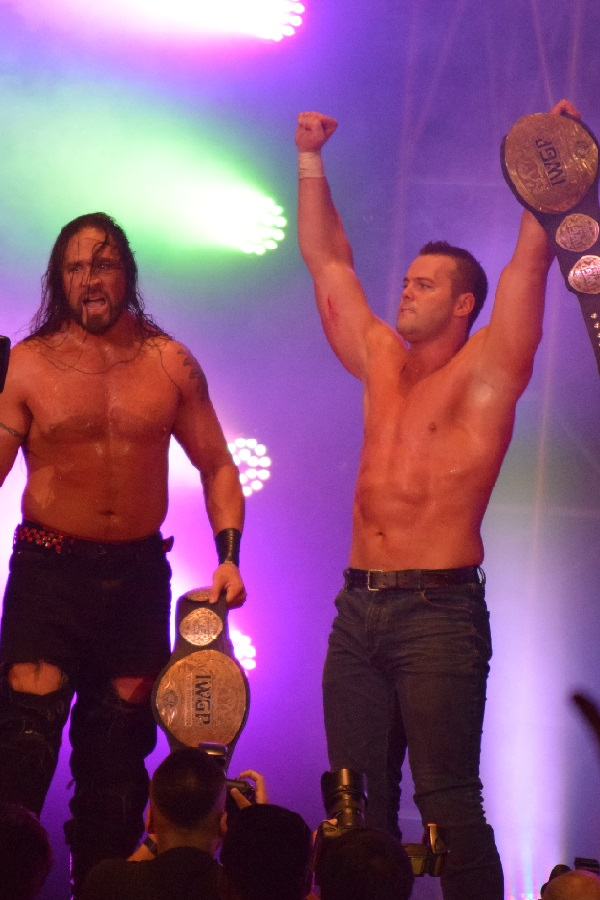
...and three-time IWGP Tag Team Champions.

- All Elite Wrestling
  - Men's Casino Battle Royale (2020)
- American Made Wrestling
  - AMW Heavyweight Championship (1 time)
- Gippsland Pro Wrestling
  - GPW Heavyweight Championship (1 time)
- Heavy On Wrestling
  - HOW Undisputed Championship (1 time)
- Lions Pride Sports
  - Lions Pride Sports Heavyweight Championship (1 time)
- National Wrestling Alliance
  - NWA World Tag Team Championship (2 times) – with Davey Boy Smith Jr.
- New Japan Pro-Wrestling
  - IWGP United States Heavyweight Championship (2 times)
  - IWGP Tag Team Championship (3 times) – with Davey Boy Smith Jr.
  - G1 Tag League (2011) – with Minoru Suzuki
- NWA Southwest
  - NWA Texas Heavyweight Championship (1 time)
- Professional Championship Wrestling
  - PCW Heavyweight Championship (3 times)
  - PCW Television Championship (1 time)
  - PCW Tag Team Championship (1 time) – with Wally Darkmon
- Pro Wrestling Illustrated
  - Faction of the Year (2025) as part of the Don Callis Family
  - Ranked No. 59 of the top 500 singles wrestlers in the PWI 500 in 2020
- Pro Wrestling Noah
  - GHC Tag Team Championship (2 times) – with Davey Boy Smith Jr.
- Pro Wrestling Religion
  - PWR Championship (1 time, inaugural, final)
- Revolution Brewing
  - Revolution Brewing Chicago Championship (1 time, current)
- River City Wrestling
  - RCW Championship (1 time)
  - RCW Tag Team Championship (1 time) - with Paul Titan
- Total Nonstop Action Wrestling
  - NWA World Tag Team Championship (2 times) – with Kid Kash
  - NWA World Tag Team Championship Tournament (2004) – with Kid Kash
- Traditional Championship Wrestling
  - TCW Heavyweight Championship (1 time)
- Warrior Wrestling
  - Warrior Wrestling Revolution Championship (1 time)
- World Wrestling Council
  - WWC Universal Heavyweight Championship (1 time)
- Wrestling Observer Newsletter
  - Most Improved (2019)
  - Worst Worked Match of the Year (2006) TNA Reverse Battle Royal on Impact!
