= Hirooki Goto =

Japanese professional wrestler (born 1979)

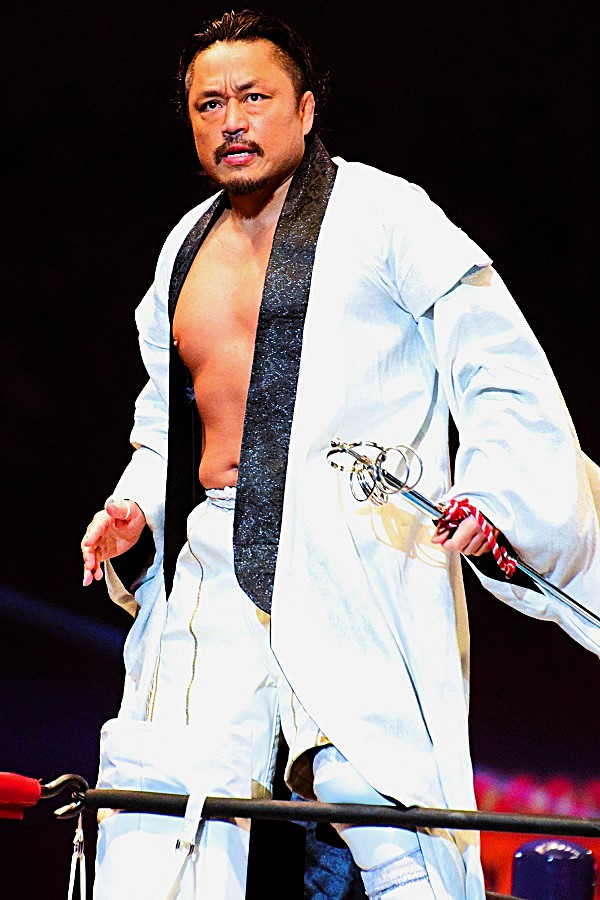
- Goto in 2024

Personal information
- Born: June 25, 1979 (age 47) Kuwana, Mie, Japan
- Children: 3

Professional wrestling career
- Ring name(s): C.T.U Ranger Red; Goto; Hirooki Goto
- Billed height: 1.82 m (6 ft 0 in)
- Billed weight: 103 kg (227 lb)
- Trained by: Hiroyoshi Tenzan
- Debut: July 6, 2003

Hirooki Goto (後藤洋央紀, Gotō Hirōki; born June 25, 1979) is a Japanese professional wrestler and actor. He is signed to New Japan Pro-Wrestling (NJPW). He is also one-half of Bishamon alongside Yoshi-Hashi.

Goto holds the record of being one-third of the longest reigning NEVER Openweight 6-Man Tag Team Champions with his Chaos stablemates, Tomohiro Ishii and Yoshi-Hashi. He is also a three-time IWGP Intercontinental Champion, a five-time IWGP Tag Team Champion, a one-time IWGP Junior Heavyweight Tag Team Champion, a one-time IWGP Heavyweight Champion, a five-time NEVER Openweight Champion, a one-time winner of the G1 Climax (2008), a five-time winner of the World Tag League (2012, 2014, 2021, 2022, and 2023), and a record three-time winner of the New Japan Cup (2009, 2010, and 2012).

== Early life ==
Goto attended Kuwana Kogyo High School in Kuwana, Mie, where he was classmates with Katsuyori Shibata. Goto later attended Kokushikan University, where he took part in freestyle wrestling and Greco-Roman wrestling.

== Professional wrestling career ==
=== New Japan Pro-Wrestling ===
==== Junior heavyweight (2003–2005) ====
Goto's first introduction to professional wrestling was the Fire Pro Wrestling videogame series. Then, he started watching JPW, NJPW, AJPW, and Michinoku Pro. Upon graduating, Goto qualified to join New Japan Pro-Wrestling (NJPW), but left the promotion after incurring a shoulder injury. He returned to NJPW in November 2002 after healing and began training in the NJPW dojo. He debuted on July 6, 2003, in Gifu, Gifu, wrestling Ryusuke Taguchi. The two men competed in the junior heavyweight division, and teamed together the same year to try to take the vacant IWGP Junior Heavyweight Tag Team Championship in a tournament, but were defeated in the final by veterans Gedo and Jado.

In early 2005, he won the NJPW Young Lion Cup, defeating Hiroyuki Itō in the tournament final. After turning heel and joining Jyushin Thunder Liger's "Control Terrorism Unit" ("C.T.U.") stable, Goto adopted the ring name "C.T.U Ranger Red". He won his first championship on May 15, 2005, teaming with Minoru to defeat Koji Kanemoto and Wataru Inoue in the Tokyo Dome for the IWGP Junior Heavyweight Tag Team Championship. The duo held the titles for nine months, losing to El Samurai and Ryusuke Taguchi on February 19, 2006, in Tokyo.

==== Foreign excursion (2006–2007) ====
In 2006, Goto joined the American Total Nonstop Action Wrestling (TNA) promotion as a member of Team Japan (consisting of CTU members Goto, Jyushin Thunder Liger, Black Tiger and Minoru), one of the four teams competing in the TNA 2006 World X Cup Tournament. He debuted in TNA on April 23, 2006, at Lockdown, where he teamed with Black Tiger and Minoru against Team USA members Sonjay Dutt, Jay Lethal and Alex Shelley. Team Japan defeated USA when Black Tiger pinned Lethal. On the April 27, 2006, episode of TNA Impact!, Goto and Minoru lost to Dutt and Shelley, giving a first round victory and two points to Team USA. On May 14, 2006, at Sacrifice, Goto and the other members of Team Japan accompanied Liger to ringside, assisting him in his victory over Team Canada captain Petey Williams. Later that night, all four members of Team Japan took part in a gauntlet match that was won by Team Canada captain Petey Williams. The 2006 World X Cup was won by Team USA (with five points), with Team Japan coming last with three points.

On August 1, 2006, Goto left for a lengthy learning excursion to Mexico after losing in a farewell match at the CTU 2nd Anniversary Show. While in Mexico he wrestled primarily for Consejo Mundial de Lucha Libre and for Último Dragón's Toryumon Mexico. During his time in Mexico, he formed a rudo unit with Hajime Ohara and Shigeo Okumura in CMLL.

==== RISE (2007–2009) ====
In August 2007, Goto returned to New Japan after his almost one-year stay in Mexico. Upon his return, the now much more muscular Goto graduated from a Jr. heavyweight to a Heavyweight. Goto showed a great deal of promise and skill since last seen in July 2006. He showcased a whole new moveset and he quickly tried to establish himself as one of the top Heavyweights in New Japan. Not that far into his return Goto joined the Stable "R.I.S.E" with Shinsuke Nakamura, Travis Tomko, Giant Bernard, and fellow former CTU teammates Minoru, Milano Collection AT, and Prince Devitt. On November 11, he challenged Hiroshi Tanahashi for the IWGP Heavyweight Championship, but Tanahashi won with the Texas Cloverleaf. Shortly after that Goto entered the 2007 G1 Tag League with Milano Collection AT, but the pair would finish in third place.

In 2008 Goto wrestled one of his childhood idols, The Great Muta at New Japan's annual January 4 Tokyo Dome Show. Although having a good showing, Goto would fall to Muta.

Goto's progress was good through 2008 but a surprise victory in New Japan's prestigious G1 Climax in August surpassed everyone's expectations. Goto earned 8 points in Block B, tied for first with Nakamura, but he advanced to the final due to a direct win over the former IWGP champion and RISE leader. Meeting Togi Makabe in the final, Goto overcame outside interference and blood loss to defeat the leader of the Great Bash Heel (G.B.H.) faction, pinning him with the Shouten.

In March 2009 Goto defeated Karl Anderson, Shinsuke Nakamura, Yuji Nagata and Giant Bernard to win the 2009 New Japan Cup and earn a shot at Hiroshi Tanahashi's IWGP Heavyweight Championship. On May 3, 2009, at Wrestling Dontaku 2009, Tanahashi defeated Goto to retain the IWGP Heavyweight Championship.

==== Tournament wins (2010–2013) ====
On January 4, 2010, at Wrestle Kingdom IV in Tokyo Dome, Takashi Sugiura successfully defended his GHC Heavyweight Championship against Goto. In March, Goto defeated Yujiro Takahashi, Masato Tanaka and Togi Makabe to win the 2010 New Japan Cup for the second year in a row. Goto went on to challenge the IWGP Heavyweight Champion Shinsuke Nakamura on April 4, but would once again fail in his attempt to win the title. On June 28, 2010, Goto, teaming up with Prince Devitt and Ryusuke Taguchi entered the J Sports Crown Openweight 6 Man Tag Tournament. Two days later the trio defeated Hiroshi Tanahashi, Tajiri and Kushida in the finals to win the tournament. During August's G1 Climax Goto debuted a new finishing maneuver, a cross-legged cradle, which he initially titled as Goto Special but was later renamed Goto-Shiki Hold (Goto Style Hold), has earned him pinfall victories over former IWGP Heavyweight Champions Yuji Nagata and Shinsuke Nakamura, but a loss to eventual G1 winner Satoshi Kojima on the final day of the tournament dropped him fourth in his block, narrowly missing the finals. On October 11 Goto defeated Shinsuke Nakamura to earn the right to challenge for the IWGP Heavyweight Championship. However, the reigning IWGP Heavyweight Champion Satoshi Kojima vetoed the result of the match and named Nakamura his first challenger for the belt. On December 11, while Kojima successfully defended his title against Nakamura, Goto was derailed from his quest to win the IWGP Heavyweight Championship with a loss against Hiroshi Tanahashi. The following day Kojima defeated Goto in a non–title match, ending Goto's dream of main eventing Wrestle Kingdom V in Tokyo Dome. Instead, Goto teamed with the returning Kazuchika Okada in a tag team match, where they were defeated by Pro Wrestling Noah representatives Yoshihiro Takayama and Takashi Sugiura. On March 6 Goto began his quest to win his third New Japan Cup in a row, but was defeated in the first round by Shinsuke Nakamura. On March 20, the final day of the tournament, Goto turned heel by abandoning IWGP Heavyweight Champion Hiroshi Tanahashi during a tag team match against Satoshi Kojima and MVP. This marked Goto's final appearance for New Japan, before leaving for his second excursion to Mexico.

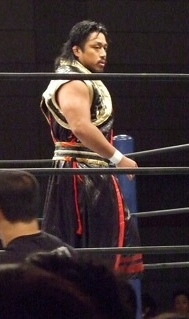
Goto in June 2011

Goto made his return to CMLL on March 25 and would, for the next month, work for the promotion as a heel, culminating in a match on April 29 at Arena México's 55th anniversary show, where he unsuccessfully challenged Último Guerrero for the CMLL World Heavyweight Championship in a Two Out of Three Falls match. Goto returned to New Japan on May 3, when he teamed with Tama Tonga to defeat Takashi Sugiura and Makoto Hashi in a tag team match. Later in the event, Goto attacked and declared a war on Hiroshi Tanahashi after he had successfully defended the IWGP Heavyweight Championship against Shinsuke Nakamura. Goto would once again fail in his IWGP Heavyweight Championship challenge on June 18, 2011. After the match, Goto and Tanahashi seemingly made peace with each other, with Tanahashi suggesting that they go for the IWGP Tag Team Championship together. On June 23, Goto, Prince Devitt and Ryusuke Taguchi won their second J Sports Crown Openweight 6 Man Tag Tournament in a row by defeating the team of Giant Bernard, Jyushin Thunder Liger and Karl Anderson in the finals of the three-day-long tournament. On July 3 Goto and Tanahashi failed in their attempt to capture the IWGP Tag Team Championship from Giant Bernard and Karl Anderson. On August 1, Goto entered the 2011 G1 Climax, where he went on to win six out of his nine matches, but a loss to Strong Man on the final day of the tournament dropped him to second place in his block, causing him to narrowly miss the finals of the tournament. In the 2011 G1 Tag League, Goto teamed with Hiroshi Tanahashi as "The Billion Powers". After picking up two wins and two losses in their first four matches in the group stage of the tournament, Goto and Tanahashi defeated the Beast Combination (Satoshi Kojima and Togi Makabe) on November 4 to advance to the semifinals of the tournament. On November 6, Goto and Tanahashi were eliminated from the tournament in the semifinals by Bad Intentions. On November 12 at Power Struggle, Goto unsuccessfully challenged Masato Tanaka for the IWGP Intercontinental Championship. On January 4, 2012, at Wrestle Kingdom VI in Tokyo Dome, Goto reignited his rivalry with Pro Wrestling Noah's Takashi Sugiura, defeating him in a singles match.

On February 12 at The New Beginning, Goto defeated Masato Tanaka to win the IWGP Intercontinental Championship for the first time. Goto made his first title defense on March 11, defeating Yujiro Takahashi. On April 1, Goto entered the 2012 New Japan Cup. After victories over Yujiro Takahashi, La Sombra and Togi Makabe, Goto defeated Hiroshi Tanahashi on April 8 in the finals to win the tournament for the third time and earn another shot at the IWGP Heavyweight Championship. On May 3 at Wrestling Dontaku 2012, Goto unsuccessfully challenged Kazuchika Okada for the IWGP Heavyweight Championship. On May 20, Goto made his second successful defense of the IWGP Intercontinental Championship against Tomohiro Ishii. On July 22, Goto lost the title to Shinsuke Nakamura in his third defense. On October 8 at King of Pro-Wrestling, Goto received a rematch for the title, but was again defeated by Nakamura. On November 11 at Power Struggle, Goto unsuccessfully challenged Kazuchika Okada for the right to challenge for the IWGP Heavyweight Championship at the Tokyo Dome. From November 20 to December 1, Goto took part in the round-robin portion of the 2012 World Tag League, alongside Karl Anderson under the team name "Sword & Guns". The team finished with a record of four wins and two losses, finishing second in their block and advancing to the semifinals of the tournament. On December 2, Goto and Anderson defeated Tencozy (Hiroyoshi Tenzan and Satoshi Kojima) to advance to the finals of the tournament, where, later that same day, they defeated the reigning IWGP Tag Team Champions, K.E.S. (Davey Boy Smith Jr. and Lance Archer), to win the tournament. Sword & Guns received their shot at the IWGP Tag Team Championship on January 4, 2013, at Wrestle Kingdom 7 in Tokyo Dome, but were defeated in a rematch by K.E.S.

==== Storyline with Katsuyori Shibata (2013–2015) ====
In February 2013, Goto made a challenge towards former high school classmate Katsuyori Shibata, which led to a tag team match on February 10, where he and Wataru Inoue were defeated by Shibata and Kazushi Sakuraba. Afterwards, Goto and Shibata had a heated confrontation, building to a future singles match between the two. In March, Goto once again made it to the finals of the New Japan Cup, before losing to Kazuchika Okada. Goto and Shibata finally faced off in a singles match on May 3 at Wrestling Dontaku 2013, which ended in a draw. A rematch between the two took place on June 22 at Dominion 6.22, where Shibata was victorious. A third match between the two on July 20 ended in another draw. During early August, Goto participated in the 2013 G1 Climax. On August 8, however, it was revealed that Goto had suffered a fractured jaw and was pulled from the tournament. He was leading the A block with four wins (which included a big win over IWGP Heavyweight Champion Kazuchika Okada) and two losses and had three matches left when he was pulled from the G1.

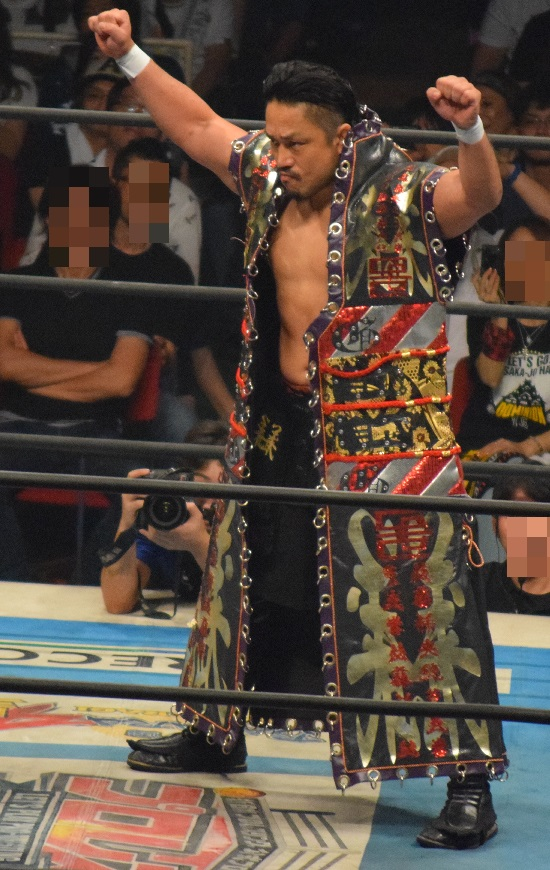
Goto in July 2015

Goto returned on December 8, challenging Katsuyori Shibata to a match at Wrestle Kingdom 8 in Tokyo Dome. On January 4, 2014, Goto defeated Shibata in his return match. The match ended the rivalry between Goto and Shibata and led to the two forming a tag team. The following day, Goto scored the pinfall in an eight-man tag team main event against Chaos, after which he challenged Kazuchika Okada to a match for the IWGP Heavyweight Championship. On February 11 at The New Beginning in Osaka, Goto received his seventh shot at the IWGP Heavyweight Championship, but was yet again unsuccessful in capturing the title. Afterwards, Goto and Shibata entered the IWGP Tag Team Championship picture, defeating the reigning champions, Bullet Club (Doc Gallows and Karl Anderson), in a non-title match at New Japan's 42nd anniversary event on March 6. They received their title shot on April 6 at Invasion Attack 2014, but were defeated by Gallows and Anderson. From July 21 to August 8, Goto took part in the 2014 G1 Climax, where he finished with a record of four wins and six losses. During the tournament final event on August 10, Goto and Shibata faced off in another singles match, where Shibata was victorious. Goto then entered a storyline, where he started leading a counterattack against the Bullet Club and Chaos stables, with the goal of revitalizing the New Japan Seikigun ("regular army"), which he represented alongside the likes of Shibata and Hiroshi Tanahashi. On November 8 at Power Struggle, Goto received his first shot at the NEVER Openweight Championship, but was defeated by the defending champion, Tomohiro Ishii. Later in the month, Goto and Shibata entered the 2014 World Tag League, where they opened with a three match losing streak, only to come back and win their four remaining matches, winning their block and advancing to the finals. On December 7, Goto and Shibata defeated Doc Gallows and Karl Anderson in the finals to win the 2014 World Tag League. This led to a rematch between the two teams on January 4, 2015, at Wrestle Kingdom 9 in Tokyo Dome, where Goto and Shibata defeated Anderson and Gallows to become the new IWGP Tag Team Champions. Goto and Shibata's reign ended in their first defense on February 11 at The New Beginning in Osaka, where they were defeated by Anderson and Gallows.

On March 8, Goto and Shibata once again faced off in the second round of the 2015 New Japan Cup in a match, where Goto was victorious. Goto eventually made it to the finals of the tournament on March 15, where he was defeated by Kota Ibushi. On May 3 at Wrestling Dontaku 2015, Goto defeated Shinsuke Nakamura to win the IWGP Intercontinental Championship for the second time. Goto made his first title defense on July 5 at Dominion 7.5 in Osaka-jo Hall, defeating Nakamura in a rematch. From July 23 to August 15, Goto took part in the 2015 G1 Climax. After six victories, one of which came over reigning IWGP Heavyweight Champion Kazuchika Okada, Goto entered the final day with a chance to advance from his block, but was eliminated after suffering his third loss of the tournament against Yuji Nagata. Through NJPW's working relationship with the Ring of Honor (ROH) promotion, Goto returned to the United States on August 21, teaming with Jay Briscoe and Mark Briscoe in a six-man tag team match, where they defeated Okada, Beretta and Rocky Romero. Goto's Intercontinental Championship reign ended on September 27 at Destruction in Kobe, when he was defeated by Shinsuke Nakamura in another title rematch.

==== Chaos (2016–2020) ====
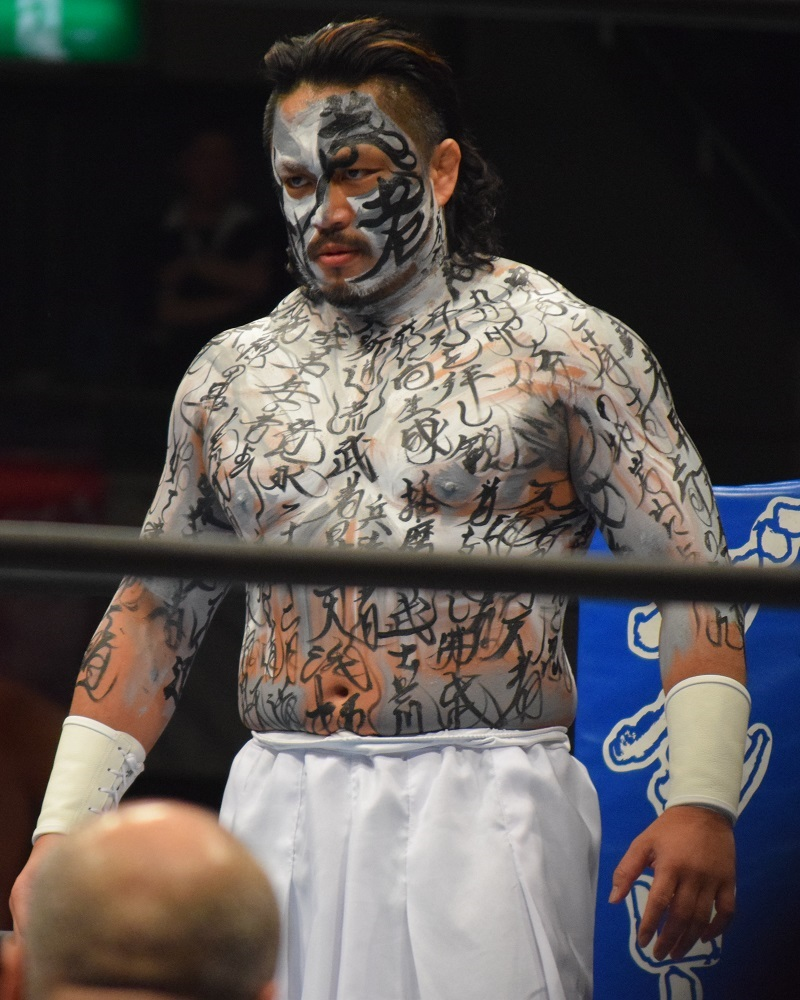
Goto in February 2016

After defeating Tetsuya Naito on January 4, 2016, at Wrestle Kingdom 10 in Tokyo Dome, Goto received his eighth shot at the IWGP Heavyweight Championship, but yet again failed to win the title, being defeated by the defending champion, Kazuchika Okada, on February 11 at The New Beginning in Osaka. Goto went into the match with new attire, painting his body white and covering himself with script. Following the match, Okada offered Goto a spot in the Chaos stable. Over the next several events, Okada tried to shake hands with Goto and get him to join Chaos on multiple occasions, but was turned down each time. In March, Goto made it to the finals of the 2016 New Japan Cup, but was defeated there by Tetsuya Naito. After the final match, Goto finally agreed to shake hands with Okada, after he saved him from a post-match assault by Naito and his Los Ingobernables de Japón stable, and joined Chaos. From July 18 to August 12, Goto took part in the round-robin portion of the 2016 G1 Climax, where he won his block, besting both Hiroshi Tanahashi and reigning IWGP Heavyweight Champion Kazuchika Okada, with a record of six wins and three losses, advancing to the finals. On August 14, Goto was defeated in the finals by Kenny Omega. At the end of the year, Goto took part in the 2016 World Tag League, teaming with Chaos stablemate Tomohiro Ishii. The two finished the tournament with a record of four wins and three losses, failing to advance to the finals due to losing to block winners Togi Makabe and Tomoaki Honma in their final round-robin match.

On January 4, 2017, at Wrestle Kingdom 11 in Tokyo Dome, Goto defeated Katsuyori Shibata to win the NEVER Openweight Championship for the first time. Goto made his first successful title defense on February 5 at The New Beginning in Sapporo against Juice Robinson. His second defense took place at the NJPW and ROH co-produced Honor Rising: Japan 2017 event, where he defeated ROH wrestler Punisher Martinez. On April 9 at Sakura Genesis 2017, Goto made his third successful defense against Zack Sabre Jr., despite outside interference from Sabre's Suzuki-gun stablemates Minoru Suzuki and El Desperado. Afterwards, Goto brawled with Suzuki, setting up his next title defense. On April 27, Goto lost the NEVER Openweight Championship to Suzuki. On June 11 at Dominion 6.11 in Osaka-jo Hall, he failed to reclaim the title in a rematch against Suzuki in a Lumberjack Deathmatch. The following month, Goto entered the 2017 G1 Climax, where he finished with a record of five wins and four losses, failing to advance from his block. At the end of the year, Goto teamed with Yoshi-Hashi in the 2017 World Tag League. Finishing with a record of four wins and three losses, the team failed to qualify for the finals, after losing to Evil and Sanada in their final round-robin match. On January 4, 2018, Goto defeated Minoru Suzuki in a Hair vs. Hair match to win the NEVER Openweight Championship, forcing Suzuki to have his head shaved bald. On January 5, 2018, at New Year's Dash, he was challenged to a title match by Evil, which he accepted. The match took place on February 10, 2018, at The New Beginning in Osaka, where Goto was victorious. On February 23, 2018, Goto made his second successful defense of the NEVER Openweight Championship against The Beer City Bruiser at the NJPW and ROH co-produced Honor Rising: Japan 2018 event. On April 27, 2018, at Road to Wrestling Dontaku, Goto made his third successful defense of the NEVER Openweight championship in a rematch with Juice Robinson. On June 9, 2018, at Dominion 6.9 in Osaka-jo Hall, Goto lost the NEVER Openweight Championship to Michael Elgin in a 3-way match which also involved Taichi, ending his second reign at 156 days. On June 17, 2018, at Kizuna Road, Goto defeated Elgin in a rematch for the NEVER Openweight Championship to win back the title Goto made his first successful title defense against Jeff Cobb at G1 Special in San Francisco. From July 14 to August 12 Goto took part in the G1 Climax 2018 and he ended up with 3 wins and 6 losses, failing to advance to the finals. On the final day of the G1 Climax, a returning Taichi later challenged him for the NEVER Openweight Championship, which Goto accepted. On September 17, at Destruction in Beppu, Goto lost the NEVER Openweight Championship to Taichi in his second defense. On October 27, Goto requested for a rematch for the NEVER Openweight Championship, replacing his Chaos stablemate Will Ospreay, who was scheduled to challenge Taichi at Power Struggle for the title but was unable to do so due to Ospreay suffering an injury. Taichi, however, waved off Goto's challenge and declined immediately. Despite this, the title match was eventually still set at Power struggle which took place on November 3. At the event, Goto defeated Taichi to win the NEVER Openweight Championship for the fourth time. Goto would lose the belt to Kota Ibushi on December 9, without having any defenses.

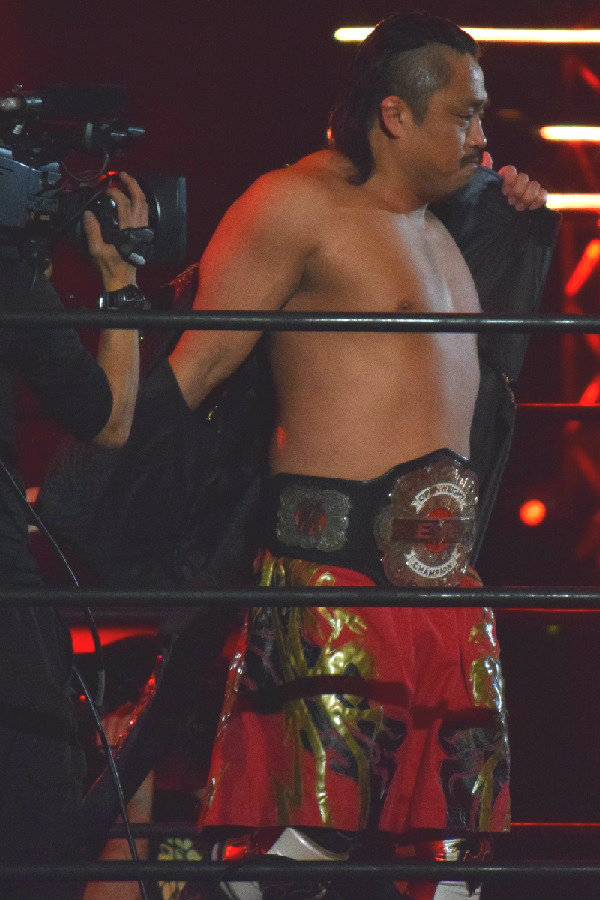
Goto in February 2017, during his first reign as the NEVER Openweight Champion

2019 would see Goto change effectively. After some massive losses, including one to Jay White on April 29, Goto would travel to the United States to train under Shibata's LA Dojo system to improve as he also briefly wrestled for Ring of Honor during their War Of The Worlds series. From July 6 until August 11, 2019, Goto returned and took part in the 2019 G1 Climax, where he finished the tournament with a record of five wins (one against Jay White) and four losses, failing to advance to the finals of the tournament, due to losing to Shingo Takagi in their head-to-head match. Goto would avenge his loss to Shingo at September's Destruction in Kobe however. In the same event, he would challenge White for his newly won Intercontinental Championship, although White repeatedly refused, the match was set up anyway for Power Struggle, where Goto would lose. From November 16 until December 8, Goto and Karl Fredericks took part in the 2019 World Tag League, failing to win the tournament with a record of three wins and twelve losses. Afterward, Goto began feuding with KENTA. Throughout the 2019 World Tag League, KENTA began mocking Goto after his matches, leading Goto to attack him on November 29. Despite being attacked by Goto, KENTA continued to mock Goto leading him to attack KENTA again on December 8. At a press conference the following day, Goto drew the ire of KENTA, after calling into question his in-ring abilities, leading KENTA to return the favor and attack him.

==== Bishamon (2020–present) ====
On January 5, 2020, on the second night of Wrestle Kingdom 14 in Tokyo Dome, Goto defeated KENTA to win the NEVER Openweight Championship for the fifth time. He lost the title to Shingo Takagi on February 1, at The New Beginning in Sapporo. In June, Goto took part in the 2020 New Japan Cup, being eliminated from the tournament by EVIL in the second round. On August 9, Goto, Ishii & Yoshi-Hashi defeated fellow CHAOS stablemates Kazuchika Okada, Toru Yano & Sho in a tournament final to win NEVER Openweight 6-Man Tag Team Championship. From September 19 until October 17, Goto took part in the 2020 G1 Climax, finishing the tournament with a record of four wins and five losses, failing to advance to the finals of the tournament. During the tournament, Goto and Toru Yano broke the record of the shortest match in the tournament's history with the match lasting 18 seconds, surpassing the record held by Kenzo Suzuki against Tadao Yasuda in the 2002 tournament, which their match lasted 37 seconds. From November 15 until December 6, Goto and Yoshi-Hashi took part in the 2020 World Tag League, finishing the tournament with a record of five wins and four losses, failing to advance to the finals of the tournament. In March 2021, Goto took part in the 2021 New Japan Cup, losing in the second round to eventual finalist Shingo Takagi on March 13. From September 19 to October 20, Goto took part in the 2021 G1 Climax, where he finished with a record of three wins and six losses, failing to advance to the finals of the tournament. Goto, Ishii & Yoshi-Hashi's reign would break the record for the longest reign as champions at 454 days and the most successful title defenses with 9 defenses, before losing the titles to House of Torture (EVIL, Sho & Yujiro Takahashi) on November 6 at Power Struggle. From November 14 to December 12, Goto took part in the round-robin portion of the 2021 World Tag League, alongside Yoshi-Hashi. The team finished with a record of nine wins and two losses, advancing to the finals of the tournament. On December 15, Goto & Yoshi-Hashi defeated EVIL & Yujiro Takahashi in the finals to win the 2021 World Tag League. On January 4, 2022, on the first night of Wrestle Kingdom 16, Goto and Yoshi-Hashi defeated Taichi & Zack Sabre Jr. to win the IWGP Tag Team Championship. On Night 2, Goto, Yoshi-Hashi and Yoh, failed to capture the NEVER Openweight 6-man Tag Team championships from House of Torture.

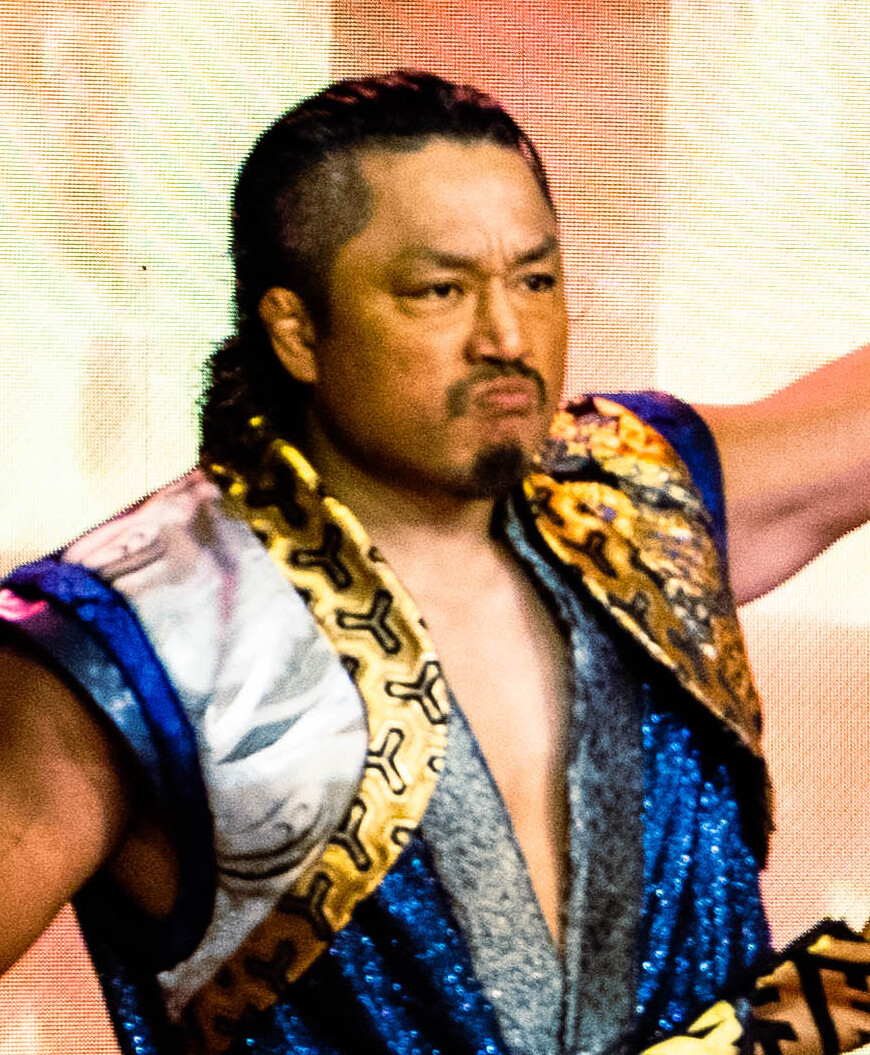
Goto at AEW x NJPW: Forbidden Door in June 2022

In March 2022, Goto competed in the New Japan Cup, defeating Yuji Nagata and Dick Togo, before being defeated by Cima in the third round. At Hyper Battle, Goto and Yoshi-Hashi, now going by the tag- team name Bishamon, lost the IWGP Tag Team Championships to United Empire's Jeff Cobb and Great-O-Khan. At Dominion 6.12 in Osaka-jo Hall, Goto competed in an AEW Interim World Championship eliminator match for a chance to face Jon Moxley for the title at Forbidden Door, a co-produced show between NJPW and American wrestling company All Elite Wrestling. At the event, Goto was defeated by Hiroshi Tanahashi. Instead at the show, Goto and Yoshi-Hashi competed in the opening match on the Buy-In, defeating Q. T. Marshall and Aaron Solo. This win lead to the pair getting an AEW World Tag Team Championship eliminator match on AEW Rampage, making their AEW debuts against current champions The Young Bucks, which they lost. In June, Goto was announced to be competing in the G1 Climax 32 tournament in July, as a part of the C Block. Prior to the beginning of the tournament, Goto teamed with Yoshi-Hashi and Yoh to win the Never Openweight 6-man tag-team championships in a Wrestle Kingdom rematch. Goto finished his G1 campaign with a total of 6 points, failing to advance to the semi-finals.

In September 2022 at Burning Spirit, Goto, Yoshi-Hashi and Yoh, lost the 6-man tag-team championships back to House of Torture. The month after this, Goto competed in a tournament to crown the inaugural NJPW World Television Champion, but was defeated by Kenta in the first round. In November, Bishamon competed in the World Tag League, finishing joint-top of the block and thus advancing to the finals. In the finals, Bishamon defeated Aussie Open (Kyle Fletcher and Mark Davis) to win the tournament for a second year in a row. On January 4 2023, at Wrestle Kingdom 17, the duo defeated FTR to win the IWGP Tag Team Championship for the second time as a tag-team.

Bishamon made their first title defense at The New Beginning in Sapporo in February, defeating TMDK (Mikey Nicholls and Shane Haste). A month later, the duo successfully defended the titles against Kazuchika Okada and Hiroshi Tanahashi. Later in the month, Goto competed in the 2023 New Japan Cup, receiving a bye to the second round, where he defeated Kyle Fletcher. In the following round, Goto was defeated by Tama Tonga. In April at Sakura Genesis, Bishamon lost the IWGP Tag Team titles to Aussie Open, ending their third reign at 94 days. Later in the month, Goto made his debut on Tamashii, NJPW's Australasian subsidiary. In June at Dominion 6.4 in Osaka-jo Hall, Bishamon won their third IWGP Heavyweight Tag Team Championship and Goto's overall fourth, defeating House of Torture and United Empire to win both the vacant IWGP Tag Team titles and the Strong Openweight Tag Team Championships, thus becoming double champions. Five Days later, Bishamon reunited with Tomohiro Ishii at All Together Again, a joint event between NJPW, Pro Wrestling Noah (NOAH) and All Japan Pro Wrestling (AJPW), to defeat NOAH's Masa Kitamiya, Daiki Inaba and Yoshiki Inamura. On July 4 on night 1 of NJPW Independence Day, Bishamon lost the Strong Openweight Championships, to Bullet Club Wardogs (Alex Coughlin and Gabriel Kidd). The following night in a rematch, the duo defeated Coughlin and Kidd to retain the IWGP Tag Team Championships. The following week, Goto entered the G1 Cimax tournament, where he'd compete in the D Block. Goto finished with 6 points, failing to advance to the tournament's quarterfinals.

Bishamon returned to tag-team competition in November, competing in the annual World Tag League, participating in the B-Block. The duo finished with 9 points, making them runner's up in the block, thus advancing them to the semi-finals. In the semi-final round, Bishamon defeated Bullet Club Wardogs (Alex Coughlin and Gabe Kidd). In the tournament finals, Bishamon defeated, Strong Openweight Tag Team Champions, Guerrillas of Destiny (Hikuleo and El Phantasmo), to win their third consecutive NJPW World Tag League, whilst also making them the record winners. Due to them already being IWGP Tag Team Champions, the duo decided to use their World Tag League win to have a title vs title rematch against Guerrillas of Destiny (G.O.D), at Wrestle Kingdom 18. On January 4, 2024, at Wrestle Kingdom. Bishamon was defeated by G.O.D, ending the team's third IWGP Tag Team title reign at 214 days.

In March 2024, Goto entered the annual New Japan Cup, receiving a bye to the second round. Goto defeated Chase Owens to advance to the quarterfinals. In the next round, Goto was scheduled to face David Finlay, but advanced to the semi-finals, when Finlay pulled out of the tournament due to an illness. Goto defeated the previous year's cup winner Sanada in the semi-finals, thus advancing to his first New Japan Cup final in 8 years. In the Cup final, Goto was defeated by Yota Tsuji.

After winning the annual New Japan Ranbo at Wrestle Kingdom 19, Goto challenged Zack Sabre Jr. for the IWGP World Heavyweight Championship at The New Beginning in Osaka. At the event, Goto defeated Sabre, to win his first world championship. He dedicated his win to his deceased father and celebrated with his son and daughter. On March 6 at the NJPW 53rd Anniversary Show, Goto made his first successful title defense against Hiroshi Tanahashi. During the 2025 New Japan Cup in March 15, Goto successfully defended his title against Yuji Nagata. On April 5 at Sakura Genesis, Goto successfully defended his title against New Japan Cup winner David Finlay. A week later at Windy City Riot, Goto successfully defended his title against Shota Umino. On May 4 at Wrestling Dontaku, Goto successfully defended his title against Callum Newman. At Dominion 6.15 on June 15, Goto defeated Shingo Takagi in a successful defense; with the win, he broke the reign record and combined record for most successful title defenses with seven. Goto's reign as the IWGP World Heavyweight Champion ended when he lost to Sabre Jr. at Tanahashi Jam on June 29. It was later revealed that Goto suffered an elbow injury and was forced to pull out of the G1 Climax tournament. On October 13 at King of Pro-Wrestling, Goto returned to confront and challenged the newly crowned IWGP World Heavyweight Champion Konosuke Takeshita. On November 2 at Final Homecoming, Goto failed to regain the title from Takeshita.

On January 19, 2026 during the Road to The New Beginning tour, Bishamon and Boltin Oleg as Bishamon-tin defeated TMDK to win the NEVER Openweight 6-Man Tag Team Championship, this marked Bishamon's third reign with the title. On Night 2 of Wrestling Dontaku on May 4, 2026, Bishamon-tin lost their titles to the United Empire (Great-O-Khan, Henare, and Will Ospreay).

== Other media ==
Goto made his acting debut in 2016 with a cameo appearance as a gangster in the Indonesian action film Headshot. In 2020, Goto appeared in Kamen Rider Zero-One the Movie: Real×Time as Buga, a computer avatar and one of the users of the Kamen Rider Abaddon powers. He portrays

== Championships and accomplishments ==
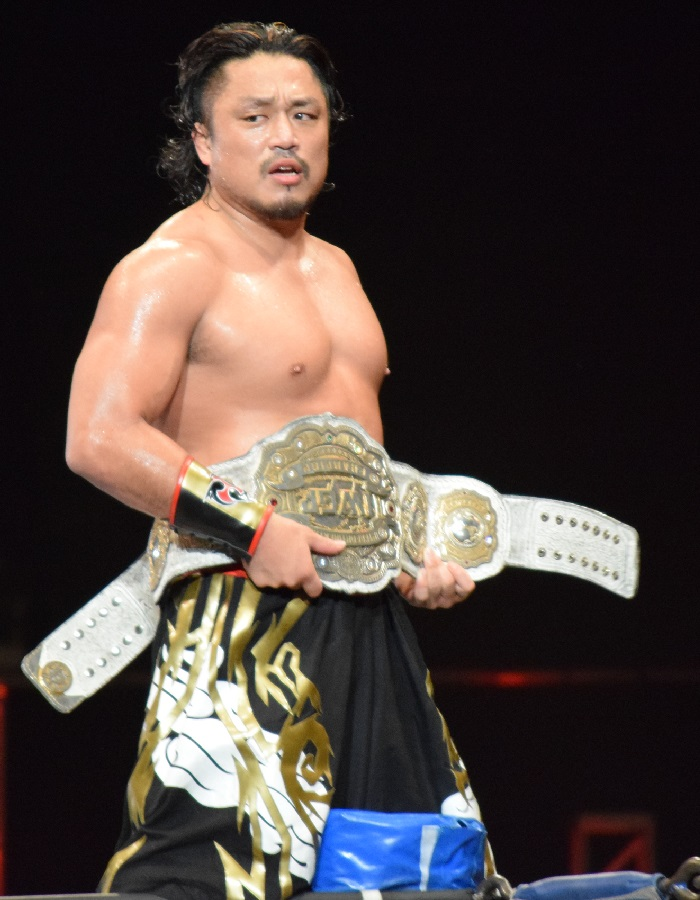
Goto in August 2ed, during his second reign as the IWGP Intercontinental Champion

- New Japan Pro-Wrestling
  - IWGP Heavyweight Championship (1 time) (Note: During Goto's reign, the title was called the IWGP World Heavyweight Championship.)
  - IWGP Intercontinental Championship (3 times) (Note: With the reactivation of the IWGP Heavyweight Championship and the restored and combined histories of both it, the World Heavyweight, and the Intercontinental titles, all former IWGP World Heavyweight Champions are retroactively recognized as having been an IWGP Intercontinental Champion.)
  - IWGP Tag Team Championship (5 times) – with Katsuyori Shibata (1) and Yoshi-Hashi (4)
  - IWGP Junior Heavyweight Tag Team Championship (1 time) – with Minoru
  - NEVER Openweight Championship (5 times)
  - NEVER Openweight 6-Man Tag Team Championship (3 times) – with Yoshi-Hashi and Tomohiro Ishii (1), Yoshi-Hashi and Yoh (1), and Yoshi-Hashi and Boltin Oleg (1)
  - Strong Openweight Tag Team Championship (1 time) – with Yoshi-Hashi
  - G1 Climax (2008)
  - New Japan Cup (2009, 2010, 2012)
  - World Tag League (2012) – with Karl Anderson
  - World Tag League (2014) – with Katsuyori Shibata
  - World Tag League (2021, 2022, 2023) – with Yoshi-Hashi
  - Eighth NJPW Triple Crown Champion
  - Young Lion Cup (2005)
  - J Sports Crown Openweight 6 Man Tag Tournament (2010, 2011) – with Prince Devitt and Ryusuke Taguchi
  - NEVER Openweight Six Man Tag Team Title Tournament (2020) – with Yoshi-Hashi and Tomohiro Ishii
  - Samurai! TV Openweight Tag Tournament (2005) – with Yuji Nagata
  - IWGP Junior Heavyweight Tag Team Title #1 Contendership Tournament (2003) - with Ryusuke Taguchi
  - Jr. Heavyweight Tag MVP Award (2005) – with Minoru
- Pro Wrestling Illustrated
  - Ranked No. 5 of the top 500 singles wrestlers in the PWI 500 in 2025
- Tokyo Sports
  - Best Tag Team Award (2023) – with Yoshi-Hashi
  - Best Bout Award (2024) Goto vs. Yota Tsuji on March 20
- Toryumon Mexico
  - NWA International Junior Heavyweight Championship (1 time)
  - Yamaha Cup (2007)

=== Luchas de Apuestas record ===
Winner (wager)	Loser (wager)	Location	Event	Date	Notes
Hirooki Goto (hair)	Minoru Suzuki (hair and championship)	Tokyo, Japan	Wrestle Kingdom 12	January 4, 2018	
