= Strong Style Evolved (2018) =

2018 New Japan Pro-Wrestling event

- Promotion: New Japan Pro-Wrestling
- Date: March 25, 2018
- City: Long Beach, California, U.S.
- Venue: Walter Pyramid
- Attendance: 4,372

Event chronology
← Previous; New Japan Cup; Honor Rising: Japan 2018	Next → Sakura Genesis

Strong Style Evolved chronology
← Previous; First	Next → Strong Style Evolved UK

Strong Style Evolved was a professional wrestling event promoted by New Japan Pro-Wrestling (NJPW). The show took place on March 25, 2018, in Long Beach, California, United States at the Walter Pyramid.

The event was broadcast on AXS TV in the United States and on NJPW World internationally.

== Production ==
Other on-screen personnel
Role:	Name:
Commentators	Chris Charlton (English-language announcer)
Commentators	Don Callis (English-language announcer)
Commentators	Kevin Kelly (English-language announcer)
Ring announcers	Makoto Abe
Referees	Kenta Sato
Referees	Marty Asami
Referees	Red Shoes Unno
Referees	Tiger Hattori

=== Background ===
On November 5, 2017, NJPW announced the follow-up event to G1 Special in USA, the event, titled Strong Style Evolved, would take place on March 25, 2018, at the Walter Pyramid in Long Beach, California. Tickets for the event sold out within 20 minutes of being made available for purchase.

To coincide with the event, NJPW held "Strong Style Saturday" on March 24 at the newly opened NJPW LA Dojo. The event included a fan festival featuring autograph sessions, a contract signing for the IWGP United States Heavyweight Championship title defense, and in-ring matches.

=== Storylines ===
On January 28, 2018, at The New Beginning in Sapporo, "Switchblade" Jay White defeated Kenny Omega to become IWGP United States Heavyweight Champion. Following the match, White was challenged by Omega's Bullet Club stablemate Hangman Page. A championship match between the two was announced for Strong Style Evolved on February 26.

On February 10, 2018, at The New Beginning in Osaka, former WWE wrestler Rey Mysterio Jr. made his NJPW debut in a pre-taped video, challenging Jyushin Thunder Liger to a match at Strong Style Evolved. Liger, who was on commentary, accepted the challenge and the match was later announced for the event. On March 3, Mysterio suffered a bicep injury at a Northeast Wrestling event, leading to Mysterio being replaced by Will Ospreay at Strong Style Evolved.

In July 2008, Canadian wrestler Kenny Omega started his first Japanese tour with the DDT Pro-Wrestling (DDT) promotion, where he quickly became friends with Kota Ibushi, with the two forming a tag team named "Golden☆Lovers" in January 2009. On October 3, 2014, Omega announced he was leaving DDT and signing with NJPW, where Ibushi was already a semi-regular. However, with Ibushi having recently moved to NJPW's heavyweight division, Omega stated that the Golden☆Lovers were done as a tag team due to him wanting to remain in the junior heavyweight division. The Golden☆Lovers wrestled their final match together on October 26, 2014, when they defeated Danshoku Dino and Konosuke Takeshita in Omega's DDT farewell match. On January 28, 2018 at The New Beginning in Sapporo, the Golden☆Lovers were reformed, with Ibushi saving Omega from an attack from Cody. Omega and Ibushi teamed for the first time since 2014 at the Honor Rising: Japan 2018 events. At night two of Honor Rising: Japan, the Golden☆Lovers, after a victory over Cody and Marty Scurll, were interrupted by The Young Bucks who announced they were moving up to NJPW's heavyweight tag team division. A match between Golden☆Lovers and The Young Bucks was announced for Strong Style Evolved on February 26.

== Results ==
No.	Results	Stipulations	Times
1	Roppongi 3K (Rocky Romero, Sho and Yoh) defeated SoCal Uncensored (Christopher Daniels, Frankie Kazarian and Scorpio Sky)	Six-man tag team match	11:02
2	Taguchi Japan (Juice Robinson and David Finlay) defeated Chaos (Hirooki Goto and Gedo)	Tag team match	7:24
3	Killer Elite Squad (Lance Archer and Davey Boy Smith Jr.) defeated Chaos (Toru Yano and Chuckie T.)	Tag team match	10:48
4	Bullet Club (Cody and Marty Scurll) defeated Guerrillas of Destiny (Tama Tonga and Tanga Loa)	Tag team match	10:45
5	Los Ingobernables de Japón (Tetsuya Naito, Sanada, Bushi and Hiromu Takahashi) defeated Taguchi Japan (Hiroshi Tanahashi, Kushida and Ryusuke Taguchi) and Dragon Lee	Eight-man tag team match	12:13
6	Will Ospreay defeated Jyushin Thunder Liger	Singles match	10:35
7	Suzuki-gun (Minoru Suzuki and Zack Sabre Jr.) defeated Chaos (Kazuchika Okada and Tomohiro Ishii)	Tag team match	18:50
8	Jay White (c) defeated Hangman Page	Singles match for the IWGP United States Heavyweight Championship	25:00
9	Golden☆Lovers (Kenny Omega and Kota Ibushi) defeated The Young Bucks (Matt Jackson and Nick Jackson)	Tag team match	39:21
(c) / – the champion(s) heading into the match

== Aftermath ==
At the show, NJPW announced there will be another G1 Special event taking place in the San Francisco area on July 7, 2018, at the Cow Palace in Daly City, California. The following day on March 26, NJPW announced the follow up to Strong Style Evolved, Strong Style Evolved UK, occurring on June 30 and July 1.

== See also ==
- NJPW Invasion Tour 2011
- G1 Special in USA
- World Wrestling Peace Festival
- Global Wars
- ROH/NJPW War of the Worlds
- Strong Style Evolved
