= G1 Special in San Francisco =

2018 New Japan Pro-Wrestling event

- Promotional poster featuring various NJPW wrestlers
- Promotion: New Japan Pro-Wrestling
- Date: July 7, 2018
- City: Daly City, California, U.S.
- Venue: Cow Palace
- Attendance: 6,333

Event chronology
← Previous; Strong Style Evolved UK	Next → G1 Climax 28; Destruction

G1 Special chronology
← Previous; G1 Special in USA	Next → G1 Climax in Dallas

G1 Special in San Francisco was a professional wrestling event promoted by New Japan Pro-Wrestling (NJPW). The event took place on July 7, 2018, at the Cow Palace in the San Francisco suburb of Daly City, California.

The event was broadcast on AXS TV in the United States.

== Production ==
Other on-screen personnel
Role:	Name:
English commentators	Jim Ross
English commentators	Josh Barnett
Japanese commentators	Hiroki Yamazaki
Japanese commentators	Yusuke Okamoto
Japanese commentators	Milano Collection AT
Japanese commentators	Miki Motoi
Ring announcers	Makoto Abe
Referees	Kenta Sato
Referees	Marty Asami
Referees	Red Shoes Unno
Referees	Tiger Hattori

=== Background ===
On March 25, 2018, NJPW announced there would be another G1 Special event taking place in the San Francisco area on July 7, 2018, at the Cow Palace in Daly City, California. While tickets for the first G1 Special event sold out in two hours, Pro Wrestling Torch reported that NJPW management was upset with the initial ticket sales for G1 Special in San Francisco. Nonetheless 6,333 is currently NJPW biggest attendance to date in the United States.

=== Storylines ===
Official logo of the event

G1 Special in San Francisco featured professional wrestling matches that involved wrestlers from pre-existing scripted feuds, plots, and storylines that played out on NJPW shows. Wrestlers portrayed heroes or villains as they followed a series of events that built tension and culminated in a wrestling match or series of matches.

On June 9 at Dominion 6.9 in Osaka-jo Hall, Kenny Omega defeated Kazuchika Okada 2 falls to 1 to win the IWGP Heavyweight Championship for the first time, ending Okada's reign, the longest in the championship's history at 720 days. After the match, after making peace with The Young Bucks (Matt and Nick Jackson) in the ring, Omega would announce during the post match comments that himself, Ibushi, and The Young Bucks had the formed a new sub group "The Golden☆Elite". The following day at a press conference aired on NJPW World, Kenny Omega confirmed that he and The Young Bucks were still Bullet Club members, as well as clarifying that while Kota Ibushi had joined The Elite, he was not a member of Bullet Club. Omega also claimed he was still the leader of Bullet Club, and announced that his first defense of the IWGP Heavyweight Championship would be against Cody at the G1 Special at the Cow Palace in San Francisco.

On January 28, 2018, at The New Beginning in Sapporo, "Switchblade" Jay White defeated Omega to become the IWGP United States Champion. At Dominion 6.9 in Osaka-jo Hall White lost by pinfall in a tag team match to Juice Robinson; because of this loss White would defend his title against Robinson at G1 Special.

During the 25th Best of the Super Juniors tournament Dragon Lee defeated eventual tournament winner Hiromu Takahashi. At Dominion Takahashi defeated Will Ospreay to win the IWGP Junior Heavyweight Championship. Backstage, after a successful title defense against El Desperado, Hiromu challenged Lee to a match, which Lee accepted. The match was officially announced for G1 Special on June 21 via NJPW's website.

On June 9 at Dominion, The Young Bucks defeated Sanada and Evil of Los Ingobernables de Japón to win the IWGP Heavyweight Tag Team Championships for the first time, making them the third duo in Bullet Club to do so. After the match, The Young Bucks offered them a rematch for the titles. One day later, it was announced that their first defense of the IWGP Tag Team Championship would be against Sanada and Evil at G1 Special.

At Kizuna Road Hirooki Goto defeated Michael Elgin to regain the NEVER Openweight Championship; after the match he was challenged by Jeff Cobb and the match was made for G1 Special on June 21.

At Dominion Marty Scurll, Hangman Page, and Cody defeated Hiroshi Tanahashi, Jushin Thunder Liger, and Rey Mysterio Jr. A match between Tanahashi and KUSHIDA against Scurll and Page at G1 Special was also officially announced on June 21.

On June 9 at Dominion Minoru Suzuki and Zack Sabre Jr. defeated Tomohiro Ishii and Toru Yano. Suzuki and Ishii brawled after the match. This led to three matches being made for Strong Style Evolved UK. On Night 1, Suzuki and Sabre would defend the RPW Undisputed British Tag Team Championship against Ishii and Kazuchika Okada, while on Night 2 Okada faced Sabre and Ishii defended the RPW British Heavyweight Championship against Suzuki. On June 21, a rematch pitting Suzuki and Sabre against Ishii and Yano was announced for G1 Special.

== Aftermath ==
During the match for the Junior Heavyweight Title, Takahashi received a Dragon Driver from Dragon Lee and landed on his neck. Backstage, after winning the match, Takahashi fainted and was sent to a hospital. It was later revealed that Takahashi had broken his neck.

== Results ==
No.	Results	Stipulations	Times
1	Bullet Club (King Haku, Tama Tonga, Tanga Loa, Yujiro Takahashi and Chase Owens) defeated Chaos (Yoshi-Hashi, Gedo, Rocky Romero, Yoh and Sho)	Ten-man tag team match	09:20
2	Chaos (Tomohiro Ishii and Toru Yano) defeated Suzuki-gun (Minoru Suzuki and Zack Sabre Jr.)	Tag team match	09:42
3	Bullet Club (Hangman Page and Marty Scurll) defeated Taguchi Japan (Hiroshi Tanahashi and Kushida)	Tag team match	09:52
4	Hirooki Goto (c) defeated Jeff Cobb	Singles match for the NEVER Openweight Championship	12:10
5	The Young Bucks (Matt Jackson and Nick Jackson) (c) defeated Los Ingobernables de Japón (Sanada and Evil)	Tag team match for the IWGP Tag Team Championship	16:05
6	Chaos (Kazuchika Okada and Will Ospreay) defeated Los Ingobernables de Japón (Tetsuya Naito and Bushi)	Tag team match	11:58
7	Hiromu Takahashi (c) defeated Dragon Lee	Singles match for the IWGP Junior Heavyweight Championship	16:18
8	Juice Robinson defeated Jay White (c)	Singles match for the IWGP United States Heavyweight Championship	23:22
9	Kenny Omega (c) defeated Cody	Singles match for the IWGP Heavyweight Championship	34:14
(c) / – the champion(s) heading into the match

== See also ==
- NJPW Invasion Tour 2011
- G1 Special in USA
- Strong Style Evolved
- World Wrestling Peace Festival
- Global Wars
- ROH/NJPW War of the Worlds
