= G1 Special in USA =

2017 professional wrestling event

- Official logo of the event
- Promotion: New Japan Pro-Wrestling
- Date: July 1 and 2, 2017
- City: Long Beach, California, U.S.
- Venue: Long Beach Convention and Entertainment Center
- Attendance: Night 1: 2,370; Night 2: 2,305

Event chronology
← Previous; Dominion 6.11 in Osaka-jo Hall; Lion's Gate Project 6; Kizuna Road 2017	Next → Lion's Gate Project 7; G1 Climax 27; War of the Worlds UK

G1 Special chronology
← Previous; First	Next → G1 Special in San Francisco

G1 Special in USA was a two-day professional wrestling event promoted by New Japan Pro-Wrestling (NJPW). The two shows took place on July 1 and 2, 2017, in Long Beach, California, United States at the Long Beach Convention and Entertainment Center. These were the first NJPW shows that the promotion had produced independently in the U.S.

The event's name refers to the annual G1 Climax tournament as these shows also served as a prelude to the 2017 G1 Climax. The event is notable for the crowning of the inaugural IWGP United States Heavyweight Champion.

== Production ==
Other on-screen personnel
Role:	Name:
English commentators	Jim Ross
English commentators	Josh Barnett
Japanese commentators	Katsuhiko Kanazawa
Japanese commentators	Shunpei Terakawa
Japanese commentators	Kota Ibushi
Ring announcer	Makoto Abe

=== Background ===
In December 2016, Pro Wrestling Insider reported that New Japan Pro-Wrestling (NJPW) was planning to hold the first two nights of the 2017 G1 Climax in the United States with New England–based wrestling personality George Carroll and wrestler Rocky Romero reportedly doing ground work for the dates in Long Beach, California. On January 4, 2017, during Wrestle Kingdom 11 in Tokyo Dome, NJPW officially announced the shows for July 1 and 2, 2017, taking place at the Long Beach Convention and Entertainment Center. These shows, however, would not be part of the G1 Climax, but would instead serve as a prelude to the tournament, which would take place between July 17 and August 13. The shows would mark the first time NJPW presented shows in the United States independently, as opposed to partnering with an American promotion. NJPW had previously partnered with Jersey All Pro Wrestling (JAPW) for the NJPW Invasion Tour 2011 and since 2014 they have been partnered with Ring of Honor (ROH), co-producing shows annually in North America.

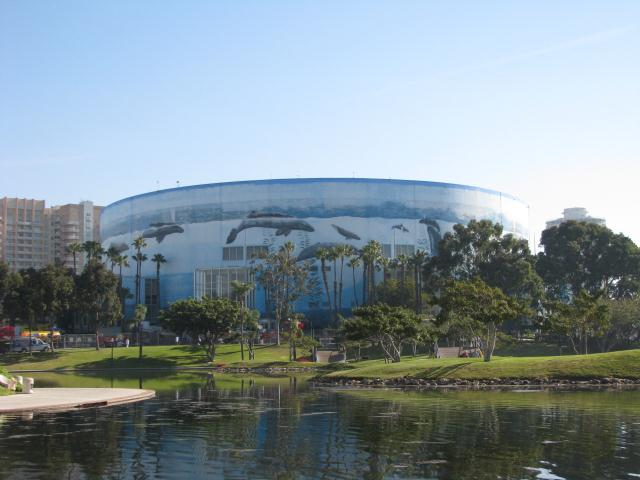
Long Beach Arena, part of the Long Beach Convention and Entertainment Center

After announcing the Long Beach shows, NJPW went public with their plan of an American expansion, which included establishing a subsidiary and running extended tours in the United States with California as the base, while also establishing a dojo for training Americans in Los Angeles, run by Rocky Romero. The full-scale running of the American market was set to launch in 2018. According to NJPW owner Takaaki Kidani, the plan was a direct response to WWE taking four wrestlers, including AJ Styles and Shinsuke Nakamura, from NJPW in January 2016. Tickets for the shows as well as meet-and-greets were put on sale on April 1 and sold out within hours, despite NJPW not having announced any matches for the two shows. Tickets were purchased in 37 states, including Alaska and Hawaii. Three days later, NJPW announced the first group of wrestlers taking part in the event; Kazuchika Okada, Tetsuya Naito, Hiroshi Tanahashi and Kenny Omega. In May, NJPW put additional seats for the shows on sale, which were also quickly sold out. NJPW later claimed that the original tickets sold out in two hours and the additional tickets in two minutes.

On May 12, during the third night of the NJPW and ROH co-produced War of the Worlds tour in New York City, it was announced that NJPW would hold a tournament to crown the inaugural IWGP United States Heavyweight Champion during the G1 Special in USA weekend. It was also announced that both the IWGP Heavyweight and IWGP Intercontinental Championships would be defended during the weekend. On May 18, NJPW held a press conference in Los Angeles to announce further details for the shows. This included the addition of 36 wrestlers to the shows, including Jay Lethal, The Briscoes (Jay Briscoe and Mark Briscoe) and War Machine (Hanson and Raymond Rowe) from ROH and Dragon Lee, Titán and Volador Jr. from the Mexican Consejo Mundial de Lucha Libre (CMLL) promotion. It was also announced that both the IWGP Tag Team and IWGP Junior Heavyweight Tag Team Championships would be defended during the weekend in addition to the previously announced titles.

The two shows would air live through NJPW's internet streaming site, NJPW World, with English commentary. However, the first night would only air live outside of the United States, where both nights air on the AXS TV network; the first night live and the second night on tape delay on July 7. The English commentary for the shows would be provided by Jim Ross and Josh Barnett. On June 21, the Canadian Fight Network announced that it would also air the first night live.

On June 12, NJPW announced the full card for the first night as well as a partial card for the second night. The full card for night two was revealed after the conclusion of night one. The release of the cards brought with them some negative reactions, mostly centered around American wrestlers Cody and Billy Gunn receiving shots at the IWGP Heavyweight and IWGP Intercontinental Championships, respectively.

=== Storylines ===
G1 Special in USA featured professional wrestling matches that involved different wrestlers from pre-existing scripted feuds and storylines. Wrestlers portrayed villains, heroes, or less distinguishable characters in the scripted events that built tension and culminated in a wrestling match or series of matches.

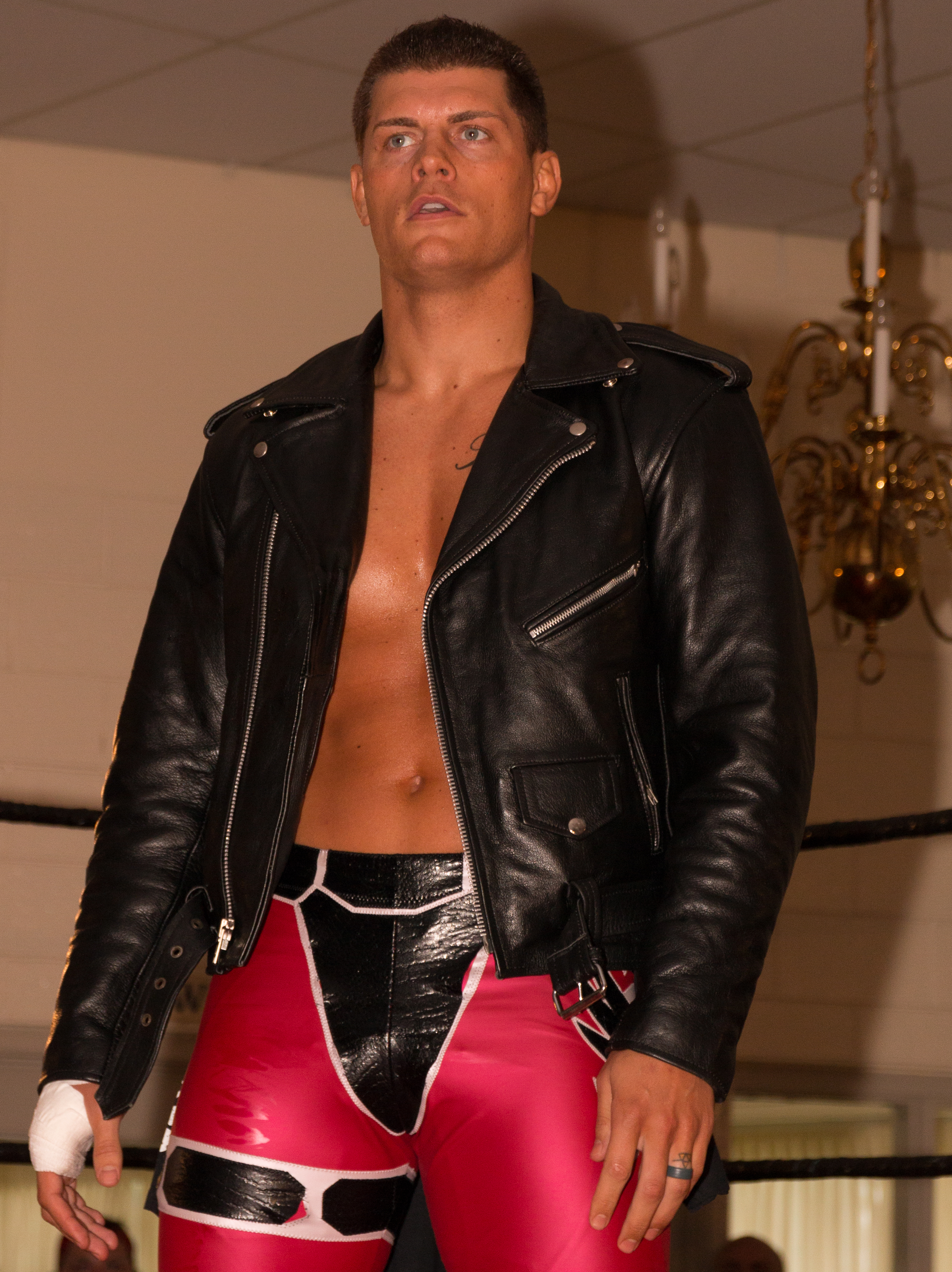
Cody, who challenged for the IWGP Heavyweight Championship in the main event of the first night

The first night would be headlined by Kazuchika Okada defending the IWGP Heavyweight Championship against Cody. The match was set up on June 11 at Dominion 6.11 in Osaka-jo Hall, where Cody, after defeating Michael Elgin, challenged Okada. After the main event of the show, where Okada had successfully defended the IWGP Heavyweight Championship by wrestling Cody's Bullet Club stablemate Kenny Omega to a 60-minute time limit draw, Cody repeated the challenge, which was accepted by Okada. Cody debuted for NJPW at Wrestle Kingdom 11 in Tokyo Dome on January 4, 2017, and went undefeated in his three singles matches in the promotion prior to the Long Beach show. Okada, while admitting he still did not know Cody or what he was capable of, accepted the challenge due to Cody being an American and his popularity in the United States. On June 23, Cody captured the ROH World Championship, turning the main event into a rare battle of world champions from two major promotions. The last champion versus champion match of this type took place in 2005 between IWGP Heavyweight Champion Hiroyoshi Tenzan and Triple Crown Heavyweight Champion Satoshi Kojima.

In the second title match of the first night, Guerrillas of Destiny (Tama Tonga and Tanga Loa) were set to defend the IWGP Tag Team Championship against War Machine (Hanson and Raymond Rowe). This would be a rematch from Dominion 6.11 in Osaka-jo Hall, where the Guerrillas of Destiny became the new champions through cheating after Loa hit Rowe with a steel chair behind the referee's back.

The first night would also feature all four first round matches in the IWGP United States Heavyweight Championship tournament. The first match would take place between ROH wrestlers Hangman Page and Jay Lethal, who were the first two wrestlers to show interest in being part of the tournament, when the title was announced. The second match would see Juice Robinson take on Zack Sabre Jr. The two met as part of a NEVER Openweight 6-Man Tag Team Championship gauntlet match at Dominion 6.11 in Osaka-jo Hall. After Robinson had eliminated Sabre's Suzuki-gun team from the match, Sabre attacked Robinson and locked him in a submission hold. In the third match, Tetsuya Naito would take on Tomohiro Ishii in a rematch from Wrestling Dontaku 2016, where Naito successfully defended the IWGP Heavyweight Championship against Ishii. Naito had previously criticized the idea of the IWGP United States Heavyweight Championship, claiming that it would hurt the IWGP Intercontinental Championship, which he held at the time. Naito had even brought up the idea of retiring the Intercontinental Championship prior to losing it and now stated that upon winning the tournament, he was going to immediately retire the United States Heavyweight Championship and throw the title belt in the garbage. In the final first round match Kenny Omega was set to take on Michael Elgin. Elgin went into the match holding two straight victories over Omega with their most recent match against each other having taken place during the 2016 G1 Climax.

The second night would see Hiroshi Tanahashi defend the IWGP Intercontinental Championship against Billy Gunn. Gunn had arrived in NJPW during the 2016 World Tag League as part of Yoshitatsu's Hunter Club stable. In May 2017, Yoshitatsu relayed a message from Gunn to Tanahashi, requesting a match between the two. After capturing the IWGP Intercontinental Championship from Tetsuya Naito at Dominion 6.11 in Osaka-jo Hall, Tanahashi immediately nominated Gunn as his first challenger.

The IWGP Junior Heavyweight Tag Team Championship would be defended during the second night with champions The Young Bucks (Matt Jackson and Nick Jackson) taking on Roppongi Vice (Beretta and Rocky Romero) in another rematch from Dominion 6.11 in Osaka-jo Hall, where The Young Bucks captured the title from Roppongi Vice.

The second night would also feature the conclusion of the IWGP United States Heavyweight Championship tournament with two semifinal matches and a final match.

== Reception ==
Following the event, it was noted that there were issues with AXS TV's production and commentary. Tama Tonga commented on the announcing, stating that it "sucked", adding that Kevin Kelly, the regular English announcer on NJPW World who did not announce the shows, "at least [...] knows the storylines and our f#cking names". Kenny Omega also voiced his support for Kelly and his broadcast partner Don Callis. Dave Meltzer reported that Kelly and Callis were in Long Beach and wanted to announce the shows "really bad", but AXS TV made the call to use their regular announce team of Jim Ross and Josh Barnett, adding that there was "a lot of infighting". Larry Csonka in his review of the first night for 411Mania, stated that Ross and Barnett "do a great job on the weekly, in studio and post produced calls for NJPW on AXS TV", but felt that the announcing on the live show was "really rough". Csonka also noted other production issues, including cameras missing important shots, bumper music playing over theme music and ring announcers starting and stopping their announcements.

== Aftermath ==
Takaaki Kidani dubbed the event a big success, while announcing plans to tour the United States in March or April 2018 at the latest. He also stated that NJPW was going to open an office in Los Angeles before the end of 2017, with a dojo to be opened at the start of 2018.

On November 5, 2017, NJPW announced Strong Style Evolved, the follow-up event to G1 Special in USA, which took place on March 25, 2018, at the Walter Pyramid in Long Beach, California. It was at that show that NJPW Chairman Naoki Sugabayashi announced there would be another G1 Special event taking place on July 7, 2018, in the San Francisco Bay Area at the Cow Palace in Daly City, California.

== Results ==
Night 1

No.	Results	Stipulations	Times
1	Chaos (Beretta, Jay Briscoe, Mark Briscoe, Rocky Romero and Will Ospreay) defeated Bullet Club (Bad Luck Fale, Marty Scurll, Matt Jackson, Nick Jackson and Yujiro Takahashi)	Ten-man tag team match	09:21
2	Los Ingobernables de Japón (Bushi, Evil, Hiromu Takahashi and Sanada) defeated Dragon Lee, Jyushin Thunder Liger, Titán and Volador Jr.	Eight-man tag team match	06:44
3	Jay Lethal defeated Hangman Page	Singles match; first round in the IWGP United States Heavyweight Championship tournament	08:30
4	Zack Sabre Jr. defeated Juice Robinson	Singles match; first round in the IWGP United States Heavyweight Championship tournament	10:04
5	Jay White and Taguchi Japan (David Finlay, Hiroshi Tanahashi and Kushida) defeated Hunter Club (Billy Gunn and Yoshitatsu) and The Tempura Boyz (Sho Tanaka and Yohei Komatsu)	Eight-man tag team match	09:40
6	War Machine (Hanson and Raymond Rowe) defeated Guerrillas of Destiny (Tama Tonga and Tanga Loa) (c)	No Disqualification match for the IWGP Tag Team Championship	11:06
7	Tomohiro Ishii defeated Tetsuya Naito	Singles match; first round in the IWGP United States Heavyweight Championship tournament	15:51
8	Kenny Omega (with Matt Jackson and Nick Jackson) defeated Michael Elgin	Singles match; first round in the IWGP United States Heavyweight Championship tournament	22:31
9	Kazuchika Okada (c) (with Gedo) defeated Cody (with Brandi Rhodes)	Singles match for the IWGP Heavyweight Championship	27:12
(c) / – the champion(s) heading into the match

Night 2

No.	Results	Stipulations	Times
1	Jyushin Thunder Liger and Taguchi Japan (David Finlay and Kushida) defeated The Tempura Boyz (Sho Tanaka and Yohei Komatsu) and Yoshitatsu	Six-man tag team match	08:52
2	Kenny Omega defeated Jay Lethal	Singles match; semifinals in the IWGP United States Heavyweight Championship tournament	12:56
3	Tomohiro Ishii defeated Zack Sabre Jr.	Singles match; semifinals in the IWGP United States Heavyweight Championship tournament	11:42
4	Dragon Lee, Jay White, Juice Robinson, Titán and Volador Jr. defeated Los Ingobernables de Japón (Bushi, Evil, Hiromu Takahashi, Sanada and Tetsuya Naito)	Ten-man tag team match	12:28
5	Bullet Club (Hangman Page, Tama Tonga and Tanga Loa) (with Chase Owens and King Haku) defeated Michael Elgin and War Machine (Hanson and Raymond Rowe)	Six-man tag team match	11:17
6	The Young Bucks (Matt Jackson and Nick Jackson) (c) defeated Roppongi Vice (Beretta and Rocky Romero)	Tag team match for the IWGP Junior Heavyweight Tag Team Championship	22:41
7	Bullet Club (Bad Luck Fale, Cody, Marty Scurll and Yujiro Takahashi) (with Brandi Rhodes) defeated Chaos (Jay Briscoe, Kazuchika Okada, Mark Briscoe and Will Ospreay) (with Gedo)	Eight-man tag team match	16:00
8	Hiroshi Tanahashi (c) defeated Billy Gunn	Singles match for the IWGP Intercontinental Championship	14:25
9	Kenny Omega (with Matt Jackson and Nick Jackson) defeated Tomohiro Ishii	Singles match; finals of a tournament to determine the inaugural IWGP United States Heavyweight Champion	31:20
(c) / – the champion(s) heading into the match

=== Tournament bracket ===
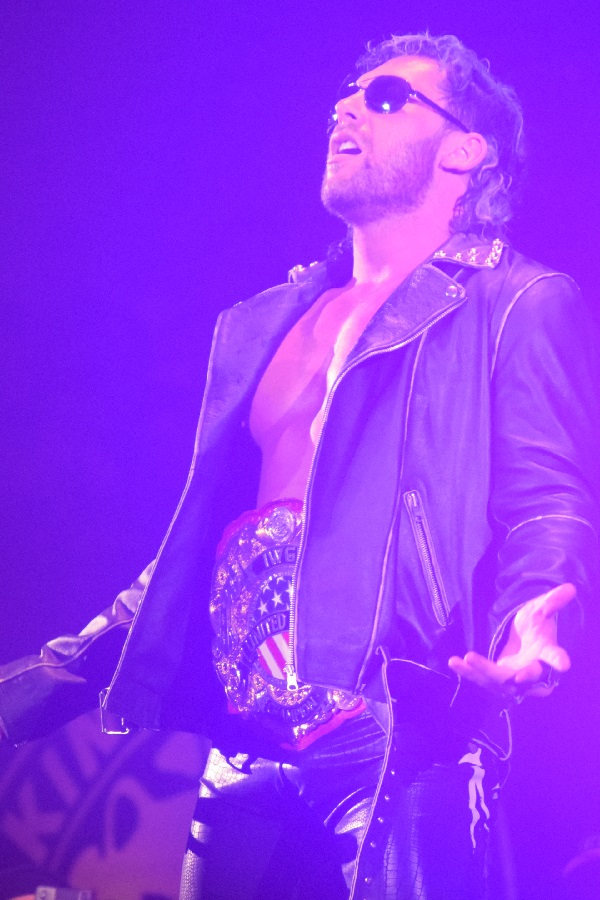
Kenny Omega, the winner of the tournament and inaugural IWGP United States Heavyweight Champion

First round (July 1)
Michael Elgin	22:31
Kenny Omega	Pin
Jay Lethal	Pin
Hangman Page	08:30
Juice Robinson	Sub
Zack Sabre Jr.	10:04
Tomohiro Ishii	Pin
Tetsuya Naito	15:51

Semifinals (July 2)
Kenny Omega	Pin
Jay Lethal	12:56
Zack Sabre Jr.	Pin
Tomohiro Ishii	11:42

Final (July 2)
Kenny Omega	Pin
Tomohiro Ishii	31:20

== See also ==
- NJPW Invasion Tour 2011
- G1 Special in San Francisco
- Strong Style Evolved
- World Wrestling Peace Festival
- Global Wars
- ROH/NJPW War of the Worlds
