= IWGP Global Heavyweight Championship =

Professional wrestling championship

- Current title design (2023–present)

Details
- Promotion: New Japan Pro-Wrestling (NJPW)
- Date established: December 11, 2023
- Current champion: Gabe Kidd
- Date won: July 6, 2026

Other names
- IWGP Global Heavyweight Championship (2023–present); IWGP Global Championship
Statistics
- First champion: David Finlay
- Most reigns: David Finlay, Yota Tsuji and Gabe Kidd (2 reigns)
- Longest reign: David Finlay (2nd reign, 245 days)
- Shortest reign: Shota Umino (22 days)
- Oldest champion: Nic Nemeth (43 years, 6 months and 27 days)
- Youngest champion: Gabe Kidd (28 years, 1 month and 22 days)
- Heaviest champion: Gabe Kidd (235 lb (107 kg))
- Lightest champion: David Finlay (209 lb (95 kg))

The IWGP Global Heavyweight Championship (IWGP GLOBALヘビー級王座, IWGP GLOBAL hebī-kyū ōza) is a professional wrestling championship owned and promoted by the New Japan Pro-Wrestling (NJPW) promotion. "IWGP" are the initials of NJPW's governing body, the International Wrestling Grand Prix (インターナショナル・レスリング・グラン・プリ, intānashonaru resuringu guran puri). The title was created when the IWGP United States Heavyweight Championship was retired. The current champion is Gabe Kidd, who is in his record-tying second reign. He won the title by defeating Shota Umino on Night 6 of Road to G1 Climax 36 on July 6, 2026.

== History ==
=== Background ===
At 2023's Power Struggle, after Will Ospreay had defended the IWGP United States Heavyweight Championship against Shota Umino in the main event, Bullet Club leader David Finlay attacked Umino's former mentor, AEW's Jon Moxley, and Ospreay, and proceeded to destroy both the U.S. belt and Ospreay's custom IWGP United Kingdom Heavyweight Championship belt with a mallet, saying he felt spurned by both lands the belts represented. Finlay's manager, Gedo, stated that Finlay deserved a championship of his own.

At the Power Struggle post-media scrum, Ospreay declared that if the IWGP Intercontinental Championship could not be brought back, then he, Moxley, and Finlay should wrestle for a new title at Wrestle Kingdom 18. At a press conference on November 6, 2023, NJPW chairman Naoki Sugabayashi effectively announced the retirement of the United States title, and that the three-way match would indeed be for a brand new championship. On December 11, at another press conference, he announced the name of the new championship, the IWGP Global Heavyweight Championship. Finlay would go on to win the match at Wrestle Kingdom and be crowned the inaugural champion.

=== Belt design ===
The new championship belt was revealed on January 3, 2024. It is set on a white strap, similar to the now-retired IWGP Intercontinental Championship, and features five plates: one center and two sets of side plates. The center plate features depictions of lions on each side, the "IWGP" letters in the center, and the words (all in capital letters) "Global" and "Champion" on the top and bottom, respectively; the New Japan logo is also featured on the top. Four gold circles with a ruby in the center are vertically set, two on each side, next to the center plate. The two sets of side plates each feature different parts of the world globe.

== Reigns ==
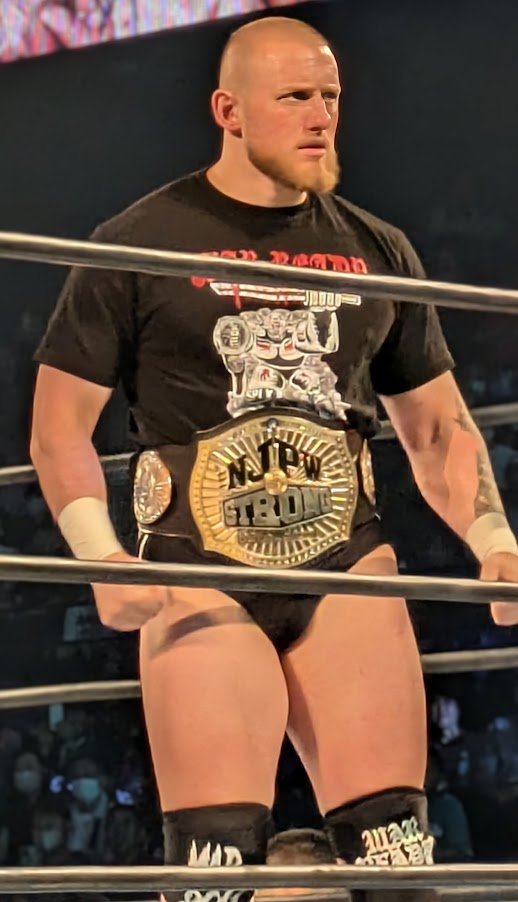
Two-time and current champion Gabe Kidd

As of November 3, 2026, there have been eight reigns shared among six wrestlers. David Finlay was the inaugural champion and is tied with Yota Tsuji and Gabe Kidd for the most reigns at two. Finlay's second reign was the longest at 245 days, with four successful defenses. Shota Umino had the shortest reign at 22 days. Tsuji was the first Japanese wrestler to win the championship and has the most successful title defenses between both of his reigns at seven, and he has the most combined days holding the title at 364. Nic Nemeth was the oldest champion when he won it at 43 years old. Kidd is the youngest champion, winning it at 28 years old.

Gabe Kidd is the current champion in his record-tying second reign. He won the title by defeating Shota Umino on Night 6 of Road to G1 Climax 36 in Tokyo, Japan, on July 6, 2026.

Key
No.	Overall reign number
Reign	Reign number for the specific champion
Days	Number of days held
Defenses	Number of successful defenses
+	Current reign is changing daily

No.	Champion	Championship change			Reign statistics			Notes	Ref.
No.	Champion	Date	Event	Location	Reign	Days	Defenses	Notes	Ref.
New Japan Pro Wrestling (NJPW)
1	David Finlay	January 4, 2024	Wrestle Kingdom 18	Tokyo, Japan	1	50	0	Defeated Will Ospreay and Jon Moxley in a three-way match to become the inaugural champion.	
2	Nic Nemeth	February 23, 2024	The New Beginning in Sapporo: Night 1	Sapporo, Japan	1	71	1		
3	David Finlay	May 4, 2024	Wrestling Dontaku: Night 2	Fukuoka, Japan	2	245	4		
4	Yota Tsuji	January 4, 2025	Wrestle Kingdom 19	Tokyo, Japan	1	162	4		
5	Gabe Kidd	June 15, 2025	Dominion 6.15 in Osaka-jo Hall	Osaka, Japan	1	120	2		
6	Yota Tsuji	October 13, 2025	King of Pro-Wrestling	Tokyo, Japan	2	202	3		
7	Andrade El Ídolo	May 3, 2026	Wrestling Dontaku; Night 1	Fukuoka, Japan	1	42	0		
8	Shota Umino	June 14, 2026	Dominion 6.14 in Osaka-jo Hall	Osaka, Japan	1	22	1	This was a three-way match, also involving Drilla Moloney.	
9	Gabe Kidd	July 6, 2026	Road to G1 Climax 36; Night 6	Tokyo, Japan	2	120+	3		

== Combined reigns ==
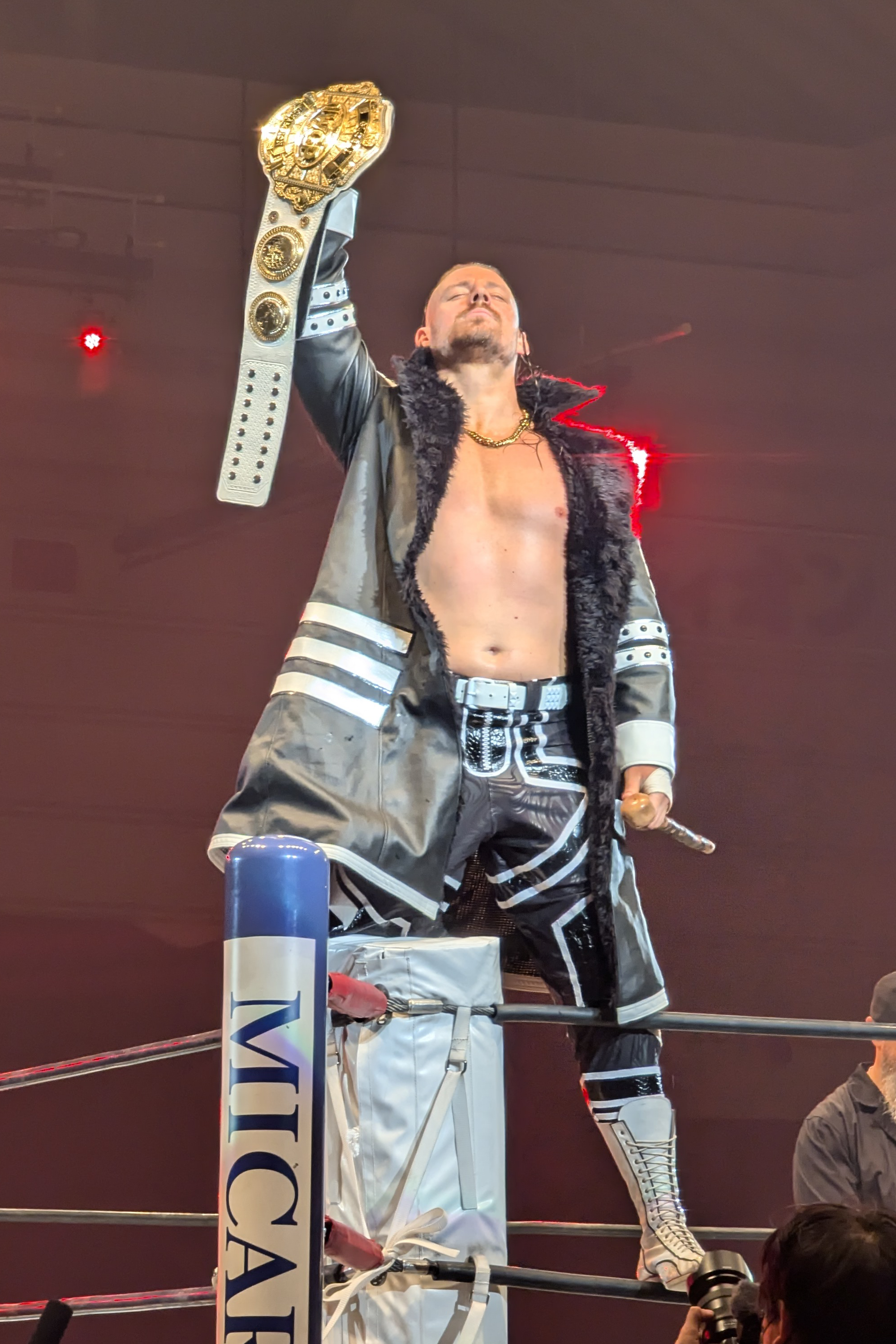
Record-tying two-time champions David Finlay and Yota Tsuji.

As of November 3, 2026.

†	Indicates the current champion

Rank	Wrestler	No. of reigns	Combined defenses	Combined days
1	Yota Tsuji	2	7	364
2	David Finlay	2	4	295
3	Gabe Kidd †	2	5	240+
4	Nic Nemeth	1	1	71
5	Andrade El Ídolo	1	0	42
6	Shota Umino	1	1	22

Sporting positions
Preceded by IWGP Intercontinental Championship; IWGP United States Heavyweight Championship	New Japan Pro-Wrestling's secondary heavyweight championship 2023–present	Succeeded by Current
