= Strong Style Evolved UK =

2018 professional wrestling event

- Promotional poster featuring Kazuchika Okada
- Promotion(s): New Japan Pro-Wrestling; Revolution Pro Wrestling
- Date: June 30, 2018; July 1, 2018
- City: Milton Keynes, Buckinghamshire, England; Altrincham, Greater Manchester, England
- Venue: Planet Ice Milton Keynes; Planet Ice Altrincham
- Attendance: Night 1: 2,500; Night 2: 3,000

Event chronology
| ← Previous (NJPW) CEO x NJPW: When Worlds Collide (RPW) Live in Southampton 3 | Next → (NJPW) G1 Special in San Francisco (RPW) Live at the Cockpit 30 |

Strong Style Evolved chronology
| ← Previous; 2018 | Next → 2021 |

Strong Style Evolved UK was a two-day professional wrestling event promoted by New Japan Pro-Wrestling (NJPW), in partnership with Revolution Pro Wrestling (RPW). It took place on June 30 and July 1, 2018 at Planet Ice Milton Keynes in Milton Keynes, Buckinghamshire, England and Planet Ice Altrincham in Altrincham, Greater Manchester, England. The event was streamed on demand on RPW on Demand and NJPW World.

The event was themed around Chaos versus Suzuki-gun matches and featured participation of wrestlers from both NJPW and RPW. Three RPW championships were defended, including the British Heavyweight Championship.

== Production ==
Other on-screen personnel
| Role: | Name: |
|---|---|
| Commentators | Kevin Kelly |
| Commentators | Andy Boy Simmonz |
| Ring announcers | James Daniels |
| Referees | Chris Roberts |
| Referees | Chris Sharpe |

=== Background ===
On March 25, 2018, NJPW held Strong Style Evolved at the Walter Pyramid in Long Beach, California, U.S. The following day on March 26, NJPW announced the follow-up to Strong Style Evolved, Strong Style Evolved UK, occurring on June 30 and July 1. The event will be held in conjunction with NJPW's British partner RPW; the two promotions had established a working relationships in 2015 as a part of NJPW's "New IWGP Conception."

Tickets for the event were put on pre-sale on March 27 and 29. Tickets for meet-and-greets were also later put on sale.

On May 3, it was announced that Kazuchika Okada would take part in the event. Later in May and June, it was announced that Tomohiro Ishii, Taiji Ishimori, Minoru Suzuki, Toru Yano, Yuji Nagata, Will Ospreay, Taichi, Jay White, Shota Umino, Zack Sabre Jr., Takashi Iizuka, and NJPW LA Dojo graduate Dan Duggan would be participating at the event.

The event will air on the NJPW World and RPW On Demand streaming services, and will feature English commentary from Kevin Kelly.

On June 11, NJPW and RPW began revealing matches for the event.

=== Storylines ===
At Dominion 6.9 in Osaka-jo Hall, the Suzuki-gun team of Minoru Suzuki and Zack Sabre Jr. defeated the Chaos team of Tomohiro Ishii and Toru Yano. After the match Suzuki and Ishii had a confrontation, which set up a British Heavyweight Championship match for this event.

At Sakura Genesis, Kazuchika Okada successfully defended the IWGP Heavyweight Championship in the main event against Zack Sabre Jr. A rematch was then scheduled for this event.

As a preview for both these matches, the first night featured a tag team match for the Undisputed British Tag Team Championship between the teams of Suzuki/Sabre Jr. and Okada/Ishii.

Jay White's opponent in his night 2 match was scheduled to be Chris Brookes. However, Brookes fell ill and had to be replaced by Kyle Fletcher.

== Results ==
=== Night 1 ===
| No. | Results | Stipulations | Times |
|---|---|---|---|
| 1 | Great-O-Kharn defeated Shota Umino | Singles match | 10:02 |
| 2 | Bullet Club (Taiji Ishimori and Yujiro Takahashi) defeated Aussie Open (Mark Davis and Kyle Fletcher) | Tag team match | 12:57 |
| 3 | Tiger Mask defeated David Starr | Singles match | 11:01 |
| 4 | Suzuki-gun (Takashi Iizuka, Taichi and El Desperado) defeated Chaos (Jay White, Toru Yano and Gedo) | Six-man tag team match | 10:40 |
| 5 | Walter defeated Yuji Nagata | Singles match | 12:27 |
| 6 | Yoshi-Hashi defeated Chris Brookes | Singles match | 9:03 |
| 7 | Will Ospreay defeated Yoshinobu Kanemaru | Singles match | 10:59 |
| 8 | Suzuki-gun (Minoru Suzuki and Zack Sabre Jr.) (c) defeated Chaos (Kazuchika Okada and Tomohiro Ishii) by submission | Tag team match for the Undisputed British Tag Team Championship | 25:45 |
(c) / – the champion(s) heading into the match

=== Night 2 ===
| No. | Results | Stipulations | Times |
|---|---|---|---|
| 1 | Great-O-Kharn defeated Dan Duggan | Singles match | 10:11 |
| 2 | Yuji Nagata defeated Shota Umino by submission | Singles match | 7:39 |
| 3 | Suzuki-gun (Takashi Iizuka, Yoshinobu Kanemaru and El Desperado) defeated Chaos (Yoshi-Hashi, Toru Yano and Gedo) | Six-man tag team match | 10:46 |
| 4 | Walter defeated Yujiro Takahashi | Singles match | 8:38 |
| 5 | Taichi defeated Will Ospreay | Singles match | 13:50 |
| 6 | David Starr (c) defeated Tiger Mask, Taiji Ishimori and El Phantasmo | Four-way match for the British Cruiserweight Championship | 11:54 |
| 7 | Jay White defeated Kyle Fletcher | Singles match | 14:24 |
| 8 | Zack Sabre Jr. defeated Kazuchika Okada | Singles match | 18:59 |
| 9 | Minoru Suzuki defeated Tomohiro Ishii (c) | Singles match for the British Heavyweight Championship | 20:28 |
(c) / – the champion(s) heading into the match

== See also ==
- Professional wrestling in the United Kingdom
