= IWGP United States Heavyweight Championship =

Professional wrestling championship

- The IWGP United States Heavyweight Championship belt (2017-2023)

Details
- Promotion: New Japan Pro-Wrestling (NJPW)
- Date established: May 12, 2017
- Date retired: December 11, 2023

Other names
- IWGP United States Championship; IWGP U.S. Heavyweight Championship; IWGP United Kingdom Heavyweight Championship (2023)
Statistics
- First champion: Kenny Omega
- Final champion: Will Ospreay
- Most reigns: 3 reigns: Hiroshi Tanahashi; Juice Robinson
- Longest reign: Jon Moxley (2nd reign, 564 days)
- Shortest reign: Hiroshi Tanahashi (3rd reign, 13 days)
- Oldest champion: Hiroshi Tanahashi (45 years, 169 days)
- Youngest champion: Jay White (25 years, 110 days)
- Heaviest champion: Lance Archer (124 kg (273 lb))
- Lightest champion: Kenta (85 kg (187 lb))

The IWGP United States Heavyweight Championship (IWGP USヘビー級王座, IWGP US hebī-kyū ōza) was a professional wrestling championship owned and promoted by the New Japan Pro-Wrestling (NJPW) promotion. "IWGP" are the initials of NJPW's governing body, the International Wrestling Grand Prix (インターナショナル・レスリング・グラン・プリ, intānashonaru resuringu guran puri). The final champion was Will Ospreay, who was in his second reign at the time of the title's deactivation. On December 11, 2023, the title was replaced by the IWGP Global Heavyweight Championship.

== History ==
=== Background ===
On May 12, 2017, during the third night of the War of the Worlds tour, co-produced by New Japan Pro-Wrestling (NJPW) and Ring of Honor (ROH), NJPW United States Ambassador George Carroll announced the creation of the IWGP United States Championship. The following day, NJPW revealed the title's official name as the IWGP United States Heavyweight Championship. The title is part of an American expansion plan which NJPW had made public in the months before the announcement. Plans had been made to run extended tours in the United States with California as the base, starting in 2018. The plan was a direct response to WWE taking four wrestlers from NJPW in January 2016. Tetsuya Naito noted how the new title had the same concept as the IWGP Intercontinental Championship, which had been established during NJPW's May 2011 United States tour, promoted in conjunction with Jersey All Pro Wrestling (JAPW). NJPW chairman Naoki Sugabayashi stated that he wanted the title to be defended at future NJPW events in the United States as well as events held by ROH.

=== Belt design ===
The title belt was made red to distinguish it from the black IWGP Heavyweight Championship belt and the white IWGP Intercontinental Championship belt. It featured five plates; the American flag in the center plate with the words "UNITED STATES" imprinted over the flag, and "IWGP" imprinted on top and "CHAMPION" on the bottom. The first set of side plates also featured the American flag with the words "UNITED STATES CHAMPION" imprinted over the flags, and the second set featured half the world globe on one and the other half on the other.

During Will Ospreay's second - and what would be the title's final ever - reign, he rebranded the title as the "IWGP United Kingdom Heavyweight Championship", and debuted a custom belt that was essentially the same design and still on red leather (albeit a different shade), but with the U.S. flags replaced with Union Jack flags in the center and side plates, and replacing all the "UNITED STATES" imprinted words with "UNITED KINGDOM"; the second set of side plates retained the halves of the world globe. Despite Ospreay's claim on the new name, the title was still listed under its United States name by NJPW.

=== Inaugural championship tournament (2017) ===
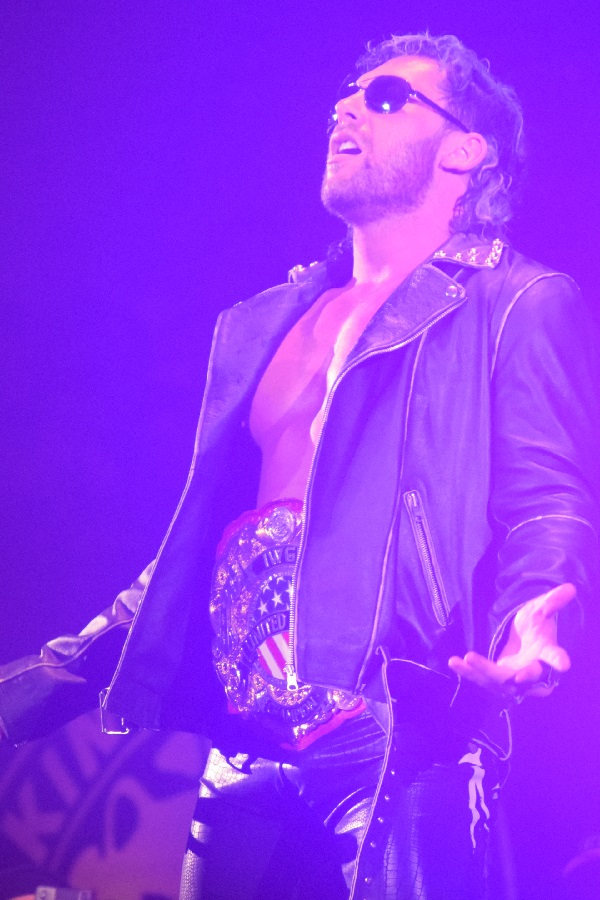
Inaugural and two-time champion Kenny Omega

The first champion would be crowned in a single-elimination tournament on the weekend of July 1 and 2, 2017, during NJPW's G1 Special in USA shows in Long Beach, California. Jay Lethal was the first participant announced for the tournament on May 12. On May 18, Hangman Page was officially added to the tournament. The other six participants as well as the bracket of the tournament, confirmed as a single-elimination tournament, were revealed on June 12. Kenny Omega went on to defeat Tomohiro Ishii in the final to become the inaugural champion.

First round (July 1)
Michael Elgin | Pin
Kenny Omega | 22:31
Jay Lethal | Pin
Hangman Page | 08:30
Juice Robinson | Sub
Zack Sabre Jr. | 10:04
Tomohiro Ishii | Pin
Tetsuya Naito | 15:51

Semifinals (July 2)
Kenny Omega | Pin
Jay Lethal | 12:56
Zack Sabre Jr. | Pin
Tomohiro Ishii | 11:42

Final (July 2)
Kenny Omega | Pin
Tomohiro Ishii | 31:20

=== Establishment ===
Since its creation, the IWGP United States Heavyweight Championship was defended in both Japan and the United States with the first Japanese defense taking place on September 24, 2017, at Destruction in Kobe and the first stateside defense taking place on October 15, 2017, at Global Wars: Chicago. After it had been announced in November 2017 that former WWE wrestler Chris Jericho would be challenging for the title at Wrestle Kingdom 12 in Tokyo Dome, Omega stated that the title had already surpassed the IWGP Intercontinental Championship as the number two championship in NJPW. However, the promotion ranked the title in the second tier, behind both the IWGP Heavyweight and Intercontinental Championships and alongside the NEVER Openweight Championship.

Throughout 2020, the COVID-19 pandemic prevented then champion Jon Moxley from traveling to Japan for NJPW events while keeping his commitments with All Elite Wrestling (AEW), with whom he is also contracted. His AEW contract also prevented him from appearing at NJPW's American events. This resulted in the championship not being defended from February 2020 to February 2021, when an arrangement was made between the two promotions to allow Moxley to appear on NJPW's American television show Strong in a title defense.

With AEW and New Japan forming a working relationship, Jon Moxley was permitted to defend the title on AEW's flagship television program, AEW Dynamite. In May 2021, the title was defended in AEW for the first time, with Moxley defeating Yuji Nagata in his fourth title defense. At July 2021's AEW Fyter Fest Night 1 event, Moxley retained the championship for his record-setting fifth defense against Impact Wrestling's Karl Anderson. The following week on Night 2 of the event, Lance Archer defeated Moxley for the championship in a Texas Death Match for his second reign.

=== Retirement ===
At the 2023 Power Struggle, after Ospreay had defended the title against Shota Umino in the main event, Bullet Club leader David Finlay destroyed both the U.S. belt and Ospreay's custom belt with a mallet after attacking Ospreay and Umino's former mentor, Jon Moxley, and a three-way match was scheduled for three men at Wrestle Kingdom 18. For the bout, although it was initially listed as for the U.S./U.K. championship, NJPW chairman Naoki Sugabayashi announced at a press conference on November 6, 2023, that a new championship would replace the U.S./U.K. championship. On December 11, 2023, this title would be named the IWGP Global Heavyweight Championship.

== Reigns ==
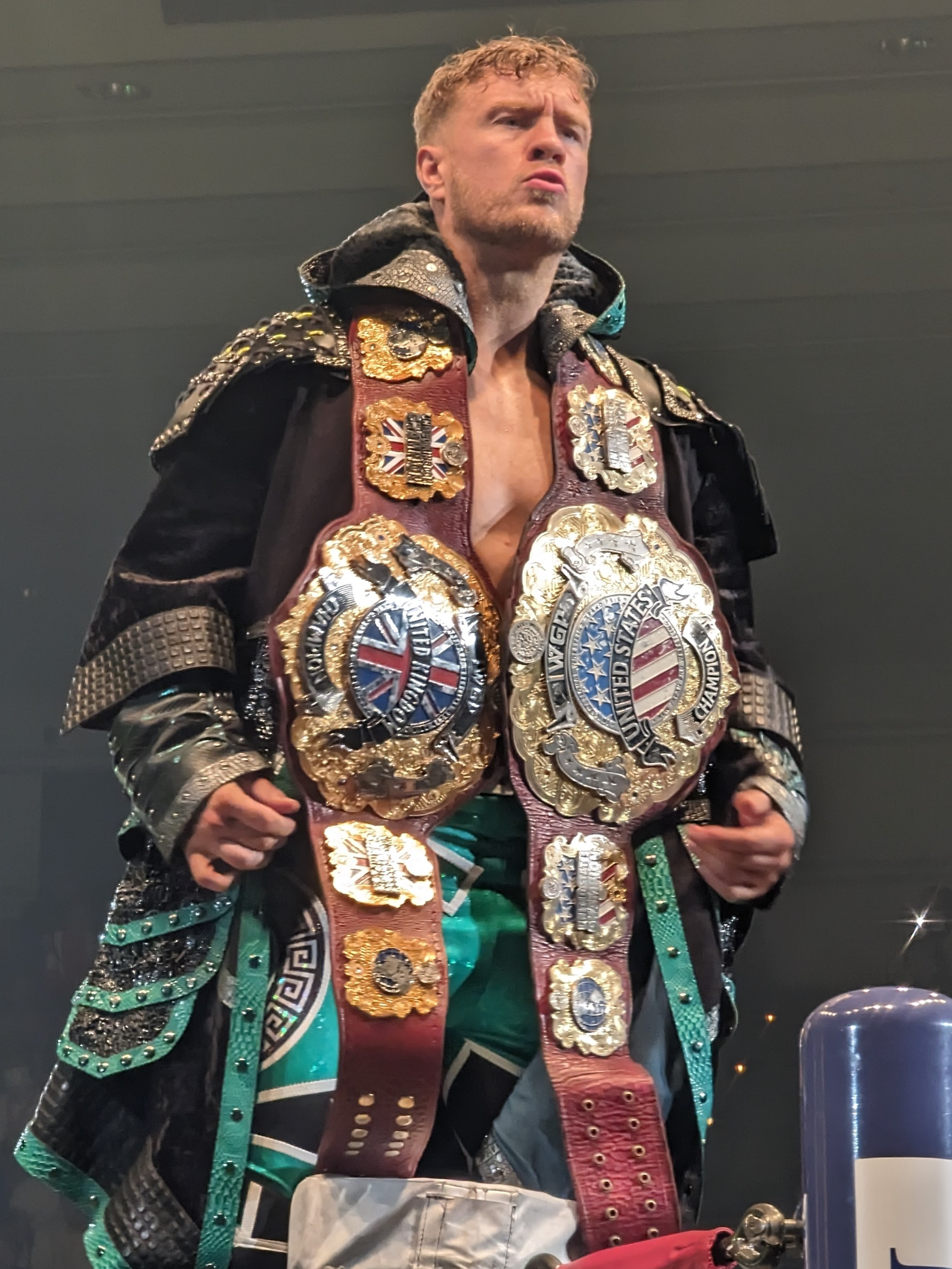
Two-time and final champion Will Ospreay, shown here with the original belt (right) and his custom-made rebranded IWGP United Kingdom Heavyweight Championship (left).

There were 18 reigns shared among 10 wrestlers with three vacancies up until the title's deactivation on December 11, 2023. Kenny Omega was the inaugural champion. Juice Robinson and Hiroshi Tanahashi were tied for the record of most reigns with three. Tanahashi also was the first Japanese wrestler to win the title, the oldest champion when he won it at 45 years old, and his third reign was the shortest at 13 days. Jay White was the youngest champion at 25 years old. Jon Moxley held two records with the title: his second reign was the longest reign at 564 days with five successful defenses, and he was the only wrestler to have held the title for a consecutive year.

Will Ospreay was the final champion in his second reign. He defeated Kenny Omega on June 25, 2023 at Forbidden Door in Toronto, Ontario, Canada.

=== Names ===
| Name | Years |
|---|---|
| IWGP United States Heavyweight Championship | May 12, 2017 – December 11, 2023 |
| IWGP United Kingdom Heavyweight Championship | August 12, 2023 – December 11, 2023 |

Key
| No. | Overall reign number |
| Reign | Reign number for the specific champion |
| Days | Number of days held |
| Defenses | Number of successful defenses |
| + | Current reign is changing daily |

| No. | Champion | Championship change | | | Reign statistics | | | Notes | Ref. |
| No. | Champion | Date | Event | Location | Reign | Days | Defenses | Notes | Ref. |
|---|---|---|---|---|---|---|---|---|---|
| 1 | Kenny Omega | July 2, 2017 | G1 Special in USA; Night 2 | Long Beach, California, U.S. | 1 | 210 | 4 | Defeated Tomohiro Ishii in the final of an eight-man single-elimination tournament to become the inaugural champion. | |
| 2 | Jay White | January 28, 2018 | The New Beginning in Sapporo | Sapporo, Japan | 1 | 160 | 3 | | |
| 3 | Juice Robinson | July 7, 2018 | G1 Special in San Francisco | Daly City, California, U.S. | 1 | 85 | 0 | | |
| 4 | Cody | September 30, 2018 | Fighting Spirit Unleashed | Long Beach, California, U.S. | 1 | 96 | 0 | | |
| 5 | Juice Robinson | January 4, 2019 | Wrestle Kingdom 13 in Tokyo Dome | Tokyo, Japan | 2 | 152 | 3 | | |
| 6 | Jon Moxley | June 5, 2019 | Best of the Super Juniors 26 Final | Tokyo, Japan | 1 | 130 | 0 | | |
| — | Vacated | October 14, 2019 | — | — | — | — | — | The championship was vacated after Jon Moxley was unable to wrestle in a scheduled championship defense at King of Pro-Wrestling due to travel issues arising from Typhoon Hagibis. | |
| 7 | Lance Archer | October 14, 2019 | King of Pro-Wrestling | Tokyo, Japan | 1 | 82 | 1 | Defeated Juice Robinson in a no disqualification match to win the vacant championship. | |
| 8 | Jon Moxley | January 4, 2020 | Wrestle Kingdom 14; Night 1 | Tokyo, Japan | 2 | 564 | 5 | This was a Texas Death Match. | |
| 9 | Lance Archer | July 21, 2021 | AEW Fyter Fest; Night 2 | Garland, Texas, U.S. | 2 | 24 | 1 | This was a Texas Death Match. | |
| 10 | Hiroshi Tanahashi | August 14, 2021 | Resurgence | Los Angeles, California, U.S. | 1 | 84 | 1 | | |
| 11 | Kenta | November 6, 2021 | Power Struggle | Osaka, Japan | 1 | 60 | 0 | | |
| 12 | Hiroshi Tanahashi | January 5, 2022 | Wrestle Kingdom 16; Night 2 | Tokyo, Japan | 2 | 45 | 0 | This was a no disqualification match. | |
| 13 | Sanada | February 19, 2022 | New Years Golden Series | Sapporo, Japan | 1 | 49 | 0 | | |
| — | Vacated | April 9, 2022 | — | — | — | — | — | The championship was vacated after Sanada suffered a fractured orbital bone. | |
| 14 | Hiroshi Tanahashi | May 1, 2022 | Wrestling Dontaku | Fukuoka, Japan | 3 | 13 | 0 | Defeated Tomohiro Ishii to win the vacant championship. | |
| 15 | Juice Robinson | May 14, 2022 | Capital Collision | Washington, D.C., U.S. | 3 | 28 | 0 | This was a fatal four-way match, also involving Jon Moxley and Will Ospreay. | |
| — | Vacated | June 11, 2022 | — | — | — | — | — | The championship was vacated after Juice Robinson was unable to wrestle in a scheduled championship defense at Dominion 6.12 in Osaka-jo Hall due to suffering from appendicitis. | |
| 16 | Will Ospreay | June 12, 2022 | Dominion 6.12 in Osaka-jo Hall | Osaka, Japan | 1 | 206 | 4 | Defeated Sanada to win the vacant championship. | |
| 17 | Kenny Omega | January 4, 2023 | Wrestle Kingdom 17 | Tokyo, Japan | 2 | 172 | 1 | | |
| 18 | Will Ospreay | June 25, 2023 | AEW x NJPW: Forbidden Door | Toronto, ON, Canada | 2 | 169 | 3 | During this reign, Ospreay rebranded the title as the IWGP United Kingdom Heavyweight Championship. | |
| — | Deactivated | December 11, 2023 | — | — | — | — | — | Replaced by the IWGP Global Heavyweight Championship. | |

== Combined reigns ==
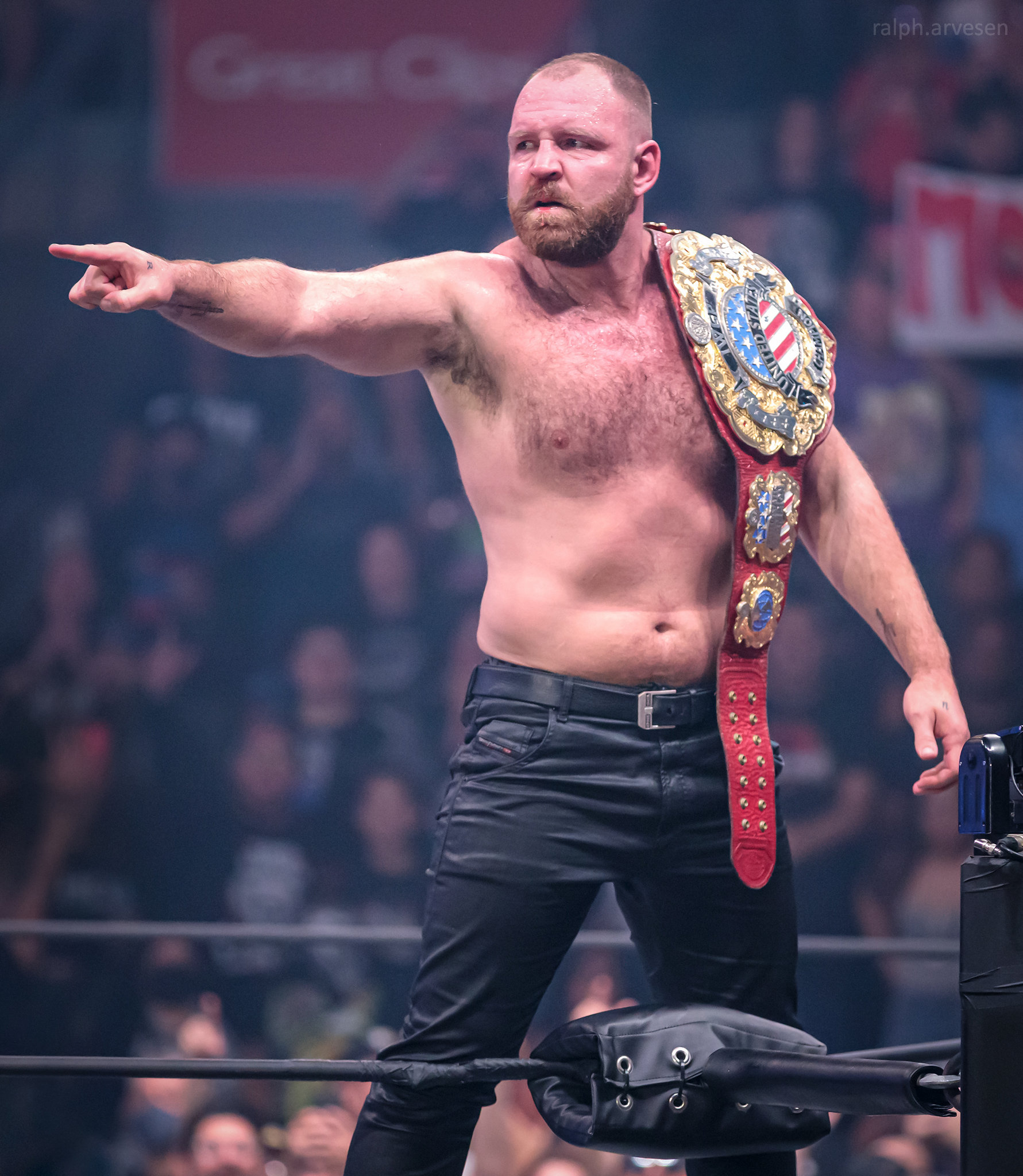
Two-time champion Jon Moxley; he has the longest singular reign for the title at 564 days, and also the longest combined reign at 694 days.

| Rank | Wrestler | No. of reigns | Combined defenses | Combined days |
|---|---|---|---|---|
| 1 | Jon Moxley | 2 | 5 | 694 |
| 2 | Kenny Omega | 2 | 5 | 382 |
| 3 | Will Ospreay | 2 | 7 | 375 |
| 4 | Juice Robinson | 3 | 3 | 265 |
| 5 | Jay White | 1 | 3 | 160 |
| 6 | Hiroshi Tanahashi | 3 | 1 | 142 |
| 7 | Lance Archer | 2 | 2 | 106 |
| 8 | Cody | 1 | 0 | 96 |
| 9 | Kenta | 1 | 0 | 60 |
| 10 | Sanada | 1 | 0 | 49 |

== See also ==
- Professional wrestling in the United States
- Professional wrestling in the United Kingdom

Sporting positions
| Preceded by IWGP Intercontinental Championship | New Japan Pro-Wrestling's secondary heavyweight championship 2021–2023 | Succeeded by IWGP Global Heavyweight Championship |
