= Strong Style Evolved =

New Japan Pro Wrestling Pay-Per-View series

- NJPW Strong Style Evolved logo
- Genre: Professional wrestling
- Countries of origin: United States; United Kingdom
- Original language: English
- No. of episodes: 3

Production
- Running time: 60 minutes
- Production company: New Japan Pro Wrestling

Original release
- Network: AXS TV; NJPW World
- Release: March 26, 2018

Related
- NJPW Strong

Strong Style Evolved is a series of professional wrestling television specials produced by New Japan Pro Wrestling (NJPW). The specials air on AXS in the United States and internationally on NJPW World. The inaugural event took place live on March 26 with the second taking place across two days in the United Kingdom on June 30 and July 1. The event will return in 2022.

== Events ==
Event	Date	City	Venue	Main Event	Ref
Strong Style Evolved (2018)	March 25, 2018	Long Beach, California	Walter Pyramid	Golden Lovers (Kenny Omega and Kota Ibushi) vs. The Young Bucks in a Tag team match	
Strong Style Evolved UK	June 30 - July 1, 2018	Milton Keynes and Altrincham	Planet Ice Arena Milton Keynes and Altrincham Ice Dome	Night 1: Suzuki-gun (Minoru Suzuki and Zack Sabre Jr.) (c) vs. Chaos (Kazuchika Okada and Tomohiro Ishii) for the Undisputed British Tag Team Championship Night 2: Minoru Suzuki vs. Tomohiro Ishii (c) for the British Heavyweight Championship	
Strong Style Evolved (2021)	March 19–26, 2021	Port Hueneme, California, USA	Oceanview Pavilion	Week 1: Brody King vs. Bateman Week 2: David Finlay and Karl Fredericks vs. Team Filthy (Tom Lawlor and Danny Limelight)	
Strong Style Evolved (2022)	March 20, 2022	St. Petersburg, Florida, USA	The Coliseum	Jay White vs. Chris Sabin	
Strong Style Evolved (2024)	December 15, 2024	Long Beach, California, USA	Walter Pyramid	Mercedes Moné (c) vs. Hazuki for the Strong Women's Championship	

== See also ==
- List of major NJPW events
