= Shota Umino =

Japanese professional wrestler (born 1997)

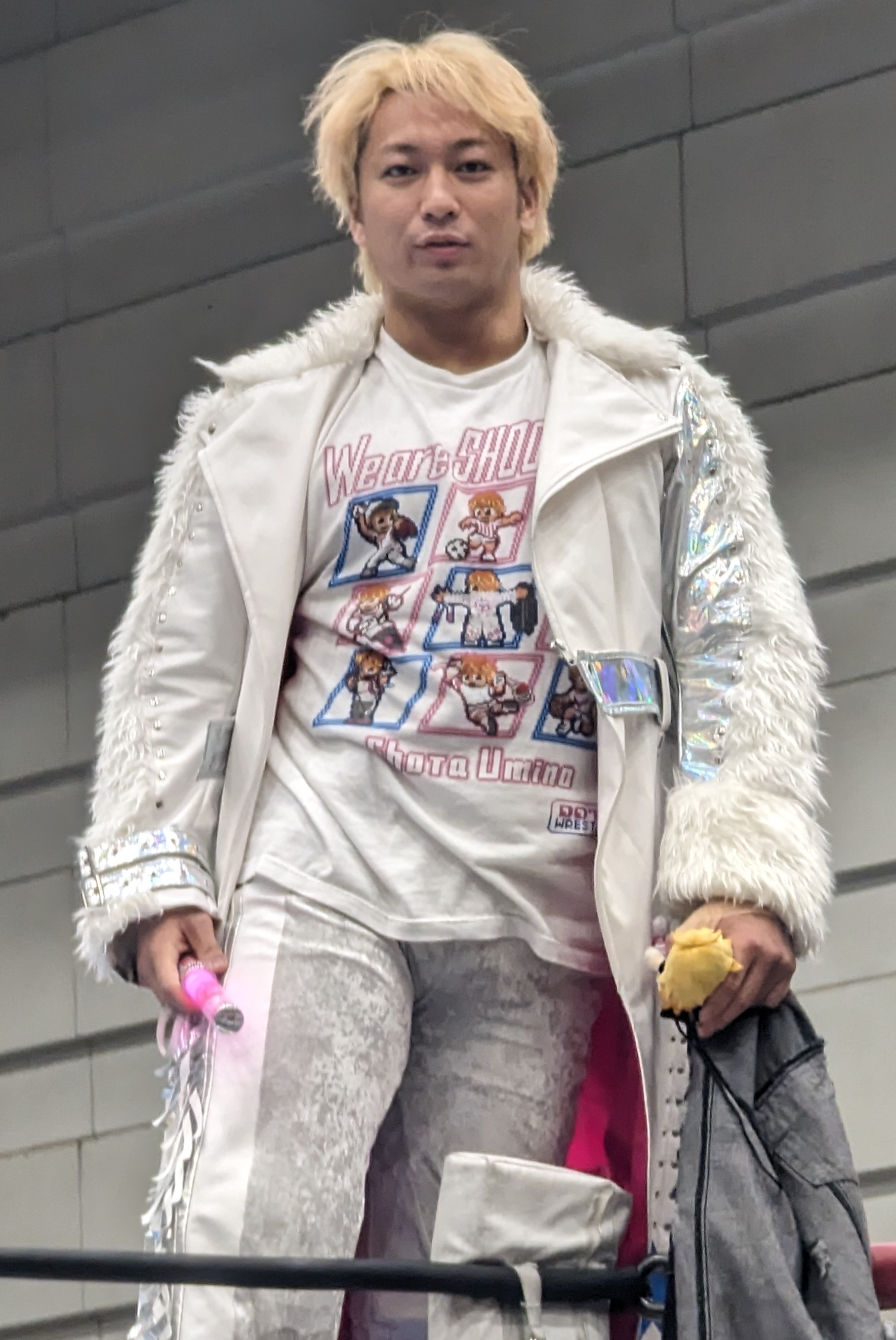
- Umino in April 2024

Personal information
- Born: Shota Umino; April 17, 1997 (age 29) Setagaya, Tokyo, Japan

Professional wrestling career
- Ring name: Shota Umino
- Billed height: 183 cm (6 ft 0 in)
- Billed weight: 93 kg (205 lb)
- Billed from: Tokyo, Japan
- Trained by: Hiroshi Tanahashi; Hiroyoshi Tenzan; Jon Moxley; Jushin Thunder Liger; NJPW Dojo; Yuji Nagata
- Debut: April 13, 2017

Shota Umino (海野 翔太, Umino Shōta; born April 17, 1997) is a Japanese professional wrestler. He is signed to New Japan Pro-Wrestling (NJPW), where he is a former one-time IWGP Global Heavyweight Champion. He has also wrestled for Revolution Pro Wrestling (RevPro) in the United Kingdom and All Elite Wrestling (AEW) in the United States.

== Early life ==
Umino was born on April 13, 1997, in the special ward of Setagaya in Tokyo, Japan. He is the son of NJPW referee Hiroyuki Umino (also known under his ring name of "Red Shoes Unno").

== Professional wrestling career ==
=== New Japan Pro-Wrestling (2017–present) ===
==== Young Lion and foreign excursion (2017–2022) ====
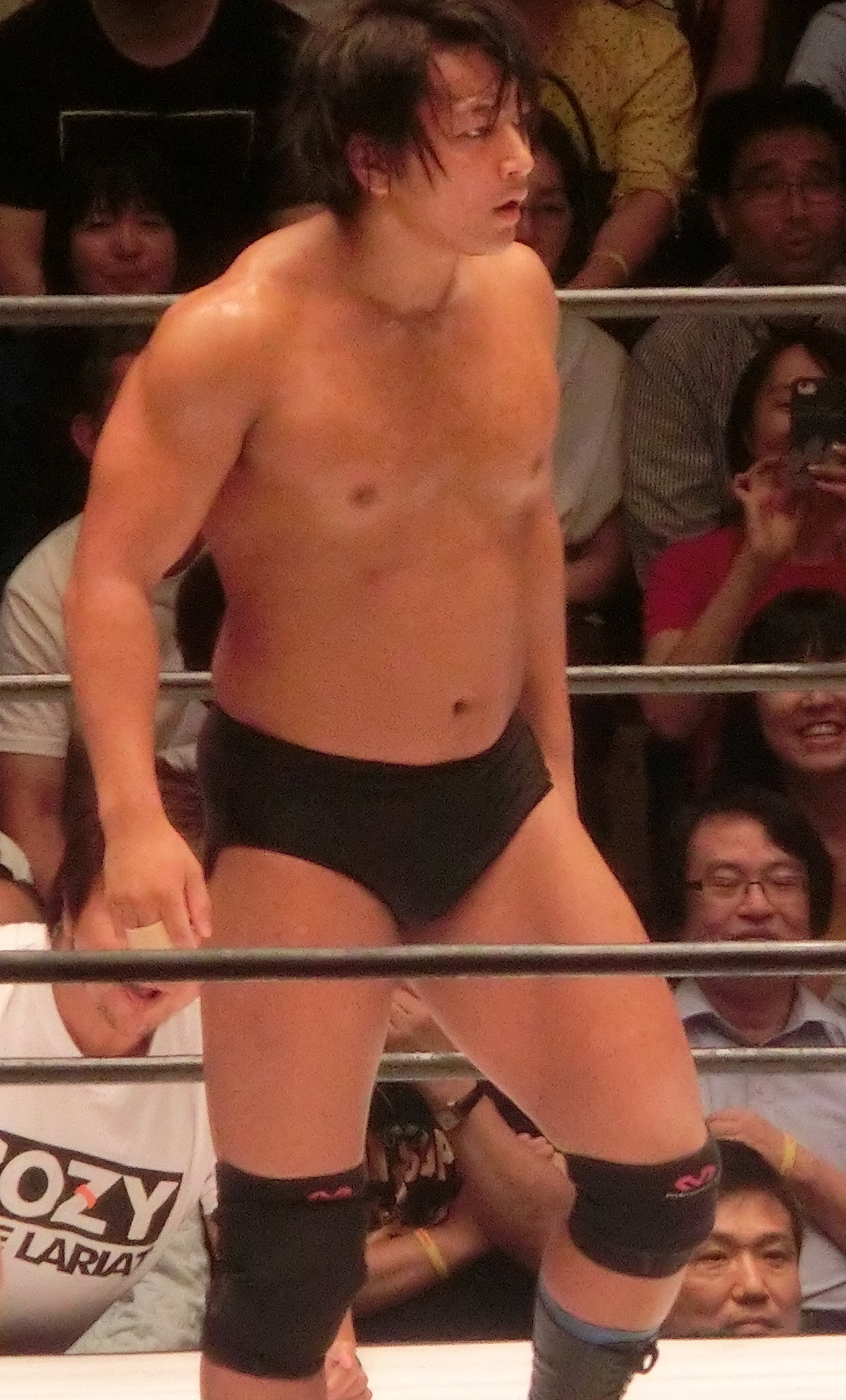
Umino in August 2018

Umino made his professional wrestling debut for New Japan Pro-Wrestling (NJPW)'s developmental territory Lion's Gate on April 13, 2017, losing to Taka Michinoku at Lion's Gate Project 4. He then made his debut for NJPW's main roster at Road to Wrestling Dontaku 2017 on April 22 as a "young lion", losing to fellow young lion Hirai Kawato. Umino obtained his first win in a six-man tag team match on the first night of the Best of the Super Juniors 24 event, teaming with Tomoyuki Oka and Volador Jr. to defeat Tetsuhiro Yagi, Katsuya Kitamura and ACH, after Oka pinned Yagi. Throughout the following months, Umino would split his time between NJPW's main roster and Lion's Gate. Umino would compete in the 2017 Young Lion Cup, but did not win, with a final standing of 4 points (two wins and three losses).

In April 2018, Umino main evented Lion's Gate Project 11, where he teamed with Yuji Nagata in a loss to Ayato Yoshida and Go Asakawa. Umino would then lose to Yoshida in a singles match in the main event of Lion's Gate Project 13 in June. Umino and Yoshida would subsequently form a tag team and competed in the 2018 World Tag League later that year, but lost all of their matches and ending with a final tally of 0 points (0 wins and 13 losses). Umino also wrestled in the 2019 New Japan Cup tournament, but lost to Hiroshi Tanahashi in the first round.

At Dominion 6.9 in Osaka-jo Hall on June 9, Umino lost to IWGP United States Champion Jon Moxley. Following the loss, Moxley would state his appreciation of Umino's efforts and adopt Umino as his tag team partner and manager for matches - dubbing him "Shooter". Their debut as a team was a loss to Jeff Cobb and Ren Narita on July 14, which they lost after Umino was pinned by Cobb. The two's partnership was halted when Moxley took a hiatus from NJPW after the end of the 2019 G1 Climax in August and began to wrestle more regularly for American promotion All Elite Wrestling (AEW).

At Royal Quest on August 31, Umino teamed with Narita and Ryusuke Taguchi in a loss to Roppongi 3K (Rocky Romero, Sho and Yoh). Umino would then move onto compete in the 2019 Young Lion Cup. Although he would lose his first tournament match to Clark Connors, Umino would win his next four matches against Narita, Michael Richards, Yuya Uemura, Alex Coughlin and Yota Tsuji, but lost the final match of the tournament to Karl Fredericks, failing to win the tournament with a final score of 10 points. Following the end of the tournament, it was announced that Umino would begin a learning excursion in the United Kingdom.

==== Return from excursion (2022–2023) ====
Umino would make his return to New Japan Pro-Wrestling, on April 16, 2022, at Windy City Riot, where he answered Jay White's open challenge but was defeated. Umino made his return to Japan as the "Roughneck" on November 5 at Battle Autumn, where he confronted and attacked Ospreay and his United Empire stablemates, challenging Ospreay for Ospreay's IWGP United States Heavyweight Championship. The match took place on November 20 at Historic X-Over, where Umino once again was defeated by Ospreay. On January 4, 2023, at Wrestle Kingdom 17, Umino teamed with Hiroshi Tanahashi and Keiji Muto to defeat Los Ingobernables de Japon (Tetsuya Naito, Bushi and Sanada), in Muto's NJPW retirement match, where Umino pinned Bushi for the win.

==== Championship pursuits (2023–present) ====
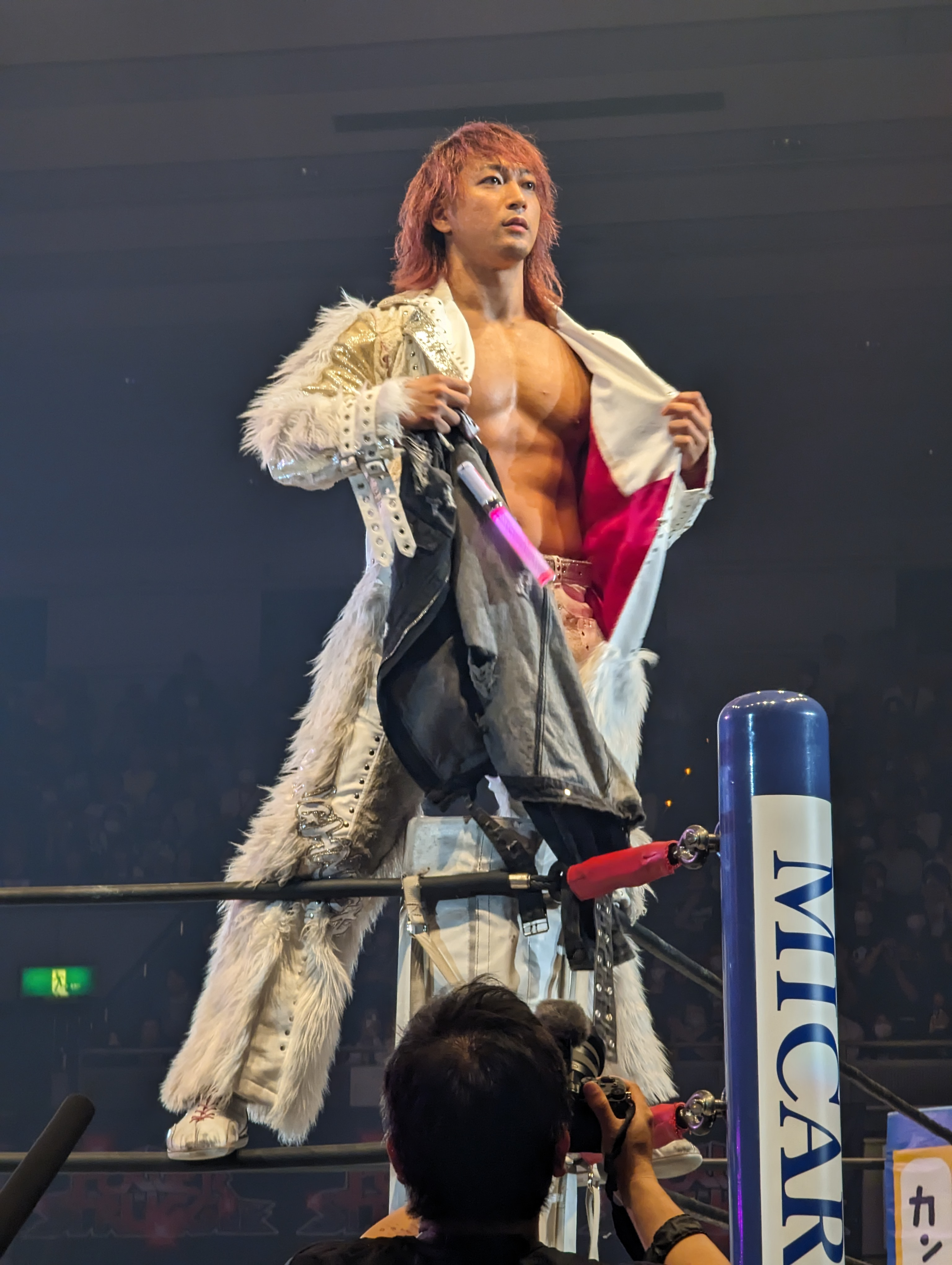
Umino in November 2023

In March, Umino participated in the New Japan Cup, being defeated in the quarterfinals by David Finlay. The second round victory over Sabre, earnt Umino a NJPW World Television Championship match at Sakura Genesis in April, where Sabre defeated Umino. On May 21 at Resurgence, Umino reunited with Jon Moxley, teaming with him and Yuta, to defeat Chaos (Kazuchika Okada, Rocky Romero and Tomohiro Ishii). He participated in his first G1 Climax tournament, where was placed in the A Block. Umino finished his tournament with 6 points, narrowly missing out on a place to advance to the quarterfinals.

In September, Umino teamed with Yuji Nagata and Master Wato to face off in a Best of Seven Series, against El Desperado, Ren Narita and Minoru Suzuki. The series culminated on October 9 at Destruction in Ryōgoku, where Umino pinned Narita in the final match to draw the series, at a record of 3–3–1. After the match, Umino shook hands with rival Narita. At Power Struggle, Ospreay defeated Umino to retain the United States title.

In November, Umino continued his alliance with Narita, with the two teaming in the annual World Tag League, with the duo participating in the A-Block. However, in their final match of the tournament, Narita turned on Umino and sided with their opponents, House of Torture. This ended their campaign with 6 points, meaning they failed to advance to the semi-finals. Umino sought his revenge heading into the new year, teaming with Kaito Kiyomiya, Ryohei Oiwa, Daiki Inaba, Shuji Kondo and Junta Miyawaki to defeat House of Torture at Noah The New Year on January 2, 2024. Two days later at Wrestle Kingdom 18, Umino teamed with Kiyomiya once more to face Narita and Evil, but failed to win the match.

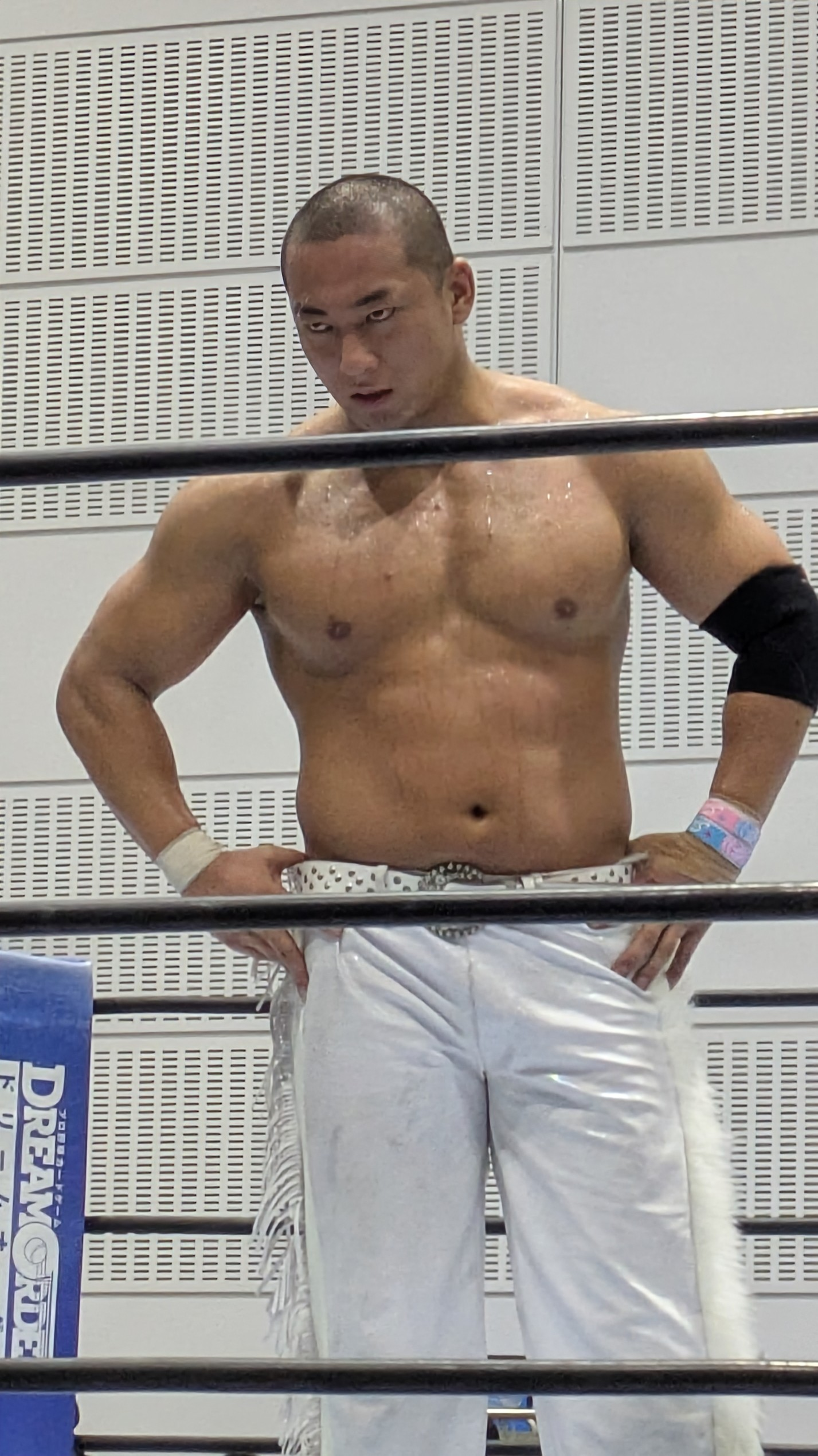
Umino in March 2025

On January 13 at Battle in the Valley, Umino teamed with Jacob Fatu and Fred Rosser to defeat Team Filthy (Tom Lawlor, Jorel Nelson and Royce Isaacs) in a six-man tag-team match. Following the match, Umino was attacked by Jack Perry, who then ripped up his contract with All Elite Wrestling. The following month, at The New Beginning in Sapporo, Umino challenged Evil for the NEVER Openweight Championship, but was unsuccessful. The following month, Umino entered the New Japan Cup, where he faced Perry in the first round. On February 6, Umino was defeated by Perry, who joined House of Torture after the match. On April 12, at Windy City Riot, he defeated Perry. After the match, they shook hands and gave respect. Umino later appeared in the show, running off Narita from attacking Moxley, who had just won the IWGP World Heavyweight Championship. At Resurgence, Umino unsuccessfully challenged Moxley for the championship. Umino participated his second G1 Climax tournament, where he was placed in A Block. Umino finished the tournament with 8 points, but failed to advance to the quarter-finals. After the tournament, Umino began receiving negative reactions from fans despite being a babyface.

On January 4, 2025 at Wrestle Kingdom 19, Umino unsuccessfully challenged Zack Sabre Jr. for the IWGP World Heavyweight Championship in the main event. On February 11 at The New Beginning in Osaka, Umino was defeated by Great-O-Khan. After the match, O-Khan attempted to shave Umino’s head, only for Umino to stop O-Khan and do it himself. In March, Umino received a first-round bye in the New Japan Cup, defeating O-Khan in a rematch in the second round, Jeff Cobb in the quarter-final, Shingo Takagi in the semi-final, but lost to David Finlay in the finals. On April 4 at Sakura Genesis, Umino defeated Hiroshi Tanahashi. After the main event, reigning IWGP World Heavyweight Champion Hirooki Goto called out Umino and challenged to a title match at Windy City Riot, which Umino accepted. On April 11 at Windy City Riot, Umino failed to win the title from Goto. From July to August, Umino competed in the G1 Climax, where he was placed in B-Block. He finished the block stage with 12 points and advanced to the quarter-finals, where he was eliminated by Yota Tsuji. In November 2025, Umino formed a tag team with Yuya Uemura and the duo entered the 2025 World Tag League, where they were placed in A-Block. The duo finished the tournament with 8 points and failed to advance to the playoff stage. In March 2026, Umino competed in the New Japan Cup, being defeated in the semifinals by Callum Newman.

On June 14, 2026 at Dominion 6.14 in Osaka-jo Hall, Umino won the IWGP Global Heavyweight Championship in a three-way match, defeating the reigning champion Andrade El Ídolo and Drilla Moloney, marking his first title in NJPW and his first title in professional wrestling. At Forbidden Door on June 28, Umino successfully defended his title against Pac. During the Road to G1 Climax tour on July 6, Umino lost the title to Gabe Kidd, ending his reign at 22 days. Umino then entered the G1 Climax as part of B Block but was forced to withdraw from the tournament on July 15 due to a concussion. Umino failed to regain the Global Heavyweight Championship from Kidd on October 12 at King of Pro-Wrestling.

=== Revolution Pro Wrestling (2019–2022) ===
Umino made his debut for Revolution Pro Wrestling (RevPro) at the New Beginnings event on November 9, 2019, in a loss to Kyle Fletcher. He had previously wrestled for RevPro in 2018, during the collaborative two-night event Strong Style Evolved UK. Umino also made his debut for Over the Top Wrestling (OTT) at the promotion's Stickin' Out event on January 5, 2020, where he lost to Scotty Davis. On January 18, Umino won RPW's 40-man Revolution Rumble battle royal. After an absence of over a year due to the COVID-19 pandemic, Umino made his return to wrestling at RevPro Live In Bristol 3 event in July 2021, defeating Dan Moloney. At RevPro's Uprising event in November, Umino challenged Will Ospreay for the Undisputed British Heavyweight Championship, but was defeated. In May of the following year, Umino challenged Michael Oku for the Undisputed British Cruiserweight Championship, but was defeated. In July, Umino unsuccessfully challenged Pac for the AEW All-Atlantic Championship.

=== All Elite Wrestling (2022–2024, 2026) ===
Due to NJPW's working relationship with All Elite Wrestling (AEW), Umino has made appearances for the promotion, making his debut in 2022, and competing at the co-promoted event Forbidden Door in 2022. 2023. and 2026 in tag matches with the Blackpool Combat Club as well as successfully defending his IWGP Global Heavyweight Championship against Pac in 2026, and competing in a Casino Gauntlet match for an AEW World Championship opportunity in 2024.

== Championships and accomplishments ==
- ESPN
  - Ranked No. 30 of the 30 Best Pro Wrestlers Under 30 in 2023
- New Japan Pro-Wrestling
  - IWGP Global Heavyweight Championship (1 time)
- Pro Wrestling Illustrated
  - Ranked No. 72 of the top 500 singles wrestlers in the PWI 500 in 2025
- Revolution Pro Wrestling
  - Revolution Rumble (2020)
