= World Wrestling Peace Festival =

Professional wrestling supercard event

- Promotional poster featuring Antonio Inoki
- Promotion(s): All Japan Women's Pro-Wrestling; Asistencia Asesoría y Administración; Consejo Mundial de Lucha Libre; Michinoku Pro Wrestling; National Wrestling Alliance; New Japan Pro-Wrestling; Pro Wrestling Fujiwara Gumi; World Championship Wrestling
- Date: June 1, 1996
- City: Los Angeles, California
- Venue: Los Angeles Memorial Sports Arena
- Attendance: 5,964
- Tagline: Harmony for Peace

Peace Festival chronology
← Previous; Collision in Korea	Next → Final

NJPW in North America chronology
← Previous; First	Next → NJPW Invasion Tour

The World Wrestling Peace Festival was a professional wrestling supercard event produced by Japanese professional wrestler Antonio Inoki, which took place on June 1, 1996, at the Los Angeles Memorial Sports Arena in Los Angeles, California. The event was organized by Inoki to promote world peace with an interpromotional event involving major promotions from around the world. Forty wrestlers from six countries ended up taking part in the event.

Inoki's home promotion New Japan Pro-Wrestling (NJPW), as well as smaller independent groups, represented Japan, while World Championship Wrestling (WCW) and the National Wrestling Alliance (NWA) took part on behalf of the United States. The World Wrestling Federation (WWF) and Extreme Championship Wrestling (ECW) were the only major promotions in North America not to participate in the show although this was not unexpected given their tense relationships with WCW during the Monday Night War. Both of Mexico's top promotions Asistencia Asesoría y Administración (AAA) and Consejo Mundial de Lucha Libre (CMLL) participated in the event, which was considered unlikely by many in the industry given their own heated rivalry.

The main attraction on the event card was a tag team match with Antonio Inoki and NWA World Heavyweight Champion Dan Severn wrestling Yoshiaki Fujiwara and Oleg Taktarov. Inoki and Severn won the match when Severn pinned Fujiwara with a keylock. One of the featured bouts on the undercard was a match between WCW World Heavyweight Champion The Giant and Sting, which The Giant won. Other matches included a "NJPW vs. Michinoku Pro" match between Jushin Thunder Liger and The Great Sasuke, a triangle match between AAA Americas Heavyweight Champion Konnan, Chris Jericho and Bam Bam Bigelow, and a tag team match pitting Perro Aguayo and La Parka against Pierroth Jr. and Cibernetico.

The event had an attendance of 5,964, far less than the 17,000 promoters were expecting, which was attributed to a poor choice of venue and lack of advertising. Though not as financially successful as Inoki's Collision in Korea show the previous year, he was widely praised for his efforts. This was the first-ever wrestling show that Inoki promoted in the United States.

The event, which also helped raise money for high school wrestling and judo programs at Los Angeles–area high schools, was supported by then Los Angeles Mayor Richard Riordan and Los Angeles County Supervisor Michael D. Antonovich. A few days before the show, Inoki was made honorary chief of police of Little Tokyo. At the show's conclusion, Inoki was also awarded a special "PWI Lifetime Achievement Award" by Pro Wrestling Illustrated (PWI) senior editor Bill Apter.

In addition, it received positive reviews from publications such as Pro Wrestling Illustrated and the Wrestling Observer Newsletter. This was supported by the internet wrestling community when it was released on DVD, albeit without matches featuring WCW wrestlers, years later. Arnold Furious of the professional wrestling section of 411mania.com rated the event a 7.0 out of 10. In his review, Kevin Wilson of PuroresuCentral.com called Inoki's Peace Festival "probably the biggest show to ever take place in America" featuring international talent and that "the majority of the matches were good and a few were near excellent".

The show is credited, along with AAA's When Worlds Collide show two years earlier, with helping introduce lucha libre style, a wrestling style that originated in Mexico in the late 19th century, to mainstream American wrestling fans. Eric Bischoff, who appeared with representatives from AAA and CMLL to open the show, later brought Rey Misterio Jr. and Chris Jericho into WCW, based on their performance in their respective matches, to compete for its cruiserweight division.

Terry Funk was scheduled to face Sabu and Brian Pillman in a three-way match, but pulled out of the show on May 8 after Pillman was sidelined following an automobile accident and Sabu was removed from the show after being booked for Big Japan Pro Wrestling (BJW) on the same date.

== Results ==
No.	Results	Stipulations	Times
1	Sgt. Craig Pittman (WCW) defeated KGB (AAA)	Singles match	6:11
2	Jim Neidhart defeated Bobby Bradley Jr.	Singles match	5:00
3	Akira Hokuto (AJW) and Lady Apache (CMLL) defeated Bull Nakano (AJW) and Neftali (AAA)	Tag team match	8:24
4	Chris Benoit (WCW) defeated Alex Wright (WCW)	Singles match	9:54
5	Rey Misterio Jr. (AAA) and Ultimo Dragon (AAA) defeated Heavy Metal (AAA) and Psicosis (AAA)	Tag team match	11:40
6	Lex Luger (WCW) defeated Masa Saito (NJPW)	Singles match	5:53
7	Negro Casas (CMLL) defeated El Hijo del Santo (CMLL)	Singles match	5:54
8	Atlantis (CMLL), Dos Caras (CMLL), and Hector Garza (CMLL) defeated Silver King (CMLL), Dr. Wagner Jr. (CMLL), and Gran Markus Jr. (CMLL)	Six-man "Lucha Libre rules" tag team match	10:35
9	Tatsumi Fujinami (NJPW) defeated Black Cat (NJPW)	Singles match	5:15
10	Perro Aguayo (AAA) and La Parka (AAA) defeated Pierroth Jr. (AAA) and Cibernetico (AAA)	Tag team match	9:38
11	Chris Jericho defeated Konnan (AAA/WCW) and Bam Bam Bigelow	Triangle match	7:31
12	Jushin Thunder Liger (NJPW) defeated The Great Sasuke (Michinoku Pro)	Singles match	12:47
13	The Giant (WCW) defeated Sting (WCW)	Singles match	5:09
14	Antonio Inoki (NJPW) and Dan Severn (NWA) defeated Yoshiaki Fujiwara (PWFG) and Oleg Taktarov	Tag team match	9:15

== See also ==
- Professional wrestling in Japan
- Professional wrestling in Mexico
- Professional wrestling in the United States
