= Tomohiro Ishii =

Japanese professional wrestler

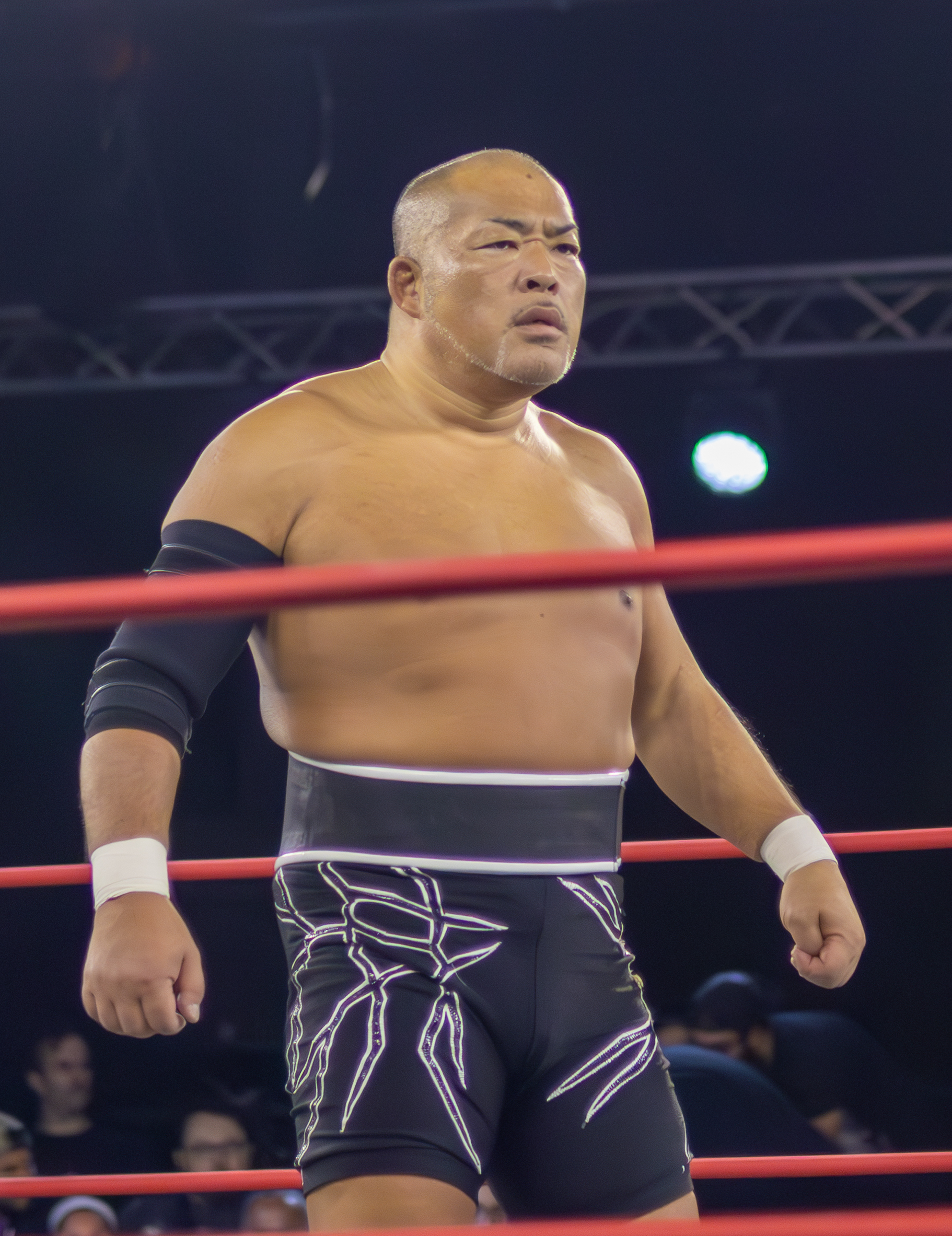
- Ishii in August 2025

Personal information
- Born: December 10, 1975 (age 50) Kawasaki, Kanagawa, Japan

Professional wrestling career
- Ring name(s): Ishii; Tomohiro Ishii
- Billed height: 1.70 m (5 ft 7 in)
- Billed weight: 100 kg (220 lb)
- Trained by: Genichiro Tenryu; Riki Choshu
- Debut: November 2, 1996

Tomohiro Ishii (石井 智宏, Ishii Tomohiro; born December 10, 1975) is a Japanese professional wrestler. He is signed to New Japan Pro-Wrestling (NJPW), where he is a founding member of the now-defunct Chaos stable. He also makes additional appearances for All Elite Wrestling (AEW), where he is a member of The Conglomeration. He is also known for his work with the independent Fighting World of Japan Pro Wrestling (Riki Pro) promotion, where he worked backstage as the chairman.

Though pushed for most of his career as an undercarder without any major championship wins, Ishii gathered a cult following, and in February 2013 was called "probably [one of the] most underrated guys in the business" by Dave Meltzer of the Wrestling Observer Newsletter. Ishii's status in NJPW finally began rising in early 2013, culminating in him winning his first title in the promotion, the NEVER Openweight Championship, in February 2014, a title he would later win a record six times. He went on to capture the IWGP Tag Team Championship on two occasions, the NEVER Openweight 6-Man Tag Team Championship three times, and the Strong Openweight Championship once.

Through NJPW's working relationship with the American Ring of Honor (ROH) and the British Revolution Pro Wrestling (RPW) promotions, he has also won the ROH World Television Championship once and is a two-time Undisputed British Heavyweight Champion.

== Professional wrestling career ==
=== Early career (1996–2005) ===
Ishii made his professional wrestling debut at the age of twenty on November 2, 1996, facing Choden Senshi Battle Ranger Z at an event held by Genichiro Tenryu's Wrestle Association "R" (WAR) promotion in Kushiro, Hokkaido. For the next years, Ishii remained affiliated with WAR, winning his first title on October 12, 1997, when he and Yuji Yasuraoka defeated Gokuaku Umibouzu and Masashi Aoyagi for the WAR International Junior Heavyweight Tag Team Championship. Ishii and Yasuraoka won the title once more on March 1, 1999, eventually becoming the final champions in the title's initial history due to Yasuraoka's retirement in June 1999 and WAR going out of business in 2000. Being forced to become a freelancer, Ishii went on to work for several promotions during the following years, including Toruymon Japan, World Entertainment Wrestling (WEW), and Fighting World of Japan Pro Wrestling (Riki Pro), which he entered as the promotion's founder Riki Choshu's apprentice, later being appointed the chairman of the promotion. In 2003, Ishii won Riki Pro's Young Magma Tournament. In 2004, Ishii also made appearances for Pro Wrestling Zero1-Max, where he and Tatsuhito Takaiwa won the NWA International Lightweight Tag Team Championship. Due to his short stature, Ishii had started his career as a junior heavyweight, but in 2005 Choshu recognized his strength and approved his transition into the heavyweight division.

=== New Japan Pro-Wrestling ===
==== Debut and various tag teams (2004–2010) ====
Ishii made sporadic appearances for New Japan Pro-Wrestling (NJPW) in 2004 and 2005, but only began working regularly for the promotion in 2006, while still representing Riki Pro. In June of that year, Ishii formed the "Heisei no Gokudo Combi" tag team with Toru Yano and together the two took part in the 2006 G1 Tag League. On October 16, Ishii and Yano joined Hiroyoshi Tenzan and Togi Makabe as the newest members of the villainous Great Bash Heel (G.B.H.) stable. From 2006 onwards, several G.B.H. members, including Ishii, Makabe and Yano, also made sporadic appearances for the Apache Pro-Wrestling Army promotion, where Ishii won the WEW Heavyweight Championship on July 12, 2008. Back in NJPW, Ishii worked as one of the lowest-ranked members of G.B.H. until April 2009, when he, along with Yano, Gedo, Giant Bernard, Jado, Karl Anderson and Takashi Iizuka turned on then-G.B.H. leader Togi Makabe and Tomoaki Honma and went on to form the new Chaos stable under the leadership of Shinsuke Nakamura. While Chaos as a unit was involved in a storyline rivalry with Makabe, Honma and Hiroyoshi Tenzan, Ishii mainly remained outside of the top matches in the rivalry, continuing to work undercard matches, starting his own rivalry with Wataru Inoue. In October 2009, Ishii received some exposure in North America, when he was featured in Total Nonstop Action Wrestling's (TNA) Global Impact 2 program on Spike TV, working in an eight-man tag team main event, where he, Giant Bernard, Karl Anderson and Takashi Iizuka were defeated by Kevin Nash, Kurt Angle, Masahiro Chono and Riki Choshu. The match had been taped during NJPW's Wrestle Kingdom III show the previous January. On January 4, 2010, Ishii was involved in another big eight-man tag team match at Wrestle Kingdom IV, where he, Takashi Iizuka, Toru Yano and Abdullah the Butcher were defeated by Manabu Nakanishi, Masahiro Chono, Riki Choshu and Terry Funk.

==== Feud with Tiger Mask (2010–2011) ====
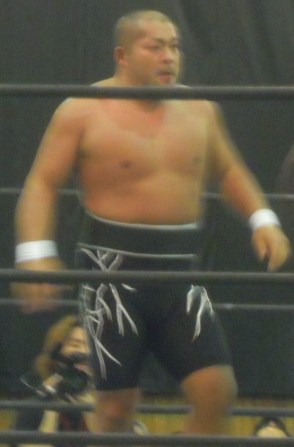
Ishii in November 2011

In late 2010, Ishii started a storyline rivalry with masked wrestler Tiger Mask, going after his mask on several occasions. This built to a match during the first Fantastica Mania weekend on January 23, 2011, where Tiger Mask defeated Ishii in a Lucha de Apuestas Mask vs. Hair match; as a result, Ishii was forced to have his head shaved. After the shaving, Ishii once again attacked his rival and unmasked him. During the next NJPW event three days later, Ishii continued his rivalry with Tiger Mask, but was now wearing the mask of Black Tiger, a longtime nemesis of the various Tiger Masks that have appeared in NJPW throughout the years. The rivalry culminated on February 20 at The New Beginning, where Tiger Mask defeated Ishii in a Mask vs. Mask match, taking away his mask and ending the rivalry. Though Ishii worked the entire rivalry under his real name, he was officially recognized by NJPW as the sixth generation Black Tiger, when Kazushige Nosawa debuted in 2012, billed as the seventh generation Black Tiger. In June 2011, Ishii took part in the J Sports Crown Openweight 6 Man Tag Tournament, where he and Chaos stablemates Takashi Iizuka and Toru Yano made it to the semifinals, before losing to Giant Bernard, Jyushin Thunder Liger and Karl Anderson.

==== NEVER Openweight Champion and critical acclaim (2012–2016) ====
After having worked for NJPW for eight years, Ishii received his first title shot in the promotion on May 20, 2012, when he unsuccessfully challenged Hirooki Goto for the IWGP Intercontinental Championship in the main event of a show in Osaka. The following November, Ishii took part in a tournament to determine the inaugural NEVER Openweight Champion. After wins over Daisuke Sasaki and Yoshi-Hashi, Ishii was defeated in the semifinals of the tournament by Chaos stablemate Masato Tanaka, who went on to win the entire tournament. The following month, Ishii teamed with Chaos leader Shinsuke Nakamura in the 2012 World Tag League, where they picked up three wins out of their six matches, failing to advance from their round-robin block. In January 2013, Ishii took part in the third Fantastica Mania weekend, winning a twelve-man torneo cibernetico on January 20. Following the win, Ishii challenged Masato Tanaka to a rematch for the NEVER Openweight Championship. The rematch between the two stablemates took place on February 3 in a main event at Korakuen Hall. Despite having the audience noticeably behind him, Ishii was again defeated by Tanaka, who, as a result, retained his title. The match was later praised by sports journalist Dave Meltzer, though he also expressed concern for the healths of both Ishii and Tanaka following the hard-hitting match. For his fan following, Ishii earned himself the nickname "New Mr. Korakuen". On March 11, Ishii picked up his biggest singles win in his NJPW career, when he defeated multi-time IWGP Heavyweight and IWGP Tag Team Champion Satoshi Kojima in the first round of the 2013 New Japan Cup. Six days later, Ishii was defeated in his second round match in the tournament by Hirooki Goto. In early 2013, Ishii also became involved in Chaos' rivalry with Suzuki-gun, NJPW's other major villainous stable, leading to Chaos and Ishii being positioned in a more sympathetic role than usual. On March 23, Ishii teamed with Jado and Shinsuke Nakamura to defeat Suzuki-gun representatives Minoru Suzuki, Lance Archer and Taka Michinoku in a six-man tag team match by pinning Michinoku for the win. After the match, Nakamura challenged Archer and his Killer Elite Squad (K.E.S.) tag team partner Davey Boy Smith Jr. to a match for the IWGP Tag Team Championship, nominating Ishii as his partner for the match. Ishii and Nakamura received their title shot on April 5, but were defeated by K.E.S. Ishii then got involved in a heated rivalry with Suzuki-gun leader Minoru Suzuki, which built to a singles match between the two on July 20 at the Kizuna Road 2013 pay-per-view, where Suzuki was victorious.

"Ishii is the ultimate example of a guy who was destined to just be a decent worker on the undercard, who garnered a cult following in Tokyo, which spread to the rest of the country and resulted in him getting a push."

— Dave Meltzer on Ishii.

As a sign of his rising status in NJPW, on August 1, Ishii entered the 2013 G1 Climax, his first ever entry into the promotion's premier tournament. Ishii main evented the second night of the tournament in Korakuen Hall, where he picked up a major win over six-time IWGP Heavyweight Champion Hiroshi Tanahashi. On the fourth night of the tournament, Ishii defeated Katsuyori Shibata. Ishii's only other win in the tournament came via forfeit over the injured Hirooki Goto, a result that left him at the bottom of block A. Following the tournament, NJPW announced that Ishii would embark on his first tour with Mexican promotion Consejo Mundial de Lucha Libre (CMLL) starting September 8. Ishii made his CMLL debut on September 13 at the 80th Anniversary Show in Mexico City, teaming with compatriots Namajague and Okumura to defeat Fuego, Rey Cometa and Stuka Jr. in a six-man tag team match. Ishii remained in CMLL until October 1, working undercard six-man tag team matches. Ishii wrestled his NJPW return match on October 14 at King of Pro-Wrestling, when he was defeated by Katsuyori Shibata in a rematch of their highly acclaimed G1 Climax match. From November 23 to December 7, Ishii and Shinsuke Nakamura took part in the 2013 World Tag League, where they finished with a record of three wins and three losses, with a loss against Togi Makabe and Tomoaki Honma on the final day costing them a spot in the semifinals.

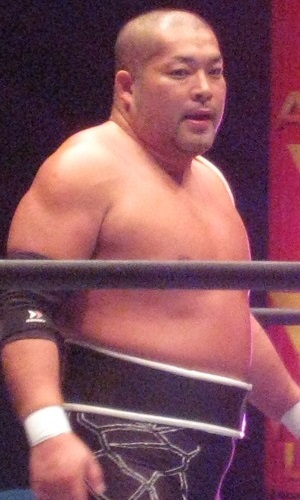
Ishii in September 2014

On January 5, 2014, Ishii started a new storyline rivalry with Tetsuya Naito, announcing his intention of becoming the next NEVER Openweight Champion. The title match between the two took place on February 11 at The New Beginning in Osaka and saw Ishii become the third NEVER Openweight Champion, winning his first title in NJPW. After Naito eliminated Ishii from the 2014 New Japan Cup in their first round match, a rematch for the NEVER Openweight Championship between the two was set for the April 6 Invasion Attack 2014 event, where Ishii made his first successful title defense. Ishii's second successful title defense took place just six days later during NJPW's trip to Taiwan, when he defeated Kushida. On May 3 at Wrestling Dontaku 2014, Ishii made his third successful title defense against Tomoaki Honma and was afterwards challenged by IWGP Junior Heavyweight Champion Kota Ibushi, with whom he had had sporadic heated encounters since the past year's G1 Climax. The match between the two took place on May 25 at Back to the Yokohama Arena and saw Ishii make his fourth successful title defense. After the match, Ishii was pulled into the rivalry between Chaos and Bullet Club, when he was attacked by former stablemate Yujiro Takahashi, who appointed himself as his next challenger. On June 29, Ishii lost the NEVER Openweight Championship to Takahashi in his fifth defense, following outside interference from Bullet Club. From July 21 to August 8, Ishii took part in the 2014 G1 Climax, where he finished tied fifth in his block with a record of five wins and five losses, working his two final matches with a separated shoulder. Ishii's performance in the tournament was praised, with Mike Sempervive of Wrestling Observer Newsletter stating that the quality of his matches, his fortitude, popularity and charisma secured him as a "legitimate New Japan star".

On October 13 at King of Pro-Wrestling, Ishii regained the NEVER Openweight Championship from Yujiro Takahashi, becoming the first two-time holder of the title. Ishii made his first successful title defense on November 8 at Power Struggle against Hirooki Goto. From November 23 to December 5, Ishii took part in the 2014 World Tag League, alongside Shinsuke Nakamura. The team finished second in their block with a record of four wins and three losses, narrowly missing the finals of the tournament due to losing to Hirooki Goto and Katsuyori Shibata on the final day. On January 4, 2015, at Wrestle Kingdom, Ishii lost the NEVER Openweight Championship to Togi Makabe in his second defense. On February 14 at The New Beginning in Sendai, Ishii defeated Tomoaki Honma, a late replacement for an ill Togi Makabe, to win the now vacant NEVER Openweight Championship for the third time. Ishii once again lost the title to Makabe in his first defense on April 29 at Wrestling Hinokuni. The two faced off in another title match on July 5 at Dominion 7.5 in Osaka-jo Hall, where Makabe was once again victorious. From July 23 to August 15, Ishii took part in the 2015 G1 Climax, where he finished in the middle of his block with a record of five wins and four losses. On October 12 at King of Pro-Wrestling, Ishii defeated Makabe to win the NEVER Openweight Championship for the fourth time. Ishii made his first successful title defense on November 7 at Power Struggle against Tomoaki Honma. Ishii's reign ended in his next defense, when he was defeated by Katsuyori Shibata on January 4, 2016, at Wrestle Kingdom. Ishii received a rematch for the title on February 11 at The New Beginning in Osaka, but was again defeated by Shibata.

==== Championship reigns (2016–present) ====
On February 19, Ishii took part in the NJPW and Ring of Honor (ROH) co-produced Honor Rising: Japan 2016 event, defeating Roderick Strong for the ROH World Television Championship in the main event. A week later, Ishii made his debut for ROH at their 14th Anniversary Show, successfully defending his title in a three-way match against Strong and Bobby Fish. At the following day's Ring of Honor Wrestling tapings, Ishii successfully defended the title against Cedric Alexander to return to Japan as the reigning champion.

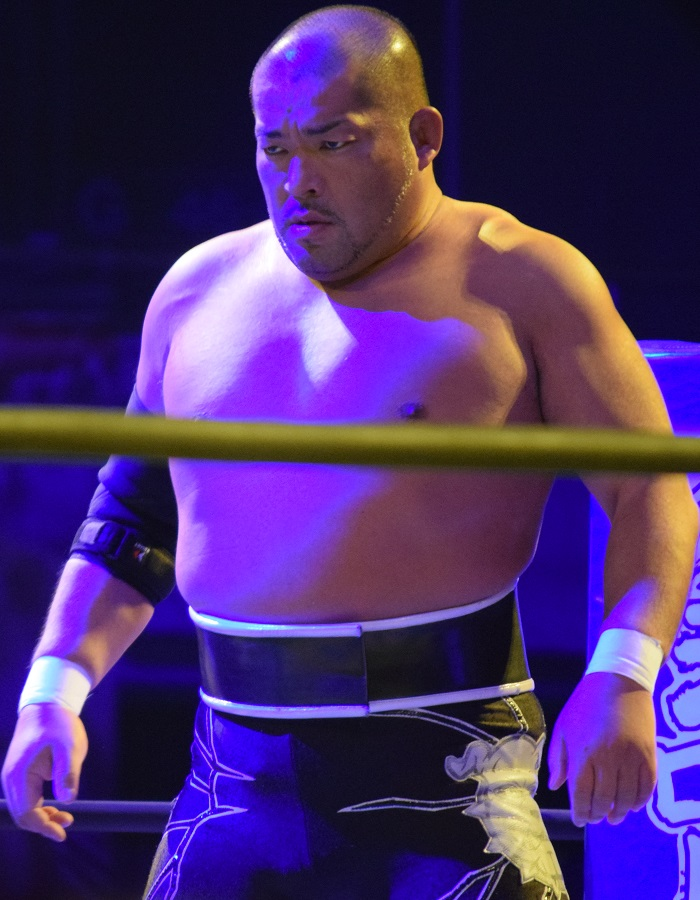
Ishii in February 2016

In early 2016, Chaos entered a rivalry with the Los Ingobernables de Japón (L.I.J.) stable. During March's New Japan Cup, Ishii faced two L.I.J. members, defeating Evil in the first round and then losing to the stable's leader Tetsuya Naito in the quarterfinals, after which he was attacked by Evil. This led to a match on March 20, where Ishii made his third successful defense of the ROH World Television Championship against Evil. When Naito, after winning the 2016 New Japan Cup, defeated Ishii's Chaos stablemate Kazuchika Okada to win the IWGP Heavyweight Championship, Ishii confronted the new champion, which led to NJPW granting him his first-ever shot at the promotion's top title. Ishii received his title shot on May 3 at Wrestling Dontaku 2016, but was defeated by Naito. Five days later, Ishii lost the ROH World Television Championship to Bobby Fish at the NJPW and ROH co-produced Global Wars show. From July 18 to August 12, Ishii took part in the 2016 G1 Climax, where he finished with a record of four wins and five losses. One of Ishii's wins was over Chaos stablemate and reigning IWGP Heavyweight Champion Kazuchika Okada. At the end of the year, Ishii took part in the 2016 World Tag League, teaming with Chaos stablemate Hirooki Goto. The two finished the tournament with a record of four wins and three losses, failing to advance to the finals due to losing to block winners Great Bash Heel (Togi Makabe and Tomoaki Honma) in their final round-robin match.

On January 4, 2017, at Wrestle Kingdom 11, Ishii and Toru Yano defeated G.B.H. and Guerrillas of Destiny (Tama Tonga and Tanga Loa) in a three-way match to become the new IWGP Tag Team Champions. Ishii and Yano made their first successful title defense on February 5 at The New Beginning in Sapporo in a three-way match against G.B.H. and K.E.S. Six days later at The New Beginning in Osaka, Ishii and Yano successfully defended the title in another three-way match against G.B.H. and the team of Davey Boy Smith Jr. and Takashi Iizuka. They lost the title to Tencozy (Hiroyoshi Tenzan and Satoshi Kojima) on March 6 at NJPW's 45th anniversary event. Later that month, Ishii made it to the semifinals of the 2017 New Japan Cup, before losing to Katsuyori Shibata. Over the weekend of July 1 and 2 at G1 Special in USA, Ishii took part in an eight-man tournament to crown the inaugural IWGP United States Heavyweight Champion, making it to the finals, before losing to Kenny Omega. Later that month, Ishii entered the 2017 G1 Climax, where he finished with a record of four wins and five losses. Following the conclusion of the G1 Climax, the tournament's winner Tetsuya Naito nominated Ishii as his first challenger for his contract for an IWGP Heavyweight Championship match at Wrestle Kingdom 12 due to Ishii's wins over him during both the United States Heavyweight Championship tournament and the G1 Climax. On October 9 at King of Pro-Wrestling, Ishii unsuccessfully challenged Naito for his contract.

On January 4, 2018, at Wrestle Kingdom 12, Ishii, Beretta and Toru Yano won a five-team gauntlet match to become the new NEVER Openweight 6-Man Tag Team Champions. In March, Ishii participated in the New Japan Cup, but was defeated by Michael Elgin in the first round. On April 6, 2018, at WrestleCon, Ishii defeated Zack Sabre Jr. to win the RevPro British Heavyweight Championship. On July 1, 2018, during the Strong Style Evolved UK tour, he would lose the title to Minoru Suzuki. Later that July, Ishii entered the 2018 G1 Climax, where he was sorted into the B block. Ishii placed fifth in the block, with a record of five wins and four losses, and scored victories over NEVER Openweight Champion Hirooki Goto, IWGP United States Champion Juice Robinson, and IWGP Heavyweight Champion Kenny Omega. The last of these victories set up Ishii to challenge Omega for the IWGP Heavyweight Championship at Destruction in Hiroshima in September, which Ishii lost. On October 14, Ishii won back the RPW British Heavyweight Championship in a rematch with Suzuki. Ishii also won a rematch with Suzuki the following month at Power Struggle. For the 2018 World Tag League, Ishii teamed with Yano for the second straight year, and they tied for third place with nine wins and four losses.

On January 4, 2019, at Wrestle Kingdom 13, Ishii lost the British Heavyweight Championship to Zack Sabre Jr. In March, Ishii once again entered the New Japan Cup and made it to the semifinals before losing to eventual tournament winner Kazuchika Okada. At the G1 Supercard the following month, Ishii entered the pre-show Honor Rumble, a 30-man battle royale for a ROH World Championship title match, which was ultimately won by Kenny King. On the second night of Wrestling Dontaku 2019, Ishii defeated Evil in a headlining singles match. After the victory, Taichi, who had won the NEVER Openweight Championship the previous night, handpicked Ishii as his first challenger for the title. On June 9, at Dominion 6.9 in Osaka-jo Hall, Ishii defeated Taichi to win the NEVER Openweight Championship for a record fifth time. In the 2019 G1 Climax, Ishii competed in the B block, where he finished with a record of eight points (four wins and five losses). On August 31, at Royal Quest, Ishii lost the NEVER Openweight Championship to Kenta. A month later, at Destruction in Beppu, Ishii teamed with fellow Chaos stablemate Yoshi-Hashi to unsuccessfully face the Guerrillas of Destiny for the IWGP Tag Team Championship. In the 2019 World Tag League, Ishii and Yoshi-Hashi finished with twenty-two points in the block, behind Guerrillas of Destiny (who they defeated on the final day), Los Ingobernables de Japón (Evil and Sanada) and FinJuice (David Finlay and Juice Robinson).

On January 5, 2020, during the second night of Wrestle Kingdom 14, Ishii unsuccessfully competed in a four-team gauntlet match for the NEVER Openweight 6-Man Tag Team Championship with Yoshi-Hashi and Robbie Eagles. In June 2020, Ishii competed in the 2020 New Japan Cup, but was eliminated by Hiromu Takahashi in the quarter-finals. On August 9, on the Summer Struggle tour, Ishii, Goto and Yoshi-Hashi won a tournament for the vacant NEVER Openweight 6-Man Tag Team Championship over Kazuchika Okada, Sho and Toru Yano in the finals, marking Ishii's second reign with the championship. On September 11, during the New Japan Road tour, their first defense of the title came in a rematch between both Chaos teams, with Ishii hitting the finish on Sho. In the long-delayed 2020 G1 Climax, Ishii competed in the A block, where he finished with a record of eight points (four wins and five losses). In the 2020 World Tag League, Ishii was partnered with Toru Yano, where they finished with ten points in the block, failing to advance to the finals.

On January 6, 2021, at New Year Dash!!, Chaos defeated Bullet Club in a six-man tag team match, with Ishii pinning Jay White, who had failed to win the IWGP Heavyweight Championship and IWGP Intercontinental Championship the previous night. On the Road to the New Beginning tour, Chaos and Bullet Club would be involved in six-man tag team matches, and on February 1, White returned to the company, attacking Ishii. The next day, Bullet Club defeated Chaos in a ten-man elimination match, resulting in White and the Guerrillas of Destiny challenging Ishii, Goto and Yoshi-Hashi for the NEVER Openweight 6-Man Tag Team Championship. On February 10, at The New Beginning in Hiroshima, Ishii, Goto and Yoshi-Hashi retained the title over White and the Guerrillas of Destiny. However, the feud between Ishii and White continued, and culminated at Castle Attack, with White defeating Ishii. In March, Ishii participated in the New Japan Cup, but was defeated by Sanada in the first round. Afterwards, Ishii returned to the six-man title picture during the spring and summer tours, where Chaos retained over trios representing Bullet Club, Los Ingobernables de Japón and Suzuki-gun, as well as the veteran pairing of Tencozy and Yuji Nagata. In the 2021 G1 Climax, Ishii competed in the A block for the second successive year, and finished with a record of ten points (four wins and four losses). On October 21, at the G1 Climax finals, Ishii, Goto and Yoshi-Hashi were defeated in a trios match by Bullet Club sub-group House of Torture (which also included former Chaos member Sho). On November 6, at Power Struggle, Evil, Sho and Yujiro Takahashi defeated Ishii, Goto and Yoshi-Hashi, ending their reign at 454 days. On November 13, at Battle in the Valley, Ishii defeated White for the NEVER Openweight Championship, with the stipulation being that if Ishii lost he would be unable to challenge for the title.

On January 4, 2022, during the first night of Wrestle Kingdom 16, Ishii was defeated by Evil, ending his reign at 52 days. On February 13, during the New Years Golden Series tour, he was defeated by Evil in the rematch for the NEVER Openweight Championship, with members of Chaos and House of Torture acting as lumberjacks. In March, Ishii participated in the New Japan Cup, but was defeated by Shingo Takagi in the first round. Ishii was announced as a part of the NJPW bracket to qualify for a chance to advance to Forbidden Door to compete in a four-way match for the inaugural AEW All-Atlantic Championship. He defeated Yoshinobu Kanemaru in the first qualifier and Clark Connors in the final qualifier, to qualify for the match at the PPV. However, it was later reported that Ishii had suffered a left knee injury and was not medically cleared to compete at Forbidden Door, therefore Connors took his place in the four-way match, but failed to win.

On June 12 during Dominion 6.12 in Osaka-jo Hall, Ishii was announced as a participant in the G1 Climax 32 tournament starting in July, as a part of the B block. Ishii finished the tournament with 4 points and failed to advance to the semi-finals. In October, Ishii participated in a tournament to crown the first ever NJPW World Television Champion. In the first round, however, Ishii was defeated by returning young lion Ren Narita in an upset loss. On January 4 at Wrestle Kingdom 17, Ishii entered the New Japan Rambo, but failed to last till the final 4.

In February at The New Beginning in Sapporo, Ishii faced Zack Sabre Jr for the NJPW World Television Championship but was defeated. The following month, Ishii entered the New Japan Cup, but lost to David Finlay in the first round. On April 15 at Capital Collision, Ishii defeated El Desperado. The following day, Ishii teamed with Lio Rush to challenge Aussie Open (Mark Davis and Kyle Fletcher) for the Strong Openweight Tag Team Championships, but the duo were defeated. In May at Wrestling Dontaku, Ishii teamed with Kazuchika Okada and Hiroshi Tanahashi, to defeat Minoru Suzuki, El Desperado and Ren Narita for the NEVER Openweight 6-Man Tag Team Championship. The following month at Dominion 6.4 in Osaka-jo Hall, the trio defeated AEW's Blackpool Combat Club (Jon Moxley and Claudio Castagnoli) and Shota Umino, therefore retaining their titles. From July 16 to August 9, Ishii took part in the 2023 G1 Climax, where he finished the tournament with a record of two wins and five losses, failing to advance to the quarterfinals of the tournament. From November 25 until December 6, Ishii and Toru Yano took part in the 2023 World Tag League, finishing the tournament with a record of four wins, and three losses, failing to advance to the semifinals of the tournament On January 24, 2024, after successfully defending the NEVER Openweight 6-Man Tag Team Championship against TMDK (Kosei Fujita, Mikey Nicholls, Shane Haste), Okada decided to vacate the titles, due to him leaving NJPW, ending their reign at 266 days.

On April 11, 2025 at Windy City Riot, Ishii defeated Gabe Kidd in a 30-minute Iron Man match in sudden death overtime 2-1 to win the Strong Openweight Championship for the first time. At Dominion 6.15 in Osaka-jo Hall, Ishii and Taichi won the IWGP Tag Team Championship for the second time from Callum Newman and Great-O-Khan. At Destruction in Kobe, Ishii and Taichi lost their titles to Knock Out Brothers (Yuto-Ice and Oskar), ending their reign at 105 days.

On February 27, 2026 at The New Beginning USA, Ishii lost the Strong Openweight Championshio to Boltin Oleg, ending his reign at 322 days. In March 2026, it was announced Ishii would be taking time off to heal from a neck injury and withdrew from the New Japan Cup.

=== All Elite Wrestling (2021–present) ===
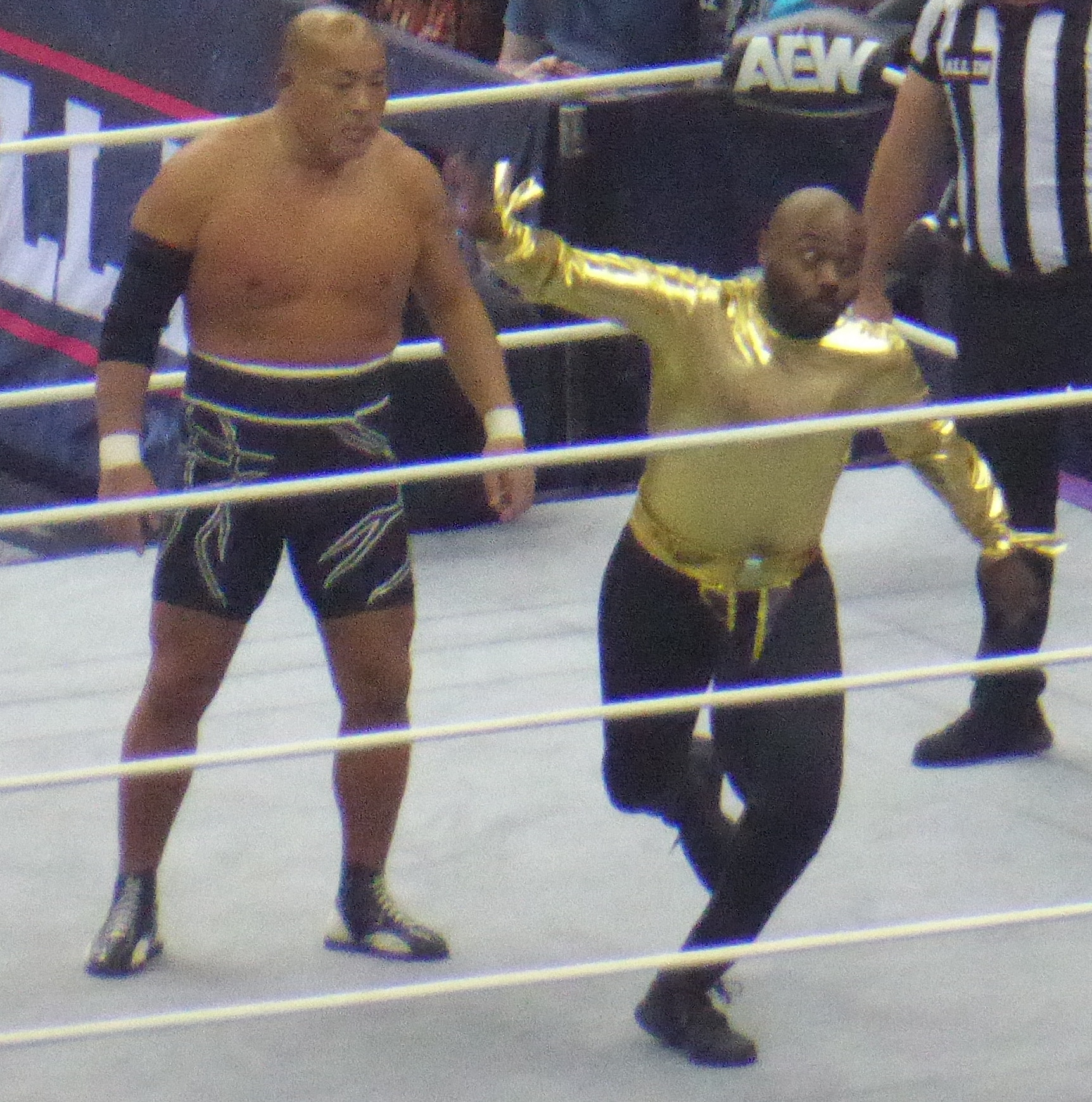
Ishii (left) wrestling Stokely Hathaway at All In in August 2024

Since November 2021, Ishii had made appearances on All Elite Wrestling (AEW). He made his debut On the November 17 episode of Dynamite, where he and Orange Cassidy, defeated The Butcher and the Blade. During the following years, he competed in the inaugural Owen Hart Cup in 2022, and would challenge Chris Jericho for the ROH World Championship in 2022 and 2024, but failed to win the title. In 2024, Ishii joined The Conglomeration stable and wrestled at All In at Wembley Stadium in August, teaming with stablemate Willow Nightingale to defeat Kris Statlander and Stokely Hathaway.

== Other media ==
In 2016, Ishii starred in the music video for "Darling" by May's, the same artist that produced his ring theme song, "Stone Pitbull".

== Championships and accomplishments ==
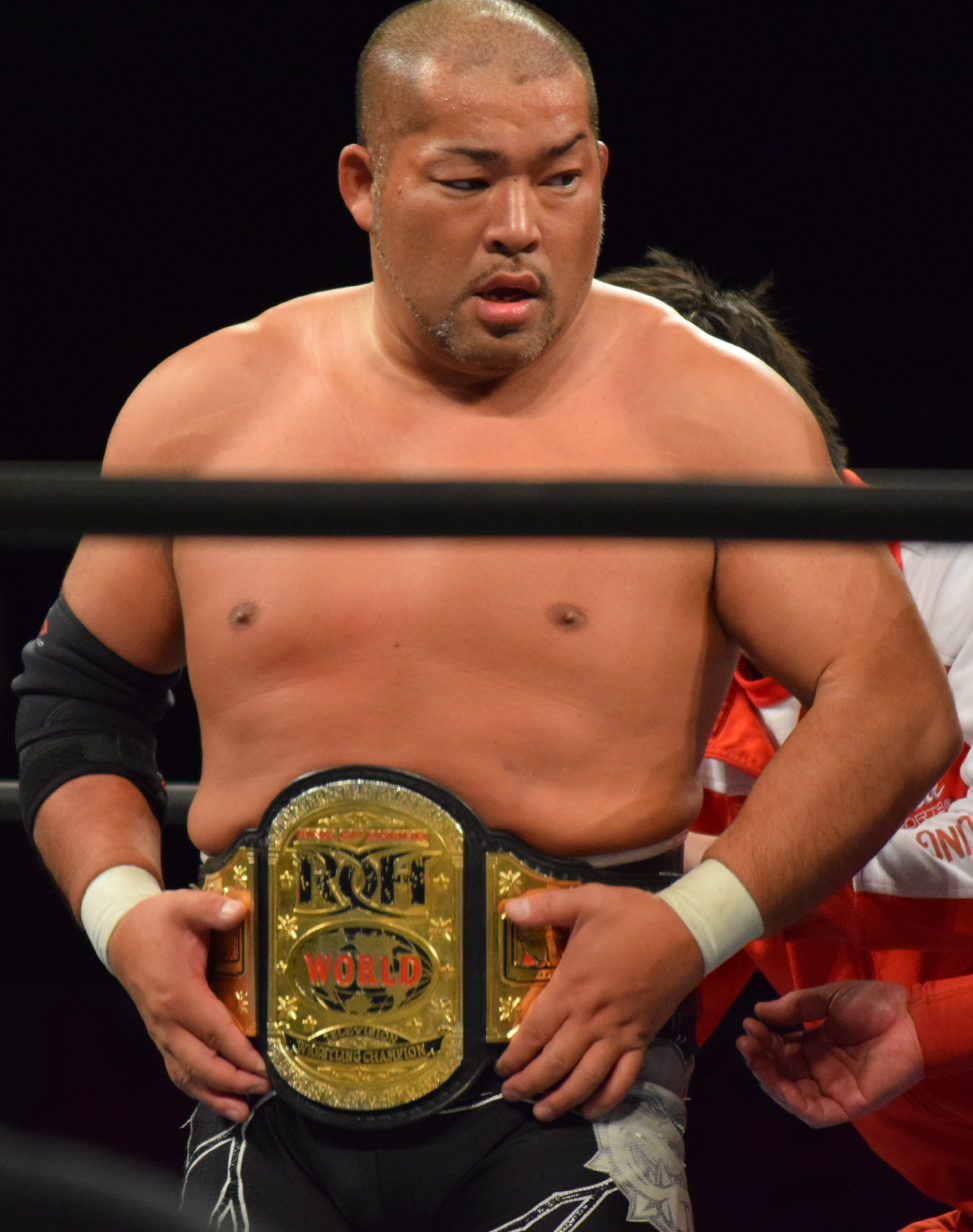
Ishii as the ROH World Television Champion

- Apache Pro-Wrestling Army
  - WEW Heavyweight Championship (1 time)
- Fighting World of Japan Pro Wrestling
  - Young Magma Tournament (2003)
- New Japan Pro-Wrestling
  - IWGP Tag Team Championship (2 times) – with Toru Yano (1) and Taichi (1)
  - NEVER Openweight Championship (6 times)
  - Strong Openweight Championship (1 time)
  - NEVER Openweight 6-Man Tag Team Championship (3 times) – with Beretta and Toru Yano (1), Hirooki Goto and Yoshi-Hashi (1) and Hiroshi Tanahashi and Kazuchika Okada (1)
  - NEVER Openweight Six Man Tag Team Title Tournament (2020) – with Hirooki Goto and Yoshi-Hashi
- Pro Wrestling Illustrated
  - Ranked No. 37 of the top 500 singles wrestlers in the PWI 500 in 2016
- Pro Wrestling Zero1-Max
  - NWA International Lightweight Tag Team Championship (1 time) – with Tatsuhito Takaiwa
- Revolution Pro Wrestling
  - British Heavyweight Championship (2 times)
- Ring of Honor
  - ROH World Television Championship (1 time)
- SoCal Uncensored
  - Match of the Year (2017) vs. Kenny Omega (NJPW, July 2)
- Tenryu Project
  - Tenryu Project Six-Man Tag Team Championship (2 times) – with Arashi and Suwama (1), and Arashi and Genichiro Tenryu (1)
- Tokyo Sports
  - Outstanding Performance Award (2014)
- Wrestle Association "R"
  - WAR International Junior Heavyweight Tag Team Championship (2 times) – with Yuji Yasuraoka
- Wrestling Observer Newsletter
  - Best Brawler (2014–2019)
  - Best Brawler of the Decade (2010s)
  - Wrestling Observer Newsletter Hall of Fame (2023)

== Luchas de Apuestas record ==
Winner (wager)	Loser (wager)	Location	Event	Date	Notes
Tiger Mask (mask)	Tomohiro Ishii (hair)	Tokyo	Fantastica Mania	January 23, 2011	
