= RevPro Uprising 2025 =

2025 RevPro professional wrestling event

Uprising 2025
- Official poster of the event
- Promotion: Revolution Pro Wrestling
- Date: 16 December 2025
- City: Cardiff, Wales
- Venue: Vale Arena

Uprising chronology
← Previous; 2024	Next → —

The 2025 Uprising was the thirteenth Uprising professional wrestling supershow promoted by the British wrestling promotion Revolution Pro Wrestling (RevPro). The event also featured wrestlers from All Elite Wrestling (AEW). The event took place on 16 December 2025, at the Vale Arena in Cardiff, Wales.

== Production ==
=== Storylines ===
The event includes matches that each resulted from scripted storylines, where wrestlers portrayed heroes, villains, or less distinguishable characters in scripted events that built tension and culminated in a wrestling match or series of matches.

=== Event ===
The event started with the six-man tag team confrontation in which the team of Josh Holly, Shane Hook and Tommy Vril picked up a victory over David Francisco, Joshua James and Kelly Sixx. Next up, 1 Called Manders defeated Ricky Knight Jr. in singles competition. The third bout saw Joe Lando outmatching Danny Black, Leon Cage, Lio Rush, Robbie X and Will Kaven in a six-way scramble to retain the Undisputed British Cruiserweight Championship. Next up, Alex Windsor defeated Anita Vaughan by disqualification in singles competition. The fifth match saw Mark Davis defeat Trent Seven in another singles bout. Next up, Ethan Allen and Luke Jacobs defeated Brendan White and Danny Jones to retain the Undisputed British Tag Team Championship. In the seventh bout, Ricochet defeated Nino Bryant to retain the AEW National Championship. Next up, Michael Oku defeated Connor Mills in singles competition. In the semi main event, Mercedes Moné defeated Rhio to retain the DW Women's Championship, the EWA Women's Championship, and the Undisputed British Women's Championship

In the main event, Jay Joshua defeated Sha Samuels to win the Undisputed British Heavyweight Championship.

== Results ==
No.	Results	Stipulations	Times
1	Josh Holly, Shane Hook and Tommy Vril defeated The New Sons Of Southampton (David Francisco, Joshua James and Kelly Sixx) by pinfall	Six-man tag team match	6:10
2	1 Called Manders defeated Ricky Knight Jr. by pinfall	Singles match	7:15
3	Joe Lando (c) defeated Danny Black, Leon Cage, Lio Rush, Robbie X and Will Kaven by pinfall	Six-way scramble for the Undisputed British Cruiserweight Championship	14:40
4	Alex Windsor defeated Anita Vaughan (with Safire Reed) by disqualification	Singles match	9:06
5	Mark Davis defeated Trent Seven by pinfall	Singles match	15:40
6	The Young Guns (Ethan Allen and Luke Jacobs) (c) defeated Greedy Souls (Brendan White and Danny Jones) by pinfall	Tag team match for the Undisputed British Tag Team Championship	12:54
7	Ricochet (c) defeated Nino Bryant (with Leland Bryant and Zander Bryant) by pinfall	Singles match for the AEW National Championship	15:36
8	Michael Oku (with Amira Blair) defeated Connor Mills by pinfall	Singles match	15:36
9	Mercedes Moné (c) defeated Rhio by pinfall	Winner Takes All match for the DW Women's Championship, the EWA Women's Championship, and the Undisputed British Women's Championship	17:49
10	Jay Joshua defeated Sha Samuels (c)	Singles match for the Undisputed British Heavyweight Championship	13:49
(c) / – the champion(s) heading into the match

== See also ==
- Professional wrestling in the United Kingdom
- List of professional wrestling promotions in Europe
