= RPW/NJPW Uprising 2015 =

Professional wrestling event

Uprising 2015
- Promotional poster for the event, featuring wrestlers from both NJPW and RPW
- Promotion(s): New Japan Pro-Wrestling; Revolution Pro Wrestling
- Date: October 2, 2015
- City: Bethnal Green, London, England
- Venue: York Hall
- Attendance: 680

Event chronology
← Previous; Destruction in Kobe (NJPW); Live In Southampton (RPW)	Next → Global Wars UK (NJPW / RPW)

Uprising chronology
← Previous; 2014	Next → 2016

The 2015 Uprising was the fourth Uprising professional wrestling supershow promoted by the British Revolution Pro Wrestling (RPW), in partnership with the Japanese New Japan Pro-Wrestling (NJPW) promotion. The event was held on October 2, 2015 in the York Hall in Bethnal Green, London, England. The event marked the first collaborative event held by RPW and NJPW.

== Production ==
Other on-screen personnel
Role:	Name:
Commentators	Chris Charlton (English-language announcer)
Commentators	Don Callis (English-language announcer)
Commentators	Kevin Kelly (English-language announcer)
Ring announcers	Makoto Abe
Referees	Kenta Sato
Referees	Marty Asami
Referees	Red Shoes Unno
Referees	Tiger Hattori

The event was the first collaborative event held by NJPW and RPW; the two promotions had established a working relationships early in the year as a part of NJPW's "New IWGP Conception." The show was scheduled to featured eight matches, two of which were to be contested for championships.

== Results ==
No.	Results	Stipulations	Times
1	The Revolutionists (James Castle and Sha Samuels) defeated Tencozy (Hiroyoshi Tenzan and Satoshi Kojima)	Tag team match	8:29
2	Martin Kirby defeated A. C. H.	Singles match	11:42
3	Shinsuke Nakamura defeated Big Damo	Singles match	15:10
4	Hiroshi Tanahashi and Jyushin Thunder Liger defeated Chaos (Gedo and Kazuchika Okada)	Tag team match	16:30
5	Kyle O'Reilly defeated Kushida	Singles match	17:43
6	Tetsuya Naito defeated Mark Haskins	Singles match	12:58
7	Josh Bodom (c) defeated Jimmy Havoc	No disqualification match for the British Cruiserweight Championship	16:10
8	AJ Styles (c) defeated Marty Scurll and Will Ospreay	Three-way match for the British Heavyweight Championship	18:22
(c) / – the champion(s) heading into the match

== Aftermath ==
The following night on October 3, the inaugural Global Wars UK event was held. Global Wars UK has since become an annual tour held by NJPW and RPW.

== See also ==
- Professional wrestling in the United Kingdom
- List of professional wrestling promotions in Europe
