= Destruction in Okayama (2015) =

Professional wrestling event

- Promotional poster for the event, featuring various NJPW wrestlers
- Promotion: New Japan Pro-Wrestling
- Date: September 23, 2015
- City: Okayama, Japan
- Venue: Momotaro Arena
- Attendance: 3,160

Event chronology
← Previous; Road to Destruction	Next → Destruction in Kobe

Destruction chronology
← Previous; Okayama 2014	Next → Kobe 2015

New Japan Pro-Wrestling events chronology
← Previous; Dominion 7.5 in Osaka-jo Hall	Next → Destruction in Kobe

Destruction in Okayama (2015) was a professional wrestling event promoted by New Japan Pro-Wrestling (NJPW). The event took place on September 23, 2015, in Okayama, Okayama at the Momotaro Arena. The event featured nine matches, four of which were contested for championships. It was the tenth event under the Destruction name.

== Storylines ==
Destruction in Okayama featured nine professional wrestling matches that involved different wrestlers from pre-existing scripted feuds and storylines. Wrestlers portrayed villains, heroes, or less distinguishable characters in the scripted events that built tension and culminated in a wrestling match or series of matches.

Destruction in Okayama as well as Destruction in Kobe, which took place four days later, were the first major events taking place after NJPW's annual premier tournament, the G1 Climax. Destruction in Okayama was main evented by Togi Makabe defending his NEVER Openweight Championship against Kota Ibushi. The title match stemmed from the 2015 G1 Climax tournament, during which Ibushi defeated Makabe in a non-title match. Ibushi, a former three-time IWGP Junior Heavyweight Champion, was looking for his first heavyweight title, having earlier in the year failed in his attempts to capture both the IWGP Heavyweight and IWGP Intercontinental Championships. Ibushi has also previously wrestled for the NEVER Openweight Championship, losing to then defending champion Tomohiro Ishii on May 25, 2014, during his last reign as the IWGP Junior Heavyweight Champion. Part of the storyline heading into the title match in Okayama involved Ibushi trying to beat Makabe in his own game by moving away from his usual high-flying wrestling style to instead trying to match the champion with strikes.

Another title match saw Kushida defend his IWGP Junior Heavyweight Championship against previous champion Kenny Omega. This was a rematch from July 5 and the Dominion 7.5 in Osaka-jo Hall event, where Kushida, after winning the 2015 Best of the Super Juniors tournament, defeated Omega to capture the title. The event's third title match saw the returning National Wrestling Alliance (NWA) representative Steve Anthony defend the NWA World Junior Heavyweight Championship against Tiger Mask. Anthony made his NJPW on April 29, 2015, when he successfully defended the NWA World Junior Heavyweight Championship against Tiger Mask's tag team partner Jyushin Thunder Liger. Tiger Mask promised to defeat Anthony for the title and then defend it against Liger at Korakuen Hall.

Several matches at Destruction in Okayama served as a build-up to matches taking place at Destruction in Kobe and on October 12 at King of Pro-Wrestling. These included IWGP Heavyweight Champion Kazuchika Okada and top contender A.J. Styles facing off in a tag team match, 2015 G1 Climax winner Hiroshi Tanahashi and his Kobe opponent Bad Luck Fale facing off in a six-man tag team match and Katsuyori Shibata and Tetsuya Naito, whose rivalry started at the G1 Climax, facing off in the opening eight-man tag team match. The event also featured the NJPW debut of former Dragon Gate and WWE performer Matt Sydal. Sydal's NJPW debut follows a Ring of Honor (ROH) event on August 21, where he defeated IWGP Junior Heavyweight Champion Kushida in a non-title match, after which Kushida agreed to a title match between the two.

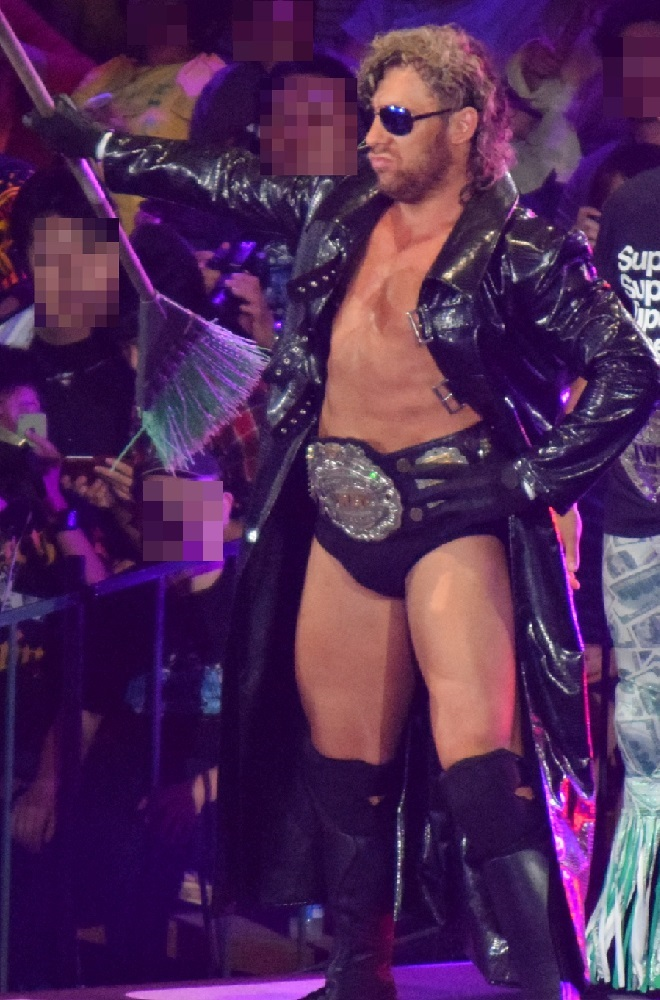
Kenny Omega, who regained the IWGP Junior Heavyweight Championship at Destruction in Okayama

Originally it was announced that at Destruction in Okayama, IWGP Tag Team Champions Doc Gallows and Karl Anderson would be taking on Hiroyoshi Tenzan and Satoshi Kojima in a non-title match. However, when Kojima pinned Gallows in an eight-man tag team match on the September 4 "Road to Destruction" event, he and Tenzan made a challenge for a title match. The following day, NJPW announced that the match would now be contested for the IWGP Tag Team Championship. The match marked Tenzan and Kojima's first shot at the IWGP Tag Team Championship since November 2013.

== Event ==
In the first title match of the event, Tiger Mask defeated Steve Anthony to win the NWA World Junior Heavyweight Championship for the second time, nine and a half years after his first win. Following the match, Tiger Mask nominated Jyushin Thunder Liger as his first challenger. In the second title match, Bullet Club's Doc Gallows and Karl Anderson made their first successful defense of the IWGP Tag Team Championship against Hiroyoshi Tenzan and Satoshi Kojima.

The third title match of the event saw Kushida defend the IWGP Junior Heavyweight Championship against previous champion, Bullet Club's Kenny Omega. In the finish of the match, while Doc Gallows had the referee distracted, Karl Anderson entered the ring and hit Kushida with his Gun Stun finishing move. This allowed Omega to hit Kushida with his own finishing move, the Katayoku no Tenshi, to win the match and regain the IWGP Junior Heavyweight Championship, ending Kushida’s reign in his second defense. Following the win, Omega nominated Matt Sydal, who had debuted earlier in the show, as his first challenger.

In the main event of the show, Togi Makabe made his second successful defense of the NEVER Openweight Championship against Kota Ibushi. The show ended with Tomohiro Ishii entering the ring to challenge Makabe to a title match, which was promptly accepted by the champion.

== Results ==
No.	Results	Stipulations	Times
1	Katsuyori Shibata, Sho Tanaka, Yohei Komatsu and Yuji Nagata defeated David Finlay, Jay White, Manabu Nakanishi and Tetsuya Naito	Eight-man tag team match	07:47
2	reDRagon (Bobby Fish and Kyle O'Reilly) defeated Jyushin Thunder Liger and Máscara Dorada	Tag team match	08:31
3	Tiger Mask defeated Steve Anthony (c) (with Bruce Tharpe)	Singles match for the NWA World Junior Heavyweight Championship	10:10
4	Hiroshi Tanahashi and Matt Sydal defeated Bullet Club (Bad Luck Fale and Tama Tonga)	Tag team match	10:00
5	Bullet Club (Doc Gallows and Karl Anderson) (c) defeated Tencozy (Hiroyoshi Tenzan and Satoshi Kojima)	Tag team match for the IWGP Tag Team Championship	13:15
6	Chaos (Beretta, Rocky Romero, Shinsuke Nakamura, Tomohiro Ishii and Yoshi-Hashi) defeated Alex Shelley, Captain New Japan, Hirooki Goto, Ryusuke Taguchi and Tomoaki Honma	Ten-man tag team match	13:24
7	Chaos (Kazuchika Okada and Toru Yano) defeated Bullet Club (A.J. Styles and Cody Hall)	Tag team match	09:52
8	Kenny Omega (with Doc Gallows) defeated Kushida (c) (with Alex Shelley)	Singles match for the IWGP Junior Heavyweight Championship	16:26
9	Togi Makabe (c) defeated Kota Ibushi	Singles match for the NEVER Openweight Championship	18:41
(c) / – the champion(s) heading into the match
