= Destruction in Kobe (2015) =

2015 professional wrestling event

- Promotional poster for the event, featuring various NJPW wrestlers
- Promotion: New Japan Pro-Wrestling
- Date: September 27, 2015
- City: Kobe, Japan
- Venue: Kobe World Memorial Hall
- Attendance: 6,120

Event chronology
← Previous; Destruction in Okayama	Next → Global Wars UK

Destruction chronology
← Previous; Okayama 2015	Next → Tokyo

Destruction in Kobe (2015) was a professional wrestling event promoted by New Japan Pro-Wrestling (NJPW). The event took place on September 27, 2015, in Kobe, Hyōgo at the Kobe World Memorial Hall. The event featured nine matches, two of which were contested for championships. It was the eleventh event under the Destruction name.

== Storylines ==
Destruction in Kobe featured nine professional wrestling matches that involved different wrestlers from pre-existing scripted feuds and storylines. Wrestlers portrayed villains, heroes, or less distinguishable characters in the scripted events that built tension and culminated in a wrestling match or series of matches.

Destruction in Kobe as well as Destruction in Okayama, which took place four days prior, were the first major events taking place after NJPW's annual premier tournament, the G1 Climax. Destruction in Kobe was main evented by Hirooki Goto defending his IWGP Intercontinental Championship against former four-time champion Shinsuke Nakamura. This marks the fourth singles match and the third title match of 2015 between Goto and Nakamura. Goto originally won the title from Nakamura on May 3 at Wrestling Dontaku 2015 and then successfully defended it against him on July 5 at Dominion 7.5 in Osaka-jo Hall. However, during the 2015 G1 Climax tournament, Nakamura defeated Goto in a non-title match, leading to the title match at Destruction in Kobe. Goto himself nominated Nakamura as his next challenger, wanting to fully settle the score with him and then use the win to propel himself to an IWGP Heavyweight Championship match, due to his win over reigning champion Kazuchika Okada during the 2015 G1 Climax. Goto also proposed a stipulation, where the loser of the match would be exiled indefinitely from the Intercontinental Championship picture. Another top match would see 2015 G1 Climax winner Hiroshi Tanahashi defend his prize for winning said tournament, a contract for an IWGP Heavyweight Championship match at Wrestle Kingdom 10 in Tokyo Dome, against Bad Luck Fale. This match also stemmed from the G1 Climax, where Tanahashi suffered one of his two losses against Fale.

The second title match of Destruction in Kobe saw the returning Time Splitters (Alex Shelley and Kushida) challenge reDRagon (Bobby Fish and Kyle O'Reilly) for the IWGP Junior Heavyweight Tag Team Championship. Time Splitters had been inactive since May's 2015 Best of the Super Juniors, where Shelley was injured in his opening match, while Kushida won the tournament to kick start his singles career, which eventually led to him capturing the IWGP Junior Heavyweight Championship. Kushida's singles title reign ended at Destruction in Okayama, four days before the tag team title match in Kobe. reDRagon make their first defense of the IWGP Junior Heavyweight Tag Team Championship after capturing the title from The Young Bucks (Matt Jackson and Nick Jackson) on August 16, during the final day of the 2015 G1 Climax.

In the weeks leading to the 2015 G1 Climax, Tetsuya Naito debuted a new villainous persona, inspired by the Consejo Mundial de Lucha Libre (CMLL) stable Los Ingobernables, which he had recently joined on a trip to Mexico. During the tournament, Naito and Shibata wrestled in the same block and faced off on July 24 in a match, where Shibata defeated Naito. After both Naito and Shibata were eliminated from the tournament, they faced off in non-tournament tag team matches during the last two nights. During the matches, Naito drew the ire of Shibata by cheap shotting him, leading to two post-match brawls between the two. The brewing rivalry led to NJPW booking a match between the two for Destruction in Kobe. Naito, the other wrestler to have defeated Tanahashi during the 2015 G1 Climax, was also in line for a shot at the Tokyo Dome contract, but stated that he was willing to wait until the end of the year for the match.

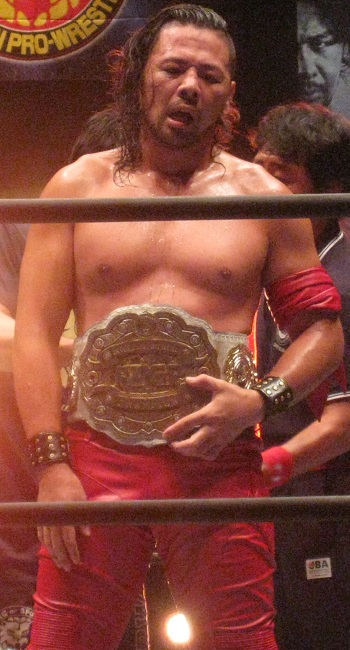
Shinsuke Nakamura, who regained the IWGP Intercontinental Championship in the main event of Destruction in Kobe

The event would also feature a six-man tag team match between the Bullet Club and Chaos stables, building up an IWGP Heavyweight Championship match between champion Kazuchika Okada and challenger A.J. Styles on October 12 at King of Pro-Wrestling. The event also featured former WWE NXT performer Juice Robinson, who also worked the entire "Road to Destruction" tour, his first tour with NJPW. Robinson had previously announced that he would be retiring from professional wrestling on August 29, 2015, but it was now revealed that he was only retiring his NXT persona CJ Parker.

== Event ==
In the fourth match of the event, Hiroyoshi Tenzan, Matt Sydal and Satoshi Kojima defeated the Bullet Club trio of IWGP Tag Team Champions Doc Gallows and Karl Anderson and new IWGP Junior Heavyweight Champion Kenny Omega. Sydal, who had emerged as Omega's first challenger at Destruction in Okayama, scored the pinfall over his future title opponent. In the fifth match, Tetsuya Naito was victorious in his grudge match against Katsuyori Shibata, scoring the pinfall after two low blows and the Destino finishing move. After the match, Naito went to attack a cameraman, but was himself attacked by Shibata, with the two brawling backstage. In the first title match of the event, reDRagon defeated the reunited Time Splitters to make their first successful defense of the IWGP Junior Heavyweight Tag Team Championship. After the match, the champions were attacked by Roppongi Vice (Beretta and Rocky Romero), who declared themselves the next champions.

In the next match, Hiroshi Tanahashi successfully defended his contract for an IWGP Heavyweight Championship match at the Tokyo Dome against Bad Luck Fale. Afterwards, Tanahashi nominated Tetsuya Naito as his next challenger. Naito appeared on the entrance ramp smirking, but did not respond to the challenge. In the main event of the show, Shinsuke Nakamura defeated Hirooki Goto to regain the IWGP Intercontinental Championship, marking the start of his fifth reign. Following the match, Karl Anderson entered and claimed he deserved a shot at the IWGP Intercontinental Championship, having defeated both Nakamura and Goto during the 2015 G1 Climax. The match was accepted by Nakamura.

== Results ==
No.	Results	Stipulations	Times
1	Sho Tanaka and Yohei Komatsu defeated David Finlay and Jay White	Tag team match	05:00
2	Jyushin Thunder Liger, Tiger Mask and Yuji Nagata defeated Captain New Japan, Juice Robinson and Manabu Nakanishi	Six-man tag team match	08:44
3	Chaos (Beretta, Rocky Romero, Tomohiro Ishii and Yoshi-Hashi) defeated Máscara Dorada, Ryusuke Taguchi and G.B.H. (Togi Makabe and Tomoaki Honma)	Eight-man tag team match	07:48
4	Hiroyoshi Tenzan, Matt Sydal and Satoshi Kojima defeated Bullet Club (Doc Gallows, Karl Anderson and Kenny Omega)	Six-man tag team match	10:52
5	Tetsuya Naito defeated Katsuyori Shibata	Singles match	11:49
6	Chaos (Kazuchika Okada, Kazushi Sakuraba and Toru Yano) defeated Bullet Club (A.J. Styles, Cody Hall and Tama Tonga)	Six-man tag team match	12:18
7	reDRagon (Bobby Fish and Kyle O'Reilly) (c) defeated Time Splitters (Alex Shelley and Kushida)	Tag team match for the IWGP Junior Heavyweight Tag Team Championship	16:17
8	Hiroshi Tanahashi defeated Bad Luck Fale	Singles match for the Tokyo Dome IWGP Heavyweight Championship challenge rights certificate	16:37
9	Shinsuke Nakamura defeated Hirooki Goto (c)	Singles match for the IWGP Intercontinental Championship	22:56
(c) / – the champion(s) heading into the match
