= RevPro Uprising =

Professional wrestling supercard by RevPro

Uprising
- Promotions: Revolution Pro Wrestling
- First event: 2012

Uprising is a major professional wrestling event produced by Revolution Pro Wrestling (RPW). The event has been annually produced in RPW from 2012 to present, with the exception of 2020, when the event was cancelled due to the COVID-19 pandemic. The 2015 edition of the event was held in conjunction with RPW's partner promotion New Japan Pro-Wrestling.

== Dates, venues and main events ==
Event	Date	City	Venue	Main event	Ref.
Uprising (2012)	October 13, 2012	Swallows Leisure Centre	Sittingbourne, Kent, England	El Generico (c) vs. El Ligero for the KO-D Openweight Championship	
Uprising (2012)	October 14, 2012	Swallows Leisure Centre	Sittingbourne, Kent, England	Jerry Lynn vs. Noam Dar	
Uprising (2013)	October 19, 2013	York Hall	London, England	Hiroshi Tanahashi vs. Marty Scurll	
Uprising (2014)	October 18, 2014	York Hall	London, England	Matt Sydal vs. Will Ospreay	
Uprising (2015)	October 2, 2015	York Hall	London, England	A.J. Styles (c) vs. Marty Scurll vs. Will Ospreay in a three-way match for the British Heavyweight Championship	
Uprising (2016)	August 12, 2016	York Hall	London, England	Vader vs. Will Ospreay	
Uprising (2017)	December 8, 2017	York Hall	London, England	Bullet Club (Marty Scurll and The Young Bucks (Matt Jackson and Nick Jackson)) vs. CCK (Chris Brookes and Travis Banks) and Flip Gordon	
Uprising (2018)	November 9, 2018	York Hall	London, England	Tomohiro Ishii vs. David Starr for the Undisputed British Heavyweight Championship	
Uprising (2019)	December 15, 2019	York Hall	London, England	Michael Oku vs. Pac	
Uprising (2021)	November 21, 2021	York Hall	London, England	Will Ospreay (c) vs. Shota Umino for the Undisputed British Heavyweight Championship	
Uprising (2022)	December 17, 2022	York Hall	London, England	Tomohiro Ishii vs. Will Ospreay	
Uprising (2023)	December 16, 2023	Crystal Palace National Sports Centre	London, England	Will Ospreay vs. Gabriel Kidd	
Uprising (2024)	December 21, 2024	York Hall	London, England	Luke Jacobs (c) vs. Michael Oku for the Undisputed British Heavyweight Championship	
Uprising (2025)	December 14, 2025	Vale Arena	Cardiff, Wales	Sha Samuels (c) vs. Jay Joshua for the Undisputed British Heavyweight Championship	
