= Great British Tag League =

Tag team round robin tournament

The Great British Tag League is a tag team round robin tournament produced by Revolution Pro Wrestling. The tournament format is modeled after New Japan Pro-Wrestling's World Tag League. The winners, if not the reigning champions, are awarded an Undisputed British Tag Team Championship title shot. And if the champions win the tournament, then they choose the challengers for their titles.

== Dates and venues of finals ==
Year	Event	Tournament winner	Times won	Date	City	Venue	Ref.
2021	Nine Year Anniversary	Destination Everywhere (Connor Mills and Michael Oku)	1 (1, 1)	August 21, 2021	Manchester, England	Victoria Warehouse	
2022	Summer Sizzler	The VeloCities (Jude London and Paris DeSilva)	1 (1, 1)	July 23, 2022	Manchester, England	Victoria Warehouse	
2023	Uprising	Greedy Souls (Brendan White and Danny Jones)	1 (1, 1)	December 16, 2023	London, England	Crystal Palace National Sports Centre	
2025	13th Anniversary Show	Connor Mills and Jay Joshua	1 (2, 1)	August 23, 2025	London, England	Crystal Palace National Sports Centre	

== 2021 ==
The 2021 edition of the Tag League took place between July 18 and August 21. The finals of the tournament were also disputed for the vacant British Tag Team Championship.

Final Standings
Block A		Block B	
Destination Everywhere (Connor Mills and Michael Oku)	6	The Legion (Lucian Phillips and Screwface Ahmed)	9
The Dream Team (Dean Allmark and Robbie X)	6	Sunshine Machine (Chuck Mambo and TK Cooper)	6
Young Guns (Ethan Allen and Luke Jacobs)	3	Charlie Sterling and Joel Redman	0
Lykos Gym (Kid Lykos and Kid Lykos II)	3	Callum Newman and JJ Gale	0

Block A	Mills Oku	Allmark Robbie	Allen Jacobs	Lykos Lykos II
Mills Oku	—N/a	Mills; Oku (19:06)^{1}	Mills; Oku (21:08)	Lykos; Lykos II (19:45)
Allmark Robbie	Mills; Oku (19:06)^{1}	—N/a	Allmark; Robbie (18:00)	Allmark; Robbie (13:16)
Allen Jacobs	Mills; Oku (21:08)	Allmark; Robbie (18:00)	—N/a	Allen; Jacobs (18:00)
Lykos Lykos II	Lykos; Lykos II (19:45)	Allmark; Robbie (13:16)	Allen; Jacobs (18:00)	—N/a
Block B	Newman Gale	Sterling Redman	Mambo Cooper	Phillips Ahmed
Newman Gale	—N/a	Sterling; Redman (15:45)	Mambo; Cooper (12:59)	Phillips; Ahmed (15:32)
Sterling Redman	Sterling; Redman (15:45)	—N/a	Mambo; Cooper (13:44)	Phillips; Ahmed (12:38)
Mambo Cooper	Mambo; Cooper (12:59)	Mambo; Cooper (13:44)	—N/a	Phillips; Ahmed (11:22)
Phillips Ahmed	Phillips; Ahmed (15:32)	Phillips; Ahmed (12:38)	Phillips; Ahmed (11:22)	—N/a

Final
A1	Destination Everywhere (Connor Mills and Michael Oku)	Pin
B1	The Legion (Lucian Phillips and Screwface Ahmed)	15:47

1 Lee Hunter replaced Robbie X for this match.

== 2022 ==
The 2022 edition of the Tag League took place between May 28 and July 23, 2022.

Final Standings
Block A		Block B	
Aussie Open (Kyle Fletcher and Mark Davis)	6	The VeloCities (Jude London and Paris De Silva)	5
Destination Everywhere (Connor Mills and Michael Oku)	4	Sunshine Machine (Chuck Mambo and TK Cooper)	3
Arrows of Hungary (Dover and Icarus)	2	Lykos Gym (Kid Lykos and Kid Lykos II)	2
Smokin' Aces (Charlie Sterling and Nick Riley)	0	The Legion (Shota Umino and Yota Tsuji)	2

Block A	Sterling Riley	Mills Oku	Dover Icarus	Fletcher Davis
Sterling Riley	—N/a	Mills; Oku (16:53)	Dover; Icarus (14:09)	Fletcher; Davis (17:20)
Mills Oku	Mills; Oku (16:53)	—N/a	Mills; Oku (13:06)	Fletcher; Davis (N/A)
Dover Icarus	Dover; Icarus (14:09)	Mills; Oku (13:06)	—N/a	Fletcher; Davis (10:02)
Fletcher Davis	Fletcher; Davis (17:20)	Fletcher; Davis (N/A)	Fletcher; Davis (10:02)	—N/a
Block B	Mambo Cooper	London De Silva	Lykos Lykos II	Umino Tsuji
Mambo Cooper	—N/a	Draw (30:00)	Mambo; Cooper (12:59)	Mambo; Cooper (20:38)
London De Silva	Draw (30:00)	—N/a	London; De Silva (15:51)	London; De Silva (20:06)
Lykos Lykos II	Lykos; Lykos II (11:59)	London; De Silva (15:51)	—N/a	Umino; Tsuji (8:43)
Umino Tsuji	Mambo; Cooper (20:38)	London; De Silva (20:06)	Umino; Tsuji (8:43)	—N/a

Final
A1	Aussie Open (Kyle Fletcher and Mark Davis)	Pin
B1	The VeloCities (Jude London and Paris De Silva)	26:21

== 2023 ==
The 2023 edition of the Tag League took place between September 24 and December 16.

Final Standings
Block A		Block B	
The Knights (Ricky Knight Jr. and Zak Knight/Anthony Ogogo)^{1}	9	Greedy Souls (Brendan White and Danny Jones)	6
Lykos Gym (Kid Lykos and Kid Lykos II)	6	Subculture (Flash Morgan Webster and Mark Andrews)	6
Kieron Lacey and Mark Trew	3	Sunshine Machine (Chuck Mambo and TK Cooper)	6
The Billington Bulldogs (Mark Billington and Thomas Billington)	0	CPF (Danny Black and Maverick Mayhew)	0

Block A	R. Knight Z. Knight/Ogogo	Lykos Lykos II	Lacey Trew	M. Billington T. Billington
R. Knight Z. Knight/Ogogo	—N/a	Ogogo (9:22)^{2}	R. Knight; Z. Knight (14:40)	R. Knight; Z. Knight (13:32)
Lykos Lykos II	Ogogo (9:22)^{2}	—N/a	Lykos; Lykos II (13:23)	Lykos; Lykos II (10:37)
Lacey Trew	R. Knight; Z. Knight (14:40)	Lykos; Lykos II (13:23)	—N/a	Lacey; Trew (11:22)
M. Billington T. Billington	R. Knight; Z. Knight (13:32)	Lykos; Lykos II (10:37)	Lacey; Trew (11:22)	—N/a
Block B	White Jones	Mambo Cooper	Black Mayhew	Webster Andrews
White Jones	—N/a	Mambo; Cooper (15:43)	White; Jones (9:54)	White; Jones (6:17)
Mambo Cooper	Mambo; Cooper (15:43)	—N/a	Mambo; Cooper (11:43)	Webster; Andrews (14:23)
Black Mayhew	White; Jones (9:54)	Mambo; Cooper (11:43)	—N/a	Webster; Andrews (14:42)
Webster Andrews	White; Jones (6:17)	Webster; Andrews (14:23)	Webster; Andrews (14:42)	—N/a

Block B Playoff
B1	Greedy Souls (Brendan White and Danny Jones)	Pin
B2	Subculture (Flash Morgan Webster and Dani Luna)^{3}	–
B3	Sunshine Machine (Chuck Mambo and TK Cooper)	17:19

Final; RevPro Uprising 2023
A1	Anthony Ogogo and Ricky Knight Jr.	14:30
B1	Greedy Souls (Brendan White and Danny Jones)	Pin

1 Ogogo replaced Zak for the remainder of the tournament after Zak joined All Elite Wrestling.
2 This was a handicap match between Ogogo and Lykos Gym.
3 Andrews was replaced by Luna in this match due to a torn tendon.

== 2025 ==
The 2025 edition of the Great British Tag League took between July 6 and August 23, 2025, with the finals being hosted at RevPro 13th Anniversary Show: Night 2.

Final Standings
Block A		Block B	
The Cowboy Way (1 Called Manders and Thomas Shire)	7	Connor Mills and Jay Joshua	9
Grizzled Young Veterans (James Drake and Zack Gibson)	6	Sons of Southhampton (David Francisco and JJ Gale)	3
Young Guns (Ethan Allen and Luke Jacobs)	4	Kieron Lacey and Mark Trew	3
Flying Bryant Brothers (Leland Bryant and Zander Bryant)	0	CPF (Danny Black and Joe Lando)	3

Block A	Manders Shire	Allen Jacobs	Drake Gibson	L. Bryant Z. Bryant
Manders Shire	—N/a	DCO (15:53)	Manders; Shire (19:28)	Manders; Shire (3:41)
Allen Jacobs	DCO (15:53)	—N/a	Drake; Gibson	Allen; Jacobs (9:00)
Drake Gibson	Manders; Shire (19:28)	Drake; Gibson	—N/a	Drake; Gibson
L. Bryant Z. Bryant	Manders; Shire (3:41)	Allen; Jacobs (9:00)	Drake; Gibson	—N/a
Block B	Mills Joshua	Black Lando	Francisco Gale	Lacey Trew
Mills Joshua	—N/a	Mills; Joshua	Mills; Joshua (30:48)	Mills; Joshua (10:46)
Black Lando	Mills; Joshua	—N/a	Black; Lando	Lacey; Trew (11:07)
Francisco Gale	Mills; Joshua (30:48)	Black; Lando	—N/a	Black; Lando
Lacey Trew	Mills; Joshua (10:46)	Lacey; Trew (11:07)	Black; Lando	—N/a

Final
A1	Cowboy Way (1 Called Manders and Thomas Shire)	20:03
B1	Connor Mills and Jay Joshua	Pin

== See also ==
- World Tag League (NJPW)
