= RevPro Uprising 2023 =

Uprising 2023
- Official poster of the event
- Promotion: Revolution Pro Wrestling
- Date: 16 December 2023
- City: Crystal Palace, London, England
- Venue: Crystal Palace National Sports Centre
- Attendance: 739

Uprising chronology
← Previous; 2022	Next → 2024

The 2023 Uprising was the eleventh Uprising professional wrestling supershow promoted by the British Revolution Pro Wrestling (RPW), in partnership with the Japanese New Japan Pro-Wrestling (NJPW) promotion as well as Mexican promotion Consejo Mundial de Lucha Libre (CMLL). The event was held on 16 December 2023, in the Crystal Palace National Sports Centre in Crystal Palace, London, England.

== Production ==
=== Storylines ===
The event featured nine professional wrestling matches that involve different wrestlers from pre-existing scripted feuds and storylines. Wrestlers portray heroes, villains, or less distinguishable characters in scripted events that build tension and culminate in a wrestling match or series of matches. Storylines are produced on RevPro's weekly tour-based shows.

=== Event ===
The event started with the singles confrontation between JJ Gale and Zack Sabre Jr., solded with the victory of the latter. Next up, Spike Trivet picked up a victory over Robbie X by referee's decision in another singles bout. The third match saw Leon Slater defeating Connor Mills to win the Undisputed British Cruiserweight Championship. Next up, Brendan White and Danny Jones defeated Anthony Ogogo and Ricky Knight Jr. in the 2023 Great British Tag League finals. The fifth match saw Tomohiro Ishii outmatching Luke Jacobs in singles competition. Next up, Dani Luna defeated Alex Windsor to win the Undisputed British Women's Championship, ending the latter's reign at 769 days which was the longest till date. In the seventh bout, Volador Jr. defeated Trent Seven in singles action. The semi main event saw Michael Oku retaining the Undisputed British Heavyweight Championship over Zack Gibson.

In the main event, Will Ospreay defeated Gabe Kidd by referee's decision in singles competition.

== Results ==
No.	Results	Stipulations	Times
1	Zack Sabre Jr. defeated JJ Gale	Singles match	11:59
2	Spike Trivet defeated Robbie X by referee's decision	Singles match	18:33
3	Leon Slater defeated Connor Mills (c) by pinfall	Singles match for the Undisputed British Cruiserweight Championship	11:08
4	Greedy Souls (Brendan White and Danny Jones) defeated Anthony Ogogo and Ricky Knight Jr. by pinfall	Tag team match for the Great British Tag League finals	12:30
5	Tomohiro Ishii defeated Luke Jacobs by pinfall	Singles match	14:57
6	Dani Luna defeated Alex Windsor (c)	Singles match for the Undisputed British Women's Championship	15:49
7	Volador Jr. defeated Trent Seven	Singles match	11:28
8	Michael Oku (c) (with Amira) defeated Zack Gibson by pinfall	Singles match for the Undisputed British Heavyweight Championship	18:15
9	Will Ospreay defeated Gabe Kidd by referee's decision	Singles match	23:59
(c) / – the champion(s) heading into the match

== See also ==
- Professional wrestling in the United Kingdom
- List of professional wrestling promotions in Europe
