= RevPro Uprising 2024 =

2024 RevPro professional wrestling event

Uprising 2024
- Official poster of the event
- Promotion: Revolution Pro Wrestling
- Date: 21 December 2024
- City: London, England
- Venue: York Hall

Uprising chronology
| ← Previous; 2023 | Next → 2025 |

The 2024 Uprising was the twelfth Uprising professional wrestling supershow promoted by the British wrestling promotion Revolution Pro Wrestling (RevPro). The event also featured wrestlers from Total Nonstop Action Wrestling (TNA) and All Elite Wrestling (AEW). The event took place on 21 December 2024, at the York Hall in London, England.

Seven matches were contested at the event. In the main event, Michael Oku defeated Luke Jacobs to become the new Undisputed British Heavyweight Champion. In other prominent matches, Jay Joshua and Connor Mills defeated Sunshine Machine (Chuck Mambo and TK Cooper) to become the new Undisputed British Tag Team Champions, Zozaya defeated Leon Slater 3–2 in sudden death overtime in the first ever RevPro 60-minute Iron man match, and Mina Shirakawa defeated Dani Luna to retain the Undisputed British Women's Championship.

== Production ==
=== Storylines ===
The event includes matches that each resulted from scripted storylines, where wrestlers portrayed heroes, villains, or less distinguishable characters in scripted events that built tension and culminated in a wrestling match or series of matches.

=== Event ===
The event started with the singles confrontation between All Elite Wrestling's Serena Deeb and Kanji, solded with the victory of the latter. Next up, Danny Black, Joe Lando, and Maverick Mayhew defeated Will Kaven, Mark Trew and Kieron Lacey to retain the Trios Grand Prix Trophies. The third bout saw Mina Shirakawa defeating Dani Luna to retain the Undisputed British Women's Championship, factor which made Shirakawa's match against Mercedes Mone from Wrestle Dynasty on 5 January 2025 a winner takes all bout also disputed for Mone's Strong Women's Championship. Next up, Zozaya picked up a victory over Leon Slater score 3–2 in a 60-minute Iron man match which initially concluded in a time limit draw after the regular time but was restarted by Revolution Pro Wrestling founder Andy Quildan. In the fifth match, Jay Joshua and Connor Mills defeated Sunshine Machine (Chuck Mambo and TK Cooper) to win the Undisputed British Tag Team Championship. In the sixth bout, Máscara Dorada defeated Robbie X in singles competition.

In the main event, Michael Oku defeated Luke Jacobs to win the Undisputed British Heavyweight Championship.

== Results ==
| No. | Results | Stipulations | Times |
|---|---|---|---|
| 1 | Kanji defeated Serena Deeb by pinfall | Singles match | 15:54 |
| 2 | CPF (Danny Black, Joe Lando, and Maverick Mayhew) (c) defeated Will Kaven, Mark Trew and Kieron Lacey by pinfall | Six-man tag team match for the Trios Grand Prix Trophies | 7:07 |
| 3 | Mina Shirakawa (c) defeated Dani Luna by pinfall | Singles match for the Undisputed British Women's Championship | 13:39 |
| 4 | Zozaya defeated Leon Slater 3–2 in sudden death overtime | 60-minute Iron man match | 63:02 |
| 5 | Jay Joshua and Connor Mills defeated Sunshine Machine (Chuck Mambo and TK Cooper) (c) by pinfall | Tag team match for the Undisputed British Tag Team Championship | 15:48 |
| 6 | Máscara Dorada defeated Robbie X by pinfall | Singles match | 12:23 |
| 7 | Michael Oku (with Amira) defeated Luke Jacobs (c) by submission | Singles match for the Undisputed British Heavyweight Championship | 15:54 |
(c) / – the champion(s) heading into the match

=== Iron Man match ===
| Score | | Point winner | Decision | Notes | Time |
|---|---|---|---|---|---|
| Zozaya | Slater | Point winner | Decision | Notes | Time |
| 1 | 0 | Zozaya | Pinfall | Zozaya pinned Slater with an inside cradle | 33:03 |
| 2 | 0 | Zozaya | Pinfall | Zozaya pinned Slater with a roll-up | 35:58 |
| 2 | 1 | Leon Slater | Submission | Slater submitted Zozaya to the Rings of Saturn | 42:57 |
| 2 | 2 | Leon Slater | Pinfall | Slater pinned Zozaya after an avalanche uranage | 59:53 |
| 3 | 2 | Zozaya | Pinfall | Zozaya pinned Slater after an avalanche Death Valley driver | 63:02 |

== See also ==
- Professional wrestling in the United Kingdom
- List of professional wrestling promotions in Europe
