= Greedy Souls =

Professional wrestling tag team

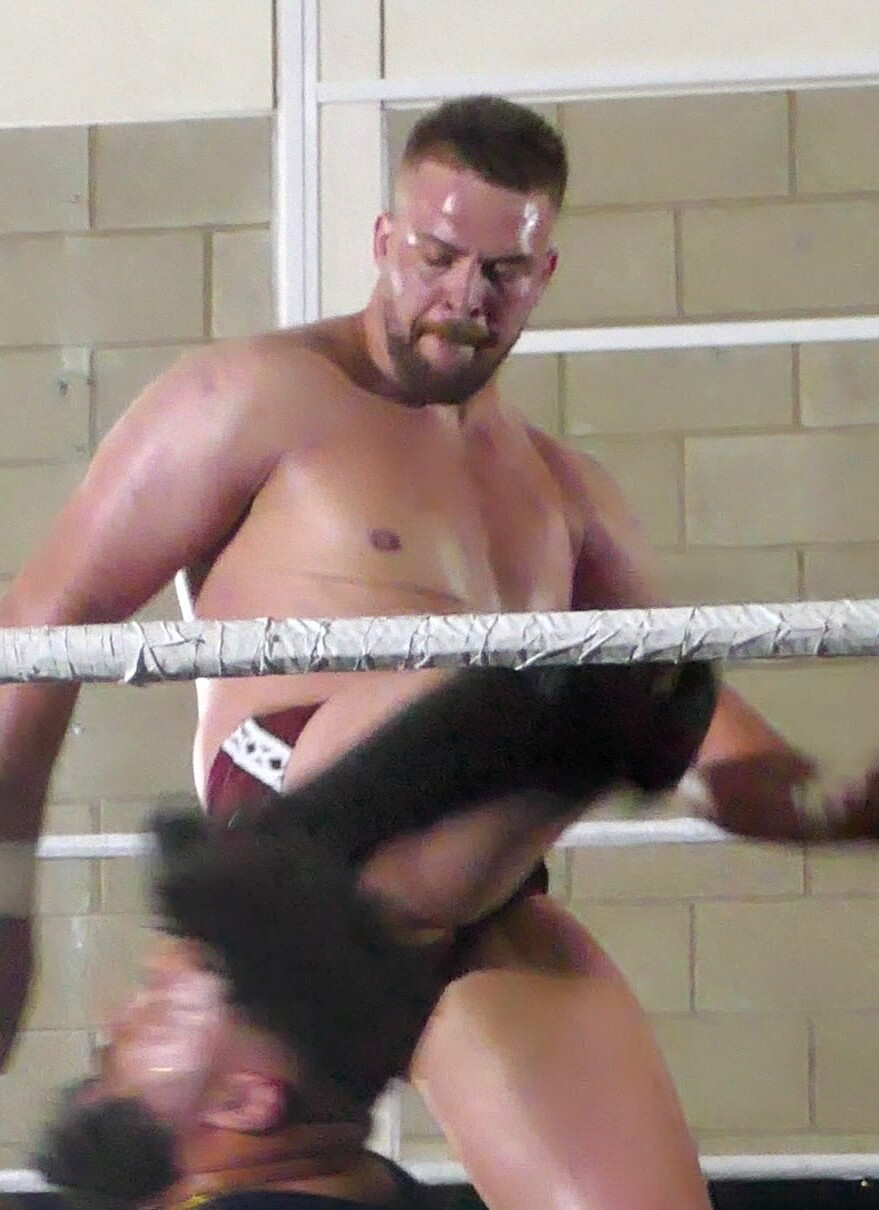
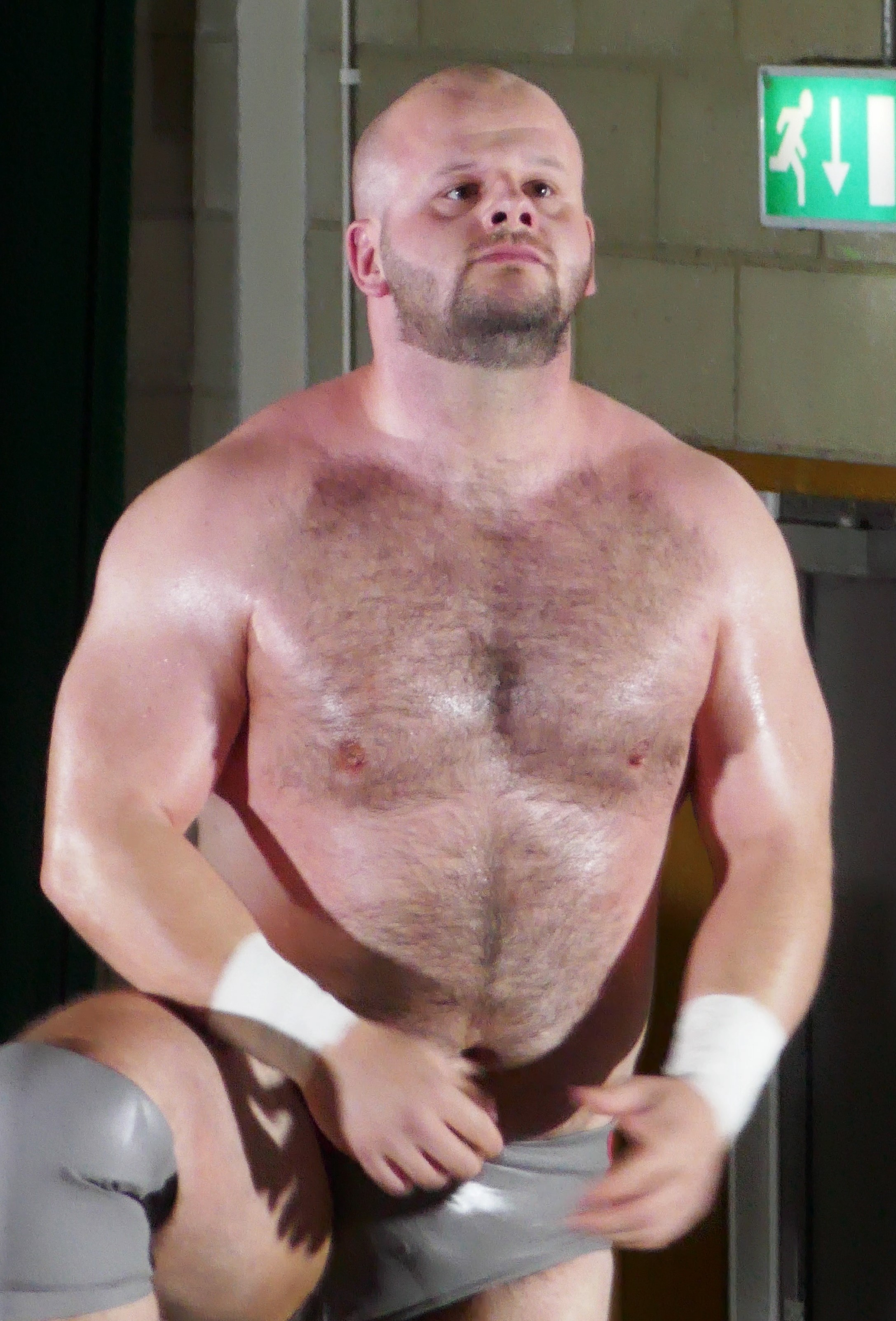
- Danny Jones (left) and Brendan White (right)

Tag team
- Members: Brendan White; Danny Jones
- Name: Greedy Souls Modern Culture
- Billed heights: Jones: 6 ft 3 in (1.91 m); White: 6 ft 1 in (1.85 m)
- Combined billed weight: Jones: 194 lbs White: 190 lbs
- Debut: 2019
- Years active: 2019–present

Greedy Souls is a British professional wrestling tag team consisting of Brendan White and Danny Jones. They are known for their tenures with Revolution Pro Wrestling (RevPro), Progress Wrestling and other promotios from the British independent scene and for various other promotions.

== Professional wrestling career ==
=== British independent circuit (2019–present) ===
White and Jones made their debut as a tag team under the ring name of "Modern Culture" at PWC It's Alright, It's Just A Little Airborne!, a house show promoted by Pro Wrestling Chaos on 1 June 2019, where they defeated Jay Joshua and Nico Angelo. They won both singles and tag titles in the promotion. They also sporadically competed in various other promotions such as Insane Championship Wrestling (ICW), TNT Extreme Wrestling (TNT) and Riot Cabaret Pro Wrestling (RCPW).

At Royal Quest IV, an event promoted by New Japan Pro Wrestling on 20 October 2024, White and Jones fell short to Young Blood (Yuto Nakashima and Oskar Leube).

==== Progress Wrestling (2021–2022) ====
White and Jones made their debut in Progress Wrestling at Progress Chapter 109: Dreaming In 3D on 24 April 2021, where they fell short to Smokin' Aces (Charlie Sterling and Nick Riley) in the first rounds of a tournament disputed for the PROGRESS Tag Team Championship. They first challenged directly for the titles at Progress Chapter 120: Total Protonic Reversals on 9 September 2021, where they fell short to reigning champions Lykos Gym (Kid Lykos and Kid Lykos II). They challenged again for the titles at PROGRESS Chapter 137: The Deadly Viper Tour - Codename: Copperhead on 13 August 2022, this time against Sunshine Machine (Chuck Mambo and TK Cooper) were again unsuccessful.

==== Revolution Pro Wrestling (2021–present) ====
White and Jones made their debut in Revolution Pro Wrestling (RevPro) at RevPro Seasons Beatings 2021 on 27 December, where they teamed up with Laura Di Matteo in a losing effort against Kenneth Halfpenny, Mariah May and Shaun Jackson as a result of a intergender tag team match. They won the British Tag Team Championship for the first time at RevPro Live In London 66 on 23 October 2022, by defeating Sunshine Machine (Chuck Mambo and TK Cooper).

During their time with the promotion, White and Jones competed in various signature events. In the RevPro High Stakes branch of events, the team was first represented by White at the 2021 edition from 19 September, where he teamed up with Doug Williams in a losing effort against The Young Guns (Ethan Allen and Luke Jacobs) defeated Sunshine Machine (Chuck Mambo and TK Cooper) and Two Extremely Athletic Men (Kenneth Halfpenny and Shaun Jackson) as a result of a Scramble match. At RevPro 12th Anniversary Show on 24 August 2024, they competed in an eight-man tag team match in which they teamed up with Goldenboy Santos and David Francisco in a losing effort against Joshua James, Sha Samuels and Young Blood (Oskar Leube and Yuto Nakashima).

In the Great British Tag League, White and Jones made their first appearance at the 2023 edition of the tournament, which they won by topping the B block with six points after going against the teams of Subculture (Flash Morgan Webster and Mark Andrews), Sunshine Machine (Chuck Mambo and TK Cooper) and CPF (Danny Black and Maverick Mayhew), then defeating Anthony Ogogo and Ricky Knight Jr. in the finals which took place at RevPro Uprising 2023.

=== Westside Xtreme Wrestling (2023, 2025) ===
White and Jones made their debut in Westside Xtreme Wrestling at wXw Back To The Roots 2023 on 28 January, where they fell short to Metehan and Rambo. They returned to the promotion at the 202t edition of the WXw World Tag Team Festival which they won by defeating Dragon Dia and Dragon Kid in the first rounds, Violence Is Forever (Dominic Garrini and Kevin Ku) in the semifinals, and The Grind (Laurance Roman and Nick Schreier) in the finals.

== Championships and accomplishments ==
- Attack! Pro Wrestling
  - Attack! Tag Team Championship (1 time, current)
  - Attack! 24:7 Championship (1 time) – Jones
- Evolution Wrestling
  - EVW Heavyweight Championship (2 times) - White (2)
- Pro Wrestling Chaos
  - All Wales Championship (1 time) – White
  - Undisputed King Of Chaos Championship (3 times) – White (1) and Jones (2)
- Pro Wrestling Illustrated
  - Ranked No. 63 of the top 100 tag teams in the PWI Tag Team 100 of 2023
- Revolution Pro Wrestling
  - British Tag Team Championship (1 time)
  - Great British Tag League (2023)
- Riot Cabaret Pro Wrestling
  - Riot Cabaret Tag Team Championship (1 time)
- Slammasters Wrestling
  - SMW Tag Team Championship (1 time)
- Westside Xtreme Wrestling
  - wXw World Tag Team Championship (1 time)
  - WXw World Tag Team Festival (2025)
