= Kenny Omega =

Canadian-born professional wrestler (born 1983)

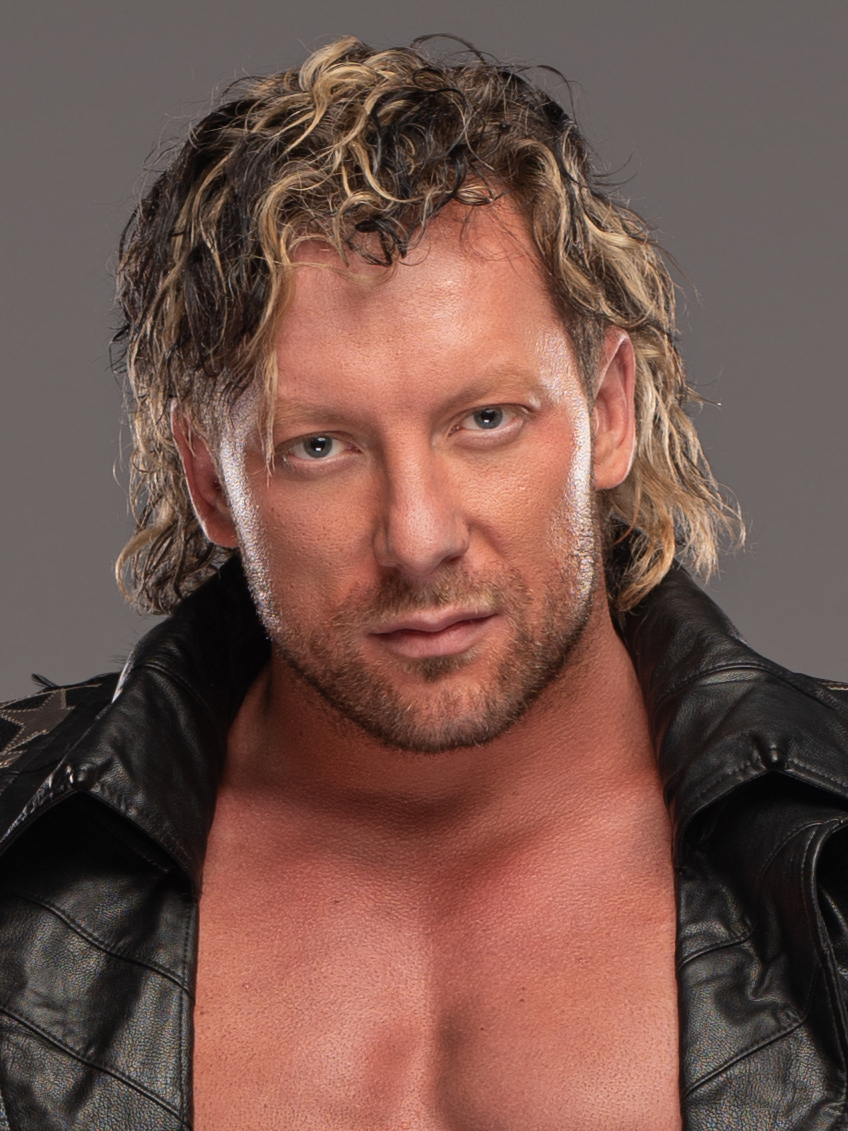
- Omega in 2019
- Born: Tyson Smith; October 16, 1983 (age 43); Winnipeg, Manitoba, Canada
- Employer: All Elite Wrestling
- Title: Executive Vice President
- Professional wrestling career
- Ring name(s): Kenny Omega; Scott Carpenter
- Billed height: 6 ft 0 in (183 cm)
- Billed weight: 229 lb (104 kg)
- Billed from: Winnipeg, Manitoba, Canada
- Trained by: Bobby Jay; Dave Taylor; Mentallo; Top Rope Championship Wrestling; Vance Nevada
- Debut: February 2000

Twitch information
- Channel: thecleanerscorner
- Years active: 2024–present
- Genres: Gaming; Just Chatting
- Followers: 31K
- Last updated: September 07, 2025

Tyson Smith (born October 16, 1983), better known by his ring name Kenny Omega (Japanese: ケニー・オメガ, Hepburn: Kenī Omega), is a Canadian-born (Note: It was revealed in October 2018 that Omega had acquired Japanese citizenship and is thus assumed to no longer be a Canadian citizen, as Japanese nationality law requires Japanese citizens to relinquish citizenship of any other country.) professional wrestler. As of February 2019, he is signed to All Elite Wrestling (AEW), where he serves as both an active wrestler and an executive vice president. He is the leader of The Elite stable. Known for his in-ring ability and technical prowess, he is regarded as one of the greatest professional wrestlers of all time.

Before joining AEW in 2019, Omega was known for his tenure in New Japan Pro-Wrestling (NJPW) from 2014 to 2019, during which he held the IWGP Heavyweight Championship and IWGP United States Heavyweight Championship, in addition to various other titles. He was also a former member and leader of NJPW's Bullet Club stable. He incorporates elements from video games in his persona. Throughout his career, Omega has also performed as part of independent promotions worldwide, including DDT Pro-Wrestling, Jersey All Pro Wrestling, and Pro Wrestling Guerrilla, as well as larger promotions, such as Ring of Honor, Impact Wrestling, and Lucha Libre AAA Worldwide. While wrestling in the latter two promotions, he held the Impact World Championship and AAA Mega Championship, and during the spring and summer of 2021, he held the AEW World, Impact World, and AAA Mega titles simultaneously as a triple champion. In AEW, he has held the AEW World Championship twice, the AEW World Tag Team Championship once (with "Hangman" Adam Page), the AEW World Trios Championship twice (both times with Matt Jackson and Nick Jackson), and the AEW International Championship once. He became AEW's inaugural Triple Crown winner in September 2022 after winning the World Trios title, and then AEW's inaugural Grand Slam champion by winning the International Championship in March 2025.he has headlined several Pay-per-view events, including the AEW and New Japan's respective premier annual events , All in and Wrestle Kingdom.

Widely regarded as one of the best professional wrestlers of all time, Omega was named Sports Illustrated's Wrestler of the Year in 2017 and topped Pro Wrestling Illustrated's list of top 500 male wrestlers the following year and in 2021. He has also attained the latter publication's Match of the Year distinction three times; one of those matches, in which Omega competed against Kazuchika Okada in a two out of three falls match at Dominion 6.9 in Osaka-jo Hall in June 2018, received a seven-star rating from sports journalist Dave Meltzer, the highest rating Meltzer has ever awarded a professional wrestling match. He was inducted into the Wrestling Observer Newsletter Hall of Fame in 2020.

== Early life ==
Tyson Smith was born in Winnipeg on October 16, 1983, and grew up in the city's Transcona suburb. His mother works in family services and his father is employed as a transport officer for the Canadian government. He has a younger sister. He developed an early interest in professional wrestling, with Saturday Night's Main Event among his favorite shows. He also played ice hockey as a goaltender and competed in Winnipeg's minor hockey system. After graduating from Transcona Collegiate Institute in 2001, he enrolled at the University of Manitoba but left during his first year to pursue a career in professional wrestling.

== Professional wrestling career ==
=== Early career (2000–2005) ===
Smith began training with Top Rope Championship Wrestling (TRCW), a local Winnipeg promotion run by Bobby Jay. About a year later, he made his professional debut in 2000 at age 16. Under the ring name Kenny Omega, he initially portrayed a Hawaiian surfer character; this persona was later dropped, though he retained the name.

In 2001, Omega debuted in Winnipeg promotion Premier Championship Wrestling (PCW), going on to win the PCW Heavyweight Championship in 2003 and the PCW Tag Team Championship in 2004. He unsuccessfully challenged Petey Williams for the TNA X Division Championship at the National Wrestling Alliance's 56th Anniversary Show on October 17. He later won an eight-man tournament that included Nate Hardy, Chris Sabin, and Amazing Red to win the Premier Cup and the NWA Canada X-Division Championship on June 2. After competing for Harley Race's promotion World League Wrestling in September 2005, losing to Keith Walker in a match, Omega was invited to a week-long tryout by WWE.

=== WWE (2005–2006) ===
In October 2005, Smith was sent to WWE's then-developmental territory Deep South Wrestling (DSW) for a tryout, after which he was offered a developmental contract and subsequently assigned to DSW. In August 2006, he requested his release from his contract. He recalled his time in DSW negatively, with particular criticism of Bill DeMott, Jody Hamilton, and Bob Holly, though he praised Dave Taylor. WWE was later reported to have unsuccessfully offered him a contract multiple times (once in 2014, thrice in 2015, and once in 2019).

=== Independent circuit (2008–2019) ===
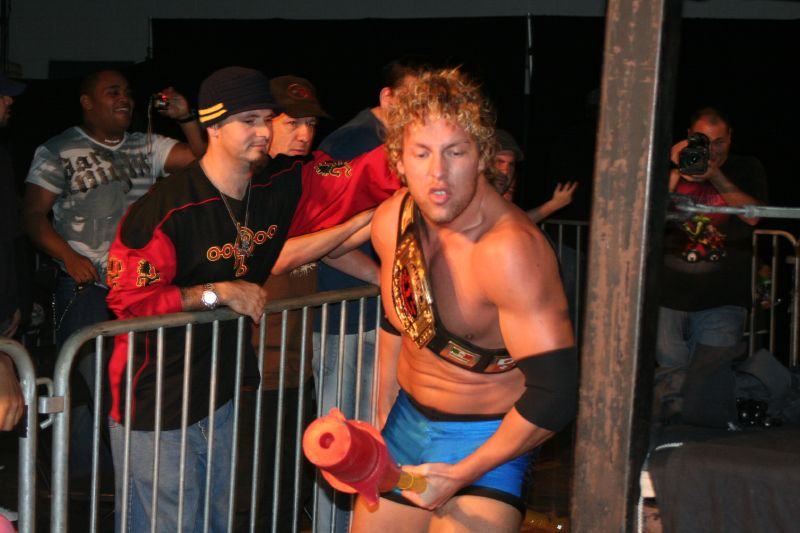
Omega as the JAPW Heavyweight Champion in November 2008

After his release from WWE, Omega intended to forge a career in mixed martial arts and entered Brazilian jiu-jitsu tournaments before deciding to return to professional wrestling. He then reinvented his wrestling persona and developed a new distinct move set. On March 8, 2008, Omega competed for Jersey All Pro Wrestling (JAPW) and captured the JAPW Heavyweight Championship by defeating Low Ki. On April 19, he retained his title against Frankie Kazarian at Spring Massacre. Omega lost the JAPW Heavyweight Championship to Jay Lethal at Jersey City Rumble on February 28, 2009.

Omega competed in a six-way elimination match for the JAPW Light Heavyweight Championship on December 10, 2010, during which he was eliminated by the eventual winner, Jushin Thunder Liger. On May 15, 2011, he defeated Liger in Philadelphia, Pennsylvania during New Japan Pro-Wrestling's inaugural US tour to win the JAPW Light Heavyweight Championship. That same year, Omega wrestled in tapings for Wrestling Revolution Project, performing under the ring name Scott Carpenter. JAPW declared the Light Heavyweight Championship vacant in September 2014. He went on to make appearances during PCW events in October 2018 and March 2019.

=== DDT Pro-Wrestling (2008–2014, 2019) ===
In 2006, Omega became captivated by Japanese wrestler Kota Ibushi after watching him perform as part of Japanese promotion DDT Pro-Wrestling, so he uploaded videos of himself having a DDT-style match to YouTube, in hopes they would interest Ibushi into working with him. After seeing the videos, DDT invited Omega to Japan to wrestle Ibushi, which Omega accepted; he made his first appearance for the promotion in August 2008. Omega stated that wrestling in Japan had been one of his dreams, as the local scene appealed to his creative side, feeling that he was able to show his personality and express himself. He and Ibushi then formed a tag team named the Golden☆Lovers.

In 2011, at the Nanae Takahashi 15th Anniversary event produced by World Wonder Ring Stardom, Omega competed in a three-minute exhibition match against a nine-year-old girl named Haruka. A video of the match went viral, making international news and receiving polarizing responses, after which Omega received death threats. Wrestler Mick Foley, conversely, praised Omega's work as a heel, asking why he was not on national television. Omega later stated that he was asked to work with Haruka due to the safe nature of his work and that he personally trained her before their match.

On December 23, Omega defeated El Generico to win the KO-D Openweight Championship for the first time. On January 27, 2013, Omega defeated Isami Kodaka in a title vs. title match, retaining his title and winning the DDT Extreme Championship held by Kodaka. He lost the KO-D Openweight Championship to Shigehiro Irie on March 20, 2013. On May 26, Omega, Ibushi, and Gota Ihashi defeated Yuji Hino, Antonio Honda, and Daisuke Sasaki to win the KO-D 6-Man Tag Team Championship. Omega's team lost the championship to Hino, Honda, and Hoshitango. On August 25, Omega lost the DDT Extreme Championship to Danshoku Dino.

On January 26, 2014, the Golden☆Lovers defeated the respective teams of Kodaka and Yuko Miyamoto as well as Konosuke Takeshita and Tetsuya Endo in a three-way match to win the KO-D Tag Team Championship. The team of the Golden☆Lovers and Sasaki won the KO-D 6-Man Tag Team Championship from Irie, Keisuke Ishii, and Soma Takao in April but lost the title to Kudo, Masa Takanashi, and Yukio Sakaguchi the following month. On September 28, the Golden☆Lovers lost the KO-D Tag Team Championship to Takeshita and Endo.

Omega returned to DDT after five years, for the promotion's Ultimate Party event on November 3, 2019, during which he and Riho scored a victory over Honda and Miyu Yamashita in a tag team match.

=== Pro Wrestling Guerrilla (2008–2014, 2017) ===
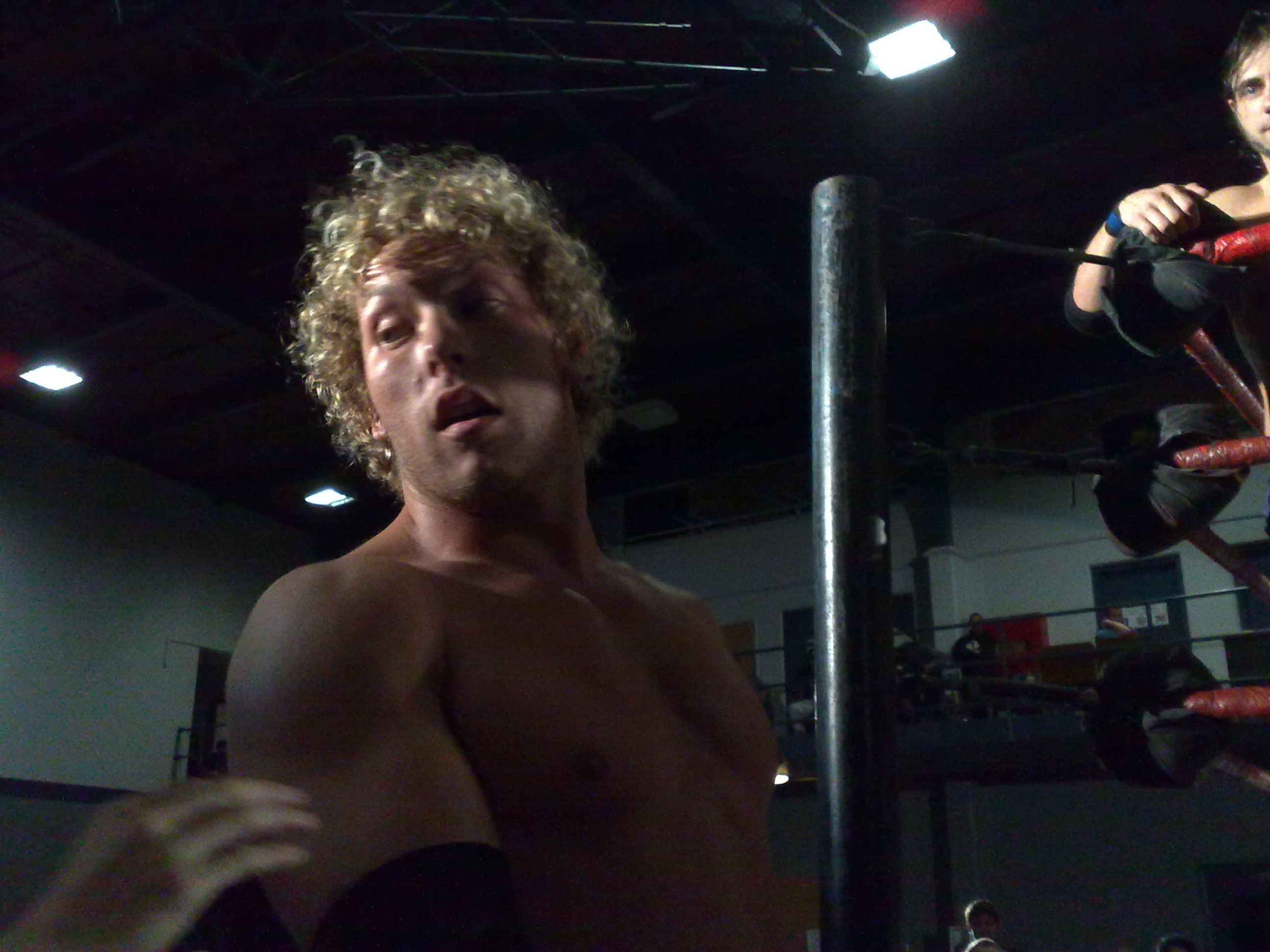
Omega during his entrance in PWG's Battle of Los Angeles in 2008

From 2008 to 2014, Omega worked for the Pro Wrestling Guerrilla (PWG) promotion. He won the 2009 Battle of Los Angeles tournament when he defeated Roderick Strong in the final round, becoming the PWG World Champion. Omega lost the championship to Davey Richards in his first defense. He also participated in the Battle of Los Angeles in 2014, which he failed to win. He returned to PWG in 2017 during the 2017 Battle of Los Angeles, teaming with The Young Bucks and defeating Flamita, Penta 0M, and Rey Fénix in a six-man tag team match.

=== Ring of Honor (2008–2009) ===
On July 25, 2008, Omega appeared for the promotion Ring of Honor (ROH), losing to Delirious in Toronto, Ontario. The following night, Omega lost to Silas Young at ROH New Horizons. The following year, he defeated Austin Aries, Jay Briscoe, and Roderick Strong in a Four-Corner Survival match. On November 14, 2009, Omega unsuccessfully challenged Aries for the ROH World Championship. At Final Battle 2009 on December 19, he competed in a Four-Corner Survival match, which was won by Claudio Castagnoli.

=== New Japan Pro-Wrestling (2010–2019) ===
==== Early appearances (2010–2013) ====
In September 2010, Omega competed for New Japan Pro-Wrestling (NJPW), losing to Prince Devitt in a match for Devitt's IWGP Junior Heavyweight Championship. On October 11, at Destruction '10, the Golden☆Lovers defeated Apollo 55 (Devitt and Ryusuke Taguchi) to win the IWGP Junior Heavyweight Tag Team Championship. On January 23, 2011, at Fantastica Mania 2011, an NJPW and Consejo Mundial de Lucha Libre co-promoted event in Tokyo, the Golden☆Lovers lost title back to Apollo 55. He also competed in the 2010 and 2011 Best of the Super Juniors tournaments.

Omega returned to NJPW in May 2013 to take part in the 2013 Best of the Super Juniors, where he managed to win five out of his eight round-robin matches, advancing to the semifinals of the tournament. On June 9, Omega was defeated in his semifinal match by Devitt, following interference from Devitt's stable, Bullet Club. A year later, he took part in New Japan's 2014 Best of the Super Juniors tournament from May 30 to June 6, finishing with a record of three wins and four losses, with a loss against Taichi on the final day, which cost him a spot in the semifinals.

==== Bullet Club and various championship reigns (2014–2017) ====
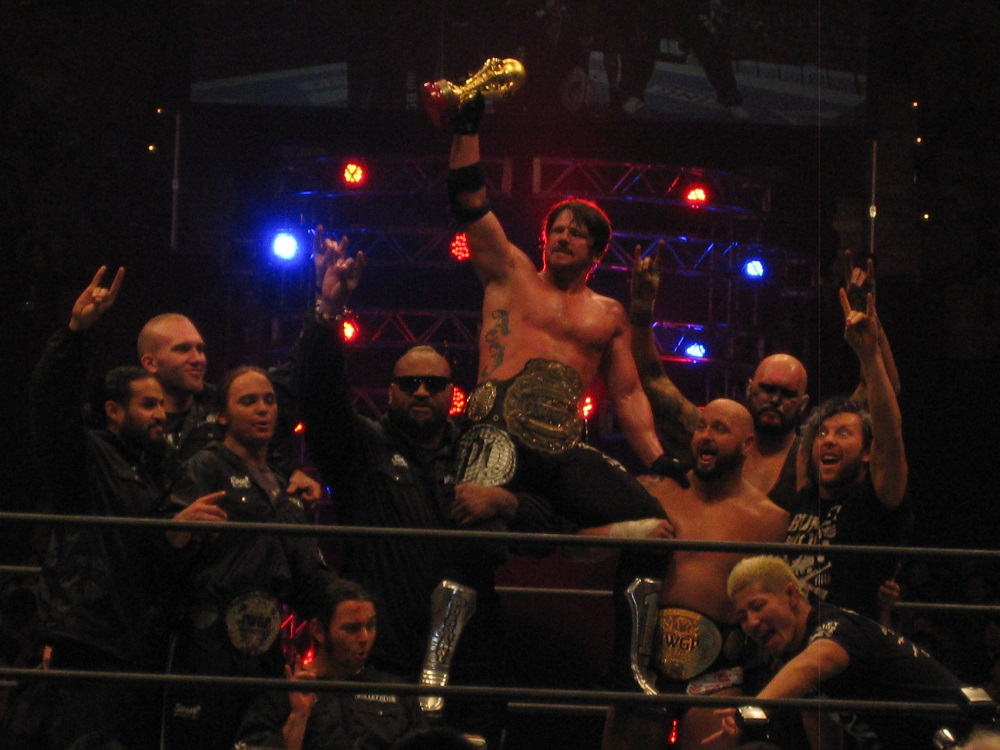
Omega (far right) as a member of Bullet Club in 2015

On October 3, 2014, NJPW held a press conference to announce that Omega was set to sign with the promotion once his DDT contract expired on October 26. Omega, dubbing himself the Cleaner, made his debut under contract on November 8 at Power Struggle, where he was revealed as the newest member of Bullet Club, despite having previously dismissed the idea of joining the villainous foreigner stable, claiming that he did not consider himself a gaijin. Omega defeated Ryusuke Taguchi to win the IWGP Junior Heavyweight Championship for the first time at Wrestle Kingdom 9 on January 4, 2015. He retained the title over Taguchi in a rematch on February 11 at The New Beginning in Osaka. In the following months, he successfully defended the title against Máscara Dorada at Invasion Attack 2015 and Alex Shelley at Wrestling Dontaku 2015.

Omega lost the title to Kushida on July 5 at Dominion 7.5 in Osaka-jo Hall. On September 23 at Destruction in Okayama, he regained the title from Kushida, following an interference from Bullet Club stablemate Karl Anderson. On January 4, 2016, Omega once again lost the title to Kushida at Wrestle Kingdom 10. The following day, Omega teamed with Bullet Club leader A.J. Styles to defeat Shinsuke Nakamura and Yoshi-Hashi in a tag team match. After the match, Bullet Club turned on Styles, with Omega taking over the leadership of the stable.

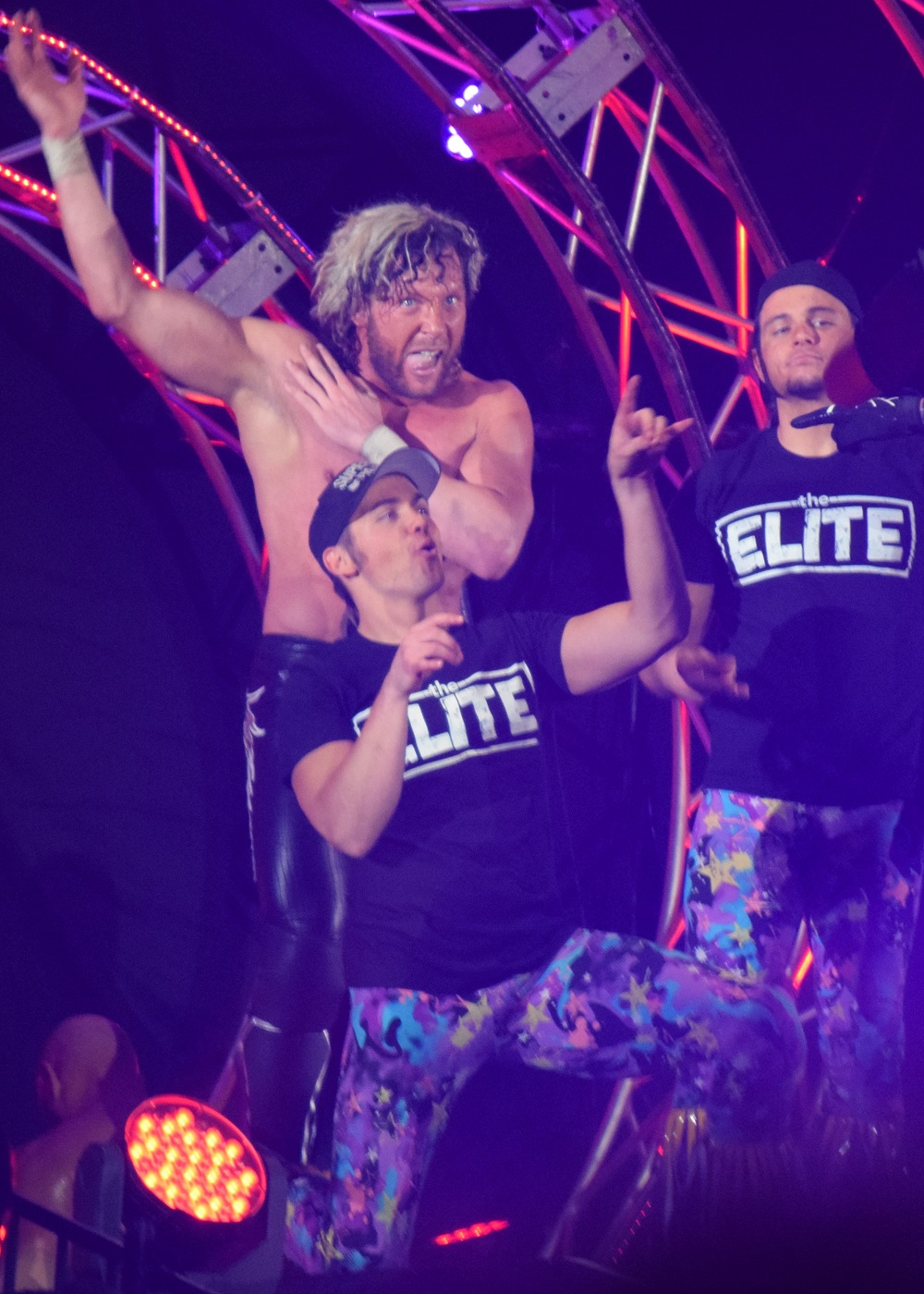
Omega alongside the Young Bucks, February 2016

At The New Beginning in Niigata on February 14, 2016, Omega defeated Hiroshi Tanahashi to win the vacant IWGP Intercontinental Championship. Six days later, he and The Young Bucks–the Bullet Club subgroup known as The Elite–won the NEVER Openweight 6-Man Tag Team Championship from The Briscoe Brothers and Toru Yano at Honor Rising: Japan 2016, an event co-produced by NJPW and ROH. That same month, Omega had signed on to become a regular competitor for ROH. The Elite lost the title to Tanahashi, Michael Elgin, and Yoshitatsu on April 10 at Invasion Attack 2016. On April 27, Omega retained the IWGP Intercontinental Championship over Elgin, which marked the first time two Canadians main evented an NJPW event. On May 3 at Wrestling Dontaku 2016, The Elite regained the NEVER Openweight 6-Man Tag Team Championship. On June 19 at Dominion 6.19 in Osaka-jo Hall, Omega lost the IWGP Intercontinental Championship to Elgin in NJPW's inaugural ladder match. On July 3, The Elite lost the NEVER Openweight 6-Man Tag Team Championship to Matt Sydal, Ricochet, and Satoshi Kojima.

From July to August, Omega took part in the 2016 G1 Climax, where he advanced to the finals after winning his block with a record of six wins and three losses. In the final round, he defeated Hirooki Goto and earned an opportunity to compete for the IWGP Heavyweight Championship. Omega not only won the tournament in his first attempt but also became the first non-Japanese G1 Climax winner in history. Towards the end of the year, despite having the opportunity to return to ROH, Omega was asked by NJPW not to take any outside bookings heading into Wrestle Kingdom 11. Due to this, Omega did not appear for ROH for the rest of 2016. He lost to IWGP Heavyweight Champion Kazuchika Okada in the main event of Wrestle Kingdom 11 on January 4, 2017. At 46 minutes and 45 seconds, the match was, at the time, the longest in the history of the January 4 Tokyo Dome Show.

==== Dissension within Bullet Club and departure (2017–2019) ====
On January 6, 2017, Omega stated that he would be "stepping away from Japan to reassess [his] future", adding that he was "weighing all options". On January 26, Omega announced on Wrestling Observer Radio that he would be flying back to Japan in February to negotiate a new deal with NJPW for "at least one more year". He returned during the first night of Honor Rising: Japan 2017 in February. Omega competed against Kazuchika Okada in a match for the IWGP Heavyweight Championship on June 11 at Dominion 6.11 in Osaka-jo Hall, which ended in a 60-minute time-limit draw. Dave Meltzer rated the match 6 1/4 stars, the highest rating he had given at the time.

Cody attacking Omega at The New Beginning in Sapporo in 2018 during their feud over Bullet Club leadership

During the G1 Special in USA in July 2017, Omega defeated Michael Elgin, Jay Lethal, and Tomohiro Ishii in an eight-man tournament to become the inaugural IWGP United States Heavyweight Champion. The event also saw signs of dissension between Omega and new Bullet Club member Cody. On August 12, Omega won his block in the 2017 G1 Climax tournament with a record of seven wins and two losses, advancing to the finals, where he was eventually defeated by Tetsuya Naito. He successfully defended his title against Juice Robinson on September 24 at Destruction in Kobe and against Yoshi-Hashi on October 15 at the NJPW and ROH-co-produced Global Wars: Chicago event.

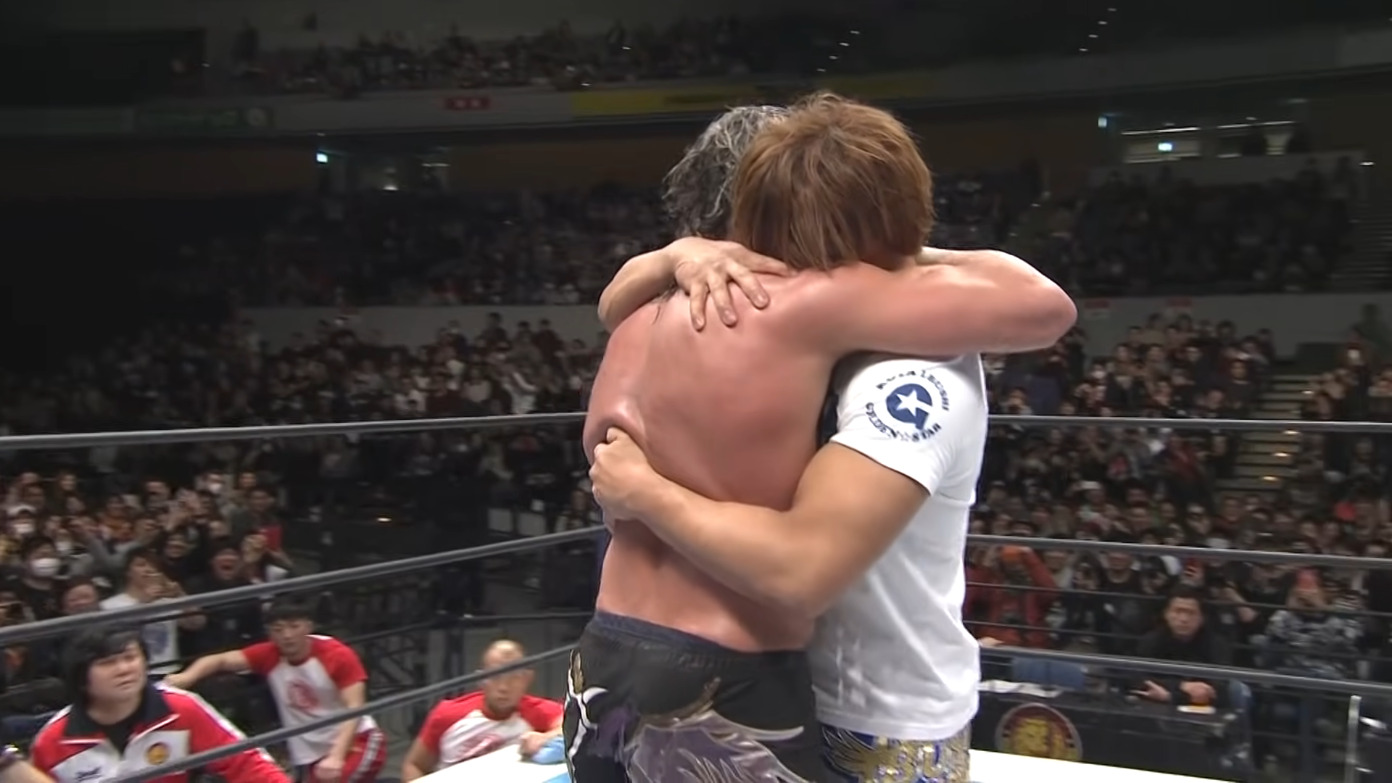
The Golden☆Lovers (Omega and Kota Ibushi) after reuniting in 2018

At Wrestle Kingdom 12 on January 4, 2018, Omega defeated the debuting Chris Jericho in a no disqualification match to retain the IWGP United States Heavyweight Championship. The bout was credited as having grown international interest in NJPW, particularly from North America. On January 28, Omega lost the title to Jay White at The New Beginning in Sapporo. After the match, Omega accepted defeat and stopped Bullet Club member Adam Page from confronting White, which brought out Cody. After months of tension over leadership of the Bullet Club faction, Cody hit Omega with a rolling cutter. When Page attempted to assist Cody in attacking Omega, Kota Ibushi returned to the ring after competing earlier in the night to save his former partner, leading to an embrace between Omega and Ibushi and a rekindling of their friendship. Omega returned to ROH for the Supercard of Honor XII event on April 7, 2018, where he lost to Cody.

On June 9, Omega defeated Okada in a two out of three falls match with no time limit for the IWGP Heavyweight Championship at Dominion 6.9 in Osaka-jo Hall, becoming the first Canadian wrestler to win the title in the process and the second wrestler to win the IWGP Junior Heavyweight and IWGP Heavyweight Championships. The match received a seven-star rating from Meltzer, which remains the highest rating ever given to a match. Omega then defeated Cody to retain his title at NJPW's G1 Special in San Francisco on July 7. Following the match, Bullet Club members Tama Tonga, Tanga Loa, Bad Luck Fale, and King Haku attacked Omega, Cody, and every other Bullet Club member who tried to aid them, forming their own branch within the stable. Omega and Cody subsequently reconciled alongside the rest of Bullet Club.

In September 2018, Omega appeared at the independent event All In, where he defeated Penta El Zero. He successfully defended the IWGP Heavyweight Championship against Ishii at Destruction later that month as well as against Cody and Ibushi in a three-way match at King of Pro-Wrestling the next month. It was revealed in October that Cody, Page, and Marty Scurll would be known alongside Omega and The Young Bucks as part of The Elite, with the group also stating that they were "no longer affiliated with Bullet Club". Pro Wrestling Illustrated named Omega the No. 1 professional wrestler of 2018 in its annual list of the top 500 male wrestlers. Omega lost the IWGP Heavyweight Championship to Hiroshi Tanahashi at Wrestle Kingdom 13 on January 4, 2019, ending his reign at 209 days. He departed NJPW after his contract expired at the end of January.

=== All Japan Pro Wrestling (2011–2012) ===
In 2011, Omega represented DDT in All Japan Pro Wrestling's 2011 Junior League, making his debut for the promotion on September 11. After three wins and two losses, he finished second in his block and did not advance to the finals.

On October 23, Omega defeated Kai to become the new World Junior Heavyweight Champion. He lost the title back to Kai on May 27, 2012, in his sixth title defense.

=== All Elite Wrestling (2019–present) ===
==== Early feuds and teaming with Adam Page (2019–2020) ====
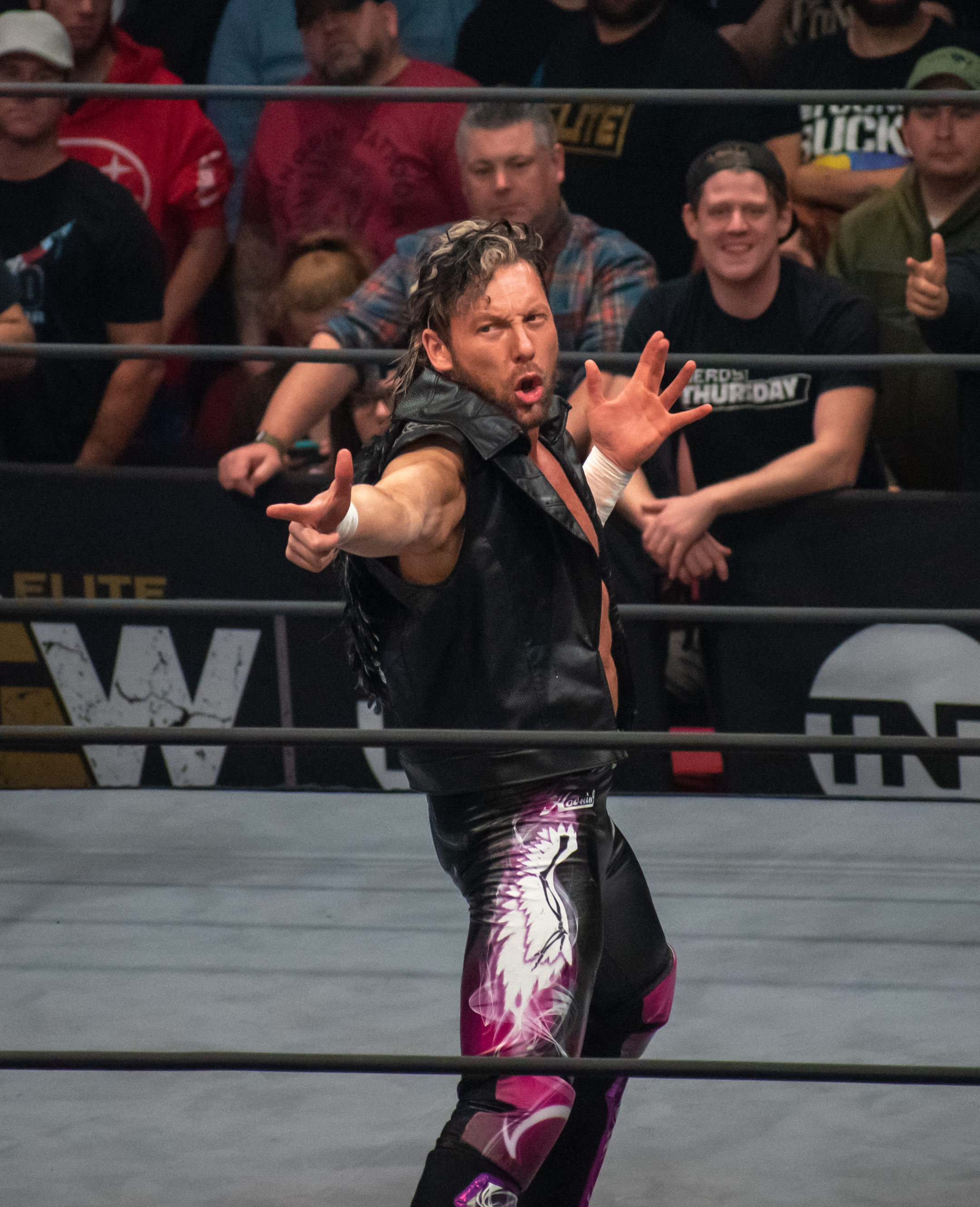
Omega appearing on an episode of Dynamite, October 2019

On February 7, 2019, Kenny Omega signed a four-year contract with the newly established All Elite Wrestling (AEW) and was named one of the promotion’s executive vice presidents. He made his AEW debut at the promotion's first pay-per-view event, Double or Nothing, on May 25, losing to Chris Jericho in the main event. After the match, Omega and Jericho were attacked by the debuting Jon Moxley. Omega was scheduled to face Moxley at All Out on August 31, but the match was canceled due to Moxley sustaining an injury. Instead, Omega faced Pac, who won the match by referee stoppage. On the October 2 premiere of Dynamite, Omega was attacked by Moxley during a six-man tag team match, leading to an unsanctioned match at Full Gear on November 9, which Omega lost.

Omega then began teaming with Adam Page. On the January 22, 2020, episode of Dynamite, held aboard Chris Jericho’s cruise, the pair defeated SoCal Uncensored (Frankie Kazarian and Scorpio Sky) to win the AEW World Tag Team Championship, marking the first title change in the promotion's history. They retained the titles at Revolution on February 29 in a match against The Young Bucks that received widespread critical acclaim. At Double or Nothing on May 23, Omega teamed with Page, The Young Bucks, and Matt Hardy to defeat The Inner Circle in the inaugural Stadium Stampede match, held at TIAA Bank Field without a live audience due to the COVID-19 pandemic. Omega and Page lost the titles to FTR at All Out on September 5, ending their reign.

==== AEW World Champion and World Trios Champion (2020–2023) ====
Following the loss, Omega returned to singles competition. He entered a tournament to determine the number one contender for the AEW World Championship, defeating Page in the finals at Full Gear on November 7. On the December 2 episode of Dynamite: Winter Is Coming, Omega defeated Jon Moxley—following interference from Don Callis—to win the AEW World Championship, thus turning heel and joining the Callis family. He retained the title against Moxley at Revolution on March 7, 2021, in an Exploding Barbed Wire Deathmatch. Omega went on to defend the title at Double or Nothing on May 30 in a triple threat match against Pac and Orange Cassidy and against Jungle Boy on the June 26 episode of Dynamite. At Fight for the Fallen On July 28, The Elite defeated Adam Page and The Dark Order, preventing Page to receive a future match for Omega's championship. At All Out on September 5, Omega successfully defended his title against Christian Cage. After the match, Adam Cole made his surprise debut, aligning himself with Omega and The Elite, only to be interrupted by the also debuting Bryan Danielson, who came to an aid of Cage and Jurassic Express. At Dynamite: Grand Slam on September 22, Omega and Danielson fought to a 30-minute time limit draw in a non-title match. His reign concluded at Full Gear on November 13, where he lost the championship to Page. Omega subsequently took time off to recover from injuries, undergoing surgeries for a sports hernia and knee issues.

Omega returned as a face on the August 17, 2022 episode of Dynamite, reuniting with The Young Bucks to compete in the AEW World Trios Championship tournament. In the finals at All Out on September 4, they defeated Page, Alex Reynolds, and John Silver to become the inaugural AEW World Trios Champions.

Following All Out, Omega and The Young Bucks were involved in a backstage altercation with CM Punk and Ace Steel, stemming from comments made by Punk during the event’s post-show media scrum. AEW President Tony Khan subsequently suspended all individuals involved and vacated both the AEW World and Trios Championships.

Omega and The Young Bucks returned to action at Full Gear on November 19, losing to Death Triangle in the first match of a best-of-seven series for the Trios titles. The series concluded on the January 11, 2023 episode of Dynamite, where Omega’s team won the seventh and final match—an Escalera De La Muerte ladder match—to reclaim the championship. They defended their titles against The Firm on the February 3 episode of Rampage, and against AR Fox and Top Flight on the February 8 episode of Dynamite and the February 17 episode of Rampage. Their second reign ended on March 5 at Revolution, where they lost the titles to the House of Black.

==== Various feuds and hiatuses (2023–2025) ====
Omega's team failed to regain the championship later that month on Dynamite, losing to the retaining House of Black in a three-way-trios match that also involved The Jericho Appreciation Society. After the match, the Blackpool Combat Club (BCC) and Page appeared and brawled, leading Omega and The Young Bucks to help Page. On May 10 on Dynamite, Omega lost to the BCC's Jon Moxley in a steel cage match after Don Callis betrayed Omega by stabbing him with a screwdriver. At Double or Nothing on May 28, Moxley, Bryan Danielson, Claudio Castagnoli, and Wheeler Yuta of the BCC defeated Omega, The Young Bucks, and Page in an Anarchy in the Arena match after interference from Callis' new client Konosuke Takeshita. On July 19 on Dynamite: Blood & Guts, the Elite, along with Kota Ibushi, defeated the Blackpool Combat Club, Konosuke Takeshita, and Pac in a Blood & Guts match. On August 2, 2023, it was announced that Omega, the Young Bucks, and Adam Page had all signed multi-year contract extensions with AEW.

On August 27 at All In, Omega, Page and Ibushi were defeated by Bullet Club Gold (Jay White and Juice Robinson) and Konosuke Takeshita in a trios match. On September 3 at All Out, Omega was defeated by Takeshita losing twice on pay per view in the span of a week - In a six man tag team match at All In and in a singles match at All Out. On October 1 at WrestleDream, Omega along with Ibushi and Chris Jericho lost to The Don Callis Family members Takeshita, Will Ospreay and Sammy Guevara. On the October 25 episode of Dynamite, Omega challenged AEW World Champion MJF to a title match on the October 28 episode of Collision which MJF accepted. Omega was unsuccessful at winning the title against MJF. On November 18 at Full Gear, Omega and Jericho, known as The Golden Jets, defeated The Young Bucks, receiving a AEW World Tag Team Championship match. On the December 5 episode of Collision he defeated Ethan Page, which would be his final match in 2023 as later in December, Omega underwent treatment to help battle problems with diverticulitis. During his absence, he was kicked from The Elite stable on the March 6 episode of Dynamite and was replaced by Kazuchika Okada and Jack Perry.

On the May 1, 2024 episode of Dynamite, Omega returned to AEW to talk about his health, informing the audience that he was lucky to be alive but would need major surgery in the future. After his address, Omega was attacked by The Elite. The following week, he would book an Anarchy in the Arena match with The Elite going up against Team AEW (Bryan Danielson, Eddie Kingston and FTR).

On December 28 at Worlds End, Omega returned after a seven-month absence, where he confronted Okada, who had just retained his AEW Continental Championship and won the 2024 Continental Classic. On the January 8, 2025 episode of Dynamite, Omega appeared to address the fans before he was attacked by Don Callis Family members Brian Cage, Kyle Fletcher, and Lance Archer, only to be saved by former rival Will Ospreay. On February 15 at Grand Slam Australia, Omega and Ospreay defeated Fletcher and Konosuke Takeshita in a tag team match.

==== Championship reigns (2025–present) ====
Omega during his second reign as the AEW World Champion in August 2026.

At Revolution on March 9, 2025, Omega defeated Konosuke Takeshita to win the AEW International Championship for the first time. As a result, he became recognized as the first-ever AEW Grand Slam Champion for holding AEW's World, Tag Team, Trios, and International Championships. On April 6 at Dynasty, Omega successfully defended his title against "Speedball" Mike Bailey and Ricochet in a three-way match. On May 25 at Double or Nothing, Omega teamed with Swerve Strickland, Willow Nightingale, and The Opps (Samoa Joe, Powerhouse Hobbs, and Katsuyori Shibata) to defeat the Death Riders (Jon Moxley, Claudio Castagnoli, Marina Shafir, and Wheeler Yuta) and The Young Bucks in an Anarchy in the Arena match. At Fyter Fest on June 4, Omega was confronted by Okada, leading Winner Takes All Championship Unification match at All In on July 12, where the winner would be crowned the inaugural AEW Unified Champion. On July 2 at Dynamite 300, Omega came to the aid of Ibushi from an attack by Okada and the Don Callis Family, reuniting the Golden Lovers. On July 12 at All In, Omega was defeated by Okada, ending his reign at 125 days. On August 24 at Forbidden Door, the Golden Lovers teamed with Darby Allin, Hiroshi Tanahashi, and Will Ospreay to defeat the Death Riders, The Young Bucks, and Gabe Kidd a lights out steel cage match. At Full Gear on November 22, Omega teamed with Jurassic Express ("Jungle" Jack Perry and Luchasaurus), losing to the Young Bucks and Josh Alexander; post-match, Alexander and the Don Callis Family (Rocky Romero, Mark Davis, El Clon and Hechicero) attacked Omega and Jurassic Express until the Young Bucks returned to aid them. Omega and The Young Bucks then embraced, reuniting the original trio of The Elite.

On the February 4, 2026 episode of Dynamite, Omega faced Andrade El Idolo for the right to advance to a number one contender's match for a world title shot at Grand Slam Australia, but failed to win after Swerve Strickland unintentionally distracted the referee. This led to a match between the two on the February 18 episode of Dynamite, where Omega was defeated and attacked by Strickland after the match. Omega defeated Strickland in a rematch on the March 25 episode of Dynamite to become the new number one contender for the AEW World Championship. On April 12 at Dynasty, Omega failed to defeat MJF for the world title, but in a rematch at Dynamite: Beach Break on July 8, Omega defeated MJF in a Last Chance match to win his second AEW World Championship. During his 53-day second reign, Omega successfully defended his title at Redemption on July 26 against Kevin Knight, before losing it at All In on August 30 to Will Ospreay.

=== Lucha Libre AAA Worldwide (2019–2021, 2023) ===
In 2019, AEW announced a partnership with Lucha Libre AAA Worldwide, and Omega made his debut for the latter promotion at its Triplemanía XXVII event, teaming with Matt and Nick Jackson in a losing effort against Fénix, Pentagón Jr., and Laredo Kid. At Héroes Inmortales XIII in October, Omega won the AAA Mega Championship from Fénix. He retained the title against Dragon Lee at Triplemanía Regia in December and against Laredo Kid at Triplemanía XXVIII the following year. He defeated Andrade El Idolo to remain the AAA Mega Champion at Triplemanía XXIX in August 2021. In November, Omega vacated the AAA Mega Championship due to injuries, ending his reign as the title's longest-reigning holder. In 2023, Omega faced the AAA Mega Champion El Hijo del Vikingo for the title at Triplemanía XXXI: Tijuana, but was defeated by the champion.

=== Impact Wrestling (2020–2021) ===
On the December 8 episode of its program, Impact!, Omega made his Impact Wrestling debut, appearing in a segment with Don Callis. At the Hard To Kill pay-per-view in January 2021, he competed for the promotion, teaming with fellow former Bullet Club stablemates Karl Anderson and Doc Gallows to defeat Rich Swann, Chris Sabin, and Moose.

At Impact Wrestling's Rebellion pay-per-view in April 2021, Omega defeated Swann in a Winner Takes All match to retain his AEW World Championship and also win the Impact World Championship. At Slammiversary, Omega defeated Sami Callihan in a no disqualification match to retain the Impact World Championship. On August 13, at the premiere episode of Rampage, he lost the Impact World Championship to Christian Cage.

=== Return to NJPW (2022–present) ===
In November 2022 at Historic X-Over, Omega returned to New Japan Pro-Wrestling via a video message, challenging IWGP United States Heavyweight Champion Will Ospreay, to a match for the title at Wrestle Kingdom 17. At the event, Omega defeated Ospreay, winning the title for the second time. He dropped the title back to Ospreay at Forbidden Door in June after interference from Callis. In November 2024 at Power Struggle, Omega returned to NJPW, and announced his intentions to a make his in-ring return at Wrestle Dynasty on January 5, 2025. He would be then be confronted backstage by Gabe Kidd, which led to a brawl between the two. At the event, Omega defeated Kidd.

On January 4, 2026, Wrestle Kingdom 20, Omega made a surprise appearance as part of the retirement ceremony for Hiroshi Tanahashi. On October 12, at King of Pro-Wrestling, Omega attacked Boltin Oleg and Yota Tsuji. At Power Struggle on November 3, Omega defeated Tsuji and Oleg in a three-way match to earn an IWGP Heavyweight Championship match against Tsuji at Wrestle Kingdom 21.

== Professional wrestling style and persona ==
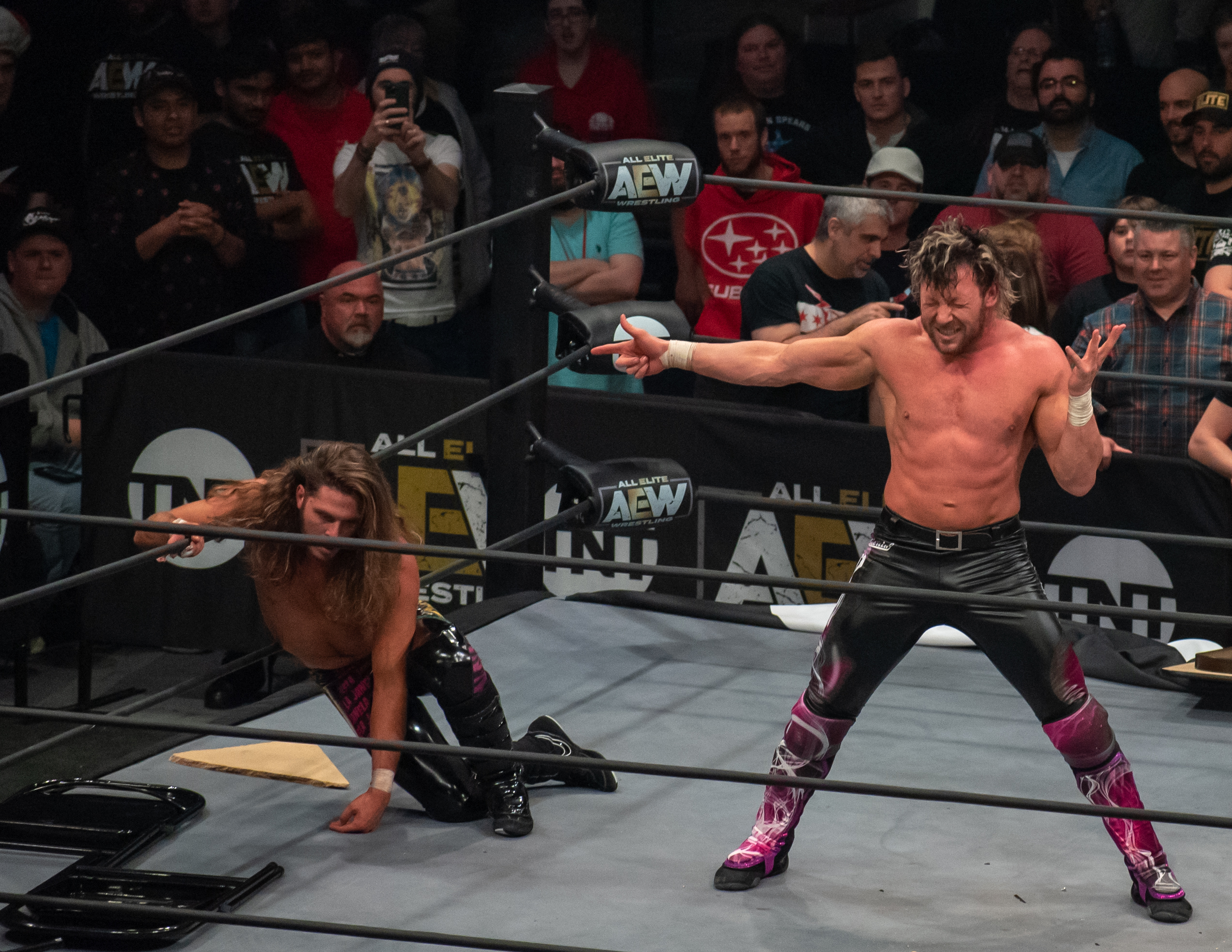
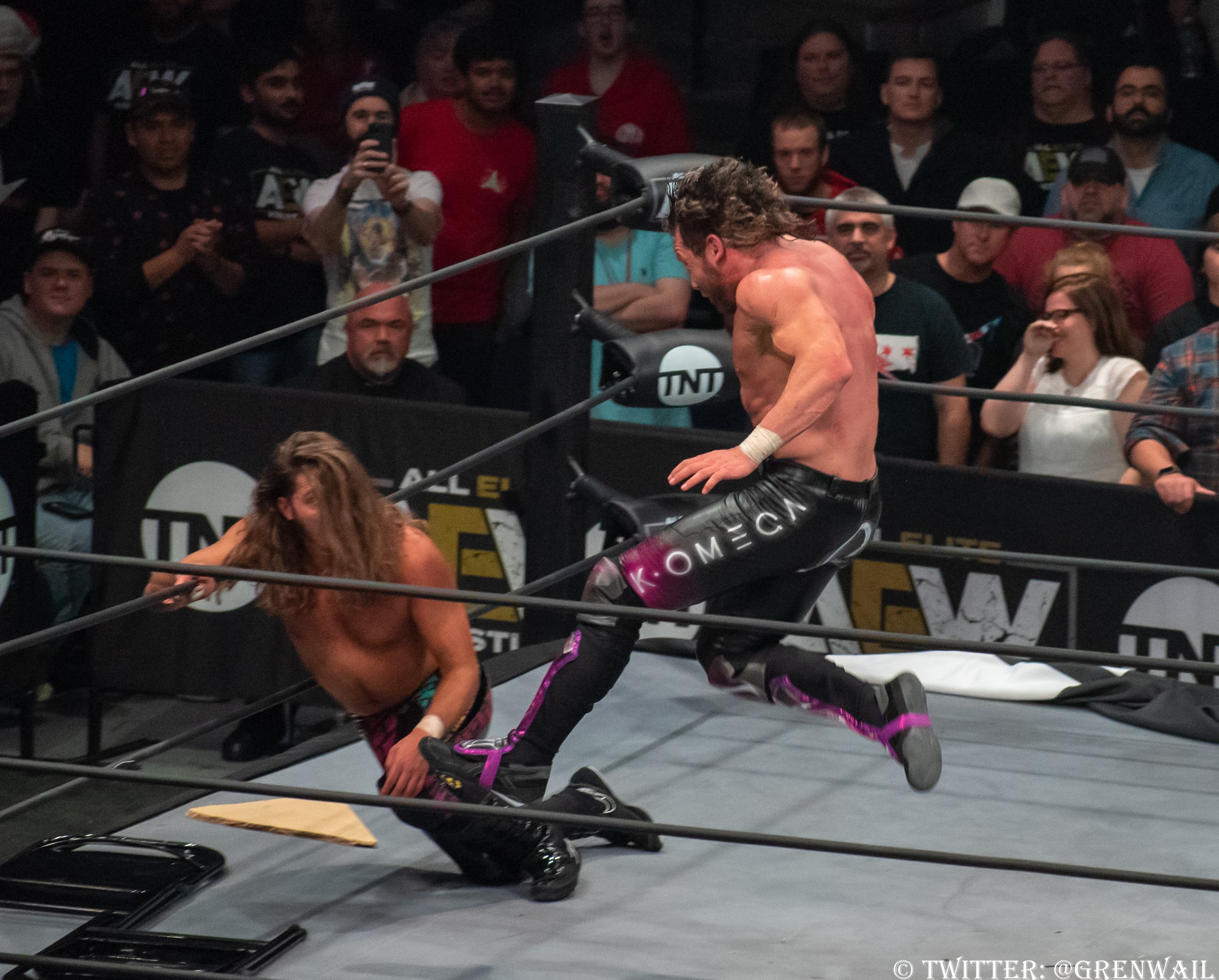
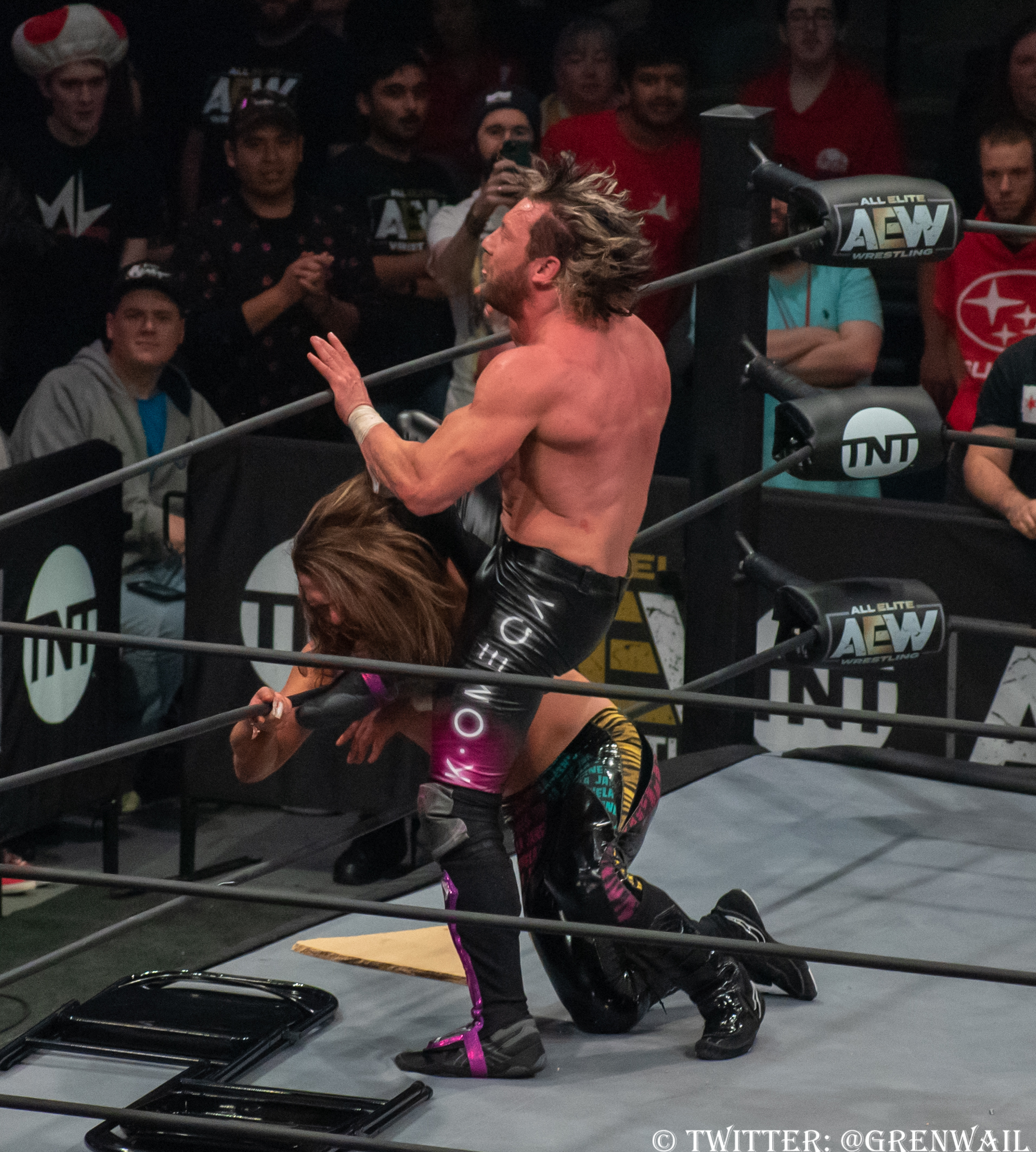
Omega performing the V-Trigger running knee strike on Joey Janela

A fan of video games, Smith incorporates ideas from the medium into wrestling maneuvers, entrance music, and gimmick concepts. The Kenny Omega ring name was originally inspired by the character Omega Weapon from the Final Fantasy video game series. He named his finishing maneuver the One-Winged Angel (a reference to Final Fantasy VII character Sephiroth) and the running knee strike he employs as a signature maneuver the V-Trigger (a technique used in Street Fighter V); integrated the Hadouken attack from the Street Fighter video game series as a signature move; and used of variations of Mega Man antagonist Dr. Wily's theme music as entrance themes. The One-Winged Angel has been highly protected; with the only wrestlers to ever kick out of it being Kota Ibushi in 2012 and Will Ospreay in 2026; MJF also kicked out of the move earlier in 2026, though this came after a long count. For his final appearance as an NJPW-contracted wrestler at Wrestle Kingdom 13, Smith collaborated with Undertale creator Toby Fox to create a custom entrance video in the style of the game, and for his 2025 return from a life-threatening illness, worked with Final Fantasy soundtrack composers Nobuo Uematsu and Masayoshi Soken to create a new entrance theme. In addition to video games, Smith also draws inspiration from the television show Star Trek: The Next Generation and superhero cartoons to develop elements of his in-ring persona. At Fyter Fest in June 2019, Smith also donned ring gear that references the character Akuma from the Street Fighter series.

During his run in Bullet Club, Smith did his interviews entirely in English, refusing to speak Japanese. In an interview, he stated that he was told that his otaku gimmick was "too bubbly" for Bullet Club, which led to him adopting the Cleaner nickname as a reference to people who clean up crime scenes. Smith cited the character Albert Wesker from the Resident Evil video game series as well as Sylvester Stallone's character, Marion "Cobra" Cobretti, from the film Cobra as inspirations for the Cleaner gimmick. Although Smith originally intended to embody the gimmick straightforwardly, he later integrated comedy into the persona as a response to people who thought he was portraying a janitor, doing so by coming out for his matches holding a mop and a broom.

Over the course of their careers, the relationship between Omega and his Golden☆Lovers tag team partner Kota Ibushi has been portrayed with romantic undertones. On the partnership, Omega stated in 2018: "Let people think what they want to think. If LGBT people can identify with our story, ... I'm good with that." Omega and Ibushi's partnership was chronicled in the 2019 documentary Omega Man: A Wrestling Love Story. Omega strives for inclusivity within professional wrestling and believes that "it's important to show in the 21st century that [LGBT people] should feel just as welcome to be a wrestling fan as anyone else".

== Other media ==
BanG Dream! Girls Band Party!'s trailer by Kenny Omega

In 2018, during his time with NJPW, Smith starred in a series of trailers for the mobile game BanG Dream! Girls Band Party!. Both properties were owned by Bushiroad at that time. Smith was unfamiliar with the BanG Dream! franchise at the time, but agreed to the commercials since he liked playing rhythm games. He became a fan of the series and particularly the band Roselia while playing the game to prepare for the ads.

== Personal life ==
Smith considers himself straight edge as he avoids the recreational use of alcohol and drugs. He began suffering from vertigo in 2018, and adapted to his diagnosis by practising in a custom wrestling ring designed to spin. He is close friends with his former tag team partner Michael Nakazawa.

Smith resided in the Katsushika ward of Tokyo and is fluent in Japanese. He said in October 2016 that he "loved Japanese culture before even realizing it was, in fact, Japanese culture" and that his favorite video games and cartoons were Japanese. He has since acquired Japanese citizenship. Regarding his personal life, he said in 2016 that he had no time to think about relationships because he was so focused on wrestling.

An avid gamer, Smith hosted a YouTube series called Cleaner's Corner, in which he played some of his favorite video games. In June 2016, he made a guest appearance at Community Effort Orlando, defeating WWE wrestler Xavier Woods in a game of Street Fighter V. The two often appear at video game conventions together, with Omega also dressing as Sans for an episode of AEW Dynamite on October 30, 2019. He portrayed the character Cody Travers in a live-action portion of a trailer for Street Fighter V: Arcade Edition in 2018, voiced a fictionalized version of himself in an episode of the animated series Captain Laserhawk: A Blood Dragon Remix (2023), and performed the motion capture for Alex in Street Fighter 6 (2023), including the One-Winged Angel.

== Mixed martial arts record ==
Professional record breakdown
7 matches	4 wins	3 losses
By knockout	3	1
By submission	1	2

Res.	Record	Opponent	Method	Event	Date	Round	Time	Location	Notes
Loss	4–3	Brett Jensen	Submission	UCE: Round 32 - Episode 2	July 18, 2008	1	0:42	Salt Lake City, Utah, United States	
Loss	4–2	Travis Fulton	TKO (punches)	CVFA: Return of the Champions	April 28, 2007	1	1:24	Iowa, United States	
Win	4–1	Clayton Swanson	KO (punch)	Whiskey Junction Beatdown 8	February 22, 2007	1	0:42	Minneapolis, Minnesota, United States	
Win	3–1	Larry Zykstra	Submission (rear-naked choke)	Whiskey Junction Beatdown 4	February 8, 2007	1	1:43	Minneapolis, Minnesota, United States	
Win	2–1	Jeremy Homan	TKO (submission to punches)	Whiskey Junction Beatdown 3	February 1, 2007	1	0:24	Minneapolis, Minnesota, United States	
Win	1–1	Mark Cantrell	TKO (punches)	Whiskey Junction Beatdown 3	February 1, 2007	1	1:43	Minneapolis, Minnesota, United States	
Loss	0–1	Dan Severn	Submission	Action Wrestling Entertainment	October 5, 2005	1	4:12	Canada	

== Championships and accomplishments ==
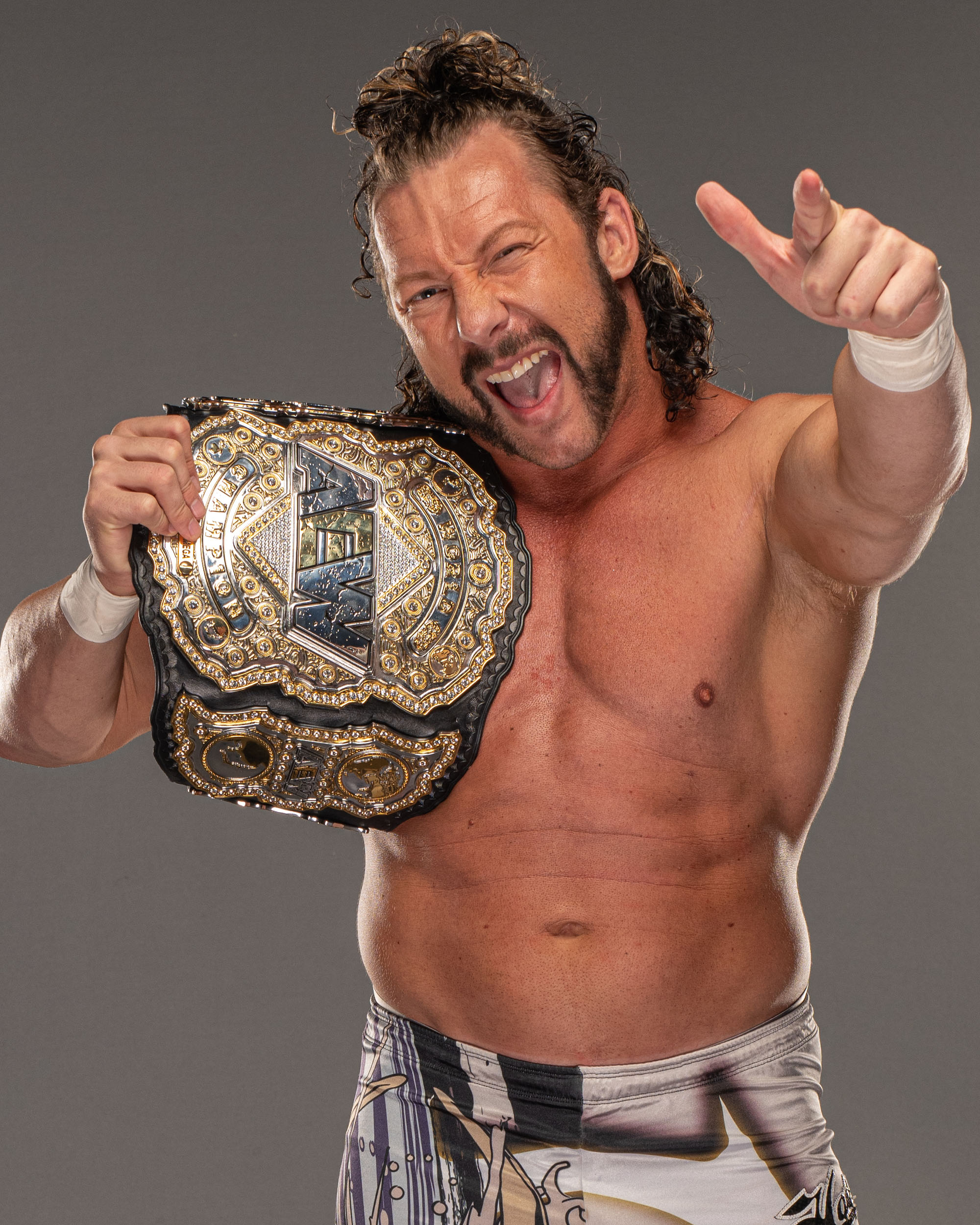
Omega is a two-time AEW World Champion

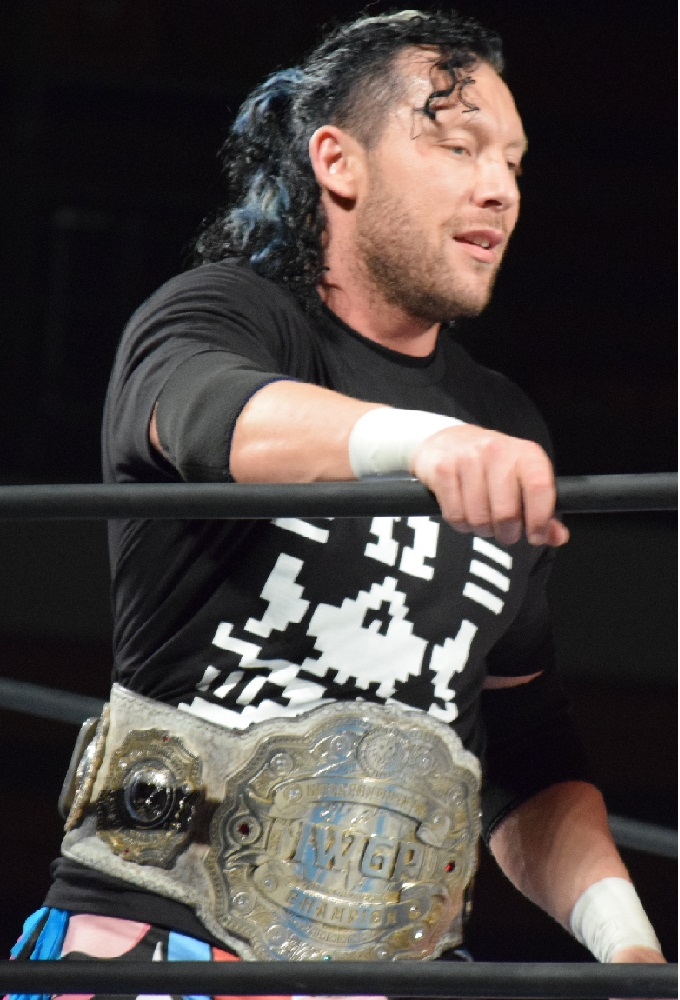
As part of New Japan Pro-Wrestling, he was an IWGP Intercontinental Champion...

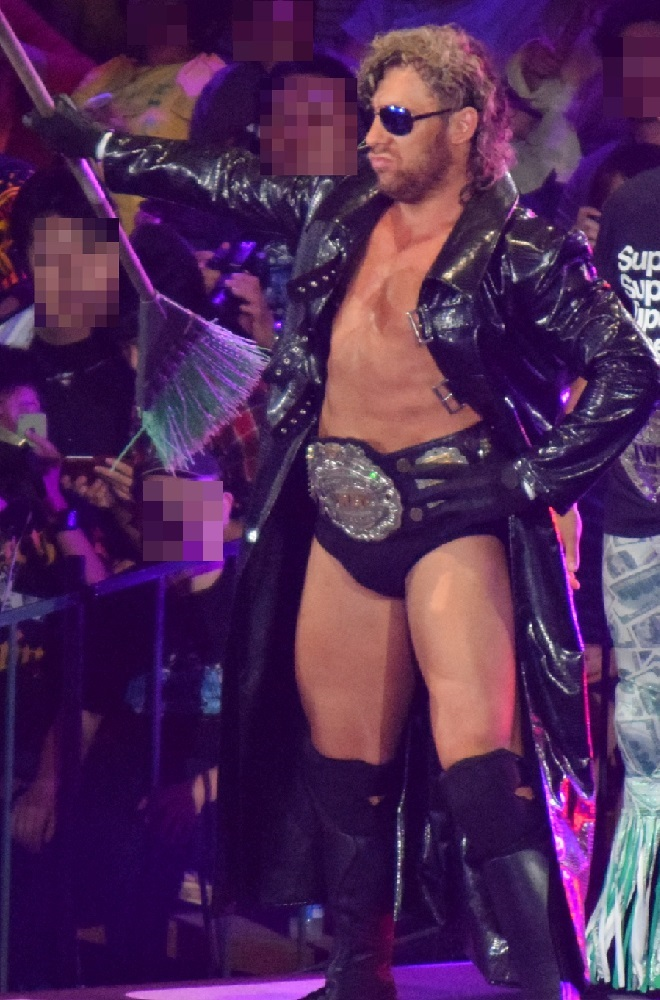
...a two-time IWGP Junior Heavyweight Champion...

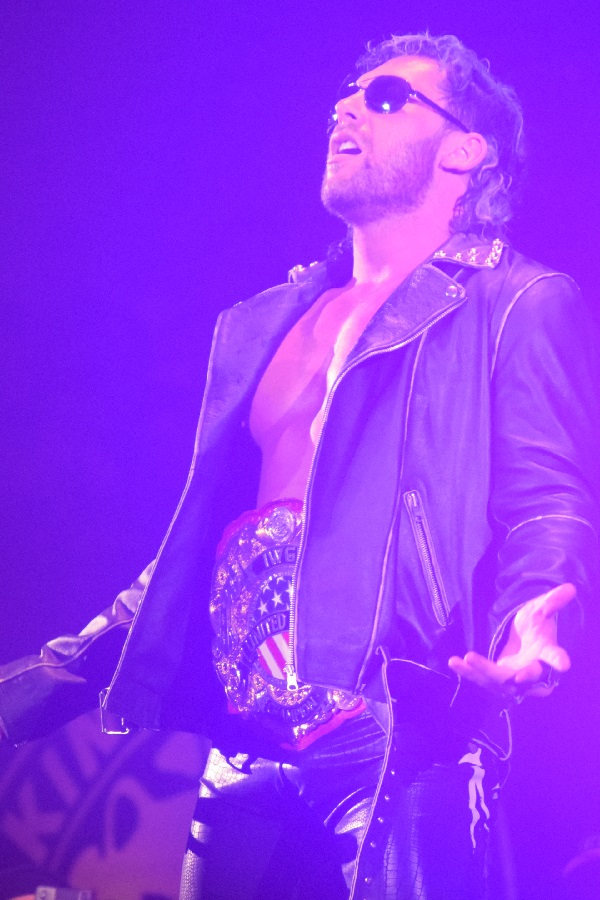
...and the inaugural and two-time IWGP United States Champion.

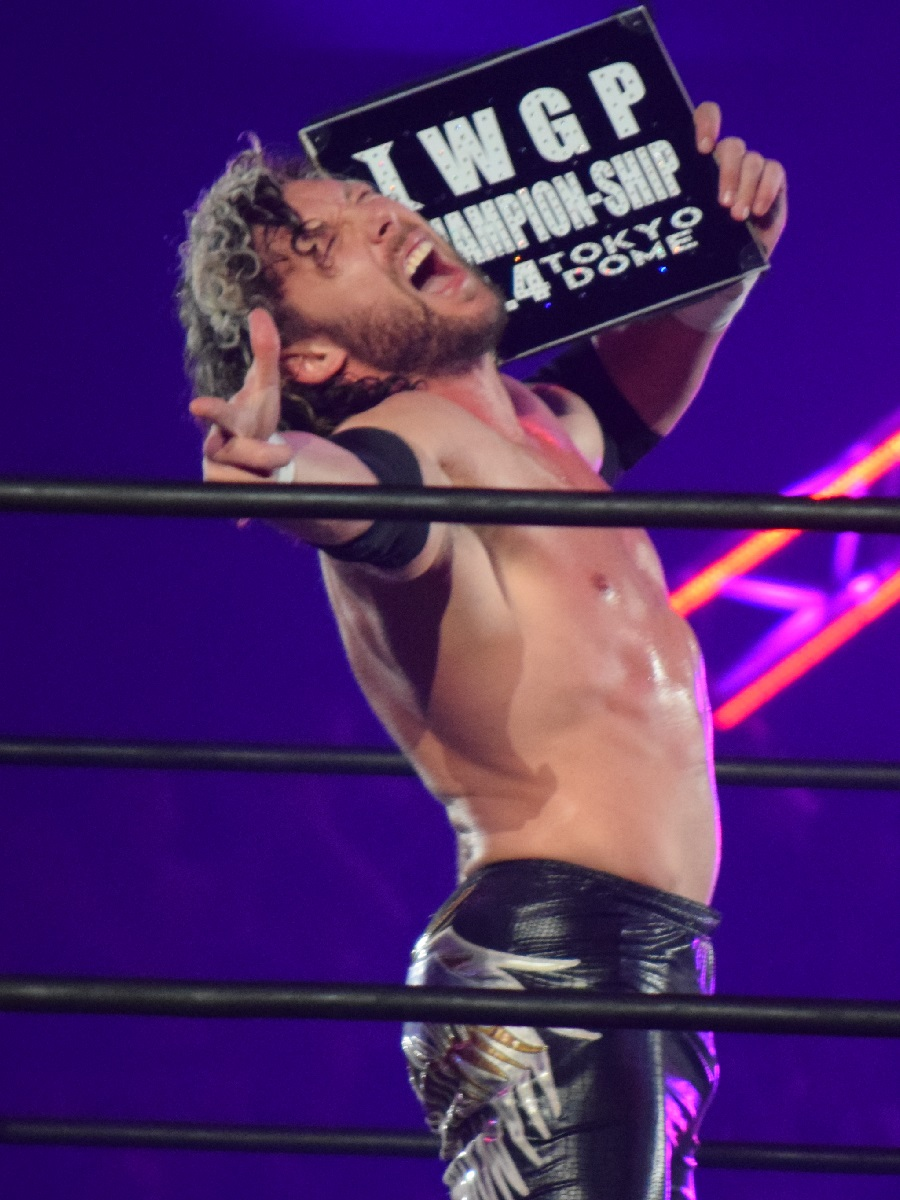
Omega is the first gaijin wrestler to win the G1 Climax tournament.

- 4 Front Wrestling
  - 4FW Junior Heavyweight Championship (1 time)
- All Elite Wrestling
  - AEW World Championship (2 times)
  - AEW International Championship (1 time)
  - AEW World Tag Team Championship (1 time) – with Adam Page
  - AEW World Trios Championship (2 times, inaugural) – with The Young Bucks
  - First AEW Triple Crown Champion
  - First AEW Grand Slam Champion
  - AEW World Championship Eliminator Tournament (2020)
  - AEW World Trios Championship Tournament (2022) – with The Young Bucks
  - AEW International Championship Tournament (2025)
  - AEW Dynamite Awards (3 times)
    - Bleacher Report PPV Moment of the Year (2021) with The Elite vs. The Inner Circle at Double or Nothing
    - Biggest WTF Moment (2021) – winning the AEW World Championship and walking out of AEW at Winter Is Coming
    - Wrestler of the Year (2022)
- All Japan Pro Wrestling
  - World Junior Heavyweight Championship (1 time)
- Canadian Wrestling's Elite
  - Canadian Unified Junior Heavyweight Championship (3 times)
  - CWE Tag Team Championship (1 time) – with Danny Duggan
  - CWE Tag Team Title Tournament (2010) – with Danny Duggan
- Canadian Wrestling Federation
  - CWF Heavyweight Championship (1 time)
- CBS Sports
  - Match of the Year (2018) vs. Kazuchika Okada on Dominion 6.9 in Osaka-jo Hall
- DDT Pro-Wrestling
  - DDT Extreme Championship (1 time)
  - KO-D 6-Man Tag Team Championship (2 times) – with Gota Ihashi and Kota Ibushi (1), and Daisuke Sasaki and Kota Ibushi (1)
  - KO-D Openweight Championship (1 time)
  - KO-D Tag Team Championship (3 times) – with Kota Ibushi (2) and Michael Nakazawa (1)
  - Sea of Japan 6-Person Tag Team Championship (1 time) – with Mr. #6 and Riho
  - King of DDT Tournament (2012)
  - Best Match Award (2012) vs. Kota Ibushi on August 18
- ESPN
  - Match of the Year (2023) – vs. Will Ospreay (tie between their matches at Wrestle Kingdom 17 and Forbidden Door)
- Impact Wrestling
  - Impact World Championship (1 time)
- Japan Indie Awards
  - Best Bout Award (2008) vs. Kota Ibushi at Beer Garden Pro Wrestling
  - Best Bout Award (2012) vs. Kota Ibushi at Budokan Peter Pan
  - Best Bout Award (2014) with Kota Ibushi vs. Konosuke Takeshita and Tetsuya Endo at Dramatic General Election
- Jersey All Pro Wrestling
  - JAPW Heavyweight Championship (1 time)
  - JAPW Light Heavyweight Championship (1 time)
- Lucha Libre AAA Worldwide
  - AAA Mega Championship (1 time)
- Maple Leaf Pro Wrestling
  - PWA Champions Grail (Wrestling Retribution Project 2011, revived in 2024)
- New Japan Pro-Wrestling
  - IWGP Heavyweight Championship (1 time)
  - IWGP Intercontinental Championship (1 time)
  - IWGP Junior Heavyweight Championship (2 times)
  - IWGP Junior Heavyweight Tag Team Championship (1 time) – with Kota Ibushi
  - IWGP United States Heavyweight Championship (2 times, inaugural)
  - NEVER Openweight 6-Man Tag Team Championship (2 times) – with The Young Bucks
  - G1 Climax (2016)
  - IWGP United States Championship Tournament (2017)
  - New Japan Pro-Wrestling Best Bout (2016) vs. Tetsuya Naito at G1 Climax 26
  - New Japan Pro-Wrestling Best Bout (2017) vs. Kazuchika Okada at Dominion 6.11 in Osaka-jo Hall
  - New Japan Pro-Wrestling MVP (2017)
- New York Post
  - Match of the Year (2023) vs. Will Ospreay at Wrestle Kingdom 17
- Nikkan Sports
  - Match of the Year Award (2016) vs. Tetsuya Naito at G1 Climax 26
  - Match of the Year Award (2017) vs. Kazuchika Okada at Wrestle Kingdom 11
  - Match of the Year Award (2018) vs. Kazuchika Okada at Dominion 6.9 in Osaka-jo Hall
  - Match of the Year Award (2023) vs. Will Ospreay at Wrestle Kingdom 17
  - Best Tag Team Award (2010) with Kota Ibushi
- Premier Championship Wrestling
  - NWA Canadian X-Division Championship (1 time)
  - PCW Heavyweight Championship (4 times)
  - PCW Kenny Omega One Real World Heavyweight Championship (1 time, inaugural)
  - PCW Tag Team Championship (4 times) – with Rawskillz (1) and Chris Stevens (3)
  - Premier Cup (2005, 2007)
- Pro Wrestling Guerrilla
  - PWG World Championship (1 time)
  - Battle of Los Angeles (2009)
- Pro Wrestling Illustrated
  - Ranked No. 1 of the top 500 male singles wrestlers in the PWI 500 in 2018 and 2021
  - Ranked No. 2 of the top 50 tag teams in the PWI Tag Team 50 in 2020 with Adam Page
  - Feud of the Decade (2010s) vs. Kazuchika Okada
  - Feud of the Year (2017) vs. Kazuchika Okada
  - Match of the Year (2017) vs. Kazuchika Okada at Wrestle Kingdom 11
  - Match of the Year (2018) vs. Kazuchika Okada at Dominion 6.9 in Osaka-jo Hall
  - Match of the Year (2020) with Adam Page vs. The Young Bucks at Revolution
  - Wrestler of the Year (2021)
- Ring of Honor
  - ROH Year-End Award (1 time)
    - Feud of the Year (2018) vs. Cody
- SoCal Uncensored
  - Match of the Year (2017) vs. Tomohiro Ishii at G1 Special in USA
  - Match of the Year (2018) with Kota Ibushi vs. The Young Bucks at Strong Style Evolved
- Sports Illustrated
  - Wrestler of the Year (2017)
- Tokyo Sports
  - Best Bout Award (2010) with Kota Ibushi vs. Prince Devitt and Ryusuke Taguchi at Destruction '10
  - Best Bout Award (2017) vs. Kazuchika Okada at Wrestle Kingdom 11
  - Best Bout Award (2018) vs. Kazuchika Okada at Dominion 6.9 in Osaka-jo Hall
  - Technique Award (2016)
- Top Rope Championship Wrestling
  - TRCW Tag Team Championship (1 time) - with Ronnie Attitude
- Weekly Pro Wrestling
  - Best Bout Award (2010) with Kota Ibushi vs. Prince Devitt and Ryusuke Taguchi at Destruction '10
  - Best Bout Award (2016) vs. Tetsuya Naito at G1 Climax 26
  - Best Bout Award (2017) vs. Kazuchika Okada at Wrestle Kingdom 11
  - Best Foreigner Award (2016–2018)
  - Best Tag Team Award (2010) with Kota Ibushi
- Wrestling Observer Newsletter
  - Wrestling Observer Newsletter Hall of Fame (Class of 2020)
  - Best Wrestling Maneuver (2016–2018, 2020) One-Winged Angel
  - Feud of the Year (2017) vs. Kazuchika Okada
  - Feud of the Year (2021) vs. Adam Page
  - Japan MVP (2018)
  - Most Outstanding Wrestler (2018, 2020)
  - Pro Wrestling Match of the Year (2017) vs. Kazuchika Okada at Wrestle Kingdom 11
  - Pro Wrestling Match of the Year (2018) vs. Kazuchika Okada at Dominion 6.9 in Osaka-jo Hall
  - Pro Wrestling Match of the Year (2020) with Adam Page vs. The Young Bucks at Revolution
  - Pro Wrestling Match of the Year (2023) vs. Will Ospreay at Wrestle Kingdom 17
  - Pro Wrestling Match of the Year (2025) vs. Gabe Kidd at Wrestle Dynasty
  - United States/Canada MVP (2021)
  - Wrestler of the Year (2018, 2021)
