= Cody Rhodes =

American professional wrestler (born 1985)

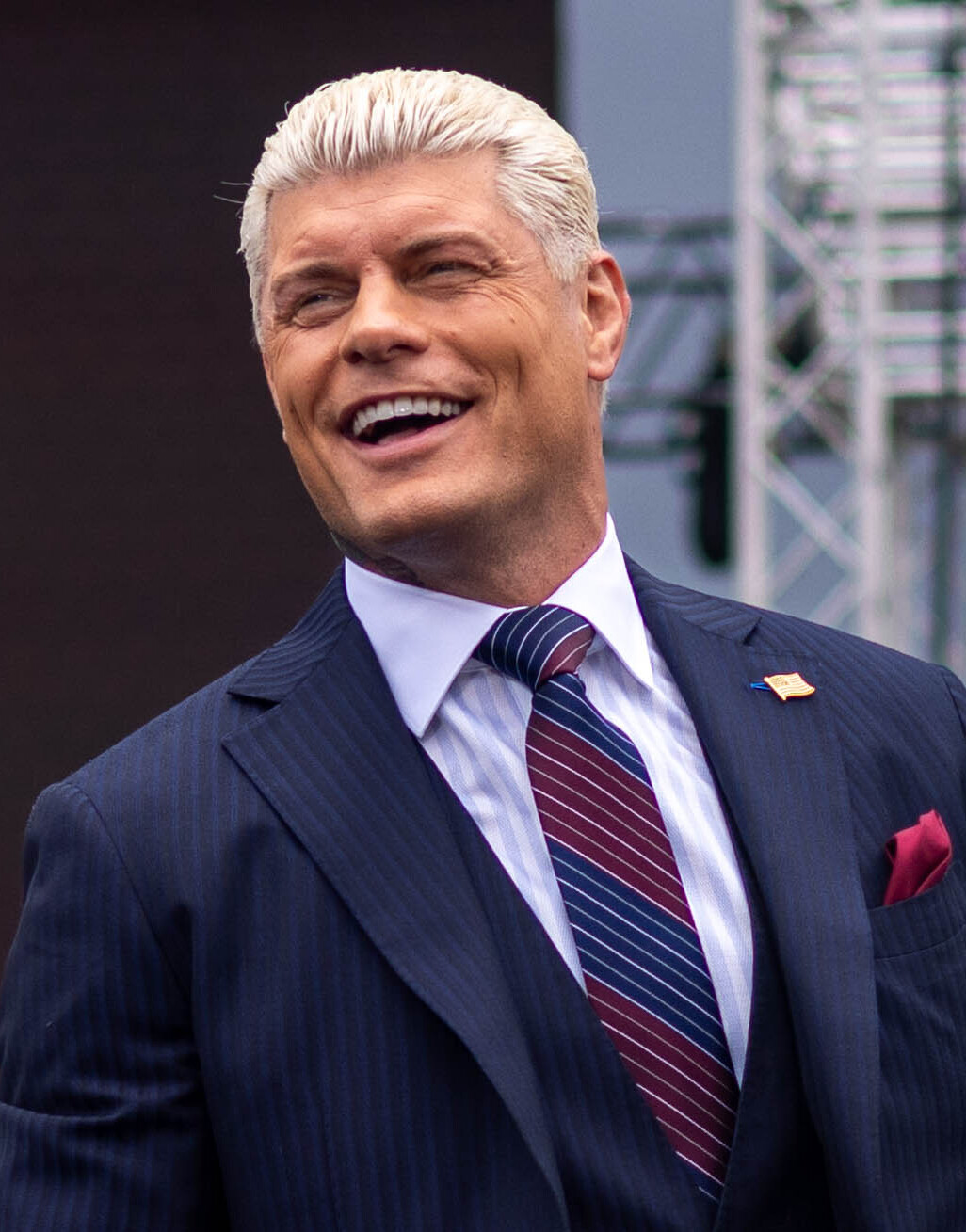
- Rhodes in 2025
- Born: Cody Garrett Runnels; June 30, 1985 (age 41); Charlotte, North Carolina, U.S.
- Spouse: Brandi Rhodes (m. 2013)
- Children: 2
- Father: Dusty Rhodes
- Relatives: Dustin Rhodes (half-brother); Fred Ottman (uncle); Jerry Sags (uncle)
- Professional wrestling career
- Ring name(s): Cody; Cody R Cody Rhodes; Cody Runnels; Fuego 2 Stardust
- Billed height: 6 ft 2 in (188 cm)
- Billed weight: 222 lb (101 kg)
- Billed from: Atlanta, Georgia; Charlotte, North Carolina; The Fifth Dimension; Marietta, Georgia
- Trained by: Al Snow; Danny Davis; Dusty Rhodes; Dustin Rhodes; Randy Orton; Ricky Morton; Shawn Spears
- Debut: June 16, 2006

YouTube information
- Channel: What Do You Wanna Talk About? With Cody Rhodes
- Years active: 2025–present
- Genre: Professional wrestling
- Subscribers: 320 thousand
- Views: 80.9 million
- Last updated: October 18, 2026

Cody Garrett Runnels Rhodes (born Cody Garrett Runnels; June 30, 1985) is an American professional wrestler. As of April 2022, he is signed to WWE, where he performs on the SmackDown brand. Rhodes co-founded All Elite Wrestling (AEW), where he served as an executive vice president and wrestler from 2019 to 2022.

The son of Dusty Rhodes and half-brother of Dustin Rhodes, Rhodes won two Georgia state high-school championships as an amateur wrestler in 2003 and 2004. He signed with WWE in 2006 and featured for its developmental territory, Ohio Valley Wrestling (OVW), where he won every title in the promotion. Between 2007 and 2016, he won seven world tag team championships with four different partners, as well as the Intercontinental Championship twice. During this time, he adopted various gimmicks, including performing as Stardust, a melodramatic spin-off of his brother's gimmick, Goldust. He departed WWE in 2016 and returned in 2022, and has since won the Royal Rumble match in 2023 and 2024, the inaugural WWE Crown Jewel Championship in 2024, the King of the Ring tournament in 2025, and the WWE Championship three times, becoming the promotion's 34th Triple Crown Champion.

From 2016 until 2019, Rhodes wrestled on the independent circuit and for New Japan Pro-Wrestling (NJPW), Total Nonstop Action Wrestling (TNA), and Ring of Honor (ROH) under the mononym Cody, during which he won the ROH World Championship, ROH World Six-Man Tag Team Champion (with Matt Jackson and Nick Jackson), and the IWGP United States Heavyweight Championship once each. In 2018, Rhodes and the Jacksons independently promoted All In, where he won the NWA World's Heavyweight Championship. All In marked the first event by a promoter outside of WWE or World Championship Wrestling (WCW) to sell 10,000 tickets in the United States since 1993 and directly led to the formation of AEW in early 2019. Between 2019 and 2022, Rhodes served as an executive vice president and also wrestled for AEW, becoming the inaugural and a three-time AEW TNT Champion. Between WWE, AEW, ROH, NJPW, and NWA, Rhodes has held 19 total championships (including five world titles).

Outside of wrestling, Rhodes served as a judge on the competition television series Go-Big Show and starred with his wife Brandi Rhodes on the reality television series Rhodes to the Top.

== Early life ==
Rhodes was born in Charlotte, North Carolina, on June 30, 1985, the son of Michelle Rubio and professional wrestler Dusty Rhodes. He is of Cuban descent through his maternal grandfather. He has a sister named Teil in addition to his paternal half-brother and fellow professional wrestler Dustin and a paternal half-sister named Kristin, who is a former Dallas Cowboys cheerleader. He is the nephew of professional wrestlers Jerry Sags and Fred Ottman, and the godson of professional wrestler Magnum T. A., who was present at both Rhodes's birth and baptism. He legally changed his surname to "Runnels Rhodes" as a teenager.

Rhodes grew up in Georgia and went to Lassiter High School in Marietta, where he had a successful high school wrestling career. He placed sixth in the 171 lb (78 kg) division as a sophomore. As a junior, he won the Georgia state tournament at 189 lb (86 kg) in 2003 and repeated as champion his senior year. He had planned to wrestle collegiately at Penn State University, but decided to become a professional wrestler instead. During his time in high school, Rhodes also acted as a referee in his father's Turnbuckle Championship Wrestling promotion. After graduating from high school, Rhodes moved to Los Angeles and studied acting at the Howard Fine Acting School for a year.

== Professional wrestling career ==
=== World Wrestling Entertainment / WWE (2006–2016) ===
==== Ohio Valley Wrestling (2006–2007) ====
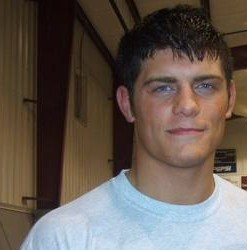
Runnels during his stay in Ohio Valley Wrestling (OVW) in 2007

Rhodes credits his father for starting to train him as a wrestler from the age of 12, which was limited mainly to simple fundamentals. From there, his training was provided by Al Snow, Danny Davis, Randy Orton, and Ricky Morton. Using his birth name Cody Runnels, he began wrestling in Ohio Valley Wrestling (OVW) on May 13, 2006. He formed a tag team with Shawn Spears in mid-August 2006 and won the OVW Southern Tag Team Championship twice. He also won the OVW Heavyweight Championship and the OVW Television Championship.

==== Teaming with Hardcore Holly (2007–2008) ====
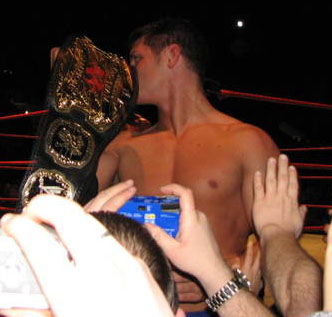
Rhodes captured his first championship in WWE in December 2007: the World Tag Team Championship, with partner Hardcore Holly

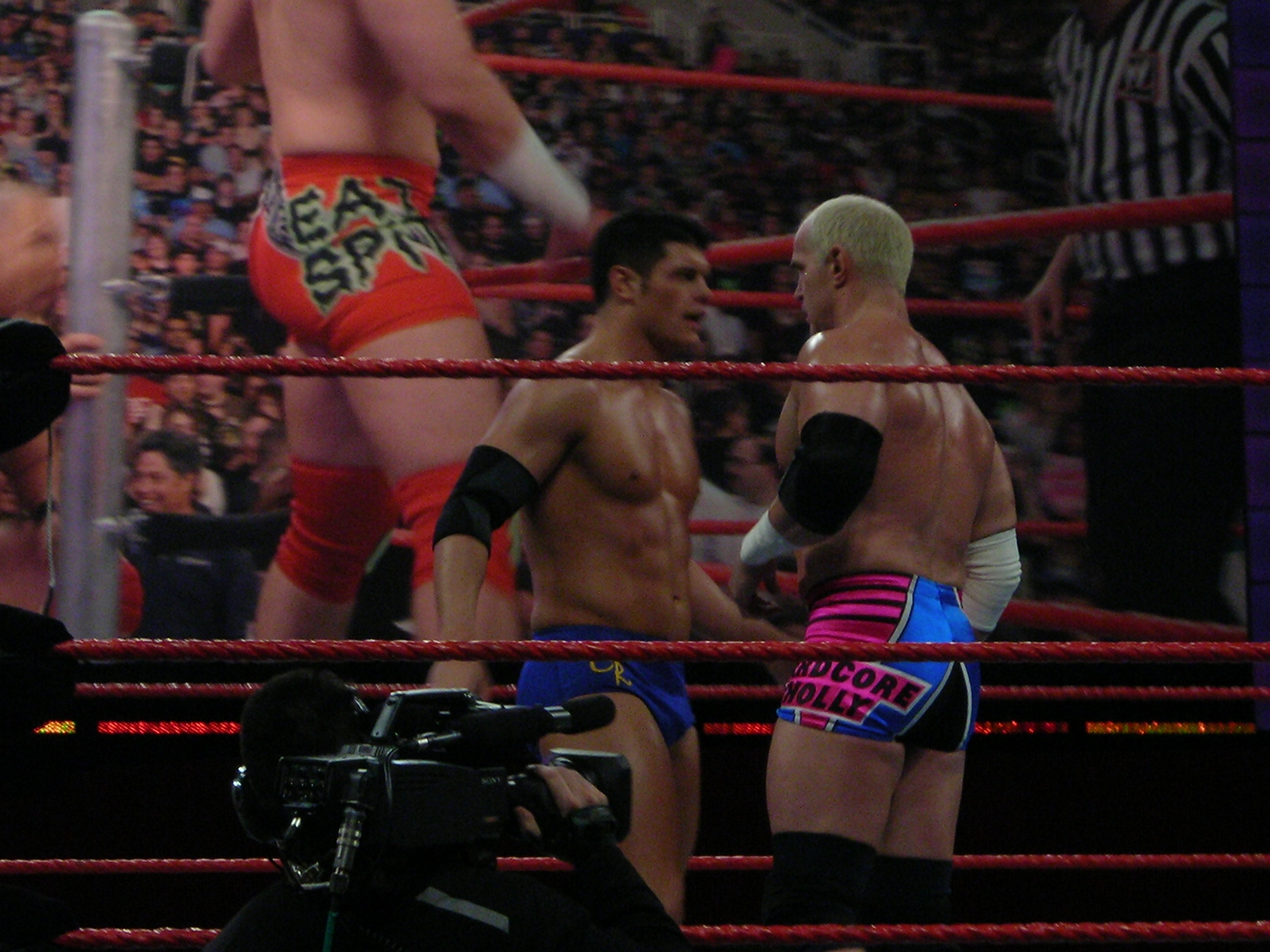
Rhodes (left) with Holly in February 2008

On the July 2, 2007, episode of Raw, Runnels made his television debut as a face, using his family's wrestling last name, Rhodes, in a backstage segment with his father Dusty Rhodes and Randy Orton, where Orton introduced himself to Rhodes and then slapped Dusty as a sign of disrespect. He made his main roster in-ring debut losing to Orton via pinfall on the July 16, 2007, episode of Raw. Rhodes appeared at The Great American Bash on July 22 to prevent Orton from further attacking his father. The next night on Raw, Rhodes challenged Orton to a rematch from the previous week, only to lose again. Orton followed this up by kicking Rhodes's father in the head.

In September, he began a feud with Hardcore Holly and lost three consecutive matches to him. Later, they would work as a tag team and they defeated Lance Cade and Trevor Murdoch on the Raw 15th Anniversary special episode for the World Tag Team Championship, marking Rhodes's first championship in WWE.

In May 2008, Ted DiBiase began feuding with the duo, threatening to take their titles in his first match as part of the Raw brand. At the pay-per-view event, Night of Champions on June 29, Rhodes turned on Holly by revealing himself as DiBiase's partner to help him win the match and also become a two-time World Tag Team Champion, turning heel in the process.

==== The Legacy (2008–2010) ====
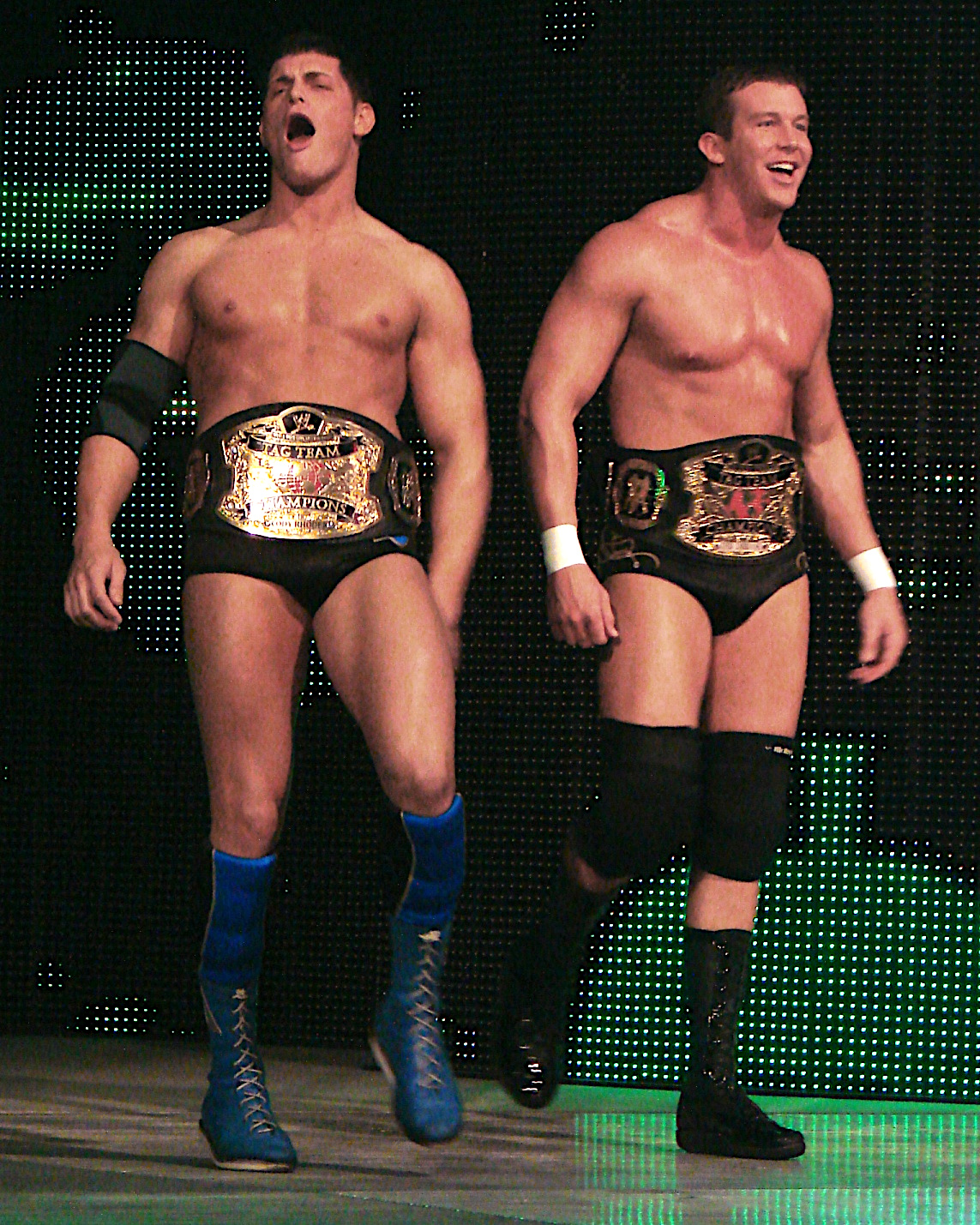
Rhodes (left) and his tag team partner Ted DiBiase Jr. as World Tag Team Champions in August 2008

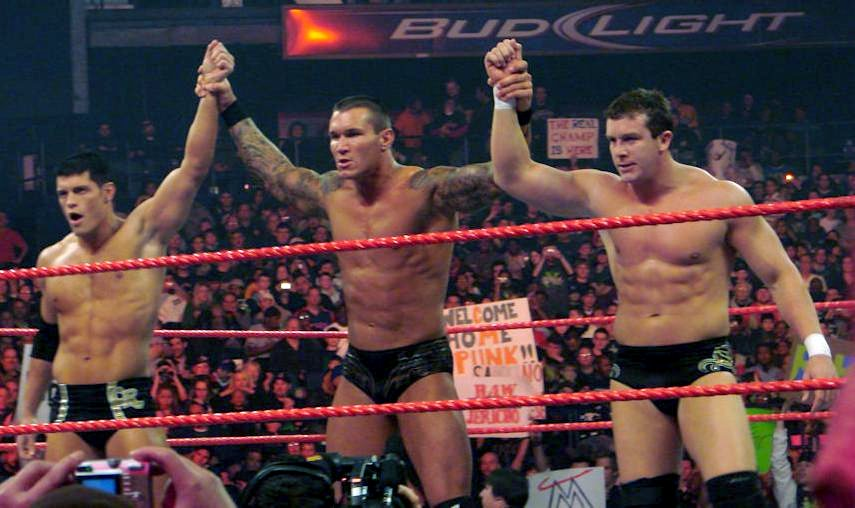
The Legacy in 2009 (from left to right): Rhodes, Randy Orton, and DiBiase

After holding the championship for just over a month, they dropped it to John Cena and Batista on the August 4 episode of Raw, but regained it the next week. Rhodes and DiBiase were then joined by Manu, the son of Afa, in September, forming a stable of multi-generational wrestlers. On the October 27 Raw, Rhodes and DiBiase lost the World Tag Team Championship to Kofi Kingston and CM Punk.

On November they began a storyline with Orton and, at Survivor Series on November 23, Rhodes, along with Orton, was a survivor, for Orton's team, in the annual Elimination match. The three of them created a stable with Orton called The Legacy.

As part of the Legacy, Rhodes entered the Royal Rumble match at the Royal Rumble on January 25, 2009, in order to help Orton win, and lasted until the final three, before being eliminated by Triple H. Rhodes and DiBiase became involved in Orton's scripted rivalry with the McMahon family, helping him to attack Shane and Stephanie McMahon, and Stephanie's real-life husband, Triple H. Rhodes was elevated to main event status as a result of joining the Legacy, competing in handicap and six-man tag team matches against Orton's opponents and rivals.

On April 26 at Backlash, Rhodes, DiBiase, and Orton defeated Triple H, Batista, and Shane McMahon in a six-man tag team match, which, per the pre-match stipulation, resulted in Orton winning the WWE Championship. Rhodes suffered a minor neck injury in June, but continued working.

Throughout mid-2009, Rhodes and DiBiase continued to compete against and attack Orton's rivals, especially Triple H. This led to Triple H reforming D-Generation X (DX) with Shawn Michaels, and DX defeated Rhodes and DiBiase at SummerSlam on August 23. Rhodes and DiBiase defeated DX at the following pay-per-view, Breaking Point on September 13 in a submissions count anywhere match, but were defeated in a Hell in a Cell match at the Hell in a Cell pay-per-view on October 4, when Rhodes was pinned following a sledgehammer shot to the head. Rhodes represented Team Raw at the first Bragging Rights pay-per-view on October 25, reluctantly teaming with DX. The match would go on to be won by Team SmackDown. At Survivor Series on November 22, having aided Orton in his feud with Kofi Kingston, was part of Team Orton (against Team Kingston) alongside DiBiase. Kingston would lastly eliminate Orton in the match to be sole survivor.

Tension within The Legacy became apparent at the Royal Rumble on January 31, 2010, when Rhodes attempted to interfere in Orton's match for the WWE Championship. Rhodes was caught by the referee, resulting in a disqualification for Orton, who attacked Rhodes and DiBiase, who had tried to help Rhodes, after the match. On the February 15 Raw, Orton took on Sheamus in a non-title rematch, but was again disqualified after Rhodes and DiBiase interfered. During the WWE Championship Elimination Chamber match at the Elimination Chamber pay-per-view on February 21, Rhodes interfered, passing a lead pipe through the cage to DiBiase. DiBiase hit Orton with the pipe and eliminated him from the match. The next night on Raw, Orton attacked Rhodes and DiBiase during a six-man tag team match, and they attacked Orton the following week in retaliation. This led to a triple threat match at WrestleMania XXVI on March 28, in which Orton defeated Rhodes and DiBiase.

==== Dashing and Undashing (2010–2011) ====
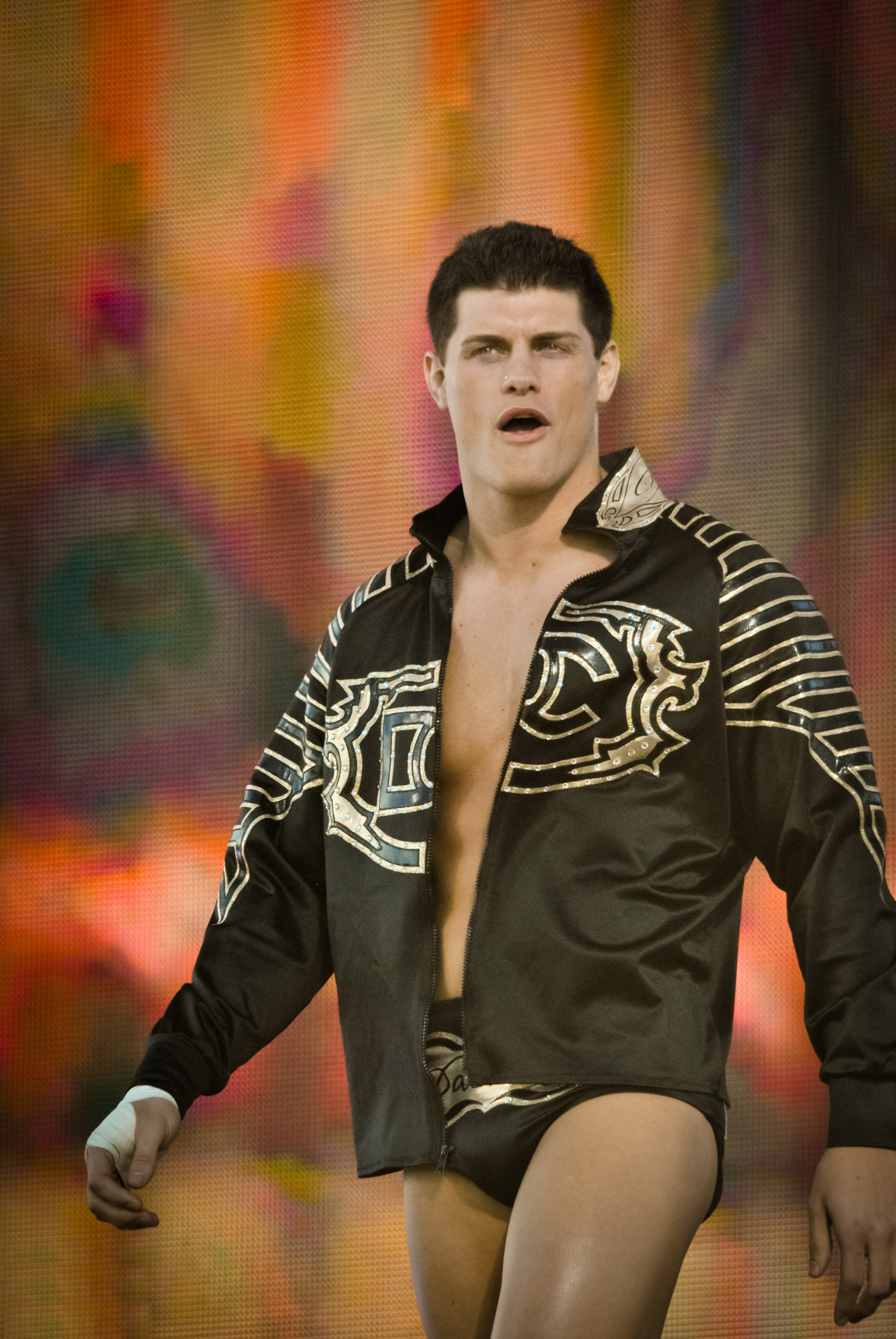
"Dashing" Cody Rhodes in 2010

As part of the 2010 WWE supplemental draft, Rhodes was drafted to the SmackDown brand. He made his debut for the brand on the April 30 SmackDown, by defeating John Morrison. The following week on SmackDown, Rhodes participated in a tournament for the vacant WWE Intercontinental Championship, but lost to Christian in the semi-finals. Rhodes mentored Husky Harris, a third-generation wrestler, in the second season of NXT.

On the June 25 SmackDown, Rhodes began a new narcissistic gimmick, claiming to be the best-looking wrestler in WWE and demanding to be called "Dashing" Cody Rhodes. Rhodes would participate in the SmackDown Money in the Bank ladder match at the first ever Money in the Bank pay-per-view event on July 18 but was unsuccessful as the match was won by Kane. As part of the gimmick, vignettes began airing in which Rhodes gave "grooming tips". He was extremely protective of his face during matches; if he was hit in the face, he threw a fit and checked his mirror. In September, he attacked Christian along with Drew McIntyre after a match, and the duo also attacked Matt Hardy, forming an alliance. At Night of Champions on September 19, Rhodes and McIntyre captured the WWE Tag Team Championship in a Tag Team Turmoil match. At Bragging Rights on October 24, Rhodes and McIntyre lost the championship to The Nexus (John Cena and David Otunga). On the October 29 SmackDown, after losing a tag team match, Rhodes and McIntyre dissolved their partnership.

On the January 21, 2011, episode of SmackDown, Rhodes faced Rey Mysterio in a match, during which Mysterio hit Rhodes in the face with his exposed knee brace and legitimately broke Rhodes's nose, which led to Rhodes declaring he was no longer dashing and had required facial reconstructive surgery. Rhodes was off television for several weeks. Upon his return, he wore a clear protective mask over his face and colluded with his father to attack Mysterio and remove Mysterio's mask on the February 25 SmackDown. Rhodes then regularly used his protective mask as a weapon during matches by headbutting opponents and using it to hit his opponents. In 2020, Rhodes said his time as Undashing Cody Rhodes was his second most successful work as a pro wrestler. Rhodes defeated Mysterio in a match at WrestleMania XXVII on April 3. The duo also faced off in a Falls Count Anywhere match at the Extreme Rules pay-per-view on May 1, which was won by Mysterio.

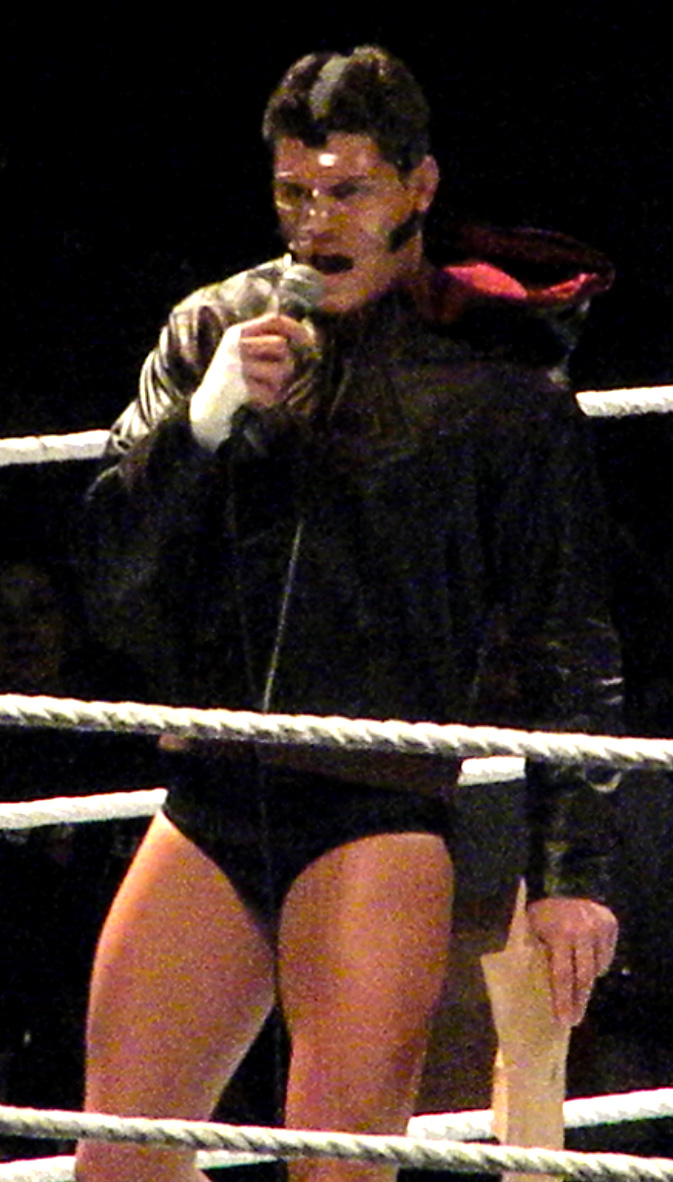
Rhodes wearing his protective mask and holding paper bag masks in June 2011

On subsequent episodes of SmackDown following WrestleMania XXVII, Rhodes, with the help of assistants, would hand out paper bags to the audience during his promos. Rhodes demanded the audience to put on the paper bags on their heads to cover their ugliness and imperfections, because they offended him. Rhodes also put paper bags over several of his opponents' heads after matches with them. Rhodes reformed his alliance with Ted DiBiase on the May 20 SmackDown, and the duo went on to feud with Sin Cara and Daniel Bryan. At the second annual Money in the Bank pay-per-view on July 17, Rhodes participated in the SmackDown Money in the Bank ladder match, but was unsuccessful as Bryan won the match.

==== Intercontinental Champion (2011–2012) ====
At the August 9 tapings of the August 12 SmackDown, Rhodes defeated Ezekiel Jackson to win the Intercontinental Championship, his first singles title with the company. The following week, Rhodes and DiBiase had a verbal confrontation with Orton. The following week, Rhodes attacked DiBiase after the latter lost a singles match to Orton, ending their alliance and resulting in an Intercontinental Championship match between the two at Night of Champions on September 18, which Rhodes won. Simultaneously, Rhodes had begun a feud with Orton, with Orton defeating Rhodes on the September 9 SmackDown, but Rhodes defeated Orton on the September 12 Raw SuperShow when Mark Henry distracted Orton. On the September 23 SmackDown, Rhodes defeated Orton by disqualification when Orton took Rhodes's mask off and hit him with it. Post-match, Orton attacked Rhodes with the timekeeper's bell, legitimately cutting Rhodes and causing him to bleed. The following week on SmackDown, Rhodes claimed he needed nine staples to close the wound.

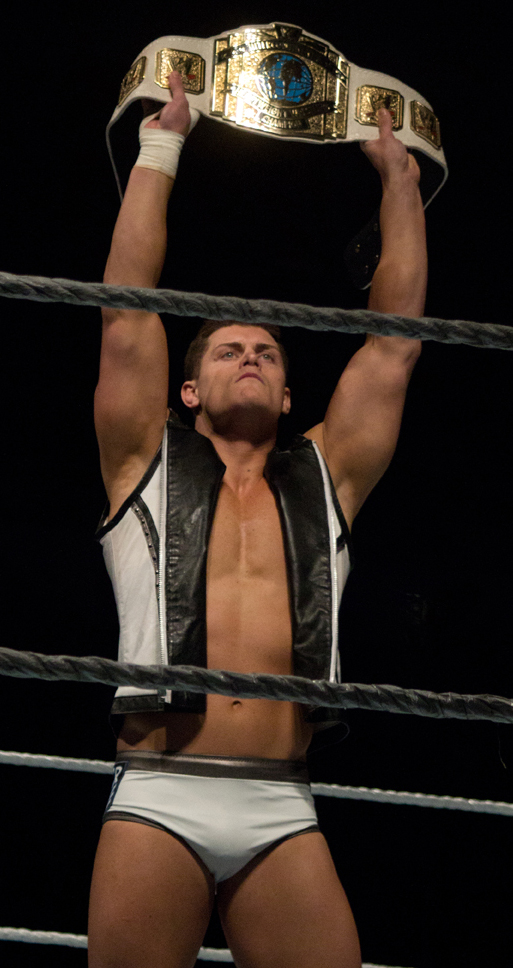
Rhodes as the Intercontinental Champion in January 2012

At the Hell in a Cell pay-per-view on October 2, Rhodes debuted a new design for the Intercontinental Championship, which included a white strap and plates similar to the title's classic 1980s design, before successfully defending it against John Morrison. Throughout October, Rhodes continued feuding with Orton, explaining that Orton had mistreated him during their time together as part of Legacy, costing him the World Heavyweight Championship and attacking him. At Vengeance on October 23, Rhodes was defeated by Orton in a non-title match. On the November 4 SmackDown, Orton defeated Rhodes in a Street Fight to end the feud; in the process, Orton broke Rhodes's mask. On the November 14 Raw SuperShow, Rhodes reappeared without his mask, claiming that Orton had set him free, signalling the end of his masked gimmick. At Survivor Series on November 20, Rhodes was sole survivor alongside Team Captain Wade Barrett in their traditional Survivor Series match against Team Orton.

Rhodes then feuded with SmackDown commentator Booker T, attacking him from behind on several occasions and successfully retaining the Intercontinental Championship against him at TLC: Tables, Ladders & Chairs on December 18 and on the January 6, 2012, SmackDown. At the Royal Rumble on January 29, Rhodes competed in the Royal Rumble match, lasting over 40 minutes and eliminating more wrestlers than other any other competitor with six, before he was eliminated by Big Show. At Elimination Chamber on February 19, Rhodes pinned Big Show in the World Heavyweight Championship Elimination Chamber match, before being eliminated by Santino Marella. Rhodes spent the following weeks highlighting Big Show's embarrassing moments in previous WrestleManias, often costing Big Show to lose matches in the process. At WrestleMania XXVIII on April 1, Rhodes lost the Intercontinental Championship to Big Show, ending his near eight-month reign of 233 days.

Following the loss at WrestleMania, Rhodes went on a brief losing streak, due to Big Show distracting him during matches. Four weeks after losing the title, Rhodes regained it at Extreme Rules on April 29 by defeating Big Show in a Tables match. On the May 7 episode of Raw SuperShow, Rhodes retained his title against Big Show in a rematch after getting himself counted out. Two weeks later at Over the Limit on May 20, Rhodes lost the Intercontinental Championship to the returning Christian. He would go on to lose to Christian in a rematch for the title at No Way Out on June 17. On the June 29 SmackDown, Rhodes and David Otunga were defeated by Christian and United States Champion Santino Marella in a Money in the Bank qualification match for the World Heavyweight Championship, due to Otunga being pinned. Afterwards, Rhodes claimed that he had not lost and demanded another chance. Four days later on Super SmackDown Live, the WWE Board of Directors granted Rhodes another shot and he defeated Christian to earn a spot in the match. At Money in the Bank on July 15, he was unsuccessful as the match was won by Dolph Ziggler. On September 16 at Night of Champions, Rhodes failed to capture the Intercontinental Championship from The Miz in a fatal-four-way match, also involving Rey Mysterio and Sin Cara.

==== Team Rhodes Scholars (2012–2013) ====
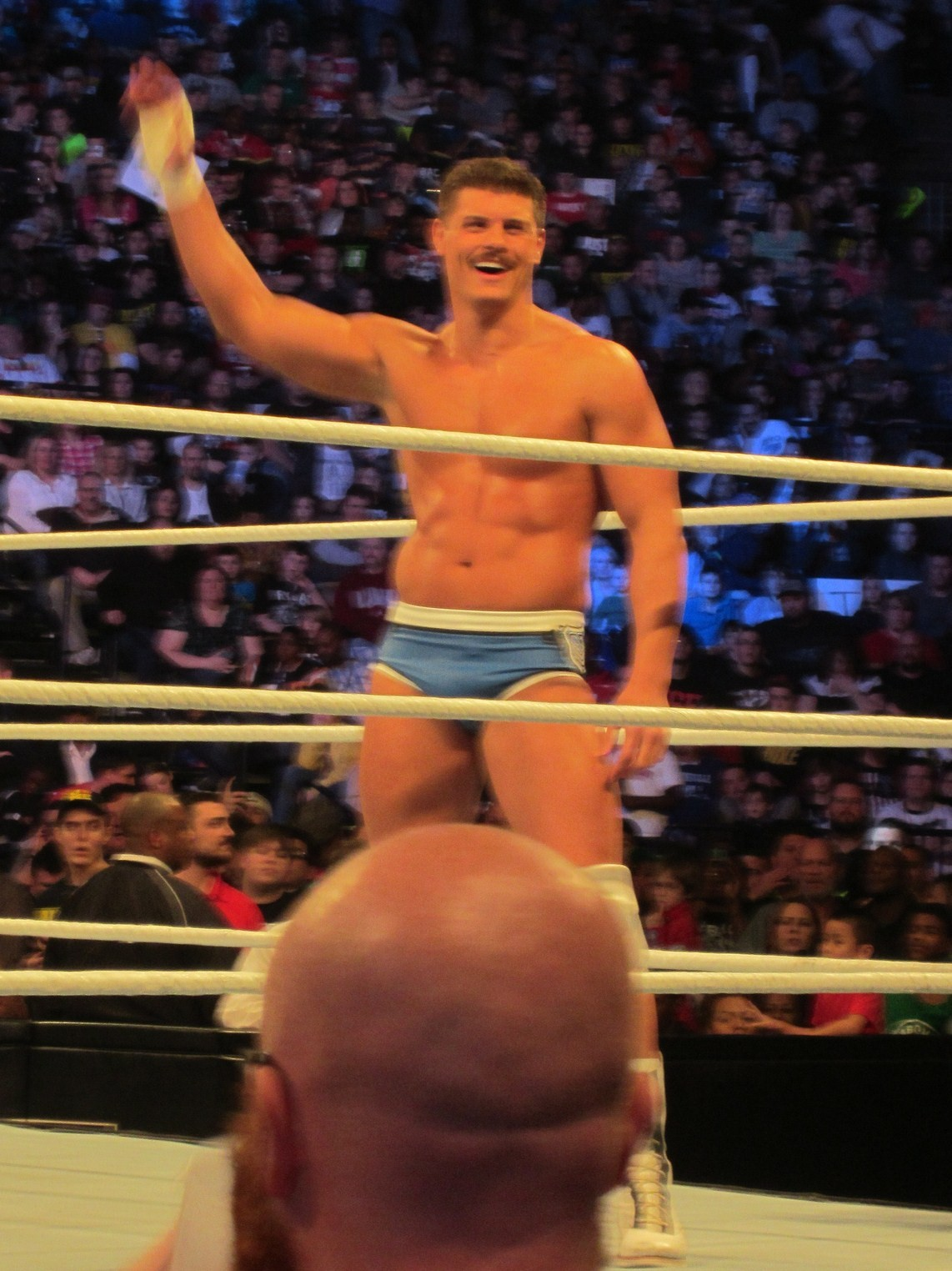
Rhodes sporting a moustache following his return from injury

Rhodes then aligned himself with Damien Sandow, attacking Tag Team Champions Team Hell No (Daniel Bryan and Kane) on the September 24 Raw. The team, now known as "Rhodes Scholars", won a Tag Team Championship tournament to become the number one contenders to the Tag Team Championship, but after defeating Team Hell No (Daniel Bryan and Kane) by disqualification at Hell in a Cell on October 28, they were defeated by Team Hell No on the November 14 episode of Main Event. Rhodes suffered a concussion and a strained shoulder in the latter match, resulting in him being removed from his traditional five-on-five tag team match at Survivor Series on November 18.

After he returned from injury, sporting a mustache, he and Sandow worked as a tag team, facing the champions Team Hell No twice: one on the December 19 episode of Main Event and another at the Royal Rumble on January 27, 2013. They would also be joined by The Bella Twins, as they began feuding with Tons of Funk (Brodus Clay and Tensai) and The Funkadactyls (Cameron and Naomi). The two teams were originally booked to face each other in an eight-person mixed tag team match on April 7 at WrestleMania 29, but their match was cut due to time constraints. The match instead took place the following night on Raw, where Tons of Funk and The Funkadactyls emerged victorious.

On July 14 at Money in the Bank pay-per-view, Rhodes competed in the World Heavyweight Championship Money in the Bank ladder match, which was won by Damien Sandow after Sandow turned on Rhodes and threw him off of the ladder just as Rhodes was about to win the match. The following night on Raw, Rhodes attacked Sandow and dissolved Team Rhodes Scholars, turning face for the first time since 2008. They feuded over the briefcase, which Rhodes threw into the Gulf of Mexico. On August 18 at SummerSlam, now no longer sporting a mustache, Rhodes defeated Sandow in a singles match, and did so again the following night on Raw.

==== The Brotherhood (2013–2014) ====
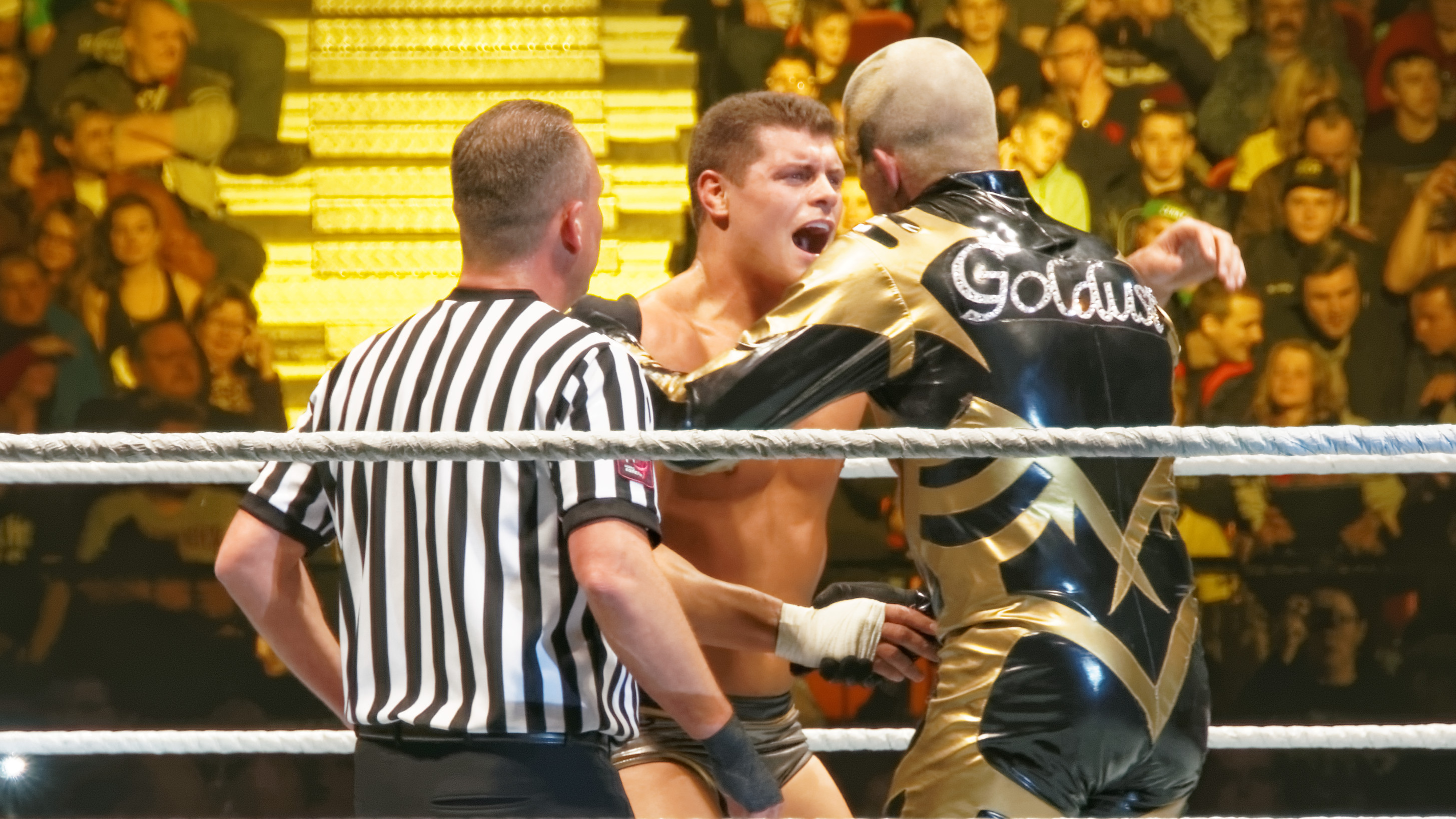
In 2013, Goldust returned to WWE, teaming with his half-brother Cody.

In September, Rhodes started a storyline with his brother against Triple H. After Rhodes was defeated by Orton on the September 2 episode of Raw, he was fired in storyline. This was put in place to give Rhodes time off for his marriage and honeymoon to Brandi Reed. Over the next few weeks, Rhodes's brother Goldust also lost to Orton with Cody's reinstatement on the line, while his father Dusty Rhodes was knocked out by Big Show while pleading for his sons to get their jobs back. In return, the vengeful Rhodes brothers gatecrashed Raw by attacking The Shield.

On October 6 at Battleground, Rhodes and Goldust defeated the WWE Tag Team Champions, Roman Reigns and Seth Rollins in a non-title match with the stipulation that they would be re-signed. On the October 14 episode of Raw, they defeated The Shield in a No Disqualification match to become Tag Team Champions. The Rhodes brothers then retain the titles for months, over opponents which included the former champions The Shield, until they lost them at the Royal Rumble on January 26, 2014, to The New Age Outlaws.

==== Stardust, creative frustration, and departure (2014–2016) ====
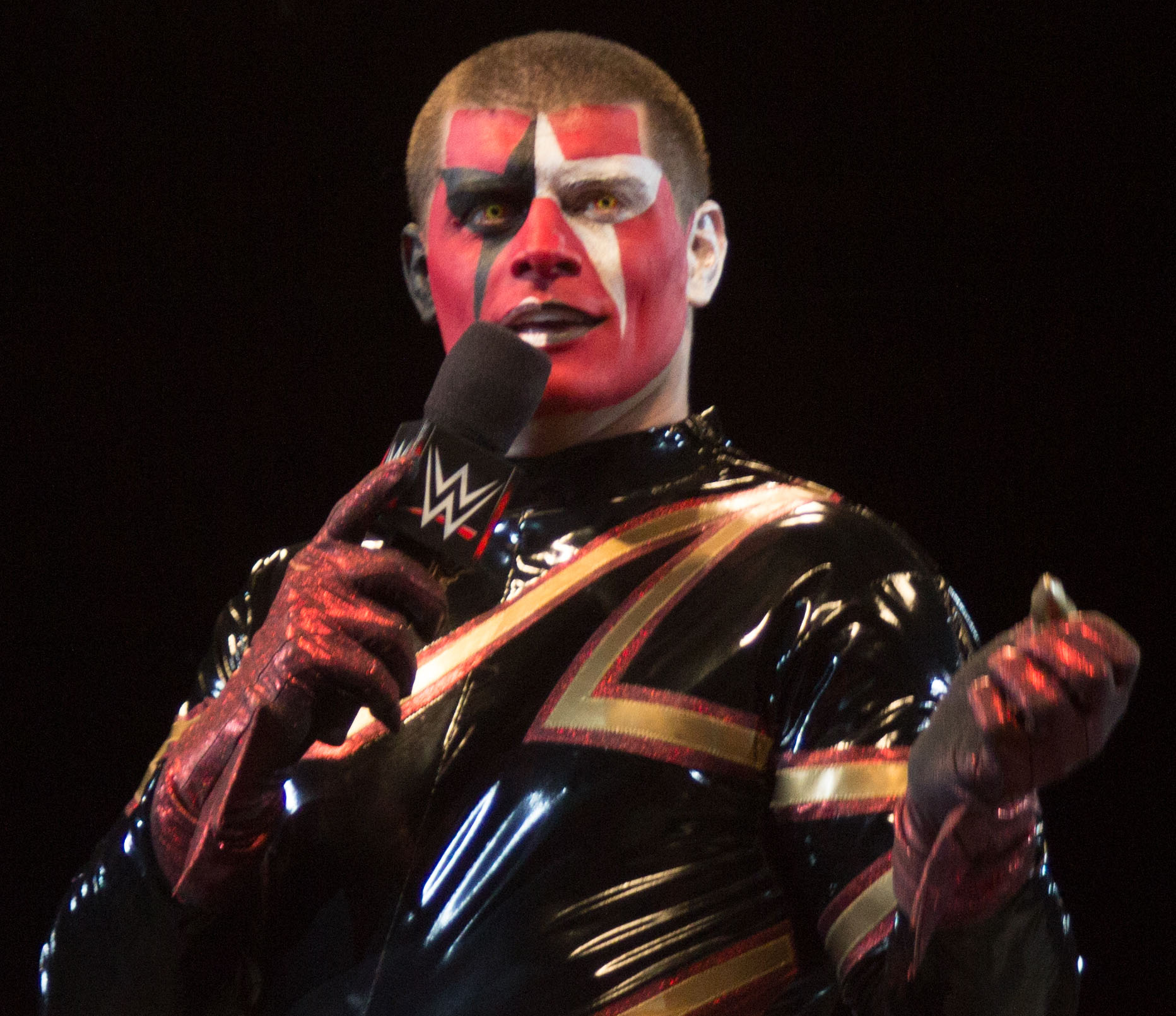
Rhodes as Stardust in January 2015

On the June 16 Raw, Rhodes debuted a new character called Stardust (a ring name also previously used by his father during his time in American Wrestling Association), with face paint, a bodysuit and mannerisms similar to those of Goldust. He teamed with his brother to defeat RybAxel that night and then at both Money in the Bank and on Raw. On the August 18 Raw, Stardust and Goldust defeated the WWE Tag Team Champions The Usos in a non-title match. This led to a rematch on the August 25 Raw, where Stardust and Goldust defeated The Usos via countout, but did not win the titles. After the match, both Stardust and Goldust attacked The Usos. At Night of Champions, Stardust and Goldust defeated the Usos to become WWE Tag Team Champions for their second reign as a team. At Hell in a Cell, they successfully retained against The Usos. They lost the title to Damien Mizdow and The Miz in a fatal four-way tag team match also involving The Usos and Los Matadores the next month at Survivor Series, while also losing a rematch the next night on Raw. At TLC they lost to the newly formed team The New Day.

On February, the team disbanded after Cody executed Cross Rhodes on Goldust. This led to a match between Goldust and Stardust at Fastlane, which Goldust won. The brothers tried to have a match at WrestleMania, but the WWE Chairman Vince McMahon did not book the match, since he felt the match was not good enough for WrestleMania.

The Stardust character eventually evolved to resemble a comic book supervillain, which led to him entering a storyline rivalry with actor Stephen Amell, renaming his finishing maneuver The Queen's Crossbow, after Oliver Queen, Amell's character from Arrow. At SummerSlam, he and Barrett were defeated in a tag team match by Amell and Neville. Then, he began to work with The Ascension, forming the faction "The Cosmic Wasteland". At Night of Champions, they defeated Neville and The Lucha Dragons in a six-man tag team match in the pre-show. From September until May, he worked on television and PPV in minor storylines and losses. At WrestleMania 32, Stardust competed in a seven-man ladder match for the Intercontinental Championship, which was won by Zack Ryder.

On May 21, 2016, Rhodes revealed on Twitter that he had requested his release from WWE, which was officially granted the following day. Rhodes cited frustrations with WWE's creative department and his position within the company as the reasons for requesting his release, noting that he had "pleaded" with writers to end the Stardust gimmick for over six months and pitched numerous storyline ideas which had been ignored. Reflecting on Rhodes's WWE career, Dave Meltzer of the Wrestling Observer wrote that following his run with Legacy, Rhodes was "used as more of a lower and mid-card wrestler in a number of changing roles", adding that "his career had gone nowhere and he hadn't been used well". James Caldwell of Pro Wrestling Torch wrote that Rhodes "had been floundering as the Stardust character over the past year or so, mostly landing on Superstars or Main Event". Jason Powell of Pro Wrestling Dot Net commented that Rhodes choosing to leave was "surprising in the sense that Cody and his family have worked for WWE for so long". Meanwhile, Dave Scherer of Pro Wrestling Insider wrote: "I can't say I blame him a bit. Not even a little bit. WWE never gave him a real chance, and that's just sad to me". In September 2019, Rhodes revealed WWE Executive Vice President Triple H's reaction to his WWE departure, where Rhodes stated:

[Triple H] took [the departure] personally because he had done so much for my dad. There was one conversation where he said, "I'm shocked that you feel this way after everything I've done for your family." But I told him, "I'm not my dad. I can't stay here out of loyalty to you for giving my dad a job in 2005. I really appreciate what you did for my dad. But I'm not him. He's not here anymore. I've got to be me." I think [he] knew, "Oh, this is real. He's not asking for more money. He's not asking for a title shot. Nothing would matter at this point."

Despite that, Rhodes consistently spoke highly of WWE following his departure, adding that there were no grudges between him and the company and that any decisions the company makes regarding him are largely business-based. This included WWE redesigning the Intercontinental Championship belt (whose 2011–2019 design was introduced in storyline by Rhodes) in 2019 around the same time AEW launched being a coincidence as opposed to trying to separate themselves from Rhodes, as Rhodes himself acknowledged that the physical belt was due for a redesign anyway.

=== Independent circuit (2016–2018) ===
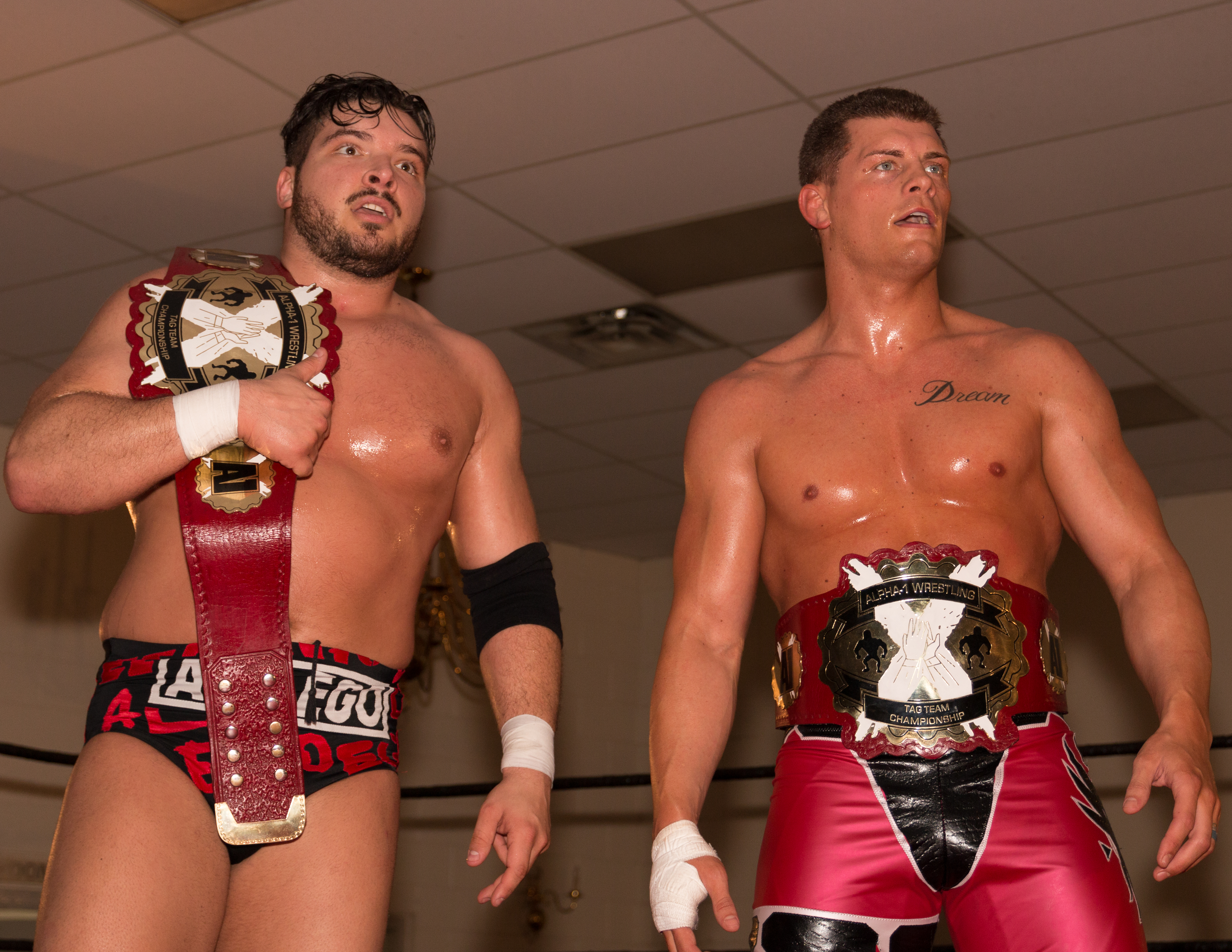
Rhodes (right) and Ethan Page as A1 Tag Team Champions in June 2017

After he left WWE, Rhodes continued working under his real name on the independent circuit, but often dropped his last name in order to avoid conflict with WWE. Rhodes's first post-WWE match was for Evolve in Joppa, Maryland, on August 19 at Evolve 66, defeating Zack Sabre Jr. by submission. After the match, Rhodes called out Drew Galloway. The following day, he lost to Chris Hero.

Rhodes wrestled for the Northeast Wrestling promotion, most notably facing Kurt Angle in a Steel Cage match. He also participated in Pro Wrestling Guerrilla's Battle of Los Angeles tournament, where he Rhodes was eliminated from the tournament in the quarterfinals by eventual winner Marty Scurll. He also won the Global Force Wrestling' GFW NEX*GEN Championship when he defeated Sonjay Dutt.

In May 2017, Dave Meltzer suggested that an independent wrestling show would be unable to sell out a ten thousand seat arena in the United States. Rhodes, along with The Young Bucks, challenged the idea by planning a show specifically for the purposes of drawing ten thousand fans. In May 2018, it was announced that the show would be named All In. On May 13, 2018, tickets to "All In" sold out in 30 minutes. At the event on September 1, Cody defeated Nick Aldis to win the NWA World Heavyweight Championship. Cody lost the championship back to Aldis in a two-out-of-three falls match at the NWA 70th Anniversary Show on October 21.

=== Ring of Honor (2016–2018) ===
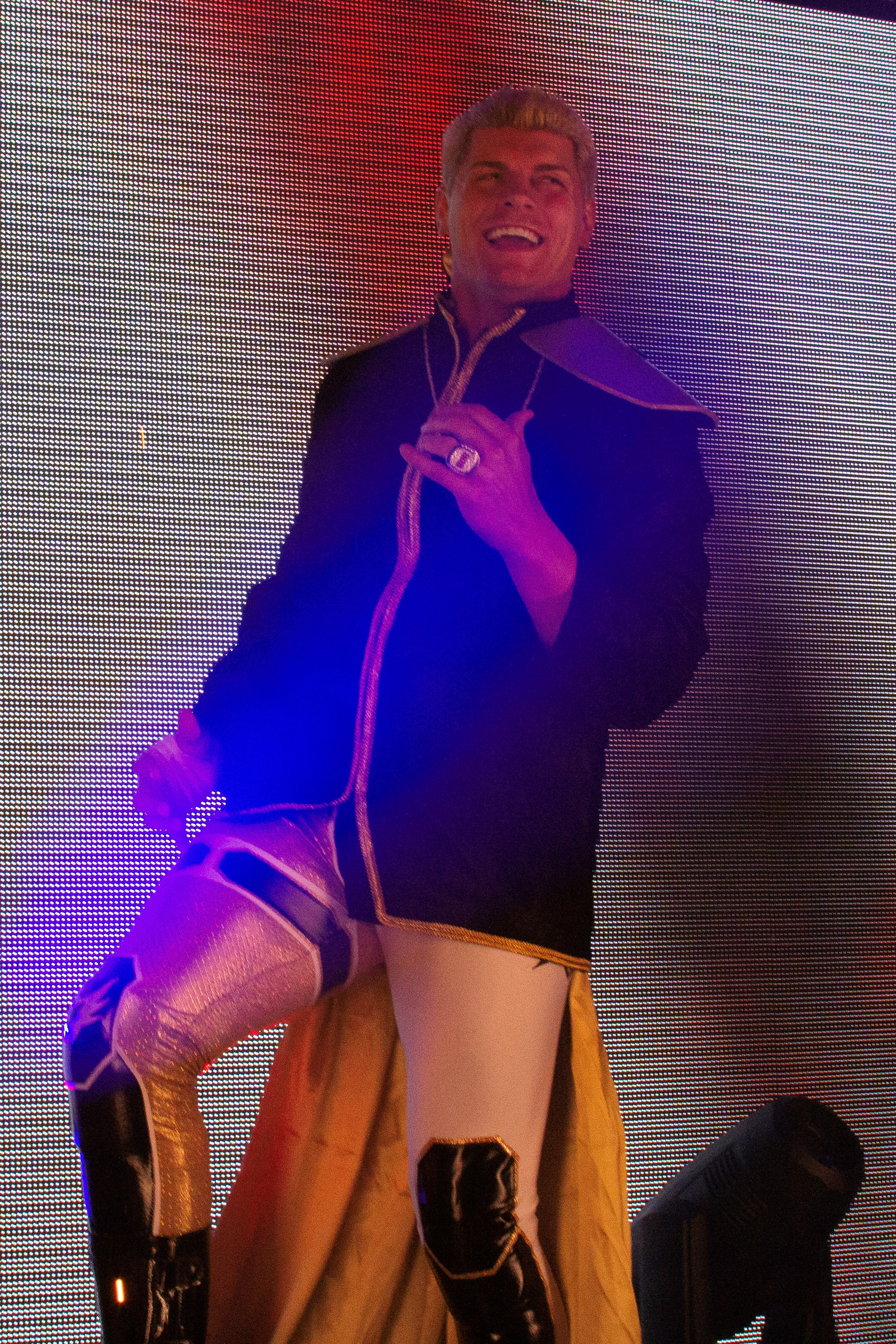
Cody at a Ring of Honor show in 2018

On July 19, 2016, Rhodes announced that he would appear at Ring of Honor's (ROH) Final Battle pay-per-view on December 2. ROH made the official announcement the following day. At the event, Rhodes, who was simply billed as Cody, defeated Jay Lethal following a low blow, then proceed to attack Lethal, senior referee Todd Sinclair, taunted ROH fans and shoved ROH commentator Steve Corino. On the January 18 episode of Ring of Honor Wrestling, Cody defeated Corino. At the Supercard of Honor XI event on April 1, Cody was defeated by Jay Lethal in a Texas Bullrope match. Later in the night, he attacked former ROH World Champion Christopher Daniels. On May 12 at War of the Worlds, Cody unsuccessfully challenged Christopher Daniels for the ROH World Championship in a three-way match also involving Jay Lethal. On June 23 at Best in the World, Cody defeated Daniels to become the new ROH World Champion, marking the first world title of his career. Cody was also billed as the first member of the Rhodes family to capture a world title in 31 years. Cody and Dusty are the second father-son combination to win major world championships in the United States after Fritz and Kerry Von Erich.

On September 23, it was confirmed that Cody had signed an exclusive contract with ROH. On December 15 at Final Battle, Cody, now with bleached blond hair, lost the ROH World Championship to Dalton Castle. On July 21, 2018, he and fellow Bullet Club members The Young Bucks defeated The Kingdom to win the ROH World Six-Man Tag Team Championship, marking his first reign. Cody and The Bucks lost the titles at Survival of the Fittest to The Kingdom on November 4 after a 106-day reign and two successful title defenses. Cody faced Jay Lethal for the ROH World Championship at Final Battle, but he lost the match. The next day, Cody left ROH.

=== Total Nonstop Action Wrestling/Impact Wrestling (2016–2017) ===
Rhodes was expected to work events for Total Nonstop Action Wrestling (TNA) while simultaneously working in ROH, both deals being non-exclusive. On September 22, TNA confirmed Rhodes, billed as Cody, would be debuting for the promotion on October 2 at Bound for Glory. At Bound for Glory, Cody, alongside his wife Brandi Rhodes, made his debut as a face, attacking Mike Bennett and his wife Maria to begin a feud between the two couples. On the October 6 episode of Impact Wrestling, Cody cut a promo where he put over the company and said he has a shot at the TNA World Heavyweight Championship, but Bennett and Maria interrupted and the segment ended with a brawl. On the October 13 episode of Impact Wrestling, Cody made his in-ring debut by defeating Bennett. On the October 20 episode of Impact Wrestling, Cody challenged Eddie Edwards for the Impact World Heavyweight Championship, but lost the match. On the October 27 Impact Wrestling, Cody and Brandi defeated Bennett and Maria. After the match, Cody was attacked backstage by Lashley, and this was done to write him off television.

Cody returned on the February 23, 2017, episode of Impact Wrestling, calling out Moose to thank him for helping his wife Brandi while he was away. After learning Brandi had Moose's phone number, Cody attacked Moose, turning heel. On the March 30 episode of Impact Wrestling, Cody unsuccessfully faced Moose for the Impact Grand Championship. Rhodes's contract with the promotion ended shortly after.

=== New Japan Pro-Wrestling (2016–2019) ===
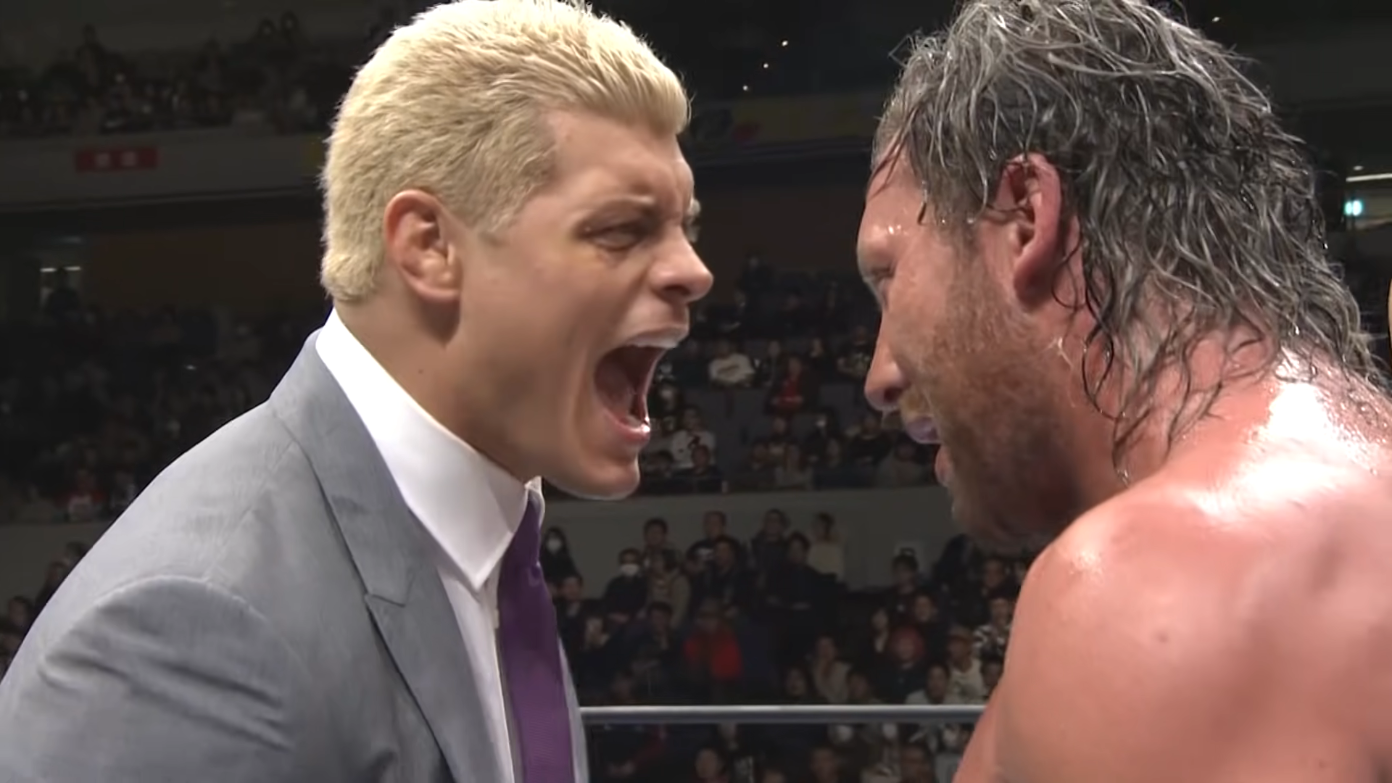
During their time together in NJPW, Rhodes and Kenny Omega consistently butted heads over control of Bullet Club...

...eventually culminating in Rhodes attacking Omega at The New Beginning in Sapporo, leading to a "Civil War" within the stable.

On December 10, 2016, Rhodes, billed as "The American Nightmare", appeared at New Japan Pro-Wrestling's (NJPW) World Tag League finals via video package, announcing himself as the newest member of Bullet Club. On January 4, 2017, Cody defeated Juice Robinson in his debut match at Wrestle Kingdom 11 in Tokyo Dome. Cody returned to NJPW in February during the NJPW and ROH co-produced Honor Rising: Japan 2017 shows. After defeating Michael Elgin at Dominion 6.11 in Osaka-jo Hall on June 11, Cody challenged Kazuchika Okada to a match for the IWGP Heavyweight Championship. The match took place on July 1 at G1 Special in USA, with Okada winning. During the finals of the G1 Climax 27 on August 13, Cody and Bullet Club stablemate Hangman Page unsuccessfully challenged War Machine (Hanson and Raymond Rowe) for the IWGP Tag Team Championship.

Cody faced Kota Ibushi at Wrestle Kingdom 12 on January 4, 2018, in a losing effort. At The New Beginning in Sapporo, he attacked Kenny Omega with the help of Page, eventually being stopped by Ibushi. This led to a match at the G1 Special in San Francisco on July 7, where Cody unsuccessfully challenged Omega for the IWGP Heavyweight Championship. After the match, as the "BC Firing Squad" of King Haku, Tanga Loa, and Tama Tonga attacked Omega and the rest of Bullet Club, Cody refused to aid the attackers and embraced the Bullet Club members afterward. At Fighting Spirit Unleashed, Cody defeated Robinson to win the IWGP United States Heavyweight Championship, his first championship in NJPW. Cody again failed to defeat Omega for the championship in a three-way match also involving Ibushi at King of Pro-Wrestling on October 8. On October 24, Cody announced that he was no longer affiliated with Bullet Club, and he would continue teaming with Omega, The Young Bucks, Page and Marty Scurll as The Elite. At Wrestle Kingdom 13 on January 4, 2019, Cody lost the United States Heavyweight Championship back to Robinson. On February 7, his profile was removed from NJPW website.

=== All Elite Wrestling (2019–2022) ===
==== Formation of AEW and early storylines (2019–2020) ====
In November 2018, several trademarks were filed in Jacksonville, Florida that indicated the launch of a new wrestling promotion. On January 1, 2019, All Elite Wrestling (AEW) was unveiled during a conference in Jacksonville, with Cody revealing that he, along with Matt and Nick Jackson of The Young Bucks and Kenny Omega, would serve as Executive Vice Presidents, as well as on-air talent. Both Cody and The Young Bucks signed five-year contracts with the promotion. At their inaugural event on May 25, Double or Nothing, Cody defeated Dustin Rhodes; it would later win "Match of the Year" from Pro Wrestling Illustrated. On June 29 at Fyter Fest, Cody wrestled Darby Allin to a time limit draw. After the match, Rhodes was attacked by Shawn Spears and struck with a chair shot that caused Rhodes to bleed heavily from the back of his head. While Rhodes did not suffer a concussion, he did require 12 surgical staples. Spears' actions would be condemned by MJF, Cody's self-proclaimed best friend. MJF would later become Cody's cornerman for his matches.

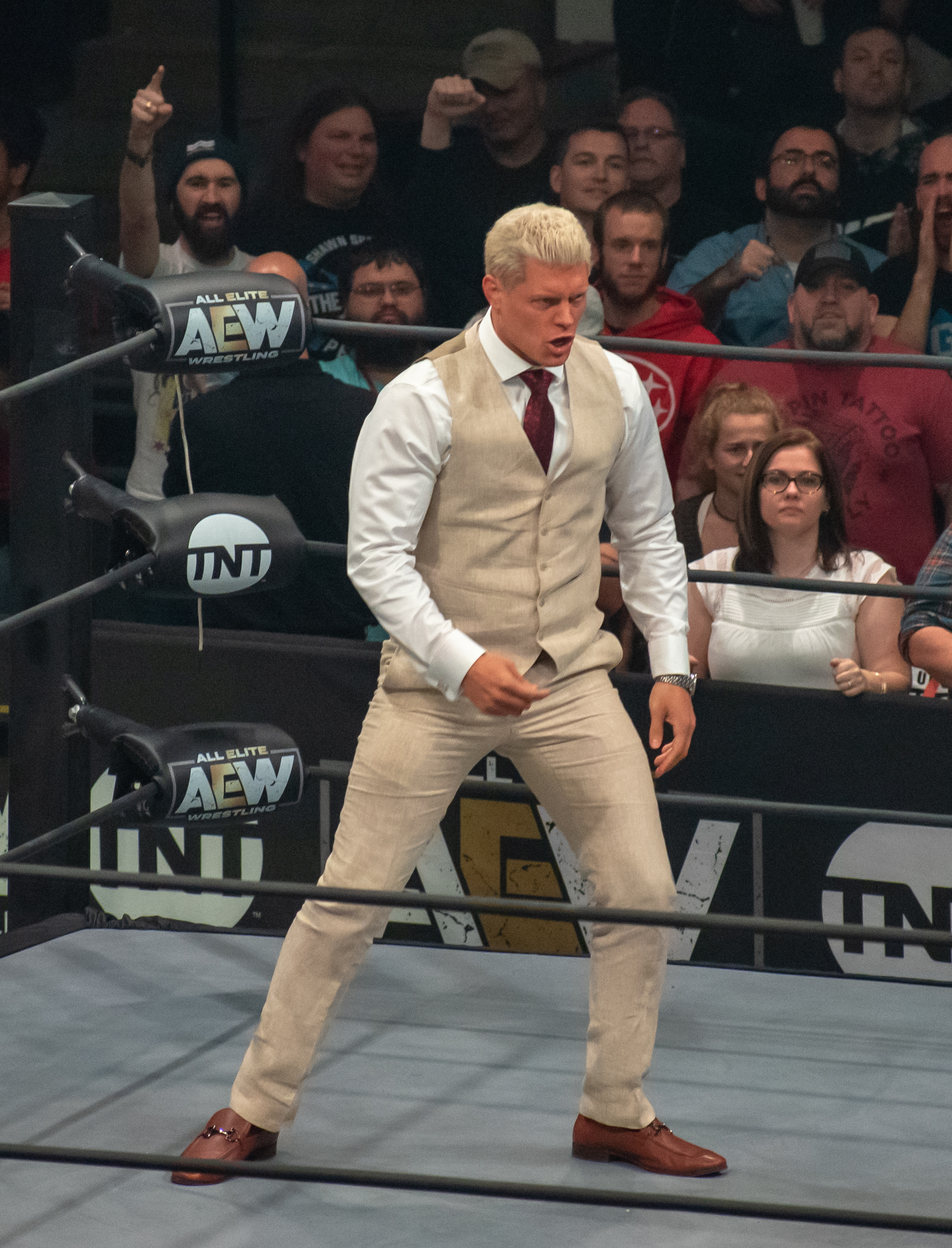
Rhodes in October 2019

At All Out on August 31, Cody emerged victorious over Spears. With this win, Cody improved his win–loss–draw record in singles matches to 2–0–1, granting him a match for the AEW World Championship against Chris Jericho at the Full Gear pay-per-view. On the premiere episode of Dynamite on October 2, Cody and The Young Bucks were beaten down by Jericho, Sammy Guevara, Jake Hager, Santana and Ortiz, leading to the creation of The Inner Circle to rival The Elite. On the November 6 episode of Dynamite, Cody announced that if he were to lose at Full Gear, he would never challenge for the AEW World Championship again. At Full Gear on November 9, Cody failed to win the championship from Jericho after MJF threw in the towel. After the match, MJF turned on Cody by kicking him the groin.

Over the following months, Cody attempted to secure a match with MJF, which MJF agreed to do as long as Cody met three stipulations: he could not touch MJF until the match, he would have to defeat MJF's bodyguard Wardlow in a steel cage match, and he would have to take ten lashes with a leather belt. After taking the lashes, Cody defeated Wardlow in a steel cage match on the February 19, 2020, episode of Dynamite to arrange the match for the Revolution pay-per-view. Cody was defeated by MJF at Revolution on February 29.

==== TNT Champion and departure (2020–2022) ====
On March 30, AEW announced a new title, the AEW TNT Championship; Cody was announced as a participant for an eight-man, single-elimination tournament to crown the inaugural champion. Cody defeated Shawn Spears and Darby Allin to reach the finals of the tournament to face Lance Archer, who also advanced to the finals. At Double Or Nothing on May 23, Cody defeated Archer to become the inaugural TNT Champion; Mike Tyson afterwards presented Cody with the title belt. Over the following weeks, Cody successfully defended the championship against the likes of Jungle Boy, Marq Quen, Ricky Starks, Jake Hager, Sonny Kiss, Eddie Kingston, Warhorse, and Scorpio Sky. Cody lost the championship to Brodie Lee on the August 22 episode of Dynamite, ending his reign at 82 days (91 days as recognized by AEW due to tape delay). Subsequently, it was reported that Cody would be taking up a leave of absence from the company.

Cody returned on the September 23 episode of Dynamite, attacking Brodie Lee and members of his faction, The Dark Order. Cody would defeat Brodie Lee to win the TNT Championship in a Dog Collar match on the October 7 episode of Dynamite, beginning his second reign with the championship, also marking Lee's final match before his death in December of that year. On November 7, Cody, now once again under the full name Cody Rhodes due to WWE cancelling their trademark on the name (in a settlement that saw Cody relinquishing his claim to the trademarks for several WCW event names), lost the TNT Championship to Darby Allin at Full Gear.

After losing the TNT Championship, Rhodes would begin a feud with famed basketball player Shaquille O'Neal. On the March 3, 2021, episode of Dynamite, Rhodes teamed with Red Velvet in a loss to O'Neal and his partner Jade Cargill in a mixed tag team match. At the Revolution event on March 7, Rhodes competed in the Face of the Revolution Ladder Match for a future opportunity at the TNT Championship, but the match was won by Scorpio Sky.

On the March 31 episode of Dynamite, Rhodes began a feud with Q. T. Marshall, after Marshall and his allies Aaron Solo, Nick Comoroto and the debutant Anthony Ogogo assaulted Rhodes after a match. At the Blood and Guts event on May 5, Rhodes defeated Marshall, before going on to defeat Ogogo at the Double or Nothing pay-per-view later that month. At the Road Rager event on July 7, Rhodes defeated Marshall in a South Beach Strap match to end the feud. Following this, Rhodes began a feud with the debuting Malakai Black. At the Homecoming event on August 4, Rhodes was quickly defeated by Black. After taking a hiatus, Rhodes returned to face Black in a rematch at Grand Slam on September 22, but he was again defeated. On the October 23 episode of Dynamite, Rhodes finally defeated Black. At Full Gear, Rhodes teamed up with Pac against Black and Andrade El Idolo in a winning effort. On the December 1 episode of Dynamite, Rhodes defeated Andrade in an Atlanta street fight.

Rhodes began a feud with Sammy Guevara over the TNT Championship, on December 25 at the special Holiday Bash episode of Rampage, Rhodes defeated Guevara to win the title for a record third time. At the Beach Break event on January 26, 2022, Rhodes lost the title back to Guevara in a ladder match. This would be Rhodes's last match in AEW, as on February 15, 2022, several sources reported that he and his wife Brandi had left the promotion as they were unable to come to terms on a new contract. He has cited since that he left AEW because of a personal issue.

=== Return to WWE ===
==== Championship pursuits (2022–2024) ====
On March 18, 2022, it was reported by multiple sources that Rhodes had re-signed with WWE. On the first night of WrestleMania 38 on April 2, Rhodes was revealed as Seth "Freakin" Rollins' surprise opponent, making his return to WWE after six years and defeating Rollins. On the following episode of Raw, Rhodes stated that he returned to WWE to win the championship that his father, Dusty Rhodes, never got to hold, the WWE Championship. Rhodes subsequently defeated Rollins once more in a rematch at WrestleMania Backlash. Ahead of their Hell in a Cell match at the eponymous event, Rhodes suffered a legitimate pectoral muscle tear, which had eventuated halfway through a brawl on the prior episode of Raw. The injury was exacerbated when the muscle tore entirely off the bone while Rhodes was weight training in the days preceding the event. He entered Hell in a Cell with a massive spot of discolored skin, but despite the severe injury, managed to defeat Rollins for the third time. Four days later, it was announced that Rhodes underwent successful surgery to repair a torn right pectoral tendon, rendering him unable to compete for eight months.

On the January 16, 2023, episode of Raw, Rhodes announced in a pre-taped video that he would return to competition in the men's Royal Rumble match at Royal Rumble on January 28, which he won after lastly eliminating Gunther. On the following episode of Raw, Rhodes challenged Roman Reigns for the Undisputed WWE Universal Championship at WrestleMania 39. In the main event of the second night of WrestleMania, Rhodes was defeated by Reigns after interference from Solo Sikoa. The booking decision was met with divisive reactions from fans, journalists and other wrestlers.

Rhodes's next feud was against Brock Lesnar, defeating Lesnar at Backlash, but lost to him at Night of Champions. They have a third match at SummerSlam, where Rhodes defeated Lesnar, ending their feud. At Fastlane on October 7, Rhodes and Jey Uso won the Undisputed WWE Tag Team Championship from The Judgment Day (Finn Bálor and Damian Priest), becoming double champions in the process, before losing it nine days later against Balor and Priest. At Survivor Series: WarGames on November 25, Rhodes, Rollins, Jey Uso, Sami Zayn, and a returning Randy Orton defeated The Judgment Day (Damian Priest, Finn Bálor, Dominik Mysterio and JD McDonagh) and Drew McIntyre in a WarGames match. On the November 27 episode of Raw, Rhodes announced he would compete in the men's Royal Rumble match at Royal Rumble.

==== Undisputed WWE Champion (2024–present) ====
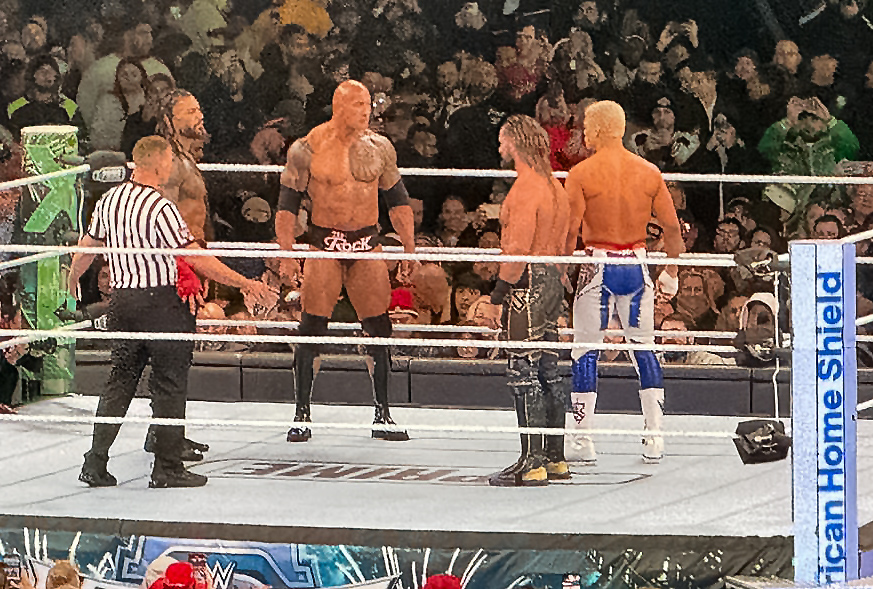
Rhodes and Seth Rollins face to face with Roman Reigns and The Rock on Night 1 of WrestleMania XL.

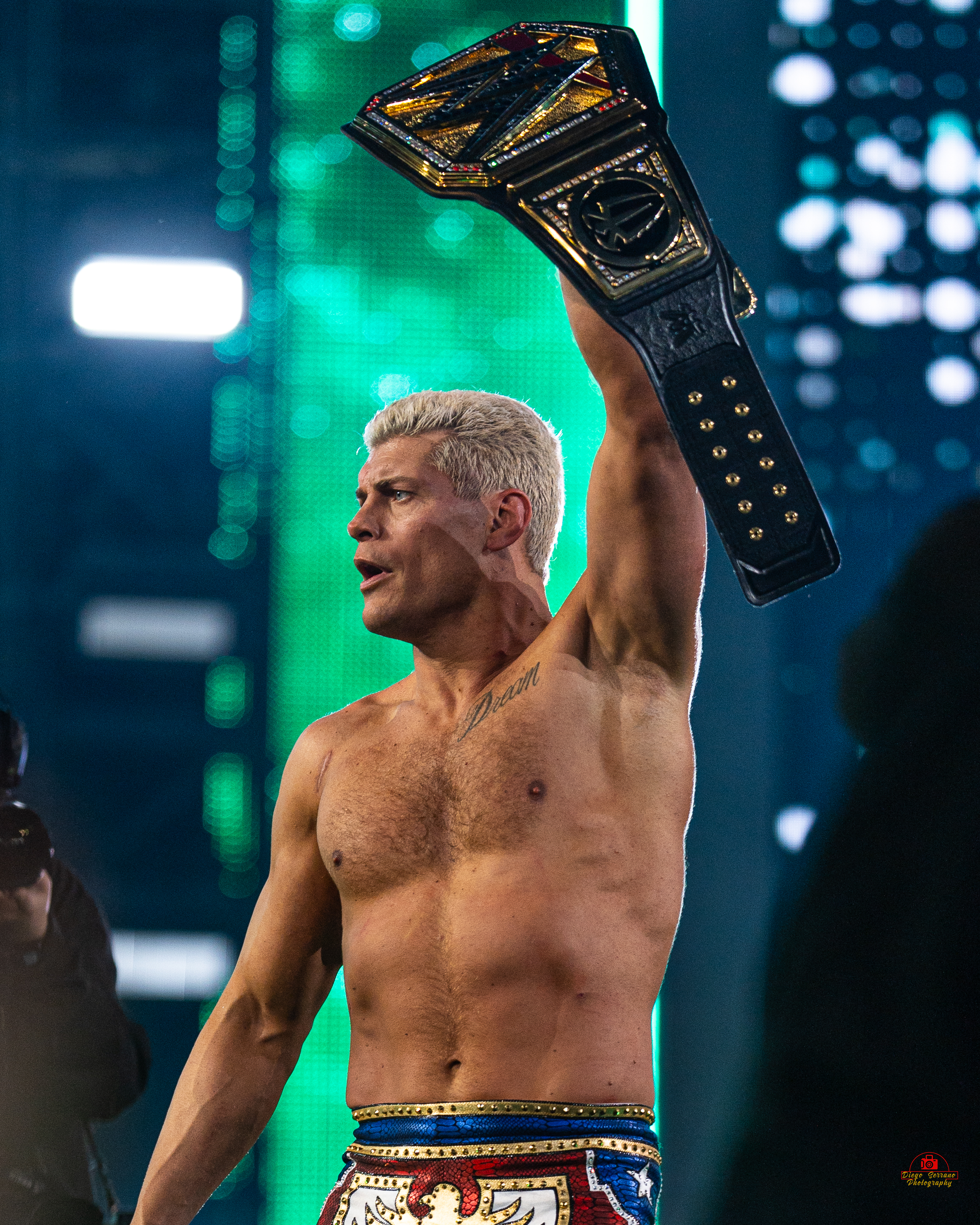
Rhodes defeated Roman Reigns on Night 2 of WrestleMania XL to win the Undisputed WWE Championship.

At the Royal Rumble event on January 27, 2024, Rhodes won the men's Royal Rumble match after lastly eliminating CM Punk. This was only the fourth time someone had won two consecutive Rumble matches, and the first time since Stone Cold Steve Austin won in 1997 and 1998. After Rhodes won, he pointed at Undisputed WWE Universal Champion Roman Reigns. On the February 2 episode of SmackDown, Rhodes said that he would not challenge Roman Reigns at WrestleMania XL. The Rock then appeared and confronted Reigns, with Rhodes shaking The Rock's hand and leaving the ring to Reigns and The Rock. This development drew backlash from fans on social media for disrupting Rhodes's long-term storyline with Reigns. During the WrestleMania XL Kickoff media event on February 8, Rhodes announced that he chose Reigns. After bringing up each other's families, The Rock turned heel and viciously slapped him in the face and joined the Bloodline. In the ensuing brawl, Rhodes was backed by World Heavyweight Champion Seth Rollins.

During Night 1 of WrestleMania XL on April 6, Rhodes and Rollins lost to The Rock and Reigns, meaning that on Night 2 of the event, Rhodes's match against Reigns would be a Bloodline Rules match. On Night 2, Rhodes suffered interferences from Bloodline members Jimmy Uso, Solo Sikoa, and The Rock, who were each countered by Rhodes' allies Jey Uso, John Cena, Rollins, and The Undertaker. Rhodes ultimately defeated Reigns for the Undisputed WWE Universal Championship to finish his story and capture his first world title in WWE. On the April 8 episode of Raw, just as Rhodes was addressing his win, he was interrupted by The Rock. After a brief exchange of both titles, The Rock announced that he would be taking time away. However, he issued a warning to Rhodes that once he returned, he would be returning for him.

As the title was the world championship of SmackDown, Rhodes was subsequently transferred to the brand, defending the title twice against AJ Styles at Backlash on May 4 and Clash at the Castle on June 15 in an "I Quit" match, and Logan Paul at King and Queen of the Ring on May 25. He also found himself in a feud with Solo Sikoa, successfully defending the title against him at SummerSlam on August 3 in a Bloodline Rules match and during the September 13 episode of SmackDown in a steel cage match.

At Crown Jewel on November 2, Rhodes defeated World Heavyweight Champion Gunther to win the inaugural WWE Crown Jewel Championship. Rhodes also feuded with Kevin Owens, retaining the title at Bash in Berlin on August 31. At Saturday Night's Main Event on December 14, Rhodes (who came out with the "Winged Eagle" version of the WWE Championship) retained the title against Owens. After the event went off the air, Rhodes was attacked by Owens, who took the Winged Eagle belt. At Royal Rumble on February 1, 2025, Rhodes defeated Owens in a Ladder match for the championship, with both belts on the line, ending their feud. On the February 21 episode of SmackDown, Rhodes began a storyline with The Rock, which involved The Rock cryptically stating that he wanted Rhodes's soul. At Elimination Chamber: Toronto on March 1, Rhodes rejected The Rock's offer, which then prompted Cena, who had just won the Elimination Chamber match to earn a title shot against Rhodes at WrestleMania 41, to attack Rhodes. On Night 2 of the event on April 20, Rhodes lost the title to Cena via interference from rapper Travis Scott, and a low blow from Cena, ending his reign at 378 days.

Following a month-long absence from television, Rhodes returned and won the 2025 King of the Ring tournament, defeating Randy Orton in the finals at Night of Champions on June 28, thus winning the tournament and earning an Undisputed WWE Championship match against Cena at SummerSlam. On Night 2 of the event on August 3, Rhodes defeated Cena in a Street Fight to win the Undisputed WWE Championship for a second time.

After taking one month off to film the movie Street Fighter, Rhodes feuded with Drew McIntyre, retaining the title against him at Wrestlepalooza on September 20 and Saturday Night's Main Event XLI on November 1. They also faced each other on opposing teams at Survivor Series: WarGames on November 29 in a WarGames match in a losing effort after interference from a mysterious hooded figure which was later revealed to be Austin Theory. Rhodes lost the title to McIntyre on the January 9, 2026, episode of SmackDown in a Three Stages of Hell match, due to interference from Jacob Fatu, ending Rhodes's second reign at 159 days.

At Saturday Night's Main Event XLIII on January 24, he was scheduled to face Fatu in a match that ultimately did not occur due to a brawl breaking out between the two before the match could officially take place, after which both men were attacked by McIntyre. Rhodes competed in the Royal Rumble match on January 31 and the Elimination Chamber match on February 28, but lost both matches after interferences from McIntyre. Rhodes defeated McIntyre to regain the title for a third time on the March 6 episode of SmackDown. At Night 1 of WrestleMania 42 on April 18, Rhodes successfully defended the title against Randy Orton. After the match, however, Rhodes was attacked by Orton with a punt kick. At Clash in Italy on May 31, Rhodes successfully retained the title against Gunther. At Night of Champions on June 27, Rhodes lost the title to Sami Zayn in a Triple Threat Match also involving Gunther ending his third reign at 113 days.

After the event, Rhodes started a feud with CM Punk who won the title from Zayn on the July 6 episode of Raw. On the July 10 episode of SmackDown, Rhodes challenged Punk to a title match at SummerSlam, where Rhodes lost after interference from a returning Orton. At Sunday Night's Main Event on September 6, in a WrestleMania rematch Rhodes lost to Orton. At Crown Jewel on November 7, Rhodes defeated Orton in an Last Man Standing match ending their feud.

== Other media ==
In July 2009, Rhodes became one of the faces of the Gillette "Be a Superstar" advertising campaign, along with Chris Jericho and John Cena. "Be a Superstar" was a four-month-long interactive campaign, which featured the wrestlers in numerous videos promoting Gillette Fusion products. In August 2009, Rhodes appeared on The Tonight Show with Conan O'Brien.

Rhodes guest-starred on Arrow in the fifth-season episode "A Matter of Trust" playing Derek Sampson, a drug dealer turned metahuman with the inability to feel pain (Sampson's drug of choice was named Stardust in homage to Rhodes's WWE persona). Rhodes reprised the role on episode 21 of the fifth season of Arrow. In July 2018, Rhodes announced that his character would return for Season 7; he appeared in five episodes during the season. Rhodes also voiced a fictionalized version of himself in the first episode of the 2023 animated series Captain Laserhawk: A Blood Dragon Remix.

Rhodes has appeared in 12 video games: he made his video game debut in WWE SmackDown vs. Raw 2009 and has since appeared in WWE SmackDown vs. Raw 2010, WWE SmackDown vs. Raw 2011, WWE All Stars (as DLC), WWE '12, WWE '13, WWE 2K14, WWE 2K15, WWE 2K23, WWE 2K25 and WWE 2K26 as Cody Rhodes, in WWE 2K16 and WWE 2K17 under the Stardust gimmick, and in WWE 2K24 as both gimmicks alongside his "Undashing" persona. Rhodes also appears in AEW Fight Forever, even though he left AEW before the game was released. Rhodes is the cover star for the WWE 2K24 standard edition and cross gen editions of the game.

On July 17, 2024, it was revealed that Rhodes would be one of three WWE wrestlers who would be added to Call of Duty: Modern Warfare III as playable multiplayer operators, alongside Rey Mysterio and Rhea Ripley.

In April 2025, Rhodes was added to Clash of Clans as a skin for the playable “hero” character, the Barbarian King, in the video game's ClashAMania event.

== Personal life ==
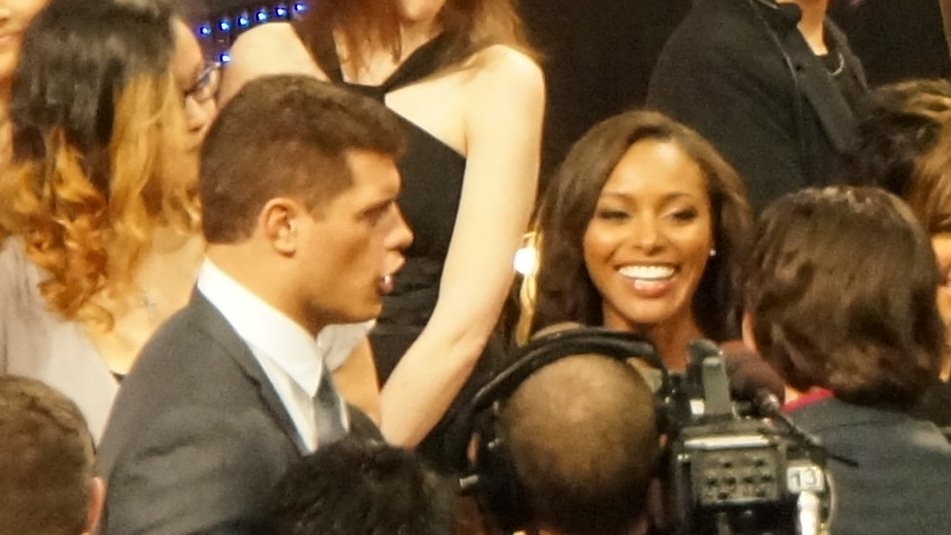
Rhodes with his wife Brandi in April 2014

Rhodes and his half-brother inducted their father into the WWE Hall of Fame on March 31, 2007.

In September 2013, Rhodes married ring announcer and former wrestler Brandi Reed. They have two children together, as well as a Siberian Husky named Pharaoh, who appeared alongside Rhodes on both AEW and WWE programming. Pharaoh died in September 2026.

Rhodes is an avid gamer and a big fan of both the Legend of Zelda and Metal Gear video game series, incorporating their styles into his wrestling gear. He has stated that he replays A Link to the Past yearly and that his favorite game in the series is Ocarina of Time, which he has proclaimed is also his favorite video game, with a close second being Metal Gear Solid. He is also a comic book fan and has worn wrestling gear inspired by X-Men characters Archangel and Mister Sinister. He has cited Omega Red and Cyclops as his favorite fictional characters, along with the Inhumans, and revealed that he owns a game cabinet of the 1992 arcade game X-Men. Rhodes is also a fan of the Star Wars franchise.

== Filmography ==
Film
Year	Title	Role	Notes
2016	Scooby-Doo! and WWE: Curse of the Speed Demon	Stardust	
2017	The Jetsons & WWE: Robo-WrestleMania!	Stardust	
2023	American Nightmare: Becoming Cody Rhodes	Himself	
2025	The Naked Gun	Bartender	
2026	Street Fighter	Guile	

Television
Year	Title	Role	Notes
2009	The Tonight Show with Conan O'Brien	Himself	Episode: "Mike Tyson and Keith Berry"
2010	Warehouse 13	Kurt Smoller	Season 2, episode 8: "Merge with Caution"
2011	Food Network Challenge	Himself	Season 12, episode 11: "WWE Wrestling Cakes"
2014	Surprise Surprise	Himself	Episode: "Mothers Day Edition"
2016–2018	Arrow	Derek Sampson	7 episodes Credited as Cody Runnels
2018	WAGS Atlanta	Himself	
2021–2022	Go-Big Show	Judge	
2021	Rhodes to the Top	Himself	
2023	Captain Laserhawk: A Blood Dragon Remix	Himself	
2024	The Tonight Show with Jimmy Fallon	Himself	Episode: "Ken Jeong"
2025	CBeebies Bedtime Stories	Himself	

Web series
Year	Title	Role	Notes
2013–2015	The JBL and Cole/Renee Show	Himself, Stardust	Series regular
2015–2016	Swerved	Himself, Stardust	Two episodes
2016–2022	Being The Elite	Himself	Series regular

Video game appearances
Year	Title	Notes
2008	WWE SmackDown vs. Raw 2009	Video game debut
2009	WWE SmackDown vs. Raw 2010	
2010	WWE SmackDown vs. Raw 2011	
2011	WWE '12	
2012	WWE '13	
2013	WWE 2K14	
2014	WWE SuperCard	
2014	WWE 2K15	
2015	WWE 2K16	
2016	WWE 2K17	
2017	WWE Champions	
2017	WWE Mayhem	
2021	AEW Elite General Manager	
2023	WWE 2K23	
2023	AEW Fight Forever	
2024	WWE 2K24	Cover athlete
2024	Call of Duty: Modern Warfare III	
2025	WWE 2K25	
2026	WWE 2K26	

== Championships and accomplishments ==
=== Amateur wrestling ===
- Georgia State Tournament
  - Champion at 189 pounds (86 kg) weight class (2003, 2004)

=== Professional wrestling ===
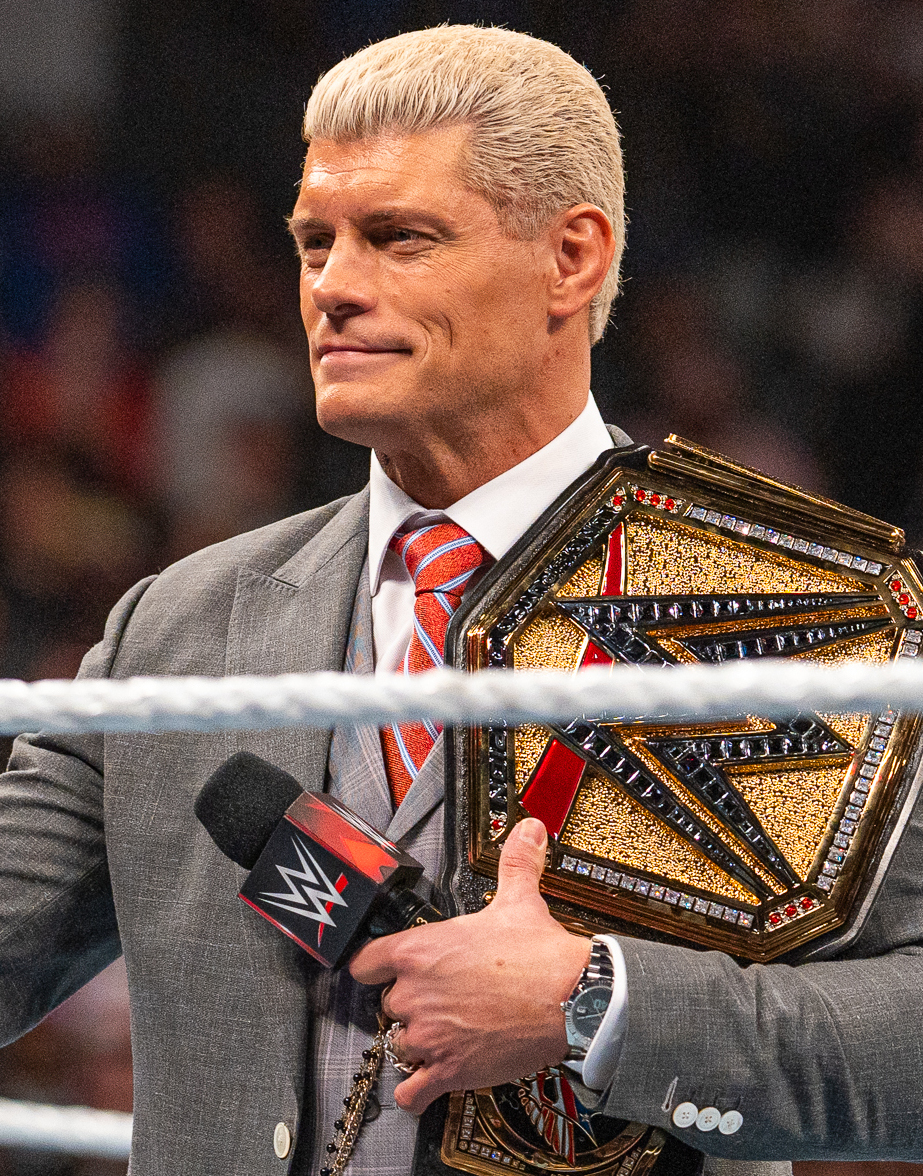
Rhodes is a three-time Undisputed WWE Champion...

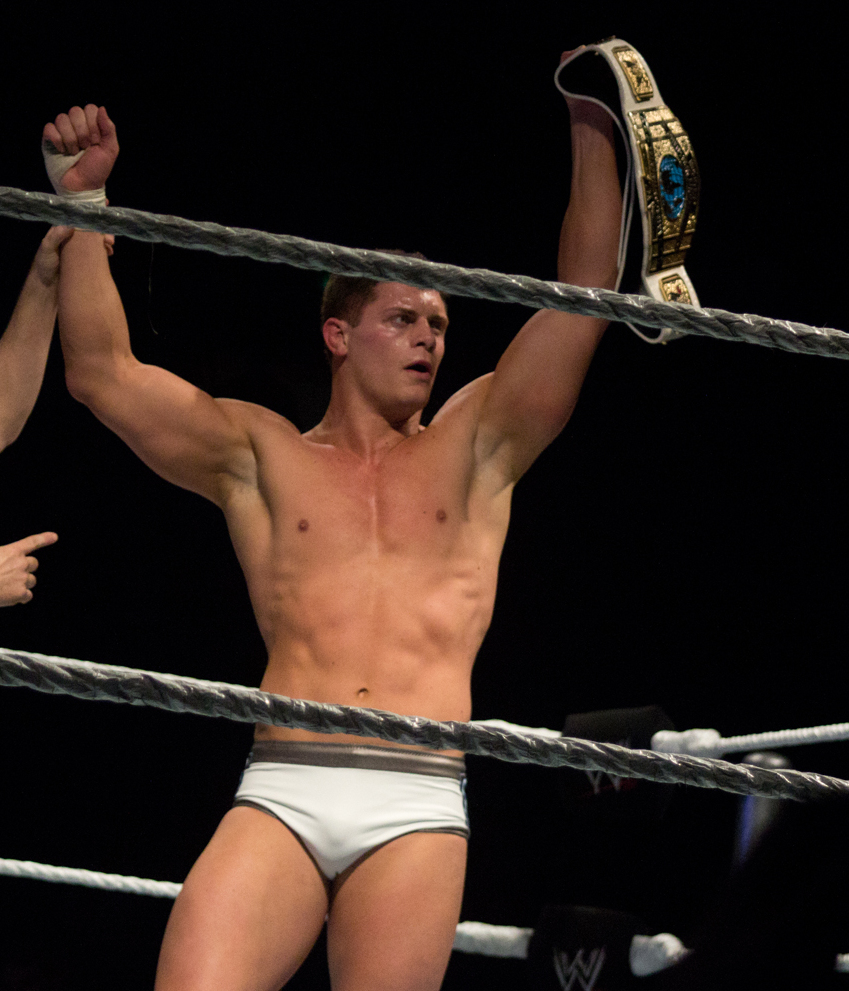
...a two-time Intercontinental Champion...

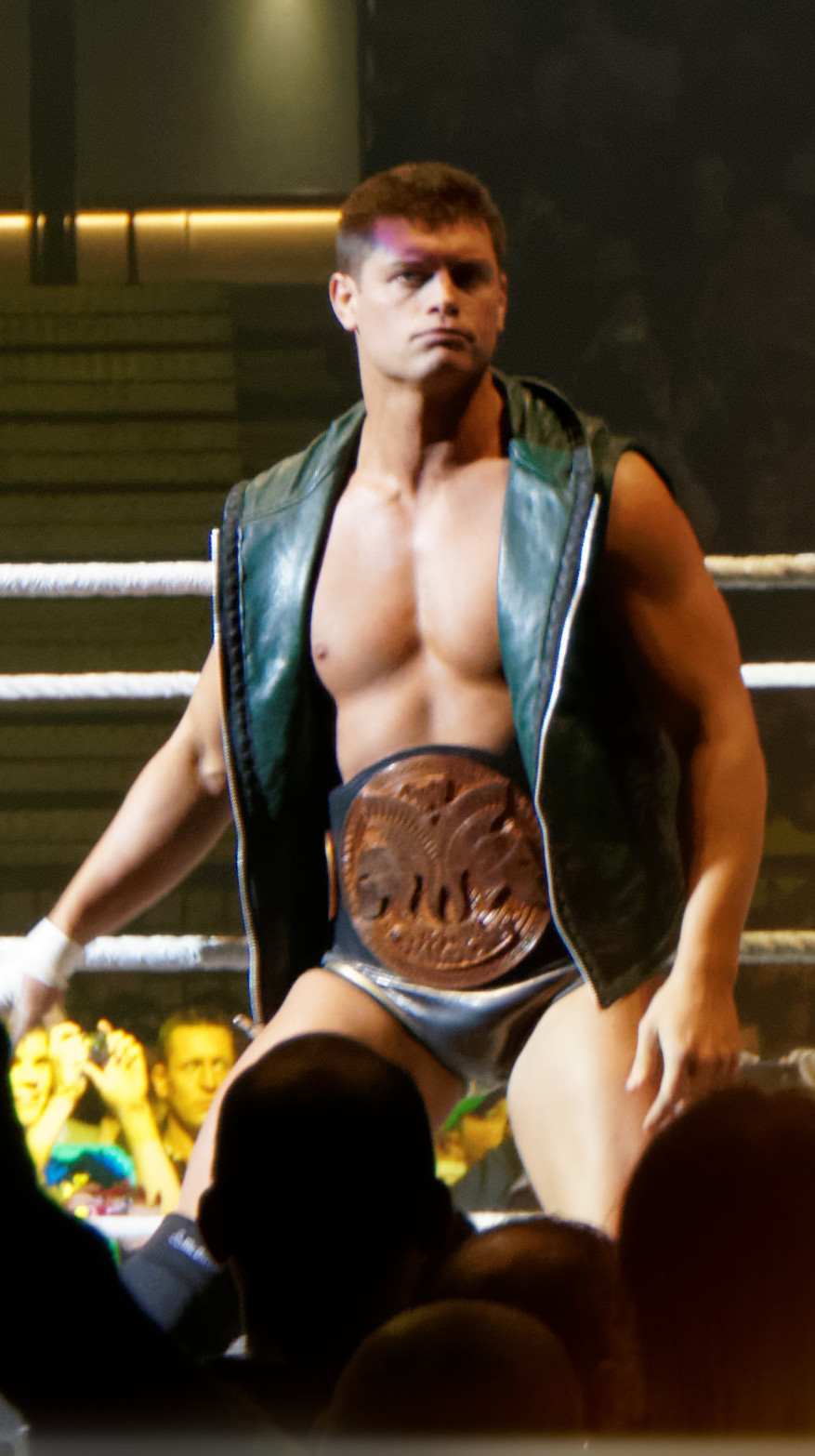
...and an overall eight-time Tag Team Champion in WWE.

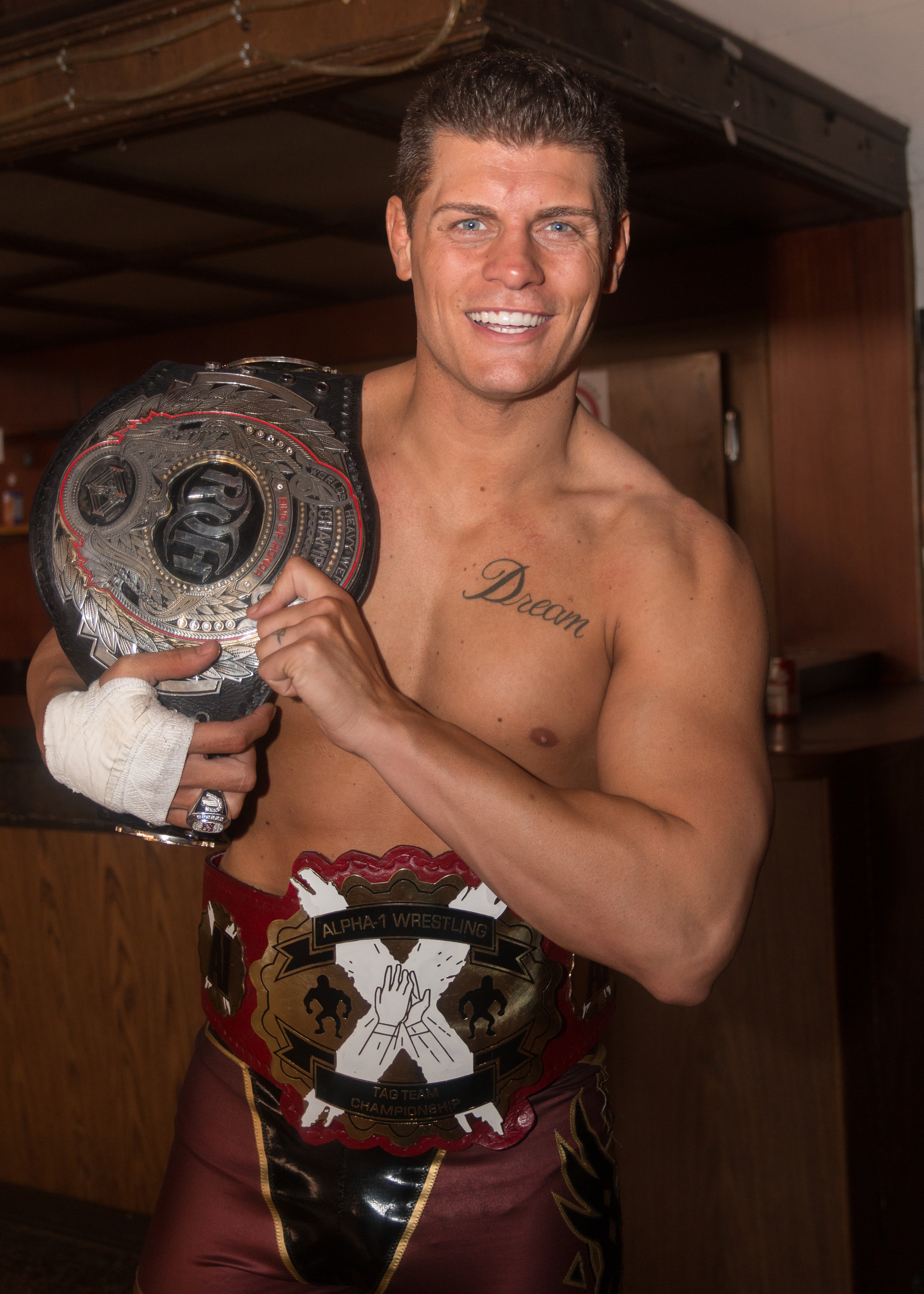
Outside of WWE, Rhodes is a former ROH World Champion (on shoulder), and Alpha-1 Tag Team Champion (around waist)...

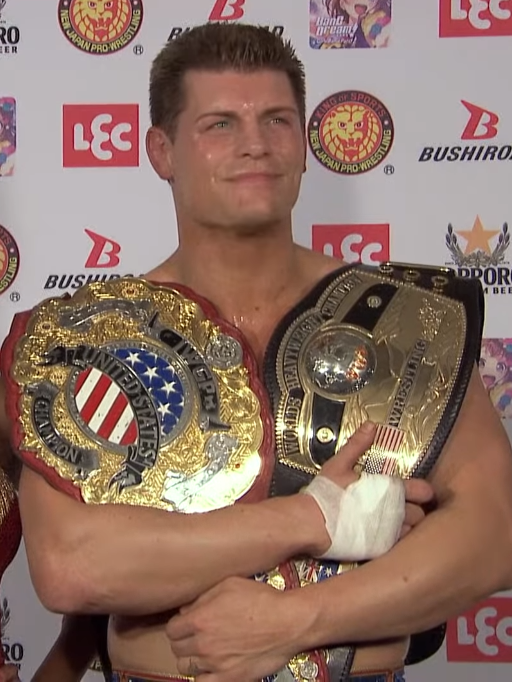
...a former IWGP United States Heavyweight Champion (right shoulder) and NWA World Heavyweight Champion (left shoulder)

- All Elite Wrestling
  - AEW TNT Championship (3 times, inaugural)
  - AEW Award (1 time)
    - Best Moment on the Mic (2021) – accepting Dog Collar match on AEW Dynamite (September 30)
- Alpha-1 Wrestling
  - A1 Tag Team Championship (1 time) – with Ethan Page
- Bullet Proof Wrestling
  - BPW Championship (1 time)
- CBS Sports
  - Promo of the Year (2019) – "Silver spoon" promo on AEW Dynamite (November 7)
  - Smack Talker of the Year (2019)
- ESPN
  - ESPY Award – Best WWE Moment (2022) – returning to WWE at WrestleMania 38
  - Male Wrestler of the Year (2023)
- Global Force Wrestling
  - GFW NEX*GEN Championship (1 time)
- National Wrestling Alliance
  - NWA World's Heavyweight Championship (1 time)
- New Japan Pro-Wrestling
  - IWGP United States Heavyweight Championship (1 time)
- New York Post
  - Male Wrestler of the Year (2024)
  - Match of the Year (2022) – vs. Seth "Freakin" Rollins on Hell in a Cell
  - Promo of the Year (2023) – shared with Sami Zayn on WWE Raw (February 13)
- Northeast Wrestling
  - NEW Heavyweight Championship (1 time)
- Ohio Valley Wrestling
  - OVW Heavyweight Championship (1 time)
  - OVW Television Championship (1 time)
  - OVW Southern Tag Team Championship (2 times) – with Shawn Spears
  - Fourth OVW Triple Crown Champion
- Pro Wrestling Illustrated
  - Match of the Year (2019) – vs. Dustin Rhodes at Double or Nothing
  - Match of the Year (2022) – vs. Seth Rollins at Hell in a Cell
  - Match of the Year (2024) – vs. Roman Reigns at WrestleMania XL
  - Match of the Year (2025) – vs. John Cena at SummerSlam
  - Most Improved Wrestler of the Year (2008)
  - Most Inspirational Wrestler of the Year (2024)
  - Most Popular Wrestler of the Year (2023, 2024)
  - Wrestler of the Year (2024, 2025)
  - Ranked No. 1 of the top 500 singles wrestlers in the PWI 500 in 2024 and 2025
- Ring of Honor
  - ROH World Championship (1 time)
  - ROH World Six-Man Tag Team Championship (1 time) – with The Young Bucks
  - ROH Year-End Award (2 times)
    - Wrestler of the Year (2017)
    - Feud of the Year (2018) – vs. Kenny Omega
- Sports Illustrated
  - Men's Wrestler of the Year (2018, 2024)
  - Wrestler of the Year (2023)
- What Culture Pro Wrestling
  - WCPW Internet Championship (1 time)
- Wrestling Observer Newsletter
  - Best Box Office Draw (2024)
  - United States/Canada MVP (2023, 2024)
  - Worst Gimmick (2015) – as Stardust
  - Worst Match of the Year (2025) vs. John Cena at WrestleMania 41
  - Wrestler of the Year (2024)
  - Wrestling Observer Newsletter Hall of Fame (2025)
- WWE
  - Undisputed WWE Championship (3 times)
  - WWE Universal Championship (1 time, unrecognized) (Note: WWE had previously recognized Rhodes as Universal Champion during his first Undisputed WWE Championship reign; however, after he lost the title to John Cena at WrestleMania 41, the recognition was amended. WWE retroactively declared the Universal Championship retired at the moment Rhodes defeated Roman Reigns to win the Undisputed WWE Championship at WrestleMania XL.)
  - WWE Intercontinental Championship (2 times)
  - WWE Raw Tag Team Championship (Note: The title was named the WWE Tag Team Championship during his first three reigns. During his fourth reign, it was held in tandem with the SmackDown Tag Team Championship as the Undisputed WWE Tag Team Championship.) (4 times) – with Drew McIntyre (1), Goldust (2) and Jey Uso (1)
  - WWE SmackDown Tag Team Championship (1 time) – with Jey Uso (Note: It was held in tandem with the Raw Tag Team Championship as the Undisputed WWE Tag Team Championship.)
  - World Tag Team Championship (3 times) – with Hardcore Holly (1) and Ted DiBiase (2)
  - Men's Royal Rumble (2023, 2024)
  - King of the Ring (2025)
  - Crown Jewel Championship (2024)
  - 34th Triple Crown Champion
  - Slammy Award (9 times)
    - Best Entrance of the Year (2024)
    - Male Superstar of the Year (2024, 2025)
    - Match of the Year (2025) – vs. Roman Reigns at WrestleMania XL
    - Mic drop of the Year (2025) – telling The Rock "Go F*** Yourself"
    - Most Memorable Entrance (2025) – at WrestleMania XL
    - Outstanding Achievement of Baby Oil Application (2010)
    - Rivalry of the Year (2024) – vs. Roman Reigns
    - Tag Team of the Year (2013) – with Goldust
