= The New Beginning in Osaka (2018) =

2018 New Japan Pro-Wrestling event

- Promotion: New Japan Pro-Wrestling
- Date: February 10, 2018
- City: Osaka, Osaka, Japan
- Venue: Osaka Prefectural Gymnasium

Event chronology
← Previous; Road to The New Beginning	Next → New Japan Road; Honor Rising: Japan 2018

The New Beginning chronology
← Previous; Sapporo 2018	Next → Sapporo 2019

The New Beginning in Osaka (2018) is a professional wrestling event promoted by New Japan Pro-Wrestling (NJPW). The event took place on February 10, 2018, in Osaka, Osaka, at the Osaka Prefectural Gymnasium and featured nine matches, three of which were contested for championships.

In the main event, Kazuchika Okada defended the IWGP Heavyweight Championship against Sanada. This was the fourteenth event under the New Beginning name and the sixth to take place in Osaka.

== Production ==
Other on-screen personnel
Role:	Name:
Commentators	Don Callis (English-language announcer)
Commentators	Kevin Kelly (English-language announcer)
Ring announcers	Makoto Abe
Referees	Kenta Sato
Referees	Marty Asami
Referees	Red Shoes Unno
Referees	Tiger Hattori

=== Background ===
The event will air worldwide on NJPW's internet streaming site, NJPW World, with English commentary provided by Kevin Kelly and Don Callis.

=== Storylines ===
The New Beginning in Osaka will feature nine professional wrestling matches, which will involve different wrestlers from pre-existing scripted feuds and storylines. The final five matches on the card feature Chaos and Los Ingobernables de Japón taking on one another in singles matches. Wrestlers portray villains, heroes, or less distinguishable characters in the scripted events that build tension and culminate in a wrestling match or series of matches.

== Results ==
No.	Results	Stipulations	Times
1	Yuji Nagata defeated Katsuya Kitamura	Singles match	10:58
2	Suzuki-gun (El Desperado and Yoshinobu Kanemaru) defeated Roppongi 3K (Sho and Yoh)	Tag team match	10:22
3	Taguchi Japan (Ryusuke Taguchi and Kushida), Michael Elgin and Togi Makabe defeated Suzuki-gun (Taka Michinoku, Taichi, Takashi Iizuka and Minoru Suzuki)	Eight-man tag team match	11:52
4	Chaos (Toru Yano, Tomohiro Ishii and Jay White) defeated Taguchi Japan (David Finlay, Juice Robinson and Toa Henare)	Six-man tag team match	7:33
5	Bushi defeated Gedo	Singles match	10:07
6	Tetsuya Naito defeated Yoshi-Hashi	Singles match	16:46
7	Will Ospreay (c) defeated Hiromu Takahashi	Singles match for the IWGP Junior Heavyweight Championship	20:05
8	Hirooki Goto (c) defeated Evil	Singles match for the NEVER Openweight Championship	20:19
9	Kazuchika Okada (c) defeated Sanada	Singles match for the IWGP Heavyweight Championship	32:12
(c) / – the champion(s) heading into the match
