= The New Beginning in Sapporo (2018) =

2018 New Japan Pro-Wrestling event

- Promotion: New Japan Pro-Wrestling
- Date: January 27-28, 2018
- City: Sapporo, Hokkaido, Japan
- Venue: Hokkaido Prefectural Sports Center
- Attendance: Night 1: 4,862; Night 2: 5,140

Event chronology
← Previous; Road to the New Beginning; Fantastica Mania 2018	Next → Road to The New Beginning

The New Beginning chronology
← Previous; Osaka 2017	Next → Osaka 2018

The New Beginning in Sapporo (2018) was a professional wrestling event promoted by New Japan Pro-Wrestling (NJPW). The event took place on January 27 and 28, 2018, in Sapporo, Hokkaido, at the Hokkaido Prefectural Sports Center. The first night of the event featured nine matches, two of which were contested for championships, while the second night featured two championship matches out of nine matches overall.

In the main event of the first night, Minoru Suzuki defeated Hiroshi Tanahashi to become the new IWGP Intercontinental Champion, and on the second night Jay White defeated Kenny Omega to become the new IWGP United States Heavyweight Champion. This was the thirteenth event under the New Beginning name and the second to take place in Sapporo.

== Production ==
Other on-screen personnel
Role:	Name:
Commentators	Don Callis (English-language announcer)
Commentators	Kevin Kelly (English-language announcer)
Ring announcers	Makoto Abe
Referees	Kenta Sato
Referees	Marty Asami
Referees	Red Shoes Unno
Referees	Tiger Hattori

=== Background ===
In recent years, NJPW has held the opening day of the G1 Climax tournament in Sapporo. With The New Beginning in Sapporo, the promotion revived an old tradition of holding a show during the annual Sapporo Snow Festival, resulting in the show being promoted under the subtitle Fukkatsu! Yuki no Sapporo Kessen (復活！雪の札幌決戦, "Revival! Sapporo Showdown in Snow"). The event aired worldwide on NJPW's internet streaming site, NJPW World, with English commentary provided by Kevin Kelly and Don Callis, the latter of whom replaced Kelly's previous broadcast partner Steve Corino.

=== Storylines ===
The New Beginning in Sapporo featured nine professional wrestling matches for each night, which involved different wrestlers from pre-existing scripted feuds and storylines. Wrestlers portrayed villains, heroes, or less distinguishable characters in the scripted events that built tension and culminated in a wrestling match or series of matches.

At New Year’s Dash Kenny Omega tried to bring “Switchblade” Jay White into the Bullet Club. White seemingly accepted the offer but rejected it hitting Omega with “Blade Runner”. The next day White joined Chaos and a match between the two was made with the IWGP United States Heavyweight Championship on the line.

== Results ==
=== Night 1 ===
No.	Results	Stipulations	Times
1	Michael Elgin defeated Katsuya Kitamura	Singles match	8:04
2	Jyushin Thunder Liger, Kushida, Hiroyoshi Tenzan, Ryusuke Taguchi, and Tiger Mask IV defeated Suzuki-gun (El Desperado, Taichi, Taka Michinoku, Takashi Iizuka, and Yoshinobu Kanemaru)	Ten-man tag team match	8:06
3	Chaos (Tomohiro Ishii and Toru Yano) defeated Bullet Club (Chase Owens and Yujiro Takahashi)	Tag team match	7:06
4	Bullet Club (Bad Luck Fale, Tama Tonga, and Tanga Loa) (c) defeated Taguchi Japan (Toa Henare, Ryusuke Taguchi, and Togi Makabe)	Six-man tag team match for the NEVER Openweight 6-Man Tag Team Championship	9:15
5	Bullet Club (Cody, Hangman Page, and Marty Scurll) defeated Taguchi Japan (David Finlay, Juice Robinson), and Kota Ibushi	Six-man tag team match	10:47
6	Los Ingobernables de Japón (Hiromu Takahashi and Tetsuya Naito) defeated Chaos (Will Ospreay and Yoshi-Hashi)	Tag team match	11:19
7	Chaos (Gedo, Hirooki Goto, and Kazuchika Okada) defeated Los Ingobernables de Japón (Bushi, Evil and Sanada)	Six-man tag team match	11:54
8	The Elite (Kenny Omega, Matt Jackson, and Nick Jackson) defeated Chaos (Jay White, Sho, and Yoh)	Six-man tag team match	10:53
9	Minoru Suzuki defeated Hiroshi Tanahashi (c) by referee stoppage	Singles match for the IWGP Intercontinental Championship	32:28
(c) / – the champion(s) heading into the match

=== Night 2 ===
No.	Results	Stipulations	Times
1	Juice Robinson defeated Katsuya Kitamura	Singles match	9:16
2	Suzuki-gun (El Desperado, Taichi, Taka Michinoku, and Yoshinobu Kanemaru) defeated Jyushin Thunder Liger, Ryusuke Taguchi, Shota Umino, and Tiger Mask IV	Eight-man tag team match	8:32
3	Chaos (Tomohiro Ishii and Toru Yano) defeated Bullet Club (HIKULEO and Yujiro Takahashi)	Tag team match	6:16
4	Bullet Club (Bad Luck Fale, Chase Owens, Tama Tonga, and Tanga Loa) defeated Tomoyuki Oka, Hiroyoshi Tenzan, Manabu Nakanishi, and Togi Makabe	Eight-man tag team match	9:04
5	Suzuki-gun (Minoru Suzuki and Takashi Iizuka) defeated Toa Henare and Michael Elgin	Tag team match	8:18
6	Bullet Club (Cody, Hangman Page, and Marty Scurll) defeated David Finlay, Kota Ibushi, and Kushida	Six-man tag team match	10:30
7	Los Ingobernables de Japón (Bushi, Evil, Hiromu Takahashi, Sanada and Tetsuya Naito) defeated Chaos (Gedo, Hirooki Goto, Kazuchika Okada, Will Ospreay, and Yoshi-Hashi)	Ten-man tag team match	12:19
8	Roppongi 3K (Sho and Yoh) defeated The Young Bucks (Matt Jackson and Nick Jackson) (c)	Tag team match for the IWGP Junior Heavyweight Tag Team Championship	22:34
9	Jay White defeated Kenny Omega (c)	Singles match for the IWGP United States Heavyweight Championship	29:54
(c) / – the champion(s) heading into the match
