= Guerra de Titanes (January 2018) =

2018 Lucha Libre AAA World Wide event

- Official poster for the January 2018 Guerra de Titanes
- Promotion: Lucha Libre AAA World Wide
- Date: January 26, 2018
- City: Mexico City, Mexico
- Venue: Gimnasio Juan de la Barrera

Pay-per-view chronology
← Previous; Lucha Libre World Cup	Next → Rey de Reyes

Guerra de Titanes chronology
← Previous; 2017	Next → December 2018

Guerra de Titanes (Spanish for "War of the Titans") was a major professional wrestling event scripted and produced by Lucha Libre AAA World Wide (AAA), a Mexican promotion. The event was the twenty-first annual Guerra de Titanes show which, until 2015, has traditionally been AAA's "end of the year" show. In 2016 the show was shifted from December to January instead. The show was held in Gimnasio Juan de la Barrera in Mexico City, Mexico which also hosted the 2016 and 2017 Guerra de Titanes shows.

In the main event, El Hijo del Fantasma successfully defended the AAA Latin American Championship against El Texano Jr. The original main event match was moved down one stop for unexplained reasons and saw Rey Wagner defeated Johnny Mundo for winner the AAA Mega Championship. The event was also notable for the surprise appearance of the formers CMLL stars Máximo and La Máscara following then the match between Psycho Clown and Rey Escorpión.

== Background ==
Starting in 1997 the Mexican professional wrestling, company AAA has held a major wrestling show late in the year, either November or December, called Guerra de Titanes ("War of the Titans"). The show often features championship matches or Lucha de Apuestas or bet matches where the competitors risked their wrestling mask or hair on the outcome of the match. In Lucha Libre the Lucha de Apuetas match is considered more prestigious than a championship match and a lot of the major shows feature one or more Apuesta matches. The Guerra de Titanes show is hosted by a new location each year, emanating from cities such as Madero, Chihuahua, Chihuahua, Mexico City, Guadalajara, Jalisco and more. In 2016 AAA moved the Guerra de Titanes show to January, with the 2017 version continuing that trend.

== Results ==
No.	Results	Stipulations
1	Australian Suicide defeated Lanzeloth (c)	Singles match for the AAA World Cruiserweight Championship
2	Faby Apache defeated Lady Shani (c)	Single match for the AAA Reina de Reinas Championship
3	Dark Cuervo, Dark Scoria and La Parka defeated Totalmente Traidores (Monster Clown, Murder Clown and Dave the Clown)	Street Fight tag team match
4	El Nuevo Poder del Norte (Carta Brava Jr., Tito Santana y Mocho Cota Jr.) defeated Los OGT's (Averno, Chessman and Super Fly) (c), Aerostar, Drago and Raptor and Máscara de Bronce, Angelikal and Bengala	Fatal 4-Way Match elimination match for the AAA World Trios Championship
5	Psycho Clown defeated Rey Escorpión by disqualification	Bull terrier match
6	Rey Wagner defeated Johnny Mundo (c)	Single match for the AAA Mega Championship with Vampiro as special guest referee
7	El Hijo del Fantasma (c) defeated El Texano Jr. by disqualification	Steel cage match for the AAA Latin American Championship
(c) / – the champion(s) heading into the match

== See also ==
- 2018 in professional wrestling
