= Rey de Reyes (2018) =

2018 Lucha Libre AAA World Wide event

- Official poser for the 2018 Rey de Reyes show
- Promotion: Lucha Libre AAA World Wide
- Date: March 4, 2018
- City: Puebla, Puebla, Mexico
- Venue: Acrópolis Puebla
- Attendance: 11.340

Event chronology
← Previous; Guerra de Titanes	Next → Verano de Escándalo

Rey de Reyes chronology
← Previous; 2017	Next → 2019

The 2018 Rey de Reyes (Spanish for "King of Kings") was a professional wrestling event produced by the Lucha Libre AAA World Wide, or simply AAA, promotion. The 2018 version was the 22nd year in a row that AAA has held a Rey de Reyes show and tournament. Previous Rey de Reyes tournaments consisted of several rounds, but for 2018, which was won by Rey Escorpión.

In the main event of the reshuffled card El Hijo del Fantasma defeated El Texano Jr. in a Lucha de Apuestas, or bet match, forcing Texano Jr. to have all his hair shaved off after the match.

== Production ==
=== Background ===
Starting in 1997 and every year since then the Mexican Lucha Libre, or professional wrestling, company AAA has held a Rey de Reyes (Spanish for "King of Kings') show in the spring. The 1997 version was held in February, while all subsequent Rey de Reyes shows were held in March. As part of their annual Rey de Reyes event AAA holds the eponymious Rey de Reyes tournament to determine that specific year's Rey. Most years the show hosts both the qualifying round and the final match, but on occasion the qualifying matches have been held prior to the event as part of AAA's weekly television shows. The traditional format consists of four preliminary rounds, each a Four-man elimination match with each of the four winners face off in the tournament finals, again under elimination rules. There have been years where AAA has employed a different format to determine a winner. The winner of the'Rey de Reyes tournament is given a large ornamental sword to symbolize their victory, but is normally not guaranteed any other rewards for winning the tournament, although some years becoming the Rey de Reyes has earned the winner a match for the AAA Mega Championship. From 1999 through 2009 AAA also held an annual Reina de Reinas ("Queen of Queens") tournament, but later turned that into an actual championship that could be defended at any point during the year, abandoning the annual tournament concept. The 2018 show will be the 22nd Rey de Reyes show in the series.

=== Storylines ===
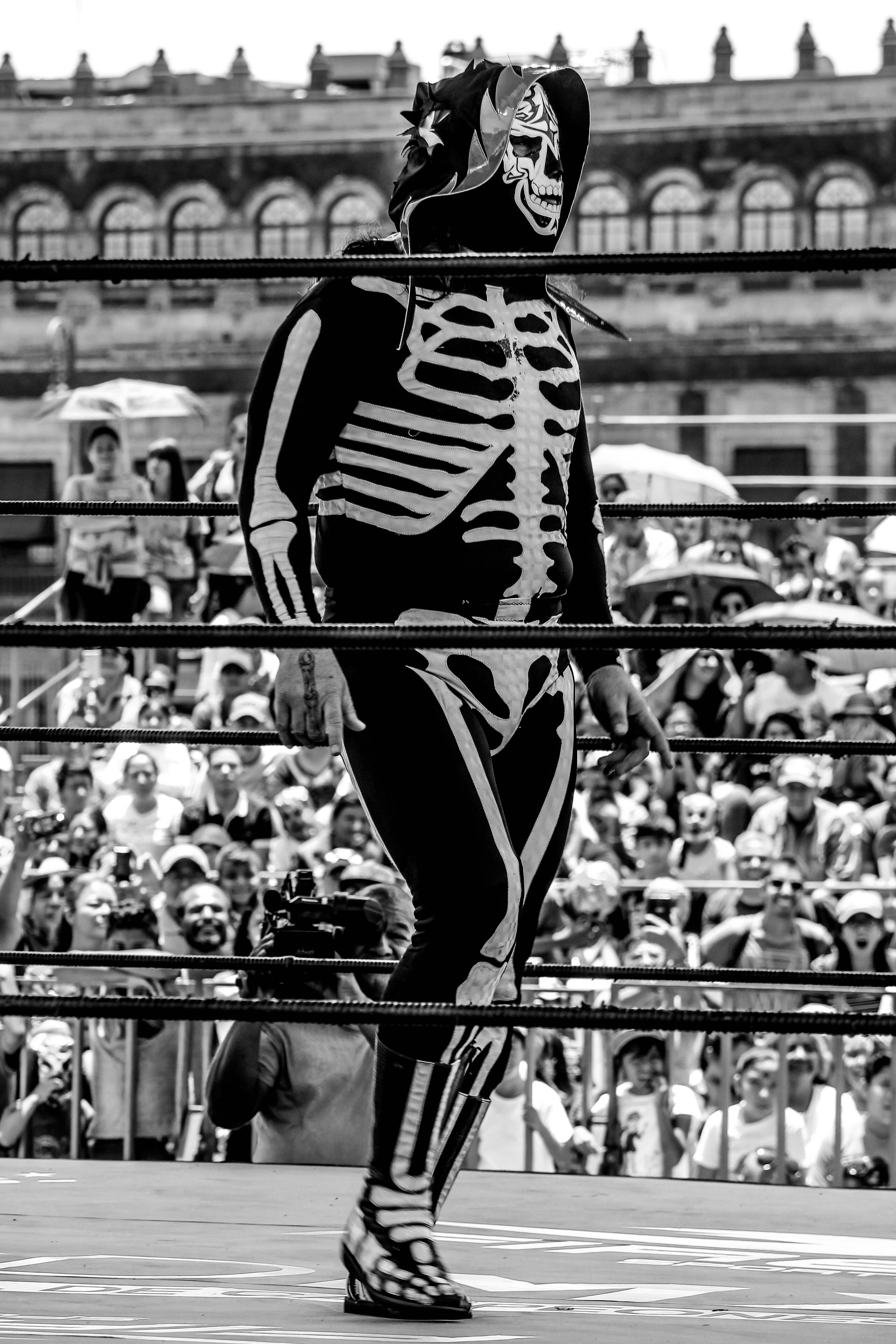
La Parka, one of the for Rey de Reyes finalists

The 2018 Rey de Reyes show featured nine professional wrestling matches with different wrestlers involved in pre-existing, scripted feuds, plots, and storylines. Wrestlers were portrayed as either heels (referred to as rudos in Mexico, those that portray the "bad guys") or faces (técnicos in Mexico, the "good guy" characters) as they followed a series of tension-building events, which culminated in a wrestling match or series of matches.

== Results ==
No.	Results	Stipulations	Times
1	Faby Apache defeated Lady Shani	Singles match	5:44
2	Rey Escorpión defeated Angelikal, Dave the Clown and Pimpinela Escarlata	Rey de Reyes tournament semi-final fatal-4-way	7:12
3	Bengala defeated Escoria, Máscara de Bronce, and Argenis	Rey de Reyes tournament semi-final fatal-4-way	6:50
4	El Hijo del Vikingo defeated Dark Cuervo, Pagano and Ángel Mortal Jr.	Rey de Reyes tournament semi-final fatal-4-way	8:42
5	La Parka defeated Dinastía, El Mesías and Venum	Rey de Reyes tournament semi-final fatal-4-way	7:24
6	El Nuevo Poder del Norte (Carta Brava Jr., Tito Santana and Mocho Cota Jr.) (c) defeated Los OGT's (Averno, Chessman and Super Fly)	Tables, Ladders, and Chairs match for the AAA World Trios Championship	13:53
7	Rey Escorpión defeated Bengala, El Hijo del Vikingo and La Parka	Rey de Reyes tournament final Fatal-4-Way	—
8	Totalmente Traidores (Monster Clown and Murder Clown), El Hijo de Dr. Wagner Jr. and Hernandez defeated Los Mosqueteros del Diablo (Psycho Clown, La Máscara and Máximo) and Rey Wagner	Eight-man tag team match	10:12
9	El Hijo del Fantasma (mask) defeated El Texano Jr. (hair)	Lucha de Apuestas, mask vs. hair match	12:57
(c) / – the champion(s) heading into the match

=== Tournament bracket ===
1st Round; Rey de Reyes; March 4, 2018
Angelikal	—
Dave the Clown	—
Pimpinela Escarlata	7:12
Rey Escorpión	Win
Argenis	6:50
Bengala	Win
Escoria	—
Máscara de Bronce	—
Ángel Mortal Jr.	—
Dark Cuervo	—
El Hijo del Vikingo	Win
Pagano	8:42
Dinastía	—
El Mesías	—
La Parka	Win
Venum	7:24

Final; Rey de Reyes; March 4, 2018
Rey Escorpión	Win
Bengala	—
El Hijo del Vikingo	—
La Parka	—

== See also ==
- 2018 in professional wrestling
