= Guerra de Titanes (December 2018) =

2018 Lucha Libre AAA World Wide event

- Official poster for the December Guerra de Titanes
- Promotion: Lucha Libre AAA World Wide
- Date: December 2, 2018
- City: Aguascalientes, Aguascalientes, Mexico
- Venue: Palenque de la Feria
- Attendance: 5,000

Pay-per-view chronology
| ← Previous; Héroes Inmortales XII | Next → Rey de Reyes |

Guerra de Titanes chronology
| ← Previous; January 2018 | Next → 2019 |

Guerra de Titanes (Spanish for "War of the Titans") was a professional wrestling event produced by the Lucha Libre AAA World Wide (AAA) promotion, The event took place on December 2, 2018, in Aguascalientes, Aguascalientes, Mexico. The event was the twenty-second Guerra de Titanes end of the year show promoted by AAA since 1997. This was the final event broadcast by Televisa because the company left on February 1, 2019, after 27 years.

== Background ==
Starting in 1997 the Mexican professional wrestling, company AAA has held a major wrestling show late in the year, either November or December, called Guerra de Titanes ("War of the Titans"). The show often features championship matches or Lucha de Apuestas or bet matches where the competitors risked their wrestling mask or hair on the outcome of the match. In Lucha Libre the Lucha de Apuetas match is considered more prestigious than a championship match and a lot of the major shows feature one or more Apuesta matches. The Guerra de Titanes show is hosted by a new location each year, emanating from cities such as Madero, Chihuahua, Chihuahua, Mexico City, Guadalajara, Jalisco and more. In 2016 AAA moved the Guerra de Titanes show to January, with the 2017 version continuing that trend.

=== Storylines ===
The Guerra de Titanes show will feature eight professional wrestling matches with different wrestlers involved in pre-existing scripted feuds, plots and storylines. Wrestlers portrayed either heels (referred to as rudos in Mexico, those that portray the "bad guys") or faces (técnicos in Mexico, the "good guy" characters) as they followed a series of tension-building events, which culminated in a wrestling match or series of matches.

== Results ==
| No. | Results | Stipulations | Times |
|---|---|---|---|
| 1^{P} | Arkángel Divino, Discovery and Dark Finder defeated Extreme X, Principe Seir and Ultimo Maldito | Tag team match | 10:31 |
| 2 | Lady Shani defeated Faby Apache (c) and La Hiedra and Scarlett Bordeaux | Four-way match for the AAA Reina de Reinas Championship | 6:59 |
| 3 | La Máscara, Taurus & La Parka Negra defeated Mamba, Máximo and Pimpinela Escarlata | Tag team match | 9:04 |
| 4 | El Hijo del Vikingo, Laredo Kid and Myzteziz Jr. defeated El Nuevo Poder del Norte (Carta Brava Jr., Mocho Cota Jr., and Tito Santana) (c) | Tag team match for the AAA World Trios Championship | 10:26 |
| 5 | Myzteziz Jr., La Parka and Laredo Kid defeated Los OGT's (Averno, Chessman, and Super Fly) by disqualification | Tag team match | 5:30 |
| 6 | Los Mercenarios (Rey Escorpión and El Texano Jr.) (c) defeated Joe Líder and Pagano and Los Macizos (Cíclope and Miedo Extremo) | Three-way Extreme Rules tag team match for the AAA World Tag Team Championship | 17:28 |
| 7 | Drago defeated El Hijo del Fantasma (c) | Singles match for the AAA Latin American Championship | 14:34 |
| 8 | Blue Demon Jr. and Killer Kross defeated Psycho Clown and Rey Wagner | Tag team match | 10:13 |
(c) / – the champion(s) heading into the match; P / – the match was broadcast on the pre-show

== See also ==
- 2018 in professional wrestling
