= 2018 in professional wrestling =

2018 in professional wrestling describes the year's events in the world of professional wrestling.

== List of notable promotions ==
These promotions held notable events in 2018.

| Promotion Name | Abbreviation | Notes |
|---|---|---|
| Consejo Mundial de Lucha Libre | CMLL | |
| DDT Pro-Wrestling | DDT | |
| Impact Wrestling | Impact | |
| International Wrestling Revolution Group | IWRG | |
| Lucha Libre AAA Worldwide | AAA | The "AAA" abbreviation has been used since the mid-1990s and had previously stood for the promotion's original name Asistencia Asesoría y Administración. |
| Lucha Libre Elite | Elite | |
| Major League Wrestling | MLW | |
| National Wrestling Alliance | NWA | |
| New Japan Pro-Wrestling | NJPW | |
| Pro Wrestling Guerrilla | PWG | |
| Revolution Pro Wrestling | RevPro | |
| Ring of Honor | ROH | |
| The Crash Lucha Libre | The Crash | |
| World Wrestling Council | WWC | |
| WWE | — | WWE stands for World Wrestling Entertainment, which is still the legal name, but the company ceased using the full name in April 2011, with the WWE abbreviation becoming an orphaned initialism. WWE divided its roster into five storyline divisions – referred to as brands where wrestlers exclusively performed on their respective weekly television programs. Raw and SmackDown were their two main brands. Specialty brand 205 Live, which separated from Raw to become its own brand following WrestleMania 34, was also featured on WWE's main pay-per-views. NXT served as WWE's developmental territory, while specialty brand NXT UK was launched in July and promoted under the NXT banner. |

== Calendar of notable shows ==
=== January ===
| Date | Promotion(s) | Event | Location | Main Event | Notes |
|---|---|---|---|---|---|
| 1 | CMLL | Sin Piedad | Mexico City | Negro Casas defeated Sam Adonis in a Lucha de Apuestas, hair vs. hair match | |
| 1 | IWRG | IWRG 22nd Anniversary Show | Naucalpan, Mexico | Impossible (c) defeated Dr. Cerebro in a Steel cage match for the IWRG Rey del Ring Championship | |
| 4 | NJPW | Wrestle Kingdom 12 | Tokyo, Japan | Kazuchika Okada (c) defeated Tetsuya Naito in a Singles match to retain the IWGP Heavyweight Championship | First NJPW event to feature Chris Jericho in nearly two decades |
| 7 | IWRG | Zona de Ejecucion | Naucalpan, State of Mexico, Mexico | Aramis defeated Black Dragon, Alas de Acero, Diablo Jr., Dinamic Black, Dragon Fly, El Hijo del Alebrije, Pantera I, Eterno, Freelance, Heddi Karaoui, Imposible, Tortuga Leo, Tortuga Mike, Tortuga Rafy, and Tortuga Teelo | |
| 19 | CMLL; NJPW | Fantastica Mania (Tokyo shows) | Tokyo, Japan | Niebla Roja (c) defeated Gran Guerrero for the CMLL World Light Heavyweight Championship | |
| 21 | CMLL; NJPW | Fantastica Mania (Tokyo shows) | Tokyo, Japan | Volador Jr. (c) defeated Barbaro Cavernario for the NWA World Historic Welterweight Championship | |
| 22 | CMLL; NJPW | Fantastica Mania (Tokyo shows) | Tokyo, Japan | Los Guerreros Laguneros (Gran Guerrero and Último Guerrero) defeated Dragon Lee and Místico in a CMLL Brothers Tag Tournament Final Match | |
| 26 | AAA | Guerra de Titanes | Mexico City | El Hijo del Fantasma (c) defeated El Texano Jr. in a Steel cage match to retain the AAA Latin American Championship | The event was also notable for the surprise appearance of the formers CMLL stars Máximo and La Máscara following then the match between Psycho Clown and Rey Escorpión. |
| 27 | WWE: NXT | TakeOver: Philadelphia | Philadelphia, Pennsylvania | Andrade "Cien" Almas (c) defeated Johnny Gargano in a Singles match to retain the NXT Championship | First appearance of Ricochet and the return of EC3, who had last performed in WWE in 2013 under former ring name Derrick Bateman. |
| 27 | NJPW | The New Beginning in Sapporo | Sapporo, Japan | Minoru Suzuki defeated Hiroshi Tanahashi (c) in a Singles match to win the IWGP Intercontinental Championship | |
| 28 | NJPW | The New Beginning in Sapporo | Sapporo, Japan | Jay White defeated Kenny Omega (c) in a Singles match to win the IWGP United States Heavyweight Championship | |
| 28 | WWE: Raw; SmackDown | Royal Rumble | Philadelphia, Pennsylvania | Asuka won the 30-woman Royal Rumble match by last eliminating Nikki Bella to earn a women's championship match at WrestleMania 34 | This was the first event to feature a women's Royal Rumble match, which was the second women's match to main event a WWE PPV, and the first to main event one of WWE's "Big Four" PPVs. Asuka chose to challenge Charlotte Flair for the SmackDown Women's Championship at WrestleMania 34. The event was also notable for the surprise appearance of former UFC star Ronda Rousey following the women's match, officially confirming that she had signed a full-time deal with WWE. Shinsuke Nakamura won the men's Royal Rumble match and chose to challenge for the WWE Championship at WrestleMania 34. |
(c) – denotes defending champion(s)

=== February ===
| Date | Promotion(s) | Event | Location | Main Event | Notes |
|---|---|---|---|---|---|
| 9 | ROH | Honor Reigns Supreme | Concord, North Carolina | The Young Bucks (Matt Jackson & Nick Jackson) defeat Best Friends (Beretta & Chuckie T) | |
| 10 | NJPW | The New Beginning in Osaka | Osaka, Japan | Kazuchika Okada (c) defeated Sanada in a Singles match to retain the IWGP Heavyweight Championship | |
| 11 | IWRG | Cabellera vs. Cabellera | Naucalpan, State of Mexico, Mexico | Black Dragon defeated Oficial Spartan by disqualification | As a result of his loss, Oficial Spartan had his hair shaved off |
| 23 | ROH; NJPW | Honor Rising: Japan | Tokyo, Japan | Cody Rhodes, Hangman Page, Marty Scurll defeated Kenny Omega, Kota Ibushi, Chase Owens in a 6 Man Tag Team Match | |
| 24 | ROH; NJPW | Honor Rising: Japan | Tokyo, Japan | Golden☆Lovers (Kota Ibushi and Kenny Omega) defeated Bullet Club (Marty Scurll and Cody) in a Tag team match | |
| 25 | WWE: Raw | Elimination Chamber | Las Vegas, Nevada | Roman Reigns defeated Braun Strowman, Elias, Finn Bálor, John Cena, Seth Rollins, and The Miz in an Elimination Chamber match for a WWE Universal Championship match at WrestleMania 34 | First event to feature a women's Elimination Chamber match and the first ever seven-man Elimination Chamber; Last Raw-exclusive PPV of the second brand split, as following WrestleMania 34, all WWE PPVs ceased being brand exclusive. |
| 25 | IWRG | El Protector | Naucalpan, State of Mexico, Mexico | Rokambole Jr. and Villano V Jr. defeated Ram El Carnero and Trauma I | El Protector tournament finals |
| 25 | DDT | Into The Fight 2018 | Tokyo, Japan | Shuji Ishikawa and Daisuke Sekimoto defeated Konosuke Takeshita and Harashima | |
(c) – denotes defending champion(s)

=== March ===
| Date | Promotion(s) | Event | Location | Main Event | Notes |
|---|---|---|---|---|---|
| 3 | ROH | Manhattan Mayhem | New York City | BULLET CLUB (Hangman Page, Marty Scurll, Matt Jackson & Nick Jackson) defeat Shane Taylor & The Kingdom (Matt Taven, T. K. O'Ryan & Vinny Marseglia) | |
| 3 | Impact | One Night Only: March Breakdown | Belleville, Michigan | Kongo Kong and RJ City defeated Austin Aries and Alberto El Patron | Aired on March 16. |
| 4 | AAA | Rey de Reyes | Puebla, Mexico | El Hijo del Fantasma defeated El Texano Jr. in a Best two-out-of-three falls Lucha de Apuesta, mask vs. hair match. | |
| 6 | NJPW | 46th Anniversary Show | Tokyo, Japan | IWGP Heavyweight Champion Kazuchika Okada defeated IWGP Junior Heavyweight Champion Will Ospreay in a non-title Champion vs Champion match. | |
| 9–10 | ROH | 16th Anniversary Show | Sunrise Manor, Nevada | Dalton Castle (c) defeated Jay Lethal in a Singles match to retain the ROH World Championship | |
| 11 | WWE: SmackDown | Fastlane | Columbus, Ohio | AJ Styles (c) defeated Kevin Owens, Sami Zayn, Baron Corbin, Dolph Ziggler, and John Cena in a Six-Pack Challenge to retain the WWE Championship | Last SmackDown-exclusive PPV, and brand-exclusive PPV, of the second brand split, as following WrestleMania 34, all WWE PPVs ceased being brand exclusive. |
| 16 | CMLL | Homenaje a Dos Leyendas | Mexico City | El Cuatrero defeated Ángel de Oro Mask vs Mask match | |
| 18 | IWRG | Rebelión de los Juniors | Naucalpan, State of Mexico, Mexico | El Hijo del Alebrije defeated Apolo Estrada Jr., Capo del Norte, Diablo Jr., Dr. Karonte, El Hijo del Medico Asesino, El Hijo del Pantera, Hijo de Pirata Morgan, Lunatic Extreme, Mascara Magica Jr., and Hip Hop Man | |
| 21 | NJPW | New Japan Cup Final | Nagaoka, Japan | Zack Sabre Jr. defeated Hiroshi Tanahashi | |
| 24 | Impact | One Night Only: Cali Combat | Belleville, Michigan | Austin Aries (c) defeated Eli Drake for the Impact World Championship | Aired on May 11. |
| 25 | DDT | Judgement 2018: DDT 21st Anniversary | Tokyo, Japan | Konosuke Takeshita (c) defeated Shuji Ishikawa to retain the KO-D Openweight Championship | |
| 25 | NJPW | Strong Style Evolved | Long Beach, California | Golden☆Lovers (Kenny Omega and Kota Ibushi) defeated The Young Bucks in a Tag team match | |
| 25 | IWRG | Cabellera vs. Cabellera | Naucalpan, State of Mexico, Mexico | Ricky Marvin defeated Dr. Cerebro | As a result of his loss, Dr. Cerebro had all his hair shaved off |
(c) – denotes defending champion(s)

=== April ===
| Date | Promotion(s) | Event | Location | Main Event | Notes |
|---|---|---|---|---|---|
| 1 | NJPW | Sakura Genesis | Tokyo, Japan | Kazuchika Okada (c) defeated Zack Sabre Jr. in a Singles match to retain the IWGP Heavyweight Championship | |
| 6 | Impact; LU | Impact Wrestling vs. Lucha Underground | New Orleans, Louisiana | Pentagón Dark defeated Austin Aries and Fénix in a Three-way match | |
| 7 | ROH | Supercard of Honor XII | New Orleans, Louisiana | Dalton Castle (c) defeated Marty Scurll in a Singles match to retain the ROH World Championship | First Ring of Honor show to sell 6,000 fans in attendance |
| 7 | WWE: NXT | TakeOver: New Orleans | New Orleans, Louisiana | Johnny Gargano defeated Tommaso Ciampa by submission in an unsanctioned match Since Gargano won, he was reinstated to NXT. If Ciampa had won, Gargano would have been permanently banned from NXT. | First event to feature the NXT North American Championship |
| 7 | CMLL | 75. Aniversario de Arena Coliseo | Mexico City, Mexico | Atlantis and Blue Panther defeated Fuerza Guerrera and El Satánico | |
| 8 | WWE: Raw; SmackDown | WrestleMania 34 | New Orleans, Louisiana | Brock Lesnar (c) defeated Roman Reigns in a Singles match to retain the WWE Universal Championship | This was Daniel Bryan's in-ring return after 3 years, as he was forced to retire, but was cleared to compete again. This was also Ronda Rousey's in-ring debut. |
| 10 | NJPW | Lion's Gate Project 11 | Tokyo, Japan | Ayato Yoshida and Go Asakawa defeated Yuji Nagata and Shota Umino in a Tag team match | |
| 15 | ROH | Masters of the Craft | Columbus, Ohio | Marty Scurll defeated Dalton Castle, Beer City Bruiser and Punishment Martinez | |
| 15 | IWRG | Guerra del Golfo | Naucalpan, State of Mexico, Mexico | Tortuga Mike defeated Tortuga Teelo | Teelo lost a Steel Cage match and had to unmask |
| 22 | Impact | Redemption | Orlando, Florida | Pentagón Jr. defeated Austin Aries (c) and Rey Fenix in Triple threat match to win the Impact World Championship | |
| 27 | WWE: Raw; SmackDown; 205 Live | Greatest Royal Rumble | Jeddah, Saudi Arabia | Braun Strowman won by last eliminating Big Cass in a 50-man Royal Rumble match for the Greatest Royal Rumble Championship | First-ever 50-man Royal Rumble match last appearance of Chris Jericho |
| 27 | CMLL | 62. Aniversario de Arena México | Mexico City, Mexico | Atlantis, Místico and Volador Jr. defeated La Peste Negra (Bárbaro Cavernario and Negro Casas) and Último Guerrero | |
| 27 | ROH | Bound By Honor | West Palm Beach, Florida | The Briscoes (Jay Briscoe & Mark Briscoe) (c) defeated The Motor City Machine Guns (Alex Shelley & Chris Sabin) to retain the ROH World Tag Team Championship | |
| 28 | ROH | Bound By Honor | Lakeland, Florida | Bullet Club (Cody, Marty Scurll, Matt Jackson & Nick Jackson) defeated Dalton Castle, Silas Young & The Briscoes (Jay Briscoe & Mark Briscoe) | |
| 29 | NJPW | Wrestling Hinokuni | Kumamoto, Japan | Tetsuya Naito defeated Minoru Suzuki (c) in a Singles match to win the IWGP Intercontinental Championship | |
(c) – denotes defending champion(s)

=== May ===
| Date | Promotion(s) | Event | Location | Main Event | Notes |
|---|---|---|---|---|---|
| 3 | NJPW | Wrestling Dontaku | Fukuoka, Japan | Kenny Omega defeated Hangman Page in a Singles match | |
| 4 | NJPW | Wrestling Dontaku | Fukuoka, Japan | Kazuchika Okada (c) defeated Hiroshi Tanahashi in a Singles match to retain the IWGP Heavyweight Championship | |
| 6 | WWE: Raw; SmackDown | Backlash | Newark, New Jersey | Roman Reigns defeated Samoa Joe in a Singles match | |
| 9 | ROH; NJPW | War of the Worlds Tour | Lowell, Massachusetts | The Young Bucks (Matt Jackson and Nick Jackson) defeated Los Ingobernables de Japón (Bushi and Hiromu Takahashi) in a Tag team match | |
| 11 | ROH; NJPW | War of the Worlds Tour | Toronto, Ontario, Canada | Los Ingobernables de Japón (Bushi, Evil, Hiromu Takahashi and Sanada) defeated Dalton Castle, Jay Lethal, Kenny King and Colt Cabana in an Eight-man tag team match | |
| 12 | ROH; NJPW | War of the Worlds Tour | Royal Oak, Michigan | The Briscoes (Jay Briscoe and Mark Briscoe) (c) defeated Los Ingobernables de Japón (Tetsuya Naito and Tetsuya Bushi) in a Tag team match to retain the ROH World Tag Team Championship | |
| 13 | ROH; NJPW | War of the Worlds Tour | Chicago, Illinois | Bullet Club (Cody, Hangman Page, Marty Scurll, and The Young Bucks (Matt Jackson and Nick Jackson)) defeated Los Ingobernables de Japón (Bushi, Evil, Hiromu Takahashi, Sanada, and Tetsuya Naito) in a Ten-man tag team match | |
| 15 | NJPW | Lion's Gate Project 12 | Tokyo, Japan | Yuji Nagata defeated Ayato Yoshida in a Singles match | |
| 20 | IWRG | Rey del Ring | Naucalpan, State of Mexico, Mexico | Emperador Azteca won the 30-man Rey del Ring match | |
| 24 | ROH | Honor United | Edinburgh, Scotland | The Briscoes (Jay Briscoe & Mark Briscoe) (c) defeat BULLET CLUB (Cody & Hangman Page) to retain the ROH World Tag Team Championship | |
| 26 | ROH | Honor United | London, England | The Kingdom (Matt Taven, T. K. O'Ryan & Vinny Marseglia) (c) defeat BULLET CLUB (Hangman Page, Matt Jackson & Nick Jackson) and SoCal Uncensored (Christopher Daniels, Frankie Kazarian & Scorpio Sky) to retain the ROH World Six Man Tag Team Championship | |
| 27 | ROH | Honor United | Doncaster, England | The Young Bucks (Matt Jackson & Nick Jackson) defeat Los Ingobernables de Japón (Evil & Sanada) and The Briscoes (Jay Briscoe & Mark Briscoe) and The Kingdom (T. K. O'Ryan & Vinny Marseglia) | |
(c) – denotes defending champion(s)

=== June ===
| Date | Promotion(s) | Event | Location | Main Event | Notes |
|---|---|---|---|---|---|
| 3 | AAA | Verano de Escándalo | Monterrey, Nuevo León | Jeff Jarrett defeated Rey Wagner (c) and Rey Mysterio Jr. in a three-way match to win the AAA Mega Championship | The event was also notable for the surprises returns of Lady Maravilla, Keira, Xtreme Tiger, Laredo Kid, Brian Cage, Jeff Jarrett, Konnan and Fénix in AAA. |
| 3 | Impact | One Night Only: Zero Fear | Mississauga, Ontario, Canada | Pentagon, Jr. defeated Eli Drake and Moose in a Triple Threat match | Aired on June 15. |
| 3 | IWRG | Cabellera vs. Cabellera | Naucalpan, State of Mexico, Mexico | Black Dragon defeated Lunatik Xtreme | Lunatik Xtreme had all his hair shaved off as a result of his loss. |
| 9 | NJPW | Dominion 6.9 in Osaka-jo Hall | Osaka, Japan | Kenny Omega defeated Kazuchika Okada (c) 2–1 in No time limit two out of three falls match to win the IWGP Heavyweight Championship | Chris Jericho defeated Tetsuya Naito to win IWGP Intercontinental Championship, with the win, Jericho became the first person to hold Intercontinental Championships in both WWE and NJPW. Okada's fourth reign at 720 days is the longest in the championship's history, and it also holds the record for most successful title defences; which is 12. |
| 13 | NJPW | Lion's Gate Project X3 | Tokyo, Japan | Ayato Yoshida defeated Shota Umino in a Singles match | |
| 15 | ROH | State Of The Art | San Antonio, Texas | Bullet Club (Hangman Page, Marty Scurll, Matt Jackson & Nick Jackson) defeat The Killer Elite Squad (Davey Boy Smith Jr. & Lance Archer) & The Kingdom (Matt Taven & Vinny Marseglia) | |
| 16 | ROH | State Of The Art | Dallas, Texas | Punishment Martinez defeated Silas Young (c) to win the ROH World Television Championship | |
| 16 | WWE: NXT | TakeOver: Chicago II | Rosemont, Illinois | Tommaso Ciampa defeated Johnny Gargano in a Chicago Street Fight | |
| 17 | WWE: Raw; SmackDown | Money in the Bank | Rosemont, Illinois | Braun Strowman defeated Bobby Roode, Finn Bálor, Kevin Owens, Kofi Kingston, Rusev, Samoa Joe, and The Miz to win the men's Money in the Bank ladder match for a world championship match contract | Alexa Bliss won the women's Money in the Bank ladder match and then cashed in the contract that same night to win the Raw Women's Championship. |
| 17 | IWRG | Festival de las Máscaras | Naucalpan, State of Mexico, Mexico | El Hijo de L.A. Park and L.A. Park defeated Dragon Lee and Rush | |
| 18 | WWE: NXT; UK | United Kingdom Championship Tournament | Kensington, London, England | Zack Gibson defeated Travis Banks by submission in the Tournament final to determine the #1 contender to the WWE United Kingdom Championship | |
| 19 | WWE: NXT; UK | United Kingdom Championship Tournament | Kensington, London, England | Pete Dunne (c) defeated Zack Gibson in a Singles match to retain the WWE United Kingdom Championship | |
| 29 | ROH | Best in the World | Baltimore, Maryland | Dalton Castle (c) defeated Cody and Marty Scurll in a Three-way match to retain the ROH World Championship | |
| 29 | NJPW | When Worlds Collide | Daytona Beach, Florida | The Golden Lovers (Kenny Omega & Kota Ibushi) defeated Los Ingobernables de Japón (Tetsuya Naito & Hiromu Takahashi) | |
| 30 | NJPW / RevPro | Strong Style Evolved UK | Milton Keynes, England | Suzuki-gun (Minoru Suzuki and Zack Sabre Jr.) (c) defeated Chaos (Kazuchika Okada and Tomohiro Ishii) in a Tag team match for the Undisputed British Tag Team Championship | |
(c) – denotes defending champion(s)

=== July ===
| Date | Promotion(s) | Event | Location | Main Event | Notes |
|---|---|---|---|---|---|
| 1 | NJPW / RevPro | Strong Style Evolved UK | Greater Manchester, England | Minoru Suzuki defeated Tomohiro Ishii (c) in a Singles match for the British Heavyweight Championship | |
| 7 | NJPW | G1 Special in San Francisco | Daly City, California | Kenny Omega (c) defeated Cody in a Singles match to retain the IWGP Heavyweight Championship | |
| 13 | CMLL | Atlantis 35th Anniversary Show | Mexico City, Mexico | Los Ingobernables (Rush and El Terrible) defeated Sky Team (Valiente and Volador Jr.) (c) for the CMLL World Tag Team Championship | |
| 15 | WWE: Raw; SmackDown | Extreme Rules | Pittsburgh, Pennsylvania | Dolph Ziggler (c) defeated Seth Rollins 5–4 in sudden death overtime in a 30-minute Iron Man match to retain the WWE Intercontinental Championship | This was the first time the Intercontinental Championship main evented a WWE pay-per-view since Backlash in 2001. |
| 15 | IWRG | Cabellera vs. Cabellera | Naucalpan, State of Mexico, Mexico | Obett defeated X-Fly | Obett was shaved bald as a result of his loss |
| 14 | WWC | WWC Anniversary 45 | Guaynabo, Puerto Rico | Jack Swagger defeated Carlito Caribbean Cool | |
| 21 | AAA / Elite | AAA vs. Elite | Mexico City, Mexico | Team ELITE (Electroshock, L.A. Park and Puma King) defeated Team AAA (Psycho Clown, El Hijo del Fantasma and Rey Wagner) in a 6 Man Tag Team Match | |
| 19 | MLW | Battle Riot | Queens, New York | Tom Lawlor won by last eliminating Jake Hager in a 40-man Battle Riot match for a future MLW World Heavyweight Championship match | |
| 20 | ROH | Honor for All | Nashville, Tennessee | The Young Bucks (Matt Jackson & Nick Jackson) defeated The Addiction (Christopher Daniels & Frankie Kazarian) and The Briscoes (Jay Briscoe & Mark Briscoe) | |
| 22 | Impact | Slammiversary | Toronto, Ontario, Canada | Austin Aries (c) defeated Moose in a singles match to retain the Impact World Championship | |
| 22 | IWRG | Zona de Ejecucion | Naucalpan, State of Mexico, Mexico | Las Traumas (Trauma I and Trauma II), El Hijo del Medico Asesino and Eterno defeated Los Tortugas Ninjas (Leo, Mike and Rafy) and Relampago and El Hijo del Alebrije, Emperador Azteca, Freelance and Imposible and Dr. Cerebro, El Hijo de Canis Lupus, El Pantera II and Veneno | |
(c) – denotes defending champion(s)

=== August ===
| Date | Promotion(s) | Event | Location | Main Event | Notes |
|---|---|---|---|---|---|
| 3 | CMLL | Negro Casas 40th Anniversary Show | Mexico City, Mexico | Los Lucha Bros (King Phoenix and Penta el 0M) and L.A. Park defeated Rush and The Briscoe Brothers (Jay Briscoe and Mark Briscoe) | |
| 8 | IWRG | Ejecucion Total | Naucalpan, State of Mexico, Mexico | Imposible, Relampago and X-Fly defeated Los Tortugas Ninjas (Leo, Mike and Rafy) and Capo del Norte, Capo del Sur and Pit Bull and Aramís, El Hijo de Canis Lupus and Pasion Crystal | Four-way trios elimination match |
| 12 | NJPW | G1 Climax 28 | Tokyo, Japan | Hiroshi Tanahashi defeated Kota Ibushi to win the 2018 G1 Climax Tournament | |
| 16 | ROH | Honor Re United | Edinburgh, Scotland | Bullet Club (Marty Scurll, Matt Jackson & Nick Jackson) defeat Punishment Martinez & The Briscoes (Jay Briscoe & Mark Briscoe) | |
| 18 | ROH | Honor Re United | Doncaster, England | Jay Lethal (c) defeats Mark Haskins to retain the ROH World Championship | |
| 19 | ROH | Honor Re United | London, England | Mark Haskins defeats Hangman Page to win the International Cup | |
| 18 | WWE: NXT | TakeOver: Brooklyn IV | Brooklyn, New York | Tommaso Ciampa (c) defeated Johnny Gargano in a Last Man Standing match to retain the NXT Championship | |
| 19 | WWE: Raw; SmackDown; 205 Live | SummerSlam | Brooklyn, New York | Roman Reigns defeated Brock Lesnar (c) in a Singles match to win the WWE Universal Championship | Lesnar's first reign at 504 days is the longest in the championship's history. |
| 25 | AAA | Triplemanía XXVI | Mexico City | L.A. Park defeated El Hijo del Fantasma, Psycho Clown and Pentagón Jr. in Póker de Ases, Lucha de Apuestas, mask vs. mask cage match. | |
| 25 | Impact | One Night Only: Bad Intentions | Mississauga, Ontario, Canada | Josh Alexander defeated Sami Callihan in a Steel Cage match | Aired on August 31. |
| 25 | Impact | One Night Only: Night of the Dummies | Binghamton, New York | Eddie Edwards defeated Eli Drake | Aired on September 14. |
(c) – denotes defending champion(s)

=== September ===
| Date | Promotion(s) | Event | Location | Main Event | Notes |
|---|---|---|---|---|---|
| 1 | N/A | All In | Hoffman Estates, Illinois | The Golden Elite (Matt Jackson, Nick Jackson, and Kota Ibushi) defeated Rey Mysterio, Rey Fénix, and Bandido | The first non-WWE or World Championship Wrestling promoted professional wrestling event in the United States to sell 10,000 tickets since 1993. |
| 9 | IWRG | Caravana de Campeones | Naucalpan, State of Mexico, Mexico | Mr. Electro (c) defeated El Hijo del Médico Asesino to defend the IWRG Intercontinental Heavyweight Championship | Special show featuring five championship matches |
| 14 | CMLL | CMLL 85th Anniversary Show | Mexico City | Rush and Bárbaro Cavernario defeated Matt Taven and Volador Jr in the Best two-out-of-three falls tag team Lucha de Apuestas, hair vs. hair match | |
| 14–16 | PWG | Battle of Los Angeles | Reseda, California | Jeff Cobb defeated Bandido and Shingo Takagi in an elimination three-way match to win the 2018 Battle of Los Angeles tournament | |
| 15 | NJPW | Destruction in Hiroshima | Hiroshima, Japan | Kenny Omega (c) defeated Tomohiro Ishii in a Singles match to retain the IWGP Heavyweight Championship | |
| 16 | WWE: Raw; SmackDown | Hell in a Cell | San Antonio, Texas | Roman Reigns (c) versus Braun Strowman in a Hell in a Cell match for the WWE Universal Championship with special guest referee Mick Foley ended in a no-contest due to interference from Brock Lesnar. This was Strowman's Money in the Bank cash-in match. | |
| 17 | NJPW | Destruction in Beppu | Beppu, Japan | Tetsuya Naito defeated Minoru Suzuki in a Singles match | |
| 23 | NJPW | Destruction in Kobe | Kobe, Japan | Hiroshi Tanahashi defeated Kazuchika Okada in a Singles match for the Tokyo Dome IWGP Heavyweight Championship challenge rights certificate | |
| 28 | ROH | Death Before Dishonor XVI | Las Vegas, Nevada | Jay Lethal (c) defeated Will Ospreay in a Singles match to retain the ROH World Championship | |
| 30 | NJPW | Fighting Spirit Unleashed | Long Beach, California | Golden☆Lovers (Kenny Omega and Kota Ibushi) defeated Chaos (Kazuchika Okada and Tomohiro Ishii) | |
(c) – denotes defending champion(s)

=== October ===
| Date | Promotion(s) | Event | Location | Main Event | Notes |
|---|---|---|---|---|---|
| 5 | CMLL | CMLL International Gran Prix | Mexico City | Michael Elgin won the 2018 Gran Prix; Teams: Resto del Mundo (Matt Taven, Jay Briscoe, Mark Briscoe, Dark Magic, Michael Elgin, David Finlay, Gilbert el Boricua, Flip Gordon and Okumura) defeated Team Mexico (Diamante Azul, Carístico, El Cuatrero, Euforia, Hechicero, Sansón, El Terrible, Último Guerrero, and Volador Jr.) | |
| 6 | WWE: Raw; SmackDown; 205 Live | Super Show-Down | Melbourne, Victoria, Australia | Triple H defeated The Undertaker in No Disqualification match | |
| 6 | Impact | One Night Only: BCW 25th Anniversary | Windsor, Ontario, Canada | Cody Deaner defeated Johnny Impact, Kongo Kong (c), and Matt Sydal in a Four-way match for the BCW Can-Am Heavyweight Championship | Aired on November 16. |
| 7 | IWRG | Relevos Increibles de Máscaras y Cabelleras | Naucalpan, State of Mexico, Mexico | Demonio Infernal defeated Freelance | Freelance had his hair shaved off as a result |
| 8 | NJPW | King of Pro-Wrestling | Tokyo, Japan | Kenny Omega (c) defeated Cody and Kota Ibushi in a Three-way match to retain the IWGP Heavyweight Championship | |
| 12 | ROH | Glory By Honor XVI | Baltimore, Maryland | Jay Lethal (c) defeated Silas Young to retain the ROH World Championship | |
| 14 | NJPW; RevPro | Global Wars UK | London, England | Tomohiro Ishii defeated Minoru Suzuki (c) to win the British Heavyweight Championship | |
| 14 | Impact | Bound for Glory | New York City, New York | Johnny Impact defeated Austin Aries (c) to win the Impact World Championship | |
| 19 | CMLL | Blue Panther 40th Anniversary Show | Mexico City, Mexico | Bárbaro Cavernario and Los Ingobernables (Rush and El Terrible) defeated Carístico, Penta el 0M, and David Finlay | |
| 21 | DDT | Ryōgoku Peter Pan 2018 | Tokyo, Japan | Daisuke Sasaki defeated Danshoku Dino (c) by submission to win the KO-D Openweight Championship | |
| 21 | NWA | NWA 70th Anniversary Show | Nashville, Tennessee | Nick Aldis defeated Cody (c) in a 2-out-of-3 falls match to win the NWA World Heavyweight Championship | |
| 28 | AAA | Héroes Inmortales XII | Puebla, Puebla | Rey Wagner defeated Jeff Jarrett in a hair vs. hair match | |
| 28 | WWE: Raw; SmackDown; NXT | Evolution | Uniondale, New York | Ronda Rousey (c) defeated Nikki Bella by submission to retain the WWE Raw Women's Championship | First-ever WWE PPV featuring only female wrestlers; the PPV also featured the final of the Mae Young Classic tournament. The event also marked the first main roster Last Woman Standing match featuring Becky Lynch and Charlotte Flair. |
| 27–31 | ROH | Chris Jericho's Rock 'N' Wrestling Rager at Sea | Miami, Florida to Nassau, Bahamas | Bullet Club (Kenny Omega, Cody & Marty Scurll) defeated Alpha Club (Chris Jericho & The Young Bucks) | |
(c) – denotes defending champion(s)

=== November ===
| Date | Promotion(s) | Event | Location | Main Event | Notes |
|---|---|---|---|---|---|
| 1 | IWRG | El Castillo del Terror | Naucalpan, State of Mexico, Mexico | Tortuga Mike defeated Oficial Spector to unmask him | 12-person Steel cage match that also included Aramis, Diosa Atenea, Dragón Bane, El Hijo del Alebrije, El Hijo de Canis Lupus, Relámpago, Ludark Shaitan, Shil-Kah, Tortuga Leo and Zumbi |
| 2 | WWE: Raw; SmackDown | Crown Jewel | Riyadh, Saudi Arabia | D-Generation X (Triple H and Shawn Michaels) defeated The Brothers of Destruction (The Undertaker and Kane) | This was Shawn Michaels' first match since retiring in 2010, as well as Hulk Hogan's return to WWE following a three-year suspension due to a 2015 scandal; Hogan served as the host of the event |
| 2 | CMLL | CMLL Día de Muertos | Mexico City, Mexico | Diamante Azul, L.A. Park, and Michael Elgin defeated King Phoenix, Penta 0M, and Último Guerrero in a six-man Relevos increíbles match | |
| 3 | NJPW | Power Struggle | Osaka, Japan | Chris Jericho (c) defeated Evil by submission to retain the IWGP Intercontinental Championship | |
| 3 | The Crash | The Crash VII Aniversario | Tijuana, Baja California, Mexico | Bestia 666 defeated Garza Jr., hair vs. hair match | |
| 4 | ROH | Survival of the Fittest | Columbus, Ohio | Marty Scurll defeated Christopher Daniels, Hangman Page, P. J. Black, Jonathan Gresham and Guerrero Maya Jr. to win 2018 Survival of the Fittest | |
| 7 | ROH; NJPW | Global Wars | Lewiston, Maine | Los Ingobernables de Japón (Tetsuya Naito, Evil, Sanada and Bushi) defeated Jay Lethal, Jonathan Gresham, Chris Sabin and Kushida | |
| 8 | ROH; NJPW | Global Wars | Lowell, Massachusetts | Jay Lethal and Jonathan Gresham defeated Chris Sabin and Kushida, The Young Bucks (Matt Jackson and Nick Jackson) and The Kingdom (T. K. O'Ryan and Vinny Marseglia) | |
| 9 | ROH; NJPW | Global Wars | Buffalo, New York | Best Friends (Beretta and Chuckie T.) defeated The Briscoes (Jay Briscoe and Mark Briscoe) and The Elite (Cody and Hangman Page) | |
| 11 | ROH; NJPW | Global Wars | Toronto, Ontario | Jay Lethal (c) defeated Kenny King to retain the ROH World Championship | |
| 10–11 | NJPW | Lion's Break Project 1 | Anaheim, California | Kenny Omega defeated David Finlay (Night 2) | |
| 15 | IWRG | Triangular en Jaula | Naucalpan, State of Mexico | Rush defeated L.A. Park and Penta 0M | |
| 17 | WWE: NXT | TakeOver: WarGames | Los Angeles, California | Pete Dunne, Ricochet, and War Raiders (Hanson and Rowe) defeated The Undisputed Era (Adam Cole, Bobby Fish, Kyle O'Reilly, and Roderick Strong) in the WarGames match | |
| 18 | WWE: Raw; SmackDown; 205 Live | Survivor Series | Los Angeles, California | Raw's Universal Champion Brock Lesnar defeated SmackDown's WWE Champion Daniel Bryan in a non-title Champion vs Champion match. | |
| 25 | WWE: Raw; SmackDown | Starrcade | Cincinnati, Ohio | Seth Rollins (c) defeated Dean Ambrose in a Steel Cage match for the WWE Intercontinental Championship | |
| 30 | CMLL | Leyendas Mexicanas | Mexico City, Mexico | Atlantis, Blue Panther and El Rayo de Jalisco Jr. defeated Canek, Mascara Ano 2000 and Villano IV | |
(c) – denotes defending champion(s)

=== December ===
| Date | Promotion(s) | Event | Location | Main Event | Notes |
|---|---|---|---|---|---|
| 1 | Impact | One Night Only: Back to Cali | Salinas, California | Johnny Impact (c) defeated Moose for the Impact World Championship | Aired on December 21. |
| 2 | AAA | Guerra de Titanes | Aguascalientes, Aguascalientes | Blue Demon Jr. and Killer Kross defeated Psycho Clown and Rey Wagner in tag team match. | |
| 4 | WWE: Raw; SmackDown | Tribute to the Troops | Killeen, Texas | AJ Styles and Seth Rollins defeated Daniel Bryan and Dean Ambrose in a tag team match | Aired on December 20 on the USA Network. |
| 9 | NJPW | World Tag League | Iwate, Japan | Evil and Sanada defeated Tama Tonga and Tanga Loa to win the 2018 World Tag League | |
| 14 | ROH | Final Battle | New York City | The Briscoes (Jay Briscoe and Mark Briscoe) defeated SoCal Uncensored (Frankie Kazarian and Scorpio Sky) (c) and The Young Bucks (Matt Jackson and Nick Jackson) to win the ROH World Tag Team Championship in a Ladder war | |
| 16 | WWE: Raw; SmackDown; 205 Live | TLC: Tables, Ladders & Chairs | San Jose, California | Asuka defeated Becky Lynch (c) and Charlotte Flair in a Triple Threat Tables, Ladders, and Chairs match to win the WWE SmackDown Women's Championship | This was the first-ever women's TLC match, which was also the first time the title was contested in the main event match of a pay-per-view. |
(c) – denotes defending champion(s)

== Accomplishments and tournaments ==
=== All Japan Pro-Wrestling (AJPW) ===
| Dates | | Tournament | Final |
| Start | Final | Tournament | Final |
|---|---|---|---|
| February 13 | February 25 | Jr. Battle of Glory | Shuji Kondo defeated Koji Iwamoto to win the 2018 Jr. Battle of Glory |
| April 7 | April 30 | Champion Carnival | Naomichi Marufuji defeated Kento Miyahara to win the 2018 Champion Carnival. |
| August 3 | August 25 | AJPW Junior Tag League | Iwamoto and Tajiri defeated Aoki and Sato to win the 2018 AJPW Junior Tag League. |
| September 15 | September 24 | Ōdō Tournament | Kento Miyahara defeated Kengo Mashimo to win the 2018 Ōdō Tournament. |

=== Consejo Mundial de Lucha Libre (CMLL) ===
| Dates | | Tournament | Final |
| Start | Final | Tournament | Final |
|---|---|---|---|
| February 10 | February 24 | Torneo Nacional de Parejas Increíbles | El Terrible and Rush defeated Último Guerrero and Volador Jr. in a Parejas Increibles tag team match |
| February 24 | March 11 | CMLL Arena Coliseo Tag Team Championship tournament | Esfinge and Tritón defeated Disturbio and Virus to win the vacant championship |
| March 2 | March 16 | CMLL World Tag Team Championship tournament | Valiente and Volador Jr. defeated El Terrible and Rey Bucanero |
| April 3 | April 17 | Copa Nuevos Valores | Magia Blanca defeated Volador Jr. |
| May 4 | May 18 | Torneo Gran Alternatia | Flyer and Volador Jr. defeated Templario and Último Guerrero |
| October 5 | – | CMLL International Gran Prix | Michael Elgin defeated Último Guerrero |
| October 9 | October 16 | CMLL World Heavyweight Championship tournament | Último Guerrero defeated Diamante Azul |
| October 26 | November 2 | Rey del Inframundo | Sansón defeated Templario |

=== International Wrestling Revolution Group (IWRG) ===
| Date | Tournament | Final |
|---|---|---|
| January 31, 2018 | 67. Torneo FILL | Alas de Acero, Angel Oriental, Aramis, Demonio Infernal, Diablo Jr. I, Lunatic Xtreme, Odin and Shadow Boy defeated Adamantium, Balak, Energia, La Mosca, Mascara Magica Jr., Motocross, Orion, Principe Negro and Rey Lagarto by disqualification |
| February 25, 2018 | El Protector | Rokambole Jr. and Villano V Jr. defeated Ram El Carnero and Trauma I |
| March 18, 2018 | Rebelión de los Juniors | El Hijo del Alebrije defeated Apolo Estrada Jr., Capo del Norte, El Diablo Jr., Dr. Karonte, El Hijo del Medico Asesino, El Hijo del Pantera, El Hijo de Pirata Morgan, Lunatic Extreme, Mascara Magica Jr. and Hip Hop Man |
| May 20, 2018 | Rey del Ring | Emperador Azteca won a 30-man elimination match |
| June 26, 2018 | 71. Torneo FILL | El Hijo de Zumbido, Eligor, Flayman, Gallo Colorado, Meza Kid, Pandemonium Jr., Quetzal and Shalom defeated Atomic Star, Black Dragon, El Hijo de X-Fly, Guerrero 2000, Kanon, Lunatik Extreme, Mexica and Shadow Boy |
| July 25, 2018 | 72. Torneo FILL | Atomic Star, Black Dragon, Black Puma, Celestial Boy, Guerrero 2000, Kanon, Mexica and Shadow Boy defeated El Hijo de X-Fly, Eligor, Flayman, Gallo Colorado, Neza Kid, Quetzal, Shalom and Pandemonium Jr. |
| August 19, 2018 | 73. Torneo FILL | Gym Zeuz (Angel Estrella Jr., Death Metal, Guero Palma, Marduk and Taurino) and Gym Zaetas Del Ring (Eligor, Flamante, Neza King, Pandemonium Jr. and& Quetzal) and Gym Arena 23 (Baggera, John Tito, Payaxuco, Stone Magic & Ultimo Conde) defeated Gym FILL (Atomic Star, Black Dragon, Kanon, Mexica and Shadow Boy) |
| September 30, 2018 | 74. torneo FILL | Black Puma, Chef Benito, Chicanito, Fire Man, Guerrero 2000, Lunatik Extreme, Puma de Oro and Shadow Boy defeated 19 Y Miedo, Alas de Acero, Apolo, Chris Stone Jr;, Dragon Negro, Iron Kid, Manchitas and Psique |

=== Lucha Libre AAA Worldwide (AAA) ===
| Accomplishment | Winner | Date won | Notes |
|---|---|---|---|
| Rey de Reyes | Rey Escorpión | March 4 | Defeated Bengala, Hijo del Vikingo and La Parka in the Rey de Reyes final Fatal-4-Way. |
| Copa Antonio Peña | Pagano | October 28 | Last eliminated El Hijo del Fantasma to win. |
| Lucha Capital 1 (Men) | Laredo Kid | December 19 | Last eliminated Killer Kross to win. |
| Lucha Capital 1 (Women) | Taya Valkyrie | December 12 | Defeated Keira and Vanilla Vargas to win. |

=== National Wrestling Alliance (NWA) ===
| Accomplishment | Winner | Date won | Notes |
|---|---|---|---|
| NWA National Heavyweight Championship tournament | Willie Mack | October 21 | Defeated Sam Shaw in the final to win the vacant title. |

=== New Japan Pro-Wrestling (NJPW) ===
| Dates | | Tournament | Final |
| Start | Final | Tournament | Final |
|---|---|---|---|
| March 9 | March 21 | New Japan Cup | Zack Sabre Jr. defeated Hiroshi Tanahashi to win the 2018 New Japan Cup |
| May 18 | June 4 | Best of the Super Juniors 25 | Hiromu Takahashi defeated Taiji Ishimori to win the 2018 Best of the Super Juniors Tournament |
| July 14 | August 12 | G1 Climax 28 | Hiroshi Tanahashi defeated Kota Ibushi to win 2018 G1 Climax Tournament |
| October 16 | November 3 | Super Jr. Tag League | Roppongi 3K defeated Yoshinobu Kanemaru & El Desperado and Bushi & Shingo Takagi in a 3-way tag team match to win 2018 Super Jr. Tag League |
| November 17 | December 9 | World Tag League | Evil and Sanada defeated Tama Tonga and Tanga Loa to win 2018 World Tag League |

=== Pro Wrestling Noah ===
| Dates | | Tournament | Final |
| Start | Final | Tournament | Final |
|---|---|---|---|
| March 18 | April 11 | Global Tag League | Go Shiozaki and Kaito Kiyomiya defeated Kenoh and Takashi Sugiura to win the 2018 Global Tag League. |
| July 7 | August 5 | Global Junior Heavyweight Tag League | Ratel's (Hayata and Yo-Hey) defeated Hajime Ohara and Hitoshi Kumano to win the 2018 Global Junior Heavyweight Tag League. |
| September 8 | October 4 | Global Junior Heavyweight League | Kotaro Suzuki defeated Yo-Hey to win the 2018 Global Junior Heavyweight League. |

=== Pro Wrestling Zero1 ===
| Dates | | Tournament | Final |
| Start | Final | Tournament | Final |
|---|---|---|---|
| July 8 | July 29 | Fire Festival | Yuko Miyamoto defeated Kohei Sato to win the 2018 Fire Festival. |
| December 9 | December 22 | Furinkazan | Kohei Sato and Sugi defeated Shogun Okamoto and Chris Vice to win the 2018 Furinkazan. |
| September 8 | October 4 | Tenka-Ichi Junior | Sugi defeated Asuka to win the 2018 Tenka-Ichi Junior. |

=== WWE ===
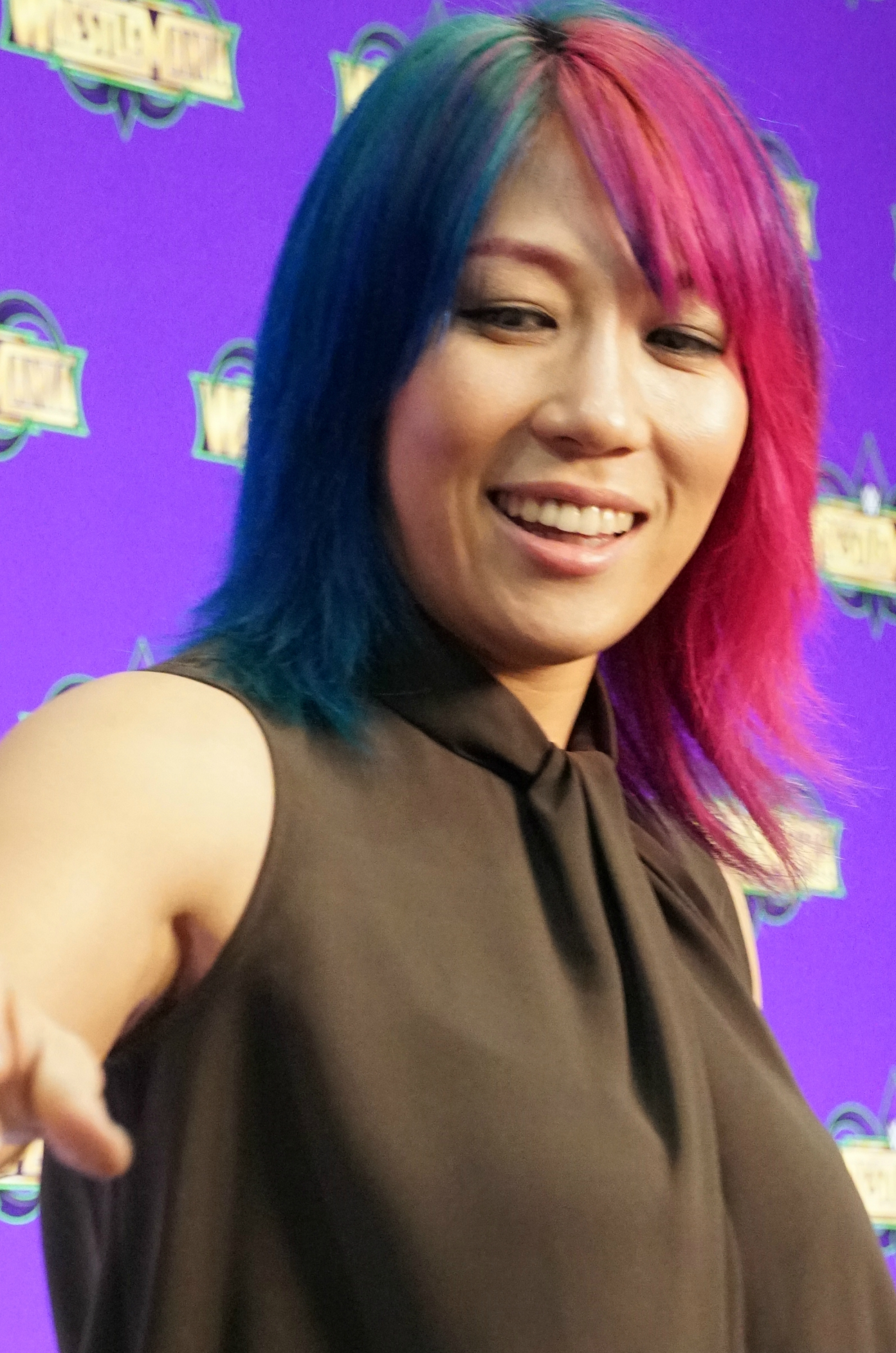
The inaugural Women's Royal Rumble winner, Asuka

| Accomplishment | Winner | Date won | Notes |
|---|---|---|---|
| United States Championship tournament | Bobby Roode | January 16 | Defeated Jinder Mahal in the tournament final to win the vacant United States Championship; the title was declared vacant after unsuccessful attempts at contacting previous champion Dolph Ziggler, who had abandoned the title belt in the ring on the December 17, 2017 episode of SmackDown Live. |
| Royal Rumble (Men) | Shinsuke Nakamura | January 28 | Winner received their choice of a championship match for either Raw's Universal Championship or SmackDown's WWE Championship at WrestleMania 34; Nakamura last eliminated Roman Reigns and chose his own brand's WWE Championship, but was unsuccessful against AJ Styles at the event. |
| Royal Rumble (Women) | Asuka | January 28 | Winner received their choice of a championship match for either the Raw Women's Championship or SmackDown Women's Championship at WrestleMania 34; Asuka from Raw last eliminated Nikki Bella to win the inaugural match and chose to challenge for the SmackDown Women's Championship, but was unsuccessful against Charlotte Flair at the event. |
| Mixed Match Challenge 1 | The Miz and Asuka | April 3 | Defeated Bobby Roode and Charlotte Flair in the tournament final to win. |
| Dusty Rhodes Tag Team Classic | The Undisputed Era (Adam Cole and Kyle O'Reilly) | April 7 | Defeated The Authors of Pain (Akam and Rezar) and Pete Dunne & Roderick Strong in the tournament final, which was a Winner Takes All match, in which The Undisputed Era retained the NXT Tag Team Championship and won the Dusty Rhodes Tag Team Classic Trophy. |
| WWE United Kingdom Championship Invitational | Lio Rush | April 7 | Winner faced Pete Dunne for the WWE United Kingdom Championship on April 8. Rush was unsuccessful in winning the title. |
| NXT North American Championship Invitational | Akira Tozawa | April 7 | Winner faced the NXT North American Champion on April 8. Tozawa was unsuccessful in winning the title. |
| NXT Tag Team Championship Invitational | Moustache Mountain (Trent Seven and Tyler Bate) | April 7 | Winner faced the NXT Tag Team Champions on April 8. Moustache Mountain were unsuccessful in winning the title. |
| NXT Women's Championship Invitational | Dakota Kai | April 7 | Winner faced the NXT Women's Champion on April 8. Kai was unsuccessful in winning the title. |
| Cruiserweight Championship tournament | Cedric Alexander | April 8 | Defeated Mustafa Ali in the tournament final to win the vacant WWE Cruiserweight Championship; previous champion Enzo Amore was released from the company following allegations of sexual assault, thus the title was vacated. |
| WrestleMania Women's Battle Royal | Naomi | April 8 | Last eliminated Bayley to win the WrestleMania Women's Battle Royal Trophy. |
| André the Giant Memorial Battle Royal | Matt Hardy | April 8 | Last eliminated Baron Corbin to win the André the Giant Memorial Trophy. |
| Greatest Royal Rumble | Braun Strowman | April 27 | Last eliminated Big Cass to win the Greatest Royal Rumble Match and Championship. |
| Money in the Bank ladder match (Women) | Alexa Bliss | June 17 | Defeated Becky Lynch, Charlotte Flair, Natalya, Ember Moon, Lana, Naomi, and Sasha Banks to win a title match contract for her brand's women's championship. Later that night, Bliss cashed in her contract on Nia Jax to win the Raw Women's Championship. |
| Money in the Bank ladder match (Men) | Braun Strowman | June 17 | Defeated Bobby Roode, Finn Bálor, Kevin Owens, Kofi Kingston, Rusev, Samoa Joe, and The Miz to win a title match contract for his brand's world championship. Cashed in on Universal Champion Roman Reigns at Hell in a Cell, but was unsuccessful as the match ended in a no contest. |
| United Kingdom Championship Tournament | Zack Gibson | June 18 | Winner faced Pete Dunne for the WWE United Kingdom Championship on June 19. Gibson was unsuccessful in winning the title. |
| Women's Battle Royal | Nia Jax | October 28 | Last eliminated Ember Moon to earn a match for her brand's women's championship. Faced Ronda Rousey for the Raw Women's Championship at TLC: Tables, Ladders & Chairs, but was unsuccessful. |
| Mae Young Classic | Toni Storm | October 28 | Defeated Io Shirai in the tournament final to win the Mae Young Classic Trophy, which aired as part of Evolution. |
| WWE World Cup | Shane McMahon | November 2 | Tournament to determine the "best in the world" in WWE. The final match was originally between SmackDown's The Miz and Raw's Dolph Ziggler, but Shane McMahon, who despite not being in the tournament, replaced Miz after Miz was deemed unable to compete due to a pre-match brawl. Shane then defeated Ziggler to win the WWE World Cup Trophy. |
| WarGames match | Pete Dunne, Ricochet, and War Raiders (Hanson and Ray Rowe) | November 17 | Defeated The Undisputed Era (Adam Cole, Bobby Fish, Kyle O'Reilly, and Roderick Strong) |
| Mixed Match Challenge 2 | R-Truth and Carmella | December 16 | Winners received the #30 spot of their respective men's and women's Royal Rumble matches at the 2019 Royal Rumble. |

== Title changes ==
=== CMLL ===
CMLL World Heavyweight Championship
Incoming champion – Marco Corleone
| Date | Winner | Event/Show | Note(s) |
| August 22 | Vacated | | |
| October 16 | Último Guerrero | Martes de Nuevos Valores | |

CMLL World Middleweight Championship
Incoming champion – Ángel de Oro
| Date | Winner | Event/Show | Note(s) |
| January 19 | El Cuatrero | Fantastica Mania | |

CMLL World Tag Team Championship
Incoming champions – Negro Casas and Shocker
| Date | Winner | Event/Show | Note(s) |
| February 7 | Vacated | | |
| March 16 | Valiente and Volador Jr. | Homenaje a Dos Leyendas | |
| July 13 | Los Ingobernables (Rush and El Terrible) | Atlantis 35th Anniversary show | |
| November 18 | Diamante Azul and Valiente | Domingo Arena Mexico | |

CMLL Arena Coliseo Tag Team Championship
Incoming champions – Nuevo Generacion Dinamitas (El Cuatrero and Sansón)
| Date | Winner | Event/Show | Note(s) |
| February 14 | Vacated | | |
| March 10 | Esfinge and Tritón | Sabado Arena Coliseo | |

CMLL World Trios Championship
Incoming champions – Sky Team (Místico, Valiente and Volador Jr.)
| Date | Winner | Event/Show | Note(s) |
| July 1 | Los Guerreros Laguneros (Euforia, Gran Guerrero and Último Guerrero) | Domingos Arena México | |
| September 14 | The Cl4n (Ciber the Main Man, The Chris and Sharlie Rockstar) | CMLL 85th Anniversary Show | |
| September 28 | Los Guerreros Laguneros (Euforia, Gran Guerrero and Último Guerrero) | CMLL Super Viernes | |

CMLL World Women's Championship
Incoming champion – Dalys la Caribeña
| Date | Winner | Event/Show | Note(s) |
| November 19 | Marcela | Lunes Clásico | |

NWA World Historic Light Heavyweight Championship
Incoming champion – Hechicero
| Date | Winner | Event/Show | Note(s) |
| August 14 | Stuka Jr. | CMLL Martes de Area Mexico | |

NWA World Historic Middleweight Championship
Incoming champion – Último Guerrero
| Date | Winner | Event/Show | Note(s) |
| August 21 | Carístico | Nuevos Valores | |

NWA World Historic Welterweight Championship
Incoming champion – Volador Jr.
| Date | Winner | Event/Show | Note(s) |
| March 30 | Matt Taven | Super Viernes | |
| August 3 | Volador Jr. | Negro Casas 40th Anniversary Show | |

Occidente Heavyweight Championship
Incoming champion – Diamante Azul
| Date | Winner | Event/Show | Note(s) |
| March 13 | Furia Roja | CMLL Guadalajara Domingos | |

=== Impact Wrestling ===
Impact Global Championship
Incoming champion – Eli Drake
| Date | Winner | Event/Show | Note(s) |
| January 10 (aired February 1) | Austin Aries | Impact! | |
The title was renamed to Impact World Championship.
| April 22 | Pentagón Jr. | Redemption | This was a triple threat match also involving Rey Fenix |
| April 24 (aired May 31) | Austin Aries | Impact! Under Pressure | |
| October 14 | Johnny Impact | Bound for Glory | |

Impact X Division Championship
Incoming champion – Taiji Ishimori
| Date | Winner | Event/Show | Note(s) |
| January 12 (aired March 8) | Matt Sydal | Impact! Crossroads | This was a Title vs. Title match. |
| July 22 | Brian Cage | Slammiversary | |
| November 15 | Vacated | Impact! | Cage invoked Option C and challenged Johnny Impact for the Impact World Championship at the upcoming PPV Impact Wrestling Homecoming. |

Impact Knockouts Championship
Incoming champion – Laurel Van Ness
| Date | Winner | Event/Show | Note(s) |
| January 12 (aired March 8) | Allie | Impact! Crossroads | |
| April 24 (aired May 31) | Su Yung | Impact! Under Pressure | This was a Last Rites match. |
| August 12 (aired August 30) | Tessa Blanchard | Impact! ReDefined | This was a three-way match also involving Allie. Blanchard pinned Allie to win the title. |

Impact World Tag Team Championship
Incoming champions – The Latin American Xchange (Ortiz and Santana)
| Date | Winner | Event/Show | Note(s) |
| April 22 | Eli Drake and Scott Steiner | Redemption | Drake cashed in his Feast or Fired tag team title opportunity. |
| April 24 (aired May 17) | Z & E (Andrew Everett and DJ Z) | Impact! | |
| April 26 (aired June 21) | The Latin American Xchange (Ortiz and Santana) | Impact! | |

Impact Grand Championship
Incoming champion – Matt Sydal
| Date | Winner | Event/Show | Note(s) |
| January 14 (aired March 29) | Austin Aries | Impact! | This was a Title vs. Title match. |
| June 4 | Retired | N/A | Unified with Impact Global Championship |

=== IWRG ===
IWRG Intercontinental Heavyweight Championship
Incoming champion – Mr. Electro
| Date | Winner | Event/Show | Note(s) |
| December 21 | Mascara Ano 2000, Jr. | Guerra de Familias | |

IWRG Intercontinental Lightweight Championship
Incoming champion – Pantera I
| Date | Winner | Event/Show | Note(s) |
| August 5 | Vacated | N/A | Vacated due to inactivity from Pantera I |

IWRG Intercontinental Middleweight Championship
Incoming champion – Bombero Infernal
| Date | Winner | Event/Show | Note(s) |
| January 21 | Dr. Cerebro | IWRG Show | |
| September 9 | Imposible | Caravana de Campeones | |

IWRG Intercontinental Tag Team Championship
Incoming champions – Los Warriors (Black Warrior and Warrior Jr.)
| Date | Winner | Event/Show | Note(s) |
| March 11 | Rokambole Jr. and Villano V Jr. | IWRG Show | |
| November 25 | Capo del Norte and Capo del Sur | IWRG show | |

IWRG Intercontinental Trios Championship
Incoming champions – La Dinastía de la Muerte (Negro Navarro, Trauma I and Trauma II)
| Date | Winner | Event/Show | Note(s) |
| December 1 | Centella de Oro, Multifacético, and Prayer | Live event | |

IWRG Intercontinental Welterweight Championship
Incoming champion – Emperador Azteca
| Date | Winner | Event/Show | Note(s) |
| June 24 | Cerebro Negro | IWRG show | |

IWRG Junior de Juniors Championship
Incoming champion – Máscara Año 2000 Jr.
| Date | Winner | Event/Show | Note(s) |
| March 25 | El Hijo del Alebrije | IWRG Show | |
| September 9 | El Hijo de Canis Lupus | Caravana de Campeones | |

IWRG Rey del Aire Championship
(Title created)
| Date | Winner | Event/Show | Note(s) |
| January 1 | Aramís | IWRG 22nd Anniversary Show | Won a steel cage match to become the first champion |
| September 2 | Dragón Bane | IWRG Show | |

IWRG Rey del Ring Championship
Incoming champion – Imposible
| Date | Winner | Event/Show | Note(s) |
| May 20 | Vacated | Rey del Ring | Vacated for the 2018 tournament |
| May 20 | Emperador Azteca | Rey del Ring | |

Distrito Federal Trios Championship
Incoming champions – Los Comandos Elite (Oficial Rayan, Oficial Spector and Oficial Liderk)
No title changes

=== Lucha Libre AAA Worldwide ===
AAA Mega Championship
Incoming champion – Johnny Mundo
| Date | Winner | Event/Show | Note(s) |
| January 26 | Dr. Wagner Jr. | Guerra de Titanes | |
| June 3 | Jeff Jarrett | Verano de Escándalo | Triple threat match, also involving Rey Mysterio Jr. |
| August 25 | Fénix | Triplemanía XXVI | This was a four-way match, also involving Brian Cage and Rich Swann. |

AAA World Cruiserweight Championship
Incoming champion – Lanzelot
| Date | Winner | Event/Show | Note(s) |
| January 26 | Australian Suicide | Guerra de Titanes | |
| August 25 | Sammy Guevara | Triplemanía XXVI | This was a four-way match, also involving A. C. H. and Shane Strickland. |

AAA World Mini-Estrella Championship
Incoming champion – Mini Psycho Clown
No title changes

AAA Latin American Championship
Incoming champion – El Hijo del Fantasma
| Date | Winner | Event/Show | Note(s) |
| December 2 | Drago | Guerra de Titanes | |

AAA Reina de Reinas Championship
Incoming champion – Lady Shani
| Date | Winner | Event/Show | Note(s) |
| January 26 | Faby Apache | Guerra de Titanes | |
| December 2 | Lady Shani | Guerra de Titanes | This was a four-way match, also involving La Hiedra and Scarlett Bordeaux. |

AAA World Tag Team Championship
Incoming champions – Dark Family (Cuervo and Scoria)
| Date | Winner | Event/Show | Note(s) |
| March 25 | El Texano Jr. and Rey Escorpión | AAA Worldwide | |

AAA World Mixed Tag Team Championship
Incoming champions – Big Mami and Niño Hamburguesa
No title changes

AAA World Trios Championship
Incoming champions – Los OGT (Averno, Chessman and Super Fly)
| Date | Winner | Event/Show | Note(s) |
| January 26 | El Poder del Norte (Carta Brava Jr., Mocho Cota Jr. and Tito Santana) | Guerra de Titanes | |
| December 2 | El Hijo del Vikingo, Laredo Kid and Myzteziz Jr. | Guerra de Titanes | |

=== MLW ===
MLW World Heavyweight Championship
Incoming champion – Vacant
| Date | Winner | Event/Show | Note(s) |
| April 12 | Shane Strickland | The World Championship Finals | Defeated Matt Riddle in the finals of an eight-man single-elimination tournament to win the vacant championship. |
| July 12 (aired July 20) | Low Ki | Fusion | |

MLW World Tag Team Championship
Incoming champion – Vacant
| Date | Winner | Event/Show | Note(s) |
| June 7 (aired June 15) | Lucha Brothers (Pentagón Jr. and Rey Fénix) | Fusion | Defeated Team TBD (Jason Cade and Jimmy Yuta) and The Dirty Blondes (Leo Brien and Michael Patrick) in a three-way elimination match to become the new champions. |

MLW World Middleweight Championship
(Title created)
| Date | Winner | Event/Show | Note(s) |
| July 19 | Maxwell Jacob Friedman | Battle Riot | Defeated Joey Ryan to become the inaugural champion. |
| December 7 | Vacated | N/A | Maxwell Jacob Friedman vacated the title after an elbow injury. |
| December 14 | Teddy Hart | Zero Hour | |

=== NJPW ===
IWGP Heavyweight Championship
Incoming champion – Kazuchika Okada
| Date | Winner | Event/Show | Note(s) |
| June 9 | Kenny Omega | Dominion 6.9 in Osaka-jo Hall | This was a no time limit, best-of-three falls match. |

IWGP Intercontinental Championship
Incoming champion – Hiroshi Tanahashi
| Date | Winner | Event/Show | Note(s) |
| January 27 | Minoru Suzuki | The New Beginning in Sapporo | |
| April 29 | Tetsuya Naito | Wrestling Hinokuni | |
| June 9 | Chris Jericho | Dominion 6.9 in Osaka-jo Hall | |

IWGP United States Heavyweight Championship
Incoming champion – Kenny Omega
| Date | Winner | Event/Show | Note(s) |
| January 28 | Jay White | The New Beginning in Sapporo | |
| July 7 | Juice Robinson | G1 Special in San Francisco | |
| September 30 | Cody | Fighting Spirit Unleashed | |

IWGP Tag Team Championship
Incoming champions – K.E.S. (Davey Boy Smith Jr. and Lance Archer)
| Date | Winner | Event/Show | Note(s) |
| January 4 | Los Ingobernables de Japón (Evil and Sanada) | Wrestle Kingdom 12 | |
| June 9 | The Young Bucks (Matt and Nick Jackson) | Dominion 6.9 in Osaka-jo Hall | |
| September 30 | Guerrillas of Destiny (Tama Tonga and Tanga Loa) | Fighting Spirit Unleashed | |

IWGP Junior Heavyweight Championship
Incoming champion – Marty Scurll
| Date | Winner | Event/Show | Note(s) |
| January 4 | Will Ospreay | Wrestle Kingdom 12 | This was a four-way match, also involving Hiromu Takahashi and Kushida. |
| June 9 | Hiromu Takahashi | Dominion 6.9 in Osaka-jo Hall | |
| August 20 | Vacated | N/A | |
| October 8 | Kushida | King of Pro-Wrestling | |

IWGP Junior Heavyweight Tag Team Championship
Incoming champions – Roppongi 3K (Sho and Yoh)
| Date | Winner | Event/Show | Note(s) |
| January 4 | The Young Bucks (Matt and Nick Jackson) | Wrestle Kingdom 12 | |
| January 28 | Roppongi 3K (Sho and Yoh) | The New Beginning in Sapporo | |
| March 6 | Suzuki-gun (El Desperado and Yoshinobu Kanemaru) | Anniversary Show | |

NEVER Openweight Championship
Incoming champion – Minoru Suzuki
| Date | Winner | Event/Show | Note(s) |
| January 4 | Hirooki Goto | Wrestle Kingdom 12 | |
| June 9 | Michael Elgin | Dominion 6.9 in Osaka-jo Hall | This was a three-way match, also involving Taichi. |
| June 17 | Hirooki Goto | Kizuna Road | |
| September 17 | Taichi Ishikari | Destruction in Beppu | |
| November 3 | Hirooki Goto | Power Struggle | |
| December 9 | Kota Ibushi | World Tag League | |

NEVER Openweight 6-Man Tag Team Championship
Incoming champions – Bullet Club (Bad Luck Fale, Tama Tonga, and Tanga Loa)
| Date | Winner | Event/Show | Note(s) |
| January 4 | Chaos (Beretta, Tomohiro Ishii, and Toru Yano) | Wrestle Kingdom 12 | |
| January 5 | Bullet Club (Bad Luck Fale, Tama Tonga, and Tanga Loa) | New Year Dash!! | |
| May 3 | Super Villains (Marty Scurll, Nick Jackson, and Matt Jackson) | Wrestling Dontaku | |
| August 12 | Bullet Club OG (Tama Tonga, Tanga Loa and Taiji Ishimori) | G1 Climax 28 | |

=== NWA ===
NWA Worlds Heavyweight Championship
Incoming champion – Nick Aldis
| Date | Winner | Event/Show | Note(s) |
| September 1 | Cody | All In | |
| October 21 | Nick Aldis | NWA 70th Anniversary Show | Two out of three falls match. |

NWA World Women's Championship
Incoming champion – Jazz
No title changes

NWA National Heavyweight Championship
Incoming champion – Vacant
| Date | Winner | Event/Show | Note(s) |
| October 21 | Willie Mack | NWA 70th Anniversary Show | Defeated Sam Shaw in the finals of an eight-man tournament to win the vacant championship. |

=== ROH ===
ROH World Championship
Incoming champion – Dalton Castle
| Date | Winner | Event/Show | Note(s) |
| June 30 | Jay Lethal | Ring of Honor Wrestling | This was a four-way match, also involving Cody and Matt Taven. |

ROH World Television Championship
Incoming champion – Silas Young
| Date | Winner | Event/Show | Note(s) |
| February 10 | Kenny King | Ring of Honor Wrestling | |
| April 7 | Silas Young | Supercard of Honor XII | |
| June 16 | Punishment Martinez | State of the Art, Day 2 | |
| September 29 | Jeff Cobb | Ring of Honor Wrestling | |

ROH World Tag Team Championship
Incoming champions – The Motor City Machine Guns (Alex Shelley and Chris Sabin)
| Date | Winner | Event/Show | Note(s) |
| March 9 | The Briscoe Brothers (Jay Briscoe and Mark Briscoe) | ROH 16th Anniversary Show | |
| October 14 | SoCal Uncensored (Frankie Kazarian and Scorpio Sky) | Glory By Honor XVI: Philadelphia | |
| December 14 | The Briscoe Brothers (Jay Briscoe and Mark Briscoe) | Final Battle | This was a Ladder War IX, also involving The Young Bucks (Matt Jackson and Nick Jackson). |

ROH World Six-Man Tag Team Championship
Incoming champions – The Hung Bucks (Adam Page, Matt Jackson, and Nick Jackson)
| Date | Winner | Event/Show | Note(s) |
| March 9 | SoCal Uncensored (Christopher Daniels, Frankie Kazarian, and Scorpio Sky) | ROH 16th Anniversary Show | |
| May 9 | The Kingdom (Matt Taven, T. K. O'Ryan, and Vinny Marseglia) | ROH/NJPW War of the Worlds Tour | |
| July 21 | Bullet Club/The Elite (Cody, Matt Jackson, and Nick Jackson) | Ring of Honor Wrestling | |
| November 4 | The Kingdom (Matt Taven, T. K. O'Ryan, and Vinny Marseglia) | Survival of the Fittest | |

Women of Honor Championship
Incoming champion – N/A
| Date | Winner | Event/Show | Note(s) |
| April 7 | Sumie Sakai | Supercard of Honor XII | |
| December 14 | Kelly Klein | Final Battle | This was a Four Corner Survival match, also involving Karen Q and Madison Rayne. |

=== The Crash Lucha Libre ===
The Crash Heavyweight Championship
Incoming champion – Rey Mysterio
| Date | Winner | Event/Show | Note(s) |
| October 7 | Vacated | N/A | Vacated when Rey Mysterio began working for WWE full-time |
| November 3 | Willie Mack | The Crash VII Aniversario | Defeated Bárbaro Cavernario, Michael Elgin, and El Mesías to win the vacant championship. |

The Crash Cruiserweight Championship
Incoming champion – Rey Fénix
| Date | Winner | Event/Show | Note(s) |
| April 15 | Vacated | N/A | Rey Fénix announced that he was moving up to the heavyweight division |
| May 19 | Bandido | The Crash show | Defeated Laredo Kid and Dezmond Xavier to win the vacant championship |

The Crash Junior Championship
Incoming champion – Black Boy
| Date | Winner | Event/Show | Note(s) |
| March 17 | Vacated | N/A | Declared vacant when Black Boy did not show up for a scheduled championship defense |
| March 17 | Astrolux | The Crash show | Won a six-way elimination match over Tiago, Latigo, Rayo Star, and Torito Negro to win the vacant championship |
| May 20 | Torito Negro | The Crash Show | |
| November 3 | Xperia | The Crash VII Aniversario | Match also included Tiago, Baby Star, and Rayo Star |

The Crash Tag Team Championship
Incoming champions – Vacant
| Date | Winner | Event/Show | Note(s) |
| March 17 | Mexablood (Bandido and Flamita) | The Crash show | Defeated Aeroboy and Septimo Dragon and Dezmond Xavier and Zachary Wentz in a Three way match to win the vacate titles. |
| October 7 | Vacated | N/A | Championship declared vacant for undocumented reasons |
| November 3 | Los Lucha Bros (The King and Penta 0M) | The Crash VII Aniversario | Defeated Nueva Generacio Dinamita (El Cuatrero and Sansón) and Reno Scum (Adam Thornstowe and Luster the Legend) in Three way match to win the vacant titles. |
| November 27 | Vacated | N/A | Championship declared vacant when The King was injured and not able to compete. |

The Crash Women's Championship
Incoming champion – Keira
| Date | Winner | Event/Show | Note(s) |
| January 20 | Lacey Lane | The Crash show | |
| July 14 | Tessa Blanchard | The Crash show | This was a Three-way match, also involving Santana Garrett |

=== WWE ===
– Raw
– SmackDown
– NXT
– NXT UK

==== Raw and SmackDown ====
Raw and SmackDown each had a world championship, a secondary championship, a women's championship, and a male tag team championship. Raw also had a championship for their cruiserweight wrestlers, which became exclusive to the 205 Live brand.

WWE Universal Championship
Incoming champion – Brock Lesnar
| Date | Winner | Event/Show | Note(s) |
| August 19 | Roman Reigns | SummerSlam | |
| October 22 | Vacated | Monday Night Raw | Title was vacated after Roman Reigns went on a hiatus due to his ongoing battle with leukemia |
| November 2 | Brock Lesnar | Crown Jewel | Defeated Braun Strowman to win the vacant title. Before relinquishing the title, Roman Reigns was originally scheduled to defend the title in a triple threat match at this event against Lesnar and Strowman. |

WWE Championship
Incoming champion – AJ Styles
| Date | Winner | Event/Show | Note(s) |
| November 13 | Daniel Bryan | SmackDown Live | |

WWE Intercontinental Championship
Incoming champion – Roman Reigns
| Date | Winner | Event/Show | Note(s) |
| January 22 | The Miz | Raw 25 Years | |
| April 8 | Seth Rollins | WrestleMania 34 | Triple threat match, also involving Finn Bálor. |
| June 18 | Dolph Ziggler | Monday Night Raw | |
| August 19 | Seth Rollins | SummerSlam | |
| December 16 | Dean Ambrose | TLC: Tables, Ladders & Chairs | |

WWE United States Championship
Incoming champion – Vacant
| Date | Winner | Event/Show | Note(s) |
| January 16 | Bobby Roode | SmackDown Live | Defeated Jinder Mahal in a tournament final to win the vacant title. |
| March 11 | Randy Orton | Fastlane | |
| April 8 | Jinder Mahal | WrestleMania 34 | Fatal four-way match, also involving Bobby Roode and Rusev. |
The title became exclusive to the Raw brand following day one of the Superstar Shake-up when Jinder Mahal was drafted to Raw.
| April 16 | Jeff Hardy | Monday Night Raw | |
The title returned to the SmackDown brand following day two of the Superstar Shake-up when Jeff Hardy was drafted to SmackDown.
| July 15 | Shinsuke Nakamura | Extreme Rules | |
| December 18 (aired December 25) | Rusev | SmackDown Live | |

WWE Raw Women's Championship
Incoming champion – Alexa Bliss
| Date | Winner | Event/Show | Note(s) |
| April 8 | Nia Jax | WrestleMania 34 | |
| June 17 | Alexa Bliss | Money in the Bank | Cashed in her Money in the Bank contract. |
| August 19 | Ronda Rousey | SummerSlam | |

WWE SmackDown Women's Championship
Incoming champion – Charlotte Flair
| Date | Winner | Event/Show | Note(s) |
| April 10 | Carmella | SmackDown Live | Cashed in her Money in the Bank contract. |
| August 19 | Charlotte Flair | SummerSlam | Triple threat match, also involving Becky Lynch. |
| September 16 | Becky Lynch | Hell in a Cell | |
| December 16 | Asuka | TLC: Tables, Ladders & Chairs | Triple threat Tables, Ladders, and Chairs match, also involving Charlotte Flair. |

WWE Raw Tag Team Championship
Incoming champions – Jason Jordan and Seth Rollins
| Date | Winner | Event/Show | Note(s) |
| January 28 | Cesaro and Sheamus | Royal Rumble | |
| April 8 | Braun Strowman and Nicholas | WrestleMania 34 | Nicholas was a young fan in the audience who was "chosen" by Strowman. |
| April 9 | Vacated | Monday Night Raw | Strowman and Nicholas voluntarily relinquished the titles due to Nicholas' schedule as a fourth-grader. |
| April 27 | Matt Hardy and Bray Wyatt | Greatest Royal Rumble | Defeated Cesaro and Sheamus to win the vacant titles. |
| July 15 | The B-Team (Bo Dallas and Curtis Axel) | Extreme Rules | |
| September 3 | Dolph Ziggler and Drew McIntyre | Monday Night Raw | |
| October 22 | Dean Ambrose and Seth Rollins | Monday Night Raw | |
| November 5 | AOP (Akam and Rezar) | Monday Night Raw | Defeated Seth Rollins in a 2-on-1 handicap match; Rollins' co-champion Dean Ambrose turned on him two weeks prior, leaving Rollins to the defend the titles himself |
| December 10 | Bobby Roode and Chad Gable | Monday Night Raw | 3-on-2 handicap match, also involving AOP's manager Drake Maverick. Roode pinned Maverick to win AOP's titles. |

WWE SmackDown Tag Team Championship
Incoming champions – The Usos (Jey and Jimmy Uso)
| Date | Winner | Event/Show | Note(s) |
| April 8 | The Bludgeon Brothers (Harper and Rowan) | WrestleMania 34 | Triple threat tag team match, also involving The New Day (represented by Big E and Kofi Kingston). |
| August 21 | The New Day (Big E, Kofi Kingston, and Xavier Woods) | SmackDown Live | No Disqualification match. Kingston and Woods won the match, but Big E was also recognized as champion under the Freebird Rule. |
| October 16 | The Bar (Cesaro and Sheamus) | SmackDown 1000 | Big E and Xavier Woods represented The New Day. |

WWE Cruiserweight Championship
Incoming champion – Enzo Amore
| Date | Winner | Event/Show | Note(s) |
| January 23 | Vacated | – | Title was vacated after Enzo Amore was released from his contract following publicized accusations of sexual assault |
| April 8 | Cedric Alexander | WrestleMania 34 | Defeated Mustafa Ali in the Cruiserweight Championship tournament final to win the vacant title. |
Since late May, WWE's cruiserweight division began to wrestle exclusively on 205 Live and ceased to appear on Raw. As a result, the Cruiserweight Championship became exclusive to the 205 Live brand.
| October 6 | Buddy Murphy | Super Show-Down | |

==== NXT ====
NXT Championship
Incoming champion – Andrade "Cien" Almas
| Date | Winner | Event/Show | Note(s) |
| April 7 | Aleister Black | TakeOver: New Orleans | |
| July 18 (aired July 25) | Tommaso Ciampa | NXT | |

NXT North American Championship
(Title created)
| Date | Winner | Event/Show | Note(s) |
| April 7 | Adam Cole | TakeOver: New Orleans | Defeated EC3, Killian Dain, Ricochet, Lars Sullivan, and Velveteen Dream in a six-way ladder match to determine the inaugural champion. |
| August 18 | Ricochet | TakeOver: Brooklyn IV | |

NXT Women's Championship
Incoming champion – Ember Moon
| Date | Winner | Event/Show | Note(s) |
| April 7 | Shayna Baszler | TakeOver: New Orleans | |
| August 18 | Kairi Sane | TakeOver: Brooklyn IV | |
| October 28 | Shayna Baszler | Evolution | |

NXT Tag Team Championship
Incoming champions – The Undisputed Era (Bobby Fish, Kyle O'Reilly, and Roderick Strong)
| Date | Winner | Event/Show | Note(s) |
| June 19 (aired June 26) | Moustache Mountain (Tyler Bate and Trent Seven) | United Kingdom Championship Tournament | Roderick Strong and Kyle O'Reilly represented The Undisputed Era. |
| June 21 (aired July 11) | The Undisputed Era (Kyle O'Reilly and Roderick Strong) | NXT | Won by submission when Tyler Bate threw in the towel. |

==== NXT UK ====
WWE United Kingdom Championship
Incoming champion – Pete Dunne
No title changes

NXT UK Women's Championship
(Title created)
| Date | Winner | Event/Show | Note(s) |
| August 26 (aired November 28) | Rhea Ripley | NXT UK | Defeated Toni Storm in the finals of an eight-woman tournament to become the inaugural champion. |

== Awards and honors ==
=== AAA ===
==== AAA Hall of Fame ====
| Year | Ring name (Birth name) | AAA recognized accolades |
|---|---|---|
| 2018 | Villano III (Arturo Díaz Mendoza) | Posthumous Inductee: Two-time AAA Americas Trios Champion, One-time Mexican National Atómicos Champion. Known for being part of Los Villanos stable. |
| 2018 | El Apache (Mario Balbuena González) | Posthumous Inductee: Two-time AAA World Mixed Tag Team Champion, one-time AAA World Trios Champion |
| 2018 | Dr. Alfonso Morales | Announcer known for his work in AAA and CMLL |

=== WWE ===
==== WWE Hall of Fame ====
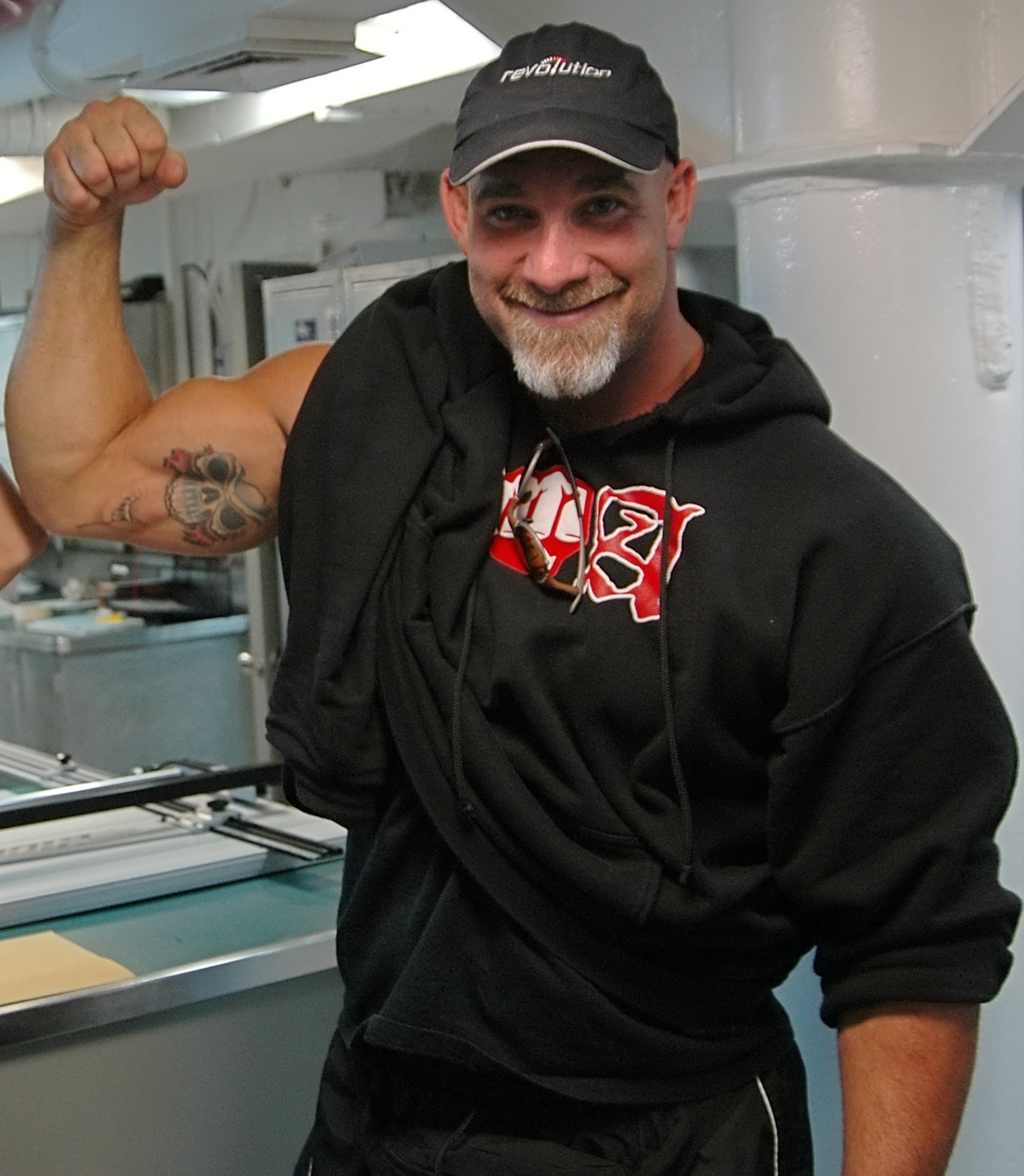
2018 Hall of Fame inductee, Goldberg

| Category | Inductee | Inducted by |
|---|---|---|
| Individual | Goldberg | Paul Heyman |
| Individual | Ivory | Molly Holly |
| Individual | Jeff Jarrett | Road Dogg |
| Individual | Hillbilly Jim | Jimmy Hart |
| Individual | Mark Henry | Big Show |
| Group | The Dudley Boyz (Bubba Ray and D-Von Dudley) | Edge and Christian |
| Warrior Award | Jarrius "JJ" Robertson | Dana Warrior |
| Celebrity | Kid Rock | Triple H |
| Legacy | Boris Malenko | N/A |
| Legacy | Cora Combs | N/A |
| Legacy | Dara Singh | N/A |
| Legacy | El Santo | N/A |
| Legacy | Hiro Matsuda | N/A |
| Legacy | Jim Londos | N/A |
| Legacy | Rufus R. Jones | N/A |
| Legacy | Sputnik Monroe | N/A |
| Legacy | Stan Stasiak | N/A |
| Legacy | Lord Alfred Hayes | N/A |

== Debuts ==
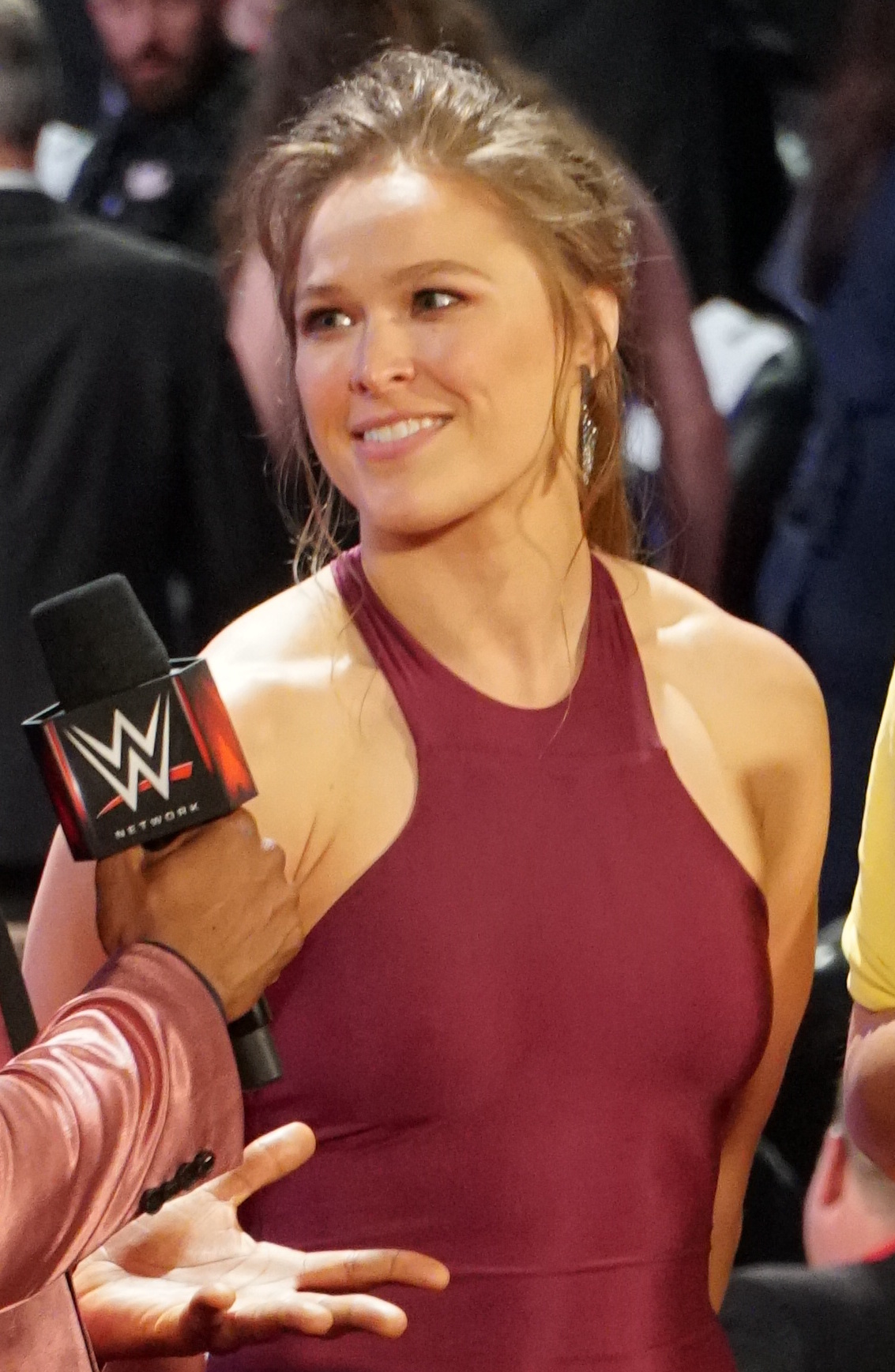
Ronda Rousey

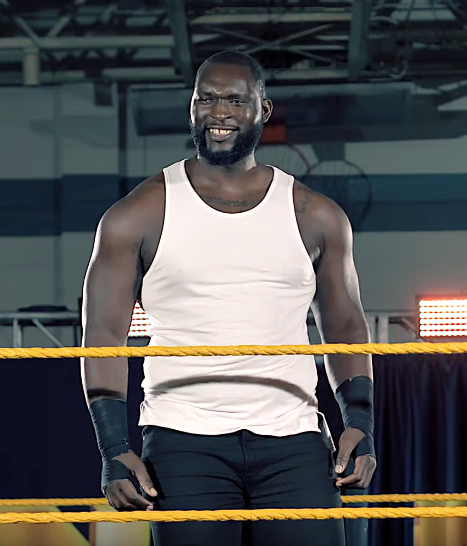
Omos

- Roxanne Perez
- January 2 – Takuho Kato
- January 4 – Hikari Noa and Miu Watanabe
- January 8 – Peter Tihanyi
- January 26 – Je'Von Evans
- January 28 – Bryan Ishizaka
- February 3
  - Akira Hyodo
  - Yuki Ishikawa
- February 10 – Nico Angelo
- February 27 – Man Like DeReiss
- February 24
  - Edith Surreal
  - Kanji
- March 4 – Charles Crowley
- March 9 – Ethan Allen
- March 30 – The DKC
- April 8
  - Ronda Rousey
  - Momo Tani
- April 10
  - Yuya Uemura
  - Yota Tsuji
- April 22
  - Rina Shingaki
  - Tatsuya Hanami
- April 27 - Nick Wayne
- April 29 – Solo Sikoa
- May 3 – Yuki Aino
- May 13 – Rina Amikura
- May 27 – Mei Suruga
- May 30 – Jacy Jayne
- June 2 – Aliss Ink
- June 11 – Kota Minoura
- June 16 – Luke Jacobs
- July 3 – Janai Kai
- July 18 – Omos
- July 18 – Ancham
- July 29 – Titus Alexander
- August 5
  - Mina Shirakawa
  - Yoshiki Inamura
- August 8 – Kohaku
- August 12 – Utami Hayashishita
- August 18 – Levaniel
- September 2 – Ryuki Honda
- September 19 – Myla Grace
- October 11 – Nikkita Lyons
- October 28
  - Jessamyn Duke
  - Marina Shafir
  - Yuki Arai
- October 31 – Daichi Sato
- November 6 – Dragon Dia
- November 15
  - Misa Matsui
  - Riko Kawahata
  - Yuko Sakurai
- November 17
  - Haruna Neko
  - Hokuto Omori
- November 18 – Mei Hoshizuki
- November 19 – Momoka Hanazono
- December 18 – Malik Blade (NXT)
- November 23 – Slice Boogie
- November 24 – Pom Harajuku
- December 24 – Maria
- December 9 - Cora Jade
- December 25 – Naoki Kamata
- December 31
  - Banny Oikawa
  - Suzu Suzuki

== Retirements ==
- Aoi Kizuki (2005–2018)
- Azusa Takigawa (2015–2018)
- Bob Backlund (1973–1985, 1988–2001, 2007–2011, 2018)
- Mark Henry (March 11, 1996 – April 27, 2018)
- Great Khali (October 7, 2000 – April 27, 2018)
- Mika Iida (November 21, 2010 – May 4, 2018)
- Great Kabuki (1964–September 30, 2018)
- Daigoro Kashiwa (2001–2018)
- Gene Snitsky (1997–2018)
- Chicky Starr (1975–2018)
- Mark Jindrak (1999–2018)
- Keiko Aono (1996–2018)
- Maho Kurone (2016–2018)
- Hiro Tonai (2006–2018)

== Deaths ==
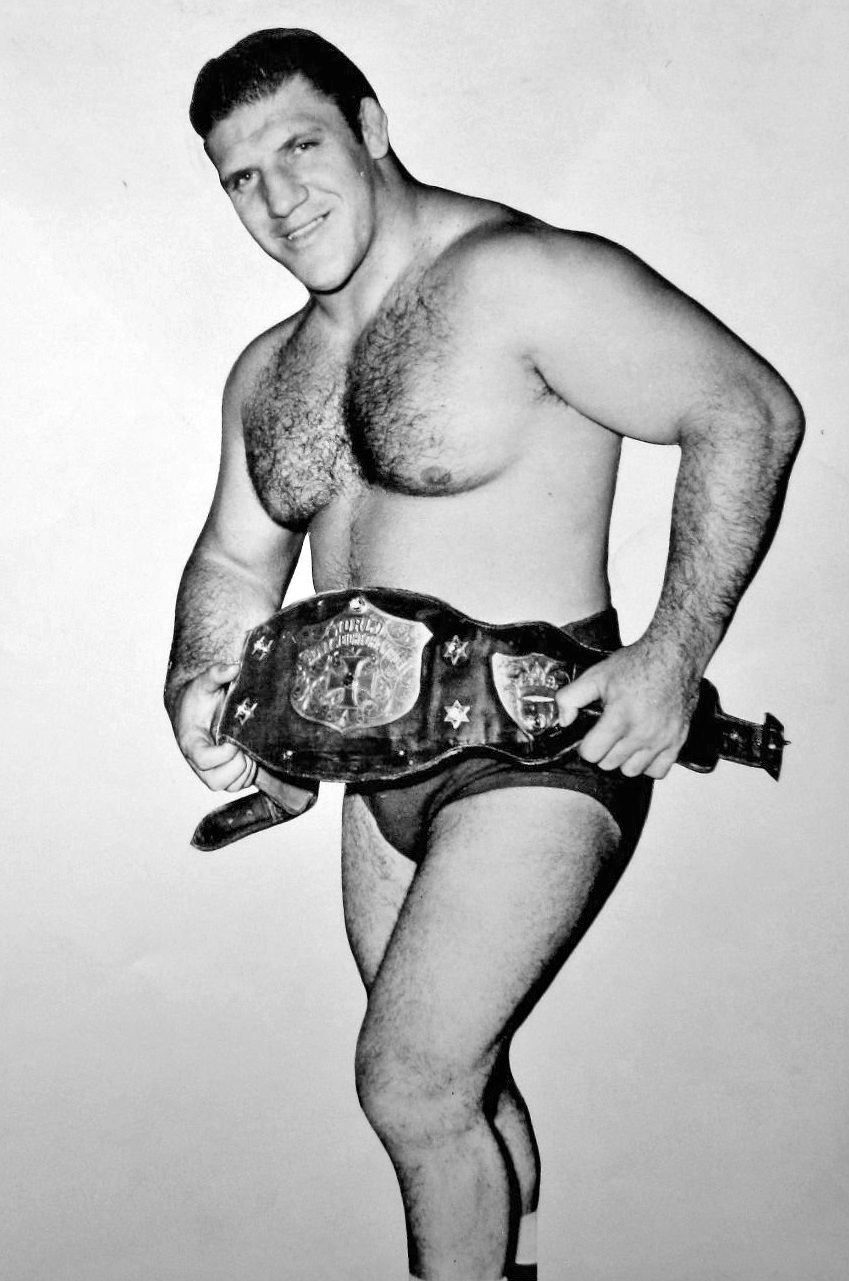
Bruno Sammartino

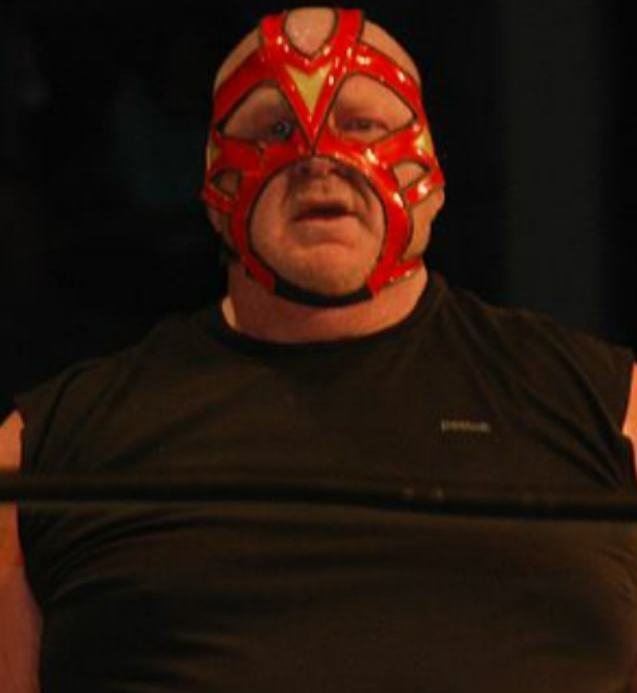
Big Van Vader

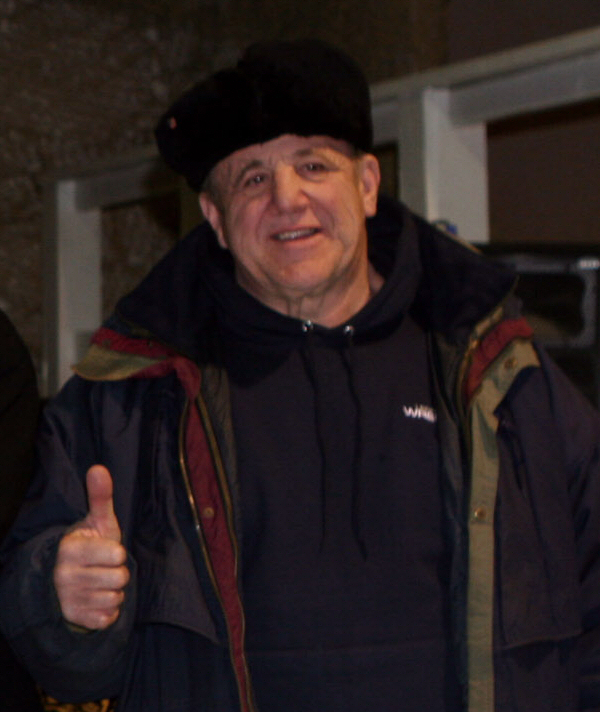
Nikolai Volkoff

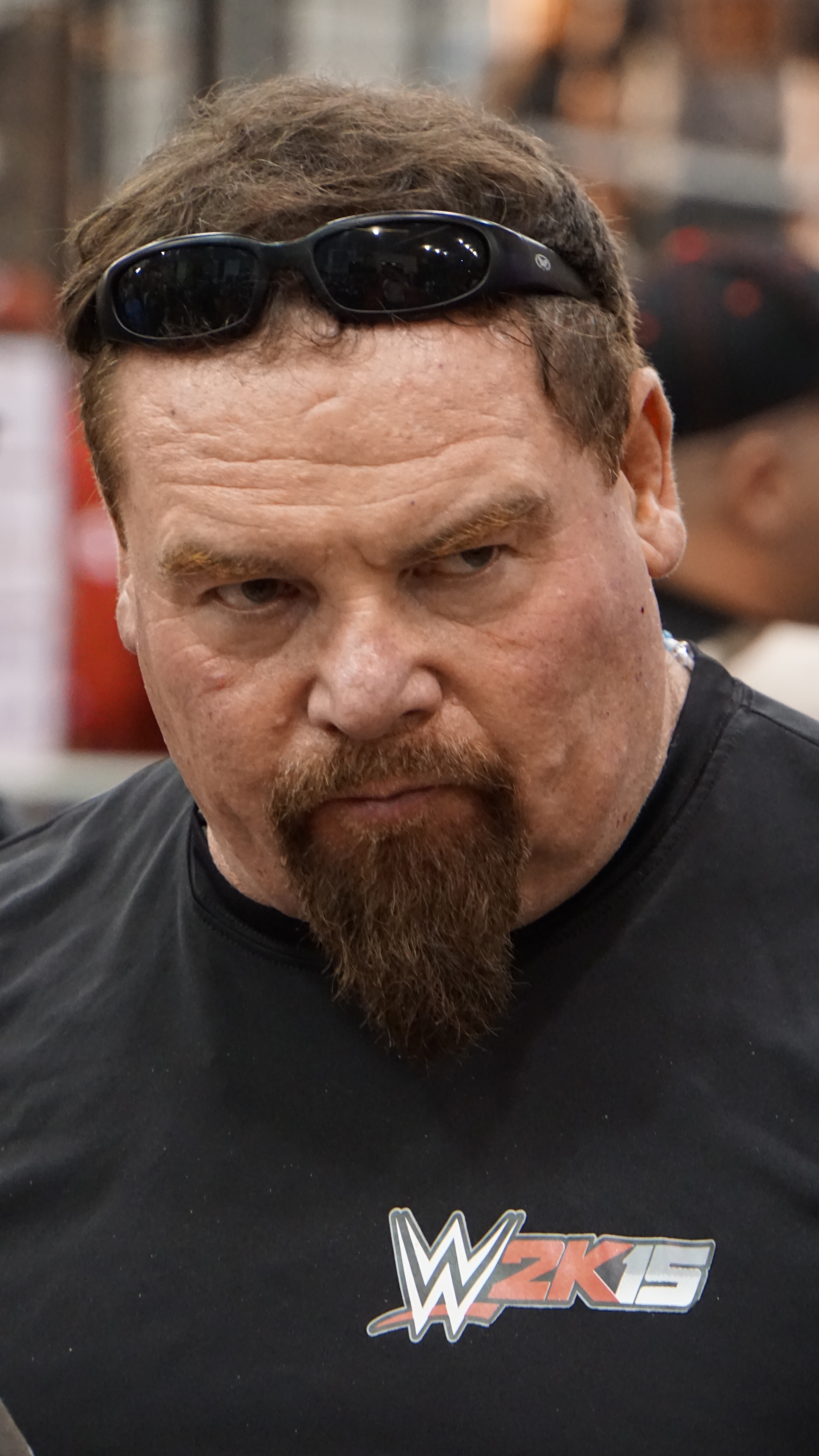
Jim Neidhart

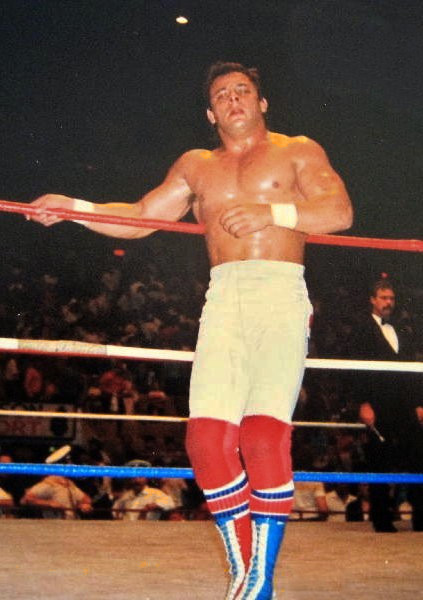
Dynamite Kid

- January 2 – Mountain Fiji, 60
- April 4 – Johnny Valiant, 71
- April 18
  - Bruno Sammartino, 82
  - Paul Jones, 75
- April 21 – Neff Maivia, 93
- May 1 – Universo 2000, 55
- May 8 – Big Bully Busick, 63
- June 1 – Rockin' Rebel, 52
- June 13 – Arkangel de la Muerte, 52
- June 18 – Big Van Vader, 63
- June 29 – Matt Cappotelli, 38
- July 8 – Piratita Morgan, 49
- July 14 – Masa Saito, 76
- July 19 – Rayo de Jalisco Sr., 85
- July 29
  - Brickhouse Brown, 57
  - Nikolai Volkoff, 70
  - Brian Christopher, 46
- August 3 - Picudo, 51
- August 9 – Brian Danovich, 38
- August 10 – Steve Travis, 67
- August 13
  - Jim Neidhart, 63
  - Ian Dean, 48
- August 21 – Villano III, 66
- August 22 – Chris Champion, 57
- August 27 – Aya Koyama, 45
- August 30 – Ray, 36
- September 1 - Nate Hatred, 39
- September 4 – Lee Wang-pyo, 64
- September 5 – Mike Hogewood, 63
- September 9 – Frank Andersson, 62
- September 14 – Ethel Johnson, 83
- October 8:
  - Wajima Hiroshi, 70
  - Leroy Howard, 50
- October 13 – Don Leo Jonathan, 87
- October 18 – Dick Slater, 67
- November 6 – José Lothario, 83
- November 18 - Tomás Marín, 84
- November 25 – Larry Matysik, 71
- December 5 – Dynamite Kid, 60
- December 6 – Larry Hennig, 82
- December 12 – Rene Lasartesse, 90
- December 13 – Bill Fralic, 56
- December 19 – Raúl Mata, 71
- December 21 – Cowboy Bob Ellis, 89
- December 29 – Dieusel Berto, 60

== See also ==
- List of GFW events and specials
- List of MLW events
- List of NWA pay-per-view events
- List of NJPW pay-per-view events
- List of ROH pay-per-view events
- List of Impact Wrestling pay-per-view events
- List of WWE Network events
- List of WWE pay-per-view events
