= Multibronce =

Mexican professional wrestler

Personal information
- Born: September 21, 1998 (age 27) Pachuca, Hidalgo, Mexico
- Family: Vengador (father); Halcón Negro (brother); Halcón Suicida (brother); Chica Dinamita (cousin); Pequeño Ángel (cousin)
- Website: Facebook page

Professional wrestling career
- Ring name(s): Gotita de Plata; Máscara de Bronce; Multibronce
- Billed height: 1.70 m (5 ft 7 in)
- Billed weight: 62 kg (137 lb)
- Trained by: Campesino del Valle; Vengador; Aero Star
- Debut: November 5, 2012

Multibronce (born September 21, 1998) is a Mexican professional wrestler. He previously worked for Lucha Libre AAA Worldwide (AAA) as Máscara de Bronce (Spanish for "Bronze Mask") as a tecnico (Mexican term for those that portray the "good guys"). Multibronce has also previously worked for the International Wrestling League (IWL). Prior to October 2016 he worked as the masked Gotita de Plata (Spanish for "Silver Droplet") character, first in the Mini-Estrella and then in the regular sized division.

Multibronce's birth name is not a matter of public record, as is often the case with masked wrestlers in Mexico where their private lives are kept a secret from the wrestling fans. (Note: In Mexico newspapers and magazines do not report masked wrestlers real names even if they could find out through research, nor do they show clear pictures where you can see most or all of the face of a masked wrestler, normally blurring it out.)

== Personal life ==
He is from Pachuca, Hidalgo, Mexico. While masked wrestlers in Mexico often do not reveal a lot about their personal life Multibronce has confirmed that he is the son of Hidalgo wrestler El Vengador and the brother of wrestlers Halcón Negro (Note: Not related to the Halcón Negro Jr. who wrestled in the 1990s) and Halcón Suicida as well as the cousin of Pequeño Ángel and female wrestler Chica Dinamita.

== Professional wrestling career ==
Using the name Gotita de Plata he made his in-ring debut on November 5, 2012, against Rayito del Sol (Little Ray of Sunshine), making him only 14 years old at the time. To obscure the fact that he was only 14 when he began wrestling he was booked as a Mini-Estrella, working with other wrestlers who were not necessarily little people but generally short of stature. His early matches were closely monitored by his father and older brothers, only working the occasional match while still in school. Lucha Libre AAA Worldwide (AAA), one of Mexico's largest wrestling promotions, held the 2012 version of their Quien Pinta Para La Corona ("Who Desires the Crown") competition, a contest used to evaluate young wrestlers and invite the top prospects to work a match or two for AAA show before the judges chose the best male, female and Mini-Estrella to get an AAA contract. For the 2012 version AAA visited Monterrey, Campeche, Puebla and Guadalajara to evaluate wrestlers, it is not clear which location Gotita de Plata auditioned in or if he was invited to wrestle a tryout match in some other way. The actual try out matches took place on September 12, 2012, in Mexico City in front of a panel of AAA judges and officials. In the first match Gotita de Plata teamed up with fellow Mini-Estrellas Lucky Boy and Rey Celestial, losing to Heylex, Mini Excorcista and Los Gemelos Muertes (who did not compete in the Mini-Estrella division). (Note: Records are not clear on who the fourth person on Gotita's team was.) Later in the night Gotita de Plata, Pequeño Bonsai and Rey Celestial defeated the team of Heylex, Mini Diamond and Mini Exorcista. In the end Rey Celestial won the Minis division contest, but Gotita de Plata impressed the AAA officials enough that they brought him back in May 2013 as part of the regular sized division, teaming with Flamita and Saturno to defeat the team of Carta Brava Jr., Danny Casas and Eterno in the opening match of the show. Following his experiences with AAA Gotita de Plata began working in the regular sized division full-time, working for the International Wrestling League (IWL) in 2013. On the IWL 3rd Anniversary Show he lost to Flyer in the third match of the night. In late 2014 he returned to AAA and began working opening show matches for AAA television tapings, often with opening match wrestlers such as Argenis, Ludxor, Venum and Niño Hamburguesa as he continues his in-ring training, supervised by AAA high flyer Aero Star.

=== Máscara de Bronce (2016-2020) ===
On October 28, 2016, AAA presented Gotita de Plata under a new ring character, "Máscara de Bronce" ("Bronze Mask") complete with a new mask and full body suit. He teamed up with Aerostar and Venum, losing to Super Fly, Parka Negra and Dave the Clown. In 2017, he joined Venum's "La Nueva Real Fuerza Aerea" group with Lancelot. During subsequent event in Irapuato, Bronce failed to capture the GFW World Heavyweight Championship from Eli Drake

On July 10, 2020, Bronce announced his departure from the promotion through social networks during the COVID-19 pandemic.

=== Multibronce (2020–) ===
In November 2020 he announced that he had changed his name to Multibronce with a completely new mask design and attire, and started working for the Hidalgo-based promotion Lucha Libre Vanguardia.
