= World Tag League (NJPW) =

Professional wrestling tag team tournament

World Tag League trophy

The World Tag League (WORLDタッグリーグ, WORLD taggurīgu) is a professional wrestling round-robin tag team tournament held by New Japan Pro-Wrestling as a spin-off of the popular singles tournament, the G1 Climax. It was created in 1991 as the Super Grade Tag League, as a continuation of a regular tag team tournament held since 1980 known various as the MSG (Note: Madison Square Garden) Tag League, IWGP Tag Title League, or Japan Cup Tag League. It gained the name G1 Tag League (G1タッグリーグ, G1 taggurīgu) in 1999. In 2012, NJPW's new owners, the Bushiroad company, renamed the tournament to its current form. Since the tournament acquired its current name, the winning team earns the right to challenge for the IWGP Tag Team Championship, assuming the team does not hold the title at the time of their victory.

G1 Tag League trophy

The World Tag League is held under a points system, with 2 points for a win, 1 for a time limit draw, and 0 for a loss, no contest or double decision. The current format, introduced in 2014, is essentially identical to that of the G1 Climax, with the top-scoring team from two blocks of eight advancing to the final.

== List of winners ==
Tournament	Year	Winners (total won as an individual)	Total won as a team	Reference
Asia Tag Team League	1976	Seiji Sakaguchi and Strong Kobayashi	-	
MSG Tag League	1980	Antonio Inoki and Bob Backlund	1	
MSG Tag League	1981	André the Giant and René Goulet	1	
MSG Tag League	1982	Antonio Inoki (2) and Hulk Hogan	1	
MSG Tag League	1983	Antonio Inoki (3) and Hulk Hogan (2)	2	
MSG Tag League	1984	Antonio Inoki (4) and Tatsumi Fujinami	1	
IWGP Tag Title League	1985	Tatsumi Fujinami (2) and Kengo Kimura	1	
Japan Cup Tag League	1986	Antonio Inoki (5) and Yoshiaki Fujiwara	1	
IWGP Tag Team Title League	1987	Keiji Muto and Shiro Koshinaka	-	
Japan Cup Tag League	1987	Tatsumi Fujinami (3) and Kengo Kimura (2)	2	
Japan Cup Elimination Tag League	1988	Antonio Inoki, Kantaro Hoshino and Riki Choshu	-	
IWGP Tag Team Title Challenger Decision League	1989	Masa Saito and Shinya Hashimoto	-	
New Year Tag Tournament	1990	Masahiro Chono and Shiro Koshinaka	-	
New Year Tag Tournament	1991	Kengo Kimura and Osamu Kido	-	
Super Grade Tag League	1991	Tatsumi Fujinami (4) and Big Van Vader	1	
Super Grade Tag League	1992	Riki Choshu and Shinya Hashimoto	1	
Super Grade Tag League	1993	Hiroshi Hase and Keiji Muto	1	
Super Grade Tag League	1994	Hiroshi Hase and Keiji Muto	2	
Super Grade Tag League	1995	Cho-Ten (Masahiro Chono and Hiroyoshi Tenzan)	1	
Super Grade Tag League	1996	Shinya Hashimoto (2) and Scott Norton	1	
Super Grade Tag League	1997	nWo Japan (Masahiro Chono (2) and Keiji Muto (3))	1	
Super Grade Tag League	1998	nWo Japan (Satoshi Kojima and Keiji Muto (4))	1	
G1 Tag League	1999	Keiji Muto (5) and Scott Norton (2)	1	
G1 Tag League	2000	Takashi Iizuka and Yuji Nagata	1	
G1 Tag League	2001	Ten-Koji (Satoshi Kojima (2) and Hiroyoshi Tenzan (2))	1	
G1 Tag League	2003	Osamu Nishimura and Hiroyoshi Tenzan (3)	1	
President Hoshino 10 Million Yen Offer Tag Tournament	2004	Hiroyoshi Tenzan and Shinsuke Nakamura	-	
U-30 One Night Tag Tournament	2004	Hiroshi Tanahashi and Taiji Ishimori	-	
Samurai! TV Openweight Tag Team Tournament	2005	Yuji Nagata and Hirooki Goto	-	
G1 Tag League	2006	Masahiro Chono (3) and Shinsuke Nakamura	1	
G1 Tag League	2007	Giant Bernard and Travis Tomko	1	
G1 Tag League	2008	Ten-Koji (Satoshi Kojima (3) and Hiroyoshi Tenzan (4))	2	
G1 Tag League	2009	Bad Intentions (Karl Anderson and Giant Bernard (2))	1	
G1 Tag League	2010	Seigigun (Yuji Nagata (2) and Wataru Inoue)	1	
G1 Tag League	2011	Suzuki-gun (Lance Archer and Minoru Suzuki)	1	
World Tag League	2012	Sword & Guns (Hirooki Goto and Karl Anderson (2))	1	
World Tag League	2013	Bullet Club (Doc Gallows and Karl Anderson (3))	1	
World Tag League	2014	Meiyu Tag (Hirooki Goto (2) and Katsuyori Shibata	1	
World Tag League	2015	Great Bash Heel (Togi Makabe and Tomoaki Honma)	1	
World Tag League	2016	Great Bash Heel (Togi Makabe and Tomoaki Honma)	2	
World Tag League	2017	Los Ingobernables de Japon (Evil and Sanada)	1	
World Tag League	2018	Los Ingobernables de Japon (Evil and Sanada)	2	
World Tag League	2019	FinJuice (Juice Robinson and David Finlay)	1	
World Tag League	2020	G.O.D. (Tama Tonga and Tanga Loa)	1	
World Tag League	2021	Bishamon (Hirooki Goto (3) and Yoshi-Hashi)	1	
World Tag League	2022	Bishamon (Hirooki Goto (4) and Yoshi-Hashi (2))	2	
World Tag League	2023	Bishamon (Hirooki Goto (5) and Yoshi-Hashi (3))	3	
World Tag League	2024	Los Ingobernables de Japon (Tetsuya Naito and Hiromu Takahashi)	1	
World Tag League	2025	TMDK (Zack Sabre Jr. and Ryohei Oiwa)	1	

== Asia Tag League ==
Four years before the inauguration of their recognized Tag League lineage, NJPW held a tournament with the later-familiar round-robin format to crown the first Asia Tag Team Champions. It had a much smaller field than subsequent editions, featuring only 4 teams in the single block. The League began on July 22, with the final taking place on August 4.

The matches were contested under Best Two Out Of Three Falls rules, as was the style at the time. The final was a rematch between the top two scorers (who ultimately happened to have had their first match - the last block bout - on the previous day's event). Inoki & Kido and The Mongols had a second block match against one another for unknown reasons, although Inoki's team won both regardless (and would still have come third place had both wins counted to their standing).

Final standings
Seiji Sakaguchi and Strong Kobayashi	3 wins
Tiger Jeet Singh and Gama Singh	2 wins
Antonio Inoki and Osamu Kido	1 win
Bolo Mongol and Geeto Mongol	0 wins

Results	Sakaguchi Kobayashi	Singh Singh	Inoki Kido	Mongol Mongol
Sakaguchi Kobayashi	—	Sakaguchi; Kobayashi (19:33)	Sakaguchi; Kobayashi (?)	Sakaguchi; Kobayashi (21:39)
Singh Singh	Sakaguchi; Kobayashi (19:33)	—	Singh; Singh (12:17)	Singh; Singh (?)
Inoki Kido	Sakaguchi; Kobayashi (?)	Singh; Singh (12:17)	—	Inoki; Kido (?)
Mongol Mongol	Sakaguchi; Kobayashi (21:39)	Singh; Singh (?)	Inoki; Kido (?)	—

Final
1	Seiji Sakaguchi and Strong Kobayashi	Pin
2	Tiger Jeet Singh and Gama Singh	24:25

== 1980 ==
The 1980 MSG Tag League featured 9 teams in a single block and was held from November 21 to December 10, 1980.

Final standings
Antonio Inoki and Bob Backlund	34
Stan Hansen and Hulk Hogan	32
André the Giant and The Hangman	28
Tiger Jeet Singh and Umanosuke Ueda	24
Seiji Sakaguchi and Strong Kobayashi	20
Tatsumi Fujinami and Kengo Kimura	15
Willem Ruska and Bad News Allen	10
Kantaro Hoshino and Riki Choshu	9
Ox Baker and Johnny Powers	0

Results	Baker Powers	Hansen Hogan	Inoki Backlund	Hoshino Choshu	Ruska Allen	Singh Ueda	Sakaguchi Kobayashi	André Hangman	Fujinami Kimura
Baker Powers	—	Draw (30:00)	Inoki; Backlund (3:57)	Hoshino; Choshu (9:16)	Ruska; Allen (9:05)	Singh; Ueda (10:25)	Sakaguchi; Kobayashi (13:51)	Draw (30:00)	Fujinami; Kimura (13:03)
Hansen Hogan	Draw (30:00)	—	Double; Countout (16:58)	Hogan; Hansen (4:27)	Hogan; Hansen (8:05)	Hogan; Hansen^{DQ} (6:50)	Hogan; Hansen (9:50)	Double; Countout (12:55)	Hogan; Hansen (9:35)
Inoki Backlund	Inoki; Backlund (3:57)	Double; Countout (16:58)	—	Inoki; Backlund (10:05)	Inoki; Backlund (13:48)	Inoki; Backlund (11:31)	Inoki; Backlund (11:59)	Double; Countout (14:36)	Inoki; Backlund (15:45)
Hoshino Choshu	Hoshino; Choshu (9:16)	Hogan; Hansen (4:27)	Inoki; Backlund (10:05)	—	Ruska; Allen (13:01)	Hoshino; Choshu^{DQ} (6:08)	Sakaguchi; Kobayashi (13:14)	André; Hangman (7:16)	Fujinami; Kimura (12:17)
Ruska Allen	Ruska; Allen (9:05)	Hogan; Hansen (8:05)	Inoki; Backlund (13:48)	Ruska; Allen (13:01)	—	Draw (30:00)	Sakaguchi; Kobayashi (13:54)	André; Hangman (4:49)	Fujinami; Kimura (11:02)
Singh Ueda	Singh; Ueda (10:25)	Hogan; Hansen^{DQ} (6:50)	Inoki; Backlund (11:31)	Hoshino; Choshu^{DQ} (6:08)	Draw (30:00)	—	Singh; Ueda^{CO} (8:40)	Singh; Ueda (3:37)	Singh; Ueda (11:48)
Sakaguchi Kobayashi	Sakaguchi; Kobayashi (13:51)	Hogan; Hansen (9:50)	Inoki; Backlund (11:59)	Sakaguchi; Kobayashi (13:14)	Sakaguchi; Kobayashi (13:54)	Singh; Ueda^{CO} (8:40)	—	André; Hangman (7:09)	Sakaguchi; Kobayashi (14:09)
André Hangman	Draw (30:00)	Double; Countout (12:55)	Double; Countout (14:36)	André; Hangman (7:16)	André; Hangman (4:49)	Singh; Ueda (3:37)	André; Hangman (7:09)	—	André; Hangman (4:51)
Fujinami Kimura	Fujinami; Kimura (13:03)	Hogan; Hansen (9:35)	Inoki; Backlund (15:45)	Fujinami; Kimura (12:17)	Fujinami; Kimura (11:02)	Singh; Ueda (11:48)	Sakaguchi; Kobayashi (14:09)	André; Hangman (4:51)	—

Final
1	Antonio Inoki and Bob Backlund	Pin
2	Stan Hansen and Hulk Hogan	17:35

== 1981 ==
The 1981 MSG Tag League featured 10 teams in a single block and was held from November 19 to December 10, 1981. Due to a tie for second place, the two second-place teams faced each other in a semifinal to decide the finalists.

Final standings
Wrestlers	Score
André the Giant and Rene Goulet	10
Antonio Inoki and Tatsumi Fujinami	8
Stan Hansen and Dick Murdoch	8
Tiger Toguchi and Killer Khan	6
Seiji Sakaguchi and Kengo Kimura	6
Rusher Kimura and Animal Hamaguchi	2
Riki Choshu and Yoshiaki Yatsu	2
Bad News Allen and Pat Patterson	2
Samoans Afa and Sika	2
El Canek and Super Maquina	2

Note: "Draw" is used when the outcome is unknown.

Results	Afa Sika	Allen Patterson	Choshu Yatsu	El Canek Maquina	Hansen Murdoch	Inoki Fujinami	Sakaguchi Kengo	Rusher Hamaguchi	André Goulet	Toguchi Khan
Afa Sika	—	Allen; Patterson (9:10)	Choshu; Yatsu	Afa; Sika	Draw (30:00)	Draw (30:00)	Sakaguchi; Kengo (8:23)	Rusher; Hamaguchi	André; Goulet	Toguchi; Khan^{DQ} (8:51)
Allen Patterson	Allen; Patterson (9:10)	—	Double; Countout	Draw (30:00)	Double; Countout	Inoki; Fujinami (15:42)	Draw (30:00)	Double; Countout (10:21)	Draw (30:00)	Toguchi; Khan
Choshu Yatsu	Choshu; Yatsu	Double; Countout	—	Choshu; Yatsu (7:29)	Hansen; Murdoch (7:19)	Inoki; Fujinami (13:22)	Double; Countout (13:17)	Double; Countout (12:01)	André; Goulet	Toguchi; Khan^{DQ}
El Canek Maquina	Afa; Sika	Draw (30:00)	Choshu; Yatsu (7:29)	—	Hansen; Murdoch	Inoki; Fujinami (9:05)	Sakaguchi; Kengo (11:25)	Rusher; Hamaguchi (11:29)	André; Goulet	Toguchi; Khan (14:30)
Hansen Murdoch	Draw (30:00)	Double; Countout	Hansen; Murdoch (7:19)	Hansen; Murdoch	—	Hansen; Murdoch (10:37)	Hansen; Murdoch^{CO} (6:55)	Hansen; Murdoch	Double; Countout (8:11)	Hansen; Murdoch^{CO}
Inoki Fujinami	Draw (30:00)	Inoki; Fujinami (15:42)	Inoki; Fujinami (13:22)	Inoki; Fujinami (9:05)	Hansen; Murdoch (10:37)	—	Inoki; Fujinami (13:33)	Inoki; Fujinami (10:45)	Double; Countout (13:53)	Inoki; Fujinami (15:38)
Sakaguchi Kengo	Sakaguchi; Kengo (8:23)	Draw (30:00)	Double; Countout (13:17)	Sakaguchi; Kengo (11:25)	Hansen; Murdoch^{CO} (6:55)	Inoki; Fujinami (13:33)	—	Sakaguchi; Kengo^{CO} (12:54)	André; Goulet (7:52)	Toguchi; Khan (15:15)
Rusher Hamaguchi	Rusher; Hamaguchi	Double; Countout (10:21)	Double; Countout (12:01)	Rusher; Hamaguchi (11:29)	Hansen; Murdoch	Inoki; Fujinami (10:45)	Sakaguchi; Kengo^{CO} (12:54)	—	André; Goulet	Rusher; Hamaguchi^{DQ}
André Goulet	André; Goulet	Draw (30:00)	André; Goulet	André; Goulet	Double; Countout (8:11)	Double; Countout (13:53)	André; Goulet (7:52)	André; Goulet	—	André; Goulet (10:50)
Toguchi Khan	Toguchi; Khan^{DQ} (8:51)	Toguchi; Khan	Toguchi; Khan^{DQ}	Toguchi; Khan (14:30)	Hansen; Murdoch^{CO}	Inoki; Fujinami (15:38)	Toguchi; Khan (15:15)	Rusher; Hamaguchi^{DQ}	André; Goulet (10:50)	—

Semifinal			Final
			1	André the Giant and Rene Goulet	Pin
2	Antonio Inoki and Tatsumi Fujinami	DCO	2	Antonio Inoki and Tatsumi Fujinami	8:05
3	Stan Hansen and Dick Murdoch	12:47

== 1982 ==
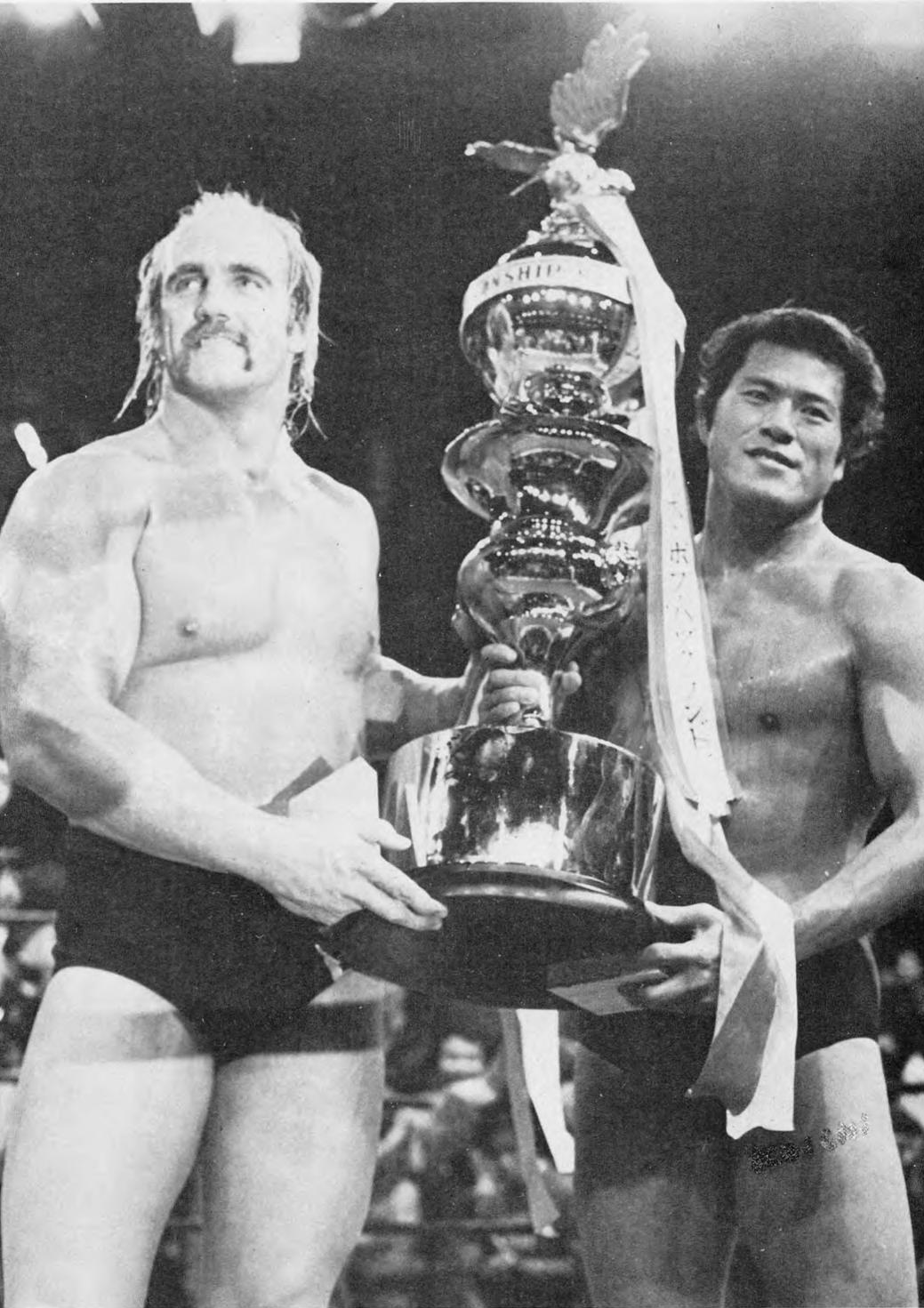
Hulk Hogan and Antonio Inoki display their trophy after winning the 1982 tournament

The 1982 MSG Tag League featured 8 teams in a single block and was held from November 19 to December 10, 1982. "Young Simpson" may be a mistranslation; no data has been found other than being tag team partner of British wrestler Wayne Bridges.

Final standings
Wrestlers	Score
Antonio Inoki and Hulk Hogan	28
Killer Khan and Tiger Toguchi	23
Seiji Sakaguchi and Tatsumi Fujinami	22
Dick Murdoch and Masked Superstar	21
André the Giant and Rene Goulet	20
Adrian Adonis and Dino Bravo	9
El Canek and Perro Aguayo	4
Wayne Bridges and Young Samson (Withdrawn) †	0

Results	Adonis Bravo	André Goulet	Inoki Hogan	Canek Aguayo	Murdoch Superstar	Khan Toguchi	Sakaguchi Fujinami	Bridges Samson
Adonis Bravo	—	André; Goulet	Inoki; Hogan	Adonis; Bravo	Murdoch; Superstar	Khan; Toguchi (7:06)	Adonis; Bravo (11:05)	Adonis; Bravo (forfeit)
André Goulet	André; Goulet	—	Hogan; Inoki	André; Goulet	André; Goulet	Khan; Toguchi	DCO (8:54)	André; Goulet (forfeit)
Inoki Hogan	Inoki; Hogan	Hogan; Inoki	—	Hogan; Inoki	Hogan; Inoki	Khan; Toguchi	Hogan; Inoki	Inoki; Hogan (forfeit)
Canek Aguayo	Adonis; Bravo	André; Goulet	Hogan; Inoki	—	Murdoch; Superstar	Khan; Toguchi	Sakiguchi; Fujinami (12:07)	Canek; Aguayo (forfeit)
Murdoch Superstar	Murdoch; Superstar	André; Goulet	Hogan; Inoki	Murdoch; Superstar	—	Murdoch; Superstar	DCO (12:11)	Murdoch; Superstar (forfeit)
Khan Toguchi	Khan; Toguchi (7:06)	Khan; Toguchi	Khan; Toguchi	Khan; Toguchi	Murdoch; Superstar	—	Sakiguchi; Fujinami (14:22)	Khan; Toguchi (forfeit)
Sakaguchi Fujinami	Adonis; Bravo (11:05)	DCO (8:54)	Hogan; Inoki	Sakiguchi; Fujinami (12:07)	DCO (12:11)	Sakiguchi; Fujinami (14:22)	—	Sakaguchi; Fujinami (forfeit)
Bridges Samson	Adonis; Bravo (forfeit)	André; Goulet (forfeit)	Inoki; Hogan (forfeit)	Canek; Aguayo (forfeit)	Murdoch; Superstar (forfeit)	Khan; Toguchi (forfeit)	Sakaguchi; Fujinami (forfeit)	—

Final
1	Killer Khan and Tiger Toguchi	Sub
2	Antonio Inoki and Hulk Hogan	31:47

† Bridges and Samson withdrew from the tournament and returned to the United Kingdom following the death of Bridges's father.

== 1983 ==
The 1983 MSG Tag League featured 9 teams in a single block and was held from November 18 to December 8, 1983.

Final standings
Wrestlers	Score
André the Giant and Swede Hanson †	32.0
Antonio Inoki and Hulk Hogan	28.5
Adrian Adonis and Dick Murdoch	27.5
Riki Choshu and Animal Hamaguchi	26.5
Tatsumi Fujinami and Akira Maeda	24.0
Killer Khan and Tiger Toguchi	16.5
Seiji Sakaguchi and Kengo Kimura	14.0
Bobby Duncum and Curt Hennig	5.0
Wayne Bridges and Otto Wanz	5.0

Results	Adonis Murdoch	André Hanson	Bridges Wanz	Choshu Hamaguchi	Duncum Hennig	Inoki Hogan	Khan Toguchi	Sakaguchi Kimura	Fujinami Maeda
Adonis Murdoch	—	DCO (12:13)	Adonis; Murdoch (11:01)	Choshu; Hamaguchi (17:52)	Adonis; Murdoch (11:33)	Adonis; Murdoch (9:28)	Adonis; Murdoch (9:53)	Adonis; Murdoch (12:08)	Fujinami; Maeda (15:19)
André Hanson	DCO (12:13)	—	Bridges; Wanz (forfeit)	André; Hanson (8:25)	André; Hanson (4:54)	DCO (10:03)	André; Hanson (7:22)	André; Hanson (11:51)	André; Hanson (10:27)
Bridges Wanz	Adonis; Murdoch (11:01)	Bridges; Wanz (forfeit)	—	Choshu; Hamaguchi (8:53)	Duncum; Hennig (12:47)	Inoki; Hogan (6:18)	Khan; Toguchi (9:45)	Sakaguchi; Kimura (12:24)	Fujinami; Maeda (10:58)
Choshu Hamaguchi	Choshu; Hamaguchi (17:52)	André; Hanson (8:25)	Choshu; Hamaguchi (8:53)	—	Choshu; Hamaguchi (9:32)	Inoki; Hogan (9:49)	Choshu; Hamaguchi (forfeit)	Choshu; Hamaguchi (13:07)	Draw (30:00)
Duncum Hennig	Adonis; Murdoch (11:33)	André; Hanson (4:54)	Duncum; Hennig (12:47)	Choshu; Hamaguchi (9:32)	—	Inoki; Hogan (9:27)	Khan; Toguchi (14:27)	Sakaguchi; Kimura (13:26)	Fujinami; Maeda (10:53)
Inoki Hogan	Adonis; Murdoch (9:28)	DCO (10:03)	Inoki; Hogan (6:18)	Inoki; Hogan (9:49)	Inoki; Hogan (9:27)	—	Khan; Toguchi (8:27)	Inoki; Hogan (8:21)	Inoki; Hogan (12:58)
Khan Toguchi	Adonis; Murdoch (9:53)	André; Hanson (7:22)	Khan; Toguchi (9:45)	Choshu; Hamaguchi (forfeit)	Khan; Toguchi (14:27)	Khan; Toguchi (8:27)	—	Sakaguchi; Kimura (8:36)	DCO (16:57)
Sakaguchi Kimura	Adonis; Murdoch (12:08)	André; Hanson (11:51)	Sakaguchi; Kimura (12:24)	Choshu; Hamaguchi (13:07)	Sakaguchi; Kimura (13:26)	Inoki; Hogan (8:21)	Sakaguchi; Kimura (8:36)	—	Fujinami; Maeda (13:22)
Fujinami Maeda	Fujinami; Maeda (15:19)	André; Hanson (10:27)	Fujinami; Maeda (10:58)	Draw (30:00)	Fujinami; Maeda (10:53)	Inoki; Hogan (12:58)	DCO (16:57)	Fujinami; Maeda (13:22)	—

Final
1	Antonio Inoki and Hulk Hogan	Pin
2	Adrian Adonis and Dick Murdoch	11:10

† Hanson was injured and could not compete in the final.

== 1984 ==
The 1984 MSG Tag League featured 7 teams in a single block and was held from November 16 to December 5, 1984.

Final standings
Wrestlers	Score
Adrian Adonis and Dick Murdoch	23
Antonio Inoki and Tatsumi Fujinami	22.5
André the Giant and Gerry Morrow	21.5
Seiji Sakaguchi and Kengo Kimura	13
Tiger Toguchi and Kerry Brown	8
Strong Machine #1 and Strong Machine #2	8
Hulk Hogan and The Wild Samoan †	0

Results	Adonis Murdoch	André Morrow	Inoki Fujinami	Hogan Samoan	Machine #1 Machine #2	Toguchi Brown	Sakaguchi Kimura
Adonis Murdoch	—N/a	DCO (11:08)	Draw (30:00)	Adonis; Murdoch (forfeit)	Adonis; Murdoch (12:13)	Adonis; Murdoch (19:12)	Adonis; Murdoch (14:34)
André Morrow	DCO (11:08)	—N/a	André; Morrow (10:34)	André; Morrow (forfeit)	Machine #1; Machine #2 (7:13)	André; Morrow (7:52)	André; Morrow (7:07)
Inoki Fujinami	Draw (30:00)	André; Morrow (10:34)	—N/a	Inoki; Fujinami (9:18)	Inoki; Fujinami (11:07)	Inoki; Fujinami (12:04)	Inoki; Fujinami (16:00)
Hogan Samoan	Adonis; Murdoch (forfeit)	André; Morrow (forfeit)	Inoki; Fujinami (9:18)	—N/a	Machine #1; Machine #2 (forfeit)	Toguchi; Brown (forfeit)	Sakaguchi; Kimura (forfeit)
Machine #1 Machine #2	Adonis; Murdoch (12:13)	Machine #1; Machine #2 (7:13)	Inoki; Fujinami (11:07)	Machine #1; Machine #2 (forfeit)	—N/a	Toguchi; Brown (10:51)	Sakiguchi; Kimura (11:09)
Toguchi Brown	Adonis; Murdoch (19:12)	André; Morrow (7:52)	Inoki; Fujinami (12:04)	Toguchi; Brown (forfeit)	Toguchi; Brown (10:51)	—N/a	Sakiguchi; Kimura (14:09)
Sakaguchi Kimura	Adonis; Murdoch (14:34)	André; Morrow (7:07)	Inoki; Fujinami (16:00)	Sakaguchi; Kimura (forfeit)	Sakiguchi; Kimura (11:09)	Sakiguchi; Kimura (14:09)	—N/a

Final
1	Antonio Inoki and Tatsumi Fujinami	Pin
2	Adrian Adonis and Dick Murdoch	33:31

† Hogan was "injured" after their first match and returned to the United States, forfeiting the rest of his and The Wild Samoan's tournament matches.

== 1985 ==
The 1985 IWGP Tag Title League featured 8 teams in a single block to determine the inaugural IWGP Tag Team Champions, and was held from November 15 to December 12, 1985.

Final standings
Wrestlers	Score
Bruiser Brody and Jimmy Snuka †	29
Tatsumi Fujinami and Kengo Kimura	23
Antonio Inoki and Seiji Sakaguchi	21
Dick Murdoch and Masked Superstar	19
Nord the Barbarian and Hacksaw Higgins	19
El Canek and Dos Caras	9
Mr. Pogo and Kendo Nagasaki	7
Mike Kelly and Pat Kelly	0

Results	Brody Snuka	Canek Caras	Fujinami Kimura	Inoki Sakaguchi	Murdoch Superstar	Nord Higgins	M. Kelly P. Kelly	Pogo Nagasaki
Brody Snuka	—N/a	Brody; Snuka (10:39)	Fujinami; Kimura (12:08)	Brody; Snuka (8:29)	Brody; Snuka (14:48)	Brody; Snuka (7:40)	Brody; Snuka (11:38)	Brody; Snuka (10:35)
Canek Caras	Brody; Snuka (10:39)	—N/a	Fujinami; Kimura (13:21)	Inoki; Sakaguchi (5:57)	Murdoch; Superstar (11:40)	DCO (12:06)	Canek; Caras (11:48)	DCO (10:38)
Fujinami Kimura	Fujinami; Kimura (12:08)	Fujinami; Kimura (13:21)	—N/a	Draw (30:00)	DCO (18:31)	Nord; Higgins (11:31)	Fujinami; Kimura (6:43)	Fujinami; Kimura (N/A)
Inoki Sakaguchi	Brody; Snuka (8:29)	Inoki; Sakaguchi (5:57)	Draw (30:00)	—N/a	Inoki; Sakaguchi (10:23)	Inoki; Sakaguchi (10:08)	Inoki; Sakaguchi (5:05)	Inoki; Sakaguchi (9:46)
Murdoch Superstar	Brody; Snuka (14:48)	Murdoch; Superstar (11:40)	DCO (18:31)	Inoki; Sakaguchi (10:23)	—N/a	DCO (8:29)	Murdoch; Superstar (7:26)	Murdoch; Superstar (14:31)
Nord Higgins	Brody; Snuka (7:40)	DCO (12:06)	Nord; Higgins (11:31)	Inoki; Sakaguchi (10:08)	DCO (8:29)	—N/a	Nord; Higgins (N/A)	Nord; Higgins (13:11)
M. Kelly P. Kelly	Brody; Snuka (11:38)	Canek; Caras (11:48)	Fujinami; Kimura (6:43)	Inoki; Sakaguchi (5:05)	Murdoch; Superstar (7:26)	Nord; Higgins (N/A)	—	Pogo; Nagasaki (12:25)
Pogo Nagasaki	Brody; Snuka (10:35)	DCO (10:38)	Fujinami; Kimura (N/A)	Inoki; Sakaguchi (9:46)	Nord; Higgins (13:11)	Pogo; Nagasaki (12:25)	Murdoch; Superstar (14:31)	—

Final
1	Antonio Inoki and Seiji Sakaguchi	Pin
2	Tatsumi Fujinami and Kengo Kimura	32:00

† Brody and Snuka no-showed the finals and jumped to All Japan Pro Wrestling

== 1986 ==
The 1986 Japan Cup Tag League featured 8 teams in a single block and was held from November 14, 1986, to December 11, 1986. Tatsumi Fujinami and Kengo Kimura were the reigning IWGP Tag Team Champions during this edition, but had fallen out with one another straight after winning the belts, so competed with different partners. The winning team of Antonio Inoki and Yoshiaki Fujiwara never received a match for the titles (likely due to the tenuous situation with the champions), although Fujiwara would win the titles with a different partner - Kazuo Yamazaki - the following year.

Final standings
Wrestlers	Score
Antonio Inoki and Yoshiaki Fujiwara	25
Osamu Kido and Akira Maeda	24
Dick Murdoch and Masked Superstar	24
Nobuhiko Takada and Shiro Koshinaka	21
Keiji Muto and Tatsumi Fujinami	19
Kengo Kimura and George Takano	14
Mr. Pogo and Kendo Nagasaki	5
The Tonga Kid and The Wild Samoan	0

Results	Inoki Fujiwara	Murdoch Superstar	Muto Fujinami	Kimura Takano	Pogo Nagasaki	Takada Koshinaka	Kido Maeda	Kid Samoan
Inoki Fujiwara	—N/a	Inoki; Fujiwara (10:32)	Inoki; Fujiwara (14:25)	Inoki; Fujiwara (13:08)	Inoki; Fujiwara (12:19)	Takada; Koshinaka (9:02)	Kido; Maeda (17:33)	Inoki; Fujiwara (11:21)
Murdoch Superstar	Inoki; Fujiwara (10:32)	—N/a	Murdoch; Superstar (9:16)	Murdoch; Superstar (11:05)	Murdoch; Superstar (8:18)	Murdoch; Superstar (2:35)	Kido; Maeda (10:46)	Murdoch; Superstar (9:12)
Muto Fujinami	Inoki; Fujiwara (14:25)	Murdoch; Superstar (9:16)	—N/a	Muto; Fujinami (20:38)	Muto; Fujinami (11:32)	Takada; Koshinaka (19:43)	Muto; Fujinami (16:54)	Muto; Fujinami (11:46)
Kimura Takano	Inoki; Fujiwara (13:08)	Murdoch; Superstar (11:05)	Muto; Fujinami (20:38)	—N/a	Kimura; Takano (14:32)	Takada; Koshinaka (13:05)	Kimura; Takano (11:24)	Kimura; Takano (forfeit)
Pogo Nagasaki	Inoki; Fujiwara (12:19)	Murdoch; Superstar (8:18)	Muto; Fujinami (11:32)	Kimura; Takano (14:32)	—N/a	Takada; Koshinaka (14:25)	Kido; Maeda (9:18)	Pogo; Nagasaki (10:49)
Takada Koshinaka	Takada; Koshinaka (9:02)	Murdoch; Superstar (2:35)	Takada; Koshinaka (19:43)	Takada; Koshinaka (13:05)	Takada; Koshinaka (14:25)	—N/a	Kido; Maeda (22:52)	Takada; Koshinaka (forfeit)
Kido Maeda	Kido; Maeda (17:33)	Kido; Maeda (10:46)	Muto; Fujinami (16:54)	Kimura; Takano (11:24)	Kido; Maeda (9:18)	Kido; Maeda (22:52)	—N/a	Kido; Maeda (11:19)
Kid Samoan	Inoki; Fujiwara (11:21)	Murdoch; Superstar (9:12)	Muto; Fujinami (11:46)	Kimura; Takano (forfeit)	Pogo; Nagasaki (10:49)	Takada; Koshinaka (forfeit)	Kido; Maeda (11:19)	—N/a

Semifinal			Final
			1	Antonio Inoki and Yoshiaki Fujiwara	Pin
2	Osamu Kido and Akira Maeda	Pin	2	Osamu Kido and Akira Maeda	12:32
3	Dick Murdoch and Masked Superstar	14:43

== Vacant Title League ==
Between the 1986 and 1987 editions of the annual Tag League, the tension between reigning champions Tatsumi Fujinami and Kengo Kimura escalated into an all-out feud against one another, necessitating that the IWGP Tag Team Championship be vacated. The titles were officially held up on February 5, with a round-robin tournament featuring seven teams held to crown new champions from February 24 to March 20, 1987. The final block match happened to be between the two top-scoring teams, so was treated as the tournament final overall.

Final standings
Wrestlers	Score
Keiji Muto and Shiro Koshinaka	18+
Akira Maeda and Nobuhiko Takada	17
George Takano and Tatsumi Fujinami	16
Osamu Kido and Yoshiaki Fujiwara	14
Rick Steiner and Steve Williams	14
Kendo Nagasaki and Mr. Pogo	13
Butch Miller and Luke Williams	4

Results	Muto Koshinaka	Maeda Takada	Takano Fujinami	Kido Fujiwara	Steiner Williams	Nagasaki Pogo	Miller Williams
Muto Koshinaka	—N/a	Muto; Koshinaka (17:04)	Takano; Fujinami (14:21)	Muto; Koshinaka^{CO} (10:41)	DCO (10:26)	Muto; Koshinaka (10:59)	Muto; Koshinaka (11:17)
Maeda Takada	Muto; Koshinaka (17:04)	—N/a	Takano; Fujinami^{DQ} (13:15)	Kido; Fujiwara (14:38)	Maeda; Takada (11:51)	Maeda; Takada (10:19)	Maeda; Takada (8:34)
Takano Fujinami	Takano; Fujinami (14:21)	Takano; Fujinami^{DQ} (13:15)	—N/a	Kido; Fujiwara^{DQ} (12:00)	DCO (11:16)	Takano; Fujinami (13:01)	Miller; Williams^{DQ} (9:21)
Kido Fujiwara	Muto; Koshinaka^{CO} (10:41)	Kido; Fujiwara (14:38)	Kido; Fujiwara^{DQ} (12:00)	—N/a	Steiner; Williams (7:39)	Nagasaki; Pogo^{DQ} (11:06)	Kido; Fujiwara (10:36)
Steiner Williams	DCO (10:26)	Maeda; Takada (11:51)	DCO (11:16)	Steiner; Williams (7:39)	—N/a	Nagasaki; Pogo^{DQ?} (7:35)	Steiner; Williams (7:04)
Nagasaki Pogo	Muto; Koshinaka (10:59)	Maeda; Takada (10:19)	Takano; Fujinami (13:01)	Nagasaki; Pogo^{DQ} (11:06)	Nagasaki; Pogo^{DQ?} (7:35)	—N/a	Nagasaki; Pogo (7:36)
Miller Williams	Muto; Koshinaka (11:17)	Maeda; Takada (8:34)	Miller; Williams^{DQ} (9:21)	Kido; Fujiwara (10:36)	Steiner; Williams (7:04)	Nagasaki; Pogo (7:36)	—N/a

== 1987 ==
The 1987 Japan Cup Tag League featured 8 teams in a single block and was held from November 9, 1987, to December 7, 1987. The reunited team of Tatsumi Fujinami and Kengo Kimura won their second League together, and defeated Kazuo Yamazaki and Yoshiaki Fujiwara for the titles on January 18, 1988.

Final standings
Wrestlers	Score
Antonio Inoki and Dick Murdoch	29
Tatsumi Fujinami and Kengo Kimura	26
Masa Saito and Riki Choshu/Yoshiaki Fujiwara †	26
Seiji Sakaguchi and Scott Hall	17
Keiji Muto and Nobuhiko Takada	13
Akira Maeda and Super Strong Machine †	10
Kendo Nagasaki and Mr. Pogo	9
Ron Starr and Ron Ritchie	0

Results	Inoki Murdoch	Fujinami Kimura	Saito Choshu/Fujiwara	Sakaguchi Hall	Muto Takada	Maeda Machine	Nagasaki Pogo	Starr Ritchie
Inoki Murdoch	—N/a	DCO (12:18)	Draw (30:00)	Inoki; Murdoch (10:09)	Inoki; Murdoch (11:25)	Inoki; Murdoch (14:12)	Inoki; Murdoch (14:58)	Inoki; Murdoch (10:06)
Fujinami Kimura	DCO (12:18)	—N/a	Fujinami; Kimura (13:01)	Fujinami; Kimura (10:11)	Muto; Takada (18:08)	Fujinami; Kimura (forfeit)	Fujinami; Kimura (12:01)	Fujinami; Kimura (6:58)
Saito Choshu/Fujiwara	Draw (30:00)	Fujinami; Kimura (13:01)	—N/a	Saito; Fujiwara (10:10)	Saito; Fujiwara (13:17)	Saito; Fujiwara (forfeit)	Saito; Fujiwara (9:21)	Saito; Fujiwara (12:04)
Sakaguchi Hall	Inoki; Murdoch (10:09)	Fujinami; Kimura (10:11)	Saito; Fujiwara (10:10)	—N/a	Sakaguchi; Hall (13:17)	Sakaguchi; Hall (forfeit)	Sakaguchi; Hall (8:11)	Sakaguchi; Hall (7:51)
Muto Takada	Inoki; Murdoch (11:25)	Muto; Takada (18:08)	Saito; Fujiwara (13:17)	Sakaguchi; Hall (13:17)	—N/a	Maeda; Machine (12:40)	Muto; Takada (10:20)	Muto; Takada (10:22)
Maeda Machine	Inoki; Murdoch (14:12)	Fujinami; Kimura (forfeit)	Saito; Fujiwara (forfeit)	Sakaguchi; Hall (forfeit)	Maeda; Machine (12:40)	—N/a	Nagasaki; Pogo (forfeit)	Maeda; Machine (10:58)
Nagasaki Pogo	Inoki; Murdoch (14:58)	Fujinami; Kimura (12:01)	Saito; Fujiwara (9:21)	Sakaguchi; Hall (8:11)	Muto; Takada (10:20)	Nagasaki; Pogo (forfeit)	—N/a	Nagasaki; Pogo (10:18)
Starr Ritchie	Inoki; Murdoch (10:06)	Fujinami; Kimura (6:58)	Saito; Fujiwara (12:04)	Sakaguchi; Hall (7:51)	Muto; Takada (10:22)	Maeda; Machine (10:58)	Nagasaki; Pogo (10:18)	—N/a

Semifinal		Final
		1	Antonio Inoki and Dick Murdoch
2	Tatsumi Fujinami and Kengo Kimura	2	Tatsumi Fujinami and Kengo Kimura
3	Masa Saito and Yoshiaki Fujiwara

† On the eighth night of the tournament, during a six-man tag team match, Maeda stiff kicked Choshu in the face, breaking his orbital bone and sidelining him for a month. Choshu would be replaced by Fujiwara in the tournament while Maeda was suspended, forfeiting the rest of his and Super Strong Machine's tournament matches.

== Six-Man Tag League ==
Whilst an officially-recognized continuation of the annual Tag League would not occur for 4 years, At least one tag team tournament per year would still be held by NJPW in the interim. The 1988 edition from November 11 to December 7 retained the familiar League formula, but - uniquely - extended the matches themselves to three competitors per team. A concept that would not be revisited for a New Japan tournament until the early 2000s. Furthermore, the matches were wrestled under elimination rules, requiring all three members of a team be individually defeated before a match would end and the winner be awarded points.

Buzz Sawyer seemingly suffered an injury on December 3, causing his team to forfeit their remaining three block matches. However, as this caused a four-way tie for first place, the one team to have beaten Sawyer's before their withdrawal was given a bye to an ultimate final, whilst the other three engaged in "playoffs" for the right to challenge them.

Final standings
Wrestlers	Score
Masahiro Chono, Shinya Hashimoto and Tatsumi Fujinami	6 wins
Antonio Inoki, Riki Choshu and Kantaro Hoshino	6 wins^{*}
Bob Orton, Dick Murdoch and Scott Hall	6 wins^{*}
Masa Saito, Seiji Sakaguchi and Tatsutoshi Goto	6 wins^{*}
Kengo Kimura, Osamu Kido and Yoshiaki Fujiwara	5 wins
Buzz Sawyer, Kendo Nagasaki and Manny Fernandez	3 wins
Steve Armstrong, Tracy Smothers and George Takano	3 wins
Hiro Saito, Kuniaki Kobayashi and Shiro Koshinaka	1 win
Super Strong Machine, The Jaguar and The Tiger	0 wins

Results	Inoki Choshu Hoshino	Orton Murdoch Hall	Chono Hashimoto Fujinami	Saito Sakaguchi Goto	Sawyer Nagasaki Fernandez	Kimura Kido Fujiwara	Saito Kobayashi Koshinaka	Armstrong Smothers Takano	Machine Jaguar Tiger
Inoki Choshu Hoshino	—N/a	Orton; Murdoch; Hall (24:06)^{3:2}	Inoki; Choshu; Hoshino (14:35)^{3:}^{1}	Saito; Sakaguchi; Goto (18:22)^{3:2}	Inoki; Choshu; Hoshino (forfeit)	Inoki; Choshu; Hoshino (15:56)^{3:}^{1}	Inoki; Choshu; Hoshino (13:56)^{3:2}	Inoki; Choshu; Hoshino (10:59)^{3:}^{1}	Inoki; Choshu; Hoshino (9:27)^{3:}^{1}
Orton Murdoch Hall	Orton; Murdoch; Hall (24:06)^{3:2}	—N/a	Chono; Hashimoto; Fujinami (17:07)^{3:}^{2}	Saito; Sakaguchi; Goto (21:59)^{3:2}	Orton; Murdoch; Hall (forfeit)	Orton; Murdoch; Hall (15:48)^{3:2}	Orton; Murdoch; Hall (18:55)^{3:}^{1}	Orton; Murdoch; Hall (29:38)^{3:2}	Orton; Murdoch; Hall (18:18)^{3:}^{0}
Chono Hashimoto Fujinami	Inoki; Choshu; Hoshino (14:35)^{3:}^{1}	Chono; Hashimoto; Fujinami (17:07)^{3:}^{2}	—N/a	Chono; Hashimoto; Fujinami (14:33)^{3:}^{2}	Chono; Hashimoto; Fujinami (14:31)^{3:}^{2}	Kimura; Kido; Fujiwara (13:25)^{3:}^{2}	Chono; Hashimoto; Fujinami (15:09)^{3:}^{2}	Chono; Hashimoto; Fujinami (18:06)^{3:}^{0}	Chono; Hashimoto; Fujinami (10:53)^{3:}^{0}
Saito Sakaguchi Goto	Saito; Sakaguchi; Goto (18:22)^{3:2}	Saito; Sakaguchi; Goto (21:59)^{3:2}	Chono; Hashimoto; Fujinami (14:33)^{3:}^{2}	—N/a	Saito; Sakaguchi; Goto (forfeit)	Kimura; Kido; Fujiwara (13:02)^{3:}^{2}	Saito; Sakaguchi; Goto (15:46)^{3:2}	Saito; Sakaguchi; Goto (11:49)^{3:2}	Saito; Sakaguchi; Goto (11:39)^{3:2}
Sawyer Nagasaki Fernandez	Inoki; Choshu; Hoshino (forfeit)	Orton; Murdoch; Hall (forfeit)	Chono; Hashimoto; Fujinami (14:31)^{3:}^{2}	Saito; Sakaguchi; Goto (forfeit)	—N/a	Kimura; Kido; Fujiwara (13:50)^{3:}^{2}	Sawyer; Nagasaki; Fernandez (12:01)^{3:}^{2}	Sawyer; Nagasaki; Fernandez (17:09)^{3:}^{2}	Sawyer; Nagasaki; Fernandez (13:01)^{3:}^{1}
Kimura Kido Fujiwara	Inoki; Choshu; Hoshino (15:56)^{3:}^{1}	Orton; Murdoch; Hall (15:48)^{3:2}	Kimura; Kido; Fujiwara (13:25)^{3:}^{2}	Kimura; Kido; Fujiwara (13:02)^{3:}^{2}	Kimura; Kido; Fujiwara (13:50)^{3:}^{2}	—N/a	Kimura; Kido; Fujiwara (14:23)^{3:}^{2}	Armstrong; Smothers; Takano (13:57)^{3:}^{2}	Kimura; Kido; Fujiwara (15:38)^{3:}^{0}
Saito Kobayashi Koshinaka	Inoki; Choshu; Hoshino (13:56)^{3:2}	Orton; Murdoch; Hall (18:55)^{3:}^{1}	Chono; Hashimoto; Fujinami (15:09)^{3:}^{2}	Saito; Sakaguchi; Goto (15:46)^{3:2}	Sawyer; Nagasaki; Fernandez (12:01)^{3:}^{2}	Kimura; Kido; Fujiwara (14:23)^{3:}^{2}	—N/a	Armstrong; Smothers; Takano (?)^{3:}^{2}	Saito; Kobayashi; Koshinaka (15:27)^{3:}^{1}
Armstrong Smothers Takano	Inoki; Choshu; Hoshino (10:59)^{3:}^{1}	Orton; Murdoch; Hall (29:38)^{3:2}	Chono; Hashimoto; Fujinami (18:06)^{3:}^{0}	Saito; Sakaguchi; Goto (11:49)^{3:2}	Sawyer; Nagasaki; Fernandez (17:09)^{3:}^{2}	Armstrong; Smothers; Takano (13:57)^{3:}^{2}	Armstrong; Smothers; Takano (?)^{3:}^{2}	—N/a	Armstrong; Smothers; Takano (17:54)^{3:}^{2}
Machine Jaguar Tiger	Inoki; Choshu; Hoshino (9:27)^{3:}^{1}	Orton; Murdoch; Hall (18:18)^{3:}^{0}	Chono; Hashimoto; Fujinami (10:53)^{3:}^{0}	Saito; Sakaguchi; Goto (11:39)^{3:2}	Sawyer; Nagasaki; Fernandez (13:01)^{3:}^{1}	Kimura; Kido; Fujiwara (15:38)^{3:}^{0}	Saito; Kobayashi; Koshinaka (15:27)^{3:}^{1}	Armstrong; Smothers; Takano (17:54)^{3:}^{2}	—N/a

Playoff
3	Bob Orton, Dick Murdoch and Scott Hall	3:2
4	Masa Saito, Seiji Sakaguchi and Tatsutoshi Goto	14:48

Playoff
2	Antonio Inoki, Riki Choshu and Kantaro Hoshino	3:1
3	Bob Orton, Dick Murdoch and Scott Hall	14:06

Final
1	Masahiro Chono, Shinya Hashimoto and Tatsumi Fujinami	3:2
2	Antonio Inoki, Riki Choshu and Kantaro Hoshino	14:54

== #1 Contender's League ==
Despite still not being marketed as a "Tag League", 1989 saw a functionally identical round-robin tournament as the focus of the NJPW Bloody Fight Series 1989 tour, which took place from August 25 to September 15. The winners of the seven-team block would receive an opportunity at the IWGP Tag Team Championship. Said winning team of Masa Saito & Shinya Hashimoto would go on to defeat the reigning champions Riki Choshu & Takayuki Iizuka for the belts five days after their tournament victory, on September 20.

The team of Akira Nogami & Tatsumi Fujinami were forced to withdraw from the entire tournament and forfeit all of their matches due to an injury Fujinami sustained in June. He would not fully heal & return to in-ring competition until the following year's September.

Final standings
Wrestlers	Score
Masa Saito and Shinya Hashimoto	25
Salman Hashimikov and Victor Zangiev	25
Kengo Kimura and Osamu Kido	20
Kuniaki Kobayashi and Shiro Koshinaka	15
George Takano and Super Strong Machine	15
Owen Hart and Pat Tanaka	5
Akira Nogami and Tatsumi Fujinami	0

Results	Saito Hashimoto	Nogami Fujinami	Takano Machine	Kimura Kido	Kobayashi Koshinaka	Hart Tanaka	Hashimikov Zangiev
Saito Hashimoto	—N/a	Saito; Hashimoto (forfeit)	Takano; Machine (?)	Saito; Hashimoto (16:53)	Saito; Hashimoto (10:29)	Saito; Hashimoto (9:49)	Saito; Hashimoto (16:21)
Nogami Fujinami	Saito; Hashimoto (forfeit)	—N/a	Takano; Machine (forfeit)	Kimura; Kido (forfeit)	Kobayashi; Koshinaka (forfeit)	Hart; Tanaka (forfeit)	Hashimikov; Zangiev (forfeit)
Takano Machine	Takano; Machine (?)	Takano; Machine (forfeit)	—N/a	Kimura; Kido (15:17)	Kobayashi; Koshinaka (?)	Takano; Machine (?)	Hashimikov; Zangiev (10:11)
Kimura Kido	Saito; Hashimoto (16:53)	Kimura; Kido (forfeit)	Kimura; Kido (15:17)	—N/a	Kimura; Kido (11:19)	Kimura; Kido (?)	Hashimikov; Zangiev (12:14)
Kobayashi Koshinaka	Saito; Hashimoto (10:29)	Kobayashi; Koshinaka (forfeit)	Kobayashi; Koshinaka (?)	Kimura; Kido (11:19)	—N/a	Kobayashi; Koshinaka (11:49)	Hashimikov; Zangiev (8:33)
Hart Tanaka	Saito; Hashimoto (9:49)	Hart; Tanaka (forfeit)	Takano; Machine (?)	Kimura; Kido (?)	Kobayashi; Koshinaka (11:49)	—N/a	Hashimikov; Zangiev (12:33)
Hashimikov Zangiev	Saito; Hashimoto (16:21)	Hashimikov; Zangiev (forfeit)	Hashimikov; Zangiev (10:11)	Hashimikov; Zangiev (12:14)	Hashimikov; Zangiev (8:33)	Hashimikov; Zangiev (12:33)	—N/a

Final
1	Masa Saito and Shinya Hashimoto	Pin
2	Salman Hashimikov and Victor Zangiev	11:13

== New Year's Tournament ==
In both 1990 and 1991, the first NJPW show of the year featured a small single-elimination tag team tournament, encapsulated within either one or two days. The 1990 edition was entirely held on January 5, whilst 1991's started on January 4 (one year before that would be cemented as the date of NJPW's annual flagship event).

1990

Round 1
Kengo Kimura and Osamu Matsuda
Hiroshi Dairi and Osamu Kido	13:17
Masahiro Chono and Shiro Koshinaka
Hirokazu Hata and Riki Choshu	11:16
Black Cat and Masa Saito
Akira Katayama and Shinya Hashimoto	8:34
Naoki Sano and Super Strong Machine
Akira Nogami and George Takano	11:50

Semifinals
Kengo Kimura and Osamu Matsuda
Masahiro Chono and Shiro Koshinaka	11:36
Black Cat and Masa Saito
Naoki Sano and Super Strong Machine	7:41

Final
Masahiro Chono and Shiro Koshinaka
Naoki Sano and Super Strong Machine	11:21

The winners did not receive an IWGP tag title shot, possibly due to the unorthodox heavyweight-plus-junior nature of the tournaments pairings. However, Chono would go on to dethrone the reigning champions Masa Saito & Shinya Hashimoto alongside his & Shinya's mutual Dojo-mate, Keiji Muto.

1991

Round 1
Kengo Kimura and Osamu Kido
Norio Honaga and Tatsutoshi Goto	12:30
Hiro Saito and Super Strong Machine
Jushin Thunder Liger and Shiro Koshinaka	12:19

Semifinals
Kengo Kimura and Osamu Kido
Animal Hamaguchi and Hiroshi Hase	12:30
Keiji Muto and Masahiro Chono
Hiro Saito and Super Strong Machine	14:16

Final
Kengo Kimura and Osamu Kido
Keiji Muto and Masahiro Chono	15:46

Kimura & Kido received a title shot against champions Saito and Strong Machine on January 16, which they lost.

== 1991 ==
The 1991 Super Grade Tag League featured 7 teams in a single block and was held from October 5 to October 17. Due to a tie for second place, the two second-place teams faced each other in a semifinal to decide the finalists. Winners Tatsumi Fujinami and Big Van Vader did not receive a title shot, with Hiroshi Hase and Keiji Muto instead being the first challengers to The Steiner Brothers' tag titles after the tournament (and winning). Vader did however become tag champion on March 1, 1992, albeit with 3rd-place finisher Crusher Bam Bam Bigelow.

Final standings
Wrestlers	Score
Riki Choshu and Masa Saito	10
Tatsumi Fujinami and Big Van Vader	8
Crusher Bam Bam Bigelow and Masahiro Chono	8
Hiroshi Hase and Keiji Muto	6
Shinya Hashimoto and Scott Norton	6
The Great Kokina and The Wild Samoan	2
Kim Duk and Tiger Jeet Singh	2

Results	Choshu Saito	Fujinami Vader	Bigelow Chono	Hase Muto	Hashimoto Norton	Kokina Samoan	Duk Singh
Choshu Saito	—N/a	Choshu; Saito (13:55)	Choshu; Saito (16:02)	Choshu; Saito (17:19)	Choshu; Saito (10:18)	Choshu; Saito (7:55)	Duk; Singh (10:25)
Fujinami Vader	Choshu; Saito (13:55)	—N/a	Fujinami; Vader (12:08)	Fujinami; Vader (14:23)	Hashimoto; Norton (14:03)	Fujinami; Vader (11:26)	Fujinami; Vader (4:00)
Bigelow Chono	Choshu; Saito (16:02)	Fujinami; Vader (12:08)	—N/a	Bigelow; Chono (16:13)	Bigelow; Chono (12:09)	Bigelow; Chono (9:29)	Bigelow; Chono (10:45)
Hase Muto	Choshu; Saito (17:19)	Fujinami; Vader (14:23)	Bigelow; Chono (16:13)	—N/a	Hase; Muto (14:39)	Hase; Muto (11:20)	Hase; Muto (7:39)
Hashimoto Norton	Choshu; Saito (10:18)	Hashimoto; Norton (14:03)	Bigelow; Chono (12:09)	Hase; Muto (14:39)	—N/a	Hashimoto; Norton (11:06)	Hashimoto; Norton (8:44)
Kokina Samoan	Choshu; Saito (7:55)	Fujinami; Vader (11:26)	Bigelow; Chono (9:29)	Hase; Muto (11:20)	Hashimoto; Norton (11:06)	—N/a	Kokina; Samoan (6:43)
Duk Singh	Duk; Singh (10:25)	Fujinami; Vader (4:00)	Bigelow; Chono (10:45)	Hase; Muto (7:39)	Hashimoto; Norton (8:44)	Kokina; Samoan (6:43)	—N/a

Semifinal			Final
			1	Riki Choshu and Masa Saito	13:35
2	Tatsumi Fujinami and Big Van Vader	Pin	2	Tatsumi Fujinami and Big Van Vader	Pin
3	Crusher Bam Bam Bigelow and Masahiro Chono	17:04

== 1992 ==
The 1992 Super Grade Tag League, featuring 7 teams, was held from October 8 to October 21. Once again, the winners did not receive a title opportunity, with the next challengers instead being Scott Norton & Tony Halme.

Final standings
Wrestlers	Score
Riki Choshu and Shinya Hashimoto	9
Hiroshi Hase and Kensuke Sasaki	9
Crusher Bam Bam Bigelow and Keiji Muto	8
Masahiro Chono and Tony Halme	8
Scott Norton and Super Strong Machine	6
Tatsumi Fujinami and Manabu Nakanishi	2
Jim Neidhart and The Z-Man	0

Results	Choshu Hashimoto	Hase Sasaki	Bigelow Muto	Chono Halme	Norton Machine	Fujinami Nakanishi	Neidhart Z-Man
Choshu Hashimoto	—N/a	Draw (30:00)	Choshu; Hashimoto (N/A)	Chono; Halme (14:17)	Choshu; Hashimoto (11:00)	Choshu; Hashimoto (N/A)	Choshu; Hashimoto (8:09)
Hase Sasaki	Draw (30:00)	—N/a	Hase; Sasaki (N/A)	Chono; Halme (14:21)	Hase; Sasaki (11:07)	Hase; Sasaki (15:19)	Hase; Sasaki (14:14)
Bigelow Muto	Choshu; Hashimoto (N/A)	Hase; Sasaki (N/A)	—N/a	Bigelow; Muto (14:03)	Bigelow; Muto (11:35)	Bigelow; Muto (12:35)	Bigelow; Muto (11:05)
Chono Halme	Chono; Halme (14:17)	Chono; Halme (14:21)	Bigelow; Muto (14:03)	—N/a	Norton; Machine (9:43)	Chono; Halme (12:13)	Chono; Halme (8:13)
Norton Machine	Chono; Halme (11:00)	Hase; Sasaki (11:07)	Bigelow; Muto (11:35)	Norton; Machine (9:43)	—N/a	Norton; Machine (7:33)	Norton; Machine (11:13)
Fujinami Nakanishi	Choshu; Hashimoto (N/A)	Hase; Sasaki (15:19)	Bigelow; Muto (12:35)	Chono; Halme (12:13)	Norton; Machine (7:33)	—N/a	Fujinami; Nakanishi (6:45)
Neidhart Z-Man	Chono; Halme (8:09)	Hase; Sasaki (14:14)	Bigelow; Muto (11:05)	Chono; Halme (8:13)	Norton; Machine (11:13)	Fujinami; Nakanishi (6:45)	—N/a

Semifinals
1	Riki Choshu and Shinya Hashimoto	Pin
4	Manabu Nakanishi and Tatsumi Fujinami	11:54
2	Hiroshi Hase and Kensuke Sasaki	Pin
3	Crusher Bam Bam Bigelow and Keiji Muto	15:54

Final
1	Riki Choshu and Shinya Hashimoto	Pin
2	Hiroshi Hase and Kensuke Sasaki	15:45

== 1993 ==
The 1993 Super Grade Tag League, featuring 10 teams, was held from October 8 to November 4. Reigining champions Hercules Hernandez and Scott Norton had retained against Hiroshi Hase and Keiji Muto shortly before the tournament, which they avenged by defeating the champions in-turn in the final.

Final standings
Wrestlers	Score
Hercules Hernandez and Scott Norton	14
Hiroshi Hase and Keiji Muto	14
Masahiro Chono and Shinya Hashimoto	13
Tatsumi Fujinami and Osamu Kido	13
Hawk Warrior and Power Warrior	10
Shiro Koshinaka and Michiyoshi Ohara	8
Takayuki Iizuka and Akira Nogami	6
The Barbarian and Masa Saito	4
Jushin Thunder Liger and Wild Pegasus	4
Brad Armstrong and Sean Royal	0

Results	Hernandez Norton	Hase Muto	Chono Hashimoto	Fujinami Kido	Hawk Power	Koshinaka Ohara	Iizuka Nogami	Barbarian Saito	Liger Pegasus	Armstrong Royal
Hernandez Norton	—	Hernandez; Norton (14:58)	Chono; Hashimoto (18:07)	Fujinami; Kido (9:16)	Hernandez; Norton (forfeit)	Hernandez; Norton (10:46)	Hernandez; Norton (6:50)	Hernandez; Norton (8:58)	Hernandez; Norton (10:50)	Hernandez; Norton (forfeit)
Hase Muto	Hernandez; Norton (14:58)	—	Hase; Muto (26:50)	Hase; Muto (17:00)	Hase; Muto (8:34)	Koshinaka; Ohara (18:30)	Hase; Muto (16:36)	Hase; Muto (13:47)	Hase; Muto (25:28)	Hase; Muto (20:11)
Chono Hashimoto	Chono; Hashimoto (18:07)	Hase; Muto (26:50)	—	Draw (30:00)	Chono; Hashimoto (14:00)	Chono; Hashimoto (forfeit)	Chono; Hashimoto (16:39)	Chono; Hashimoto (14:33)	Liger; Pegasus (17:22)	Chono; Hashimoto (forfeit)
Fujinami Kido	Fujinami; Kido (9:16)	Hase; Muto (17:00)	Draw (30:00)	—	Fujinami; Kido (forfeit)	Koshinaka; Ohara (14:10)	Fujinami; Kido (14:15)	Fujinami; Kido (forfeit)	Fujinami; Kido (7:48)	Fujinami; Kido (forfeit)
Hawk Power	Hernandez; Norton (forfeit)	Hase; Muto (8:34)	Chono; Hashimoto (14:00)	Fujinami; Kido (forfeit)	—	Hawk; Power (7:46)	Hawk; Power (4:43)	Hawk; Power (6:04)	Hawk; Power (5:13)	Hawk; Power (forfeit)
Koshinaka Ohara	Hernandez; Norton (10:46)	Koshinaka; Ohara (18:30)	Chono; Hashimoto (forfeit)	Koshinaka; Ohara (14:10)	Hawk; Power (7:46)	—	Koshinaka; Ohara (15:04)	Koshinaka; Ohara (forfeit)	Koshinaka; Ohara (13:59)	Koshinaka; Ohara (forfeit)
Iizuka Nogami	Hernandez; Norton (6:50)	Hase; Muto (16:36)	Chono; Hashimoto (16:39)	Fujinami; Kido (14:15)	Hawk; Power (4:43)	Koshinaka; Ohara (15:04)	—	Iizuka; Nogami (12:40)	Iizuka; Nogami (20:26)	Iizuka; Nogami (forfeit)
Barbarian Saito	Hernandez; Norton (8:58)	Hase; Muto (13:47)	Chono; Hashimoto (14:33)	Fujinami; Kido (forfeit)	Hawk; Power (6:04)	Koshinaka; Ohara (forfeit)	Iizuka; Nogami (12:40)	—	Barbarian; Saito (14:12)	Barbarian; Saito (forfeit)
Liger Pegasus	Hernandez; Norton (10:50)	Hase; Muto (25:28)	Liger; Pegasus (17:22)	Fujinami; Kido (7:48)	Hawk; Power (5:13)	Koshinaka; Ohara (13:59)	Iizuka; Nogami (20:26)	Barbarian; Saito (14:12)	—	Liger; Pegasus (forfeit)
Armstrong Royal	Hernandez; Norton (forfeit)	Hase; Muto (20:11)	Chono; Hashimoto (forfeit)	Fujinami; Kido (forfeit)	Hawk; Power (forfeit)	Koshinaka; Ohara (forfeit)	Iizuka; Nogami (forfeit)	Barbarian; Saito (forfeit)	Liger; Pegasus (forfeit)	—

Final
1	Hercules Hernandez and Scott Norton	Pin
2	Hiroshi Hase and Keiji Muto	13:46

== 1994 ==
The 1994 Super Grade Tag League, featuring 10 teams, was held from October 19 to October 30. Hiroshi Hase and Keiji Muto won for the second straight year (the first team to do so since Inoki & Hogan), and won the titles on November 25 from The Hellraisers.

Final standings
Wrestlers	Score
Masahiro Chono and Super Strong Machine	14
Hiroshi Hase and Keiji Muto	14
Hawk Warrior and Power Warrior	12
Tatsumi Fujinami and Yoshiaki Fujiwara	10
Osamu Kido and Scott Norton	10
Shinya Hashimoto and Manabu Nakanishi	8
Takayuki Iizuka and Akira Nogami	6
Riki Choshu and Yoshiaki Yatsu	6
Mike Enos and Steven Regal	6
Nailz and Ron Simmons	4

Results	Chono Machine	Hase Muto	Hawk Power	Fujinami Fujiwara	Kido Norton	Hashimoto Nakanishi	Iizuka Nogami	Choshu Yatsu	Enos Regal	Nailz Simmons
Chono Machine	—	Chono; Machine (14:43)	Chono; Machine (13:40)	Chono; Machine (12:47)	Chono; Machine (9:58)	Chono; Machine (9:04)	Iizuka; Nogami (8:12)	Choshu; Yatsu (11:35)	Chono; Machine (9:18)	Chono; Machine (8:29)
Hase Muto	Chono; Machine (14:43)	—	Hase; Muto (17:25)	Hase; Muto (17:14)	Hase; Muto (11:31)	Hase; Muto (17:19)	Iizuka; Nogami (20:47)	Hase; Muto (forfeit)	Hase; Muto (13:39)	Hase; Muto (13:39)
Hawk Power	Chono; Machine (13:40)	Hase; Muto (17:25)	—	Hawk; Power (8:50)	Kido; Norton (5:59)	Hawk; Power (11:41)	Hawk; Power (10:59)	Hawk; Power (9:17)	Hawk; Power (6:58)	Hawk; Power (4:06)
Fujinami Fujiwara	Chono; Machine (12:47)	Hase; Muto (17:14)	Hawk; Power (8:50)	—	Kido; Norton (10:04)	Fujinami; Fujiwara (13:26)	Fujinami; Fujiwara (8:43)	Fujinami; Fujiwara (forfeit)	Fujinami; Fujiwara (N/A)	Fujinami; Fujiwara (9:44)
Kido Norton	Chono; Machine (9:58)	Hase; Muto (11:31)	Kido; Norton (5:59)	Kido; Norton (10:04)	—	Hashimoto; Nakanishi (12:02)	Iizuka; Nogami (11:02)	Kido; Norton (forfeit)	Kido; Norton (19:55)	Kido; Norton (8:03)
Hashimoto Nakanishi	Chono; Machine (9:04)	Hase; Muto (17:19)	Hawk; Power (11:41)	Fujinami; Fujiwara (13:26)	Hashimoto; Nakanishi (12:02)	—	Hashimoto; Nakanishi (16:43)	Hashimoto; Nakanishi (forfeit) †	Enos; Regal (12:51)	Hashimoto; Nakanishi (9:39)
Iizuka Nogami	Iizuka; Nogami (8:12)	Iizuka; Nogami (20:47)	Hawk; Power (10:59)	Fujinami; Fujiwara (8:43)	Iizuka; Nogami (11:02)	Hashimoto; Nakanishi (16:43)	—	Choshu; Yatsu (10:44)	Enos; Regal (11:41)	Nailz; Simmons (6:23)
Choshu Yatsu	Choshu; Yatsu (11:35)	Hase; Muto (forfeit)	Hawk; Power (9:17)	Fujinami; Fujiwara (forfeit)	Kido; Norton (forfeit)	Hashimoto; Nakanishi (forfeit) †	Choshu; Yatsu (10:44)	—	Choshu; Yatsu (10:30)	Nailz; Simmons (forfeit)
Enos Regal	Chono; Machine (9:18)	Hase; Muto (13:39)	Hawk; Power (6:58)	Fujinami; Fujiwara (N/A)	Kido; Norton (19:55)	Enos; Regal (12:51)	Enos; Regal (11:41)	Choshu; Yatsu (10:30)	—	Enos; Regal (9:42)
Nailz Simmons	Chono; Machine (8:29)	Hase; Muto (13:39)	Hawk; Power (4:06)	Fujinami; Fujiwara (9:44)	Kido; Norton (8:03)	Hashimoto; Nakanishi (9:39)	Nailz; Simmons (6:23)	Nailz; Simmons (forfeit)	Enos; Regal (9:42)	—

Semifinal			Final
			1	Hiroshi Hase and Keiji Muto	Pin
2	Masahiro Chono and Super Strong Machine	Pin	2	Masahiro Chono and Super Strong Machine	26:01
3	Hawk Warrior and Power Warrior	13:40

† Yatsu teamed Tadao Yasuda, who filled in for Choshu, for their match against Hashimoto and Nakanishi.

== 1995 ==
The 1995 Super Grade Tag League, featuring 7 teams, was held from October 15 to October 30. Due to a tie for second place, the two second-place teams faced each other in a semifinal to decide the finalists. Masa Saito also replaced Riki Choshu in his team with Kensuke Sasaki after one match. Winning team Cho-Ten (Masahiro Chono and Hiroyoshi Tenzan) had unsuccessfully challenged champion team Shinya Hashimoto and Junji Hirata shortly before the tournament, and did so again on December 11.

Final standings
Wrestlers	Score
Osamu Kido and Kazuo Yamazaki	8
Masahiro Chono and Hiroyoshi Tenzan	7
Shinya Hashimoto and Junji Hirata	7
Tatsutoshi Goto and Shiro Koshinaka	6
Keiji Muto and Osamu Nishimura	6
Takashi Iizuka and Akira Nogami	4
Riki Choshu/Masa Saito and Kensuke Sasaki	4

Results	Kido Yamazaki	Chono Tenzan	Hashimoto Hirata	Goto Koshinaka	Muto Nishimura	Iizuka Nogami	Choshu/Saito Sasaki
Kido Yamazaki	—N/a	Kido; Yamazaki (8:51)	Hashimoto; Hirata (8:34)	Koshinaka; Goto (12:37)	Kido; Yamazaki (13:17)	Kido; Yamazaki (10:27)	Kido; Yamazaki (12:37)
Chono Tenzan	Kido; Yamazaki (8:51)	—N/a	Draw (30:00)	Chono; Tenzan (13:47)	Chono; Tenzan (12:23)	Chono; Tenzan (11:33)	Saito; Sasaki (12:08)
Hashimoto Hirata	Hashimoto; Hirata (8:34)	Draw (30:00)	—N/a	Hashimoto; Hirata (15:10)	Muto; Nishimura (14:47)	Iizuka; Nogami (9:36)	Hashimoto; Hirata (13:04)
Goto Koshinaka	Koshinaka; Goto (12:37)	Chono; Tenzan (13:47)	Hashimoto; Hirata (15:10)	—N/a	Koshinaka; Goto (17:55)	Koshinaka; Goto (15:46)	Choshu; Sasaki (8:25)
Muto Nishimura	Kido; Yamazaki (13:17)	Chono; Tenzan (12:23)	Muto; Nishimura (14:47)	Koshinaka; Goto (17:55)	—N/a	Muto; Nishimura (16:31)	Muto; Nishimura (17:44)
Iizuka Nogami	Kido; Yamazaki (10:27)	Chono; Tenzan (11:33)	Iizuka; Nogami (9:36)	Koshinaka; Goto (15:46)	Muto; Nishimura (16:31)	—N/a	Iizuka; Nogami (12:56)
Choshu/Saito Sasaki	Kido; Yamazaki (12:37)	Saito; Sasaki (12:08)	Hashimoto; Hirata (13:04)	Choshu; Sasaki (8:25)	Muto; Nishimura (17:44)	Iizuka; Nogami (12:56)	—N/a

Semifinal			Final
			1	Osamu Kido and Kazuo Yamazaki	Sub
2	Masahiro Chono and Hiroyoshi Tenzan	Pin	2	Masahiro Chono and Hiroyoshi Tenzan	12:50
3	Shinya Hashimoto and Junji Hirata	14:45

== 1996 ==
The 1996 Super Grade Tag League, featuring 8 teams, was held from October 13 to November 1. It altered the traditional points system, rewarding just 1 point for a victory, and 0 for a draw or loss. The winning team did not receive a title match, although Takashi Iizuka and Kazuo Yamazaki did for pinning the champions.

Final standings
Wrestlers	Score
Keiji Muto and Rick Steiner	5
Shinya Hashimoto and Scott Norton	5
Takashi Iizuka and Kazuo Yamazaki	4
Riki Choshu and Kensuke Sasaki	4
Masahiro Chono and Hiroyoshi Tenzan	3
Satoshi Kojima and Manabu Nakanishi	3
Tatsumi Fujinami and Shiro Koshinaka	2
Steven Regal and David Taylor	1

Results	Chono Tenzan	Choshu Sasaki	Fujinami Koshinaka	Hashimoto Norton	Iizuka Yamazaki	Kojima Nakanishi	Muto Steiner	Regal Taylor
Chono Tenzan	—	Chono; Tenzan (12:52)	Fujinami; Koshinaka (11:56)	Hashimoto; Norton (15:01)	Iizuka; Yamazaki (14:22)	Chono; Tenzan (10:40)	Muto; Steiner (8:20)	Chono; Tenzan (forfeit)
Choshu Sasaki	Chono; Tenzan (12:52)	—	Choshu; Sasaki (forfeit)	Choshu; Sasaki (9:40)	Draw (30:00)	Choshu; Sasaki (12:32)	Muto; Steiner (11:24)	Choshu; Sasaki (forfeit)
Fujinami Koshinaka	Fujinami; Koshinaka (11:56)	Choshu; Sasaki (forfeit)	—	Hashimoto; Norton (13:06)	Iizuka; Yamazaki (forfeit)	Kojima; Nakanishi (forfeit)	Fujinami; Koshinaka (8:15)	Regal; Taylor (10:29)
Hashimoto Norton	Hashimoto; Norton (15:01)	Choshu; Sasaki (9:40)	Hashimoto; Norton (13:06)	—	Hashimoto; Norton (13:04)	Hashimoto; Norton (15:03)	Muto; Steiner (13:56)	Hashimoto; Norton (forfeit)
Iizuka Yamazaki	Iizuka; Yamazaki (14:22)	Draw (30:00)	Iizuka; Yamazaki (forfeit)	Hashimoto; Norton (13:04)	—	Kojima; Nakanishi (11:20)	Iizuka; Yamazaki (11:58)	Iizuka; Yamazaki (forfeit)
Kojima Nakanishi	Chono; Tenzan (10:40)	Choshu; Sasaki (12:32)	Kojima; Nakanishi (forfeit)	Hashimoto; Norton (15:03)	Kojima; Nakanishi (11:20)	—	Muto; Steiner (16:28)	Kojima; Nakanishi (12:11)
Muto Steiner	Muto; Steiner (8:20)	Muto; Steiner (11:24)	Fujinami; Koshinaka (8:15)	Muto; Steiner (13:56)	Iizuka; Yamazaki (11:58)	Muto; Steiner (16:28)	—	Muto; Steiner (12:13)
Regal Taylor	Chono; Tenzan (forfeit)	Choshu; Sasaki (forfeit)	Regal; Taylor (10:29)	Hashimoto; Norton (forfeit)	Iizuka; Yamazaki (forfeit)	Kojima; Nakanishi (12:11)	Muto; Steiner (12:13)	—

Final
1	Keiji Muto and Rick Steiner	Pin
2	Shinya Hashimoto and Scott Norton	21:54

== 1997 ==
The 1997 Super Grade Tag League, featuring 8 teams, was held from November 18 to December 8. It used the same points system as the previous year, awarding 1 point for a win and 0 for a loss or draw. Due to a tie for second place, the two second-place teams faced each other in a semifinal to decide the finalists. Reigning champions Masahiro Chono and Keiji Muto (then- part of nWo Japan) won the tournament, and did not defend the belts again until February 1998.

Final standings
Wrestlers	Score
Masahiro Chono and Keiji Muto	6
Shinya Hashimoto and Manabu Nakanishi	5
Kensuke Sasaki and Kazuo Yamazaki	5
Tatsumi Fujinami and Kengo Kimura	4
nWo Sting and Hiroyoshi Tenzan	3
Satoshi Kojima and Tadao Yasuda	2
Kenny Kaos and Rob Rage	2
Tatsutoshi Goto and Michiyoshi Ohara	1

Results	Chono Muto	Fujinami Kimura	Goto Ohara	Hashimoto Nakanishi	Kaos Rage	Kojima Yasuda	Sting Tenzan	Sasaki Yamazaki
Chono Muto	—	Chono; Muto (13:46)	Chono; Muto (6:59)	Chono; Muto (18:05)	Chono; Muto (13:21)	Chono; Muto (13:45)	Chono; Muto (11:29)	Sasaki; Yamazaki (24:21)
Fujinami Kimura	Chono; Muto (13:46)	—	Goto; Ohara (8:54)	Hashimoto; Nakanishi (12:27)	Fujinami; Kimura (8:26)	Fujinami; Kimura (12:35)	Fujinami; Kimura (9:48)	Fujinami; Kimura (14:10)
Goto Ohara	Chono; Muto (6:59)	Goto; Ohara (8:54)	—	Hashimoto; Nakanishi (11:41)	Kaos; Rage (9:23)	Kojima; Yasuda (10:12)	Sting; Tenzan (11:10)	Sasaki; Yamazaki (12:51)
Hashimoto Nakanishi	Chono; Muto (18:05)	Hashimoto; Nakanishi (12:27)	Hashimoto; Nakanishi (11:41)	—	Hashimoto; Nakanishi (13:34)	Kojima; Yasuda (14:51)	Hashimoto; Nakanishi (13:45)	Hashimoto; Nakanishi (18:53)
Kaos Rage	Chono; Muto (13:21)	Fujinami; Kimura (8:26)	Kaos; Rage (9:23)	Hashimoto; Nakanishi (13:34)	—	Kaos; Rage (10:40)	Sting; Tenzan (9:17)	Sasaki; Yamazaki (9:25)
Kojima Yasuda	Chono; Muto (13:45)	Fujinami; Kimura (12:35)	Kojima; Yasuda (10:12)	Kojima; Yasuda (14:51)	Kaos; Rage (10:40)	—	Sting; Tenzan (12:02)	Sasaki; Yamazaki (12:54)
Sting Tenzan	Chono; Muto (11:29)	Fujinami; Kimura (9:48)	Sting; Tenzan (11:10)	Hashimoto; Nakanishi (13:45)	Sting; Tenzan (9:17)	Sting; Tenzan (12:02)	—	Sasaki; Yamazaki (11:34)
Sasaki Yamazaki	Sasaki; Yamazaki (24:21)	Fujinami; Kimura (14:10)	Sasaki; Yamazaki (12:51)	Hashimoto; Nakanishi (18:53)	Sasaki; Yamazaki (9:25)	Sasaki; Yamazaki (12:54)	Sasaki; Yamazaki (11:34)	—

Semifinal			Final
			1	Masahiro Chono and Keiji Muto	Sub
2	Shinya Hashimoto and Manabu Nakanishi	Sub	2	Shinya Hashimoto and Manabu Nakanishi	23:33
3	Kensuke Sasaki and Kazuo Yamazaki	15:24

== 1998 ==
The 1998 Super Grade Tag League, featuring 7 teams, was held from November 16 to December 6. It returned to the traditional points system, awarding 2 points for a victory, 1 for a draw, and 0 for a loss. Due to a four-way tie for first place, the four teams were paired in the semifinals, with the two winners facing off in the final. . The nWo Japan team of Satoshi Kojima and Keiji Muto won, which was parlayed into Kojima & fellow member Hiroyoshi Tenzan (successfully) challenging for the belts at the January 4th Tokyo Dome show due to Muto already being booked in its IWGP Heavyweight Championship main event.

Final standings
Wrestlers	Score
Satoshi Kojima and Keiji Muto	8
Tatsumi Fujinami and Shinya Hashimoto	8
Kensuke Sasaki and Kazuo Yamazaki	8
Shiro Koshinaka and Genichiro Tenryu	8
Yuji Nagata and Manabu Nakanishi	6
nWo Sting and Hiroyoshi Tenzan	4
David Finlay and Jerry Flynn	0

Results	Finlay Flynn	Fujinami Hashimoto	Kojima Muto	Koshinaka Tenryu	Nagata Nakanishi	Sting Tenzan	Sasaki Yamazaki
Finlay Flynn	—	Fujinami; Hashimoto (11:49)	Kojima; Muto (11:29)	Koshinaka; Tenryu (10:09)	Nagata; Nakanishi (12:57)	Sting; Tenzan (9:59)	Sasaki; Yamazaki (8:34)
Fujinami Hashimoto	Fujinami; Hashimoto (11:49)	—	Kojima; Muto (12:21)	Fujinami; Hashimoto (14:46)	Fujinami; Hashimoto (16:05)	Fujinami; Hashimoto (12:06)	Sasaki; Yamazaki (16:07)
Kojima Muto	Kojima; Muto (11:29)	Kojima; Muto (12:21)	—	Koshinaka; Tenryu (14:56)	Nagata; Nakanishi (15:15)	Kojima; Muto (19:35)	Kojima; Muto (17:42)
Koshinaka Tenryu	Koshinaka; Tenryu (10:09)	Fujinami; Hashimoto (14:46)	Koshinaka; Tenryu (14:56)	—	Koshinaka; Tenryu (15:10)	Koshinaka; Tenryu (12:18)	Sasaki; Yamazaki (13:38)
Nagata Nakanishi	Nagata; Nakanishi (12:57)	Fujinami; Hashimoto (16:05)	Nagata; Nakanishi (15:15)	Koshinaka; Tenryu (15:10)	—	Sting; Tenzan (13:24)	Sasaki; Yamazaki (19:14)
Sting Tenzan	Sting; Tenzan (9:59)	Fujinami; Hashimoto (12:06)	Kojima; Muto (19:35)	Koshinaka; Tenryu (12:18)	Sting; Tenzan (13:24)	—	Sasaki; Yamazaki (12:19)
Sasaki Yamazaki	Sasaki; Yamazaki (8:34)	Sasaki; Yamazaki (16:07)	Kojima; Muto (17:42)	Sasaki; Yamazaki (13:38)	Sasaki; Yamazaki (19:14)	Sasaki; Yamazaki (12:19)	—

Semifinals
1	Satoshi Kojima and Keiji Muto	Pin
4	Shiro Koshinaka and Genichiro Tenryu	13:21
2	Kensuke Sasaki and Kazuo Yamazaki	Sub
3	Tatsumi Fujinami and Shinya Hashimoto	17:45

Final
1	Satoshi Kojima and Keiji Muto	Pin
3	Tatsumi Fujinami and Shinya Hashimoto	18:51

== 1999 ==
The 1999 G1 Tag League, featuring 9 teams, was held from September 10 to September 23. Winning nWo Japan team Keiji Muto and Scott Norton seemingly gifted their title shot to fellow members once again, as Ten-Koji received (and failed at) a title match against their "Third Generation" Dojo-mates Yuji Nagata and Manabu Nakanishi on December 5.

Final standings
Wrestlers	Score
Keiji Muto and Scott Norton	14
Yuji Nagata and Manabu Nakanishi	10
Satoshi Kojima and Hiroyoshi Tenzan	10
Junji Hirata and Shiro Koshinaka	8
Shinya Hashimoto and Meng	8
Masahiro Chono and Don Frye	6
Tatsutoshi Goto and Michiyoshi Ohara	6
Takashi Iizuka and Brian Johnston	6
Kazuyuki Fujita and Kensuke Sasaki	4

Results	Chono Frye	Fujita Sasaki	Goto Ohara	Hashimoto Meng	Hirata Koshinaka	Iizuka Johnston	Kojima Tenzan	Muto Norton	Nagata Nakanishi
Chono Frye	—	Chono; Frye (10:53)	Goto; Ohara (11:54)	Chono; Frye (12:27)	Hirata; Koshinaka (Forfeit)	Chono; Frye (12:01)	Kojima; Tenzan (Forfeit)	Muto; Norton (Forfeit)	Nagata; Nakanishi (12:58)
Fujita Sasaki	Chono; Frye (10:53)	—	Fujita; Sasaki (10:18)	Hashimoto; Meng (8:45)	Hirata; Koshinaka (12:20)	Fujita; Sasaki (13:37)	Kojima; Tenzan (13:14)	Muto; Norton (11:00)	Nagata; Nakanishi (14:29)
Goto Ohara	Goto; Ohara (11:54)	Fujita; Sasaki (10:18)	—	Goto; Ohara (7:09)	Goto; Ohara (12:06)	Iizuka; Johnston (10:56)	Kojima; Tenzan (12:26)	Muto; Norton (8:16)	Nagata; Nakanishi (10:36)
Hashimoto Meng	Chono; Frye (12:27)	Hashimoto; Meng (8:45)	Goto; Ohara (7:09)	—	Hirata; Koshinaka (9:26)	Hashimoto; Meng (8:24)	Hashimoto; Meng (13:03)	Muto; Norton (17:38)	Hashimoto; Meng (11:48)
Hirata Koshinaka	Hirata; Koshinaka (Forfeit)	Hirata; Koshinaka (12:20)	Goto; Ohara (12:06)	Hirata; Koshinaka (9:26)	—	Iizuka; Johnston (9:50)	Kojima; Tenzan (13:14)	Muto; Norton (13:12)	Hirata; Koshinaka (13:52)
Iizuka Johnston	Chono; Frye (12:01)	Fujita; Sasaki (13:37)	Iizuka; Johnston (10:56)	Hashimoto; Meng (8:24)	Iizuka; Johnston (9:50)	—	Iizuka; Johnston (14:31)	Muto; Norton (12:35)	Nagata; Nakanishi (12:57)
Kojima Tenzan	Kojima; Tenzan (Forfeit)	Kojima; Tenzan (13:14)	Kojima; Tenzan (12:26)	Hashimoto; Meng (13:03)	Kojima; Tenzan (13:14)	Iizuka; Johnston (14:31)	—	Kojima; Tenzan (17:17)	Nagata; Nakanishi (19:02)
Muto Norton	Muto; Norton (Forfeit)	Muto; Norton (11:00)	Muto; Norton (8:16)	Muto; Norton (17:38)	Muto; Norton (13:12)	Muto; Norton (12:35)	Kojima; Tenzan (17:17)	—	Muto; Norton (15:31)
Nagata Nakanishi	Nagata; Nakanishi (12:58)	Nagata; Nakanishi (14:29)	Nagata; Nakanishi (10:36)	Hashimoto; Meng (11:48)	Hirata; Koshinaka (13:52)	Nagata; Nakanishi (12:57)	Nagata; Nakanishi (19:02)	Muto; Norton (15:31)	—

Semifinal			Final
			1	Keiji Muto and Scott Norton	Sub
2	Yuji Nagata and Manabu Nakanishi	Pin	2	Yuji Nagata and Manabu Nakanishi	21:32
3	Satoshi Kojima and Hiroyoshi Tenzan	13:42

== 2000 ==
The 2000 G1 Tag League, featuring 7 teams, was held from November 17 to November 30. It strayed slightly from the standard formula; as there was a four-way tie for first place, all four teams advanced to a small single-elimination tournament to decide the 2000 G1 Tag champions. The winners did not receive a title match.

Final standings
Wrestlers	Score
Takashi Iizuka and Yuji Nagata	8
Satoshi Kojima and Hiroyoshi Tenzan	8
Manabu Nakanishi and Yutaka Yoshie	8
Masahiro Chono and Scott Norton	8
Jyushin Thunder Liger and Super Strong Machine	4
Shiro Koshinaka and Kensuke Sasaki	4
T2000 Machine #1 and T2000 Machine #2	2

Results	Chono Norton	Iizuka Nagata	Kojima Tenzan	Koshinaka Sasaki	Liger Machine	Nakanishi Yoshie	T2000 #1 T2000 #2
Chono Norton	—	Chono; Norton (14:49)	Kojima; Tenzan (20:48)	Chono; Norton (13:41)	Chono; Norton (16:36)	Nakanishi; Yoshie (14:56)	Chono; Norton (10:06)
Iizuka Nagata	Chono; Norton (14:49)	—	Kojima; Tenzan (19:06)	Iizuka; Nagata (22:24)	Iizuka; Nagata (18:40)	Iizuka; Nagata (18:28)	Iizuka; Nagata (8:28)
Kojima Tenzan	Kojima; Tenzan (20:48)	Kojima; Tenzan (19:06)	—	Koshinaka; Sasaki (15:23)	Kojima; Tenzan (18:36)	Kojima; Tenzan (15:52)	T2000 #1; T2000 #2 (12:28)
Koshinaka Sasaki	Chono; Norton (13:41)	Iizuka; Nagata (22:24)	Koshinaka; Sasaki (15:23)	—	Liger; Machine (12:58)	Nakanishi; Yoshie (12:29)	Koshinaka; Sasaki (7:01)
Liger Machine	Chono; Norton (16:36)	Iizuka; Nagata (18:40)	Kojima; Tenzan (18:36)	Liger; Machine (12:58)	—	Nakanishi; Yoshie (12:29)	Liger; Machine (13:45)
Nakanishi Yoshie	Nakanishi; Yoshie (14:56)	Iizuka; Nagata (18:28)	Kojima; Tenzan (15:52)	Nakanishi; Yoshie (12:29)	Nakanishi; Yoshie (12:29)	—	Nakanishi; Yoshie (12:19)
T2000 #1 T2000 #2	Chono; Norton (10:06)	Iizuka; Nagata (8:28)	T2000 #1; T2000 #2 (12:28)	Koshinaka; Sasaki (7:01)	Liger; Machine (13:45)	Nakanishi; Yoshie (12:19)	—

Semifinals
1	Satoshi Kojima and Hiroyoshi Tenzan	Pin
3	Manabu Nakanishi and Yutaka Yoshie	15:58
2	Takayuki Iizuka and Yuji Nagata	Sub
4	Masahiro Chono and Scott Norton	12:06

Final
1	Satoshi Kojima and Hiroyoshi Tenzan	Pin
2	Takayuki Iizuka and Yuji Nagata	19:09

== 2001 ==
The 2001 G1 Tag League, featuring 8 teams, was held from November 30 to December 11. Ten-Koji (The team of NJPW Dojo classmates Satoshi Kojima and Hiroyoshi Tenzan) won, coming off of the end of a 430 day reign with the tag belts that had ended 3 months prior. However, Kojima jumped ship to All-Japan Pro Wrestling in January 2002 as part of a protest against the "Inokiism" trend (as did reigning tag champion Keiji Mutoh), scuppering any chance of a tag title shot.

Final standings
Wrestlers	Score
Mike Barton and Jim Steele	9
Satoshi Kojima and Hiroyoshi Tenzan	8
Yuji Nagata and Manabu Nakanishi	8
Dan Devine and Kensuke Sasaki	8
Scott Norton and Super J	7
Jushin Thunder Liger and Osamu Nishimura	6
Masahiro Chono and Giant Silva	6
Kenzo Suzuki and Hiroshi Tanahashi	4

Results	Barton Steele	Chono Silva	Devine Sasaki	Kojima Tenzan	Liger Nishimura	Nagata Nakanishi	Norton Super J	Suzuki Tanahashi
Barton Steele	—	Barton; Steele (11:44)	Devine; Sasaki (13:19)	Barton; Steele (17:33)	Barton; Steele (20:16)	Nagata; Nakanishi (18:44)	Draw (30:00)	Barton; Steele (16:50)
Chono Silva	Barton; Steele (11:44)	—	Chono; Silva (11:34)	Chono; Silva (12:54)	Liger; Nishimura (12:16)	Nagata; Nakanishi (12:00)	Norton; Super J (10:35)	Chono; Silva (12:49)
Devine Sasaki	Devine; Sasaki (13:19)	Chono; Silva (11:34)	—	Kojima; Tenzan (14:28)	Devine; Sasaki (2:36)	Devine; Sasaki (14:59)	Norton; Super J (10:31)	Devine; Sasaki (15:33)
Kojima Tenzan	Barton; Steele (17:33)	Chono; Silva (12:54)	Kojima; Tenzan (14:28)	—	Liger; Nishimura (25:57)	Kojima; Tenzan (18:11)	Kojima; Tenzan (15:32)	Kojima; Tenzan (13:04)
Liger Nishimura	Barton; Steele (20:16)	Liger; Nishimura (12:16)	Devine; Sasaki (2:36)	Liger; Nishimura (25:57)	—	Nagata; Nakanishi (15:42)	Liger; Nishimura (14:09)	Suzuki; Tanahashi (19:10)
Nagata Nakanishi	Nagata; Nakanishi (18:44)	Nagata; Nakanishi (12:00)	Devine; Sasaki (14:59)	Kojima; Tenzan (18:11)	Nagata; Nakanishi (14:52)	—	Norton; Super J (12:41)	Nagata; Nakanishi (15:48)
Norton Super J	Draw (30:00)	Norton; Super J (10:35)	Norton; Super J (10:31)	Kojima; Tenzan (15:32)	Liger; Nishimura (14:09)	Norton; Super J (12:41)	—	Suzuki; Tanahashi (6:51)
Suzuki Tanahashi	Barton; Steele (16:50)	Chono; Silva (12:49)	Devine; Sasaki (15:33)	Kojima; Tenzan (13:04)	Suzuki; Tanahashi (19:10)	Nagata; Nakanishi (15:48)	Suzuki; Tanahashi (6:51)	—

Semifinals Decision
3	Yuji Nagata and Manabu Nakanishi	Sub
4	Dan Devine and Kensuke Sasaki	14:40

Semifinals
N/A
N/A
2	Satoshi Kojima and Hiroyoshi Tenzan	Pin
3	Yuji Nagata and Manabu Nakanishi	17:25

Final
1	Mike Barton and Jim Steele	Pin
2	Satoshi Kojima and Hiroyoshi Tenzan	24:02

== 2003 ==
The 2003 G1 Tag League, featuring 8 teams, was held from October 15 to October 30. The match between Mike Barton and Jim Steele and Hiroshi Tanahashi and Yutaka Yoshie did not have the usual 30-minute time limit as it was also for Tanahashi and Yoshie's IWGP World Tag Team Championship, giving it a 60-minute time limit. Winners Osamu Nishimura and Hiroyoshi Tenzan received their title match on December 14 and were successful in dethroning champions Hiroshi Tanahashi and Yutaka Yoshie.

Final standings
Wrestlers	Score
Yoshihiro Takayama and TOA	10
Osamu Nishimura and Hiroyoshi Tenzan	9
Yuji Nagata and Manabu Nakanishi	9
Hiroshi Tanahashi and Yutaka Yoshie	7
Makai #1 and Tadao Yasuda	7
Mike Barton and Jim Steele	6
Blue Wolf and Shinsuke Nakamura	6
Masahiro Chono and Jushin Thunder Liger	2

Results	Barton Steele	Wolf Nakamura	Chono Liger	Makai #1 Yasuda	Nagata Nakanishi	Nishimura Tenzan	Takayama TOA	Tanahashi Yoshie
Barton Steele	—	Barton; Steele (13:46)	Chono; Liger (19:30)	Barton; Steele (9:58)	Nagata; Nakanishi (19:14)	Barton; Steele (19:09)	Takayama; TOA (13:11)	Tanahashi; Yoshie (30:58)
Wolf Nakamura	Barton; Steele (13:46)	—	Wolf; Nakamura (Forfeit)	Makai #1; Yasuda (Forfeit)	Nagata; Nakanishi (11:47)	Wolf; Nakamura (21:22)	Takayama; TOA (Forfeit)	Wolf; Nakamura (10:13)
Chono Liger	Chono; Liger (19:30)	Wolf; Nakamura (Forfeit)	—	Makai #1; Yasuda (12:59)	Nagata; Nakanishi (Forfeit)	Nishimura; Tenzan (Forfeit)	Takayama; TOA (Forfeit)	Tanahashi; Yoshie (Forfeit)
Makai #1 Yasuda	Barton; Steele (9:58)	Makai #1; Yasuda (Forfeit)	Makai #1; Yasuda (12:59)	—	Nagata; Nakanishi (12:38)	DCO (8:39)	Makai #1; Yasuda (4:32)	Tanahashi; Yoshie (12:21)
Nagata Nakanishi	Nagata; Nakanishi (19:14)	Nagata; Nakanishi (11:47)	Nagata; Nakanishi (Forfeit)	Nagata; Nakanishi (12:38)	—	Nishimura; Tenzan (21:05)	Takayama; TOA (15:16)	Draw (30:00)
Nishimura Tenzan	Barton; Steele (19:09)	Wolf; Nakamura (21:22)	Nishimura; Tenzan (Forfeit)	DCO (8:39)	Nishimura; Tenzan (21:05)	—	Nishimura; Tenzan (16:36)	Nishimura; Tenzan (18:22)
Takayama TOA	Takayama; TOA (13:11)	Takayama; TOA (Forfeit)	Takayama; TOA (Forfeit)	Makai #1; Yasuda (4:32)	Takayama; TOA (15:16)	Nishimura; Tenzan (16:36)	—	Takayama; TOA (9:00)
Tanahashi Yoshie	Tanahashi; Yoshie (30:58)	Wolf; Nakamura (10:13)	Tanahashi; Yoshie (Forfeit)	Tanahashi; Yoshie (12:21)	Draw (30:00)	Nishimura; Tenzan (18:22)	Takayama; TOA (9:00)	—

Semifinal			Final
			1	Yoshihiro Takayama and TOA	Pin
2	Osamu Nishimura and Hiroyoshi Tenzan	Sub	2	Osamu Nishimura and Hiroyoshi Tenzan	14:10
3	Yuji Nagata and Manabu Nakanishi	20:05

== One Night Tournaments ==
NJPW did not hold a Tag League in 2004 or 2005, nor a tournament that continued its format. Instead, they held 3 smaller-scale, 4-team, one-night, single-elimination tournaments in the intervening years. October 17, 2004 also featured another such tournament for three-man teams, one week before the ¥10 Million tournament.

President Hoshino 10 Million Yen Offer Tag Tournament

Occurred October 24, 2004. In-kayfabe, it was promoted by Kantaro Hoshino following the recent disolution of his villanous stable the Makai Club. Hiroyoshi Tenzan & Shinsuke Nakamura won the tournament - playing off of Nakamura's upset-defeat of Tenzan for the IWGP Title a year prior - and received trophies, but not the advertised ¥10 Million prize money pay-out, which Hoshino reserved for "his" group in one last act of heel chicanery.

Semifinals
Katsuyori Shibata and Masahiro Chono
Genichiro Tenryu and Kensuke Sasaki	17:53
Hiroyoshi Tenzan and Shinsuke Nakamura
Mitsuya Nagai and Toshiaki Kawada	20:53

Final
Katsuyori Shibata and Masahiro Chono
Hiroyoshi Tenzan and Shinsuke Nakamura	19:28

U-30 One Night Tag Tournament

Occurred on October 30, 2004, a mere week after the previous tournament. "U-30" refers to a division promoted by NJPW that exclusively highlighted their younger talents (Under the age of 30) and re-assure fans of the future during the tumults of Inokism. Co-winner Hiroshi Tanahashi was the reigning IWGP U-30 Openweight Championship at the time of his win, and would go on to be a generational main-event megastar for the company (albeit one who would never win an official NJPW Tag League).

Semifinals
Ryusuke Taguchi and Shinsuke Nakamura
Hirooki Goto and Katsuyori Shibata	11:44
Hiroshi Tanahashi and Taiji Ishimori
Blue Wolf and Katsuhiko Nakajima	13:30

Final
Ryusuke Taguchi and Shinsuke Nakamura
Hiroshi Tanahashi and Taiji Ishimori	14:49

Samurai! TV Openweight Tag Team Tournament

Occurred April 16, 2005. Was specifically promoted by NJPW's broadcast partner Fighting TV Samurai, and encouraged teams that combined heavyweight and junior heavyweight wrestlers.

Semifinals
Shinsuke Nakamura and Wataru Inoue
Minoru Tanaka and Togi Makabe	13:03
Hirooki Goto and Yuji Nagata
Hiroshi Tanahashi and Koji Kanemoto	15:08

Final
Shinsuke Nakamura and Wataru Inoue
Hirooki Goto and Yuji Nagata	21:03

== 2006 ==
After a three-year absence, the 2006 G1 Tag League featured two blocks of five and ran from October 15 to November 6. The winners did not receive a title match. However, only one of the reigning tag champions at the time (Manabu Nakanishi) even competed in the tournament, with a different partner. This also marked Masahiro Chono's final tournament-or-title win.

Final standings
Block A		Block B	
Takashi Iizuka and Yuji Nagata	6	Giant Bernard and Travis Tomko	6
Masahiro Chono and Shinsuke Nakamura	4	Koji Kanemoto and Hiroshi Tanahashi	4
Akebono and Riki Choshu	4	Jushin Thunder Liger and Hiroyoshi Tenzan	4
Gedo and Jado	4	Tomohiro Ishii and Toru Yano	3
Shiro Koshinaka and Togi Makabe	2	Manabu Nakanishi and Naofumi Yamamoto	3

Block A	Akebono Choshu	Chono Nakamura	Gedo Jado	Iizuka Nagata	Koshinaka Makabe
Akebono Choshu	—	Chono; Nakamura (8:45)	Akebono; Choshu (5:14)	Iizuka; Nagata (7:08)	Akebono; Choshu (8:20)
Chono Nakamura	Chono; Nakamura (8:45)	—	Chono; Nakamura (10:17)	Iizuka; Nagata (17:45)	Koshinaka; Makabe (11:54)
Gedo Jado	Akebono; Choshu (5:14)	Chono; Nakamura (10:17)	—	Gedo; Jado (16:47)	Gedo; Jado (10:24)
Iizuka Nagata	Iizuka; Nagata (7:08)	Iizuka; Nagata (17:45)	Gedo; Jado (16:47)	—	Iizuka; Nagata (17:12)
Koshinaka Makabe	Akebono; Choshu (8:20)	Koshinaka; Makabe (11:54)	Gedo; Jado (10:24)	Iizuka; Nagata (17:12)	—
Block B	Bernard Tomko	Ishii Yano	Kanemoto Tanahashi	Liger Tenzan	Nakanishi Yamamoto
Bernard Tomko	—	Bernard; Tomko (12:03)	Bernard; Tomko (17:16)	Bernard; Tomko (13:27)	Nakanishi; Yamamoto (12:33)
Ishii Yano	Bernard; Tomko (12:03)	—	Kanemoto; Tanahashi (19:01)	Draw (14:43)	Ishii; Yano (14:54)
Kanemoto Tanahashi	Bernard; Tomko (17:16)	Kanemoto; Tanahashi (19:01)	—	Draw (30:00)	Draw (30:00)
Liger Tenzan	Bernard; Tomko (13:27)	Draw (14:43)	Draw (30:00)	—	Liger; Tenzan (17:16)
Nakanishi Yamamoto	Nakanishi; Yamamoto (12:33)	Ishii; Yano (14:54)	Draw (30:00)	Liger; Tenzan (17:16)	—

Block B Decision
B2	Koji Kanemoto and Hiroshi Tanahashi	Pin
B3	Jushin Thunder Liger and Hiroyoshi Tenzan	14:24

Semifinals
A1	Takayuki Iizuka and Yuji Nagata	Sub
B2	Koji Kanemoto and Hiroshi Tanahashi	16:49
B1	Giant Bernard and Travis Tomko	Sub
A2	Masahiro Chono and Shinsuke Nakamura	8:16

Final
B2	Koji Kanemoto and Hiroshi Tanahashi	Pin
A2	Masahiro Chono and Shinsuke Nakamura	18:32

== 2007 ==
The 2007 G1 Tag League was held from October 18, 2007, to November 2, 2007, over ten shows, featuring eight teams in one block. Due to a four-way tie for first place, a four-team semifinal was set up, with the matchups being randomly drawn. Giant Bernard and Travis Tomko won whilst the reigning champions, and next defended the belts at the January 4th Tokyo Dome show against The Steiner Brothers.

Final standings
Wrestlers	Score
Giant Bernard and Travis Tomko	8
Hirooki Goto and Milano Collection AT	8
Koji Kanemoto and Hiroshi Tanahashi	8
Togi Makabe and Toru Yano	8
Takashi Iizuka and Naofumi Yamamoto	6
Gedo and Jado	6
Yuji Nagata and Manabu Nakanishi	6
Akebono and Masahiro Chono	6

Results	Akebono Chono	Bernard Tomko	Gedo Jado	Goto Milano	Iizuka Yamamoto	Kanemoto Tanahashi	Makabe Yano	Nagata Nakanishi
Akebono Chono	—	Bernard; Tomko (8:56)	Gedo; Jado (5:48)	Akebono; Chono (11:38)	Akebono; Chono (12:42)	Kanemoto; Tanahashi (13:49)	Makabe; Yano (10:59)	Akebono; Chono (17:08)
Bernard Tomko	Bernard; Tomko (8:56)	—	Bernard; Tomko (11:19)	Bernard; Tomko (14:46)	Iizuka; Yamamoto (8:53)	Bernard; Tomko (19:01)	Makabe; Yano (9:57)^{1}	Nagata; Nakanishi (13:53)
Gedo Jado	Gedo; Jado (5:48)	Bernard; Tomko (11:19)	—	Goto; Milano (14:22)	Gedo; Jado (12:54)	Kanemoto; Tanahashi (10:31)	Makabe; Yano (13:02)	Gedo; Jado (15:23)
Goto Milano	Akebono; Chono (11:38)	Bernard; Tomko (14:46)	Goto; Milano (14:22)	—	Iizuka; Yamamoto (13:42)	Goto; Milano (20:10)	Goto; Milano (13:22)	Goto; Milano (10:16)
Iizuka Yamamoto	Akebono; Chono (12:42)	Iizuka; Yamamoto (8:53)	Gedo; Jado (12:54)	Iizuka; Yamamoto (13:42)	—	Kanemoto; Tanahashi (20:40)	Iizuka; Yamamoto (10:13)	Nagata; Nakanishi (18:19)
Kanemoto Tanahashi	Kanemoto; Tanahashi (13:49)	Bernard; Tomko (19:01)	Kanemoto; Tanahashi (10:31)	Goto; Milano (20:10)	Kanemoto; Tanahashi (20:40)	—	Kanemoto; Tanahashi (14:25)	Nagata; Nakanishi (19:15)
Makabe Yano	Makabe; Yano (10:59)	Makabe; Yano (9:57)^{1}	Makabe; Yano (13:02)	Goto; Milano (13:22)	Iizuka; Yamamoto (10:13)	Kanemoto; Tanahashi (14:25)	—	Makabe; Yano (13:40)
Nagata Nakanishi	Akebono; Chono (17:08)	Nagata; Nakanishi (13:53)	Gedo; Jado (15:23)	Goto; Milano (10:16)	Nagata; Nakanishi (19:15)	Nagata; Nakanishi (19:15)	Makabe; Yano (13:40)	—

Semifinals
1	Giant Bernard and Travis Tomko	Pin
4	Togi Makabe and Toru Yano	6:44
2	Hirooki Goto and Milano Collection AT	Pin
3	Koji Kanemoto and Hiroshi Tanahashi	14:20

Final
1	Giant Bernard and Travis Tomko	Pin
3	Koji Kanemoto and Hiroshi Tanahashi	18:02

^{1}This was a handicap match, not involving Tomko due to scheduling conflicts.

== 2008 ==
The 2008 G1 Tag League, featuring 12 teams in two blocks, will be held from October 18 to November 5. Ten-Koji won their second tournament, but would not receive a title match, possibly due to Kojima's contract with All-Japan Pro Wrestling. A month later, they also won AJPW's Real World Tag League.

Final standings
Block A		Block B	
Satoshi Kojima and Hiroyoshi Tenzan	8	Togi Makabe and Toru Yano	8
Hirooki Goto and Shinsuke Nakamura	7	Manabu Nakanishi and Yutaka Yoshie	7
Giant Bernard and Rick Fuller	7	Gedo and Jado	6
Wataru Inoue and Koji Kanemoto	4	Tetsuya Naito and Yujiro	4
Taichi Ishikari and Milano Collection AT	2	Negro Casas and Rocky Romero	4
Takashi Iizuka and Tomohiro Ishii	2	Mitsuhide Hirasawa and Yuji Nagata	1

Block A	Bernard Fuller	Goto Nakamura	Iizuka Ishii	Inoue Kanemoto	Ishikari Milano	Kojima Tenzan
Bernard Fuller	—	Draw (10:38)	Bernard; Fuller (11:13)	Bernard; Fuller (14:15)	Bernard; Fuller (11:20)	Kojima; Tenzan (14:29)
Goto Nakamura	Draw (10:38)	—	Goto; Nakamura (10:16)	Goto; Nakamura (20:48)	Goto; Nakamura (16:40)	Kojima; Tenzan (24:47)
Iizuka Ishii	Bernard; Fuller (11:13)	Goto; Nakamura (10:16)	—	Inoue; Kanemoto (11:52)	Ishikari; Milano (3:53)	Iizuka; Ishii (11:15)
Inoue Kanemoto	Bernard; Fuller (14:15)	Goto; Nakamura (20:48)	Inoue; Kanemoto (11:52)	—	Inoue; Kanemoto (13:21)	Kojima; Tenzan (17:52)
Ishikari Milano	Bernard; Fuller (11:20)	Goto; Nakamura (16:40)	Ishikari; Milano (3:53)	Inoue; Kanemoto (13:21)	—	Kojima; Tenzan (15:28)
Kojima Tenzan	Kojima; Tenzan (14:29)	Kojima; Tenzan (24:47)	Iizuka; Ishii (11:15)	Kojima; Tenzan (17:52)	Kojima; Tenzan (15:28)	—
Block B	Gedo Jado	Hirasawa Nagata	Makabe Yano	Naito Yujiro	Nakanishi Yoshie	Casas Romero
Gedo Jado	—	Gedo; Jado (12:51)	Makabe; Yano (16:29)	Gedo; Jado (15:34)	Gedo; Jado (16:25)	Casas; Romero (11:53)
Hirasawa Nagata	Gedo; Jado (12:51)	—	Makabe; Yano (12:01)	Naito; Yujiro (12:18)	Draw (30:00)	Casas; Romero (9:34)
Makabe Yano	Makabe; Yano (16:29)	Makabe; Yano (12:01)	—	Makabe; Yano (13:36)	Nakanishi; Yoshie (18:30)	Makabe; Yano (13:00)
Naito Yujiro	Gedo; Jado (15:34)	Naito; Yujiro (12:18)	Makabe; Yano (13:36)	—	Nakanishi; Yoshie (15:57)	Naito; Yujiro (13:24)
Nakanishi Yoshie	Gedo; Jado (16:25)	Draw (30:00)	Nakanishi; Yoshie (18:30)	Nakanishi; Yoshie (15:57)	—	Nakanishi; Yoshie (9:57)
Casas Romero	Casas; Romero (11:53)	Casas; Romero (9:34)	Makabe; Yano (13:00)	Naito; Yujiro (13:24)	Nakanishi; Yoshie (9:57)	—

Block A Decision
A2	Hirooki Goto and Shinsuke Nakamura	Pin
A3	Giant Bernard and Rick Fuller	11:22

Semifinals
A1	Satoshi Kojima and Hiroyoshi Tenzan	Pin
B2	Manabu Nakanishi and Yutaka Yoshie	19:45
B1	Togi Makabe and Toru Yano	Pin
A2	Hirooki Goto and Shinsuke Nakamura	11:49

Final
A1	Satoshi Kojima and Hiroyoshi Tenzan	Sub
B1	Togi Makabe and Toru Yano	23:56

== 2009 ==
The 2009 G1 Tag League featured two blocks of five and ran from October 17 through November 1. Bad Intentions received their title match against Team 3D at the January 4th Tokyo Dome show, but were joined by No Limit to make it a triple threat match, which No Limit won.

Final standings
Block A		Block B	
Shinsuke Nakamura and Toru Yano	6	Giant Bernard and Karl Anderson	8
Manabu Nakanishi and Takao Omori	6	Prince Devitt and Ryusuke Taguchi	4
Yuji Nagata and Wataru Inoue	4	Togi Makabe and Tomoaki Honma	4
Tomohiro Ishii and Masato Tanaka	4	Masahiro Chono and Akira	2
Hirooki Goto and Kazuchika Okada	0	Gedo and Jado	2

Block A	Goto Okada	Inoue Nagata	Ishii Tanaka	Nakamura Yano	Nakanishi Omori
Goto Okada	—	Inoue; Nagata (17:06)	Ishii; Tanaka (12:00)	Nakamura; Yano (15:39)	Nakanishi; Omori (12:13)
Inoue Nagata	Inoue; Nagata (17:06)	—	Ishii; Tanaka (14:23)	Inoue; Nagata (16:27)	Nakanishi; Omori (17:07)
Ishii Tanaka	Ishii; Tanaka (12:00)	Ishii; Tanaka (14:23)	—	Nakamura; Yano (14:26)	Nakanishi; Omori (14:23)
Nakamura Yano	Nakamura; Yano (15:39)	Inoue; Nagata (16:27)	Nakamura; Yano (14:26)	—	Nakamura; Yano (16:55)
Nakanishi Omori	Nakanishi; Omori (12:13)	Nakanishi; Omori (17:07)	Nakanishi; Omori (14:23)	Nakamura; Yano (16:55)	—
Block B	Akira Chono	Anderson Bernard	Devitt Taguchi	Gedo Jado	Honma Makabe
Akira Chono	—	Anderson; Bernard (8:45)	Devitt; Taguchi (12:59)	Akira; Chono (13:10)	Honma; Makabe (14:16)
Anderson Bernard	Anderson; Bernard (8:45)	—	Anderson; Bernard (11:20)	Anderson; Bernard (11:51)	Anderson; Bernard (11:32)
Devitt Taguchi	Devitt; Taguchi (12:59)	Anderson; Bernard (11:20)	—	Gedo; Jado (13:23)	Devitt; Taguchi (10:29)
Gedo Jado	Akira; Chono (13:10)	Anderson; Bernard (11:51)	Gedo; Jado (13:23)	—	Honma; Makabe (13:02)
Honma Makabe	Honma; Makabe (14:16)	Anderson; Bernard (11:32)	Devitt; Taguchi (10:29)	Honma; Makabe (13:02)	—

Semifinals
A1	Shinsuke Nakamura and Toru Yano	Pin
B2	Prince Devitt and Ryusuke Taguchi	9:39
B1	Karl Anderson and Matt Bloom	Pin
A2	Manabu Nakanishi and Takao Omori	11:31

Final
B2	Prince Devitt and Ryusuke Taguchi	Pin
B1	Karl Anderson and Giant Bernard	16:01

== 2010 ==
The 2010 G1 Tag League featured two blocks of six and ran from October 22 through November 7. Winning team Seigigun were unsuccessful in unseating Bad Intentions as champions on December 11.

Final standings
Block A		Block B	
Yuji Nagata and Wataru Inoue	8	Tetsuya Naito and Yujiro Takahashi	6
Manabu Nakanishi and Strong Man	8	Giant Bernard and Karl Anderson	6
Masato Tanaka and Tomohiro Ishii	6	Hiroshi Tanahashi and Tajiri	6
Hirooki Goto and Tama Tonga	4	Daniel Puder and Shinsuke Nakamura	4
Togi Makabe and Tomoaki Honma	4	Terrible and El Texano, Jr.	4
King Fale and Super Strong Machine	0	Takashi Iizuka and Toru Yano	4

Block A	Goto Tonga	Fale Machine	Nakanishi Strong Man	Tanaka Ishii	Makabe Honma	Nagata Inoue
Goto Tonga	—	Goto; Tonga (10:56)	Nakanishi; Strong Man (10:38)	Tanaka; Ishii (13:50)	Goto; Tonga (14:09)	Nagata; Inoue (14:24)
Fale Machine	Goto; Tonga (10:56)	—	Nakanishi; Strong Man (11:48)	Tanaka; Ishii (11:00)	Makabe; Honma (8:24)	Nagata; Inoue (13:18)
Nakanishi Strong Man	Nakanishi; Strong Man (10:38)	Nakanishi; Strong Man (11:48)	—	Nakanishi; Strong Man (14:32)	Nakanishi; Strong Man (10:33)	Nagata; Inoue (10:39)
Tanaka Ishii	Tanaka; Ishii (13:50)	Tanaka; Ishii (11:00)	Nakanishi; Strong Man (14:32)	—	Tanaka; Ishii (13:43)	Nagata; Inoue (14:09)
Makabe Honma	Goto; Tonga (14:09)	Makabe; Honma (8:24)	Nakanishi; Strong Man (10:33)	Tanaka; Ishii (13:43)	—	Makabe; Honma (16:13)
Nagata Inoue	Nagata; Inoue (14:24)	Nagata; Inoue (13:18)	Nagata; Inoue (10:39)	Nagata; Inoue (14:09)	Makabe; Honma (16:13)	—
Block B	Puder Nakamura	Bernard Anderson	Tanahashi Tajiri	Iizuka Yano	Terrible Texano, Jr.	Naito Takahashi
Puder Nakamura	—	Bernard; Anderson (10:46)	Tanahashi; Tajiri (14:34)	Puder; Nakamura (8:37)	Puder; Nakamura (10:19)	Naito; Takahashi (11:56)
Bernard Anderson	Bernard; Anderson (10:46)	—	Bernard; Anderson (13:41)	Iizuka; Yano (14:06)	Bernard; Anderson (10:47)	Naito; Takahashi (15:23)
Tanahashi Tajiri	Tanahashi; Tajiri (14:34)	Bernard; Anderson (13:41)	—	Tanahashi; Tajiri (14:15)	Tanahashi; Tajiri (12:37)	Naito; Takahashi (17:47)
Iizuka Yano	Puder; Nakamura (8:37)	Iizuka; Yano (14:06)	Tanahashi; Tajiri (14:15)	—	Terrible; Texano, Jr. (8:47)	Iizuka; Yano (14:46)
Terrible Texano, Jr.	Puder; Nakamura (10:19)	Bernard; Anderson (10:47)	Tanahashi; Tajiri (12:37)	Terrible; Texano, Jr. (8:47)	—	Terrible; Texano, Jr. (12:07)
Naito Takahashi	Naito; Takahashi (11:56)	Naito; Takahashi (15:23)	Naito; Takahashi (17:47)	Iizuka; Yano (14:46)	Terrible; Texano, Jr. (12:07)	—

Semifinals
A1	Yuji Nagata and Wataru Inoue	Pin
B2	Giant Bernard and Karl Anderson	9:54
B1	Tetsuya Naito and Yujiro Takahashi	Pin
A2	Manabu Nakanishi and Strong Man	11:54

Final
A1	Yuji Nagata and Wataru Inoue	Pin
B1	Tetsuya Naito and Yujiro Takahashi	17:49

== 2011 ==
The 2011 G1 Tag League featured two blocks of six and ran from October 22 through November 6. Suzuki-gun lost their subsequent title match to Bad Intentions on November 12.

Final standings
Block A		Block B	
Giant Bernard and Karl Anderson	8	Shinsuke Nakamura and Toru Yano	10
Lance Archer and Minoru Suzuki	8	Hirooki Goto and Hiroshi Tanahashi	6
Masato Tanaka and Yujiro Takahashi	6	Satoshi Kojima and Togi Makabe	6
Tetsuya Naito and Tomoaki Honma	4	Don Fujii and Tomohiro Ishii	4
Strong Man and Tama Tonga	2	Hiroyoshi Tenzan and Wataru Inoue	4
King Fale and Yuji Nagata	2	Hideo Saito and Takashi Iizuka	0

Block A	Bernard Anderson	Fale Nagata	Archer Suzuki	Tanaka Takahashi	Strong Man Tonga	Naito Honma
Bernard Anderson	—	Bernard; Anderson (11:20)	Bernard; Anderson (11:50)	Tanaka; Takahashi (11:35)	Bernard; Anderson (12:01)	Bernard; Anderson (13:41)
Fale Nagata	Bernard; Anderson (11:20)	—	Archer; Suzuki (11:56)	Tanaka; Takahashi (11:49)	Strong Man; Tonga (10:30)	Fale; Nagata (12:09)
Archer Suzuki	Bernard; Anderson (11:50)	Archer; Suzuki (11:56)	—	Archer; Suzuki (12:24)	Archer; Suzuki (14:54)	Archer; Suzuki (12:49)
Tanaka Takahashi	Tanaka; Takahashi (11:35)	Tanaka; Takahashi (11:49)	Archer; Suzuki (12:24)	—	Tanaka; Takahashi (9:35)	Naito; Honma (10:45)
Strong Man Tonga	Bernard; Anderson (12:01)	Strong Man; Tonga (10:30)	Archer; Suzuki (14:54)	Tanaka; Takahashi (9:35)	—	Naito; Honma (11:56)
Naito Honma	Bernard; Anderson (13:41)	Fale; Nagata (12:09)	Archer; Suzuki (12:49)	Naito; Honma (10:45)	Naito; Honma (11:56)	—
Block B	Fujii Ishii	Saito Iizuka	Goto Tanahashi	Tenzan Inoue	Kojima Makabe	Nakamura Yano
Fujii Ishii	—	Fujii; Ishii (10:17)	Goto; Tanahashi (18:07)	Fujii; Ishii (12:22)	Kojima; Makabe (12:39)	Nakamura; Yano (13:21)
Saito Iizuka	Fujii; Ishii (10:17)	—	Goto; Tanahashi (14:16)	Tenzan; Inoue (12:37)	Kojima; Makabe (11:13)	Nakamura; Yano (10:02)
Goto Tanahashi	Goto; Tanahashi (18:07)	Goto; Tanahashi (14:16)	—	Tenzan; Inoue (15:37)	Goto; Tanahashi (17:49)	Nakamura; Yano (16:56)
Tenzan Inoue	Fujii; Ishii (12:22)	Tenzan; Inoue (12:37)	Tenzan; Inoue (15:37)	—	Kojima; Makabe (14:20)	Nakamura; Yano (15:37)
Kojima Makabe	Kojima; Makabe (12:39)	Kojima; Makabe (11:13)	Goto; Tanahashi (17:49)	Kojima; Makabe (14:20)	—	Nakamura; Yano (13:04)
Nakamura Yano	Nakamura; Yano (13:21)	Nakamura; Yano (10:02)	Nakamura; Yano (16:56)	Nakamura; Yano (15:37)	Nakamura; Yano (13:04)	—

Semifinals
A1	Giant Bernard and Karl Anderson	Pin
B2	Hirooki Goto and Hiroshi Tanahashi	12:10
B1	Shinsuke Nakamura and Toru Yano	Pin
A2	Lance Archer and Minoru Suzuki	12:08

Final
A1	Giant Bernard and Karl Anderson	Pin
A2	Lance Archer and Minoru Suzuki	17:42

== 2012 ==
The 2012 edition of the newly rebranded World Tag League took place from November 20 through December 2. Hirooki Goto and Karl Anderson's winning team "Sword & Guns" failed to defeat the reigning team of Killer Elite Squad (Davey Boy Smith, Jr. and Lance Archer) at Wrestle Kingdom 7.

Final standings
Block A		Block B	
Togi Makabe and Wataru Inoue	8	Hiroyoshi Tenzan and Satoshi Kojima	8
Hirooki Goto and Karl Anderson	8	Davey Boy Smith, Jr. and Lance Archer	8
Masaaki Mochizuki and Yuji Nagata	8	Masato Tanaka and Yujiro Takahashi	6
Shinsuke Nakamura and Tomohiro Ishii	6	Takashi Iizuka and Toru Yano	6
Kazuchika Okada and Yoshi-Hashi	6	MVP and Shelton Benjamin	6
Kengo Mashimo and Minoru Suzuki	6	Manabu Nakanishi and Strong Man	4
Captain New Japan and Hiroshi Tanahashi	0	Diamante Azul and Rush	4

Block A	Captain Tanahashi	Goto Anderson	Okada Yoshi-Hashi	Mashimo Suzuki	Mochizuki Nagata	Nakamura Ishii	Makabe Inoue
Captain Tanahashi	—	Goto; Anderson (11:54)	Okada; Yoshi-Hashi (14:09)	Mashimo; Suzuki (15:01)	Mochizuki; Nagata (13:14)	Nakamura; Ishii (14:36)	Makabe; Inoue (11:40)
Goto Anderson	Goto; Anderson (11:54)	—	Goto; Anderson (14:41)	Mashimo; Suzuki (11:09)	Goto; Anderson (13:02)	Goto; Anderson (15:14)	Makabe; Inoue (10:11)
Okada Yoshi-Hashi	Okada; Yoshi-Hashi (14:09)	Goto; Anderson (14:41)	—	Okada; Yoshi-Hashi (13:40)	Mochizuki; Nagata (12:17)	Nakamura; Ishii (14:12)	Okada; Yoshi-Hashi (12:43)
Mashimo Suzuki	Mashimo; Suzuki (15:01)	Mashimo; Suzuki (11:09)	Okada; Yoshi-Hashi (13:40)	—	Mochizuki; Nagata (11:14)	Nakamura; Ishii (13:54)	Mashimo; Suzuki (10:27)
Mochizuki Nagata	Mochizuki; Nagata (13:14)	Goto; Anderson (13:02)	Mochizuki; Nagata (12:17)	Mochizuki; Nagata (11:14)	—	Mochizuki; Nagata (11:29)	Makabe; Inoue (10:32)
Nakamura Ishii	Nakamura; Ishii (14:36)	Goto; Anderson (15:14)	Nakamura; Ishii (14:12)	Nakamura; Ishii (13:54)	Mochizuki; Nagata (11:29)	—	Makabe; Inoue (13:17)
Makabe Inoue	Makabe; Inoue (11:40)	Makabe; Inoue (10:11)	Okada; Yoshi-Hashi (12:43)	Mashimo; Suzuki (10:27)	Makabe; Inoue (10:32)	Makabe; Inoue (13:17)	—
Block B	Smith Archer	Azul Rush	Tenzan Kojima	Nakanishi Strong Man	Tanaka Takahashi	MVP Benjamin	Iizuka Yano
Smith Archer	—	Smith; Archer (5:33)	Tenzan; Kojima (13:29)	Smith; Archer (10:02)	Smith; Archer (10:13)	MVP; Benjamin (12:45)	Smith; Archer (8:47)
Azul Rush	Smith; Archer (5:33)	—	Azul; Rush (10:49)	Nakanishi; Strong Man (6:22)	Azul; Rush (7:46)	MVP; Benjamin (3:16)	Iizuka; Yano (8:44)
Tenzan Kojima	Tenzan; Kojima (13:29)	Azul; Rush (10:49)	—	Tenzan; Kojima (12:34)	Tenzan; Kojima (15:14)	Tenzan; Kojima (14:02)	Iizuka; Yano (13:50)
Nakanishi Strong Man	Smith; Archer (10:02)	Nakanishi; Strong Man (6:22)	Tenzan; Kojima (12:34)	—	Tanaka; Takahashi (9:35)	MVP; Benjamin (12:22)	Nakanishi; Strong Man (8:46)
Tanaka Takahashi	Smith; Archer (10:13)	Azul; Rush (7:46)	Tenzan; Kojima (15:14)	Tanaka; Takahashi (9:35)	—	Tanaka; Takahashi (10:08)	Tanaka; Takahashi (10:29)
MVP Benjamin	MVP; Benjamin (12:45)	MVP; Benjamin (3:16)	Tenzan; Kojima (14:02)	MVP; Benjamin (12:22)	Tanaka; Takahashi (10:08)	—	Iizuka; Yano (5:29)
Iizuka Yano	Smith; Archer (8:47)	Iizuka; Yano (8:44)	Iizuka; Yano (13:50)	Nakanishi; Strong Man (8:46)	Tanaka; Takahashi (10:29)	Iizuka; Yano (5:29)	—

Semifinals
A1	Togi Makabe and Wataru Inoue	Pin
B2	Davey Boy Smith Jr. and Lance Archer	12:10
B1	Hiroyoshi Tenzan and Satoshi Kojima	Pin
A2	Hirooki Goto and Karl Anderson	14:41

Final
B2	Davey Boy Smith Jr. and Lance Archer	Pin
A2	Hirooki Goto and Karl Anderson	15:36

== 2013 ==
The 2013 edition of the World Tag League took place from November 23 through December 8. The winning Bullet Club team dethroned Killer Elite Squad at Wrestle Kingdom 8, succeeding as heels where Anderson's face team with Goto had failed the previous year.

Final standings
Block A		Block B	
Davey Boy Smith, Jr. and Lance Archer	10	Doc Gallows and Karl Anderson	8
Togi Makabe and Tomoaki Honma	8	Hiroyoshi Tenzan and Satoshi Kojima	8
Bad Luck Fale and Prince Devitt	6	Jax Dane and Rob Conway	6
Masato Tanaka and Yujiro Takahashi	6	Minoru Suzuki and Shelton X Benjamin	6
Shinsuke Nakamura and Tomohiro Ishii	6	La Sombra and Tetsuya Naito	6
Manabu Nakanishi and Strong Man	4	Kazuchika Okada and Yoshi-Hashi	4
Captain New Japan and Hiroshi Tanahashi	2	Takashi Iizuka and Toru Yano	4

Block A	Fale Devitt	Captain Tanahashi	Smith Archer	Nakanishi Strong Man	Tanaka Takahashi	Nakamura Ishii	Makabe Honma
Fale Devitt	—	Captain; Tanahashi (10:10)	Smith; Archer (9:12)	Fale; Devitt (7:38)	Fale; Devitt (8:58)	Nakamura; Ishii (10:47)	Fale; Devitt (10:11)
Captain Tanahashi	Captain; Tanahashi (10:10)	—	Smith; Archer (10:29)	Nakanishi; Strong Man (9:05)	Tanaka; Takahashi (11:18)	Nakamura; Ishii (13:12)	Makabe; Honma (10:16)
Smith Archer	Smith; Archer (9:12)	Smith; Archer (10:29)	—	Smith; Archer (9:08)	Smith; Archer (10:17)	Nakamura; Ishii (13:02)	Smith; Archer (11:09)
Nakanishi Strong Man	Fale; Devitt (7:38)	Nakanishi; Strong Man (9:05)	Smith; Archer (9:08)	—	Tanaka; Takahashi (9:13)	Nakanishi; Strong Man (8:32)	Makabe; Honma (8:35)
Tanaka Takahashi	Fale; Devitt (8:58)	Tanaka; Takahashi (11:18)	Smith; Archer (10:17)	Tanaka; Takahashi (9:13)	—	Tanaka; Takahashi (14:10)	Makabe; Honma (10:52)
Nakamura Ishii	Nakamura; Ishii (10:47)	Nakamura; Ishii (13:12)	Nakamura; Ishii (13:02)	Nakanishi; Strong Man (8:32)	Tanaka; Takahashi (14:10)	—	Makabe; Honma (13:05)
Makabe Honma	Fale; Devitt (10:11)	Makabe; Honma (10:16)	Smith; Archer (11:09)	Makabe; Honma (8:35)	Makabe; Honma (10:52)	Makabe; Honma (13:05)	—
Block B	Gallows Anderson	Tenzan Kojima	Dane Conway	Okada Yoshi-Hashi	Suzuki Benjamin	Sombra Naito	Iizuka Yano
Gallows Anderson	—	Gallows; Anderson (9:45)	Gallows; Anderson (9:25)	Gallows; Anderson (11:09)	Suzuki; Benjamin (9:51)	Sombra; Naito (11:22)	Gallows; Anderson (9:56)
Tenzan Kojima	Gallows; Anderson (9:45)	—	Tenzan; Kojima (10:36)	Tenzan; Kojima (13:29)	Tenzan; Kojima (12:39)	Tenzan; Kojima (12:49)	Iizuka; Yano (8:57)
Dane Conway	Gallows; Anderson (9:25)	Tenzan; Kojima (10:36)	—	Dane; Conway (11:05)	Suzuki; Benjamin (9:06)	Dane; Conway (8:23)	Dane; Conway (8:02)
Okada Yoshi-Hashi	Gallows; Anderson (11:09)	Tenzan; Kojima (13:29)	Dane; Conway (11:05)	—	Suzuki; Benjamin (11:37)	Okada; Yoshi-Hashi (14:04)	Okada; Yoshi-Hashi (11:39)
Suzuki Benjamin	Suzuki; Benjamin (9:51)	Tenzan; Kojima (12:39)	Suzuki; Benjamin (9:06)	Suzuki; Benjamin (11:37)	—	Sombra; Naito (7:02)	Iizuka; Yano (7:33)
Sombra Naito	Sombra; Naito (11:22)	Tenzan; Kojima (12:49)	Dane; Conway (8:23)	Okada; Yoshi-Hashi (14:04)	Sombra; Naito (7:02)	—	Sombra; Naito (9:08)
Iizuka Yano	Gallows; Anderson (9:56)	Iizuka; Yano (8:57)	Dane; Conway (8:02)	Okada; Yoshi-Hashi (11:39)	Iizuka; Yano (7:33)	Sombra; Naito (9:08)	—

Semifinals
A1	Davey Boy Smith Jr. and Lance Archer	Pin
B2	Hiroyoshi Tenzan and Satoshi Kojima	12:54
B1	Doc Gallows and Karl Anderson	Pin
A2	Togi Makabe and Tomoaki Honma	8:38

Final
B2	Hiroyoshi Tenzan and Satoshi Kojima	Pin
B1	Doc Gallows and Karl Anderson	18:57

== 2014 ==
The 2014 edition of the World Tag League took place from November 22 through December 7. Following his team's opening match in the tournament, Yoshitatsu was forced to pull out of the tournament with a neck injury, leading to him and Hiroshi Tanahashi forfeiting the rest of their matches. The winners - Meiyu Tag, consisting of Hirooki Goto and his childhood friend Katsuyori Shibata - went on to defeat Bullet Club at Wrestle Kingdom 9 and end their year-long reign of terror, culminating a 3-year arc for the tournament.

Final standings
Block A		Block B	
Doc Gallows and Karl Anderson	10	Hirooki Goto and Katsuyori Shibata	8
Matt Taven and Michael Bennett	8	Shinsuke Nakamura and Tomohiro Ishii	8
La Sombra and Tetsuya Naito	8	Davey Boy Smith, Jr. and Lance Archer	8
Kazuchika Okada and Yoshi-Hashi	8	Kazushi Sakuraba and Toru Yano	7
AJ Styles and Yujiro Takahashi	8	Minoru Suzuki and Takashi Iizuka	7
Hiroyoshi Tenzan and Satoshi Kojima	8	Bad Luck Fale and Tama Tonga	6
Jax Dane and Rob Conway	6	Manabu Nakanishi and Yuji Nagata	6
Hiroshi Tanahashi and Yoshitatsu	0	Togi Makabe and Tomoaki Honma	6

Block A	Styles Takahashi	Gallows Anderson	Tanahashi Yoshitatsu	Tenzan Kojima	Dane Conway	Okada Yoshi-Hashi	Taven Bennett	Sombra Naito
Styles Takahashi	—	Styles; Takahashi (10:21)	Styles; Takahashi (forfeit)	Styles; Takahashi (14:06)	Styles; Takahashi (8:48)	Okada; Yoshi-Hashi (11:56)	Taven; Bennett (10:41)	Sombra; Naito (11:36)
Gallows Anderson	Styles; Takahashi (10:21)	—	Gallows; Anderson (forfeit)	Tenzan; Kojima (9:48)	Gallows; Anderson (7:29)	Gallows; Anderson (11:17)	Gallows; Anderson (8:45)	Gallows; Anderson (10:32)
Tanahashi Yoshitatsu	Styles; Takahashi (forfeit)	Gallows; Anderson (forfeit)	—	Tenzan; Kojima (forfeit)	Dane; Conway (forfeit)	Okada; Yoshi-Hashi (12:31)	Taven; Bennett (forfeit)	Sombra; Naito (forfeit)
Tenzan Kojima	Styles; Takahashi (14:06)	Tenzan; Kojima (9:48)	Tenzan; Kojima (forfeit)	—	Tenzan; Kojima (8:04)	Tenzan; Kojima (13:26)	Taven; Bennett (7:29)	Sombra; Naito (11:20)
Dane Conway	Styles; Takahashi (8:48)	Gallows; Anderson (7:29)	Dane; Conway (forfeit)	Tenzan; Kojima (8:04)	—	Okada; Yoshi-Hashi (8:59)	Dane; Conway (6:31)	Dane; Conway (7:46)
Okada Yoshi-Hashi	Okada; Yoshi-Hashi (11:56)	Gallows; Anderson (11:17)	Okada; Yoshi-Hashi (12:31)	Tenzan; Kojima (13:26)	Okada; Yoshi-Hashi (8:59)	—	Okada; Yoshi-Hashi (12:00)	Sombra; Naito (14:29)
Taven Bennett	Taven; Bennett (10:41)	Gallows; Anderson (8:45)	Taven; Bennett (forfeit)	Taven; Bennett (7:29)	Dane; Conway (6:31)	Okada; Yoshi-Hashi (12:00)	—	Taven; Bennett (9:35)
Sombra Naito	Sombra; Naito (11:36)	Gallows; Anderson (10:32)	Sombra; Naito (forfeit)	Sombra; Naito (11:20)	Dane; Conway (7:46)	Sombra; Naito (14:29)	Taven; Bennett (9:35)	—
Block B	Fale Tonga	Smith Archer	Goto Shibata	Sakuraba Yano	Nakanishi Nagata	Suzuki Iizuka	Nakamura Ishii	Makabe Honma
Fale Tonga	—	Smith; Archer (6:25)	Fale; Tonga (10:10)	Fale; Tonga (9:20)	Fale; Tonga (7:54)	Suzuki; Iizuka (8:32)	Nakamura; Ishii (11:02)	Makabe; Honma (9:19)
Smith Archer	Smith; Archer (6:25)	—	Goto; Shibata (10:04)	Sakuraba; Yano (7:51)	Smith; Archer (11:08)	Smith; Archer (11:09)	Nakamura; Ishii (10:56)	Smith; Archer (11:49)
Goto Shibata	Fale; Tonga (10:10)	Goto; Shibata (10:04)	—	Sakuraba; Yano (9:24)	Nakanishi; Nagata (11:04)	Goto; Shibata (10:00)	Goto; Shibata (9:55)	Goto; Shibata (9:05)
Sakuraba Yano	Fale; Tonga (9:20)	Sakuraba; Yano (7:51)	Sakuraba; Yano (9:24)	—	Nakanishi; Nagata (10:14)	Draw (10:42)	Sakuraba; Yano (12:07)	Makabe; Honma (9:10)
Nakanishi Nagata	Fale; Tonga (7:54)	Smith; Archer (11:08)	Nakanishi; Nagata (11:04)	Nakanishi; Nagata (10:14)	—	Suzuki; Iizuka (9:54)	Nakamura; Ishii (8:11)	Nakanishi; Nagata (10:27)
Suzuki Iizuka	Suzuki; Iizuka (8:32)	Smith; Archer (11:09)	Goto; Shibata (10:00)	Draw (10:42)	Suzuki; Iizuka (9:54)	—	Suzuki; Iizuka (11:57)	Makabe; Honma (9:30)
Nakamura Ishii	Nakamura; Ishii (11:02)	Nakamura; Ishii (10:56)	Goto; Shibata (9:55)	Sakuraba; Yano (12:07)	Nakamura; Ishii (8:11)	Suzuki; Iizuka (11:57)	—	Nakamura; Ishii (15:25)
Makabe Honma	Makabe; Honma (9:19)	Smith; Archer (11:49)	Goto; Shibata (9:05)	Makabe; Honma (9:10)	Nakanishi; Nagata (10:27)	Makabe; Honma (9:30)	Nakamura; Ishii (15:25)	—

Final
A1	Doc Gallows and Karl Anderson	Pin
B1	Hirooki Goto and Katsuyori Shibata	20:58

== 2015 ==
The 2015 edition of the World Tag League took place from November 21 through December 9. A.J. Styles was sidelined with a back injury following November 24, forcing him and Yujiro Takahashi to forfeit the rest of their matches. Great Bash Heel team Togi Makabe and Tomoaki Honma won and defeated Bullet Club at Wrestle Kingdom 10, ending their final reigns as tag champions.

Final standings
Block A		Block B	
Togi Makabe and Tomoaki Honma	8	Evil and Tetsuya Naito	10
Hiroshi Tanahashi and Michael Elgin	8	Hirooki Goto and Katsuyori Shibata	8
Christopher Daniels and Frankie Kazarian	6	Doc Gallows and Karl Anderson	8
Kazuchika Okada and Yoshi-Hashi	6	Shinsuke Nakamura and Tomohiro Ishii	6
Kazushi Sakuraba and Toru Yano	6	Matt Taven and Michael Bennett	4
Bad Luck Fale and Tama Tonga	4	Hiroyoshi Tenzan and Satoshi Kojima	4
Manabu Nakanishi and Yuji Nagata	4	A.J. Styles and Yujiro Takahashi	2

Block A	Fale Tonga	Daniels Kazarian	Tanahashi Elgin	Okada Yoshi-Hashi	Sakuraba Yano	Nakanishi Nagata	Makabe Honma
Fale Tonga	—	Daniels; Kazarian (11:40)	Fale; Tonga (13:56)	Okada; Yoshi-Hashi (11:16)	Sakuraba; Yano (3:38)	Fale; Tonga (9:32)	Makabe; Honma (9:02)
Daniels Kazarian	Daniels; Kazarian (11:40)	—	Tanahashi; Elgin (13:15)	Daniels; Kazarian (12:06)	Sakuraba; Yano (7:40)	Daniels; Kazarian (9:23)	Makabe; Honma (10:05)
Tanahashi Elgin	Fale; Tonga (13:56)	Tanahashi; Elgin (13:15)	—	Tanahashi; Elgin (17:40)	Tanahashi; Elgin (12:19)	Tanahashi; Elgin (14:02)	Makabe; Honma (14:59)
Okada Yoshi-Hashi	Okada; Yoshi-Hashi (11:16)	Daniels; Kazarian (12:06)	Tanahashi; Elgin (17:40)	—	Okada; Yoshi-Hashi (12:31)	Okada; Yoshi-Hashi (12:04)	Makabe; Honma (14:31)
Sakuraba Yano	Sakuraba; Yano (3:38)	Sakuraba; Yano (7:40)	Tanahashi; Elgin (12:19)	Okada; Yoshi-Hashi (12:31)	—	Nakanishi; Nagata (10:09)	Sakuraba; Yano (7:22)
Nakanishi Nagata	Fale; Tonga (9:32)	Daniels; Kazarian (9:23)	Tanahashi; Elgin (14:02)	Okada; Yoshi-Hashi (12:04)	Nakanishi; Nagata (10:09)	—	Nakanishi; Nagata (10:06)
Makabe Honma	Makabe; Honma (9:02)	Makabe; Honma (10:05)	Makabe; Honma (14:59)	Makabe; Honma (14:31)	Sakuraba; Yano (7:22)	Nakanishi; Nagata (10:06)	—
Block B	Styles Takahashi	Gallows Anderson	Evil Naito	Goto Shibata	Tenzan Kojima	Taven Bennett	Nakamura Ishii
Styles Takahashi	—	Gallows; Anderson (forfeit)	Evil; Naito (forfeit)	Goto; Shibata (forfeit)	Tenzan; Kojima (11:56)	Taven; Bennett (forfeit)	Styles; Takahashi (14:56)
Gallows Anderson	Gallows; Anderson (forfeit)	—	Evil; Naito (12:06)	Goto; Shibata (14:43)	Gallows; Anderson (10:51)	Gallows; Anderson (9:22)	Gallows; Anderson (11:55)
Evil Naito	Evil; Naito (forfeit)	Evil; Naito (12:06)	—	Evil; Naito (13:36)	Evil; Naito (11:08)	Evil; Naito (9:53)	Nakamura; Ishii (16:21)
Goto Shibata	Goto; Shibata (forfeit)	Goto; Shibata (14:43)	Evil; Naito (13:36)	—	Tenzan; Kojima (11:30)	Goto; Shibata (9:24)	Goto; Shibata (12:48)
Tenzan Kojima	Tenzan; Kojima (11:56)	Gallows; Anderson (10:51)	Evil; Naito (11:08)	Tenzan; Kojima (11:30)	—	Taven; Bennett (12:07)	Nakamura; Ishii (15:02)
Taven Bennett	Taven; Bennett (forfeit)	Gallows; Anderson (9:22)	Evil; Naito (9:53)	Goto; Shibata (9:24)	Taven; Bennett (12:07)	—	Nakamura; Ishii (10:41)
Nakamura Ishii	Styles; Takahashi (14:56)	Gallows; Anderson (11:55)	Nakamura; Ishii (16:21)	Goto; Shibata (12:48)	Nakamura; Ishii (15:02)	Nakamura; Ishii (10:41)	—

Final
A1	Togi Makabe and Tomoaki Honma	Pin
B1	Evil and Tetsuya Naito	21:36

== 2016 ==
The 2016 edition of the World Tag League took place from November 18 through December 10. Great Bash Heel became the third set of back-to-back winners in tournament history, beating reigning champions Guerrillas Of Destiny in the final. However, CHAOS' Toru Yano stole both their trophies & G.O.D.'s championship belts in order to leverage himself & Tomohiro Ishii a spot in the Wrestle Kingdom 11 tag title match, which they won.

Final standings
Block A		Block B	
Tama Tonga and Tanga Loa	12	Togi Makabe and Tomoaki Honma	10
Hangman Page and Yujiro Takahashi	8	Evil and Sanada	10
Hanson and Raymond Rowe	8	Kazuchika Okada and Yoshi-Hashi	8
Hiroyoshi Tenzan and Satoshi Kojima	8	Katsuyori Shibata and Yuji Nagata	8
Rush and Tetsuya Naito	8	Hirooki Goto and Tomohiro Ishii	8
Hiroshi Tanahashi and Juice Robinson	6	Billy Gunn and Yoshitatsu	6
Brian Breaker and Leland Race	6	Chase Owens and Kenny Omega	6
Henare and Manabu Nakanishi	0	Bad Luck Fale and Bone Soldier	0

Block A	Breaker Race	Page Takahashi	Hanson Rowe	Henare Nakanishi	Tanahashi Robinson	Tenzan Kojima	Rush Naito	Tonga Loa
Breaker Race	—	Breaker; Race (11:13)	Hanson; Rowe (9:27)	Breaker; Race (11:54)	Tanahashi; Robinson (15:12)	Breaker; Race (10:02)	Rush; Naito (12:17)	Tonga; Loa (10:43)
Page Takahashi	Breaker; Race (11:13)	—	Page; Takahashi (12:07)	Page; Takahashi (8:54)	Tanahashi; Robinson (15:59)	Page; Takahashi (11:31)	Page; Takahashi (13:03)	Tonga; Loa (11:23)
Hanson Rowe	Hanson; Rowe (9:27)	Page; Takahashi (12:07)	—	Hanson; Rowe (7:03)	Hanson; Rowe (11:49)	Hanson; Rowe (8:44)	Rush; Naito (13:33)	Tonga; Loa (11:33)
Henare Nakanishi	Breaker; Race (11:54)	Page; Takahashi (8:54)	Hanson; Rowe (7:03)	—	Tanahashi; Robinson (13:41)	Tenzan; Kojima (9:50)	Rush; Naito (13:23)	Tonga; Loa (10:18)
Tanahashi Robinson	Tanahashi; Robinson (15:12)	Tanahashi; Robinson (15:59)	Hanson; Rowe (11:49)	Tanahashi; Robinson (13:41)	—	Tenzan; Kojima (18:49)	Rush; Naito (16:50)	Tonga; Loa (14:51)
Tenzan Kojima	Breaker; Race (10:02)	Page; Takahashi (11:31)	Hanson; Rowe (8:44)	Tenzan; Kojima (9:50)	Tenzan; Kojima (18:49)	—	Tenzan; Kojima (14:15)	Tenzan; Kojima (11:06)
Rush Naito	Rush; Naito (12:17)	Page; Takahashi (13:03)	Rush; Naito (13:33)	Rush; Naito (13:23)	Rush; Naito (16:50)	Tenzan; Kojima (14:15)	—	Tonga; Loa (13:55)
Tonga Loa	Tonga; Loa (10:43)	Tonga; Loa (11:23)	Tonga; Loa (11:33)	Tonga; Loa (10:18)	Tonga; Loa (14:51)	Tenzan; Kojima (11:06)	Tonga; Loa (13:55)	—
Block B	Fale Soldier	Gunn Yoshitatsu	Owens Omega	Evil Sanada	Goto Ishii	Shibata Nagata	Okada Yoshi-Hashi	Makabe Honma
Fale Soldier	—	Gunn; Yoshitatsu (7:57)	Owens; Omega (7:41)	Evil; Sanada (9:30)	Goto; Ishii (9:20)	Shibata; Nagata (10:53)	Okada; Yoshi-Hashi (12:30)	Makabe; Honma (7:50)
Gunn Yoshitatsu	Gunn; Yoshitatsu (7:57)	—	Gunn; Yoshitatsu (10:40)	Evil; Sanada (9:22)	Goto; Ishii (12:40)	Shibata; Nagata (11:01)	Okada; Yoshi-Hashi (14:11)	Gunn; Yoshitatsu
Owens Omega	Owens; Omega (7:41)	Gunn; Yoshitatsu (10:40)	—	Evil; Sanada (9:01)	Goto; Ishii (10:36)	Owens; Omega (13:04)	Owens; Omega (17:33)	Makabe; Honma (12:36)
Evil Sanada	Evil; Sanada (9:30)	Evil; Sanada (9:22)	Evil; Sanada (9:01)	—	Goto; Ishii (14:27)	Evil; Sanada (12:02)	Evil; Sanada (12:38)	Makabe; Honma (16:20)
Goto Ishii	Goto; Ishii (9:20)	Goto; Ishii (12:40)	Goto; Ishii (10:36)	Goto; Ishii (14:27)	—	Shibata; Nagata (16:50)	Okada; Yoshi-Hashi (21:32)	Makabe; Honma (19:21)
Shibata Nagata	Shibata; Nagata (10:53)	Shibata; Nagata (11:01)	Owens; Omega (13:04)	Evil; Sanada (12:02)	Shibata; Nagata (16:50)	—	Okada; Yoshi-Hashi (17:30)	Shibata; Nagata (10:58)
Okada Yoshi-Hashi	Okada; Yoshi-Hashi (12:30)	Okada; Yoshi-Hashi (14:11)	Owens; Omega (17:33)	Evil; Sanada (12:38)	Okada; Yoshi-Hashi (21:32)	Okada; Yoshi-Hashi (17:30)	—	Makabe; Honma (17:03)
Makabe Honma	Makabe; Honma (7:50)	Gunn; Yoshitatsu	Makabe; Honma (12:36)	Makabe; Honma (16:20)	Makabe; Honma (19:21)	Shibata; Nagata (10:58)	Makabe; Honma (17:03)	—

Final
A1	Tama Tonga and Tanga Loa	Pin
B1	Togi Makabe and Tomoaki Honma	26:39

== 2017 ==
The 2017 edition of the World Tag League took place from November 18 through December 11. The tournament featured the NJPW debuts of Chuckie T., Jeff Cobb and Sami Callihan. The tournament featured a format change, where several top wrestlers, namely Hiroshi Tanahashi, Kazuchika Okada, Kenny Omega and Tetsuya Naito, who already had matches booked for Wrestle Kingdom 12, were left out of the tournament. Los Ingobernables de Japon members Evil and Sanada won the tournament, and the titles at Wrestle Kingdom 12 from Killer Elite Squad.

Final standings
Block A		Block B	
Evil and Sanada	10	Tama Tonga and Tanga Loa	10
Juice Robinson and Sami Callihan	8	Hanson and Raymond Rowe	10
Hangman Page and Yujiro Takahashi	8	Davey Boy Smith, Jr. and Lance Archer	10
Hirooki Goto and Yoshi-Hashi	8	Beretta and Chuckie T.	8
Bad Luck Fale and Chase Owens	6	Jeff Cobb and Michael Elgin	8
Hiroyoshi Tenzan and Satoshi Kojima	6	Tomohiro Ishii and Toru Yano	8
Minoru Suzuki and Takashi Iizuka	6	Henare and Togi Makabe	2
Manabu Nakanishi and Yuji Nagata	4	David Finlay and Katsuya Kitamura	0

Block A	Fale Owens	Evil Sanada	Page Takahashi	Goto Yoshi-Hashi	Tenzan Kojima	Robinson Callihan	Nakanishi Nagata	Suzuki Iizuka
Fale Owens	—	Evil; Sanada (9:40)	Fale; Owens (8:46)	Goto; Yoshi-Hashi (9:36)	Fale; Owens (11:43)	Fale; Owens (9:10)	Nakanishi; Nagata (8:05)	Suzuki; Iizuka (10:03)
Evil Sanada	Evil; Sanada (9:40)	—	Evil; Sanada (12:14)	Evil; Sanada (18:12)	Evil; Sanada (11:45)	Robinson; Callihan (19:29)	Evil; Sanada (10:15)	Suzuki; Iizuka (13:20)
Page Takahashi	Fale; Owens (8:46)	Evil; Sanada (12:14)	—	Page; Takahashi (11:01)	Page; Takahashi (9:48)	Robinson; Callihan (11:12)	Page; Takahashi (10:46)	Page; Takahashi (5:28)
Goto Yoshi-Hashi	Goto; Yoshi-Hashi (9:36)	Evil; Sanada (18:12)	Page; Takahashi (11:01)	—	Goto; Yoshi-Hashi (11:08)	Robinson; Callihan (12:10)	Goto; Yoshi-Hashi (11:55)	Goto; Yoshi-Hashi (13:09)
Tenzan Kojima	Fale; Owens (11:43)	Evil; Sanada (11:45)	Page; Takahashi (9:48)	Goto; Yoshi-Hashi (11:08)	—	Tenzan; Kojima (12:28)	Tenzan; Kojima (13:48)	Tenzan; Kojima (11:47)
Robinson Callihan	Fale; Owens (9:10)	Robinson; Callihan (19:29)	Robinson; Callihan (11:12)	Robinson; Callihan (12:10)	Tenzan; Kojima (12:28)	—	Robinson; Callihan (12:18)	Suzuki; Iizuka (8:56)
Nakanishi Nagata	Nakanishi; Nagata (8:05)	Evil; Sanada (10:15)	Page; Takahashi (10:46)	Goto; Yoshi-Hashi (11:55)	Tenzan; Kojima (13:48)	Robinson; Callihan (12:18)	—	Nakanishi; Nagata (12:03)
Suzuki Iizuka	Suzuki; Iizuka (10:03)	Suzuki; Iizuka (13:20)	Page; Takahashi (5:28)	Goto; Yoshi-Hashi (13:09)	Tenzan; Kojima (11:47)	Suzuki; Iizuka (8:56)	Nakanishi; Nagata (12:03)	—
Block B	Beretta Chuckie	Smith Archer	Finlay Kitamura	Hanson Rowe	Henare Makabe	Cobb Elgin	Tonga Loa	Ishii Yano
Beretta Chuckie	—	Smith; Archer (11:26)	Beretta; Chuckie (7:26)	Hanson; Rowe (14:11)	Beretta; Chuckie (9:23)	Beretta; Chuckie (17:08)	Beretta; Chuckie (11:07)	Ishii; Yano (9:27)
Smith Archer	Smith; Archer (11:26)	—	Smith; Archer (10:04)	Hanson; Rowe (16:33)	Smith; Archer (10:10)	Smith; Archer (14:40)	Tonga; Loa (9:42)	Smith; Archer (12:48)
Finlay Kitamura	Beretta; Chuckie (7:26)	Smith; Archer (10:04)	—	Hanson; Rowe (7:47)	Henare; Makabe (6:33)	Cobb; Elgin (8:26)	Tonga; Loa (9:45)	Ishii; Yano (8:34)
Hanson Rowe	Hanson; Rowe (14:11)	Hanson; Rowe (16:33)	Hanson; Rowe (7:47)	—	Hanson; Rowe (9:44)	Hanson; Rowe (13:08)	Tonga; Loa (14:04)	Ishii; Yano (13:05)
Henare Makabe	Beretta; Chuckie (9:23)	Smith; Archer (10:10)	Henare; Makabe (6:33)	Hanson; Rowe (9:44)	—	Cobb; Elgin (7:35)	Tonga; Loa (9:04)	Ishii; Yano (8:29)
Cobb Elgin	Beretta; Chuckie (17:08)	Smith; Archer (14:40)	Cobb; Elgin (8:26)	Hanson; Rowe (13:08)	Cobb; Elgin (7:35)	—	Cobb; Elgin (14:35)	Cobb; Elgin (13:28)
Tonga Loa	Beretta; Chuckie (11:07)	Tonga; Loa (9:42)	Tonga; Loa (9:45)	Tonga; Loa (14:04)	Tonga; Loa (9:04)	Cobb; Elgin (14:35)	—	Tonga; Loa (11:27)
Ishii Yano	Ishii; Yano (9:27)	Smith; Archer (12:48)	Ishii; Yano (8:34)	Ishii; Yano (13:05)	Ishii; Yano (8:29)	Cobb; Elgin (13:28)	Tonga; Loa (11:27)	—

Final
A1	Evil and Sanada	Pin
B1	Tama Tonga and Tanga Loa	21:54

== 2018 ==
The 2018 tournament saw a change to a single block and a decrease in teams. From the previous year's 16, 14 teams were competing in the 2018 league. Los Ingobernables de Japon once again one (the 4th team to do so), defeating champs G.O.D. in the final and again at Wrestle Kingdom 13 (in a triple threat match also involving The Young Bucks).

Final standings
Tama Tonga and Tanga Loa	20
Sanada and Evil	20
Tomohiro Ishii and Toru Yano	18
Lance Archer and Davey Boy Smith, Jr.	18
Michael Elgin and Jeff Cobb	16
Zack Sabre Jr. and Taichi	16
Juice Robinson and David Finlay	16
Beretta and Chuckie T.	14
Minoru Suzuki and Takashi Iizuka	10
Hangman Page and Yujiro Takahashi	10
Hiroyoshi Tenzan and Satoshi Kojima	10
Togi Makabe and Toa Henare	8
Yuji Nagata and Manabu Nakanishi	6
Ayato Yoshida and Shota Umino	0

Results	Makabe Henare	Tenzan Kojima	Nagata Nakanishi	Yoshida Umino	Robinson Finlay	Elgin Cobb	Ishii Yano	Beretta Chuckie	Page Takahashi	Tonga Loa	Suzuki Iizuka	Archer Smith	Sabre Taichi	Sanada Evil
Makabe Henare	—	Tenzan; Kojima (9:58)	Makabe; Henare (10:05)	Makabe; Henare (8:04)	Robinson; Finlay (10:44)	Elgin; Cobb (11:37)	Ishii; Yano (9:33)	Makabe; Henare (11:16)	Page; Takahashi (11:08)	Tonga; Loa (12:11)	Makabe; Henare (11:44)	Archer; Smith (10:06)	Sabre; Taichi (11:38)	Sanada; Evil (12:21)
Tenzan Kojima	Tenzan; Kojima (9:58)	—	Nagata; Nakanishi (12:11)	Tenzan; Kojima (11:46)	Robinson; Finlay (8:07)	Elgin; Cobb (12:18)	Ishii; Yano (10:56)	Beretta; Chuckie (11:20)	Page; Takahashi (10:03)	Tenzan; Kojima (11:13)	Tenzan; Kojima (08:54)	Tenzan; Kojima (10:55)	Sabre; Taichi (10:30)	Sanada; Evil (12:00)
Nagata Nakanishi	Makabe; Henare (10:05)	Nagata; Nakanishi (12:11)	—	Nagata; Nakanishi (08:12)	Robinson; Finlay (9:14)	Elgin; Cobb (8:58)	Ishii; Yano (8:28)	Beretta; Chuckie (7:20)	Nagata; Nakanishi (8:15)	Tonga; Loa (9:27)	Suzuki; Iizuka (09:28)	Archer; Smith (8:21)	Sabre; Taichi (9:21)	Sanada; Evil (9:00)
Yoshida Umino	Makabe; Henare (8:04)	Tenzan; Kojima (11:46)	Nagata; Nakanishi (08:12)	—	Robinson; Finlay (8:59)	Elgin; Cobb (7:59)	Ishii; Yano (7:47)	Beretta; Chuckie (8:32)	Page; Takahashi (7:53)	Tonga; Loa (7:52)	Suzuki; Iizuka (9:05)	Archer; Smith (4:12)	Sabre; Taichi (8:39)	Sanada; Evil (8:58)
Robinson Finlay	Robinson; Finlay (10:44)	Robinson; Finlay (8:07)	Robinson; Finlay (9:14)	Robinson; Finlay (08:59)	—	Robinson; Finlay (11:32)	Ishii; Yano (11:43)	Robinson; Finlay (09:54)	Robinson; Finlay (7:14)	Tonga; Loa (12:58)	Suzuki; Iizuka (11:17)	Archer; Smith (8:26)	Sabre; Taichi (9:22)	Robinson; Finlay (11:15)
Elgin Cobb	Elgin; Cobb (11:37)	Elgin; Cobb (12:18)	Elgin; Cobb (8:58)	Elgin; Cobb (7:59)	Robinson; Finlay (11:32)	—	Ishii; Yano (13:58)	Elgin; Cobb (11:48)	Page; Takahashi (11:18)	Elgin; Cobb (13:32)	Elgin; Cobb (11:37)	Archer; Smith (11:10)	Elgin; Cobb (12:04)	Sanada; Evil (17:40)
Ishii Yano	Ishii; Yano (9:33)	Ishii; Yano (10:56)	Ishii; Yano (8:28)	Ishii; Yano (7:47)	Ishii; Yano (11:43)	Ishii; Yano (13:58)	—	Beretta; Chuckie (8:50)	Ishii; Yano (9:35)	Tonga; Loa (13:48)	Ishii; Yano (10:24)	Ishii; Yano (13:53)	Sabre; Taichi (16:28)	Sanada; Evil (14:20)
Beretta Chuckie	Makabe; Henare (11:16)	Beretta; Chuckie (11:20)	Beretta; Chuckie (7:20)	Beretta; Chuckie (8:32)	Robinson; Finlay (08:59)	Elgin; Cobb (11:48)	Beretta; Chuckie (8:50)	—	Beretta; Chuckie (10:26)	Beretta; Chuckie (17:03)	Suzuki; Iizuka (10:20)	Archer; Smith (11:03)	Beretta; Chuckie (15:10)	Sanada; Evil (12:37)
Page Takahashi	Page; Takahashi (11:08)	Page; Takahashi (10:03)	Nagata; Nakanishi (8:15)	Page; Takahashi (7:53)	Robinson; Finlay (7:14)	Page; Takahashi (11:18)	Ishii; Yano (9:35)	Beretta; Chuckie (10:26)	—	Tonga; Loa (10:57)	Suzuki; Iizuka (10:42)	Archer; Smith (10:41)	Page; Takahashi (15:08)	Sanada; Evil (13:40)
Tonga Loa	Tonga; Loa (12:11)	Tenzan; Kojima (11:13)	Tonga; Loa (9:27)	Tonga; Loa (7:52)	Tonga; Loa (12:58)	Cobb; Elgin (13:32)	Tonga; Loa (13:48)	Beretta; Chuckie (17:03)	Tonga; Loa (10:57)	—	Tonga; Loa (9:46)	Tonga; Loa (11:24)	Tonga; Loa (9:43)	Tonga; Loa (17:21)
Suzuki Iizuka	Makabe; Henare (11:44)	Tenzan; Kojima (08:54)	Suzuki; Iizuka (9:28)	Suzuki; Iizuka (9:05)	Suzuki; Iizuka (11:17)	Elgin; Cobb (11:37)	Ishii; Yano (10:24)	Suzuki; Iizuka (10:20)	Suzuki; Iizuka (10:42)	Tonga; Loa (9:46)	—	Archer; Smith (11:22)	Sabre; Taichi (14:18)	Sanada; Evil (10:53)
Archer Smith	Archer; Smith (10:06)	Tenzan; Kojima (10:55)	Archer; Smith (8:21)	Archer; Smith (4:12)	Archer; Smith (8:26)	Archer; Smith (11:10)	Ishii; Yano (13:53)	Archer; Smith (11:03)	Archer; Smith (10:41)	Tonga; Loa (11:24)	Archer; Smith (11:22)	—	Archer; Smith (11:01)	Sanada; Evil (12:50)
Sabre Taichi	Sabre; Taichi (11:38)	Sabre; Taichi (10:30)	Sabre; Taichi (9:21)	Sabre; Taichi (8:39)	Sabre; Taichi (9:22)	Elgin; Cobb (12:04)	Sabre; Taichi (16:28)	Beretta; Chuckie (15:10)	Page; Takahashi (15:08)	Tonga; Loa (9:43)	Sabre; Taichi (14:18)	Archer; Smith (11:01)	—	Sabre; Taichi (16:56)
Sanada Evil	Sanada; Evil (12:21)	Sanada; Evil (12:00)	Sanada; Evil (9:00)	Sanada; Evil (8:58)	Robinson; Finlay (11:15)	Sanada; Evil (17:40)	Sanada; Evil (14:20)	Sanada; Evil (12:37)	Sanada; Evil (13:40)	Tonga; Loa (17:21)	Sanada; Evil (10:53)	Sanada; Evil (12:50)	Sabre; Taichi (16:56)	—

Final
1	Tama Tonga and Tanga Loa	Pin
2	Sanada and Evil	27:01

== 2019 ==
In 2019, the World Tag League sees 16 teams competing in a single block, with the first-placed team being declared the winner. The tournament winners FinJuice advanced to an IWGP Tag Team Championship match at Wrestle Kingdom 14, where they successfully defeated G.O.D..

Final standings
Juice Robinson and David Finlay	26
Evil and Sanada	26
Tama Tonga and Tanga Loa	24
Tomohiro Ishii and Yoshi-Hashi	22
Zack Sabre Jr and Taichi	18
Minoru Suzuki and Lance Archer	18
Toru Yano and Colt Cabana	18
Kenta and Yujiro Takahashi	16
Jeff Cobb and Mikey Nicholls	16
Shingo Takagi and Terrible	12
Bad Luck Fale and Chase Owens	12
Hiroyoshi Tenzan and Satoshi Kojima	8
Togi Makabe and Tomoaki Honma	8
Hirooki Goto and Karl Fredericks	6
Hiroshi Tanahashi and Toa Henare	6
Yuji Nagata and Manabu Nakanishi	4

Current Standings	Tama Tanga	Evil Sanada	Ishii Yoshi-Hashi	Yano Cabana	Cobb Nicholls	Sabre Taichi	Robinson Finlay	Makabe Honma	Suzuki Archer	Kenta Yujiro	Tenzan Kojima	Tanahashi Henare	Nagata Nakanishi	Goto Fredericks	Fale Owens	Takagi Terrible
Tama Tanga	—	Evil; Sanada (13:40)	Ishii; Yoshi-Hashi (16:43)	Yano; Cabana (10:10)	Tama; Tanga (14:47)	Tama; Tanga (11:31)	Tama; Tanga (14:01)	Tama; Tanga (13:47)	Tama; Tanga (14:31)	Tama; Tanga (9:00)	Tama; Tanga (14:50)	Tama; Tanga (11:17)	Tama; Tanga (8:49)	Tama; Tanga (8:22)	Tama; Tanga (10:57)	Tama; Tanga (10:30)
Evil Sanada	Evil; Sanada (13:40)	—	Evil; Sanada (18:28)	Yano; Cabana (13:32)	Evil; Sanada (13:06)	Evil; Sanada (17:52)	Robinson; Finlay (24:01)	Evil; Sanada (11:11)	Evil; Sanada (12:58)	Evil; Sanada (12:20)	Evil; Sanada (11:33)	Evil; Sanada (10:55)	Evil; Sanada (10:31)	Evil; Sanada (11:30)	Evil; Sanada (12:10)	Evil; Sanada (12:26)
Ishii Yoshi-Hashi	Ishii; Yoshi-Hashi (16:43)	Evil; Sanada (18:28)	—	Yano; Cabana (10:02)	Ishii; Yoshi-Hashi (12:30)	Ishii; Yoshi-Hashi (11:48)	Robinson; Finlay (14:01)	Ishii; Yoshi-Hashi (12:55)	Ishii; Yoshi-Hashi (17:45)	Ishii; Yoshi-Hashi (12:46)	Ishii; Yoshi-Hashi (11:09)	Ishii; Yoshi-Hashi (12:48)	Ishii; Yoshi-Hashi (10:01)	Ishii; Yoshi-Hashi (12:51)	Fale; Owens (10:17)	Ishii; Yoshi-Hashi (12:34)
Yano Cabana	Yano; Cabana (10:10)	Yano; Cabana (13:32)	Yano; Cabana (10:02)	—	Cobb; Nicholls (8:22)	Sabre; Taichi (10:00)	Robinson; Finlay (8:42)	Makabe; Honma (8:12)	Yano; Cabana (10:44)	Kenta; Yujiro (10:04)	Tenzan; Kojima (9:08)	Yano; Cabana (10:08)	Yano; Cabana (10:33)	Yano; Cabana (8:08)	Yano; Cabana (9:56)	Yano; Cabana (9:15)
Cobb Nicholls	Tama; Tanga (14:47)	Evil; Sanada (13:06)	Ishii; Yoshi-Hashi (12:30)	Cobb; Nicholls (8:22)	—	Cobb; Nicholls (11:51)	Robinson; Finlay (9:38)	Cobb; Nicholls (9:49)	Suzuki; Archer (9:05)	Kenta; Yujiro (10:08)	Cobb; Nicholls (9:56)	Cobb; Nicholls (10:15)	Cobb; Nicholls (9:56)	Cobb; Nicholls (10:19)	Fale; Owens (11:44)	Cobb; Nicholls (9:31)
Sabre Taichi	Tama; Tanga (11:31)	Evil; Sanada (17:52)	Ishii; Yoshi-Hashi (11:48)	Sabre; Taichi (10:00)	Cobb; Nicholls (11:51)	—	Sabre; Taichi (17:04)	Sabre; Taichi (10:23)	Sabre; Taichi (14:50)	Kenta; Yujiro (11:10)	Sabre; Taichi (9:57)	Sabre; Taichi (13:36)	Sabre; Taichi (9:27)	Sabre; Taichi (10:43)	Sabre; Taichi (8:44)	Takagi; Terrible (15:28)
Robinson Finlay	Tama; Tanga (14:01)	Robinson; Finlay (24:01)	Robinson; Finlay (14:01)	Robinson; Finlay (8:42)	Robinson; Finlay (9:38)	Sabre; Taichi (17:04)	—	Robinson; Finlay (11:49)	Robinson; Finlay (13:46)	Robinson; Finlay (9:08)	Robinson; Finlay (11:10)	Robinson; Finlay (11:31)	Robinson; Finlay (9:18)	Robinson; Finlay (11:18)	Robinson; Finlay (9:48)	Robinson; Finlay (8:07)
Makabe Honma	Tama; Tanga (13:47)	Evil; Sanada (11:11)	Ishii; Yoshi-Hashi (12:55)	Makabe; Honma (8:12)	Cobb; Nicholls (9:49)	Sabre; Taichi (10:23)	Robinson; Finlay (11:49)	—	Suzuki; Archer (12:27)	Kenta; Yujiro (11:33)	Tenzan; Kojima (11:37)	Tanahashi; Henare (12:01)	Makabe; Honma (9:45)	Makabe; Honma (10:43)	Fale; Owens (9:45)	Makabe; Honma (9:57)
Suzuki Archer	Tama; Tanga (14:31)	Evil; Sanada (12:58)	Ishii; Yoshi-Hashi (17:45)	Yano; Cabana (10:44)	Suzuki; Archer (9:05)	Sabre; Taichi (14:50)	Robinson; Finlay (13:46)	Suzuki; Archer (12:27)	—	Suzuki; Archer (11:24)	Suzuki; Archer (12:13)	Suzuki; Archer (12:34)	Suzuki; Archer (9:47)	Suzuki; Archer (10:29)	Suzuki; Archer (9:03)	Suzuki; Archer (11:12)
Kenta Yujiro	Tama; Tanga (9:00)	Evil; Sanada (12:20)	Ishii; Yoshi-Hashi (12:46)	Kenta; Yujiro (10:04)	Kenta; Yujiro (10:08)	Kenta; Yujiro (11:10)	Robinson; Finlay (9:08)	Kenta; Yujiro (11:33)	Suzuki; Archer (11:24)	—	Kenta; Yujiro (10:32)	Kenta; Yujiro (13:17)	Kenta; Yujiro (10:41)	Goto; Fredericks (11:38)	Kenta; Yujiro (7:08)	Takagi; Terrible (10:14)
Tenzan Kojima	Tama; Tanga (14:50)	Evil; Sanada (11:33)	Ishii; Yoshi-Hashi (11:09)	Tenzan; Kojima (9:08)	Cobb; Nicholls (9:56)	Sabre; Taichi (9:57)	Robinson; Finlay (11:10)	Tenzan; Kojima (11:37)	Suzuki; Archer (12:13)	Kenta; Yujiro (10:32)	—	Tenzan; Kojima (10:43)	Nagata; Nakanishi (9:49)	Goto; Fredericks (11:39)	Fale; Owens (9:22)	Tenzan; Kojima (10:16)
Tanahashi Henare	Tama; Tanga (11:17)	Evil; Sanada (10:55)	Ishii; Yoshi-Hashi (12:48)	Yano; Cabana (10:08)	Cobb; Nicholls (10:15)	Sabre; Taichi (13:36)	Robinson; Finlay (11:31)	Tanahashi; Henare (12:01)	Suzuki; Archer (12:34)	Kenta; Yujiro (13:17)	Tenzan; Kojima (10:43)	—	Tanahashi; Henare (10:37)	Tanahashi; Henare (10:15)	Fale; Owens (10:20)	Takagi; Terrible (13:04)
Nagata Nakanishi	Tama; Tanga (8:49)	Evil; Sanada (10:31)	Ishii; Yoshi-Hashi (10:01)	Yano; Cabana (10:33)	Cobb; Nicholls (9:56)	Sabre; Taichi (9:27)	Robinson; Finlay (9:18)	Makabe; Honma (9:45)	Suzuki; Archer (9:47)	Kenta; Yujiro (10:41)	Nagata; Nakanishi (9:49)	Tanahashi; Henare (10:37)	—	Nagata; Nakanishi (11:27)	Fale; Owens (8:10)	Takagi; Terrible (9:56)
Goto Fredericks	Tama; Tanga (8:22)	Evil; Sanada (11:30)	Ishii; Yoshi-Hashi (12:51)	Yano; Cabana (8:08)	Cobb; Nicholls (10:19)	Sabre; Taichi (10:43)	Robinson; Finlay (11:18)	Makabe; Honma (10:43)	Suzuki; Archer (10:29)	Goto; Fredericks (11:38)	Goto; Fredericks (11:39)	Tanahashi; Henare (10:15)	Nagata; Nakanishi (11:27)	—	Goto; Fredericks (9:30)	Takagi; Terrible (10:39)
Fale Owens	Tama; Tanga (10:57)	Evil; Sanada (12:10)	Fale; Owens (10:17)	Yano; Cabana (9:56)	Fale; Owens (11:44)	Sabre; Taichi (8:44)	Robinson; Finlay (9:48)	Fale; Owens (9:45)	Suzuki; Archer (9:03)	Kenta; Yujiro (7:08)	Fale; Owens (9:22)	Fale; Owens (10:20)	Fale; Owens (8:10)	Goto; Fredericks (9:30)	—	Takagi; Terrible (9:28)
Takagi Terrible	Tama; Tanga (10:30)	Evil; Sanada (12:26)	Ishii; Yoshi-Hashi (12:34)	Yano; Cabana (9:15)	Cobb; Nicholls (9:31)	Takagi; Terrible (15:28)	Robinson; Finlay (8:07)	Makabe; Honma (9:57)	Suzuki; Archer (11:12)	Takagi; Terrible (10:14)	Tenzan; Kojima (10:16)	Takagi; Terrible (13:04)	Takagi; Terrible (9:56)	Takagi; Terrible (10:39)	Takagi; Terrible (9:28)	—

== 2020 ==
The 2020 World Tag League took place in tandem with the 2020 Best of the Super Juniors from November 15 to December 11. The World Tag League sees 10 teams competing in a single block, with the top two teams facing in the finals. After reaching the final for 3 straight years previously, G.O.D. finally won the tournament and went on to defeat Dangerous Tekkers (Taichi and Zack Sabre Jr.) for the IWGP Tag Team Championship at Wrestle Kingdom 15.

Final standings
Juice Robinson and David Finlay	12
Tama Tonga and Tanga Loa	12
Taichi and Zack Sabre Jr.	12
Shingo Takagi and Sanada	10
Tomohiro Ishii and Toru Yano	10
Hirooki Goto and Yoshi-Hashi	10
Great-O-Khan and Jeff Cobb	10
Bad Luck Fale and Chase Owens	6
Evil and Yujiro Takahashi	6
Hiroshi Tanahashi and Toa Henare	2

Results	Robinson Finlay	Evil Takahashi	Tonga Loa	Ishii Yano	Taichi Sabre	Goto Yoshi-Hashi	Takagi Sanada	Fale Owens	Khan Cobb	Tanahashi Henare
Robinson Finlay	—	Evil; Takahashi (12:11)	Robinson; Finlay (16:42)	Robinson; Finlay (11:20)	Robinson; Finlay (21:32)	Robinson; Finlay (15:50)	Robinson; Finlay (15:47)	Fale; Owens (9:03)	Khan; Cobb (15:15)	Robinson; Finlay (11:18)
Evil Takahashi	Evil; Takahashi (12:11)	—	Tonga; Loa (8:36)	Evil; Takahashi (11:16)	Taichi; Sabre (13:58)	Goto; Yoshi-Hashi (13:03)	Evil; Takahashi (12:20)	Fale; Owens (3:33)	Khan; Cobb (13:02)	Tanahashi; Henare (13:03)
Tonga Loa	Robinson; Finlay (16:42)	Tonga; Loa (8:36)	—	Ishii; Yano (12:10)	Tonga; Loa (10:07)	Goto; Yoshi-Hashi (14:28)	Tonga; Loa (15:28)	Tonga; Loa (18:51)	Tonga; Loa (15:53)	Tonga; Loa (3:55)
Ishii Yano	Robinson; Finlay (11:20)	Evil; Takahashi (11:16)	Ishii; Yano (12:10)	—	Taichi; Sabre (10:36)	Ishii; Yano (15:08)	Takagi; Sanada (12:24)	Ishii; Yano (5:35)	Ishii; Yano (13:29)	Ishii; Yano (13:43)
Taichi Sabre	Robinson; Finlay (21:32)	Taichi; Sabre (13:58)	Tonga; Loa (18:51)	Taichi; Sabre (10:36)	—	Taichi; Sabre (10:29)	Takagi; Sanada (20:36)	Taichi; Sabre (7:32)	Taichi; Sabre (14:50)	Taichi; Sabre (19:37)
Goto Yoshi-Hashi	Robinson; Finlay (15:50)	Goto; Yoshi-Hashi (13:03)	Goto; Yoshi-Hashi (14:28)	Ishii; Yano (15:08)	Taichi; Sabre (10:29)	—	Takagi; Sanada (17:20)	Goto; Yoshi-Hashi (8:03)	Goto; Yoshi-Hashi (13:41)	Goto; Yoshi-Hashi (12:39)
Takagi Sanada	Robinson; Finlay (15:47)	Evil; Takahashi (12:20)	Tonga; Loa (15:28)	Takagi; Sanada (12:24)	Takagi; Sanada (20:36)	Takagi; Sanada (17:20)	—	Takagi; Sanada (9:45)	Khan; Cobb (11:46)	Takagi; Sanada (19:25)
Fale Owens	Fale; Owens (9:03)	Fale; Owens (3:33)	Tonga; Loa (10:07)	Ishii; Yano (5:35)	Taichi; Sabre (7:32)	Goto; Yoshi-Hashi (8:03)	Takagi; Sanada (9:45)	—	Khan; Cobb (6:47)	Fale; Owens (10:35)
Khan Cobb	Khan; Cobb (15:15)	Khan; Cobb (13:02)	Tonga; Loa (15:53)	Ishii; Yano (13:29)	Taichi; Sabre (14:50)	Goto; Yoshi-Hashi (13:41)	Khan; Cobb (11:46)	Khan; Cobb (6:47)	—	Khan; Cobb (2:28)
Tanahashi Henare	Robinson; Finlay (11:18)	Tanahashi; Henare (13:03)	Tonga; Loa (3:55)	Ishii; Yano (13:43)	Taichi; Sabre (19:37)	Goto; Yoshi-Hashi (12:39)	Takagi; Sanada (19:25)	Fale; Owens (10:35)	Khan; Cobb (2:28)	—

Final
1	Juice Robinson and David Finlay	Pin
2	Tama Tonga and Tanga Loa	22:15

== 2021 ==
The 2021 World Tag League will take place in tandem with the 2021 Best of the Super Juniors from November 13 to December 15. The World Tag League sees 12 teams competing in a single block, with the top two teams facing in the finals. Tournament winners Bishamon advanced to an IWGP Tag Team Championship match at Wrestle Kingdom 16, where they defeated Dangerous Tekkers.

Final standings
Hirooki Goto and Yoshi-Hashi	18
Evil and Yujiro Takahashi	16
Taichi and Zack Sabre Jr.	16
Tetsuya Naito and Sanada	16
Tama Tonga and Tanga Loa	14
Hiroshi Tanahashi and Toru Yano	14
Great-O-Khan and Aaron Henare	14
Bad Luck Fale and Chase Owens	12
Hiroyoshi Tenzan and Satoshi Kojima	6
Togi Makabe and Tomoaki Honma	4
Yuji Nagata and Tiger Mask IV	2
Minoru Suzuki and Taka Michinoku	0

Results	Tonga Loa	Taichi Sabre	Makabe Honma	Kojima Tenzan	Goto Hashi	Evil Takahashi	Fale Owens	Naito Sanada	Tanahashi Yano	O-Khan Henare	Nagata Tiger	Suzuki Michinoku
Tonga Loa	—N/a	Taichi; Sabre (17:41)	Tonga; Loa (14:00)	Tonga; Loa (12:56)	Goto; Hashi (20:02)	Evil; Takahashi (11:15)	Tonga; Loa (11:28)	Naito; Sanada (18:30)	Tonga; Loa (14:47)	Tonga; Loa (13:31)	Tonga; Loa (7:01)	Tonga; Loa (9:52)
Taichi Sabre	Taichi; Sabre (17:41)	—N/a	Taichi; Sabre (13:39)	Taichi; Sabre (16:34)	Goto; Hashi (24:44)	Evil; Takahashi (17:10)	Taichi; Sabre (18:32)	Taichi; Sabre (29:49)	Taichi; Sabre (11:23)	O-Khan; Henare (19:05)	Taichi; Sabre (11:48)	Taichi; Sabre (18:44)
Makabe Honma	Tonga; Loa (14:00)	Taichi; Sabre (13:39)	—N/a	Kojima; Tenzan (11:39)	Goto; Hashi (10:41)	Evil; Takahashi (11:18)	Fale; Owens (10:34)	Naito; Sanada (13:01)	Tanahashi; Yano (13:01)	O-Khan; Henare (12:17)	Makabe; Honma (9:07)	Makabe; Honma (10:11)
Kojima Tenzan	Tonga; Loa (12:56)	Taichi; Sabre (16:34)	Kojima; Tenzan (11:39)	—N/a	Goto; Hashi (11:16)	Evil; Takahashi (11:24)	Fale; Owens (10:45)	Naito; Sanada (11:32)	Tanahashi; Yano (9:17)	O-Khan; Henare (12:43)	Kojima; Tenzan (10:09)	Kojima; Tenzan (9:27)
Goto Hashi	Goto; Hashi (20:02)	Goto; Hashi (24:44)	Goto; Hashi (10:41)	Goto; Hashi (11:16)	—N/a	Evil; Takahashi (11:20)	Goto; Hashi (11:24)	Naito; Sanada (18:12)	Goto; Hashi (11:24)	Goto; Hashi (19:43)	Goto; Hashi (10:59)	Goto; Hashi (10:09)
Evil Takahashi	Evil; Takahashi (11:15)	Evil; Takahashi (17:10)	Evil; Takahashi (11:18)	Evil; Takahashi (11:24)	Evil; Takahashi (11:20)	—N/a	Fale; Owens (7:53)	Evil; Takahashi (17:46)	Tanahashi; Yano (12:16)	O-Khan; Henare (12:51)	Evil; Takahashi (8:23)	Evil; Takahashi (9:31)
Fale Owens	Tonga; Loa (11:28)	Taichi; Sabre (18:32)	Fale; Owens (10:34)	Fale; Owens (10:45)	Goto; Hashi (11:24)	Fale; Owens (7:53)	—N/a	Naito; Sanada (10:22)	Tanahashi; Yano (9:53)	Fale; Owens (9:13)	Fale; Owens (9:52)	Fale; Owens (9:03)
Naito Sanada	Naito; Sanada (18:30)	Taichi; Sabre (29:49)	Naito; Sanada (13:01)	Naito; Sanada (11:32)	Naito; Sanada (18:12)	EVIL; Takahashi (17:46)	Naito; Sanada (10:22)	—N/a	Naito; Sanada (15:18)	O-Khan; Henare (21:28)	Naito; Sanada (13:56)	Naito; Sanada (11:02)
Tanahashi Yano	Tonga; Loa (14:47)	Taichi; Sabre (11:23)	Tanahashi; Yano (13:01)	Tanahashi; Yano (9:17)	Goto; Hashi (11:24)	Tanahashi; Yano (12:16)	Tanahashi; Yano (9:53)	Naito; Sanada (15:18)	—N/a	Tanahashi; Yano (11:49)	Tanahashi; Yano (8:49)	Tanahashi; Yano (10:37)
O-Khan Henare	Tonga; Loa (13:31)	O-Khan; Henare (19:05)	O-Khan; Henare (12:17)	O-Khan; Henare (12:43)	Goto; Hashi (19:43)	O-Khan; Henare (12:51)	Fale; Owens (9:13)	O-Khan; Henare (21:28)	Tanahashi; Yano (11:49)	—N/a	O-Khan; Henare (10:11)	O-Khan; Henare (10:17)
Nagata Tiger	Tonga; Loa (7:01)	Taichi; Sabre (11:48)	Makabe; Honma (9:07)	Kojima; Tenzan (10:09)	Goto; Hashi (10:59)	Evil; Takahashi (8:23)	Fale; Owens (9:52)	Naito; Sanada (13:56)	Tanahashi; Yano (8:49)	O-Khan; Henare (10:11)	—N/a	Nagata; Tiger (14:46)
Suzuki Michinoku	Tonga; Loa (9:52)	Taichi; Sabre (18:44)	Makabe; Honma (10:11)	Kojima; Tenzan (9:27)	Goto; Hashi (10:09)	Evil; Takahashi (9:31)	Fale; Owens (9:03)	Naito; Sanada (11:02)	Tanahashi; Yano (10:37)	O-Khan; Henare (10:17)	Nagata; Tiger (14:46)	—N/a

Final
1	Hirooki Goto and Yoshi-Hashi	19:58
2	Evil and Yujiro Takahashi	Pin

== 2022 ==
The 2022 World Tag League took place in tandem with the 2022 Super Junior Tag League from November 21 to December 14. The World Tag League sees 10 teams competing in a single block, with the top two teams facing in the finals. Bishamon were the tournament winners once again (the 5th back-to-back winners), and reclaimed the IWGP Tag Team Championship from AEW's FTR at Wrestle Kingdom 17. On December 2, it was announced that Chase Owens would be absent for the remainder of the tournament, following the passing of a family member, leading them to forfeit the remainder of their matches.

Final standings
Kyle Fletcher and Mark Davis	14
Hirooki Goto and Yoshi-Hashi	14
Shane Haste and Mikey Nicholls	12
Tetsuya Naito and Sanada	12
Great-O-Khan and Aaron Henare	10
Minoru Suzuki and Lance Archer	8
Hiroshi Tanahashi and Toru Yano	8
Evil and Yujiro Takahashi	6
Bad Luck Fale and Chase Owens	4
Alex Coughlin and Gabriel Kidd	2

Results	Fletcher Davis	Haste Nicholls	Coughlin Kidd	Goto Hashi	Evil Takahashi	Fale Owens	Naito Sanada	Tanahashi Yano	O-Khan Henare	Suzuki Archer
Fletcher Davis	—N/a	Haste; Nicholls (14:26)	Fletcher; Davis (11:19)	Fletcher; Davis (15:18)	Fletcher; Davis (11:20)	Fletcher; Davis (forfeit)	Naito; Sanada (20:20)	Fletcher; Davis (12:37)	Fletcher; Davis (13:34)	Fletcher; Davis (13:34)
Haste Nicholls	Haste; Nicholls (14:26)	—N/a	Haste; Nicholls (16:07)	Goto; Hashi (14:23)	Haste; Nicholls (8:47)	Haste; Nicholls (forfeit)	Haste; Nicholls (12:01)	Tanahashi; Yano (12:26)	O-Khan; Henare (10:13)	Haste; Nicholls (1:40)
Coughlin Kidd	Fletcher; Davis (11:19)	Haste; Nicholls (16:07)	—N/a	Goto; Hashi (11:36)	Coughlin; Kidd (10:46)	Fale; Owens (10:05)	Naito; Sanada (14:17)	Tanahashi; Yano (4:02)	O-Khan; Henare (9:46)	Suzuki; Archer (9:24)
Goto Hashi	Fletcher; Davis (15:18)	Goto; Hashi (14:23)	Goto; Hashi (11:36)	—N/a	Goto; Hashi (9:12)	Goto; Hashi (forfeit)	Goto; Hashi (21:36)	Tanahashi; Yano (13:44)	Goto; Hashi (13:21)	Goto; Hashi (13:26)
Evil Takahashi	Fletcher; Davis (11:20)	Haste; Nicholls (8:47)	Coughlin; Kidd (10:46)	Goto; Hashi (9:12)	—N/a	Fale; Owens (8:34)	Evil; Takahashi (15:40)	Evil; Takahashi (9:44)	O-Khan; Henare (9:58)	Evil; Takahashi (9:41)
Fale Owens	Fletcher; Davis (forfeit)	Haste; Nicholls (forfeit)	Fale; Owens (10:05)	Goto; Hashi (forfeit)	Fale; Owens (8:34)	—N/a	Naito; Sanada (forfeit)	Tanahashi; Yano (3:35)	O-Khan; Henare (forfeit)	Suzuki; Archer (10:18)
Naito Sanada	Naito; Sanada (20:20)	Haste; Nicholls (12:01)	Naito; Sanada (14:17)	Goto; Hashi (21:36)	Evil; Takahashi (15:40)	Naito; Sanada (forfeit)	—N/a	Naito; Sanada (16:18)	Naito; Sanada (22:45)	Naito; Sanada (15:28)
Tanahashi Yano	Fletcher; Davis (12:37)	Tanahashi; Yano (12:26)	Tanahashi; Yano (4:02)	Tanahashi; Yano (13:44)	Evil; Takahashi (9:44)	Tanahashi; Yano (3:35)	Naito; Sanada (16:18)	—N/a	O-Khan; Henare (10:26)	Suzuki; Archer (12:45)
O-Khan Henare	Fletcher; Davis (13:34)	O-Khan; Henare (10:13)	O-Khan; Henare (9:46)	Goto; Hashi (13:21)	O-Khan; Henare (9:58)	O-Khan; Henare (forfeit)	Naito; Sanada (22:45)	O-Khan; Henare (10:26)	—N/a	Suzuki; Archer (13:34)
Suzuki Archer	Fletcher; Davis (13:34)	Haste; Nicholls (1:40)	Suzuki; Archer (9:24)	Goto; Hashi (13:26)	Evil; Takahashi (9:41)	Suzuki; Archer (10:18)	Naito; Sanada (15:28)	Suzuki; Archer (12:45)	Suzuki; Archer (13:34)	—N/a

Final
1	Kyle Fletcher and Mark Davis	28:22
2	Hirooki Goto and Yoshi-Hashi	Pin

== 2023 ==
The 2023 edition of the World Tag League took place from November 20 to December 10. The tournament returned to block format for the first time since 2017. It featured sixteen competing teams divided across two blocks. The first two placed teams of each block moved to the semifinals and the winners of those matches to the final. The League featured the debut of Mogul Embassy's Bishop Kaun and Toa Liona (collectively known as Gates of Agony), CMLL's Zandokan Jr., Atlantis Jr. and Soberano Jr., Alex Zayne, former Young Lions Yuya Uemura, Yota Tsuji, Ren Narita and Ryohei Oiwa, Guerrillas of Destiny's Hikuleo and El Phantasmo (at the time holders of the Strong Openweight Tag Team Championship), Bullet Club's Rogue Army member Jack Bonza and Pro Wrestling Noah's Kaito Kiyomiya.

The winning team advanced to an IWGP Tag Team Championship match at Wrestle Kingdom 18. Since Bishamon (Hirooki Goto and Yoshi-Hashi) were the reigning champions and the winners of the Tag League (the first 3-time winners in tournament history, let alone in a row) they got the privilege to choose their challengers, which were finalist team the new Guerrillas of Destiny (Hikuleo and El Phantasmo) as their opponents with GoD's Strong Openweight Tag Team Championship also on the line. GoD defeated Bishamon at the January 4th event for both sets of championships.

Final standings
Block A		Block B	
Alex Coughlin and Gabe Kidd	10	Hikuleo and El Phantasmo	10
Shane Haste and Mikey Nicholls	10	Hirooki Goto and Yoshi-Hashi	9
Great-O-Khan and Henare	8	Lance Archer and Alex Zayne	8
Tomohiro Ishii and Toru Yano	8	Taichi and Yuya Uemura	8
Evil and Yujiro Takahashi	6	Atlantis Jr. and Soberano Jr.	7
Shota Umino and Ren Narita	6	Yota Tsuji and Zandokan Jr.	6
Bishop Kaun and Toa Liona	4	Minoru Suzuki and Yuji Nagata	4
Kaito Kiyomiya and Ryohei Oiwa	4	Bad Luck Fale and Jack Bonza	4

Block A	Umino Narita	Ishii Yano	O-Khan Henare	Haste Nicholls	Coughlin Kidd	Evil Takahashi	Kiyomiya Oiwa	Kaun Liona
Umino Narita	—	Ishii; Yano (22:31)	Umino; Narita (24:40)	Haste; Nicholls (20:00)	Coughlin; Kidd (13:18)	Evil; Takahashi (9:38)	Umino; Narita (27:31)	Umino; Narita (10:40)
Ishii Yano	Ishii; Yano (22:31)	—	O-Khan; Henare (13:06)	Ishii; Yano (9:51)	Coughlin; Kidd (12:02)	Evil; Takahashi (9:16)	Ishii; Yano (13:47)	Ishii; Yano (10:13)
O-Khan Henare	Umino; Narita (24:40)	O-Khan; Henare (13:06)	—	Haste; Nicholls (15:15)	Coughlin; Kidd (9:55)	O-Khan; Henare (2:38)	O-Khan; Henare (14:33)	O-Khan; Henare (16:18)
Haste Nicholls	Haste; Nicholls (20:00)	Ishii; Yano (9:51)	Haste; Nicholls (15:15)	—	Coughlin; Kidd (15:50)	Haste; Nicholls (16:27)	Haste; Nicholls (11:38)	Haste; Nicholls (10:52)
Coughlin Kidd	Coughlin; Kidd (13:18)	Coughlin; Kidd (12:02)	Coughlin; Kidd (9:55)	Coughlin; Kidd (15:50)	—	Coughlin; Kidd (14:03)	Kiyomiya; Oiwa (12:03)	Kaun; Liona (8:57)
Evil Takahashi	Evil; Takahashi (9:38)	Evil; Takahashi (9:16)	O-Khan; Henare (2:38)	Haste; Nicholls (16:27)	Coughlin; Kidd (14:03)	—	Kiyomiya; Oiwa (16:14)	Evil; Takahashi (10:54)
Kiyomiya Oiwa	Umino; Narita (27:31)	Ishii; Yano (13:47)	O-Khan; Henare (14:33)	Haste; Nicholls (11:38)	Kiyomiya; Oiwa (12:03)	Kiyomiya; Oiwa (16:14)	—	Kaun; Liona (11:34)
Kaun Liona	Umino; Narita (10:40)	Ishii; Yano (10:13)	O-Khan; Henare (16:18)	Haste; Nicholls (10:52)	Kaun; Liona (8:57)	Evil; Takahashi (10:54)	Kaun; Liona (11:34)	—
Block B	Goto Yoshi-Hashi	Hikuleo Phantasmo	Suzuki Nagata	Taichi Uemura	Tsuji Zandokan	Atlantis Soberano	Archer Zayne	Fale Bonza
Goto Yoshi-Hashi	—	Hikuleo; Phantasmo (20:14)	Goto; Yoshi-Hashi (11:42)	Goto; Yoshi-Hashi (23:42)	Goto; Yoshi-Hashi (16:06)	Draw (30:00)	Archer; Zayne (11:30)	Goto; Yoshi-Hashi (11:14)
Hikuleo Phantasmo	Hikuleo; Phantasmo (20:14)	—	Hikuleo; Phantasmo (11:34)	Taichi; Uemura (20:50)	Tsuji; Zandokan (14:51)	Hikuleo; Phantasmo (16:20)	Hikuleo; Phantasmo (15:15)	Hikuleo; Phantasmo (11:02)
Suzuki Nagata	Goto; Yoshi-Hashi (11:42)	Hikuleo; Phantasmo (11:34)	—	Taichi; Uemura (15:31)	Tsuji; Zandokan (9:45)	Atlantis; Soberano (10:01)	Suzuki; Nagata (10:23)	Suzuki; Nagata (9:43)
Taichi Uemura	Goto; Yoshi-Hashi (23:42)	Taichi; Uemura (20:50)	Taichi; Uemura (15:31)	—	Taichi; Uemura (19:30)	Taichi; Uemura (15:02)	Archer; Zayne (11:54)	Fale; Bonza (11:06)
Tsuji Zandokan	Goto; Yoshi-Hashi (16:06)	Tsuji; Zandokan (14:51)	Tsuji; Zandokan (9:45)	Taichi; Uemura (19:30)	—	Atlantis; Soberano (14:01)	Tsuji; Zandokan (13:16)	Fale; Bonza (8:35)
Atlantis Soberano	Draw (30:00)	Hikuleo; Phantasmo (16:20)	Atlantis; Soberano (10:01)	Taichi; Uemura (15:02)	Atlantis; Soberano (14:01)	—	Archer; Zayne (9:40)	Atlantis; Soberano (9:17)
Archer Zayne	Archer; Zayne (11:30)	Hikuleo; Phantasmo (15:15)	Suzuki; Nagata (10:23)	Archer; Zayne (11:54)	Tsuji; Zandokan (13:16)	Archer; Zayne (9:40)	—	Archer; Zayne (11:15)
Fale Bonza	Goto; Yoshi-Hashi (11:14)	Hikuleo; Phantasmo (11:02)	Suzuki; Nagata (9:43)	Fale; Bonza (11:06)	Fale; Bonza (8:35)	Atlantis; Soberano (9:17)	Archer; Zayne (11:15)	—

Semifinals
A1	Alex Coughlin and Gabe Kidd	Pin
B2	Hirooki Goto and Yoshi-Hashi	20:47
B1	Hikuleo and El Phantasmo	16:44
A2	Shane Haste and Mikey Nicholls	Pin

Final
B2	Hirooki Goto and Yoshi-Hashi	40:30
B1	Hikuleo and El Phantasmo	Pin

== 2024 ==
The 2024 edition of the World Tag League took place from November 19 to December 8. It featured sixteen teams divided across two blocks, with the first-placed teams of each block moving to the final. The league featured the debut of Callum Newman, Hiromu Takahashi, Boltin Oleg, and Bullet Club Rogue Army members Stevie and Tome Filip (collectively known as The Natural Classics).

On December 6, it was announced that Henare suffered an injury on his right knee, forcing him and The Great-O-Khan to forfeit, not only their B Block match against Tetsuya Naito and Hiromu Takahashi, but also their IWGP Tag Team Championships, leaving the January 4 bout and January 5 program with the Young Bucks uncertain. Furthermore, the teams of Toru Yano and Boltin Oleg, and Evil and Ren Narita won their respective matches, resulting that three teams ended up in a 10 points tie. Then an impromptu three-way tag team match to decide the winner of the B Block, that Naito and Takahashi won.

The winning team traditionally earns an IWGP Tag Team Championship match at Wrestle Kingdom. However, due to the situation around the IWGP Tag Team Championship, the Los Ingobernables de Japon team of Tetsuya Naito and Hiromu Takahashi wouldn't have a title match; instead, they faced each other at Wrestle Kingdom 19. Furthermore, they were added to the IWGP Tag Team Championship match at Wrestle Dynasty, which they lost. They would, however, win the championships in a rematch at The New Beginning in Osaka (2025) in February.

Final standings
Block A		Block B	
Gabe Kidd and Sanada	10	Tetsuya Naito and Hiromu Takahashi	10
Hirooki Goto and Yoshi-Hashi	8	Great-O-Khan and Henare	10
Shingo Takagi and Yota Tsuji	8	Toru Yano and Boltin Oleg	10
Jeff Cobb and Callum Newman	6	Evil and Ren Narita	10
Kenta and Chase Owens	6	Shane Haste and Mikey Nicholls	6
Zack Sabre Jr. and Ryohei Oiwa	6	Stevie Filip and Tome Filip	4
Alex Zayne and Ryusuke Taguchi	6	Hiroshi Tanahashi and Jado	4
Shota Umino and Tomoaki Honma	6	Taichi and Taka Michinoku	2

Block A	Goto Yoshi-Hashi	Kenta Owens	Umino Honma	Cobb Newman	Zayne Taguchi	Takagi Tsuji	Sabre Oiwa	Kidd Sanada
Goto Yoshi-Hashi	—	Goto; Yoshi-Hashi (10:28)	Umino; Honma (17:06)	Goto; Yoshi-Hashi (12:16)	Zayne; Taguchi (11:02)	Goto; Yoshi-Hashi (15:40)	Goto; Yoshi-Hashi (23:01)	Kidd; Sanada (18:41)
Kenta Owens	Goto; Yoshi-Hashi (10:28)	—	Kenta; Owens (5:24)	Cobb; Newman (10:32)	Zayne; Taguchi (13:05)	Kenta; Owens (12:58)	Kenta; Owens (18:57)	Kidd; Sanada (3:50)
Umino Honma	Umino; Honma (17:06)	Kenta; Owens (5:24)	—	Cobb; Newman (9:16)	Zayne; Taguchi (14:11)	Umino; Honma (18:40)	Umino; Honma (22:53)	Kidd; Sanada (12:59)
Cobb Newman	Goto; Yoshi-Hashi (12:16)	Cobb; Newman (10:32)	Cobb; Newman (9:16)	—	Cobb; Newman (10:44)	Takagi; Tsuji (17:50)	Sabre; Oiwa (15:11)	Kidd; Sanada (5:27)
Zayne Taguchi	Zayne; Taguchi (11:02)	Zayne; Taguchi (13:05)	Zayne; Taguchi (14:11)	Cobb; Newman (10:44)	—	Takagi; Tsuji (12:23)	Sabre; Oiwa (17:36)	Kidd; Sanada (13:09)
Takagi Tsuji	Goto; Yoshi-Hashi (15:40)	Kenta; Owens (12:58)	Umino; Honma (18:40)	Takagi; Tsuji (17:50)	Takagi; Tsuji (18:40)	—	Takagi; Tsuji (24:18)	Takagi; Tsuji (21:43)
Sabre Oiwa	Goto; Yoshi-Hashi (23:01)	Kenta; Owens (18:57)	Umino; Honma (22:53)	Sabre; Oiwa (15:11)	Sabre; Oiwa (17:36)	Takagi; Tsuji (24:18)	—	Sabre; Oiwa (19:40)
Kidd Sanada	Kidd; Sanada (18:41)	Kidd; Sanada (3:50)	Kidd; Sanada (12:59)	Kidd; Sanada (5:27)	Kidd; Sanada (13:09)	Takagi; Tsuji (21:43)	Sabre; Oiwa (19:40)	—
Block B	O-Khan Henare	Taichi Michinoku	Haste Nicholls	Naito Takahashi	Tanahashi Jado	S. Filip T. Filip	Yano Oleg	Evil Narita
O-Khan Henare	—	Taichi; Michinoku (10:50)	O-Khan; Henare (19:21)	Naito; Takahashi (forfeit)	O-Khan; Henare (15:38)	O-Khan; Henare (10:02)	O-Khan; Henare (10:33)	O-Kahn; Henare (20:34)
Taichi Michinoku	Taichi; Michinoku (10:50)	—	Haste; Nicholls (11:12)	Naito; Takahashi (14:01)	Tanahashi; Jado (20:05)	S. Filip; T. Filip (13:17)	Yano; Oleg (10:57)	Evil; Narita (12:01)
Haste Nicholls	O-Khan; Henare (19:21)	Haste; Nicholls (11:12)	—	Naito; Takahashi (16:12)	Haste; Nicholls (13:35)	Haste; Nicholls (13:19)	Yano; Oleg (10:22)	Evil; Narita (11:50)
Naito Takahashi	Naito; Takahashi (forfeit)	Naito; Takahashi (14:01)	Naito; Takahashi (16:12)	—	Tanahashi; Jado (15:52)	Naito; Takahashi (10:20)	Yano; Oleg (11:20)	Naito; Takahashi (19:23)
Tanahashi Jado	O-Khan; Henare (15:38)	Tanahashi; Jado (20:05)	Haste; Nicholls (13:35)	Tanahashi; Jado (15:52)	—	S. Filip; T. Filip (12:49)	Yano; Oleg (11:25)	Evil; Narita (11:22)
S. Filip T. Filip	O-Khan; Henare (10:02)	S. Filip; T. Filip (13:17)	Haste; Nicholls (13:19)	Naito; Takahashi (10:20)	S. Filip; T. Filip (12:49)	—	Yano; Oleg (9:15)	Evil; Narita (11:05)
Yano Oleg	O-Khan; Henare (10:33)	Yano; Oleg (10:57)	Yano; Oleg (10:22)	Yano; Oleg (11:20)	Yano; Oleg (11:25)	Yano; Oleg (9:15)	—	Evil; Narita (10:58)
Evil Narita	O-Kahn; Henare (20:34)	Evil; Narita (12:01)	Evil; Narita (11:50)	Naito; Takahashi (19:23)	Evil; Narita (11:05)	Evil; Narita (11:22)	Evil; Narita (10:58)	—

B Block Decision
B1	Tetsuya Naito and Hiromu Takahashi	Pin
B2	Toru Yano and Boltin Oleg	17:16
B3	Evil and Ren Narita	–

Final
A1	Gabe Kidd and Sanada	27:12
B1	Tetsuya Naito and Hiromu Takahashi	Pin

== 2025 ==
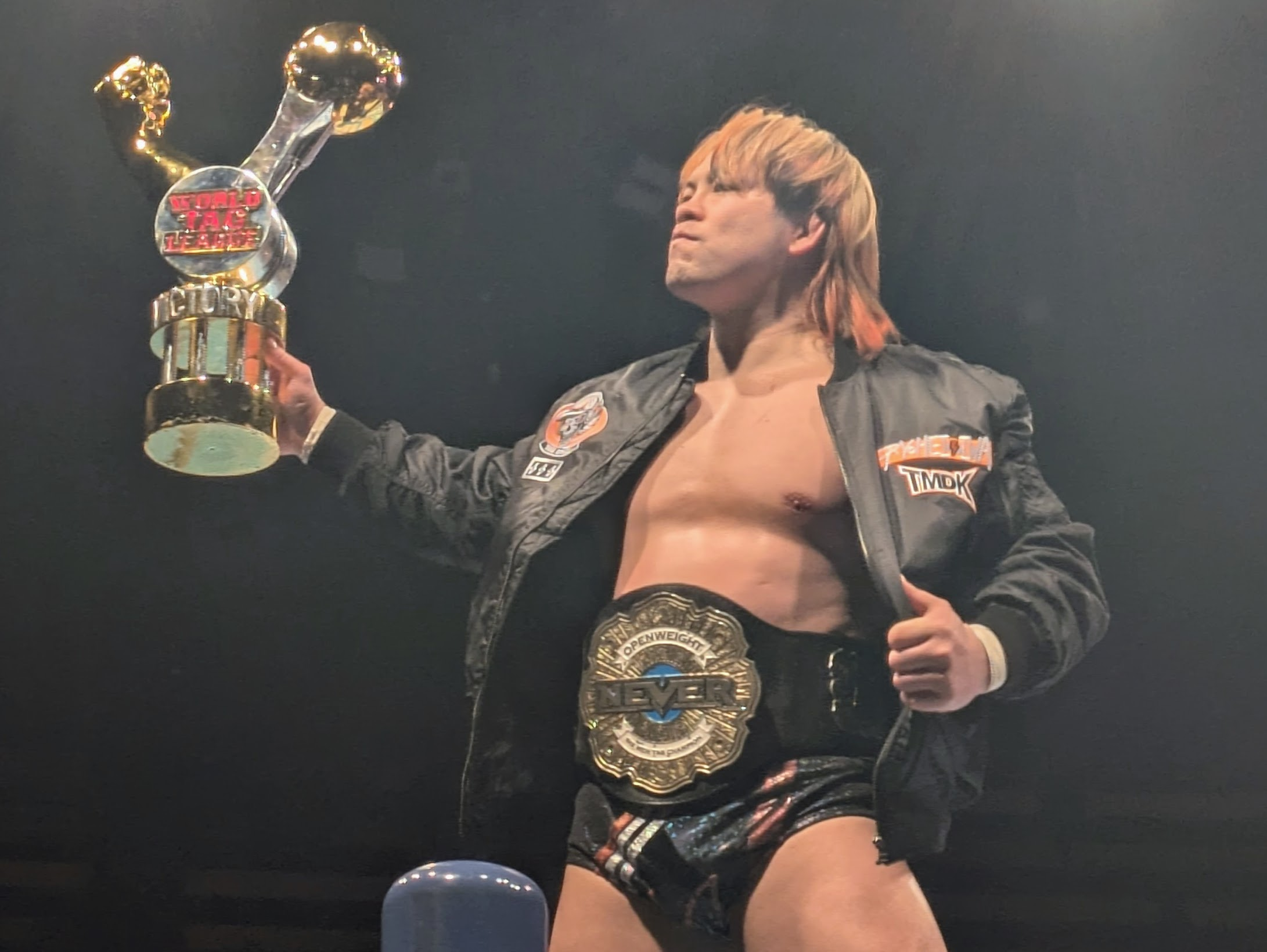
Winners of the 2025 World Tag League, Zack Sabre Jr. and Ryohei Oiwa, shown here with the trophies.

The 2025 edition of the World Tag League took place between November 20 and December 14. It featured sixteen teams divided across two blocks, with the top two teams from each block moving on to the semifinals. The winners of those two matches went on to face each other in the finals. This edition featured the World Tag League debuts of IWGP Tag Team Champions Knock Out Brothers (Yuto-Ice and Oskar), El Desperado, Drilla Moloney, and All Japan Pro-Wrestling guest competitor Shuji Ishikawa. This year was also distinguished by its setup to the formation of Unbound Co. in January, as remnant members of the disbanded Los Ingobernables de Japón & Bullet Club teamed with one another.

The winning team traditionally earns an IWGP Tag Team Championship match at Wrestle Kingdom, but at a December 15 press conference, winners TMDK (Zack Sabre Jr. and Ryohei Oiwa) announced they would instead challenge Knock Out Brothers for the titles the following night at New Year Dash!!.

This was done in recognition of NJPW President Hiroshi Tanahashi having his retirement match at Wrestle Kingdom 20 (although stringent deadlines for its TV Asahi broadcast were also suspected). TMDK failed to dethrone KOB, and failed again in a rematch at Sakura Genesis in April.

Final standings
Block A		Block B	
Hirooki Goto and Yoshi-Hashi	10	Oskar and Yuto-Ice	8
Yota Tsuji and Gabe Kidd	10	Zack Sabre Jr. and Ryohei Oiwa	8
Shingo Takagi and Drilla Moloney	8	Shota Umino and Yuya Uemura	8
Evil and Don Fale	8	Callum Newman and Great-O-Khan	8
Toru Yano and Boltin Oleg	8	Lance Archer and Alex Zayne	6
El Desperado and Shuji Ishikawa	8	Ren Narita and Sanada	6
Taichi and Satoshi Kojima	2	David Finlay and Hiromu Takahashi	6
Yujiro Takahashi and Chase Owens	2	Hiroshi Tanahashi and El Phantasmo	6

Block A	Goto Yoshi-Hashi	Taichi Kojima	Yano Oleg	Desperado Ishikawa	Tsuji Kidd	Takagi Moloney	Evil Fale	Yujiro Owens
Goto Yoshi-Hashi	—	Taichi; Kojima (12:29)	Goto; Yoshi-Hashi (17:01)	Desperado; Ishikawa (10:34)	Goto; Yoshi-Hashi (14:01)	Goto; Yoshi-Hashi (21:28)	Goto; Yoshi-Hashi (9:37)	Goto; Yoshi-Hashi (10:30)
Taichi Kojima	Taichi; Kojima (12:29)	—	Yano; Oleg (11:01)	Desperado; Ishikawa (12:15)	Tsuji; Kidd (10:28)	Takagi; Moloney (21:15)	Evil; Fale (9:35)	Yujiro; Owens (8:59)
Yano Oleg	Goto; Yoshi-Hashi (17:01)	Yano; Oleg (11:01)	—	Yano; Oleg (10:13)	Tsuji; Kidd (16:01)	Takagi; Moloney (14:09)	Yano; Oleg (10:39)	Yano; Oleg (9:00)
Desperado Ishikawa	Desperado; Ishikawa (10:34)	Desperado; Ishikawa (12:15)	Yano; Oleg (10:13)	—	Tsuji; Kidd (17:12)	Desperado; Ishikawa (14:51)	Evil; Fale (9:44)	Desperado; Ishikawa (9:26)
Tsuji Kidd	Goto; Yoshi-Hashi (14:01)	Tsuji; Kidd (10:28)	Tsuji; Kidd (16:01)	Tsuji; Kidd (17:12)	—	Takagi; Moloney (17:00)	Tsuji; Kidd (13:59)	Tsuji; Kidd (9:13)
Takagi Moloney	Goto; Yoshi-Hashi (21:28)	Takagi; Moloney (21:15)	Takagi; Moloney (14:09)	Desperado; Ishikawa (14:51)	Takagi; Moloney (17:00)	—	Evil; Fale (13:16)	Takagi; Moloney (9:56)
Evil Fale	Goto; Yoshi-Hashi (9:34)	Evil; Fale (9:37)	Yano; Oleg (10:39)	Evil; Fale (9:44)	Tsuji; Kidd (13:59)	Evil; Fale (13:16)	—	Evil; Fale (7:09)
Yujiro Owens	Goto; Yoshi-Hashi (10:30)	Yujiro; Owens (8:59)	Yano; Oleg (9:00)	Desperado; Ishikawa (9:26)	Tsuji; Kidd (9:13)	Takagi; Moloney (9:56)	Evil; Fale (7:09)	—
Block B	Oskar Yuto-Ice	Tanahashi Phantasmo	Umino Uemura	Finlay Hiromu	Sabre Oiwa	Newman O-Khan	Narita Sanada	Archer Zayne
Oskar Yuto-Ice	—	Oskar; Yuto-Ice (16:42)	Oskar; Yuto-Ice (21:52)	Finlay; Hiromu (16:16)	Oskar; Yuto-Ice (13:42)	Oskar; Yuto-Ice (14:05)	Narita; Sanada (16:40)	Archer; Zayne (14:03)
Tanahashi Phantasmo	Oskar; Yuto-Ice (16:42)	—	Umino; Uemura (17:18)	Finlay; Hiromu (15:44)	Tanahashi; Phantasmo (22:07)	Newman; O-Khan (12:17)	Tanahashi; Phantasmo (10:26)	Tanahashi; Phantasmo (12:01)
Umino Uemura	Oskar; Yuto-Ice (21:52)	Umino; Uemura (17:18)	—	Umino; Uemura (18:55)	Sabre; Oiwa (23:37)	Newman; O-Khan (15:18)	Umino; Uemura (18:46)	Umino; Uemura (14:11)
Finlay Hiromu	Finlay; Hiromu (16:16)	Finlay; Hiromu (15:44)	Umino; Uemura (18:55)	—	Sabre; Oiwa (15:22)	Finlay; Hiromu (14:39)	Narita; Sanada (14:33)	Archer; Zayne (9:01)
Sabre Oiwa	Oskar; Yuto-Ice (13:42)	Tanahashi; Phantasmo (22:07)	Sabre; Oiwa (23:37)	Sabre; Oiwa (15:22)	—	Sabre; Oiwa (13:03)	Narita; Sanada (14:07)	Sabre; Oiwa (2:31)
Newman O-Khan	Oskar; Yuto-Ice (14:05)	Newman; O-Khan (12:17)	Newman; O-Khan (15:18)	Finlay; Hiromu (14:39)	Sabre; Oiwa (13:03)	—	Newman; O-Khan (11:35)	Newman; O-Khan (8:59)
Narita Sanada	Narita; Sanada (16:40)	Tanahashi; Phantasmo (10:26)	Umino; Uemura (18:46)	Narita; Sanada (14:33)	Narita; Sanada (14:07)	Newman; O-Khan (11:35)	—	Archer; Zayne (9:06)
Archer Zayne	Archer; Zayne (14:03)	Tanahashi; Phantasmo (12:01)	Umino; Uemura (14:11)	Archer; Zayne (9:01)	Sabre; Oiwa (2:31)	Newman; O-Khan (8:59)	Archer; Zayne (9:06)	—

Semifinals
A1	Bishamon (Hirooki Goto and Yoshi-Hashi)	Pin
B2	TMDK (Zack Sabre Jr. and Ryohei Oiwa)	24:10
B1	Knock Out Brothers (Oskar and Yuto-Ice)	Pin
A2	Gabe Kidd and Yota Tsuji	20:34

Final
B2	TMDK (Zack Sabre Jr. and Ryohei Oiwa)	32:37
A2	Gabe Kidd and Yota Tsuji	Pin

== 2026 ==
The 2026 edition of the World Tag League will take place between November 23 and December 13. It will feature sixteen teams divided across two blocks, with the top two teams from each block moving on to the semifinals. The winners of those two matches will go on to face each other in the finals. Teams were originally announced November 5, with Taichi's partner revealed as Zack Sabre Jr. on November 7. Tomohiro Ishii was meant to be Taichi's partner but could not compete due to injury. The winning team traditionally earns an IWGP Tag Team Championship match at Wrestle Kingdom.

Standings
Block A	Block B
Yuto-Ice and Oskar	Hirooki Goto and Yoshi-Hashi
Alex Zayne and Lance Archer	Great-O-Khan and Henare
Yuya Uemura and Yuji Nagata	Shingo Takagi and Drilla Moloney
Aaron Wolf and Boltin Oleg	Don Fale and Chase Owens
Yota Tsuji and Jeff Cobb	Shota Umino and Satoshi Kojima
Ryohei Oiwa and Hartley Jackson	Toru Yano and Togi Makabe
Callum Newman and Jake Lee	Taichi and Zack Sabre Jr.
Sanada and Yujiro Takahashi	Ren Narita and Shun Skywalker

Block A	Yuto-Ice Oskar	Zayne Archer	Uemura Nagata	Wolf Oleg	Tsuji Cobb	Oiwa Jackson	Newman Lee	Sanada Takahashi
Yuto-Ice Oskar	—	11.23	12.2	11.29	12.10	12.8	11.25	12.5
Zayne Archer	11.23	—	12.5	12.8	11.25	11.29	12.2	12.10
Uemura Nagata	12.2	12.5	—	11.25	12.8	12.10	11.23	11.29
Wolf Oleg	11.29	12.8	11.25	—	12.5	12.2	12.10	11.23
Tsuji Cobb	12.10	11.25	12.8	12.5	—	11.23	11.29	12.2
Oiwa Jackson	12.8	11.29	12.10	12.2	11.23	—	12.5	11.25
Newman Lee	11.25	12.2	11.23	12.10	11.29	12.5	—	12.8
Sanada Takahashi	12.5	12.10	11.29	11.23	12.2	11.25	12.8	—
Block B	Goto Yoshi-Hashi	O-Khan Henare	Takagi Moloney	Fale Owens	Umino Kojima	Yano Makabe	Taichi Sabre	Narita Skywalker
Goto Yoshi-Hashi	—	12.6	11.27	12.9	11.28	12.4	12.1	11.24
O-Khan Henare	12.6	—	11.24	12.1	12.4	11.28	11.27	12.9
Takagi Moloney	11.27	11.24	—	12.4	12.9	12.6	11.28	12.1
Fale Owens	12.9	12.1	12.4	—	11.27	11.24	12.6	11.28
Umino Kojima	11.28	12.4	12.9	11.27	—	12.1	11.24	12.6
Yano Makabe	12.4	11.28	12.6	11.24	12.1	—	12.9	11.27
Taichi Sabre	12.1	11.27	11.28	12.6	11.24	12.9	—	12.4
Narita Skywalker	11.24	12.9	12.1	11.28	12.6	11.27	12.4	—

Semifinals
A1
B2
B1
A2

Final

== See also ==
- Global Tag League
- World's Strongest Tag Determination League
- Ultimate Tag League
- New Japan Pro-Wrestling
- Professional wrestling in Japan
- Saikyo Tag League
