= The Mad Dogs =

Professional wrestling tag team

Tag team
- Members: Tatsutoshi Goto; Michiyoshi Ohara
- Name(s): The Mad Dogs; Tatsutoshi Goto and Michiyoshi Ohara
- Billed heights: 1.79 m (5 ft 10 1/2 in)- Goto; 1.77 m (5 ft 9 1/2 in)- Ohara
- Combined billed weight: 200 kg (440 lb)
- Debut: 1994
- Disbanded: 2008

The Mad Dogs were a professional wrestling tag team that consisted of Tatsutoshi Goto and Michiyoshi Ohara. The team competed in New Japan Pro-Wrestling and WAR and were members of several stables including Heisei Ishingun, nWo Japan, and Team 2000.

== History ==
=== Heisei Ishingun (1994–1999) ===
The Mad Dogs began teaming as early as 1994 as both Goto and Ohara were members of Shiro Koshinaka's stable Heisei Ishingun. The team were largely in multi-man tag matches, got no title shots and were left off the 1994 G1 Tag League.

In early 1995, The Mad Dogs began competing in WAR with the rest of Ishingun and on January 8, 1995, The Mad Dogs with Ishingun leader Shiro Koshinaka defeated Hiromichi Fuyuki and Jado and Gedo to win the WAR World Six-Man Tag Team Championship. Four months later on April 30, they lost the titles to Genichiro Tenryu, Animal Hamaguchi, and Koki Kitahara. Following the title loss, the team returned to New Japan where they continued to remain in the midcard wrestling with the rest of Ishingun. In November 1996, The Mad Dogs took part in a one-night tournament but with different partners as Ohara teamed with Akira Nogami while Goto teamed with Akitoshi Saito, as the four of them were still allied with Heisei Ishingun. Goto and Saito would lose in the first round to Kensuke Sasaki and Shinjiro Ohtani while Ohara and Nogami won the tournament defeating Sasaki and Ohtani in the finals, also avenging Goto and Saito in the process.

In 1997, The Mad Dogs began to move up the card with Ohara entering the 1997 G1 Climax but was eliminated in the first round by Masahiro Chono. By the end of the year they briefly teamed with nWo Japan during the nWo TYPHOON tour and, in November, they entered the 1997 Super Grade Tag League. Though they finished last with 1 point, they did get a victory over multi-time IWGP Tag Team Champions: Tatsumi Fujinami and Kengo Kimura.

In 1998, the team remained the midcard as they were left off the 1998 Super Grade Tag League and did not challenge for any titles; they did enter the 1998 G1 Climax but were eliminated in the first round, with Ohara losing to Kensuke Sasaki and Goto losing to Shinya Hashimoto. At Rising the Next Generation on August 8, the team took on the Great Kabuki and Great Muta but were defeated.

=== Team 2000 and break up (1999–2001) ===
In 1999, Heisei Ishingun broke up but the Mad Dogs continued to team. On June 27, The Dogs received their first shot at the IWGP Tag Team Championship against Shiro Koshinaka and Kensuke Sasaki. In their first attempt, Goto and Ohara would emerge victorious after Goto pinned Koshinaka, winning the gold. Two months later at the Jingu Climax on August 28, The Mad Dogs lost the titles to Yuji Nagata and Manabu Nakanishi. In September, Goto and Ohara entered the 1999 G1 Tag League where they finished in 8th place with 6 points.

On February 4, 2000, The Dogs earned a rematch for the IWGP Tag Titles but lost. Four days later on February 8, The Mad Dogs joined Masahiro Chono's Team 2000 stable. After joining, the Dogs spent the next year in the midcard where they once again received no title shots, and by the summer of 2001, the Mad Dogs broke up with Ohara leaving New Japan to focus on Mixed Martial Arts, while Goto would feud with most of New Japan's loyalists and their Young Lions.

=== Reunion and Second Breakup (2003–2008) ===
In early 2003, The Mad Dogs reunited when Ohara returned to New Japan, the two formed a new stable: The Crazy Dogs with Hiro Saito and MMA legend: Enson Inoue. The group spent all of 2003 feuding with the Makai Club where the two sides exchanged victories until the feud ended at Wrestling World 2004 when the Crazy Dogs lost to the Makai Club in an eight-man tag team match. Following the loss, Ohara and Inoue left New Japan. Goto would eventually leave in 2006.

After Goto left New Japan, the Mad Dogs would team up a few more times. Once in 2006 for UWAI Station and twice in 2008 in Kensuke Office before Ohara retired due to injuries.

== Championships and accomplishments ==
- New Japan Pro-Wrestling
  - IWGP Tag Team Championship (1 time)
  - One Night Tag Team Tournament (1996) – Ohara (w/ Akira Nogami)
- Wrestle Association R
  - WAR World Six-Man Tag Team Championship (1 time) – with Shiro Koshinaka
