= NJPW Jingu Climax =

1999 New Japan Pro-Wrestling event

Jingu Climax
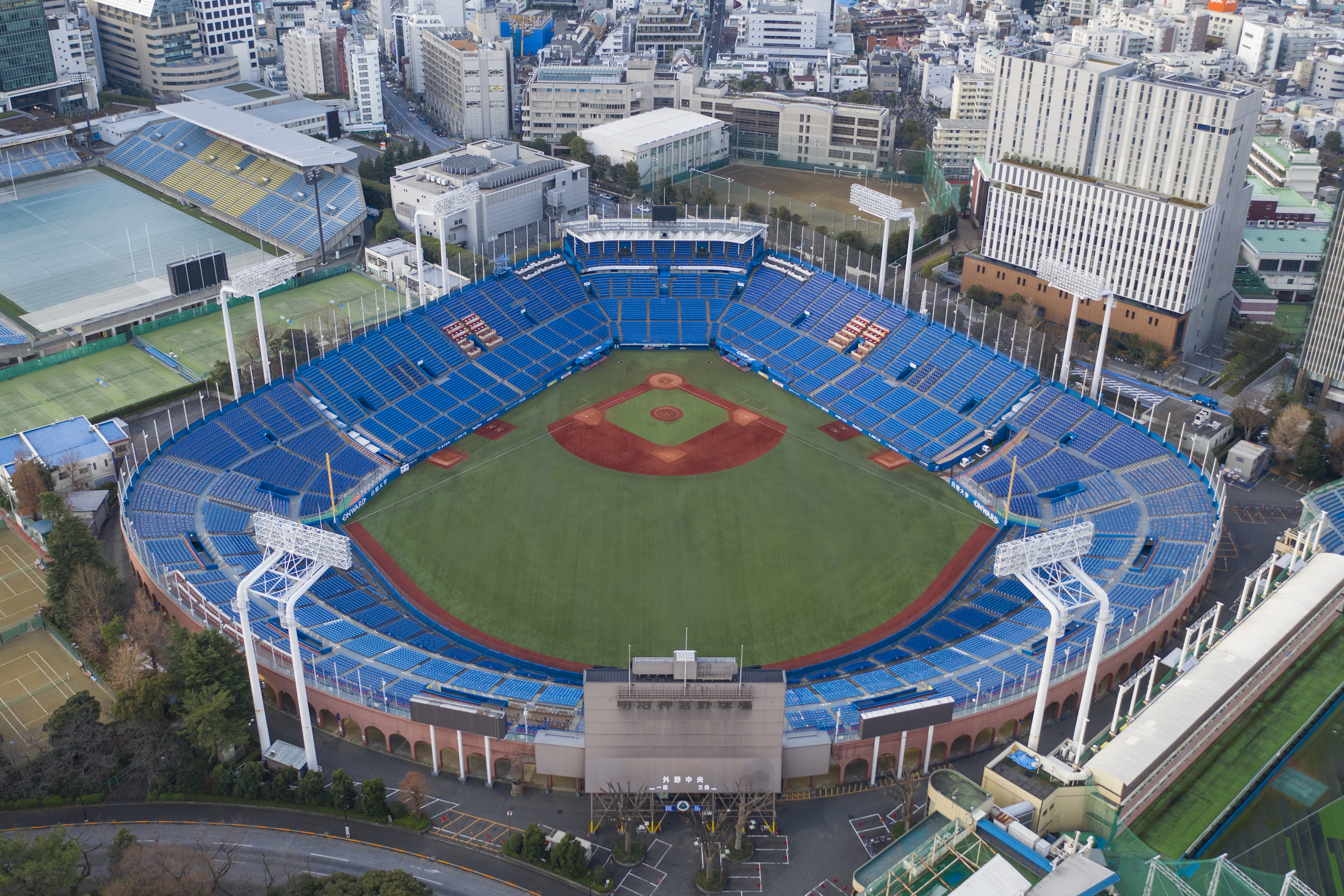
- Meiji Jingu Stadium, the venue of the event
- Promotion: New Japan Pro-Wrestling
- Date: August 28, 1999
- City: Tokyo, Japan
- Venue: Meiji Jingu Stadium
- Attendance: 48,000
- Tagline: Battle of Last Summer

Event chronology
← Previous; Wrestling World 1999	Next → Final Dome

Jingu Climax: Battle of Last Summer (stylized as GIngu CLIMAX～BATTLE OF LAST SUMMER) was a major professional wrestling television special event produced by New Japan Pro-Wrestling (NJPW). It took place on August 28, 1999, at the Meiji Jingu Stadium in Tokyo, Japan and was televised live on TV Asahi.

The main event was marketed as a "dream match", a No Rope Explosive Barbed Wire Barricade Explosive Land Mine Double Hell Deathmatch pitting Keiji Mutoh's alter ego The Great Muta against Atsushi Onita's alter ego The Great Nita. Muta won the match. Other major matches on the card featured Shinya Hashimoto versus Masahiro Chono, The Mad Dogs (Michiyoshi Ohara and Tatsutoshi Goto) defending the IWGP Tag Team Championship against Manabu Nakanishi and Yuji Nagata, Koji Kanemoto defending the IWGP Junior Heavyweight Championship against Kendo Kashin and Shinjiro Otani and Tatsuhito Takaiwa defending the IWGP Junior Heavyweight Tag Team Championship against El Samurai and Jushin Liger.

== Production ==
=== Storylines ===
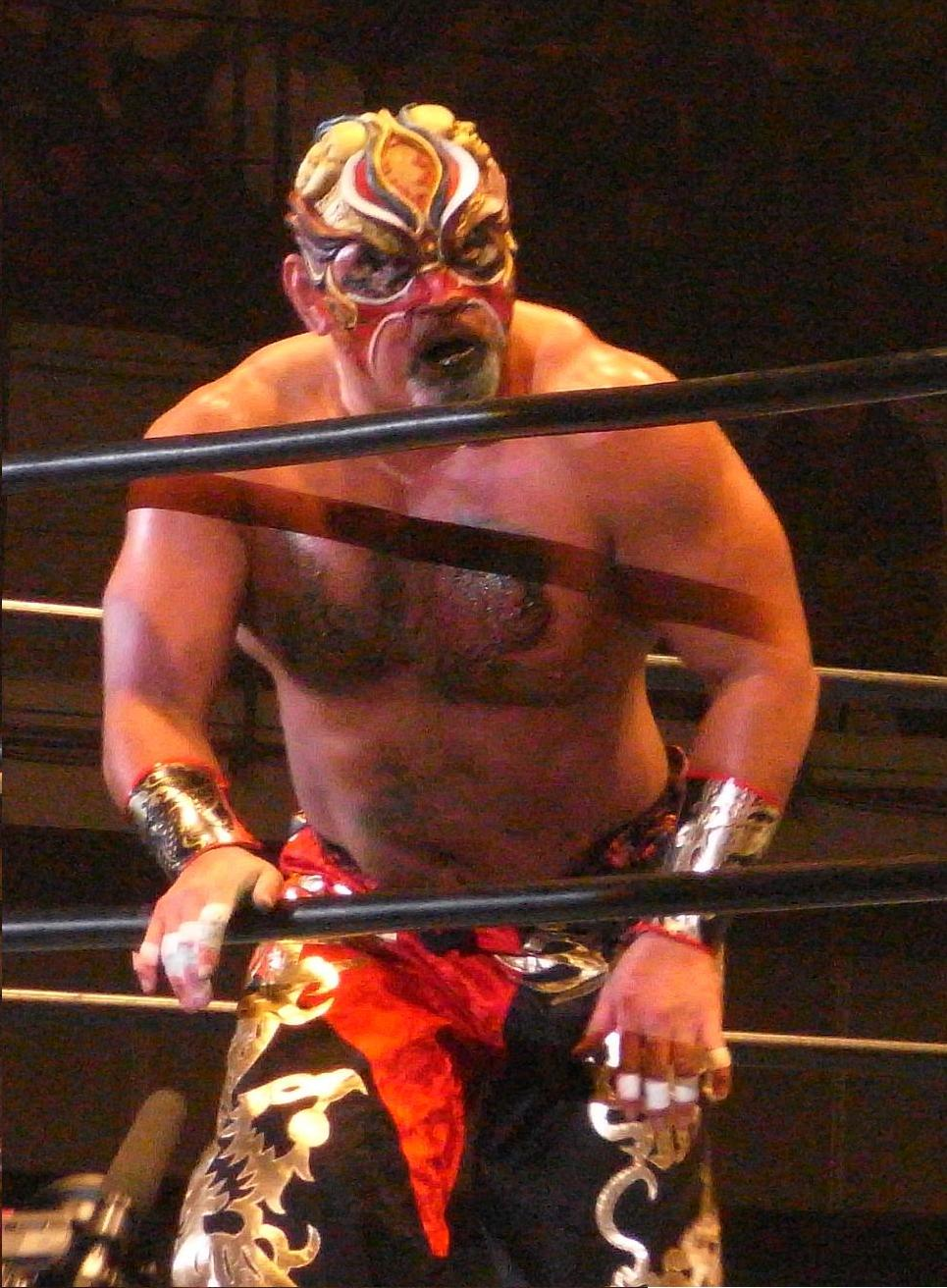
The Great Muta wrestled The Great Nita in the main event of Jingu Climax.

The event was centered around a No Rope Explosive Barbed Wire Barricade Explosive Land Mine Double Hell Deathmatch between Keiji Mutoh's alter ego The Great Muta and Atsushi Onita's alter ego The Great Nita. Mutoh began using the Great Muta character in World Championship Wrestling in 1989 and incorporated the character into NJPW in 1990. With the growing popularity of the Great Muta in Japanese wrestling, several wrestlers began imitating it. Onita imitated the character in Frontier Martial-Arts Wrestling as the "Great Nita" in 1994. Years later, after Onita departed FMW in 1998, he began feuding with Muta under his Great Nita alter ego and claimed to be more sadistic than Muta, setting up a match between the Great Muta and the Great Nita under Onita's deathmatch speciality which he had popularized in his promotion FMW.

On June 8, Kendo Kashin defeated the IWGP Junior Heavyweight Champion Koji Kanemoto in the tournament final to win the 1999 Best of the Super Juniors tournament, thus earning a future title shot against Kanemoto for the Junior Heavyweight Championship. This set up a title match between the two for the Junior Heavyweight Championship at Jingu Climax.

== Event ==
=== Preliminary matches ===
The event kicked off with a singles match between Kazuyuki Fujita and Brian Johnston. Fujita won the match by making Johnston submit to the cross armbreaker.

Next, Shinjiro Otani and Tatsuhito Takaiwa defended the IWGP Junior Heavyweight Tag Team Championship against El Samurai and Jushin Liger in the first championship match of the event. Otani nailed a Spiral Bomb to Liger to retain the titles.

Next, Koji Kanemoto defended the IWGP Junior Heavyweight Championship against Kendo Kashin. Kashin made Kanemoto submit to the cross armbreaker to win the Junior Heavyweight Championship.

Next, nWo Japan members Ten-Koji (Hiroyoshi Tenzan and Satoshi Kojima) took on the team of Shiro Koshinaka and Tatsumi Fujinami. Tenzan hit a kneeling kick to Koshinaka for the win.

The match was followed by the final championship match of the event in which The Mad Dogs (Michiyoshi Ohara and Tatsutoshi Goto) defended the IWGP Tag Team Championship against Manabu Nakanishi and Yuji Nagata. Nagata delivered a Backdrop Hold to Ohara to win the match and the Tag Team Championship.

Later, Don Frye took on Scott Norton. Frye made Norton submit to the rear naked choke for the win.

It was followed by the penultimate match of the event in which Shinya Hashimoto took on Masahiro Chono. Hashimoto passed out in Chono's STF submission hold, forcing the referee to stop the match and award the win to Chono.

=== Main event match ===
The main event was a No Rope Explosive Barbed Wire Barricade Explosive Land Mine Double Hell Deathmatch between Keiji Mutoh's alter ego "The Great Muta" and Atsushi Onita's alter ego "The Great Nita". After a back and forth match, Muta knocked out Nita with a Kama and Nita was unable to answer the referee's ten count, which resulted in Muta getting the win.

== Aftermath ==
On July 26, 2020 New Japan Pro-Wrestling (NJPW) announced their return to the venue after 21 years for the first time in the promotion's history on August 29 being the promotion second outdoor event of the promotion's history.

== Results ==
No.	Results	Stipulations	Times
1	Kazuyuki Fujita defeated Brian Johnston via submission	Singles match	3:55
2	Shinjiro Otani and Tatsuhito Takaiwa (c) defeated El Samurai and Jushin Liger	Tag team match for the IWGP Junior Heavyweight Tag Team Championship	15:00
3	Kendo Kashin defeated Koji Kanemoto (c) via submission	Singles match for the IWGP Junior Heavyweight Championship	14:45
4	nWo Japan (Hiroyoshi Tenzan and Satoshi Kojima) defeated Shiro Koshinaka and Tatsumi Fujinami	Tag team match	8:38
5	Manabu Nakanishi and Yuji Nagata defeated The Mad Dogs (Michiyoshi Ohara and Tatsutoshi Goto) (c)	Tag team match for the IWGP Tag Team Championship	16:01
6	Don Frye defeated Scott Norton via submission	Singles match	7:53
7	Masahiro Chono defeated Shinya Hashimoto via referee stoppage	Singles match	15:45
8	The Great Muta defeated The Great Nita	No Rope Explosive Barbed Wire Barricade Explosive Land Mine Double Hell Deathmatch	13:32
(c) / – the champion(s) heading into the match
