= Michiyoshi Ohara =

Japanese professional wrestler

Michiyoshi Ohara 小原道由
Personal information
- Born: November 15, 1967 (age 58) Matsumoto, Nagano, Japan

Professional wrestling career
- Ring name(s): Michiyoshi Ohara; T2000 Machine #2; Makai #3; Fuji Yamaha
- Billed height: 1.77 m (5 ft 9 1/2 in)
- Billed weight: 105 kg (231 lb)
- Trained by: Animal Hamaguchi; NJPW Dojo
- Debut: June 30, 1990
- Retired: 2008

Michiyoshi Ohara (Japanese: 小原道由, Ohara Michiyoshi) (born November 15, 1967) is a Japanese professional wrestler and mixed martial artist, best known for his work in New Japan Pro-Wrestling (NJPW), where he wrestled from 1990 to 2004, winning the IWGP Tag Team Championship with Tatsutoshi Goto in 1999.

== Professional wrestling career ==
=== New Japan Pro-Wrestling (1990–2004) ===
The former captain of the Kokushikan University judo team, Michiyoshi Ohara debuted for New Japan Pro-Wrestling on June 30, 1990, against Osamu Matsuda. In December 1991, Ohara won the Young Lion Tournament by defeating Koji Kanemoto. In the summer of 1992, he wrestled in Europe for Otto Wanz's Catch Wrestling Association, under the name Fuji Yamaha.

==== Heisei Ishingun (1993–1999) ====
In 1993, he joined Shiro Koshinaka's Heisei Ishingun, acting as one of the group's main members, and upon joining the group, he began partnering with The Great Kabuki, until Tatsutoshi Goto joined the unit later on, where their partnership lasted past Heisei Ishingun's disbandment in 1999. While with the Ishingun, Ohara won the One Night Tag Team Tournament with fellow member Akira Nogami on November 3, 1996, and also had one-off matches for other promotions like WAR, winning the WAR World Six-Man Tag Team Championship with Goto and Shiro Koshinaka in one occasion, and Pro Wrestling Fujiwara Gumi. However at one point, in 1997, Goto and Ohara left the Ishingun and joined the nWo Japan as associates for Masahiro Chono, but they left after a confrontation with Chono and Hiroyoshi Tenzan, joining Heisei Ishingun once again until the end.

==== The Mad Dogs, TEAM 2000 and departure (1999–2001) ====
After Heisei Ishingun's ending, Ohara and Goto remained as The Mad Dogs, being affiliated with Masahiro Chono's newly formed TEAM 2000, feuding with New Japan's loyalists. On June 27, 1999, during Summer Struggle tour, Ohara and Goto defeated their former leader Shiro Koshinaka and Kensuke Sasaki for the IWGP Tag Team Championship after Goto pinned Koshinaka. They held the belts for two months, once successfully defending it against Koshinaka and Kengo Kimura, until dropping it to Yuji Nagata and Manabu Nakanishi on August 28, during the Jingu Climax event. After their loss, they took part in the G1 Tag League of that year, finishing the tournament in 7th place with 6 points, with a notable victory over their leader Chono and his partner Don Frye. The next year, The Dogs would find themselves on the mid-card again, not having any success on title matches or tournaments, and scoring occasional victories over young lion teams. They once again took part in the G1 Tag League tournament, however, not as the Mad Dogs, but as a parody of Super Strong Machine called T2000 Machines, since the group was feuding with the original Strong Machine, so they parodied his gimmick. The T2000 Machines finished last on the tournament with only two points, by scoring a victory over then reigning IWGP Tag Team champions and fellow TEAM 2000 members, Satoshi Kojima and Hiroyoshi Tenzan. On December 10, 2000, Ohara made history on a New Japan Pro-Wrestling show, after losing a match to Kensuke Sasaki in only 6 seconds, in which Ohara ran from his corner towards Sasaki, with the latter intercepting him by hitting a single Lariat, knocking him out, a record that was since broken by Yota Tsuji after he pinned Gedo in 5 seconds with a single Gene Blaster. After some more matches, Ohara left New Japan in July 2001 to venture on Mixed Martial Arts, disbanding with Goto in the process.

==== Return and Crazy Dogs (2003–2004) ====
In early 2003, The Mad Dogs reunited when Ohara returned to New Japan, the two formed a new stable: The Crazy Dogs with Hiro Saito and MMA legend: Enson Inoue. The group spent all of 2003 feuding with the Makai Club and Kantaro Hoshino where the two sides exchanged victories until the feud ended at Wrestling World 2004 when the Crazy Dogs lost to the Makai Club in an eight-man tag team match. Following the loss, Ohara and Inoue left New Japan. Goto would eventually leave in 2006.

=== Freelance (2004–2008) ===
After 14 years with the New Japan, Ohara's contract was not renewed in 2004, and he would venture on freelancing with Kensuke Office, Dradition and Big Mouth Loud. He reunited with Goto as The Mad Dogs for Big Mouth Loud in 2005, before making brief returns to New Japan, as Makai #3 and himself. His last appearance for New Japan occurred on March 6, 2007, teaming with Shiro Koshinaka as Heisei Ishingun for one night, in a losing effort against Riki Choshu and Super Strong Machine. In 2007, he joined Antonio Inoki's new promotion, Inoki Genome Federation. In 2008, he retired due to injuries suffered in a car accident.

== Mixed martial arts career ==
Ohara briefly became a mixed martial artist where he competed in PRIDE Fighting Championships. He had a total of two fights and lost both, his first fight took place against Renzo Gracie on November 3, 2001, at PRIDE 17 where he lost by unanimous decision. His second fight took place just under a year after his first against Kevin Randleman on September 29, 2002, at PRIDE 22, the fight resembled much like the first as he lost by unanimous decision.

== Championships and accomplishments ==
=== Professional wrestling ===
- New Japan Pro-Wrestling

- IWGP Tag Team Championship (1 time) - with Tatsutoshi Goto
- Young Lion Tournament (1991)
- One Night Tag Team Tournament (1996)- with Akira Nogami

- Wrestle Association "R"

- WAR World Six-Man Tag Team Championship (1 Time) - with Shiro Koshinaka & Tatsutoshi Goto

== Mixed martial arts record ==
Professional record breakdown
2 matches	0 wins	2 losses
By decision	0	2

Res.	Record	Opponent	Method	Event	Date	Round	Time	Location	Notes
Loss	0-2	Kevin Randleman	Decision (unanimous)	PRIDE 22	September 29, 2002	3	5:00	Nagoya, Japan	
Loss	0-1	Renzo Gracie	Decision (unanimous)	PRIDE 17	November 3, 2001	3	5:00	Tokyo, Japan	
