= Team 2000 =

Professional wrestling stable

Stable
- Members: Masahiro Chono nWo Sting/Super J Michael Wallstreet; AKIRA; Don Frye; Hiroyoshi Tenzan; Satoshi Kojima; Scott Norton; Hiro Saito; Tatsutoshi Goto; Michiyoshi Ohara; Scott Hall; Jado; Gedo; Giant Silva; Giant Singh; Mike Barton; Jim Steele; Steve Williams; Koji Kanemoto; Black Tiger III; Eddie Guerrero; GOKU-DO; Masashi Nakayama (honorary member)
- Name(s): Team 2000; T2000; ArisTrisT
- Debut: February 1999
- Disbanded: September 2002

Team 2000 was a professional wrestling stable that competed in New Japan Pro-Wrestling. Throughout its tenure, T2000 was New Japan's top heel stable.

== History ==
=== Background ===
In August 1998, Masahiro Chono was leader of nWo Japan and won the IWGP Heavyweight Championship. By September, Chono suffered a neck injury which forced him to vacate the IWGP Title and take time off. During Chono's absence, Keiji Mutoh assumed control of nWo Japan and changed its philosophy making them a Face stable.

=== 1999 ===
Upon his return in February 1999, Chono became angry with nWo Japan's direction and decided to break away from the faction and formed a new stable, Team 2000, to battle nWo Japan. For Team 2000, Chono was able to recruit nWo Sting and Michael Wallstreet as both of them followed Chono out of nWo Japan. Chono also brought back AKIRA to New Japan and added MMA legend Don Frye. Throughout the majority of 1999, Team 2000 was feuding with nWo Japan exchanging victories, and in the big shows, most of T2000 (Sting, Wallstreet, and AKIRA) were left off. T2000's first big moments occurred at Strong Style Symphony on April 10, 1999 where Chono fought to a double KO with fellow legend Atsushi Onita in an exploding barbwire match in the opener while Frye main evented with Mutoh for the IWGP Title but was defeated. In August 1999, Chono entered the 1999 G1 Climax but finished in 4th place with 6 points. Despite the loss, Chono was still able to get several big wins, including one over Shinya Hashimoto and eventual winner Manabu Nakanishi. At the next big event: The Battle of Last Summer on August 28, T2000 would go 2–0 with Frye defeating fellow gaijin and nWo Japan member Scott Norton, while Chono defeated Hashimoto. In September 1999, Chono and Frye entered the 1999 G1 Tag League but ultimately finished in 6th place with 6 points. By the end of 1999, T2000 went through several changes as nWo Sting became Super J and Wallstreet left New Japan to return to WCW.

=== 2000 ===
At Wrestling World 2000 on January 4, 2000, the Team 2000/nWo Japan feud continued as both groups would go 1–1 with Frye losing to Norton while Chono defeated Mutoh. On February 4, T2000/nWo Japan feud finally ended when the two stables went at it in a best of 4 series. During the first two matches, the groups would tie 1–1 with AKIRA defeating Hiro Saito while Scott Norton defeated Super J. However, T2000 would dominate for the remainder of the series with Frye defeating Satoshi Kojima and Chono defeating Hiroyoshi Tenzan to give T2000 3–1. The following day on February 5, Frye challenged Kensuke Sasaki for the IWGP Heavyweight Championship but lost. On February 8, Chono announced he retook nWo Japan and absorbed it into Team 2000 giving him all nWo Japan members (except Mutoh) and he also announced the addition of The Mad Dogs (Tatsutoshi Goto and Michiyoshi Ohara). On February 20, Team 2000 did a 10 match series with New Japan which saw Team 2000 emerge victorious with Chono defeating Sasaki in a tie-breaker match. In March, Team 2000 took on New Japan in several title matches hoping to win some gold but would lose both of their title matches with Kojima falling to Sasaki in an IWGP Title match on March 19, while Chono and Tenzan lost to Yuji Nagata and Manabu Nakanishi for the IWGP Tag Team Championship on March 20. On July 20, Tencozy would defeat Nagata and Nakanishi to win the IWGP Tag Titles. In August, Chono, Tenzan, Kojima, Goto, and Saito entered the 2000 G1 Climax but none of them would win as Chono made it the semi-finals losing to Nakanishi. On October 8 at Do Judge, Team 2000 would once again dominate as Frye defeated Takashi Iizuka, Tencozy defeated Nagata and Nakanishi to successfully defend the Tag Team Titles, and Chono teaming with a masked man named "Mr. T" (Goto) defeated Shiro Koshinaka and Masanobu Fuchi but the group did experience one loss as Norton fell to "Dr. Death" Steve Williams. In October, T2000 began a feud with Yuji Nagata's Fighting Club G-EGGS as the two stables began a series with the winning team getting match making rights for Battle Final 2000, in the end thanks to the numbers advantage T2000 won the series 11–8. In November, Team 2000 entered the 200 G1 Tag League with three teams (Tencozy, Chono/Norton, & T2000 Machines), in the end Team 2000 came up short with Chono and Norton (semi-finals) and Tencozy (finals) both fell to eventual winners: Yuji Nagata and Takashi Iizuka. At Battle Final 2000 on December 10 saw Team 2000 get match making rights. Chono would book himself and Goto to challenge Tencozy for the Tag Team Championship, ensuring that win, lose, or draw Team 2000 kept the titles. Chono also booked AKIRA to challenge Minoru Tanaka for the IWGP Junior Heavyweight Championship and had Ohara take on Kensuke Sasaki for Sasaki's spot in the IWGP Heavyweight Championship tournament. While Tencozy retained the title, everything else went wrong as AKIRA fell to Tanaka and Ohara was squashed in six seconds by Sasaki.

=== 2001 ===
At Wrestling World 2001 on January 4, 2001, Chono, Tenzan, and Kojima entered the IWGP Heavyweight Championship tournament hoping to win the IWGP Heavyweight Title but they all lost as Tenzan fell to Toshiaki Kawada in the semi-finals while Kojima (first round) and Chono (semi-final) were defeated by eventual winner: Kensuke Sasaki. In February 2001, Tencozy retained the IWGP Tag Team Title against Manabu Nakanishi and Osamu Nishimura but Team 2000 lost Don Frye. Things picked up for T2000 in March as Chono recruited nWo co-founder: Scott Hall, Tencozy retained the IWGP Tag Titles against Riki Choshu and Shinya Makabe, and in an upset: Scott Norton defeated Sasaki to win the IWGP Heavyweight Championship. Beginning in the spring, Team 2000 began a feud with Keiji Mutoh and his new stable, Bad Ass Translate Trading. On April 9 at Strong Style, T2000 had mixed results as Chono and Tencozy defeated BATT but Norton lost the IWGP Title to Kazuyuki Fujita. At Dome Quake on July 20 saw T2000 rebound as new members: Jado and Gedo defeated Jyushin Thunder Liger and El Samurai to win the IWGP Junior Tag Team Championship, Tencozy retained the IWGP Tag Team Title against BATT's Jinsei Shinzaki and Taiyo Kea, and Chono defeated Mutoh. In August, Chono, Tenzan, and Kojima entered the 2001 G1 Climax but they came up short with Chono losing in the semi-finals. In September 2001, T2000 would experience a downturn as Norton, Hall, J, and newcomer: Giant Silva entered the G1 World League but despite Team 2000 having 4/5 of the participants, they all lost to Don Frye. On September 23, Tencozy would finally lose the Tag Team Title to Tatsumi Fujinami and Osamu Nishimura. In September, T2000 added more members including Giant Singh (who began forming a team with Giant Silva as Club 7) & Koji Kanemoto (both entered Team 2000 at Indicate of Next). Chono also expanded Team 2000 to All Japan Pro Wrestling and recruited Steve Williams, Mike Barton, Jim Steele, & reunited with Mike Rotunda (Michael Wallstreet). On October 27, Chono entered All Japan to challenge Mutoh for the Triple Crown Heavyweight Championship but was defeated, around the same time, Chono also began having problems with Tencozy and a power struggle in Team 2000 began. In December, Williams and Rotundo entered the 2001 World's Strongest Tag Determination League but finished in 5th place with 6 points. At the same time, Team 2000 had 4 teams enter the 2001 G1 Tag League (Tencozy, Chono/Silva, Barton/Steele, & Norton/J), in the end, Tencozy would win the tournament defeating Barton and Steele in the finals.

=== 2002 ===
At the January 4 Dome show, Jado and Gedo (teaming with Dick Togo) lost to Liger, Great Sasuke, & Tiger Mask, Silva lost to Nakaniashi by countout, & Tencozy defeated Chono and Singh. On January 11, 2002, Keiji Mutoh shocked the Japanese Wrestling World by defecting to All Japan. Kojima would be one of the few wrestlers to follow Mutoh to All Japan, ending his involvement with Team 2000. New Japan also ended their relationship with All Japan and the All Japan branch also left as a result, Scott Hall also left New Japan to return to the WWF. Beginning in February/March, Team 2000 added both Black Tiger III and Eddie Guerrero to the group while Super J left to join the New Japan army, and Chono and Tenzan buried the hatchet and reunited. In February, Team 2000 added another accomplishment as Chono, Singh, and Silva won the Teisen Hall Six Man Tag Team Tournament. In the same month, Chono and Silva entered a tournament for the vacated IWGP Heavyweight Championship but neither won. On March 21, Tenzan challenged Tadao Yasuda for the IWGP Title but was defeated. On March 24, Chono and Tenzan reunited their old team and defeated Yuji Nagata and Manabu Nakanishi for the vacated IWGP Tag Team Titles. On May 2, at Toukon Memorial Day, Team 2000 lost their grip on the Jr. Tag Team Titles when Jado and Gedo lost the titles to Jyushin Thunder Liger and Minoru Tanaka, Tenzan and Norton lost to OH Gun (Shinya Hashimoto and Naoya Ogawa), & Chono fought Mitsuharu Misawa to a draw. In June, Team 2000 sent 5 participants (Kanemoto, Jado, Gedo, Black Tiger, & AKIRA) in the 2002 Best of the Super Juniors tournament with Kanemoto winning the tournament. In August, Chono and Tenzan entered the 2002 G1 Climax with Chono eventually winning his fourth G1 Climax defeating Yoshihiro Takayama. Following the G1 Climax tour, Team 2000 began to form an alliance with New Japan against the new Makai Club as well as a foreign army of wrestlers/MMA fighters led by Kazuyuki Fujita and by September 2002, Team 2000 was absorbed into the New Japan army.

=== 2017 ===
Team 2000 made a one-night reunion January 5, 2017, when Kojima, Tenzan, Saito and Norton teamed up with Cheeseburger to defeat Bullet Club (Bad Luck Fale, Bone Soldier, Kenny Omega, Tama Tonga and Tanga Loa) in a ten-man tag team match.

== Championships and accomplishments ==
- New Japan Pro-Wrestling
  - IWGP Heavyweight Championship (1 Time) - Norton
  - IWGP Tag Team Championship (2 Times) - Chono and Tenzan (1 Time) & Tenzan and Kojima (1 Time)
  - IWGP Junior Heavyweight Tag Team Championship (1 Time)- Jado and Gedo
  - G1 Climax (2002) - Chono
  - G1 Tag League (2001) - Tenzan and Kojima
  - Best of the Super Juniors (2002) - Kanemoto
  - Teisen Hall Six Man Tag Team Tournament (2002) - Chono, Singh, and Silva
- Tokyo Sports
  - Best Tag Team Prize (2000, 2001)- Tenzan & Kojima (2000) & Jado and Gedo (2001)
- Wrestling Observer Newsletter awards
  - Tag Team of the Year (2001)- Tenzan and Kojima
