= List of IWGP Tag Team Champions =

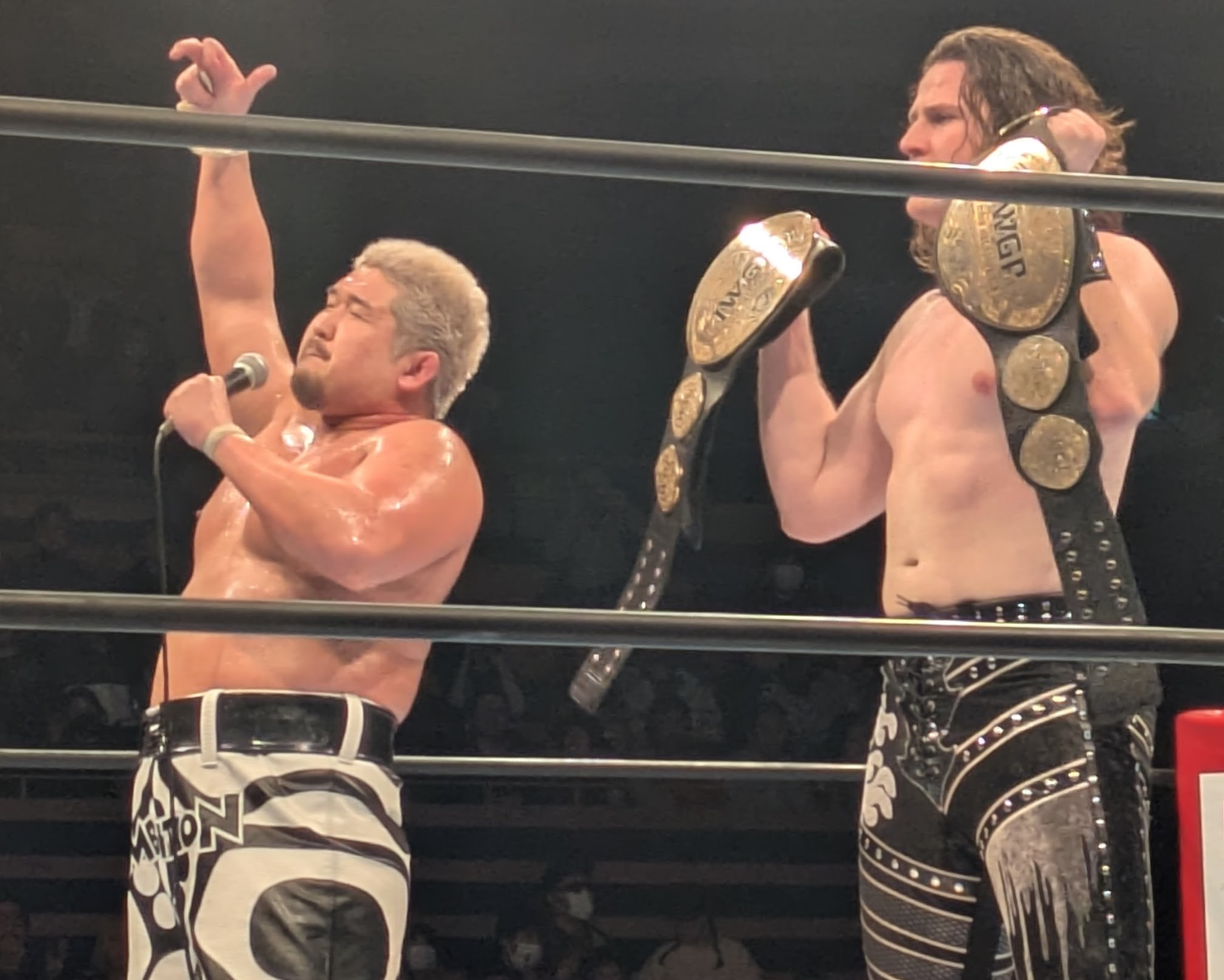
Current champions Yuto-Ice and Oskar

The IWGP Tag Team Championship is a professional wrestling tag team championship owned by the New Japan Pro-Wrestling (NJPW) promotion. "IWGP" are the initials of NJPW's governing body, the International Wrestling Grand Prix. The title was introduced on December 12, 1985, at an NJPW live event. The IWGP Heavyweight Tag Team Championship is not the only tag team title contested for in NJPW; the IWGP Junior Heavyweight Tag Team Championship is also sanctioned by NJPW. According to NJPW's official website, the IWGP Tag Team Championship is considered the "IWGP Heavy Weight Class", while the Junior Heavyweight Tag Team Championship is listed as the "IWGP Jr. Tag Class". Like most professional wrestling championships, the title is won via the result of a scripted match. Title changes usually happen at NJPW-promoted events;. However, the title has only changed hands twice at a non-NJPW event, it has been defended in several other promotions.

Hiroyoshi Tenzan currently holds the record for most reigns by an individual wrestler, with twelve. Tenzan's combined twelve reign lengths add up to 1,988 days, which is the most of any champion. At seven reigns, Guerrillas of Destiny (Tama Tonga and Tanga Loa) hold the record for most by a team. Tenzan and Masahiro Chono's combined five reign lengths add up to 1,010 days (the most of any team). At 564 days, Bad Intentions' (Giant Bernard and Karl Anderson) only reign is the longest in the title's history. Keiji Muto and Shiro Koshinaka's only reign is the shortest, at six days. Currently, Bad Intentions' only reign has the most defenses, with ten. Overall, there have been 113 reigns shared among 97 wrestlers, who made up 73 different teams.

Knock Out Brothers (Yuto-Ice and Oskar) are the current champions in their second reign. They won the title by defeating United Empire (Henare and Great-O-Khan) on Night 1 of Road to King of Pro-Wrestling in Tokyo, Japan, on October 6, 2026.

== Title history ==
As of November 22, 2026.

Key
No.	Overall reign number
Reign	Reign number for the specific team—reign numbers for the individuals are in parentheses, if different
Days	Number of days held
Defenses	Number of successful defenses
†	Championship change is unrecognized by the promotion
+	Current reign is changing daily

No.	Champion	Championship change			Reign statistics			Notes	Ref.
No.	Champion	Date	Event	Location	Reign	Days	Defenses	Notes	Ref.
New Japan Pro Wrestling (NJPW)
1	Kengo Kimura and Tatsumi Fujinami	December 12, 1985	IWGP Tag Team League	Sendai, Japan	1	236	5	Defeated Antonio Inoki and Seiji Sakaguchi in a tournament final to become the first champions.	
2	Akira Maeda and Osamu Kido	August 5, 1986	Burning Spirit in Summer	Tokyo, Japan	1	49	1		
3	Kengo Kimura and Tatsumi Fujinami	September 23, 1986	Challenge Spirit 1986	Tokyo, Japan	2	135	0		
—	Vacated	February 5, 1987	—	—	—	—	—	The championship was vacated when Kimura and Fujinami split up.	
4	Keiji Muto and Shiro Koshinaka	March 20, 1987	Spring Flare Up 1987	Tokyo, Japan	1	6	0	Defeated Akira Maeda and Nobuhiko Takada in a tournament final to win the vacant championship.	
5	Akira Maeda and Nobuhiko Takada	March 26, 1987	Inoki Toukon Live II	Osaka, Japan	1 (2, 1)	159	2		
6	Kazuo Yamazaki and Yoshiaki Fujiwara	September 1, 1987	Sengoku Battle Series 1987	Fukuoka, Japan	1	139	2		
7	Kengo Kimura and Tatsumi Fujinami	January 18, 1988	New Year Golden Series 1988	Takuyama, Japan	3	144	3		
8	Masa Saito and Riki Choshu	June 10, 1988	IWGP Champion Series 1988	Hiroshima, Japan	1	279	4		
9	George Takano and Super Strong Machine	March 16, 1989	Big Fight Series	Yokohama, Japan	1	119	1	This title change was via countout	
10	Riki Choshu and Takayuki Iizuka (Note: Takayuki Iizuka also used the ring name Takashi Iizuka and won the IWGP Tag Team Championship once with Toru Yano.)	July 13, 1989	Super Fight Series	Tokyo, Japan	1 (2, 1)	69	1		
11	Masa Saito and Shinya Hashimoto	September 20, 1989	Bloody Fight Series 1989: Super Power Battle in Osaka	Osaka, Japan	1 (2, 1)	219	3		
12	Keiji Muto and Masahiro Chono	April 27, 1990	Shintou Station Bay NK	Tokyo, Japan	1 (2, 1)	188	3		
13	Hiroshi Hase and Kensuke Sasaki	November 1, 1990	Dream Tour 1990	Tokyo, Japan	1	55	2		
14	Hiro Saito and Super Strong Machine	December 26, 1990	King of Kings	Hamamatsu, Japan	1 (1, 2)	70	2		
15	Hiroshi Hase and Kensuke Sasaki	March 6, 1991	Big Fight Series 1991	Nagasaki, Japan	2	15	0		
16	The Steiner Brothers (Rick Steiner and Scott Steiner)	March 21, 1991	Starrcade 1991 in Tokyo Dome	Tokyo, Japan	1	229	2	The Steiners' WCW World Tag Team Championship was also on the line.	
17	Hiroshi Hase and Keiji Muto	November 5, 1991	Tokyo 3Days Battle	Tokyo, Japan	1 (3, 3)	117	2	Scott Norton substituted for an injured Scott Steiner in this match.	
18	Big, Bad, and Dangerous (Big Van Vader and Crusher Bam Bam Bigelow)	March 1, 1992	Big Fight Series 1992: New Japan Pro-Wrestling 20th Anniversary Show	Yokohama, Japan	1	117	2		
19	The Steiner Brothers (Rick Steiner and Scott Steiner)	June 26, 1992	Masters of Wrestling	Tokyo, Japan	2	149	3	The Steiners' WCW World Tag Team Championship was also on the line.	
20	Scott Norton and Tony Halme	November 22, 1992	Wrestling Scramble 1992: Battle Zone Space I	Tokyo, Japan	1	22	0		
21	The Hell Raisers (Hawk Warrior and Power Warrior (Note: Kensuke Sasaki used the ring name Power Warrior, while he was a part of The Hell Raisers.))	December 14, 1992	Battle Final 1992	Tokyo, Japan	1 (1, 3)	234	4		
22	The Jurassic Powers (Hercules Hernandez and Scott Norton)	August 5, 1993	G1 Climax 1993	Tokyo, Japan	1 (1, 2)	152	3		
23	The Hell Raisers (Hawk Warrior and Power Warrior)	January 4, 1994	Battlefield	Tokyo, Japan	2 (2, 4)	325	2		
24	Hiroshi Hase and Keiji Muto	November 25, 1994	Battle Final 1994	Iwate, Japan	2 (4, 4)	162	1		
—	Vacated	May 6, 1995	—	—	—	—	—	The title was vacated by Muto after he won the IWGP Heavyweight Championship.	
25	Cho-Ten (Hiroyoshi Tenzan and Masahiro Chono)	June 12, 1995	Fighting Spirit Legend	Osaka, Japan	1 (1, 2)	25	0	Defeated Junji Hirata and Shinya Hashimoto to win the vacant championship.	
—	Vacated	July 7, 1995	—	—	—	—	—	The title was vacated when Chono missed a title defense due to his father's death.	
26	Junji Hirata and Shinya Hashimoto	July 13, 1995	Best of the Super Jr. II	Sapporo, Japan	1 (3, 2)	335	6	Defeated Mike Enos and Scott Norton to win the vacant championship. Hirata was previously known as Super Strong Machine.	
27	Kazuo Yamazaki and Takashi Iizuka (Note: Takayuki Iizuka also used the ring name Takashi Iizuka and won the IWGP Tag Team Championship once with Kazuo Yamazaki.)	June 12, 1996	Best of the Super Jr. III	Osaka, Japan	1 (2, 2)	34	0		
28	Cho-Ten (Hiroyoshi Tenzan and Masahiro Chono)	July 16, 1996	Summer Struggle 1996	Sapporo, Japan	2 (2, 3)	172	2		
29	Kengo Kimura and Tatsumi Fujinami	January 4, 1997	Wrestling World 1997	Tokyo, Japan	4	98	3		
30	Kensuke Sasaki and Riki Choshu	April 12, 1997	Battle Formation	Tokyo, Japan	1 (5, 3)	21	0		
31	The Bull Powers (Manabu Nakanishi and Satoshi Kojima)	May 3, 1997	Strong Style Evolution	Osaka, Japan	1	99	1		
32	Kazuo Yamazaki and Kensuke Sasaki	August 10, 1997	The Four Heaven in Nagoya Dome	Nagoya, Japan	1 (3, 6)	70	0		
33	Keiji Muto and Masahiro Chono	October 19, 1997	nWo Typhoon 1997	Kobe, Japan	2 (5, 4)	200	2		
—	Vacated	May 7, 1998	—	—	—	—	—	The title was vacated due to Muto having surgery on his knee.	
34	Cho-Ten (Hiroyoshi Tenzan and Masahiro Chono)	June 5, 1998	Best of the Super Juniors V	Tokyo, Japan	3 (3, 5)	40	0	Defeated Genichiro Tenryu and Shiro Koshinaka in a tournament final to win the vacant championship.	
35	Genichiro Tenryu and Shiro Koshinaka	July 15, 1998	Summer Struggle 1998	Sapporo, Japan	1 (1, 2)	173	2		
36	Tencozy (Hiroyoshi Tenzan and Satoshi Kojima)	January 4, 1999	Wrestling World 1999	Tokyo, Japan	1 (4, 2)	77	1		
37	Kensuke Sasaki and Shiro Koshinaka	March 22, 1999	Hyper Battle 1999	Amagasaki, Japan	1 (7, 3)	97	2		
38	The Mad Dogs (Michiyoshi Ohara and Tatsutoshi Goto)	June 27, 1999	Summer Struggle 1999	Shizuoka, Japan	1	62	1		
39	Manabu Nakanishi and Yuji Nagata	August 28, 1999	Jingu Climax	Shizuoka, Japan	1 (2, 1)	327	4		
40	Tencozy (Hiroyoshi Tenzan and Satoshi Kojima)	July 20, 2000	Summer Struggle 2000	Tokyo, Japan	2 (5, 3)	430	6		
41	Osamu Nishimura and Tatsumi Fujinami	September 23, 2001	G1 World 2001	Osaka, Japan	1 (1, 5)	35	1		
42	BATT (Keiji Muto and Taiyō Kea)	October 28, 2001	Survival 2001: Fighting Destination in Fukuoka	Fukuoka, Japan	1 (6, 1)	97	0		
—	Vacated	February 2, 2002	—	—	—	—	—	The title was vacated due to Muto leaving NJPW.	
43	Cho-Ten (Hiroyoshi Tenzan and Masahiro Chono)	March 24, 2002	Hyper Battle 2002	Hyōgo, Japan	4 (6, 6)	446	7	Defeated Manabu Nakanishi and Yuji Nagata in a tournament final to win the vacant championship.	
44	Hiroshi Tanahashi and Yutaka Yoshie	June 13, 2003	Crush	Tokyo, Japan	1	184	3		
45	Hiroyoshi Tenzan and Osamu Nishimura	December 14, 2003	Battle Final 2003	Nagoya, Japan	1 (7, 2)	49	0		
46	Minoru Suzuki and Yoshihiro Takayama	February 1, 2004	Fighting Spirit 2004	Sapporo, Japan	1	294	4		
—	Vacated	November 21, 2004	—	—	—	—	—	The title was vacated due to Takayama being sidelined with an injury.	
47	Hiroshi Tanahashi and Shinsuke Nakamura	December 11, 2004	Battle Final 2004	Osaka, Japan	1 (2, 1)	323	4	Defeated Kensuke Sasaki and Minoru Suzuki to win the vacant title.	
48	Cho-Ten (Hiroyoshi Tenzan and Masahiro Chono)	October 30, 2005	Toukon Series 2005	Kobe, Japan	5 (8, 7)	325	3		
—	Shiro Koshinaka and Togi Makabe	July 2, 2006	Circuit 2006 Turbulence	Tokyo, Japan	—	15	0	An interim tag team title was created when Tenzan and Chono showed signs of inactivity. Makabe and Koshinaka defeated Giant Bernard and Travis Tomko in a tournament final to win the title.	
—	Wild Child (Manabu Nakanishi and Takao Omori)	July 17, 2006	Circuit 2006 Turbulence	Sapporo, Japan	—	73	0		
—	Vacated	September 20, 2006	—	—	—	—	—	NJPW president Simon Kelly Inoki stripped Chono and Tenzan of the title after Chono and Tenzan ceased teaming.	
49	Wild Child (Manabu Nakanishi and Takao Omori)	September 28, 2006	Circuit 2006 Final: Next Progress	Sapporo, Japan	1 (3, 1)	164	1	Nakanishi and Ōmori were promoted to undisputed champions on September 28, 2006.	
50	RISE (Giant Bernard and Travis Tomko)	March 11, 2007	New Japan Pro-Wrestling 35th Anniversary Tour Circuit 2007 New Japan Evolution: New Japan Cup 2007	Nagoya, Japan	1	343	5		
51	The Most Violent Players (Togi Makabe and Toru Yano)	February 17, 2008	Circuit 2008 New Japan Ism	Tokyo, Japan	1	322	4		
52	Team 3D (Brother Devon and Brother Ray)	January 4, 2009	Wrestle Kingdom III in Tokyo Dome	Tokyo, Japan	1	198	4		
53	The British Invasion (Brutus Magnus and Doug Williams)	July 21, 2009	TNA Impact!	Orlando, Florida	1	89	1	This was a tables match that aired on the July 30, 2009, episode of Total Nonstop Action Wrestling's Impact!. NJPW did not sanction the match, nor initially recognize nor sanction the title change until August 10.	
54	Team 3D (Brother Devon and Brother Ray)	October 18, 2009	Bound for Glory	Irvine, California, U.S.	2	78	1	This was a four-way Full Metal Mayhem Tag Team match, which also included Beer Money, Inc. and Booker T and Scott Steiner and was contested also for the TNA World Tag Team Championship, which was won by The British Invasion.	
55	No Limit (Tetsuya Naito and Yujiro Takahashi)	January 4, 2010	Wrestle Kingdom IV in Tokyo Dome	Tokyo, Japan	1	119	1	This was a three-way hardcore match, which also included Bad Intentions (Giant Bernard and Karl Anderson).	
56	Seigigun (Wataru Inoue and Yuji Nagata)	May 3, 2010	Wrestling Dontaku 2010	Fukuoka, Japan	1 (1, 2)	47	0	This was a three-way match, which also included Bad Intentions (Giant Bernard and Karl Anderson).	
57	Bad Intentions (Giant Bernard and Karl Anderson)	June 19, 2010	Dominion 6.19	Osaka, Japan	1 (2, 1)	564	10	This was a three-way elimination match, which also included No Limit (Tetsuya Naito and Yujiro Takahashi).	
58	Tencozy (Hiroyoshi Tenzan and Satoshi Kojima)	January 4, 2012	Wrestle Kingdom VI in Tokyo Dome	Tokyo, Japan	3 (9, 4)	120	2		
59	Chaos (Takashi Iizuka and Toru Yano)	May 3, 2012	Wrestling Dontaku 2012	Fukuoka, Japan	1 (3, 2)	48	0		
—	Vacated	June 20, 2012	—	—	—	—	—	Iizuka and Yano were stripped of the title, after a title match between them and Tencozy (Hiroyoshi Tenzan and Satoshi Kojima) on June 16 ended in a no contest.	
60	Tencozy (Hiroyoshi Tenzan and Satoshi Kojima)	July 22, 2012	Kizuna Road	Yamagata, Japan	4 (10, 5)	78	0	Defeated Chaos (Takashi Iizuka and Toru Yano) to win the vacant title.	
61	Killer Elite Squad (Davey Boy Smith Jr. and Lance Archer)	October 8, 2012	King of Pro-Wrestling	Tokyo, Japan	1	207	5		
62	Tencozy (Hiroyoshi Tenzan and Satoshi Kojima)	May 3, 2013	Wrestling Dontaku 2013	Fukuoka, Japan	5 (11, 6)	190	2	This was a four-way match, which also included Chaos (Takashi Iizuka and Toru Yano) and Muscle Orchestra (Manabu Nakanishi and Strong Man).	
63	Killer Elite Squad (Davey Boy Smith Jr. and Lance Archer)	November 9, 2013	Power Struggle	Osaka, Japan	2	56	0	This was the second fall of a two-fall three-way tornado tag team match which also included The IronGodz (Jax Dane and Rob Conway).	
64	Bullet Club (Karl Anderson and Doc Gallows)	January 4, 2014	Wrestle Kingdom 8 in Tokyo Dome	Tokyo, Japan	1 (2, 1)	365	6		
65	Meiyu Tag (Hirooki Goto and Katsuyori Shibata)	January 4, 2015	Wrestle Kingdom 9 in Tokyo Dome	Tokyo, Japan	1	38	0		
66	Bullet Club (Karl Anderson and Doc Gallows)	February 11, 2015	The New Beginning in Osaka	Osaka, Japan	2 (3, 2)	53	0		
67	The Kingdom (Matt Taven and Michael Bennett)	April 5, 2015	Invasion Attack 2015	Tokyo, Japan	1	91	0		
68	Bullet Club (Karl Anderson and Doc Gallows)	July 5, 2015	Dominion 7.5 in Osaka-jo Hall	Osaka, Japan	3 (4, 3)	183	1		
69	Great Bash Heel (Togi Makabe and Tomoaki Honma)	January 4, 2016	Wrestle Kingdom 10 in Tokyo Dome	Tokyo, Japan	1 (2, 1)	97	1		
70	Guerrillas of Destiny (Tama Tonga and Tanga Loa)	April 10, 2016	Invasion Attack 2016	Tokyo, Japan	1	70	1		
71	The Briscoe Brothers (Jay Briscoe and Mark Briscoe)	June 19, 2016	Dominion 6.19 in Osaka-jo Hall	Osaka, Japan	1	113	2		
72	Guerrillas of Destiny (Tama Tonga and Tanga Loa)	October 10, 2016	King of Pro-Wrestling	Tokyo, Japan	2	86	1		
73	Chaos (Tomohiro Ishii and Toru Yano)	January 4, 2017	Wrestle Kingdom 11 in Tokyo Dome	Tokyo, Japan	1 (1, 3)	61	2	This was a three-way match, which also included G.B.H. (Togi Makabe and Tomoaki Honma).	
74	Tencozy (Hiroyoshi Tenzan and Satoshi Kojima)	March 6, 2017	Hataage Kinenbi	Tokyo, Japan	6 (12, 7)	34	0		
75	War Machine (Hanson and Raymond Rowe)	April 9, 2017	Sakura Genesis 2017	Tokyo, Japan	1	63	1		
76	Guerrillas of Destiny (Tama Tonga and Tanga Loa)	June 11, 2017	Dominion 6.11 in Osaka-jo Hall	Osaka, Japan	3	20	0		
77	War Machine (Hanson and Raymond Rowe)	July 1, 2017	G1 Special in USA	Long Beach, California, U.S.	2	85	3	This was a no disqualification match.	
78	Killer Elite Squad (Davey Boy Smith Jr. and Lance Archer)	September 24, 2017	Destruction in Kobe	Kobe, Japan	3	102	1	This was a three-way tornado tag team match, which also included Guerrillas of Destiny (Tama Tonga and Tanga Loa).	
79	Los Ingobernables de Japón (Evil and Sanada)	January 4, 2018	Wrestle Kingdom 12 in Tokyo Dome	Tokyo, Japan	1	156	2		
80	The Young Bucks (Matt Jackson and Nick Jackson)	June 9, 2018	Dominion 6.9 in Osaka-jo Hall	Osaka, Japan	1	113	1		
81	Guerrillas of Destiny (Tama Tonga and Tanga Loa)	September 30, 2018	Fighting Spirit Unleashed	Long Beach, California, U.S.	4	96	0		
82	Los Ingobernables de Japón (Evil and Sanada)	January 4, 2019	Wrestle Kingdom 13 in Tokyo Dome	Tokyo, Japan	2	50	1	This was a three-way match, which also included The Young Bucks (Matt and Nick Jackson).	
83	Guerrillas of Destiny (Tama Tonga and Tanga Loa)	February 23, 2019	Honor Rising: Japan 2019 (Night 2)	Tokyo, Japan	5	315	7		
84	FinJuice (David Finlay and Juice Robinson)	January 4, 2020	Wrestle Kingdom 14 in Tokyo Dome; Night 1	Tokyo, Japan	1	28	0		
85	Guerrillas of Destiny (Tama Tonga and Tanga Loa)	February 1, 2020	The New Beginning USA	Atlanta, Georgia, U.S.	6	20	0		
86	Golden☆Ace (Hiroshi Tanahashi and Kota Ibushi)	February 21, 2020	New Japan Road	Tokyo, Japan	1 (3, 1)	142	0		
87	Dangerous Tekkers (Taichi and Zack Sabre Jr.)	July 12, 2020	Dominion in Osaka-jo Hall	Osaka, Japan	1	176	2		
88	Guerrillas of Destiny (Tama Tonga and Tanga Loa)	January 4, 2021	Wrestle Kingdom 15 in Tokyo Dome; Night 1	Tokyo, Japan	7	148	2		
89	Dangerous Tekkers (Taichi and Zack Sabre Jr.)	June 1, 2021	Road to Dominion	Tokyo, Japan	2	40	0		
90	Los Ingobernables de Japón (Tetsuya Naito and Sanada)	July 11, 2021	Summer Struggle in Sapporo; Night 2	Sapporo, Japan	1 (2, 3)	14	0		
91	Dangerous Tekkers (Taichi and Zack Sabre Jr.)	July 25, 2021	Wrestle Grand Slam in Tokyo Dome	Tokyo, Japan	3	163	1		
92	Bishamon (Hirooki Goto and Yoshi-Hashi)	January 4, 2022	Wrestle Kingdom 16; Night 1	Tokyo, Japan	1 (2, 1)	95	1		
93	United Empire (Great-O-Khan and Jeff Cobb)	April 9, 2022	Hyper Battle '22	Tokyo, Japan	1	22	0		
94	General's Jewel (Bad Luck Fale and Chase Owens)	May 1, 2022	Wrestling Dontaku	Fukuoka, Japan	1	42	0	This was a three-way match, which also included Bishamon (Hirooki Goto and Yoshi-Hashi).	
95	United Empire (Great-O-Khan and Jeff Cobb)	June 12, 2022	Dominion 6.12 in Osaka-jo Hall	Osaka, Japan	2	14	0		
96	FTR (Dax Harwood and Cash Wheeler)	June 26, 2022	Forbidden Door	Chicago, Illinois, U.S.	1	192	2	This was a Winner Take All three-way match, which also included Roppongi Vice (Rocky Romero and Trent Beretta). FTR's ROH World Tag Team Championship was also on the line.	
97	Bishamon (Hirooki Goto and Yoshi-Hashi)	January 4, 2023	Wrestle Kingdom 17	Tokyo, Japan	2 (3, 2)	94	2		
98	Aussie Open (Mark Davis and Kyle Fletcher)	April 8, 2023	Sakura Genesis	Tokyo, Japan	1	43	2		
—	Vacated	May 21, 2023	Resurgence	Long Beach, CA	—	—	—	Kyle Fletcher vacated the Strong and the IWGP Tag Team Championship after Mark Davis suffered an injury.	
99	Bishamon (Hirooki Goto and Yoshi-Hashi)	June 4, 2023	Dominion 6.4 in Osaka-jo Hall	Tokyo, Japan	3 (4, 3)	214	2	Defeated House of Torture (Evil and Yujiro Takahashi) and United Empire (Great-O-Khan and Aaron Henare) in a three-way tag team match to win the vacant titles. The match was also disputed for the vacant Strong Openweight Tag Team Championship.	
100	Guerrillas of Destiny (El Phantasmo and Hikuleo)	January 4, 2024	Wrestle Kingdom 18	Tokyo, Japan	1	38	0	This was a Winners Takes All tag team match in which Phantasmo and Hikuleo's Strong Openweight Tag Team Championship were also on the line.	
101	Bullet Club (Chase Owens and Kenta)	February 11, 2024	The New Beginning in Osaka	Osaka, Japan	1 (2, 1)	55	0		
102	Bishamon (Hirooki Goto and Yoshi-Hashi)	April 6, 2024	Sakura Genesis	Tokyo, Japan	4 (5, 4)	28	1		
103	Bullet Club (Chase Owens and Kenta)	May 4, 2024	Wrestling Dontaku; Night 2	Fukuoka, Japan	2 (3, 2)	36	0		
104	TMDK (Mikey Nicholls and Shane Haste)	June 9, 2024	Dominion 6.9 in Osaka-jo Hall	Osaka, Japan	1 (1, 1)	148	1	This was a Four-way tornado tag team elimination Winners Take All match also disputed for the Strong Openweight Tag Team Championship which also involved the teams of Guerrillas of Destiny (Hikuleo and El Phantasmo) and Bishamon (Hirooki Goto and Yoshi-Hashi).	
105	United Empire (Henare and Great-O-Khan)	November 4, 2024	Power Struggle	Osaka, Japan	1 (3, 1)	35	0		
—	Vacated	December 9, 2024	—	—	—	—	—	The titles were vacated after Henare suffered an injury.	
106	The Young Bucks (Matthew Jackson and Nicholas Jackson)	January 5, 2025	Wrestle Dynasty	Tokyo, Japan	2	37	0	Defeated United Empire (Jeff Cobb and Great-O-Khan) and Los Ingobernables de Japón (Tetsuya Naito and Hiromu Takahashi) in a three-way tag team match for the vacant titles.	
107	Los Ingobernables de Japon (Tetsuya Naito and Hiromu Takahashi)	February 11, 2025	The New Beginning in Osaka	Osaka, Japan	1 (3, 1)	53	0		
108	United Empire (Jeff Cobb and Callum Newman)	April 5, 2025	Sakura Genesis	Tokyo, Japan	1 (3,1)	9	0		
—	Vacated	April 14, 2025	—	—	—	—	—	The titles were vacated due to Cobb's departure from NJPW.	
109	United Empire (Callum Newman and Great-O-Khan)	April 26, 2025	Wrestling Redzone in Hiroshima	Hiroshima, Japan	1 (2, 4)	50	0	Defeated Bishamon (Hirooki Goto and Yoshi-Hashi to win the vacant titles.	
110	Taichi and Tomohiro Ishii	June 15, 2025	Dominion 6.15 in Osaka-jo Hall	Osaka, Japan	1 (4, 2)	105	0		
111	Knock Out Brothers (Yuto-Ice and Oskar)	September 28, 2025	Destruction in Kobe	Kobe, Japan	1 (1, 1)	259	6	Ice and Oskar won the titles while part of the Bullet Club. Over the latter stable's dissolution at New Year Dash!! on January 5, 2026, they transferred to Unbound Co.	
112	United Empire (Henare and Great-O-Khan)	June 14, 2026	Dominion 6.14 in Osaka-jo Hall	Osaka, Japan	2 (2, 5)	114	0		
113	Knock Out Brothers (Yuto-Ice and Oskar)	October 6, 2026	Road to King of Pro-Wrestling; Night 1	Tokyo, Japan	2	47+	1		

== Combined reigns ==
As of November 22, 2026.

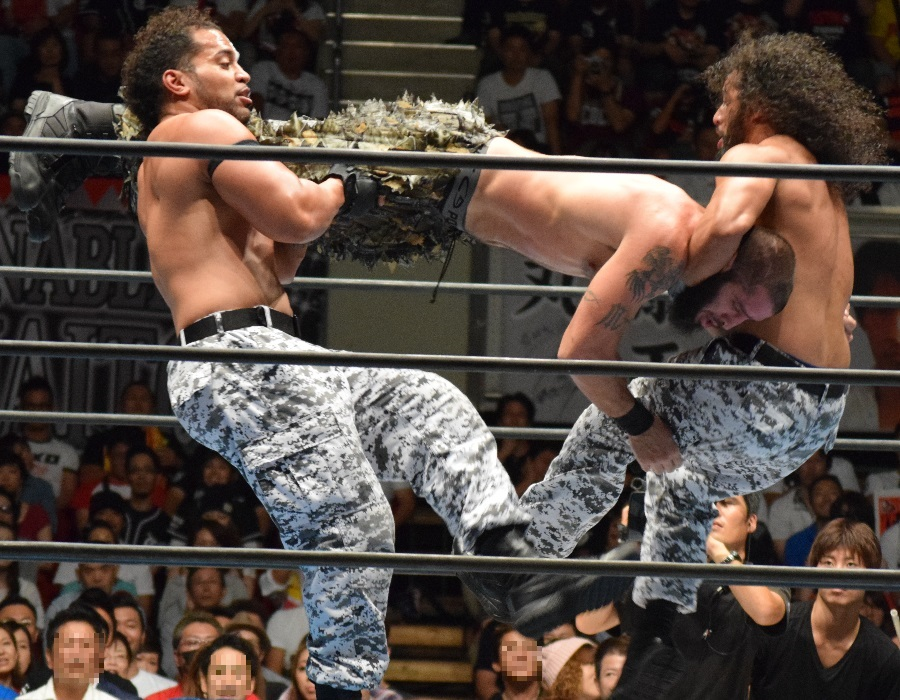
Guerrillas of Destiny (Tanga Loa (left) and Tama Tonga (right)), record seven-time champions

†	Indicates the current champions

=== By team ===
Rank	Team	No. of reigns	Combined defenses	Combined days
1	Cho-Ten (Hiroyoshi Tenzan and Masahiro Chono)	5	12	1,008
2	Tencozy (Hiroyoshi Tenzan and Satoshi Kojima)	6	11	929
3	Guerrillas of Destiny (Tama Tonga and Tanga Loa)	7	11	755
4	Kengo Kimura and Tatsumi Fujinami	4	11	613
5	Bullet Club (Doc Gallows and Karl Anderson)	3	7	601
6	Bad Intentions (Giant Bernard and Karl Anderson)	1	10	564
7	The Hell Raisers (Hawk Warrior and Power Warrior)	2	6	559
8	Bishamon (Hirooki Goto and Yoshi-Hashi)	4	6	431
9	Keiji Muto and Masahiro Chono	2	5	388
10	Dangerous Tekkers (Taichi and Zack Sabre Jr.)	3	3	379
11	The Steiner Brothers (Rick Steiner and Scott Steiner)	2	5	378
12	Killer Elite Squad (Davey Boy Smith Jr. and Lance Archer)	3	6	365
13	RISE (Giant Bernard and Travis Tomko)	1	5	343
14	Junji Hirata and Shinya Hashimoto	1	6	335
15	Manabu Nakanishi and Yuji Nagata	1	4	327
16	Hiroshi Tanahashi and Shinsuke Nakamura	1	4	323
17	The Most Violent Players (Togi Makabe and Toru Yano)	1	4	322
18	Knock Out Brothers † (Yuto-Ice and Oskar)	2	7	306+
19	Minoru Suzuki and Yoshihiro Takayama	1	4	294
20	Hiroshi Hase and Keiji Muto	2	3	279
20	Masa Saito and Riki Choshu	1	4	279
22	Team 3D (Brother Devon and Brother Ray)	2	5	276
23	Masa Saito and Shinya Hashimoto	1	3	219
24	Los Ingobernables de Japón (Evil and Sanada)	2	3	206
25	FTR (Dax Harwood and Cash Wheeler)	1	2	192
26	Hiroshi Tanahashi and Yutaka Yoshie	1	3	184
27	Genichiro Tenryu and Shiro Koshinaka	1	2	173
28	Wild Child (Manabu Nakanishi and Takao Omori)	1	1	164
29	Akira Maeda and Nobuhiko Takada	1	2	159
30	The Jurassic Powers (Hercules Hernandez and Scott Norton)	1	3	152
31	The Young Bucks (Matt/Matthew Jackson and Nick/Nicholas Jackson)	2	1	150
32	United Empire (Henare and Great-O-Khan)	2	0	149
33	War Machine (Hanson and Raymond Rowe)	2	4	148
33	TMDK (Mikey Nicholls and Shane Haste)	1	1	148
35	Golden☆Ace (Hiroshi Tanahashi and Kota Ibushi)	1	0	142
36	Kazuo Yamazaki and Yoshiaki Fujiwara	1	2	139
37	George Takano and Super Strong Machine	1	1	119
37	No Limit (Tetsuya Naito and Yujiro Takahashi)	1	1	119
39	Big, Bad, and Dangerous (Big Van Vader and Crusher Bam Bam Bigelow)	1	2	117
40	The Briscoe Brothers (Jay Briscoe and Mark Briscoe)	1	2	113
41	Taichi and Tomohiro Ishii	1	0	105
42	The Bull Powers (Manabu Nakanishi and Satoshi Kojima)	1	1	99
43	Kensuke Sasaki and Shiro Koshinaka	1	2	97
43	Great Bash Heel (Togi Makabe and Tomoaki Honma)	1	1	97
43	BATT (Keiji Muto and Taiyō Kea)	1	0	97
46	The Kingdom (Matt Taven and Michael Bennett)	1	0	91
46	Bullet Club (Chase Owens and Kenta)	2	0	91
48	The British Invasion (Brutus Magnus and Doug Williams)	1	1	89
49	Hiroshi Hase and Kensuke Sasaki	2	2	70
49	Hiro Saito and Super Strong Machine	1	2	70
49	Kazuo Yamazaki and Kensuke Sasaki	1	0	70
52	Riki Choshu and Takayuki Iizuka	1	1	69
53	The Mad Dogs (Michiyoshi Ohara and Tatsutoshi Goto)	1	1	62
54	Chaos (Tomohiro Ishii and Toru Yano)	1	2	61
55	Los Ingobernables de Japon (Tetsuya Naito and Hiromu Takahashi)	1	0	53
56	United Empire (Callum Newman and Great-O-Khan)	1	0	50
57	Akira Maeda and Osamu Kido	1	1	49
57	Hiroyoshi Tenzan and Osamu Nishimura	1	0	49
59	Chaos (Takashi Iizuka and Toru Yano)	1	0	48
60	Seigigun (Wataru Inoue and Yuji Nagata)	1	0	47
61	Aussie Open (Mark Davis and Kyle Fletcher)	1	2	43
62	Bullet Club/General's Jewel (Bad Luck Fale and Chase Owens)	1	0	42
63	Meiyu Tag (Hirooki Goto and Katsuyori Shibata)	1	0	38
63	Guerrillas of Destiny (El Phantasmo and Hikuleo)	1	0	38
65	United Empire (Great-O-Khan and Jeff Cobb)	2	0	36
66	Osamu Nishimura and Tatsumi Fujinami	1	1	35
67	Kazuo Yamazaki and Takashi Iizuka	1	0	34
68	FinJuice (David Finlay and Juice Robinson)	1	0	28
69	Scott Norton and Tony Halme	1	0	22
70	Kensuke Sasaki and Riki Choshu	1	0	21
71	Los Ingobernables de Japón (Tetsuya Naito and Sanada)	1	0	14
72	United Empire (Jeff Cobb and Callum Newman)	1	0	9
73	Keiji Muto and Shiro Koshinaka	1	0	6

=== By wrestler ===
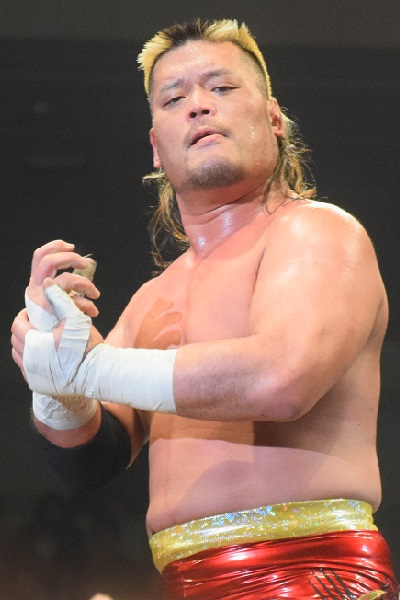
Record twelve-time as well as longest combined reigning Tag Team champion Hiroyoshi Tenzan

Rank	Wrestler	No. of reigns	Combined defenses	Combined days
1	Hiroyoshi Tenzan	12	23	1,986
2	Masahiro Chono	7	17	1,396
3	Karl Anderson	4	17	1,165
4	Satoshi Kojima	7	12	1,028
5	Giant Bernard	2	15	907
6	Kensuke Sasaki/Power Warrior	7	10	817
7	Keiji Muto	6	8	770
8	Tama Tonga	7	11	755
8	Tanga Loa	7	11	755
10	Hiroshi Tanahashi	3	7	649
11	Tatsumi Fujinami	5	12	648
12	Kengo Kimura	4	11	613
13	Doc Gallows	3	7	601
14	Manabu Nakanishi	3	6	590
15	Hawk Warrior	2	6	559
16	Shinya Hashimoto	2	9	554
17	Junji Hirata/Super Strong Machine	3	9	524
18	Masa Saito	2	7	498
19	Taichi	4	3	484
20	Hirooki Goto	5	6	469
21	Toru Yano	3	6	431
21	Yoshi-Hashi	3	6	431
23	Togi Makabe	2	5	419
24	Zack Sabre Jr.	3	3	379
25	Rick Steiner	2	5	378
25	Scott Steiner	2	5	378
27	Yuji Nagata	2	4	374
28	Riki Choshu	3	5	369
29	Davey Boy Smith Jr.	3	6	365
29	Lance Archer	3	6	365
31	Hiroshi Hase	4	5	349
32	Travis Tomko	1	5	343
33	Shinsuke Nakamura	1	4	323
34	Yuto-Ice †	2	7	306+
34	Oskar †	2	7	306+
36	Minoru Suzuki	1	4	294
36	Yoshihiro Takayama	1	4	294
38	Shiro Koshinaka	3	4	276
38	Brother Devon	2	5	276
38	Brother Ray	2	5	276
41	Kazuo Yamazaki	3	2	243
42	Great-O-Khan	5	0	235
43	Sanada	3	3	220
44	Akira Maeda	2	3	208
45	Evil	2	3	206
46	Dax Harwood	1	2	192
46	Cash Wheeler	1	2	192
48	Tetsuya Naito	3	1	186
49	Yutaka Yoshie	1	3	184
50	Scott Norton	2	3	174
51	Genichiro Tenryu	1	2	173
52	Tomohiro Ishii	2	2	166
53	Takao Omori	1	1	164
54	Nobuhiko Takada	1	2	159
55	Hercules Hernandez	1	3	152
56	Takayuki/Takashi Iizuka	3	1	151
57	Matt/Matthew Jackson	2	1	150
57	Nick/Nicholas Jackson	2	1	150
59	Henare	2	0	149
60	Hanson	2	4	148
60	Raymond Rowe	2	4	148
60	Shane Haste	1	1	148
60	Mikey Nicholls	1	1	148
64	Kota Ibushi	1	0	142
65	Yoshiaki Fujiwara	1	2	139
66	Chase Owens	3	0	133
67	George Takano	1	1	119
67	Yujiro Takahashi	1	1	119
69	Big Van Vader	1	2	117
69	Crusher Bam Bam Bigelow	1	2	117
71	Jay Briscoe	1	2	113
71	Mark Briscoe	1	2	113
73	Tomoaki Honma	1	2	97
73	Taiyō Kea	1	0	97
75	Matt Taven	1	0	91
75	Michael Bennett	1	0	91
75	Kenta	2	0	91
78	Brutus Magnus	1	1	89
78	Doug Williams	1	1	89
80	Osamu Nishimura	2	1	84
81	Hiro Saito	1	2	70
82	Michiyoshi Ohara	1	1	62
82	Tatsutoshi Goto	1	1	62
84	Callum Newman	2	0	59
85	Hiromu Takahashi	1	0	53
86	Osamu Kido	1	1	49
87	Wataru Inoue	1	0	47
88	Jeff Cobb	3	0	45
89	Mark Davis	1	2	43
89	Kyle Fletcher	1	2	43
91	Bad Luck Fale	1	0	42
92	Katsuyori Shibata	1	0	38
92	El Phantasmo	1	0	38
92	Hikuleo	1	0	38
95	David Finlay	1	0	28
95	Juice Robinson	1	0	28
97	Tony Halme	1	0	22
