= Yoshihiro Takayama =

Japanese former professional wrestler and mixed martial arts fighter (born 1966)

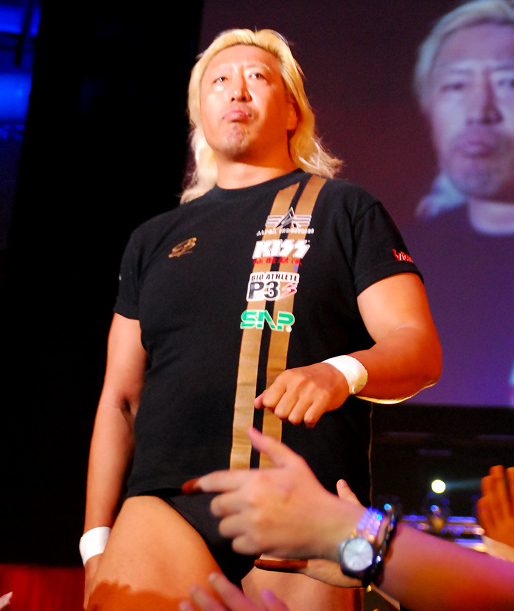
- Takayama in 2009

Personal information
- Born: September 19, 1966 (age 60) Sumida, Tokyo, Japan
- Children: 1

Professional wrestling career
- Ring name(s): Takan Hansen; Takayama; Yoshihiro Takayama
- Billed height: 2.01 m (6 ft 7 in)
- Billed weight: 125 kg (276 lb)
- Trained by: Giant Baba; Nobuhiko Takada
- Debut: June 28, 1992
- Retired: May 4, 2017 (last match to date)

Yoshihiro Takayama (高山 善廣, Takayama Yoshihiro; born September 19, 1966) is a Japanese former professional wrestler and mixed martial artist. Debuting for UWF International (UWFI) in the 1990s, Takayama joined All Japan Pro Wrestling (AJPW) in 1997 after UWF-i folded. In 2000, he joined Pro Wrestling Noah (Noah), and later became a mainstay in New Japan Pro-Wrestling (NJPW) where he arguably achieved his greatest success, holding the IWGP Heavyweight Championship and NWF Heavyweight Championship simultaneously in 2003. He is one of only five men to hold all three puroresu major heavyweight titles (New Japan Pro-Wrestling's IWGP Heavyweight Championship, All Japan Pro Wrestling's Triple Crown Heavyweight Championship, and Pro Wrestling Noah's GHC Heavyweight Championship), the others being Kensuke Sasaki, Keiji Muto, Satoshi Kojima, and Yuji Nagata.

Takayama first became known for his toughness after he began competing in mixed martial arts, when he took part in one of the most famous fights in MMA history at PRIDE 21 against Don Frye. Through his career Takayama had several career-threatening injuries, including a stroke after a match against Kensuke Sasaki in 2004. Takayama's career ended with a spinal cord injury in May 2017, which left him paralyzed from the shoulders down. After much rehabilitation, he gained some mobility in his upper body, being able to sit up without much assistance, but remains paralyzed to this day, using a motorized wheelchair for mobility.

== Professional wrestling career ==
=== Union of Wrestling Forces International (1992–1996) ===
A former rugby player, kendoka and lifeguard, Takayama started his professional wrestling career for shoot-style promotion Union of Wrestling Forces International (UWFI). Put under the tutelage of top star Nobuhiko Takada, Takayama debuted against Hiromitsu Kanehara and became a usual competitor of the Junior League Tournaments. In 1995, with the interpromotional feuds with New Japan Pro-Wrestling (NJPW) and WAR, he allied himself with Yoji Anjo and Kenichi Yamamoto to form the semi-serious "Golden Cups" stable. They competed extensively against NJPW representatives, most notably against Masahiro Chono's Ookami Gundan unit. The trio was famous for their involvement in comedic and parodic skits, like assuming masks in NJPW as the "200% Machines" to mock "Super Strong Machine" Junji Hirata, and playing a pop band gimmick to the point of releasing a CD album in July 1996. In WAR, they feuded with Gedo, Jado and Hiromichi Fuyuki, having several important matches against them.

=== All Japan Pro Wrestling (1997–2000) ===
After UWFI's subsequent collapse, he joined Kingdom, but after it also collapsed, he joined All Japan Pro Wrestling (AJPW) as a free agent along with former UWFi comrade Masahito Kakihara. In the beginning, Takayama was put in a feud with Toshiaki Kawada (against whom he had lost once in an interpromotional match before the UWFI's collapse), but as he lost matches often, he was back in the undercard. He and Kakihara joined former UWFI foreigner Gary Albright in a new version of the "Triangle of Power" stable Albright had formed with Steve Williams before he briefly went back to the United States. Kakihara left the group to partner with Mitsuharu Misawa and Yoshinari Ogawa to form the "Untouchables" stable, but the new T.O.P were soon joined by Takao Omori.

In 1999, upon Giant Baba's death, Mitsuharu Misawa made him and Kakihara full-time members of All Japan. Pushed as the No Fear team with Omori, Takayama found instant success, first winning the Asian tag team title from Hayabusa and Jinsei Shinzaki and then the Double Cup from Johnny Ace and Bart Gunn. However, they were eventually defeated by the combination of Misawa and Yoshinari Ogawa. In 2000, when Misawa announced plans for his new promotion, Pro Wrestling Noah, Takayama followed him.

=== Pro Wrestling Noah and freelance (2000–2017) ===
During the first few months of Noah's existence, Takayama competed in the first ever GHC Heavyweight Championship tournament, but lost to Mitsuharu Misawa in the final match. He found continued success in Noah, winning the new GHC Tag Team Championship with Takao Omori, too. It was around 2001 that, spurred by his old UWFI comrades' success in the PRIDE fighting circuit, Takayama decided to try his hand at mixed martial arts competition. He also competed in memorable Noah matches during 2002, winning the GHC Heavyweight Championship from Yoshinari Ogawa on September 7 before losing it to Mitsuharu Misawa later that month.

In 2001, Takayama declared free agency from Noah so he could pursue MMA, as well as matches in New Japan Pro-Wrestling, where he began challenging the top stars, such as Yuji Nagata, Masahiro Chono, and Hiroyoshi Tenzan. On May 9, 2002, during a tag match against Jun Akiyama and Yoshinobu Kanemaru, Omori suddenly attacked Takayama with his trademark Axe Bomber, and bid him "Goodbye", causing a no contest. Omori later explained the reason he did it was "if Takayama can pursue opportunities elsewhere, so can I". Then on May 26, Takayama teamed up with Takashi Sugiura to face Omori and Mohammed Yone, where Takayama beat his former partner with the Everest German Suplex for the win. In 2003 and 2004 he participated in New Japan's annual G1 Climax tournament. In mid-2004 he affiliated himself with former Pancrase wrestler Minoru Suzuki, and they won the IWGP Tag Team Championship, but he had a stroke later in the year following a brutal match with Kensuke Sasaki. During his time away from the ring, Takayama provided occasional colour commentary for Pro Wrestling Noah, famously saying, "I hope this never ends" during a chop exchange between Kenta Kobashi and Kensuke Sasaki on the July 18, 2005 "Destiny" show. In June 2006, Pro Wrestling Noah announced that Takayama would return at the July 16 Nippon Budokan show, and would team with Kenta Kobashi to take on Jun Akiyama and Mitsuharu Misawa. The match was later changed due to Kobashi needing surgery to remove a cancerous tumor, leading to Takayama teaming with Kensuke Sasaki against Akiyama and Misawa. However, when Kenta Kobashi returned, it would be in the same match, teaming with Yoshihiro Takayama to take on Jun Akiyama and Mitsuharu Misawa.

Takayama then started teaming with old UWFI comrade Takuma Sano in a tournament for the GHC Tag Team Championship vacated by Kenta Kobashi and Tamon Honda due to Kobashi's kidney tumor (Takayama and Sano would reach the final where they would lose to Muhammad Yone and Takeshi Morishima). On December 27, he showed up at a Pro Wrestling ZERO1-MAX show, attacked former partner Takao Omori, and promised to return at the next show.

Takayama defeated Great Muta on March 14, 2009, at Pro-Wrestling Love in Ryogoku Vol. 7 to win the Triple Crown Heavyweight Championship. With this victory, Takayama became the second wrestler (the other being Kensuke Sasaki) to win the three major heavyweight titles in Japan: NOAH's GHC Heavyweight Championship, New Japan's IWGP Heavyweight Championship, and All Japan's Triple Crown Heavyweight Championship. Takayama held the Triple Crown for almost seven months, losing the title to Satoshi Kojima on September 26.

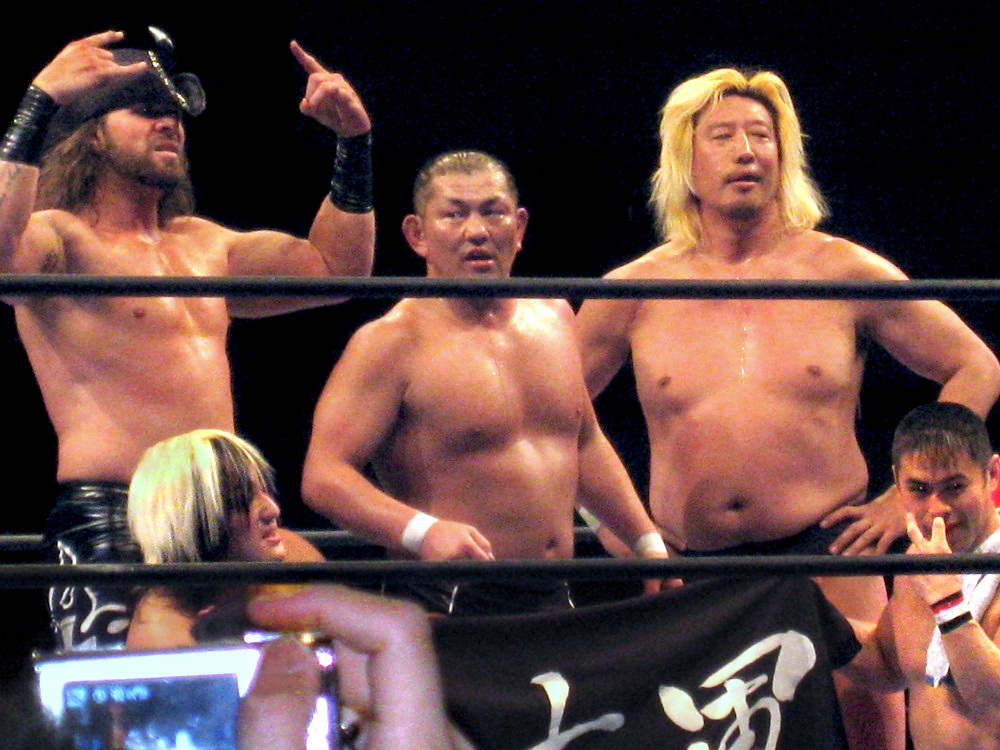
Takayama with Suzuki-gun in February 2012

On January 4, 2010, at Wrestle Kingdom IV in Tokyo Dome, Shinsuke Nakamura defeated Takayama to retain his IWGP Heavyweight Championship. In 2010, Takayama and Sano competed in NOAH's "Global Tag League" tournament and emerged the victors, however they were subsequently unable to dethrone the GHC Tag Team Champions Takeshi Rikio and Muhammad Yone.

From March 28 to May 2, 2010, Takayama competed in (and eventually won) Pro-Wrestling Noah's 1st ever Global League. He defeated Jun Akiyama in the final match of the tournament, finishing up with a total of 7 points. It was then announced that due to his victory, Takayama had earned a GHC Heavyweight Championship match versus Takashi Sugiura on July 10. On September 18, 2010, Takayama and Takuma Sano defeated Akitoshi Saito and Bison Smith to win the vacant GHC Tag Team Championship. On January 4, 2011, at New Japan's Wrestle Kingdom V in Tokyo Dome, Takayama and Sugiura defeated Hirooki Goto and Kazuchika Okada in a tag team match. Takayama and Sano would lose the GHC Tag Team Championship to New Japan's Giant Bernard and Karl Anderson on June 18, 2011, at Dominion 6.18 in a match contested also for the IWGP Tag Team Championship. In late 2011, Takayama began making appearances for New Japan Pro-Wrestling as a member of Minoru Suzuki's Suzuki-gun, which built to a match on January 4, 2012, at Wrestle Kingdom VI in Tokyo Dome, where he was defeated by Togi Makabe in a singles match. On March 18, Takayama and his Suzuki-gun stablemate, Lance Archer, unsuccessfully challenged Hiroyoshi Tenzan and Satoshi Kojima for the IWGP Tag Team Championship.

In 2016, Takayama began working primarily for DDT Pro-Wrestling, and in April 2017 won both the KO-D Tag Team Championship with Danshoku Dino and the Right to Challenge Anytime Anywhere contract for the KO-D Openweight Championship. He lost the contract to Yasu Urano on May 4, after a spinal cord injury during a match against his team (see below). Because of the injury, Takayama and Dino vacated the KO-D Tag Team Championship on May 9.

=== Paralysis (2017) ===
Takayama was injured at DDT's Toyonaka Love Story 2017 event on May 4, 2017, when he landed on his head when attempting a sunset flip on Yasu Urano during a six-man match pitting Takayama, Kazusada Higuchi and Shunma Katsumata against Urano, Harashima and Soma Takao. The match was ended immediately and Takayama was rushed to a hospital, where he was diagnosed with a "cervical spinal cord injury due to degenerative cervical spondylosis". For the following months, Takayama remained bedridden and was being taken care of by his wife and son, while the public was left unaware of the extent of his injury. On August 6, it was reported that the injury had left Takayama paralyzed from the neck down, ending his pro wrestling career. Takayama's situation was made public on September 4, when it was announced that he could now breathe on his own, but was still paralyzed from the shoulders down and was not expected to recover. DDT and Takayama's close friend Minoru Suzuki announced the creation of a foundation named "Takayamania", set to help Takayama and his family with his medical costs. Promotions across Japan came together to set up donation boxes for the foundation at their events.

== Mixed martial arts career ==
Yoshihiro Takayama
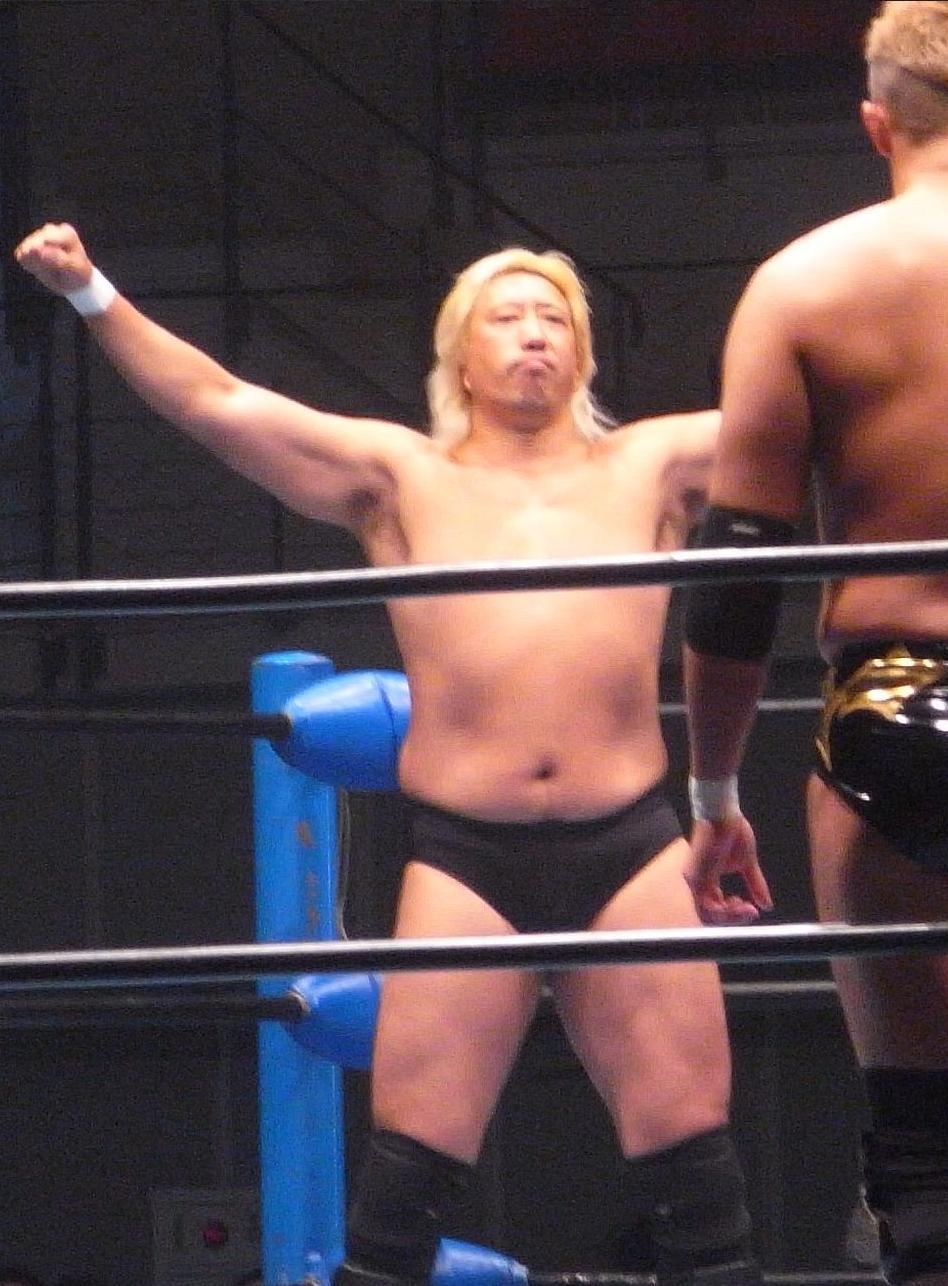
- Height: 2.01 m (6 ft 7 in)
- Weight: 253 lb (115 kg; 18 st 1 lb)
- Years active: 2001–2002

Mixed martial arts record
- Total: 5
- Wins: 1
- By knockout: 1
- Losses: 4
- By knockout: 2
- By submission: 2

Other information
- Mixed martial arts record from Sherdog

=== Pride Fighting Championships ===
Takayama had his anticipated debut in MMA at the event PRIDE 14 against fellow professional wrestler Kazuyuki Fujita. His performance would impress pundits by keeping the fight competitive despite the experience gap, as he escaped repeatedly from underneath the heavier Fujita and exchanged hard strikes in the muay thai clinch with him in the early minutes. Even though his stamina faltered later, which allowed Fujita to deliver multiple knee strikes to the head from a grounded position, Takayama survived to the second round, where he was finally put down by an arm triangle choke.

At PRIDE 18, he faced superheavyweight kickboxing champion Semmy Schilt in a valiant effort, but he was knocked out in short by his large opponent. However, Takayama would confirm the critics right at PRIDE 21 as a last time replacement. Although the event initially featured a hoped rematch between Ultimate Fighting Championship veterans Mark Coleman and Don Frye, the former was forced to pull out due to a serious neck injury, driving Takayama to accept to fill in two weeks before the bout.

Frye and Takayama faced off in what many PRIDE fans consider to be a classic. As soon as the fight started, both contenders assumed an identical, aggressive hockey punching-like strategy and turned the match into a brutal slugfest, each one holding the other's head with the left hand and unloading savage unblocked punches to the face with the right. Takayama managed to deliver a belly-to-belly suplex, and land a heavy knee, but Frye got up and both continued striking as previously. Later, after two minutes more of punching, the American finally overpowered Takayama and pounded him with hammerfists from the mount, leading the referee to stop the match.

Despite its untechnical nature, the fight was critically acclaimed and become one of the most talked about MMA matches ever. It appeared at number one on Fox Sports Network's "Best Damn 50 Beatdowns and was considered by critics "one of the greatest fights of all-time", "one of the finest moments in MMA history," and "the fiercest brawl in the history of the sport". After Takayama's retirement by paralysis in 2018, Frye published a message for him referring the fight, stating: "Takayama-san, God gave me the greatest opponent anybody could ever ask for, you. You made the greatest fight the world has ever seen. [...] You are the warrior we all look to be."

At Inoki Bom-Ba-Ye 2002, Takayama fought the 350-pound Bob Sapp. The fight was one-sided, with Sapp using his superior strength and size to mount Takayama and perform an armbar for the tap out.

At U-Spirits Again 2013, Takayama would have his last fight against Hikaru Sato, where he would win after delivering a suplex that knocked Sato out, giving Takayama his first and only mixed martial arts win. Though this fight has been disputed as being a professional wrestling match.

== Other media ==
Aside from professional wrestling, Takayama featured a sporadic music career. In summer 1996, as part of Golden Cups stable, Takayama participated in the group's official music debut with the CD album "Golden Cups Present... Oh Taco," containing the three wrestlers's entrance themes along with some covers and original songs. In 2009, Takayama appeared with Riki Choshu in the music video of King RIKI's tenth anniversary version of "Love Machine", posing as HUSTLE wrestlers flanking RIKI.

Takayama has acted in small parts in several films, beginning with Muscle Heat in 2002, and continuing with Cromartie High - The Movie and Nagurimono in 2005. He also appeared in 2004's The Calamari Wrestler, playing himself in a cameo role. He also voiced the character Canis Major Sirious in the Saint Seiya OVA trilogy The Hades Chapter. He is credited as "Large Man" in Martin Scorsese's 2016 film Silence.

== Championships and accomplishments ==
- All Japan Pro Wrestling
  - All Asia Tag Team Championship (1 time) – with Takao Omori
  - Triple Crown Heavyweight Championship (1 time)
  - World Tag Team Championship (1 time) – with Takao Omori
- Chō Hanabi Puroresu
  - Bakuha-ō Championship (1 time)
- DDT Pro-Wrestling
  - KO-D Tag Team Championship (1 time) – with Danshoku Dino
- New Japan Pro-Wrestling
  - IWGP Heavyweight Championship (1 time)
  - IWGP Tag Team Championship (1 time) – with Minoru Suzuki
  - NWF Heavyweight Championship (1 time)
- Nikkan Sports
  - Match of the Year (2007) with Kenta Kobashi vs. Jun Akiyama and Mitsuharu Misawa on December 2
  - Wrestler of the Year (2003)
- Pro Wrestling Illustrated
  - Ranked No. 27 of the top 500 singles wrestlers in the PWI 500 in 2002
- Pro Wrestling Noah
  - GHC Heavyweight Championship (1 time)
  - GHC Tag Team Championship (2 times) – with Takao Omori (1) and Takuma Sano (1)
  - Two Days Tag Tournament (2011) with Kenta
  - Global League (2010)
  - Global Tag League (2010) - with Takuma Sano
  - Global Tag League (2013) - with Kenta
  - Global Tag League Fighting Spirit Award (2014) - with KENTA
- Pro Wrestling Zero1
  - NWA Intercontinental Tag Team Championship (1 time) – with Kohei Sato
- Tenryu Project
  - Tenryu Project 6-Man Tag Team Championship (2 time) - with Yoji Anjo and Kenichi Yamamoto, Tatsutoshi Goto and Daisuke Sekimoto
  - Mizuchi-R (2014) – with Ryuichi Kawakami
- Tokyo Sports
  - Best Tag Team Award (2004) with Minoru Suzuki
  - Match of the Year Award (2002) vs. Yuji Nagata
  - Match of the Year Award (2007) with Kenta Kobashi vs. Mitsuharu Misawa and Jun Akiyama
  - MVP Award (2003)
  - Outstanding Performance Award (2002)
- Wrestle Association "R"
  - WAR World Six-Man Tag Team Championship (1 time) – with Yoji Anjo and Kenichi Yamamoto
- Wrestling Observer Newsletter
  - Best Brawler (2002)
  - Fight of the Year (2002) vs. Don Frye

== Mixed martial arts record ==
Professional record breakdown
6 matches	1 win	5 losses
By knockout	1	2
By submission	0	3
By decision	0	0
Draws	0	

Res.	Record	Opponent	Method	Event	Date	Round	Time	Location	Notes
Win	1–5	Hikaru Sato	KO (slam)	U-Spirits Again, Korakuen Hall	March 9, 2013	1	4:26	Tokyo, Japan	
Loss	0–5	Bob Sapp	Submission (armbar)	Inoki Bom-Ba-Ye 2002	December 31, 2002	1	2:16	Saitama, Saitama, Japan	
Loss	0–4	Don Frye	TKO (punches)	Pride 21	June 23, 2002	1	6:10	Saitama, Saitama, Japan	Fight of the Year (2002).
Loss	0–3	Semmy Schilt	KO (punches)	Pride 18	December 23, 2001	1	3:09	Fukuoka Prefecture, Japan	
Loss	0–2	Kazuyuki Fujita	Submission (arm triangle choke)	Pride 14	May 27, 2001	2	3:10	Yokohama, Japan	
Loss	0–1	Kimo Leopoldo	Submission (rear-naked choke)	Meiji Jingu Stadium Open Air MMA	August 17, 1996	1	1:20	Tokyo, Japan	

== Filmography ==
Year	Title	Role	Notes
2002	Muscle Heat	Muscle Dome Wrestler	
2002	Saint Seiya: The Hades Chapter	Canis Major Sirius	Voice
2004	The Calamari Wrestler	Himself	Cameo
2005	Nagurimono	Tetsufu	
2005	Cromartie High – The Movie	Yutaka Takenouchi	
2005	Crusher Kazuyoshi	Himself/Takayama	
2014	Tokyo Tribe	Bodyguard	
2016	Silence	Large Man	
