= Heisei Ishingun =

Professional wrestling stable

Stable
- Members: Shiro Koshinaka; Kengo Kimura; Kuniaki Kobayashi; Masashi Aoyagi; Akitoshi Saito; Great Kabuki; Akira Nogami; Tatsutoshi Goto; Michiyoshi Ohara; Genichiro Tenryu
- Name(s): "Heisei Ishingun" (Force of Peace) "Han-Senshukai Dōmei" (Anti-Wrestlers Alliance)
- Debut: 1992
- Disbanded: 1999

Heisei Ishingun was a Japanese professional wrestling stable led by Shiro Koshinaka during the 1990s, primarily in New Japan Pro-Wrestling.

== History ==
After an intense feud with each other early from 1988, Shiro Koshinaka and Kuniaki Kobayashi formed a tag team, and feuded with many other teams from 1988 to 1992. Between those rivalries, they feuded with Masashi Aoyagi and Akitoshi Saito who were karate fighters, to prove which sport was the best. After defeating them many times, Kobayashi, Koshinaka, Saito and Aoyagi formed a stable. Kengo Kimura and the Great Kabuki from WAR soon joined the group. In 1993, they were initially called Han-Senshukai Dōmei (Anti-Wrestlers Alliance) referring to WAR and Genichiro Tenryu. After this feud was over, they changed their name to Heisei Ishingun, after Riki Choshu's Shōwa period Ishin Gundan stable.

In 1993, Michiyoshi Ohara and Tatsutoshi Goto joined the group and helped Koshinaka against main eventers. In 1994, Aoyagi left to return to Frontier Martial-Arts Wrestling. In 1996, after the J-J-Jacks split up, Akira Nogami joined, while Kabuki left. Kimura partially left in late 1996 to re-form his old team with Tatsumi Fujinami as well, but served as an associate until their dissolution. In 1997, Goto and Ohara briefly left for nWo Japan who were feuding with the Ishingun; however, both men did not make any progress inside the unit and were kicked out by Keiji Mutoh and Masahiro Chono, and were accepted back by Koshinaka into the Ishingun. In 1998, Saito left the group and professional wrestling to focus on his bartending business, while Genichiro Tenryu joined in and took his place in the group. In mid-1999, Heisei Ishingun disbanded as Goto, Nogami and Ohara joined Masahiro Chono's Team 2000. Koshinaka went back to being an NJPW loyalist, while Kobayashi and Kimura retired and Tenryu, a de facto free agent, continued supporting NJPW loyalists in their battles against Team 2000.

During their time as a group, Heisei Ishingun feuded with wrestlers from New Japan Pro-Wrestling, WAR, UWF International, and nWo Japan.

On February 8, 2017, Akira, Akitoshi Saito, The Great Kabuki, Masashi Aoyagi and Shiro Koshinaka made a one-night reunion as Heisei Ishingun under Keiji Mutoh's Pro-Wrestling Masters banner.

The group once again had a one night reunion on October 1, 2017, when Akitoshi Saito and Shiro Koshinaka teamed with Maybach Taniguchi to defeat Mitsuya Nagai, Tatsumi Fujinami and Leona at Pro Wrestling Noah’s Great Voyage in Yokohama.

== Heisei Ishingun members ==
- Shiro Koshinaka (1992–1999) - leader
- Kuniaki Kobayashi (1992–1999) - co-leader
- Masashi Aoyagi (1992–1994)
- Akitoshi Saito (1992–1998)
- Kengo Kimura (1992–1999) - semi-associate after 1997
- Great Kabuki (1992–1996)
- Michiyoshi Ohara (1993–1999)
- Tatsutoshi Goto (1993–1999)
- Akira Nogami (1996–1999)
- Genichiro Tenryu (1998–1999)

== Championships and accomplishments ==
- WAR World Six-Man Tag Team Championship (Goto, Koshinaka & Ohara)
- One Night Tag Team Tournament Winner (1996) (Ohara & Nogami)
- IWGP Tag Team Championship (Koshinaka & Tenryu)
