= Bad Ass Translate Trading =

Professional wrestling stable

Stable
- Members: Keiji Mutoh (leader); Taiyo Kea; Jinsei Shinzaki; Hiroshi Hase; Don Frye; Shinjiro Otani
- Name(s): BATT; Bad Ass Translate Trading
- Debut: 2001
- Disbanded: 2002

Bad Ass Translate Trading (BATT) was a professional wrestling stable led by Keiji Mutoh, which competed in both New Japan Pro-Wrestling and All Japan Pro Wrestling from 2001 to 2002. The name of the group meant that it was a group of wrestlers that crossed borders. The groups is best known for the fact that its members were from different promotions: New Japan (Mutoh, Frye, & Otani), All Japan (Kea & Hase), and Michinoku Pro (Shinzaki).

== History ==
In January 2001, Keiji Mutoh and Shinjiro Otani both made returns to New Japan after spending much of the year 2000 on learning excursions, with Mutoh being in the United States for World Championship Wrestling, and Otani being in Canada and England for various promotions. The two made their return at Wrestling World 2001 as the two defeated Jushin Thunder Liger and Manabu Nakanishi in less than 6 minutes. At the Fighting Spirit 2001 tour, Mutoh and Otani continued to team up and formed an alliance. On February 3, 2001, Mutoh and Otani defeated Masahiro Chono and Don Frye after Frye turned on Chono, a few days later on February 11, Frye officially joined with Mutoh and Otani. On February 18, 2001, All Japan's Taiyo Kea and Michinoku Pro's Jinsei Shinzaki also became official members when they assisted Mutoh in a match against Kazunari Murakami, however, Ohtani would leave New Japan and BATT after the February 18 Sumo Hall show to join Pro Wrestling ZERO1.

Beginning in March 2001, Mutoh renewed his feud with Chono and Team 2000. On March 17, Mutoh officially named his group BATT (Bad Ass Translate Trading) and at the same show, former New Japan wrestler and Mutoh's former tag team partner: Hiroshi Hase joined the group. After exchanging victories against Team 2000 during the spring and early summer, the group would win their first title on June 8, 2001 when Mutoh defeated Genichiro Tenryu to win the Triple Crown Heavyweight Championship.

Despite winning the Triple Crown, the group would see several setbacks at Dome Quake on July 20, 2001, Kea and Shinzaki would fail to win the IWGP Tag Team Championship, Mutoh would fall to Chono, and Frye would fail to win the IWGP Heavyweight Championship. A few weeks later, Mutoh would enter the 2001 G1 Climax, making all the way to the finals but would ultimately lose to Yuji Nagata.

BATT would bounce back in the fall as Frye would win the G1 World Climax Tournament but left New Japan shortly after to return to Mixed Martial Arts. On October 8, 2001 BATT main evented New Japan's Indicate of Next as Mutoh and Hase lost to Nagata and Jun Akiyama. A few weeks later on October 22, 2001, Mutoh and Kea would defeat Genichiro Tenryu and Yoji Anjo to win the World Tag Team Championship. Six days later on October 28, Mutoh and Kea defeated Tatsumi Fujinami and Osamu Nishimura in a title vs. title match to win the IWGP Tag Team Championship. In December 2001, Mutoh and Kea would continue their dominance as they would win the 2001 World's Strongest Tag Determination League given BATT their third tag team achievement in two months.

== Breakup and aftermath ==
In January 2002, Keiji Mutoh shocked the Japanese Wrestling World by leaving for All Japan. Due to this, New Japan ended its business relationship with All Japan and BATT broke up with all the wrestlers returned to their promotions and Mutoh and Kea were stripped of the IWGP Tag Team Titles. After joining All Japan, Mutoh would lose the Triple Crown to Toshiaki Kawada on February 24, 2002. Despite BATT having broken up, Mutoh and Kea would continue to defend the Unified World Tag Team Championship until they lost the titles to KroniK on July 17, 2002. Afterwards, the tag team would break up. Two years later, on July 10, 2004, Mutoh and Kea would reunite at Pro Wrestling NOAH's first Tokyo Dome show, Departure 2004, as they challenged Mitsuharu Misawa and Yoshinari Ogawa for the GHC Tag Team Championship, but they failed to win the title.

== Championships and accomplishments ==
- All Japan Pro Wrestling
  - Triple Crown Heavyweight Championship (1 time) - Mutoh
  - World Tag Team Championship (1 time) - Mutoh & Kea
  - World's Strongest Tag Determination League (2001) - Mutoh & Kea
- New Japan Pro-Wrestling
  - IWGP Tag Team Championship (1 time) - Mutoh & Kea
  - G1 World Climax (2001) - Frye
  - Wrestler of the Year (2001) - Mutoh
  - Match of the Year (2001) - Mutoh vs. Yuji Nagata on August 12
  - Tag Team Match of the Year (2001) Mutoh and Hase vs. Jun Akiyama and Yuji Nagata on October 8
- Nikkan Sports
  - Wrestler of the Year (2001) - Mutoh
  - Match of the Year (2001) - Mutoh and Hase vs. Jun Akiyama and Yuji Nagata on October 8
  - Fighting Spirit (2001) - Kea
- Tokyo Sports
  - Wrestler of the Year (2001) - Mutoh
- Wrestling Observer Newsletter
  - Best Wrestling Maneuver (2001) - Mutoh Shining Wizard
  - Match of the Year (2001) - Mutoh vs. Genichiro Tenryu on June 8, Tokyo, Japan
  - Most Improved Wrestler (2001) - Mutoh
  - Wrestler of the Year (2001) - Mutoh
