= Knock Out Brothers =

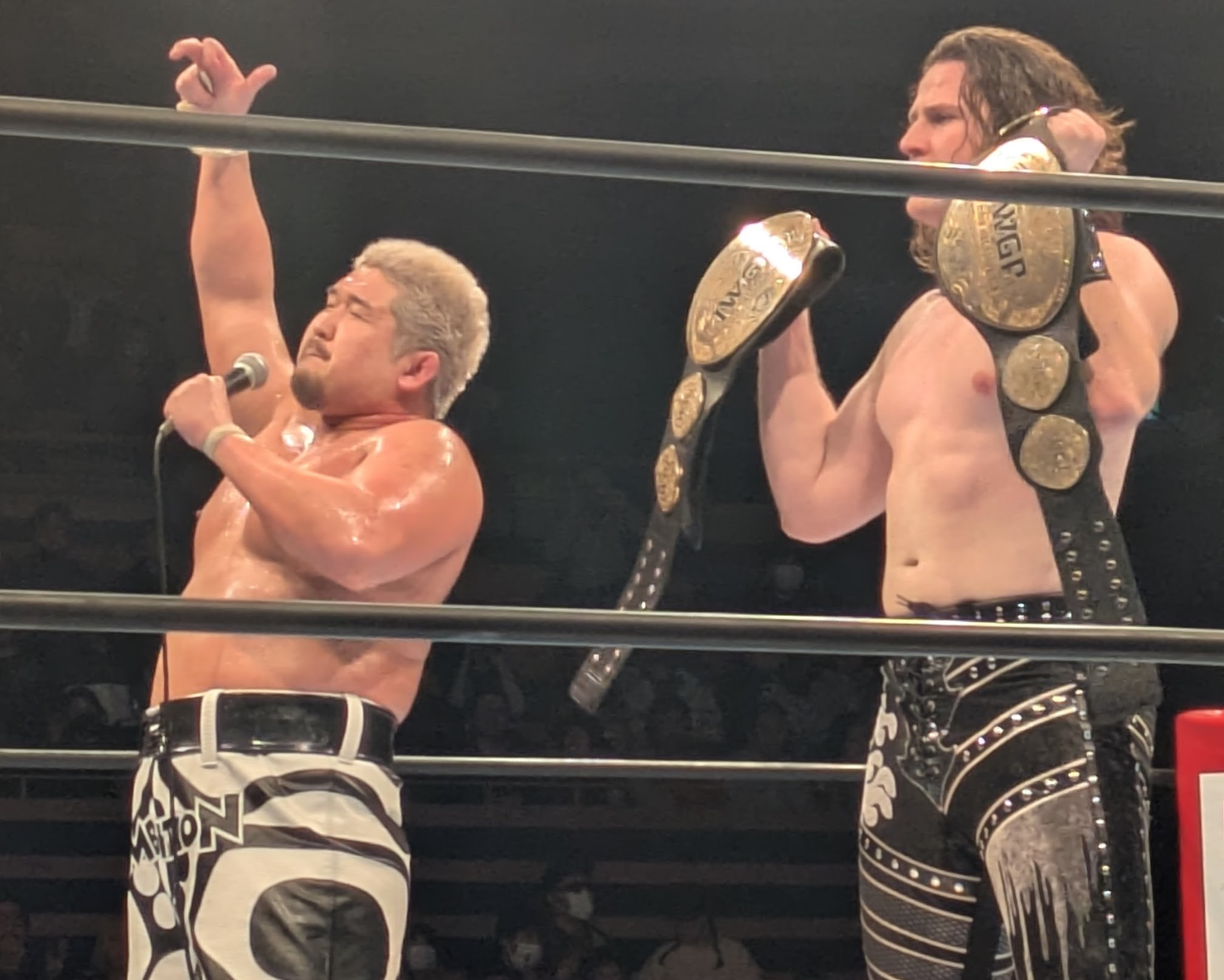
- Yuto-Ice (left) and Oskar (right) in 2026

Tag team
- Members: Yuto-Ice/Yuto Nakashima; Oskar/Oskar Leube
- Name(s): Knock Out Brothers; Young Blood
- Years active: 2024–present

Knock Out Brothers (K.O.B.) are a professional wrestling tag team consisting of Yuto-Ice and Oskar. They are signed to New Japan Pro-Wrestling (NJPW), where they are members of Unbound Co. and the current IWGP Tag Team Champions in their second reign. They are also two-thirds of the NEVER Openweight 6-Man Tag Team Champions with Jeff Cobb, in their first reign as a team and individually.

== Career ==
=== New Japan Pro-Wrestling (2023–present) ===
In 2023, Oskar Leube and Yuto Nakashima formed a tag team known as "Young Blood" in New Japan Pro-Wrestling (NJPW). In January 2024 at New Year Dash!!, Young Blood wrestled their final match as young lions before embarking on learning excursion (as is customary for NJPW Young Lions), losing to El Phantasmo and Hikuleo.

After departing, Young Blood officially began their excursion with European promotions at Revolution Pro Wrestling's High Stakes 2024 event. They also worked with the German promotion Westside Xtreme Wrestling (wXw), winning the wXw World Tag Team Championship at the World Tag Team Festival in October 2024, defeating KXS (Axel Tischer and Fast Time Moodo) in the finals. In March 2025, they lost the titles to Big Bucks (Alex Duke and Norman Harras), ending their reign at 152 days.

On the final night of G1 Climax 35 on August 17, 2025, Bullet Club War Dogs leader David Finlay introduced Nakashima (now known as Yuto-Ice) and Leube (now known as Oskar) as Knock Out Brothers and the newest members of Bullet Club War Dogs. At Destruction in Kobe, Yuto and Oskar defeated Taichi and Tomohiro Ishii to win the IWGP Tag Team Championship, marking their first championship in NJPW. After Wrestle Kingdom 20, at New Year Dash!!, David Finlay and Yota Tsuji announced the dissolution of Bullet Club and Mushozoku, replacing the alliance with Unbound Co., which was a complete merger; also in the main event of the show they defeated Ryohei Oiwa and Zack Sabre Jr. to retain the IWGP Tag Team Championship. Knock Out Brothers would go on to sucussefully defened their titles against various teams such as RoughStorm, TMDK, and Bishamon. On June 14 at Dominion 6.14 in Osaka-jo Hall, Knock Out Brothers lost the titles to United Empire's Great-O-Khan and Henare, ending their reign at 259 days. They regained the titles from O-Khan and Henare on October 6 during the Road to King of Pro-Wrestling tour. On October 12 at King of Pro-Wrestling, Yuto-Ice, Oskar and Jeff Cobb defeated Will Ospreay, Henare and O-Khan to win the NEVER Openweight Six-Man Tag Team Championship

== Championships and accomplishments ==
- New Japan Pro-Wrestling
  - IWGP Tag Team Championship (2 times, current)
  - NEVER Openweight 6-Man Tag Team Championship (1 time, current) – with Jeff Cobb
- Pro Wrestling Holland
  - PWH Tag Team Championship (1 time)
- Westside Xtreme Wrestling
  - wXw World Tag Team Championship (1 time)
  - wXw World Tag Team Festival (2024)
- Tokyo Sports
  - Best Tag Team Award (2025)
