= Hiro Saito =

Japanese professional wrestler

Personal information
- Born: Hiroyuki Saito; May 25, 1961 (age 65) Kawasaki, Kanagawa, Japan

Professional wrestling career
- Ring name: Hiro Saito
- Billed height: 1.75 m (5 ft 9 in)
- Billed weight: 97 kg (214 lb)
- Trained by: Tokyo Joe
- Debut: August 26, 1978
- Retired: February 28, 2020

Hiroyuki Saito (斎藤 弘幸, Saitō Hiroyuki; born May 25, 1961 in Kawasaki, Japan) is a Japanese professional wrestler best known by the shortened name of Hiro Saito (ヒロ 斉藤, Hiro Saitō). He was the first AJPW World Junior Heavyweight Champion.

== Professional wrestling career ==
A former judoka, Hiro debuted in 1978 in New Japan Pro-Wrestling (NJPW). In May 1985, he defeated The Cobra to win the WWF Junior Heavyweight Championship only to lose back to him 2 months later. Saito went on to defeat The Cobra for the NWA World Junior Heavyweight Championship on July 28, 1985, only to lose the title right back to him the same night.

Saito soon jumped to All Japan Pro Wrestling (AJPW), where he formed the "Calgary Hurricanes" with Shunji Takano. He competed in the All Japan World Junior Heavyweight Championship tournament in July 1986 where he defeated Brad Armstrong in the final to become the first World Junior Heavyweight Champion. After four months as champion, Saito lost the title to former stablemate Kuniaki Kobayashi.

Saito joined the group known as the Raging Staff and soon won the IWGP World Tag Team Championship with Super Strong Machine from Hiroshi Hase and Kensuke Sasaki in December 1990, which they held for 3 months until Hase and Sasaki won them back in March 1991. After Raging Staff dispersed, Saito joined Team Wolf with Masahiro Chono and Hiroyoshi Tenzan, and was later part of nWo Japan.

In 2006, after spending many years in relegation, Saito quit New Japan once again and began appearing for Tatsumi Fujinami's Muga promotion.

Saito returned to New Japan once again on January 4, 2017, at Wrestle Kingdom 11, participating in the New Japan Rumble before being eliminated by Michael Elgin. The following day, Saito reformed Team 2000 for one night only along with former members Satoshi Kojima, Scott Norton and Hiroyoshi Tenzan as well as Cheeseburger to defeat Bullet Club (Kenny Omega, Bad Luck Fale, Tama Tonga, Tanga Loa and Bone Soldier).

Hiro Saito was the first Japanese wrestler to use and popularize the "diving senton", or seating splash off the top rope, in matches. He is not related to Masa Saito, despite sharing name and appearance (aside from the blond hair); Hiroyuki shortened his name to "Hiro" to copy him (since Masa Saito's real name is Masanori) and also as a meaning of sharing fortune ("good luck").

In his last recorded match, for Keiji Muto's Wrestle-1 offshoot Pro Wrestling Masters circuit, on February 28, 2020, Saito and Yutaka Yoshie defeated the combination of Shinjiro Otani and Tatsuhito Takaiwa.

== Championships and accomplishments ==
- All Japan Pro Wrestling
  - NWA World Junior Heavyweight Championship (1 time)
  - World Junior Heavyweight Championship (1 time, inaugural)
  - World Junior Heavyweight Championship Tournament (1986)
- New Japan Pro-Wrestling
  - IWGP Tag Team Championship (1 time) – with Super Strong Machine
  - WWF Junior Heavyweight Championship (1 time)
  - Teisen Hall Cup Six Man Tag Team Tournament (2003) – with Shinsuke Nakamura and Tatsutoshi Goto
- Tokyo Sports
  - Best Tag Team Award (1996) – with Hiroyoshi Tenzan and Masahiro Chono
- Wrestling Observer Newsletter
  - Best Gimmick (1996) – nWo
  - Feud of the Year (1996) New World Order vs. World Championship Wrestling
