= Junji Hirata =

Japanese professional wrestler

Personal information
- Born: December 20, 1956 (age 69) Hiratsuka, Kanagawa, Japan

Professional wrestling career
- Ring name(s): Junji Hirata; Sonny Two Rivers; Strong Machine #1; Super Strong Machine; Makai #1; Black Strong Machine; Super Love Machine; Super Strong Azteca Machine
- Billed height: 1.83 m (6 ft 0 in)
- Billed weight: 115 kg (254 lb)
- Billed from: "Unknown"
- Trained by: Tokyo Joe
- Debut: August 26, 1978
- Retired: June 19, 2018

Junji Hirata (平田 淳嗣, Hirata Junji) (born December 20, 1956) is a Japanese retired professional wrestler currently working as a trainer for the New Japan Pro-Wrestling (NJPW) promotion, known primarily by his ring name Super Strong Machine (スーパー・ストロング・マシン, Sūpā Sutorongu Mashin).

== Professional wrestling career ==
Hirata applied and was approved to the New Japan dojo on May 13, 1978, and made his debut for New Japan Pro-Wrestling (NJPW) on August 26, against Yoshiaki Fujiwara. In November 1982, he left on an overseas training expedition to Mexico, and later Canada, where in Stu Hart's Stampede Wrestling he would create the famous Super Strong Machine persona, as well as use a First Nations gimmick as Sonny Two Rivers (billed as the son of Billy Two Rivers, an actual First Nations chief). In April 1986, he left NJPW with Riki Choshu for rival wrestling promotion, All Japan Pro Wrestling (AJPW). In June 1987, he returned to NJPW and would soon capture the IWGP Tag Team Championship on three occasions with George Takano, Hiro Saito, and Shinya Hashimoto as his tag team partners.

In the fall of 1986, the World Wrestling Federation introduced a stable of wrestlers called The Machines -- "The Giant Machine" (André the Giant), "Big Machine" (Blackjack Mulligan), and "Super Machine" (Bill Eadie) -- based on Junji Hirata's popular Super Strong Machine gimmick. In 1984, Hirata had tried to make his own "Machines" stable with Korean wrestler Yang Seung-hi and veteran Yasu Fuji as Strong Machine #2 and Strong Machine #3 respectively, but this version of the stable did not have the exposure or push of their American counterparts. Hirata briefly turned face and became "Super" Strong Machine, feuding with his former partners. When Hirata left for Japan Pro, Fuji retired and Yang went back to South Korea.

In December 1994, after Masahiro Chono turned on him, he finally unmasked, dropping the Super Strong Machine character and wrestling under his real name. He revived the Super Strong Machine persona for the first time in six years in October 2000, having a brief feud with T2000 Machine (Tatsutoshi Goto). In 2005, Hirata, as the masked persona of Black Strong Machine, became a regular fixture on NJPW shows reconciled with Chono and part of his Black New Japan stable. He also had a brief stint in AJPW as Super Love Machine, the leader of the Love Machines, this time taking as partners Arashi as Love Machine Storm and Gran Hamada as Mini Love Machine.

In the late 2000s, Hirata was a founding member of the Legend and Seigigun stables. He wrestled his final match on April 2, 2014, at Wataru Inoue's retirement event. He now works as a trainer at the NJPW Dojo. On April 12, 2018, it was announced that he was retiring from active competition. His retirement ceremony was held on June 19 at Korakuen Hall.

=== Kizuna Road 2018 (June 19) ~Super Strong Machine Retirement Ceremony~ - Korakuen Hall, Tokyo, Japan ===
No.	Results	Stipulations	Times
1	Bullet Club (Yujiro Takahashi & Taiji Ishimori) defeated Kushida & Ren Narita	Tag Team match	8:35
2	Togi Makabe, Jyushin Thunder Liger & Tiger Mask defeated Toa Henare, Tomoyuki Oka & Shota Umino	Six-man Tag Team match	7:57
3	Suzuki-gun (Yoshinobu Kanemaru, El Desperado & Taka Michinoku) defeated Roppongi 3K (Rocky Romero, Yoh & Sho)	Six-man Tag Team match	6:50
4	Chaos (Tomohiro Ishii & Toru Yano) defeated Suzuki-gun (Takashi Iizuka & Taichi)	Tag Team match	9:35
5	Chaos (Kazuchika Okada, Hirooki Goto, Jay White & Yoshi-Hashi) defeated Michael Elgin, Jeff Cobb & FinJuice (Juice Robinson & David Finlay)	Eight-man Tag Team match	14:51
6	Super Strong Machine Ace, Super Strong Machine Buffalo, Super Strong Machine Justice, Super Strong Machine Don & Super Strong Machine No. 69 (with Super Strong Machine) defeated Los Ingobernables de Japón (Tetsuya Naito, Evil, Sanada, Bushi & Hiromu Takahashi)	Super Strong Machine Retirement Commemorative Ten-man Tag Team match	15:33

== Personal life ==
Hirata's son trained in the Dragon Gate Dojo and debuted for the promotion in 2019 under the name Strong Machine J. He formed the Strong Machine Dantai with Strong Machine F (Don Fujii), Strong Machine G (Gamma), and Strong Machine K (Shuji Kondo).

== Championships and accomplishments ==
- All Japan Pro Wrestling
  - All Asia Tag Team Championship (1 time) – with Ashura Hara
- New Japan Pro-Wrestling
  - IWGP Tag Team Championship (3 times) – with George Takano (1), Hiro Saito (1) and Shinya Hashimoto (1)
- Polynesian Pacific Championship Wrestling
  - NWA Polynesian Pacific Heavyweight Championship (1 time)
- Pro Wrestling Illustrated
  - PWI ranked him #105 of the 500 best singles wrestlers of the year in the PWI 500 in 1997
- Stampede Wrestling
  - Stampede British Commonwealth Mid-Heavyweight Championship (1 time)
