= Shiro Koshinaka =

Japanese professional wrestler (born 1958)

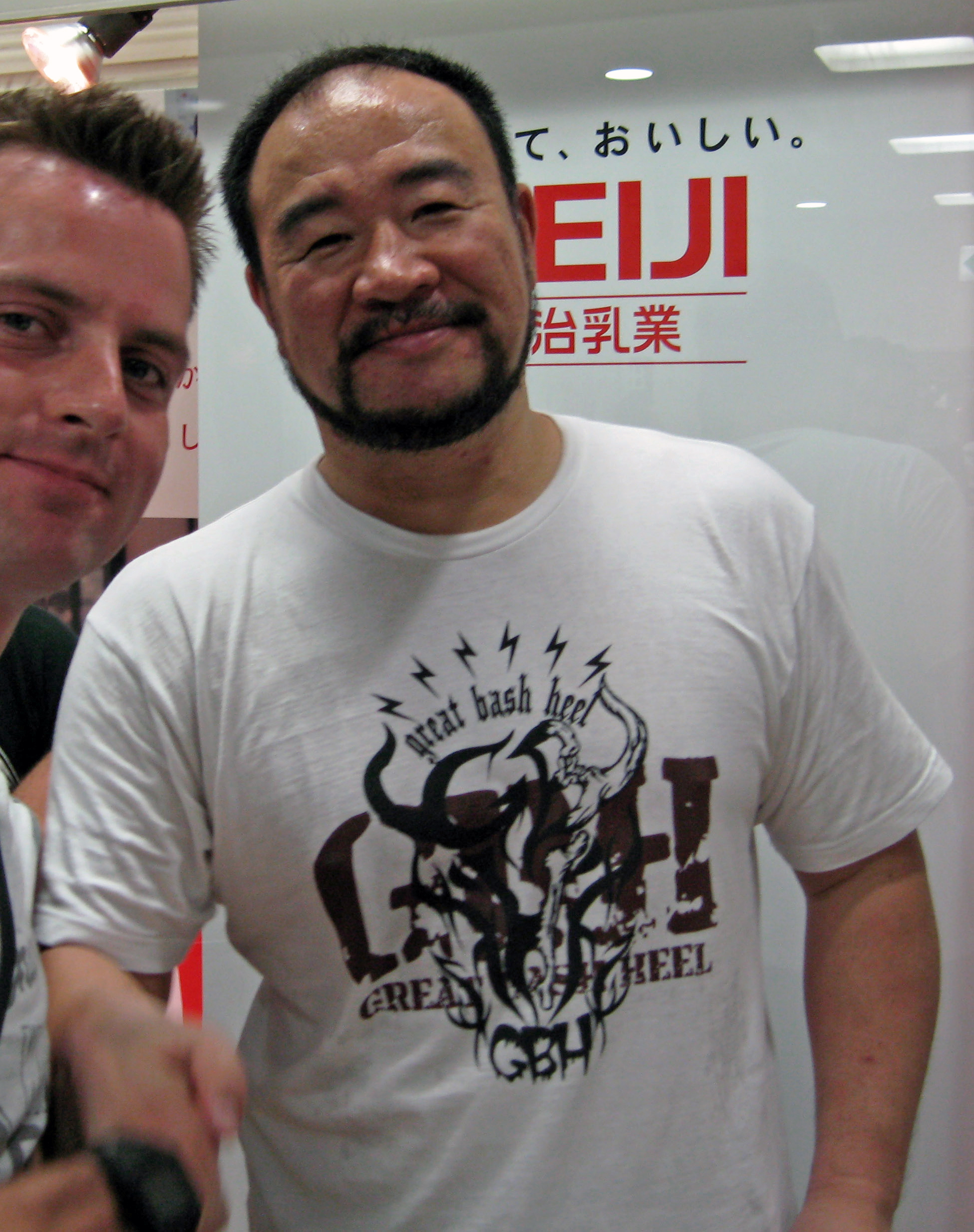
- Koshinaka in 2007

Personal information
- Born: September 3, 1958 (age 67) Tokyo, Japan

Professional wrestling career
- Ring name(s): Shiro Koshinaka; Samurai Shiro
- Billed height: 1.85 m (6 ft 1 in)
- Billed weight: 105 kg (231 lb)
- Trained by: Giant Baba; Kazuharu Sonoda
- Debut: March 5, 1979

Shiro Koshinaka (越中 詩郎, Koshinaka Shirō; born September 3, 1958) is a Japanese professional wrestler who has competed in All Japan Pro Wrestling (AJPW), New Japan Pro-Wrestling (NJPW) and Wrestle Association "R" (WAR) during the 1980s and 1990s. He was also the first IWGP Junior Heavyweight Champion.

== Career ==
=== All Japan Pro Wrestling (1979–1985) ===
After working for an electric power company for a year after graduating high school, Shiro Koshinaka enrolled in the All Japan Pro Wrestling Dojo in August 1978, training under Giant Baba and Kazuharu Sonoda. After months of training, on March 5, 1979, he debuted against one of his trainers, Kazuharu Sonoda.

In his first two years, Koshinaka would only gain victories in battle royals, while losing in singles matches to guys like Atsushi Onita, Masanobu Fuchi, Mitsuo Momota, Tor Hayashi, Munenori Higo, Lee Wang-pyo, and Yoshihiro Momota, before gaining his first victory in February 1981 against Masaji Goto. In 1983, Koshinaka defeated Mitsuharu Misawa to win the Lou Thesz Cup, his first tournament.

In 1984, Koshinaka went on an excursion to Mexico, wrestling as Samurai Shiro in Empresa Mexicana de la Lucha Libre, where in July, he lost a Hair vs. Hair match to El Satanico. While AJPW pushed Misawa, the man Koshinaka beat to win the Lou Thesz Cup the year before, as the second incarnation of Tiger Mask, Koshinaka was lingering in EMLL in Mexico. Frustrated, Koshinaka left AJPW in August 1985.

=== New Japan Pro-Wrestling (1985–2003) ===
After his excursion in Mexico, Koshinaka joined New Japan Pro-Wrestling in September 1985. On February 6, 1986, he defeated The Cobra in a tournament to become the inaugural IWGP Junior Heavyweight Champion. At the same time, NJPW was in a feud with the shoot-style UWF promotion, and Koshinaka was immediately put in a feud with Nobuhiko Takada, who at one time was Antonio Inoki's protégé, just like Koshinaka was Giant Baba's. Koshinaka lost the title to Takada on May 19, 1986, but regained the title exactly four months later on September 19, 1986.

While reigning as IWGP Junior Heavyweight Champion, he formed a tag team with Keiji Mutoh in a bid to win the IWGP Tag Team Championship, which was vacated by Tatsumi Fujinami and Kengo Kimura in February 1987. On March 20, 1987, Koshinaka and Mutoh defeated Takada and Akira Maeda to win the vacant titles, making Koshinaka a double champion, but the tag team title reign didn't last as he and Mutoh lost the titles to Takada and Maeda in a rematch nearly a week later, on March 26, 1987. On August 2, 1987, Koshinaka vacated the Junior Heavyweight title due to an ankle injury. When he returned that fall, Koshinaka slowly rebounded, but the rebound was big when he won the first Top of the Super Juniors league in 1988, defeating Hiroshi Hase, the reigning IWGP Junior Heavyweight Champion at the time, in the finals on February 7, 1988, earning him a title shot against Hase on March 19, 1988, but lost. He tried again to wrest the Junior Heavyweight title from Hase on May 8, 1988, but failed again. Finally, on June 24, 1988, the third time was the charm, as Koshinaka finally won his third and final IWGP Junior Heavyweight title from Owen Hart. He would hold on to the title, before losing the title to Hase on March 16, 1989.

As a new decade began, Koshinaka graduated to the Heavyweight division. In August 1990, he went to Austria to Otto Wanz's Catch Wrestling Association to challenge Steve Wright for the CWA World Middleweight Championship, but failed, as he lost on the tenth round. Returning to Japan in September 1990, he was the very first opponent for Mutoh's alter-ego, The Great Muta, and also joined Tatsumi Fujinami's Dragon Bombers.

In December 1991, Koshinaka and Kuniaki Kobayashi were involved in a violent feud with karatekas Akitoshi Saito and Masashi Aoyagi. After their feud ended in the summer of 1992, the four eventually formed a stable that would eventually become Heisei Ishingun. Heisei Ishingun would also self-promote their own shows. They were also wrestle in WAR, which they feuded with several stars including Genichiro Tenryu, Ashura Hara, Takashi Ishikawa, Hiromichi Fuyuki, and Koki Kitahara, among others. In January 1995, Koshinaka teamed up with The Mad Dogs (Tatsutoshi Goto and Michiyoshi Ohara) to defeat Fuyuki, Jado, and Gedo to win the WAR World Six-Man Tag Team Championship, before losing the titles to Tenryu, Kitahara, and Animal Hamaguchi months later in June 1995. In July 1998, he won his second IWGP Tag Team title, this time with Tenryu, defeating Masahiro Chono and Hiroyoshi Tenzan. He and Tenryu would on to the titles until January 1999, when they lost the belts back to Tenzan and his new partner, Satoshi Kojima.

After Heisei Ishingun disbanded, Koshinaka rebounded and regained the IWGP Tag Team titles in March 1999, this time with Kensuke Sasaki. He and Sasaki held on to the belts until June 1999, when they lost the belts to The Mad Dogs. In the summer of 2000, AJPW and NJPW were working together after the Pro Wrestling Noah exodus nearly killed AJPW. This led Koshinaka to return to his home promotion after fifteen years. He took part in a tournament for the Triple Crown Heavyweight Championship that was vacated by Kenta Kobashi; he defeated Johnny Smith in the first round, but lost to Toshiaki Kawada in the semi-finals. In January 2003, Koshinaka's contract was not renewed by NJPW officials.

=== Freelance (2003–present) ===
Since January 2003, Koshinaka has been a freelancer, wrestling for various promotions through Japan, both major and independent. As a freelancer, he has won three championships: the NWA Intercontinental Tag Team Championship with Takao Omori in 2004 for Pro Wrestling Zero1, the interim IWGP Tag Team Championship with Togi Makabe in 2006 for New Japan Pro-Wrestling, and the KO-D Tag Team Championship with Danshoku Dino in 2010 for Dramatic Dream Team. On January 4, 2016, Koshinaka made a surprise return to NJPW by taking part in the New Japan Rumble on the Wrestle Kingdom 10 pre-show. He was the second to last man eliminated from the match by the eventual winner, Jado.

In 2008, Koshinaka made his debut in Hustle, defeating Genichiro Tenryu and breaking his winning streak. Koshinaka would start teaming up with Tenryu in order to help him to recover his motivation, and they joined the babyface faction Hustle Army shortly after. Koshinaka also formed a tag team with KG, acting as her mentor.

== Championships and accomplishments ==
- All Japan Pro Wrestling

- Lou Thesz Cup League (1983)

- Dramatic Dream Team

- KO-D Tag Team Championship (1 times) - with Danshoku Dino

- New Japan Pro-Wrestling

- IWGP Junior Heavyweight Championship (3 times)
- IWGP Tag Team Championship (3 times) - with Keiji Mutoh (1), Genichiro Tenryu (1) and Kensuke Sasaki (1)
- Interim IWGP Tag Team Championship (1 time) - with Togi Makabe
- Top of the Super Juniors: 1988
- One Night Tag Team Tournament (1996)- with Tatsumi Fujinami
- NJPW New Year Tag Team Tournament (1990) - with Masahiro Chono
- IWGP Junior Heavyweight Title League (1986)

- Pro Wrestling Illustrated

- PWI ranked him #156 of the 500 best singles wrestlers of the "PWI Years" in 2003

- Pro Wrestling ZERO1-MAX

- NWA Intercontinental Tag Team Championship (1 time) - with Takao Omori

- Tokyo Sports

- Best Tag Team Award (1986) - with Nobuhiko Takada
- Best Tag Team Award (1992) - with Akitoshi Saito, Kengo Kimura and Masashi Aoyagi
- Effort Award (1982)

- Wrestle Association "R"

- WAR World Six-Man Tag Team Championship (1 time) - with Tatsutoshi Goto and Michiyoshi Ohara

=== Luchas de Apuestas record ===
Winner (wager)	Loser (wager)	Location	Event	Date	Notes
El Satánico (hair)	Samurai Shiro (hair)	Mexico City, Mexico	Live event	July 13, 1984	
