= Tatsutoshi Goto =

Japanese professional wrestler

Personal information
- Born: May 25, 1956 (age 70) Tokoname, Aichi, Japan

Professional wrestling career
- Ring name(s): Mr. T Tatsutoshi Goto; T2000 Machine; T2000 Machine #1
- Billed height: 1.79 m (5 ft 10 in)
- Billed weight: 95 kg (209 lb)
- Debut: December 2, 1982
- Retired: 2011

Tatsutoshi Goto (後藤 達俊, Gotō Tatsutoshi; born May 25, 1956) is a Japanese professional wrestler. He competed primarily in WAR and New Japan Pro-Wrestling (NJPW), and briefly used the name "T2000 Machine". He also briefly competed in World Championship Wrestling (WCW) as part of the nWo Japan.

== Professional wrestling career ==
=== New Japan Pro-Wrestling (1982–2006) ===
Goto was an avid weightlifter during his university days, and achieved good results in competitions. After graduation, he studied karate, and in August 1982 joined New Japan Pro-Wrestling’s dojo. He debuted against Kazuo Yamazaki in December of that year, and performed young lion duties until 1986, when he first participated in the Young Lion Cup, making it to the finals, where he lost to Keiichi Yamada. After the cup, he carried out an overseas learning excursion to the USA. After returning, he became a prominent "heel" in New Japan. He participated in the first Best of the Super Juniors tournament where he finished in 10th place with 9 points. In 1990, he became a member the "Blond Outlaws" with Hiro Saito and Norio Honaga, where he largely remained in the midcard only getting one title shot when he and Super Strong Machine challenged Kensuke Sasaki and Hiroshi Hase for the IWGP Tag Team Championship on December 11, 1990 in a losing effort. On June 12, 1990, he was given the nickname "Mr. BD" after giving a backdrop to Hiroshi Hase which nearly killed him. After the Blonde Outlaws broke up, Goto later joined Shiro Koshinaka's, Heisei Ishingun in 1993 where he would form a longtime tag team with Michiyoshi Ohara, known as the Mad Dogs.

While in Ishigun, Goto would win his first championship when he teamed with Koshinaka and Ohara to defeat Hiromichi Fuyuki, Gedo and Jado on January 8, 1995, to win the WAR World Six-Man Tag Team Championship. After over 3 months as champions, Ishigun lost the titles on April 30, 1995 to Genichiro Tenryu, Animal Hamaguchi, and Koki Kitahara. Later in the year, Goto took part in the 1995 Super Grade Tag League teaming with Koshinaka where they finished 4th place with 6 points. For the next 2 years, Goto continued to represent Ishingun in feuds with New Japan Pro-Wrestling and also briefly teamed with nWo Japan for several tours in 1997.

After the collapse of Heisei Ishingun in 1999, Goto continued to team with Ohara and on June 27, 1999, they won the IWGP Tag Team Championship from Kensuke Sasaki and former leader of Heisei Ishingun Shiro Koshinaka. After holding the titles for 2 months, the Mad Dogs lost the titles to Yuji Nagata and Manabu Nakanishi on August 28, 1999 at Jingu Climax. In 2000 he became a Masahiro Chono loyalist, joining "Team 2000". After joining Team 2000, Goto would briefly continue to team with Ohara but the team quietly broke up towards the end of 2000. Afterwards, Goto would use several masked gimmicks. He first became "Mr. T" at the Do Judge!! event teaming with Chono to defeat Shiro Koshinaka and Masanobu Fuchi. After Do Judge!!, Goto then became "T2000" Machine and feuded with Super Strong Machine.

In 2001, he reunited with old Blonde Outlaws partner Hiro Saito, but the team was never pushed and remained in the midcard. The Blonde Outlaws’ only highlight was winning the 2003 Teisen Hall Six Man Tag Team Tournament with Shinsuke Nakamura. In 2003, Goto reunited with Michiyoshi Ohara in a new stable known as "The Crazy Dogs" with Hiro Saito and Enson Inoue. From 2003 to 2004, The Crazy Dogs were in a feud with the Makai Club, which ended after Ohara and Inoue left New Japan.

=== Freelance (2006–2011) ===
In January, 2006, Goto left New Japan to become a freelancer, although would make New Japan appearances after leaving. After becoming a freelancer, Goto worked in a variety of promotions including DRADITION, Pro Wrestling Zero1, Kensuke Office, Tenryu Project, DDT, & Hustle. On June 9, 2010, Goto won his first championship in 10 years when he teamed with Yoshihiro Takayama and Daisuke Sekimoto to win the Tenryu Project Six-Man Tag Team Championships.

== Championships and accomplishments ==
- New Japan Pro-Wrestling

- IWGP Tag Team Championship (1 time) - with Michiyoshi Ohara
- Teisen Hall Cup Six Man Tag Team Tournament (2003) – with Hiro Saito and Shinsuke Nakamura

- Tenryu Project

- Tenryu Project Six-Man Tag Team Championship (1 time) - with Daisuke Sekimoto and Yoshihiro Takayama

- Wrestle Association "R"

- WAR Six Man Tag Team Championship (1 time)- with Shiro Koshinaka & Michiyoshi Ohara
