= IWGP Tag Team Championship =

Professional wrestling tag team championship

- The IWGP Tag Team Championship belts

Details
- Promotion: New Japan Pro-Wrestling (NJPW)
- Date established: December 12, 1985
- Current champions: Knock Out Brothers (Yuto-Ice and Oskar)
- Date won: October 6, 2026

Other names
- IWGP Tag Team Championship (1985–present); IWGP World Tag Team Championship (name used by ROH and TNA); IWGP Heavyweight Tag Team Championship
Statistics
- First champions: Kengo Kimura & Tatsumi Fujinami
- Most reigns: As Tag Team ((7 reigns)): Guerrillas of Destiny (Tama Tonga & Tanga Loa); As individual(12 reigns): Hiroyoshi Tenzan
- Longest reign: Bad Intentions (Giant Bernard & Karl Anderson) (564 days)
- Shortest reign: Keiji Muto and Shiro Koshinaka (6 days)
- Oldest champion: Tomohiro Ishii (49 years, 6 months and 5 days)
- Youngest champion: Callum Newman (22 years, 7 months and 26 days)

The IWGP Tag Team Championship (IWGPタッグ王座, IWGP taggu ōza) is a professional wrestling world tag team championship owned by the New Japan Pro-Wrestling (NJPW) promotion. "IWGP" is the acronym of the NJPW's governing body, the International Wrestling Grand Prix (インターナショナル・レスリング・グラン・プリ, intānashonaru resuringu guran puri). The title was introduced on December 12, 1985 at an NJPW live event. The IWGP Tag Team Championship is one of two weight-specific tag team titles contested for in NJPW; the IWGP Junior Heavyweight Tag Team Championship is also sanctioned by NJPW. According to NJPW's official website, the IWGP Tag Team Championship is considered the "IWGP Heavyweight [Tag] Class", while the Junior Heavyweight Tag Team Championship is listed as the "IWGP Jr. Tag Class". The current champions are Knock Out Brothers (Yuto-Ice and Oskar), who are in their second reign as a team and individually. They won the title by defeating United Empire (Henare and Great-O-Khan) on Night 1 of Road to King of Pro-Wrestling on October 6, 2026.

== History ==
Before the IWGP championship system was created, New Japan Pro-Wrestling featured the NWA North American Tag Team Championship, a title originally based in Los Angeles, and the WWF International Tag Team Championship, a title licensed from the World Wrestling Federation (WWF), which was abandoned when the WWF working relationship ended.

The inaugural champions were Kengo Kimura & Tatsumi Fujinami, who defeated Antonio Inoki & Seiji Sakaguchi in the final of a tournament to win the championship on December 12, 1985, at an NJPW live event. In addition to NJPW, the IWGP Tag Team Championship was also contested in the United States–based promotions World Championship Wrestling (WCW) (now defunct) in the early 1990s, and Total Nonstop Action Wrestling (TNA) in 2009, and in the Mexican lucha libre promotion Consejo Mundial de Lucha Libre in 2005.

On October 30, 2005, in Kobe, Japan, Hiroyoshi Tenzan and Masahiro Chono defeated Hiroshi Tanahashi and Shinsuke Nakamura to begin their fifth overall reign as a team. On July 2, 2006, an interim tag team title was created when Tenzan & Chono showed signs of inactivity. Shiro Koshinaka and Togi Makabe defeated the teams of Yuji Nagata and Naofumi Yamamoto and Giant Bernard and Travis Tomko in a Three-Way Match to become the first interim champions. NJPW president Simon Kelly Inoki stripped Tenzan and Chono of the IWGP Tag Team Championship on September 20, 2006, after Tenzan and Chono ceased teaming. Manabu Nakanishi and Takao Omori, who defeated Koshinaka and Makabe on July 17, 2006, to become the interim champions, were recognized as the IWGP Tag Team Champions on September 28, 2006, by NJPW.

In 2009, The British Invasion defeated Team 3D on July 21, 2009, at a TNA television taping for the championship. Afterwards, NJPW released a statement announcing that they did not sanction the defense nor the title change, and as such did not recognize the reign. They continued to recognize Team 3D as the current champions and proclaimed that the next title defense would be by Team 3D and would be sanctioned by NJPW. On August 10, 2009, NJPW issued another press release stating that they were now recognizing The British Invasion of Brutus Magnus and Doug Williams as the current IWGP Tag Team Champions, making the reign official.

== Reigns ==
Overall, there have been 112 reigns shared among 97 different wrestlers, who made up 72 different teams. Hiroyoshi Tenzan holds the record for most reigns by an individual wrestler at 12, with his combined reigns adding up to 1,988 days. At seven reigns, the Guerrillas of Destiny (Tama Tonga & Tanga Loa) hold the record for most by a team. Tenzan & Masahiro Chono's combined five reign lengths add up to 1,010 days (the most of any team). At 564 days, Bad Intentions' (Giant Bernard & Karl Anderson) only reign is the longest in the title's history and has the most defenses at 10. Keiji Muto & Shiro Koshinaka's only reign is the shortest at six days. There are 20 reigns shared between 18 teams that are tied for the fewest successful defenses, with zero.

Knock Out Brothers (Yuto-Ice and Oskar) are the current champions in their second reign. They won the title by defeating United Empire (Henare and Great-O-Khan) on Night 1 of Road to King of Pro-Wrestling in Tokyo, Japan, on October 6, 2026.
