= Wrestling Dontaku 1994 =

1994 New Japan Pro-Wrestling event

- Promotion(s): New Japan Pro-Wrestling; World Championship Wrestling
- Date: May 1, 1994
- City: Fukuoka, Japan
- Venue: Fukuoka Dome
- Attendance: 53,500

Wrestling Dontaku chronology
← Previous; 1993	Next → 1995

NJPW events chronology
← Previous; Battlefield	Next → Battle 7

Wrestling Dontaku 1994 was the second Wrestling Dontaku professional wrestling television special event co-produced by New Japan Pro-Wrestling (NJPW) and World Championship Wrestling (WCW). The event was held on May 1, 1994, in Fukuoka, Fukuoka, at the Fukuoka Dome. The event featured thirteen matches; three of which were contested for championships.

Much like the previous year, the event featured wrestlers from World Championship Wrestling (WCW), with Rick Rude defeating Sting for the WCW International World Heavyweight Championship. This would turn out to be Rude's final wrestling match as he suffered a back injury during the match which ended his career. As a result, the decision was later reversed due to Rude cheating to win the match. The semi-main event saw Shinya Hashimoto defeat Tatsumi Fujinami to win the IWGP Heavyweight Championship for the second time. In the main event, Antonio Inoki defeated The Great Muta.

== Event ==
=== Preliminary matches ===
The opening match of the event took place between Satoshi Kojima and Yuji Nagata. In the end, Kojima won the match by making Nagata submit to a leg and neck lock.

Next, El Samurai and Tokimitsu Ishizawa took on the team of Shinjiro Otani and Tatsuhito Takaiwa in a tag team match. In the end, Samurai nailed a Samurai Bomb on Takaiwa for the win.

Next, the Heisei Ishingun members Akitoshi Saito, Michiyoshi Ohara and Tatsutoshi Goto took on the team of Akira Nogami, Osamu Kido and Takayuki Iizuka in a six-man tag team match. In the climax, Kido pinned Ohara with a Kido Clutch for the win.

The match was followed by another six-man tag team match featuring Heisei Ishingun members The Great Kabuki, Kengo Kimura and Kuniaki Kobayashi against the team of Hiro Saito, Norio Honaga and Shinichi Nakano. The match climaxed when Kimura hit a powerbomb on Honaga.

Next, Tadao Yasuda took on El Gigante. In the end, Gigante applied a clawhold on Yasuda and got him to the mat forcing Yasuda to submit to the hold.

Next, Jushin Thunder Liger took on Satoru Sayama in an exhibition match. The match ended in a ten-minute time limit draw.

Later, Shiro Koshinaka took on Yoshiaki Yatsu. Near the climax, Koshinaka executed a powerbomb to Yatsu following a hip attack but got a near-fall and then Koshinaka nailed a missile dropkick and a second powerbomb for the win.

This was followed by the first title match of the event as the Hell Raisers defended the IWGP Tag Team Championship against the Steiner Brothers. Hell Raisers delivered a Double Impact to Scott Steiner for the win to retain the titles.

In the following match, Sting defended the WCW International World Heavyweight Championship against Rick Rude. During the match, Sting delivered a springboard plancha to Rude which injured Rude's back and as a result, Rude suffered a career-ending back injury. However, Rude managed to continue the match. In the climax, Sting attempted to dive onto Rude but Rude put his valet in front of him and then Rude hit Sting with the title belt. This allowed Rude to gain momentum as he hit a piledriver in the ring for a near-fall and then followed with a diving knee drop to Sting to win the title. Because of Rude's back injury and resulting forced retirement, WCW subsequently announced (in storyline) that Rude's title win had been voided due to his use of the title belt as a weapon during the match, allowing Sting to keep the championship.

Next, Yoshiaki Fujiwara took on Masahiro Chono. In the end, Chono made Fujiwara submit to the STF for the submission victory.

Later, Riki Choshu took on Hiroshi Hase. Near the end of the match, Hase applied a sleeper hold on Choshu which Choshu countered after hitting three backdrop suplexes and then Hase tried to dive off the top rope but Choshu nailed a Riki Lariat and followed with another lariat and then applied a Sasori-gatame to make him submit to the hold.

In the penultimate match, Tatsumi Fujinami defended the IWGP Heavyweight Championship against Shinya Hashimoto. In the climax, Hashimoto nailed a jumping DDT on Fujinami to win the title.

=== Main event match ===
The main event match took place between Antonio Inoki and The Great Muta and was the first match in the Inoki Final Countdown Series, a series of Inoki's final matches, leading up to his retirement from professional wrestling. Near the end of the match, Muta tried to hit a handspring back elbow to Inoki but Inoki countered and applied a sleeper hold and then pinned Muta in the sleeper hold for the win.

== Reception ==
According to Kevin Wilson of Puroresu Central, Wrestling Dontaku was "a decent show", with "The title match was a little short, but there were a handful of matches on here that were very good. Unfortunately none were "must see" matches and I fear that just from looking at the match line-up people will be disappointed with the result. Course watching Rude's last match was special, it's a shame his career had to end so early since I am sure he had at least a few more good years left in him. Overall I would recommend this, but only for completists or hardcore New Japan fans, as the average fan will probably think the show fell short of expectations."

== Results ==
No.	Results	Stipulations	Times
1	Satoshi Kojima defeated Yuji Nagata via submission	Singles match	11:12
2	El Samurai and Tokimitsu Ishizawa defeated Shinjiro Otani and Tatsuhito Takaiwa	Tag team match	13:48
3	Akira Nogami, Osamu Kido and Takayuki Iizuka defeated Heisei Ishingun (Akitoshi Saito, Michiyoshi Ohara and Tatsutoshi Goto)	Six-man tag team match	14:06
4	Heisei Ishingun (Great Kabuki, Kengo Kimura and Kuniaki Kobayashi) defeated Hiro Saito, Norio Honaga and Shinichi Nakano	Six-man tag team match	08:39
5	El Gigante defeated Tadao Yasuda via submission	Singles match	03:51
6	Jushin Thunder Liger vs. Satoru Sayama ended in a time limit draw	Singles match	10:00
7	Shiro Koshinaka defeated Yoshiaki Yatsu	Singles match	12:16
8	The Hell Raisers (Hawk Warrior and Power Warrior) (c) defeated The Steiner Brothers (Rick Steiner and Scott Steiner)	Tag team match for the IWGP Tag Team Championship	15:27
9	Rick Rude defeated Sting (c)	Singles match for the WCW International World Heavyweight Championship	22:48
10	Masahiro Chono defeated Yoshiaki Fujiwara via submission	Singles match	08:08
11	Riki Choshu defeated Hiroshi Hase via submission	Singles match	10:56
12	Shinya Hashimoto defeated Tatsumi Fujinami (c)	Singles match for the IWGP Heavyweight Championship	06:04
13	Antonio Inoki defeated The Great Muta	Singles match	20:12
(c) / – the champion(s) heading into the match
