= Dominion 6.18 =

- Promotional poster for the event, featuring various NJPW wrestlers
- Promotion: New Japan Pro-Wrestling
- Date: June 18, 2011
- City: Osaka, Japan
- Venue: Osaka Prefectural Gymnasium
- Attendance: 6,200

Pay-per-view chronology
← Previous; Wrestling Dontaku	Next → New Japan Soul

Dominion chronology
← Previous; 6.19	Next → 6.16

New Japan Pro-Wrestling events chronology
← Previous; Wrestling Dontaku	Next → Destruction '11

Dominion 6.18 was a professional wrestling pay-per-view (PPV) event promoted by New Japan Pro-Wrestling (NJPW). The event took place on June 18, 2011, in Osaka, Osaka, at the Osaka Prefectural Gymnasium. The event featured ten matches, five of which were contested for championships. It was the third event under the Dominion name.

== Storylines ==
Dominion 6.18 featured ten professional wrestling matches that involved different wrestlers from pre-existing scripted feuds and storylines. Wrestlers portrayed villains, heroes, or less distinguishable characters in the scripted events that built tension and culminated in a wrestling match or series of matches.

== Event ==
The event featured a tag team match, where NJPW's IWGP Tag Team Champions, Bad Intentions (Giant Bernard and Karl Anderson), defeated Pro Wrestling Noah's GHC Tag Team Champions, Takuma Sano and Yoshihiro Takayama, to become double champions. The event also featured the surprise debut of former WWE wrestler Brian Kendrick, who replaced Killer Rabbit as Gedo and Jado's partner. During the event, Consejo Mundial de Lucha Libre (CMLL) wrestler Máscara Dorada regained the CMLL World Middleweight Championship from Ryusuke Taguchi to whom he had lost it at Fantastica Mania 2011 the previous January, while DDT Pro-Wrestling wrestler and winner of the 2011 Best of the Super Juniors Kota Ibushi captured the IWGP Junior Heavyweight Championship from Prince Devitt. In the main event, Hiroshi Tanahashi successfully defended the IWGP Heavyweight Championship against Hirooki Goto.

== Aftermath ==
A post-main event confrontation between Tanahashi and new double tag team champion Giant Bernard led to two title matches; Tanahashi and Goto challenging Bad Intentions for the IWGP Tag Team Championship and Bernard challenging Tanahashi for the IWGP Heavyweight Championship. Both champions ended up retaining their titles.

== Results ==
No.	Results	Stipulations	Times
1	Koji Kanemoto defeated Hiromu Takahashi by submission	Singles match	03:04
2	Chaos (Brian Kendrick, Gedo and Jado) defeated Jyushin Thunder Liger, Kushida and Tiger Mask	Six-man tag team match	08:33
3	Máscara Dorada defeated Ryusuke Taguchi (c)	Singles match for the CMLL World Welterweight Championship	08:26
4	Hiroyoshi Tenzan and Seigigun (Wataru Inoue and Yuji Nagata) defeated Chaos (Masato Tanaka, Takashi Iizuka and Tomohiro Ishii)	Six-man tag team match	09:12
5	Yujiro Takahashi defeated Tetsuya Naito	Singles match	11:12
6	Kota Ibushi defeated Prince Devitt (c)	Singles match for the IWGP Junior Heavyweight Championship	13:49
7	Suzuki-gun (Lance Archer and Minoru Suzuki) defeated Satoshi Kojima and Togi Makabe	Tag team match	12:39
8	MVP (c) defeated Toru Yano	Singles match for the IWGP Intercontinental Championship	10:50
9	Bad Intentions (Giant Bernard and Karl Anderson) (IWGP) defeated Takuma Sano and Yoshihiro Takayama (GHC)	Tag team match for the GHC Tag Team Championship and the IWGP Tag Team Championship	12:03
10	Hiroshi Tanahashi (c) defeated Hirooki Goto	Singles match for the IWGP Heavyweight Championship	25:28
(c) / – the champion(s) heading into the match
