= Wrestling Dontaku 1995 =

1995 New Japan Pro-Wrestling event

- Promotion: New Japan Pro-Wrestling
- Date: May 3, 1995
- City: Fukuoka, Japan
- Venue: Fukuoka Dome
- Attendance: 52,000

Event chronology
← Previous; Pyongyang International Sports and Culture Festival for Peace	Next → Wrestling World 1996

Wrestling Dontaku chronology
← Previous; 1994	Next → 2000

Wrestling Dontaku (1995) was the third Wrestling Dontaku professional wrestling television special event produced by New Japan Pro-Wrestling (NJPW), held on May 3, 1995, in Fukuoka, Fukuoka, at the Fukuoka Dome.

The event featured eleven matches, two of which were contested for championships. For the third year in a row, wrestlers from World Championship Wrestling (WCW) took part in the event.

In the main event, Keiji Mutoh defeated Shinya Hashimoto to capture the IWGP Heavyweight Championship, ending Hashimoto's year-long reign which had started at the previous year's Wrestling Dontaku. In other prominent matches, Antonio Inoki and Kōji Kitao defeated Genichiro Tenryu and Riki Choshu, Ric Flair defeated Hiroshi Hase, Shiro Koshinaka and Terry Funk defeated Hiromichi Fuyuki and Masahiro Chono, The Steiner Brothers (Rick Steiner and Scott Steiner) defeated Hawk Warrior and Scott Norton and Sabu defeated Koji Kanemoto to capture the IWGP Junior Heavyweight Championship.

== Event ==
=== Preliminary matches ===
Wrestling Dontaku opened with a match between Manabu Nakanishi and Yuji Nagata. Nagata countered a clothesline from Nakanishi and hit a release German suplex and applied a cross armbreaker on Nakanishi to make him submit for the win.

Next, El Samurai and Takayuki Iizuka took on Akira Nogami and Norio Honaga. Iizuka delivered a Blizzard Suplex to Nogami for the win.

Next, Wild Pegasus took on Flying Scorpio. Pegasus knocked out Scorpio when Scorpio tried to deliver a hurricanrana to Pegasus from the top rope, knocking both of them down on the mat. Pegasus then delivered a kneeling reverse piledriver and a diving headbutt to Scorpio for the win.

Next, Koji Kanemoto defended the IWGP Junior Heavyweight Championship against Sabu. Kanemoto began arguing with the referee after getting a near-fall on Sabu after hitting a moonsault. Sabu took advantage of the distraction by hitting Kanemoto with a chair and he delivered an Arabian Press to Kanemoto to win the Junior Heavyweight Championship. Kanemoto confronted Sabu after the match for cheating to win and Sabu threw down the belt saying he did not need it because he was a heavyweight and not a junior heavyweight.

Next, Junji Hirata took on Hiro Saito. After a series of near-falls, Hirata finally managed to knock Saito out with a sitout powerbomb for the win.

Next, The Steiner Brothers (Rick Steiner and Scott Steiner) took on Hawk Warrior and Scott Norton. Steiners performed a Steinerizer on Hawk for the win.

Next, Shiro Koshinaka and Terry Funk took on Hiromichi Fuyuki and Masahiro Chono. Fuyuki's Fuyuki-Gun stablemate Gedo interfered in the match to assist Fuyuki and Chono. Chono held Koshinaka to let Gedo hit a missile dropkick to Koshinaka but Koshinaka moved out and Gedo accidentally hit Chono with the missile dropkick. It allowed Koshinaka to deliver a hip attack to Chono for the win.

Next, Ric Flair took on Hiroshi Hase. Flair avoided a diving knee drop by Hase and applied a figure four leglock on Hase to make him submit for the win.

Next, Antonio Inoki and Koji Kitao took on Genichiro Tenryu and Riki Choshu. Inoki avoided a Riki Lariat by Choshu while Kitao distracted Tenryu. Inoki then applied a sleeper hold on Choshu to make him pass out to the hold and pinned him for the win.

It was followed by the penultimate match of the event between Kensuke Sasaki and Hiroyoshi Tenzan. Sasaki delivered a lariat to Tenzan following a brainbuster for the win.

=== Main event match ===
Shinya Hashimoto defended the IWGP Heavyweight Championship against Keiji Mutoh in the main event. Mutoh avoided a brainbuster by Hashimoto and hit a full nelson suplex to Hashimoto followed by a moonsault from the top rope and a second moonsault from the second turnbuckle to pin him and win the Heavyweight Championship.

== Reception ==
Wrestling Dontaku was a major success for NJPW, drawing approximately 52,000 spectators at the Fukuoka Dome. Kevin Wilson of Puroresu Central considered it "a great show" with "a wide spectrum of entertaining matches". He gave the highest rating to the tag team match between Steiner Brothers and the team of Hawk Warrior and Scott Norton, rating it 8.5 and praised it as his most favorite match of the night due to "a bunch of big brutes knocking the stuffing out of each other". He heavily praised it for being "Hard hitting, brutal, and awesome" and "entertaining from bell to bell". He felt that the event "demonstrated how strong New Japan was during the mid-90s". He said that the night "ended hot and the crowd was extremely into most of the matches" and "Even the bad matches were still worth watching since the crowd was really into them."

Mike Campbell of 411Mania rated the event 5.0, stating Wrestling Dontaku as "something Confucius would have booked". He felt that "Every match with something good to offer, also had something bad tacked on there to deal with". He believed that the IWGP Heavyweight Championship match between Keiji Muto and Shinya Hashimoto was "one-upped by their G1 (Climax) finals match later in the year".

== Aftermath ==
After losing the IWGP Junior Heavyweight Championship to Sabu, Koji Kanemoto defeated Gran Hamada to capture the UWA World Welterweight Championship on June 12. Two days later, on June 14, Kanemoto faced Sabu in a title versus title rematch at Super Power Group Declaration VI, with Sabu and Kanemoto's titles on the line. Kanemoto defeated Sabu for control over both titles.

The Ookami Gundan alliance of Hiro Saito, Hiroyoshi Tenzan and Masahiro Chono rebounded from their losses at Wrestling Dontaku as they defeated Junji Hirata and Shinya Hashimoto to win the vacant IWGP Tag Team Championship on June 12.

Manabu Nakanishi wrestled a few matches for NJPW after Wrestling Dontaku until July when he became the first NJPW wrestler to go on a learning excursion to NJPW's working partner WCW in the United States, competing as Kurasawa for a year. He returned to NJPW, the following year, in September, competing in the nine-match Kurasawa Trial Series during the G1 Climax Special tour, before reverting to competing under his real name.

== Results ==
No.	Results	Stipulations	Times
1	Yuji Nagata defeated Manabu Nakanishi	Singles match	13:29
2	El Samurai and Takayuki Iizuka defeated Akira Nogami and Norio Honaga	Tag team match	13:45
3	Wild Pegasus defeated Flying Scorpio	Singles match	12:00
4	Sabu defeated Koji Kanemoto (c)	Singles match for the IWGP Junior Heavyweight Championship	16:39
5	Junji Hirata defeated Hiro Saito	Singles match	06:04
6	The Steiner Brothers (Rick Steiner and Scott Steiner) defeated Hawk Warrior and Scott Norton	Tag team match	18:52
7	Shiro Koshinaka and Terry Funk defeated Hiromichi Fuyuki and Masahiro Chono	Tag team match	13:40
8	Ric Flair defeated Hiroshi Hase	Singles match	22:52
9	Antonio Inoki and Kōji Kitao defeated Genichiro Tenryu and Riki Choshu	Tag team match	10:57
10	Kensuke Sasaki defeated Hiroyoshi Tenzan	Singles match	11:20
11	Keiji Mutoh defeated Shinya Hashimoto (c)	Singles match for the IWGP Heavyweight Championship	21:13
(c) / – the champion(s) heading into the match
