= Dominion 6.16 =

- Promotional poster for the event, featuring various NJPW wrestler
- Promotion: New Japan Pro-Wrestling
- Date: June 16, 2012
- City: Osaka, Japan
- Venue: Bodymaker Colosseum
- Attendance: 6,850

Pay-per-view chronology
← Previous; Wrestling Dontaku	Next → G1 Climax 22

Dominion chronology
← Previous; 6.18	Next → 6.22

New Japan Pro-Wrestling events chronology
← Previous; Wrestling Dontaku 2012	Next → Destruction

Dominion 6.16 was a professional wrestling pay-per-view (PPV) event promoted by New Japan Pro-Wrestling (NJPW). The event took place on June 16, 2012, in Osaka, Osaka, at the newly renamed Bodymaker Colosseum. The event featured ten matches, four of which were contested for championships. It was the fourth event under the Dominion name.

== Storylines ==
Dominion 6.16 featured ten professional wrestling matches that involved different wrestlers from pre-existing scripted feuds and storylines. Wrestlers portrayed villains, heroes, or less distinguishable characters in the scripted events that built tension and culminated in a wrestling match or series of matches.

== Event ==
The opening match saw participation from the DDT Pro-Wrestling trio of Daisuke Sasaki, Kenny Omega and Kota Ibushi facing NJPW's Bushi, Kushida and Prince Devitt in a six-man tag team match. The third match was a decision match to determine the new IWGP Junior Heavyweight Tag Team Championship. Jyushin Thunder Liger and Tiger Mask defeated Taichi and Taka Michinoku to win the vacant title, when Liger revived his old Kishin Liger persona, after being unmasked by Taichi. The event saw Low Ki successfully defend the IWGP Junior Heavyweight Championship against 2012 Best of the Super Juniors winner Ryusuke Taguchi, while two attempts were unable to determine the winner between IWGP Tag Team Champions, Takashi Iizuka and Toru Yano, and challengers, Tencozy (Hiroyoshi Tenzan and Satoshi Kojima). As a result, four days later, the IWGP Tag Team Championship was declared vacant. In the main event, Hiroshi Tanahashi recaptured the IWGP Heavyweight Championship from Kazuchika Okada. With his sixth title win, Tanahashi tied the record for most reigns as the IWGP Heavyweight Champion.

== Reception ==
Tokyo Sports later named the main event the 2012 Match of the Year.

== Results ==
No.	Results	Stipulations	Times
1	Daisuke Sasaki and Golden☆Lovers (Kenny Omega and Kota Ibushi) defeated Bushi, Kushida and Prince Devitt	Six-man tag team match	10:48
2	Chaos (Rocky Romero, Tomohiro Ishii and Yoshi-Hashi) defeated Seigigun (Captain New Japan, Wataru Inoue and Yuji Nagata)	Six-man tag team match	09:26
3	Jyushin Thunder Liger and Tiger Mask defeated Suzuki-gun (Taichi and Taka Michinoku)	Tag team match for the vacant IWGP Junior Heavyweight Tag Team Championship	09:20
4	Black Dynamite (MVP and Shelton Benjamin) defeated Karl Anderson and Tama Tonga	Tag team match	10:19
5	Low Ki (c) defeated Ryusuke Taguchi	Singles match for the IWGP Junior Heavyweight Championship	12:32
6	Chaos (Takashi Iizuka and Toru Yano) (c) vs. Tencozy (Hiroyoshi Tenzan and Satoshi Kojima) ended in a double countout	Tag team match for the IWGP Tag Team Championship	02:41
7	Chaos (Takashi Iizuka and Toru Yano) (c) vs. Tencozy (Hiroyoshi Tenzan and Satoshi Kojima) ended in a no contest	Tag team match for the IWGP Tag Team Championship	12:26
8	Chaos (Masato Tanaka and Shinsuke Nakamura) defeated Hirooki Goto and Tetsuya Naito	Tag team match	13:28
9	Togi Makabe defeated Minoru Suzuki	Singles match	16:21
10	Hiroshi Tanahashi defeated Kazuchika Okada (c) (with Gedo)	Singles match for the IWGP Heavyweight Championship	28:06
(c) / – the champion(s) heading into the match
