= Destruction '09 =

2009 New Japan Pro-Wrestling pay-per-view event

- Promotion: New Japan Pro-Wrestling
- Date: November 8, 2009
- City: Tokyo, Japan
- Venue: Ryōgoku Kokugikan
- Attendance: 7,500

Pay-per-view chronology
← Previous; Chōno Masahiro 25-shūnen Tokubetsu Kōgyō Aristrist in Ryōgoku Kokugikan	Next → Wrestle Kingdom IV in Tokyo Dome

Destruction chronology
← Previous '08	Next → '10

New Japan Pro-Wrestling events chronology
← Previous; Dominion 6.20	Next → Wrestle Kingdom IV

Destruction '09 was a professional wrestling pay-per-view (PPV) event promoted by New Japan Pro-Wrestling (NJPW). The event took place on November 8, 2009, in Tokyo, at Ryōgoku Kokugikan. The event featured nine matches, three of which were contested for championships.

The event featured outside participation from Consejo Mundial de Lucha Libre (CMLL) representative Místico and Hustle representative Tajiri. It was the third event under the Destruction name.

== Production ==
=== Storylines ===
Destruction '09 featured nine professional wrestling matches that involved different wrestlers from pre-existing scripted feuds and storylines. Wrestlers portrayed villains, heroes, or less distinguishable characters in the scripted events that built tension and culminated in a wrestling match or series of matches.

== Event ==
The event saw one title switch, when Místico lost the IWGP Junior Heavyweight Championship back to Tiger Mask, ending his three-month-long reign. The Total Nonstop Action Wrestling (TNA) tag team Team 3D (Brother Devon and Brother Ray) returned to NJPW at the event to make their first successful defense of the IWGP Tag Team Championship against the winners of the 2009 G1 Tag League, Bad Intentions (Giant Bernard and Karl Anderson), though the match ended in a double countout. In the main event Shinsuke Nakamura retained the IWGP Heavyweight Championship against Hiroshi Tanahashi.

== Results ==
No.	Results	Stipulations	Times
1	Gedo and Jado defeated Apollo 55 (Prince Devitt and Ryusuke Taguchi)	Tag team match	09:32
2	Tajiri defeated Kazuchika Okada	Singles match	09:03
3	Koji Kanemoto, Manabu Nakanishi and Takao Omori defeated Legend (Akira, Jyushin Thunder Liger and Masahiro Chono)	Six-man tag team match	09:44
4	Seigigun (Wataru Inoue and Yuji Nagata) defeated Chaos (Tomohiro Ishii and Toru Yano)	Tag team match	11:00
5	Tiger Mask defeated Místico (c)	Singles match for the IWGP Junior Heavyweight Championship	12:01
6	Team 3D (Brother Devon and Brother Ray) (c) vs. Bad Intentions (Giant Bernard and Karl Anderson) ended in a double countout	Tag team match for the IWGP Tag Team Championship	15:42
7	Masato Tanaka defeated Hirooki Goto	Singles match	14:28
8	Togi Makabe defeated Takashi Iizuka	Chain Deathmatch	16:55
9	Shinsuke Nakamura (c) defeated Hiroshi Tanahashi	Singles match for the IWGP Heavyweight Championship	22:47
(c) / – the champion(s) heading into the match
