= Battle 7 =

1995 New Japan Pro-Wrestling event

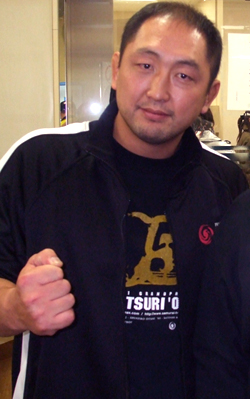
- Shinjiro Otani, who successfully defended the UWA World Welterweight Championship at the event.
- Promotion: New Japan Pro-Wrestling
- Date: January 4, 1995
- City: Tokyo, Japan
- Venue: Tokyo Dome
- Attendance: 52,500

Pay-per-view chronology
← Previous; Wrestling Dontaku 1994	Next → Collision in Korea

January 4 Tokyo Dome Show chronology
← Previous; Battlefield	Next → Wrestling World

Battle 7 was a professional wrestling television special event produced by New Japan Pro-Wrestling (NJPW) that took place on January 4, 1995 in the Tokyo Dome. Battle 7 was the fourth January 4 Tokyo Dome Show held by NJPW. The show drew 52,500 spectators and $4,800,000 in ticket sales.

Besides NJPW wrestlers, the show also featured Sting from World Championship Wrestling (WCW) and former WCW stars The Steiner Brothers (Rick Steiner and Scott Steiner), as well as freelance wrestlers Tiger Jeet Singh and Tiger Jeet Singh, Jr. The show featured a four-man "Final Countdown BVD" tournament, named after NJPW sponsor BVD.

The 1995 show marked the first time a non-NJPW or WCW title was defended, Shinjiro Otani defending the UWA World Welterweight Championship (originated in the Mexican Universal Wrestling Association) against El Samurai.

Before his death on November 23, 1994, American Machine was originally slated to challenge Norio Honaga for the IWGP Junior Heavyweight Championship. After Barr's untimely death, The Great Sasuke took his place in the match.

== Production ==
=== Storylines ===
Battle 7 featured professional wrestling matches that involved different wrestlers from pre-existing scripted feuds and storylines. Wrestlers portrayed villains, heroes, or less distinguishable characters in scripted events that built tension and culminated in a wrestling match or series of matches.

== Results ==
No.	Results	Stipulations	Times
1	Shinjiro Otani (c) defeated El Samurai	Singles match for the UWA World Welterweight Championship	15:17
2	Norio Honaga (c) defeated The Great Sasuke	Singles match for the IWGP Junior Heavyweight Championship	14:39
3	Akitoshi Saito, The Great Kabuki and Kuniaki Kobayashi defeated Akira Nogami, Osamu Kido and Takayuki Iizuka	Six-man tag team match	13:12
4	Koji Kanemoto defeated Yuji Nagata	Singles match	14:43
5	Hiroyoshi Tenzan defeated Manabu Nakanishi	Singles match	07:40
6	Tiger Jeet Singh and Tiger Jeet Singh, Jr. defeated Michiyoshi Ohara and Shiro Koshinaka	Tag team match	11:23
7	Sting defeated Tony Palmore	Singles match: semifinals of the "Final Countdown BVD" tournament	04:29
8	Antonio Inoki defeated Gerard Gordeau	Singles match: semifinals of the "Final Countdown BVD" tournament	06:37
9	Riki Choshu and Yoshiaki Yatsu defeated Kengo Kimura and Tatsutoshi Goto	Tag team match	12:32
10	Masahiro Chono and Sabu defeated Junji Hirata and Tatsumi Fujinami	Tag team match	11:18
11	Hawk defeated Scott Norton	Singles match	07:41
12	Antonio Inoki defeated Sting	Singles match: finals of the "Final Countdown BVD" tournament	10:26
13	Hiroshi Hase and Keiji Mutoh (c) defeated The Steiner Brothers (Rick Steiner and Scott Steiner)	Tag team match for the IWGP Tag Team Championship	25:12
14	Shinya Hashimoto (c) defeated Kensuke Sasaki	Singles match for the IWGP Heavyweight Championship	19:36
(c) / – the champion(s) heading into the match

=== Final Countdown BVD tournament bracket ===
Semifinals
Tony Palmore	Sub
Sting	04:29
Gerard Gordeau	Sub
Antonio Inoki	06:37

Finals
Sting	Sub
Antonio Inoki	10:26
