= No Remorse Corps =

Professional wrestling stable

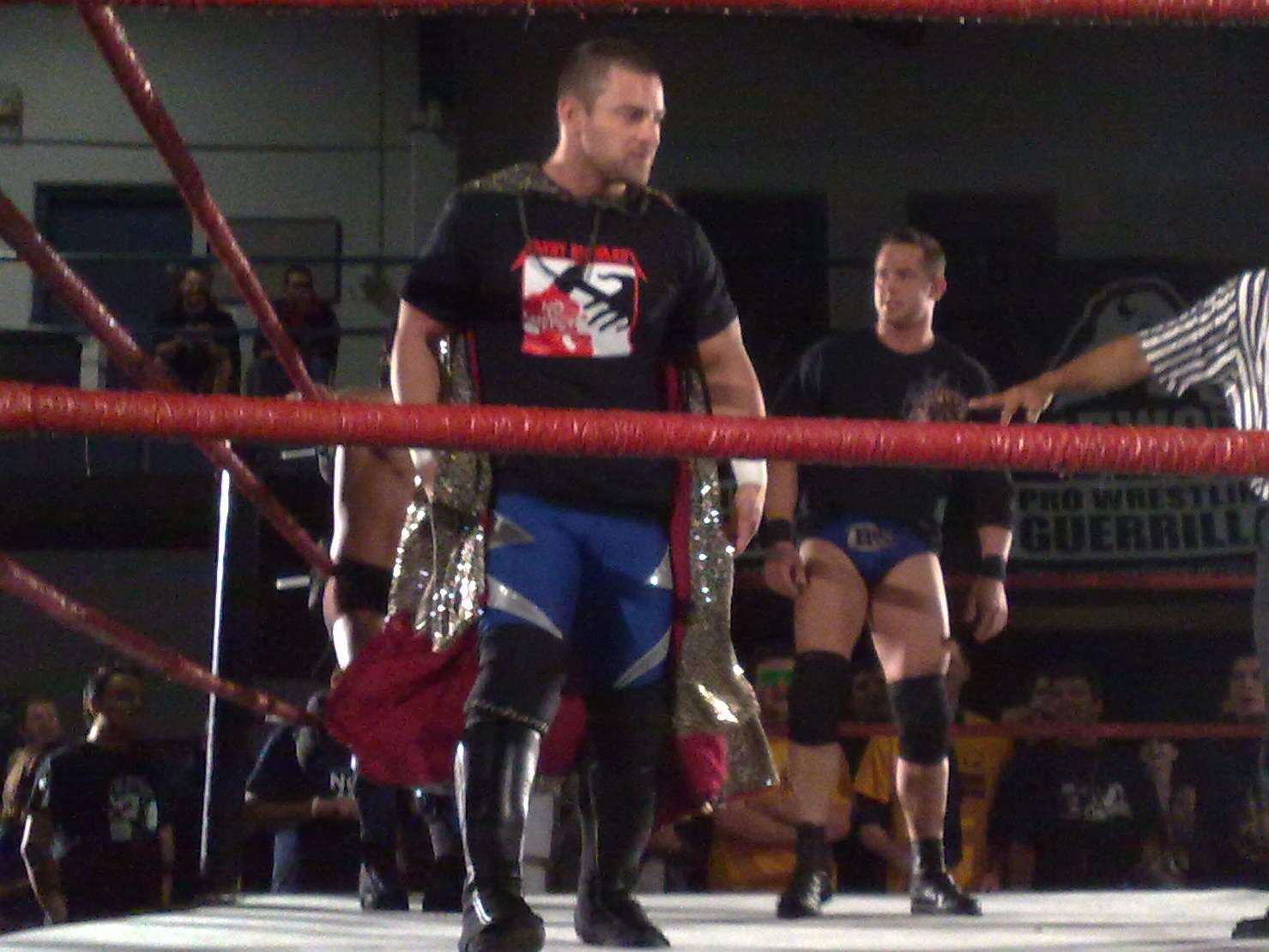
- (Left to right) Davey Richards and Roderick Strong, two thirds of the No Remorse Corps

Stable
- Members: Davey Richards; Rocky Romero; Roderick Strong
- Name: No Remorse Corps
- Debut: February 16, 2007
- Disbanded: June 7, 2008
- Years active: 2007–2008; 2010–2012

No Remorse Corps (often abbreviated to N.R.C.) was a professional wrestling stable, made up of Davey Richards, Rocky Romero and Roderick Strong. The stable worked for Ring of Honor (ROH) between 2007 and 2008, with Richards and Romero capturing the ROH World Tag Team Championship. Richards and Romero later reunited as a tag team in New Japan Pro-Wrestling (NJPW), where, between 2010 and 2012, they won the IWGP Junior Heavyweight Tag Team Championship on two occasions.

== History ==
=== Ring of Honor (2007–2008) ===
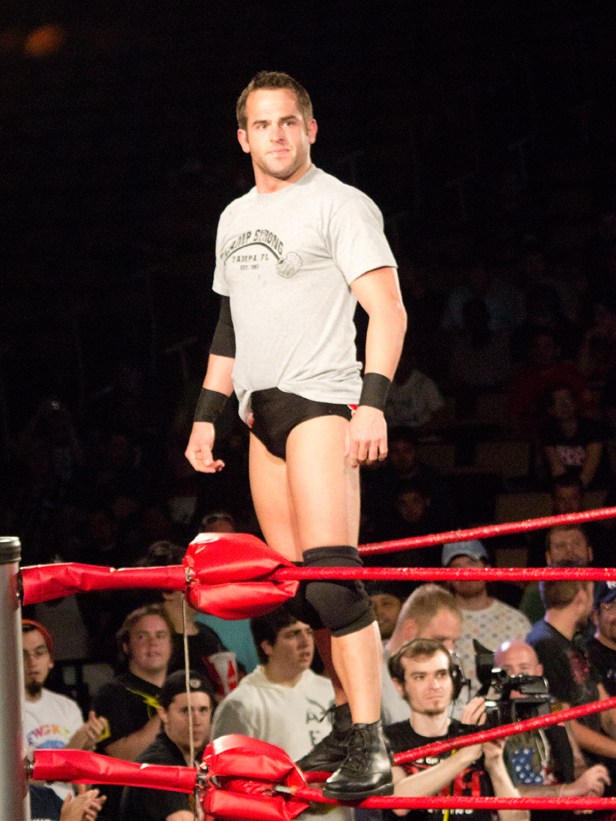
Roderick Strong, the leader of the first incarnation of the No Remorse Corps

From 2005 to 2007, Austin Aries and Roderick Strong were one of the most prolific tag teams in Ring of Honor (ROH) history. Originally joining the promotion as members of the Generation Next stable, the two remained together once the stable broke up, winning the ROH Tag Team Championship in 2005 and making the title the ROH World Tag Team Championship by defending it in the United Kingdom during their reign. Their reign ended on September 16, 2006, which started a storyline, where the two began suffering a series of frustrating tag team losses. On February 16, 2007, Aries and Strong received a shot at the ROH World Tag Team Championship, but were defeated by the defending champions, Christopher Daniels and Matt Sydal. After the match, Strong turned on Aries, attacking him with help from Davey Richards, before announcing that the two were forming a new stable named "No Remorse Corps" (N.R.C.). They were then chased away from the ring by Jack Evans, another former member of Generation Next. Strong and Richards had previously teamed up in the Pro Wrestling Guerrilla (PWG) promotion, where they held the PWG World Tag Team Championship for a day in 2006.

The day after the big development, Evans tried to make peace between Aries and Strong, who both refused to listen to him, instead telling him to choose a side in the rivalry. Aries eventually accepted Evans' decision not to choose a side and announced that he was forming a new stable to go to war with the N.R.C. On February 24, Matt Cross agreed to join Aries' new stable, which led to the first official match in the rivalry, where the two defeated Strong and Richards. Over the next weeks, the No Remorse Corps added a third member, Rocky Romero, who had just returned to ROH from an extended stay in Japan, while Aries' stable, now named "The Resilience", added Erick Stevens, Strong's former protégé. The two stables feuded for the rest of 2007 with N.R.C. dominating their rivals, partly due to Aries spending several months away from ROH due to a contract dispute with the Total Nonstop Action Wrestling (TNA) promotion. While Aries was away, Cross and Stevens were aided by Delirious and Bryan Danielson, the latter of whom had turned down an earlier offer to join the N.R.C. Eventually, Jack Evans also joined the feud with his own stable, the Vulture Squad, but Strong and the No Remorse Corps continued dominating the rivalry between the former Generation Next members.

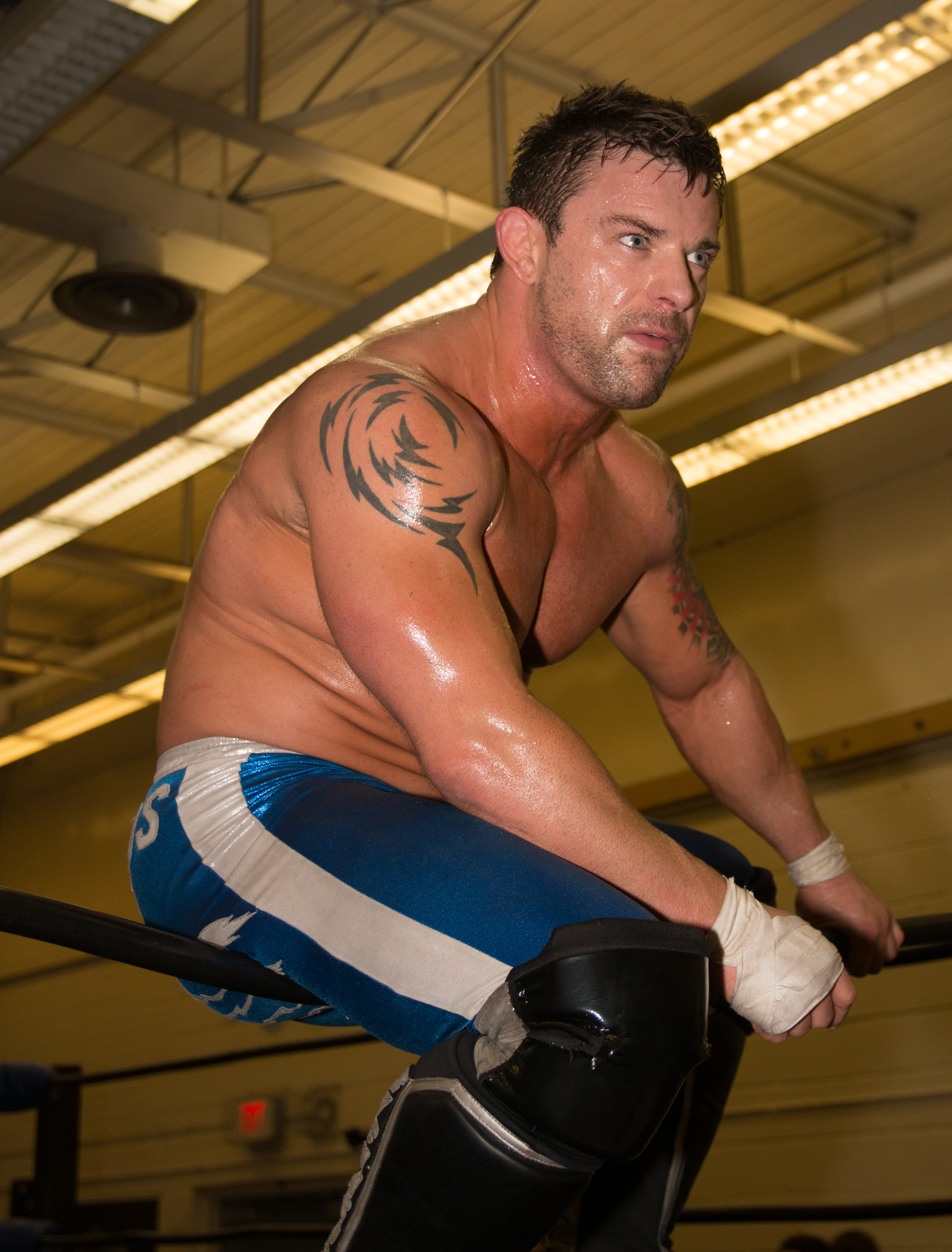
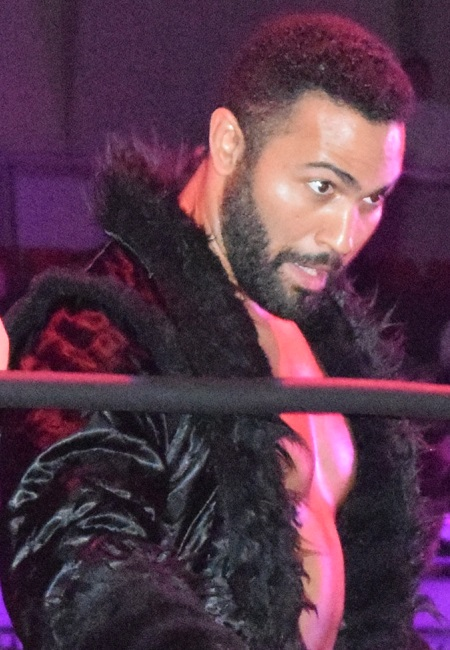
Davey Richards and Rocky Romero

On November 2, 2007, N.R.C. received its first title shot, when Strong and Romero unsuccessfully challenged the Briscoe Brothers (Jay and Mark) for the ROH World Tag Team Championship. After Richards and Romero also failed to capture the title on November 30, Strong and Romero received another shot at the Briscoe Brothers on December 29 at Rising Above, but were again defeated in a two out of three falls match. N.R.C. finally won the title on January 26, 2008, when Richards and Romero defeated the reigning champions, The Age of the Fall (Jimmy Jacobs and Tyler Black), The Hangm3n (B. J. Whitmer and Brent Albright) and Austin Aries and Bryan Danielson in a four-way "Ultimate Endurance" match. With the win, all three members of N.R.C. now held titles in ROH with Strong being the World Heavyweight Champion of ROH's sister promotion Full Impact Pro (FIP). Richards and Romero held the title until April 12, when they were defeated by the Briscoe Brothers. On June 6, Strong and Richards entered a tournament in an attempt to regain the now vacant ROH World Tag Team Championship, but were defeated in their first round match by Austin Aries and Bryan Danielson. Throughout the first half of 2008, ROH presented a storyline, where Larry Sweeney made repeated attempts to purchase the No Remorse Corps into merging with his Sweet & Sour Inc. stable. While Richards was for the merger, Strong refused to sell out to Sweeney. The storyline culminated on June 7, when Strong, after once again turning down the offer, was attacked by Richards, who then removed his N.R.C. shirt, revealing a Sweet & Sour Inc. shirt underneath. Following the incident, Strong disbanded the No Remorse Corps.

=== New Japan Pro-Wrestling (2010–2012) ===
In May 2010, Richards began working for New Japan Pro-Wrestling (NJPW), where Romero had been a semi-regular for the past several years. On November 9, Richards and Romero reunited for the 2010 Super J Tag League, representing the Chaos stable and defeating former two-time IWGP Junior Heavyweight Tag Team Champions Apollo 55 (Prince Devitt and Ryusuke Taguchi) in their opening match. The two eventually made it to the finals of the tournament, where, on November 13, they were defeated by their Chaos stablemates Gedo and Jado. In 2011, Romero began working for NJPW more regularly, which led to him and Richards readopting the No Remorse Corps name as the name of their now full-time tag team. They quickly entered a storyline rivalry with Apollo 55, which built to a match on May 3 at Wrestling Dontaku 2011, where Apollo 55 successfully defended their IWGP Junior Heavyweight Tag Team Championship.

A rematch took place on October 10 at Destruction '11, where Richards and Romero were victorious, becoming the new IWGP Junior Heavyweight Tag Team Champions. They made their first and only title defense a month later at Power Struggle, defeating Kushida and Tiger Mask. On January 4, 2012, at Wrestle Kingdom VI in Tokyo Dome, Richards and Romero lost the title back to Apollo 55. However, only a month later at The New Beginning, they regained the title from Apollo 55, starting their second title reign. They were scheduled to make their first title defense on May 3 at Wrestling Dontaku 2012, but the day before the event NJPW announced that Richards had not been able to make his flight to Japan due to a car accident, leading the promotion to stripping him and Romero of the IWGP Junior Heavyweight Tag Team Championship. Following the incident, Richards did not return to NJPW, leading to Romero forming a new tag team named Forever Hooligans with Alex Koslov.

== Championships and accomplishments ==
- Full Impact Pro
  - FIP World Heavyweight Championship (1 time) – Strong
- New Japan Pro-Wrestling
  - IWGP Junior Heavyweight Tag Team Championship (2 times) – Richards and Romero
- Ring of Honor
  - ROH World Tag Team Championship (1 time) – Richards and Romero
