= Wrestling Dontaku 2010 =

- Promotion: New Japan Pro-Wrestling
- Date: May 3, 2010
- City: Fukuoka, Japan
- Venue: Fukuoka Kokusai Center
- Attendance: 6,000

Pay-per-view chronology
← Previous; Circuit 2010: New Japan Ism	Next → Dominion 6.19

Wrestling Dontaku chronology
← Previous; 2009	Next → 2011

New Japan Pro-Wrestling events chronology
← Previous; Wrestle Kingdom IV	Next → Dominion 6.19

Wrestling Dontaku 2010 was a professional wrestling pay-per-view (PPV) event promoted by New Japan Pro-Wrestling (NJPW). The event took place on May 3, 2010, in Fukuoka, Fukuoka, at the Fukuoka Kokusai Center. The event featured nine matches (including one dark match), four of which were contested for championships. It was the seventh event under the Wrestling Dontaku name.

== Storylines ==
Wrestling Dontaku 2010 featured nine professional wrestling matches that involved different wrestlers from pre-existing scripted feuds and storylines. Wrestlers portrayed villains, heroes, or less distinguishable characters in the scripted events that built tension and culminated in a wrestling match or series of matches.

== Event ==
In the third match, NJPW veteran Jyushin Thunder Liger defeated Consejo Mundial de Lucha Libre (CMLL) representative Negro Casas to win the CMLL World Middleweight Championship. The event also featured the continuation of a three-way tag team rivalry between Bad Intentions (Giant Bernard and Karl Anderson), No Limit (Tetsuya Naito and Yujiro Takahashi) and Seigigun (Wataru Inoue and Yuji Nagata), with Seigigun capturing the IWGP Tag Team Championship from No Limit. Pro Wrestling Noah's Naomichi Marufuji successfully defended his IWGP Junior Heavyweight Championship against Ryusuke Taguchi during the event. In the main event, Togi Makabe, a decade after his first Wrestling Dontaku appearance, defeated Shinsuke Nakamura to win the IWGP Heavyweight Championship for the first time.

== Results ==
No.	Results	Stipulations	Times
1^{D}	Mitsuhide Hirasawa defeated Nobuo Yoshihashi	Singles match	05:44
2	Akira, Tiger Mask and Tomoaki Honma defeated Chaos (Gedo, Takashi Iizuka and Tomohiro Ishii)	Six-man tag team match	07:56
3	Manabu Nakanishi defeated King Fale by submission	Singles match	08:15
4	Jushin Thunder Liger defeated Negro Casas (c)	Singles match for the CMLL World Middleweight Championship	10:04
5	Seigigun (Wataru Inoue and Yuji Nagata) defeated No Limit (Tetsuya Naito and Yujiro Takahashi) (c) and Bad Intentions (Giant Bernard and Karl Anderson)	Three-way tag team match for the IWGP Tag Team Championship	12:20
6	Hirooki Goto vs. Masato Tanaka ended in a draw	Singles match	13:41
7	Naomichi Marufuji (c) defeated Ryusuke Taguchi	Singles match for the IWGP Junior Heavyweight Championship	22:40
8	Toru Yano defeated Hiroshi Tanahashi	Singles match	16:57
9	Togi Makabe defeated Shinsuke Nakamura (c)	Singles match for the IWGP Heavyweight Championship	18:18
(c) / – the champion(s) heading into the match; D / – this was a dark match
