= Wrestling Dontaku 2012 =

- Promotional poster for the event, featuring various NJPW wrestlers
- Promotion: New Japan Pro-Wrestling
- Date: May 3, 2012
- City: Fukuoka, Japan
- Venue: Fukuoka Kokusai Center
- Attendance: 6,500

Pay-per-view chronology
← Previous; Hataage Kinenbi (2012)	Next → Dominion 6.16

Wrestling Dontaku chronology
← Previous; 2011	Next → 2013

New Japan Pro-Wrestling events chronology
← Previous; The New Beginning	Next → Dominion 6.16

Wrestling Dontaku 2012 was a professional wrestling pay-per-view (PPV) event promoted by New Japan Pro-Wrestling (NJPW). The event took place on May 3, 2012, in Fukuoka, Fukuoka, at the Fukuoka Kokusai Center. The event featured nine matches, three of which were contested for championships. It was the ninth event under the Wrestling Dontaku name.

== Storylines ==
Wrestling Dontaku 2012 featured nine professional wrestling matches that involved different wrestlers from pre-existing scripted feuds and storylines. Wrestlers portrayed villains, heroes, or less distinguishable characters in the scripted events that built tension and culminated in a wrestling match or series of matches.

== Event ==
No Remorse Corps (Davey Richards and Rocky Romero) were originally scheduled to defend the IWGP Junior Heavyweight Tag Team Championship against Jyushin Thunder Liger and Tiger Mask during the event, however, Richards was unable to make his flight to Japan due to a car accident. As a result, NJPW stripped Richards and Romero of the title and stopped working with Richards. The event featured two titles changing hands. In the first, Low Ki defeated Prince Devitt for the IWGP Junior Heavyweight Championship. This win made Low Ki only the second foreigner, after Devitt, to win the title twice. The second title change saw Takashi Iizuka and Toru Yano defeat Tencozy Police (Hiroyoshi Tenzan and Satoshi Kojima) for the IWGP Tag Team Championship. In the main event, IWGP Heavyweight Champion Kazuchika Okada successfully defended his title against the winner of the 2012 New Japan Cup, Hirooki Goto.

== Results ==
No.	Results	Stipulations	Times
1	Chaos (Jado, Tomohiro Ishii and Yoshi-Hashi) defeated Captain New Japan, Strong Man and Tama Tonga	Six-man tag team match	07:12
2	Suzuki-gun (Taichi and Taka Michinoku) defeated Kushida and Ryusuke Taguchi	Tag team match	08:16
3	Jyushin Thunder Liger and Tiger Mask defeated Chaos (Gedo and Rocky Romero)	Tag team match	07:50
4	Low Ki defeated Prince Devitt (c)	Singles match for the IWGP Junior Heavyweight Championship	21:01
5	Chaos (Takashi Iizuka and Toru Yano) defeated Tencozy Police (Hiroyoshi Tenzan and Satoshi Kojima) (c)	Tag team match for the IWGP Tag Team Championship	16:47
6	Suzuki-gun (Minoru Suzuki and Yoshihiro Takayama) defeated Togi Makabe and Yuji Nagata	Tag team match	13:43
7	Shinsuke Nakamura defeated Karl Anderson	Singles match	12:15
8	Hiroshi Tanahashi and Tetsuya Naito defeated Complete Players (Masato Tanaka and Yujiro Takahashi)	Tag team match	13:59
9	Kazuchika Okada (c) (with Gedo) defeated Hirooki Goto	Singles match for the IWGP Heavyweight Championship	24:55
(c) / – the champion(s) heading into the match
