= Wrestling Dontaku 2023 =

NJPW professional wrestling event in Fukuoka, Japan

Wrestling Dontaku
- Official logo of the event
- Promotion: New Japan Pro-Wrestling
- Date: May 3, 2023
- City: Fukuoka, Japan
- Venue: Fukuoka Kokusai Center
- Attendance: 4,489

Event chronology
← Previous; Satsuma no Kuni; Capital Collision	Next → Best of the Super Jr. 30; Resurgence

Wrestling Dontaku chronology
← Previous; 2022	Next → 2024

Wrestling Dontaku was a professional wrestling event promoted by New Japan Pro-Wrestling (NJPW). The event took place on May 3, 2023, in Fukuoka, at the Fukuoka Kokusai Center. It was the 18th event under the Wrestling Dontaku name.

== Storylines ==
Wrestling Dontaku will feature professional wrestling matches that involved different wrestlers from pre-existing scripted feuds and storylines. Wrestlers portrayed villains, heroes, or less distinguishable characters in the scripted events that built tension and culminated in a wrestling match or series of matches.

=== Event ===
The event started with the preshow Young Lion Hat-Trick challenge match in which Oskar Leube outmatched Ryohei Oiwa, Yuto Nakashima and Boltin Oleg. The first two matches of the event's main card were broadcast live on NJPW's YouTube channel. In the first bout, Toru Yano, Yoh, Hirooki Goto and Yoshi-Hashi picked up a victory over Evil, Yujiro Takahashi, Sho and Dick Togo, and in the second one, the IWGP Tag Team Champions and Strong Openweight Tag Team Champions Mark Davis, Kyle Fletcher and the Undisputed British Heavyweight Champion Great-O-Khan defeated Mikey Nicholls, Shane Haste and Kosei Fujita.

The first main card bout saw Shota Umino and the IWGP Junior Heavyweight Tag Team Champion The Jet Setters (Kushida and Kevin Knight) picking up a victory over the former junior tag team champions Catch 2/2 (Francesco Akira and TJP)) and Aaron Henare in six-man tag team competition, following the events from Road To Wrestling Dontaku 2023 of April 27, event where Akira and TJP dropped the championship to Kushida and Knight. Next up, Taichi, Yoshinobu Kanemaru and Douki picked up a victory over Tetsuya Naito, Shingo Takagi and Bushi in another six-man tag team action bout. In the sixth match of the night, Guerrillas of Destiny's Hikuleo defeated Kenta to win the Strong Openweight Championship, ending the latter's reign at 74 days and two consecutive defenses. Next up, Zack Sabre Jr. and Jeff Cobb battled into a fifteen-minute time limit draw for the NJPW World Television Championship which helped Sabre secure his fifth consecutive title defense in that respective reign. The eighth bout saw Kazuchika Okada, Tomohiro Ishii and Hiroshi Tanahashi defeating Minoru Suzuki, El Desperado and Ren Narita to win the NEVER Openweight 6-Man Tag Team Championship. It was the first time in Okada's career when he won another title except the IWGP World Heavyweight Championship and IWGP Heavyweight Championship. After the match, Shota Umino stepped up to announce the return of Jon Moxley to NJPW. In the semi main event, David Finlay defeated Tama Tonga to win the NEVER Openweight Championship.

In the main event, Sanada defeated the IWGP Junior Heavyweight Champion Hiromu Takahashi to secure his first defense in that respective reign. After the bout concluded, Yota Tsuji appeared as he returned from his foreign excursion and attacked Sanada, subsequently challenging him for the Heavyweight title on further notice.

== Results ==
No.	Results	Stipulations	Times
1^{D}	Oskar Leube defeated Ryohei Oiwa, Yuto Nakashima and Boltin Oleg	Young Lion Hat-Trick challenge match	2:33
2^{P}	Chaos (Toru Yano, Yoh and Bishamon (Hirooki Goto and Yoshi-Hashi)) defeated House of Torture (Evil, Yujiro Takahashi, Sho and Dick Togo)	Eight-man tag team match	3:37
3^{P}	United Empire (Aussie Open (Mark Davis and Kyle Fletcher) and Great-O-Khan) defeated TMDK (Mikey Nicholls, Shane Haste and Kosei Fujita)	Six-man tag team match	5:28
4	Shota Umino and The Jet Setters (Kushida and Kevin Knight) defeated United Empire (Aaron Henare and Catch 2/2 (Francesco Akira and TJP))	Six-man tag team match	6:28
5	Just 5 Guys (Taichi, Yoshinobu Kanemaru and Douki) defeated Los Ingobernables de Japon (Tetsuya Naito, Shingo Takagi and Bushi)	Six-man tag team match	7:17
6	Hikuleo defeated Kenta (c)	Singles match for the Strong Openweight Championship	9:45
7	Zack Sabre Jr. (c) vs. Jeff Cobb ended in a time-limit draw	Singles match for the NJPW World Television Championship	15:00
8	Chaos (Kazuchika Okada and Tomohiro Ishii) and Hiroshi Tanahashi defeated Strong Style (Minoru Suzuki, El Desperado and Ren Narita) (c)	Six-man tag team match for the NEVER Openweight 6-Man Tag Team Championship	19:36
9	David Finlay defeated Tama Tonga (c)	Singles match for the NEVER Openweight Championship	25:01
10	Sanada (c) defeated Hiromu Takahashi	Singles match for the IWGP World Heavyweight Championship	27:30
(c) / – the champion(s) heading into the match; D / – this was a dark match; P / – the match was broadcast on the pre-show
