= Battlefield (professional wrestling) =

1994 New Japan Pro-Wrestling event

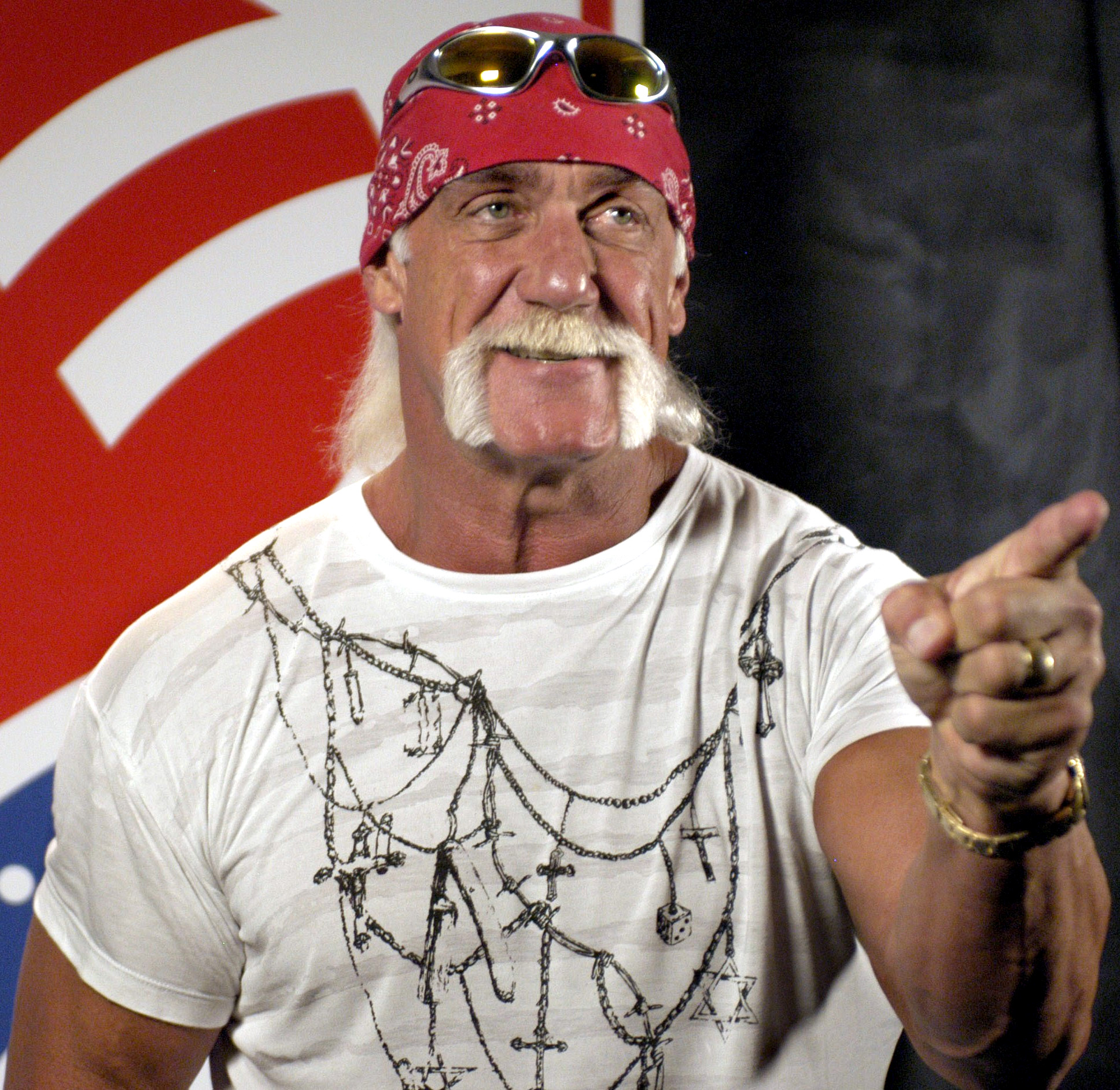
- Hulk Hogan, who defeated Tatsumi Fujinami at the event.
- Promotion: New Japan Pro-Wrestling
- Date: January 4, 1994
- City: Tokyo, Japan
- Venue: Tokyo Dome
- Attendance: 48,000

Pay-per-view chronology
← Previous; Wrestling Dontaku 1993	Next → Wrestling Dontaku 1994

January 4 Tokyo Dome Show chronology
← Previous; Fantastic Story in Tokyo Dome	Next → Battle 7

Battlefield was a professional wrestling television special event produced by New Japan Pro-Wrestling (NJPW). It took place on January 4, 1994 in the Tokyo Dome. The show drew 48,000 spectators.

Unlike the previous two years' January 4 events the 1994 show was not a co-promotion with World Championship Wrestling (WCW) although it did feature former WCW wrestlers The Steiner Brothers (Rick and Scott), who were working for WCW's rival, the World Wrestling Federation (WWF), at the time. The show also featured Brutus Beefcake and Hulk Hogan before they began working with WCW, working freelance for NJPW for one night.

The show featured 11 matches in total, including two title matches that saw The Hell Raisers (Hawk and Power Warrior) defeat The Jurassic Powers (Hercules Hernandez and Scott Norton) to win the IWGP Tag Team Championship, while Shinya Hashimoto successfully defended the IWGP Heavyweight Championship against Masahiro Chono. The show also featured a Mask vs. Mask match where Tiger Mask was unmasked and revealed as Koji Kanemoto.

== Production ==
Other on-screen personnel
Role:	Name:
English Commentators	Kevin Kelly
English Commentators	Chris Charlton
English Commentators	Rocky Romero
Japanese Commentators	Shinpei Nogami
Japanese Commentators	Milano Collection A.T.
Japanese Commentators	Katsuhiko Kanazawa
Japanese Commentators	Kazuyoshi Sakai
Japanese Commentators	Togi Makabe
Ring announcers	Makoto Abe
Ring announcers	Kimihiko Ozaki
Referees	Kenta Sato
Referees	Marty Asami
Referees	Red Shoes Unno

=== Background ===
The January 4 Tokyo Dome Show is NJPW's biggest annual event and has been called "the largest professional wrestling show in the world outside of the United States" and the "Japanese equivalent to the Super Bowl".

=== Storylines ===
Battlefield featured professional wrestling matches that involved different wrestlers from pre-existing scripted feuds and storylines. Wrestlers portrayed villains, heroes, or less distinguishable characters in scripted events that built tension and culminated in a wrestling match or series of matches.

== Results ==
No.	Results	Stipulations	Times
1	Heisei Ishingun (The Great Kabuki, Kengo Kimura, Kuniaki Kobayashi, Michiyoshi Ohara and Shiro Koshinaka) defeated El Samurai, Manabu Nakanishi, Osamu Kido, Satoshi Kojima and Yuji Nagata	Ten-man tag team match	12:09
2	Akira Nogami and Takayuki Iizuka defeated Akitoshi Saito and Masashi Aoyagi	Tag team match	14:07
3	Brutus Beefcake defeated Black Cat	Singles match	08:06
4	Super Strong Machine defeated Tatsutoshi Goto	Singles match	08:51
5	Jushin Thunder Liger defeated Tiger Mask	Mask vs. Mask match	14:26
6	The Hell Raisers (Hawk and Power Warrior) defeated The Jurassic Powers (Hercules Hernandez and Scott Norton) (c)	Tag team match for the IWGP Tag Team Championship	12:47
7	The Steiner Brothers (Rick Steiner and Scott Steiner) defeated Hiroshi Hase and Keiji Mutoh	Tag team match	20:51
8	Hulk Hogan defeated Tatsumi Fujinami	Singles match	13:33
9	Riki Choshu defeated Yoshiaki Fujiwara	Singles match	09:04
10	Shinya Hashimoto (c) defeated Masahiro Chono	Singles match for the IWGP Heavyweight Championship	28:00
11	Genichiro Tenryu defeated Antonio Inoki	Singles match	15:56
(c) / – the champion(s) heading into the match
