= Wrestling Dontaku 2011 =

Japanese professional wrestling event taking place in 2011

- Promotional poster for the event, featuring various NJPW wrestlers
- Promotion: New Japan Pro-Wrestling
- Date: May 3, 2011
- City: Fukuoka, Japan
- Venue: Fukuoka Kokusai Center
- Attendance: 6,500

Pay-per-view chronology
← Previous; New Dimension: Pray, Hope, Power	Next → Dominion 6.18

Wrestling Dontaku chronology
← Previous; 2010	Next → 2012

New Japan Pro-Wrestling events chronology
← Previous; The New Beginning	Next → Dominion 6.18

Wrestling Dontaku 2011 was a professional wrestling pay-per-view (PPV) event promoted by New Japan Pro-Wrestling (NJPW). The event took place on May 3, 2011, in Fukuoka, Fukuoka, at the Fukuoka Kokusai Center. The event featured 10 matches, 4 of which were contested for championships. It was the eighth event under the Wrestling Dontaku name.

== Storylines ==
Wrestling Dontaku 2011 featured ten professional wrestling matches that involved different wrestlers from pre-existing scripted feuds and storylines. Wrestlers portrayed villains, heroes, or less distinguishable characters in the scripted events that built tension and culminated in a wrestling match or series of matches.

== Event ==
Jyushin Thunder Liger continued his reign as the CMLL World Middleweight Champion, which had started at the previous year's Wrestling Dontaku, by defeating Consejo Mundial de Lucha Libre (CMLL) wrestler Máscara Dorada. Both IWGP tag team titles were successfully defended during the event, with Junior Heavyweight Champions Apollo 55 (Prince Devitt and Ryusuke Taguchi) defeating the No Remorse Corps (Davey Richards and Rocky Romero) and Heavyweight Champions Bad Intentions (Giant Bernard and Karl Anderson) defeating No Limit (Tetsuya Naito and Yujiro Takahashi). The event also featured two major storyline developments. In the first, following No Limit's failure to recapture the IWGP Tag Team Championship, Yujiro Takahashi walked out on Tetsuya Naito, which later led to a bitter feud between the two. In the second, Taichi and Taka Michinoku turned on Satoshi Kojima, after his loss against Togi Makabe, and formed Suzuki-gun under the leadership of Minoru Suzuki, who made his surprise return to confront Makabe. The event also marked the return of Hirooki Goto, who had spent the past two months in CMLL. In the main event, Hiroshi Tanahashi successfully defended the IWGP Heavyweight Championship against Shinsuke Nakamura, after which he was attacked by Goto, who was now displaying a new mean streak.

== Results ==
No.	Results	Stipulations	Times
1	Hiromu Takahashi, Manabu Nakanishi and Tomoaki Honma defeated Chaos (Gedo, Jado and Killer Rabbit)	Six-man tag team match	04:36
2	Kojima-gun (Taichi and Taka Michinoku) defeated Kushida and Tiger Mask	Tag team match	06:43
3	Chaos (Takashi Iizuka, Tomohiro Ishii and Toru Yano) defeated Hiroyoshi Tenzan, King Fale and Wataru Inoue	Six-man tag team match	07:57
4	Jyushin Thunder Liger (c) defeated Máscara Dorada	Singles match for the CMLL World Middleweight Championship	10:04
5	Apollo 55 (Prince Devitt and Ryusuke Taguchi) (c) defeated No Remorse Corps (Davey Richards and Rocky Romero)	Tag team match for the IWGP Junior Heavyweight Tag Team Championship	17:41
6	Bad Intentions (Giant Bernard and Karl Anderson) (c) defeated No Limit (Tetsuya Naito and Yujiro Takahashi)	Tag team match for the IWGP Tag Team Championship	19:49
7	Hirooki Goto and Tama Tonga defeated Makoto Hashi and Takashi Sugiura	Tag Team match	09:43
8	Yuji Nagata defeated Masato Tanaka	Singles match	14:53
9	Togi Makabe defeated Satoshi Kojima	Singles match	11:51
10	Hiroshi Tanahashi (c) defeated Shinsuke Nakamura	Singles match for the IWGP Heavyweight Championship	20:17
(c) / – the champion(s) heading into the match
