= Wrestling Dontaku 1993 =

1993 New Japan Pro-Wrestling event

- Promotion: New Japan Pro-Wrestling
- Date: May 3, 1993
- City: Fukuoka, Japan
- Venue: Fukuoka Dome
- Attendance: 55,000

Wrestling Dontaku chronology
← Previous; First	Next → 1994

NJPW Events chronology
← Previous; Fantastic Story in Tokyo Dome	Next → Battlefield

Wrestling Dontaku 1993 was the first Wrestling Dontaku professional wrestling television special event produced by New Japan Pro-Wrestling (NJPW). The event took place on May 3, 1993, in Fukuoka, Fukuoka at the Fukuoka Dome. As part of working relationships between NJPW and American promotions World Championship Wrestling (WCW) and World Wrestling Federation (WWF), WCW's Sting and WWF's Brutus Beefcake, Hulk Hogan and Jimmy Hart took part in the event. Professional wrestlers from Japanese promotion Wrestle and Romance (WAR) also appeared at the event.

The event featured ten professional wrestling matches. The main event was a tag team match featuring Japanese wrestling's top four wrestlers as Antonio Inoki and Tatsumi Fujinami teamed to take on Genichiro Tenryu and Riki Choshu. Inoki and Fujinami won the match. The event also featured a "dream match" between Hulk Hogan, the reigning WWF Champion, and The Great Muta, the reigning IWGP Heavyweight Champion.

== Event ==
=== Preliminary matches ===
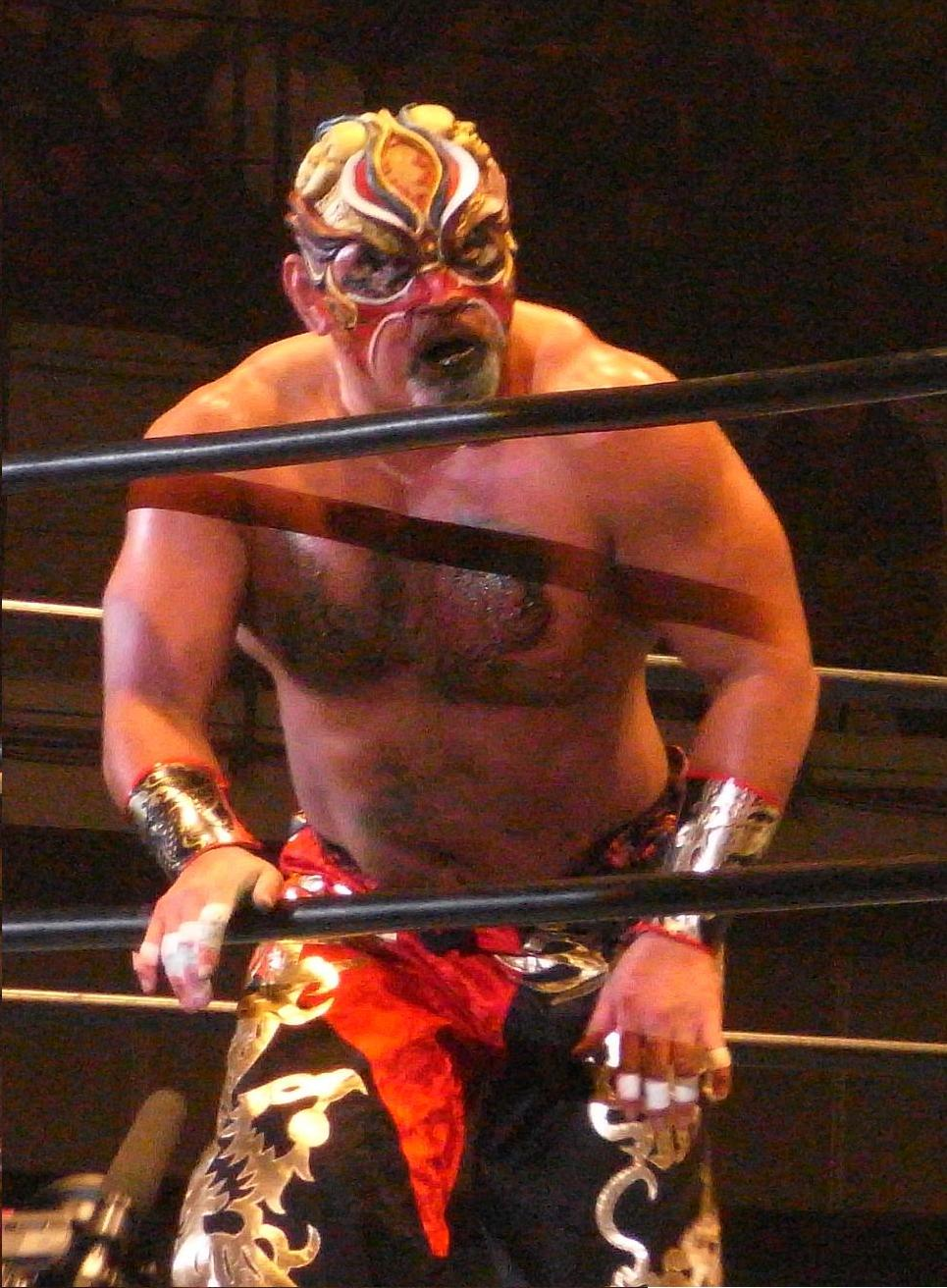
IWGP Heavyweight Champion The Great Muta represented NJPW in the first main event of the show.

The opening match was a six-man tag team match pitting the team of Akira Nogami, El Samurai and Takayuki Iizuka against Hiroyoshi Yamamoto, Osamu Nishimura and Satoshi Kojima. In the end, Nogami hit a full nelson suplex to Yamamoto for the win.

Next, Akitoshi Saito took on Michiyoshi Ohara. In the climax, Ohara executed a powerbomb on Saito for the win.

Next, Masa Saito took on WWF wrestler Brutus Beefcake. In the end, Saito delivered two Saito Suplexes to Beefcake until Beefcake's manager Jimmy Hart climbed on the apron to distract the referee, allowing Beefcake to hit Saito with Hart's megaphone and then he hit two headbutts to Saito for the win.

Next, the Heisei Ishingun members The Great Kabuki, Kengo Kimura, Kuniaki Kobayashi, Masashi Aoyagi and Shiro Koshinaka took on Ashura Hara, Hiro Saito, Super Strong Machine, Takashi Ishikawa and Tatsutoshi Goto in a ten-man tag team match. In the climax, Koshinaka executed a powerbomb to Goto for the win.

The following match featured junior heavyweight wrestlers Jushin Liger and Tiger Mask competing against each other. Tiger Mask delivered a Tiger Suplex to Liger for the win.

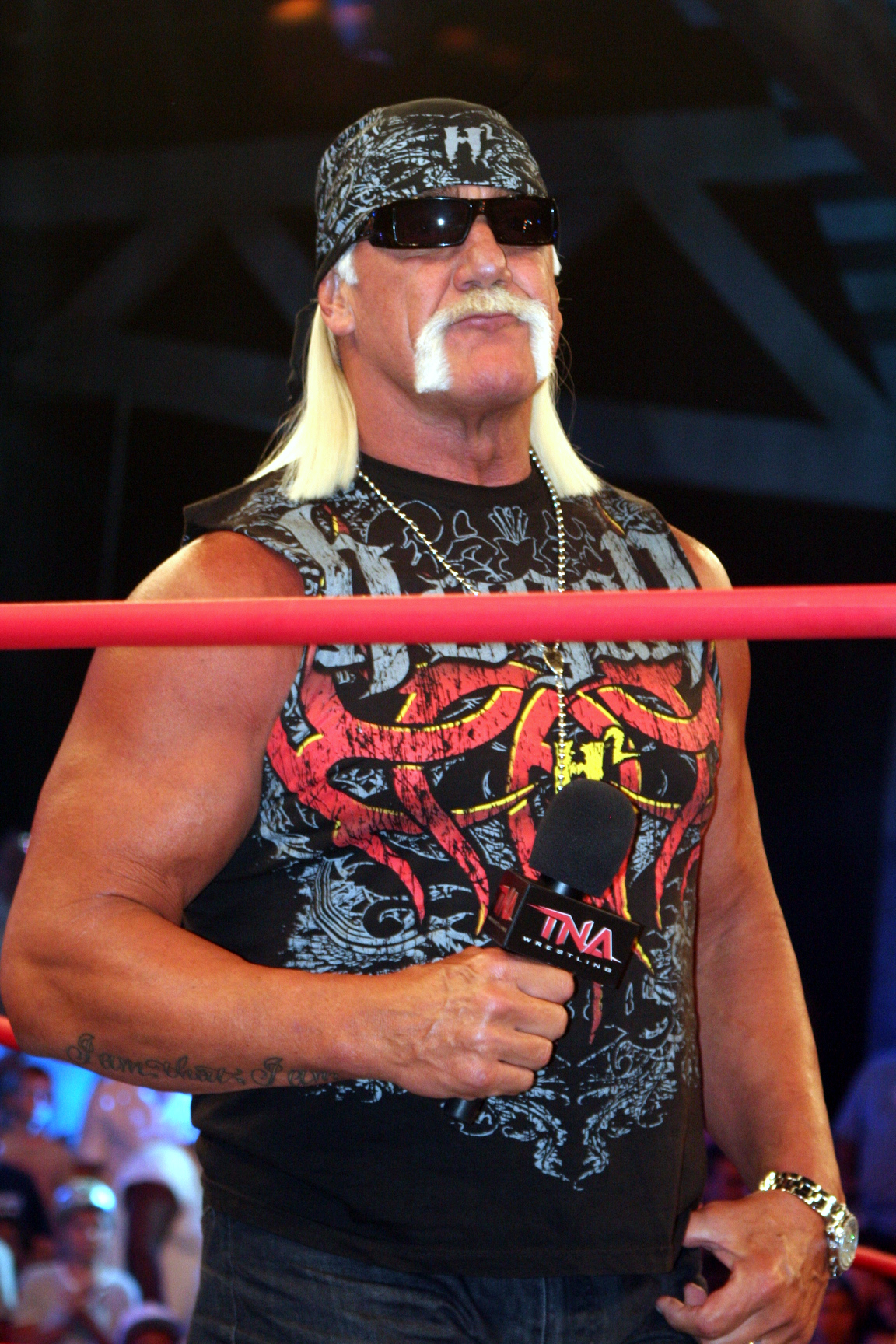
WWF Champion Hulk Hogan wrestled the IWGP Heavyweight Champion The Great Muta in the most popular match of the event.

Next, Scott Norton took on WCW wrestler Sting. Near the end of the match, Sting hit a face crusher to Norton but got a near-fall and then Norton began brawling with Sting but he suffered a cut on his face and then Sting continued to attack Norton and the referee stopped the match due to Norton's injury and Sting's valiant assault, forcing the referee to end the match in a double disqualification.

Next, Yoshiaki Fujiwara took on Hiroshi Hase. In the climax, Fujiwara made Hase submit to the Fujiwara armbar for the win.

Later, The Hell Raisers (Hawk Warrior and Power Warrior) took on the team of Masahiro Chono and Shinya Hashimoto. In the end, Hell Raisers executed a Double Impact on Chono for the win.

The penultimate match of the event was a champion vs. champion dream match between the IWGP Heavyweight Champion The Great Muta and the WWF Champion Hulk Hogan. Near the end of the match, Hogan hit a leg drop on Muta, but Muta kicked out of the pinfall attempt and then Hogan nailed an Axe Bomber to Muta for the win. In a post-match interview, Hogan infamously remarked that he considered the WWF Championship to be "just a toy" and saw the IWGP Heavyweight Championship as the greatest prize in professional wrestling.

=== Main event match ===
The main event was a tag team match featuring Antonio Inoki and Tatsumi Fujinami against Genichiro Tenryu and Riki Choshu. Fujinami won the match by making Tenryu submit to the Cobra Twist in the end.

== Reception ==
Wrestling Dontaku was a huge success as the event drew a huge crowd of 55,000 spectators at the Fukuoka Dome. However, the event received mixed reviews from critics. Kevin Wilson of Puroresu Central considered that he would not recommend the event to watch, with "Muta vs. Hogan was a spectacle worth watching but nothing else on this tape is worth going out of your way to see. The main event was old school, but nothing great. The Liger match was disappointing, the Sting match was short and inconclusive, the Warriors match was fun but pretty normal for them and the rest ranged from bad to decent." He praised the champion vs. champion match between Muta and Hogan, considering it the best match of the event and the only worthwhile match of the event. He gave the match a rating of 7.6. The main event tag team match considered it to be "classic old school battle, consisting of submission holds (many meaningless) and a slow pace that builds up to a hot ending. There was nothing really wrong with this match, but it was pretty slow and the crowd only got really into it when Inoki was involved". He noted that the match got underway just due to Inoki's fanbase but the quality of the match "wasn’t great by any means".

== Results ==
No.	Results	Stipulations	Times
1	Akira Nogami, El Samurai and Takayuki Iizuka defeated Hiroyoshi Yamamoto, Osamu Nishimura and Satoshi Kojima	Six-man tag team match	15:01
2	Michiyoshi Ohara defeated Akitoshi Saito	Singles match	09:26
3	Brutus Beefcake (with Jimmy Hart) defeated Masa Saito	Singles match	08:35
4	Heisei Ishingun (Great Kabuki, Kengo Kimura, Kuniaki Kobayashi, Masashi Aoyagi and Shiro Koshinaka) defeated Ashura Hara, Hiro Saito, Super Strong Machine, Takashi Ishikawa and Tatsutoshi Goto	Ten-man tag team match	11:26
5	Tiger Mask defeated Jyushin Thunder Liger	Singles match	14:25
6	Scott Norton vs. Sting ended in a no contest	Singles match	09:16
7	Yoshiaki Fujiwara defeated Hiroshi Hase via submission	Singles match	12:11
8	The Hell Raisers (Hawk Warrior and Power Warrior) defeated Masahiro Chono and Shinya Hashimoto	Tag team match	12:22
9	Hulk Hogan (with Jimmy Hart) defeated The Great Muta	Singles match	15:55
10	Antonio Inoki and Tatsumi Fujinami defeated Genichiro Tenryu and Riki Choshu via submission	Tag team match	26:35
