= Wrestling Dontaku 2019 =

2019 New Japan Pro-Wrestling event

- Promotion: New Japan Pro-Wrestling
- Date: May 3-4, 2019
- City: Fukuoka, Japan
- Venue: Fukuoka Kokusai Center
- Attendance: 10,116 (total); Night 1: 4,011; Night 2: 6,105

Event chronology
← Previous; G1 Supercard; Wrestling Hinokuni	Next → Best of the Super Juniors 26; War of the Worlds

Wrestling Dontaku chronology
← Previous; 2018	Next → —

Wrestling Dontaku 2019 was a professional wrestling event promoted by New Japan Pro-Wrestling (NJPW). The event took place on May 3 and 4, 2019, in Fukuoka, at the Fukuoka Kokusai Center.

The first night of the event featured eight matches, with two championships at stake, while the second night featured a championship match out of eight matches overall. The main event of the first night was Dragon Lee defending the IWGP Junior Heavyweight Champion against Taiji Ishimori, and the second night's main event was Kazuchika Okada defending the IWGP Heavyweight Championship against Sanada. This was the sixteenth event under the Wrestling Dontaku name.

== Storylines ==
Each night of Wrestling Dontaku 2019 featured eight professional wrestling matches that involved different wrestlers from pre-existing scripted feuds and storylines. Wrestlers portrayed villains, heroes, or less distinguishable characters in the scripted events that built tension and culminated in a wrestling match or series of matches.

== Results ==
=== Night 1 ===
No.	Results	Stipulations	Times
1	Ren Narita, Shota Umino and Tomoaki Honma defeated Toa Henare, Yota Tsuji and Yuya Uemura	Six-man tag team match	10:46
2	Suzuki-gun (El Desperado, Minoru Suzuki, Taka Michinoku and Yoshinobu Kanemaru) defeated Ryusuke Taguchi, Tiger Mask, Jyushin Thunder Liger and Yoshi-Hashi	Eight-man tag team match	9:57
3	Chaos (Toru Yano and Will Ospreay) and Togi Makabe defeated Bullet Club (Hikuleo, Tama Tonga and Tanga Loa)	Six-man tag team match	7:25
4	Roppongi 3K (Sho and Yoh) and Kota Ibushi defeated Los Ingobernables de Japón (Tetsuya Naito, Bushi and Shingo Takagi	Six-man tag team match	11:31
5	Chaos (Hirooki Goto and Mikey Nicholls) and Juice Robinson defeated Bullet Club (Bad Luck Fale, Chase Owens and Jay White)	Six-man tag team match	11:23
6	Los Ingobernables de Japón (Evil and Sanada) defeated Chaos (Kazuchika Okada and Tomohiro Ishii) by referee stoppage	Tag team match	16:52
7	Taichi defeated Jeff Cobb (c)	Singles match for the NEVER Openweight Championship	17:50
8	Dragon Lee (c) defeated Taiji Ishimori	Singles match for IWGP Junior Heavyweight Championship	25:53
(c) / – the champion(s) heading into the match

=== Night 2 ===
No.	Results	Stipulations	Times
1	Ren Narita and Shota Umino defeated Yota Tsuji and Yuya Uemura	Tag team match	7:36
2	Suzuki-gun (El Desperado, Minoru Suzuki, Taichi, Taka Michinoku and Yoshinobu Kanemaru) defeated Ryusuke Taguchi, Tiger Mask, Jeff Cobb, Toa Henare and Yoshi-Hashi	Ten-man tag team match	11:16
3	Jyushin Thunder Liger and Most Violent Players (Toru Yano and Togi Makabe) defeated Bullet Club (Jado, Tama Tonga and Tanga Loa)	Six-man tag team match	7:40
4	Chaos (Hirooki Goto and Mikey Nicholls), Juice Robinson and Tomoaki Honma defeated Bullet Club (Bad Luck Fale, Chase Owens, Hikuleo and Jay White)	Eight-man tag team match	11:57
5	Bullet Club (El Phantasmo and Taiji Ishimori) defeated Dragon Lee and Will Ospreay	Tag team match	9:58
6	Los Ingobernables de Japón (Bushi, Shingo Takagi and Tetsuya Naito) defeated Roppongi 3K (Sho and Yoh) and Kota Ibushi	Six-man tag team match	13:47
7	Tomohiro Ishii defeated Evil	Singles match	23:08
8	Kazuchika Okada (c) defeated Sanada	Singles match for the IWGP Heavyweight Championship	38:03
(c) / – the champion(s) heading into the match
