= Wrestling Dontaku 2009 =

- Promotion: New Japan Pro-Wrestling
- Date: May 3, 2009
- City: Fukuoka, Japan
- Venue: Fukuoka Kokusai Center
- Attendance: 5,500

Pay-per-view chronology
← Previous; Wrestle Kingdom III	Next → Dominion 6.20

Wrestling Dontaku chronology
← Previous; 2001	Next → 2010

Wrestling Dontaku 2009 was a professional wrestling pay-per-view (PPV) event promoted by New Japan Pro-Wrestling (NJPW). The event took place on May 3, 2009, in Fukuoka, Fukuoka, at the Fukuoka Kokusai Center. The event featured nine matches (including one dark match), one of which was contested for a championship. It was the sixth event and first in eight years under the Wrestling Dontaku name.

== Storylines ==
Wrestling Dontaku 2009 featured nine professional wrestling matches that involved different wrestlers from pre-existing scripted feuds and storylines. Wrestlers portrayed villains, heroes, or less distinguishable characters in the scripted events that built tension and culminated in a wrestling match or series of matches.

== Event ==
Cima from Dragon Gate worked the event as an outsider. In the semi main event of the evening, Giant Bernard and Karl Anderson defeated Tencozy (Hiroyoshi Tenzan and Satoshi Kojima) to become the number one contenders to the IWGP Tag Team Championship. In the main event, Hiroshi Tanahashi successfully defended the IWGP Heavyweight Championship against the winner of the 2009 New Japan Cup, Hirooki Goto, and afterwards nominated Manabu Nakanishi as his next challenger.

== Aftermath ==
Three days after Wrestling Dontaku 2009, Manabu Nakanishi defeated Hiroshi Tanahashi to win the IWGP Heavyweight Championship for the first time in what was considered a major upset.

== Results ==
No.	Results	Stipulations	Times
1^{D}	Mitsuhide Hirasawa defeated Nobuo Yoshihashi	Singles match	06:19
2	Unione (Milano Collection A.T. and Taichi) defeated Apollo 55 (Prince Devitt and Ryusuke Taguchi)	Tag team match	10:15
3	Akira, Kazuchika Okada and Wataru Inoue vs. Chaos (Black Tiger, Gedo and Jado) ended in a draw	Six-man tag team match	09:39
4	Wild Child (Manabu Nakanishi and Takao Omori) defeated Legend (Masahiro Chono and Riki Choshu)	Tag team match	12:07
5	Chaos (Shinsuke Nakamura and Toru Yano) defeated G.B.H. (Togi Makabe and Tomoaki Honma)	Tag team match	11:32
6	Cima and Jyushin Thunder Liger defeated Koji Kanemoto and Tiger Mask	Tag team match	13:03
7	Yuji Nagata defeated Takashi Iizuka	Dog Collar Chain Deathmatch	20:07
8	Chaos (Giant Bernard and Karl Anderson) defeated Tencozy (Hiroyoshi Tenzan and Satoshi Kojima)	Tag team match to determine the number one contender to the IWGP Tag Team Championship	18:44
9	Hiroshi Tanahashi (c) defeated Hirooki Goto	Singles match for the IWGP Heavyweight Championship	29:39
(c) / – the champion(s) heading into the match; D / – this was a dark match
