= Wrestling Dontaku 2024 =

2024 New Japan Pro-Wrestling professional wrestling event

Wrestling Dontaku
- Promotional poster of the event
- Promotion: New Japan Pro-Wrestling
- Date: May 3–4, 2024
- City: Fukuoka, Japan
- Venue: Fukuoka Kokusai Center
- Attendance: Night 1: 2,440; Night 2: 4,238; Total: 6,678

Event chronology
← Previous; Satsuma no Kuni; Windy City Riot	Next → All Together; Resurgence

Wrestling Dontaku chronology
← Previous; 2023	Next → 2025

Wrestling Dontaku 2024 was a two-night professional wrestling event promoted by New Japan Pro-Wrestling (NJPW). The event took place on May 3 and 4, 2024, in Fukuoka, at the Fukuoka Kokusai Center. It was the 19th event under the Wrestling Dontaku name.

== Storylines ==
Wrestling Dontaku featured professional wrestling matches that involved different wrestlers from pre-existing scripted feuds and storylines. Wrestlers portrayed villains, heroes, or less distinguishable characters in the scripted events that built tension and culminated in a wrestling match or series of matches.

== Night 1 (May 3) ==
=== Event ===
The first night of the event started with the preshow bout between Katsuya Murashima and Togi Makabe, and Shoma Kato and one third of the NEVER Openweight 6-Man Tag Team Champions Oleg Boltin solded with the victory of the latter team.

The first main card match saw the IWGP Junior Heavyweight Champion Sho and Yujiro Takahashi picking up a victory over Taka Michinoku and Douki in tag team action. Next up, KOPW Champion Yuya Uemura and Taichi defeated Callum Newman and Great-O-Khan in tag team competition. In the fourth bout, Jado, El Phantasmo and Hikuleo defeated Kosei Fujita and Strong Openweight Tag Team Champions Shane Haste and Mikey Nicholls in six-man tag team competition. Next up, Taiji Ishimori, Chase Owens and Kenta defeated Tigers Mask, Hirooki Goto and Yoshi-Hashi ahead of Owens, Kenta and Bishamon's confrontation for the IWGP Tag titles from one night later. In the sixth bout, Bushi, Hiromu Takahashi, Shingo Takagi and Tetsuya Naito obtained a victory over Gedo, IWGP Junior Heavyweight Tag Team Champions Clark Connors and Drilla Moloney, and Gabriel Kidd in eight-man tag team competition ahead of Takagi and Kidd's confrontation for the NEVER Openweight Championship from one night later. Next up, El Desperado, Shota Umino and Jon Moxley defeated Yoshinobu Kanemaru, Ren Narita and Evil via disqualification ahead of Narita and Moxley's match for the IWGP World Heavyweight Championship from one night later. Next up, Jeff Cobb defeated Zack Sabre Jr. to win the NJPW World Television Championship, ending the latter's reign at 21 days and no defenses. In the semi main event, David Finlay defeated Yota Tsuji in singles competition.

In the main event, Nic Nemeth defeated Hiroshi Tanahashi to secure the first defense of the IWGP Global Heavyweight Championship in that respective reign. After the bout concluded, former champion David Finlay jumped Nemeth as they brawled until the latter challenged Finlay to a rematch set for the second night of the event.

=== Results ===
No.	Results	Stipulations	Times
1^{P}	Shoma Kato and Oleg Boltin defeated Katsuya Murashima and Togi Makabe by pinfall	Tag team match	6:57
2	House of Torture (Sho and Yujiro Takahashi) defeated Just 5 Guys (Taka Michinoku and Douki) by pinfall	Tag team match	7:29
3	Just 5 Guys (Taichi and Yuya Uemura) defeated United Empire (Callum Newman and Great-O-Khan) by pinfall	Tag team match	9:14
4	Guerrillas of Destiny (Jado, Hikuleo and El Phantasmo) defeated TMDK (Kosei Fujita, Shane Haste and Mikey Nicholls) by pinfall	Six-man tag team match	6:55
5	Bullet Club (Taiji Ishimori, Kenta and Chase Owens) defeated Tiger Mask (Note: Ryusuke Taguchi was originally scheduled to compete but was replaced by Tiger Mask due to an injury which would also make him miss 2024's Best of the Super Juniors tournament.) and Bishamon (Hirooki Goto and Yoshi-Hashi) by pinfall	Six-man tag team match	7:34
6	Los Ingobernables de Japon (Tetsuya Naito, Shingo Takagi, Hiromu Takahashi and Bushi) defeated Bullet Club War Dogs (Gedo, Clark Connors, Drilla Moloney and Gabe Kidd) by submission	Eight-man tag team match	11:16
7	House of Torture (Evil, Ren Narita and Yoshinobu Kanemaru) defeated El Desperado, Shota Umino and Jon Moxley by pinfall	Six-man tag team match	8:44
8	Jeff Cobb defeated Zack Sabre Jr. (c) by pinfall	Singles match for the NJPW World Television Championship	13:28
9	David Finlay defeated Yota Tsuji by pinfall	Singles match	22:22
10	Nic Nemeth (c) defeated Hiroshi Tanahashi by pinfall	Singles match for the IWGP Global Heavyweight Championship	17:22
(c) / – the champion(s) heading into the match; P / – the match was broadcast on the pre-show

== Night 2 (May 4) ==
=== Results ===
No.	Results	Stipulations	Times
1^{P}	Katsuya Murashima and Togi Makabe defeated Jet Wei and Naoki Sakurajima by pinfall	Tag team match	7:07
2^{P}	TMDK (Shane Haste and Mikey Nicholls) defeated Shoma Kato and Tiger Mask by pinfall	Tag team match	8:10
3	United Empire (Great-O-Khan and Francesco Akira) defeated Just 5 Guys (Yuya Uemura and Douki) by pinfall	Tag team match	7:53
4	Ichiban Sweet Boys (Kosei Fujita and Zack Sabre Jr.) defeated United Empire (Callum Newman and Jeff Cobb) by pinfall	Tag team match	9:25
5	Guerrillas of Destiny (El Phantasmo and Hikuleo), El Desperado and Shota Umino (with Jado) defeated House of Torture (Evil, Sho, Yoshinobu Kanemaru and Yujiro Takahashi) (with Dick Togo) by pinfall	Eight-man tag team match	7:33
6	Oleg Boltin and Hiroshi Tanahashi defeated Just 5 Guys (Taka Michinoku and Taichi) by pinfall	Tag team match	8:57
7	Los Ingobernables de Japon (Bushi, Hiromu Takahashi, Yota Tsuji and Tetsuya Naito) defeated Bullet Club War Dogs (Gedo, Clark Connors, Drilla Moloney and Taiji Ishimori) by pinfall	Eight-man tag team match	10:02
8	Bullet Club (Kenta and Chase Owens) defeated Bishamon (Hirooki Goto and Yoshi-Hashi) (c) by pinfall	Tag team match for the IWGP Tag Team Championship	12:43
9	Shingo Takagi (c) defeated Gabe Kidd by pinfall	Singles match for the NEVER Openweight Championship	21:23
10	David Finlay (with Gedo) defeated Nic Nemeth (c) by pinfall	Singles match for the IWGP Global Heavyweight Championship	15:34
11	Jon Moxley (c) (with Shota Umino) defeated Ren Narita by pinfall	Singles match for the IWGP World Heavyweight Championship	25:18
(c) / – the champion(s) heading into the match; P / – the match was broadcast on the pre-show
