= Collision in Korea =

1995 wrestling pay-per-view event

- Poster featuring Antonio Inoki and Ric Flair
- Promotion(s): New Japan Pro-Wrestling; World Championship Wrestling
- Date: April 28–29, 1995 (aired August 4, 1995)
- City: Pyongyang, North Korea
- Venue: Rungrado 1st of May Stadium
- Attendance: Total: 315,000; Day One: 150,000; Day Two: 165,000
- Tagline: Two Legends, One Country

Pay-per-view chronology
← Previous; Bash at the Beach	Next → Fall Brawl

New Japan Pro-Wrestling events chronology
← Previous; Battle 7	Next → Wrestling Dontaku 1995

Peace Festival chronology
← Previous; Festival of Sports and Peace	Next → World Wrestling Peace Festival

Collision in Korea was a professional wrestling pay-per-view (PPV) event jointly produced by New Japan Pro-Wrestling (NJPW) and World Championship Wrestling (WCW). It was the finale of a North Korean festival, the Pyongyang International Sports and Culture Festival for Peace (平和のための平壌国際体育・文化祝典, Heiwa no tame no Pyon'yan kokusai taiiku bunka shukuten), which was also known as Pyongyang '95.

The event featured 15 matches over two evenings on April 28 and 29, 1995, at May Day Stadium in Pyongyang, North Korea. It aired in North America on August 4, 1995, when WCW broadcast a selection of eight matches from the show on pay-per-view. It was the first event hosted by an American professional wrestling promotion in the country.

The second day of the event holds the record for the largest ever attendance for a wrestling event, with a claimed audience of 190,000. The first day holds the record for the second-largest ever attendance, with a claimed audience of 165,000. Day one of the event generated a live gate of $7,500,000 (equivalent to $15,847,000 in 2025) and day two of the event generated $8,500,000 (equivalent to $17,960,000 in 2025), which were two of the biggest live gates ever in wrestling.

Retired boxer Muhammad Ali was the event's guest of honor. NJPW's Hidekazu Tanaka was the ring announcer for the show, while Masao Tayama and Tiger Hattori refereed the matches. Commentary for the WCW pay-per-view presentation of the event was provided by Eric Bischoff, Mike Tenay, and Kazuo Ishikawa.

Collision in Korea is one of the topics covered in the third season of Vice TV's Dark Side of the Ring in May 2021.

== Production ==
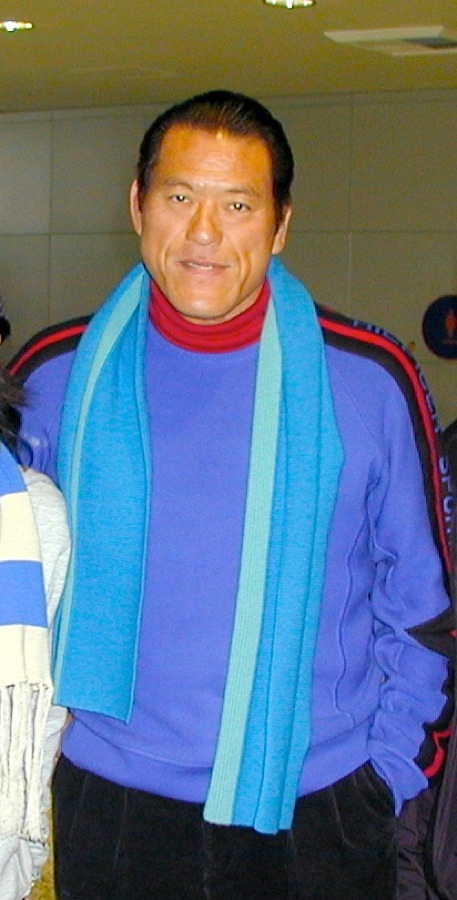
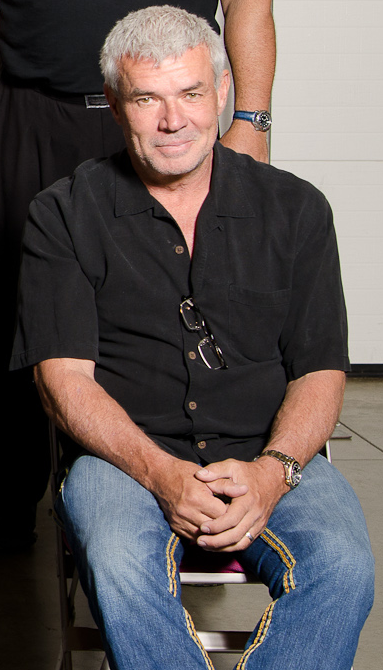
Antonio Inoki (left) and Eric Bischoff of New Japan Pro-Wrestling and World Championship Wrestling, respectively

The idea for a professional wrestling event in North Korea came from Antonio Inoki, a Japanese politician, professional wrestler, and head of the professional wrestling promotion New Japan Pro-Wrestling (NJPW). At the time, Inoki was struggling with his political career and envisioned the event as an opportunity to improve the diplomatic relations between Japan and North Korea.

As a wrestler, Inoki had trained under Rikidōzan, a Korean-Japanese wrestler whom the government of North Korea had used extensively in propaganda following his death in 1963. This enabled him to work with the General Association of Korean Residents in Japan (Chongryon) and develop a positive relationship with the North Korean government.

Additionally, Kim Jong Il had recently become Supreme Leader of North Korea following the death of his father Kim Il Sung in 1994 and was allowing some foreign tourists to attend the event, with The New York Times stating that it may have been in an attempt to showcase his leadership of the country.

While planning the event, Inoki wanted to get American wrestlers to participate, and he reached out to Eric Bischoff, president of World Championship Wrestling (WCW), an American promotion with which NJPW had a working relationship. Bischoff was enthusiastic about the event and was even able to convince retired boxer Muhammad Ali, who Inoki had competed against in 1976, to attend the event. At the time, WCW was competing in a ratings war against the World Wrestling Federation (WWF, now WWE) promotion, and Bischoff believed that a large-scale international event could bolster WCW's popularity worldwide.

As part of the working arrangement, Inoki would compete in the main event against a famous American wrestler from WCW after the proposed wrestler vs boxer main event with him taking on world heavyweight boxing champion George Foreman failed to eventuate. Bischoff initially approached WCW wrestler Hulk Hogan, but he declined to participate. In an interview with Sports Illustrated, Bischoff stated, "I might as well have asked him to row a boat to Pluto. It was not gonna [sic] happen". As a result, Bischoff asked Ric Flair, who agreed.

In addition to Flair, other WCW wrestlers who participated in the event included 2 Cold Scorpio, Chris Benoit (under his gimmick as Wild Pegasus), Road Warrior Hawk, Scott Norton, and the Steiner Brothers. Reporter Mike Chinoy also came to cover the event for CNN. WCW consultant Sonny Onoo contacted the Japanese embassy to inform them of their plans, with the embassy stating that they could not guarantee their safety, and the wrestlers traveled to North Korea from Japan on a military transport plane. Upon landing, the people had their passports confiscated and were split into two groups with handlers assigned to each. They were then given a tour of North Korea and laid flowers at the foot of a statue of Kim Il-sung.

North Korea created posters to promote the event that reused motifs from the 13th World Festival of Youth and Students, the country's answer to South Korea's 1988 Summer Olympics in Seoul. Two logos were created, including one that featured a cartoon tiger that copied Seoul Olympic mascot Hodori.

== Event ==
=== Day 1 ===
Other on-screen personnel
Role:	Name:
Commentators	Eric Bischoff
Commentators	Mike Tenay
Commentators	Kazuo Ishikawa
Ring announcer	Hidekazu Tanaka
Referees	Masao Tayama
Referees	Tiger Hattori

The opening bout was a Singles Match in which Yuji Nagata defeated Tokimitsu Ishizawa by forcing him to submit using the Nagata Lock III (a crossface/scissored armbar combination).

The second bout was a Tag Team Match in which Akira Hokuto & Bull Nakano defeated Manami Toyota & Mariko Yoshida when Nakano pinned Yoshida following a diving leg drop.

The third bout was a singles match in which Hiroshi Hase defeated Wild Pegasus by pinfall.

The fourth bout was a tag team match in which Ookami Gundan (Masahiro Chono & Hiro Saito) defeated El Samurai & Tadao Yasuda when Chono pinned El Samurai following a diving shoulder block.

The fifth bout was a singles match in which Flying Scorpio defeated Shinjiro Otani when the referee stopped the match due to Otani bleeding excessively from a broken nose.

The sixth bout was a singles match in which Kensuke Sasaki defeated Masa Saito by pinfall.

The main event was a singles match between Scott Norton and Shinya Hashimoto that ended in a time limit draw.

=== Day 2 ===
The opening bout was a singles match in which Hiro Saito defeated Yuji Nagata by pinfall.

The second bout was a singles match in which Akira Hokuto defeated Bull Nakano for the CMLL World Women's Championship. The match ended with a pinfall.

The third bout was a singles match in which Black Cat defeated El Samurai by pinfall.

The fourth bout was a singles match in which Wild Pegasus defeated Flying Scorpio by pinfall following a swandive headbutt.

The fifth bout was a tag team match in which Masahiro Chono & Scott Norton defeated Akira Nogami & Takayuki Iizuka by pinfall.

The sixth bout was a singles match in which Hawk Warrior defeated Tadao Yasuda by pinfall following a diving clothesline.

The seventh bout was a tag team match in which The Steiner Brothers defeated Hiroshi Hase & Kensuke Sasaki when Scott Steiner pinned Hase following a Steiner Screw Driver.

The main event was a singles match in which Antonio Inoki defeated Ric Flair by pinfall following an enzuigiri.

== Results ==
=== Day 1 ===
No.	Results	Stipulations	Times
1	Yuji Nagata defeated Tokimitsu Ishizawa by submission	Singles match	4:28
2	Akira Hokuto & Bull Nakano defeated Manami Toyota & Mariko Yoshida by pinfall	Tag team match	8:34
3	Hiroshi Hase defeated Wild Pegasus by pinfall	Singles match	10:10
4	Ookami Gundan (Hiro Saito & Masahiro Chono) defeated El Samurai & Tadao Yasuda by pinfall	Tag team match	8:06
5	Flying Scorpio defeated Shinjiro Otani by Referee's Decision	Singles match	2:37
6	Kensuke Sasaki defeated Masa Saito by pinfall	Singles match	8:34
7	Shinya Hashimoto (c) vs. Scott Norton ended in a time limit draw	Singles match for the IWGP Heavyweight Championship	20:00
(c) / – the champion(s) heading into the match

=== Day 2 ===
No.	Results	Stipulations	Times
1	Hiro Saito defeated Yuji Nagata by pinfall	Singles match	5:29
2	Akira Hokuto (c) defeated Bull Nakano by pinfall	Singles match for the CMLL World Women's Championship	8:04
3	Black Cat defeated El Samurai by pinfall	Singles match	4:58
4	Wild Pegasus defeated Flying Scorpio by pinfall	Singles match	6:02
5	Masahiro Chono & Scott Norton defeated Akira Nogami & Takayuki Iizuka by pinfall	Tag team match	8:40
6	Hawk Warrior defeated Tadao Yasuda by pinfall	Singles match	2:21
7	The Steiner Brothers (Scott Steiner & Rick Steiner) defeated Hiroshi Hase & Kensuke Sasaki by pinfall	Tag team match	11:51
8	Antonio Inoki defeated Ric Flair by pinfall	Singles match	14:52
(c) / – the champion(s) heading into the match

== Aftermath ==
Following the event, North Korean officials requested that Flair read a statement that the nation had the capability to dominate the United States, though Flair declined and instead made a statement wherein he expressed praise for the "beautiful and peaceful country" of North Korea and said, "His Excellency, Kim Il-sung, will always be with us". In late 1995, an image taken during the event showing a bloody Flair being beaten by Inoki was featured on propaganda leaflets that were dropped by the North Korean government over Seoul.

North Korea's Mokran Video released two NTSC VHS video cassettes that included all the 15 matches in full and featured the tiger mascot from event posters on the cover.

In the United States, the show garnered little news attention, and when the event was released as a pay-per-view later that year, it only received approximately 30,000 buys, a small amount compared to the company's other pay-per-views. Following the purchase of WCW and its assets by WWE in 2001, the company has rarely acknowledged the event and has not released the event on its WWE Network, despite having released almost all other WCW taped events. According to Bischoff and sports journalist Dave Meltzer, this may be because WWE claims the attendance of 93,173 people for their WrestleMania III in 1987 as one of the largest ever for a professional wrestling event, and acknowledging that a competitor of theirs broke that record would hurt their image.
