= Wrestling Dontaku 2013 =

- Promotional poster for the event, featuring caricatures of several NJPW wrestlers
- Promotion: New Japan Pro-Wrestling
- Date: May 3, 2013
- City: Fukuoka, Japan
- Venue: Fukuoka Kokusai Center
- Attendance: 6,800

Pay-per-view chronology
← Previous; Invasion Attack	Next → Dominion 6.22

Wrestling Dontaku chronology
← Previous; 2012	Next → 2014

Wrestling Dontaku 2013 was a professional wrestling pay-per-view (PPV) event promoted by New Japan Pro-Wrestling (NJPW). The event took place on May 3, 2013, in Fukuoka, Fukuoka, at the Fukuoka Kokusai Center. The event featured ten matches (including one dark match), four of which were contested for championships.

It was the tenth event under the Wrestling Dontaku name, and was notable for featuring the formation of Bullet Club.

== Storylines ==
Wrestling Dontaku 2013 featured ten professional wrestling matches that involved different wrestlers from pre-existing scripted feuds and storylines. Wrestlers portrayed villains, heroes, or less distinguishable characters in the scripted events that built tension and culminated in a wrestling match or series of matches.

== Event ==
Two titles changed hands during the event, first the Forever Hooligans (Alex Koslov and Rocky Romero) defeated Time Splitters (Alex Shelley and Kushida) for the IWGP Junior Heavyweight Tag Team Championship and then Tencozy (Hiroyoshi Tenzan and Satoshi Kojima) defeated K.E.S. (Davey Boy Smith Jr. and Lance Archer) for the IWGP Tag Team Championship in a four-way match. The event featured two matches in the storyline rivalry between the Complete Players and G.B.H. In the first Complete Player Masato Tanaka successfully defended the NEVER Openweight Championship against freelancer Tomoaki Honma, while in the second G.B.H. leader Togi Makabe defeated Yujiro Takahashi to end their three-month-long rivalry. Other successful title defenses saw IWGP Intercontinental Champion Shinsuke Nakamura defeat Shelton X Benjamin and IWGP Heavyweight Champion Kazuchika Okada defeat Minoru Suzuki. Post-match, Okada was challenged by Makabe, setting up the main event for Dominion 6.22. The event also saw a surprise appearance from Tetsuya Naito, who announced he was going to be returning from his knee surgery and wrestling his first match on June 22 at Dominion 6.22. In a major storyline development, Karl Anderson turned on Hiroshi Tanahashi after their match against each other and came together with Prince Devitt, Bad Luck Fale and Tama Tonga to form Bullet Club.

== Results ==
No.	Results	Stipulations	Times
1^{D}	Jyushin Thunder Liger, Máximo, Tiger Mask and Yuji Nagata defeated Chaos (Gedo, Jado, Tomohiro Ishii and Yoshi-Hashi)	Eight-man tag team match	07:04
2	Forever Hooligans (Alex Koslov and Rocky Romero) defeated Time Splitters (Alex Shelley and Kushida) (c)	Tag team match for the IWGP Junior Heavyweight Tag Team Championship	11:05
3	Bad Luck Fale and Prince Devitt defeated Captain New Japan and Ryusuke Taguchi	Tag team match	05:28
4	Tencozy (Hiroyoshi Tenzan and Satoshi Kojima) defeated K.E.S. (Davey Boy Smith Jr. and Lance Archer) (c), Chaos (Takashi Iizuka and Toru Yano) and Muscle Orchestra (Manabu Nakanishi and Strong Man)	Four-way tag team match for the IWGP Tag Team Championship	10:40
5	Masato Tanaka (c) defeated Tomoaki Honma	Singles match for the NEVER Openweight Championship	09:32
6	Togi Makabe defeated Yujiro Takahashi	Singles match	09:59
7	Hirooki Goto vs. Katsuyori Shibata ended in a draw	Singles match	11:39
8	Hiroshi Tanahashi defeated Karl Anderson (with Tama Tonga)	Singles match	12:52
9	Shinsuke Nakamura (c) defeated Shelton X Benjamin	Singles match for the IWGP Intercontinental Championship	14:59
10	Kazuchika Okada (c) (with Gedo) defeated Minoru Suzuki	Singles match for the IWGP Heavyweight Championship	30:49
(c) / – the champion(s) heading into the match; D / – this was a dark match
