= Wrestle Kingdom IV =

2010 New Japan Pro-Wrestling pay-per-view event

- Promotional poster for the event, featuring various NJPW wrestlers
- Promotion: New Japan Pro-Wrestling
- Date: January 4, 2010
- City: Tokyo, Japan
- Venue: Tokyo Dome
- Attendance: 41,500 (official); 20,000 (claimed)

Pay-per-view chronology
← Previous; Destruction	Next → Circuit: New Japan Ism

Wrestle Kingdom chronology
← Previous; III	Next → V

New Japan Pro-Wrestling events chronology
← Previous; Destruction '09	Next → Wrestling Dontaku 2010

Wrestle Kingdom IV in Tokyo Dome (レッスルキングダムIV in 東京ドーム, Ressuru Kingudamu IV in Tōkyō Dōmu) was a professional wrestling pay-per-view (PPV) event produced by the New Japan Pro-Wrestling (NJPW) promotion, which took place at the Tokyo Dome in Tokyo, Japan on January 4, 2010. It was the 19th January 4 Tokyo Dome Show and the fourth held under the "Wrestle Kingdom" name. The event featured ten matches, five of which were contested for championships.

Through NJPW's international working relationships, the event featured wrestlers from the American Total Nonstop Action Wrestling (TNA) and Mexican Consejo Mundial de Lucha Libre (CMLL) promotions for the third and second year in a row, respectively. In addition, wrestlers from Japanese promotions Pro Wrestling Noah and Pro Wrestling Zero1 also took part in the show.

== Storylines ==
Wrestle Kingdom IV featured ten professional wrestling matches that involved different wrestlers from pre-existing scripted feuds and storylines. Wrestlers portrayed villains, heroes, or less distinguishable characters in the scripted events that built tension and culminated in a wrestling match or series of matches.

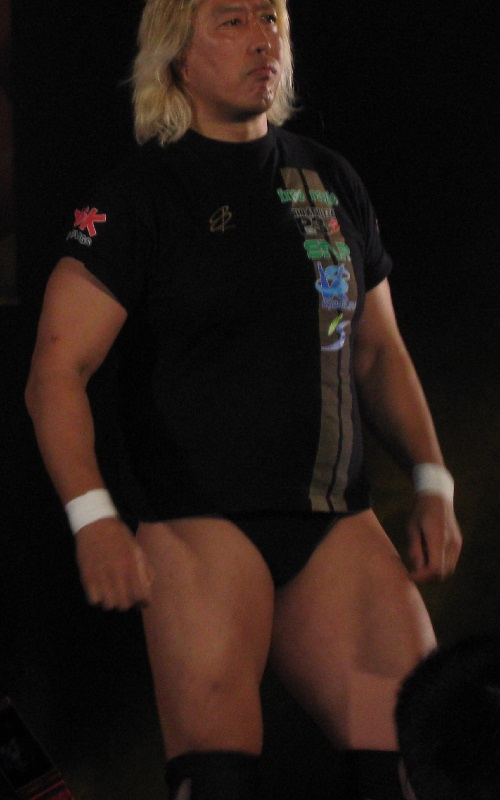
Freelancer Yoshihiro Takayama, who challenged for the IWGP Heavyweight Championship in the main event of the show

Wrestle Kingdom IV was main evented by Shinsuke Nakamura defending the IWGP Heavyweight Championship against Yoshihiro Takayama. This was the first match between the two in six years and was billed as a rematch from the 2004 January 4 Tokyo Dome show. That match saw Nakamura defeat Takayama for the NWF World Heavyweight Championship, which was afterwards retired, leading to Takayama announcing that if he were to win the IWGP Heavyweight Championship at Wrestle Kingdom IV, he would immediately retire the title.

The show would also feature the return of No Limit, the tag of Tetsuya Naito and Yujiro, following their ten-month overseas learning excursion, spent in the Mexican Consejo Mundial de Lucha Libre (CMLL) and American Total Nonstop Action Wrestling (TNA) promotions. No Limit had previously wrestled in NJPW's junior heavyweight tag team division, but would now work as heavyweights after making the transition in Mexico. Their return match would see them challenge for the IWGP Tag Team Championship in a three-way hardcore match involving defending champions and TNA representatives Team 3D (Brother Devon and Brother Ray) as well as Bad Intentions (Giant Bernard and Karl Anderson).

== Event ==
The show was headlined by Shinsuke Nakamura making his fourth successful defense of the IWGP Heavyweight Championship against Yoshihiro Takayama. The event also featured several matches pitting NJPW wrestlers against wrestlers from the Pro Wrestling Noah promotion. These included Noah's Takashi Sugiura making his first successful defense of his promotion's top title, the GHC Heavyweight Championship, against NJPW's Hirooki Goto, NJPW's Hiroshi Tanahashi defeating Noah's Go Shiozaki, NJPW's Togi Makabe defeating Noah's Muhammad Yone, and Noah's Naomichi Marufuji capturing the IWGP Junior Heavyweight Championship from NJPW's Tiger Mask.

The fifth match of the show featured veteran wrestlers Abdullah the Butcher and Terry Funk as part of an eight-man tag team match. Funk's quartet won the match after Abdullah turned on his team, made up wrestlers from the Chaos stable.

The event also included title matches for both of NJPW's tag team championships. First, Apollo 55 (Prince Devitt and Ryusuke Taguchi) made their fourth successful defense of the IWGP Junior Heavyweight Tag Team Championship against the CMLL team of Averno and Último Guerrero. In the second title match, No Limit defeated reigning champions Team 3D as well as Bad Intentions in a hardcore match to become the new IWGP Tag Team Champions.

== Results ==
No.	Results	Stipulations	Times
1	Seigigun (Mitsuhide Hirasawa, Super Strong Machine and Wataru Inoue) defeated Jyushin Thunder Liger, Kazuchika Okada and Koji Kanemoto	Six-man tag team match	04:59
2	Apollo 55 (Prince Devitt and Ryusuke Taguchi) (c) defeated Averno and Último Guerrero	Tag team match for the IWGP Junior Heavyweight Tag Team Championship	09:07
3	No Limit (Tetsuya Naito and Yujiro) defeated Team 3D (Brother Devon and Brother Ray) (c) and Bad Intentions (Giant Bernard and Karl Anderson)	Three-way hardcore match for the IWGP Tag Team Championship	13:28
4	Masato Tanaka and Tajiri defeated Seigigun (Akebono and Yuji Nagata)	Tag team match	09:37
5	Manabu Nakanishi, Masahiro Chono, Riki Choshu and Terry Funk defeated Abdullah the Butcher and Chaos (Takashi Iizuka, Tomohiro Ishii and Toru Yano)	Eight-man tag team match	08:52
6	Togi Makabe defeated Muhammad Yone	Singles match	05:39
7	Naomichi Marufuji defeated Tiger Mask (c)	Singles match for the IWGP Junior Heavyweight Championship	14:14
8	Hiroshi Tanahashi defeated Go Shiozaki	Singles match	19:04
9	Takashi Sugiura (c) defeated Hirooki Goto	Singles match for the GHC Heavyweight Championship	20:54
10	Shinsuke Nakamura (c) defeated Yoshihiro Takayama	Singles match for the IWGP Heavyweight Championship	15:51
(c) / – the champion(s) heading into the match
