= Wrestling Dontaku =

New Japan Pro-Wrestling event series

- Promotions: New Japan Pro-Wrestling
- First event: Wrestling Dontaku 1993

Wrestling Dontaku (レスリングどんたく, Resuringu Dontaku) is an annual professional wrestling event promoted by New Japan Pro-Wrestling (NJPW). It takes place at the end of Japan's Golden Week, in the city of Fukuoka alongside the Hakata Dontaku festival in early May.

== History ==
Wrestling Dontaku was originally held from 1993 to 1995, and again from 2000 to 2001, in Fukuoka at the Fukuoka Dome. The event was revived in 2009 in the smaller Fukuoka Kokusai Center, and aired as a pay-per-view (PPV). From 2013 to 2014, the event also aired outside Japan as an internet pay-per-view (iPPV). Since 2015, the event has aired worldwide on NJPW's internet streaming site, NJPW World. In 2018 and 2019, Wrestling Dontaku took place over two back-to-back shows. The event was originally scheduled to take place in 2020 on May 3 and May 4, but was cancelled due to the COVID-19 pandemic. In 2022, the event took place on May 1 at Fukuoka PayPay Dome, formerly known as the Fukuoka Dome. This was the first time that Wrestling Dontaku was held in the domed venue since 2001.

== Events ==
#	Event	Date	City	Venue	Attendance	Main event	Ref(s)
1	Wrestling Dontaku 1993	May 3, 1993	Fukuoka, Japan	Fukuoka Dome	55,000	Antonio Inoki and Tatsumi Fujinami vs. Genichiro Tenryu and Riki Choshu	
2	Wrestling Dontaku 1994	May 1, 1994	Fukuoka, Japan	Fukuoka Dome	53,500	Antonio Inoki vs. The Great Muta	
3	Wrestling Dontaku 1995	May 3, 1995	Fukuoka, Japan	Fukuoka Dome	52,000	Shinya Hashimoto (c) vs. Keiji Mutoh for the IWGP Heavyweight Championship	
4	Wrestling Dontaku 2000	May 5, 2000	Fukuoka, Japan	Fukuoka Dome	25,000	Power Warrior (c) vs. The Great Muta for the IWGP Heavyweight Championship	
5	Wrestling Dontaku 2001	May 5, 2001	Fukuoka, Japan	Fukuoka Dome	25,000	Kazunari Murakami and Naoya Ogawa vs. Manabu Nakanishi and Riki Choshu	
6	Wrestling Dontaku 2009	May 3, 2009	Fukuoka, Japan	Fukuoka Kokusai Center	5,500	Hiroshi Tanahashi (c) vs. Hirooki Goto for the IWGP Heavyweight Championship	
7	Wrestling Dontaku 2010	May 3, 2010	Fukuoka, Japan	Fukuoka Kokusai Center	6,000	Shinsuke Nakamura (c) vs. Togi Makabe for the IWGP Heavyweight Championship	
8	Wrestling Dontaku 2011	May 3, 2011	Fukuoka, Japan	Fukuoka Kokusai Center	6,500	Hiroshi Tanahashi (c) vs. Shinsuke Nakamura for the IWGP Heavyweight Championship	
9	Wrestling Dontaku 2012	May 3, 2012	Fukuoka, Japan	Fukuoka Kokusai Center	6,500	Kazuchika Okada (c) vs. Hirooki Goto for the IWGP Heavyweight Championship	
10	Wrestling Dontaku 2013	May 3, 2013	Fukuoka, Japan	Fukuoka Kokusai Center	6,800	Kazuchika Okada (c) vs. Minoru Suzuki for the IWGP Heavyweight Championship	
11	Wrestling Dontaku 2014	May 3, 2014	Fukuoka, Japan	Fukuoka Kokusai Center	7,190	Kazuchika Okada (c) vs. A.J. Styles for the IWGP Heavyweight Championship	
12	Wrestling Dontaku 2015	May 3, 2015	Fukuoka, Japan	Fukuoka Kokusai Center	5,180	Shinsuke Nakamura (c) vs. Hirooki Goto for the IWGP Intercontinental Championship	
13	Wrestling Dontaku 2016	May 3, 2016	Fukuoka, Japan	Fukuoka Kokusai Center	5,299	Tetsuya Naito (c) vs. Tomohiro Ishii for the IWGP Heavyweight Championship	
14	Wrestling Dontaku 2017	May 3, 2017	Fukuoka, Japan	Fukuoka Kokusai Center	6,126	Kazuchika Okada (c) vs. Bad Luck Fale for the IWGP Heavyweight Championship	
15	Wrestling Dontaku 2018	May 3, 2018	Fukuoka, Japan	Fukuoka Kokusai Center	4,066	Kenny Omega vs. Hangman Page	
15	Wrestling Dontaku 2018	May 4, 2018	Fukuoka, Japan	Fukuoka Kokusai Center	6,307	Kazuchika Okada (c) vs. Hiroshi Tanahashi for the IWGP Heavyweight Championship	
16	Wrestling Dontaku 2019	May 3, 2019	Fukuoka, Japan	Fukuoka Kokusai Center	4,011	Dragon Lee (c) vs. Taiji Ishimori for the IWGP Junior Heavyweight Championship	
16	Wrestling Dontaku 2019	May 4, 2019	Fukuoka, Japan	Fukuoka Kokusai Center	6,105	Kazuchika Okada (c) vs. Sanada for the IWGP Heavyweight Championship	
17	Wrestling Dontaku 2021	May 3, 2021	Fukuoka, Japan	Fukuoka Kokusai Center	2,211	Hiroshi Tanahashi (c) vs. Jay White for the NEVER Openweight Championship	
17	Wrestling Dontaku 2021	May 4, 2021	Fukuoka, Japan	Fukuoka Kokusai Center	2,367	Will Ospreay (c) vs. Shingo Takagi for the IWGP World Heavyweight Championship	
18	Wrestling Dontaku 2022	May 1, 2022	Fukuoka, Japan	Fukuoka PayPay Dome	8,162	Kazuchika Okada (c) vs. Tetsuya Naito for the IWGP World Heavyweight Championship	
19	Wrestling Dontaku 2023	May 3, 2023	Fukuoka, Japan	Fukuoka Kokusai Center	4,489	Sanada (c) vs. Hiromu Takahashi for the IWGP World Heavyweight Championship	
20	Wrestling Dontaku 2024	May 3, 2024	Fukuoka, Japan	Fukuoka Kokusai Center	2,440	Nic Nemeth (c) vs. Hiroshi Tanahashi for the IWGP Global Heavyweight Championship	
21	Wrestling Dontaku 2024	May 4, 2024	Fukuoka, Japan	Fukuoka Kokusai Center	4,238	Jon Moxley (c) vs. Ren Narita for the IWGP World Heavyweight Championship	
22	Wrestling Dontaku 2025	May 3, 2025	Fukuoka, Japan	Fukuoka Kokusai Center	2,903	House of Torture (Evil, Ren Narita, Sanada, Sho and Yoshinobu Kanemaru) vs. Bullet Club War Dogs (David Finlay, Clark Connors, Drilla Moloney, Gabe Kidd and Taiji Ishimori) in a Dog Pound match	
23	Wrestling Dontaku 2025	May 4, 2025	Fukuoka, Japan	Fukuoka Kokusai Center	5,407	Hirooki Goto (c) vs. Callum Newman for the IWGP World Heavyweight Championship	
24	Wrestling Dontaku 2026	May 3, 2026	Fukuoka, Japan	Fukuoka Kokusai Center	TBA	Yota Tsuji (c) vs. Andrade El Idolo for the IWGP Global Heavyweight Championship	
25	Wrestling Dontaku 2026	May 4, 2026	Fukuoka, Japan	Fukuoka Kokusai Center	TBA	Callum Newman (c) vs. Shingo Takagi for the IWGP Heavyweight Championship	
(c) – refers to the champion(s) heading into the match

== 2000 ==
Wrestling Dontaku 2000
- Promotion: New Japan Pro-Wrestling
- Date: May 5, 2000
- City: Fukuoka, Japan
- Venue: Fukuoka Dome
- Attendance: 25,000

Wrestling Dontaku chronology
← Previous; 1995	Next → 2001

New Japan Pro-Wrestling events chronology
← Previous; Wrestling World 2000	Next → Do Judge!!

The fourth Wrestling Dontaku, first in five years, was held on May 5, 2000, in Fukuoka, Fukuoka, at the Fukuoka Dome.

The event featured eight matches, two of which were contested for championships. The event opened with the finals of the 2000 Young Lion Cup, where Kenzo Suzuki defeated Shinya Makabe, who later became better known as Togi Makabe, winning the IWGP Heavyweight Championship. In the semi-main event, Manabu Nakanishi and Yuji Nagata successfully defended the IWGP Tag Team Championship against Kazunari Murakami and Naoya Ogawa, while in the main event, Kensuke Sasaki, using his Power Warrior persona, defeated The Great Muta to retain the IWGP Heavyweight Championship.

No.	Results	Stipulations	Times
1	Kenzo Suzuki defeated Shinya Makabe	Singles match in the finals of the 2000 Young Lion Cup	15:08
2	Junji Hirata, Shiro Koshinaka and Tadao Yasuda defeated Team 2000 (Hiro Saito, Michiyoshi Ohara and Tatsutoshi Goto	Six-man tag team match	10:19
3	Kendo Kashin, Koji Kanemoto, Shinjiro Otani and Tatsuhito Takaiwa defeated Cima, Jyushin Thunder Liger, Minoru Tanaka and Sumo Dandy Fuji	Eight-man tag team match	14:26
4	Genichiro Tenryu defeated Takashi Iizuka	Singles match	13:26
5	Yutaka Yoshie defeated Satoshi Kojima	Singles match	16:08
6	Masahiro Chono defeated Tatsumi Fujinami	Singles match	06:03
7	Manabu Nakanishi and Yuji Nagata (c) defeated Kazunari Murakami and Naoya Ogawa	Tag team match for the IWGP Tag Team Championship	09:26
8	Power Warrior (c) defeated The Great Muta	Singles match for the IWGP Heavyweight Championship	12:44
(c) / – the champion(s) heading into the match

== 2001 ==
Wrestling Dontaku 2001
- Promotion: New Japan Pro-Wrestling
- Date: May 5, 2001
- City: Fukuoka, Japan
- Venue: Fukuoka Dome
- Attendance: 25,000

Wrestling Dontaku chronology
← Previous; 2000	Next → 2009

New Japan Pro-Wrestling events chronology
← Previous; Wrestling World 2001	Next → Wrestling World 2002

The fifth Wrestling Dontaku was held on May 5, 2001, in Fukuoka, Fukuoka, at the Fukuoka Dome. The event featured nine matches, one of which was contested for a championship.

In the title match, El Samurai and Jyushin Thunder Liger defeated the Mexican brother tag team of Dr. Wagner, Jr. and Silver King to retain the IWGP Junior Heavyweight Tag Team Championship. The event also featured appearances by mixed martial artists Don Frye and Rainy Martinez.

No.	Results	Stipulations	Times
1	Katsuyori Shibata and Shinya Makabe defeated Hiroshi Tanahashi and Wataru Inoue	Tag team match	11:01
2	Osamu Nishimura, Shiro Koshinaka and Yutaka Yoshie defeated Team 2000 (Hiro Saito, Michiyoshi Ohara and Tatsutoshi Goto)	Six-man tag team match	11:00
3	Minoru Tanaka defeated Kendo Kashin	Singles match	10:18
4	El Samurai and Jyushin Thunder Liger (c) defeated Dr. Wagner, Jr. and Silver King	Tag team match for the IWGP Junior Heavyweight Tag Team Championship	19:09
5	Don Frye defeated Scott Norton	Singles match	07:15
6	Tadao Yasuda defeated Takashi Iizuka	Singles match	07:23
7	Yuji Nagata defeated Rainy Martinez	Singles match	02:29
8	BATT (Hiroshi Hase, Keiji Mutoh and Taiyō Kea) defeated Team 2000 (Hiroyoshi Tenzan, Masahiro Chono and Satoshi Kojima)	Six-man tag team match	27:00
9	Manabu Nakanishi and Riki Choshu defeated Kazunari Murakami and Naoya Ogawa	Tag team match	09:07
(c) / – the champion(s) heading into the match

== See also ==
- List of New Japan Pro-Wrestling pay-per-view events
