= Seigigun =

Professional wrestling stable

Stable
- Members: Yuji Nagata (leader); Akebono (honorary); Captain New Japan/Mitsuhide Hirasawa; King Fale; Super Strong Machine; Wataru Inoue
- Name(s): Seigigun
- Debut: September 2009
- Disbanded: April 2013

Seigigun (青義軍, Seigigun, literally translated to "Blue Justice Army") was a professional wrestling stable in New Japan Pro-Wrestling, led by Yuji Nagata.

== History ==
=== 2009 ===
Seigigun was first formed in September 2009 as a branch of New Japan Seikigun ("regular army") that seeks justice. Upon the formation of the group, Nagata and Inoue also began forming a "teacher/student" like team, teaming up at the 2009 G1 Tag League and finished in 4th place with 4 points. On December 5, 2009, Nagata challenged Shinsuke Nakamura for the IWGP Heavyweight Championship but lost.

=== 2010 ===
At Wrestle Kingdom IV In Tokyo Dome, Inoue, Machine, and Hirasawa defeated Jyushin Thunder Liger, Koji Kanemoto, and Kazuchika Okada in the opening match while Nagata teaming with Akebono lost to Tajiri and Masato Tanaka. In March, Nagata and Inoue entered the New Japan Cup tournament. Nagata lost in the first round to Yujiro Takahashi while Inoue defeated Giant Bernard in the first round but lost to Masato Tanaka in the second round. Following the New Japan Cup, Hirasawa continued in the midcard largely serving as the fall guy in tag match, Machine also remained in the midcard, & Nagata and Inoue formed a team and began a feud with No Limit and Bad Intentions over the IWGP Tag Team Championship. At Wrestling Dontaku 2010 on May 3, 2010, Seigigun defeated Bad Intentions and No Limit in a 3 way to win the IWGP Tag Team Championship. One month later at Dominion 6.19 on June 19, Seigigun lost the title to Bad Intentions in another 3 way (also involving No Limit). On June 28, Seigigun entered a six man tag tournament with Nagata, Inoue, and Hirasawa forming one team while Machine teamed with Tonga Strong Machine and Pink Strong Machine however both teams lost. On July 19, Nagata and Inoue once again took part in a 3 way for the IWGP Tag Team Titles but came up short. In August, Nagata and Inoue both entered the 2010 G1 Climax with both in the same block. Neither won with Nagata coming in 5th place with 8 points while Inoue finished in last place with 2 points. In September 2010, Hirasawa left New Japan and Seigigun to go on a learning excursion to Puerto Rico, young lion: King Fale was recruited in Hirasawa's place. On September 26, Nagata and Inoue challenged Bad Intentions for the IWGP Tag Team Championship but lost. In October, Seigigun entered the 2010 G1 Climax Tag League with Nagata and Inoue forming one team while Machine and Fale formed another. Machine and Fale would finish in last place of their block with 0 points, Nagata and Inoue would ultimately go on to win the tournament defeating Bad Intentions in the semi-finals and No Limit in the finals. With the G1 Climax Tag League victory, Nagata and Inoue challenged Bad Intentions once again for the IWGP Tag Team Titles on December 11 but would once again lose.

=== 2011 ===
Following the tag title loss, Nagata began a short feud with Minoru Suzuki which culminated in a match at Wrestle Kingdom V in Tokyo Dome, which Nagata won. At The New Beginning on February 20, Nagata, Inoue, and Fale teamed with Hiroyoshi Tenzan against Chaos (Shinsuke Nakamura, Toru Yano, Takashi Iizuka, and Yujiro Takahashi) in an elimination match which they came up short. In March, Nagata and Inoue entered the 2011 New Japan Cup with Inoue falling to Yano in the first round while Nagata fared better as he won the tournament, defeating Nakamura in the finals. On June 18, Hirasawa returned from Puerto Rico, now performing under the ring name Hideo Saito, and turned on Nagata and the Seigigun, joining rival group Chaos.

=== 2013 ===
After a long hiatus, Nagata reunited the Seigigun on March 3, 2013, at New Japan's 41st anniversary event, where he, Super Strong Machine (making his first wrestling appearance in nineteen months), Wataru Inoue and Captain New Japan, the masked persona of former member Mitsuhide Hirasawa, were defeated in an eight-man tag team match by Hirooki Goto, Karl Anderson, Ryusuke Taguchi and Tama Tonga. On April 7 at Invasion Attack, King Fale returned to New Japan, turning on the Seigigun, including unmasking Captain New Japan, and aligning himself with Prince Devitt. With Fale turning on the stable and Inoue being absent due to injuries, Nagata announced he was disbanding Seigigun.

=== 2014-present ===
On April 2, 2014, Seigigun reunited for one night to take part in Wataru Inoue's retirement event, where Nagata, Captain New Japan and Super Strong Machine defeated Suzuki-gun (Minoru Suzuki, Taichi and Taka Michinoku).

Even though the group is disbanded, Yuji Nagata still represents them while wrestling for the Main Unit. He is still considered the leader of Seigi-gun and continues to wear the signature blue on his gear.

== Championships and accomplishments ==
- All Japan Pro Wrestling
  - Champion Carnival (2011) – Nagata
- New Japan Pro-Wrestling
  - IWGP Tag Team Championship (1 time) – Nagata and Inoue
  - G1 Climax Tag League (2010) – Nagata and Inoue
  - New Japan Cup (2011) – Nagata
- Pro Wrestling Noah
  - GHC Heavyweight Championship (1 time) – Nagata
  - Global League (2013) – Nagata
