= Norio Honaga =

Japanese professional wrestler and referee

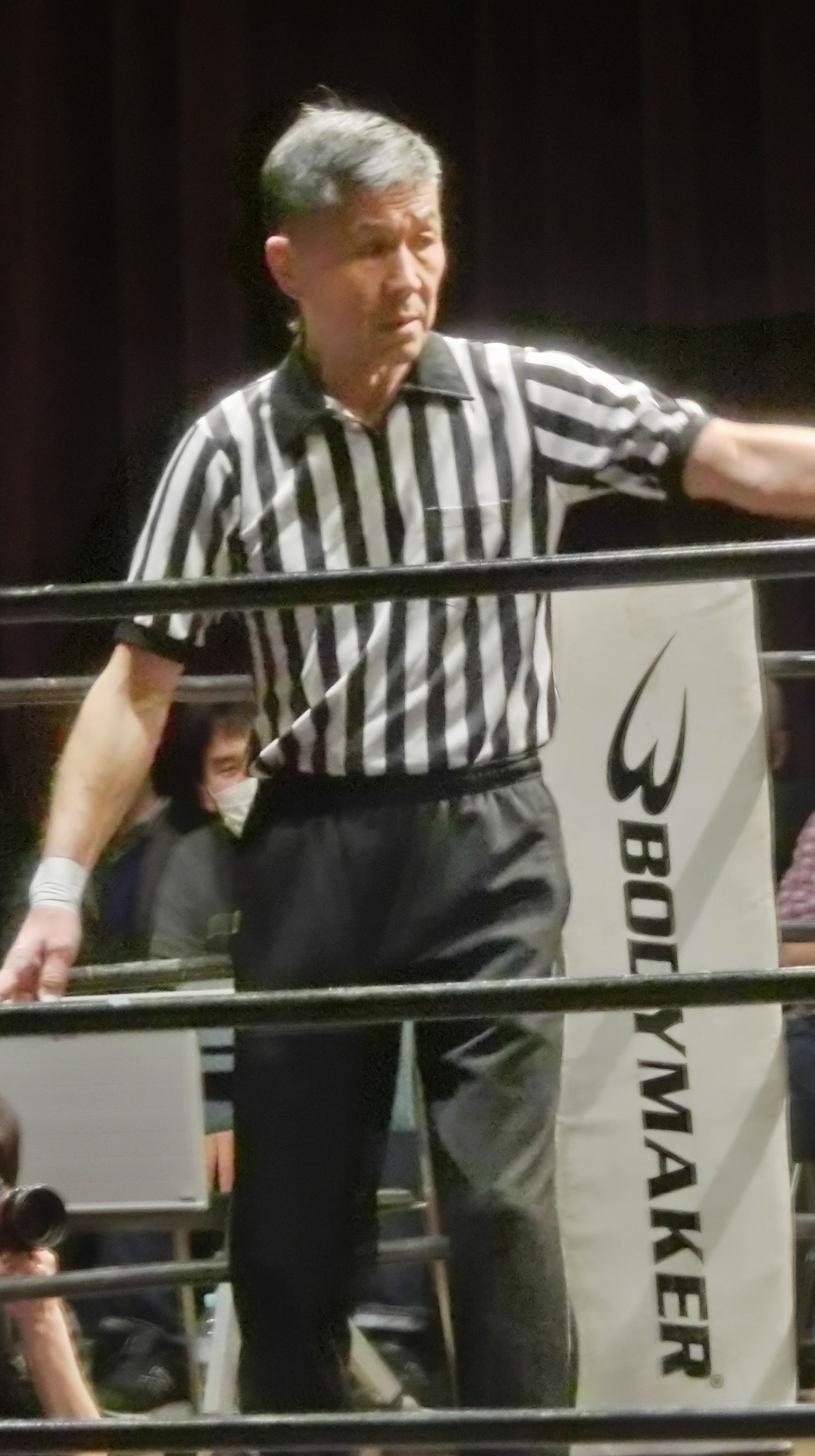
- Honaga in 2019

Personal information
- Born: August 11, 1955 (age 70) Tokyo, Japan

Professional wrestling career
- Ring name: Norio Honaga
- Billed height: 1.82 m (6 ft 0 in)
- Billed weight: 92 kg (203 lb)
- Debut: April 25, 1980
- Retired: April 30, 1998

Norio Honaga (保永 昇男, Honaga Norio) (born August 11, 1955) is a Japanese retired professional wrestler and referee.

== Career ==
=== New Japan Pro-Wrestling (1980–1984) ===
Norio Honaga debuted for New Japan Pro-Wrestling on April 25, 1980, against Hiro Saito. In November 1982, after over two years on the undercard, Honaga was sent to on an excursion to Mexico, wrestling for Universal Wrestling Association. He returned to NJPW in March 1984, but political turmoil within the promotion forced Honaga to leave the promotion six months later.

=== All Japan Pro Wrestling (1984–1987) ===
After leaving NJPW, Honaga joined Riki Choshu's Japan Pro-Wrestling group, which joined forces with All Japan Pro Wrestling. In July 1985, Honaga won his only title in AJPW, the All Asia Tag Team Championship, with Isamu Teranishi, as Animal Hamaguchi gave his half to Honaga due to injury. He and Teranishi would hold on to the belts for over three months, before losing them to Takashi Ishikawa and Mighty Inoue in October 1985. Honaga remained with AJPW until March 1987.

=== New Japan Pro-Wrestling (1987–1998) ===
Honaga returned to NJPW in May 1987. Upon his return, he formed a tag team with Hiro Saito. In August 1987, Honaga took part in a tournament for the vacant IWGP Junior Heavyweight Championship, as Shiro Koshinaka vacated the title earlier that month due to injury; he lost to Tatsutoshi Goto in the first round. In January 1988, Honaga took part in the first-ever Top of the Super Juniors tournament, but he would place last with no points. In April 1989, Honaga took part in the Young Lion Cup tournament, despite being 33 years old with nine years of experience; he defeated Hirokazu Hata in the first round, but lost to eventual winner Naoki Sano in the semifinals. By the summer of 1989, Honaga and Saito formed the Blond Outlaws with Goto, and Super Strong Machine joined the group in 1990.

In April 1991, Honaga took part in the second TOSJ tournament, the first in three years, and this time, the IWGP Junior Heavyweight title was on the line, as Jyushin Thunder Liger vacated the title for the tournament, and Honaga defeated Liger in the finals to win the title. He would hold on to the title for nearly a month and a half before losing the title to Liger in June 1991. In November 1991, Honaga regained the title, defeating Akira Nogami. He would hold onto the title for exactly three months, before losing the title back to Liger in a match, where Liger's WCW World Light Heavyweight Championship was also on the line. In April 1992, Honaga took part in the TOSJ tournament, in which he made he tied for second place with Jyushin Thunder Liger, forcing a match between the two to determine who wrestles El Samurai later that night; Honaga lost to Liger.

By the spring of 1992, Blond Outlaws had evolved into Raging Staff. In November 1992, Honaga and the rest of Raging Staff sided with Genichiro Tenryu's WAR promotion in their rivalry with Heisei Ishingun. In May 1993, Honaga took part in another TOSJ tournament, in which he placed third place in a tie with Fit Finlay. In September 1994, Honaga took part in another tournament for the IWGP Junior Heavyweight title, as Jyushin Thunder Liger vacated the title due to injury. He defeated Gran Hamada, Shinjiro Otani and Wild Pegasus to win the title for the third time. A month later, he took part in another tournament, the Super Grade Junior Heavyweight Tag League, with Gran Hamada as his partner; they would make it to the semifinals, before losing to Black Tiger II and The Great Sasuke. In November 1994, Honaga added another title by defeating El Hijo del Santo to win the UWA World Welterweight Championship, making him a double champion. He would lose the UWA World Welterweight title to Otani in December 1994, after nearly a month as champion, and lose the IWGP Junior Heavyweight title to Koji Kanemoto in February 1995, after nearly five months as champion.

In June 1995, Honaga took part in another TOSJ tournament, which had since changed its name to the Best of the Super Juniors tournament; however, during the tournament, he suffered a rib injury after facing Dean Malenko, so he placed last with four points after forfeiting his remaining matches. A year later, he took part in another BOSJ tournament; he placed last at four points on Block B. Days later, he teamed with El Samurai to win the WAR International Junior Heavyweight Tag Team Championship from Lance Storm and Yuji Yasuraoka, but failed. In November 1996, he teamed with Junji Hirata for a one-night tag team tournament; they lost to Takashi Iizuka and Yuji Nagata in the first round. After eighteen years in the ring, Honaga decided to retire from the ring in April 1998. His first retirement match was a loss to Jyushin Thunder Liger; later that night, he and Liger teamed with El Samurai for his second retirement match and defeated Koji Kanemoto, Shinjiro Otani, and Tatsuhito Takaiwa.

== Retirement ==
Upon retiring from the ring in 1998, he became a referee. He stayed with NJPW until joining Riki Choshu's short-lived Fighting of World Japan Pro Wrestling.

== Car wreck ==
In 2007, Honaga was in a serious car wreck. He pulled out of a driveway when he was hit in the driver's door by another car. He spent 8 days and 16 hours in a coma at the Japanese Hospital (Rota). Since then, Honaga is a born-again Christian and has left the Japanese Wrestling world due to both his physical state, he lost the use of his left leg, and his love for Jesus Christ. It is rumoured in Japan that he intends to found either a church or a Christian hospital, to express his feelings as a Christian to the world.

Having lost the use of his left leg and 80% of his vision in the right eye, Honaga gave up on trap shooting, a hobby he vigorously enjoyed while he trained with Great Kojika from 1984 till 1986.

== Championships and accomplishments ==
- All Japan Pro Wrestling
  - All Asia Tag Team Championship (1 time) - with Isamu Teranishi
- New Japan Pro-Wrestling
  - IWGP Junior Heavyweight Championship (3 times)
  - Top of the Super Juniors (1991)
  - IWGP Junior Heavyweight Title Tournament (1994)
- Universal Wrestling Association
  - UWA World Welterweight Championship (1 time)

=== Luchas de Apuestas record ===
Winner (wager)	Loser (wager)	Location	Event	Date	Notes
Norio Honaga and Masa Saito (hair)	Dragón Negro and Braulio Flores (hair)	Pachuca, Hidalgo, Mexico	Live event	March 27, 1983	
